= 1999–2000 Sacramento Kings season =

NBA professional basketball team season

- Head coach: Rick Adelman
- President: Geoff Petrie
- General manager: Geoff Petrie
- Owners: Maloof family
- Arena: ARCO Arena

Results
- Record: 44–38 (.537)
- Place: Division: 5th (Pacific); Conference: 8th (Western)
- Playoff finish: First round (lost to Lakers 2–3)
- Stats at Basketball Reference

Local media
- Television: KMAX-TV; Fox Sports Net Bay Area
- Radio: KHTK

The 1999–2000 Sacramento Kings season was the 51st season for the Sacramento Kings in the National Basketball Association, and their 15th season in Sacramento, California.

== Season summary ==
=== Off-season ===
During the off-season, the team acquired Nick Anderson from the Orlando Magic, and signed free agents Tony Delk, Darrick Martin, and re-signed Tyrone Corbin; Corbin previously played for the Kings during the first half of the 1995–96 season.

=== Regular season ===
Early into the regular season, the Kings traveled overseas to Tokyo, Japan to play their first two games against the Minnesota Timberwolves at the Tokyo Dome. In the first game on November 5, 1999, the Kings were the home team and defeated the Timberwolves by a score of 100–95, in front of 32,623 fans in attendance. Three players posted double-doubles; Anderson finished with 17 points and 10 rebounds, and made 5 out of 7 three-point field-goal attempts, while Chris Webber contributed 15 points and 15 rebounds, and Vlade Divac added 13 points and 10 rebounds. In the second game on November 6, the Kings were the road team and lost to the Timberwolves by a score of 114–101, in front of 34,013 fans in attendance. Webber posted a double-double of 22 points and 10 rebounds, while Divac finished with 19 points and 7 rebounds, and second-year star Jason Williams contributed 17 points and 8 assists.

With the addition of Anderson, the Kings got off to a fast start by winning nine of their first ten games of the regular season, which included an eight-game winning streak in November. The team posted a seven-game winning streak in January, and later on held a 30–18 record at the All-Star break. However, the Kings played below .500 in winning percentage for the remainder of the season, losing seven of their final eight games, finishing in fifth place in the Pacific Division with a 44–38 record, and earning the eighth seed in the Western Conference.

Webber averaged 24.5 points, 10.5 rebounds, 4.6 assists, 1.6 steals and 1.7 blocks per game, and was named to the All-NBA Third Team, while Williams averaged 12.3 points, 7.3 assists and 1.4 steals per game, and led the Kings with 145 three-point field goals, despite only shooting .287 in three-point field-goal percentage, and Divac provided the team with 12.3 points, 8.0 rebounds, 1.3 steals and 1.3 blocks per game. In addition, second-year forward Peja Stojaković provided with 11.9 points per game and 100 three-point field goals off the bench, while Anderson contributed 10.8 points per game and 132 three-point field goals, and Corliss Williamson provided with 10.3 points per game. Off the bench, three-point specialist Jon Barry contributed 8.0 points per game, and Scot Pollard averaged 5.4 points and 5.3 rebounds per game.

During the NBA All-Star weekend at The Arena in Oakland in Oakland, California, Webber was selected for the 2000 NBA All-Star Game, as a member of the Western Conference All-Star team. Meanwhile, Williams was selected for the NBA Rookie Challenge Game, as a member of the Sophomores team, and also participated in the NBA 2Ball Competition, along with Yolanda Griffith of the WNBA's Sacramento Monarchs. Webber also finished in ninth place in Most Valuable Player voting, while Stojaković finished tied in sixth place in Sixth Man of the Year voting.

The Kings finished twelfth in the NBA in home-game attendance, with an attendance of 720,033 at the ARCO Arena II during the regular season.

=== NBA playoffs ===
In the Western Conference First Round of the 2000 NBA playoffs, the Kings faced off against the top–seeded, and Pacific Division champion Los Angeles Lakers, who were led by the trio of All-Star center, and Most Valuable Player of the Year, Shaquille O'Neal, All-Star guard Kobe Bryant, and Glen Rice. The Kings lost the first two games to the Lakers on the road at the Staples Center, but managed to win the next two games at home, which included a Game 4 win over the Lakers at the ARCO Arena II, 101–88 to even the series. However, the Kings lost Game 5 to the Lakers at the Staples Center, 113–86, thus losing in a hard-fought five-game series.

The Lakers would advance to the 2000 NBA Finals to defeat the Indiana Pacers in six games.

=== Aftermath ===
Following the season, Williamson was traded to the Toronto Raptors, while Corbin signed as a free agent with the Raptors, and Delk signed with the Phoenix Suns.

== Draft picks ==
Round	Pick	Player	Position	Nationality	College
2	45	Ryan Robertson	SG	United States	Kansas

== Roster ==
1999–2000 Sacramento Kings roster
Players

Pos.	No.	Player	Height	Weight	DOB	From
G	25	Nick Anderson	6 ft 6 in (1.98 m)	205 lb (93 kg)	1968–01–20	Illinois
G	20	Jon Barry	6 ft 4 in (1.93 m)	195 lb (88 kg)	1969–07–25	Georgia Tech
G/F	23	Tyrone Corbin	6 ft 6 in (1.98 m)	210 lb (95 kg)	1962–12–31	DePaul
G	00	Tony Delk	6 ft 1 in (1.85 m)	189 lb (86 kg)	1974–01–28	Kentucky
C	21	Vlade Divac	7 ft 1 in (2.16 m)	243 lb (110 kg)	1968–02–03	Serbia
F	51	Lawrence Funderburke	6 ft 9 in (2.06 m)	230 lb (104 kg)	1970–12–15	Ohio State
C	53	Jerome James (IN)	7 ft 0 in (2.13 m)	300 lb (136 kg)	1975–11–17	Florida A&M
G	15	Darrick Martin	5 ft 11 in (1.80 m)	170 lb (77 kg)	1971–03–06	UCLA
F/C	31	Scot Pollard	6 ft 11 in (2.11 m)	265 lb (120 kg)	1975–02–12	Kansas
G	10	Ryan Robertson	6 ft 5 in (1.96 m)	190 lb (86 kg)	1976–10–02	Kansas
F	16	Peja Stojaković	6 ft 9 in (2.06 m)	220 lb (100 kg)	1977–06–09	Serbia
F/C	4	Chris Webber	6 ft 10 in (2.08 m)	245 lb (111 kg)	1973–03–01	Michigan
C	7	Bill Wennington	7 ft 0 in (2.13 m)	245 lb (111 kg)	1963–04–26	St. John's
G	55	Jason Williams	6 ft 1 in (1.85 m)	190 lb (86 kg)	1975–11–18	Florida
F	34	Corliss Williamson	6 ft 7 in (2.01 m)	245 lb (111 kg)	1973–12–04	Arkansas

Coaches
Head coach
- Rick Adelman
Assistant(s)
- Pete Carril
- Byron Scott
- John Wetzel

Legend
- (DP) Unsigned draft pick
- (FA) Free agent
- (S) Suspended
- (IN) Inactive
- Injured

Roster
Updated: October 29, 1999

=== Roster Notes ===
- Center Jerome James was on the injured reserve list due to a knee injury, and missed the entire regular season.

== Regular season ==
=== Season standings ===
Pacific Division	W	L	PCT	GB	Home	Road	Div
y-Los Angeles Lakers	67	15	.817	–	36–5	31–10	20–4
x-Portland Trail Blazers	59	23	.720	8	30–11	29–12	21–3
x-Phoenix Suns	53	29	.646	14	32–9	21–20	15–9
x-Seattle SuperSonics	45	37	.549	22	24–17	21–20	12–12
x-Sacramento Kings	44	38	.537	23	30–11	14–27	9–15
Golden State Warriors	19	63	.232	48	12–29	7–34	2–22
Los Angeles Clippers	15	67	.183	52	10–31	5–36	5–19

#	Western Conference				
#	Team	W	L	PCT	GB
1	z-Los Angeles Lakers	67	15	.817	–
2	y-Utah Jazz	55	27	.671	12
3	x-Portland Trail Blazers	59	23	.720	8
4	x-San Antonio Spurs	53	29	.646	14
5	x-Phoenix Suns	53	29	.646	14
6	x-Minnesota Timberwolves	50	32	.610	17
7	x-Seattle SuperSonics	45	37	.549	22
8	x-Sacramento Kings	44	38	.537	23
9	Dallas Mavericks	40	42	.488	27
10	Denver Nuggets	35	47	.427	32
11	Houston Rockets	34	48	.415	33
12	Vancouver Grizzlies	22	60	.268	45
13	Golden State Warriors	19	63	.232	48
14	Los Angeles Clippers	15	67	.183	52

z – clinched division title
y – clinched division title
x – clinched playoff spot

=== Game log ===
1999–2000 game log
Total: 44–38 (home: 30–11; road: 14–27)
November: 10–2 (home: 7–0; road: 3–2)

Game	Date	Team	Score	High points	High rebounds	High assists	Location Attendance	Record
1	November 5	Minnesota	W 100–95	Nick Anderson (17)	Chris Webber (15)	Jason Williams (6)	Tokyo Dome; 32,623	1–0
2	November 6	@ Minnesota	L 101–114	Chris Webber (22)	Chris Webber (10)	Jason Williams (8)	Tokyo Dome; 34,013	1–1
3	November 12	Utah	W 105–92	Chris Webber (20)	Chris Webber (9)	Jason Williams (5)	ARCO Arena; 17,317	2–1
4	November 14	Denver	W 126–116	Chris Webber (32)	Webber, Divac (12)	Jason Williams (6)	ARCO Arena; 15,491	3–1
5	November 16	Vancouver	W 81–77	Chris Webber (19)	Tyrone Corbin (10)	Webber, Williams (4)	ARCO Arena; 14,169	4–1
6	November 18	@ Houston	W 128–110	Jason Williams (23)	Scot Pollard (9)	Jason Williams (10)	Compaq Center; 14,898	5–1
7	November 19	@ Dallas	W 103–94	Chris Webber (24)	Webber, Divac (11)	Darrick Martin (5)	Reunion Arena; 15,507	6–1
8	November 21	Houston	W 110–105	Chris Webber (28)	Chris Webber (11)	Jason Williams (12)	ARCO Arena; 17,317	7–1
9	November 23	New Jersey	W 105–92	Chris Webber (26)	Chris Webber (22)	Chris Webber (10)	ARCO Arena; 17,021	8–1
10	November 26	Golden State	W 124–95	Chris Webber (20)	Chris Webber (9)	Jason Williams (12)	ARCO Arena; 17,317	9–1
11	November 29	@ Miami	L 88–98	Chris Webber (18)	Chris Webber (10)	Jason Williams (8)	Miami Arena; 14,723	9–2
12	November 30	@ Orlando	W 111–102	Chris Webber (22)	Anderson, Webber (11)	Anderson, Williams (5)	Orlando Arena; 14,439	10–2

December: 7–8 (home: 4–2; road: 3–6)

Game	Date	Team	Score	High points	High rebounds	High assists	Location Attendance	Record
13	December 2	@ Atlanta	L 100–110	Chris Webber (26)	Vlade Divac (11)	Jason Williams (12)	Philips Arena; 14,537	10–3
14	December 4	@ Washington	W 114–104	Chris Webber (25)	Chris Webber (11)	Chris Webber (10)	MCI Center; 19,220	11–3
15	December 6	@ New Jersey	L 95–109	Chris Webber (25)	Chris Webber (14)	Jason Williams (7)	Continental Airlines Arena; 13,127	11–4
16	December 8	L.A. Lakers	W 103–91	Chris Webber (20)	Chris Webber (12)	Jason Williams (5)	ARCO Arena; 17,317	12–4
17	December 10	Miami	L 97–107	Chris Webber (26)	Chris Webber (10)	Jason Williams (12)	ARCO Arena; 17,317	12–5
18	December 11	Portland	L 96–101	Chris Webber (36)	Chris Webber (12)	Jason Williams (12)	ARCO Arena; 17,317	12–6
19	December 15	@ Vancouver	W 109–106	Chris Webber (21)	Chris Webber (13)	Vlade Divac (6)	General Motors Place; 12,490	13–6
20	December 16	@ Denver	L 106–116	Chris Webber (26)	Vlade Divac (7)	Jason Williams (7)	Pepsi Center; 15,576	13–7
21	December 18	@ Phoenix	L 103–119	Jason Williams (22)	Vlade Divac (11)	Jason Williams (8)	America West Arena; 19,023	13–8
22	December 20	@ Golden State	L 99–111	Corliss Williamson (24)	Tony Delk (11)	Jason Williams (11)	The Arena in Oakland; 15,176	13–9
23	December 21	Milwaukee	W 108–95	Jason Williams (28)	Vlade Divac (12)	Jason Williams (6)	ARCO Arena; 17,317	14–9
24	December 23	@ L.A. Clippers	L 91–97	Chris Webber (33)	Corliss Williamson (11)	Vlade Divac (8)	Staples Center; 14,315	14–10
25	December 26	Dallas	W 118–111	Chris Webber (31)	Vlade Divac (13)	Jason Williams (8)	ARCO Arena; 17,317	15–10
26	December 28	Boston	W 114–101	Chris Webber (23)	Chris Webber (11)	Jason Williams (7)	ARCO Arena; 17,317	16–10
27	December 29	@ Seattle	W 113–104	Chris Webber (31)	Chris Webber (10)	Darrick Martin (7)	KeyArena; 17,072	17–10

January: 10–6 (home: 6–1; road: 4–5)

Game	Date	Team	Score	High points	High rebounds	High assists	Location Attendance	Record
28	January 4	@ Cleveland	W 111–107	Chris Webber (37)	Chris Webber (10)	Jason Williams (18)	Gund Arena; 14,875	18–10
29	January 6	@ Toronto	L 89–101	Chris Webber (27)	Chris Webber (19)	Jason Williams (4)	Air Canada Centre; 19,800	18–11
30	January 7	@ Boston	L 93–101	Nick Anderson (24)	Chris Webber (11)	Jason Williams (7)	FleetCenter; 18,624	18–12
31	January 9	Indiana	W 116–113	Chris Webber (31)	Corliss Williamson (9)	Jason Williams (15)	ARCO Arena; 17,317	19–12
32	January 11	Houston	W 110–93	Chris Webber (26)	Chris Webber (12)	Jason Williams (5)	ARCO Arena; 17,317	20–12
33	January 13	San Antonio	W 107–103	Chris Webber (34)	Chris Webber (19)	Williams, Webber, Divac (3)	ARCO Arena; 17,317	21–12
34	January 15	@ Golden State	W 114–99	Chris Webber (37)	Chris Webber (16)	Jason Williams (10)	The Arena in Oakland; 18,372	22–12
35	January 16	Cleveland	W 113–102	Chris Webber (25)	Chris Webber (11)	Jason Williams (10)	ARCO Arena; 17,317	23–12
36	January 18	L.A. Clippers	W 104–98	Chris Webber (30)	Vlade Divac (11)	Jason Williams (12)	ARCO Arena; 17,317	24–12
37	January 20	Orlando	W 111–103	Divac, Stojaković (17)	Vlade Divac (12)	Jason Williams (8)	ARCO Arena; 17,317	25–12
38	January 22	Utah	L 101–104	Jason Williams (22)	Vlade Divac (10)	Jason Williams (6)	ARCO Arena; 17,317	25–13
39	January 25	@ Charlotte	W 110–99	Chris Webber (30)	Vlade Divac (12)	Jason Williams (9)	Charlotte Coliseum; 17,370	26–13
40	January 26	@ Milwaukee	L 104–112	Nick Anderson (24)	Vlade Divac (12)	Jason Williams (11)	Bradley Center; 16,931	26–14
41	January 28	@ Chicago	W 102–90	Chris Webber (24)	Chris Webber (12)	Jason Williams (9)	United Center; 22,292	27–14
42	January 30	@ New York	L 111–120	Chris Webber (26)	Webber, Divac (6)	Jason Williams (12)	Madison Square Garden; 19,763	27–15
43	January 31	@ Minnesota	L 90–105	Chris Webber (14)	Chris Webber (7)	Jason Williams (7)	Target Center; 18,046	27–16

February: 5–8 (home: 4–3; road: 1–5)

Game	Date	Team	Score	High points	High rebounds	High assists	Location Attendance	Record
44	February 2	@ Detroit	W 113–110	Chris Webber (39)	Chris Webber (11)	Jason Williams (11)	The Palace of Auburn Hills; 20,259	28–16
45	February 4	@ Indiana	L 94–104	Chris Webber (32)	Chris Webber (14)	Jason Williams (8)	Conseco Fieldhouse; 18,345	28–17
46	February 6	@ Philadelphia	L 108–119	Chris Webber (32)	Chris Webber (14)	Webber, Williams (7)	First Union Center; 20,718	28–18
47	February 8	Chicago	W 119–80	Chris Webber (22)	Webber, Divac (10)	Jason Williams (8)	ARCO Arena; 17,317	29–18
48	February 10	Denver	W 96–84	Chris Webber (22)	Chris Webber (14)	Jason Williams (8)	ARCO Arena; 17,317	30–18
49	February 15	Phoenix	L 108–117	Chris Webber (27)	Chris Webber (9)	Jason Williams (8)	ARCO Arena; 17,317	30–19
50	February 17	@ Utah	L 108–119	Chris Webber (22)	Scot Pollard (9)	Jason Williams (9)	Delta Center; 19,911	30–20
51	February 18	Seattle	W 118–85	Peja Stojaković (21)	Scot Pollard (14)	Jason Williams (7)	ARCO Arena; 17,317	31–20
52	February 20	Portland	L 103–108 (OT)	Chris Webber (33)	Chris Webber (19)	Chris Webber (7)	ARCO Arena; 17,317	31–21
53	February 21	@ Denver	L 117–123 (OT)	Peja Stojaković (30)	Chris Webber (15)	Jason Williams (8)	Pepsi Center; 18,527	31–22
54	February 23	Atlanta	L 94–100	Chris Webber (28)	Chris Webber (20)	Jason Williams (7)	ARCO Arena; 17,317	31–23
55	February 26	@ Vancouver	L 90–102	Chris Webber (36)	Webber, Divac (10)	Vlade Divac (7)	General Motors Place; 17,856	31–24
56	February 29	Vancouver	W 112–87	Chris Webber (23)	Scot Pollard (10)	Jason Williams (8)	ARCO Arena; 17,317	32–24

March: 9–6 (home: 7–1; road: 2–5)

Game	Date	Team	Score	High points	High rebounds	High assists	Location Attendance	Record
57	March 2	@ Houston	L 99–102	Chris Webber (29)	Chris Webber (11)	Jon Barry (8)	Compaq Center; 15,754	32–25
58	March 4	@ San Antonio	W 108–103 (OT)	Chris Webber (31)	Scot Pollard (9)	Chris Webber (5)	Alamodome; 35,113	33–25
59	March 6	Dallas	W 130–109	Chris Webber (22)	Webber, Divac (10)	Chris Webber (11)	ARCO Arena; 17,317	34–25
60	March 8	Charlotte	W 105–92	Vlade Divac (27)	Vlade Divac (11)	Jason Williams (6)	ARCO Arena; 17,317	35–25
61	March 10	Toronto	W 103–88	Chris Webber (25)	Chris Webber (12)	Corliss Williamson (6)	ARCO Arena; 17,317	36–25
62	March 12	@ L.A. Lakers	L 106–109	Chris Webber (24)	Vlade Divac (13)	Jason Williams (8)	Staples Center; 18,997	36–26
63	March 14	@ Portland	L 91–96	Peja Stojaković (22)	Chris Webber (11)	Webber, Divac (5)	Rose Garden; 20,499	36–27
64	March 15	L.A. Clippers	W 98–78	Chris Webber (25)	Vlade Divac (15)	Webber, Divac, Williams (4)	ARCO Arena; 17,317	37–27
65	March 18	@ L.A. Clippers	W 104–83	Divac, Stojaković (20)	Chris Webber (9)	Chris Webber (5)	Staples Center; 18,964	38–27
66	March 21	Washington	W 98–86	Vlade Divac (24)	Vlade Divac (12)	Anderson, Williams (3)	ARCO Arena; 17,317	39–27
67	March 22	@ Phoenix	L 93–114	Chris Webber (16)	Chris Webber (6)	Jason Williams (7)	America West Arena; 19,023	39–28
68	March 24	Detroit	W 113–103	Chris Webber (29)	Chris Webber (14)	Jason Williams (10)	ARCO Arena; 17,317	40–28
69	March 26	L.A. Lakers	L 89–90	Chris Webber (28)	Chris Webber (15)	Chris Webber (8)	ARCO Arena; 17,317	40–29
70	March 28	New York	W 103–95	Chris Webber (21)	Chris Webber (10)	Chris Webber (11)	ARCO Arena; 17,317	41–29
71	March 31	@ Seattle	L 108–123	Chris Webber (22)	Chris Webber (12)	Jason Williams (10)	KeyArena; 16,274	41–30

April: 3–8 (home: 2–4; road: 1–4)

Game	Date	Team	Score	High points	High rebounds	High assists	Location Attendance	Record
72	April 2	Philadelphia	W 117–95	Chris Webber (26)	Vlade Divac (11)	Vlade Divac (11)	ARCO Arena; 17,317	42–30
73	April 4	@ Dallas	L 102–105	Corliss Williamson (20)	Vlade Divac (10)	Jason Williams (10)	Reunion Arena; 14,029	42–31
74	April 5	@ San Antonio	W 108–98	Corliss Williamson (28)	Corliss Williamson (11)	Jason Williams (8)	Alamodome; 24,333	43–31
75	April 7	Minnesota	L 92–95	Vlade Divac (20)	Vlade Divac (12)	Vlade Divac (9)	ARCO Arena; 17,317	43–32
76	April 9	Phoenix	L 97–102	Jason Williams (24)	Chris Webber (13)	Chris Webber (5)	ARCO Arena; 17,317	43–33
77	April 11	San Antonio	L 92–98 (OT)	Jason Williams (17)	Chris Webber (12)	Jason Williams (9)	ARCO Arena; 17,317	43–34
78	April 13	Golden State	W 130–107	Chris Webber (22)	Vlade Divac (11)	Webber, Williams, Stojaković (5)	ARCO Arena; 17,317	44–34
79	April 14	@ L.A. Lakers	L 114–121	Chris Webber (36)	Chris Webber (10)	Jason Williams (9)	Staples Center; 18,997	44–35
80	April 16	@ Portland	L 95–102	Chris Webber (21)	Vlade Divac (14)	Chris Webber (8)	Rose Garden; 20,584	44–36
81	April 18	Seattle	L 112–119 (OT)	Webber, Williams (23)	Scot Pollard (11)	Chris Webber (13)	ARCO Arena; 17,317	44–37
82	April 19	@ Utah	L 86–95	Darrick Martin (16)	Divac, Wennington (10)	Darrick Martin (4)	Delta Center; 19,911	44–38

1999–00 schedule

== Playoffs ==
2000 playoff game log
First round: 2–3 (home: 2–0; road: 0–3)

Game	Date	Team	Score	High points	High rebounds	High assists	Location Attendance	Series
1	April 23	@ L.A. Lakers	L 107–117	Chris Webber (28)	Lawrence Funderburke (6)	Vlade Divac (8)	Staples Center; 18,997	0–1
2	April 27	@ L.A. Lakers	L 89–113	Chris Webber (22)	Chris Webber (12)	Chris Webber (6)	Staples Center; 18,997	0–2
3	April 30	L.A. Lakers	W 99–91	Chris Webber (29)	Chris Webber (14)	Chris Webber (8)	ARCO Arena; 17,317	1–2
4	May 2	L.A. Lakers	W 101–88	Chris Webber (23)	Chris Webber (13)	Chris Webber (8)	ARCO Arena; 17,317	2–2
5	May 5	@ L.A. Lakers	L 86–113	Chris Webber (20)	Tony Delk (6)	Barry, Webber (4)	Staples Center; 18,997	2–3

2000 schedule

== Player statistics ==
Legend
GP	Games played	GS	Games started	MPG	Minutes per game
FG%	Field-goal percentage	3P%	3-point field-goal percentage	FT%	Free-throw percentage
RPG	Rebounds per game	APG	Assists per game	SPG	Steals per game
BPG	Blocks per game	PPG	Points per game

=== Season ===
Player	GP	GS	MPG	FG%	3P%	FT%	RPG	APG	SPG	BPG	PPG
Nick Anderson	72	72	29.1	.391	.332	.487	4.7	1.7	1.3	0.2	10.8
Jon Barry	62	1	20.7	.465	.429	.922	2.6	2.4	1.2	0.1	8.0
Tyrone Corbin	54	5	17.4	.356	.227	.846	3.1	1.1	0.7	0.1	4.1
Tony Delk	46	1	14.8	.430	.225	.797	1.9	1.2	0.8	0.1	6.4
Vlade Divac	82	81	29.0	.503	.269	.691	8.0	3.0	1.3	1.3	12.3
Lawrence Funderburke	75	1	13.7	.523	.000	.706	3.1	0.4	0.4	0.3	6.4
Darrick Martin	71	1	12.6	.380	.306	.824	0.6	1.7	0.4	0.0	5.7
Scot Pollard	76	5	17.6	.527		.717	5.3	0.6	0.7	0.8	5.4
Ryan Robertson	1	0	25.0	.333	.000	1.000	0.0	0.0	0.0	0.0	5.0
Peja Stojaković	74	11	23.6	.448	.375	.882	3.7	1.4	0.7	0.1	11.9
Chris Webber	75	75	38.4	.483	.284	.751	10.5	4.6	1.6	1.7	24.5
Bill Wennington	7	0	8.1	.316		1.000	2.7	0.1	0.3	0.3	2.0
Jason Williams	81	81	34.1	.373	.287	.753	2.8	7.3	1.4	0.1	12.3
Corliss Williamson	76	76	22.5	.500		.769	3.8	1.1	0.5	0.3	10.3

=== Playoffs ===
Player	GP	GS	MPG	FG%	3P%	FT%	RPG	APG	SPG	BPG	PPG
Nick Anderson	5	5	26.4	.324	.350	.875	3.4	0.4	0.2	0.6	7.2
Jon Barry	5	0	20.4	.429	.583	.875	2.4	2.4	0.6	0.0	7.8
Tyrone Corbin	3	0	7.7	.400	.000	.000	1.7	1.0	0.0	0.0	1.3
Tony Delk	5	0	20.2	.439	.600	.739	3.6	1.4	0.6	0.0	11.2
Vlade Divac	5	5	32.0	.357	.000	.696	7.2	2.8	1.4	0.8	11.2
Lawrence Funderburke	4	0	8.5	.444		.500	2.8	0.0	0.3	0.0	2.5
Darrick Martin	2	0	10.5	.333	.333	.750	1.5	1.0	0.5	0.0	5.0
Scot Pollard	5	0	14.0	.563		.333	3.2	0.2	0.4	0.2	4.0
Peja Stojaković	5	0	25.8	.400	.462	.667	3.4	0.6	0.8	0.0	8.8
Chris Webber	5	5	39.2	.427	.200	.794	9.6	5.4	1.6	2.0	24.4
Jason Williams	5	5	29.0	.375	.320	.800	1.6	2.4	0.6	0.0	10.4
Corliss Williamson	5	5	17.4	.688		.917	3.0	0.2	0.2	0.0	6.6

Player statistics citation:

== Awards and records ==
- Chris Webber, All-NBA Third Team
