= 1999–2000 Houston Rockets season =

- Head coach: Rudy Tomjanovich
- General manager: Carroll Dawson
- Owner: Leslie Alexander
- Arena: Compaq Center

Results
- Record: 34–48 (.415)
- Place: Division: 6th (Midwest); Conference: 11th (Western)
- Playoff finish: Did not qualify
- Stats at Basketball Reference

Local media
- Television: KHWB; Fox Sports Net Southwest
- Radio: KTRH

The 1999–2000 Houston Rockets season was the 33rd season for the Houston Rockets in the National Basketball Association, and their 29th season in Houston, Texas.

== Season summary ==
=== Off-season ===
This season was notable for the Rockets acquiring rookie point guard, and first-round draft pick Steve Francis from the University of Maryland in a trade from the Vancouver Grizzlies; the Grizzlies had drafted Francis with the second overall pick in the 1999 NBA draft, but he refused to play for them. In the draft, the Rockets selected power forward Kenny Thomas from the University of New Mexico with the 22nd overall pick. During the off-season, the team acquired Walt Williams, Kelvin Cato and Carlos Rogers from the Portland Trail Blazers, and signed free agent Shandon Anderson.

=== Regular season ===
Despite the addition of Francis, Anderson, Williams, Thomas and Cato, the Rockets got off to a bad start by losing ten of their first twelve games of the regular season. The team posted a six-game winning streak in January, and later on held a 20–30 record at the All-Star break. However, the Rockets posted an eight-game losing streak in March, as Hakeem Olajuwon only played just 44 games due to a hernia injury, and breathing problems. The Rockets won seven of their final ten games of the season, and finished in sixth place in the Midwest Division with a 34–48 record, failing to qualify for the NBA playoffs for the first time since the 1991–92 season.

Francis averaged 18.0 points, 5.3 rebounds, 6.6 assists and 1.5 steals per game, led the Rockets with 107 three-point field goals, and was also named the co-NBA Rookie of the Year along with Elton Brand of the Chicago Bulls; he was also named to the NBA All-Rookie First Team. In addition, second-year guard Cuttino Mobley played a sixth man role off the bench, averaging 15.8 points per game along with 104 three-point field goals, while Charles Barkley averaged 14.5 points and 10.5 rebounds per game, but only played just 20 games due to a knee injury, and Anderson provided the team with 12.3 points per game. Meanwhile, Williams contributed 10.9 points per game and 102 three-point field goals, Olajuwon averaged 10.3 points, 6.2 rebounds and 1.6 blocks per game, and Cato provided with 8.7 points, 6.0 rebounds and 1.9 blocks per game. Off the bench, Thomas averaged 8.3 points and 6.1 rebounds per game, and Rogers contributed 8.0 points and 5.2 rebounds per game.

During the NBA All-Star weekend at The Arena in Oakland in Oakland, California, Francis and Mobley were both selected for the NBA Rookie Challenge Game, as Francis was a member of the Rookies team, while Mobley was a member of the Sophomores team. Francis scored 13 points along with 11 assists, as the Rookies defeated the Sophomores in overtime, 92–83. In addition, Francis participated in the NBA Slam Dunk Contest, in which he finished in second place behind Vince Carter of the Toronto Raptors, and also participated in the NBA 2Ball Competition, along with Cynthia Cooper of the WNBA's Houston Comets. Mobley finished in second place in Sixth Man of the Year voting, behind Rodney Rogers of the Phoenix Suns.

The Rockets finished 20th in the NBA in home-game attendance, with an attendance of 624,594 at the Compaq Center during the regular season.

=== Aftermath ===
After he already announced in the off-season that the upcoming season would be his last, Barkley suffered a knee injury during an 83–73 road loss to his former team, the Philadelphia 76ers at the First Union Center on December 8, 1999. Barkley attempted to block a shot on 76ers' forward Tyrone Hill, as the injury forced an early end to his career. However, Barkley would return on April 19, 2000, against the Vancouver Grizzlies, his final NBA game; he came off the bench and scored on a put-back, scoring his final career points, after which he received a standing ovation. After the game, Barkley retired, ending his 16-year NBA career.

== Off-season ==
=== Draft picks ===
Round	Pick	Player	Position	Nationality	College
1	22	Kenny Thomas	PF/SF	United States	New Mexico
2	40	Tyrone Washington	C	United States	Mississippi State
2	50	Venson Hamilton	C	United States	Nebraska

== Roster ==
1999–2000 Houston Rockets roster
Players

Pos.	No.	Player	Height	Weight	DOB	From
G/F	40	Shandon Anderson	6 ft 6 in (1.98 m)	208 lb (94 kg)	1973–12–31	Georgia
F	4	Charles Barkley	6 ft 6 in (1.98 m)	252 lb (114 kg)	1963–02–20	Auburn
F/C	50	Matt Bullard	6 ft 10 in (2.08 m)	215 lb (98 kg)	1967–06–05	Iowa
F/C	13	Kelvin Cato	6 ft 11 in (2.11 m)	255 lb (116 kg)	1974–08–26	Iowa State
G	11	Bryce Drew (injured)	6 ft 2 in (1.88 m)	185 lb (84 kg)	1974–09–21	Valparaiso
G	3	Steve Francis	6 ft 3 in (1.91 m)	195 lb (88 kg)	1977–02–21	Maryland
F	9	Devin Gray	6 ft 7 in (2.01 m)	240 lb (109 kg)	1972–05–31	Clemson
F/C	44	Tony Massenburg (injured)	6 ft 9 in (2.06 m)	220 lb (100 kg)	1967–07–31	Maryland
F/C	2	Anthony Miller	6 ft 9 in (2.06 m)	225 lb (102 kg)	1971–10–22	Michigan State
G/F	5	Cuttino Mobley	6 ft 4 in (1.93 m)	190 lb (86 kg)	1975–09–01	Rhode Island
G	12	Moochie Norris	6 ft 1 in (1.85 m)	175 lb (79 kg)	1973–07–23	West Florida
C	34	Hakeem Olajuwon (injured)	7 ft 0 in (2.13 m)	255 lb (116 kg)	1963–01–21	Houston
F/C	6	Carlos Rogers	6 ft 11 in (2.11 m)	220 lb (100 kg)	1971–02–06	Tennessee State
F	21	Kenny Thomas	6 ft 7 in (2.01 m)	261 lb (118 kg)	1977–07–25	New Mexico
F	42	Walt Williams	6 ft 8 in (2.03 m)	219 lb (99 kg)	1970–04–16	Maryland

Coaches
Head coach
- Rudy Tomjanovich
Assistant(s)
- Jim Boylen
- Larry Smith
- Mike Wells

Legend
- (DP) Unsigned draft pick
- (FA) Free agent
- (S) Suspended
- Injured

Roster

=== Roster Notes ===
- Center Hakeem Olajuwon holds both American and Nigerian citizenship.

== Regular season ==
=== Season standings ===
Midwest Division	W	L	PCT	GB	Home	Road	Div
y-Utah Jazz	55	27	.671	–	31–10	24–17	14–10
x-San Antonio Spurs	53	29	.646	2	31–10	22–19	16–8
x-Minnesota Timberwolves	50	32	.610	5	26–15	24–17	18–6
Dallas Mavericks	40	42	.488	15	22–19	18–23	12–12
Denver Nuggets	35	47	.427	20	25–16	10–31	10–14
Houston Rockets	34	48	.415	21	22–19	12–29	8–16
Vancouver Grizzlies	22	60	.268	33	12–29	10–31	6–18

#	Western Conference				
#	Team	W	L	PCT	GB
1	z-Los Angeles Lakers	67	15	.817	–
2	y-Utah Jazz	55	27	.671	12
3	x-Portland Trail Blazers	59	23	.720	8
4	x-San Antonio Spurs	53	29	.646	14
5	x-Phoenix Suns	53	29	.646	14
6	x-Minnesota Timberwolves	50	32	.610	17
7	x-Seattle SuperSonics	45	37	.549	22
8	x-Sacramento Kings	44	38	.537	23
9	Dallas Mavericks	40	42	.488	27
10	Denver Nuggets	35	47	.427	32
11	Houston Rockets	34	48	.415	33
12	Vancouver Grizzlies	22	60	.268	45
13	Golden State Warriors	19	63	.232	48
14	Los Angeles Clippers	15	67	.183	52

z – clinched division title
y – clinched division title
x – clinched playoff spot

== Player statistics ==
Legend
GP	Games played	GS	Games started	MPG	Minutes per game
FG%	Field-goal percentage	3P%	3-point field-goal percentage	FT%	Free-throw percentage
RPG	Rebounds per game	APG	Assists per game	SPG	Steals per game
BPG	Blocks per game	PPG	Points per game

Player	GP	GS	MPG	FG%	3FG%	FT%	RPG	APG	SPG	BPG	PPG
Shandon Anderson	82	82	32.9	.473	.351	.767	4.7	2.9	1.2	.4	12.3
Charles Barkley	20	18	31.0	.477	.231	.645	10.5	3.2	.7	.2	14.5
Matt Bullard	56	27	18.3	.409	.446	.833	2.5	1.1	.3	.2	6.8
Kelvin Cato	65	32	24.3	.537	.000	.649	6.0	.4	.5	1.9	8.7
Bill Curley^{†}	4	0	12.5	.545			2.0	.0	.5	.0	3.0
Bryce Drew	72	5	18.0	.383	.362	.849	1.4	2.3	.6	.0	5.8
Steve Francis	77	77	36.1	.445	.345	.786	5.3	6.6	1.5	.4	18.0
Devin Gray	21	2	5.9	.405		.655	1.2	.2	.2	.1	2.3
Thomas Hamilton	22	7	12.4	.443		.522	4.1	.7	.2	.6	3.7
Tony Massenburg	10	0	10.9	.444		.875	2.7	.3	.2	.5	4.6
Anthony Miller	35	14	13.6	.536		.510	4.7	.5	.3	.3	3.7
Cuttino Mobley	81	8	30.8	.430	.356	.847	3.6	2.6	1.1	.4	15.8
Moochie Norris	30	0	16.7	.434	.414	.781	2.3	3.1	.8	.0	6.9
Hakeem Olajuwon	44	28	23.8	.458	.000	.616	6.2	1.4	.9	1.6	10.3
Carlos Rogers	53	15	20.8	.525	.071	.591	5.2	.8	.3	.6	8.0
Kenny Thomas	72	29	25.0	.399	.262	.660	6.1	1.6	.8	.3	8.3
Walt Williams	76	66	24.5	.458	.391	.821	4.0	2.1	.6	.6	10.9

Player statistics citation:

== Awards and records ==
- Steve Francis, NBA Rookie of the Year Award
- Steve Francis, NBA All-Rookie Team 1st Team
