= 1999–2000 Utah Jazz season =

NBA professional basketball team season

- Division champions
- Head coach: Jerry Sloan
- Arena: Delta Center

Results
- Record: 55–27 (.671)
- Place: Division: 1st (Midwest); Conference: 2nd (Western)
- Playoff finish: Conference semifinals (lost to Trail Blazers 1–4)
- Stats at Basketball Reference

Local media
- Television: KJZZ-TV; Fox Sports Net Utah
- Radio: KFNZ

The 1999–2000 Utah Jazz season was the 26th season for the Utah Jazz in the National Basketball Association, and their 21st season in Salt Lake City, Utah.

== Season summary ==
=== Off-season ===
During the off-season, the Jazz signed free agent Olden Polynice, then later on signed Armen Gilliam in January; Polynice became the team's starting center this season, with Greg Ostertag coming off the bench as a backup center. With aging players on their roster, the Jazz were the oldest team in the NBA.

=== Regular season ===
With the addition of Polynice, the Jazz got off to a solid 15–7 start to the regular season, which included a seven-game winning streak in December. However, the team posted a six-game losing streak between January and February, and held a 29–18 record at the All-Star break. The Jazz posted a nine-game winning streak between February and March, and finished in first place in the Midwest Division with a solid 55–27 record, earning the second seed in the Western Conference; the team qualified for the NBA playoffs for the 17th consecutive year.

Karl Malone averaged 25.5 points, 9.5 rebounds and 3.7 assists per game, and was named to the All-NBA Second Team, and also reached a milestone by scoring his 30,000th career point during this season. In addition, Bryon Russell averaged 14.1 points, 5.2 rebounds and 1.6 steals per game, and led the Jazz with 106 three-point field goals, while Jeff Hornacek contributed 12.4 points per game, John Stockton provided the team with 12.1 points, 8.6 assists and 1.7 steals per game, and sixth man Howard Eisley contributed 8.6 points and 4.2 assists per game off the bench. On the defensive side, Gilliam averaged 6.7 points and 4.2 rebounds per game in 50 games, while Polynice averaged 5.3 points and 5.5 rebounds per game, and Ostertag provided with 4.5 points, 6.0 rebounds and 2.1 blocks per game.

During the NBA All-Star weekend at The Arena in Oakland in Oakland, California, Malone and Stockton were both selected for the 2000 NBA All-Star Game, as members of the Western Conference All-Star team; it was Stockton's final All-Star appearance. Meanwhile, Hornacek participated in the NBA Three-Point Shootout for the third time, and also participated in the NBA 2Ball Competition, along with Natalie Williams of the WNBA's Utah Starzz; Hornacek won the Three-Point Shootout for the second consecutive year, and also won the 2Ball Competition along with Williams. Malone also finished in fourth place in Most Valuable Player voting, while head coach Jerry Sloan finished in fourth place in Coach of the Year voting.

The Jazz finished fifth in the NBA in home-game attendance, with an attendance of 801,268 at the Delta Center during the regular season.

=== NBA playoffs ===
In the Western Conference First Round of the 2000 NBA playoffs, the Jazz faced off against the 7th–seeded Seattle SuperSonics, a team that featured All-Star guard Gary Payton, Vin Baker and Brent Barry. The Jazz won the first two games over the SuperSonics at home at the Delta Center, before losing the next two games on the road, which included a Game 4 loss to the SuperSonics at the KeyArena at Seattle Center, 104–93. With the series tied at 2–2, the Jazz won Game 5 over the SuperSonics at the Delta Center, 96–93 to win in a hard-fought five-game series.

In the Western Conference Semi-finals, and for the second consecutive year, the team faced off against the 3rd–seeded Portland Trail Blazers, who were led by All-Star forward Rasheed Wallace, Scottie Pippen and Steve Smith. Despite the Jazz winning the Midwest Division title, the Trail Blazers had home-court advantage in the series, since the team finished with a better regular-season record than the Jazz. The Jazz lost the first three games to the Trail Blazers, but managed to win Game 4 at home, 88–85 at the Delta Center. However, the Jazz lost Game 5 to the Trail Blazers on the road, 81–79 at the Rose Garden Arena, thus losing the series in five games.

=== Aftermath ===
Following the season, Hornacek retired after fourteen seasons in the NBA. Meanwhile, Gilliam also retired, and Eisley and Adam Keefe were both involved in a four-team trade; Eisley was traded to the Dallas Mavericks, while Keefe was traded to the Golden State Warriors.

== Draft picks ==
Round	Pick	Player	Position	Nationality	College
1	19	Quincy Lewis	SF/SG	United States	Minnesota
1	24	Andrei Kirilenko	SF	Russia	
1	28	Scott Padgett	SF	United States	Kentucky
2	58	Eddie Lucas	SG	United States	Virginia Polytechnic

== Roster ==
1999–2000 Utah Jazz roster
Players

Pos.	No.	Player	Height	Weight	DOB	From
G	10	Howard Eisley	6 ft 2 in (1.88 m)	177 lb (80 kg)	1972–12–04	Boston College
F	5	Armen Gilliam	6 ft 9 in (2.06 m)	230 lb (104 kg)	1964–05–28	UNLV
G	14	Jeff Hornacek	6 ft 3 in (1.91 m)	190 lb (86 kg)	1963–05–03	Iowa State
F/C	31	Adam Keefe	6 ft 9 in (2.06 m)	230 lb (104 kg)	1970–02–22	Stanford
G/F	20	Quincy Lewis	6 ft 7 in (2.01 m)	215 lb (98 kg)	1977–06–26	Minnesota
F	32	Karl Malone	6 ft 9 in (2.06 m)	256 lb (116 kg)	1963–07–24	Louisiana Tech
C	39	Greg Ostertag	7 ft 2 in (2.18 m)	280 lb (127 kg)	1973–03–06	Kansas
F	34	Scott Padgett	6 ft 9 in (2.06 m)	240 lb (109 kg)	1976–04–19	Kentucky
C	0	Olden Polynice	6 ft 11 in (2.11 m)	220 lb (100 kg)	1964–11–21	Virginia
F	3	Bryon Russell	6 ft 7 in (2.01 m)	225 lb (102 kg)	1970–12–31	Long Beach State
G	12	John Stockton	6 ft 1 in (1.85 m)	175 lb (79 kg)	1962–03–26	Gonzaga
G	11	Jacque Vaughn	6 ft 1 in (1.85 m)	190 lb (86 kg)	1975–02–11	Kansas

Coaches
Head coach
- Jerry Sloan
Assistant(s)
- Gordon Chiesa
- David Fredman
- Phil Johnson
- Kenny Natt
- Mark McKown (player development)

Legend
- (DP) Unsigned draft pick
- (FA) Free agent
- (S) Suspended
- Injured

Roster

== Regular season ==
=== Season standings ===
Midwest Division	W	L	PCT	GB	Home	Road	Div
y-Utah Jazz	55	27	.671	–	31–10	24–17	14–10
x-San Antonio Spurs	53	29	.646	2	31–10	22–19	16–8
x-Minnesota Timberwolves	50	32	.610	5	26–15	24–17	18–6
Dallas Mavericks	40	42	.488	15	22–19	18–23	12–12
Denver Nuggets	35	47	.427	20	25–16	10–31	10–14
Houston Rockets	34	48	.415	21	22–19	12–29	8–16
Vancouver Grizzlies	22	60	.268	33	12–29	10–31	6–18

#	Western Conference				
#	Team	W	L	PCT	GB
1	z-Los Angeles Lakers	67	15	.817	–
2	y-Utah Jazz	55	27	.671	12
3	x-Portland Trail Blazers	59	23	.720	8
4	x-San Antonio Spurs	53	29	.646	14
5	x-Phoenix Suns	53	29	.646	14
6	x-Minnesota Timberwolves	50	32	.610	17
7	x-Seattle SuperSonics	45	37	.549	22
8	x-Sacramento Kings	44	38	.537	23
9	Dallas Mavericks	40	42	.488	27
10	Denver Nuggets	35	47	.427	32
11	Houston Rockets	34	48	.415	33
12	Vancouver Grizzlies	22	60	.268	45
13	Golden State Warriors	19	63	.232	48
14	Los Angeles Clippers	15	67	.183	52

== Playoffs ==
2000 playoff game log
First round: 3–2 (home: 3–0; road: 0–2)

Game	Date	Team	Score	High points	High rebounds	High assists	Location Attendance	Series
1	April 22	Seattle	W 104–93	Karl Malone (50)	Karl Malone (12)	Jeff Hornacek (11)	Delta Center; 19,911	1–0
2	April 24	Seattle	W 101–87	Karl Malone (23)	Greg Ostertag (12)	John Stockton (11)	Delta Center; 19,911	2–0
3	April 29	@ Seattle	L 78–89	Karl Malone (30)	three players tied (6)	John Stockton (13)	KeyArena; 16,713	2–1
4	May 3	@ Seattle	L 93–104	Bryon Russell (26)	Karl Malone (14)	John Stockton (12)	KeyArena; 16,631	2–2
5	May 5	Seattle	W 96–93	Karl Malone (27)	Karl Malone (8)	John Stockton (15)	Delta Center; 19,911	3–2

Conference Semi-finals: 1–4 (home: 1–1; road: 0–3)

Game	Date	Team	Score	High points	High rebounds	High assists	Location Attendance	Series
1	May 7	@ Portland	L 75–94	Karl Malone (22)	Malone, Polynice (8)	John Stockton (6)	Rose Garden; 20,351	0–1
2	May 9	@ Portland	L 85–103	Karl Malone (15)	Olden Polynice (6)	John Stockton (6)	Rose Garden; 20,463	0–2
3	May 11	Portland	L 84–103	Karl Malone (28)	Karl Malone (11)	John Stockton (12)	Delta Center; 19,911	0–3
4	May 14	Portland	W 88–85	Karl Malone (27)	Olden Polynice (11)	John Stockton (9)	Delta Center; 19,627	1–3
5	May 16	@ Portland	L 79–81	Karl Malone (27)	Karl Malone (11)	John Stockton (9)	Rose Garden; 20,043	1–4

2000 schedule

== Player statistics ==
Legend
GP	Games played	GS	Games started	MPG	Minutes per game
FG%	Field-goal percentage	3P%	3-point field-goal percentage	FT%	Free-throw percentage
RPG	Rebounds per game	APG	Assists per game	SPG	Steals per game
BPG	Blocks per game	PPG	Points per game

=== Season ===
Player	GP	GS	MPG	FG%	3FG%	FT%	RPG	APG	SPG	BPG	PPG
Pete Chilcutt^{†}	26	0	8.6	.355	.100	1.000	1.7	.4	.2	.2	1.8
Howard Eisley	82	5	25.6	.418	.368	.824	2.1	4.2	.7	.1	8.6
Armen Gilliam	50	0	15.6	.436	.000	.779	4.2	.8	.2	.3	6.7
Jeff Hornacek	77	77	27.7	.492	.478	.950	2.4	2.6	.9	.2	12.4
Adam Keefe	62	3	9.7	.408	.000	.806	2.2	.5	.3	.2	2.2
Quincy Lewis	74	0	12.1	.372	.365	.731	1.5	.5	.3	.2	3.8
Karl Malone	82	82	35.9	.509	.250	.797	9.5	3.7	1.0	.9	25.5
Greg Ostertag	81	3	19.8	.464	.000	.636	6.0	.2	.2	2.1	4.5
Scott Padgett	47	9	9.2	.314	.295	.704	1.9	.5	.3	.2	2.6
Olden Polynice	82	79	22.2	.510	.500	.311	5.5	.5	.4	1.0	5.3
Bryon Russell	82	70	35.4	.446	.396	.750	5.2	1.9	1.6	.3	14.1
John Stockton	82	82	29.7	.501	.355	.860	2.6	8.6	1.7	.2	12.1
Jacque Vaughn	78	0	11.3	.416	.412	.750	.8	1.6	.4	.0	3.7

=== Playoffs ===
Player	GP	GS	MPG	FG%	3FG%	FT%	RPG	APG	SPG	BPG	PPG
Howard Eisley	10	0	20.0	.309	.474	.889	1.8	1.9	.6	.1	5.1
Armen Gilliam	10	0	13.2	.326		.385	2.9	.4	.4	.4	3.5
Jeff Hornacek	10	10	29.7	.422	.409	.833	3.0	3.3	1.0	.0	11.5
Quincy Lewis	8	0	13.3	.370	.333	.800	1.9	.3	.4	.9	3.3
Karl Malone	10	10	38.6	.520	1.000	.810	8.9	3.1	.7	.7	27.2
Greg Ostertag	8	0	21.5	.526		.455	5.6	.3	.3	2.1	3.8
Scott Padgett	8	0	7.4	.375	.333		2.1	.6	.1	.3	1.9
Olden Polynice	10	10	26.0	.538		.500	6.6	.5	.3	.8	5.9
Bryon Russell	10	10	37.1	.421	.289	.756	5.2	2.1	1.6	.5	14.0
John Stockton	10	10	35.0	.461	.389	.767	3.0	10.3	1.3	.2	11.2
Jacque Vaughn	7	0	9.6	.357	.500	.875	1.7	1.6	.6	.1	4.0

Player statistics citation:

== Awards and records ==
- Karl Malone, All-NBA Second Team
