= 1999–2000 Golden State Warriors season =

NBA professional basketball team season

- Head coach: P. J. Carlesimo (fired); Garry St. Jean
- Owners: Chris Cohan
- Arena: The Arena in Oakland

Results
- Record: 19–63 (.232)
- Place: Division: 6th (Pacific); Conference: 13th (Western)
- Playoff finish: Did not qualify
- Stats at Basketball Reference

The 1999–2000 Golden State Warriors season was the 54th season for the Golden State Warriors in the National Basketball Association, and their 38th season in the San Francisco Bay Area. The city of Oakland, California hosted the NBA All-Star weekend at The Arena in Oakland this season, which featured the 2000 NBA All-Star Game.

== Season summary ==
=== Off-season ===
During the off-season, the Warriors acquired Mookie Blaylock from the Atlanta Hawks, and acquired rookie point guard, and first-round draft pick Vonteego Cummings out of the University of Pittsburgh from the Indiana Pacers.

=== Regular season ===
Despite the addition of Blaylock and Vonteego Cummings, the Warriors struggled losing 16 of their first 18 games of the regular season, as head coach P. J. Carlesimo was fired after a 6–21 start to the season, and was replaced with General Manager Garry St. Jean. The team suffered a 12-game losing streak between December and January, and later on held a 12–35 record at the All-Star break. Second-year star Antawn Jamison, Chris Mills, Erick Dampier and Terry Cummings all missed large parts of the season due to injuries. At mid-season, the Warriors traded John Starks to the Chicago Bulls, and acquired second-year guard Larry Hughes, and former Warriors forward Billy Owens from the Philadelphia 76ers in a three-team trade. The Warriors lost 23 of their final 26 games of the season, and finished in sixth place in the Pacific Division with a 19–63 record, missing the NBA playoffs for the sixth consecutive year.

Hughes averaged 22.7 points, 5.9 rebounds, 4.1 assists and 1.9 steals per game in 32 games after the trade, while Jamison showed improvement averaging 19.6 points and 8.3 rebounds per game, but only played just 43 games due to a season-ending knee injury. In addition, Donyell Marshall averaged 14.2 points and 10.0 rebounds per game, while Mills provided the team with 16.1 points and 6.2 rebounds per game in only just 20 games, Jason Caffey provided with 12.0 points and 6.8 rebounds per game, and Blaylock contributed 11.3 points, 6.7 assists and 2.0 steals per game, and led the Warriors with 101 three-point field goals. Meanwhile, Vonteego Cummings contributed 9.4 points and 3.3 assists per game, while on the defensive side, Dampier averaged 8.0 points and 6.4 rebounds per game in only just 21 games, Terry Cummings contributed 8.4 points and 4.9 rebounds per game in only just 22 games, Owens provided with 6.4 points and 6.8 rebounds per game in 16 games, and Adonal Foyle averaged 5.5 points, 5.6 rebounds and 1.8 blocks per game.

During the NBA All-Star weekend at The Arena in Oakland in Oakland, Jamison was selected for the NBA Rookie Challenge Game, as a member of the Sophomores team, and also selected to participate in the NBA Slam Dunk Contest; however, he did not participate in either event due to his knee injury. Before the mid-season trade, Hughes participated in the Slam Dunk Contest while playing for the 76ers. The Warriors finished last in the NBA in home-game attendance, with an attendance of 509,171 at The Arena in Oakland during the regular season, which was 29th in the league.

=== Aftermath ===
Following the season, Marshall was traded to the Utah Jazz in an off-season four-team trade, while Caffey and Owens were both dealt to the Milwaukee Bucks in a three-team trade, Terry Cummings retired, and St. Jean was fired as head coach.

== Offseason ==
=== Draft picks ===
Round	Pick	Player	Position	Nationality	College
1	21	Jeff Foster	PF/C	United States	Texas State
2	56	Tim Young	C	United States	Stanford

== Roster ==
1999–2000 Golden State Warriors roster
Players

Pos.	No.	Player	Height	Weight	DOB	From
G	10	Mookie Blaylock	6 ft 0 in (1.83 m)	180 lb (82 kg)	––	Oklahoma
F/C	21	Jason Caffey	6 ft 8 in (2.03 m)	255 lb (116 kg)	––	Alabama
F/C	35	Terry Cummings (injured)	6 ft 9 in (2.06 m)	220 lb (100 kg)	––	DePaul
G	5	Vonteego Cummings	6 ft 3 in (1.91 m)	185 lb (84 kg)	––	Pittsburgh
F	15	Bill Curley	6 ft 9 in (2.06 m)	220 lb (100 kg)	––	Boston College
C	25	Erick Dampier (injured)	6 ft 11 in (2.11 m)	265 lb (120 kg)	––	Mississippi State
F	4	Mark Davis	6 ft 7 in (2.01 m)	210 lb (95 kg)	––	Texas Tech
F/C	8	Tony Farmer	6 ft 9 in (2.06 m)	244 lb (111 kg)	––	Nebraska
C	31	Adonal Foyle	6 ft 10 in (2.08 m)	270 lb (122 kg)	––	Colgate
G/F	20	Larry Hughes	6 ft 5 in (1.96 m)	184 lb (83 kg)	––	Saint Louis
G	6	Sam Jacobson	6 ft 4 in (1.93 m)	215 lb (98 kg)	––	Minnesota
F	33	Antawn Jamison (injured)	6 ft 8 in (2.03 m)	223 lb (101 kg)	––	North Carolina
F	3	Donyell Marshall	6 ft 9 in (2.06 m)	218 lb (99 kg)	––	Connecticut
G/F	34	Chris Mills (injured)	6 ft 6 in (1.98 m)	215 lb (98 kg)	––	Arizona
F	30	Billy Owens	6 ft 8 in (2.03 m)	220 lb (100 kg)	––	Syracuse
C	55	Tim Young	7 ft 0 in (2.13 m)	220 lb (100 kg)	––	Stanford

Coaches
Head coach
- Garry St. Jean
Assistant(s)
- Dave Cowens
- Rod Higgins
- Brian Winters

Legend
- (DP) Unsigned draft pick
- (FA) Free agent
- (S) Suspended
- Injured

Roster

== Regular season ==
=== Season standings ===
Pacific Division	W	L	PCT	GB	Home	Road	Div
y-Los Angeles Lakers	67	15	.817	–	36–5	31–10	20–4
x-Portland Trail Blazers	59	23	.720	8	30–11	29–12	21–3
x-Phoenix Suns	53	29	.646	14	32–9	21–20	15–9
x-Seattle SuperSonics	45	37	.549	22	24–17	21–20	12–12
x-Sacramento Kings	44	38	.537	23	30–11	14–27	9–15
Golden State Warriors	19	63	.232	48	12–29	7–34	2–22
Los Angeles Clippers	15	67	.183	52	10–31	5–36	5–19

#	Western Conference				
#	Team	W	L	PCT	GB
1	z-Los Angeles Lakers	67	15	.817	–
2	y-Utah Jazz	55	27	.671	12
3	x-Portland Trail Blazers	59	23	.720	8
4	x-San Antonio Spurs	53	29	.646	14
5	x-Phoenix Suns	53	29	.646	14
6	x-Minnesota Timberwolves	50	32	.610	17
7	x-Seattle SuperSonics	45	37	.549	22
8	x-Sacramento Kings	44	38	.537	23
9	Dallas Mavericks	40	42	.488	27
10	Denver Nuggets	35	47	.427	32
11	Houston Rockets	34	48	.415	33
12	Vancouver Grizzlies	22	60	.268	45
13	Golden State Warriors	19	63	.232	48
14	Los Angeles Clippers	15	67	.183	52

z - clinched division title
y - clinched division title
x - clinched playoff spot

== Player statistics ==
Legend
GP	Games played	GS	Games started	MPG	Minutes per game
FG%	Field-goal percentage	3P%	3-point field-goal percentage	FT%	Free-throw percentage
RPG	Rebounds per game	APG	Assists per game	SPG	Steals per game
BPG	Blocks per game	PPG	Points per game

=== Regular season ===
Player	GP	GS	MPG	FG%	3P%	FT%	RPG	APG	SPG	BPG	PPG
Adonal Foyle	76	59	21.8	.508		.378	5.6	.6	.3	1.8	5.5
Vonteego Cummings	75	11	23.9	.405	.325	.751	2.5	3.3	1.2	.2	9.4
Tony Farmer	74	9	16.2	.407	.182	.766	4.0	1.0	.9	.2	6.3
Mookie Blaylock	73	72	33.7	.391	.336	.705	3.7	6.7	2.0	.3	11.3
Jason Caffey	71	56	30.4	.479	.000	.597	6.8	1.7	.9	.3	12.0
Donyell Marshall	64	51	32.4	.394	.355	.780	10.0	2.6	1.1	1.1	14.2
Sam Jacobson^{†}	49	5	13.5	.507	.375	.769	1.4	.6	.6	.1	5.0
Antawn Jamison	43	41	36.2	.471	.286	.611	8.3	2.1	.7	.3	19.6
John Starks^{†}	33	30	33.6	.378	.348	.833	2.8	5.2	1.1	.1	14.7
Larry Hughes^{†}	32	32	40.8	.389	.243	.736	5.9	4.1	1.9	.5	22.7
Tim Young	25	0	5.5	.333		.778	1.4	.2	.1	.0	2.2
Bill Curley^{†}	24	0	10.8	.404	.000	.720	1.8	.6	.5	.2	2.7
Mark Davis	23	7	20.2	.409	.000	.660	3.7	1.7	1.1	.2	6.2
Sam Mack	23	5	14.5	.303	.328	.950	1.7	1.0	.8	.0	5.0
Tim Legler	23	4	12.3	.359	.333	.778	1.0	1.0	.2	.0	3.3
Terry Cummings	22	0	18.1	.429		.821	4.9	1.0	.6	.4	8.4
Erick Dampier	21	12	23.6	.405		.529	6.4	.9	.4	.7	8.0
Chris Mills	20	11	32.5	.421	.267	.810	6.2	2.4	.9	.2	16.1
Billy Owens^{†}	16	4	24.1	.380	.286	.595	6.8	2.4	.4	.3	6.4
Damon Jones^{†}	13	1	15.1	.463	.478	.778	1.2	3.0	.5	.0	5.2
Drew Barry^{†}	8	0	10.6	.500	.333	.500	1.0	2.1	.3	.0	2.8
Chris Carr^{†}	7	0	10.6	.333	.125	.842	1.9	.4	.0	.1	5.6
Jamel Thomas^{†}	4	0	6.8	.375	.000		.8	1.0	.3	.0	1.5

- ^{†} Denotes player spent time with another team in the season. Stats reflect time with the Warriors only.

Player statistics citation:

== Transactions ==
=== Trades ===
June 30, 1999	To Golden State Warriors Vonteego Cummings; 2001 first-round pick	To Indiana Pacers Jeff Foster

February 16, 2000	To Golden State Warriors Larry Hughes (From Philadelphia); Billy Owens (From Philadelphia) To Philadelphia 76ers Toni Kukoč (From Chicago)	To Chicago Bulls Bruce Bowen (From Philadelphia); John Starks (From Golden State); 2000 first-round pick (From Golden State)

=== Free agents ===
Additions
Player	Date signed	Former team
Tim Legler	October 4	Washington Wizards
Bill Curley	October 4	Minnesota Timberwolves
Mark Davis	October 4	Miami Heat
Tony Farmer	October 4	N/A
Damon Jones	October 4	Boston Celtics
Chris Carr	December 1	New Jersey Nets
Bill Curley	December 6	Golden State Warriors
Drew Barry	December 17	Sydney Kings (Australia)
Jamel Thomas	December 29	Boston Celtics
Sam Mack	January 6	Houston Rockets
Jamel Thomas (10-day)	January 9	Golden State Warriors
Sam Jacobson (10-day)	January 11	Los Angeles Lakers
Mark Davis (10-day)	January 19	La Crosse Bobcats (CBA)
Sam Jacobson	January 31	Golden State Warriors
Bill Curley	March 21	Houston Rockets
Mark Davis	March 22	Golden State Warriors

Subtractions
Player	Date signed	New Team
Bill Curley	November 1	Golden State Warriors
Mark Davis	November 1	La Crosse Bobcats (CBA)
Damon Jones	November 30	Dallas Mavericks
Chris Carr	December 16	Chicago Bulls
Tim Legler	December 29	none
Jamel Thomas	January 3	Golden State Warriors
Drew Barry	January 5	Atlanta Hawks
Jamel Thomas	January 18	Quad City Thunder (CBA)
Sam Mack	March 20	Grand Rapids Hoops (CBA)

Player Transactions Citation:
