= 1999–2000 Minnesota Timberwolves season =

NBA professional basketball team season

- Head coach: Flip Saunders
- General manager: Kevin McHale
- Owner: Glen Taylor
- Arena: Target Center

Results
- Record: 50–32 (.610)
- Place: Division: 3rd (Midwest); Conference: 6th (Western)
- Playoff finish: First round (lost to Trail Blazers 1–3)
- Stats at Basketball Reference

The 1999–2000 Minnesota Timberwolves season was the 11th season for the Minnesota Timberwolves in the National Basketball Association.

== Season summary ==
=== Off-season ===
The Timberwolves acquired the sixth overall pick in the 1999 NBA draft from the New Jersey Nets via trade, and selected small forward Wally Szczerbiak out of Miami University; the team also selected point guard William Avery out of Duke University with the 14th overall pick.

=== Regular season ===
Early into the regular season, the Timberwolves traveled overseas to Tokyo, Japan to play their first two games against the Sacramento Kings at the Tokyo Dome. In the first game on November 5, 1999, the Timberwolves were the road team and lost to the Kings by a score of 100–95, in front of 32,623 fans in attendance. Kevin Garnett and Terrell Brandon both posted double-doubles, as Garnett finished with 34 points and 17 rebounds, while Brandon contributed 18 points and 12 assists, and Anthony Peeler added 17 points. In the second game on November 6, the Timberwolves were the home team and defeated the Kings by a score of 114–101, in front of 34,013 fans in attendance. Garnett and Brandon both posted double-doubles, as Garnett finished with 31 points and 12 rebounds, while Brandon contributed 15 points and 13 assists; Peeler scored 19 points, and Joe Smith added 17 points and 8 rebounds off the bench.

With the addition of Szczerbiak, the Timberwolves got off to a 7–5 start to the regular season, but then struggled posting an eight-game losing streak in December afterwards, falling below .500 in winning percentage. However, the team soon recovered and played above .500 for the remainder of the season, winning 20 of their next 25 games, and holding a 27–20 record at the All-Star break. The Timberwolves posted a six-game winning streak in March, and finished in third place in the Midwest Division with a 50–32 record, earning the sixth seed in the Western Conference; it was their first 50-win season in franchise history.

Garnett averaged 22.9 points, 11.8 rebounds, 5.0 assists, 1.5 steals and 1.6 blocks per game, and was named to the All-NBA First Team, and to the NBA All-Defensive First Team. In addition, Brandon averaged 17.1 points, 8.9 assists and 1.9 steals per game, while Szczerbiak provided the team with 11.6 points per game, and was named to the NBA All-Rookie First Team, and Malik Sealy contributed 11.3 points per game. Off the bench, Smith provided with 9.9 points and 6.2 rebounds per game, while Peeler contributed 9.8 points per game, Sam Mitchell averaged 6.5 points per game, second-year center Rasho Nesterovic averaged 5.7 points and 4.6 rebounds per game as the team's starting center, and Bobby Jackson contributed 5.1 points and 2.4 assists per game.

During the NBA All-Star weekend at The Arena in Oakland in Oakland, California, Garnett was selected for the 2000 NBA All-Star Game, as a member of the Western Conference All-Star team. Garnett scored 24 points along with 10 rebounds and 5 assists, as the Western Conference defeated the Eastern Conference, 137–126. Meanwhile, Szczerbiak was selected for the NBA Rookie Challenge Game, as a member of the Rookies team. Garnett finished in second place in Most Valuable Player voting, behind Shaquille O'Neal of the Los Angeles Lakers, and also finished in seventh place in Defensive Player of the Year voting.

The Timberwolves finished 14th in the NBA in home-game attendance, with an attendance of 690,012 at the Target Center during the regular season.

=== NBA playoffs ===
In the Western Conference First Round of the 2000 NBA playoffs, the Timberwolves faced off against the 3rd–seeded Portland Trail Blazers, who were led by All-Star forward Rasheed Wallace, Scottie Pippen and Steve Smith. The Timberwolves lost the first two games to the Trail Blazers on the road at the Rose Garden Arena, but managed to win Game 3 at home, 94–87 at the Target Center. However, the Timberwolves lost Game 4 to the Trail Blazers at home, 85–77, thus losing the series in four games; this was the fourth consecutive year that the Timberwolves lost in the opening round of the NBA playoffs.

=== Notable highlights ===
One notable highlight of the regular season occurred on January 17, 2000, in a home game against the Indiana Pacers at the Target Center. Sealy, a former Pacers player, hit a game winning three-point shot at the buzzer as the Timberwolves defeated the Pacers, 101–100.

=== Aftermath ===
Tragedy struck on May 20, 2000, when Sealy died in a car accident, in which he was killed by a drunk driver, who was driving on the wrong side of the road; Sealy, who was 30 years old, was just coming home from a birthday party for his teammate Garnett, who had just turned 24 years old the previous day on May 19. The driver involved in the crash, Souksangouane Phengsene, was sentenced to four years in prison.

Following the season, Jackson signed as a free agent with the Sacramento Kings.

== Draft picks ==
Round	Pick	Player	Position	Nationality	College
1	6	Wally Szczerbiak	SF	United States	Miami (OH)
1	14	William Avery	PG	United States	Duke
2	42	Louis Bullock	SG	United States	Michigan

== Roster ==
1999–2000 Minnesota Timberwolves roster
Players

Pos.	No.	Player	Height	Weight	DOB	From
PG	5	William Avery	6 ft 2 in (1.88 m)	197 lb (89 kg)	1979–08–08	Duke
PG	7	Terrell Brandon	5 ft 11 in (1.80 m)	180 lb (82 kg)	1970–05–20	Oregon
PF	21	Kevin Garnett	6 ft 11 in (2.11 m)	220 lb (100 kg)	1976–05–19	Farragut Academy (IL)
C	22	Dean Garrett	6 ft 10 in (2.08 m)	225 lb (102 kg)	1966–11–27	Indiana
PF	20	Tom Hammonds	6 ft 9 in (2.06 m)	215 lb (98 kg)	1967–03–27	Georgia Tech
PG	24	Bobby Jackson	6 ft 1 in (1.85 m)	185 lb (84 kg)	1973–03–13	Minnesota
SF	42	Sam Mitchell	6 ft 6 in (1.98 m)	210 lb (95 kg)	1963–09–02	Mercer
C	8	Rasho Nesterovic	7 ft 0 in (2.13 m)	255 lb (116 kg)	1976–05–30	Slovenia
PF	45	Andrae Patterson	6 ft 7 in (2.01 m)	238 lb (108 kg)	1975–11–12	Indiana
SG	1	Anthony Peeler	6 ft 4 in (1.93 m)	208 lb (94 kg)	1969–11–25	Missouri
SF	2	Malik Sealy	6 ft 8 in (2.03 m)	200 lb (91 kg)	1970–02–01	St. John's
C	32	Joe Smith	6 ft 10 in (2.08 m)	225 lb (102 kg)	1975–07–26	Maryland
SF	10	Wally Szczerbiak	6 ft 7 in (2.01 m)	244 lb (111 kg)	1977–03–05	Miami (OH)

Coaches
Head coach
- Flip Saunders
Assistant(s)
- Greg Ballard
- Sidney Lowe
- Jerry Sichting

Legend
- (DP) Unsigned draft pick
- (FA) Free agent
- (S) Suspended
- Injured

Roster
Updated: January 3, 2000

=== Roster notes ===
- Shooting guard Malik Sealy died in a car accident on May 20, 2000.

== Regular season ==
=== Season standings ===
Midwest Division	W	L	PCT	GB	Home	Road	Div
y-Utah Jazz	55	27	.671	–	31–10	24–17	14–10
x-San Antonio Spurs	53	29	.646	2	31–10	22–19	16–8
x-Minnesota Timberwolves	50	32	.610	5	26–15	24–17	18–6
Dallas Mavericks	40	42	.488	15	22–19	18–23	12–12
Denver Nuggets	35	47	.427	20	25–16	10–31	10–14
Houston Rockets	34	48	.415	21	22–19	12–29	8–16
Vancouver Grizzlies	22	60	.268	33	12–29	10–31	6–18

#	Western Conference				
#	Team	W	L	PCT	GB
1	z-Los Angeles Lakers	67	15	.817	–
2	y-Utah Jazz	55	27	.671	12
3	x-Portland Trail Blazers	59	23	.720	8
4	x-San Antonio Spurs	53	29	.646	14
5	x-Phoenix Suns	53	29	.646	14
6	x-Minnesota Timberwolves	50	32	.610	17
7	x-Seattle SuperSonics	45	37	.549	22
8	x-Sacramento Kings	44	38	.537	23
9	Dallas Mavericks	40	42	.488	27
10	Denver Nuggets	35	47	.427	32
11	Houston Rockets	34	48	.415	33
12	Vancouver Grizzlies	22	60	.268	45
13	Golden State Warriors	19	63	.232	48
14	Los Angeles Clippers	15	67	.183	52

z - clinched division title
y - clinched division title
x - clinched playoff spot

== Playoffs ==
2000 playoff game log
First Round: 1–3 (home: 1–1; road: 0–2)

Game	Date	Team	Score	High points	High rebounds	High assists	Location Attendance	Series
1	April 23	@ Portland	L 88–91	Malik Sealy (23)	Kevin Garnett (10)	Terrell Brandon (12)	Rose Garden; 19,980	0–1
2	April 26	@ Portland	L 82–86	Kevin Garnett (23)	Kevin Garnett (10)	Terrell Brandon (6)	Rose Garden; 20,568	0–2
3	April 30	Portland	W 94–87	Terrell Brandon (28)	Kevin Garnett (13)	Terrell Brandon (12)	Target Center; 19,006	1–2
4	May 2	Portland	L 77–85	Kevin Garnett (17)	Kevin Garnett (10)	Kevin Garnett (9)	Target Center; 19,006	1–3

2000 schedule

== Player statistics ==
=== Ragular season ===
Player	POS	GP	GS	MP	REB	AST	STL	BLK	PTS	MPG	RPG	APG	SPG	BPG	PPG
Malik Sealy	SF	82	61	2,392	352	197	76	19	929	29.2	4.3	2.4	.9	.2	11.3
Rasho Nesterović	C	82	55	1,723	379	93	21	85	471	21.0	4.6	1.1	.3	1.0	5.7
Anthony Peeler	SG	82	22	2,073	232	195	62	10	804	25.3	2.8	2.4	.8	.1	9.8
Kevin Garnett	PF	81	81	3,243	956	401	120	126	1,857	40.0	11.8	5.0	1.5	1.6	22.9
Joe Smith	C	78	9	1,975	484	88	45	85	774	25.3	6.2	1.1	.6	1.1	9.9
Wally Szczerbiak	SF	73	53	2,171	272	201	58	23	845	29.7	3.7	2.8	.8	.3	11.6
Bobby Jackson	PG	73	10	1,034	153	172	48	7	369	14.2	2.1	2.4	.7	.1	5.1
Terrell Brandon	PG	71	71	2,587	238	629	134	30	1,212	36.4	3.4	8.9	1.9	.4	17.1
Sam Mitchell	SF	66	24	1,227	138	111	27	14	427	18.6	2.1	1.7	.4	.2	6.5
William Avery	PG	59	1	484	40	88	14	2	154	8.2	.7	1.5	.2	.0	2.6
Dean Garrett	C	56	23	604	140	19	8	40	114	10.8	2.5	.3	.1	.7	2.0
Tom Hammonds	PF	56	0	372	101	10	8	3	117	6.6	1.8	.2	.1	.1	2.1
Andrae Patterson	PF	5	0	20	2	1	1	0	6	4.0	.4	.2	.2	.0	1.2

=== Playoffs ===
Player	POS	GP	GS	MP	REB	AST	STL	BLK	PTS	MPG	RPG	APG	SPG	BPG	PPG
Kevin Garnett	PF	4	4	171	43	35	5	3	75	42.8	10.8	8.8	1.3	.8	18.8
Terrell Brandon	PG	4	4	162	23	34	3	0	78	40.5	5.8	8.5	.8	.0	19.5
Rasho Nesterović	C	4	4	126	13	6	3	7	25	31.5	3.3	1.5	.8	1.8	6.3
Malik Sealy	SF	4	4	122	18	5	2	0	50	30.5	4.5	1.3	.5	.0	12.5
Wally Szczerbiak	SF	4	4	94	8	2	3	1	24	23.5	2.0	.5	.8	.3	6.0
Anthony Peeler	SG	4	0	90	9	5	3	1	30	22.5	2.3	1.3	.8	.3	7.5
Joe Smith	C	4	0	79	12	1	3	1	18	19.8	3.0	.3	.8	.3	4.5
Sam Mitchell	SF	4	0	68	7	2	0	1	23	17.0	1.8	.5	.0	.3	5.8
Bobby Jackson	PG	3	0	30	5	4	2	1	15	10.0	1.7	1.3	.7	.3	5.0
Dean Garrett	C	3	0	16	2	0	0	1	3	5.3	.7	.0	.0	.3	1.0
Tom Hammonds	PF	1	0	2	0	0	0	0	0	2.0	.0	.0	.0	.0	.0

== Awards and records ==
- Kevin Garnett, All-NBA First Team
- Kevin Garnett, NBA All-Defensive First Team
- Wally Szczerbiak, NBA All-Rookie Team 1st Team
