= 1999–2000 Vancouver Grizzlies season =

- Head coach: Brian Hill (fired); Lionel Hollins (interim)
- General manager: Stu Jackson
- Owners: Arthur Griffiths
- Arena: General Motors Place

Results
- Record: 22–60 (.268)
- Place: Division: 7th (Midwest); Conference: 12th (Western)
- Playoff finish: Did not qualify
- Stats at Basketball Reference

Local media
- Television: VTV; CTV Sportsnet Pacific
- Radio: CKST

The 1999–2000 Vancouver Grizzlies season was the fifth season for the Vancouver Grizzlies in the National Basketball Association.

== Season summary ==
=== Off-season ===
After finishing the lockout season with the worst record, the Grizzlies received the second overall pick in the 1999 NBA draft, and selected point guard Steve Francis from the University of Maryland. However, Francis refused to play for the Canadian team, and was later on traded to the Houston Rockets in exchange for second-year guard Michael Dickerson, Othella Harrington, Brent Price and Antoine Carr; Dickerson would reunite with his former University of Arizona teammate, second-year star Mike Bibby. During the off-season, the Grizzlies signed free agents Grant Long, and three-point specialist Dennis Scott.

=== Regular season ===
With the addition of Dickerson, Harrington, Long and Scott, the Grizzlies got off to a 3–3 start to the regular season, but continued to struggle posting an 11-game losing streak between November and December afterwards. Head coach Brian Hill was fired after a 4–18 start to the season, and was replaced with assistant coach Lionel Hollins as an interim coach. Under Hollins, the Grizzlies posted a six-game losing streak in January, and later on held a 14–34 record at the All-Star break. The team suffered a 12-game losing streak between February and March, losing 14 of their 15 games in March, and posted a seven-game losing streak in April. The Grizzlies finished in last place in the Midwest Division with a 22–60 record; it was the first time that the franchise had won 20 or more games during the regular season, as the team missed the NBA playoffs for the fifth consecutive year.

Shareef Abdur-Rahim averaged 20.3 points and 10.1 rebounds per game, while Dickerson averaged 18.2 points and 1.4 steals per game, and also led the Grizzlies with 119 three-point field goals, and Bibby provided the team with 14.5 points, 8.1 assists and 1.6 steals per game. In addition, Harrington contributed 13.1 points and 6.9 rebounds per game, and Bryant Reeves provided with 8.9 points and 5.7 rebounds per game. Off the bench, Scott contributed 5.6 points per game, while Long provided with 4.8 points and 5.6 rebounds per game, but only played just 42 games due to a hand injury.

During the NBA All-Star weekend at The Arena in Oakland in Oakland, California, Dickerson and Bibby were both selected for the NBA Rookie Challenge Game, as members of the Sophomores team, while Bibby also participated in the NBA Three-Point Shootout. Dickerson also finished tied in eighth place in Most Improved Player voting. Francis, now with the Rockets, was named the co-NBA Rookie of the Year along with Elton Brand of the Chicago Bulls.

The Grizzlies finished 27th in the NBA in home-game attendance, with an attendance of 569,864 at General Motors Place during the regular season, which was the third-lowest in the league.

=== Aftermath ===
Following the season, Scott was traded along with second-year guard Felipe López, and Cherokee Parks to the Washington Wizards, but was released to free agency, while Carr retired, and Hollins was fired as head coach.

== Offseason ==
=== Draft ===
The Grizzlies originally had three picks entering the Draft. Steve Francis was the 2nd overall pick in the 1999 NBA draft from the University of Maryland. Francis most notably cried after being chosen by Vancouver, swearing the Chicago Bulls would regret selecting Elton Brand first overall instead.

Following Vancouver's draft, Francis publicly announced that he did not want to play for the Grizzlies, citing the distance from his Maryland home, taxes, endorsements, and God's will. Francis was heavily criticized for his antics, especially in Vancouver. Following his public outburst, Francis was traded to the Houston Rockets that summer in a three-team, 11-player deal that brought Michael Dickerson, Othella Harrington, Antoine Carr, Brent Price, plus first- and second-round picks to the Grizzlies. He and Brand shared Rookie of the Year honors.

Obinna Ekezie from the University of Maryland was their second pick. Their final pick in the draft was Antwain Smith from the Saint Paul's College.

Round	Pick	Player	Position	Nationality	College
1	2	Steve Francis	PG	United States	Maryland
2	37	Obinna Ekezie	C/PF	Nigeria	Maryland
2	51	Antwain Smith	SF	United States	Saint Paul's College

== Roster ==
1999–2000 Vancouver Grizzlies roster
Players

Pos.	No.	Player	Height	Weight	DOB	From
F	3	Shareef Abdur-Rahim	6 ft 9 in (2.06 m)	225 lb (102 kg)	––	California
G	10	Mike Bibby	6 ft 2 in (1.88 m)	195 lb (88 kg)	––	Arizona
F/C	55	Antoine Carr	6 ft 9 in (2.06 m)	225 lb (102 kg)	––	Wichita State
G	8	Michael Dickerson	6 ft 5 in (1.96 m)	190 lb (86 kg)	––	Arizona
F/C	54	Obinna Ekezie	6 ft 9 in (2.06 m)	270 lb (122 kg)	––	Maryland
F/C	24	Othella Harrington	6 ft 9 in (2.06 m)	235 lb (107 kg)	––	Georgetown
F	43	Grant Long (injured)	6 ft 8 in (2.03 m)	225 lb (102 kg)	––	Eastern Michigan
G	13	Felipe López	6 ft 5 in (1.96 m)	215 lb (98 kg)	––	St. John's
G	5	Milt Palacio	6 ft 3 in (1.91 m)	195 lb (88 kg)	––	Colorado State
C	1	Cherokee Parks	6 ft 11 in (2.11 m)	235 lb (107 kg)	––	Duke
G	20	Brent Price (injured)	6 ft 1 in (1.85 m)	165 lb (75 kg)	––	Oklahoma
C	50	Bryant Reeves	7 ft 0 in (2.13 m)	290 lb (132 kg)	––	Oklahoma State
F	9	Dennis Scott	6 ft 8 in (2.03 m)	229 lb (104 kg)	––	Georgia Tech
G/F	2	Doug West	6 ft 6 in (1.98 m)	200 lb (91 kg)	––	Villanova

Coaches
Head coach
- Lionel Hollins
Assistant(s)
- Jim Boylan
- Lawrence Frank
- Jack Nolan

Legend
- (DP) Unsigned draft pick
- (FA) Free agent
- (S) Suspended
- Injured

Roster

=== Roster notes ===
- Rookie point guard Milt Palacio also holds American citizenship.

== Regular season ==
=== Season standings ===
Midwest Division	W	L	PCT	GB	Home	Road	Div
y-Utah Jazz	55	27	.671	–	31–10	24–17	14–10
x-San Antonio Spurs	53	29	.646	2	31–10	22–19	16–8
x-Minnesota Timberwolves	50	32	.610	5	26–15	24–17	18–6
Dallas Mavericks	40	42	.488	15	22–19	18–23	12–12
Denver Nuggets	35	47	.427	20	25–16	10–31	10–14
Houston Rockets	34	48	.415	21	22–19	12–29	8–16
Vancouver Grizzlies	22	60	.268	33	12–29	10–31	6–18

#	Western Conference				
#	Team	W	L	PCT	GB
1	z-Los Angeles Lakers	67	15	.817	–
2	y-Utah Jazz	55	27	.671	12
3	x-Portland Trail Blazers	59	23	.720	8
4	x-San Antonio Spurs	53	29	.646	14
5	x-Phoenix Suns	53	29	.646	14
6	x-Minnesota Timberwolves	50	32	.610	17
7	x-Seattle SuperSonics	45	37	.549	22
8	x-Sacramento Kings	44	38	.537	23
9	Dallas Mavericks	40	42	.488	27
10	Denver Nuggets	35	47	.427	32
11	Houston Rockets	34	48	.415	33
12	Vancouver Grizzlies	22	60	.268	45
13	Golden State Warriors	19	63	.232	48
14	Los Angeles Clippers	15	67	.183	52

=== Game log ===
#	Date	Opponent	Score	Record	Attendance
1	November 2	Portland Trail Blazers	86–106	0–1	18,218
2	November 3	@ Los Angeles Lakers	88–103	0–2	18,997
3	November 6	Denver Nuggets	109–94	1–2	12,159
4	November 10	Atlanta Hawks	102–97 (OT)	2–2	11,453
5	November 12	Golden State Warriors	93–103	2–3	12,792
6	November 14	Los Angeles Clippers	109–89	3–3	12,774
7	November 16	@ Sacramento Kings	77–81	3–4	14,169
8	November 18	Seattle SuperSonics	108–110	3–5	12,275
9	November 21	Minnesota Timberwolves	81–105	3–6	12,493
10	November 23	@ Washington Wizards	87–89	3–7	11,219
11	November 24	@ Charlotte Hornets	73–89	3–8	16,003
12	November 26	@ Indiana Pacers	86–105	3–9	18,345
13	November 27	@ Minnesota Timberwolves	82–113	3–10	16,881
14	November 29	Houston Rockets	110–118 (OT)	3–11	15,086
15	December 1	Indiana Pacers	89–96	3–12	11,683
16	December 3	Charlotte Hornets	94–113	3–13	12,107
17	December 6	@ Houston Rockets	99–102	3–14	14,458
18	December 7	@ Dallas Mavericks	104–95	4–14	11,552
19	December 9	@ San Antonio Spurs	91–99	4–15	14,778
20	December 11	Los Angeles Lakers	94–106	4–16	14,059
21	December 13	@ Los Angeles Clippers	90–102	4–17	9,303
22	December 15	Sacramento Kings	106–109	4–18	12,490
23	December 18	@ Seattle SuperSonics	89–112	4–19	14,094
24	December 19	Los Angeles Clippers	85–84	5–19	12,584
25	December 23	Denver Nuggets	93–91	6–19	11,792
26	December 26	@ Denver Nuggets	86–109	6–20	17,074
27	December 27	Philadelphia 76ers	93–100	6–21	13,269
28	December 29	@ Utah Jazz	90–101	6–22	19,911
29	December 30	San Antonio Spurs	88–98	6–23	14,403
30	January 4	@ Miami Heat	91–87	7–23	19,035
31	January 5	@ Orlando Magic	96–116	7–24	12,904
32	January 7	@ New Jersey Nets	101–91	8–24	14,246
33	January 9	@ Toronto Raptors	107–97	9–24	19,188
34	January 10	@ Boston Celtics	112–103	10–24	14,876
35	January 12	Phoenix Suns	92–95	10–25	14,404
36	January 14	Cleveland Cavaliers	80–82	10–26	13,161
37	January 16	Miami Heat	83–94	10–27	15,456
38	January 20	Utah Jazz	89–94	10–28	12,909
39	January 22	Orlando Magic	82–85	10–29	11,817
40	January 24	@ Denver Nuggets	98–110	10–30	10,884
41	January 26	@ Utah Jazz	116–99	11–30	19,080
42	January 27	New Jersey Nets	108–106	12–30	11,934
43	January 31	Milwaukee Bucks	87–92	12–31	12,398
44	February 2	@ Golden State Warriors	95–101	12–32	10,019
45	February 4	Chicago Bulls	101–76	13–32	15,357
46	February 6	Dallas Mavericks	99–103 (OT)	13–33	14,861
47	February 8	@ Phoenix Suns	76–94	13–34	18,385
48	February 10	@ Los Angeles Clippers	112–90	14–34	9,895
49	February 16	Washington Wizards	92–87	15–34	12,894
50	February 18	@ Minnesota Timberwolves	91–103	15–35	17,101
51	February 19	@ Milwaukee Bucks	111–100	16–35	17,109
52	February 21	@ Cleveland Cavaliers	108–109 (OT)	16–36	12,140
53	February 22	@ Chicago Bulls	85–81	17–36	21,874
54	February 24	Boston Celtics	77–111	17–37	13,001
55	February 26	Sacramento Kings	102–90	18–37	17,856
56	February 29	@ Sacramento Kings	87–112	18–38	17,317
57	March 1	@ Los Angeles Lakers	91–103	18–39	18,912
58	March 3	@ Portland Trail Blazers	91–101	18–40	20,367
59	March 5	Toronto Raptors	92–94	18–41	19,193
60	March 7	@ New York Knicks	86–111	18–42	19,763
61	March 8	@ Philadelphia 76ers	90–107	18–43	20,086
62	March 10	@ Detroit Pistons	97–111	18–44	22,076
63	March 11	@ Atlanta Hawks	86–91	18–45	13,344
64	March 13	Seattle SuperSonics	103–113	18–46	14,510
65	March 16	@ Seattle SuperSonics	103–117	18–47	13,070
66	March 17	Phoenix Suns	86–101	18–48	14,255
67	March 19	Detroit Pistons	99–101	18–49	15,240
68	March 21	Golden State Warriors	98–82	19–49	13,555
69	March 25	Utah Jazz	75–84	19–50	14,143
70	March 29	Los Angeles Lakers	99–108	19–51	16,780
71	March 31	New York Knicks	83–89	19–52	16,632
72	April 2	Dallas Mavericks	86–100	19–53	12,941
73	April 4	Houston Rockets	102–100	20–53	12,742
74	April 6	Portland Trail Blazers	89–87	21–53	12,234
75	April 8	@ Portland Trail Blazers	85–98	21–54	20,415
76	April 9	San Antonio Spurs	99–107	21–55	14,206
77	April 11	@ Golden State Warriors	97–109	21–56	10,127
78	April 12	@ Phoenix Suns	116–122 (OT)	21–57	18,463
79	April 14	Minnesota Timberwolves	94–104 (2OT)	21–58	17,748
80	April 16	@ Dallas Mavericks	106–114	21–59	13,947
81	April 18	@ San Antonio Spurs	93–100	21–60	19,913
82	April 19	@ Houston Rockets	96–92	22–60	16,285

== Player statistics ==
=== Ragular season ===
Player	POS	GP	GS	MP	REB	AST	STL	BLK	PTS	MPG	RPG	APG	SPG	BPG	PPG
Shareef Abdur-Rahim	SF	82	82	3,223	825	271	89	87	1,663	39.3	10.1	3.3	1.1	1.1	20.3
Mike Bibby	PG	82	82	3,155	306	665	132	15	1,190	38.5	3.7	8.1	1.6	.2	14.5
Michael Dickerson	SG	82	82	3,103	279	208	116	45	1,496	37.8	3.4	2.5	1.4	.5	18.2
Othella Harrington	PF	82	82	2,677	563	97	36	58	1,076	32.6	6.9	1.2	.4	.7	13.1
Bryant Reeves	C	69	67	1,773	390	82	33	38	611	25.7	5.7	1.2	.5	.6	8.9
Dennis Scott	SF	66	0	1,263	106	69	28	9	369	19.1	1.6	1.0	.4	.1	5.6
Felipe López	SG	65	0	781	124	44	32	17	292	12.0	1.9	.7	.5	.3	4.5
Cherokee Parks	C	56	14	808	183	35	29	45	168	14.4	3.3	.6	.5	.8	3.0
Milt Palacio	PG	53	0	394	51	48	20	0	108	7.4	1.0	.9	.4	.0	2.0
Grant Long	PF	42	1	920	234	43	45	10	203	21.9	5.6	1.0	1.1	.2	4.8
Brent Price	PG	41	0	424	37	69	17	1	141	10.3	.9	1.7	.4	.0	3.4
Obinna Ekezie	PF	39	0	351	92	8	9	4	125	9.0	2.4	.2	.2	.1	3.2
Doug West	SG	38	0	581	71	43	12	8	152	15.3	1.9	1.1	.3	.2	4.0
Antoine Carr	SF	21	0	221	32	7	3	6	67	10.5	1.5	.3	.1	.3	3.2
Joe Stephens	SF	13	0	181	36	11	7	3	41	13.9	2.8	.8	.5	.2	3.2
