= 1999–2000 Seattle SuperSonics season =

NBA professional basketball team season

- Head coach: Paul Westphal
- General manager: Wally Walker
- Owner: Barry Ackerley
- Arena: KeyArena

Results
- Record: 45–37 (.549)
- Place: Division: 4th (Pacific); Conference: 7th (Western)
- Playoff finish: First round (lost to Jazz 2–3)
- Stats at Basketball Reference

Local media
- Television: KSTW; Fox Sports Net Northwest
- Radio: KJR

The 1999–2000 Seattle SuperSonics season was the 33rd season for the Seattle SuperSonics in the National Basketball Association.

== Season summary ==
=== Off-season ===
The SuperSonics received the 13th overall pick in the 1999 NBA draft, and selected shooting guard Corey Maggette out of Duke University; however, the team soon traded Maggette to the Orlando Magic in exchange for Horace Grant. During the off-season, the SuperSonics acquired Brent Barry from the Chicago Bulls, and signed free agents Vernon Maxwell, second-year forward Ruben Patterson and three-point specialist Chuck Person.

For the season, the SuperSonics revealed new dark red alternate road uniforms, which featured a dark green and golden yellow trim, and dark green side panels with golden yellow and dark green outlines on the right side of their jerseys and shorts; these uniforms would remain in use until 2001.

=== Regular season ===
With the addition of Grant, Barry, Patterson and Maxwell, the SuperSonics won nine of their first eleven games of the regular season, posted a seven-game winning streak in January, and later on held a 31–20 record at the All-Star break. However, the team played below .500 in winning percentage for the remainder of the season, losing five consecutive home games in March. The SuperSonics finished in fourth place in the Pacific Division with a 45–37 record, earning the seventh seed in the Western Conference, and returning to the NBA playoffs after a one-year absence.

Gary Payton averaged 24.2 points, 6.5 rebounds, 8.9 assists and 1.9 steals per game, and led the league with 177 three-point field goals; he was also named to the All-NBA First Team, and to the NBA All-Defensive First Team. In addition, Vin Baker averaged 16.6 points and 7.7 rebounds per game, while Barry contributed 11.8 points, 3.6 assists and 1.3 steals per game, along with 164 three-point field goals, Patterson showed improvement averaging 11.6 points and 5.4 rebounds per game, and Grant provided the team with 8.1 points and 7.8 rebounds per game. Off the bench, Maxwell contributed 10.9 points per game, but only played just 47 games due to a knee injury, and second-year forward Rashard Lewis provided with 8.2 points and 4.1 rebounds per game.

During the NBA All-Star weekend at The Arena in Oakland in Oakland, California, Payton was selected for the 2000 NBA All-Star Game, as a member of the Western Conference All-Star team. Payton also finished in sixth place in Most Valuable Player voting, and tied in fifth place in Defensive Player of the Year voting, and Patterson finished tied in sixth place in Most Improved Player voting, while Lewis finished tied in eleventh place.

The SuperSonics finished 22nd in the NBA in home-game attendance, with an attendance of 615,730 at the KeyArena at Seattle Center during the regular season.

=== NBA playoffs ===
In the Western Conference First Round of the 2000 NBA playoffs, the SuperSonics faced off against the 2nd–seeded, and Midwest Division champion Utah Jazz, who were led by the trio of All-Star forward Karl Malone, All-Star guard John Stockton, and Bryon Russell. The SuperSonics lost the first two games to the Jazz on the road at the Delta Center, but managed to win the next two games at home, which included a Game 4 win over the Jazz at the KeyArena at Seattle Center, 104–93 to even the series. However, the SuperSonics lost Game 5 to the Jazz at the Delta Center, 96–93, thus losing in a hard-fought five-game series.

=== Aftermath ===
Following the season, Grant was traded to the Los Angeles Lakers in a four-team trade after only one season with the SuperSonics, while Maxwell was traded to the New York Knicks, but was released to free agency, and re-signed as a free agent with his former team, the Philadelphia 76ers, and Person retired.

== Offseason ==
=== Draft picks ===
Round	Pick	Player	Position	Nationality	College
1	13	Corey Maggette	SG/SF	United States	Duke

The 1999 NBA Draft saw the Seattle SuperSonics with the 13th and 41st overall picks, the latter of which was acquired by the Denver Nuggets. With the remaining pick, the Sonics selected Duke University's Corey Maggette, regarded by some as the "best pure athlete in the entire draft."

On draft night, the Sonics traded Maggette to the Orlando Magic, along with veteran players Billy Owens, Don MacLean, and Dale Ellis. In return, the Sonics received veteran forward Horace Grant, a three-time NBA champion with the Michael Jordan-led Chicago Bulls (1991–1993). They also received two future second-round draft picks (No. 42 in 2000 and No. 42 in 2001) in the deal.

== Roster ==
1999–2000 Seattle SuperSonics roster
Players

Pos.	No.	Player	Height	Weight	DOB	From
C	42	Vin Baker	6 ft 11 in (2.11 m)	232 lb (105 kg)	1971–11–23	Hartford
G/F	31	Brent Barry	6 ft 6 in (1.98 m)	185 lb (84 kg)	1971–12–31	Oregon State
F	11	Lazaro Borrell	6 ft 8 in (2.03 m)	220 lb (100 kg)	1972–09–20	No college
G	15	Emanual Davis (injured)	6 ft 4 in (1.93 m)	195 lb (88 kg)	1968–08–27	Delaware State
F/C	44	Greg Foster	6 ft 11 in (2.11 m)	240 lb (109 kg)	1968–10–08	UTEP
F	54	Horace Grant	6 ft 10 in (2.08 m)	215 lb (98 kg)	1965–07–04	Clemson
F	7	Rashard Lewis	6 ft 10 in (2.08 m)	215 lb (98 kg)	1979–08–08	No college
G	3	Vernon Maxwell	6 ft 4 in (1.93 m)	180 lb (82 kg)	1965–09–12	Florida
F/C	34	Jelani McCoy	6 ft 10 in (2.08 m)	245 lb (111 kg)	1977–12–06	UCLA
F	21	Ruben Patterson	6 ft 5 in (1.96 m)	224 lb (102 kg)	1975–07–31	Cincinnati
G	20	Gary Payton	6 ft 4 in (1.93 m)	180 lb (82 kg)	1968–07–23	Oregon State
F	45	Chuck Person	6 ft 8 in (2.03 m)	220 lb (100 kg)	1964–06–27	Auburn
C	5	Vladimir Stepania (injured)	7 ft 0 in (2.13 m)	236 lb (107 kg)	1976–05–08	No college
G	24	Fred Vinson	6 ft 4 in (1.93 m)	190 lb (86 kg)	1971–01–28	Georgia Tech
G	1	Shammond Williams	6 ft 1 in (1.85 m)	201 lb (91 kg)	1975–04–05	North Carolina

Coaches
Head coach
- Paul Westphal
Assistant(s)
- Dwane Casey
- Nate McMillan
- Bob Weiss

Legend
- (DP) Unsigned draft pick
- (FA) Free agent
- (S) Suspended
- Injured

Roster
Updated: February 4, 2000

== Regular season ==
Seattle began the season by winning 9 out of their first 11 games, capping off the run with a win over the Houston Rockets on November 20, 1999. Their strong play continued through the month of January, where a 7-game win streak put them at a season-high 14 games over .500 (27–13). Though the Sonics only managed to win 18 of their final 42 games, their early-season success offset their late-season losses, keeping them safely within the playoff picture.

With two games left in the season, the Sonics overcame the Sacramento Kings in overtime to secure the 7th seed in the Western Conference. This assured that the team would avoid the 1st-seeded Los Angeles Lakers, who finished the season with an NBA-best 67–15, in the first round of the playoffs. Particularly, the seeding eliminated the possibility of unfavorable match-ups with a young Kobe Bryant and season MVP Shaquille O'Neal.

The Sonics would lose their final game of the regular season and finish with a 45–37 record.

=== Season standings ===
Pacific Division	W	L	PCT	GB	Home	Road	Div
y-Los Angeles Lakers	67	15	.817	–	36–5	31–10	20–4
x-Portland Trail Blazers	59	23	.720	8	30–11	29–12	21–3
x-Phoenix Suns	53	29	.646	14	32–9	21–20	15–9
x-Seattle SuperSonics	45	37	.549	22	24–17	21–20	12–12
x-Sacramento Kings	44	38	.537	23	30–11	14–27	9–15
Golden State Warriors	19	63	.232	48	12–29	7–34	2–22
Los Angeles Clippers	15	67	.183	52	10–31	5–36	5–19

#	Western Conference				
#	Team	W	L	PCT	GB
1	z-Los Angeles Lakers	67	15	.817	–
2	y-Utah Jazz	55	27	.671	12
3	x-Portland Trail Blazers	59	23	.720	8
4	x-San Antonio Spurs	53	29	.646	14
5	x-Phoenix Suns	53	29	.646	14
6	x-Minnesota Timberwolves	50	32	.610	17
7	x-Seattle SuperSonics	45	37	.549	22
8	x-Sacramento Kings	44	38	.537	23
9	Dallas Mavericks	40	42	.488	27
10	Denver Nuggets	35	47	.427	32
11	Houston Rockets	34	48	.415	33
12	Vancouver Grizzlies	22	60	.268	45
13	Golden State Warriors	19	63	.232	48
14	Los Angeles Clippers	15	67	.183	52

z – clinched division title
y – clinched division title
x – clinched playoff spot

== Playoffs ==
2000 playoff game log
First Round: 2–3 (home: 2–0; road: 0–3)

Game	Date	Team	Score	High points	High rebounds	High assists	Location Attendance	Series
1	April 22	@ Utah	L 93–104	Gary Payton (24)	Gary Payton (11)	Gary Payton (6)	Delta Center; 19,911	0–1
2	April 24	@ Utah	L 87–101	Gary Payton (20)	Vin Baker (7)	Shammond Williams (10)	Delta Center; 19,911	0–2
3	April 29	Utah	W 89–78	Gary Payton (23)	Vin Baker (11)	Gary Payton (10)	KeyArena; 16,713	1–2
4	May 3	Utah	W 104–93	Gary Payton (35)	Gary Payton (10)	Gary Payton (11)	KeyArena; 16,631	2–2
5	May 5	@ Utah	L 93–96	Gary Payton (27)	three players tied (7)	Gary Payton (9)	Delta Center; 19,911	2–3

2000 schedule

== Player statistics ==
Legend
GP	Games played	GS	Games started	MPG	Minutes per game
FG%	Field-goal percentage	3P%	3-point field-goal percentage	FT%	Free-throw percentage
RPG	Rebounds per game	APG	Assists per game	SPG	Steals per game
BPG	Blocks per game	PPG	Points per game

=== Season ===
Player	GP	GS	MPG	FG%	3P%	FT%	RPG	APG	SPG	BPG	PPG
Vin Baker	79	75	36.1	.455	.250	.682	7.7	1.9	0.6	0.8	16.6
Brent Barry	80	74	34.1	.463	.411	.809	4.7	3.6	1.3	0.4	11.8
Lazaro Borrell	17	6	9.8	.444	.000	.545	2.4	0.6	0.4	0.2	3.6
Emanual Davis	54	2	13.0	.364	.301	.684	1.9	1.3	0.7	0.1	4.0
Greg Foster	60	5	12.0	.406	.200	.643	1.8	0.7	0.2	0.3	3.4
Horace Grant	76	76	35.4	.444	.000	.721	7.8	2.5	0.7	0.8	8.1
Rashard Lewis	82	8	19.2	.486	.333	.683	4.1	0.9	0.8	0.4	8.2
Vernon Maxwell	47	0	21.0	.345	.300	.730	1.7	1.6	0.8	0.2	10.9
Jelani McCoy	58	2	12.9	.576		.495	3.1	0.4	0.3	0.8	4.3
Ruben Patterson	81	74	25.9	.536	.444	.692	5.4	1.6	1.2	0.5	11.6
Gary Payton	82	82	41.8	.448	.340	.735	6.5	8.9	1.9	0.2	24.2
Chuck Person	37	0	9.2	.301	.253	.500	1.4	0.6	0.1	0.1	2.8
Vladimir Stepania	30	1	6.7	.367	.000	.472	1.6	0.1	0.3	0.4	2.5
Fred Vinson	8	0	5.0	.294	.286	.500	0.1	0.0	0.4	0.0	1.6
Shammond Williams	43	5	12.0	.373	.296	.647	1.2	1.8	0.4	0.0	5.2

=== Playoffs ===
Player	GP	GS	MPG	FG%	3P%	FT%	RPG	APG	SPG	BPG	PPG
Vin Baker	5	4	35.4	.400	.000	.588	7.6	2.0	1.0	0.4	14.0
Brent Barry	5	3	31.0	.364	.400	.714	2.6	3.0	0.6	0.6	8.4
Lazaro Borrell	2	1	13.0	.571		.500	5.5	0.5	0.0	0.0	5.0
Greg Foster	5	0	13.6	.368	.400	1.000	2.2	0.2	0.0	0.2	3.6
Horace Grant	5	5	37.0	.407		.500	6.2	2.0	1.6	1.0	4.8
Rashard Lewis	5	5	31.4	.441	.474	.800	6.2	0.6	1.0	0.6	15.4
Jelani McCoy	3	0	8.7	.400		.000	2.0	0.7	0.0	0.0	1.3
Ruben Patterson	5	0	16.8	.538	.000	.867	3.0	0.4	0.6	0.4	8.2
Gary Payton	5	5	44.2	.442	.391	.769	7.6	7.4	1.8	0.2	25.8
Chuck Person	2	0	1.0	.000	.000		0.0	0.0	0.0	0.0	0.0
Shammond Williams	5	2	19.8	.545	.636	.727	2.2	3.6	1.6	0.0	10.2

Player statistics citation:

== Awards and records ==
- Gary Payton, All-NBA First Team
- Gary Payton, NBA All-Defensive First Team
