= 1999–2000 Denver Nuggets season =

NBA professional basketball team season

- Head coach: Dan Issel
- General manager: Dan Issel
- Owner: Donald Sturm
- Arena: Pepsi Center

Results
- Record: 35–47 (.427)
- Place: Division: 5th (Midwest); Conference: 10th (Western)
- Playoff finish: Did not qualify
- Stats at Basketball Reference

Local media
- Television: KTVD; Fox Sports Net Rocky Mountain
- Radio: KKFN

The 1999–2000 Denver Nuggets season was the 24th season for the Denver Nuggets in the National Basketball Association, and their 33rd season as a franchise.

== Season summary ==
=== Off-season ===
For the season, the Nuggets moved into their new arena known as the Pepsi Center. The Nuggets had the 18th overall pick in the 1999 NBA draft, and selected small forward James Posey out of Xavier University. During the off-season, the team acquired Ron Mercer and Popeye Jones from the Boston Celtics, and signed free agent George McCloud. Former Nuggets coach Dan Issel returned as head coach in his second stint with the team.

=== Regular season ===
Under Issel and with the addition of Mercer, McCloud and Posey, the Nuggets played above .500 in winning percentage with a 17–15 record to start the regular season. However, the team soon struggled and fell below .500, posting a six-game losing streak in January afterwards, and holding a 21–27 record at the All-Star break. At mid-season, the Nuggets traded Mercer and Chauncey Billups, who only played just 13 games due to a sprained ankle and a shoulder injury, and Johnny Taylor to the Orlando Magic in exchange for Tariq Abdul-Wahad, and Chris Gatling; however, Billups never played for the Magic, because of his shoulder injury. The team posted a seven-game losing streak in March, as Bryant Stith was out due to a leg injury after 45 games. The Nuggets managed to win their final four games of the season, and finished in fifth place in the Midwest Division with a 35–47 record, missing the NBA playoffs for the fifth consecutive year.

Antonio McDyess averaged 19.1 points, 8.5 rebounds and 1.7 blocks per game, while Nick Van Exel averaged 16.1 points and 9.0 assists per game, and led the Nuggets with 133 three-point field goals, and second-year star Raef LaFrentz provided the team with 12.4 points, 7.9 rebounds and 2.2 blocks per game. In addition, Gatling provided with 10.4 points and 5.1 rebounds per game in 40 games after the trade, while McCloud contributed 10.1 points and 3.2 assists per game, along with 107 three-point field goals off the bench, and Abdul-Wahad contributed 8.9 points per game in 15 games. Meanwhile, second-year center Keon Clark averaged 8.6 points, 6.2 rebounds and 1.4 blocks per game, Posey provided with 8.2 points and 3.9 rebounds per game, and was named to the NBA All-Rookie Second Team, and Stith contributed 5.6 points per game.

During the NBA All-Star weekend at The Arena in Oakland in Oakland, California, LaFrentz and Posey were both selected for the NBA Rookie Challenge Game, as LaFrentz was a member of the Sophomores team, while Posey was a member of the Rookies team. LaFrentz scored 11 points along with 10 rebounds and 3 blocks, despite the Sophomores losing to the Rookies in overtime, 92–83.

The Nuggets finished 18th in the NBA in home-game attendance, with an attendance of 637,698 at the Pepsi Center during the regular season.

=== Aftermath ===
Following the season, Stith and second-round draft pick Chris Herren were both traded to the Boston Celtics, while Gatling was traded back to his former team, the Miami Heat, who then sent him to the Cleveland Cavaliers in a three-team trade, Jones was dealt to the Washington Wizards, and Cory Alexander signed as a free agent with the Orlando Magic.

== Draft picks ==
Round	Pick	Player	Position	Nationality	School/Club team
1	18	James Posey	SF	United States	Xavier (OH)
2	33	Chris Herren	PG	United States	Fresno State
2	41	Francisco Elson	C	Netherlands	California

== Roster ==
1999–2000 Denver Nuggets roster
Players

Pos.	No.	Player	Height	Weight	DOB	From
G	9	Tariq Abdul-Wahad	6 ft 6 in (1.98 m)	223 lb (101 kg)	1974–11–03	San José State
G	7	Cory Alexander	6 ft 1 in (1.85 m)	185 lb (84 kg)	1973–06–22	Virginia
G/F	42	Ryan Bowen	6 ft 7 in (2.01 m)	215 lb (98 kg)	1975–11–20	Iowa
F/C	15	Keon Clark	6 ft 11 in (2.11 m)	220 lb (100 kg)	1975–04–16	UNLV
F/C	32	Chris Gatling	6 ft 10 in (2.08 m)	220 lb (100 kg)	1967–09–03	Old Dominion
G	8	Chris Herren	6 ft 2 in (1.88 m)	197 lb (89 kg)	1975–09–27	Fresno State
F	54	Popeye Jones	6 ft 8 in (2.03 m)	250 lb (113 kg)	1970–06–17	Murray State
C	45	Raef LaFrentz	6 ft 11 in (2.11 m)	240 lb (109 kg)	1976–05–29	Kansas
G/F	21	George McCloud	6 ft 6 in (1.98 m)	205 lb (93 kg)	1967–05–27	Florida State
F	24	Antonio McDyess	6 ft 9 in (2.06 m)	220 lb (100 kg)	1974–09–07	Alabama
G/F	41	James Posey	6 ft 8 in (2.03 m)	215 lb (98 kg)	1977–01–13	Xavier
F/C	25	Roy Rogers	6 ft 10 in (2.08 m)	235 lb (107 kg)	1973–08–19	Alabama
G	23	Bryant Stith	6 ft 5 in (1.96 m)	208 lb (94 kg)	1970–12–10	Virginia
G	31	Nick Van Exel	6 ft 1 in (1.85 m)	170 lb (77 kg)	1971–11–27	Cincinnati

Coaches
Head coach
- Dan Issel
Assistant(s)
- Louie Dampier
- Mike Evans
- Kim Hughes
- John Lucas

Legend
- (DP) Unsigned draft pick
- (FA) Free agent
- (S) Suspended
- Injured

Roster

== Regular season ==
=== Season standings ===
Midwest Division	W	L	PCT	GB	Home	Road	Div
y-Utah Jazz	55	27	.671	–	31–10	24–17	14–10
x-San Antonio Spurs	53	29	.646	2	31–10	22–19	16–8
x-Minnesota Timberwolves	50	32	.610	5	26–15	24–17	18–6
Dallas Mavericks	40	42	.488	15	22–19	18–23	12–12
Denver Nuggets	35	47	.427	20	25–16	10–31	10–14
Houston Rockets	34	48	.415	21	22–19	12–29	8–16
Vancouver Grizzlies	22	60	.268	33	12–29	10–31	6–18

#	Western Conference				
#	Team	W	L	PCT	GB
1	z-Los Angeles Lakers	67	15	.817	–
2	y-Utah Jazz	55	27	.671	12
3	x-Portland Trail Blazers	59	23	.720	8
4	x-San Antonio Spurs	53	29	.646	14
5	x-Phoenix Suns	53	29	.646	14
6	x-Minnesota Timberwolves	50	32	.610	17
7	x-Seattle SuperSonics	45	37	.549	22
8	x-Sacramento Kings	44	38	.537	23
9	Dallas Mavericks	40	42	.488	27
10	Denver Nuggets	35	47	.427	32
11	Houston Rockets	34	48	.415	33
12	Vancouver Grizzlies	22	60	.268	45
13	Golden State Warriors	19	63	.232	48
14	Los Angeles Clippers	15	67	.183	52

z - clinched division title
y - clinched division title
x - clinched playoff spot

== Player statistics ==
Legend
GP	Games played	GS	Games started	MPG	Minutes per game
FG%	Field-goal percentage	3P%	3-point field-goal percentage	FT%	Free-throw percentage
RPG	Rebounds per game	APG	Assists per game	SPG	Steals per game
BPG	Blocks per game	PPG	Points per game

=== Regular season ===
Player	GP	GS	MPG	FG%	3FG%	FT%	RPG	APG	SPG	BPG	PPG
Antonio McDyess	81	81	33.3	.507	.000	.626	8.5	2.0	0.9	1.7	19.1
Ron Mercer	37	37	38.1	.444	.385	.788	4.1	2.8	0.9	0.4	18.3
Nick Van Exel	79	79	37.3	.390	.332	.817	3.9	9.0	0.9	0.1	16.1
Raef LaFrentz	81	80	30.1	.446	.328	.686	7.9	1.2	0.5	2.2	12.4
Chris Gatling	40	0	19.3	.456	.234	.742	5.1	0.8	0.9	0.3	10.4
George McCloud	78	11	27.2	.417	.378	.818	3.7	3.2	0.6	0.3	10.1
Tariq Abdul-Wahad	15	10	24.9	.389	.500	.738	3.5	1.7	0.4	0.8	8.9
Chauncey Billups	13	5	23.5	.337	.171	.841	2.6	3.0	0.8	0.2	8.6
Keon Clark	81	20	22.8	.542	.125	.688	6.2	0.9	0.6	1.4	8.6
James Posey	81	77	25.3	.429	.373	.800	3.9	1.8	1.2	0.4	8.2
Bryant Stith	45	6	15.4	.455	.304	.831	1.9	1.4	0.4	0.3	5.6
Chris Herren	45	1	13.3	.363	.358	.675	1.2	2.5	0.3	0.0	3.1
Cory Alexander	29	2	11.3	.286	.257	.773	1.4	2.0	0.8	0.1	2.8
Popeye Jones	40	1	8.3	.423	.667	.737	2.6	0.5	0.1	0.2	2.6
Ryan Bowen	52	0	11.3	.393	.111	.717	2.2	0.4	0.8	0.3	2.5
Roy Rogers	40	0	8.9	.398	.000	.463	2.0	0.2	0.1	1.0	2.2
Johnny Taylor	1	0	5.0	.000			1.0	0.0	0.0	0.0	0.0

Player statistics citation:

== Awards and records ==
- James Posey, NBA All-Rookie Team 2nd Team
