= 1999–2000 Portland Trail Blazers season =

NBA professional basketball team season

- Head coach: Mike Dunleavy
- General manager: Bob Whitsitt; Mark Warkentien (assistant)
- Owner: Paul Allen
- Arena: Rose Garden Arena

Results
- Record: 59–23 (.720)
- Place: Division: 2nd (Pacific); Conference: 3rd (Western)
- Playoff finish: Conference finals (lost to Lakers 3–4)
- Stats at Basketball Reference

Local media
- Television: KGW; Fox Sports Northwest
- Radio: KEX

The 1999–2000 Portland Trail Blazers season was the 30th season for the Portland Trail Blazers in the National Basketball Association.

== Season summary ==
=== Off-season ===
During the off-season, the Trail Blazers acquired All-Star forward and 6-time NBA champion Scottie Pippen from the Houston Rockets, acquired Steve Smith from the Atlanta Hawks, and signed free agent Detlef Schrempf.

=== Regular season ===
With the addition of Pippen, Smith and Schrempf, the Trail Blazers got off to a fast start by winning 13 of their first 15 games of the regular season, and later on held the league's best record at 38–11 before the All-Star break. The team posted an 11-game winning streak in February, but later on fell out of first place. The Trail Blazers finished with the second-best record in the league with a 59–23 record, which tied them for the second-highest win percentage in franchise history; finishing in second place in the Pacific Division, the Trail Blazers earned the third seed in the Western Conference, and qualified for the NBA playoffs for the 18th consecutive year, and also for the 23rd time in 24 years.

Rasheed Wallace averaged 16.4 points, 7.0 rebounds and 1.3 blocks per game, while Smith finished second on the team in scoring averaging 14.9 points per game, and Pippen averaged 12.5 points, 6.3 rebounds, 5.0 assists and 1.4 steals per game, and was named to the NBA All-Defensive Second Team. In addition, Damon Stoudamire provided the team with 12.5 points and 5.2 assists per game, and Arvydas Sabonis contributed 11.8 points and 7.8 rebounds per game. Off the bench, second-year guard Bonzi Wells contributed 8.8 points per game, while Schrempf averaged 7.5 points and 4.3 rebounds per game, Brian Grant provided with 7.3 points and 5.5 rebounds per game, but only played 63 games due to knee and foot injuries, and Greg Anthony contributed 6.3 points and 2.5 assists per game.

During the NBA All-Star weekend at The Arena in Oakland in Oakland, California, Wallace was selected for the 2000 NBA All-Star Game, as a member of the Western Conference All-Star team; it was his first ever All-Star appearance. Pippen finished tied in eighth place in Defensive Player of the Year voting. The Trail Blazers finished third in the NBA in home-game attendance, with an attendance of 835,078 at the Rose Garden Arena during the regular season.

=== NBA playoffs ===
In the Western Conference First Round of the 2000 NBA playoffs, the Trail Blazers faced off against the 6th–seeded Minnesota Timberwolves, a team that featured All-Star forward Kevin Garnett, Terrell Brandon, and rookie small forward Wally Szczerbiak. The Trail Blazers won the first two games over the Timberwolves at home at the Rose Garden Arena, before losing Game 3 on the road, 94–87 at the Target Center. The Trail Blazers won Game 4 over the Timberwolves on the road, 85–77 to win the series in four games.

In the Western Conference Semi-finals, and for the second consecutive year, the team faced off against the 2nd–seeded, and Midwest Division champion Utah Jazz, who were led by the trio of All-Star forward Karl Malone, All-Star guard John Stockton, and Bryon Russell. Despite the Jazz winning the Midwest Division title with a 55–27 record, the Trail Blazers had home-court advantage in the series. The Trail Blazers won the first three games over the Jazz to take a 3–0 series lead, but then lost Game 4 on the road, 88–85 at the Delta Center. The Trail Blazers won Game 5 over the Jazz at the Rose Garden Arena, 81–79 to win the series in five games.

In the Western Conference Finals, the Trail Blazers then faced off against the top–seeded, and Pacific Division champion Los Angeles Lakers, who were led by the trio of All-Star center, and Most Valuable Player of the Year, Shaquille O'Neal, All-Star guard Kobe Bryant, and Glen Rice. With the series tied at 1–1, the Trail Blazers lost the next two games to the Lakers at home, which included a Game 4 loss at the Rose Garden Arena, 103–91. However, the Trail Blazers came back from a 3–1 series deficit, and won the next two games over the Lakers, including a Game 6 win at home, 103–93 to even the series. In Game 7 at the Staples Center, the Trail Blazers were up by 15 points with ten minutes remaining in fourth quarter; however, the team then suffered a 15–0 run by the Lakers that tied the score, as the Trail Blazers lost the game, 89–84, thus losing in a hard-fought seven-game series.

The Lakers would go on to defeat the Indiana Pacers in six games in the 2000 NBA Finals, winning their twelfth NBA championship.

=== Aftermath ===
Following the season, Grant was traded to the Miami Heat in a three-team trade, and Jermaine O'Neal was dealt to the Indiana Pacers. The Trail Blazers would not win another NBA playoff series again until May 2, 2014, when Damian Lillard hit a three-point shot with 0.9 seconds left to beat the Houston Rockets, 99–98 in Game 6 of the Western Conference First Round of the 2014 NBA playoffs.

The Trail Blazers would not return to the Western Conference Finals again until the 2018–19 season.

== Offseason ==
Although the Trail Blazers did not have any picks in the 1999 NBA draft, they were active during the offseason. On draft day, the Blazers purchased the draft rights to Roberto Bergersen from the Atlanta Hawks. Bergersen would not sign with the team; instead, he signed with the Idaho Stampede of the Continental Basketball Association. On August 2, the Blazers traded Jim Jackson and Isaiah Rider to the Hawks for Ed Gray and Steve Smith. The same day, the Blazers signed veteran forward Detlef Schrempf. Smith would be the starting shooting guard on the "Jail Blazers". Schrempf would finish his career with Portland, retiring in 2001.

On October 2, the Blazers were involved in a seven-player trade with the Houston Rockets. In the trade, the Blazers traded six players—Stacey Augmon, Kelvin Cato, Ed Gray, Carlos Rogers, Brian Shaw, and Walt Williams—for Scottie Pippen. Pippen would be the Blazers' starting small forward until 2003, when he signed with the Chicago Bulls, the team which he spent the majority of his career with. On October 5, the Blazers signed Antonio Harvey, and the following day, they signed Joe Kleine. On October 12, the Rockets waived Augmon, and the Blazers re-signed him on October 18.

== Draft picks ==
The Blazers owned no picks in the 1999 NBA draft.

== Roster ==
1999–2000 Portland Trail Blazers roster
Players

Pos.	No.	Player	Height	Weight	DOB	From
G	50	Greg Anthony	6 ft 1 in (1.85 m)	176 lb (80 kg)	1967–11–15	UNLV
G/F	2	Stacey Augmon	6 ft 8 in (2.03 m)	205 lb (93 kg)	1968–08–01	UNLV
F/C	44	Brian Grant	6 ft 9 in (2.06 m)	254 lb (115 kg)	1972–03–05	Xavier
G	14	Gary Grant	6 ft 3 in (1.91 m)	185 lb (84 kg)	1965–04–21	Michigan
F/C	34	Antonio Harvey	6 ft 11 in (2.11 m)	225 lb (102 kg)	1970–07–06	Pfeiffer
C	35	Joe Kleine	6 ft 11 in (2.11 m)	255 lb (116 kg)	1962–01–04	Arkansas
F/C	5	Jermaine O'Neal	6 ft 11 in (2.11 m)	226 lb (103 kg)	1978–10–13	Eau Claire HS (SC)
F	33	Scottie Pippen	6 ft 8 in (2.03 m)	210 lb (95 kg)	1965–09–25	Central Arkansas
C	11	Arvydas Sabonis	7 ft 3 in (2.21 m)	279 lb (127 kg)	1964–12–19	Lithuania
F	12	Detlef Schrempf	6 ft 10 in (2.08 m)	214 lb (97 kg)	1963–01–21	Washington
G	8	Steve Smith	6 ft 8 in (2.03 m)	200 lb (91 kg)	1969–03–31	Michigan State
G	3	Damon Stoudamire	5 ft 10 in (1.78 m)	171 lb (78 kg)	1973–09–03	Arizona
G/F	31	Jamel Thomas	6 ft 6 in (1.98 m)	215 lb (98 kg)	1976-07-19	Providence
F/C	30	Rasheed Wallace	6 ft 11 in (2.11 m)	225 lb (102 kg)	1974–09–17	North Carolina
G/F	6	Bonzi Wells	6 ft 5 in (1.96 m)	210 lb (95 kg)	1976–09–28	Ball State
C	29	Nikita Morgunov	6 ft 11 in (2.11 m)	251 lb (114 kg)	1975–06–29	Russia

Coaches
Head coach
- Mike Dunleavy
Assistant(s)
- Tony Brown
- Jim Eyen
- Tim Grgurich
- Bill Musselman
- Elston Turner

Legend
- (DP) Unsigned draft pick
- (FA) Free agent
- (S) Suspended
- Injured

Roster

== Regular season ==
=== Season standings ===
Pacific Division	W	L	PCT	GB	Home	Road	Div
y-Los Angeles Lakers	67	15	.817	–	36–5	31–10	20–4
x-Portland Trail Blazers	59	23	.720	8	30–11	29–12	21–3
x-Phoenix Suns	53	29	.646	14	32–9	21–20	15–9
x-Seattle SuperSonics	45	37	.549	22	24–17	21–20	12–12
x-Sacramento Kings	44	38	.537	23	30–11	14–27	9–15
Golden State Warriors	19	63	.232	48	12–29	7–34	2–22
Los Angeles Clippers	15	67	.183	52	10–31	5–36	5–19

#	Western Conference				
#	Team	W	L	PCT	GB
1	z-Los Angeles Lakers	67	15	.817	–
2	y-Utah Jazz	55	27	.671	12
3	x-Portland Trail Blazers	59	23	.720	8
4	x-San Antonio Spurs	53	29	.646	14
5	x-Phoenix Suns	53	29	.646	14
6	x-Minnesota Timberwolves	50	32	.610	17
7	x-Seattle SuperSonics	45	37	.549	22
8	x-Sacramento Kings	44	38	.537	23
9	Dallas Mavericks	40	42	.488	27
10	Denver Nuggets	35	47	.427	32
11	Houston Rockets	34	48	.415	33
12	Vancouver Grizzlies	22	60	.268	45
13	Golden State Warriors	19	63	.232	48
14	Los Angeles Clippers	15	67	.183	52

z – clinched division title
y – clinched division title
x – clinched playoff spot

== Game log ==
=== Regular season ===
1999–2000 game log
Total: 59–23 (home: 30-11; road: 29-12)
November: 13–3 (home: 5–1; road: 8–2)

Game	Date	Team	Score	High points	High rebounds	High assists	Location Attendance	Record
1	November 2	@ Vancouver	W 106–86	Steve Smith (22)	Rasheed Wallace (7)	Stoudamire, Anthony (8)	General Motors Place; 18,218	1–0
2	November 3	L.A. Clippers	W 121–98	Damon Stoudamire (23)	Arvydas Sabonis (13)	Damon Stoudamire (9)	Rose Garden Arena; 20,584	2–0
3	November 5	Denver	W 95–83	Steve Smith (22)	Detlef Schrempf (8)	Damon Stoudamire (7)	Rose Garden Arena; 19,995	3–0
4	November 6	L.A. Lakers	W 97–82	Scottie Pippen (19)	Scottie Pippen (8)	Pippen, Stoudamire (5)	Rose Garden Arena; 20,584	4–0
5	November 9	@ Utah	L 87–92	Steve Smith (26)	Arvydas Sabonis (9)	Scottie Pippen (5)	Delta Center; 19,538	4–1
6	November 12	@ Denver	W 93–78	Rasheed Wallace (19)	Rasheed Wallace (11)	Scottie Pippen (8)	Pepsi Center; 17,512	5–1
7	November 13	Atlanta	W 131–95	Damon Stoudamire (20)	Jermaine O'Neal (10)	Damon Stoudamire (7)	Rose Garden Arena; 20,404	6–1
8	November 16	@ Miami	W 101–96	Rasheed Wallace (22)	Scottie Pippen (13)	Pippen, Stoudamire (5)	Miami Arena; 15,200	7–1
9	November 17	@ Orlando	W 81–79	Rasheed Wallace (13)	Rasheed Wallace (11)	Damon Stoudamire (8)	Orlando Arena; 13,542	8–1
10	November 19	@ Philadelphia	W 97–91	Rasheed Wallace (21)	Arvydas Sabonis (10)	Scottie Pippen (9)	First Union Center; 20,622	9–1
11	November 20	@ Charlotte	W 100–96 (OT)	Greg Anthony (24)	Arvydas Sabonis (8)	Damon Stoudamire (8)	Charlotte Coliseum; 20,688	10–1
12	November 23	@ Cleveland	L 100–103	Detlef Schrempf (22)	Scottie Pippen (11)	Damon Stoudamire (10)	Gund Arena; 13,565	10–2
13	November 24	@ Minnesota	W 88–81	Smith, Stoudamire (18)	Pippen, Sabonis (10)	Damon Stoudamire (9)	Target Center; 16,219	11–2
14	November 26	Houston	W 91–88 (OT)	Scottie Pippen (19)	Rasheed Wallace (10)	Scottie Pippen (7)	Rose Garden Arena; 20,477	12–2
15	November 27	@ L.A. Clippers	W 88–71	Damon Stoudamire (24)	Rasheed Wallace (12)	Scottie Pippen (10)	Staples Center; 14,552	13–2
16	November 29	Indiana	L 91–93	Wallace, Pippen (20)	Rasheed Wallace (11)	Damon Stoudamire (6)	Rose Garden Arena; 20,049	13–3

December : 9–4 (home: 5–2; road: 4–2)

Game	Date	Team	Score	High points	High rebounds	High assists	Location Attendance	Record
17	December 1	Charlotte	W 94–90	Detlef Schrempf (18)	Wallace, Smith, Schrempf (9)	Greg Anthony (7)	Rose Garden Arena; 19,980	14–3
18	December 3	@ L.A. Lakers	L 80–93	Damon Stoudamire (23)	Scottie Pippen (10)	Damon Stoudamire (6)	Staples Center; 18,997	14–4
19	December 5	@ Phoenix	W 92–90	Rasheed Wallace (21)	Arvydas Sabonis (10)	Scottie Pippen (8)	America West Arena; 19,023	15–4
20	December 7	Miami	L 76–86	Greg Anthony (19)	Rasheed Wallace (8)	Greg Anthony (7)	Rose Garden Arena; 20,317	15–5
21	December 9	Minnesota	W 90–86	Rasheed Wallace (23)	Brian Grant (10)	Steve Smith (6)	Rose Garden Arena; 19,980	16–5
22	December 11	@ Sacramento	W 101–96	Pippen, Wallace (24)	Wallace, Sabonis (11)	Damon Stoudamire (11)	ARCO Arena; 17,317	17–5
23	December 16	@ Seattle	W 107–81	Damon Stoudamire (20)	Wallace, B. Grant (9)	Detlef Schrempf (7)	KeyArena; 17,072	18–5
24	December 17	Phoenix	L 102–110	Damon Stoudamire (22)	Scottie Pippen (10)	Scottie Pippen (6)	Rose Garden Arena; 20,584	18–6
25	December 20	@ Denver	L 88–97	Damon Stoudamire (19)	Rasheed Wallace (10)	Damon Stoudamire (5)	Pepsi Center; 15,708	18–7
26	December 21	@ Houston	W 89–79	Steve Smith (22)	Pippen, B. Grant (8)	Scottie Pippen (8)	Compaq Center; 16,285	19–7
27	December 23	Golden State	W 111–91	Rasheed Wallace (20)	Arvydas Sabonis (7)	Stoudamire, Schrempf (7)	Rose Garden Arena; 20,440	20–7
28	December 28	Seattle	W 94–89	Rasheed Wallace (24)	Wallace, Sabonis (8)	Pippen, Stoudamire (6)	Rose Garden Arena; 20,584	21–7
29	December 30	Philadelphia	W 108–90	Rasheed Wallace (23)	Rasheed Wallace (11)	Greg Anthony (7)	Rose Garden Arena; 20,584	22–7

January : 11–3 (home: 6–0; road: 5–3)

Game	Date	Team	Score	High points	High rebounds	High assists	Location Attendance	Record
30	January 3	@ Chicago	W 88–63	Damon Stoudamire (16)	Arvydas Sabonis (8)	Pippen, Anthony (6)	United Center; 22,353	23–7
31	January 4	@ Toronto	W 114–90	Damon Stoudamire (22)	Arvydas Sabonis (10)	Detlef Schrempf (8)	Air Canada Centre; 19,800	24–7
32	January 6	@ Minnesota	L 96–98	Rasheed Wallace (24)	Brian Grant (7)	Scottie Pippen (7)	Target Center; 15,223	24–8
33	January 8	Phoenix	W 96–91	Brian Grant (21)	Brian Grant (11)	Scottie Pippen (9)	Rose Garden Arena; 20,584	25–8
34	January 10	Dallas	W 107–94	Pippen, Stoudamire, Schrempf (17)	Pippen, B. Grant (8)	Smith, Pippen, Stoudamire (6)	Rose Garden Arena; 19,980	26–8
35	January 12	Cleveland	W 95–75	Rasheed Wallace (25)	Wallace, Pippen (9)	Scottie Pippen (8)	Rose Garden Arena; 19,980	27–8
36	January 14	@ Phoenix	W 105–83	Arvydas Sabonis (23)	Arvydas Sabonis (10)	Pippen, Stoudamire (7)	America West Arena; 19,023	28–8
37	January 15	@ Dallas	L 105–113	Scottie Pippen (22)	Scottie Pippen (9)	Smith, Stoudamire (4)	Reunion Arena; 18,148	28–9
38	January 18	@ Houston	L 89–90	Steve Smith (21)	Scottie Pippen (9)	Scottie Pippen (8)	Compaq Center; 16,285	28–10
39	January 19	@ San Antonio	W 105–95	Rasheed Wallace (22)	Sabonis, Pippen (7)	Stoudamire, Schrempf (7)	Alamodome; 20,638	29–10
40	January 22	@ L.A. Lakers	W 95–91	Steve Smith (27)	Rasheed Wallace (12)	Scottie Pippen (7)	Staples Center; 18,997	30–10
41	January 24	New Jersey	W 101–87	Arvydas Sabonis (21)	Arvydas Sabonis (13)	Scottie Pippen (10)	Rose Garden Arena; 19,980	31–10
42	January 27	Utah	W 85–75	Jermaine O'Neal (14)	Brian Grant (12)	Damon Stoudamire (7)	Rose Garden Arena; 20,534	32–10
43	January 29	San Antonio	W 81–67	Steve Smith (15)	Arvydas Sabonis (8)	Pippen, Anthony, (4)	Rose Garden Arena; 20,584	33–10

February : 12–2 (home: 7–1; road: 5–1)

Game	Date	Team	Score	High points	High rebounds	High assists	Location Attendance	Record
44	February 1	Chicago	W 92–81	Brian Grant (19)	Rasheed Wallace (9)	Scottie Pippen (7)	Rose Garden Arena; 20,220	34–10
45	February 3	@ New York	L 88–98	Smith, Wells (18)	Pippen, B. Grant (9)	Damon Stoudamire (5)	Madison Square Garden; 19,763	34–11
46	February 4	@ Atlanta	W 97–90	Steve Smith (21)	Arvydas Sabonis (12)	Damon Stoudamire (6)	Philips Arena; 18,109	35–11
47	February 6	@ Boston	W 100–94	Steve Smith (23)	B. Grant, O'Neal (8)	Damon Stoudamire (7)	FleetCenter; 18,624	36–11
48	February 7	@ Milwaukee	W 115–111	Steve Smith (24)	Brian Grant (7)	Stoudamire, Anthony (6)	Bradley Center; 15,389	37–11
49	February 9	L.A. Clippers	W 107–100	Arvydas Sabonis (23)	Rasheed Wallace (13)	Damon Stoudamire (7)	Rose Garden Arena; 20,310	38–11
50	February 15	@ Golden State	W 92–83	Arvydas Sabonis (21)	Arvydas Sabonis (16)	Damon Stoudamire (5)	The Arena in Oakland; 11,863	39–11
51	February 16	Golden State	W 99–95	Arvydas Sabonis (20)	Arvydas Sabonis (11)	Stoudamire, Sabonis, Wells (4)	Rose Garden Arena; 20,178	40–11
52	February 18	Washington	W 93–85	Arvydas Sabonis (17)	Rasheed Wallace (11)	Smith, Pippen (4)	Rose Garden Arena; 20,467	41–11
53	February 20	@ Sacramento	W 108–103 (OT)	Rasheed Wallace (24)	Arvydas Sabonis (14)	Scottie Pippen (6)	ARCO Arena; 17,317	42–11
54	February 21	Boston	W 105–92	Arvydas Sabonis (19)	Arvydas Sabonis (8)	Scottie Pippen (8)	Rose Garden Arena; 20,453	43–11
55	February 24	Orlando	W 111–92	Damon Stoudamire (30)	Arvydas Sabonis (8)	Pippen, Schrempf, Anthony (5)	Rose Garden Arena; 20,111	44–11
56	February 27	Utah	W 101–92	Sabonis, Wallace (17)	Rasheed Wallace (9)	Damon Stoudamire (9)	Rose Garden Arena; 20,584	45–11
57	February 29	L.A. Lakers	L 87–90	Scottie Pippen (19)	Arvydas Sabonis (11)	Scottie Pippen (4)	Rose Garden Arena; 20,584	45–12

March : 7–7 (home: 3–5; road: 4–2)

Game	Date	Team	Score	High points	High rebounds	High assists	Location Attendance	Record
58	March 3	Vancouver	W 101–91	Steve Smith (19)	Rasheed Wallace (9)	Scottie Pippen (7)	Rose Garden Arena; 20,367	46–12
59	March 6	Toronto	L 90–109	Rasheed Wallace (27)	Arvydas Sabonis (11)	Greg Anthony (4)	Rose Garden Arena; 20,516	46–13
60	March 8	@ New Jersey	L 103–115	Rasheed Wallace (19)	Jermaine O'Neal (9)	Stoudamire, Augmon (5)	Continental Airlines Arena; 16,234	46–14
61	March 9	@ Indiana	L 119–127 (OT)	Rasheed Wallace (24)	Wallace, Sabonis (11)	Damon Stoudamire (4)	Conseco Fieldhouse; 18,345	46–15
62	March 11	@ Detroit	W 99–94	Rasheed Wallace (24)	Pippen, Wallace (7)	Pippen, Smith, Schrempf (4)	The Palace of Auburn Hills; 22,076	47–15
63	March 12	@ Washington	W 102–86	Damon Stoudamire (16)	Arvydas Sabonis (13)	Damon Stoudamire (6)	MCI Center; 20,674	48–15
64	March 14	Sacramento	W 96–91	Arvydas Sabonis (20)	Arvydas Sabonis (16)	Pippen, Smith, Stoudamire (4)	Rose Garden Arena; 20,499	49–15
65	March 16	Minnesota	L 92–96	Scottie Pippen (21)	Sabonis, O'Neal (9)	Pippen, Stoudamire (4)	Rose Garden Arena; 20,060	49–16
66	March 18	@ Seattle	W 97–96	Rasheed Wallace (24)	Arvydas Sabonis (11)	Pippen, Stoudamire (6)	KeyArena; 17,072	50–16
67	March 22	Detroit	L 95–104	Wallace, Smith (20)	Rasheed Wallace (9)	Damon Stoudamire (7)	Rose Garden Arena; 20,452	50–17
68	March 24	@ Golden State	W 96–83	Damon Stoudamire (26)	Jermaine O'Neal (10)	Damon Stoudamire (8)	The Arena in Oakland; 15,356	51–17
69	March 26	New York	L 89–93	Wallace, Pippen, Stoudamire (20)	Rasheed Wallace (10)	Damon Stoudamire (8)	Rose Garden Arena; 20,497	51–18
70	March 28	San Antonio	L 85–89	Scottie Pippen (25)	Pippen, Wallace (6)	Pippen, Schrempf (5)	Rose Garden Arena; 20,584	51–19
71	March 30	Dallas	W 96–85	Rasheed Wallace (34)	Rasheed Wallace (9)	Scottie Pippen (8)	Rose Garden Arena; 20,399	52–19

April : 7–4 (home: 4–2; road: 3–2)

Game	Date	Team	Score	High points	High rebounds	High assists	Location Attendance	Record
72	April 1	Milwaukee	W 113–79	Damon Stoudamire (31)	Detlef Schrempf (8)	Damon Stoudamire (6)	Rose Garden Arena; 20,390	53–19
73	April 2	Seattle	W 95–82	Steve Smith (21)	Detlef Schrempf (8)	Damon Stoudamire (6)	Rose Garden Arena; 20,417	54–19
74	April 5	Houston	L 105–118	Steve Smith (24)	Brian Grant (12)	Scottie Pippen (5)	Rose Garden Arena; 20,384	54–20
75	April 6	@ Vancouver	L 87–89	Rasheed Wallace (28)	Scottie Pippen (9)	Damon Stoudamire (6)	General Motors Place; 12,234	54–21
76	April 8	Vancouver	W 98–85	Steve Smith (27)	Rasheed Wallace (8)	Scottie Pippen (6)	Rose Garden Arena; 20,415	55–21
77	April 10	@ Utah	W 90–86	Smith, B. Grant (16)	B. Grant, Wallace (7)	Pippen, Stoudamire (4)	Delta Center; 19,911	56–21
78	April 11	@ Dallas	L 81–92	Rasheed Wallace (13)	Brian Grant (12)	Smith, Pippen, Stoudamire, Augmon, Anthony, Wells (2)	Reunion Arena; 14,005	56–22
79	April 13	@ San Antonio	W 93–77	Rasheed Wallace (27)	Rasheed Wallace (8)	Scottie Pippen (7)	Alamodome; 30,641	57–22
80	April 16	Sacramento	W 102–95	Rasheed Wallace (18)	Rasheed Wallace (9)	Scottie Pippen (9)	Rose Garden Arena; 20,584	58–22
81	April 18	@ L.A. Clippers	W 116–100	Steve Smith (24)	Wallace, Sabonis (8)	Smith, Wallace (5)	Staples Center; 18,964	59–22
82	April 19	Denver	L 95–96	Bonzi Wells (18)	Jermaine O'Neal (11)	Greg Anthony (5)	Rose Garden Arena; 20,403	59–23

1999–00 schedule

=== Playoffs ===
2000 playoff game log
First round: 3–1 (home: 2–0; road: 1–1)

Game	Date	Team	Score	High points	High rebounds	High assists	Location Attendance	Series
1	April 23	Minnesota	W 91–88	Scottie Pippen (28)	Scottie Pippen (9)	Damon Stoudamire (4)	Rose Garden Arena; 19,980	1–0
2	April 26	Minnesota	W 86–82	Scottie Pippen (21)	Pippen, Wallace (7)	Damon Stoudamire (6)	Rose Garden Arena; 20,568	2–0
3	April 30	@ Minnesota	L 87–94	Steve Smith (22)	Brian Grant (7)	Pippen, Stoudamire (6)	Target Center; 19,006	2–1
4	May 2	@ Minnesota	W 85–77	Sabonis, Wallace (15)	Arvydas Sabonis (11)	Scottie Pippen (6)	Target Center; 19,006	3–1

Conference Semi-finals: 4–1 (home: 3–0; road: 1–1)

Game	Date	Team	Score	High points	High rebounds	High assists	Location Attendance	Series
1	May 7	Utah	W 94–75	Scottie Pippen (20)	Arvydas Sabonis (14)	Arvydas Sabonis (4)	Rose Garden Arena; 20,351	1–0
2	May 9	Utah	W 103–85	Steve Smith (19)	Grant, Wallace (8)	three players tied (4)	Rose Garden Arena; 20,463	2–0
3	May 11	@ Utah	W 103–84	Arvydas Sabonis (22)	Arvydas Sabonis (8)	Scottie Pippen (7)	Delta Center; 19,911	3–0
4	May 14	@ Utah	L 85–88	Brian Grant (20)	Brian Grant (13)	Pippen, Stoudamire (4)	Delta Center; 19,627	3–1
5	May 16	Utah	W 81–79	Scottie Pippen (23)	Pippen, Sabonis (9)	Scottie Pippen (8)	Rose Garden Arena; 20,043	4–1

Conference finals: 3–4 (home: 1–2; road: 2–2)

Game	Date	Team	Score	High points	High rebounds	High assists	Location Attendance	Series
1	May 20	@ L.A. Lakers	L 94–109	Scottie Pippen (19)	Scottie Pippen (11)	Scottie Pippen (5)	Staples Center; 18,997	0–1
2	May 22	@ L.A. Lakers	W 106–77	Rasheed Wallace (29)	Rasheed Wallace (12)	Greg Anthony (4)	Staples Center; 18,997	1–1
3	May 26	L.A. Lakers	L 91–93	Stoudamire, Wallace (19)	Scottie Pippen (9)	Scottie Pippen (6)	Rose Garden Arena; 20,135	1–2
4	May 28	L.A. Lakers	L 91–103	Rasheed Wallace (34)	Rasheed Wallace (13)	Damon Stoudamire (5)	Rose Garden Arena; 20,209	1–3
5	May 30	@ L.A. Lakers	W 96–88	Pippen, Wallace (22)	Rasheed Wallace (10)	Detlef Schrempf (6)	Staples Center; 18,997	2–3
6	June 2	L.A. Lakers	W 103–93	Rasheed Wallace (30)	Arvydas Sabonis (11)	Arvydas Sabonis (6)	Rose Garden Arena; 20,340	3–3
7	June 4	@ L.A. Lakers	L 84–89	Rasheed Wallace (30)	Scottie Pippen (10)	three players tied (3)	Staples Center; 18,997	3–4

2000 schedule

== Player statistics ==
Legend
GP	Games played	GS	Games started	MPG	Minutes per game
FG%	Field-goal percentage	3P%	3-point field-goal percentage	FT%	Free-throw percentage
RPG	Rebounds per game	APG	Assists per game	SPG	Steals per game
BPG	Blocks per game	PPG	Points per game

=== Regular season ===
Player	GP	GS	MPG	FG%	3P%	FT%	RPG	APG	SPG	BPG	PPG
Scottie Pippen	82	82	33.5	.451	.327	.717	6.3	5.0	1.4	.5	12.5
Steve Smith	82	81	32.8	.467	.398	.850	3.8	2.5	.9	.4	14.9
Greg Anthony	82	3	18.9	.406	.378	.772	1.6	2.5	.7	.1	6.3
Rasheed Wallace	81	77	35.1	.519	.160	.704	7.0	1.8	1.1	1.3	16.4
Damon Stoudamire	78	78	30.4	.432	.377	.841	3.1	5.2	1.0	.0	12.5
Detlef Schrempf	77	6	21.6	.432	.404	.833	4.3	2.6	.5	.2	7.5
Jermaine O'Neal	70	8	12.3	.486	.000	.582	3.3	.3	.2	.8	3.9
Arvydas Sabonis	66	61	25.6	.505	.368	.843	7.8	1.8	.7	1.2	11.8
Bonzi Wells	66	0	17.6	.492	.377	.682	2.8	1.5	1.0	.2	8.8
Brian Grant	63	14	21.0	.491	.500	.675	5.5	1.0	.5	.4	7.3
Stacey Augmon	59	0	11.7	.474	.000	.673	2.0	.9	.5	.2	3.4
Antonio Harvey	19	0	7.2	.567		.583	1.7	.3	.1	.3	2.2
Joe Kleine	7	0	4.4	.364		1.000	.9	.3	.1	.0	1.6
Gary Grant	3	0	8.0	.429			1.0	.3	.3	.0	4.0

=== Playoffs ===
Player	GP	GS	MPG	FG%	3P%	FT%	RPG	APG	SPG	BPG	PPG
Scottie Pippen	16	16	38.4	.419	.300	.743	7.1	4.3	2.0	.4	14.9
Rasheed Wallace	16	16	37.8	.489	.615	.773	6.4	1.8	.9	1.3	17.9
Steve Smith	16	16	37.8	.486	.547	.885	2.5	2.8	1.2	.3	17.1
Arvydas Sabonis	16	16	30.8	.453	.286	.796	6.7	1.9	.9	.8	11.3
Damon Stoudamire	16	16	27.9	.415	.333	.833	2.6	3.6	.5	.3	8.9
Brian Grant	16	0	20.0	.446		.744	5.8	.5	.4	.4	5.4
Detlef Schrempf	15	0	18.4	.393	.167	.830	3.5	2.0	.3	.0	5.6
Greg Anthony	15	0	14.2	.365	.323	.750	1.1	1.7	.9	.3	4.0
Bonzi Wells	14	0	13.4	.446	.200	.707	2.5	.9	.5	.0	7.5
Jermaine O'Neal	8	0	4.8	.273		.667	.9	.1	.0	.4	1.5
Stacey Augmon	7	0	4.9	.333		.500	.3	.0	.0	.0	1.3
Gary Grant	2	0	4.0	.000		.500	.0	.5	.0	.0	.5

- ^{†} Denotes player spent time with another team in the season. Stats reflect time with the Trail Blazers only.

Player statistics citation:

== Awards and honors ==
- Rasheed Wallace, NBA All-Star
- Scottie Pippen, NBA All-Defensive Second Team
