= Mark Davis (basketball, born 1973) =

American basketball player (born 1973)

Personal information
- Born: April 26, 1973 (age 53) Thibodaux, Louisiana
- Listed height: 6 ft 7 in (2.01 m)
- Listed weight: 210 lb (95 kg)

Career information
- High school: Thibodaux (Thibodaux, Louisiana)
- College: Howard College (1991–1993); Texas Tech (1993–1995)
- NBA draft: 1995: 2nd round, 48th overall pick
- Drafted by: Minnesota Timberwolves
- Playing career: 1995–2009
- Position: Small forward
- Number: 7, 4

Career history
- 1995–1996: Minnesota Timberwolves
- 1996–1998: Philadelphia 76ers
- 1999: Miami Heat
- 1999–2000: La Crosse Bobcats
- 2000: Golden State Warriors
- 2000: Viola Reggio Calabria
- 2001: Dakota Wizards
- 2001–2002: Sioux Falls Skyforce
- 2002: Phoenix Eclipse
- 2002: Sta. Lucia Realtors
- 2003–2004: Hapoel Galil Elyon
- 2004: Maccabi Rishon LeZion
- 2005–2006: Wonju Dongbu Promy
- 2007–2008: Science City Jena
- 2009: Lappeenrannan NMKY

Career NBA statistics
- Points: 1,261 (5.5 ppg)
- Rebounds: 697 (3.0 rpg)
- Assists: 294 (1.3 apg)
- Stats at NBA.com
- Stats at Basketball Reference

Mark Anthony Davis (born April 26, 1973) is an American former professional basketball player who played in the NBA, among other leagues.

== Career ==
Davis, a 6 ft 7 in small forward, attended Howard College in Big Spring, Texas, and Texas Tech University before being selected 19th in the second round (48th overall) by the Minnesota Timberwolves in the 1995 NBA draft. He also spent time with the Philadelphia 76ers, Miami Heat, and Golden State Warriors, amongst others.

=== College ===
- 1991–93 Howard College: 58 games
- 1993–95 Texas Tech Red Raiders: 58 games

=== Professional ===
- 1995–96 Minnesota Timberwolves (National Basketball Association, 2nd round, 48th): 3.3 ppg
- 1996–97 Philadelphia 76ers (NBA): 8.5 ppg
- 1997–98 Philadelphia 76ers: 4.0 ppg
- 1998–99 January '99 signed by La Crosse Bobcats (Continental Basketball Association); signed by Miami Heat (NBA): 4 games, 2.3 ppg
- 1999–2000 Golden State Warriors (NBA): 6.2 ppg; December '99 signed by La Crosse Bobcats (CBA)
- 2000 Golden State Warriors: two ten-day contracts
- 2000–01 Signed with Viola Reggio Calabria (Serie A); then played shortly with Toronto Raptors (NBA)
- 2001–02 Signed with Phoenix Eclipse (American Basketball Association) but saw no playing time; signed with Dakota Wizards (CBA): 4 games; signed with Sioux Falls Skyforce (CBA): 16 games
- 2003–04 Hapoel Galil Elyon (Ligat Winner): 12 games; Maccabi Rishon LeZion (Ligat Winner): 9 games
- 2007 Science City Jena (Basketball Bundesliga): 27 games
- 2009 Lappeenrannan NMKY (Korisliiga)
