= 2Ball =

NBA–WNBA skills competition (1998–2001)

2Ball, known for sponsorship purposes as America Online 2Ball and Sony All-Star 2Ball, was a basketball skills competition contested during NBA All-Star Weekend in 1998, 2000, and 2001. It paired members of National Basketball Association (NBA) and Women's National Basketball Association (WNBA) teams in a one-minute shooting competition in which either player could score from one of seven marked spots on a basketball court. The NBA also promoted 2Ball events for boys and girls aged 9 to 17.

== History ==
2Ball was introduced for the 1998 NBA All-Star Game, replacing the Slam Dunk Contest, after the previous year's Dunk Contest was derided as the worst ever, following over a decade of decline in star power and dunk quality.

Each 2Ball team paired an NBA and a WNBA player from the same city. Players attempted shots from one of seven spots on the floor, labeled from 2 to 8 points, for one minute. Teams received a 10-point bonus if they made a shot from each spot, and they received a 10-point penalty for not attempting at least one shot from each spot.

At the 1998 event, Utah's team drew jeers from competitors for a strategy in which the WNBA's Tammi Reiss rebounded all shots, both for herself and teammate Karl Malone. Although Utah's strategy was derided as sexist, Reiss outshot Malone, and Utah made it to the finals, where they lost to Cynthia Cooper and Clyde Drexler of Houston.

After the 1999 All-Star Game was cancelled due to the 1998–99 NBA lockout, 2Ball returned to All-Star Weekend in 2000, as did the Slam Dunk Contest. The winning team split $25,000, the runners-up split $10,000, and the other six teams each split $2,500. Utah, represented by Jeff Hornacek and Natalie Williams, won the 2000 contest, with Hornacek making seven consecutive 7-point shots.

Sacramento won the third and final 2Ball contest in 2001, with Peja Stojakovic and Ruthie Bolton-Holifield splitting the $25,000 prize money.

== Reception ==
Jackie MacMullan said in 1998 that NBA players opposed the replacement of the Slam Dunk Contest with 2Ball, and opposed an NBA event being used to promote the then-new WNBA. MacMullan said that some players proposed boycotting 2Ball in protest.

2Ball is mainly remembered as being introduced to replace the Slam Dunk Contest. Vince Carter's performance at the 2000 Slam Dunk Contest is credited with reviving the event.

== Youth competition ==
Starting in 1994, the NBA ran a boys and girls shooting competition with the same format, also called 2Ball. The program debuted in England in 1996, and was also played in Denmark, France, Germany, Italy, Spain, and Sweden. In the U.S., in 1999, the NBA contracted with Nickelodeon to broadcast programming related to 2Ball youth programs, hosted by Summer Sanders. U.S. competitions were sponsored by local NBA teams and by McDonald's.

== Video game ==
Splash screen of NBA 2Ball video game

At All-Star Weekend in 1998, a PlayStation demo called NBA 2Ball was given away to some attendees. It was based on NBA Jam Extreme, which had been released in October 1996. Between 500 and 1,000 copies were produced, and as of 2010, only three are known to still exist, though a ROM of the game has been released online and has been made playable on PS1 emulators.
