= 1999–2000 Charlotte Hornets season =

NBA professional basketball team season

- Head coach: Paul Silas
- General manager: Bob Bass
- Owner(s): George Shinn, Ray Wooldridge
- Arena: Charlotte Coliseum

Results
- Record: 49–33 (.598)
- Place: Division: 2nd (Central); Conference: 4th (Eastern)
- Playoff finish: First round (lost to 76ers 1–3)
- Stats at Basketball Reference

Local media
- Television: SportSouth; WJZY
- Radio: WBT

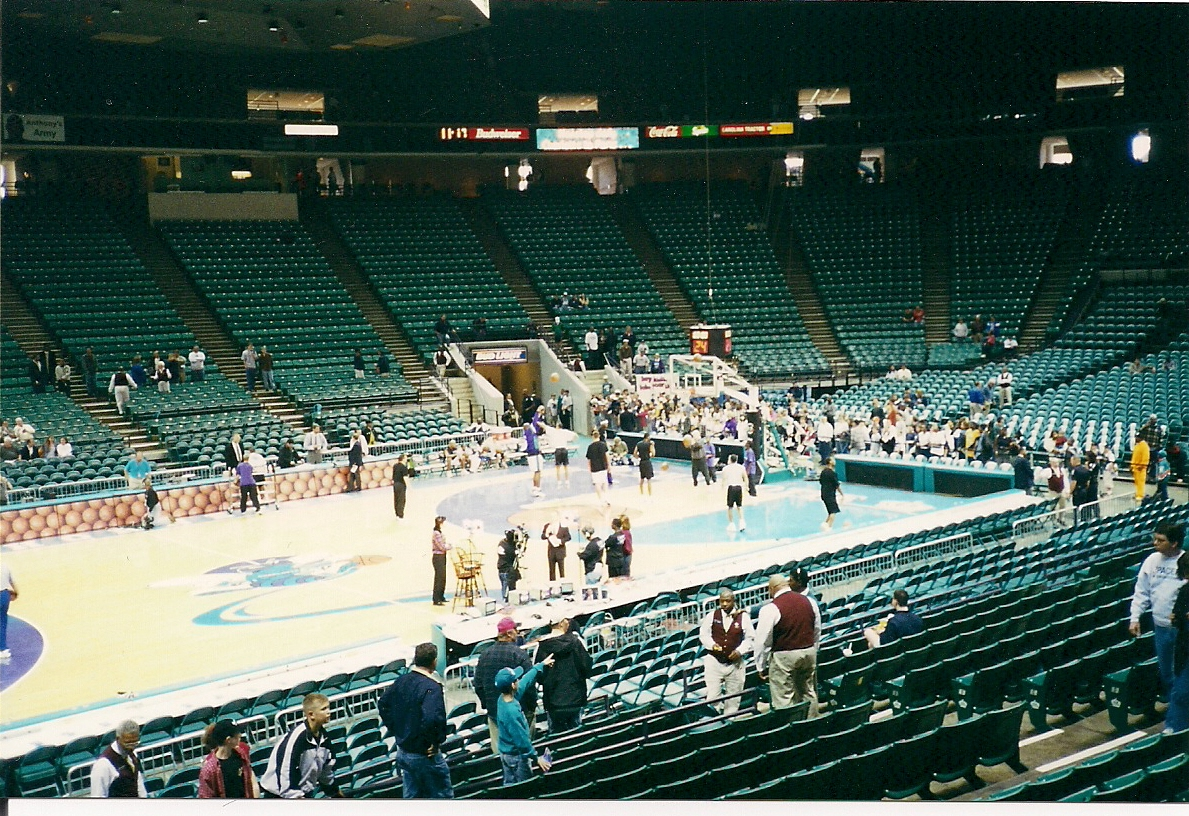
Players warming up prior to an April 2000 game between the Hornets, and the season's eventual Eastern Conference champions Indiana Pacers at the Charlotte Coliseum.

The 1999–2000 Charlotte Hornets season was the 12th season for the Charlotte Hornets in the National Basketball Association.

== Season summary ==
=== Off-season ===
Despite finishing the previous season with a 26–24 record, the Hornets received the third overall pick in the 1999 NBA draft, and selected point guard Baron Davis from the University of California, Los Angeles, and signed undrafted rookie small forward Eddie Robinson during the off-season.

=== Regular season ===
With the addition of Davis and Robinson, the Hornets got off to a solid 16–7 start to the regular season, posting an eight-game winning streak in December.

However, tragedy struck on January 12, 2000, when guard Bobby Phills was killed in a car accident while racing with teammate David Wesley after a team practice; Wesley also had a suspended driver's license at the time. The Hornets retired Phills' #13 jersey on February 9, during a home game at the Charlotte Coliseum against his former team, the Cleveland Cavaliers; the team also wore a patch bearing his #13 on their jerseys for the remainder of the season. Phills played a sixth man role off the bench this season, averaging 13.6 points and 1.5 steals per game in 28 games, starting in just nine of them before his death at the age of 30.

Despite the loss of Phills, and a seven-game losing streak between December and January, the Hornets were competitive and held a 27–20 record at the All-Star break. At mid-season, the team acquired Dale Ellis from the Milwaukee Bucks, and re-signed free agent Chucky Brown after a brief stint with the San Antonio Spurs. The Hornets won 14 of their final 16 games of the season, posting two seven-game winning streaks between March and April, finishing in second place in the Central Division with a 49–33 record, and earning the fourth seed in the Eastern Conference; the team qualified for their fifth NBA playoff appearance.

Eddie Jones averaged 20.1 points, 4.2 assists and 2.7 steals per game, led the Hornets with 128 three-point field goals, and was named to the All-NBA Third Team, and to the NBA All-Defensive Second Team, while Derrick Coleman averaged 16.7 points, 8.5 rebounds and 1.8 blocks per game, and Wesley provided the team with 13.6 points and 5.6 assists per game. In addition, Elden Campbell provided with 12.7 points, 7.6 rebounds and 1.9 blocks per game, while Anthony Mason contributed 11.6 points, 8.5 rebounds and 4.5 assists per game. Off the bench, second-year center Brad Miller averaged 7.7 points and 5.3 rebounds per game, while Robinson contributed 7.0 points per game, Baron Davis provided with 5.9 points, 3.8 assists and 1.2 steals per game, and Brown contributed 4.4 points per game in 33 games.

During the NBA All-Star weekend at The Arena in Oakland in Oakland, California, Jones was selected for the 2000 NBA All-Star Game, as a member of the Eastern Conference All-Star team; it was his third and final All-Star appearance. Meanwhile, second-year guard Ricky Davis participated in the NBA Slam Dunk Contest. Jones also finished tied in third place in Defensive Player of the Year voting, while Mason finished tied in eighth place; Coleman finished tied in eleventh place in Most Improved Player voting, and head coach Paul Silas finished in third place in Coach of the Year voting.

The Hornets finished eleventh in the NBA in home-game attendance, with an attendance of 732,827 at the Charlotte Coliseum during the regular season; this was the first time during their history in Charlotte that the team did not finish in the top ten in home-game attendance.

=== NBA playoffs ===
In the Eastern Conference First Round of the 2000 NBA playoffs, the Hornets faced off against the 5th–seeded Philadelphia 76ers, a team that featured All-Star guard Allen Iverson, Tyrone Hill, and defensive shot-blocker Theo Ratliff. Despite both teams finishing with the same regular-season record, the Hornets had home-court advantage in the series. The Hornets lost Game 1 to the 76ers at home, 92–82 at the Charlotte Coliseum, but managed to win Game 2 at home in overtime, 108–98 to even the series. However, the Hornets lost the next two games on the road, which included a Game 4 loss to the 76ers at the First Union Center, 105–99, thus losing the series in four games.

=== Aftermath ===
Following the season, Jones, Mason and Ricky Davis were all traded to the Miami Heat, while Miller signed as a free agent with the Chicago Bulls, and Brown was released to free agency. Ellis, who was involved in a trade with the Heat, was released and then retired.

== Offseason ==
=== NBA draft ===
Round	Pick	Player	Position	Nationality	College
1	3	Baron Davis	PG	United States	UCLA
2	43	Lee Nailon	SF/PF	United States	Texas Christian

== Roster ==
1999–2000 Charlotte Hornets roster
Players

Pos.	No.	Player	Height	Weight	DOB	From
F	52	Chucky Brown	6 ft 7 in (2.01 m)	214 lb (97 kg)	1968–02–29	NC State
C	5	Elden Campbell	6 ft 11 in (2.11 m)	215 lb (98 kg)	1968–07–23	Clemson
F/C	44	Derrick Coleman	6 ft 10 in (2.08 m)	230 lb (104 kg)	1967–06–21	Syracuse
G	1	Baron Davis	6 ft 3 in (1.91 m)	209 lb (95 kg)	1979–04–13	UCLA
G/F	21	Ricky Davis	6 ft 6 in (1.98 m)	195 lb (88 kg)	1979–09–23	Iowa
G/F	2	Dale Ellis	6 ft 7 in (2.01 m)	205 lb (93 kg)	1960–08–06	Tennessee
C	52	Todd Fuller	6 ft 11 in (2.11 m)	255 lb (116 kg)	1974–07–25	NC State
G	7	Michael Hawkins	6 ft 0 in (1.83 m)	178 lb (81 kg)	1972–10–28	Xavier
G	6	Eddie Jones	6 ft 6 in (1.98 m)	190 lb (86 kg)	1971–10–20	Temple
F	14	Anthony Mason	6 ft 7 in (2.01 m)	250 lb (113 kg)	1966–12–14	Tennessee State
C	40	Brad Miller	6 ft 11 in (2.11 m)	244 lb (111 kg)	1976–04–12	Purdue
G	3	Eldridge Recasner	6 ft 3 in (1.91 m)	190 lb (86 kg)	1967–12–14	Washington
G/F	32	Eddie Robinson	6 ft 8 in (2.03 m)	210 lb (95 kg)	1976–04–19	Central Oklahoma
G	4	David Wesley	6 ft 0 in (1.83 m)	190 lb (86 kg)	1970–11–14	Baylor

Coaches
Head coach
- Paul Silas
Assistant(s)
- Jeff Bower
- Jerry Eaves
- Mark Osowski
- Lee Rose

Legend
- (DP) Unsigned draft pick
- (FA) Free agent
- (S) Suspended
- Injured

Roster
Updated: February 8, 2000

=== Roster notes ===
- Shooting guard Bobby Phills died in a car accident on January 12, 2000.

== Regular season ==
=== Season standings ===
Central Division	W	L	PCT	GB	Home	Road	Div
y-Indiana Pacers	56	26	.683	–	36–5	20–21	20–8
x-Charlotte Hornets	49	33	.598	7	30–11	19–22	20–8
x-Toronto Raptors	45	37	.549	11	26–15	19–22	16–12
x-Detroit Pistons	42	40	.512	14	27–14	15–26	16–12
x-Milwaukee Bucks	42	40	.512	14	23–18	19–22	16–12
Cleveland Cavaliers	32	50	.390	24	22–19	10–31	8–20
Atlanta Hawks	28	54	.341	28	21–20	7–34	11–17
Chicago Bulls	17	65	.207	39	12–29	5–36	5–23

#	Eastern Conference				
#	Team	W	L	PCT	GB
1	c-Indiana Pacers	56	26	.683	–
2	y-Miami Heat	52	30	.634	4
3	x-New York Knicks	50	32	.610	6
4	x-Charlotte Hornets	49	33	.598	7
5	x-Philadelphia 76ers	49	33	.598	7
6	x-Toronto Raptors	45	37	.549	11
7	x-Detroit Pistons	42	40	.512	14
8	x-Milwaukee Bucks	42	40	.512	14
9	Orlando Magic	41	41	.500	15
10	Boston Celtics	35	47	.427	21
11	Cleveland Cavaliers	32	50	.390	24
12	New Jersey Nets	31	51	.378	25
13	Washington Wizards	29	53	.354	27
14	Atlanta Hawks	28	54	.341	28
15	Chicago Bulls	17	65	.207	39

=== Game log ===
1999–2000 game log
Total: 49–33 (home: 30–11; road: 19–22)
November: 8–6 (home: 7–1; road: 1–5)

Game	Date	Team	Score	High points	High rebounds	High assists	Location Attendance	Record
1	November 2	Orlando	W 100–86	Eddie Jones (24)	Elden Campbell (9)	David Wesley (9)	Charlotte Coliseum; 17,461	1–0
2	November 4	Indiana	W 98–89	Eddie Jones (22)	Anthony Mason (10)	David Wesley (7)	Charlotte Coliseum; 15,762	2–0
3	November 5	@ Boston	L 100–103	David Wesley (17)	Anthony Mason (8)	David Wesley (7)	FleetCenter; 16,582	2–1
4	November 7	@ Toronto	L 99–109	Eddie Jones (26)	Mason, Campbell (10)	David Wesley (5)	Air Canada Centre; 16,658	2–2
5	November 10	Milwaukee	W 117–111	Eddie Jones (33)	Anthony Mason (8)	David Wesley (10)	Charlotte Coliseum; 15,769	3–2
6	November 12	New Jersey	W 96–92	Eddie Jones (24)	Elden Campbell (11)	David Wesley (11)	Charlotte Coliseum; 16,668	4–2
7	November 13	@ San Antonio	L 79–95	Phills, Coleman (13)	Campbell, Mason (10)	David Wesley (8)	Alamodome; 19,669	4–3
8	November 16	@ Atlanta	L 98–103	Mason, Jones (20)	Anthony Mason (16)	David Wesley (6)	Philips Arena; 11,426	4–4
9	November 17	Dallas	W 104–99	Eddie Jones (24)	Derrick Coleman (18)	Eddie Jones (9)	Charlotte Coliseum; 15,137	5–4
10	November 19	@ Orlando	W 103–92	Eddie Jones (30)	Anthony Mason (15)	Anthony Mason (8)	Orlando Arena; 12,936	6–4
11	November 20	Portland	L 96–100 (OT)	Elden Campbell (24)	Elden Campbell (11)	David Wesley (9)	Charlotte Coliseum; 20,688	6–5
12	November 24	Vancouver	W 89–73	Eddie Jones (14)	Anthony Mason (10)	David Wesley (8)	Charlotte Coliseum; 16,003	7–5
13	November 26	Washington	W 118–85	Elden Campbell (19)	Brad Miller (10)	David Wesley (10)	Charlotte Coliseum; 18,542	8–5
14	November 27	@ Cleveland	L 89–106	Eddie Jones (22)	Anthony Mason (13)	Baron Davis (4)	Gund Arena; 15,194	8–6

December: 10–5 (home: 6–1; road: 4–4)

Game	Date	Team	Score	High points	High rebounds	High assists	Location Attendance	Record
15	December 1	@ Portland	L 90–94	Elden Campbell (19)	Elden Campbell (11)	David Wesley (11)	Rose Garden; 19,980	8–7
16	December 3	@ Vancouver	W 113–94	David Wesley (28)	Anthony Mason (6)	Eddie Jones (12)	General Motors Place; 12,107	9–7
17	December 5	@ Seattle	W 103–81	Derrick Coleman (26)	Derrick Coleman (11)	David Wesley (9)	KeyArena; 12,233	10–7
18	December 8	Golden State	W 113–106	Eddie Jones (30)	Anthony Mason (15)	Eddie Jones (10)	Charlotte Coliseum; 15,327	11–7
19	December 10	Denver	W 106–99	Anthony Mason (21)	Anthony Mason (12)	Mason, Wesley (8)	Charlotte Coliseum; 17,320	12–7
20	December 11	@ Philadelphia	W 106–84	Brad Miller (19)	Brad Miller (12)	David Wesley (13)	First Union Center; 18,078	13–7
21	December 15	Minnesota	W 103–98	Derrick Coleman (20)	Anthony Mason (13)	Mason, Jones (8)	Charlotte Coliseum; 16,303	14–7
22	December 17	Cleveland	W 99–86	Eddie Jones (17)	Anthony Mason (13)	Mason, Jones, Wesley; Phills, B. Davis (5)	Charlotte Coliseum; 16,586	15–7
23	December 18	@ Miami	W 106–89	Eddie Jones (24)	Derrick Coleman (10)	Baron Davis (8)	Miami Arena; 14,621	16–7
24	December 20	@ New York	L 109–112 (OT)	Eddie Jones (23)	Anthony Mason (13)	David Wesley (7)	Madison Square Garden; 19,763	16–8
25	December 23	Orlando	L 106–110	Derrick Coleman (20)	Mason, Coleman, Miller (9)	Baron Davis (9)	Charlotte Coliseum; 16,918	16–9
26	December 26	@ Detroit	L 96–114	Anthony Mason (28)	Coleman, Mason, Campbell (6)	David Wesley (9)	The Palace of Auburn Hills; 15,339	16–10
27	December 27	Atlanta	W 108–104	Derrick Coleman (25)	Derrick Coleman (16)	David Wesley (12)	Charlotte Coliseum; 17,114	17–10
28	December 29	Milwaukee	W 109–105	Derrick Coleman (27)	Elden Campbell (11)	Anthony Mason (7)	Charlotte Coliseum; 17,134	18–10
29	December 30	@ Indiana	L 99–109	David Wesley (17)	Campbell, B. Davis, R. Davis (6)	Baron Davis (8)	Conseco Fieldhouse; 18,345	18–11

January: 6–7 (home: 5–1; road: 1–6)

Game	Date	Team	Score	High points	High rebounds	High assists	Location Attendance	Record
30	January 4	@ Phoenix	L 80–86	Wesley, Campbell (18)	Derrick Coleman (19)	David Wesley (5)	America West Arena; 18,640	18–12
31	January 5	@ Utah	L 96–118	David Wesley (19)	Campbell, Miller (6)	David Wesley (5)	Delta Center; 19,518	18–13
32	January 7	@ L.A. Lakers	L 83–87	Coleman, Wesley (17)	Elden Campbell (13)	Baron Davis (5)	Staples Center; 18,997	18–14
33	January 8	@ Denver	L 92–97	Derrick Coleman (21)	Derrick Coleman (14)	Baron Davis (6)	Pepsi Center; 18,408	18–15
34	January 10	@ Milwaukee	L 87–137	David Wesley (23)	Brad Miller (8)	Elden Campbell (5)	Bradley Center; 13,159	18–16
—	January 12	Chicago	Postponed due to the Death of Bobby Phills. Makeup date March 5.					
—	January 14	New York	Postponed due to the Death of Bobby Phills. Makeup date February 7.					
35	January 15	@ New York	L 79–91	Eddie Jones (23)	Derrick Coleman (13)	David Wesley (9)	Madison Square Garden; 19,763	18–17
36	January 17	Toronto	W 115–94	Eddie Jones (25)	Derrick Coleman (11)	David Wesley (9)	Charlotte Coliseum; 20,278	19–17
37	January 19	@ Chicago	W 96–86	Eddie Jones (26)	Derrick Coleman (13)	David Wesley (11)	United Center; 21,906	20–17
38	January 20	Philadelphia	W 109–100	Jones, Coleman (23)	Anthony Mason (9)	Eddie Jones (8)	Charlotte Coliseum; 16,160	21–17
39	January 22	Boston	W 110–96	Derrick Coleman (24)	Mason, Coleman (11)	Mason, Wesley (8)	Charlotte Coliseum; 18,900	22–17
40	January 25	Sacramento	L 99–110	Derrick Coleman (24)	Elden Campbell (11)	Eddie Jones (9)	Charlotte Coliseum; 17,370	22–18
41	January 27	Detroit	W 117–102	Eddie Jones (25)	Brad Miller (9)	Derrick Coleman (8)	Charlotte Coliseum; 16,238	23–18
42	January 29	Phoenix	W 100–79	Eddie Jones (20)	Brad Miller (12)	Eddie Jones (6)	Charlotte Coliseum; 19,366	24–18

February: 7–7 (home: 4–4; road: 3–3)

Game	Date	Team	Score	High points	High rebounds	High assists	Location Attendance	Record
43	February 1	@ Houston	L 83–99	Eddie Jones (20)	Derrick Coleman (11)	Baron Davis (5)	Compaq Center; 14,391	24–19
44	February 3	@ Dallas	L 96–106	Eddie Jones (21)	Elden Campbell (10)	Mason, Davis (5)	Reunion Arena; 11,126	24–20
45	February 5	@ Washington	W 110–102	Elden Campbell (27)	Derrick Coleman (10)	Anthony Mason (5)	MCI Center; 18,422	25–20
46	February 7	New York	W 95–85	Eddie Jones (34)	Derrick Coleman (13)	David Wesley (8)	Charlotte Coliseum; 18,128	26–20
47	February 9	Cleveland	W 103–95	Eddie Jones (32)	Elden Campbell (10)	Jones, Wesley (5)	Charlotte Coliseum; 16,512	27–20
48	February 15	@ Philadelphia	W 95–93	Eddie Jones (27)	Mason, Campbell (12)	David Wesley (7)	First Union Center; 18,488	28–20
49	February 16	L.A. Lakers	L 85–92	Derrick Coleman (19)	Elden Campbell (13)	David Wesley (8)	Charlotte Coliseum; 23,799	28–21
50	February 18	L.A. Clippers	W 115–87	Derrick Coleman (17)	Elden Campbell (12)	Baron Davis (7)	Charlotte Coliseum; 18,796	29–21
51	February 20	Miami	L 80–85	Eddie Jones (18)	Derrick Coleman (12)	Anthony Mason (7)	Charlotte Coliseum; 21,539	29–22
52	February 22	Houston	W 102–97	Derrick Coleman (32)	Derrick Coleman (12)	Anthony Mason (11)	Charlotte Coliseum; 15,921	30–22
53	February 24	San Antonio	L 70–72	Derrick Coleman (19)	Derrick Coleman (20)	Anthony Mason (6)	Charlotte Coliseum; 18,535	30–23
54	February 26	@ New Jersey	L 93–104	Derrick Coleman (24)	Derrick Coleman (10)	David Wesley (7)	Continental Airlines Arena; 18,481	30–24
55	February 28	Seattle	L 81–84	Eddie Jones (23)	Anthony Mason (13)	David Wesley (9)	Charlotte Coliseum; 15,902	30–25
56	February 29	@ Minnesota	W 92–87	Elden Campbell (22)	Mason, Campbell (8)	Eddie Jones (5)	Target Center; 15,922	31–25

March: 9–6 (home: 4–3; road: 5–3)

Game	Date	Team	Score	High points	High rebounds	High assists	Location Attendance	Record
57	March 2	@ Orlando	L 96–104	Elden Campbell (22)	Anthony Mason (13)	Mason, Davis (5)	Orlando Arena; 12,382	31–26
58	March 3	Utah	L 87–89	Eddie Jones (31)	Elden Campbell (11)	Eddie Jones (7)	Charlotte Coliseum; 21,148	31–27
59	March 5	Chicago	W 100–94	Derrick Coleman (26)	Mason, Coleman (7)	David Wesley (11)	Charlotte Coliseum; 15,799	32–27
60	March 7	@ Golden State	W 102–99	Derrick Coleman (34)	Derrick Coleman (17)	Eddie Jones (7)	The Arena in Oakland; 10,201	33–27
61	March 8	@ Sacramento	L 92–105	David Wesley (21)	Elden Campbell (13)	David Wesley (6)	ARCO Arena; 17,317	33–28
62	March 10	@ L.A. Clippers	W 118–101	Derrick Coleman (31)	Campbell, Coleman (12)	Baron Davis (7)	Staples Center; 15,362	34–28
63	March 15	Chicago	W 77–74	Wesley, Jones (18)	Elden Campbell (20)	Eddie Jones (8)	Charlotte Coliseum; 15,964	35–28
64	March 17	New York	L 99–118	David Wesley (24)	Elden Campbell (10)	Baron Davis (7)	Charlotte Coliseum; 23,799	35–29
65	March 18	@ Indiana	L 99–113	Derrick Coleman (28)	Mason, Coleman (10)	Eddie Jones (4)	Conseco Fieldhouse; 18,345	35–30
66	March 20	Philadelphia	L 96–102	Eddie Jones (28)	Anthony Mason (11)	David Wesley (10)	Charlotte Coliseum; 16,281	35–31
67	March 22	New Jersey	W 119–103	Eddie Jones (26)	Mason, Campbell, Robinson (7)	Jones, Mason, Wesley (7)	Charlotte Coliseum; 15,595	36–31
68	March 24	@ Toronto	W 102–84	Eddie Jones (25)	Derrick Coleman (12)	Anthony Mason (6)	Air Canada Centre; 19,800	37–31
69	March 25	@ Atlanta	W 86–70	Eddie Jones (24)	Mason, Fuller (15)	Anthony Mason (11)	Philips Arena; 14,609	38–31
70	March 29	@ Detroit	W 98–91	Anthony Mason (22)	Elden Campbell (13)	Anthony Mason (8)	The Palace of Auburn Hills; 14,997	39–31
71	March 31	Toronto	W 110–101 (OT)	Eddie Jones (32)	Anthony Mason (14)	Anthony Mason (11)	Charlotte Coliseum; 23,799	40–31

April: 9–2 (home: 4–1; road: 5–1)

Game	Date	Team	Score	High points	High rebounds	High assists	Location Attendance	Record
72	April 1	@ Chicago	W 90–87	Elden Campbell (25)	Mason, Campbell (9)	Anthony Mason (7)	United Center; 21,882	41–31
73	April 4	Boston	W 112–105	Anthony Mason (27)	Derrick Coleman (14)	David Wesley (9)	Charlotte Coliseum; 16,305	42–31
74	April 6	@ Miami	L 70–76	Anthony Mason (14)	Anthony Mason (15)	Coleman, Wesley (3)	American Airlines Arena; 15,803	42–32
75	April 7	Detroit	L 82–97	Baron Davis (14)	Mason, Coleman (10)	Derrick Coleman (5)	Charlotte Coliseum; 20,002	42–33
76	April 9	Indiana	W 96–80	Cambell, Jones, Coleman (19)	Elden Campbell (13)	Mason, Jones (5)	Charlotte Coliseum; 19,312	43–33
77	April 10	@ Washington	W 107–105	Eddie Jones (26)	Derrick Coleman (16)	Anthony Mason (9)	MCI Center; 12,071	44–33
78	April 12	Atlanta	W 119–87	David Wesley (29)	Brad Miller (8)	Anthony Mason (10)	Charlotte Coliseum; 15,809	45–33
79	April 14	@ Milwaukee	W 109–106 (OT)	Eddie Jones (29)	Derrick Coleman (12)	Coleman, Mason (6)	Bradley Center; 15,839	46–33
80	April 16	@ Boston	W 105–102	Eddie Jones (25)	Anthony Mason (12)	Baron Davis (5)	FleetCenter; 17,278	47–33
81	April 18	@ Cleveland	W 103–88	David Wesley (23)	Mason, Coleman (11)	Mason, Jones, Wesley, Campbell (5)	Gund Arena; 14,481	48–33
82	April 19	Miami	W 83–73	Mason, Jones (14)	Elden Campbell (8)	Baron Davis (7)	Charlotte Coliseum; 18,838	49–33

1999–00 schedule

== Playoffs ==
2000 playoff game log
First Round: 1–3 (home: 1–1; road: 0–2)

Game	Date	Team	Score	High points	High rebounds	High assists	Location Attendance	Series
1	April 22	Philadelphia	L 82–92	Derrick Coleman (23)	Derrick Coleman (16)	David Wesley (4)	Charlotte Coliseum; 15,023	0–1
2	April 24	Philadelphia	W 108–98 (OT)	Derrick Coleman (29)	Elden Campbell (14)	Eddie Jones (8)	Charlotte Coliseum; 11,686	1–1
3	April 28	@ Philadelphia	L 76–81	Eddie Jones (18)	Derrick Coleman (17)	Anthony Mason (7)	First Union Center; 20,849	1–2
4	May 1	@ Philadelphia	L 99–105	Campbell, Mason (21)	Campbell, Coleman (11)	Matt Geiger (10)	First Union Center; 20,712	1–3

2000 schedule

== Player statistics ==
=== Regular season ===
Player	POS	GP	GS	MP	REB	AST	STL	BLK	PTS	MPG	RPG	APG	SPG	BPG	PPG
David Wesley	PG	82	82	2,760	225	463	109	11	1,116	33.7	2.7	5.6	1.3	.1	13.6
Anthony Mason	SF	82	81	3,133	699	367	74	29	948	38.2	8.5	4.5	.9	.4	11.6
Baron Davis	PG	82	0	1,523	165	309	97	19	486	18.6	2.0	3.8	1.2	.2	5.9
Elden Campbell	C	78	77	2,538	590	129	56	150	987	32.5	7.6	1.7	.7	1.9	12.7
Derrick Coleman	PF	74	64	2,347	632	175	34	130	1,239	31.7	8.5	2.4	.5	1.8	16.7
Eddie Jones	SG	72	72	2,807	343	305	192	49	1,446	39.0	4.8	4.2	2.7	.7	20.1
Eddie Robinson	SF	67	8	1,112	184	32	48	25	471	16.6	2.7	.5	.7	.4	7.0
Brad Miller	C	55	4	961	293	45	23	35	423	17.5	5.3	.8	.4	.6	7.7
Ricky Davis	SG	48	4	570	83	62	30	8	227	11.9	1.7	1.3	.6	.2	4.7
Todd Fuller	C	41	2	399	110	5	9	8	134	9.7	2.7	.1	.2	.2	3.3
Chucky Brown^{†}	PF	33	2	494	90	25	12	8	144	15.0	2.7	.8	.4	.2	4.4
Bobby Phills	SG	28	9	825	71	79	41	8	381	29.5	2.5	2.8	1.5	.3	13.6
Dale Ellis^{†}	SG	24	5	240	22	8	7	0	55	10.0	.9	.3	.3	.0	2.3
Michael Hawkins	PG	12	0	36	7	13	0	0	8	3.0	.6	1.1	.0	.0	.7
Eldridge Recasner	PG	7	0	28	4	5	0	0	7	4.0	.6	.7	.0	.0	1.0
Derek Hood	PF	2	0	4	1	0	0	0	0	2.0	.5	.0	.0	.0	.0
Jason Miskiri	PG	1	0	3	0	1	0	0	0	3.0	.0	1.0	.0	.0	.0

- ^{†} Denotes player spent time with another team in the season. Stats reflect time with the Hornets only.

=== Playoffs ===
Player	POS	GP	GS	MP	REB	AST	STL	BLK	PTS	MPG	RPG	APG	SPG	BPG	PPG
Anthony Mason	SF	4	4	179	39	22	4	0	50	44.8	9.8	5.5	1.0	.0	12.5
Eddie Jones	SG	4	4	171	20	19	10	3	68	42.8	5.0	4.8	2.5	.8	17.0
Derrick Coleman	PF	4	4	169	50	14	3	12	81	42.3	12.5	3.5	.8	3.0	20.3
David Wesley	PG	4	4	152	12	19	8	0	44	38.0	3.0	4.8	2.0	.0	11.0
Elden Campbell	C	4	4	150	33	4	2	4	57	37.5	8.3	1.0	.5	1.0	14.3
Brad Miller	C	4	0	62	13	3	0	3	30	15.5	3.3	.8	.0	.8	7.5
Baron Davis	PG	4	0	57	6	6	4	0	23	14.3	1.5	1.5	1.0	.0	5.8
Eddie Robinson	SF	4	0	45	3	4	2	1	12	11.3	.8	1.0	.5	.3	3.0

== Awards and records ==
- Eddie Jones, All-NBA Third Team
- Eddie Jones, NBA All-Defensive Second Team

== Transactions ==
- August 17, 1999

Signed Eddie Robinson as a free agent.

- August 18, 1999

Signed Todd Fuller as a free agent.

- October 4, 1999

Signed Derek Hood as a free agent.

Signed Jason Miskiri as a free agent.

- November 8, 1999

Waived Jason Miskiri.

- November 9, 1999

Signed Michael Hawkins as a free agent.

- November 23, 1999

Waived Derek Hood.

- January 18, 2000

Traded a 2000 2nd round draft pick (Jason Hart was later selected) and a 2002 2nd round draft pick (Chris Owens was later selected) to the Milwaukee Bucks for Dale Ellis.

- February 8, 2000

Signed Chucky Brown as a free agent.

Player Transactions Citation:
