= 1999–2000 Chicago Bulls season =

Sports season

- Head coach: Tim Floyd
- General manager: Jerry Krause
- Owner: Jerry Reinsdorf
- Arena: United Center

Results
- Record: 17–65 (.207)
- Place: Division: 8th (Central); Conference: 15th (Eastern)
- Playoff finish: Did not qualify
- Stats at Basketball Reference

Local media
- Television: Fox Sports Net Chicago; WGN; WCIU
- Radio: WMVP

The 1999–2000 Chicago Bulls season was the 34th season for the Chicago Bulls in the National Basketball Association.

== Season summary ==
=== Off-season ===
The Bulls won the NBA draft lottery, and selected power forward Elton Brand out of Duke University with the first overall pick in the 1999 NBA draft; the team also selected small forward Ron Artest out of St. John's University with the 16th overall pick. During the off-season, the team acquired Hersey Hawkins from the Seattle SuperSonics, acquired Australian center Chris Anstey from the Dallas Mavericks, signed free agent Fred Hoiberg, and re-signed former Bulls guard B. J. Armstrong, and former Bulls center Will Perdue, who both won three NBA championships from the team's first three-peat in the early 1990s.

=== Regular season ===
Despite the addition of Brand, Artest and Hawkins, the Bulls continued to struggle as the team lost 26 of their first 28 games of the regular season, posting 10 and 11-game losing streaks respectively. As the season progressed, the team signed free agent Chris Carr, who was previously released by the Golden State Warriors, and also signed three-point specialist Matt Maloney. The Bulls held a 10–37 record at the All-Star break. At mid-season, the team traded Toni Kukoč to the Philadelphia 76ers, and acquired John Starks from the Warriors in a three-team trade. However, after just four games with the Bulls, Starks was released to free agency. The Bulls finished in last place in the Central Division with a 17–65 record.

Brand averaged 20.1 points, 10.0 rebounds and 1.6 blocks per game, and was named to the NBA All-Rookie First Team, and was also named the co-NBA Rookie of the Year along with Steve Francis of the Houston Rockets. In addition, Artest averaged 12.0 points and 1.7 steals per game, and was named to the NBA All-Rookie Second Team, while Carr contributed 9.8 points per game in 50 games, Hoiberg provided with 9.0 points and 1.3 steals per game, but only played just 31 games due to a knee injury, and Hawkins contributed 7.9 points per game. Meanwhile, Armstrong averaged 7.4 points and 2.9 assists per game, but only played just 27 games, Randy Brown provided with 6.4 points and 3.4 assists per game, and Maloney contributed 6.4 points per game. On the defensive side, Anstey averaged 6.0 points and 3.8 rebounds per game, while Dickey Simpkins averaged 4.2 points and 5.4 rebounds per game, Perdue provided with 3.5 points and 3.9 rebounds per game, but only shot .351 in field-goal percentage, and rookie power forward, and second-round draft pick Michael Ruffin contributed 2.2 points and 3.5 rebounds per game.

During the NBA All-Star weekend at The Arena in Oakland in Oakland, California, Brand was selected for the NBA Rookie Challenge Game, as a member of the Rookies team. Brand scored 16 points along with 21 rebounds, 4 assists and 3 steals, and was named the Rookie Challenge Game's Most Valuable Player, as the Rookies defeated the Sophomores team in overtime, 92–83. Despite a stellar rookie season, Artest was not selected for the Rookie Challenge Game.

The Bulls led the NBA in home-game attendance, with an attendance of 907,064 at the United Center during the regular season.

=== Aftermath ===
Following the season, Hawkins re-signed as a free agent with his former team, the Charlotte Hornets, while Brown signed with the Boston Celtics, Maloney signed with the Atlanta Hawks, and Carr, Armstrong, Simpkins, Anstey and Perdue were all released to free agency.

== Offseason ==
=== Draft ===
Round	Pick	Player	Position	Nationality	School/Club team
1	1	Elton Brand	PF	United States	Duke
1	16	Ron Artest	SF/SG	United States	St. John's
2	32	Michael Ruffin	PF	United States	Tulsa
2	49	Lari Ketner	C	United States	Massachusetts

== Roster ==
1999–2000 Chicago Bulls roster
Players

Pos.	No.	Player	Height	Weight	DOB	From
C	22	Chris Anstey	7 ft 0 in (2.13 m)	249 lb (113 kg)	1975–01–01	Australia
G	11	B. J. Armstrong	6 ft 2 in (1.88 m)	175 lb (79 kg)	1967–09–09	Iowa
G/F	15	Ron Artest (injured)	6 ft 6 in (1.98 m)	260 lb (118 kg)	1979–11–13	St. John's
G/F	25	Corey Benjamin (injured)	6 ft 6 in (1.98 m)	200 lb (91 kg)	1978–02–24	Oregon State
F/C	42	Elton Brand	6 ft 8 in (2.03 m)	275 lb (125 kg)	1979–03–11	Duke
G	1	Randy Brown	6 ft 2 in (1.88 m)	190 lb (86 kg)	1968–05–22	New Mexico State
G/F	43	Chris Carr	6 ft 5 in (1.96 m)	207 lb (94 kg)	1974–03–12	Southern Illinois
G	3	Hersey Hawkins	6 ft 3 in (1.91 m)	190 lb (86 kg)	1966–09–29	Bradley
G/F	20	Fred Hoiberg	6 ft 4 in (1.93 m)	203 lb (92 kg)	1972–10–15	Iowa State
G	12	Matt Maloney	6 ft 3 in (1.91 m)	192 lb (87 kg)	1971–12–06	Penn
C	32	Will Perdue	7 ft 0 in (2.13 m)	240 lb (109 kg)	1965–08–29	Vanderbilt
F	51	Michael Ruffin	6 ft 9 in (2.06 m)	246 lb (112 kg)	1971–01–21	Tulsa
F/C	8	Dickey Simpkins	6 ft 9 in (2.06 m)	248 lb (112 kg)	1972–04–06	Providence

Coaches
Head coach
- Tim Floyd
Assistant(s)
- Bill Berry
- Bill Cartwright
- Phil Johnson
- Fred Tedeschi (trainer)

Legend
- (DP) Unsigned draft pick
- (FA) Free agent
- (S) Suspended
- Injured

Roster
Updated: February 18, 2000

=== Roster notes ===
- Point guard Khalid Reeves was waived on January 4, 2000.
- Shooting guard John Starks was waived on March 21, 2000.

== Regular season ==
=== Season standings ===
Central Division	W	L	PCT	GB	Home	Road	Div
y-Indiana Pacers	56	26	.683	–	36–5	20–21	20–8
x-Charlotte Hornets	49	33	.598	7	30–11	19–22	20–8
x-Toronto Raptors	45	37	.549	11	26–15	19–22	16–12
x-Detroit Pistons	42	40	.512	14	27–14	15–26	16–12
x-Milwaukee Bucks	42	40	.512	14	23–18	19–22	16–12
Cleveland Cavaliers	32	50	.390	24	22–19	10–31	8–20
Atlanta Hawks	28	54	.341	28	21–20	7–34	11–17
Chicago Bulls	17	65	.207	39	12–29	5–36	5–23

#	Eastern Conference				
#	Team	W	L	PCT	GB
1	c-Indiana Pacers	56	26	.683	–
2	y-Miami Heat	52	30	.634	4
3	x-New York Knicks	50	32	.610	6
4	x-Charlotte Hornets	49	33	.598	7
5	x-Philadelphia 76ers	49	33	.598	7
6	x-Toronto Raptors	45	37	.549	11
7	x-Detroit Pistons	42	40	.512	14
8	x-Milwaukee Bucks	42	40	.512	14
9	Orlando Magic	41	41	.500	15
10	Boston Celtics	35	47	.427	21
11	Cleveland Cavaliers	32	50	.390	24
12	New Jersey Nets	31	51	.378	25
13	Washington Wizards	29	53	.354	27
14	Atlanta Hawks	28	54	.341	28
15	Chicago Bulls	17	65	.207	39

== Player statistics ==
=== Regular season ===
Player	GP	GS	MPG	FG%	3P%	FT%	RPG	APG	SPG	BPG	PPG
Elton Brand	81	80	37.0	.482	.000	.685	10.0	1.9	0.8	1.6	20.1
Toni Kukoč	24	23	36.2	.381	.231	.761	5.4	5.2	1.8	0.8	18.0
Ron Artest	72	62	31.1	.407	.314	.674	4.3	2.8	1.7	0.5	12.0
Chris Carr	50	2	21.8	.400	.333	.858	3.2	1.6	0.6	0.3	9.8
Rusty LaRue	4	1	32.3	.349	.143	.714	3.5	2.7	1.3	0.1	9.3
Fred Hoiberg	31	11	27.3	.387	.340	.908	3.5	2.7	1.3	0.1	9.0
Hersey Hawkins	61	49	26.6	.424	.390	.899	2.9	2.2	1.2	0.2	7.9
Corey Benjamin	48	10	18.0	.414	.340	.598	1.8	1.1	0.6	0.5	7.7
Dedric Willoughby	25	1	20.3	.341	.296	.765	2.0	2.6	0.9	0.1	7.6
John Starks	4	0	20.5	.324	.300	1.000	2.5	2.8	1.3	0.3	7.5
B. J. Armstrong	27	18	21.6	.446	.448	.880	1.7	2.9	0.3	0.0	7.4
Kornél Dávid	26	5	17.0	.426	.000	.808	2.8	0.6	0.5	0.1	6.5
Randy Brown	59	55	27.5	.361	.500	.738	2.4	3.4	1.0	0.3	6.4
Matt Maloney	51	12	23.0	.358	.356	.822	1.3	2.7	0.6	0.1	6.4
Chris Anstey	73	11	13.8	.442	.167	.789	3.8	0.9	0.4	0.3	6.0
Dickey Simpkins	69	48	23.9	.405	.000	.542	5.4	1.4	0.3	0.3	4.2
Khalid Reeves	3	0	16.0	.250	.000	1.000	1.3	4.3	0.7	0.0	3.7
Will Perdue	67	15	15.1	.351	.000	.476	3.9	1.0	0.2	0.6	3.5
Michael Ruffin	71	6	13.7	.420	.000	.489	3.5	0.6	0.4	0.4	2.2
Lari Kenter	6	0	6.8	.400	.000	1.000	1.2	0.2	0.2	0.2	1.7

Player statistics citation:

== Awards and records ==
- Elton Brand, NBA Rookie of the Year Award (shared with Steve Francis)
- Elton Brand, NBA All-Rookie Team 1st Team
- Ron Artest, NBA All-Rookie Team 2nd Team

== Transactions ==
=== Free agents ===
Additions
Player	Date signed	Former team
Ron Artest	July 15	St. John's (16th pick)
Elton Brand	July 26	Duke (1st overall pick)
Michael Ruffin	August 24	Tulsa (32nd overall pick)
Will Perdue	August 25	San Antonio Spurs
Cory Carr	August 25	Texas Tech (selected 49th in 1998)
Brett Robisch	August 25	unknown
Lari Ketner	August 25	Massachusetts Amherst (49th overall pick)

Player Transactions Citation:
