= 1999–2000 Cleveland Cavaliers season =

NBA professional basketball team season

- Head coach: Randy Wittman
- Arena: Gund Arena

Results
- Record: 32–50 (.390)
- Place: Division: 6th (Central); Conference: 11th (Eastern)
- Playoff finish: Did not qualify
- Stats at Basketball Reference

Local media
- Television: Fox Sports Net Ohio · WUAB
- Radio: WTAM

The 1999–2000 Cleveland Cavaliers season was the 30th season for the Cleveland Cavaliers in the National Basketball Association.

== Season summary ==
=== Off-season ===
The Cavaliers received the eighth overall pick in the 1999 NBA draft from the Boston Celtics via trade, and selected point guard Andre Miller from the University of Utah; the team also selected shooting guard Trajan Langdon out of Duke University with the eleventh overall pick. During the off-season, the Cavaliers acquired Lamond Murray from the Los Angeles Clippers, signed free agent Mark Bryant, and hired Randy Wittman as their new head coach. However, after only playing just five games during the previous season, Zydrunas Ilgauskas would miss the entire regular season due to continuing foot injuries.

For the season, the Cavaliers redesigned their home and road uniforms, removing the controversial light blue splash from across their jerseys and shorts. The white home uniforms featured a light blue, orange and black trim, which was also featured on the right side of their jerseys and shorts, along with the team's primary logo on the right leg of their shorts; the black road uniforms featured a light blue and orange trim. The team's new uniforms would remain in use until 2003.

=== Regular season ===
Under Wittman, and with the addition of Murray, Miller and Bryant, the Cavaliers played around .500 in winning percentage with an 11–9 start to the regular season. However, the team struggled losing ten of their next eleven games, which included a seven-game losing streak in December, and later on held a 19–30 record at the All-Star break. The Cavaliers posted a six-game losing streak in March, and finished in sixth place in the Central Division with a 32–50 record.

Shawn Kemp averaged 17.8 points, 8.8 rebounds and 1.2 blocks per game, but struggled shooting .417 in field-goal percentage, while Murray averaged 15.9 points, 5.7 rebounds and 1.4 steals per game, and Bob Sura provided the team with 13.8 points and 3.9 assists per game, and also led them with 122 three-point field goals. In addition, Miller provided with 11.1 points and 5.8 assists per game, was named to the NBA All-Rookie First Team, while Brevin Knight contributed 9.3 points, 7.0 assists and 1.6 steals per game, and Wesley Person contributed 9.2 points per game and 106 three-point field goals. Meanwhile, Danny Ferry contributed 7.3 points per game, Andrew DeClercq averaged 6.6 points and 5.4 rebounds per game, Bryant provided with 5.7 points and 4.7 rebounds per game, and Cedric Henderson contributed 5.4 points per game.

During the NBA All-Star weekend at The Arena in Oakland in Oakland, California, Sura participated in the NBA Three-Point Shootout, while Miller was selected for the NBA Rookie Challenge Game, as a member of the Rookies team. Miller scored 18 points as the Rookies defeated the Sophomores team in overtime, 92–83. Sura also finished tied in eleventh place in Most Improved Player voting, while Miller finished in fourth place in Rookie of the Year voting.

The Cavaliers finished 24th in the NBA in home-game attendance, with an attendance of 603,702 at the Gund Arena during the regular season.

=== Aftermath ===
Following the season, Kemp was traded to the Portland Trail Blazers in a three-team trade after three seasons with the Cavaliers, while Sura was traded to the Golden State Warriors in another three-team trade, DeClercq was dealt to the Orlando Magic, Bryant was released to free agency, and Ferry signed as a free agent with the San Antonio Spurs.

== Draft picks ==
Round	Pick	Player	Position	Nationality	School/Club team
1	8^{*}	Andre Miller	Guard	United States	Utah
1	11	Trajan Langdon	Guard	United States	Duke
2	39	AJ Bramlett	Center	United States	Arizona

^{*}1st round pick acquired from Boston in Vitaly Potapenko deal.

== Roster ==
1999–2000 Cleveland Cavaliers roster
Players

Pos.	No.	Player	Height	Weight	DOB	From
G	5	Earl Boykins	5 ft 5 in (1.65 m)	133 lb (60 kg)	1976–06–02	Eastern Michigan
F	2	Mark Bryant	6 ft 9 in (2.06 m)	245 lb (111 kg)	1965–04–25	Seton Hall
F/C	55	Andrew DeClercq	6 ft 10 in (2.08 m)	255 lb (116 kg)	1973–02–01	Florida
F/C	35	Danny Ferry	6 ft 10 in (2.08 m)	230 lb (104 kg)	1966–10–17	Duke
F	45	Cedric Henderson	6 ft 7 in (2.01 m)	215 lb (98 kg)	1975–03–11	Memphis
C	11	Zydrunas Ilgauskas (IN)	7 ft 3 in (2.21 m)	238 lb (108 kg)	1975–06–05	Lithuania
C	4	Shawn Kemp	6 ft 10 in (2.08 m)	230 lb (104 kg)	1969–11–26	Trinity Valley CC
F	0	Lari Ketner	6 ft 10 in (2.08 m)	277 lb (126 kg)	1977–02–01	UMass
G	12	Brevin Knight	5 ft 10 in (1.78 m)	170 lb (77 kg)	1975–11–08	Stanford
G	21	Trajan Langdon	6 ft 3 in (1.91 m)	210 lb (95 kg)	1976–05–13	Duke
G	24	Andre Miller	6 ft 2 in (1.88 m)	200 lb (91 kg)	1976–03–19	Utah
F	30	Lamond Murray	6 ft 7 in (2.01 m)	236 lb (107 kg)	1973–04–20	California
G/F	1	Wesley Person	6 ft 6 in (1.98 m)	195 lb (88 kg)	1971–03–28	Auburn
F	10	Ryan Stack	6 ft 11 in (2.11 m)	215 lb (98 kg)	1975–07–24	South Carolina
G	3	Bob Sura	6 ft 5 in (1.96 m)	200 lb (91 kg)	1973–03–25	Florida State

Coaches
Head coach
- Randy Wittman
Assistant(s)
- Bill Blair
- Bob Ociepka
- Mike Woodson

Legend
- (DP) Unsigned draft pick
- (FA) Free agent
- (S) Suspended
- (IN) Inactive
- Injured

Roster
Updated: March 13, 2000

=== Roster Notes ===
- Center Zydrunas Ilgauskas was on the injured reserve list due to a foot injury, and missed the entire regular season.

== Regular season ==
=== Season standings ===
Central Division	W	L	PCT	GB	Home	Road	Div
y-Indiana Pacers	56	26	.683	–	36–5	20–21	20–8
x-Charlotte Hornets	49	33	.598	7	30–11	19–22	20–8
x-Toronto Raptors	45	37	.549	11	26–15	19–22	16–12
x-Detroit Pistons	42	40	.512	14	27–14	15–26	16–12
x-Milwaukee Bucks	42	40	.512	14	23–18	19–22	16–12
Cleveland Cavaliers	32	50	.390	24	22–19	10–31	8–20
Atlanta Hawks	28	54	.341	28	21–20	7–34	11–17
Chicago Bulls	17	65	.207	39	12–29	5–36	5–23

#	Eastern Conference				
#	Team	W	L	PCT	GB
1	c-Indiana Pacers	56	26	.683	–
2	y-Miami Heat	52	30	.634	4
3	x-New York Knicks	50	32	.610	6
4	x-Charlotte Hornets	49	33	.598	7
5	x-Philadelphia 76ers	49	33	.598	7
6	x-Toronto Raptors	45	37	.549	11
7	x-Detroit Pistons	42	40	.512	14
8	x-Milwaukee Bucks	42	40	.512	14
9	Orlando Magic	41	41	.500	15
10	Boston Celtics	35	47	.427	21
11	Cleveland Cavaliers	32	50	.390	24
12	New Jersey Nets	31	51	.378	25
13	Washington Wizards	29	53	.354	27
14	Atlanta Hawks	28	54	.341	28
15	Chicago Bulls	17	65	.207	39

== Game log ==
1999–2000 game log
Total: 32–50 (Home: 22–19; Road: 10–31)
November: 7–6 (home: 6–2; road: 1–4)

Game	Date	Team	Score	High points	High rebounds	High assists	Location Attendance	Record

December: 5–11 (home: 4–5; road: 1–6)

Game	Date	Team	Score	High points	High rebounds	High assists	Location Attendance	Record
19	December 11, 1999	Atlanta	W 127–116				Gund Arena; 11,328	10–9
26	December 23, 1999	@ Atlanta	L 90–108				Philips Arena; 12,528	11–15

January: 6–9 (home: 4–1; road: 2–8)

Game	Date	Team	Score	High points	High rebounds	High assists	Location Attendance	Record

February: 4–8 (home: 4–3; road: 0–5)

Game	Date	Team	Score	High points	High rebounds	High assists	Location Attendance	Record
47	February 5, 2000	Atlanta	L 94–102				Gund Arena; 18,595	19–28

March: 6–9 (home: 1–5; road: 5–4)

Game	Date	Team	Score	High points	High rebounds	High assists	Location Attendance	Record

April: 4–7 (home: 3–3; road: 1–4)

Game	Date	Team	Score	High points	High rebounds	High assists	Location Attendance	Record
80	April 16, 2000	@ Atlanta	L 101–104				Philips Arena; 14,061	31–49

1999–00 schedule

== Player statistics ==
Legend
GP	Games played	GS	Games started	MPG	Minutes per game
FG%	Field-goal percentage	3P%	3-point field-goal percentage	FT%	Free-throw percentage
RPG	Rebounds per game	APG	Assists per game	SPG	Steals per game
BPG	Blocks per game	PPG	Points per game

=== Regular season ===
Player	GP	GS	MPG	FG%	3P%	FT%	RPG	APG	SPG	BPG	PPG
Shawn Kemp	82	82	30.4	41.7	33.3	77.6	8.8	1.7	1.2	1.2	17.8
Lamond Murray	74	72	32.0	45.1	36.7	76.1	5.7	1.8	1.4	0.5	15.9
Bob Sura	73	45	30.4	43.7	36.7	69.7	3.9	3.9	1.2	0.3	13.8
Andre Miller	82	36	25.5	44.9	20.4	77.4	3.4	5.8	1.0	0.2	11.1
Brevin Knight	65	46	27.0	41.2	20.0	76.1	3.0	7.0	1.6	0.3	9.3
Wesley Person	79	38	26.0	42.8	42.4	79.2	3.4	1.8	0.5	0.2	9.2
Danny Ferry	63	3	21.0	49.7	44.0	91.2	3.8	1.1	0.3	0.4	7.3
Andrew DeClercq	82	31	22.3	50.8	0.0	58.8	5.4	0.7	0.8	0.8	6.6
Mark Bryant	75	50	22.8	50.3	0.0	80.9	4.7	0.8	0.4	0.4	5.7
Cedric Henderson	61	7	18.1	39.6	6.7	66.3	2.3	0.9	0.6	0.3	5.4
Earl Boykins	25	0	10.1	47.3	40.0	78.3	1.0	1.8	0.5	0.0	5.3
Trajan Langdon	10	0	14.5	37.5	42.1	100.0	1.5	1.1	0.5	0.0	4.9
Ryan Stack	25	0	7.9	33.3	0.0	66.7	1.8	0.2	0.2	0.4	2.1
Donny Marshall	6	0	6.5	27.3	0.0	83.3	0.2	0.0	0.3	0.0	1.8
Kornel David	6	0	5.2	44.4	0.0	75.0	1.3	0.2	0.7	0.2	1.8
Lari Ketner	16	0	5.7	40.9	0.0	60.0	1.7	0.0	0.2	0.1	1.5
Mark Hendrickson	10	0	4.7	71.4	0.0	100.0	1.1	0.3	0.2	0.1	1.2
A.J. Bramlett	8	0	7.6	19.0	0.0	0.0	2.8	0.0	0.1	0.0	1.0
Benoit Benjamin	3	0	2.7	33.3	0.0	0.0	0.3	0.0	0.0	0.3	0.7
Pete Chilcutt	6	0	5.0	0.0	0.0	0.0	1.5	0.2	0.0	0.0	0.0

Player statistics citation:

== Awards and records ==
- Andre Miller, NBA All-Rookie Team, First Team
