= 1999–2000 Philadelphia 76ers season =

NBA professional basketball team season

- Head coach: Larry Brown
- General manager: Billy King
- Owners: Comcast Spectacor
- Arena: First Union Center

Results
- Record: 49–33 (.598)
- Place: Division: 3rd (Atlantic); Conference: 5th (Eastern)
- Playoff finish: Conference semifinals (lost to Pacers 2–4)
- Stats at Basketball Reference

Local media
- Television: WPSG; Comcast SportsNet Philadelphia
- Radio: WIP

The 1999–2000 Philadelphia 76ers season was the 51st season for the Philadelphia 76ers in the National Basketball Association, and their 37th season in Philadelphia, Pennsylvania.

== Season summary ==
=== Off-season ===
During the off-season, the 76ers acquired Billy Owens from the Orlando Magic, and signed free agent Bruce Bowen. The team also changed their starting lineup, replacing center Matt Geiger with forward Tyrone Hill as the team's starting power forward.

For the season, the 76ers revealed new blue alternate road uniforms, which featured a red, black and bronze trim; these uniforms would remain in use until 2006.

=== Regular season ===
With the addition of Owens, the 76ers lost their first three games of the regular season, and got off to an 11–12 start to the season, as Allen Iverson missed twelve games due to a broken thumb injury. However, Iverson eventually returned as the team played above .500 in winning percentage as the season progressed, holding a 27–22 record at the All-Star break. At mid-season, the team traded Owens, and second-year guard Larry Hughes to the Golden State Warriors, and traded Bowen to the Chicago Bulls in exchange for Toni Kukoč in a three-team trade; however, Bowen never played for the Bulls and was released to free agency, and signed with the Miami Heat. The 76ers posted a seven-game winning streak in March, and won seven of their final nine games of the season, finishing in third place in the Atlantic Division with a 49–33 record, and earning the fifth seed in the Eastern Conference.

Iverson averaged 28.4 points, 4.7 assists and 2.1 steals per game, and was named to the All-NBA Second Team, while Kukoč played a sixth man role off the bench, averaging 12.4 points, 4.5 rebounds and 4.4 assists per game in 32 games after the trade, and Hill provided the team with 12.0 points and 9.2 rebounds per game. In addition, Theo Ratliff averaged 11.9 points, 7.6 rebounds and 3.0 blocks per game, but only played 57 games due to a stress fracture in his left ankle, while George Lynch provided with 9.6 points, 7.8 rebounds and 1.6 steals per game, and Eric Snow contributed 7.9 points, 7.6 assists and 1.7 steals per game. Off the bench, Geiger averaged 9.7 points and 6.0 rebounds per game, and Aaron McKie contributed 8.0 points and 1.3 steals per game.

During the NBA All-Star weekend at The Arena in Oakland in Oakland, California, Iverson was selected for the 2000 NBA All-Star Game, as a member of the Eastern Conference All-Star team; it was his first ever All-Star appearance, as he scored 26 points along with 9 assists and 2 steals, despite the Eastern Conference losing to the Western Conference, 137–126. In addition, Iverson also participated in the NBA Three-Point Shootout, while before the mid-season trade, Hughes participated in the NBA Slam Dunk Contest, and rookie center, and second-round draft pick Todd MacCulloch was selected for the NBA Rookie Challenge Game, as a member of the Rookies team. Iverson also finished in seventh place in Most Valuable Player voting; Shaquille O'Neal of the Los Angeles Lakers won the MVP award almost unanimously, receiving 120 out of 121 first-place votes from the media, while Iverson received one vote from CNN sports broadcaster Fred Hickman, who was the only person who did not vote for O'Neal.

The 76ers finished eighth in the NBA in home-game attendance, with an attendance of 756,956 at the First Union Center during the regular season.

=== NBA playoffs ===
In the Eastern Conference First Round of the 2000 NBA playoffs, the 76ers faced off against the 4th–seeded Charlotte Hornets, who were led by All-Star guard Eddie Jones, former 76ers forward Derrick Coleman, and Anthony Mason. Despite both teams finishing with the same regular-season record, the Hornets had home-court advantage in the series. The 76ers won Game 1 over the Hornets on the road, 92–82 at the Charlotte Coliseum, before losing Game 2 on the road in overtime, 108–98 as the Hornets tied the series at 1–1. The 76ers won the next two games at home, which included a Game 4 win over the Hornets at the First Union Center, 105–99 to win the series in four games.

In the Eastern Conference Semi-finals, and for the second consecutive year, the team faced off against the top–seeded, and Central Division champion Indiana Pacers, who were led by Most Improved Player of the Year, Jalen Rose, All-Star guard Reggie Miller, and All-Star forward Dale Davis. The Pacers took a 3–0 series lead, but the 76ers managed to win the next two games, including a Game 5 win on the road, 107–86 at the Conseco Fieldhouse. However, the 76ers lost Game 6 to the Pacers at home, 106–90 at the First Union Center, thus losing the series in six games.

The Pacers would advance to the NBA Finals for the first time in franchise history, but would lose to the Lakers in six games in the 2000 NBA Finals.

== Offseason ==
=== Draft picks ===
Round	Pick	Player	Position	Nationality	College
2	47	Todd MacCulloch	Center	Canada	University of Washington

== Roster ==
1999–2000 Philadelphia 76ers roster
Players

Pos.	No.	Player	Height	Weight	DOB	From
G	11	Ira Bowman	6 ft 5 in (1.96 m)	195 lb (88 kg)	1973–06–11	Penn
C	52	Matt Geiger	7 ft 0 in (2.13 m)	243 lb (110 kg)	1969–09–10	Georgia Tech
F/C	40	Tyrone Hill	6 ft 9 in (2.06 m)	240 lb (109 kg)	1968–03–19	Xavier
G	3	Allen Iverson	6 ft 0 in (1.83 m)	165 lb (75 kg)	1975–06–07	Georgetown
F	33	Jumaine Jones	6 ft 8 in (2.03 m)	218 lb (99 kg)	1979–02–10	Georgia
F	7	Toni Kukoč	6 ft 10 in (2.08 m)	192 lb (87 kg)	1969–09–18	Croatia
F	41	Antonio Lang	6 ft 8 in (2.03 m)	205 lb (93 kg)	1972–05–15	Duke
F	9	George Lynch	6 ft 8 in (2.03 m)	218 lb (99 kg)	1970–09–03	North Carolina
C	50	Todd MacCulloch	7 ft 0 in (2.13 m)	280 lb (127 kg)	1976–01–27	Washington
G/F	8	Aaron McKie	6 ft 5 in (1.96 m)	209 lb (95 kg)	1972–10–02	Temple
F/C	14	Nazr Mohammed	6 ft 10 in (2.08 m)	221 lb (100 kg)	1977–09–05	Kentucky
G	5	Kevin Ollie	6 ft 4 in (1.93 m)	195 lb (88 kg)	1972–12–27	Connecticut
F/C	42	Theo Ratliff	6 ft 10 in (2.08 m)	225 lb (102 kg)	1973–04–17	Wyoming
G	20	Eric Snow	6 ft 3 in (1.91 m)	190 lb (86 kg)	1973–04–24	Michigan State

Coaches
Head coach
- Larry Brown
Assistant(s)
- Randy Ayers
- John Calipari
- Maurice Cheeks
- John Kuester

Legend
- (DP) Unsigned draft pick
- (FA) Free agent
- (S) Suspended
- Injured

Roster
Updated: April 3, 2000

== Regular season ==
=== Season standings ===
Atlantic Division	W	L	PCT	GB	Home	Road	Div
y-Miami Heat	52	30	.634	–	33–8	19–22	18–6
x-New York Knicks	50	32	.610	2	33–8	17–24	14–10
x-Philadelphia 76ers	49	33	.598	3	29–12	20–21	13–11
Orlando Magic	41	41	.500	11	26–15	15–26	12–13
Boston Celtics	35	47	.427	17	26–15	9–32	12–12
New Jersey Nets	31	51	.378	21	22–19	9–32	9–16
Washington Wizards	29	53	.354	23	17–24	12–29	7–17

#	Eastern Conference				
#	Team	W	L	PCT	GB
1	c-Indiana Pacers	56	26	.683	–
2	y-Miami Heat	52	30	.634	4
3	x-New York Knicks	50	32	.610	6
4	x-Charlotte Hornets	49	33	.598	7
5	x-Philadelphia 76ers	49	33	.598	7
6	x-Toronto Raptors	45	37	.549	11
7	x-Detroit Pistons	42	40	.512	14
8	x-Milwaukee Bucks	42	40	.512	14
9	Orlando Magic	41	41	.500	15
10	Boston Celtics	35	47	.427	21
11	Cleveland Cavaliers	32	50	.390	24
12	New Jersey Nets	31	51	.378	25
13	Washington Wizards	29	53	.354	27
14	Atlanta Hawks	28	54	.341	28
15	Chicago Bulls	17	65	.207	39

z – clinched division title
y – clinched division title
x – clinched playoff spot

== Playoffs ==
2000 playoff game log
First Round: 3–1 (home: 2–0; road: 1–1)

Game	Date	Team	Score	High points	High rebounds	High assists	Location Attendance	Series
1	April 22	@ Charlotte	W 92–82	Allen Iverson (40)	Theo Ratliff (8)	Eric Snow (9)	Charlotte Coliseum; 15,023	1–0
2	April 24	@ Charlotte	L 98–108 (OT)	Toni Kukoč (20)	Tyrone Hill (13)	Eric Snow (13)	Charlotte Coliseum; 11,686	1–1
3	April 28	Charlotte	W 81–76	Allen Iverson (24)	Theo Ratliff (11)	Aaron McKie (5)	First Union Center; 20,849	2–1
4	May 1	Charlotte	W 105–99	Allen Iverson (26)	Matt Geiger (10)	Aaron McKie (11)	First Union Center; 20,712	3–1

Conference semifinals: 2–4 (home: 1–2; road: 1–2)

Game	Date	Team	Score	High points	High rebounds	High assists	Location Attendance	Series
1	May 6	@ Indiana	L 91–108	Allen Iverson (28)	George Lynch (14)	Eric Snow (7)	Conseco Fieldhouse; 18,345	0–1
2	May 8	@ Indiana	L 97–103	Allen Iverson (28)	Tyrone Hill (8)	Allen Iverson (10)	Conseco Fieldhouse; 18,345	0–2
3	May 10	Indiana	L 89–97	Allen Iverson (29)	Tyrone Hill (14)	Toni Kukoč (4)	First Union Center; 20,823	0–3
4	May 13	Indiana	W 92–90	Allen Iverson (19)	Tyrone Hill (15)	Allen Iverson (5)	First Union Center; 20,675	1–3
5	May 15	@ Indiana	W 107–86	Allen Iverson (37)	Hill, McKie (10)	Aaron McKie (9)	Conseco Fieldhouse; 18,345	2–3
6	May 19	Indiana	L 90–106	Aaron McKie (19)	Hill, McKie (9)	Aaron McKie (4)	First Union Center; 20,969	2–4

2000 schedule

== Player statistics ==
Legend
GP	Games played	GS	Games started	MPG	Minutes per game
FG%	Field-goal percentage	3P%	3-point field-goal percentage	FT%	Free-throw percentage
RPG	Rebounds per game	APG	Assists per game	SPG	Steals per game
BPG	Blocks per game	PPG	Points per game

=== Regular season ===
Player	GP	GS	MPG	FG%	3P%	FT%	RPG	APG	SPG	BPG	PPG
Bruce Bowen^{†}	42	0	7.4	.356	.500	.500	.9	.4	.2	.1	1.4
Ira Bowman	11	0	1.8	1.000		.500	.2	.1	.1	.0	.5
Matt Geiger	65	20	21.6	.441	.000	.779	6.0	.6	.4	.3	9.7
Tyrone Hill	68	65	31.7	.485	.000	.691	9.2	.8	.9	.4	12.0
Larry Hughes^{†}	50	5	20.4	.416	.216	.746	3.2	1.5	1.1	.2	10.0
Allen Iverson	70	70	40.8	.421	.341	.713	3.8	4.7	2.1	.1	28.4
Jumaine Jones	33	0	4.2	.379	.500	.611	1.2	.2	.2	.2	1.7
Toni Kukoč^{†}	32	8	28.6	.438	.289	.673	4.5	4.4	1.0	.3	12.4
Antonio Lang^{†}	3	0	2.0	1.000		1.000	.0	.3	.0	.0	1.0
George Lynch	75	75	32.2	.461	.417	.617	7.8	1.8	1.6	.5	9.6
Todd MacCulloch	56	6	9.4	.553		.519	2.6	.2	.2	.7	3.7
Aaron McKie	82	14	23.8	.411	.364	.829	3.0	2.9	1.3	.2	8.0
Nazr Mohammed	28	3	6.8	.389		.545	1.8	.1	.1	.4	1.9
Kevin Ollie	40	0	7.3	.449		.757	.8	1.2	.3	.0	1.8
Billy Owens^{†}	46	7	20.0	.434	.333	.594	4.2	1.3	.6	.3	5.9
Theo Ratliff	57	56	31.5	.503		.771	7.6	.6	.6	3.0	11.9
Stanley Roberts	5	1	10.2	.313	.000	.000	3.0	.6	.2	.2	2.0
Eric Snow	82	80	35.0	.430	.244	.712	3.2	7.6	1.7	.1	7.9

=== Playoffs ===
Player	GP	GS	MPG	FG%	3P%	FT%	RPG	APG	SPG	BPG	PPG
Ira Bowman	7	0	1.6	.000	.000	.000	.0	.3	.0	.0	.0
Matt Geiger	8	0	16.0	.500		.800	5.0	.3	.6	.3	8.8
Tyrone Hill	10	10	35.2	.460	.000	.705	9.7	.9	.9	.1	12.3
Allen Iverson	10	10	44.4	.384	.308	.739	4.0	4.5	1.2	.1	26.2
Jumaine Jones	4	0	2.0	.333	.000		.0	.0	.0	.0	.5
Toni Kukoč	10	0	25.7	.387	.324	.588	3.7	1.7	1.0	.3	9.3
George Lynch	10	10	29.3	.338	.143	.778	7.1	1.4	.9	.5	5.9
Todd MacCulloch	5	0	4.8	.667		.667	1.8	.0	.0	.0	1.6
Aaron McKie	10	6	33.1	.485	.343	.839	3.6	4.6	.4	.2	13.8
Kevin Ollie	10	0	6.5	.500		.889	.5	1.2	.2	.0	2.0
Theo Ratliff	10	10	37.4	.475		.723	7.9	.9	1.0	3.0	13.0
Eric Snow	5	4	27.6	.484	.750	1.000	2.0	7.0	.8	.2	7.4

- ^{†} Denotes player spent time with another team in the season. Stats reflect time with the 7ers only.

Player statistics citation:

== Awards and records ==
- Allen Iverson, All-NBA Second Team
