= 1999–2000 Miami Heat season =

NBA professional basketball team season

- Division champions
- Head coach: Pat Riley
- President: Pat Riley
- General manager: Randy Pfund
- Owner: Micky Arison
- Arena: (October–December): Miami Arena (January–May): American Airlines Arena

Results
- Record: 52–30 (.634)
- Place: Division: 1st (Atlantic); Conference: 2nd (Eastern)
- Playoff finish: Conference Semi-finals (lost to Knicks 3–4)
- Stats at Basketball Reference

Local media
- Television: Sunshine Network, WAMI
- Radio: WIOD

The 1999–2000 Miami Heat season was the 12th season for the Miami Heat in the National Basketball Association.

== Season summary ==
=== Off-season ===
During the off-season, the team signed free agents Otis Thorpe, and undrafted rookie point guard Anthony Carter.

For the season, the Heat updated their primary logo, changing the flaming basketball from light red to dark red with black seams and golden yellow flames, and changing the hoop from black to white with a black outline. The team also redesigned their home and road uniforms, adding a V-shaped collar, dark red trim, and dark red side panels to their jerseys and shorts, and the team's primary logo to the right leg of their shorts. The white home uniforms featured a black outline next to the side panels, along with golden yellow and silver inlines, while the black road uniforms featured a golden yellow outline and white and silver inlines.

The team's new uniforms would remain in use until 2009, where they would move their primary logo to the left leg of their shorts; the new primary logo is still present as of 2026.

=== Regular season ===
The Heat played the first two months of the regular season at the Miami Arena, and played their final home game there on December 28, 1999, against the Minnesota Timberwolves; the team then moved into their new arena, the American Airlines Arena on January 2, 2000, and played their first game there against the Orlando Magic.

The Heat got off to a 15–4 start to the regular season, and later on held a 30–17 record at the All-Star break. However, Tim Hardaway only played 52 games due to knee injuries, and Voshon Lenard was out for the remainder of the season due to a lower abdominal strain after 53 games. At mid-season, the team signed free agent Bruce Bowen, who was previously released by the Chicago Bulls, who acquired him from the Philadelphia 76ers in a three-team trade. The Heat posted a seven-game winning streak between March and April, and finished in first place in the Atlantic Division with a 52–30 record, earning the second seed in the Eastern Conference; the team qualified for the NBA playoffs for the fifth consecutive year.

Alonzo Mourning averaged 21.7 points, 9.5 rebounds and 3.7 blocks per game, and was named the NBA Defensive Player of the Year for the second consecutive year; he was also named to the All-NBA Second Team, and to the NBA All-Defensive First Team. In addition, Jamal Mashburn averaged 17.5 points, 5.0 rebounds and 3.9 assists per game, and led the Heat with 112 three-point field goals, while Hardaway provided the team with 13.4 points and 7.4 assists per game, Lenard contributed 11.9 points per game off the bench as the team's sixth man, and P.J. Brown provided with 9.6 points and 7.5 rebounds per game. Meanwhile, three-point specialist Dan Majerle contributed 7.3 points and 1.3 steals per game, along with 110 three-point field goals, while Clarence Weatherspoon averaged 7.2 points and 5.8 rebounds per game off the bench, and Carter provided with 6.3 points, 4.8 assists and 1.2 steals per game.

During the NBA All-Star weekend at The Arena in Oakland in Oakland, California, Mourning was selected for the 2000 NBA All-Star Game, as a member of the Eastern Conference All-Star team. Mourning also finished in third place in Most Valuable Player voting, behind Shaquille O'Neal of the Los Angeles Lakers, and Kevin Garnett of the Timberwolves, while head coach Pat Riley finished tied in fifth place in Coach of the Year voting.

The Heat finished 13th in the NBA in home-game attendance, with an attendance of 706,725 at the American Airlines Arena during the regular season.

=== NBA playoffs ===
In the Eastern Conference First Round of the 2000 NBA playoffs, the Heat faced off against the 7th–seeded Detroit Pistons, a team that featured All-Star forward Grant Hill, All-Star guard Jerry Stackhouse, and Lindsey Hunter. Despite the absence of Hardaway due to his knee injury, the Heat won the first two games over the Pistons at home at the American Airlines Arena. In Game 2, Hill re-injured his ankle sustained from the final month of the regular season, as the Heat defeated the Pistons, 84–82 to take a 2–0 series lead. With Hill out for Game 3, the Heat defeated the Pistons on the road, 91–72 at The Palace of Auburn Hills to win the series in a three-game sweep.

In the Eastern Conference Semi-finals, and for the fourth consecutive year, the team faced off against the 3rd–seeded New York Knicks, who were led by All-Star guard Allan Houston, Latrell Sprewell and Patrick Ewing. With the return of Hardaway, and with the series tied at 2–2, the Heat won Game 5 over the Knicks at home, 87–81 at the American Airlines Arena to take a 3–2 series lead. However, the Heat lost Game 6 to the Knicks on the road, 72–70 at Madison Square Garden, and then lost Game 7 at the American Airlines Arena, 83–82, thus losing in a hard-fought seven-game series.

=== Aftermath ===
Following the season, Mashburn, Brown and Thorpe were all traded to the Charlotte Hornets, while Lenard and Mark Strickland were both traded to the Denver Nuggets, and Weatherspoon was dealt to the Cleveland Cavaliers in a three-team trade.

== Offseason ==
=== Draft picks ===
Round	Pick	Player	Position	Nationality	School/Club team
1	25	Tim James	SF	United States	University of Miami
2	53	Rodney Buford	SG	United States	Creighton University

== Roster ==
1999–2000 Miami Heat roster
Players

Pos.	No.	Player	Height	Weight	DOB	From
SF	12	Bruce Bowen	6 ft 7 in (2.01 m)	185 lb (84 kg)	1971–06–14	Cal State Fullerton
PF	42	P. J. Brown	6 ft 11 in (2.11 m)	225 lb (102 kg)	1969–10–14	Louisiana Tech
SG	32	Rodney Buford	6 ft 5 in (1.96 m)	189 lb (86 kg)	1977–11–02	Creighton
PG	25	Anthony Carter	6 ft 1 in (1.85 m)	190 lb (86 kg)	1975–06–16	Hawaiʻi
C	4	Duane Causwell	7 ft 0 in (2.13 m)	240 lb (109 kg)	1968–05–31	Temple
PG	10	Tim Hardaway	6 ft 0 in (1.83 m)	175 lb (79 kg)	1966–09–01	UTEP
SF	40	Tim James	6 ft 7 in (2.01 m)	212 lb (96 kg)	1976–12–26	Miami (FL)
PF	6	Harold Jamison	6 ft 8 in (2.03 m)	260 lb (118 kg)	1976–11–20	Clemson
SG	21	Voshon Lenard	6 ft 4 in (1.93 m)	205 lb (93 kg)	1973–05–14	Minnesota
SG	9	Dan Majerle	6 ft 6 in (1.98 m)	215 lb (98 kg)	1965–09–09	Central Michigan
SF	24	Jamal Mashburn	6 ft 8 in (2.03 m)	240 lb (109 kg)	1972–11–29	Kentucky
C	33	Alonzo Mourning	6 ft 10 in (2.08 m)	240 lb (109 kg)	1970–02–08	Georgetown
SF	5	Mark Strickland	6 ft 9 in (2.06 m)	210 lb (95 kg)	1970–07–14	Temple
PF	52	Otis Thorpe	6 ft 9 in (2.06 m)	225 lb (102 kg)	1962–08–05	Providence
PF	35	Clarence Weatherspoon	6 ft 6 in (1.98 m)	240 lb (109 kg)	1970–09–08	Southern Miss

Coaches
Head coach
- Pat Riley
Assistant(s)
- Keith Askins
- Jeff Bzdelik
- Bill Foran
- Marc Iavaroni
- Bob McAdoo
- Erik Spoelstra
- Stan Van Gundy

Legend
- (DP) Unsigned draft pick
- (FA) Free agent
- (S) Suspended
- Injured

Roster
Updated: February 23, 2000

== Regular season ==
=== Standings ===
Atlantic Division	W	L	PCT	GB	Home	Road	Div
y-Miami Heat	52	30	.634	–	33–8	19–22	18–6
x-New York Knicks	50	32	.610	2	33–8	17–24	14–10
x-Philadelphia 76ers	49	33	.598	3	29–12	20–21	13–11
Orlando Magic	41	41	.500	11	26–15	15–26	12–13
Boston Celtics	35	47	.427	17	26–15	9–32	12–12
New Jersey Nets	31	51	.378	21	22–19	9–32	9–16
Washington Wizards	29	53	.354	23	17–24	12–29	7–17

#	Eastern Conference				
#	Team	W	L	PCT	GB
1	c-Indiana Pacers	56	26	.683	–
2	y-Miami Heat	52	30	.634	4
3	x-New York Knicks	50	32	.610	6
4	x-Charlotte Hornets	49	33	.598	7
5	x-Philadelphia 76ers	49	33	.598	7
6	x-Toronto Raptors	45	37	.549	11
7	x-Detroit Pistons	42	40	.512	14
8	x-Milwaukee Bucks	42	40	.512	14
9	Orlando Magic	41	41	.500	15
10	Boston Celtics	35	47	.427	21
11	Cleveland Cavaliers	32	50	.390	24
12	New Jersey Nets	31	51	.378	25
13	Washington Wizards	29	53	.354	27
14	Atlanta Hawks	28	54	.341	28
15	Chicago Bulls	17	65	.207	39

z - clinched division title
y - clinched division title
x - clinched playoff spot

== Playoffs ==
2000 playoff game log
First round: 3–0 (home: 2–0; road: 1–0)

Game	Date	Team	Score	High points	High rebounds	High assists	Location Attendance	Series
1	April 22	Detroit	W 95–85	Jamal Mashburn (29)	Dan Majerle (10)	Anthony Carter (7)	American Airlines Arena; 16,500	1–0
2	April 25	Detroit	W 84–82	Jamal Mashburn (24)	Alonzo Mourning (8)	Anthony Carter (13)	American Airlines Arena; 16,500	2–0
3	April 29	@ Detroit	W 91–72	Clarence Weatherspoon (18)	Thorpe, Weatherspoon (10)	Anthony Carter (9)	The Palace of Auburn Hills; 14,507	3–0

Conference Semi-finals: 3–4 (home: 2–2; road: 1–2)

Game	Date	Team	Score	High points	High rebounds	High assists	Location Attendance	Series
1	May 7	New York	W 87–83	Alonzo Mourning (26)	P. J. Brown (16)	Tim Hardaway (7)	American Airlines Arena; 20,053	1–0
2	May 9	New York	L 76–82	Jamal Mashburn (25)	Alonzo Mourning (17)	three players tied (3)	American Airlines Arena; 20,078	1–1
3	May 12	@ New York	W 77–76 (OT)	Alonzo Mourning (23)	P. J. Brown (12)	Anthony Carter (8)	Madison Square Garden; 19,763	2–1
4	May 14	@ New York	L 83–91	Alonzo Mourning (27)	Alonzo Mourning (14)	Anthony Carter (7)	Madison Square Garden; 19,763	2–2
5	May 17	New York	W 87–81	Jamal Mashburn (21)	P. J. Brown (12)	Anthony Carter (5)	American Airlines Arena; 20,021	3–2
6	May 19	@ New York	L 70–72	Alonzo Mourning (22)	Majerle, Mourning (10)	Dan Majerle (7)	Madison Square Garden; 19,763	3–3
7	May 21	New York	L 82–83	Alonzo Mourning (29)	Alonzo Mourning (13)	Tim Hardaway (7)	American Airlines Arena; 20,063	3–4

2000 schedule

== Player statistics ==
=== Ragular season ===
Player	POS	GP	GS	MP	REB	AST	STL	BLK	PTS	MPG	RPG	APG	SPG	BPG	PPG
P. J. Brown	PF	80	80	2,302	600	145	65	61	764	28.8	7.5	1.8	.8	.8	9.6
Alonzo Mourning	C	79	78	2,748	753	123	40	294	1,718	34.8	9.5	1.6	.5	3.7	21.7
Anthony Carter	PG	79	30	1,859	199	378	93	5	498	23.5	2.5	4.8	1.2	.1	6.3
Clarence Weatherspoon	PF	78	2	1,615	449	93	51	49	565	20.7	5.8	1.2	.7	.6	7.2
Jamal Mashburn	SF	76	76	2,828	381	298	79	14	1,328	37.2	5.0	3.9	1.0	.2	17.5
Dan Majerle	SG	69	69	2,308	333	206	89	17	506	33.4	4.8	3.0	1.3	.2	7.3
Mark Strickland	SF	58	5	663	140	22	15	18	284	11.4	2.4	.4	.3	.3	4.9
Voshon Lenard	SG	53	13	1,434	153	136	41	15	629	27.1	2.9	2.6	.8	.3	11.9
Tim Hardaway	PG	52	52	1,672	150	385	49	4	696	32.2	2.9	7.4	.9	.1	13.4
Otis Thorpe	PF	51	1	777	166	33	26	9	279	15.2	3.3	.6	.5	.2	5.5
Rodney Buford	SG	34	0	386	48	21	10	8	147	11.4	1.4	.6	.3	.2	4.3
Rex Walters	PG	33	0	389	36	65	6	0	93	11.8	1.1	2.0	.2	.0	2.8
Bruce Bowen^{†}	SF	27	2	567	60	18	14	10	137	21.0	2.2	.7	.5	.4	5.1
Duane Causwell	C	25	2	185	47	2	2	16	66	7.4	1.9	.1	.1	.6	2.6
Harold Jamison	PF	12	0	74	21	4	2	1	18	6.2	1.8	.3	.2	.1	1.5
Tim James	SF	4	0	23	4	2	0	3	11	5.8	1.0	.5	.0	.8	2.8

- ^{†} Denotes player spent time with another team in the season. Stats reflect time with the Heat only.

=== Playoffs ===
Player	POS	GP	GS	MP	REB	AST	STL	BLK	PTS	MPG	RPG	APG	SPG	BPG	PPG
Jamal Mashburn	SF	10	10	423	46	32	11	2	175	42.3	4.6	3.2	1.1	.2	17.5
Alonzo Mourning	C	10	10	376	100	14	2	33	216	37.6	10.0	1.4	.2	3.3	21.6
Dan Majerle	SG	10	10	372	70	32	21	1	90	37.2	7.0	3.2	2.1	.1	9.0
P. J. Brown	PF	10	10	308	82	11	8	4	75	30.8	8.2	1.1	.8	.4	7.5
Anthony Carter	PG	10	3	275	40	56	12	2	77	27.5	4.0	5.6	1.2	.2	7.7
Clarence Weatherspoon	PF	10	0	170	41	1	4	3	64	17.0	4.1	.1	.4	.3	6.4
Bruce Bowen	SF	10	0	157	10	8	7	4	35	15.7	1.0	.8	.7	.4	3.5
Otis Thorpe	PF	10	0	136	29	3	0	2	33	13.6	2.9	.3	.0	.2	3.3
Tim Hardaway	PG	7	7	182	15	33	5	0	54	26.0	2.1	4.7	.7	.0	7.7
Rodney Buford	SG	1	0	16	1	1	0	0	11	16.0	1.0	1.0	.0	.0	11.0
Mark Strickland	SF	1	0	10	0	0	2	0	2	10.0	.0	.0	2.0	.0	2.0

== Awards and honors ==
- Alonzo Mourning, NBA Defensive Player of the Year Award
- Alonzo Mourning, All-NBA Second Team
- Alonzo Mourning, NBA All-Defensive First Team
