= 1999–2000 Toronto Raptors season =

Basketball team season history

- Head coach: Butch Carter
- General manager: Glen Grunwald
- Owners: Maple Leaf Sports & Entertainment
- Arena: Air Canada Centre

Results
- Record: 45–37 (.549)
- Place: Division: 3rd (Central); Conference: 6th (Eastern)
- Playoff finish: First round (lost to Knicks 0–3)
- Stats at Basketball Reference

Local media
- Television: CTV Sportsnet; TSN; The Score; CTV
- Radio: CJCL

The 1999–2000 Toronto Raptors season was the fifth season for the Toronto Raptors in the National Basketball Association.

== Season summary ==
=== Off-season ===
In the 1999 NBA draft, the Raptors received the fifth overall pick from the Denver Nuggets via trade, and selected small forward, and high school basketball star Jonathan Bender, and also selected center, and Bosnian basketball star Aleksandar Radojević out of Barton Community College with the twelfth overall pick; the team soon traded Bender to the Indiana Pacers in exchange for Antonio Davis, and signed free agents Muggsy Bogues, and three-point specialist Dell Curry during the off-season.

However, Radojević only played just three games with the Raptors due to a left knee injury; Radojević played in the team's season opener at home against the Boston Celtics, and in the team's final two games of the regular season on the road, against the Miami Heat and the Orlando Magic.

For the season, the Raptors redesigned their home and road uniforms, removing the zig-zag pinstripes from their previous uniforms. The white home uniforms featured a purple trim, and purple side panels with a red outline on their jerseys and shorts, along with two silver lines on the left and right sides of their jerseys. The purple road uniforms featured a red trim, and black side panels; the back of the road jerseys were also black. The new home uniforms would remain in use until 2006, while the new road uniforms would last until 2003, where the city name "Toronto" would be replaced with the team name "Raptors" on the front of their jerseys.

=== Regular season ===
In their first full season playing at the Air Canada Centre, and with the addition of Davis, Curry and Bogues, the Raptors won seven of their first ten games of the regular season. The team got off to a 12–6 start to the season, but then lost five of their next six games, and later on held a 26–21 record at the All-Star break. At mid-season, the team traded Alvin Williams to the Celtics in exchange for Danny Fortson, but the trade was voided due to Williams failing his physical exam; Williams only played 55 games this season due to knee injuries. The Raptors showed improvement posting a seven-game winning streak between February and March, and finished in third place in the Central Division with a 45–37 record, earning the sixth seed in the Eastern Conference; the team qualified for their first ever NBA playoff appearance in franchise history.

Second-year star Vince Carter averaged 25.7 points, 5.8 rebounds, 3.9 assists and 1.3 steals per game, and was named to the All-NBA Third Team, while Tracy McGrady averaged 15.4 points, 6.3 rebounds and 1.9 blocks per game, and Doug Christie contributed 12.4 points, 4.4 assists and 1.4 steals per game. In addition, Davis provided the team with 11.5 points, 8.8 rebounds and 1.3 blocks per game, while Charles Oakley provided with 6.8 points, 6.9 rebounds and 1.3 steals per game. Off the bench, Kevin Willis averaged 7.6 points and 6.1 rebounds per game, while Curry contributed 7.6 points per game, Williams provided with 5.3 points and 2.3 assists per game, and Bogues contributed 5.1 points and 3.7 assists per game.

During the NBA All-Star weekend at The Arena in Oakland in Oakland, California, Carter was selected for the 2000 NBA All-Star Game, as a member of the Eastern Conference All-Star team; it was his first ever All-Star appearance. In addition, Carter and McGrady both participated in the NBA Slam Dunk Contest, in which Carter won by scoring 50 on 3 of his 5 dunk attempts. Carter also finished in tenth place in Most Valuable Player voting, while McGrady finished tied in third place in Sixth Man of the Year voting, and also finished in fifth place in Most Improved Player voting, and head coach Butch Carter finished tied in fifth place in Coach of the Year voting.

The Raptors finished ninth in the NBA in home-game attendance, with an attendance of 756,496 at the Air Canada Centre during the regular season.

=== NBA playoffs ===
In the Eastern Conference First Round of the 2000 NBA playoffs, the Raptors faced off against the 3rd–seeded New York Knicks, who were led by All-Star guard Allan Houston, Latrell Sprewell and Patrick Ewing; it was the first ever NBA playoff appearance for both Carter and McGrady. However, the Raptors lost the first two games to the Knicks on the road at Madison Square Garden, before losing Game 3 at home, 87–80 at the Air Canada Centre, thus losing the series in a three-game sweep; Carter struggled shooting just .300 in field-goal percentage, averaging 19.3 points per game during the series.

=== Notable incidents ===
On June 13, 2000, the Raptors fired Butch Carter as head coach, after the organization decided they wanted a return of "stability" to the franchise. In his last season as coach of the Raptors, he invited friend and rap star Percy Miller, otherwise known as "Master P", to the pre-season training camp to try out for the team. Carter claimed it was an attempt to deflect media attention away from Vince Carter, but was criticized for trying to draw attention to himself and his friendship with Miller. Carter also released a book where he claimed that his coach at Indiana University, Bobby Knight, had launched into a racist tirade during practice, which Knight denied.

Carter was involved in public feuds with Vince Carter and McGrady, limiting their minutes because he did not want to burn them out in their young careers. Carter also had an off-court feud with his ex-wife. During the opening round of the NBA playoffs against the Knicks, Knicks center and former Raptors player Marcus Camby, who had played under Carter during the second half of the 1997–98 season, made what Carter considered an inflammatory remark about Carter by calling him a "liar". Carter decided to file a $5-million defamation suit against Camby for what he said were inaccurate statements. NBA Deputy Commissioner Russ Granik believed it was a frivolous suit and criticized Carter for filing it, which led to Carter dropping the suit.

In his last few weeks as Raptors coach, Butch Carter made attempts to ouster friend Glen Grunwald as General Manager, and was cited as one of the reasons why McGrady decided to leave the team. The Raptors organization, players, and fans all had decided that Carter's off-court issues were too much of a distraction for the team going forward.

=== Aftermath ===
Following the season, McGrady was traded to the Orlando Magic after three seasons with the Raptors, while Christie was traded to the Sacramento Kings, Dee Brown signed as a free agent with the Magic, and Butch Carter was fired as head coach.

== NBA draft ==
Round	Pick	Player	Position	Nationality	College
1	5	Jonathan Bender (from Denver, traded to Indiana for Antonio Davis)	Forward	United States	
1	12	Aleksandar Radojević	Center	FR Yugoslavia	Barton County JC (Kansas)

== Roster ==
1999–2000 Toronto Raptors roster
Players

Pos.	No.	Player	Height	Weight	DOB	From
G	14	Muggsy Bogues	5 ft 3 in (1.60 m)	136 lb (62 kg)	1965–01–09	Wake Forest
G	7	Dee Brown	6 ft 1 in (1.85 m)	160 lb (73 kg)	1968–11–29	Jacksonville
G/F	15	Vince Carter	6 ft 6 in (1.98 m)	220 lb (100 kg)	1977–01–26	North Carolina
G/F	13	Doug Christie	6 ft 6 in (1.98 m)	200 lb (91 kg)	1970–05–09	Pepperdine
G	30	Dell Curry	6 ft 4 in (1.93 m)	200 lb (91 kg)	1964–06–25	Virginia Tech
F/C	33	Antonio Davis	6 ft 9 in (2.06 m)	215 lb (98 kg)	1968–10–31	UTEP
F/C	22	Sean Marks (injured)	6 ft 10 in (2.08 m)	250 lb (113 kg)	1975–08–23	California
F	1	Tracy McGrady	6 ft 8 in (2.03 m)	210 lb (95 kg)	1979–05–24	Mt. Zion Christian Academy HS (NC)
F	34	Charles Oakley	6 ft 9 in (2.06 m)	225 lb (102 kg)	1963–12–18	Virginia Union
C	25	Aleksandar Radojević (injured)	7 ft 3 in (2.21 m)	250 lb (113 kg)	1976–08–08	Barton CC
F/C	4	Michael Stewart	6 ft 10 in (2.08 m)	230 lb (104 kg)	1975–04–25	California
F/C	12	John Thomas	6 ft 9 in (2.06 m)	265 lb (120 kg)	1975–09–08	Minnesota
G	20	Alvin Williams	6 ft 5 in (1.96 m)	185 lb (84 kg)	1974–08–06	Villanova
F/C	42	Kevin Willis	7 ft 0 in (2.13 m)	220 lb (100 kg)	1962–09–06	Michigan State
G	3	Haywoode Workman	6 ft 2 in (1.88 m)	180 lb (82 kg)	1966–01–23	Oral Roberts

Coaches
Head coach
- Butch Carter
Assistant(s)
- Joe Harrington
- Brian James
- Jim Thomas

Legend
- (DP) Unsigned draft pick
- (FA) Free agent
- (S) Suspended
- Injured

Roster
Updated: February 9, 2000

== Regular season ==
=== Standings ===
Central Division	W	L	PCT	GB	Home	Road	Div
y-Indiana Pacers	56	26	.683	–	36–5	20–21	20–8
x-Charlotte Hornets	49	33	.598	7	30–11	19–22	20–8
x-Toronto Raptors	45	37	.549	11	26–15	19–22	16–12
x-Detroit Pistons	42	40	.512	14	27–14	15–26	16–12
x-Milwaukee Bucks	42	40	.512	14	23–18	19–22	16–12
Cleveland Cavaliers	32	50	.390	24	22–19	10–31	8–20
Atlanta Hawks	28	54	.341	28	21–20	7–34	11–17
Chicago Bulls	17	65	.207	39	12–29	5–36	5–23

#	Eastern Conference				
#	Team	W	L	PCT	GB
1	c-Indiana Pacers	56	26	.683	–
2	y-Miami Heat	52	30	.634	4
3	x-New York Knicks	50	32	.610	6
4	x-Charlotte Hornets	49	33	.598	7
5	x-Philadelphia 76ers	49	33	.598	7
6	x-Toronto Raptors	45	37	.549	11
7	x-Detroit Pistons	42	40	.512	14
8	x-Milwaukee Bucks	42	40	.512	14
9	Orlando Magic	41	41	.500	15
10	Boston Celtics	35	47	.427	21
11	Cleveland Cavaliers	32	50	.390	24
12	New Jersey Nets	31	51	.378	25
13	Washington Wizards	29	53	.354	27
14	Atlanta Hawks	28	54	.341	28
15	Chicago Bulls	17	65	.207	39

=== Game log ===
1999–2000 game log
November: 9–6 (home: 4–3; road: 5–3)

Game	Date	Team	Score	High points	High rebounds	High assists	Location Attendance	Record
1	November 2	Boston	L 90–103	Doug Christie (20)	Doug Christie, Kevin Willis (7)	Muggsy Bogues (5)	Air Canada Centre; 17,711	0–1
2	November 4	Miami	W 97–86	Doug Christie (28)	Antonio Davis (13)	Charles Oakley (7)	Air Canada Centre; 16,389	1-1
3	November 5	@ New Jersey	W 112–92	Vince Carter (26)	Tracy McGrady, Charles Oakley, Kevin Willis (9)	Tracy McGrady (4)	Continental Airlines Arena; 15,517	2–1
4	November 7	Charlotte	W 109–99	Vince Carter (25)	Antonio Davis (12)	Muggsy Bogues (11)	Air Canada Centre; 16,658	3–1
5	November 11	@ Detroit	W 123–106	Doug Christie (24)	Kevin Willis (13)	Muggsy Bogues (7)	The Palace of Auburn Hills; 13,157	4–1
6	November 14	Philadelphia	L 90–93	Vince Carter (27)	Vince Carter (11)	Vince Carter (5)	Air Canada Centre; 16,661	4–2
7	November 16	Detroit	W 89–85	Antonio Davis (24)	Antonio Davis (15)	Muggsy Bogues (6)	Air Canada Centre; 14,273	5–2
8	November 18	@ Washington	L 81–92	Vince Carter (23)	Vince Carter (11)	Charles Oakley (6)	MCI Center; 12,134	5–3
9	November 19	L.A. Clippers	W 106–100	Antonio Davis (20)	Charles Oakley (8)	Doug Christie, Tracy McGrady (5)	Air Canada Centre; 16,368	6–3
10	November 21	@ L.A. Lakers	W 111–102	Vince Carter (34)	Vince Carter (13)	Dee Brown, Vince Carter (4)	Staples Center; 18,676	7–3
11	November 23	@ Phoenix	L 93–94	Vince Carter (19)	Vince Carter, Antonio Davis, Kevin Willis (7)	Dee Brown, Charles Oakley (5)	America West Arena; 18,718	7–4
12	November 24	@ Denver	L 84–109	Vince Carter (16)	Vince Carter, Kevin Willis (8)	Doug Christie (5)	Pepsi Center; 13,624	7–5
13	November 26	@ Utah	W 100–87	Vince Carter (18)	Charles Oakley, Kevin Willis (9)	Vince Carter (4)	Delta Center; 19,771	8–5
14	November 27	@ Golden State	W 106–88	Antonio Davis (28)	Tracy McGrady (7)	Doug Christie, Tracy McGrady, Charles Oakley (4)	The Arena in Oakland; 12,251	9–5
15	November 30	Atlanta	L 89–107	Antonio Davis (16)	Antonio Davis (12)	Dee Brown (5)	Air Canada Centre; 16,862	9–6

December: 8–6 (home: 5–3; road: 3–3)

Game	Date	Team	Score	High points	High rebounds	High assists	Location Attendance	Record
16	December 3	Washington	W 95–93	Vince Carter (23)	Charles Oakley (9)	Charles Oakley (7)	Air Canada Centre; 15,787	10–6
17	December 5	San Antonio	W 98–92	Vince Carter (39)	Charles Oakley (11)	Doug Christie (9)	Air Canada Centre; 18,455	11–6
18	December 7	Cleveland	W 101–98	Vince Carter (32)	Charles Oakley (9)	Muggsy Bogues (8)	Air Canada Centre; 15,162	12–6
19	December 10	Milwaukee	L 91–107	Vince Carter (25)	Kevin Willis (10)	Doug Christie (6)	Air Canada Centre; 17,963	12–7
20	December 12	Utah	L 88–103	Vince Carter, Kevin Willis (16)	Antonio Davis, Kevin Willis (10)	Dee Brown, Vince Carter, Charles Oakley (3)	Air Canada Centre; 18,163	12–8
21	December 14	Indiana	W 105–97	Vince Carter (24)	Antonio Davis (14)	Tracy McGrady, Charles Oakley, Alvin Williams (6)	Air Canada Centre; 15,774	13–8
22	December 15	@ Philadelphia	L 91–93	Vince Carter (19)	Antonio Davis (18)	Dee Brown, Tracy McGrady (6)	First Union Center; 15,421	13–9
23	December 17	@ Orlando	L 98–112	Vince Carter (23)	Antonio Davis (13)	Tracy McGrady (6)	Orlando Arena; 13,481	13–10
24	December 19	L.A. Lakers	L 88–94	Vince Carter (29)	Antonio Davis (16)	Dee Brown (5)	Air Canada Centre; 19,800	13–11
25	December 21	New Jersey	W 116–87	Vince Carter (24)	Kevin Willis (10)	Alvin Williams (12)	Air Canada Centre; 18,677	14–11
26	December 22	@ New York	L 90–91	Vince Carter (36)	Antonio Davis (17)	Muggsy Bogues, Doug Christie (4)	Madison Square Garden; 19,763	14–12
27	December 26	@ Cleveland	W 98–95	Vince Carter (36)	Antonio Davis, Charles Oakley (10)	Vince Carter (8)	Gund Arena; 14,135	15–12
28	December 28	@ Houston	W 100–99	Vince Carter (35)	Vince Carter (12)	Muggsy Bogues, Alvin Williams (5)	Compaq Center; 16,285	16–12
29	December 30	@ Dallas	W 109–104	Tracy McGrady (24)	Antonio Davis (15)	Vince Carter (8)	Reunion Arena; 16,490	17–12

January: 7–7 (home: 6–2; road: 1–5)

Game	Date	Team	Score	High points	High rebounds	High assists	Location Attendance	Record
30	January 4	Portland	L 90–114	Tracy McGrady (18)	Kevin Willis (8)	Doug Christie, Tracy McGrady (4)	Air Canada Centre; 19,800	17–13
31	January 6	Sacramento	W 101–89	Charles Oakley (20)	Charles Oakley (16)	Alvin Williams (10)	Air Canada Centre; 19,800	18–13
32	January 7	@ Atlanta	L 97–105	Vince Carter (34)	Vince Carter, Charles Oakley, Kevin Willis (7)	Doug Christie (5)	Philips Arena; 14,452	18–14
33	January 9	Vancouver	L 97–107	Vince Carter, Antonio Davis (20)	Vince Carter (10)	Vince Carter, Charles Oakley (6)	Air Canada Centre; 19,188	18–15
34	January 11	@ Washington	L 89–117	Vince Carter (19)	Antonio Davis (15)	Muggsy Bogues (6)	MCI Center; 13,610	18–16
35	January 12	Orlando	W 108–102	Vince Carter (30)	Antonio Davis (9)	Vince Carter (9)	Air Canada Centre; 17,241	19–16
36	January 14	Milwaukee	W 115–110	Vince Carter (47)	Charles Oakley (12)	Doug Christie (8)	Air Canada Centre; 19,246	20–16
37	January 15	@ Milwaukee	L 97–118	Doug Christie (31)	Kevin Willis (12)	Muggsy Bogues, Vince Carter (5)	Bradley Center; 18,717	20–17
38	January 17	@ Charlotte	L 94–115	Vince Carter (24)	Michael Stewart (8)	Vince Carter (6)	Charlotte Coliseum; 20,278	20–18
39	January 19	@ Boston	L 90–94	Vince Carter (20)	Charles Oakley (10)	Muggsy Bogues, Alvin Williams (5)	FleetCenter; 16,124	20–19
40	January 23	Seattle	W 94–77	Antonio Davis, Tracy McGrady (17)	Kevin Willis (12)	Doug Christie (6)	Air Canada Centre; 19,800	21–19
41	January 26	Washington	W 120–105	Vince Carter (26)	Kevin Willis (9)	Charles Oakley (8)	Air Canada Centre; 17,582	22–19
42	January 28	Miami	W 108–93	Vince Carter (23)	Antonio Davis (12)	Charles Oakley (7)	Air Canada Centre; 19,800	23–19
43	January 29	@ Chicago	W 106–89	Vince Carter (22)	Doug Christie, Antonio Davis, Kevin Willis (6)	Doug Christie (9)	United Center; 22,104	24–19

February: 6–6 (home: 4–3; road: 2–3)

Game	Date	Team	Score	High points	High rebounds	High assists	Location Attendance	Record
44	February 3	@ San Antonio	L 95–112	Tracy McGrady (21)	Antonio Davis (8)	Doug Christie, Charles Oakley (5)	Alamodome; 19,048	24–20
45	February 5	@ Milwaukee	W 98–95	Vince Carter (30)	Vince Carter (11)	Charles Oakley (7)	Bradley Center; 18,717	25–20
46	February 8	Atlanta	W 109–88	Vince Carter (36)	Antonio Davis, Kevin Willis (9)	Muggsy Bogues (12)	Air Canada Centre; 16,636	26–20
47	February 9	@ Detroit	L 108–115 (OT)	Vince Carter (34)	Vince Carter (13)	Vince Carter, Charles Oakley (4)	The Palace of Auburn Hills; 17,710	26–21
48	February 15	New York	W 91–70	Vince Carter (29)	Antonio Davis (14)	Doug Christie (13)	Air Canada Centre; 19,800	27–21
49	February 16	@ Indiana	L 101–109	Vince Carter (21)	Antonio Davis (13)	Doug Christie (6)	Conseco Fieldhouse; 18,345	27–22
50	February 18	Denver	L 91–95	Vince Carter (31)	Muggsy Bogues, Kevin Willis (8)	Muggsy Bogues (5)	Air Canada Centre; 17,570	27–23
51	February 20	Dallas	L 96–100	Vince Carter (24)	Antonio Davis (8)	Vince Carter, Doug Christie (7)	Air Canada Centre; 19,800	27–24
52	February 23	@ New York	W 99–88	Vince Carter (33)	Vince Carter (9)	Vince Carter (9)	Madison Square Garden; 19,763	28–24
53	February 25	Minnesota	L 85–107	Vince Carter (23)	Tracy McGrady (9)	Doug Christie, Haywoode Workman (4)	Air Canada Centre; 19,800	28–25
54	February 27	Phoenix	W 103–102	Vince Carter (51)	Antonio Davis (11)	Doug Christie (7)	Air Canada Centre; 19,800	29–25
55	February 29	Chicago	W 87–80	Vince Carter (26)	Tracy McGrady (15)	Doug Christie (7)	Air Canada Centre; 18,232	30–25

March: 10–7 (home: 4–2; road: 6–5)

Game	Date	Team	Score	High points	High rebounds	High assists	Location Attendance	Record
56	March 1	@ Boston	W 96–94	Vince Carter (28)	Tracy McGrady (11)	Tracy McGrady (6)	FleetCenter; 17,198	31–25
57	March 3	Boston	W 114–104	Vince Carter (30)	Vince Carter (7)	Vince Carter (7)	Air Canada Centre; 19,437	32–25
58	March 5	@ Vancouver	W 94–92	Vince Carter (28)	Tracy McGrady (10)	Muggsy Bogues (7)	General Motors Place; 19,193	33–25
59	March 6	@ Portland	W 109–90	Vince Carter (35)	Kevin Willis (8)	Vince Carter, Doug Christie (5)	Rose Garden; 20,516	34–25
60	March 8	@ L.A. Clippers	W 95–94	Vince Carter (23)	Antonio Davis (11)	Vince Carter (5)	Staples Center; 18,176	35–25
61	March 10	@ Sacramento	L 88–103	Vince Carter (25)	Antonio Davis (15)	Doug Christie (4)	ARCO Arena; 17,317	35–26
62	March 12	@ Seattle	W 99–97	Vince Carter (34)	Kevin Willis (13)	Tracy McGrady (6)	KeyArena; 17,072	36–26
63	March 14	Golden State	W 85–78	Vince Carter (23)	Kevin Willis (15)	Muggsy Bogues (7)	Air Canada Centre; 19,800	37–26
64	March 17	Orlando	W 95–91	Vince Carter (30)	Tracy McGrady (13)	Doug Christie (7)	Air Canada Centre; 19,985	38–26
65	March 19	Houston	W 100–98	Vince Carter (37)	Kevin Willis (13)	Doug Christie (5)	Air Canada Centre; 19,876	39–26
66	March 21	New Jersey	L 93–100	Vince Carter (23)	Antonio Davis, Tracy McGrady (12)	Doug Christie (7)	Air Canada Centre; 19,800	39–27
67	March 22	@ Philadelphia	L 93–106	Vince Carter (26)	Antonio Davis (9)	Doug Christie (8)	First Union Center; 20,753	39–28
68	March 24	Charlotte	L 84–102	Vince Carter (18)	Doug Christie (11)	Doug Christie, Tracy McGrady (4)	Air Canada Centre; 19,800	39–29
69	March 26	@ Minnesota	L 101–106 (OT)	Vince Carter (38)	Vince Carter, Antonio Davis (7)	Tracy McGrady (8)	Target Center; 19,902	39–30
70	March 28	@ Cleveland	W 99–96	Vince Carter (19)	Vince Carter, Tracy McGrady, Charles Oakley (8)	Vince Carter (6)	Gund Arena; 20,562	40–30
71	March 30	@ New Jersey	L 103–107	Vince Carter (39)	Antonio Davis (13)	Vince Carter (7)	Continental Airlines Arena; 18,493	40–31
72	March 31	@ Charlotte	L 101–110 (OT)	Vince Carter (31)	Tracy McGrady (13)	Muggsy Bogues (7)	Charlotte Coliseum; 23,799	40–32

April: 5–5 (home: 3–2; road: 2–3)

Game	Date	Team	Score	High points	High rebounds	High assists	Location Attendance	Record
73	April 2	Indiana	L 83–104	Tracy McGrady (24)	Antonio Davis (11)	Doug Christie, Tracy McGrady (5)	Air Canada Centre; 19,800	40–33
74	April 4	Detroit	L 88–104	Tracy McGrady (28)	Antonio Davis (12)	Muggsy Bogues, Vince Carter, Tracy McGrady (5)	Air Canada Centre; 19,800	40–34
75	April 7	@ Atlanta	W 104–84	Vince Carter (23)	Antonio Davis (11)	Vince Carter (9)	Philips Arena; 19,499	41–34
76	April 8	@ Chicago	W 98–79	Dee Brown, Tracy McGrady (19)	Charles Oakley (7)	Muggsy Bogues (8)	United Center; 22,137	42–34
77	April 10	Cleveland	W 112–103	Vince Carter (31)	Vince Carter (11)	Vince Carter (10)	Air Canada Centre; 19,800	43–34
78	April 12	@ Indiana	L 73–77	Vince Carter (28)	Tracy McGrady (14)	Tracy McGrady (8)	Conseco Fieldhouse; 18,345	43–35
79	April 14	New York	W 86–71	Vince Carter (34)	Tracy McGrady (9)	Muggsy Bogues, Vince Carter (6)	Air Canada Centre; 19,800	44–35
80	April 16	Chicago	W 85–84	Vince Carter (25)	Antonio Davis (9)	Tracy McGrady (5)	Air Canada Centre; 19,800	45–35
81	April 18	@ Miami	L 73–97	Vince Carter (17)	Charles Oakley (9)	Doug Christie (4)	American Airlines Arena; 19,710	45–36
82	April 19	@ Orlando	L 100–106	Antonio Davis, Tracy McGrady (14)	Michael Stewart (11)	Doug Christie (5)	TD Waterhouse Centre; 16,545	45–37

1999–00 season schedule

== Playoffs ==
=== Game log ===
2000 playoff game log
First Round: 0–3 (home: 0–1; road: 0–2)

Game	Date	Team	Score	High points	High rebounds	High assists	Location Attendance	Record
1	April 23	@ New York	L 88–92	Tracy McGrady (25)	Kevin Willis (11)	Carter, Oakley (6)	Madison Square Garden; 19,763	0–1
2	April 26	@ New York	L 83–84	Vince Carter (27)	Kevin Willis (10)	Vince Carter (5)	Madison Square Garden; 19,763	0–2
3	April 30	New York	L 80–87	Antonio Davis (18)	Charles Oakley (14)	Vince Carter (8)	Air Canada Centre; 19,996	0–3

2000 schedule

== Vince Carter ==
Vince Carter was selected to an All-Star Team for the first time, and showcased his athleticism and dunking abilities in the 2000 NBA Slam Dunk Contest. He won the contest by performing an array of dunks including a 360° windmill, a between the legs, and an "elbow dunk." Though he has not competed in the dunk contest since, Carter has been voted into the Eastern Conference NBA All-Star Team starting lineup several times through fan balloting. As of 2024, Carter's 788 regular season field goals remains the Raptors franchise record.

== Player statistics ==
=== Regular season ===
Player	POS	GP	GS	MP	REB	AST	STL	BLK	PTS	MPG	RPG	APG	SPG	BPG	PPG
Vince Carter	SF	82	82	3,126	476	322	110	92	2,107	38.1	5.8	3.9	1.3	1.1	25.7
Charles Oakley	PF	80	80	2,431	540	253	102	45	548	30.4	6.8	3.2	1.3	.6	6.9
Muggsy Bogues	PG	80	5	1,731	135	299	65	4	410	21.6	1.7	3.7	.8	.1	5.1
Antonio Davis	C	79	78	2,479	696	105	38	100	910	31.4	8.8	1.3	.5	1.3	11.5
Tracy McGrady	SF	79	34	2,462	501	263	90	151	1,213	31.2	6.3	3.3	1.1	1.9	15.4
Kevin Willis	PF	79	1	1,679	482	49	36	48	604	21.3	6.1	.6	.5	.6	7.6
Doug Christie	SG	73	73	2,264	285	321	102	43	903	31.0	3.9	4.4	1.4	.6	12.4
Dell Curry	SG	67	9	1,095	100	89	32	9	507	16.3	1.5	1.3	.5	.1	7.6
Alvin Williams	PG	55	28	779	85	126	34	11	292	14.2	1.5	2.3	.6	.2	5.3
John Thomas	C	55	6	477	75	9	12	14	114	8.7	1.4	.2	.2	.3	2.1
Michael Stewart	C	42	1	389	94	6	5	19	58	9.3	2.2	.1	.1	.5	1.4
Dee Brown	PG	38	12	673	54	86	24	5	264	17.7	1.4	2.3	.6	.1	6.9
Haywoode Workman^{†}	PG	13	1	102	9	17	9	0	20	7.8	.7	1.3	.7	.0	1.5
Antonio Lang^{†}	SF	7	0	32	5	1	4	1	3	4.6	.7	.1	.6	.1	.4
Sean Marks	PF	5	0	12	2	0	1	1	8	2.4	.4	.0	.2	.2	1.6
Aleksandar Radojević	C	3	0	24	8	1	2	1	7	8.0	2.7	.3	.7	.3	2.3

- ^{†} Denotes player spent time with another team in the season. Stats reflect time with the Raptors only.

=== Playoffs ===
Player	POS	GP	GS	MP	REB	AST	STL	BLK	PTS	MPG	RPG	APG	SPG	BPG	PPG
Vince Carter	SF	3	3	119	18	19	3	4	58	39.7	6.0	6.3	1.0	1.3	19.3
Tracy McGrady	SF	3	3	111	21	9	3	3	50	37.0	7.0	3.0	1.0	1.0	16.7
Charles Oakley	PF	3	3	110	23	11	6	1	30	36.7	7.7	3.7	2.0	.3	10.0
Antonio Davis	C	3	3	105	25	3	1	4	39	35.0	8.3	1.0	.3	1.3	13.0
Muggsy Bogues	PG	3	2	87	6	5	4	0	16	29.0	2.0	1.7	1.3	.0	5.3
Doug Christie	SG	3	1	61	5	6	4	1	12	20.3	1.7	2.0	1.3	.3	4.0
Kevin Willis	PF	3	0	76	26	1	2	0	39	25.3	8.7	.3	.7	.0	13.0
Dell Curry	SG	3	0	30	2	1	2	0	7	10.0	.7	.3	.7	.0	2.3
Dee Brown	PG	3	0	19	2	2	2	0	0	6.3	.7	.7	.7	.0	.0
John Thomas	C	1	0	1	0	0	0	0	0	1.0	.0	.0	.0	.0	.0
Alvin Williams	PG	1	0	1	0	0	0	0	0	1.0	.0	.0	.0	.0	.0

== Award winners ==
- Vince Carter, Slam Dunk Champion
- Vince Carter, All-NBA Third Team
