= 1999–2000 Atlanta Hawks season =

NBA professional basketball team season

- Head coach: Lenny Wilkens
- Arena: Philips Arena

Results
- Record: 28–54 (.341)
- Place: Division: 7th (Central); Conference: 14th (Eastern)
- Playoff finish: Did not qualify
- Stats at Basketball Reference

Local media
- Television: WHOT-TV; Fox Sports Net South; Turner South
- Radio: WCNN

The 1999–2000 Atlanta Hawks season was the 51st season for the Atlanta Hawks in the National Basketball Association, and their 32nd season in Atlanta, Georgia.

== Season summary ==
=== Off-season ===
After two seasons of splitting their home games between the Georgia Dome, and the Alexander Memorial Coliseum, the Hawks moved into their new arena known as the Philips Arena; it was built over the site of the Omni Coliseum.

The Hawks had four first-round draft picks in the 1999 NBA draft, selecting point guard Jason Terry from the University of Arizona with the tenth overall pick, which was acquired from the Golden State Warriors via trade. The team also selected power forward Cal Bowdler out of Old Dominion University with the 17th overall pick, selected shooting guard Dion Glover out of Georgia Tech University with the 20th overall pick, and selected small forward Jumaine Jones from the University of Georgia with the 27th overall pick, but soon traded him to the Philadelphia 76ers in exchange for a future draft pick. During the off-season, the team acquired Isaiah Rider and Jim Jackson from the Portland Trail Blazers, acquired Bimbo Coles and former Hawks forward Duane Ferrell from the Golden State Warriors, and acquired Lorenzen Wright from the Los Angeles Clippers. However, Ferrell was released to free agency.

For the season, the Hawks redesigned their home and road uniforms, removing their primary logo of a hawk from the front of their jerseys, and adding side panels to their jerseys and shorts; the left leg of their shorts featured the jersey number, while the right leg featured their primary logo. The white home uniforms featured a red, yellow and black trim, and red side panels with yellow and black outlines, while the road uniforms were changed from their previous black-to-red fade gradient to red, and featured a white, yellow and black trim, and white side panels.

The team's new home and road uniforms would both remain in use until 2007, although in 2002, the jersey number would be replaced with the team's primary logo on the left leg of their shorts; in 2004, the white trim color would be changed to red on their road uniforms.

=== Regular season ===
With the addition of Rider, Jackson, Coles, Terry and Wright, the Hawks lost six of their first seven games of the regular season, but soon posted a five-game winning streak between November and December, leading to a 9–9 start to the season. However, the team struggled and fell below .500 in winning percentage, losing 11 of their next 13 games, and later on holding a 19–28 record at the All-Star break. Rider led the Hawks in scoring averaging 19.3 points and 3.7 assists per game, but had a history of behavioral problems both on and off the court. After showing up late for a game in March, he was released to free agency after 60 games, while Anthony Johnson was traded to the Orlando Magic in exchange for a future draft pick at mid-season; Rider would later on sign with the Los Angeles Lakers during the following off-season. The Hawks struggled posting a nine-game losing streak in April, and finished in seventh place in the Central Division with a disappointing 28–54 record, missing the NBA playoffs for the first time since the 1991–92 season.

Jackson averaged 16.7 points and 5.0 rebounds per game, and led the Hawks with 117 three-point field goals, while Alan Henderson averaged 13.2 points and 7.0 rebounds per game, and Dikembe Mutombo provided the team with 11.5 points, 14.1 rebounds and 3.3 blocks per game. In addition, LaPhonso Ellis provided with 8.4 points and 5.0 rebounds per game, but only played 58 games due to a calf injury, while Coles contributed 8.1 points and 3.6 assists per game, and Terry contributed 8.1 points and 4.3 assists per game, and was named to the NBA All-Rookie Second Team. Meanwhile, second-year forward Roshown McLeod contributed 7.2 points per game, but only played just 44 games due to injury, and Wright averaged 6.0 points and 4.1 rebounds per game off the bench.

During the NBA All-Star weekend at The Arena in Oakland in Oakland, California, Mutombo was selected for the 2000 NBA All-Star Game, as a member of the Eastern Conference All-Star team; he also finished tied in third place in Defensive Player of the Year voting. The Hawks finished 25th in the NBA in home-game attendance, with an attendance of 600,954 at the Philips Arena during the regular season, which was the fifth-lowest in the league.

=== Aftermath ===
This was also Mutombo's final full season with the Hawks, as he would later on be traded to the Philadelphia 76ers midway through the following season. Meanwhile, head coach Lenny Wilkens resigned after seven seasons with the Hawks, and left to take a coaching job with the Toronto Raptors, while Coles signed as a free agent with the Cleveland Cavaliers, and Ellis signed with the Minnesota Timberwolves.

== Draft picks ==
Round	Pick	Player	Position	Nationality	College
1	10	Jason Terry	PG/SG	United States	Arizona
1	17	Cal Bowdler	PF/C	United States	Old Dominion
1	20	Dion Glover	SG	United States	Georgia Tech
1	27	Jumaine Jones	SF	United States	Georgia

== Roster ==
1999–2000 Atlanta Hawks roster
Players

Pos.	No.	Player	Height	Weight	DOB	From
G	10	Drew Barry	6 ft 5 in (1.96 m)	191 lb (87 kg)	1973–02–17	Georgia Tech
F	3	Cal Bowdler	6 ft 10 in (2.08 m)	245 lb (111 kg)	1977–03–31	Old Dominion
G	12	Bimbo Coles	6 ft 1 in (1.85 m)	188 lb (85 kg)	1968–04–22	Virginia Tech
F	4	Chris Crawford	6 ft 9 in (2.06 m)	235 lb (107 kg)	1975–05–13	Marquette
F	20	LaPhonso Ellis	6 ft 8 in (2.03 m)	240 lb (109 kg)	1970–05–05	Notre Dame
G	5	Dion Glover	6 ft 5 in (1.96 m)	225 lb (102 kg)	1978–10–22	Georgia Tech
F	44	Alan Henderson	6 ft 9 in (2.06 m)	235 lb (107 kg)	1972–12–02	Indiana
G/F	22	Jim Jackson	6 ft 6 in (1.98 m)	220 lb (100 kg)	1970–10–14	Ohio State
F	7	Roshown McLeod	6 ft 8 in (2.03 m)	221 lb (100 kg)	1975–11–17	Duke
C	55	Dikembe Mutombo	7 ft 2 in (2.18 m)	260 lb (118 kg)	1966–06–25	Georgetown
G	31	Jason Terry	6 ft 2 in (1.88 m)	185 lb (84 kg)	1977–09–15	Arizona
F/C	42	Lorenzen Wright	6 ft 11 in (2.11 m)	255 lb (116 kg)	1975–11–04	Memphis

Coaches
Head coach
- Lenny Wilkens
Assistant(s)
- Stan Albeck
- Phil Hubbard
- Gary Wortman

Legend
- (DP) Unsigned draft pick
- (FA) Free agent
- (S) Suspended
- Injured

Roster

=== Roster Notes ===
- Shooting guard Isaiah Rider was waived on March 17, 2000.

== Regular season ==
=== Season standings ===
Central Division	W	L	PCT	GB	Home	Road	Div
y-Indiana Pacers	56	26	.683	–	36–5	20–21	20–8
x-Charlotte Hornets	49	33	.598	7	30–11	19–22	20–8
x-Toronto Raptors	45	37	.549	11	26–15	19–22	16–12
x-Detroit Pistons	42	40	.512	14	27–14	15–26	16–12
x-Milwaukee Bucks	42	40	.512	14	23–18	19–22	16–12
Cleveland Cavaliers	32	50	.390	24	22–19	10–31	8–20
Atlanta Hawks	28	54	.341	28	21–20	7–34	11–17
Chicago Bulls	17	65	.207	39	12–29	5–36	5–23

#	Eastern Conference				
#	Team	W	L	PCT	GB
1	c-Indiana Pacers	56	26	.683	–
2	y-Miami Heat	52	30	.634	4
3	x-New York Knicks	50	32	.610	6
4	x-Charlotte Hornets	49	33	.598	7
5	x-Philadelphia 76ers	49	33	.598	7
6	x-Toronto Raptors	45	37	.549	11
7	x-Detroit Pistons	42	40	.512	14
8	x-Milwaukee Bucks	42	40	.512	14
9	Orlando Magic	41	41	.500	15
10	Boston Celtics	35	47	.427	21
11	Cleveland Cavaliers	32	50	.390	24
12	New Jersey Nets	31	51	.378	25
13	Washington Wizards	29	53	.354	27
14	Atlanta Hawks	28	54	.341	28
15	Chicago Bulls	17	65	.207	39

z - clinched division title
y - clinched division title
x - clinched playoff spot

== Player statistics ==
Legend
GP	Games played	GS	Games started	MPG	Minutes per game
FG%	Field-goal percentage	3P%	3-point field-goal percentage	FT%	Free-throw percentage
RPG	Rebounds per game	APG	Assists per game	SPG	Steals per game
BPG	Blocks per game	PPG	Points per game

=== Season ===
Player	GP	GS	MPG	FG%	3P%	FT%	RPG	APG	SPG	BPG	PPG
Drew Barry	8	0	9.3	.400	.444	1.000	.5	2.0	.0	.0	2.4
Cal Bowdler	46	0	9.2	.426	.000	.632	1.8	.3	.3	.2	2.7
Bimbo Coles	80	54	24.1	.455	.205	.817	2.2	3.6	.7	.1	8.1
Chris Crawford	55	11	12.1	.397	.259	.778	1.8	.6	.3	.3	4.6
LaPhonso Ellis	58	8	22.6	.450	.143	.695	5.0	1.0	.6	.4	8.4
Dion Glover	30	1	14.9	.386	.267	.729	1.3	.9	.5	.1	6.5
Alan Henderson	82	82	33.8	.461	.100	.671	7.0	.9	1.0	.7	13.2
Jim Jackson	79	76	35.0	.411	.386	.877	5.0	2.9	.7	.1	16.7
Anthony Johnson	38	2	11.1	.350	.167	.792	1.0	1.6	.6	.1	2.4
Roshown McLeod	44	20	19.5	.395	.154	.771	3.1	1.2	.4	.1	7.2
Dikembe Mutombo	82	82	36.4	.562	.	.708	14.1	1.3	.3	3.3	11.5
Isaiah Rider	60	47	34.7	.419	.311	.785	4.3	3.7	.7	.1	19.3
Jason Terry	81	27	23.3	.415	.293	.807	2.0	4.3	1.1	.1	8.1
Lorenzen Wright	75	0	16.1	.499	.333	.644	4.1	.3	.4	.5	6.0

Player statistics citation:

== Awards and records ==
- Jason Terry, NBA All-Rookie Team 2nd Team

== Transactions ==
=== Trades ===
June 23, 1999

- Traded Mookie Blaylock and a 1999 first round draft pick to the Golden State Warriors for Bimbo Coles, Duane Ferrell and a 1999 first round draft pick.

June 30, 1999

- Traded Jumaine Jones to the Philadelphia 76ers for a 2000 first round draft pick.

August 2, 1999

- Traded Ed Gray and Steve Smith to the Portland Trail Blazers for Jim Jackson and Isaiah Rider.

August 8, 1999

- Traded a 2000 first round draft pick, and a 2002 first round draft pick to the Los Angeles Clippers for Lorenzen Wright.

February 24, 2000

- Traded Anthony Johnson to the Orlando Magic for a 2004 second round draft pick.

=== Free agents ===
August 16, 1999

- Waived Duane Ferrell.
- Waived Tyrone Corbin.

March 20, 2000

- Waived Isaiah Rider.

March 27, 2000

- Signed Drew Barry to a contract for the rest of the season.

Player transactions citation:
