= 1999–2000 Milwaukee Bucks season =

NBA professional basketball team season

- Head coach: George Karl
- General manager: Ernie Grunfeld
- Owner: Herb Kohl
- Arena: Bradley Center

Results
- Record: 42–40 (.512)
- Place: Division: 5th (Central); Conference: 8th (Eastern)
- Playoff finish: First round (lost to Pacers 2–3)
- Stats at Basketball Reference

Local media
- Television: WCGV-TV; Midwest Sports Channel (Jim Paschke, Jon McGlocklin)
- Radio: WTMJ

The 1999–2000 Milwaukee Bucks season was the 32nd season for the Milwaukee Bucks in the National Basketball Association.

== Season summary ==
=== Off-season ===
During the off-season, the team acquired Danny Manning and re-acquired Dale Ellis from the Orlando Magic, and signed free agents Darvin Ham and J.R. Reid.

=== Regular season ===
With Sam Cassell playing a full season after dealing with an ankle injury the previous season, the Bucks got off to a 14–10 start to the regular season, and later on held a 26–24 record at the All-Star break. At mid-season, the team traded Ellis to the Charlotte Hornets, while Haywoode Workman was released to free agency, and signed with the Toronto Raptors. The Bucks struggled losing nine of their twelve games in February, as the team fell below .500 in winning percentage, and later on held a 32–37 record as of March 24, 2000. However, the Bucks managed to win 10 of their final 13 games of the season, finishing in fifth place in the Central Division with a 42–40 record, and earning the eighth seed in the Eastern Conference.

Ray Allen averaged 22.1 points, 3.8 assists and 1.3 steals per game, and led the Bucks with 172 three-point field goals, while Glenn Robinson averaged 20.9 points and 6.0 rebounds per game, and Cassell provided the team with 18.2 points, 9.0 assists and 1.3 steals per game. In addition, Tim Thomas played a sixth man role off the bench, averaging 11.8 points and 4.2 rebounds per game, while Scott Williams provided with 7.6 points and 6.6 rebounds per game, and Vinny Del Negro contributed 5.2 points per game. Meanwhile, Ham averaged 5.1 points and 4.9 rebounds per game, but only played just 35 games, Ervin Johnson averaged 4.8 points, 8.1 rebounds and 1.6 blocks per game, Manning contributed 4.6 points and 2.9 rebounds per game, and Reid provided with 4.4 points and 3.4 rebounds per game, but only appeared in just 34 games.

During the NBA All-Star weekend at The Arena in Oakland in Oakland, California, Allen and Robinson were both selected for the 2000 NBA All-Star Game, as members of the Eastern Conference All-Star team; it was the first ever All-Star appearance for both players. In addition, Allen also participated in the NBA Three-Point Shootout. The Bucks finished 19th in the NBA in home-game attendance, with an attendance of 628,605 at the Bradley Center during the regular season.

=== NBA playoffs ===
In the Eastern Conference First Round of the 2000 NBA playoffs, and for the second consecutive year, the Bucks faced off against the top–seeded, and Central Division champion Indiana Pacers, who were led by Most Improved Player of the Year, Jalen Rose, All-Star guard Reggie Miller, and All-Star forward Dale Davis. After trailing 2–1 in the series, the Bucks won Game 4 over the Pacers at home, 100–87 at the Bradley Center to even the series. However, the Bucks lost Game 5 to the Pacers on the road, 96–95 at the Conseco Fieldhouse, thus losing in a hard-fought five-game series.

The Pacers would advance to the NBA Finals for the first time in franchise history, but would lose to the Los Angeles Lakers in six games in the 2000 NBA Finals.

=== Aftermath ===
Following the season, Manning signed as a free agent with the Utah Jazz, while in a three-team trade, Del Negro was traded to the Golden State Warriors, and Reid and second-year forward Robert Traylor were both dealt to the Cleveland Cavaliers.

== Draft picks ==
Round	Pick	Player	Position	Nationality	College
2	48	Galen Young	G	United States	North Carolina-Charlotte

== Roster ==
1999–2000 Milwaukee Bucks roster
Players

Pos.	No.	Player	Height	Weight	DOB	From
G	34	Ray Allen	6 ft 5 in (1.96 m)	205 lb (93 kg)	1975–07–20	Connecticut
G	11	Rafer Alston	6 ft 2 in (1.88 m)	190 lb (86 kg)	1976–07–24	Fresno State
F	—	Maceo Baston (IN)	6 ft 9 in (2.06 m)	215 lb (98 kg)	1976–05–29	Michigan
G	10	Sam Cassell	6 ft 3 in (1.91 m)	185 lb (84 kg)	1969–11–18	Florida State
G	15	Vinny Del Negro	6 ft 4 in (1.93 m)	189 lb (86 kg)	1966–08–09	NC State
F	21	Darvin Ham	6 ft 7 in (2.01 m)	240 lb (109 kg)	1973–07–23	Texas Tech
C	40	Ervin Johnson	6 ft 11 in (2.11 m)	245 lb (111 kg)	1967–12–21	LSU New Orleans
F/C	25	Danny Manning	6 ft 10 in (2.08 m)	230 lb (104 kg)	1966–05–17	Kansas
F/C	7	J. R. Reid	6 ft 9 in (2.06 m)	247 lb (112 kg)	1968–03–31	North Carolina
F	13	Glenn Robinson	6 ft 7 in (2.01 m)	240 lb (109 kg)	1973–01–10	Purdue
F	5	Tim Thomas	6 ft 10 in (2.08 m)	240 lb (109 kg)	1977–02–26	Villanova
F/C	54	Robert Traylor	6 ft 8 in (2.03 m)	290 lb (132 kg)	1977–02–01	Michigan
F	6	Mirsad Turkcan	6 ft 9 in (2.06 m)	250 lb (113 kg)	1976–06–07	Turkey
F/C	42	Scott Williams	6 ft 10 in (2.08 m)	230 lb (104 kg)	1968–03–21	North Carolina

Coaches
Head coach
- George Karl
Assistant(s)
- Ron Adams
- Mike McNeive
- Don Newman
- Terry Stotts
- Mike Thibault

Legend
- (DP) Unsigned draft pick
- (FA) Free agent
- (S) Suspended
- (IN) Inactive
- Injured

Roster

=== Roster Notes ===
- Forward Maceo Baston was signed by the Bucks at the end of the regular season, but did not play for them.

== Regular season ==
=== Season standings ===
Central Division	W	L	PCT	GB	Home	Road	Div
y-Indiana Pacers	56	26	.683	–	36–5	20–21	20–8
x-Charlotte Hornets	49	33	.598	7	30–11	19–22	20–8
x-Toronto Raptors	45	37	.549	11	26–15	19–22	16–12
x-Detroit Pistons	42	40	.512	14	27–14	15–26	16–12
x-Milwaukee Bucks	42	40	.512	14	23–18	19–22	16–12
Cleveland Cavaliers	32	50	.390	24	22–19	10–31	8–20
Atlanta Hawks	28	54	.341	28	21–20	7–34	11–17
Chicago Bulls	17	65	.207	39	12–29	5–36	5–23

#	Eastern Conference				
#	Team	W	L	PCT	GB
1	c-Indiana Pacers	56	26	.683	–
2	y-Miami Heat	52	30	.634	4
3	x-New York Knicks	50	32	.610	6
4	x-Charlotte Hornets	49	33	.598	7
5	x-Philadelphia 76ers	49	33	.598	7
6	x-Toronto Raptors	45	37	.549	11
7	x-Detroit Pistons	42	40	.512	14
8	x-Milwaukee Bucks	42	40	.512	14
9	Orlando Magic	41	41	.500	15
10	Boston Celtics	35	47	.427	21
11	Cleveland Cavaliers	32	50	.390	24
12	New Jersey Nets	31	51	.378	25
13	Washington Wizards	29	53	.354	27
14	Atlanta Hawks	28	54	.341	28
15	Chicago Bulls	17	65	.207	39

z – clinched division title
y – clinched division title
x – clinched playoff spot

=== Game log ===
1999–2000 game log
Total: 42–40 (home: 0–0; road: 0–0)
November: 8–6 (home: 5–2; road: 3–4)

Game	Date	Team	Score	High points	High rebounds	High assists	Location Attendance	Record
1	November 2, 1999	@ Houston	W 98—93	Sam Cassell (35)			Compaq Center; 14,491	1–0
2	November 4, 1999	@ Atlanta	W 119—109	Ray Allen (31)			Philips Arena; 18,514	2–0
3	November 6, 1999	Detroit	W 121–111	Sam Cassell (28)			Bradley Center; 18,374	3–0
4	November 8, 1999	@ New York	L 101–111				Madison Square Garden; 19,763	3–1
5	November 10, 1999	@ Charlotte	L 111—117				Charlotte Coliseum; 15,769	3–2
6	November 12, 1999	Phoenix	W 107–92	Glenn Robinson (27)	Glenn Robinson (12)	Sam Cassell (14)	Bradley Center; 16,137	4–2
7	November 13, 1999	@ Cleveland	L 112—117				Gund Arena; 18,640	4–3
8	November 16, 1999	L. A. Clippers	W 121–111	Glenn Robinson (24)	Glenn Robinson (10)	Sam Cassell (9)	Bradley Center; 12,465	5–3
9	November 18, 1999	San Antonio	W 99–88	Ray Allen (26)	Ray Allen, Ervin Johnson (8)	Glenn Robinson (4)	Bradley Center; 15,184	6–3
10	November 20, 1999	Utah	L 100–111	Ray Allen (23)	Glenn Robinson (8)	Sam Cassell (9)	Bradley Center; 18,027	6–4
11	November 21, 1999	@ Detroit	L 94—113				The Palace of Auburn Hills; 13,163	6–5
12	November 24, 1999	Chicago	W 102–95				Bradley Center; 14,209	7–5
13	November 26, 1999	@ Boston	W 114—112				Fleet Center; 18,027	8–5
14	November 2, 1999	Philadelphia	L 79–82				Bradley Center; 15,216	8–6

December: 9–7 (home: 4–3; road: 5–4)

Game	Date	Team	Score	High points	High rebounds	High assists	Location Attendance	Record
15	December 2, 1999	New York	L 80–84				Bradley Center; 14,365	8–7
16	December 4, 1999	@ Chicago	W 92—91				United Center; 22,188	9–7
17	December 5, 1999	Dallas	W 103–97				Bradley Center; 12,214	10–7
18	December 7, 1999	Detroit	L 112–116				Bradley Center; 12,847	10–8
19	December 8, 1999	@ New Jersey	L 98—107				Continental Airlines Arena; 12,366	10–9
20	December 10, 1999	@ Toronto	W 107—91				Air Canada Centre; 17,963	11–9
21	December 11, 1999	Denver	L 99–101				Bradley Center; 15,862	11–9
22	December 15, 1999	@ Orlando	W 116—99				Orlando Arena; 12,308	12–10
23	December 16, 1999	@ Miami	W 96—95				Miami Arena; 14,503	13–10
24	December 18, 1999	Indiana	W 109–95				Bradley Center; 15,236	14–10
25	December 20, 1999	@ Phoenix	L 101—108				America West Arena; 18,656	14–11
26	December 21, 1999	@ Sacramento	L 95—108				ARCO Arena; 17,317	14–12
27	December 23, 1999	@ San Antonio	W 94—91				Alamodome; 22,581	15–12
28	December 26, 1999	Miami	W 93–85				Bradley Center; 15,075	16–12
29	December 29, 1999	@ Charlotte	L 105—109				Charlotte Coliseum; 17,134	16–13
30	December 30, 1999	Cleveland	W 91–90				Bradley Center; 16,329	17–13

January: 6–6 (home: 5–2; road: 1–4)

Game	Date	Team	Score	High points	High rebounds	High assists	Location Attendance	Record
31	January 3, 2000	@ Philadelphia	L 120—124 OT				First Union Center; 14,886	17–14
32	January 4, 2000	Atlanta	W 116–113				Bradley Center; 12,739	18–14
33	January 6, 2000	@ Detroit	L 95—101				The Palace of Auburn Hills; 14,233	18–15
34	January 8, 2000	Washington	W 130–129 2OT				Bradley Center; 15,612	19–15
35	January 10, 2000	Charlotte	W 137–87				Bradley Center; 13,159	20–15
36	January 12, 2000	L. A. Lakers	L 94–103				Bradley Center; 18,717	20–16
37	January 14, 2000	@ Toronto	L 110—115				Air Canada Centre; 19,246	20–17
38	January 15, 2000	Toronto	W 118–97				Bradley Center; 18,717	21–17
39	January 17, 2000	@ Atlanta	W 107—101				Philips Arena; 19,261	22–17
40	January 19, 2000	@ Indiana	L 84—106				Conseco Fieldhouse; 18,345	22–18
41	January 20, 2000	Seattle	L 96–104				Bradley Center; 14,087	22–19
42	January 26, 2000	Sacramento	W 112–104				Bradley Center; 16,931	23–19

February: 0–0 (home: 0–0; road: 0–0)

Game	Date	Team	Score	High points	High rebounds	High assists	Location Attendance	Record

March: 0–0 (home: 0–0; road: 0–0)

Game	Date	Team	Score	High points	High rebounds	High assists	Location Attendance	Record

April: 0–0 (home: 0–0; road: 0–0)

Game	Date	Team	Score	High points	High rebounds	High assists	Location Attendance	Record

1999–00 schedule

== Playoffs ==
2000 playoff game log
First Round: 2–3 (home: 1–1; road: 1–2)

Game	Date	Team	Score	High points	High rebounds	High assists	Location Attendance	Series
1	April 23	@ Indiana	L 85–88	Ray Allen (26)	Ham, Johnson (8)	Sam Cassell (6)	Conseco Fieldhouse; 18,345	0–1
2	April 27	@ Indiana	W 104–91	Allen, Cassell (20)	Ervin Johnson (12)	Sam Cassell (8)	Conseco Fieldhouse; 18,345	1–1
3	April 29	Indiana	L 96–109	Allen, Robinson (26)	Ervin Johnson (13)	Sam Cassell (12)	Bradley Center; 18,717	1–2
4	May 1	Indiana	W 100–87	Allen, Williams (20)	Ervin Johnson (9)	Sam Cassell (13)	Bradley Center; 18,072	2–2
5	May 4	@ Indiana	L 95–96	Sam Cassell (22)	Tim Thomas (9)	Sam Cassell (6)	Conseco Fieldhouse; 18,345	2–3

2000 schedule

== Player statistics ==
Legend
GP	Games played	GS	Games started	MPG	Minutes per game
FG%	Field-goal percentage	3P%	3-point field-goal percentage	FT%	Free-throw percentage
RPG	Rebounds per game	APG	Assists per game	SPG	Steals per game
BPG	Blocks per game	PPG	Points per game

=== Season ===
Player	GP	GS	MPG	FG%	3FG%	FT%	RPG	APG	SPG	BPG	PPG
Ray Allen	82	82	37.4	45.5	42.3	88.7	4.4	3.8	1.3	0.2	22.1
Glenn Robinson	81	81	35.9	47.2	36.3	80.2	6.0	2.4	1.0	0.5	20.9
Sam Cassell	81	81	35.8	46.6	28.9	87.6	3.7	9.0	1.3	0.1	18.6
Tim Thomas	80	1	26.2	46.1	34.6	77.4	4.2	1.4	0.7	0.4	11.8
Scott Williams	68	46	21.9	50.0	0.0	72.9	6.6	0.4	0.6	1.0	7.6
Dale Ellis	18	0	18.0	46.5	35.4	66.7	1.9	0.3	0.3	0.0	6.8
Vinny Del Negro	67	0	18.1	47.1	33.3	89.7	1.6	2.4	0.5	0.0	5.2
Darvin Ham	35	21	22.6	55.5	0.0	44.9	4.9	1.2	0.8	0.8	5.1
Ervin Johnson	80	74	26.6	51.6	0.0	60.5	8.1	0.6	1.0	1.6	4.8
Danny Manning	72	0	16.9	44.0	25.0	65.4	2.9	1.0	0.9	0.4	4.6
J.R. Reid	34	7	17.7	41.7	14.3	76.8	3.4	0.5	0.6	0.1	4.4
Robert Traylor	44	16	10.2	47.5	0.0	60.3	2.6	0.5	0.6	0.6	3.6
Haywoode Workman	23	1	10.8	37.1	37.9	69.2	0.7	1.9	0.5	0.0	2.9
Mirsad Turkcan	10	0	6.5	42.9	0.0	62.5	2.3	0.4	0.1	0.1	2.9
Rafer Alston	27	0	13.4	28.4	21.4	75.0	0.9	2.6	0.4	0.0	2.2

=== Playoffs ===
Player	GP	GS	MPG	FG%	3FG%	FT%	RPG	APG	SPG	BPG	PPG
Ray Allen	5	5	37.2	44.4	38.5	90.9	6.6	2.6	1.6	0.0	22.0
Sam Cassell	5	5	35.6	41.7	20.0	85.7	3.4	9.0	0.8	0.0	15.8
Glenn Robinson	5	5	34.8	40.5	28.6	84.6	4.2	2.6	1.6	0.8	15.4
Tim Thomas	5	0	28.4	49.2	33.3	82.4	4.8	2.0	0.2	0.8	15.4
Scott Williams	5	0	18.6	63.9	0.0	83.3	5.6	0.4	0.4	1.0	10.2
Ervin Johnson	5	5	31.0	50.0	0.0	61.1	9.8	0.4	1.2	1.2	6.2
Vinny Del Negro	5	0	18.6	43.3	0.0	0.0	1.6	1.8	0.6	0.0	5.2
Darvin Ham	5	5	28.8	64.7	0.0	33.3	5.8	1.4	0.2	1.6	5.0
Mirsad Turkcan	2	0	5.0	20.0	0.0	100.0	1.0	0.0	0.0	0.0	2.0
Danny Manning	1	0	5.0	0.0	0.0	0.0	1.0	0.0	0.0	0.0	0.0
Rafer Alston	4	0	4.0	0.0	0.0	0.0	0.0	0.3	0.0	0.0	0.0
Robert Traylor	1	0	4.0	0.0	0.0	0.0	2.0	1.0	0.0	1.0	0.0

Player statistics citation:

== Transactions ==
=== Trades ===
August 19, 1999
January 18, 2000
To Milwaukee Bucks----
- Dale Ellis
- Danny Manning
To Milwaukee Bucks----
- 2000 2nd round pick (Jason Hart)
To Orlando Magic----
- Chris Gatling
- Armen Gilliam
To Charlotte Hornets----
- Dale Ellis

=== Free agents ===
Player	Signed	Former team
J. R. Reid	August 20, 1999	Los Angeles Lakers
Darvin Ham	September 20, 1999	CB Granada

Player Transactions Citation:
