= Eddie Robinson (basketball) =

American basketball player (born 1976)

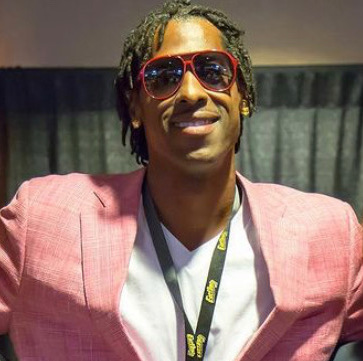
- Robinson at the NJCAA Hall of Fame ceremony in 2017

Personal information
- Born: April 19, 1976 (age 50) Flint, Michigan, U.S.
- Listed height: 6 ft 9 in (2.06 m)
- Listed weight: 210 lb (95 kg)

Career information
- High school: Flint Northern (Flint, Michigan)
- College: Trinity Valley CC (1995–1996); Brown Mackie (1996–1997); Central Oklahoma (1998–1999)
- NBA draft: 1999: undrafted
- Playing career: 1999–2012
- Position: Shooting guard / small forward
- Number: 32

Career history
- 1999–2001: Charlotte Hornets
- 2001–2004: Chicago Bulls
- 2006–2007: Idaho Stampede
- 2011–2012: Halifax Rainmen

Career highlights
- NCAA Division II leading scorer (1999)

Career statistics
- Points: 1,938
- Rebounds: 764
- Assists: 252
- Stats at NBA.com
- Stats at Basketball Reference

Eddie B. Robinson Jr. (born April 19, 1976) is an American former professional basketball player. A 6-foot-9-inch (2.06 m) shooting guard/small forward, he spent five seasons (1999–2004) in the National Basketball Association (NBA). In April 2017, Robinson was inducted into the NJCAA Hall of Fame in Las Vegas, Nevada.

== Professional career ==
=== NBA years ===
After attending the University of Central Oklahoma, Robinson signed as an undrafted free agent with the NBA's Charlotte Hornets in 1999. Known primarily for his leaping ability and athleticism, he averaged 7.2 points per game over two seasons as a reserve with the Hornets and attracted the attention of Chicago Bulls GM Jerry Krause, who felt that Robinson could become a star if given more playing time. Krause signed Robinson to a 5-year, US$30 million contract in 2001. In 2004, John Paxson, who replaced Krause as Bulls' general manager in 2003, convinced Bulls owner Jerry Reinsdorf to buy out the last two years of Robinson's contract. Robinson played his final NBA game on March 31, 2004, against the Orlando Magic.

=== D-League ===
On November 2, 2006, Robinson was selected by the Idaho Stampede with the 16th overall pick in the 2006 NBA Development League Draft. In the 2006–07 season Robinson averaged more than 15 points for the Idaho Stampede. After the season, he was released. On November 7, 2008, he was selected with the 14th pick in the fifth round of the 2008 NBA Development League Draft by the Albuquerque Thunderbirds. However, he did not come to a contract agreement.

=== NBL Canada ===
On September 19, 2011, it was announced that Robinson had signed with the Halifax Rainmen of the National Basketball League of Canada for the 2011–12 season. However, he was placed in the injured reserve November 1. He played his first game with the Rainmen against the Oshawa Power on November 27, 2011. Robinson scored 18 points during his debut. He departed the team in January 2012.

== Big3 ==
In 2017, Robinson signed with the Killer 3's in Ice Cube's Big 3 Basketball League.

== Coaching ==
As of February 2021, Robinson is a volunteer coach for the boys basketball team of Prince Andrew High School in Dartmouth, Nova Scotia.

== Personal life ==
Robinson lives in the Houston area with his wife Jillian and their two children. The couple previously lived in Halifax, Nova Scotia, where Robinson settled after playing for the Rainmen. He later became a Canadian citizen; he is a dual citizen of Canada and the United States. He splits his time between Halifax and Houston, Texas where his sisters as well as his three other children from a previous marriage live.
