= Jason Miskiri =

Guyanese basketball player

Personal information
- Born: August 19, 1975 (age 51) Georgetown, Guyana
- Listed height: 6 ft 2 in (1.88 m)
- Listed weight: 175 lb (79 kg)

Career information
- High school: Montgomery Blair (Silver Spring, Maryland)
- College: Montgomery College (1995–1997); George Mason (1997–1999)
- NBA draft: 1999: undrafted
- Playing career: 1999–2005
- Position: Point guard
- Number: 11

Career history
- 1999: Charlotte Hornets
- 2001–2002: Greenville Groove
- 2003–2004: Charleston Lowgators
- 2004–2005: Huntsville Flight
- Stats at NBA.com
- Stats at Basketball Reference

Jason Oliver Miskiri (born August 19, 1975) is a Guyanese former professional basketball player.

== Early life ==
Miskiri was born on August 19, 1975, in Georgetown, Guyana. At age 5, he moved to Maryland. He attended Montgomery Blair High School in Silver Spring, Maryland, where he played alongside future All-Star Steve Francis. Miskiri would start his college career at Montgomery College. He would attend George Mason University for his junior and senior years.

== Professional career ==
=== Charlotte Hornets (1999) ===
Miskiri went undrafted in the 1999 NBA draft. However, the Charlotte Hornets would sign him to a contract on October 4, 1999, making him the first Guyanese NBA player. Miskiri played only one game in the NBA, recording one assist and two personal fouls in three minutes. On November 8, the Hornets waived him.

=== Greenville Groove (2001-2002) ===
Miskiri played for the Greenville Groove of the NBA Development League during the 2001–02 National Basketball Development League season. In seven games with the Groove, Miskiri averaged 7.9 points per game, 2.0 rebounds per game, and 1.4 assists per game.

=== Charleston Lowgators (2003-2004) ===
Miskiri would join the Charleston Lowgators for the 2003-04 NBDL season. He played 41 games for the Lowgators, averaging 7.7 points per game, 2.1 rebounds per game, and 3.7 assists per game.

=== Huntsville Flight (2004-2005) ===
Miskiri's final stint with a professional team was with the Huntsville Flight. Playing 40 games with the Flight (and starting in 38 of them), he averaged 11.8 points per game, 2.8 rebounds per game, and 5.6 assists per game.

== Personal ==
On April 17, 2015, Miskiri pleaded guilty to conspiring to possess with intent to distribute more than 1,000 kilograms of marijuana. In December the same year, he was sentenced to two years in prison.
