= Lari Ketner =

American basketball player (1977–2014)

Personal information
- Born: February 1, 1977 Philadelphia, Pennsylvania, U.S.
- Died: October 10, 2014 (aged 37) Avon, Indiana, U.S.
- Listed height: 6 ft 10 in (2.08 m)
- Listed weight: 277 lb (126 kg)

Career information
- High school: Roman Catholic (Philadelphia, Pennsylvania)
- College: UMass (1996–1999)
- NBA draft: 1999: 2nd round, 49th overall pick
- Drafted by: Chicago Bulls
- Playing career: 1999–2004
- Position: Power forward
- Number: 6, 0, 8

Career history
- 1999: Chicago Bulls
- 1999–2000: Fort Wayne Fury
- 2000: Cleveland Cavaliers
- 2001: Indiana Pacers
- 2003–2004: Idaho Stampede

Career highlights
- First-team All-Atlantic 10 (1998)
- Stats at NBA.com
- Stats at Basketball Reference

Lari Arthur Ketner (February 1, 1977 – October 10, 2014) was an American professional basketball player. A 6-foot-9-inch (2.06 m), 277-pound (126 kg) forward/center, Ketner played college basketball for the UMass Minutemen, and was selected by the Chicago Bulls with the 49th overall pick (second round) of the 1999 NBA draft.

== Career ==
Ketner played in two National Basketball Association (NBA) seasons for three teams: Chicago Bulls (1999–2000), Cleveland Cavaliers (1999–2000) and Indiana Pacers (2000–01). He averaged 1.4 points, 1.4 rebounds, and 0.1 assists. After his brief NBA career, Lari tried a few minor league basketball teams. He played in the Continental Basketball Association (CBA) for the Fort Wayne Fury and Idaho Stampede. On January 1, 2005, while standing outside of a nightclub talking to associates, Lari was shot eight times by an unknown person, ultimately ending his basketball career. Lari later followed his passion of working with disadvantaged children by working at several group homes in his hometown of Philadelphia.

== Personal life ==
On August 28, 2013, at 36 years old, Ketner was diagnosed with Stage IV colon cancer. After being diagnosed with cancer, Ketner completed the three courses needed to receive his bachelor's degree from University of Massachusetts Amherst. He completed his final course in August 2014 and received his degree. Lari was married to Aquarius Ketner and was the father of three children and stepfather of two. He resided in Indianapolis, Indiana. He died on October 10, 2014, in Avon, Indiana, from colon cancer at age 37.
