= Carmelo K. Anthony Basketball Center =

Syracuse University basketball practice facility

Coordinates: 43.025584°N 76.127324°W

- Melo Center
- Interactive map of Carmelo K. Anthony Basketball Center
- Location: Comstock Ave & E. Colvin St; Syracuse, NY 13244
- Owner: Syracuse University
- Operator: Syracuse University

Construction
- Groundbreaking: September 26, 2007
- Opened: September 24, 2009

Tenants
- Syracuse Orange men's basketball Syracuse Orange women's basketball

The Carmelo K. Anthony Basketball Center is a college basketball practice facility located in Syracuse, New York. The facility opened September 24, 2009. Both the men's and women's basketball teams for Syracuse University use the center. The facility houses two practice courts, locker rooms and office facilities for the men's and women's basketball programs at Syracuse. It is located on the north side of Manley Field House, in between the Roy Simmons Sr. Coaches Wing and the Comstock Art Facility.

The name comes from NBA star forward Carmelo Anthony, who donated $3 million to the project. Anthony played one year with the Orange, the 2002-2003 season, in which he helped the program win its only NCAA Championship.
