= Idan Ravin =

American basketball coach

- Born: Idan Andy Ravin; December 23, 1970 (age 55); Washington, D.C., U.S.
- Education: University of Maryland (BS); California Western School of Law (JD)
- Occupations: Lawyer, trainer, and basketball coach

Idan Andy Ravin (born December 23, 1970) is an American basketball trainer. An attorney by trade, Ravin never played organized basketball beyond high school, unlike most trainers and advisors working with NBA players.

== Early life ==
Ravin was raised in Potomac, Maryland by an Israeli mother, and Russian father. After high school, Ravin attended the University of Maryland and studied finance and marketing. During his student years at Maryland, Ravin played in pick-up basketball games with college players, refining his skills. Subsequently, Ravin moved to San Diego where he attended California Western School of Law and after graduation, worked as an attorney in the San Diego area. During his time in San Diego, Ravin began coaching youth basketball games and as part of that effort, led his youth teams through a series of unconventional training sessions that improved their playing ability. After he moved back to the East Coast, he continued his efforts as a basketball coach and improved upon his drills.

== Career ==
When coaching youth basketball in 1999, Ravin's work caught the attention of Steve Francis, a native of Takoma Park, Maryland. After Francis participated in some of the training sessions, he recommended Ravin to other NBA players. Since then, Ravin has worked with some of the NBA's biggest stars including Kobe Bryant, LeBron James, Chris Paul, Kevin Durant, Amare Stoudemire, Dwight Howard, Carmelo Anthony, Stephen Curry, James Harden, and Blake Griffin. A feature of Ravin's workouts are the many distractions he creates while the players are doing ball handling drills. Examples include throwing tennis balls at players and requiring them to catch the balls as they dribble through a set of cones on a basketball court. At other times, Ravin has been known to tap players under the chin when they fail to keep their heads up as they dribble. Rarely do his workouts last longer than an hour and during the sessions Ravin is known for not raising his voice above the level of a normal conversation. As opposed to the practice of other coaches, Ravin usually asks the player if they want to run after practice, instead of making it mandatory.

Failure to understand a player's psyche is a flaw Ravin sees in the disciplinarian style of some coaches. Rather than empowering a player, they strip him of his authority. "At the end of the workout, I'll give players the option to run," explains Ravin. "I'll say, 'I think you've got more in you, but it's your choice.' They'll always run if you present the option in a fair way. And then when they're done, I'll say, 'I'm impressed with you. I think you have half a tank of gas left. I think it'd be great if you did another one.' And they'll say, 'Really?' And they'll do it. Players want to be part of the process."

— The Art of a Beautiful Game: The Thinking Fan's Tour of the NBA

Ravin has reportedly turned down multiple offers to work full-time for NBA teams. Instead, he prefers to work with players who seek him out and agree to his intense training sessions. Ravin's sports memoir, The Hoops Whisperer: On the Court and Inside the Head of Basketball's Best Players documents Ravin's journey from coaching youth teams to becoming one of basketball's most famous trainers. Published by Penguin, the book released May 1, 2014.
