= Banana Boat Team =

Hypothetical basketball superteam

"Banana Boat Team"

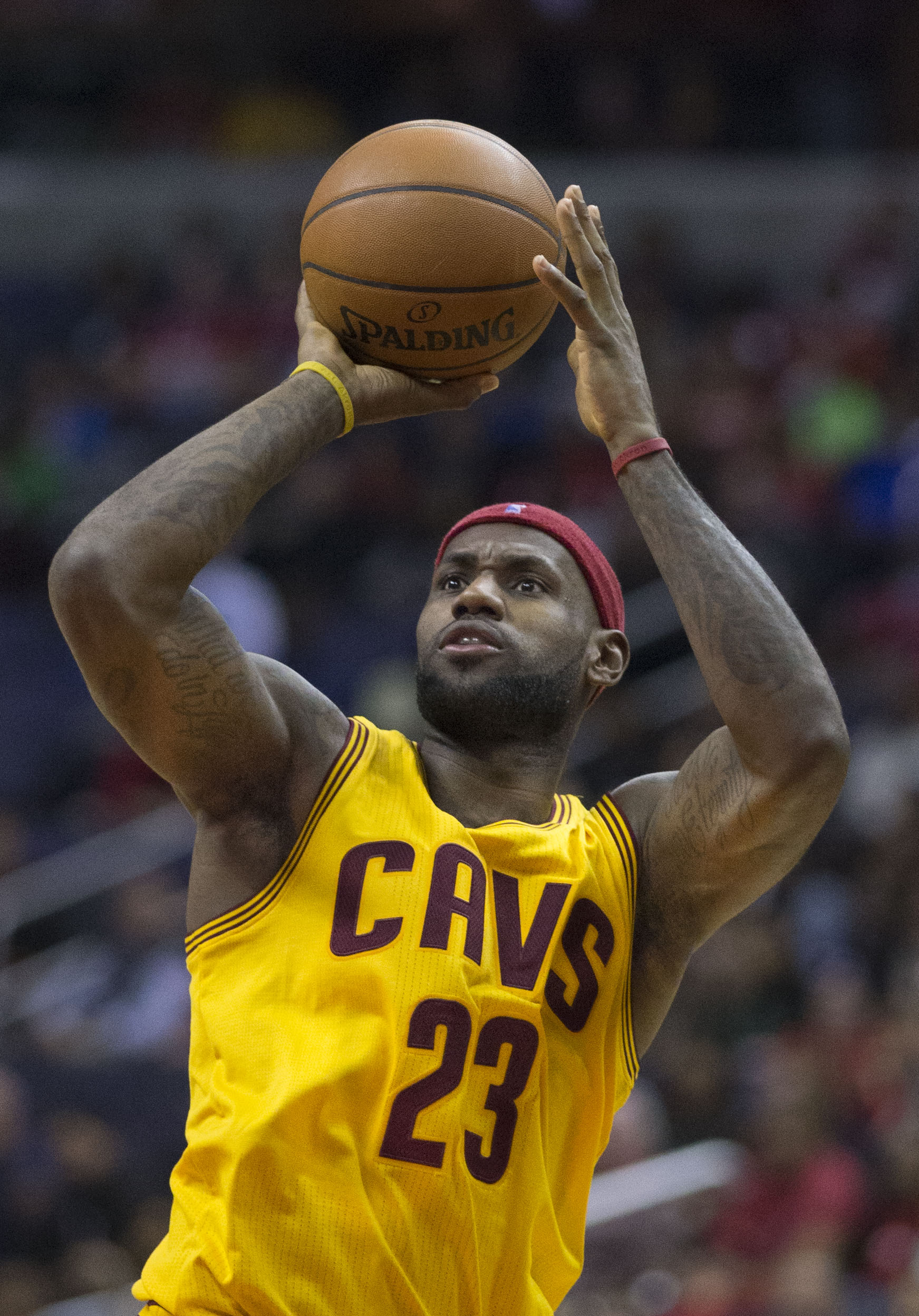
LeBron James

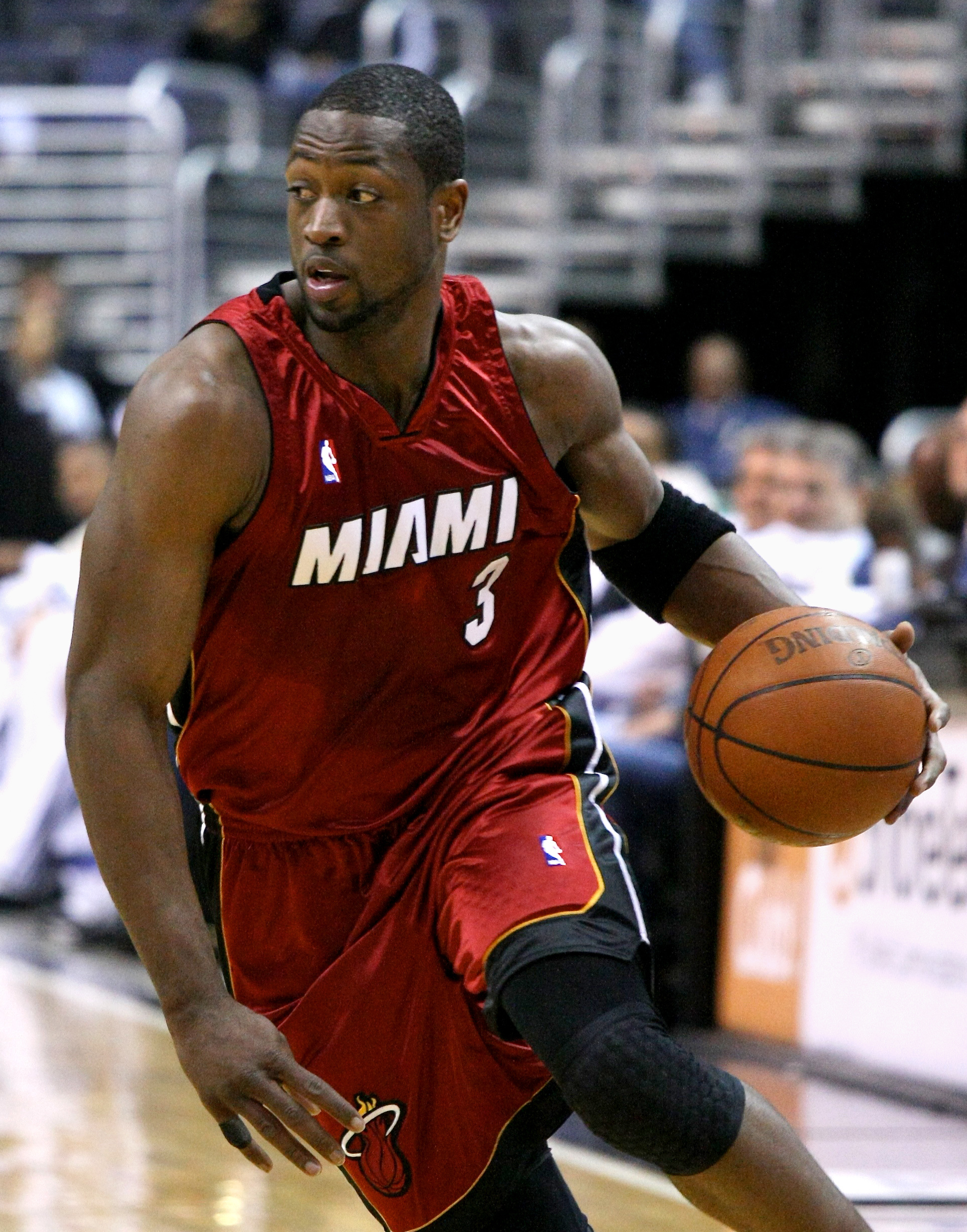
Dwyane Wade

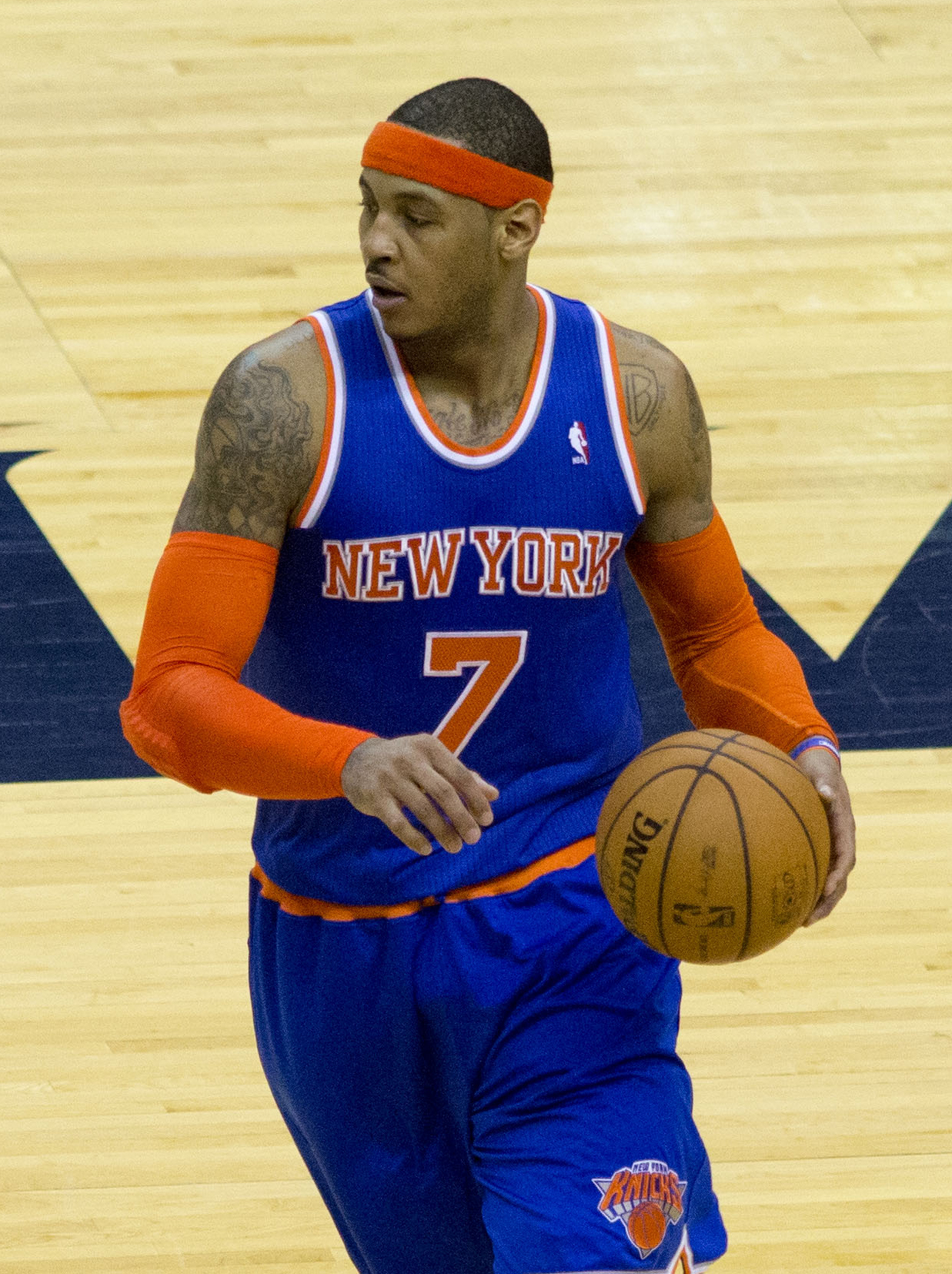
Carmelo Anthony

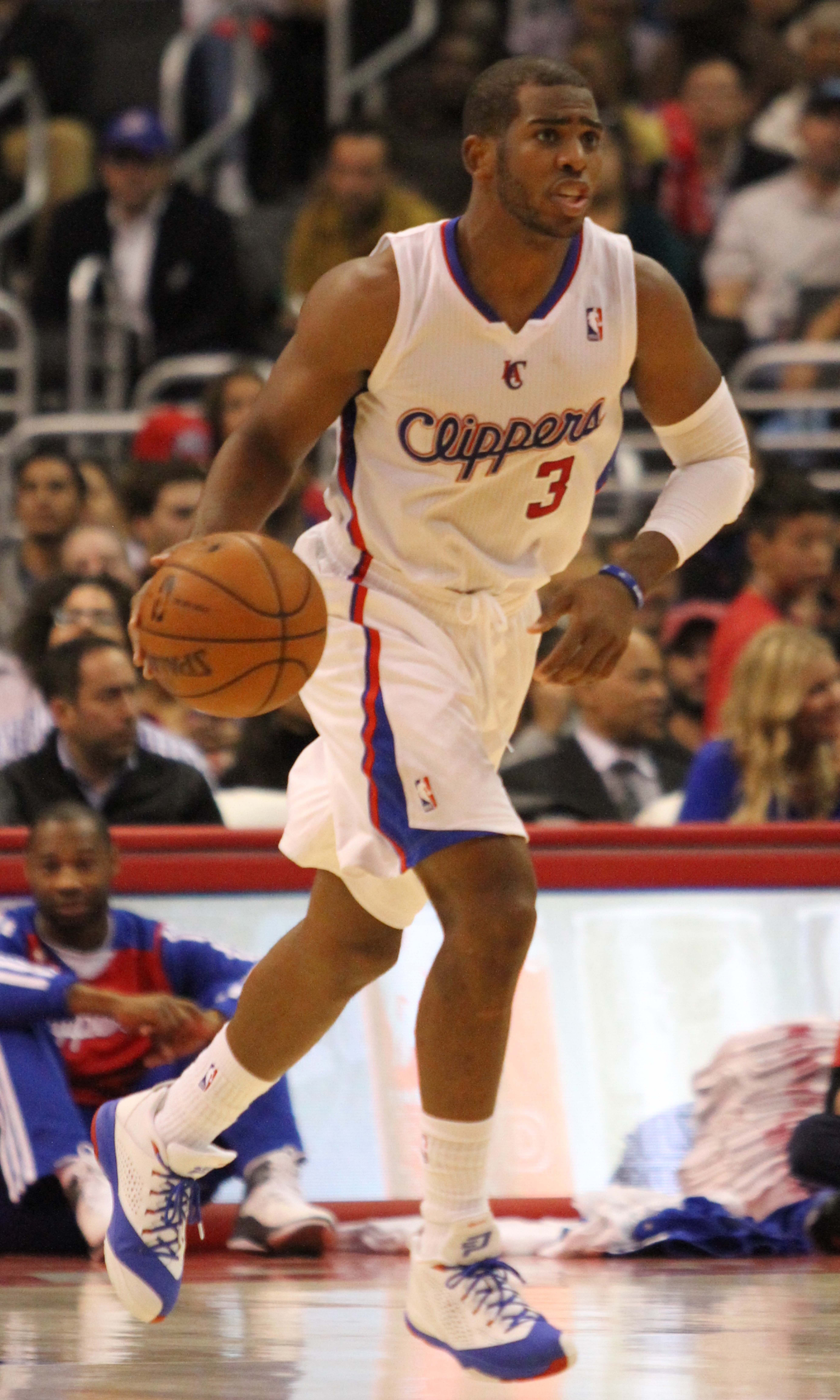
Chris Paul

The Banana Boat Team, Banana Boat Squad or Banana Boat Crew is a hypothetical pop culture NBA superteam, consisting of LeBron James, Dwyane Wade, Carmelo Anthony, and Chris Paul.

While all the players involved in the hypothetical team played on teams involving at least one of the other three players either before or after the concept was first formed in 2015, all four players never appeared together on the same NBA team roster. Anthony, Wade and Paul have since retired from playing basketball.

== History ==
The Banana Boat team concept first formed after a photo surfaced of James, Wade, Paul, and Wade's wife Gabrielle Union on vacation in 2015. Anthony, while not featured in the picture, was on vacation with them at the time, and is considered the 'fourth member' of the Banana Boat Team. The four NBA superstars have been friends since they were teenagers, and have occasionally gone on vacation together. They also played together on the 2008 Olympic Gold Medal team.

In the summer of 2010, James and Wade teamed up on the Miami Heat, with whom they won two NBA titles. Chris Bosh was also a member of this team, forming what many referred to as the "Big Three". In 2024, Wade and Paul stated that a deal was in place for Paul to be traded to the Heat alongside Wade and James, but the deal fell through after neither Paul nor Wade wanted to give up their No. 3 jersey number. Following the 2013–14 season, James rejoined the Cleveland Cavaliers.

During the 2014–15 NBA season, James was asked if he was close to any of his teammates on the Cavaliers. He responded that he only had three people he considered "very good friends" in the NBA, and named Anthony, Paul, and Wade.

In the summer of 2016, Wade posted on Snapchat that ‘The Banana Boys are reunited.' Snapchat gave the group their own "Banana Boys" Snapchat filter. That same year, the four stars were on stage during the 2016 ESPY Awards to address social injustice.

That same year, James expressed great interest in forming a superteam in Los Angeles with the Lakers. Paul also expressed interest in forming the team. James was quoted saying "I really hope that, before our career is over, we can all play together," creating many rumors of the possibility of the quartet playing together.

In the 2017 NBA offseason, Wade joined forces with James in Cleveland. Paul was traded to the Houston Rockets, and Anthony was traded to the Oklahoma City Thunder. On July 1, 2018, James signed with the Los Angeles Lakers. On July 23, Anthony agreed to join Paul on the Rockets after signing a one-year deal at the veteran's minimum of $2.4 million. After playing ten games with the Rockets, he was traded to the Chicago Bulls on January 21, 2019, who waived him shortly after. Anthony did not find a team to start the 2019–20 season but got picked up by the Portland Trail Blazers a few weeks into November. On August 4, 2021, Anthony joined LeBron's Lakers.

On February 20, 2022, all four stars posed for photos together as part of the NBA 75 celebration with the caption to an NBA official Instagram photo stating “From teens to legends, a brotherhood!” This marks the first time the NBA has officially acknowledged the group and their significance together.

Wade retired after the 2018–19 NBA season, while Anthony retired following the 2021–22 NBA season. Paul retired during the 2025–26 NBA season, leaving James as the final active member of the group. In 2023, Wade was inducted into the Naismith Basketball Hall of Fame, making him the first member of the team to be inducted. Anthony was inducted to the Hall of Fame in 2025.
