= Steve Francis =

American basketball player (born 1977)

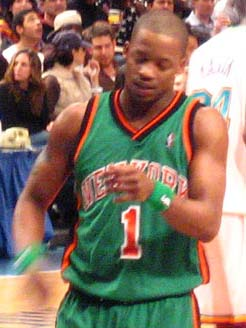
- Francis with the New York Knicks in 2007

Personal information
- Born: February 21, 1977 (age 49) Takoma Park, Maryland, U.S.
- Listed height: 6 ft 3 in (1.91 m)
- Listed weight: 210 lb (95 kg)

Career information
- High school: Montgomery Blair (Silver Spring, Maryland)
- College: San Jacinto (1996–1997); Allegany (1997–1998); Maryland (1998–1999)
- NBA draft: 1999: 1st round, 2nd overall pick
- Drafted by: Vancouver Grizzlies
- Playing career: 1999–2010
- Position: Point guard
- Number: 3, 1

Career history
- 1999–2004: Houston Rockets
- 2004–2006: Orlando Magic
- 2006–2007: New York Knicks
- 2007–2008: Houston Rockets
- 2010: Beijing Ducks

Career highlights
- 3× NBA All-Star (2002–2004); NBA Rookie of the Year (2000); NBA All-Rookie First Team (2000); Consensus second-team All-American (1999); First-team All-ACC (1999); No. 23 honored by Maryland Terrapins

Career NBA statistics
- Points: 10,446 (18.1 ppg)
- Rebounds: 3,215 (5.6 rpg)
- Assists: 3,473 (6.0 apg)
- Stats at NBA.com
- Stats at Basketball Reference

Steven D'Shawn Francis (born February 21, 1977) is an American former professional basketball player. He was selected with the second overall pick of the 1999 NBA draft and was named co-NBA Rookie of the Year (along with Elton Brand) in his first season. He was a three-time NBA All-Star while playing for the Houston Rockets. Francis also played for the Orlando Magic and New York Knicks, finishing his career with the Beijing Ducks of the Chinese Basketball Association. He was known for his crossover dribble, driving ability, and flashy dunks. He was given the nickname Stevie Franchise.

== Early life and education ==
Francis was born and raised in Takoma Park, Maryland. He was nicknamed "Wink" as a child. After his mother (Brenda) died of cancer in 1995, his grandmother became a parent figure to him. He stopped playing basketball after his mother died. His father served 20 years in federal prison for bank robbery. Francis later described his stepfather, a garbage collector, as his best friend. As a youth, Francis received food stamps and lived in an apartment with 18 people.

Francis began working for drug dealers at ten years old and began selling crack cocaine on the street as a teenager during the American crack epidemic. He attended six high schools and played in a total of two high school basketball games. He dropped out of school at 18 years old after his mother died. Francis completed his GED after receiving an offer to play college basketball for San Jacinto College, whose coaches had noticed him at an Amateur Athletic Union tournament.

Francis attended San Jacinto College in 1996–97, and the Allegany College of Maryland in 1997–98. Francis became the first player to take two unbeaten teams into the National Junior College Tournament. In a game for Allegany, Francis recorded a quadruple double against Shawn Marion and Vincennes University.

== University of Maryland ==
Francis transferred to Maryland in 1998 for his junior season. The addition of Francis helped propel the Terrapins to a #5 preseason ranking. Francis made an instant impact as Maryland's starting shooting guard, scoring 17 points in the season opener against Western Carolina. Francis and the Terps gained national attention with impressive showings in the Puerto Rico Shootout and a 62–60 win over #5 Stanford in the BB&T Classic. The Terps climbed to a #2 national ranking by early December.

The Terrapins finished second in the ACC and Francis was named to the All-ACC first team and the All ACC Tournament team. The Terrapins were a number 2 seed in the NCAA tournament but were defeated by St. John's in the Sweet 16. Under Francis's leadership, Maryland finished with a school record 28 wins and only 6 losses and were ranked #5 in the final Associated Press poll.

Francis finished the season averaging 17 points per game, 4.5 assists per game, and 2.8 steals per game. He was a consensus second-team All-American and was named a finalist for the Wooden and Naismith Player of the Year Awards. Although he stated he was "99% sure" he would return to Maryland for his senior season, he opted to enter the NBA draft.

While a member of the Terrapins, Francis met Idan Ravin, who at the time was coaching youth basketball. Francis soon began attending Ravin's workouts and recommended Ravin as trainer to fellow college players, including Elton Brand. Ravin subsequently became a well-known trainer for a number of NBA players.

== NBA career ==
=== Houston Rockets (1999–2004) ===
Francis was selected second in the 1999 NBA draft by the Vancouver Grizzlies. In the lead up to the draft, Francis had visited Chicago and Charlotte – holders of the first and third picks – while refusing to visit Vancouver. He publicly announced that he did not want to play for the Grizzlies, citing the distance from his Maryland home, taxes, endorsements, and God's will. Heavily criticized for his antics, especially in Vancouver, he relented and briefly considered joining the Grizzlies before contentious negotiations and a prejudiced question posed by a ticket counter agent at Vancouver International Airport convinced Francis that he needed to go elsewhere.

Francis got his wish, being traded before the 1999–2000 season began to the Houston Rockets in a three-team, 11-player deal that brought Michael Dickerson, Othella Harrington, Antoine Carr and Brent Price, plus first- and second-round picks to the Grizzlies. It was the largest trade in NBA history at that time (in terms of the number of players and picks involved).

Though Francis shared Rookie of the Year honors with Elton Brand and finished as runner-up to Vince Carter in the 2000 Slam Dunk Contest, the Rockets finished the season with a 34–48 record.

The next season, the Rockets improved to 45–37 but still missed the playoffs. In his third season, Francis was chosen by fans to start the 2002 NBA All-Star Game, but ended up playing only 55 games due to a foot injury and recurring Ménière's-induced migraines. As a result, the Rockets posted a dismal 28–54 record, landing them into the lottery, where they selected 7'6" Chinese center Yao Ming with the first pick in the 2002 NBA Draft. Francis and Yao gelled their first season together, and were selected as 2003 NBA All-Star Game starters. Francis scored a career-high 44 points in a nationally televised home win against the Los Angeles Lakers on January 17, 2003. The team went 43–39, again missing the playoffs.

Rockets head coach Rudy Tomjanovich stepped down in 2003, and the team selected ex-New York Knicks coach Jeff Van Gundy as his successor. Van Gundy's coaching style did not fit Francis's style of play. Even though Francis made the All-Star game for a third straight year his stats declined in 2003–04, dropping from 21.0 PPG, 6.2 RPG, and 6.2 APG to 16.6 PPG, 5.5 RPG, and 6.2 APG. The Rockets, however, made the playoffs for the first time since 1999, which would be Francis's only postseason experience. Despite his averaging 19.2 ppg, 8.4 rpg, and 7.6 apg, the Rockets lost to the heavily favored Los Angeles Lakers in five games.

As Francis's relationship with Van Gundy deteriorated it was apparent that the Rockets wanted to go in a different direction. While the coach sought to focus the team's offense on Yao Ming, the Rockets ended up trading Francis, along with his best friend on the team, Cuttino Mobley, as well as Kelvin Cato, for Tracy McGrady, Juwan Howard, Tyronn Lue, and Reece Gaines.

During Francis's first tenure in Houston, he averaged 19.3 points, 6.4 assists, 6.1 rebounds, and 1.63 steals in 374 games (372 starts).

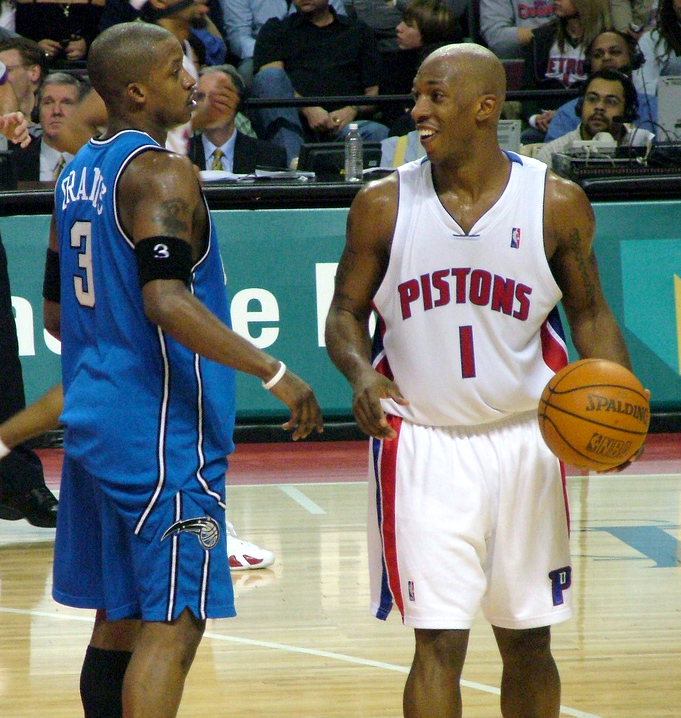
Francis (left) talking with Chauncey Billups.

=== Orlando Magic (2004–2006) ===
At first, Francis was unhappy with the trade to Orlando, but he adapted to his new environment. Francis flourished in the run n' gun offense of interim head coach Chris Jent. After posting a career-low 16.6 points per game the previous year with the Rockets, Francis averaged 21.3 points, 5.8 rebounds and 7.0 assists per game in his first season with the Magic. The Magic started out the year fast in the 2004–05 season, with Francis hitting several game-winning shots early in the season. On December 10, 2004, Francis scored 36 points, grabbed 8 rebounds, and recorded 8 assists in a 113–109 win over the Golden State Warriors. In the middle of that season, Mobley was traded to the Sacramento Kings, which upset Francis. The Magic slumped late and missed the playoffs.

The following season, in January 2006, a disgruntled Francis was suspended by the Magic for two games for conduct detrimental to the team. On February 5, 2006, there were rumors that he could be traded to the Denver Nuggets for Earl Watson but general manager Otis Smith publicly announced that he would not trade Francis. Still, rumors persisted that Francis would be traded to the New York Knicks, Los Angeles Lakers, Minnesota Timberwolves, Denver Nuggets or even back to his former team the Houston Rockets.

=== New York Knicks (2006–2007) ===
On February 22, 2006, one day before the NBA's trade deadline, Francis was traded to the New York Knicks for forward Trevor Ariza and the expiring contract of guard Penny Hardaway. Prior to the trade, the Nuggets reportedly offered both Watson and Kenyon Martin for Francis, but the deal never took place. He wore jersey #1 with the Knicks as his usual #3 was already assigned to Stephon Marbury. Francis endured a recurring injury, tendinitis in his right knee, and as a result began the 2006–07 season averaging only 11.3 ppg, as opposed to his career 18.4 ppg. On March 10, 2007, Francis scored 26 points, including a game-winning three point shot as time expired, and grabbed seven rebounds during a 90–89 win over the Washington Wizards.

On 2007 draft night, June 28, the Knicks traded Francis and Channing Frye to the Portland Trail Blazers for Zach Randolph, Dan Dickau, and Fred Jones; Portland then bought out the remaining two years of Francis's contract for a reported $30 million, making him an unrestricted free agent.

=== Return to Houston (2007–2008) ===
The Miami Heat, Dallas Mavericks, Houston Rockets, and the L. A. Clippers pursued Francis. On July 20, he chose the Rockets, signing a two-year $6 million contract with them, although the Heat offered the most money. But he failed to make Rick Adelman's rotation coming out of the preseason. He averaged 5.5 points and 3 assists in ten games before undergoing season-ending surgery stemming from an earlier left quadriceps tendon injury.

Francis used his contract option to come back to the Houston Rockets for the 2008–09 NBA season. He lost 15 pounds for training camp, but was not able to play in the beginning of the season due to the recovery period of his injury.

On December 24, 2008, the Houston Rockets traded Francis back to the team that had originally drafted him, the Grizzlies, except now the team was in Memphis. This trade was for a 2011 conditional draft pick. The move allowed the Rockets to drop under the luxury tax threshold. On January 27, 2009, it was reported that Francis was waived by the Grizzlies, without having appeared in a game for them. No other NBA teams expressed an interest in Francis.

=== Beijing Ducks (2010) ===
In November 2010, Francis signed with the Beijing Ducks of China. He averaged 0.5 points and 0.7 rebounds over four games, playing 14 minutes, before leaving the team in late December of the same year to return to the United States.

== Personal life ==
On September 27, 2001, a tornado struck the University of Maryland, College Park campus, killing two students and displacing 700 more from their dormitory. Francis, who was on campus at the time, arranged to sponsor a dinner for the displaced students before he flew back to Houston for his third season with the Rockets. He said, "I remember all of the people here supporting me while I was a Maryland student, and this is just a small way that I can give back to those who have helped me."

On February 17, 2002, Francis's #23 jersey was honored by Maryland in a ceremony preceding the game against the #1 ranked Duke Blue Devils. Francis sat on the team's bench during the game and cheered as the Terrapins upset the Blue Devils 87–73. On election day 2008, Francis supported presidential candidate Barack Obama by wearing a red velvet sports jacket with "Barack Obama" spelled on the back in sequins. Francis said he had followed the presidential race closely. "It's important that there is an African-American candidate running", Francis said. "I never thought I'd see the day that would happen. Right now, we're at a pivotal point. It's a great feeling for me."

Francis has suffered from Ménière's disease, which causes episodes of vertigo, tinnitus, and aural fullness.

Francis has ventured into several entrepreneurial projects, including a construction company, boxing promotions, a barbershop and clothing line (We R One), as well as a hip-hop record label, Mazerati Music.

After Francis left professional basketball and his stepfather committed suicide, he began drinking heavily. In November 2016, Francis was arrested in Houston for driving under the influence and a felony charge of threatening a public servant. In December 2016, he turned himself into Manatee County, Florida police who issued a warrant for his arrest on burglary charges following an incident in which he allegedly broke into a woman's car. In March 2017, he was granted a conditional discharge and sentenced to 50 hours of community service plus a fine of $7,300.

== Career statistics ==
Legend
GP	Games played	GS	Games started	MPG	Minutes per game
FG%	Field goal percentage	3P%	3-point field goal percentage	FT%	Free throw percentage
RPG	Rebounds per game	APG	Assists per game	SPG	Steals per game
BPG	Blocks per game	PPG	Points per game	**Bold**	Career high

=== NBA ===
==== Regular season ====
Year	Team	GP	GS	MPG	FG%	3P%	FT%	RPG	APG	SPG	BPG	PPG
1999–00	Houston	77	77	36.1	.445	.345	.786	5.3	6.6	1.5	.4	18.0
2000–01	Houston	80	79	39.9	**.451**	.396	.817	6.9	6.5	**1.8**	.4	19.9
2001–02	Houston	57	56	**41.1**	.417	.324	.773	**7.0**	6.4	1.2	.4	**21.6**
2002–03	Houston	**81**	**81**	41.0	.435	.354	.800	6.2	6.2	1.7	**.5**	21.0
2003–04	Houston	79	79	40.4	.403	.348	.775	5.5	6.2	**1.8**	.4	16.6
2004–05	Orlando	78	78	38.2	.423	.299	.823	5.8	**7.0**	1.4	.4	21.3
2005–06	Orlando	46	45	37.7	.433	.257	.797	4.8	5.7	1.1	.2	16.2
2005–06	New York	24	15	27.5	.442	**.538**	.761	3.0	3.5	1.0	.3	10.8
2006–07	New York	44	30	28.1	.408	.378	**.829**	3.6	3.9	.9	.3	11.3
2007–08	Houston	10	3	19.9	.333	.235	.565	2.3	3.0	.9	**.5**	5.5
Career		576	543	37.6	.429	.341	.797	5.6	6.0	1.5	.4	18.1
All-Star		3	3	24.3	.552	.500	.500	2.7	5.3	.7	.0	12.0

==== Playoffs ====
Year	Team	GP	GS	MPG	FG%	3P%	FT%	RPG	APG	SPG	BPG	PPG
2004	Houston	5	5	44.4	.429	.412	.725	8.4	7.6	1.4	.2	19.2
Career		5	5	44.4	.429	.412	.725	8.4	7.6	1.4	.2	19.2
