= Carmelo Anthony =

American basketball player (born 1984)

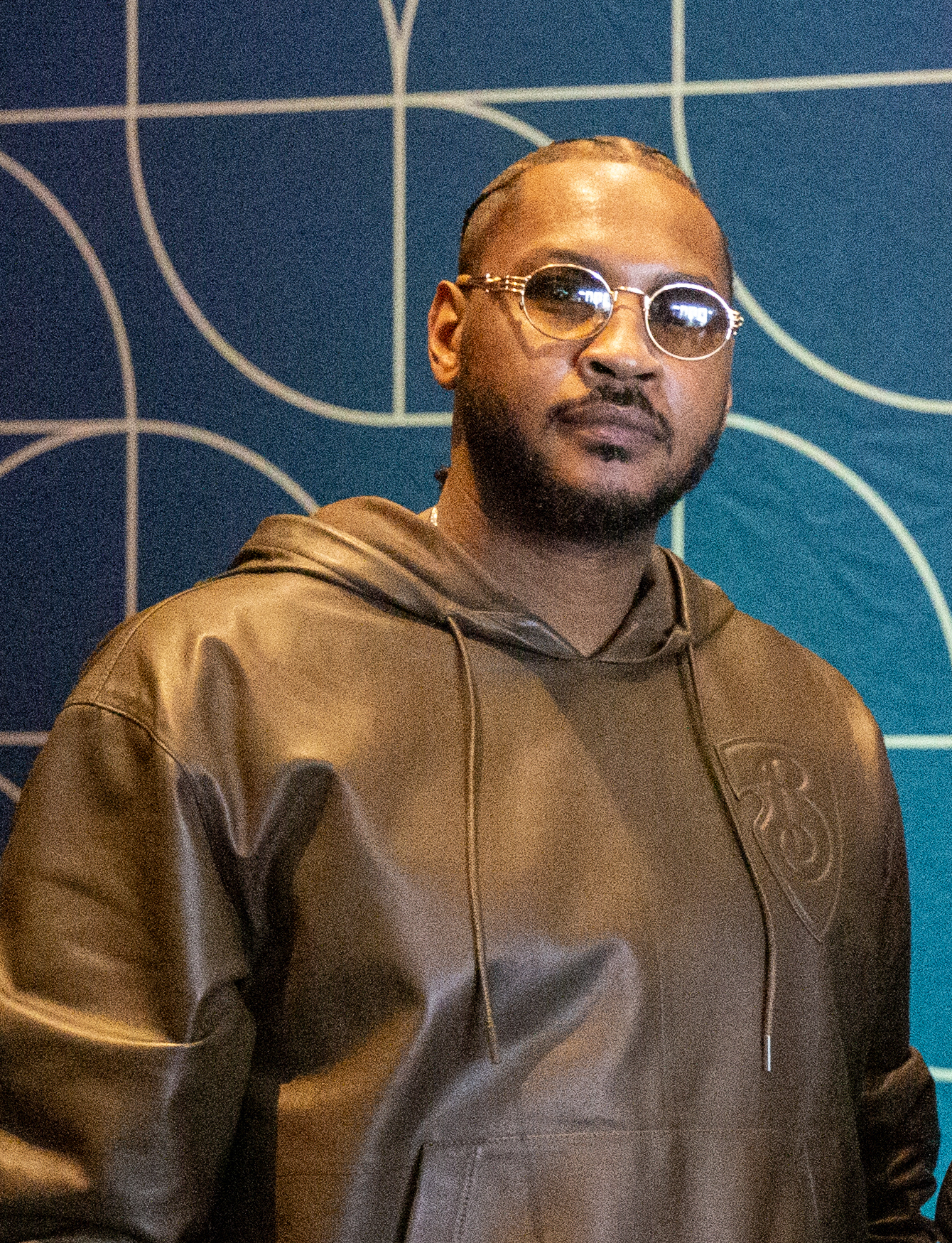
- Anthony in 2025

Personal information
- Born: May 29, 1984 (age 42) Brooklyn, New York, U.S.
- Listed height: 6 ft 7 in (2.01 m)
- Listed weight: 238 lb (108 kg)

Career information
- High school: Towson Catholic (Towson, Maryland); Oak Hill Academy (Mouth of Wilson, Virginia)
- College: Syracuse (2002–2003)
- NBA draft: 2003: 1st round, 3rd overall pick
- Drafted by: Denver Nuggets
- Playing career: 2003–2022
- Position: Small forward / power forward
- Number: 15, 7, 00

Career history
- 2003–2011: Denver Nuggets
- 2011–2017: New York Knicks
- 2017–2018: Oklahoma City Thunder
- 2018–2019: Houston Rockets
- 2019–2021: Portland Trail Blazers
- 2021–2022: Los Angeles Lakers

Career highlights
- 10× NBA All-Star (2007, 2008, 2010–2017); 2× All-NBA Second Team (2010, 2013); 4× All-NBA Third Team (2006, 2007, 2009, 2012); NBA scoring champion (2013); NBA All-Rookie First Team (2004); NBA 75th Anniversary Team; NCAA champion (2003); NCAA Final Four Most Outstanding Player (2003); Consensus second-team All-American (2003); USBWA National Freshman of the Year (2003); First-team All-Big East (2003); Big East Freshman of the Year (2003); No. 15 retired by Syracuse Orange; 2× USA Basketball Male Athlete of the Year (2006, 2016); First-team Parade All-American (2002); McDonald's All-American (2002)

Career NBA statistics
- Points: 28,289 (22.5 ppg)
- Rebounds: 7,808 (6.2 rpg)
- Assists: 3,422 (2.7 apg)
- Stats at NBA.com
- Stats at Basketball Reference
- Basketball Hall of Fame
Medals
Men's basketball
Representing the United States
Olympic Games
Gold medal – first place	2008 Beijing	Team
Gold medal – first place	2012 London	Team
Gold medal – first place	2016 Rio de Janeiro	Team
Bronze medal – third place	2004 Athens	Team
World Championship
Bronze medal – third place	2006 Japan
Americas Championship
Gold medal – first place	2007 Las Vegas

Carmelo Kyam Anthony (/kɑːrˈmɛloʊ/ kar-MEL-oh; born May 29, 1984) is an American former professional basketball player. Nicknamed "Melo", Anthony played 19 seasons in the National Basketball Association (NBA) and is a ten-time NBA All-Star and six-time All-NBA Team member. He played college basketball for the Syracuse Orange, winning a national championship as a freshman in 2003 while being named the NCAA Tournament's Most Outstanding Player. In 2021, he was named to the NBA 75th Anniversary Team, and is regarded as one of the greatest scorers in NBA history. He was inducted twice into the Naismith Memorial Basketball Hall of Fame in 2025, as an individual player and also as a member of the 2008 U.S. Olympic team.

After one season at Syracuse, Anthony entered the 2003 NBA draft and was selected with the third overall pick by the Denver Nuggets. While playing for Denver, he led the Nuggets to the playoffs every year from 2004 to 2010; the team won two division titles in that span. In 2009, Anthony led the Nuggets to their first conference finals appearance since 1985. In 2011, he was traded from Denver to the New York Knicks days before the NBA trade deadline. In a January 24, 2014, game against the Charlotte Bobcats, Anthony scored a career-high 62 points, setting a Knicks' single-game scoring record and a Madison Square Garden single-game scoring record. Anthony was traded to the Oklahoma City Thunder, where he played one season before a short stint with the Houston Rockets. He spent two seasons with the Portland Trail Blazers before finishing off his career with the Los Angeles Lakers.

Anthony has played in the Olympics for the US national team a record four times, winning a bronze medal with the 2004 squad and gold medals on the 2008, 2012, and 2016 teams. As of April 2016, he was the US Olympic team's all-time leader in points, rebounds, and games played. He currently ranks eleventh among NBA career scoring leaders.

== Early life ==
Anthony was born in the Red Hook Houses in Brooklyn, New York City. His father, Carmelo Iriarte, was born in Manhattan to Puerto Rican parents. Iriarte was of African, Spanish, and indigenous ancestry; some of his roots also traced to Venezuela. His mother, Mary Anthony, is African-American. Iriarte died of cancer when Anthony was two years old. When Anthony turned eight, his family moved to Baltimore.

Anthony commuted to Towson Catholic High School for his first three years of high school. During the summer of 1999, Anthony grew 5 inches (130 mm) into the frame of a 6-foot-5-inch (1.96 m) swingman. He became one of the area's top players and made a name for himself in the area, being named The Baltimore Sun's metro player of the year in 2001, as well as Baltimore Catholic League player of the year. During his sophomore year, he averaged 14 points, five rebounds, four assists and two steals. Towson Catholic surged to a record of 26–3 and finished third in the state tournament. Anthony enjoyed a successful high school basketball career as a junior, almost doubling his numbers in scoring and rebounds, averaging 23 points and 10.3 rebounds. Despite his successful year, Anthony was distracted by all of the attention and was suspended on several occasions for skipping classes. He barely registered a blip on the radars of pro scouts with his skinny frame and lack of strength; many scouts felt that he was not ready for the physical demands of the NBA. In the end, Towson Catholic fell short of the state title, although he was named Baltimore's County Player of the Year, All-Metropolitan Player of the Year and Baltimore Catholic League Player of the Year.

After his junior year, Division I coaches were lined up to recruit Anthony to a school on the East Coast, which included North Carolina and Syracuse. In contrast to contemporary prep-to-pro players like Kevin Garnett, Jermaine O'Neal, Kobe Bryant, Tracy McGrady or Amar'e Stoudemire, he decided to declare early and announce that he would attend Syracuse University before his senior year. As Anthony's grades dropped under a C average and his scores on the ACT were below acceptable standards, he knew that he needed to improve in the classroom to qualify academically for Syracuse. For his senior year, his mother considered transferring him to a different school. Anthony first thought of Virginia's Hargrave Military Academy but after talking to Steve Smith, the head coach at basketball powerhouse Oak Hill Academy, he eventually transferred to Oak Hill Academy in Virginia—winner of the USA Today 2000–01 high school championship—for his senior campaign. During the summer of 2001, Anthony led an AAU Baltimore Select team to the Final Four of the Adidas Big Time Tournament in Las Vegas, Nevada. Anthony attracted attention from the NBA by averaging 25.2 points a game in the tournament, which was also attended by Amar'e Stoudemire (who was already being touted as a future lottery pick). Anthony played at the USA Basketball Youth Development Festival where he helped the East Team win the silver medal. He tied LeBron James for the tournament scoring lead at 24 points per game and shot 66 percent from the field. It was there that Anthony and James struck up a friendship.

Oak Hill Academy entered the 2001–02 campaign boasting a 42-game winning streak. The team's first tournament win came in The Les Schwab Invitational against Mater Dei High School from Santa Ana, California, with Anthony winning the tournament MVP. Oak Hill won two more big-time tournaments, including the Nike Academy National Invitational where they knocked off then-No. 1 Westchester High School 77–61 in the final, and an anticipated game against St. Vincent – St. Mary High School of Akron, Ohio, where he was matched up with high school phenom LeBron James. James scored 36 points, while Anthony scored 34 points and grabbed 11 rebounds to lead Oak Hill to a 72–66 win. The team ended the season ranked third in the country at 32–1, with their only loss coming in a rematch against Mater Dei, which ended their unbeaten streak at 67. He averaged 21.7 points, 8.1 rebounds and 4.0 assists during his senior year at Oak Hill and named a USA Today All-USA First Team and a Parade First-Team All-American. He was selected to play in the Jordan Brand Classic, scoring a game-high 27 points, and the 2002 McDonald's All-American Game, where he played on the same team with two future New York Knicks teammates, Raymond Felton and Amar'e Stoudemire. In that game, he scored 19 points and won the Sprite Slam Jam dunk contest. His performances at the high school All-Star games helped lift his reputation with HoopScoop ranking him as the nation's No. 1 high school senior in the class of 2002, ranked second by College Basketball News and third by All-Star Sports. Due to his struggles with the ACT, his family and friends wondered whether Anthony would forget about his college plans to attend Syracuse and move on to the NBA. He had yet to produce the minimum score of 18; however, in late April Anthony got a 19 and decided to stick with college and prepared for his freshman year at Syracuse. In April 2009, he was named to the ESPN RISE's all-decade team and was honored as one of the 35 Greatest McDonald's All-Americans in January 2012.

== College career ==
Anthony played one season at Syracuse University, during the 2002–03 season, where he averaged 22.2 points (16th in the NCAA, fourth in the Big East) and 10.0 rebounds (19th in the NCAA, third in the Big East, first among NCAA Division I freshmen). He helped guide the Orangemen to their first ever NCAA tournament title in 2003. He led the team in scoring, rebounding, minutes played (36.4 minutes per game), field goals made and free throws made and attempted. Anthony's 33-point outburst against the University of Texas in the Final Four set an NCAA tournament record for most points by a freshman. In the championship game against the University of Kansas, Anthony had 20 points and 10 rebounds. For his efforts during the NCAA tournament, Anthony earned the tournament's Most Outstanding Player Award. Afterwards, Syracuse head coach Jim Boeheim described Anthony as "[...] by far, the best player in college basketball. It wasn't even close. Nobody was even close to him last year in college basketball. That's the bottom line".

Anthony said that he originally planned to stay at Syracuse for two to three seasons, but having already accomplished everything he set out to do, he chose to abandon his collegiate career (with Boeheim's blessing) and declared himself eligible for the 2003 NBA draft. Some of Anthony's highlights in his time with Syracuse include being named Second-Team All-American by the Associated Press as a freshman, leading his team to a 30–5 record, capturing the school's first ever NCAA title and being the consensus pick for NCAA Freshman of the Year. He was also named to the All-Big East First Team and was the consensus selection for the Big East Conference Freshman of the Year as well as unanimous selection for Big East All Rookie Team.

== Professional career ==
=== Denver Nuggets (2003–2011) ===
==== Rookie season ====
Anthony's NBA career began on June 26, 2003, when he was chosen third overall in the 2003 NBA draft by the Denver Nuggets. He was selected behind LeBron James (first overall, Cleveland Cavaliers) and Darko Miličić (second overall, Detroit Pistons). He made his NBA regular season debut on October 29, 2003, in an 80–72 home win against the San Antonio Spurs. Anthony finished the night with 12 points, seven rebounds, and three assists. In just his sixth career NBA game (November 7 versus the Los Angeles Clippers), Anthony scored 30 points, becoming the second youngest player in NBA history to score 30 points or more in a game (19 years, 151 days; Kobe Bryant was the youngest). It was the fewest games a Nuggets rookie took to score 30 points in a contest since the ABA–NBA merger. On February 9, 2004, against the Memphis Grizzlies, Anthony became the third-youngest player to reach the 1,000-point plateau in NBA history with a 20-point effort in an 86–83 win.

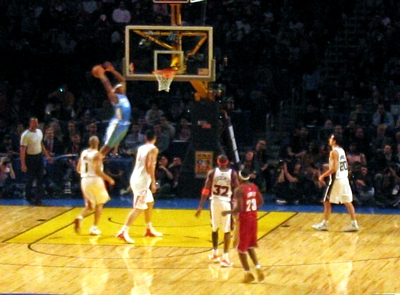
Anthony receiving an alley-oop during the 2004 Rookie Challenge game for the Rookies team

On February 13, 2004, Anthony participated in the Got Milk? Rookie Challenge at All-Star Weekend. On March 30, 2004, he scored 41 points against the Seattle SuperSonics to set a new Denver Nuggets franchise record for most points in a game by a rookie. He also became the second-youngest player (19 years, 305 days) to score at least 40 points in a game in NBA history. After winning the Rookie of the Month award for the Western Conference in the month of April, Anthony became the fourth player in NBA history to capture all six of the Rookie of the Month awards in a season. The others to do so were David Robinson, Tim Duncan and fellow rookie LeBron James. Anthony was also named NBA Player of the Week twice (March 10, 2004 – March 14, 2004, and April 6, 2004 – April 10, 2004) and was a unanimous NBA All-Rookie First Team selection. Anthony averaged 21.0 points per game during the season, which was more than any other rookie. Anthony was second in the NBA Rookie of the Year voting, finishing runner-up to the Cavaliers rookie standout, James.

Anthony played a major part in the turnaround of the Denver Nuggets from league laughingstock to playoff contender. In the season before Anthony was drafted by the team, the Nuggets finished with a 17–65 record, which tied them for worst in the NBA with the Cleveland Cavaliers. They finished the 2003–04 season with a 43–39 overall record, qualifying them as the eighth seed for the playoffs. Anthony became the first NBA rookie to lead a playoff team in scoring since David Robinson of the San Antonio Spurs during the 1989–90 season. In the 2004 NBA playoffs, the Nuggets faced the top-seeded Minnesota Timberwolves in the first round. In Anthony's first career playoff game, he had 19 points, six rebounds, and three assists, in a 106–92 loss at Minnesota. The Timberwolves eliminated the Nuggets in five games.

==== 2004–05 season ====
In Anthony's second season, he averaged 20.8 points per game, ranking him 19th in the NBA. Anthony placed 16th in the NBA for points per 48 minutes. On December 4, 2004, versus the Miami Heat, Anthony became the third-youngest player in NBA history to reach 2,000 career points. Only James and Bryant were younger when they reached that plateau. Anthony played again in the Got Milk? Rookie Challenge, this time suiting up for the sophomore squad. In front of his home fans of Denver (who were hosting the 2005 All-Star Game), Anthony scored a game-high 31 points to go along with five boards, two assists and two steals, en route to becoming the MVP of the game.

With Anthony's help, the Nuggets improved their season record by six games from the previous season, ending with a mark of 49–33. The Nuggets finished seventh place in the Western Conference (one spot higher than they finished the previous season). Denver faced the second-seeded San Antonio Spurs in the first round, winning the first game in San Antonio, 93–87. However, the eventual NBA champion Spurs won the next four games, eliminating the Nuggets from the playoffs.

==== 2005–06 season ====
Anthony played and started in 80 games during the 2005–06 season. He averaged 26.5 points (eighth, NBA), 2.7 assists, 4.9 rebounds and 1.1 steals per game. His eighth-place finish in NBA scoring was the highest finish by a Denver player since the 1990–91 season, when Nuggets guard Michael Adams finished the season sixth in NBA scoring. On November 23, 2005, with the Nuggets facing the two-time defending Eastern Conference Champion Detroit Pistons, Anthony hauled down his 1,000th career rebound. A month later, Anthony recorded a then career-high 45 points in a losing effort against the Philadelphia 76ers. On March 17, 2006, versus the Memphis Grizzlies, he scored 33 points to push his career point total over the 5,000 mark. Also, in doing so, he became the second youngest player to accomplish that feat (behind LeBron James). As the month of March came to a close, the Nuggets finished 11–5, and Anthony was named as the NBA Player of the Month for March. He also took home Player of the Week honors for March 13, 2006 – March 19, 2006.

During the season, Anthony made five game-winning shots in the last five seconds: at Houston on January 8, 2006; at home versus Phoenix on January 10; at Minnesota on February 24; at Indiana on March 15; at home versus the Los Angeles Lakers on April 6. All five of those game-winners were made on jump shots, while the shot against Minnesota was a three-point field goal. Anthony also made a shot in the final seconds to force overtime versus the Dallas Mavericks on January 6. He made shots in the final 22 seconds against the Cleveland Cavaliers on January 18, 2006, and the Philadelphia 76ers on March 9, which gave the Nuggets leads they would never lose. Anthony was named to the All-NBA Third Team.

The Nuggets finished the season in third place, winning the Northwest Division for the first time in Anthony's career. Denver faced the sixth-seeded Los Angeles Clippers in the first round of the playoffs. The Clippers held home court advantage in the series, due to ending the regular season with a better record (Denver finished 44–38; Los Angeles finished 47–35). The Clippers won the first two games of the series on their home floor. The Nuggets split their games at home in Denver (winning game three; losing game four). Denver then lost game five at Los Angeles, which eliminated the Nuggets from the playoffs. After the season, Anthony signed a 5-year, $80 million extension with the Nuggets.

==== 2006–07 season ====
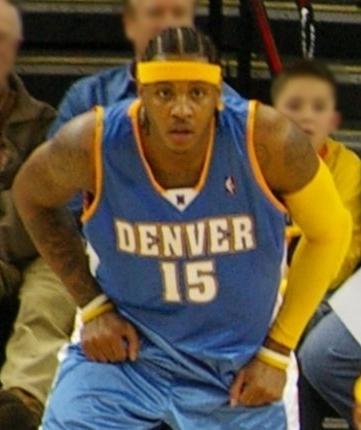
Anthony in 2007

Coincidentally, Alex English witnessed Anthony tie his record as English was an Assistant Coach at the time with the Toronto Raptors. After the Chicago victory, Anthony again tied the club record of six-straight 30-point games, failing to break it the second time around, as he scored 24 points in his 16th game (a 98–96 home loss to the Atlanta Hawks) on December 6. During a game at Madison Square Garden on December 16, Anthony was one of many players involved in the infamous Knicks–Nuggets brawl. Footage showed Anthony laying a punch on the face of New York's Mardy Collins and subsequently backing away. As a result of his actions, Anthony was suspended for 15 games by NBA commissioner David Stern. Shortly thereafter, the Nuggets traded for Allen Iverson. The duo did not get to play alongside one another until a home game against the Memphis Grizzlies on January 22, which was the day Anthony was allowed to return from his 15-game suspension. Anthony finished the game with 28 points, as he and Iverson combined for 51 points.

On February 2, 2007, Anthony and teammate J. R. Smith were involved in a minor car accident. Neither player was injured in the collision. The only information released by the team was that the car Smith was driving belonged to Anthony. Three days later, Anthony recorded his first career triple-double, with 31 points, 10 rebounds and 10 assists, in a 113–108 loss to the Phoenix Suns. When the reserves for the Western Conference All-Star team were announced, Anthony was not included on the roster. However, with Yao Ming and Carlos Boozer out with injuries, NBA commissioner David Stern chose Anthony as a replacement (along with Josh Howard). Anthony scored 20 points with nine rebounds in his All-Star debut. Anthony was the first Denver Nugget to be named an All-Star since Antonio McDyess in 2001.

Anthony won Player of the Week honors three times during the season (November 20–26; November 27 – December 3; and February 5–11), and received Player of the Month honors for April. Anthony finished the season as the league's second leading scorer behind Bryant, with an average of 28.9 points, while adding 6.0 rebounds, 3.8 assists and 1.2 steals per game. He was named to All-NBA Third Team for the second straight year.

==== 2007–08 season ====
On January 24, 2008, Anthony was named to his second consecutive NBA All-Star Game—his first as a starter. He finished as the leading vote-getter among Western Conference forwards (1,723,701 votes) and second in overall voting to Kobe Bryant (2,004,940 votes) among all Western Conference players. On February 8, Anthony scored a then career-high 49 points in a 111–100 home win over the Washington Wizards. He had a field goal percentage of .760 on a 19-of-25 shooting effort, and his shooting percentage was the second highest in the last 13 years for a player who took 25 or more shots in a game (Bryant was first with a .769 field goal percentage on a 20-of-26 shooting effort, in a 99–94 road victory over the Houston Rockets on December 21, 2000). On March 27, in a home win over the Dallas Mavericks, Anthony scored his 9,000th career point. He played in 77 games during the regular season, finishing as the NBA's fourth-leading scorer with 25.7 points per game, and had career-highs in rebounds per game (7.4) and steals per game (1.3). He tied his career-high in blocks per game (0.5), and ended the season with 3.4 assists per game, which was the second-best mark of his career.

The Nuggets finished the 2007–08 season with exactly 50 wins (50–32 overall record, tied for the third-best all-time Nuggets record since the team officially joined the NBA in 1976), following a 120–111 home victory over the Memphis Grizzlies in the last game of the season. It was the first time since the 1987–88 NBA season that the Nuggets finished with at least 50 wins in a season. Denver ended up as the eighth seed in the Western Conference of the 2008 playoffs, and their 50 wins marked the highest win total for an eighth seed in NBA history. It also meant that for the first time in NBA history, all eight playoff seeds in a conference had at least 50 wins. The Nuggets faced the top-seeded Los Angeles Lakers (57–25 overall record) in the first round of the Playoffs. The seven games separating the Nuggets overall record and the Lakers overall record is the closest margin between an eighth seed and a top seed since the NBA went to a 16-team playoff format in 1983–84. The Lakers swept the Nuggets in four games, marking the second time in NBA history that a 50-win team was swept in a best-of-seven playoff series in the first round. For the series, Anthony averaged 22.5 points, 9.5 rebounds (playoff career-high), 2.0 assists and 0.5 steals per game.

==== 2008–09 season ====
The 2008–09 campaign began with Allen Iverson being traded to the Detroit Pistons in exchange for guard Chauncey Billups. On December 10, 2008, in a 116–105 home win over the Timberwolves, Anthony tied George Gervin for the most points scored in one quarter in NBA history by scoring 33 points in the third quarter. Gervin had set the record when he was competing against David Thompson for the scoring title on the last day of the 1977–78 season. Anthony shot 12 of 15 (80%) in the third quarter and finished the game with 45 points, 11 rebounds, three assists, and four steals. The record was broken in January 2015 by Klay Thompson of the Golden State Warriors. On January 4, 2009, Anthony broke a bone in his hand in a game against the Indiana Pacers. He opted to have the hand splinted rather than have surgery; his recovery time was estimated at three to four weeks. He had already missed three games in late December with a sore elbow. Anthony returned from injury and to the Nuggets starting lineup on January 30, 2009, in a game against the Charlotte Bobcats in which he scored 19 points. Anthony was suspended for one game by the Nuggets for staying on the court and refusing to leave the game after coach George Karl benched him during a game against the Pacers.

The Nuggets won the Northwest Division and placed second in the Western Conference, finishing the season with a franchise record-tying 54 wins (54–28 overall). Anthony averaged 22.8 points per game and made a career-high 37.1% of his shots from three-point range. After losing in five straight playoff appearances (2004–2008), on April 29, 2009, Anthony won his first playoff series when the Nuggets beat the New Orleans Hornets at home 107–86 where Anthony finished with a playoff career-high 34 points and four steals. In a post-game conference, Anthony said "Yeah, finally... Took me 5 years to get that gorilla off my back, it's a great feeling." The Nuggets beat the Hornets in five games in the first round of the playoffs and proceeded to beat the Dallas Mavericks 4–1 in the conference semifinals with Anthony scoring 30 points in a solid game five performance. In the third game of the series, Anthony made a last second three-point shot to give the Nuggets the win after being down by two points (103–105). Denver advanced to the conference finals for the first time since 1985 but was eliminated, 4–2, by the eventual NBA champion Los Angeles Lakers on his birthday.

Anthony was named to the All-NBA Third Team for the third time in his career.

==== 2009–10 season ====
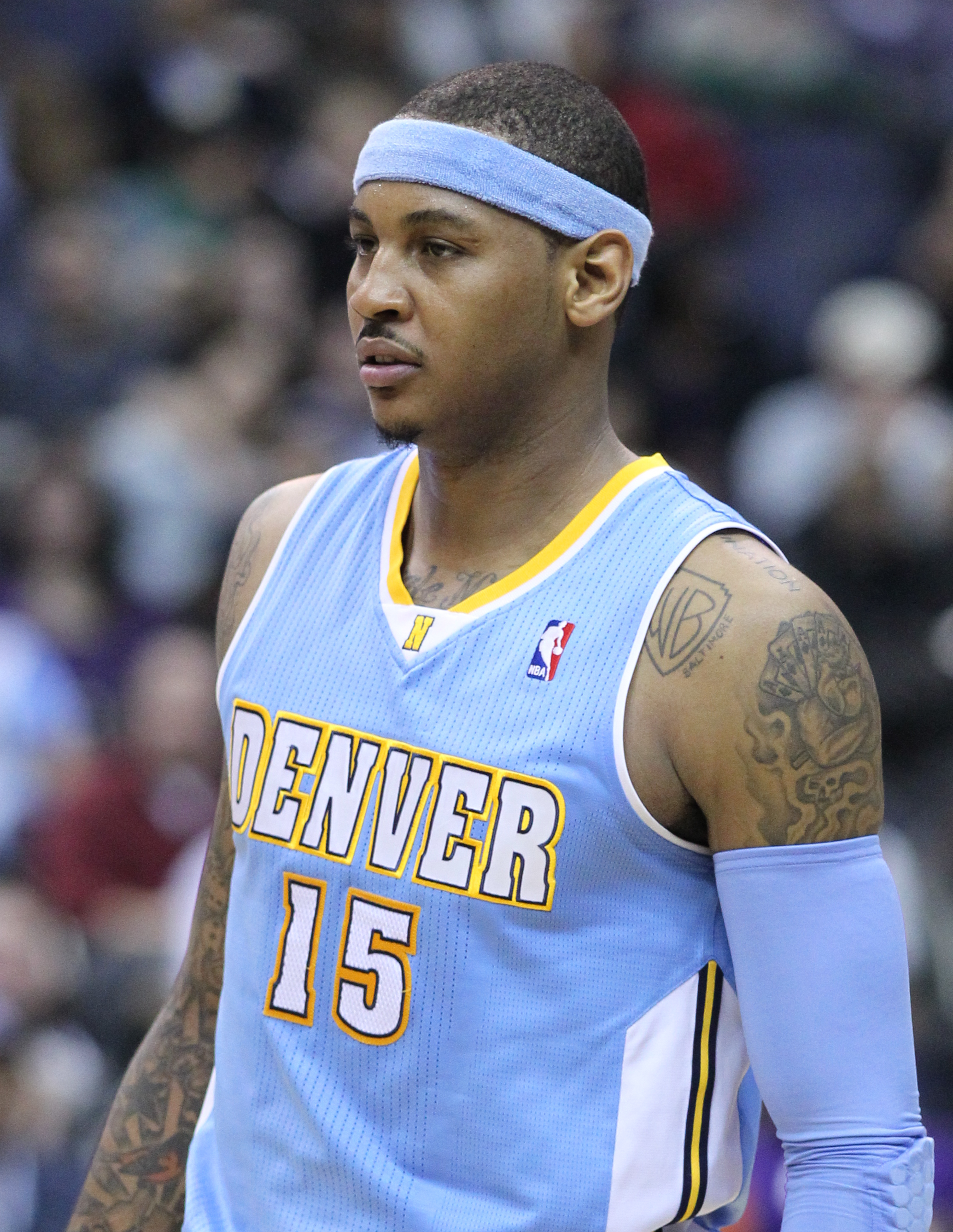
Anthony during his tenure with the Nuggets

In the opening two games of the 2009–10 season, Anthony totaled 71 points, scoring 30 points in the home opener and 41 the next night, in wins against division rivals Utah Jazz and Portland Trail Blazers respectively. Anthony became one of three players in the Nuggets' history to open with 70 or more points through two games—tied with Nick Van Exel with 71 points—surpassed only by Alex English who did it twice, in 1985 (79) and 1988 (74). It was also only the second time since 1987 that the Nuggets started the season 2–0. In their third game, Anthony scored 42 points. It was the first time they went 3–0 since 1985. In the month of November, Anthony was named the NBA player of the week and Western Conference Player of the Month, leading the Nuggets to a 12–5 start.

In the 15th regular season game against the Minnesota Timberwolves, Anthony entered the game leading the league in points per game (30.2) and was the only player in the league to score at least 20 points in every game. He finished the game with 22 points which was his fifteenth consecutive game with at least 20 points breaking the previous franchise record of 14 straight set by English. The following game, Anthony scored a career-high 50 points in a home game against the New York Knicks while teammate Chauncey Billups added 32 points in the game, making them only the third duo in NBA history to score at least 50 and 30 points respectively. Two days later, Anthony scored a total of 32 points. On January 21, 2010, Anthony was named as a starter for the 2010 NBA All-Star Game leading the Western Conference ballots in votes for forwards. This was Anthony's third All-Star appearance and second as a starter. He finished the game with a team-high 27 points and 10 rebounds.

In the team's first game after the All-Star Game, the Nuggets visited the Cleveland Cavaliers in a highly anticipated game with the Cavaliers having a 13-game winning streak. While LeBron James posted a triple-double of 43 points, 13 rebounds and 15 assists, Anthony compiled 40 points, six rebounds and seven assists in an overtime win as Anthony nailed a jumper over the outstretched arms of James with just 1.9 seconds left in the game, ending the Cavaliers' win streak. On March 26, 2010, Anthony made a game-winning shot at the buzzer, after missing his first attempt, against the Toronto Raptors. The Nuggets concluded the 2009–10 regular season with a 53–29 record and the Northwest Division title for the second straight season facing the Utah Jazz in the first round. In Game 1, Anthony scored a playoff-career-high 42 points. This also matched a franchise-playoff high for scoring in a single playoff game, tied with Alex English.

Anthony was named to the All-NBA Second Team for the first time in his career.

==== 2010–11 season ====
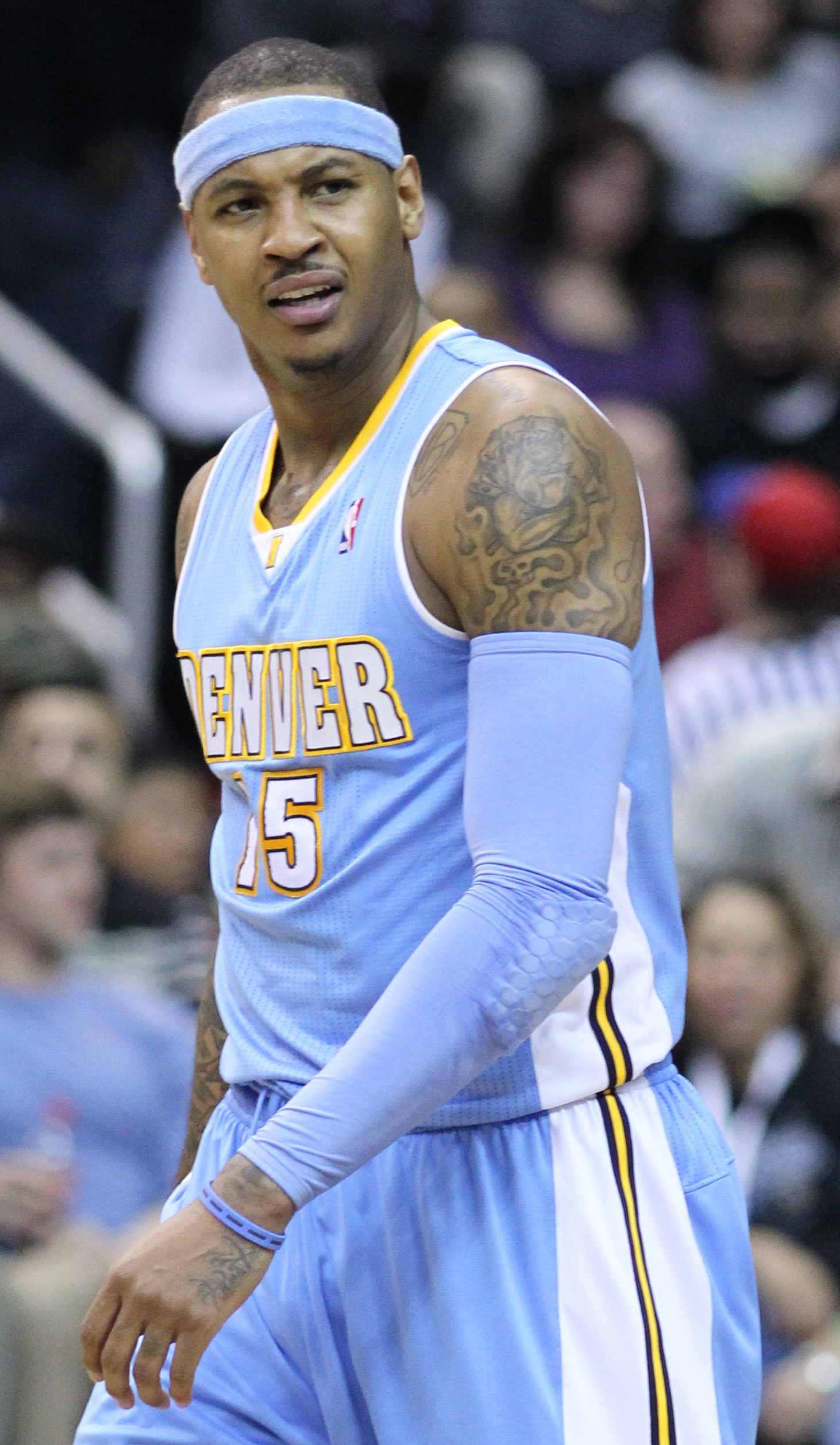
Carmelo Anthony finished his run with the Nuggets as the franchise's all-time leading scorer (he was later surpassed by Nikola Jokić.

The 2010–11 season began with speculation that Anthony had requested a trade. Anthony refused to sign a proposed contract extension. Sources reported that Anthony's preferred destination was the New York Knicks, with other teams such as the New Jersey Nets, Houston Rockets and Atlanta Hawks said to be interested. Anthony's trade request was not initially fulfilled, and he began the season on the Nuggets' roster. On November 15, 2010, Anthony had 20 points and a career-high 22 rebounds for the first 20–20 game of his career against the Phoenix Suns. He also a hit game-winning jumper at the buzzer against the Chicago Bulls on November 26, 2010.

=== New York Knicks (2011–2017) ===
==== 2010–11 season ====
On February 22, 2011, Anthony, along with point guard Chauncey Billups, was traded to the New York Knicks in a multi-player deal also involving the Minnesota Timberwolves. With a potential labor stoppage looming, immediately prior to the trade Anthony signed a veteran-max three-year, $65 million extension through the 2014–15 season. With the Knicks, Anthony chose to wear number 7, as his former number 15 was retired by the Knicks in honor of Earl Monroe and Dick McGuire. He chose that number because his son was born on March 7, and because 7 was the result of subtracting his number in Denver, 15, from his high school number of 22. Anthony's first game with the Knicks was a 114–108 win against the Milwaukee Bucks in which he scored 27 points and had 10 rebounds and an assist. After Anthony's acquisition, the Knicks qualified for the playoffs as the sixth seed in the Eastern Conference and were matched up against the Boston Celtics. During the series, the Knicks struggled with injuries as Amar'e Stoudemire and Billups went down. In game two of the NBA playoffs in Boston, Anthony tied a playoff career high with 42 points and also had 17 rebounds and six assists in a Knicks loss. The Knicks fell to the Boston Celtics in four games in the first round of the playoffs.

==== 2011–12 season ====
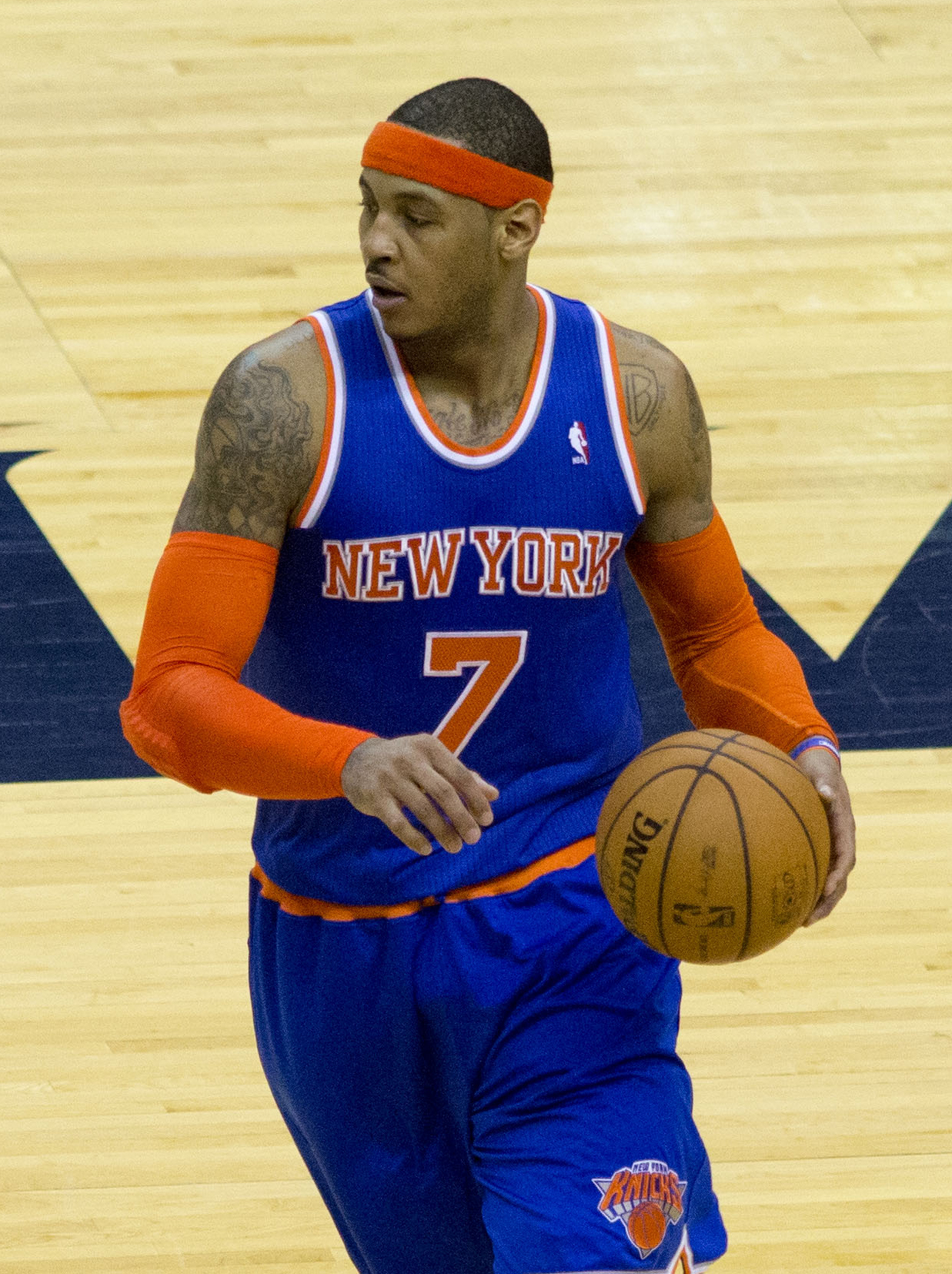
Anthony in March 2013

The 2011–12 season brought new expectations, as the season would be Anthony's first full season as a Knick. The Knicks struggled throughout the season, as injuries derailed the team. Anthony himself missed 11 games; during this stretch, the Knicks inserted Jeremy Lin as the team's starting point guard. This led to a historic stretch of games by Lin, and a period of basketball hysteria known as Linsanity. However, the team found themselves with an 18–24 record, leading to the resignation of coach Mike D'Antoni. Anthony was assumed to have a role in the coach's departure, as he was not a good fit in D'Antoni's high paced offense. Mike Woodson took over for D'Antoni; this led to an improvement in Anthony's play, as he was more suited for Woodson's halfcourt offense. On Easter Sunday, Anthony had arguably his best game in a Knicks uniform as he scored 43 points and hit two clutch three-pointers in a victory over Chicago. Under Woodson, the Knicks finished the season at 18–6, a vast improvement from the 18–24 record they had under D'Antoni.

The Knicks qualified for the playoffs as the seventh seed in the Eastern Conference, and faced off against the eventual champions, the Miami Heat. During the series, the Knicks were hampered by injuries as they were a season before. Tyson Chandler was diagnosed with the flu for game 1, Iman Shumpert tore his ACL, Baron Davis tore his patella tendon, and All-Star Amar'e Stoudemire sustained a laceration on his hand after punching a fire extinguisher out of anger after a loss. In addition, Jeremy Lin had torn his left meniscus before the playoffs started. Despite the injuries, Anthony was able to lead the Knicks to their first playoff win since 2001. In the game, Anthony scored 41 points. The Knicks were eventually eliminated in five games, 4–1. Anthony was voted to the All-NBA Third Team for the fourth time in his career alongside teammate Tyson Chandler.

==== 2012–13 season ====
On December 3, 2012, Anthony was named Eastern Conference Player of the Week for the period November 26 to December 2, 2012. On January 7, 2013, Anthony received his second Player of the Week for games played from December 31, 2012, to January 6, 2013. During that time, he led the team to a 2–1 record, tallying a league-best 36.0 points per game. The week was highlighted by a pair of 40-point games, first in a loss to Portland (45 points, seven rebounds, four assists) on January 1, and then in a victory over Orlando (40 points, six rebounds and six assists) on January 5. On January 9, 2013, Anthony was suspended for one game without pay for confronting Kevin Garnett after a game on January 7. On January 30, 2013, in a game against the Orlando Magic, Anthony set the Knicks' team-record with 30 straight 20-point games, breaking the old record set by Richie Guerin (29 games). Anthony later extended the record to 31 games after he scored 25 points in a 96–86 victory against the Milwaukee Bucks.

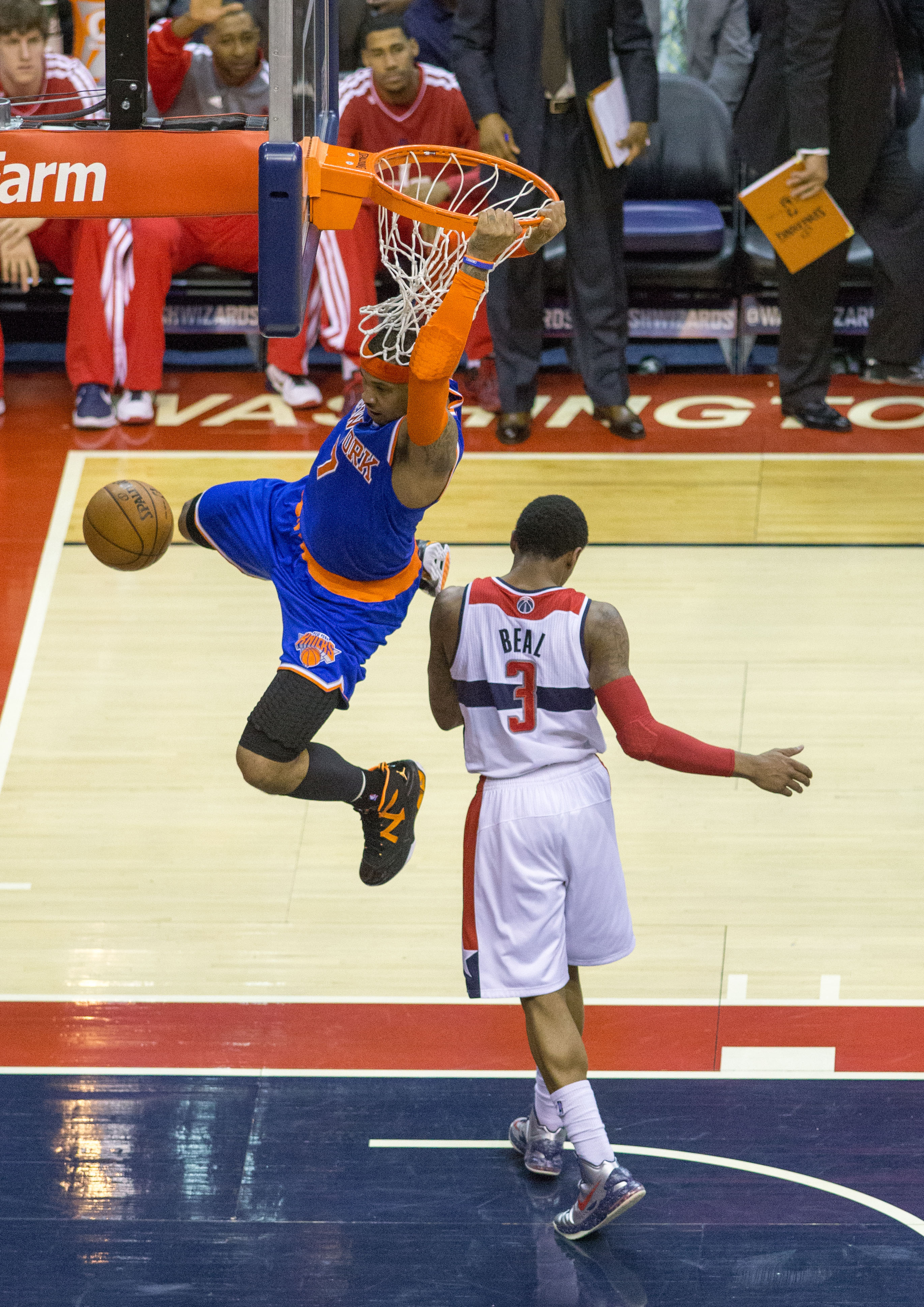
Anthony dunking in 2013

On March 29, 2013, Anthony recorded 32 points and 11 rebounds in a 111–102 victory over the Charlotte Bobcats. His teammate J. R. Smith scored 37 points in the game. On March 31, 2013, Anthony scored 24 points and grabbed 10 rebounds in a win against the Boston Celtics as he recorded a double-double in consecutive games. With the victory, the Knicks won the season series against the Celtics (3–1) for the first time since the 2003–04 season. On April 2, 2013, Anthony tied his career high by scoring 50 points in a 102–90 win over the Miami Heat and became the first player in NBA history to record 50+ points with no baskets in the paint. He followed the next night with 40 points in a 95–82 victory over the Atlanta Hawks, and then 41 points against the Milwaukee Bucks two days later, becoming the first Knicks player since Bernard King to score 40+ points in three consecutive games. He also became only the third NBA player to score at least 40 points on at least 60% field-goal shooting in three consecutive games, joining King and Michael Jordan. On April 7, 2013, Anthony scored 36 points and 12 rebounds, nine offensive, as the Knicks tallied their 12th straight win in a 125–120 victory over the Oklahoma City Thunder. By scoring 36 points to Kevin Durant's 27 points, he overtook the latter in the scoring race, upping his season average to 28.44 to Durant's 28.35 points per game.

On April 8, 2013, Anthony was named Eastern Conference Player of the Week for the period April 1–7, 2013. He led the Knicks to a 4–0 record as part of their 12-game winning streak, during which he averaged 41.8 points per game. No NBA player had scored at least 35 points in five straight games since Kobe Bryant in the 2006–07 season. In 2013, Anthony became the first Knicks player with the highest-selling jersey in the NBA, based on sales at the NBA Store and NBAstore.com, since the league started tracking jersey sales in 2001.

On April 11, 2013, the Knicks' 13-game winning streak ended with a loss to the Bulls, 118–111. Despite the loss, Anthony scored 36 points on top of a season-high 19 rebounds, and he set a franchise record with six straight games with at least 35 points. On April 15, 2013, Anthony won his second straight Eastern Conference Player of the Week award for games played from April 8 to 15, 2013, when he led the team to a 3–1 record. For the week, he averaged a conference-best 32.0 points and a seventh-best 11.5 rebounds per game. He became the 2013 NBA scoring champion with 28.7 points per game after second place scorer and three-time reigning scoring champion Kevin Durant decided to sit out his last regular season game against the Milwaukee Bucks, ending his season with an average of 28.1 points per game. At the close of the regular season, Anthony was named as the Eastern Conference Player of the Month for April. Anthony broke LeBron James' stranglehold on the monthly award after James had received such honors five times that season.

In the 2013 NBA playoffs, Anthony scored 21 points to go with seven rebounds, five assists, two steals and one block against the Boston Celtics, in their first round playoff series. It was the Knicks' first playoff series win since 2000. Anthony averaged a team-high 29.2 points per game in the series. This was the second highest playoff series average of a Knicks player against the Celtics, behind Ewing's 31.6 during their 1989–90 first round series. In the next round, the Knicks were defeated by the Indiana Pacers in six games. On May 23, 2013, Anthony was named to the All-NBA Second Team. It was the second time in Anthony's career that he made the Second Team.

==== 2013–14 season ====
Early in the 2013–14 NBA season, the Knicks suffered a nine-game losing streak, as the team opened with a 3–13 record. Despite the losing record, Anthony continued to play well under the circumstances, averaging 26.3 points, 9.9 rebounds and 1.1 steals per game, nine double-doubles including four straight: against Indiana (30 points and 18 rebounds), Washington (23 and 12), Portland (34 and 15) and Los Angeles Clippers (27 and 10).

However, at the start of 2014, the Knicks went 4–1, including big wins against previous season finalists Miami Heat and San Antonio Spurs. In the victory against the Heat, Anthony and James ended up in a virtual deadlock as the former registered 29 points (shooting 12-of-24), eight rebounds, five assists and two steals as against the latter's 32 points (shooting 12-of-17), five rebounds, six assists, one steal and one block.

On January 24, he established his career high, the Knicks' franchise record, and the Madison Square Garden record for single-game scoring with a 62-point, 13-rebound, 0 turnover effort against the Charlotte Bobcats. On January 30, in a 117–86 victory against the Cleveland Cavaliers, Anthony became the 50th NBA player to score 19,000 career points. Anthony became the fifth-youngest NBA player to achieve the feat. Anthony was named Eastern Conference Player of the Month for January after leading the conference in scoring with 28.7 points per game while also averaging nine rebounds per contest.

On February 16, 2014, Anthony played in his seventh All-Star Game as a starter for the East All-Stars.

On March 10, 2014, Anthony won his second Eastern Conference Player of the Week for games played March 3–9, after he averaged 29.0 points per game, while the Knicks went 3–1.

For the 2013–14 season, Anthony averaged 27.4 points, 8.1 rebounds, and 3.1 assists in a league-leading 38.7 minutes per game, but would miss the NBA playoffs for the first time in his career.

On June 23, 2014, Anthony informed the Knicks that he would opt out of his contract and become a free agent. On July 13, 2014, Anthony re-signed with the Knicks to a five-year, $124 million contract.

==== 2014–15 season ====
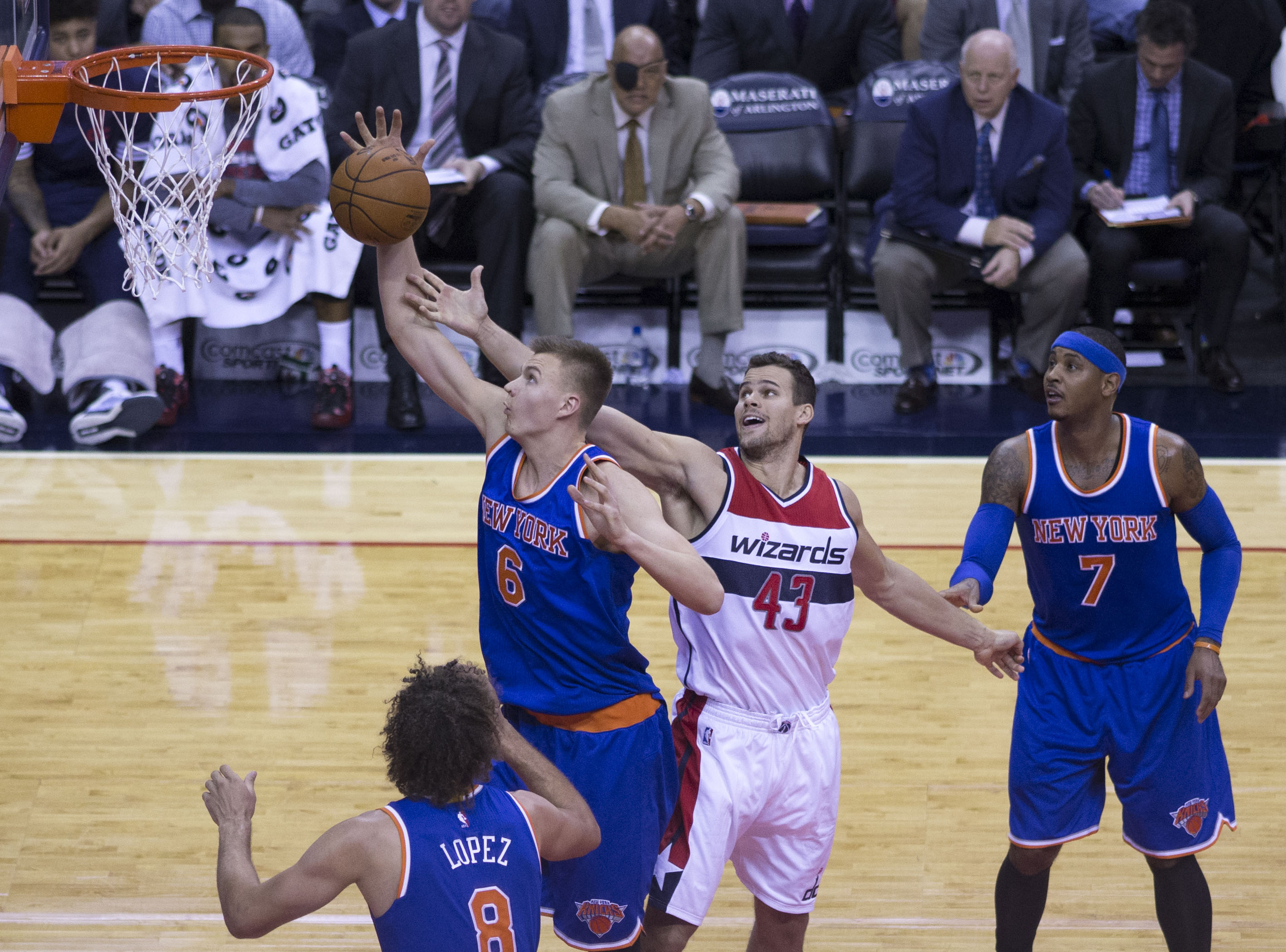
Kristaps Porziņģis and Anthony

In just the team's third game in the season, Anthony became the 40th member of the 20,000 points club, when he hit a three-pointer early in the first quarter of a 96–93 victory over the Charlotte Hornets. He eventually finished with 28 points, hiking his total to 20,025 career points. In the process, he became the 10th active player to achieve the milestone and the sixth youngest in NBA history to reach the milestone just behind LeBron James (28 years, 17 days), Kobe Bryant (29 years, 122 days), Wilt Chamberlain (29 years, 134 days), Michael Jordan (29 years, 326 days) and Oscar Robertson (30 years, 97 days).

On January 22, 2015, Anthony was named as a starter in the 2015 NBA All-Star Game, his seventh consecutive start and eight overall alongside LeBron James, Pau Gasol, Kyle Lowry and John Wall. After competing in the All-Star game and scoring 10 points, Anthony was ruled out for the rest of the season on February 18, after undergoing left knee surgery. Anthony only played 40 games for the season ending with season averages of 24.2 ppg, 6.6 rpg, 3.1 apg and 1.0 spg.

==== 2015–16 season ====
On January 20, 2016, in the Knicks' 118–111 overtime win against the Jazz, Anthony recorded 30 points, seven rebounds and nine assists, while passing Larry Bird for 31st place in career points scored. On January 21, Anthony was voted as starter for the 2016 NBA All-Star Game. In the All-Star game Anthony recorded 11 points, 6 rebounds and 1 block in the East's 196–173 loss to the West. On January 23, Anthony moved past Gary Payton as the league's 30th all-time career scoring leader in a 97–84 loss to the Charlotte Hornets. In the team's 128–97 victory against the Phoenix Suns on March 9, 2016, Anthony scored 23 points with 7 rebounds as he passed another NBA legend, Clyde Drexler, in the career scoring list moving up to No. 29.

While Anthony ended the season with an average of 21.8 ppg (1,573 points in 72 games), below his 25.2 ppg average entering the season, he set a career-high 4.2 apg average (299 assists in 72 games), the first and only time that he averaged over 4.0 apg in his career.

==== 2016–17 season ====
On December 9, 2016, in a game against the Sacramento Kings, Anthony became the fifth active player to eclipse the 23,000 point mark. He also became the 29th player in NBA history to hit the scoring milestone. On December 25, 2016, in a Christmas Day game against the Boston Celtics, Anthony moved past Elgin Baylor into 28th place on the NBA career scoring list when he scored 29 points upping his total to 23,156 compared to Baylor's 23,149.

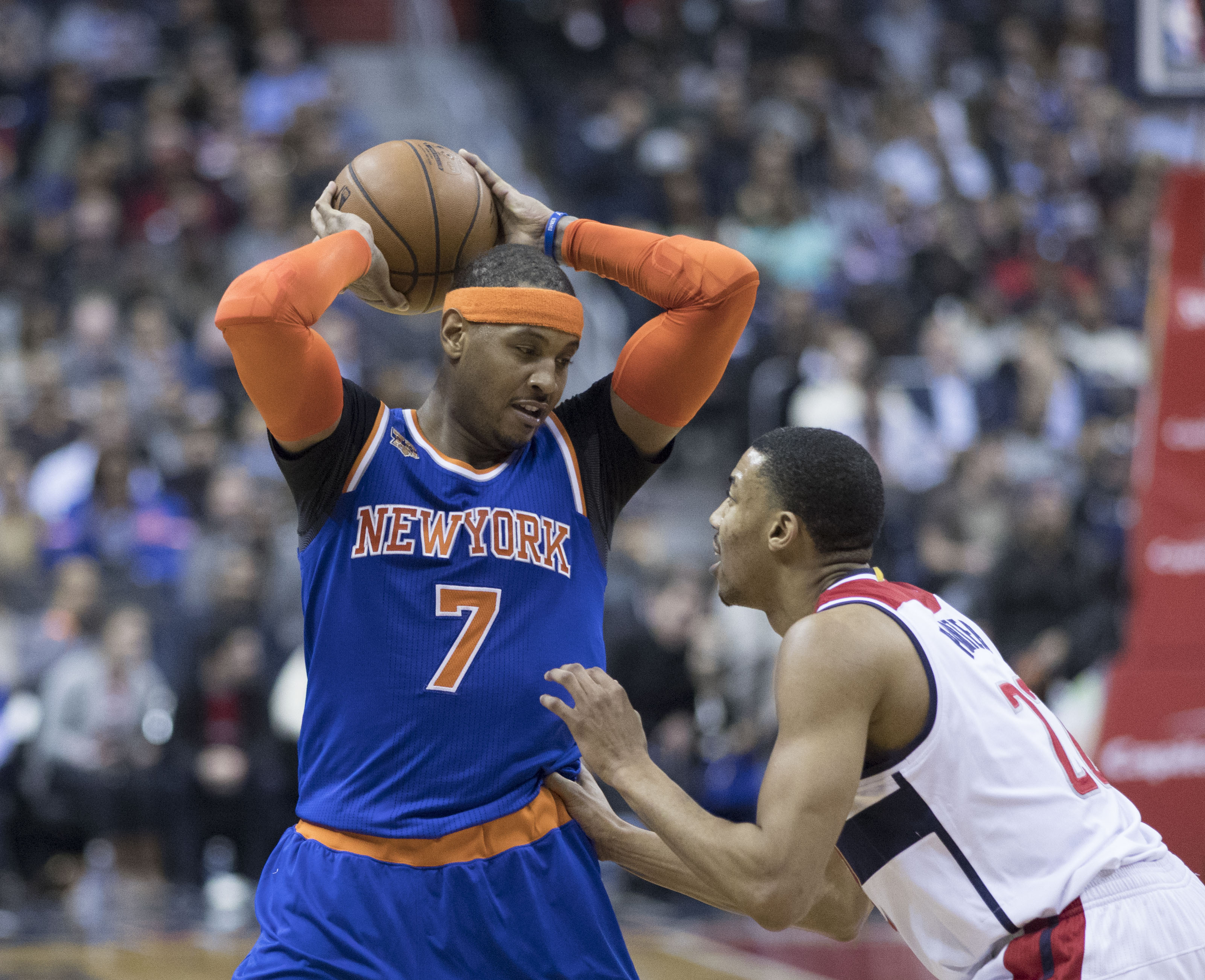
Anthony with the Knicks in 2017

In a January 11, 2017, game against the Philadelphia 76ers, which the team lost 98–97 on a buzzer-beater, Anthony scored 28 points to move past Robert Parish into 26th place in the NBA career scoring ladder. On January 19, 2017, Anthony scored a Knicks-record 25 points in the second quarter, breaking the old record of 24 points shared by Hall of Famer Willis Reed and Allan Houston. Reed scored his 24 points also in the second quarter, while Houston's 24 points came in the fourth quarter.

On January 29, 2017, Anthony scored a season-high 45 points, his first 40-point game of the season, in a quadruple-overtime 142–139 loss to the Atlanta Hawks. He added six rebounds, four assists and a block.

In the February 12, 2017, game against the San Antonio Spurs, where the team eked out a 94–90 victory that salvaged the finale of their five-game homestand, Anthony scored a game-high 25 points to move past Charles Barkley into 25th position in the NBA career scoring list. He also had the fifth-most points among active players after Nowitzki, James, Pierce, and Carter, who was No. 24 in the scoring list. It was the 12th time Anthony has scored at least 17 points in his last 13 games that included his season-high of 45 points in a quadruple-OT loss to the Atlanta Hawks. On February 15, 2017, he was announced as the replacement for Kevin Love on the 2017 NBA All-Star Game, thus gaining his tenth All-Star appearance. Anthony played 19 minutes, scored 10 points on a 4-of-8 shooting including 2–6 on three-pointers and grabbed three rebounds in the All-Star Game.

On March 12, 2017, in a 120–112 loss to Knicks cross-town rivals Brooklyn Nets, Anthony became only the third player to score 10,000 points for two franchises, joining Kareem Abdul-Jabbar (Milwaukee Bucks and L.A. Lakers) and Elvin Hayes (San Diego/Houston Rockets and Baltimore/Capital/Washington Bullets). He began his career with the Denver Nuggets, where he scored a total of 13,970 points in 564 games. Two days later, on March 14, in an 87–81 victory over the Indiana Pacers, ending a three-game losing streak, Anthony surpassed the 24,000 career point mark by scoring 22 points with 13 rebounds.

==== 2017 off-season ====
During the 2017 off-season, after multiple conflicts with the then-team president Phil Jackson, Anthony demanded a trade. Originally, the only team for which Anthony was willing to waive his no-trade clause was the Houston Rockets. However, Anthony expanded his list of teams to include the Cleveland Cavaliers and the Oklahoma City Thunder.

On September 25, 2017, Anthony was traded to the Thunder in exchange for future teammate Enes Kanter, Doug McDermott and a 2018 second-round pick. During Anthony's seven seasons with the Knicks, the team won one playoff series.

=== Oklahoma City Thunder (2017–2018) ===
On November 9, 2017, with only 12 points needed to move up in the rankings, Anthony passed Allen Iverson on the NBA all-time scoring list and moved to the 24th spot. He finished the game with 28 points. On November 26, 2017, Anthony passed Ray Allen on the NBA all-time scoring list and moved to 23rd place. On December 11, 2017, Anthony passed Vince Carter for 22nd on the NBA all-time scoring list.

On January 27, 2018, Anthony became the 21st NBA player to score 25,000 career points. In addition, he has 1,693 playoff points. On March 19, 2018, in a 132–125 victory over the Toronto Raptors, Anthony scored 15 points to up his career total to 25,289, thereby moving past Reggie Miller into 19th place in the NBA career scoring ladder.

On July 25, 2018, the Thunder traded Anthony to the Atlanta Hawks in a three-team trade in which they acquired Dennis Schröder from the Hawks and Timothé Luwawu-Cabarrot from the Philadelphia 76ers. The trade was widely seen as a cost-cutting move, as it saved the Thunder tens of millions of dollars in luxury tax payments. On July 30, Anthony accepted a contract buyout from the Hawks, and was subsequently placed on waivers.

=== Houston Rockets (2018–2019) ===
On August 13, 2018, Anthony signed a one-year, $2.4 million veterans minimum contract with the Houston Rockets coached by his former Knicks coach, Mike D'Antoni. On November 15, Rockets general manager Daryl Morey announced that the team was "parting ways" with Anthony, but had not released him. He played ten games for Houston, starting twice, but he was held out of the last three for what the club called an unspecified "illness." During that absence, much of his playing time went to rookie Gary Clark. Houston had started the season losing seven of their first 11 games. Morey said that Anthony "accepted every role" asked by D'Antoni, but that the "fit we envisioned when Carmelo chose to sign with the Rockets has not materialized; therefore we thought it was best to move on as any other outcome would have been unfair to him." D'Antoni stated that he "didn't ever want to disrespect [Anthony] and his career. He's going in the Hall of Fame."

On January 22, 2019, the Rockets traded Anthony, the draft rights to Jon Diebler, and undisclosed cash considerations to the Chicago Bulls in exchange for the draft rights to Tadija Dragićević. This trade allowed the Rockets to alleviate luxury-tax penalties up to $2.6 million. On February 1, he was waived by the Bulls.

=== Portland Trail Blazers (2019–2021) ===
==== 2019–20 season ====
On November 19, 2019, Anthony was signed by the Portland Trail Blazers to a one-year, non-guaranteed deal. With his last NBA game having been on November 8, 2018, Anthony made his debut as a Blazer in a 115–104 road loss to the New Orleans Pelicans on November 19; he started and had 10 points to go along with 4 rebounds and 1 block in 24 minutes of play. On November 25, Anthony scored a season-high 25 points along with 8 rebounds in a 117–94 road victory over the Chicago Bulls. In the same game, Anthony moved past Alex English into 18th spot on the NBA's all-time scoring list. A couple of days later Anthony was named Western Conference Player of the Week, in the process becoming the oldest player at 35 years old to win the weekly award since Tim Duncan at 38 won it in 2014–15. On December 6, Anthony's contract became fully guaranteed.

On January 1, 2020, Anthony bested his season-high by scoring 26 points in a 117–93 loss to the New York Knicks. On January 7, Anthony recorded a new season-high 28 points and seven rebounds, and hit the game-winning shot in a 101–99 win over the Toronto Raptors. It was Anthony's 26th game winner in the last 30 seconds of a game, better than Kobe Bryant with 22, LeBron James with 20, Dirk Nowitzki with 18 and Dwyane Wade with 16. It was also the 17th time that Anthony has hit a game winner in the last 5 seconds of a game.

On January 15, Anthony recorded his third double-double of the season with 18 points and a season-high 12 rebounds in Portland's 117–107 victory over the Rockets. On January 17, Anthony scored 22 points in a 120–112 loss to the Dallas Mavericks, while becoming the 18th player in NBA history to reach the 26,000 points mark. Anthony scored six points in the Trail Blazers' 125–112 win against the Rockets on January 29, and passed Kevin Garnett for 17th place in the NBA's all-time scoring list with a total of 26,073 points. On February 23, Anthony scored a season-high 32 points in a 107–104 victory against the Detroit Pistons. This was the first time that Anthony scored over 30 points since February 25, 2017, when he was playing for the New York Knicks.

On August 1, 2020, in the team's 1st game in the NBA restart against the Memphis Grizzlies, Anthony scored 21 points. Anthony ultimately tied Chamberlain for No. 8 all-time with 771 career 20-point games when he scored 21, 20, and 26 points against the Los Angeles Clippers, Philadelphia 76ers and Dallas Mavericks in their 5th, 6th and 7th games in the NBA restart.

In the team's sixth game in the NBA restart against the Philadelphia 76ers on August 10, 2020, Anthony scored 20 points with 7 rebounds, 2 steals and a block as he passed Boston Celtics legends John Havlicek for 16th place and ultimately Paul Pierce for 15th in the NBA career scoring ladder with a then-total of 26,411 points. On August 13, 2020, just before the team's last game in the NBA restart against the Brooklyn Nets, Anthony was named the recipient of the 2019–20 Maurice Lucas Award. Anthony finished the first round playoff series with averages of 15.2 points, 5.0 rebounds, 2.0 assists, 1.0 steals and 0.4 blocks in five games.

==== 2020–21 season ====
In November 2020, Anthony re-signed with the Trail Blazers on a one-year contract. On January 1, 2021, in the first game of Portland's back-to-back game with the Golden State Warriors, Anthony scored a then season-high 18 points to move past Tim Duncan into 14th place on the NBA career scoring list. On February 2, Anthony scored 21 points in a game against the Washington Wizards and moved past Dominique Wilkins into 13th place on the NBA all-time scoring list. On February 9, Anthony scored 23 points against the Orlando Magic and moved past Oscar Robertson into 12th place on the NBA all-time career scoring list. On February 11, Anthony scored a then season-high 24 points in the 118–114 win against the Philadelphia 76ers. On March 1, Anthony scored a season-high 29 points in a win against the Charlotte Hornets. On March 13, Anthony scored 26 points to move past Hakeem Olajuwon into 11th place on the NBA career scoring list in a win against the Minnesota Timberwolves. On March 19, Anthony scored 18 points off the bench in a victory over Dallas Mavericks and became 11th NBA player to score over 27,000 points. On May 3, Anthony scored 14 points in the 123–114 loss to the Atlanta Hawks and moved past Elvin Hayes into the 10th place on the NBA all-time career scoring list. After the 2020–21 season, Anthony received the Kareem Abdul-Jabbar Social Justice Champion Award.

=== Los Angeles Lakers (2021–2022) ===
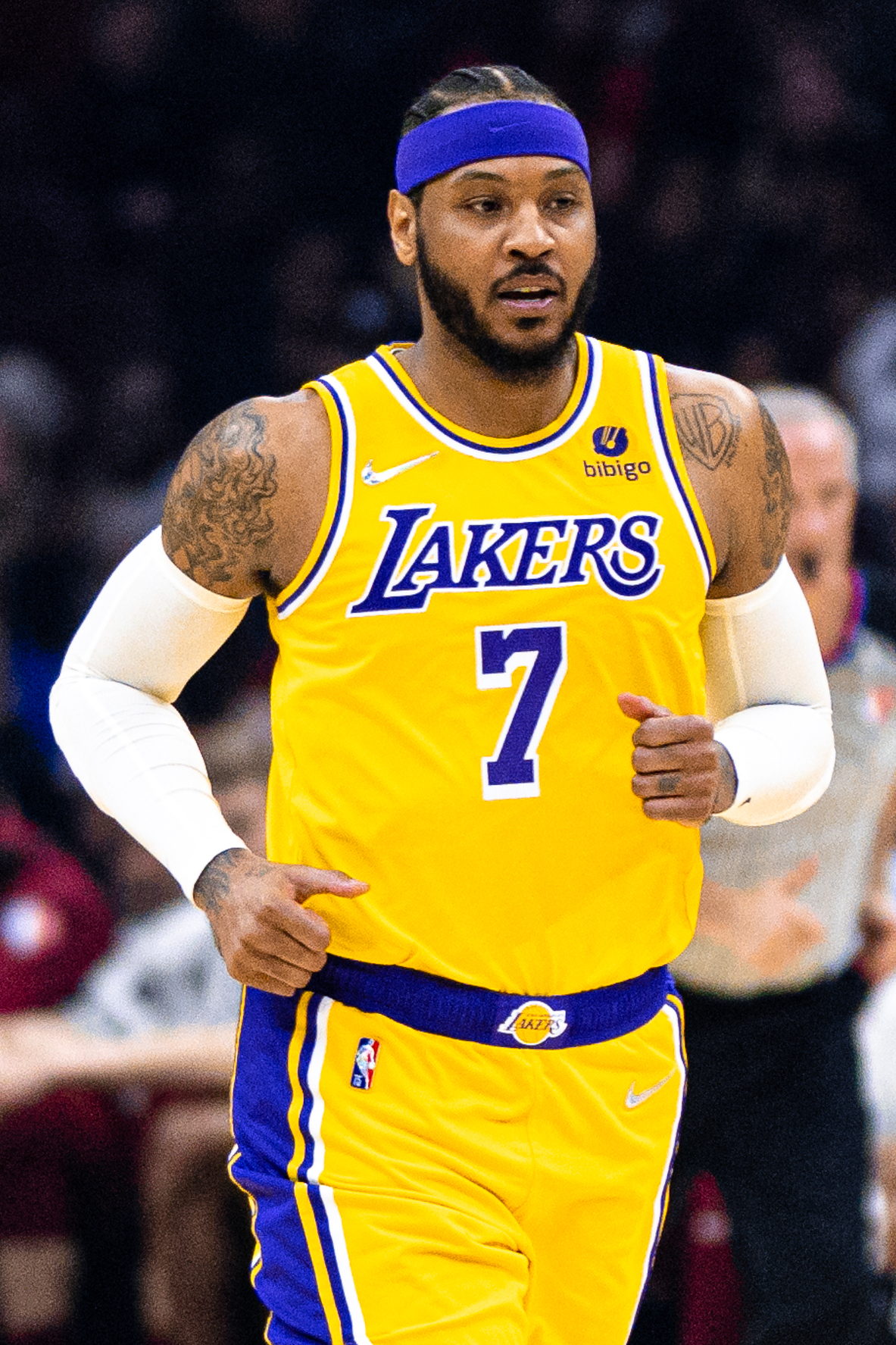
Anthony with the Lakers in 2022

On August 6, 2021, Anthony signed with the Los Angeles Lakers. On October 19, he made his Lakers debut, putting up nine points, four rebounds, and two assists in a 121–114 loss to the Golden State Warriors. On October 24, Anthony put up 28 points in a 121–118 win over the Memphis Grizzlies and moved past Moses Malone into the 9th place on the NBA all-time career scoring list. On January 28, 2022, he scored 19 points in a 117–114 loss to the Charlotte Hornets to become the 9th player in NBA history to reach 28,000 points. Anthony played his final game on April 5, 2022, where he added ten points and six rebounds in a 121–114 loss to the Phoenix Suns. In a disappointing season due to injuries and inconsistency, the Lakers finished with a 33–49 record (11th), and Anthony averaged 13.3 points per game with 37.5 percent three-point shooting in 69 appearances.

=== Retirement ===
On May 22, 2023, Anthony announced his retirement from the NBA. On the same day of his retirement announcement, the team that drafted him, the Denver Nuggets, advanced to their first NBA Finals in franchise history after sweeping the Los Angeles Lakers, the same team Anthony would fall short to in the lone conference finals appearance of his career. Anthony became eligible for induction to the Basketball Hall of Fame in 2025, and has been announced as a member of that year's induction class.

== National team career ==
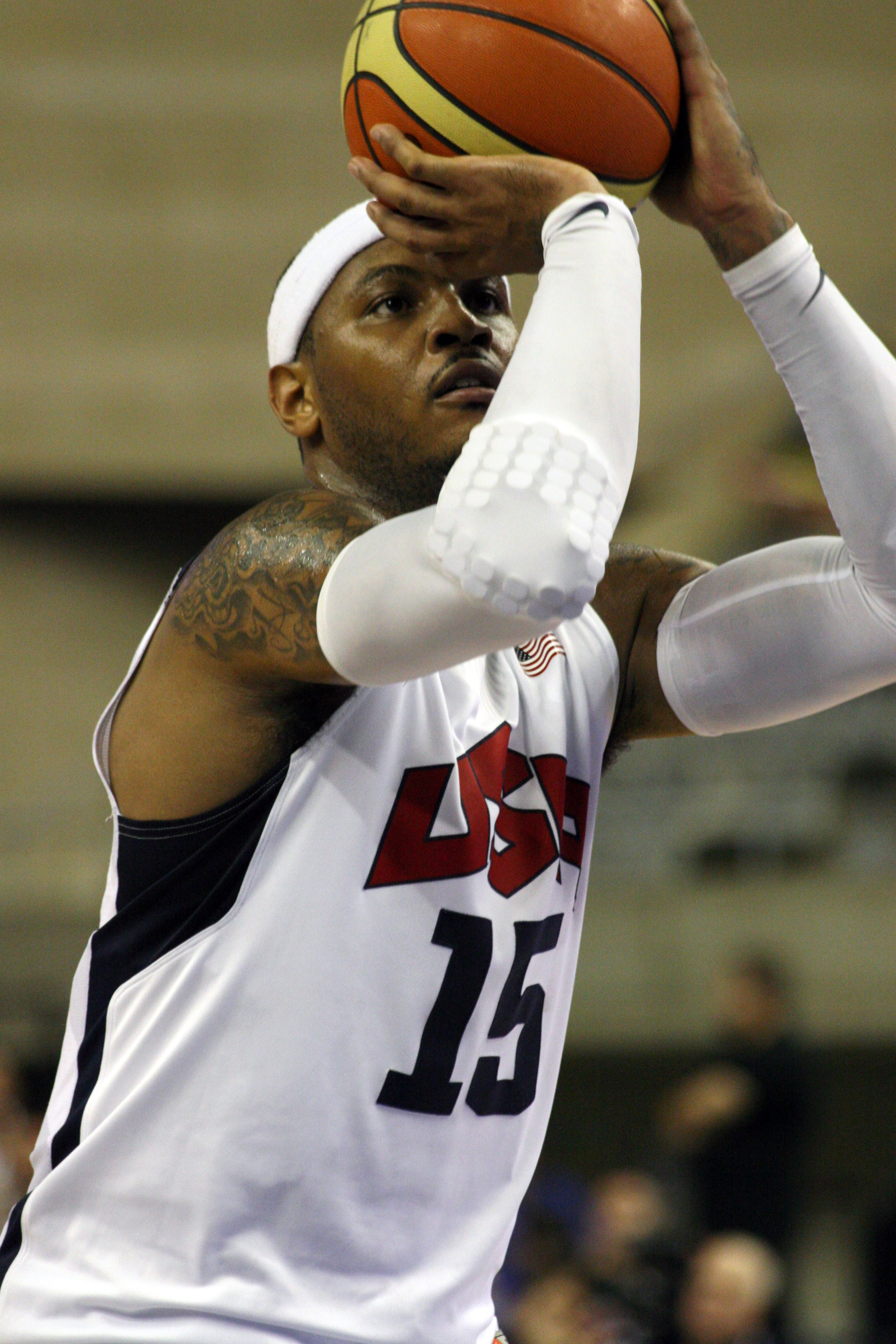
Anthony shoots a free throw as a member of Team USA during the 2012 Summer Olympics.

After his rookie season, Anthony, along with fellow 2003 draftees LeBron James and Dwyane Wade, were chosen as members of the 2004 USA Olympic basketball team alongside veterans Allen Iverson, Stephon Marbury and Tim Duncan that won the bronze medal. He averaged 2.4 points, 1.6 rebounds and 6.8 minutes of playing time while playing in seven of the team's eight games.

In 2006, Anthony was named co-captain (along with James and Wade) of Team USA at the 2006 FIBA World Championship. The team won the bronze medal. On August 23, 2006, Anthony set the U.S. scoring record in a game with 35 points against Italy in the said FIBA tournament. The record was previously held by Kenny Anderson with 34 points in 1990. Anthony was named to the FIBA World Championship All-Tournament Team, posting averages of 19.9 points (led team), 3.7 rebounds and 1.6 assists per game. On January 16, 2006, Anthony was chosen as the USA Basketball Male Athlete of the Year after his performance at the FIBA World Championship.

Anthony was also a member of Team USA during the 2007 FIBA Americas Championship. The team went undefeated, going 10–0. He equaled the previous record of 28 points set by Allen Iverson in a qualifying tournament, which was later broken by James, who scored 31 points in the title-clinching win against Argentina.

Anthony was also named to the 2008 Summer Olympics in Beijing, again alongside James and Wade, with Kobe Bryant and Jason Kidd among others. The team won its games by an average winning margin of 32.2 points, eliminating Australia in the quarterfinals by 31 and beating Argentina by 20 points. Anthony scored 21 points against Argentina, making 3-of-14 field goals and 13-of-13 in free throws, setting USA Olympic game records for made free throws and free throw percentage. In the gold medal game, the United States defeated 2006 World Champion Spain, with Anthony scoring 13 points. Anthony posted averages of 11.5 points, 4.3 rebounds and 1.0 steals per game in eight contests.

Anthony also played in the 2016 Olympic Games, his fourth straight stint in the Olympics, which was a record for a US male basketball player, breaking the old record of having played in three Olympiads he shared with James and Robinson. Team USA won the gold medal when they beat Serbia, 96–66, in the championship game with Anthony becoming the first player in US men's basketball history to win three gold medals. In the gold medal game against Serbia, Anthony collared seven rebounds to finish with 125 total rebounds in US Olympic history, passing Robinson as Team USA's all-time leader in most rebounds. In summary, Anthony caps his Olympic career as the first man to win three gold medals, career leader in scoring, rebounding and games played, with 31, thereby becoming USA basketball's most decorated Olympian. In recognition of his performances and accomplishments in the tournament, Anthony was named co-USA Basketball Male Athlete of the Year (along with Kevin Durant) for the third time in his career.

== Player profile ==
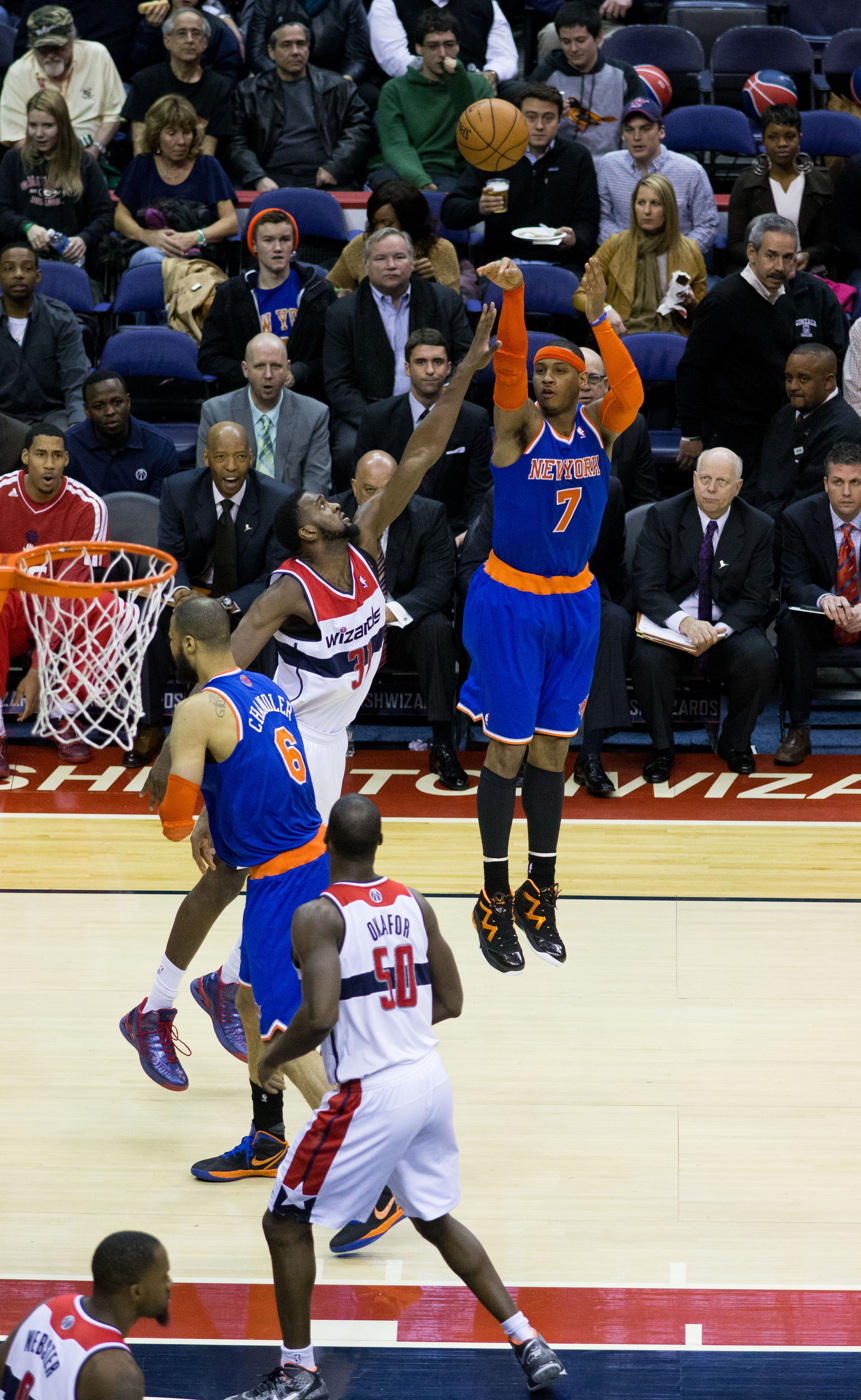
Anthony attempts a mid-range jumpshot as Chris Singleton of the Washington Wizards defends in 2013.

Anthony played the small forward position, but he was also capable of playing power forward. His scoring prowess is considered to have been his best asset with his ability to take over any game on the offensive end; he shares the NBA record for second most points scored in one quarter with 33, and holds the New York Knicks single-game franchise scoring record with 62. On offense, Anthony is recognized for having been a prolific scorer with a variety of crafty offensive moves. Listed at 6 ft 7 in (2.01 m) and 238 pounds (108 kg), he had strength and quickness to be an immediate and consistent scoring threat in the post. He also liked creating space from his defenders which allowed him to step into his jump shot or put the ball on the floor and drive to the basket and get to the free throw line. Anthony is often known for having been one of the premier clutch performers in the NBA; during the 2005–06 season, Anthony made five game-winning shots in the last five seconds of the fourth quarter or overtime. Dave McMenamin, a staff writer for ESPN, wrote, "If you were going to choose one player to challenge Bryant for his title of Mr. Clutch, it would have to be Anthony." Despite having been a prolific scorer, he was criticized for his defense and was never named to the NBA All-Defensive Team.

Anthony was one of many NBA players who used Idan Ravin as a personal coach and trainer. His relationship with Ravin started when he was 18 years old and preparing for the NBA draft after spending his one year at Syracuse University.

== Career statistics ==
Legend
GP	Games played	GS	Games started	MPG	Minutes per game
FG%	Field goal percentage	3P%	3-point field goal percentage	FT%	Free throw percentage
RPG	Rebounds per game	APG	Assists per game	SPG	Steals per game
BPG	Blocks per game	PPG	Points per game	**Bold**	Career high
*	Led the league

=== NBA ===
==== Regular season ====
Year	Team	GP	GS	MPG	FG%	3P%	FT%	RPG	APG	SPG	BPG	PPG
2003–04	Denver	**82**	**82**	36.5	.426	.322	.777	6.1	2.8	1.2	.5	21.0
2004–05	Denver	75	75	34.8	.431	.266	.796	5.7	2.6	.9	.4	20.8
2005–06	Denver	80	80	36.8	.481	.243	.808	4.9	2.7	1.1	.5	26.5
2006–07	Denver	65	65	38.2	.476	.268	.808	6.0	3.8	1.2	.4	**28.9**
2007–08	Denver	77	77	36.4	**.492**	.354	.786	7.4	3.4	**1.3**	.5	25.7
2008–09	Denver	66	66	34.3	.443	.371	.793	6.8	3.4	1.1	.4	22.8
2009–10	Denver	69	69	38.2	.458	.316	.830	6.6	3.2	**1.3**	.4	28.2
2010–11	Denver	50	50	35.5	.452	.333	.823	7.6	2.8	.9	.6	25.2
2010–11	New York	27	27	36.2	.461	**.424**	.872	6.7	3.0	.9	.6	26.3
2011–12	New York	55	55	34.1	.430	.335	.804	6.3	3.6	1.1	.4	22.6
2012–13	New York	67	67	37.0	.449	.379	.830	6.9	2.6	.8	.5	28.7*
2013–14	New York	77	77	**38.7***	.452	.402	.848	**8.1**	3.1	1.2	.7	27.4
2014–15	New York	40	40	35.7	.444	.341	.797	6.6	3.1	1.0	.4	24.2
2015–16	New York	72	72	35.1	.434	.339	.829	7.7	**4.2**	.9	.5	21.8
2016–17	New York	74	74	34.3	.433	.360	.833	5.9	2.9	.8	.4	22.4
2017–18	Oklahoma City	78	78	32.1	.404	.357	.767	5.8	1.3	.6	.6	16.2
2018–19	Houston	10	2	29.4	.405	.328	.682	5.4	.5	.4	.7	13.4
2019–20	Portland	58	58	32.8	.430	.385	.845	6.3	1.5	.8	.5	15.4
2020–21	Portland	69	3	24.5	.421	.409	**.890**	3.1	1.5	.7	.6	13.4
2021–22	L.A. Lakers	69	3	26.0	.441	.375	.830	4.2	1.0	.7	**.8**	13.3
Career		1,260	1,120	34.5	.447	.355	.814	6.2	2.7	1.0	.5	22.5
All-Star		10	8	26.2	.507	.327	.727	7.5	1.1	.5	.3	18.5

==== Playoffs ====
Year	Team	GP	GS	MPG	FG%	3P%	FT%	RPG	APG	SPG	BPG	PPG
2004	Denver	4	4	35.8	.328	.182	.800	8.3	2.8	1.3	.0	15.0
2005	Denver	5	5	36.0	.422	.000	.813	5.4	2.0	.6	.2	19.2
2006	Denver	5	5	38.6	.333	.000	.750	6.6	2.8	.8	.2	21.0
2007	Denver	5	5	42.0	**.480**	**.500**	.795	8.6	1.2	1.0	.0	26.8
2008	Denver	4	4	36.5	.364	.250	.828	9.5	2.0	.5	.3	22.5
2009	Denver	**16**	**16**	38.3	.453	.364	.826	5.8	4.1	1.8	.6	27.2
2010	Denver	6	6	**42.3**	.464	.316	.877	8.5	3.3	**2.0**	.5	**30.7**
2011	New York	4	4	39.0	.375	.346	.853	**10.3**	**4.8**	1.3	**.8**	26.0
2012	New York	5	5	40.8	.419	.222	.756	8.2	2.2	1.2	.2	27.8
2013	New York	12	12	40.1	.406	.298	.885	6.6	1.6	1.1	.2	28.8
2018	Oklahoma City	6	6	32.3	.375	.214	.733	5.7	.3	1.8	.7	11.8
2020	Portland	5	5	35.2	.412	.421	.857	5.0	2.0	1.0	.4	15.2
2021	Portland	6	0	23.8	.417	.378	**.909**	3.2	1.5	.3	.2	12.3
Career		83	77	37.3	.414	.324	.826	6.7	2.5	1.2	.3	23.1

=== College ===
Year	Team	GP	GS	MPG	FG%	3P%	FT%	RPG	APG	SPG	BPG	PPG
2002–03	Syracuse	35	35	36.4	.453	.337	.706	10.0	2.2	1.6	.9	22.2

== Personal life ==
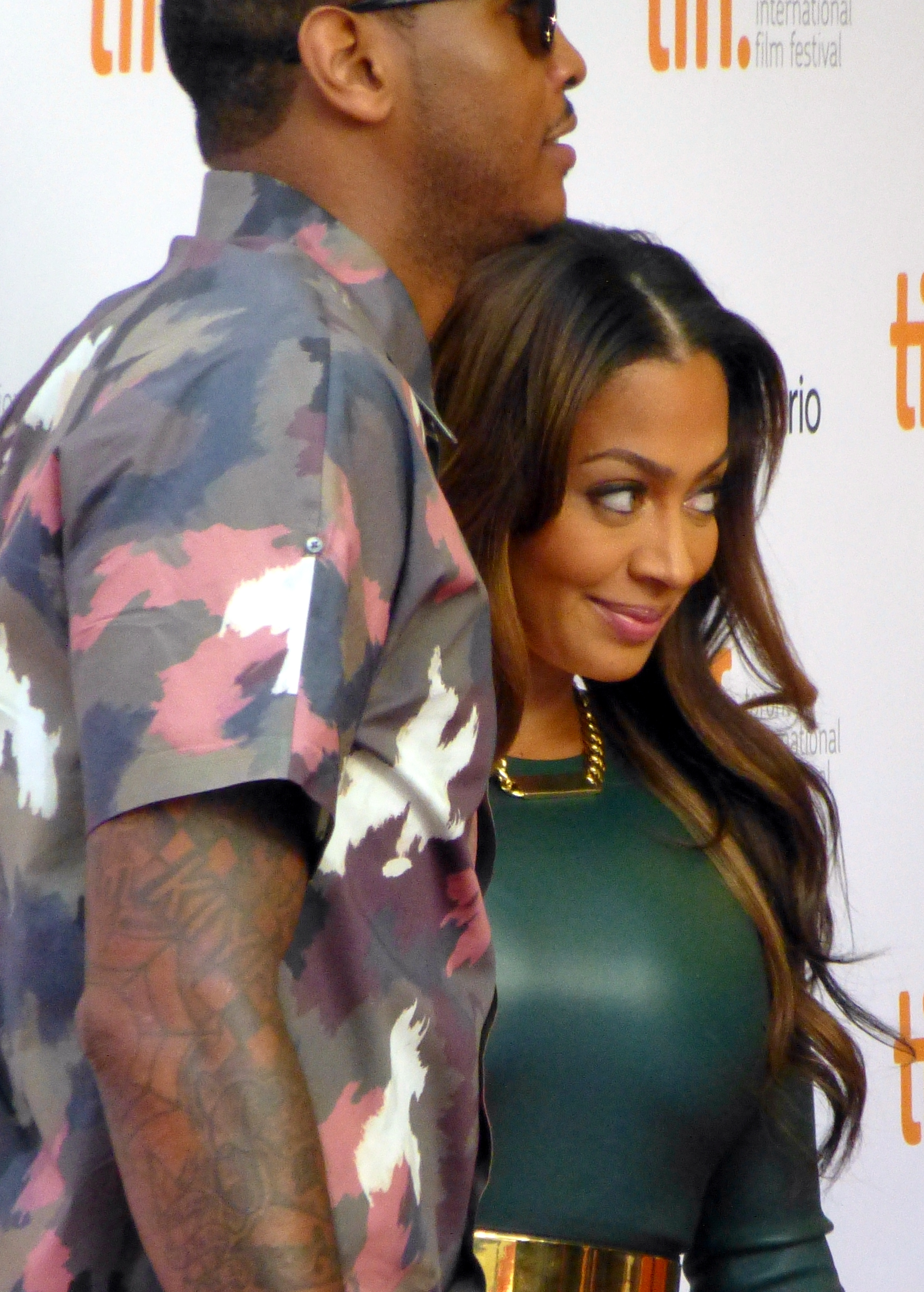
Anthony with his wife La La

Anthony has two brothers, Robert and Wilford, and a half-sister, Daphne. He had another sister, Michelle, who died in 2010. His mother, Mary, is African American and his father, Carmelo Iriarte, was Puerto Rican.

Anthony, along with LeBron James, Chris Paul, and Dwyane Wade, are a quartet referred to as the "banana boat crew". The four have been friends since they were teenagers, and have consistently gone on vacation together. During an excursion to the Bahamas, James rescued Anthony from the water when Anthony was carried away from the boat by the current. During an Instagram Live session, Anthony later recounted, "He saved my life", when asked about the danger he was in prior to the rescue.

Anthony was cited for marijuana possession in 2004, but charges were dropped. On December 16, 2006, Anthony was involved in the infamous Knicks–Nuggets brawl during a game at Madison Square Garden. He was suspended for 15 games as a result. On April 14, 2008, Anthony was arrested on suspicion of driving under the influence. The Nuggets suspended Anthony for two games due to the arrest.

In 2004, Anthony became engaged to Alani "La La" Vazquez. Their son, Kiyan Carmelo Anthony, was born on March 7, 2007. Michael Eric Dyson married Anthony and La La on July 10, 2010, at Cipriani's in New York City before 320 guests. VH1 filmed the ceremony for use in a reality series on the couple, titled La La's Full Court Wedding. Anthony resides in Portland, Oregon. He sold his New York property in 2020.

Shortly after the end of the 2016–17 regular season, TMZ reported that La La had moved out of the couple's apartment and the two were living separately. The two reconciled in December 2018. In June 2021, La La filed for divorce.

== Charity work ==
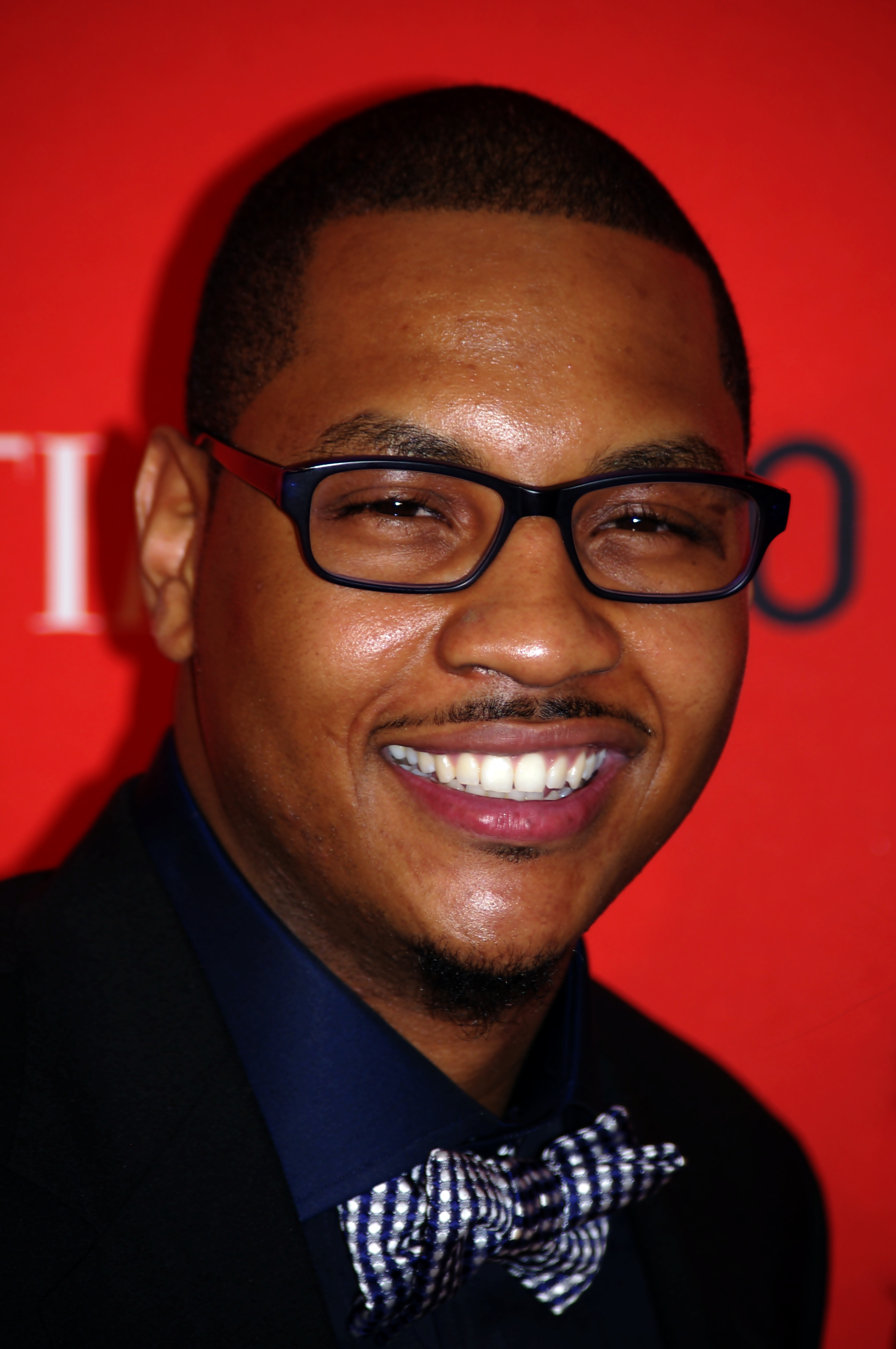
Anthony at the 2011 Time 100 gala

In Denver, Anthony was a spokesman for the Family Resource Center and helped organize a Christmas party, entitled "A Very Melo Christmas", for less well-off children. In Baltimore, Anthony hosts an annual 3-on-3 tournament, known as "Melo's H.O.O.D. (Holding Our Own Destiny) Movement 3 on 3 Challenge" and is helping fund the revitalization of a local community center for local youth. Anthony opened "The Carmelo Anthony Youth Development Center" in Baltimore on December 14, 2006. He contributed $1.5 million to the Living Classrooms Foundation, a non-profit organization that "provides innovative hands-on-education, job-training, and community service programs for over 35,000 children, youth and young adults in the east Baltimore community."

After the tsunami caused by the 2004 Indian Ocean earthquake, Anthony donated $35,000 to relief efforts. He donated $1,000 per point scored against San Antonio and Houston on January 8 and 9, 2005, respectively. Anthony also committed $3 million toward the construction of a newly planned basketball practice facility at his alma mater, Syracuse University. According to the NBA's official website, "Anthony's gift represents one of the largest individual donations to Syracuse University Athletics and is also believed to be one of largest by a current professional athlete to the school they attended." The practice facility will be called the Carmelo K. Anthony Basketball Center. For charitable contributions totaling $4,282,000, Anthony was listed as number eight in "The Giving Back 30 List of Largest Charitable Donations by Celebrities in 2006".

== Other activities ==
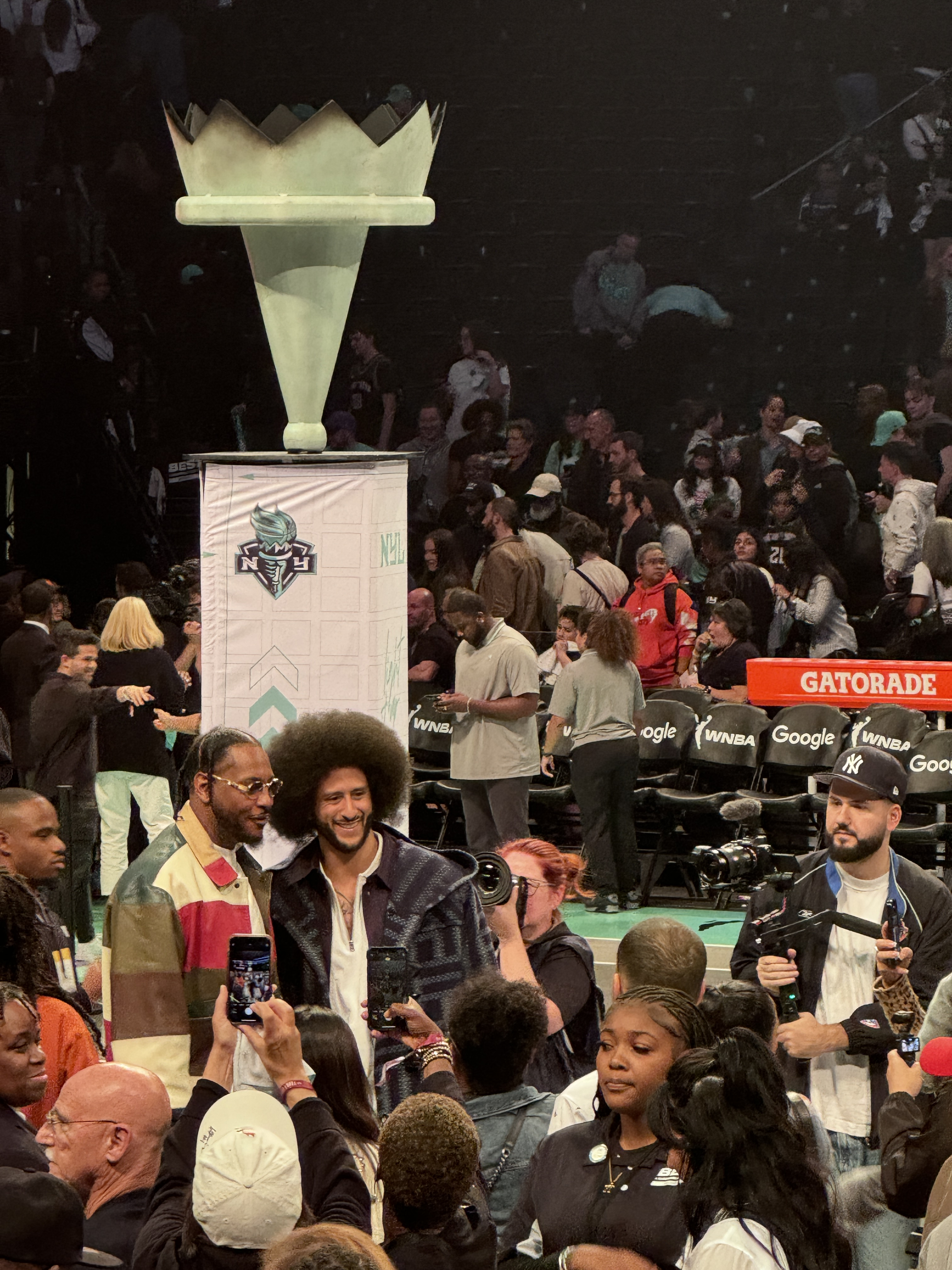
Carmelo Anthony poses with Colin Kaepernick after a New York Liberty /Las Vegas Aces WNBA Semifinals game, October 1, 2024.

Anthony was a guest star in the "Lost and Found" episode of Ned's Declassified School Survival Guide. He also appeared in the music video for Common's song "Be" from the album Be in 2005. Anthony is the only player to appear on the cover of all three EA Sports basketball franchises (NCAA March Madness, NBA Live and NBA Street). In January 2009, Colorado Sports Hall of Fame selected Anthony as its professional athlete of the year for 2008. He and wrestler Henry Cejudo, also a 2008 gold medalist, were chosen to be the special award headliners for the induction banquet held on April 14, 2009. In spring 2012, Anthony guest starred in several episodes of the Showtime series Nurse Jackie as a professional baseball player going through drug rehab. He, along with Dwight Howard and Scottie Pippen, also appeared in the 2013 Chinese film Amazing, a joint venture between the NBA and Shanghai Film Group Corporation.

In 2003, Anthony signed his first shoe deal with Jordan brand and was paid $3.5 million per year for six years. In 2004, his first signature shoe, the Jordan Carmelo 1.5, was released. As of 2018, thirteen shoes have been released in the Melo line.

Anthony appeared in a video entitled Stop Snitchin' in 2004, which warned that residents of Baltimore who collaborated with the police would face violence. He later distanced himself from this video.

In 2006, Anthony partnered with Hemelgarn Racing to campaign a car driven by P. J. Chesson in the 2006 IndyCar Series season. Jeff Bucknum joined the team as a second team car, and under the moniker "Car-Melo", the two cars qualified for the 2006 Indianapolis 500. However, the team dismantled after a crash of both cars in the Indy 500.

In 2014, Anthony made a brief cameo appearance in the eighth episode of the seventh and final season FX series Sons of Anarchy as a henchman to series antagonist Moses Cartwright. He also participated in a merchandising cooperation with Nickelodeon for the Teenage Mutant Ninja Turtles franchise, where he has several guest appearances, namely in the 2016 action film and as a comic character in the Amazing Adventures spin-off comics to the 2012 TV series.

In 2015, Anthony founded North American Soccer League expansion club Puerto Rico FC. Despite the financial recession in Puerto Rico, Anthony saw this opportunity as a form of community outreach, as well as a long-term investment in a club that could ultimately be profitable. Anthony is also a fan of English football club Arsenal.

In April 2021, Anthony launched a production company called Creative 7, which was named after his New York Knicks jersey number 7, which he wore from 2011 to 2017.

In November 2023, both Anthony and The Kid Mero launched a weekly podcast called 7PM in Brooklyn with Carmelo Anthony & the Kid Mero.

Anthony has written two books. He co-authored the book Carmelo Anthony: It's Just The Beginning (published in 2004) with Greg Brown. It describes his rise from the streets of Baltimore to the NBA. He also wrote a memoir titled Where Tomorrows Aren't Promised: A Memoir of Survival and Hope (published in 2022). Co-written with D. Watkins, it focuses on his challenging upbringing in the housing projects of Red Hook, Brooklyn, and Baltimore. It covers themes of poverty, racism and violence.

In May 2026, Carmelo Anthony joined Utopai Studios as a strategic partner to develop athlete-led entertainment content and media franchises.

== See also ==
- List of NBA seasons played leaders
- List of NBA career games played leaders
- List of NBA career scoring leaders
- List of NBA career personal fouls leaders
- List of NBA career 3-point scoring leaders
- List of NBA career free throw scoring leaders
- List of NBA career minutes played leaders
- List of NBA single-game scoring leaders
- List of NBA annual scoring leaders
- List of NBA annual minutes played leaders
- List of Puerto Ricans
- List of African-Americans
- List of people banned or suspended by the NBA
