= 1999–2000 San Antonio Spurs season =

- Head coach: Gregg Popovich
- General manager: Gregg Popovich
- Owner: Peter Holt
- Arena: Alamodome

Results
- Record: 53–29 (.646)
- Place: Division: 2nd (Midwest); Conference: 4th (Western)
- Playoff finish: First round (lost to Suns 1–3)
- Stats at Basketball Reference

Local media
- Television: Fox Sports Net Southwest, KRRT, KSAT-TV
- Radio: KLEY

The 1999–2000 San Antonio Spurs season was the 24th season for the San Antonio Spurs in the National Basketball Association, their 27th season as the Spurs, and their 33rd season as a franchise. The Spurs entered the regular season as the reigning champions, having won their first NBA championship in the 1999 NBA Finals, where they defeated the New York Knicks in five games.

== Season summary ==
=== Off-season ===
During the off-season, the Spurs signed free agents Terry Porter, Samaki Walker and Chucky Brown. However, prior to the regular season, Sean Elliott was diagnosed with a kidney disorder, and missed the first four months of the season; he would then receive a kidney transplant from his brother, Noel.

The Spurs were originally scheduled to play two games against the Minnesota Timberwolves overseas in Tokyo, Japan in November during the first month of the regular season, but because they won the NBA championship, they were obligated to play in the McDonald's Championship in Milan, Italy in October.

=== Regular season ===
With the addition of Porter, the Spurs got off to a fast start by winning 14 of their first 17 games of the regular season, which included a seven-game winning streak between November and December, and later on held a 32–17 record at the All-Star break. At mid-season, Brown was released to free agency after 30 games, and re-signed with his former team, the Charlotte Hornets. On March 14, 2000, Elliott returned to the team to play in a home game against the Atlanta Hawks, in which the Spurs won at the Alamodome, 94–79; Elliott played in the final 19 games of the season. The Spurs won six of their final seven games, and finished in second place in the Midwest Division with a 53–29 record, earning the fourth seed in the Western Conference.

Tim Duncan averaged 23.2 points, 12.4 rebounds and 2.2 blocks per game, and was named to the All-NBA First Team, and to the NBA All-Defensive First Team, while David Robinson averaged 17.8 points, 9.6 rebounds and 2.3 blocks per game, and was named to the All-NBA Third Team. In addition, Avery Johnson provided the team with 11.2 points and 6.0 assists per game, while Porter contributed 9.4 points and 3.3 assists per game, and Mario Elie provided with 7.5 points per game. Meanwhile, Malik Rose averaged 6.7 points and 4.5 rebounds per game, while three-point specialist Jaren Jackson contributed 6.3 points per game, and led the Spurs with 108 three-point field goals, Elliot averaged 6.0 points per game, Walker provided with 5.1 points and 3.8 rebounds per game, and Jerome Kersey contributed 4.5 points per game.

During the NBA All-Star weekend at The Arena in Oakland in Oakland, California, Duncan and Robinson were both selected for the 2000 NBA All-Star Game, as members of the Western Conference All-Star team. Duncan scored 24 points along with 14 rebounds, as he and Shaquille O'Neal of the Los Angeles Lakers both shared the NBA All-Star Game Most Valuable Player award, as the Western Conference defeated the Eastern Conference, 137–126. Meanwhile, Porter participated in the NBA Three-Point Shootout for the third time. Duncan also finished in fifth place in Most Valuable Player voting, while Elliott finished tied in eleventh place in Most Improved Player voting.

The Spurs finished second in the NBA in home-game attendance behind the Chicago Bulls, with an attendance of 884,450 at the Alamodome during the regular season.

=== NBA playoffs ===
In the Western Conference First Round of the 2000 NBA playoffs, the Spurs faced off against the 5th–seeded Phoenix Suns, a team that featured Clifford Robinson, Penny Hardaway, and All-Star guard Jason Kidd. Despite both teams finishing with the same regular-season record, the Spurs had home-court advantage in the series. However, shortly before the regular season ended, Duncan suffered a season-ending left knee injury.

Without Duncan, the Spurs lost Game 1 to the Suns at home, 72–70 at the Alamodome, but managed to win Game 2 at home, 85–70 to even the series. However, the Spurs lost the next two games to the Suns on the road, which included a Game 4 loss at the America West Arena, 89–78, in which Kidd returned from an ankle injury; the Spurs lost the series to the Suns in four games. This was the first time that the Spurs lost in the opening round of the NBA playoffs since the 1993–94 season.

=== Aftermath ===
Following the season, Elie signed as a free agent with the Phoenix Suns, and Kersey signed with the Milwaukee Bucks during the next season.

== Draft picks ==
Round	Pick	Player	Position	Nationality	College
1	29	Leon Smith	PF	United States	Martin Luther King HS (IL)
2	57	Manu Ginóbili	SG	Argentina	

== Roster ==
1999–2000 San Antonio Spurs roster
Players

Pos.	No.	Player	Height	Weight	DOB	From
G	33	Antonio Daniels	6 ft 4 in (1.93 m)	205 lb (93 kg)	1975–03–19	Bowling Green
G	5	Derrick Dial	6 ft 4 in (1.93 m)	184 lb (83 kg)	1975–12–20	Eastern Michigan
F/C	21	Tim Duncan (injured)	6 ft 11 in (2.11 m)	250 lb (113 kg)	1976–04–25	Wake Forest
G/F	17	Mario Elie	6 ft 5 in (1.96 m)	210 lb (95 kg)	1963–11–26	American International
F	32	Sean Elliott	6 ft 8 in (2.03 m)	205 lb (93 kg)	1968–02–02	Arizona
G	2	Jaren Jackson	6 ft 4 in (1.93 m)	190 lb (86 kg)	1967–10–27	Georgetown
G	6	Avery Johnson	5 ft 10 in (1.78 m)	175 lb (79 kg)	1965–03–25	Southern
G	4	Steve Kerr	6 ft 3 in (1.91 m)	175 lb (79 kg)	1965–09–27	Arizona
F	25	Jerome Kersey	6 ft 7 in (2.01 m)	215 lb (98 kg)	1962–06–26	Longwood
G	30	Terry Porter	6 ft 3 in (1.91 m)	195 lb (88 kg)	1963–04–08	UW–Stevens Point
C	50	David Robinson	7 ft 1 in (2.16 m)	235 lb (107 kg)	1965–08–06	Navy
F	31	Malik Rose	6 ft 7 in (2.01 m)	250 lb (113 kg)	1974–11–23	Drexel
C	16	Felton Spencer	7 ft 0 in (2.13 m)	265 lb (120 kg)	1968–01–05	Louisville
F/C	55	Samaki Walker	6 ft 9 in (2.06 m)	250 lb (113 kg)	1976–02–25	Louisville

Coaches
Head coach
- Gregg Popovich
Assistant(s)
- Mike Budenholzer
- Hank Egan
- Paul Pressey

Legend
- (DP) Unsigned draft pick
- (FA) Free agent
- (S) Suspended
- Injured

Roster

== Regular season ==
=== Season standings ===
Midwest Division	W	L	PCT	GB	Home	Road	Div
y-Utah Jazz	55	27	.671	–	31–10	24–17	14–10
x-San Antonio Spurs	53	29	.646	2	31–10	22–19	16–8
x-Minnesota Timberwolves	50	32	.610	5	26–15	24–17	18–6
Dallas Mavericks	40	42	.488	15	22–19	18–23	12–12
Denver Nuggets	35	47	.427	20	25–16	10–31	10–14
Houston Rockets	34	48	.415	21	22–19	12–29	8–16
Vancouver Grizzlies	22	60	.268	33	12–29	10–31	6–18

#	Western Conference				
#	Team	W	L	PCT	GB
1	z-Los Angeles Lakers	67	15	.817	–
2	y-Utah Jazz	55	27	.671	12
3	x-Portland Trail Blazers	59	23	.720	8
4	x-San Antonio Spurs	53	29	.646	14
5	x-Phoenix Suns	53	29	.646	14
6	x-Minnesota Timberwolves	50	32	.610	17
7	x-Seattle SuperSonics	45	37	.549	22
8	x-Sacramento Kings	44	38	.537	23
9	Dallas Mavericks	40	42	.488	27
10	Denver Nuggets	35	47	.427	32
11	Houston Rockets	34	48	.415	33
12	Vancouver Grizzlies	22	60	.268	45
13	Golden State Warriors	19	63	.232	48
14	Los Angeles Clippers	15	67	.183	52

z – clinched division title
y – clinched division title
x – clinched playoff spot

=== Regular season ===
1999–2000 game log
Total: 53–29 (home: 31–10; road: 22–19)
November: 13–3 (home: 8–0; road: 5–3)

Game	Date	Team	Score	High points	High rebounds	High assists	Location Attendance	Record
1	November 2	Philadelphia	W 89–76	Tim Duncan (20)	Tim Duncan (16)	Avery Johnson (6)	Alamodome; 27,288	1–0
2	November 4	Golden State	W 104–81	David Robinson (19)	Tim Duncan (14)	Terry Porter (6)	Alamodome; 14,508	2–0
3	November 5	@ Houston	W 95–85	Terry Porter (18)	David Robinson (11)	Avery Johnson (9)	Compaq Center; 16,285	3–0
4	November 7	@ Phoenix	L 74–77	Tim Duncan (15)	Tim Duncan (17)	Avery Johnson (6)	America West Arena; 19,023	3–1
5	November 9	@ Golden State	W 118–89	Malik Rose (21)	Tim Duncan (11)	Tim Duncan, Jaren Jackson (5)	The Arena in Oakland; 11,601	4–1
6	November 10	@ L. A. Clippers	W 99–94	Tim Duncan (22)	Tim Duncan (17)	Avery Johnson (6)	Reunion Arena; 11,118	5–1
7	November 13	Charlotte	W 95–79	Tim Duncan (22)	Tim Duncan (12)	Avery Johnson (12)	Alamodome; 19,669	6–1
8	November 15	@ Utah	L 85–91	Tim Duncan (32)	David Robinson (10)	Avery Johnson, Terry Porter (3)	Alamodome; 19,584	6–2
9	November 16	Indiana	W 90–87 (OT)	Tim Duncan, David Robinson (22)	Tim Duncan (15)	Terry Porter (5)	Alamodome; 15,905	7–2
10	November 18	@ Milwaukee	L 88–99	Tim Duncan (29)	Tim Duncan (14)	Avery Johnson (6)	Bradley Center; 15,184	7–3
11	November 20	Dallas	W 106–90	Jaren Jackson (23)	Tim Duncan (17)	Avery Johnson (8)	Alamodome; 16,596	8–3
12	November 22	@ Philadelphia	W 94–91	Tim Duncan (26)	Tim Duncan (17)	Avery Johnson (6)	First Union Center; 16,553	9–3
13	November 24	@ Boston	W 121–98	Tim Duncan (31)	Tim Duncan (15)	Avery Johnson (9)	FleetCenter; 17,426	10–3
14	November 26	Chicago	W 101–78	Tim Duncan (23)	Tim Duncan (10)	Avery Johnson (5)	Alamodome; 24,919	11–3
15	November 27	Denver	W 106–87	Malik Rose (21)	Tim Duncan (17)	Avery Johnson (8)	Alamodome; 22,188	12–3
16	November 30	Detroit	W 106–87	Tim Duncan (28)	Tim Duncan (10)	Mario Elie (7)	Alamodome; 18,328	13–3

December: 8–7 (home: 4–2; road: 4–5)

Game	Date	Team	Score	High points	High rebounds	High assists	Location Attendance	Record
17	December 2	@ New Jersey	W 96–94	David Robinson (27)	David Robinson (13)	Avery Johnson (7)	Continental Airlines Arena; 13,626	14–3
18	December 3	@ Detroit	L 80–102	David Robinson (15)	Tim Duncan (12)	Avery Johnson (6)	The Palace of Auburn Hills; 18,338	14–4
19	December 5	@ Toronto	L 92–98	Tim Duncan (27)	Tim Duncan (13)	Mario Elie (6)	Air Canada Centre; 18,455	14–5
20	December 7	@ Indiana	L 77–83	Tim Duncan (30)	David Robinson (17)	Tim Duncan, Terry Porter (4)	Conseco Fieldhouse; 18,345	14–6
21	December 9	Vancouver	W 99–91	Tim Duncan (42)	Tim Duncan (14)	Avery Johnson (6)	Alamodome; 14,778	15–6
22	December 11	Washington	L 89–99	Tim Duncan (23)	Tim Duncan (13)	Avery Johnson (4)	Alamodome; 17,187	15–7
23	December 14	@ Dallas	W 111–93	Tim Duncan (29)	Tim Duncan (12)	Jaren Jackson (7)	Reunion Arena; 13,685	16–7
24	December 15	Houston	W 83–77	Tim Duncan (20)	Tim Duncan (10)	Terry Porter (5)	Alamodome; 23,837	17–7
25	December 17	Boston	W 103–94	Tim Duncan (30)	Tim Duncan (17)	Avery Johnson (6)	Alamodome; 17,264	18–7
26	December 18	@ Denver	L 84–86	Tim Duncan (33)	David Robinson (12)	Avery Johnson (5)	Pepsi Center; 17,318	18–8
27	December 21	Phoenix	W 91–90 (OT)	Tim Duncan (25)	Tim Duncan (16)	Avery Johnson (7)	Alamodome; 23,480	19–8
28	December 23	Milwaukee	L 91–94	Tim Duncan (18)	Tim Duncan (15)	Avery Johnson (10)	Alamodome; 22,581	19–9
29	December 25	@ L. A. Lakers	L 93–99	Tim Duncan (28)	David Robinson (19)	Avery Johnson (6)	STAPLES Center; 18,997	19–10
30	December 27	@ Golden State	W 105–83	David Robinson (28)	David Robinson (14)	Avery Johnson (9)	The Arena in Oakland; 12,447	20–10
31	December 30	@ Vancouver	W 98–88	Tim Duncan (32)	Tim Duncan (15)	Tim Duncan (4)	General Motors Place; 14,403	21–10

January: 7–6 (home: 5–2; road: 2–4)

Game	Date	Team	Score	High points	High rebounds	High assists	Location Attendance	Record
32	January 4	@ Minnesota	L 88–91	Tim Duncan (27)	Tim Duncan (19)	Tim Duncan, Avery Johnson (5)	Target Center; 15,179	21–11
33	January 5	Seattle	L 96–99	Tim Duncan (24)	Tim Duncan (12)	Avery Johnson (9)	Alamodome; 14,741	21–12
34	January 7	@ Phoenix	W 102–83	David Robinson (24)	Tim Duncan (15)	Tim Duncan, Avery Johnson (5)	America West Arena; 19,023	22–12
35	January 8	Orlando	W 127–92	Tim Duncan (22)	David Robinson (13)	Terry Porter (6)	Alamodome; 20,131	23–12
36	January 10	Utah	W 93–86	Tim Duncan (46)	Tim Duncan (14)	Avery Johnson (6)	Alamodome; 17,944	24–12
37	January 13	@ Sacramento	L 103–107	Tim Duncan (33)	Tim Duncan (20)	Avery Johnson (6)	ARCO Arena; 17,317	24–13
38	January 14	@ Seattle	L 85–91	Tim Duncan (32)	Tim Duncan (16)	Avery Johnson (7)	KeyArena; 17,072	24–14
39	January 17	@ L. A. Clippers	W 99–93	David Robinson (38)	Tim Duncan (13)	Avery Johnson (9)	STAPLES Center; 14,264	25–14
40	January 19	Portland	L 95–105	David Robinson (29)	David Robinson (12)	Terry Porter (7)	Alamodome; 20,638	25–15
41	January 22	New York	W 96–83	Tim Duncan (33)	Tim Duncan (15)	Avery Johnson (6)	Alamodome; 34,429	26–15
42	January 25	L. A. Clippers	W 105–82	Tim Duncan (24)	Tim Duncan, David Robinson (13)	Antonio Daniels, Terry Porter (6)	Alamodome; 14,800	27–15
43	January 27	Minnesota	W 92–80	Tim Duncan (20)	Tim Duncan (14)	Avery Johnson (8)	Alamodome; 15,911	28–15
44	January 29	@ Portland	L 67–81	Avery Johnson (15)	David Robinson (10)	Avery Johnson (5)	Rose Garden Arena; 20,584	28–16

February: 9–4 (home: 5–1; road: 4–3)

Game	Date	Team	Score	High points	High rebounds	High assists	Location Attendance	Record
45	February 1	L. A. Lakers	W 105–81	Tim Duncan (29)	Tim Duncan (18)	Avery Johnson (9)	Alamodome; 25,589	29–16
46	February 3	Toronto	W 112–95	Tim Duncan (32)	Tim Duncan (17)	Tim Duncan, Antonio Daniels (7)	Alamodome; 19,048	30–16
47	February 6	@ Utah	L 90–93	Tim Duncan (32)	Tim Duncan (10)	Avery Johnson (6)	Delta Center; 18,981	30–17
48	February 8	Seattle	W 79–77	Tim Duncan (22)	David Robinson (11)	Avery Johnson (5)	Alamodome; 16,373	31–17
49	February 9	@ Denver	W 106–97	David Robinson (30)	Tim Duncan (13)	Avery Johnson (8)	Pepsi Center; 16,607	32–17
All-Star Break
50	February 15	@ Cleveland	L 81–92	Tim Duncan (21)	David Robinson (11)	Avery Johnson (10)	Gund Arena; 15,142	32–18
51	February 18	Houston	W 116–92	Tim Duncan (19)	Tim Duncan (8)	Avery Johnson (8)	Alamodome; 26,846	33–18
52	February 20	@ Houston	W 113–111 (OT)	Tim Duncan (25)	Tim Duncan (11)	Avery Johnson (13)	Compaq Center; 16,285	34–18
53	February 21	Phoenix	L 89–98	David Robinson (31)	David Robinson (18)	Terry Porter (7)	Alamodome; 17,049	34–19
54	February 24	@ Charlotte	W 72–70	David Robinson (16)	Tim Duncan (12)	Avery Johnson (7)	Charlotte Coliseum; 18,535	35–19
55	February 25	@ Chicago	W 91–78	David Robinson (23)	Malik Rose (11)	Avery Johnson (5)	United Center; 22,879	36–19
56	February 27	@ Minnesota	L 98–102	David Robinson (29)	David Robinson (9)	Terry Porter (7)	Target Center; 19,654	36–20
57	February 29	Miami	W 93–69	David Robinson (19)	Samaki Walker (11)	Avery Johnson (5)	Alamodome; 18,629	37–20

March: 10–5 (home: 6–3; road: 4–2)

Game	Date	Team	Score	High points	High rebounds	High assists	Location Attendance	Record
58	March 2	Minnesota	L 102–108	David Robinson (24)	Samaki Walker (12)	Terry Porter (10)	Alamodome; 16,320	37–21
59	March 4	Sacramento	L 103–108 (OT)	David Robinson (23)	Tim Duncan (15)	Avery Johnson (8)	Alamodome; 35,113	37–22
60	March 6	New Jersey	W 106–104	David Robinson (25)	David Robinson, Tim Duncan (13)	Avery Johnson (11)	Alamodome; 17,581	38–22
61	March 9	@ Atlanta	W 105–79	Avery Johnson, Antonio Daniels (18)	David Robinson (9)	Antonio Daniels (6)	Philips Arena; 12,674	39–22
62	March 10	@ Washington	W 106–99 (OT)	Tim Duncan (23)	David Robinson (11)	Avery Johnson, Mario Elie (5)	MCI Center; 16,409	40–22
63	March 12	@ New York	L 80–93	David Robinson (22)	Tim Duncan (13)	Avery Johnson (4)	Madison Square Garden; 19,763	40–23
64	March 14	Atlanta	W 94–79	David Robinson (26)	Tim Duncan (13)	Avery Johnson (10)	Alamodome; 26,708	41–23
65	March 16	Dallas	L 88–110	David Robinson (20)	Malik Rose, Mario Elie (7)	Mario Elie, Samaki Walker, Antonio Daniels, Avery Johnson (3)	Alamodome; 23,592	41–24
66	March 18	Denver	W 102–82	Samaki Walker (18)	David Robinson (12)	Avery Johnson (8)	Alamodome; 24,460	42–24
67	March 21	@ Dallas	L 96–97	David Robinson (30)	David Robinson (17)	Tim Duncan (5)	Reunion Arena; 15,578	42–25
68	March 22	L. A. Clippers	W 103–78	Tim Duncan (30)	Samaki Walker (12)	Antonio Daniels (6)	Alamodome; 18,556	43–25
69	March 25	Cleveland	W 96–76	Tim Duncan (17)	Tim Duncan (17)	Tim Duncan (11)	Alamodome; 35,217	44–25
70	March 27	@ Seattle	W 90–82	Tim Duncan (30)	Tim Duncan (18)	David Robinson, Avery Johnson (5)	KeyArena; 14,738	45–25
71	March 28	@ Portland	W 89–85	Tim Duncan (36)	Tim Duncan (15)	Tim Duncan (6)	Rose Garden Arena; 20,584	46–25
72	March 30	Golden State	W 102–90	David Robinson (27)	Tim Duncan (17)	Jaren Jackson (5)	Alamodome; 18,793	47–25

April: 5–4 (home: 2–2; road: 3–2)

Game	Date	Team	Score	High points	High rebounds	High assists	Location Attendance	Record
73	April 2	@ Miami	L 84–88	David Robinson (28)	Tim Duncan (11)	Avery Johnson (6)	AmericanAirlines Arena; 19,600	47–26
74	April 4	@ Orlando	L 97–107	David Robinson (30)	Tim Duncan (9)	Avery Johnson, Antonio Daniels (6)	TD Waterhouse Centre; 15,267	47–27
75	April 5	Sacramento	L 98–108	Tim Duncan (28)	David Robinson (8)	Terry Porter (7)	Alamodome; 24,333	47–28
76	April 8	@ L. A. Lakers	W 98–80	Tim Duncan (26)	Tim Duncan (16)	Terry Porter (6)	STAPLES Center; 18,997	48–28
77	April 9	@ Vancouver	W 107–99	Tim Duncan (31)	Tim Duncan (11)	Avery Johnson (10)	General Motors Place; 14,206	49–28
78	April 11	@ Sacramento	W 98–92 (OT)	David Robinson (26)	David Robinson (14)	Avery Johnson (6)	ARCO Arena; 14,206	50–28
79	April 13	Portland	L 77–93	David Robinson (16)	Samaki Walker (10)	Avery Johnson (4)	Alamodome; 30,641	50–29
80	April 15	Portland	W 106–83	David Robinson (19)	David Robinson (12)	Avery Johnson (8)	Alamodome; 28,114	51–29
81	April 17	Vancouver	W 100–93	David Robinson (27)	David Robinson (10)	Avery Johnson (7)	Alamodome; 19,913	52–29
82	April 19	L. A. Lakers	W 103–98	David Robinson (17)	Malik Rose, Jerome Kersey (9)	Antonio Daniels (10)	Alamodome; 29,447	53–29

1999–00 season schedule

== Playoffs ==
2000 playoff game log
First Round: 1–3 (home: 1–1; road: 0–2)

Game	Date	Team	Score	High points	High rebounds	High assists	Location Attendance	Series
1	April 22	Phoenix	L 70–72	Sean Elliott (15)	Samaki Walker (16)	Elie, Johnson (4)	Alamodome; 21,916	0–1
2	April 25	Phoenix	W 85–70	David Robinson (25)	David Robinson (15)	Avery Johnson (6)	Alamodome; 20,617	1–1
3	April 29	@ Phoenix	L 94–101	David Robinson (37)	David Robinson (13)	Avery Johnson (6)	America West Arena; 19,023	1–2
4	May 2	@ Phoenix	L 78–89	David Robinson (21)	David Robinson (16)	Avery Johnson (5)	America West Arena; 19,023	1–3

2000 schedule

== Player statistics ==
=== Regular season ===
Player	POS	GP	GS	MP	REB	AST	STL	BLK	PTS	MPG	RPG	APG	SPG	BPG	PPG
Avery Johnson	PG	82	82	2,571	158	491	76	18	919	31.4	1.9	6.0	.9	.2	11.2
Jaren Jackson	SG	81	12	1,691	181	118	54	7	513	20.9	2.2	1.5	.7	.1	6.3
David Robinson	C	80	80	2,557	770	142	97	183	1,427	32.0	9.6	1.8	1.2	2.3	17.8
Mario Elie	SF	79	79	2,217	249	193	73	9	590	28.1	3.2	2.4	.9	.1	7.5
Tim Duncan	PF	74	74	2,875	918	234	66	165	1,716	38.9	12.4	3.2	.9	2.2	23.2
Malik Rose	PF	74	3	1,341	335	47	35	52	496	18.1	4.5	.6	.5	.7	6.7
Jerome Kersey	SF	72	18	1,310	225	69	67	47	321	18.2	3.1	1.0	.9	.7	4.5
Samaki Walker	PF	71	7	980	272	38	10	35	360	13.8	3.8	.5	.1	.5	5.1
Terry Porter	PG	68	8	1,613	191	221	50	9	641	23.7	2.8	3.3	.7	.1	9.4
Antonio Daniels	SG	68	1	1,195	86	177	55	5	420	17.6	1.3	2.6	.8	.1	6.2
Steve Kerr	PG	32	0	268	19	12	4	0	89	8.4	.6	.4	.1	.0	2.8
Chucky Brown^{†}	PF	30	27	602	77	41	8	10	190	20.1	2.6	1.4	.3	.3	6.3
Felton Spencer	C	26	0	149	39	3	6	8	50	5.7	1.5	.1	.2	.3	1.9
Sean Elliott	SF	19	19	391	47	28	12	2	114	20.6	2.5	1.5	.6	.1	6.0
Derrick Dial	SG	8	0	95	26	5	1	1	40	11.9	3.3	.6	.1	.1	5.0

- ^{†} Denotes player spent time with another team in the season. Stats reflect time with the Spurs only.

=== Playoffs ===
Player	POS	GP	GS	MP	REB	AST	STL	BLK	PTS	MPG	RPG	APG	SPG	BPG	PPG
David Robinson	C	4	4	155	55	10	7	12	94	38.8	13.8	2.5	1.8	3.0	23.5
Avery Johnson	PG	4	4	144	9	21	4	0	48	36.0	2.3	5.3	1.0	.0	12.0
Samaki Walker	PF	4	4	121	45	2	1	12	36	30.3	11.3	.5	.3	3.0	9.0
Sean Elliott	SF	4	4	119	22	5	0	2	40	29.8	5.5	1.3	.0	.5	10.0
Mario Elie	SF	4	4	115	17	7	5	0	30	28.8	4.3	1.8	1.3	.0	7.5
Terry Porter	PG	4	0	89	1	5	6	0	20	22.3	.3	1.3	1.5	.0	5.0
Malik Rose	PF	4	0	83	19	1	2	3	21	20.8	4.8	.3	.5	.8	5.3
Antonio Daniels	SG	4	0	82	10	6	7	0	29	20.5	2.5	1.5	1.8	.0	7.3
Jerome Kersey	SF	2	0	25	4	1	2	1	2	12.5	2.0	.5	1.0	.5	1.0
Jaren Jackson	SG	2	0	19	1	2	1	0	2	9.5	.5	1.0	.5	.0	1.0
Derrick Dial	SG	2	0	8	2	0	0	0	5	4.0	1.0	.0	.0	.0	2.5

== Awards and records ==
- During the preseason period, the Spurs won the 1999 McDonald's Championship from October 14–16, winning the championship game over Brazil's Vasco da Gama. The 1999 McDonald's Championship was the final McDonald's Championship ever played.
- Tim Duncan, All-NBA First Team
- David Robinson, All-NBA Third Team
- Tim Duncan, NBA All-Defensive First Team
