= 1999–2000 Dallas Mavericks season =

NBA professional basketball team season

- Head coach: Don Nelson
- General manager: Don Nelson
- Owners: Ross Perot Jr. (through January 4, 2000); Mark Cuban (after January 4, 2000)
- Arena: Reunion Arena

Results
- Record: 40–42 (.488)
- Place: Division: 4th (Midwest); Conference: 9th (Western)
- Playoff finish: Did not qualify
- Stats at Basketball Reference

Local media
- Television: KSTR-TV; Fox Sports Net Southwest
- Radio: KRLD

The 1999–2000 Dallas Mavericks season was the 20th season for the Dallas Mavericks in the National Basketball Association.

== Season summary ==
=== Off-season ===
This season is especially notable as Mark Cuban purchased the team from Ross Perot Jr. in January 2000; under Cuban's leadership, the Mavericks built a foundation for continued NBA success that eventually led to two NBA Finals appearances (and one championship) in the next decade. During the off-season, the team re-acquired former Mavericks center Sean Rooks from the Los Angeles Lakers.

=== Regular season ===
The Mavericks continued to struggle with a 9–23 start to the regular season, as Gary Trent only played just eleven games due to hamstring and groin injuries, and Hot Rod Williams was out for the entire season due to a back injury. However, after the slow start, the team won 11 of their next 15 games, and held a 20–28 record at the All-Star break. At mid-season, the Mavericks signed former All-Star, and controversial power forward Dennis Rodman; however, Rodman's behavior issues led to a very short tenure in Dallas, as he was released to free agency in early March after twelve games. The Mavericks posted a six-game losing streak between February and March, but later on won nine of their final ten games of the season, finishing in fourth place in the Midwest Division with a 40–42 record; however, the team missed the NBA playoffs for the tenth consecutive year.

Michael Finley averaged 22.6 points, 6.3 rebounds, 5.3 assists and 1.3 steals per game, while second-year star Dirk Nowitzki showed improvement, averaging 17.5 points and 6.5 rebounds per game, and also leading the Mavericks with 116 three-point field goals, and Cedric Ceballos provided the team with 16.6 points and 6.7 rebounds per game. In addition, Erick Strickland contributed 12.8 points and 1.5 steals per game, while Robert Pack provided with 8.9 points and 5.8 assists per game, but only played just 29 games due to a sprained ankle, Steve Nash contributed 8.6 points and 4.9 assists per game, but only played 56 games due to an ankle injury, Shawn Bradley averaged 8.4 points, 6.5 rebounds and 2.5 blocks per game, and Hubert Davis contributed 7.4 points per game off the bench, while shooting .491 in three-point field-goal percentage.

During the NBA All-Star weekend at The Arena in Oakland in Oakland, California, Finley was selected for the 2000 NBA All-Star Game, as a member of the Western Conference All-Star team; it was his first ever All-Star appearance. Meanwhile, Nowitzki was selected for the NBA Rookie Challenge Game, as a member of the Sophomores team; Nowitzki scored 17 points despite the Sophomores losing to the Rookies team in overtime, 92–83. In addition, Nowitzki and Davis both participated in the NBA Three-Point Shootout; it was the third time Davis participated in the competition. Finley also finished tied in 13th place in Most Valuable Player voting, while Nowitzki finished in second place in Most Improved Player voting, behind Jalen Rose of the Indiana Pacers, and Ceballos finished tied in third place in Sixth Man of the Year voting.

The Mavericks finished 23rd in the NBA in home-game attendance, with an attendance of 606,177 at the Reunion Arena during the regular season.

=== Aftermath ===
Following the season, Ceballos was traded to the Detroit Pistons, while Strickland was traded to the New York Knicks on draft day, Rooks was dealt to the Los Angeles Clippers, Pack and Williams were both dealt to the Boston Celtics in a four-team trade, who then sent Pack back to his former team, the Denver Nuggets, and released Williams to free agency as he retired.

== Draft picks ==
Round	Pick	Player	Position	Nationality	College
2	36	Wang Zhizhi	Center	China	
2	40	Gordan Giriček	Guard	Croatia	

== Roster ==
1999–2000 Dallas Mavericks roster
Players

Pos.	No.	Player	Height	Weight	DOB	From
C	44	Shawn Bradley	7 ft 6 in (2.29 m)	235 lb (107 kg)	1972–03–22	BYU
G	21	Greg Buckner	6 ft 4 in (1.93 m)	210 lb (95 kg)	1976–09–16	Clemson
G/F	23	Cedric Ceballos	6 ft 7 in (2.01 m)	220 lb (100 kg)	1969–08–02	Cal State Fullerton
G	24	Hubert Davis	6 ft 5 in (1.96 m)	183 lb (83 kg)	1970–05–17	North Carolina
F	4	Michael Finley	6 ft 7 in (2.01 m)	215 lb (98 kg)	1973–03–06	Wisconsin
G	11	Damon Jones	6 ft 3 in (1.91 m)	185 lb (84 kg)	1976–08–25	Houston
G	13	Steve Nash	6 ft 3 in (1.91 m)	195 lb (88 kg)	1974–02–07	Santa Clara
F/C	41	Dirk Nowitzki	7 ft 0 in (2.13 m)	237 lb (108 kg)	1978–06–19	Germany
G	14	Robert Pack	6 ft 2 in (1.88 m)	180 lb (82 kg)	1969–02–03	USC
G	2	Rodrick Rhodes (injured)	6 ft 6 in (1.98 m)	225 lb (102 kg)	1973–09–24	USC
C	45	Sean Rooks	6 ft 10 in (2.08 m)	250 lb (113 kg)	1969–09–09	Arizona
G	20	Erick Strickland	6 ft 3 in (1.91 m)	210 lb (95 kg)	1973–11–25	Nebraska
C	40	Bruno Šundov (injured)	7 ft 2 in (2.18 m)	220 lb (100 kg)	1980–02–10	The Winchendon School HS (MA)
F	33	Gary Trent (injured)	6 ft 8 in (2.03 m)	250 lb (113 kg)	1974–09–22	Ohio
F/C	18	Hot Rod Williams (injured) (IN)	6 ft 11 in (2.11 m)	215 lb (98 kg)	1962–08–09	Tulane

Coaches
Head coach
- Don Nelson
Assistant(s)
- Gar Heard
- Sidney Moncrief
- Donnie Nelson
- Charlie Parker
- Scott Roth
- Kiki Vandeweghe
- Brad Davis (player development)

Legend
- (DP) Unsigned draft pick
- (FA) Free agent
- (S) Suspended
- (IN) Inactive
- Injured

Roster

=== Roster notes ===
- Center Shawn Bradley holds both American and German citizenship.
- Power forward Dennis Rodman was waived on March 8, 2000.
- Forward/center Hot Rod Williams was on the injured reserve list due to a back strain, and missed the entire regular season.

== Regular season ==
=== Standings ===
Midwest Division	W	L	PCT	GB	Home	Road	Div
y-Utah Jazz	55	27	.671	–	31–10	24–17	14–10
x-San Antonio Spurs	53	29	.646	2	31–10	22–19	16–8
x-Minnesota Timberwolves	50	32	.610	5	26–15	24–17	18–6
Dallas Mavericks	40	42	.488	15	22–19	18–23	12–12
Denver Nuggets	35	47	.427	20	25–16	10–31	10–14
Houston Rockets	34	48	.415	21	22–19	12–29	8–16
Vancouver Grizzlies	22	60	.268	33	12–29	10–31	6–18

#	Western Conference				
#	Team	W	L	PCT	GB
1	z-Los Angeles Lakers	67	15	.817	–
2	y-Utah Jazz	55	27	.671	12
3	x-Portland Trail Blazers	59	23	.720	8
4	x-San Antonio Spurs	53	29	.646	14
5	x-Phoenix Suns	53	29	.646	14
6	x-Minnesota Timberwolves	50	32	.610	17
7	x-Seattle SuperSonics	45	37	.549	22
8	x-Sacramento Kings	44	38	.537	23
9	Dallas Mavericks	40	42	.488	27
10	Denver Nuggets	35	47	.427	32
11	Houston Rockets	34	48	.415	33
12	Vancouver Grizzlies	22	60	.268	45
13	Golden State Warriors	19	63	.232	48
14	Los Angeles Clippers	15	67	.183	52

z= clinched division title y= clinched division title x= clinched playoff spot

=== Game log ===
1999–2000 game log
Total: 40–42 (Home: 22–19; Road: 18–23)
November: 5–11 (home: 4–2; road: 1–9)

Game	Date	Team	Score	High points	High rebounds	High assists	Location Attendance	Record
1	November 2	Golden State	W 108–96	Cedric Ceballos (27)	Finley, Nowitzki (7)	Erick Strickland (5)	Reunion Arena; 12,848	1–0
2	November 4	@ Seattle	L 96–106	Cedric Ceballos (34)	Shawn Bradley (8)	Robert Pack (11)	KeyArena; 16,140	1–1
3	November 6	@ Golden State	W 120–97	Michael Finley (23)	Cedric Ceballos (13)	Robert Pack (8)	The Arena in Oakland; 12,708	2–1
4	November 7	@ L.A. Lakers	L 97–105	Michael Finley (29)	Dirk Nowitzki (9)	Steve Nash (7)	Staples Center; 18,068	2–2
5	November 9	L.A. Lakers	L 101–123	Finley, Strickland (19)	Rooks Ceballos (7)	Erick Strickland (4)	Reunion Arena; 17,349	2–3
6	November 11	@ Miami	L 105–128	Dirk Nowitzki (23)	Dirk Nowitzki (9)	three players tied (5)	Miami Arena; 14,683	2–4
7	November 13	Orlando	W 125–117	Michael Finley (28)	Cedric Ceballos (12)	Robert Pack (10)	Reunion Arena; 12,558	3–4
8	November 16	Houston	W 114–95	Michael Finley (28)	Michael Finley (13)	Robert Pack (10)	Reunion Arena; 14,371	4–4
9	November 17	@ Charlotte	L 99–104	Robert Pack (27)	Cedric Ceballos (14)	Robert Pack (14)	Charlotte Coliseum; 15,137	4–5
10	November 19	Sacramento	L 94–103	Michael Finley (24)	Michael Finley (12)	Michael Finley (8)	Reunion Arena; 15,507	4–6
11	November 20	@ San Antonio	L 90–106	Michael Finley (19)	Dirk Nowitzki (12)	Hubert Davis (7)	Alamodome; 16,596	4–7
12	November 23	@ Houston	L 99–119	Dirk Nowitzki (31)	Michael Finley (8)	Finley, Davis (6)	Compaq Center; 15,088	4–8
13	November 24	@ Orlando	L 100–112	Michael Finley (35)	Strickland, Nowitzki (9)	Erick Strickland (11)	Orlando Arena; 12,741	4–9
14	November 27	Chicago	W 95–83	Michael Finley (24)	Cedric Ceballos (7)	Nash, Strickland (7)	Reunion Arena; 14,436	5–9
15	November 29	@ New York	L 82–107	Michael Finley (20)	Michael Finley (8)	Dirk Nowitzki (6)	Madison Square Garden; 19,763	5–10
16	November 30	@ Cleveland	L 99–106	Hubert Davis (27)	Michael Finley (12)	Michael Finley (11)	Gund Arena; 11,033	5–11

December: 4–10 (home: 1–6; road: 3–4)

Game	Date	Team	Score	High points	High rebounds	High assists	Location Attendance	Record
17	December 2	@ Chicago	W 101–95	Michael Finley (30)	Michael Finley (9)	Hubert Davis (6)	United Center; 22,109	6–11
18	December 4	@ Minnesota	W 103–84	Michael Finley (32)	Cedric Ceballos (12)	Michael Finley (5)	Target Center; 16,671	7–11
19	December 5	@ Milwaukee	L 97–103	Michael Finley (29)	Dirk Nowitzki (10)	Dirk Nowitzki (6)	Bradley Center; 12,214	7–12
20	December 7	Vancouver	L 95–104	Dirk Nowitzki (31)	Cedric Ceballos (12)	Robert Pack (12)	Reunion Arena; 11,552	7–13
21	December 8	@ Utah	L 79–85	Cedric Ceballos (19)	Michael Finley (10)	Michael Finley (8)	Delta Center; 18,090	7–14
22	December 11	Phoenix	W 120–115	Michael Finley (33)	Michael Finley (14)	Robert Pack (11)	Reunion Arena; 14,444	8–14
23	December 14	San Antonio	L 93–111	Cedric Ceballos (27)	Cedric Ceballos (10)	Robert Pack (8)	Reunion Arena; 13,685	8–15
24	December 16	New York	L 93–100	Dirk Nowitzki (24)	Shawn Bradley (10)	Finley, Pack (7)	Reunion Arena; 13,796	8–16
25	December 18	Minnesota	L 104–108	Michael Finley (26)	Finley, Bradley (10)	Michael Finley (7)	Reunion Arena; 13,702	8–17
26	December 20	Miami	L 89–92	Gary Trent (22)	Shawn Bradley (10)	Finley, Trent (4)	Reunion Arena; 14,049	8–18
27	December 23	@ Phoenix	W 111–110	Michael Finley (33)	Michael Finley (13)	Michael Finley (13)	America West Arena; 19,023	9–18
28	December 26	@ Sacramento	L 111–118	Michael Finley (23)	Michael Finley (8)	Michael Finley (8)	ARCO Arena; 17,317	9–19
29	December 27	@ L.A. Lakers	L 106–108	Dirk Nowitzki (30)	Gary Trent (13)	Michael Finley (8)	Staples Center; 18,997	9–20
30	December 30	Toronto	L 104–109	Dirk Nowitzki (32)	Michael Finley (7)	Damon Jones (9)	Reunion Arena; 16,490	9–21

January: 8–5 (home: 5–2; road: 3–3)

Game	Date	Team	Score	High points	High rebounds	High assists	Location Attendance	Record
31	January 4	@ Denver	L 96–98	Michael Finley (28)	Michael Finley (8)	Michael Finley (10)	Pepsi Center; 10,549	9–22
32	January 6	Utah	L 92–105	Michael Finley (30)	Cedric Ceballos (14)	Michael Finley (8)	Reunion Arena; 12,218	9–23
33	January 8	Atlanta	W 95–85	Michael Finley (28)	Cedric Ceballos (14)	Michael Finley (9)	Reunion Arena; 12,814	10–23
34	January 10	@ Portland	L 94–107	Dirk Nowitzki (19)	Cedric Ceballos (11)	Michael Finley (5)	Rose Garden Arena; 19,980	10–24
35	January 11	@ Golden State	W 109–102	Michael Finley (21)	Cedric Ceballos (12)	Michael Finley (10)	The Arena in Oakland; 9,887	11–24
36	January 15	Portland	W 113–105	Michael Finley (32)	Cedric Ceballos (11)	Michael Finley (8)	Reunion Arena; 18,148	12–24
37	January 17	Houston	L 111–121	Cedric Ceballos (39)	Cedric Ceballos (9)	Erick Strickland (7)	Reunion Arena; 15,080	12–25
38	January 19	@ Washington	W 104–86	Michael Finley (23)	Dirk Nowitzki (9)	Michael Finley (9)	MCI Center; 11,358	13–25
39	January 22	@ New Jersey	L 95–98	Cedric Ceballos (36)	Shawn Bradley (11)	Michael Finley (9)	Continental Airlines Arena; 13,682	13–26
40	January 23	@ Detroit	W 99–91	Cedric Ceballos (22)	Finley, Ceballos (10)	Finley, Strickland (6)	The Palace of Auburn Hills; 13,047	14–26
41	January 25	Golden State	W 117–103	Michael Finley (30)	Shawn Bradley (12)	Michael Finley (10)	Reunion Arena; 13,164	15–26
42	January 27	L.A. Clippers	W 99–90	Dirk Nowitzki (24)	Shawn Bradley (10)	Michael Finley (10)	Reunion Arena; 11,927	16–26
43	January 29	Denver	W 107–96	Cedric Ceballos (31)	Cedric Ceballos (10)	Erick Strickland (6)	Reunion Arena; 16,674	17–26

February: 7–6 (home: 3–4; road: 4–2)

Game	Date	Team	Score	High points	High rebounds	High assists	Location Attendance	Record
44	February 1	Philadelphia	L 100–101	Cedric Ceballos (26)	Cedric Ceballos (12)	Steve Nash (8)	Reunion Arena; 13,506	17–27
45	February 3	Charlotte	W 106–96	Michael Finley (32)	Michael Finley (9)	Steve Nash (6)	Reunion Arena; 11,126	18–27
46	February 5	@ L.A. Clippers	W 119–106	Erick Strickland (24)	Michael Finley (10)	Michael Finley (9)	Staples Center; 13,646	19–27
47	February 6	@ Vancouver	W 103–99 (OT)	Michael Finley (34)	Erick Strickland (9)	Steve Nash (7)	General Motors Place; 14,861	20–27
48	February 9	Seattle	L 106–117	Finley, Ceballos (26)	Dennis Rodman (13)	Finley, Strickland (5)	Reunion Arena; 18,203	20–28
All-Star Break
49	February 15	Milwaukee	L 99–112	Shawn Bradley (20)	Dennis Rodman (16)	Michael Finley (6)	Reunion Arena; 11,912	20–29
50	February 17	Detroit	W 106–97	Dirk Nowitzki (22)	Dirk Nowitzki (12)	Erick Strickland (7)	Reunion Arena; 16,241	21–29
51	February 20	@ Toronto	W 100–96	Finley, Ceballos (23)	Dennis Rodman (16)	Steve Nash (4)	Air Canada Centre; 19,800	22–29
52	February 21	@ Indiana	L 93–94	Dirk Nowitzki (23)	Dennis Rodman (18)	Finley, Nowitzki (5)	Conseco Fieldhouse; 18,345	22–30
53	February 24	Utah	L 85–92	Cedric Ceballos (26)	Dennis Rodman (12)	Michael Finley (6)	Reunion Arena; 18,187	22–31
54	February 26	Denver	W 98–96	Pack, Ceballos (22)	Dennis Rodman (14)	Robert Pack (12)	Reunion Arena; 18,187	23–31
55	February 28	@ Boston	W 108–100	Dirk Nowitzki (26)	Dennis Rodman (16)	Pack, Nash (8)	FleetCenter; 16,981	24–31
56	February 29	@ Philadelphia	L 87–106	Michael Finley (15)	Sean Rooks (11)	Robert Pack (4)	First Union Center; 17,586	24–32

March: 7–9 (home: 3–5; road: 4–4)

Game	Date	Team	Score	High points	High rebounds	High assists	Location Attendance	Record
57	March 2	New Jersey	L 102–103	Erick Strickland (31)	Dennis Rodman (21)	Robert Pack (9)	Reunion Arena; 13,757	24–33
58	March 4	@ Phoenix	L 96–110	Cedric Ceballos (33)	Dennis Rodman (19)	Robert Pack (9)	America West Arena; 19,023	24–34
59	March 6	@ Sacramento	L 109–130	Cedric Ceballos (27)	Dennis Rodman (8)	Michael Finley (5)	ARCO Arena; 17,317	24–35
60	March 7	@ Seattle	L 86–101	Michael Finley (31)	Dennis Rodman (15)	three players tied (5)	KeyArena; 13,621	24–36
61	March 9	Minnesota	L 79–100	Shawn Bradley (26)	Shawn Bradley (9)	Michael Finley (5)	Reunion Arena; 13,435	24–37
62	March 11	Phoenix	W 104–99	Erick Strickland (36)	Shawn Bradley (12)	Robert Pack (8)	Reunion Arena; 18,187	25–37
63	March 14	Indiana	W 111–90	Dirk Nowitzki (28)	Greg Buckner (11)	Michael Finley (11)	Reunion Arena; 15,761	26–37
64	March 16	@ San Antonio	W 110–88	Erick Strickland (26)	Sean Rooks (11)	Steve Nash (11)	Alamodome; 23,592	27–37
65	March 18	Boston	L 99–104	Michael Finley (28)	Dirk Nowitzki (11)	Strickland, Nash (6)	Reunion Arena; 17,102	27–38
66	March 19	@ Atlanta	W 89–85	Michael Finley (31)	Finley, Bradley (7)	Steve Nash (5)	Philips Arena; 10,377	28–38
67	March 21	San Antonio	W 97–96	Michael Finley (24)	Shawn Bradley (8)	Steve Nash (4)	Reunion Arena; 15,578	29–38
68	March 23	Cleveland	L 98–104	Michael Finley (29)	Michael Finley (10)	Steve Nash (6)	Reunion Arena; 13,043	29–39
69	March 25	Washington	L 86–93	Dirk Nowitzki (18)	Shawn Bradley (14)	Steve Nash (7)	Reunion Arena; 15,403	29–40
70	March 27	@ Utah	W 113–105	Michael Finley (31)	Dirk Nowitzki (17)	Steve Nash (11)	Delta Center; 19,911	30–40
71	March 28	@ L.A. Clippers	W 112–102	Finley, Nowitzki (20)	Michael Finley (12)	Michael Finley (10)	Staples Center; 10,157	31–40
72	March 30	@ Portland	L 85–96	Michael Finley (30)	Michael Finley (7)	Steve Nash (7)	Rose Garden Arena; 20,399	31–41

April: 9–1 (home: 6–0; road: 3–1)

Game	Date	Team	Score	High points	High rebounds	High assists	Location Attendance	Record
73	April 2	@ Vancouver	W 100–86	Dirk Nowitzki (22)	Shawn Bradley (10)	Steve Nash (10)	General Motors Place; 12,941	32–41
74	April 4	Sacramento	W 105–102	Michael Finley (38)	Shawn Bradley (7)	Steve Nash (10)	Reunion Arena; 14,029	33–41
75	April 6	@ Denver	W 116–115 (OT)	Dirk Nowitzki (32)	Dirk Nowitzki (9)	Steve Nash (10)	Pepsi Center; 14,673	34–41
76	April 8	L.A. Clippers	W 98–96	Finley, Strickland (19)	Michael Finley (8)	Finley, Nash (7)	Reunion Arena; 13,552	35–41
77	April 11	Portland	W 92–81	Michael Finley (24)	Dirk Nowitzki (14)	Steve Nash (6)	Reunion Arena; 14,005	36–41
78	April 13	@ Houston	L 102–111	Michael Finley (35)	Bradley, Buckner (9)	Michael Finley (9)	Compaq Center; 14,634	36–42
79	April 14	Seattle	W 117–103	Erick Strickland (21)	Dirk Nowitzki (10)	Steve Nash (8)	Reunion Arena; 18,014	37–42
80	April 16	Vancouver	W 114–106	Michael Finley (25)	Erick Strickland (11)	Steve Nash (9)	Reunion Arena; 13,947	38–42
81	April 18	L.A. Lakers	W 112–102	Michael Finley (25)	Erick Strickland (10)	Steve Nash (8)	Reunion Arena; 18,190	39–42
82	April 19	@ Minnesota	W 113–107	Steve Nash (22)	Steve Nash (8)	Steve Nash (10)	Target Center; 16,818	40–42

1999–00 schedule

== Mark Cuban ==
On January 15, 2000, Mark Cuban purchased a majority stake in the NBA Dallas Mavericks basketball team for $285 million from H. Ross Perot, Jr.

== Dennis Rodman ==
In the 1999–2000 NBA season, the then 38-year-old power forward was signed by the Dallas Mavericks, meaning that Rodman returned to the place where he grew up. For the Mavericks, he played 12 games, was ejected twice and alienated the franchise with his erratic behavior until he was waived again; Dallas guard Steve Nash commented that Rodman "never wanted to be [a Maverick]" and therefore was unmotivated.

== Player statistics ==
=== Regular season ===
Player	POS	GP	GS	MP	REB	AST	STL	BLK	PTS	MPG	RPG	APG	SPG	BPG	PPG
Michael Finley	SF	82	82	3,464	518	438	109	32	1,855	42.2	6.3	5.3	1.3	.4	22.6
Dirk Nowitzki	PF	82	81	2,938	532	203	63	68	1,435	35.8	6.5	2.5	.8	.8	17.5
Hubert Davis	PG	79	15	1,817	134	141	24	3	583	23.0	1.7	1.8	.3	.0	7.4
Shawn Bradley	C	77	54	1,901	497	60	71	190	647	24.7	6.5	.8	.9	2.5	8.4
Sean Rooks	C	71	13	1,001	248	68	29	52	309	14.1	3.5	1.0	.4	.7	4.4
Cedric Ceballos	SF	69	25	2,064	462	90	56	24	1,147	29.9	6.7	1.3	.8	.3	16.6
Erick Strickland	SG	68	67	2,025	323	211	105	13	867	29.8	4.8	3.1	1.5	.2	12.8
Steve Nash	PG	56	27	1,532	121	272	37	3	481	27.4	2.2	4.9	.7	.1	8.6
Greg Buckner	SG	48	1	923	174	55	38	20	275	19.2	3.6	1.1	.8	.4	5.7
Damon Jones^{†}	PG	42	0	416	39	57	12	1	165	9.9	.9	1.4	.3	.0	3.9
Robert Pack	PG	29	22	665	42	168	31	3	259	22.9	1.4	5.8	1.1	.1	8.9
Rick Hughes	PF	21	0	224	49	9	3	1	82	10.7	2.3	.4	.1	.0	3.9
Bruno Šundov	C	14	0	61	12	2	2	2	26	4.4	.9	.1	.1	.1	1.9
Dennis Rodman	PF	12	12	389	171	14	2	1	34	32.4	14.3	1.2	.2	.1	2.8
Gary Trent	SF	11	11	301	52	22	8	3	151	27.4	4.7	2.0	.7	.3	13.7
Rodrick Rhodes	SF	1	0	8	1	0	2	0	0	8.0	1.0	.0	2.0	.0	.0
Randell Jackson	PF	1	0	1	0	0	0	0	0	1.0	.0	.0	.0	.0	.0

- ^{†} Denotes player spent time with another team in the season. Stats reflect time with the Mavericks only.

== Award winners ==
- Michael Finley, NBA All-Star Game
