= 1999–2000 Phoenix Suns season =

Professional basketball season

- Head coach: Danny Ainge (resigned), Scott Skiles
- General manager: Bryan Colangelo
- Owners: Jerry Colangelo
- Arena: America West Arena

Results
- Record: 53–29 (.646)
- Place: Division: 3rd (Pacific); Conference: 4th (Western)
- Playoff finish: Conference Semifinals (lost to Lakers 1–4)
- Stats at Basketball Reference

Local media
- Television: KUTP; Fox Sports Net Arizona; Cox 9
- Radio: KTAR

The 1999–2000 Phoenix Suns season was the 32nd season for the Phoenix Suns in the National Basketball Association.

== Season summary ==
=== Off-season ===
The Suns acquired the ninth overall pick in the 1999 NBA draft from the Dallas Mavericks via trade, and selected small forward Shawn Marion from the University of Nevada, Las Vegas. During the off-season, the team acquired All-Star guard Penny Hardaway from the Orlando Magic, signed free agents Rodney Rogers, Todd Day, and former Suns center Oliver Miller, who played for the team when they reached the 1993 NBA Finals.

=== Regular season ===
With the addition of Hardaway, Rogers, Marion and Miller, the Suns won 11 of their first 15 games of the regular season, which included a seven-game winning streak between November and December. After a 13–7 start to the season, Danny Ainge resigned as the team's head coach to spend more time with his family, and was replaced with assistant coach Scott Skiles. Under Skiles, the Suns continued to play above .500 in winning percentage, holding a 29–19 record at the All-Star break. The Suns posted an eight-game winning streak in February, and finished in third place in the Pacific Division with a 53–29 record, earning the fifth seed in the Western Conference; the team qualified for the NBA playoffs for the twelfth consecutive year.

Six players on the team averaged double-digits in points this season; Clifford Robinson led the Suns in scoring with 18.5 points per game and 120 three-point field goals, while Hardaway averaged 16.9 points, 5.8 rebounds, 5.3 assists and 1.6 steals per game in only 60 games due to a foot injury, and Jason Kidd provided the team with 14.3 points, 7.2 rebounds, 10.1 assists and 2.0 steals per game. In addition, Rogers played a sixth man role off the bench, averaging 13.8 points and 5.5 rebounds per game along with 115 three-point field goals, finished fourth in the league with .439 in three-point field goal percentage, and was named the NBA Sixth Man of the Year. Meanwhile, Tom Gugliotta contributed 13.7 points, 7.9 rebounds and 1.5 steals per game, but only played 54 games due to injury, Marion averaged 10.2 points and 6.5 rebounds per game in only 51 games, Day provided with 6.8 points per game in 58 games, and Rex Chapman contributed 6.6 points per game in 53 games. On the defensive side, Luc Longley averaged 6.3 points and 4.5 rebounds per game, and Miller provided with 6.3 points, 5.1 rebounds and 1.6 blocks per game in 51 games.

During the NBA All-Star weekend at The Arena in Oakland in Oakland, California, Kidd was selected for the 2000 NBA All-Star Game, as a member of the Western Conference All-Star team. Kidd scored 11 points along with 14 assists and 4 steals, as the Western Conference defeated the Eastern Conference, 137–126. In addition, Kidd also participated in the NBA 2Ball Competition, along with Jennifer Gillom of the WNBA's Phoenix Mercury. Kidd was also named to the All-NBA First Team, as he and Robinson were both selected to the NBA All-Defensive Second Team, while Marion and was named to the NBA All-Rookie Second Team. Kidd finished in eleventh place in Most Valuable Player voting, and also finished tied in eighth place along with Robinson in Defensive Player of the Year voting; Rogers finished tied in eighth place in Most Improved Player voting, and Skiles finished tied in fifth place in Coach of the Year voting.

In March, Kidd suffered an ankle injury and missed the final month of the regular season; Gugliotta and Chapman were also both out due to season-ending injuries, and did not participate in the NBA playoffs. Former All-Star and Suns guard Kevin Johnson came out of his retirement to fill in the void in Kidd's absence; he had retired after the 1997–98 season. Johnson played in six regular season games, averaging 6.7 points and 4.0 assists per game.

The Suns finished sixth in the NBA in home-game attendance, with an attendance of 773,115 at the America West Arena during the regular season.

=== NBA playoffs ===
In the Western Conference First Round of the 2000 NBA playoffs, the Suns faced off against the 4th–seeded, and defending NBA champion San Antonio Spurs. Despite both teams finishing with the same regular-season record, the Spurs had home-court advantage in the series. However, the Spurs were without All-Star forward Tim Duncan, who was out due to a season-ending left knee injury, as the team was led by All-Star center David Robinson, Avery Johnson and Mario Elie. The Suns won Game 1 over the Spurs on the road, 72–70 at the Alamodome, but then lost Game 2 on the road, 85–70. With the series tied at 1–1, the Suns won the next two games at home, as Kidd returned from his ankle injury to play in Game 4, in which the Suns defeated the Spurs at the America West Arena, 89–78 to win the series in four games, and advance to the Western Conference Semi-finals for the first time since the 1994–95 season.

In the Semi-finals, the Suns faced off against the top–seeded, and Pacific Division champion Los Angeles Lakers, who were led by the trio of All-Star center, and Most Valuable Player of the Year, Shaquille O'Neal, All-Star guard Kobe Bryant, and Glen Rice. Hardaway and O'Neal were both former teammates on the Orlando Magic. The Suns lost the first three games to the Lakers, but managed to win Game 4 at the America West Arena, 117–98. However, the Suns lost Game 5 to the Lakers on the road, 87–65 at the Staples Center, thus losing the series in five games.

The Lakers would advance to the 2000 NBA Finals to defeat the Indiana Pacers in six games.

=== Notable incidents ===
On December 17, 1999, after a 110–102 win over the Portland Trail Blazers at the Rose Garden Arena in Portland, Oregon, Gugliotta had a near-death experience where he suffered from a seizure on the team bus, while talking to his wife, Nikki, on his cellular phone. Gugliotta had stopped breathing while being rushed to Legacy Emanuel Hospital, where he was listed in serious condition, and underwent a series of tests, which did not reveal the cause of his seizure; he was released from the hospital the next day, but experienced headaches afterwards. Gugliotta had taken the supplement, "furanone di-hydro", after the Suns' game against the Trail Blazers, and before boarding the team bus, because he had trouble sleeping, and had taken the supplement once before without any effects.

=== Aftermath ===
Following the season, Johnson retired for the second and last time, while Chapman also retired due to continuing injuries, Miller was released to free agency, and Longley was traded to the New York Knicks.

== Offseason ==
=== NBA draft ===
| Round | Pick | Player | Position | Nationality | College |
|---|---|---|---|---|---|
| 1 | 9 | Shawn Marion | Forward | United States | UNLV |

The Suns received the ninth pick from a trade with the Dallas Mavericks in 1998. With the pick they selected combo forward Shawn Marion from UNLV. Marion averaged 18.7 points, 9.3 rebounds, 2.5 steals and 1.9 blocks per game in one year with the Runnin' Rebels. On July 30, the Suns signed him to a 4-year rookie contract for $5.9 million. Though missing two months with a knee injury, Marion averaged 10.2 points and 6.5 rebounds per game in his first season, and was named to the NBA All-Rookie Second Team. Marion would play over eight seasons with the Suns, becoming an All-Star four times and being named to the All-NBA Third Team twice, before being traded to the Miami Heat in 2008. Marion would eventually have his number that he wore throughout his time with the team retired in the Phoenix Suns Ring of Honor on December 15, 2023.

The Suns traded their first-round pick to the Chicago Bulls in 1999. With the pick the Bulls selected future All-Star and Defensive Player of the Year Ron Artest (later Metta World Peace). They also traded their second-round pick to the Houston Rockets in 1996. With the pick the Rockets selected Tyrone Washington.

== Roster ==
1999–2000 Phoenix Suns roster
Players

| Pos. | No. | Player | Height | Weight | DOB | From |
|---|---|---|---|---|---|---|
| G/F | 12 | Toby Bailey | 6 ft 6 in (1.98 m) | 213 lb (97 kg) | 1975–11–19 | UCLA |
| F/C | 40 | Corie Blount | 6 ft 9 in (2.06 m) | 240 lb (109 kg) | 1969–01–04 | Cincinnati |
| G | 3 | Rex Chapman (injured) | 6 ft 4 in (1.93 m) | 185 lb (84 kg) | 1967–10–05 | Kentucky |
| G/F | 11 | Todd Day | 6 ft 6 in (1.98 m) | 188 lb (85 kg) | 1970–01–07 | Arkansas |
| F/C | 24 | Tom Gugliotta (injured) | 6 ft 10 in (2.08 m) | 240 lb (109 kg) | 1969–12–19 | NC State |
| G | 1 | Penny Hardaway | 6 ft 7 in (2.01 m) | 195 lb (88 kg) | 1971–07–18 | Memphis |
| G | 7 | Kevin Johnson | 6 ft 1 in (1.85 m) | 180 lb (82 kg) | 1966–03–04 | California |
| G | 32 | Jason Kidd | 6 ft 4 in (1.93 m) | 205 lb (93 kg) | 1973–03–23 | California |
| G | 2 | Randy Livingston | 6 ft 4 in (1.93 m) | 209 lb (95 kg) | 1975–04–02 | LSU |
| C | 13 | Luc Longley | 7 ft 2 in (2.18 m) | 265 lb (120 kg) | 1969–01–19 | New Mexico |
| F | 25 | Don MacLean | 6 ft 10 in (2.08 m) | 235 lb (107 kg) | 1970–01–16 | UCLA |
| F | 31 | Shawn Marion | 6 ft 7 in (2.01 m) | 220 lb (100 kg) | 1978–05–07 | UNLV |
| C | 8 | Oliver Miller | 6 ft 9 in (2.06 m) | 280 lb (127 kg) | 1970–04–06 | Arkansas |
| F | 30 | Clifford Robinson | 6 ft 10 in (2.08 m) | 225 lb (102 kg) | 1966–12–16 | Connecticut |
| F | 54 | Rodney Rogers | 6 ft 7 in (2.01 m) | 235 lb (107 kg) | 1971–06–20 | Wake Forest |

Coaches
Head coach
- Scott Skiles
Assistant(s)
- Frank Johnson
- John MacLeod
- Phil Weber

Legend
- (DP) Unsigned draft pick
- (FA) Free agent
- (S) Suspended
- Injured

== Regular season ==
=== Standings ===
| Pacific Division | W | L | PCT | GB | Home | Road | Div |
|---|---|---|---|---|---|---|---|
| y-Los Angeles Lakers | 67 | 15 | .817 | – | 36–5 | 31–10 | 20–4 |
| x-Portland Trail Blazers | 59 | 23 | .720 | 8 | 30–11 | 29–12 | 21–3 |
| x-Phoenix Suns | 53 | 29 | .646 | 14 | 32–9 | 21–20 | 15–9 |
| x-Seattle SuperSonics | 45 | 37 | .549 | 22 | 24–17 | 21–20 | 12–12 |
| x-Sacramento Kings | 44 | 38 | .537 | 23 | 30–11 | 14–27 | 9–15 |
| Golden State Warriors | 19 | 63 | .232 | 48 | 12–29 | 7–34 | 2–22 |
| Los Angeles Clippers | 15 | 67 | .183 | 52 | 10–31 | 5–36 | 5–19 |

| # | Western Conference | | | | |
| # | Team | W | L | PCT | GB |
|---|---|---|---|---|---|
| 1 | z-Los Angeles Lakers | 67 | 15 | .817 | – |
| 2 | y-Utah Jazz | 55 | 27 | .671 | 12 |
| 3 | x-Portland Trail Blazers | 59 | 23 | .720 | 8 |
| 4 | x-San Antonio Spurs | 53 | 29 | .646 | 14 |
| 5 | x-Phoenix Suns | 53 | 29 | .646 | 14 |
| 6 | x-Minnesota Timberwolves | 50 | 32 | .610 | 17 |
| 7 | x-Seattle SuperSonics | 45 | 37 | .549 | 22 |
| 8 | x-Sacramento Kings | 44 | 38 | .537 | 23 |
| 9 | Dallas Mavericks | 40 | 42 | .488 | 27 |
| 10 | Denver Nuggets | 35 | 47 | .427 | 32 |
| 11 | Houston Rockets | 34 | 48 | .415 | 33 |
| 12 | Vancouver Grizzlies | 22 | 60 | .268 | 45 |
| 13 | Golden State Warriors | 19 | 63 | .232 | 48 |
| 14 | Los Angeles Clippers | 15 | 67 | .183 | 52 |

== Game log ==
=== Regular season ===
1999-2000 Regular Season Game Log (53–29) (home: 32–9; road: 21–20)
November (10–4) (home: 7–1; road: 3–3)

| Game | Date | Team | Score | High points | High rebounds | High assists | Location Attendance | Record | Report |
|---|---|---|---|---|---|---|---|---|---|
| 1 | November 2 | @ Denver | L 102–107 (OT) | Tom Gugliotta (22) | Tom Gugliotta (19) | Jason Kidd (8) | Pepsi Center; 19,099 | 0–1 | |
| 2 | November 4 | Philadelphia | W 84–80 | Jason Kidd (22) | Tom Gugliotta (10) | Tied (3) | America West Arena; 19,023 | 1–1 | |
| 3 | November 7 | San Antonio | W 77–74 | Jason Kidd (23) | Penny Hardaway (10) | Jason Kidd (7) | America West Arena; 19,023 | 2–1 | |
| 4 | November 9 | @ Chicago | W 103–80 | Tied (19) | Tom Gugliotta (12) | Jason Kidd (9) | United Center; 22,026 | 3–1 | |
| 5 | November 10 | @ New Jersey | W 104–89 | Penny Hardaway (25) | Oliver Miller (10) | Penny Hardaway (5) | Continental Airlines Arena; 11,652 | 4–1 | |
| 6 | November 12 | @ Milwaukee | L 92–107 | Penny Hardaway (19) | Tom Gugliotta (10) | Tied (4) | Bradley Center; 16,137 | 4–2 | |
| 7 | November 13 | @ Minnesota | L 100–111 | Penny Hardaway (21) | Oliver Miller (8) | Jason Kidd (7) | Target Center; 20,003 | 4–3 | |
| 8 | November 15 | L.A. Lakers | L 82–91 | Jason Kidd (20) | Luc Longley (10) | Jason Kidd (10) | America West Arena; 19,023 | 4–4 | |
| 9 | November 17 | Chicago | W 105–81 | Tied (18) | Tom Gugliotta (7) | Jason Kidd (11) | America West Arena; 18,480 | 5–4 | |
| 10 | November 19 | New York | W 96–81 | Todd Day (20) | Tom Gugliotta (9) | Jason Kidd (10) | America West Arena; 19,023 | 6–4 | |
| 11 | November 21 | Seattle | W 99–86 | Jason Kidd (25) | Clifford Robinson (8) | Jason Kidd (14) | America West Arena; 18,663 | 7–4 | |
| 12 | November 23 | Toronto | W 94–93 | Penny Hardaway (17) | Tied (7) | Jason Kidd (15) | America West Arena; 18,718 | 8–4 | |
| 13 | November 27 | New Jersey | W 129–90 | Shawn Marion (27) | Tied (8) | Tied (7) | America West Arena; 19,023 | 9–4 | |
| 14 | November 30 | @ L.A. Clippers | W 94–80 | Jason Kidd (20) | Tom Gugliotta (11) | Jason Kidd (10) | Staples Center; 10,233 | 10–4 | |

December (8–7) (home: 7–2; road: 1–5)

| Game | Date | Team | Score | High points | High rebounds | High assists | Location Attendance | Record | Report |
|---|---|---|---|---|---|---|---|---|---|
| 15 | December 1 | Houston | W 128–122 (2OT) | Clifford Robinson (25) | Tied (8) | Jason Kidd (11) | America West Arena; 18,630 | 11–4 | |
| 16 | December 4 | @ Houston | L 95–105 | Tied (21) | Penny Hardaway (9) | Tied (5) | Compaq Center; 16,285 | 11–5 | |
| 17 | December 5 | Portland | L 90–92 | Tied (19) | Luc Longley (9) | Jason Kidd (11) | America West Arena; 19,023 | 11–6 | |
| 18 | December 7 | Orlando | W 110–107 | Jason Kidd (29) | Oliver Miller (8) | Jason Kidd (10) | America West Arena; 18,249 | 12–6 | |
| 19 | December 9 | Washington | W 99–85 | Clifford Robinson (31) | Tom Gugliotta (8) | Jason Kidd (9) | America West Arena; 18,053 | 13–6 | |
| 20 | December 11 | @ Dallas | L 115–120 | Clifford Robinson (28) | Jason Kidd (13) | Jason Kidd (9) | Reunion Arena; 14,444 | 13–7 | |
| 21 | December 14 | Detroit | W 114–104 | Rex Chapman (22) | Jason Kidd (9) | Jason Kidd (11) | America West Arena; 18,575 | 14–7 | |
| 22 | December 17 | @ Portland | W 110–102 | Jason Kidd (32) | Tom Gugliotta (14) | Jason Kidd (10) | Rose Garden Arena; 20,584 | 15–7 | |
| 23 | December 18 | Sacramento | W 119–103 | Clifford Robinson (33) | Jason Kidd (14) | Jason Kidd (14) | America West Arena; 19,023 | 16–7 | |
| 24 | December 20 | Milwaukee | W 108–101 | Rodney Rogers (24) | Rodney Rogers (13) | Jason Kidd (11) | America West Arena; 18,656 | 17–7 | |
| 25 | December 21 | @ San Antonio | L 90–91 (OT) | Clifford Robinson (26) | Oliver Miller (12) | Jason Kidd (10) | Alamodome; 23,480 | 17–8 | |
| 26 | December 23 | Dallas | L 111–110 | Clifford Robinson (30) | Clifford Robinson (9) | Jason Kidd (15) | America West Arena; 19,023 | 17–9 | |
| 27 | December 26 | Golden State | W 108–88 | Clifford Robinson (25) | Clifford Robinson (8) | Jason Kidd (7) | America West Arena; 19,023 | 18–9 | |
| 28 | December 27 | @ Utah | L 91–92 | Rex Chapman (29) | Jason Kidd (12) | Jason Kidd (15) | Delta Center; 19,911 | 18–10 | |
| 29 | December 29 | @ L.A. Lakers | L 103–87 | Clifford Robinson (24) | Clifford Robinson (8) | Jason Kidd (11) | Staples Center; 19,911 | 18–11 | |

January (7–7) (home: 3–2; road: 4–5)

| Game | Date | Team | Score | High points | High rebounds | High assists | Location Attendance | Record | Report |
|---|---|---|---|---|---|---|---|---|---|
| 30 | January 4 | Charlotte | W 86–80 | Clifford Robinson (30) | Tom Gugliotta (10) | Jason Kidd (10) | America West Arena; 18,640 | 19–11 | |
| 31 | January 7 | San Antonio | L 83–102 | Clifford Robinson (22) | Luc Longley (10) | Jason Kidd (13) | America West Arena; 19,023 | 19–12 | |
| 32 | January 8 | @ Portland | L 91–96 | Rex Chapman (20) | Tom Gugliotta (9) | Jason Kidd (14) | Rose Garden Arena; 20,584 | 19–13 | |
| 33 | January 11 | @ Seattle | L 88–101 | Clifford Robinson (17) | Tom Gugliotta (9) | Jason Kidd (15) | KeyArena; 13,912 | 19–14 | |
| 34 | January 12 | @ Vancouver | W 95–92 | Jason Kidd (20) | Jason Kidd (10) | Jason Kidd (10) | General Motors Place; 14,404 | 20–14 | |
| 35 | January 14 | Portland | L 105–83 | Clifford Robinson (23) | Rodney Rogers (10) | Jason Kidd (8) | America West Arena; 19,023 | 20–15 | |
| 36 | January 16 | Denver | W 113–100 | Clifford Robinson (50) | Tied (8) | Jason Kidd (13) | America West Arena; 19,023 | 21–15 | |
| 37 | January 21 | @ Denver | W 101–99 | Tied (24) | Tom Gugliotta (15) | Jason Kidd (12) | Pepsi Center; 18,221 | 22–15 | |
| 38 | January 22 | Cleveland | W 101–88 | Tied (16) | Tom Gugliotta (9) | Jason Kidd (12) | America West Arena; 19,023 | 23–15 | |
| 39 | January 25 | @ Indiana | L 87–93 | Clifford Robinson (24) | Tom Gugliotta (10) | Jason Kidd (8) | Conseco Fieldhouse; 18,345 | 23–16 | |
| 40 | January 26 | @ Philadelphia | W 93–87 | Penny Hardaway (27) | Jason Kidd (13) | Jason Kidd (8) | First Union Center; 19,450 | 24–16 | |
| 41 | January 28 | @ Boston | L 88–91 | Clifford Robinson (37) | Jason Kidd (12) | Jason Kidd (14) | Fleet Center; 18,624 | 24–17 | |
| 42 | January 29 | @ Charlotte | L 100–79 | Penny Hardaway (24) | Tom Gugliotta (11) | Jason Kidd (6) | Charlotte Coliseum; 19,366 | 24–18 | |
| 43 | January 31 | @ Orlando | W 117–113 | Clifford Robinson (28) | Tied (8) | Jason Kidd (14) | Orlando Arena; 13,677 | 25–18 | |

February (10–3) (home: 6–0; road: 4–3)

| Game | Date | Team | Score | High points | High rebounds | High assists | Location Attendance | Record | Report |
|---|---|---|---|---|---|---|---|---|---|
| 44 | February 2 | L.A. Clippers | W 114–68 | Clifford Robinson (21) | Luc Longley (9) | Jason Kidd (8) | America West Arena; 18,421 | 26–18 | |
| 45 | February 4 | @ Seattle | L 86–94 | Rodney Rogers (26) | Jason Kidd (12) | Jason Kidd (6) | KeyArena; 15,739 | 26–19 | |
| 46 | February 6 | Seattle | W 105–93 | Tied (22) | Tom Gugliotta (9) | Jason Kidd (12) | America West Arena; 19,023 | 27–19 | |
| 47 | February 8 | Vancouver | W 94–76 | Luc Longley (20) | Penny Hardaway (8) | Jason Kidd (9) | America West Arena; 18,385 | 28–19 | |
| 48 | February 10 | Minnesota | W 101–85 | Tied (16) | Luc Longley (12) | Jason Kidd (7) | America West Arena; 19,023 | 29–19 | |
| 49 | February 15 | @ Sacramento | W 117–108 | Rodney Rogers (36) | Jason Kidd (10) | Jason Kidd (11) | ARCO Arena; 17,317 | 30–19 | |
| 50 | February 18 | Atlanta | W 85–73 | Rodney Rogers (24) | Tied (9) | Jason Kidd (9) | America West Arena; 19,023 | 31–19 | |
| 51 | February 21 | @ San Antonio | W 98–89 | Rodney Rogers (22) | Tom Gugliotta (11) | Jason Kidd (11) | Alamodome; 17,049 | 32–19 | |
| 52 | February 22 | Denver | W 86–67 | Rodney Rogers (17) | Penny Hardaway (10) | Jason Kidd (7) | America West Arena; 19,023 | 33–19 | |
| 53 | February 24 | @ Washington | W 92–83 | Tom Gugliotta (20) | Tom Gugliotta (8) | Jason Kidd (9) | MCI Center; 15,191 | 34–19 | |
| 54 | February 25 | @ New York | L 79–84 | Tom Gugliotta (16) | Jason Kidd (10) | Jason Kidd (13) | Madison Square Garden; 19,763 | 34–20 | |
| 55 | February 27 | @ Toronto | L 102–103 | Tied (28) | Tom Gugliotta (7) | Penny Hardaway (5) | Air Canada Centre; 19,800 | 34–21 | |
| 56 | February 29 | @ Cleveland | W 100–93 | Penny Hardaway (22) | Jason Kidd (9) | Tied (6) | Gund Arena; 13,044 | 35–21 | |

March (12–4) (home: 7–1; road: 5–3)

| Game | Date | Team | Score | High points | High rebounds | High assists | Location Attendance | Record | Report |
|---|---|---|---|---|---|---|---|---|---|
| 57 | March 2 | Indiana | W 118–87 | Clifford Robinson (22) | Jason Kidd (9) | Jason Kidd (15) | America West Arena; 19,023 | 36–21 | |
| 58 | March 4 | Dallas | W 110–96 | Rodney Rogers (29) | Tom Gugliotta (14) | Jason Kidd (14) | America West Arena; 19,023 | 37–21 | |
| 59 | March 6 | Miami | W 100–92 | Penny Hardaway (28) | Jason Kidd (9) | Jason Kidd (17) | America West Arena; 19,023 | 38–21 | |
| 60 | March 7 | @ Houston | W 108–101 | Penny Hardaway (24) | Jason Kidd (12) | Penny Hardaway (10) | Compaq Center; 14,749 | 39–21 | |
| 61 | March 10 | Utah | L 96–99 | Penny Hardaway (28) | Luc Longley (7) | Penny Hardaway (12) | America West Arena; 19,023 | 39–22 | |
| 62 | March 11 | @ Dallas | L 99–104 | Clifford Robinson (29) | Rodney Rogers (11) | Jason Kidd (9) | Reunion Arena; 18,187 | 39–23 | |
| 63 | March 14 | Minnesota | W 107–100 | Penny Hardaway (26) | Shawn Marion (12) | Jason Kidd (12) | America West Arena; 19,023 | 40–23 | |
| 64 | March 17 | @ Vancouver | W 101–86 | Clifford Robinson (27) | Shawn Marion (11) | Jason Kidd (15) | General Motors Place; 14,255 | 41–23 | |
| 65 | March 19 | @ Golden State | W 99–82 | Clifford Robinson (25) | Shawn Marion (13) | Jason Kidd (14) | The Arena in Oakland; 12,837 | 42–23 | |
| 66 | March 19 | Boston | W 110–106 | Clifford Robinson (22) | Tied (9) | Jason Kidd (11) | America West Arena; 19,023 | 43–23 | |
| 67 | March 22 | Sacramento | W 114–93 | Clifford Robinson (26) | Shawn Marion (9) | Jason Kidd (7) | America West Arena; 19,023 | 44–23 | |
| 68 | March 24 | @ L.A. Lakers | L 101–109 | Penny Hardaway (25) | Shawn Marion (14) | Penny Hardaway (7) | Staples Center; 18,997 | 44–24 | |
| 69 | March 26 | Golden State | W 90–82 | Penny Hardaway (33) | Shawn Marion (14) | Randy Livingston (7) | America West Arena; 19,023 | 45–24 | |
| 70 | March 28 | @ Miami | L 78–81 | Rodney Rogers (22) | Penny Hardaway (9) | Penny Hardaway (5) | American Airlines Arena; 15,923 | 45–25 | |
| 71 | March 30 | @ Atlanta | W 118–74 | Rodney Rogers (21) | Rodney Rogers (8) | Penny Hardaway (11) | Philips Arena; 11,870 | 46–25 | |
| 72 | March 31 | @ Detroit | W 98–97 | Clifford Robinson (20) | Tied (8) | Penny Hardaway (12) | The Palace of Auburn Hills; 22,076 | 47–25 | |

April (6–4) (home: 2–3; road: 4–1)

| Game | Date | Team | Score | High points | High rebounds | High assists | Location Attendance | Record | Report |
|---|---|---|---|---|---|---|---|---|---|
| 73 | April 2 | @ Minnesota | W 87–86 | Rodney Rogers (23) | Shawn Marion (9) | Penny Hardaway (9) | Target Center; 19,006 | 48–25 | |
| 74 | April 4 | L.A. Lakers | L 83–84 | Penny Hardaway (23) | Penny Hardaway (10) | Tied (6) | America West Arena; 19,023 | 48–26 | |
| 75 | April 6 | @ Utah | L 85–105 | Penny Hardaway (13) | Penny Hardaway (8) | Kevin Johnson (5) | Delta Center; 19,911 | 48–27 | |
| 76 | April 9 | @ Sacramento | W 102–97 | Penny Hardaway (25) | Penny Hardaway (12) | Kevin Johnson (9) | ARCO Arena; 17,317 | 49–27 | |
| 77 | April 11 | @ L.A. Clippers | W 95–88 | Clifford Robinson (22) | Shawn Marion (12) | Penny Hardaway (8) | Staples Center; 14,724 | 50–27 | |
| 78 | April 12 | Vancouver | W 122–116 (OT) | Clifford Robinson (36) | Clifford Robinson (10) | Randy Livingston (7) | America West Arena; 18,463 | 51–27 | |
| 79 | April 14 | L.A. Clippers | W 112–88 | Rodney Rogers (22) | Tied (11) | Penny Hardaway (8) | America West Arena; 18,538 | 52–27 | |
| 80 | April 16 | Utah | L 82–96 | Penny Hardaway (16) | Oliver Miller (8) | Randy Livingston (7) | America West Arena; 19,023 | 52–28 | |
| 81 | April 18 | Houston | L 98–107 | Tied (20) | Penny Hardaway (10) | Penny Hardaway (12) | America West Arena; 19,023 | 52–29 | |
| 82 | April 19 | @ Golden State | W 99–88 | Clifford Robinson (23) | Tied (8) | Tied (5) | The Arena in Oakland; 14,212 | 53–29 | |

=== Playoffs ===
2000 Playoff Game Log (4–5) (home: 3–1; road: 1–4)
First Round (3–1) (home: 2–0; road: 1–1)

| Game | Date | Team | Score | High points | High rebounds | High assists | Location Attendance | Record | Report |
|---|---|---|---|---|---|---|---|---|---|
| 1 | April 22 | @ San Antonio | W 72–70 | Tied (17) | Shawn Marion (9) | Kevin Johnson (basketball) (6) | Alamodome; 21,916 | 1–0 | |
| 2 | April 25 | @ San Antonio | L 70–85 | Penny Hardaway (19) | Corie Blount (11) | Tied (3) | Alamodome; 20,617 | 1–1 | |
| 3 | April 29 | San Antonio | W 101–94 | Penny Hardaway (17) | Shawn Marion (14) | Penny Hardaway (13) | America West Arena; 19,023 | 2–1 | |
| 4 | May 2 | San Antonio | W 89–78 | Tied (23) | Tied (10) | Jason Kidd (10) | America West Arena; 19,023 | 3–1 | |

Conference semifinals (1–4) (home: 1–1; road: 0–3)

| Game | Date | Team | Score | High points | High rebounds | High assists | Location Attendance | Record | Report |
|---|---|---|---|---|---|---|---|---|---|
| 1 | May 7 | @ L.A. Lakers | L 77–105 | Penny Hardaway (25) | Tied (7) | Jason Kidd (7) | Staples Center; 18,997 | 0–1 | |
| 2 | May 10 | @ L.A. Lakers | L 96–97 | Clifford Robinson (30) | Tied (9) | Penny Hardaway (8) | Staples Center; 18,997 | 0–2 | |
| 3 | May 12 | L.A. Lakers | L 99–105 | Penny Hardaway (31) | Clifford Robinson (9) | Jason Kidd (12) | America West Arena; 19,023 | 0–3 | |
| 4 | May 14 | L.A. Lakers | W 117–98 | Clifford Robinson (32) | Jason Kidd (10) | Jason Kidd (16) | America West Arena; 19,023 | 1–3 | |
| 5 | May 16 | @ L.A. Lakers | L 65–87 | Todd Day (10) | Rodney Rogers (8) | Clifford Robinson (4) | Staples Center; 18,997 | 1–4 | |

== Awards and honors ==
=== Week/Month ===
- Jason Kidd was named Player of the Week for games played December 12 through December 18.

=== All-Star ===
- Jason Kidd was voted as a starter for the Western Conference in the All-Star Game. Kidd finished first in voting among Western Conference guards with 1,061,031 votes.

=== Season ===
- Rodney Rogers received the Sixth Man of the Year Award. Rogers also finished eighth in Most Improved Player voting.
- Jason Kidd was named to the All-NBA First Team. Kidd also finished tenth in MVP voting.
- Jason Kidd was named to the NBA All-Defensive Second Team. Kidd also finished tenth in Defensive Player of the Year voting.
- Clifford Robinson was named to the NBA All-Defensive Second Team. Robinson also finished tenth in Defensive Player of the Year voting.
- Shawn Marion was named to the NBA All-Rookie Second Team.
- Jason Kidd led the league in assists per game with a 10.1 average.

== Player statistics ==
Legend
| GP | Games played | GS | Games started | MPG | Minutes per game |
| FG% | Field-goal percentage | 3P% | 3-point field-goal percentage | FT% | Free-throw percentage |
| RPG | Rebounds per game | APG | Assists per game | SPG | Steals per game |
| BPG | Blocks per game | PPG | Points per game |

=== Season ===
| Player | GP | GS | MPG | FG% | 3P% | FT% | RPG | APG | SPG | BPG | PPG |
|---|---|---|---|---|---|---|---|---|---|---|---|
| Toby Bailey | 46 | 2 | 9.8 | .414 | .200 | .692 | 1.6 | 0.7 | .3 | .1 | 3.5 |
| Corie Blount | 38 | 1 | 11.7 | .494† | .000 | .576 | 3.0 | 0.3 | .4 | .2 | 2.8 |
| Rex Chapman | 53 | 19 | 18.1 | .388 | .333 | .756 | 1.5 | 1.2 | .4 | .0 | 6.6 |
| Ben Davis | 5 | 0 | 4.4 | .333 | . | . | 1.8 | .4 | .2 | .2 | 0.8 |
| Todd Day | 58 | 1 | 16.2 | .394 | .388 | .667 | 2.2 | 1.1 | .8 | .4 | 6.8 |
| Tom Gugliotta | 54 | 54 | 32.7 | .481 | .125 | .775 | 7.9 | 2.3 | 1.5 | .6 | 13.7 |
| Penny Hardaway | 60 | 60 | 37.6 | .474 | .324 | .790 | 5.8 | 5.3 | 1.6 | .6 | 16.9 |
| Kevin Johnson | 6 | 0 | 18.8 | .571† | 1.000^ | 1.000# | 2.7 | 4.0 | .3 | .0 | 6.7 |
| Jason Kidd | 67 | 67 | 39.0 | .409 | .337 | .829# | 7.2 | 10.1 | 2.0 | .4 | 14.3 |
| Randy Livingston | 79 | 15 | 13.7 | .416 | .345 | .839# | 1.6 | 2.2 | .6 | .2 | 4.8 |
| Luc Longley | 72 | 68 | 19.7 | .466 | . | .825 | 4.5 | 1.1 | .3 | .6 | 6.3 |
| Don MacLean | 16 | 0 | 8.9 | .367 | .333 | .667 | 1.4 | 0.5 | .1 | .1 | 2.6 |
| Shawn Marion | 51 | 38 | 24.7 | .471 | .182 | .847# | 6.5 | 1.4 | .7 | 1.0 | 10.2 |
| Oliver Miller | 51 | 9 | 21.3 | .588† | . | .671 | 5.1 | 1.3 | .8 | 1.6 | 6.3 |
| Clifford Robinson | 80 | 67 | 35.5 | .464 | .370 | .782 | 4.5 | 2.8 | 1.1 | .8 | 18.5 |
| Rodney Rogers | 82 | 7 | 27.9 | .486† | .439^ | .639 | 5.5 | 2.1 | 1.1 | .6 | 13.8 |
| Mark West | 22 | 2 | 5.8 | .417 | . | .625 | 1.4 | 0.1 | .1 | .2 | 0.7 |

† – Minimum 300 field goals made.
^ – Minimum 55 three-pointers made.
# – Minimum 125 free throws made.

=== Playoffs ===
| Player | GP | GS | MPG | FG% | 3P% | FT% | RPG | APG | SPG | BPG | PPG |
|---|---|---|---|---|---|---|---|---|---|---|---|
| Toby Bailey | 5 | 0 | 3.0 | .250 | . | .500 | 0.4 | 0.4 | .0 | .0 | 0.8 |
| Corie Blount | 9 | 0 | 18.0 | .548† | . | .556 | 6.2 | 0.3 | .7 | .7 | 4.9 |
| Todd Day | 9 | 0 | 11.1 | .457 | .313 | .500 | 1.1 | 0.4 | .4 | .1 | 4.7 |
| Penny Hardaway | 9 | 9 | 42.9 | .462† | .263 | .710 | 4.9 | 5.7 | 1.6 | 1.0 | 20.3 |
| Kevin Johnson | 9 | 0 | 14.3 | .324 | .000 | .833^ | 1.4 | 2.6 | .3 | .1 | 3.2 |
| Jason Kidd | 6 | 6 | 38.2 | .400 | .364 | .778^ | 6.7 | 8.8 | 1.8 | .2 | 9.8 |
| Randy Livingston | 7 | 3 | 9.0 | .222 | .333 | . | 1.0 | 0.6 | .6 | .1 | 2.0 |
| Luc Longley | 9 | 9 | 18.0 | .353 | . | .667 | 3.3 | 0.9 | .4 | .4 | 4.2 |
| Shawn Marion | 9 | 9 | 31.2 | .419 | .167 | .818^ | 8.8 | 0.8 | .7 | 1.6 | 9.1 |
| Oliver Miller | 7 | 0 | 5.3 | .222 | .000 | .500 | 1.1 | 0.1 | .0 | .3 | 0.9 |
| Clifford Robinson | 9 | 9 | 37.0 | .386 | .325 | .733 | 6.0 | 2.1 | 1.2 | .8 | 17.6 |
| Rodney Rogers | 9 | 0 | 29.2 | .417 | .222 | .742^ | 6.8 | 1.6 | 1.1 | 1.1 | 14.1 |

† – Minimum 20 field goals made.
^ – Minimum 10 free throws made.

Player statistics citation:

== Transactions ==
=== Trades ===
| August 5, 1999 | To Orlando Magic (United States) Pat Garrity (United States) Danny Manning 2001 first-round draft pick ( (United States) Jason Collins) 2002 first-round draft pick ( (United States) Amar'e Stoudemire) | To Phoenix Suns (United States) Penny Hardaway |

=== Free agents ===
==== Additions ====
| Date | Player | Contract | Former Team |
|---|---|---|---|
| July 30, 1999 | Toby Bailey | Re-signed to 1-year contract for $535,000 | Phoenix Suns |
| August 1, 1999 | Clifford Robinson | Re-signed to 4-year contract for $29 million | Phoenix Suns |
| August 1, 1999 | Oliver Miller | Signed to 1-year contract for $510,000 | Sacramento Kings |
| August 2, 1999 | Rodney Rogers | Signed to 3-year contract for $6.6 million | Los Angeles Clippers |
| August 17, 1999 | Randy Livingston | Re-signed to multi-year contract | Phoenix Suns |
| September 8, 1999 | Corie Blount | Signed to 1-year contract for $1.1 million | Cleveland Cavaliers |
| October 4, 1999 | Todd Day | Signed to 1-year contract for $510,000 | La Crosse Bobcats (CBA) |
| October 5, 1999 | Jason Singleton | Undisclosed | |
| October 5, 1999 | Travis Thornton | Undisclosed | Fresno, Ca |
| October 5, 1999 | LaMarcus Golden | Undisclosed | Rapid City Thrillers (IBA) |
| October 5, 1999 | Mike Brown | Undisclosed | Cantabria Lobos |
| October 5, 1999 | Peter Aluma | Undisclosed | Sacramento Kings |
| October 19, 1999 | Mark West | Signed to 1-year contract for $510,000 | Atlanta Hawks |
| December 23, 1999 | Ben Davis | Undisclosed | Idaho Stampede (CBA) |
| January 7, 2000 | Ben Davis | Signed 10-day contract | Phoenix Suns |
| March 13, 2000 | Don MacLean | Signed two 10-day contracts | Seattle SuperSonics |
| March 23, 2000 | Kevin Johnson | Signed for rest of season | Phoenix Suns |
| April 2, 2000 | Don MacLean | Signed for rest of season | Phoenix Suns |

==== Subtractions ====
| Date | Player | Reason left | New team |
|---|---|---|---|
| October 12, 1999 | Kevin Johnson | Retired | Phoenix Suns |
| October 14, 1999 | Jason Singleton | Waived | Sydney Spirit (Australia) |
| October 14, 1999 | LaMarcus Golden | Waived | Siouxland Bombers (IBA) |
| October 16, 1999 | Peter Aluma | Waived | Harlem Globetrotters |
| October 19, 1999 | Mike Brown | Waived | Olympiacos (Greece) |
| December 21, 1999 | Gerald Brown | Waived | La Crosse Bobcats (CBA) |
| January 5, 2000 | Ben Davis | Waived | Phoenix Suns |
| January 11, 2000 | Ben Davis | Waived | Brujos de Guayama (Puerto Rico) |
| March 25, 2000 | Mark West | Waived | —N/a (Retired) |

Player Transactions Citation:
