= 1999–2000 NBA season =

54th NBA season

- League: National Basketball Association
- Sport: Basketball
- Duration: November 2, 1999 – April 19, 2000; April 22 – June 4, 2000 (Playoffs); June 7 – 19, 2000 (Finals)
- Teams: 29
- TV partner(s): NBC, TBS, TNT

Draft
- Top draft pick: Elton Brand
- Picked by: Chicago Bulls

Regular season
- Top seed: Los Angeles Lakers
- Season MVP: Shaquille O'Neal (L.A. Lakers)
- Top scorer: Shaquille O'Neal (L.A. Lakers)

Playoffs
- Eastern champions: Indiana Pacers
- Eastern runners-up: New York Knicks
- Western champions: Los Angeles Lakers
- Western runners-up: Portland Trail Blazers

Finals
- Champions: Los Angeles Lakers
- Runners-up: Indiana Pacers
- Finals MVP: Shaquille O'Neal (L.A. Lakers)

NBA seasons
- ← 1998–99 2000–01 →

The 1999–2000 NBA season was the 54th season of the National Basketball Association (NBA). The season began on November 2, 1999, and ended with the Los Angeles Lakers winning the NBA championship, beating the Indiana Pacers 4 games to 2 in the 2000 NBA Finals.

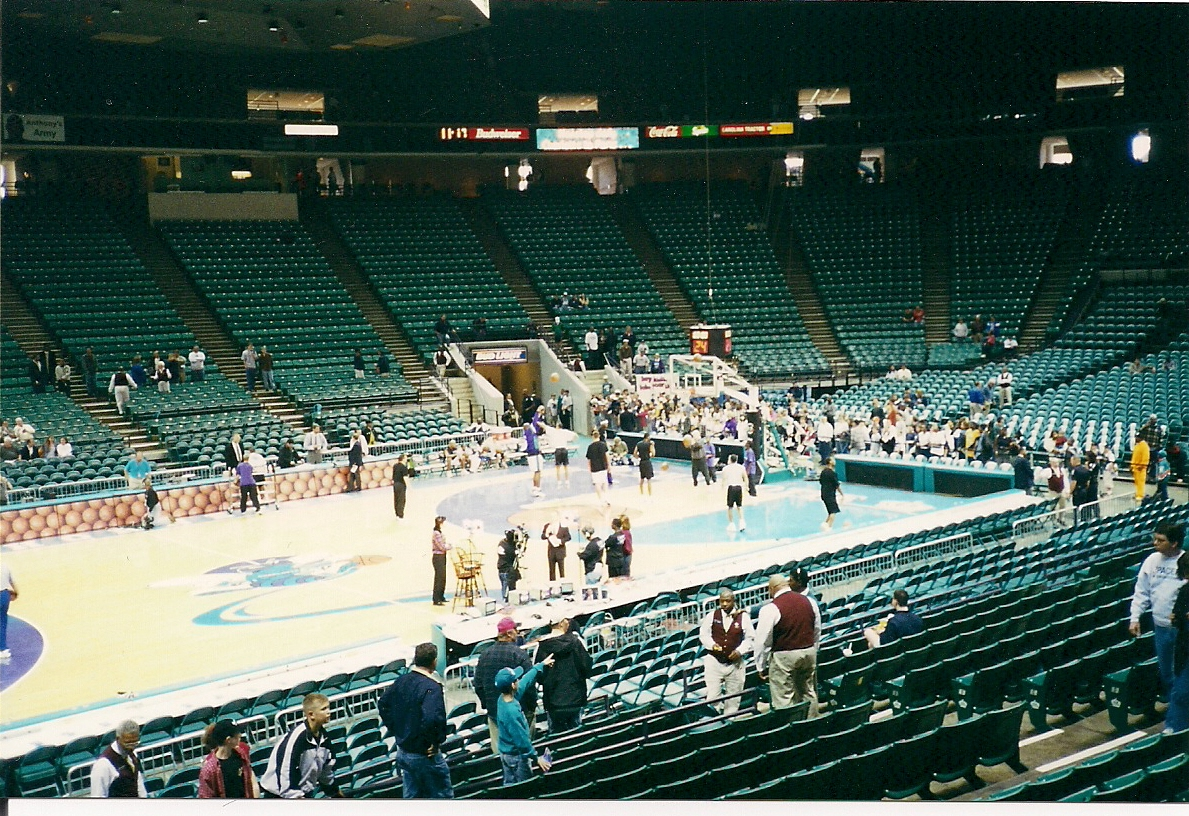
Players warming up prior to an April 2000 game between the Charlotte Hornets and the season's eventual Eastern Conference champions Indiana Pacers at the Charlotte Coliseum.

== Notable occurrences ==
Coaching changes
Offseason
Team	1998–99 coach	1999–2000 coach
Cleveland Cavaliers	Mike Fratello	Randy Wittman
Denver Nuggets	Mike D'Antoni	Dan Issel
Los Angeles Lakers	Kurt Rambis	Phil Jackson
Orlando Magic	Chuck Daly	Doc Rivers
Washington Wizards	Jim Brovelli	Gar Heard
In-season
Team	Outgoing coach	Incoming coach
Detroit Pistons	Alvin Gentry	George Irvine
Golden State Warriors	P.J. Carlesimo	Garry St. Jean
Los Angeles Clippers	Chris Ford	Jim Todd
Phoenix Suns	Danny Ainge	Scott Skiles
Vancouver Grizzlies	Brian Hill	Lionel Hollins
Washington Wizards	Gar Heard	Darrell Walker

- Effective this season, the first game of the NBA regular season begins on either the first Tuesday of November or the last Tuesday of October, and the last game on the third Wednesday of April. The NBA playoffs begin on the third Saturday of April.
- Hall of Famer Wilt Chamberlain died on October 12, 1999, at 63. Wilt's former teams, the Lakers, Sixers, and Warriors honored him by sporting black patches for the rest of the season.
- The Boston Celtics officially retired their trademark parquet floor on December 22, 1999, after 54 years. The floor would be replaced by a replica combining elements of the old floor and new wooden sections.
- Two active players were killed in automobile accidents within four months of each other.
  - On January 12, Bobby Phills of the Charlotte Hornets was killed as a result of reckless driving while racing against teammate David Wesley. Phills would have his jersey retired during the season after news of his unexpected death was announced.
  - On May 20, Malik Sealy of the Minnesota Timberwolves was driving home from a birthday party being held for Kevin Garnett when his SUV was struck by a drunk driver who had been driving on the wrong side of the road. Sealy would have his jersey retired on November 4, 2000.
- The Lakers would also go on to win 19 consecutive games between February 4, 2000, and March 16, 2000, the sixth-longest winning streak in NBA history.
- The 2000 NBA All-Star Game was held in Oakland, California. The West won 137–126. Tim Duncan from the San Antonio Spurs and Shaquille O'Neal from the Los Angeles Lakers shared the game's MVP honors. The Slam Dunk Contest returned after a two-year absence, with Vince Carter winning the title in what is considered to be the best Dunk Contest performance of all time.
- San Antonio Spurs forward Sean Elliott was sidelined for most of the season while undergoing kidney transplant operations. He successfully returned on March 13, becoming the first player to return following kidney transplant.
- Staples Center's first season saw its tenants at two opposite ends of the league: the Lakers finished with a best regular season record of 67–15 and the NBA title, while the Clippers finished 15–67, the worst of the season.
- The Toronto Raptors also made the playoffs for the first time, becoming the first Canadian team to do so.
- 36-year-old Houston Rockets forward Charles Barkley suffered a devastating injury early in the season but returned for a final game before retiring.
- The season marked Patrick Ewing's last in a New York Knicks uniform. He was traded during the 2000 offseason to the Seattle SuperSonics in a four-team deal.
- Doc Rivers became the first recipient of the NBA Coach of the Year Award to have not led his team to the playoffs. He coached the Orlando Magic to a respectable 41–41 (.500) record, good enough for the 9th seed in the East.
- During Game 7 of the Western Conference Finals, the Portland Trail Blazers held a 75–60 lead over the Los Angeles Lakers with 10:28 left to play. During the fourth quarter, the Blazers would miss thirteen consecutive shots, allowing the Lakers to claw back and take the game, 89–84. The game was capped off with a famous alley-oop to Shaquille O'Neal from Kobe Bryant.
- The Indiana Pacers advanced to the NBA Finals for the first time in franchise history.
- Kevin Johnson returned from retirement to replace the injured Jason Kidd of the Phoenix Suns in this season's playoffs, but the Suns fell to the Lakers in the second round and Johnson would retire again.

== 1999–2000 NBA changes ==
- The Atlanta Hawks moved into the Philips Arena (now State Farm Arena) and changed their uniforms added white (road), and red (home) side panels to their jerseys and shorts.
- The Boston Celtics added their alternate logo of a cloverleaf above the shorts of their uniforms.
- The Cleveland Cavaliers changed their uniforms, removing the blue areas from their jerseys.
- The Denver Nuggets moved into the Pepsi Center (now Ball Arena).
- The Detroit Pistons added new maroon alternate uniforms added black side panels to their jerseys and shorts.
- The Indiana Pacers moved into Conseco Fieldhouse, now Gainbridge Fieldhouse.
- The Los Angeles Clippers and Los Angeles Lakers both moved into the Staples Center, now Crypto.com Arena, while the Lakers changed their uniforms added gold (road), and purple (home) side panels to their jerseys and shorts.
- The Miami Heat changed their logo and uniforms added dark red (road), and also dark red (home) side panels to their jerseys and shorts, and moved into the AmericanAirlines Arena in January 2000 (now Kaseya Center).
- The Philadelphia 76ers added new blue alternate uniforms.
- The Seattle SuperSonics added new red alternate uniforms added dark green side panels to their jerseys and shorts.
- The Toronto Raptors changed their uniforms removing the pinstripes added side panels to their jerseys and shorts. They also played their first full season at Air Canada Centre (now Scotiabank Arena).

== Final standings ==
=== By division ===
Eastern Conference

Atlantic Division	W	L	PCT	GB	Home	Road	Div
y-Miami Heat	52	30	.634	–	33–8	19–22	18–6
x-New York Knicks	50	32	.610	2	33–8	17–24	14–10
x-Philadelphia 76ers	49	33	.598	3	29–12	20–21	13–11
Orlando Magic	41	41	.500	11	26–15	15–26	12–13
Boston Celtics	35	47	.427	17	26–15	9–32	12–12
New Jersey Nets	31	51	.378	21	22–19	9–32	9–16
Washington Wizards	29	53	.354	23	17–24	12–29	7–17

Central Division	W	L	PCT	GB	Home	Road	Div
y-Indiana Pacers	56	26	.683	–	36–5	20–21	20–8
x-Charlotte Hornets	49	33	.598	7	30–11	19–22	20–8
x-Toronto Raptors	45	37	.549	11	26–15	19–22	16–12
x-Detroit Pistons	42	40	.512	14	27–14	15–26	16–12
x-Milwaukee Bucks	42	40	.512	14	23–18	19–22	16–12
Cleveland Cavaliers	32	50	.390	24	22–19	10–31	8–20
Atlanta Hawks	28	54	.341	28	21–20	7–34	11–17
Chicago Bulls	17	65	.207	39	12–29	5–36	5–23

Western Conference

Midwest Division	W	L	PCT	GB	Home	Road	Div
y-Utah Jazz	55	27	.671	–	31–10	24–17	14–10
x-San Antonio Spurs	53	29	.646	2	31–10	22–19	16–8
x-Minnesota Timberwolves	50	32	.610	5	26–15	24–17	18–6
Dallas Mavericks	40	42	.488	15	22–19	18–23	12–12
Denver Nuggets	35	47	.427	20	25–16	10–31	10–14
Houston Rockets	34	48	.415	21	22–19	12–29	8–16
Vancouver Grizzlies	22	60	.268	33	12–29	10–31	6–18

Pacific Division	W	L	PCT	GB	Home	Road	Div
y-Los Angeles Lakers	67	15	.817	–	36–5	31–10	20–4
x-Portland Trail Blazers	59	23	.720	8	30–11	29–12	21–3
x-Phoenix Suns	53	29	.646	14	32–9	21–20	15–9
x-Seattle SuperSonics	45	37	.549	22	24–17	21–20	12–12
x-Sacramento Kings	44	38	.537	23	30–11	14–27	9–15
Golden State Warriors	19	63	.232	48	12–29	7–34	2–22
Los Angeles Clippers	15	67	.183	52	10–31	5–36	5–19

=== By conference ===
#	Eastern Conference				
#	Team	W	L	PCT	GB
1	c-Indiana Pacers	56	26	.683	–
2	y-Miami Heat	52	30	.634	4
3	x-New York Knicks	50	32	.610	6
4	x-Charlotte Hornets	49	33	.598	7
5	x-Philadelphia 76ers	49	33	.598	7
6	x-Toronto Raptors	45	37	.549	11
7	x-Detroit Pistons	42	40	.512	14
8	x-Milwaukee Bucks	42	40	.512	14
9	Orlando Magic	41	41	.500	15
10	Boston Celtics	35	47	.427	21
11	Cleveland Cavaliers	32	50	.390	24
12	New Jersey Nets	31	51	.378	25
13	Washington Wizards	29	53	.354	27
14	Atlanta Hawks	28	54	.341	28
15	Chicago Bulls	17	65	.207	39

#	Western Conference				
#	Team	W	L	PCT	GB
1	z-Los Angeles Lakers	67	15	.817	–
2	y-Utah Jazz	55	27	.671	12
3	x-Portland Trail Blazers	59	23	.720	8
4	x-San Antonio Spurs	53	29	.646	14
5	x-Phoenix Suns	53	29	.646	14
6	x-Minnesota Timberwolves	50	32	.610	17
7	x-Seattle SuperSonics	45	37	.549	22
8	x-Sacramento Kings	44	38	.537	23
9	Dallas Mavericks	40	42	.488	27
10	Denver Nuggets	35	47	.427	32
11	Houston Rockets	34	48	.415	33
12	Vancouver Grizzlies	22	60	.268	45
13	Golden State Warriors	19	63	.232	48
14	Los Angeles Clippers	15	67	.183	52

Notes

- z – Clinched home court advantage for the entire playoffs
- c – Clinched home court advantage for the conference playoffs
- y – Clinched division title
- x – Clinched playoff spot

== Playoffs ==
Teams in bold advanced to the next round. The numbers to the left of each team indicate the team's seeding in its conference, and the numbers to the right indicate the number of games the team won in that round. The division champions are marked by an asterisk. Home court advantage does not necessarily belong to the higher-seeded team, but instead the team with the better regular season record; teams enjoying the home advantage are shown in italics.

First Round	Conference Semifinals
**E1**	**Indiana***	**3**
E8	Milwaukee	2
**E1**	**Indiana***	**4**
E5	Philadelphia	2
E4	Charlotte	1
**E5**	**Philadelphia**	**3**
**Eastern Conference**
**E3**	**New York**	**3**
E6	Toronto	0
**E3**	**New York**	**4**
E2	Miami*	3
**E2**	**Miami***	**3**
E7	Detroit	0
**W1**	**LA Lakers***	**3**
W8	Sacramento	2
**W1**	**LA Lakers***	**4**
W5	Phoenix	1
W4	San Antonio	1
**W5**	**Phoenix**	**3**
**Western Conference**
**W3**	**Portland**	**3**
W6	Minnesota	1
**W3**	**Portland**	**4**
W2	Utah*	1
**W2**	**Utah***	**3**
W7	Seattle	2

Conference Finals
**E1**	**Indiana***	**4**
E3	New York	2
**W1**	**LA Lakers***	**4**
W3	Portland	3

NBA Finals
E1	Indiana*	2
**W1**	**LA Lakers***	**4**

- * Division winner
- **Bold** Series winner
- Italic Team with home-court advantage

== Statistics leaders ==
Category	Player	Team	Stat
Points per game	Shaquille O'Neal	Los Angeles Lakers	29.7
Rebounds per game	Dikembe Mutombo	Atlanta Hawks	14.1
Assists per game	Jason Kidd	Phoenix Suns	10.1
Steals per game	Eddie Jones	Charlotte Hornets	2.67
Blocks per game	Alonzo Mourning	Miami Heat	3.72
FG%	Shaquille O'Neal	Los Angeles Lakers	.574
FT%	Jeff Hornacek	Utah Jazz	.950
3FG%	Hubert Davis	Dallas Mavericks	.491

== NBA awards ==
- Most Valuable Player: Shaquille O'Neal, Los Angeles Lakers
- Co-Rookies of the Year: Elton Brand, Chicago Bulls; Steve Francis, Houston Rockets
- Defensive Player of the Year: Alonzo Mourning, Miami Heat
- Sixth Man of the Year: Rodney Rogers, Phoenix Suns
- Most Improved Player: Jalen Rose, Indiana Pacers
- Coach of the Year: Doc Rivers, Orlando Magic
- Executive of the Year: John Gabriel, Orlando Magic
- Sportsmanship Award: Eric Snow, Philadelphia 76ers

- All-NBA First Team:
  - F – Tim Duncan, San Antonio Spurs
  - F – Kevin Garnett, Minnesota Timberwolves
  - C – Shaquille O'Neal, Los Angeles Lakers
  - G – Gary Payton, Seattle SuperSonics
  - G – Jason Kidd, Phoenix Suns
- All-NBA Second Team:
  - F – Karl Malone, Utah Jazz
  - F – Grant Hill, Detroit Pistons
  - C – Alonzo Mourning, Miami Heat
  - G – Allen Iverson, Philadelphia 76ers
  - G – Kobe Bryant, Los Angeles Lakers
- All-NBA Third Team:
  - F – Chris Webber, Sacramento Kings
  - F – Vince Carter, Toronto Raptors
  - C – David Robinson, San Antonio Spurs
  - G – Eddie Jones, Charlotte Hornets
  - G – Stephon Marbury, New Jersey Nets

- NBA All-Defensive First Team:
  - Tim Duncan, San Antonio Spurs
  - Kevin Garnett, Minnesota Timberwolves
  - Alonzo Mourning, Miami Heat
  - Gary Payton, Seattle SuperSonics
  - Kobe Bryant, Los Angeles Lakers
- All-Defensive Second Team:
  - Scottie Pippen, Portland Trail Blazers
  - Clifford Robinson, Phoenix Suns
  - Shaquille O'Neal, Los Angeles Lakers
  - Eddie Jones, Charlotte Hornets
  - Jason Kidd, Phoenix Suns

- NBA All-Rookie First Team:
  - Elton Brand, Chicago Bulls
  - Steve Francis, Houston Rockets
  - Lamar Odom, Los Angeles Clippers
  - Wally Szczerbiak, Minnesota Timberwolves
  - Andre Miller, Cleveland Cavaliers
- All-Rookie Second Team:
  - Shawn Marion, Phoenix Suns
  - Ron Artest, (Note: Entered the NBA as Ron Artest before changing his name in 2011.) Chicago Bulls
  - James Posey, Denver Nuggets
  - Jason Terry, Atlanta Hawks
  - Chucky Atkins, Orlando Magic

=== Players of the month ===
The following players were named the Players of the Month.

Month	Player	Ref.
October – November	Shaquille O'Neal (Los Angeles Lakers)	
December	Alonzo Mourning (Miami Heat)	
January	Kevin Garnett (Minnesota Timberwolves)	
February	Shaquille O'Neal (Los Angeles Lakers)	
March	Shaquille O'Neal (Los Angeles Lakers)	
April	Gary Payton (Seattle SuperSonics)	

=== Rookies of the month ===
The following players were named the Rookies of the Month.

Month	Player	Ref.
October – November	Adrian Griffin (Boston Celtics); Lamar Odom (Los Angeles Clippers)	
December	Steve Francis (Houston Rockets)	
January	Elton Brand (Chicago Bulls)	
February	Elton Brand (Chicago Bulls)	
March	Steve Francis (Houston Rockets)	
April	Elton Brand (Chicago Bulls); Steve Francis (Houston Rockets)	

=== Coaches of the month ===
The following coaches were named Coaches of the Month.

Month	Coach	Ref.
October – November	Mike Dunleavy (Portland Trail Blazers)	
December	Phil Jackson (Los Angeles Lakers)	
January	Flip Saunders (Minnesota Timberwolves)	
February	Phil Jackson (Los Angeles Lakers)	
March	Jerry Sloan (Utah Jazz)	
April	Paul Silas (Charlotte Hornets)	

== See also ==
- List of NBA regular season records
