= Rodney Rogers =

American basketball player (1971–2025)

Personal information
- Born: June 20, 1971 Durham, North Carolina, U.S.
- Died: November 21, 2025 (aged 54) Durham, North Carolina, U.S.
- Listed height: 6 ft 7 in (2.01 m)
- Listed weight: 270 lb (122 kg)

Career information
- High school: Hillside (Durham, North Carolina)
- College: Wake Forest (1990–1993)
- NBA draft: 1993: 1st round, 9th overall pick
- Drafted by: Denver Nuggets
- Playing career: 1993–2005
- Position: Small forward / power forward
- Number: 54

Career history
- 1993–1995: Denver Nuggets
- 1995–1999: Los Angeles Clippers
- 1999–2002: Phoenix Suns
- 2002: Boston Celtics
- 2002–2004: New Jersey Nets
- 2004–2005: New Orleans Hornets
- 2005: Philadelphia 76ers

Career highlights
- NBA Sixth Man of the Year (2000); Consensus second-team All-American (1993); ACC Player of the Year (1993); 2× First-team All-ACC (1992, 1993); Second-team All-ACC (1991); ACC Rookie of the Year (1991); No. 54 retired by Wake Forest Demon Deacons; Third-team Parade All-American (1990); North Carolina Mr. Basketball (1990); McDonald's All-American (1990)

Career NBA statistics
- Points: 9,468 (10.9 ppg)
- Rebounds: 3,881 (4.5 rpg)
- Assists: 1,722 (2.0 apg)
- Stats at NBA.com
- Stats at Basketball Reference
Medals
Men's basketball
Representing United States
Summer Universiade
Gold medal – first place	1991 Sheffield	National team

Rodney Ray Rogers Jr. (June 20, 1971 – November 21, 2025) was an American professional basketball player who played for several teams in the National Basketball Association (NBA). He played college basketball for the Wake Forest Demon Deacons, earning consensus second-team All-American honors in 1993. Rogers was selected by the Denver Nuggets in the first round of the 1993 NBA draft with the ninth overall pick. In 2000, he was named the NBA Sixth Man of the Year as a member of the Phoenix Suns.

== Early life ==
Rogers was the fourth and youngest child born to Willie Wardsworth and Estella Rogers. He spent most of his childhood growing up in the McDougald Terrace housing project in Durham. His father, who left the family and moved to Texas when Rogers was a toddler, died when Rogers was eight.

Estella Rogers sustained severe head injuries and required two operations when she was nearly killed in an automobile wreck in 1988. She was in a coma for more than two weeks and remained hospitalized for three more months. Even after she returned home she still had memory loss and needed extra care. While his mother recovered, Rogers moved in with Nathaniel Brooks, who was once his youth league coach, spending his last two seasons at Hillside High School with the Brooks family.

His stepfather James Spencer, who was the only man Rogers called "Dad", died of lung cancer in February 1990. Renita, the oldest of the Rogers children, became a nurse at N.C. Memorial Hospital in Chapel Hill. His oldest brother Stacy, who attended the Eastern N.C. School for the Deaf in Wilson and the N.C. School for the Deaf in Morganton, won a gold medal in basketball at the 1981 XIV Deaflympics (aka "World Games for the Deaf" and "World Deaf Olympics") in Cologne, Germany. After that he worked for the Veterans Administration Hospital in Durham. Stanley, his other brother, served over 10 years (1981–1991) of a 20-year sentence for armed robbery at Central Prison in Raleigh.

== High school ==
Rogers attended Hillside High School in Durham. As an athlete, he was known as "the Durham Bull". He was a two-time Greensboro News & Record All-State selection, and was named the 1990 North Carolina state Player of the Year. As a junior, he averaged 22.5 points and 9.7 rebounds, and in his senior year he averaged 28.3 points and 12.3 rebounds on a team that finished 27-2 and advanced to the quarterfinals of the state 4-A playoffs. He was named McDonald's All-American and scored 17 points in the game.

== College career ==
From 1990 until 1993, Rogers played college basketball at Wake Forest University, where he won the 1990–1991 season Rookie of the Year honor (over Grant Hill) and was the Atlantic Coast Conference Player of the Year in 1993, averaging 21.2 points and 7.4 rebounds. His final college statistics were 19.3 points and 7.9 rebounds, and he was the number nine draft pick in the 1993 NBA draft for the Denver Nuggets.

Rogers's college jersey #54 was retired in February 1996 by the Demon Deacons.

== Professional career ==
Rogers was drafted with the 9th pick by the Denver Nuggets in the 1993 NBA draft and spent his rookie year coming off the bench for a team which was the first 8th-seeded team in NBA playoffs history to beat a first-seeded team, the Seattle SuperSonics. Rogers had one significant game in his rookie year, against the Utah Jazz on February 8, 1994. Near the end of the game, Rogers hit three 3-pointers in a span of nine seconds to bring the Nuggets from a 94–86 deficit to a 95–94 lead. However, Jeff Malone hit a jumper with 12 seconds remaining to give the Jazz the 96–95 win.

Rogers became a starter his second season, in large part due to frequent injuries suffered by LaPhonso Ellis. On March 10, 1995, Rogers grabbed a career-high 21 rebounds, scored 19 points, and recorded 8 assists during a 99–88 win over the Detroit Pistons. On June 28, Rogers was traded to the Los Angeles Clippers, with draft rights to guard Brent Barry, for the draft rights to forward Antonio McDyess and guard Randy Woods. He spent four years with the Clippers.

Rogers signed with the Phoenix Suns in 1999. He averaged 13.8 points per game coming off the bench and won the NBA Sixth Man of the Year Award in 2000. The Suns entered the playoffs that year, but lost to the eventual champion Los Angeles Lakers. Rogers remained with the Suns until February 2002, when he was traded to the Boston Celtics alongside Tony Delk for Milt Palacio, Randy Brown, Joe Johnson and a 2002 first-round draft pick.

Rogers signed with the New Jersey Nets as a free agent on August 14, 2002. During his first year with the Nets, he averaged 7 points per game coming off the bench. The high point of his season was during a playoff game against the Milwaukee Bucks on April 24, 2003. After missing two free throws, Rogers came back on the next possession to hit the game-winning shot. The Nets won that series and went on to make the NBA Finals, where they lost to the San Antonio Spurs. Rogers saw more playing time the next year, mainly due to some frontcourt injuries.

He signed with the New Orleans Hornets on August 3, 2004. He was injured for much of the early part of that season, but eventually became a team starter. On February 24, 2005, Rogers was traded to the Philadelphia 76ers, along with injured forward Jamal Mashburn, for also-injured forward Glenn Robinson. He was primarily used as a backup forward for the 76ers.

== Personal life and post-NBA career ==
Right after being drafted by the Denver Nuggets, in the summer of 1993, Rogers married Tisa White. They had three children together, two girls (Roddreka and Rydeiah) and one son (Rodney Rogers II). Roddreka, who was born December 1, 1993, underwent a 5 1/2-hour emergency neurological operation when she was just two months old. The couple later divorced.

In 2010, Rogers married Faye.

After Rogers was traded to the Phoenix Suns in 1999, the family made Paradise Valley, Arizona their home until 2006. Tisa returned to Durham to take over her father's family real estate business, in which Rogers was an investor. He returned to Durham in 2006 and went to work for the City of Durham as a heavy equipment operator. Rogers was promoted to supervisor in the spring of 2008. Most of his Public Works Department co-workers did not know he had been in the NBA and set for life financially until his dirt bike accident later that year.

Rogers was the cousin of former New England Patriots linebacker Tully Banta-Cain.

Rogers was a volunteer girls' basketball coach at Rogers-Herr Middle School, and he co-founded the Durham Eagles youth football team. He enjoyed hunting, riding motorcycles and ATVs, horseback riding and fishing. He was a NASCAR fan and loved big trucks and construction equipment.

Rogers was interviewed in his home for the 2025 HBO MAX documentary We Beat the Dream Team.

Rogers died on November 21, 2025, at the age of 54, of complications from his spinal cord injury.

=== 2008 ATV accident ===
On November 28, 2008, Rogers was involved in an all-terrain vehicle (ATV) crash in rural Vance County north of Raleigh. Rogers drove into a ditch while riding through a trail and flipped over his vehicle's handlebars. He was first flown to Duke University Medical Center, then on December 3 was moved by air ambulance to the Shepherd Center in Atlanta, Georgia, which specializes in spinal cord and brain injuries. Rogers was paralyzed from the shoulders down as a result of the accident.

== NBA career statistics ==
Legend
GP	Games played	GS	Games started	MPG	Minutes per game
FG%	Field goal percentage	3P%	3-point field goal percentage	FT%	Free throw percentage
RPG	Rebounds per game	APG	Assists per game	SPG	Steals per game
BPG	Blocks per game	PPG	Points per game	**Bold**	Career high

=== Regular season ===
Year	Team	GP	GS	MPG	FG%	3P%	FT%	RPG	APG	SPG	BPG	PPG
1993–94	Denver	79	14	17.8	.439	.380	.672	2.9	1.3	.8	.6	8.1
1994–95	Denver	80	**77**	26.8	**.488**	.388	.651	4.8	2.0	**1.2**	.6	12.2
1995–96	LA Clippers	67	51	29.1	.477	.320	.628	4.3	2.5	1.1	.5	11.6
1996–97	LA Clippers	81	62	30.6	.462	.361	.663	5.1	**2.7**	1.1	**.8**	13.2
1997–98	LA Clippers	76	70	**32.9**	.456	.340	.686	**5.6**	**2.7**	**1.2**	.5	**15.1**
1998–99	LA Clippers	47	7	20.6	.441	.286	.673	3.8	1.6	1.0	.5	7.4
1999–00	Phoenix	**82**	7	27.9	.486	**.439**	.639	5.5	2.1	1.1	.6	13.8
2000–01	Phoenix	**82**	3	26.6	.430	.296	.761	4.4	2.2	**1.2**	.6	12.2
2001–02	Phoenix	50	7	25.1	.466	.350	**.828**	4.8	1.4	1.0	.3	12.6
2001–02	Boston	27	1	23.2	.482	.411	.700	4.0	1.5	.6	.4	10.7
2002–03	New Jersey	68	0	19.2	.402	.333	.756	3.9	1.6	.7	.5	7.0
2003–04	New Jersey	69	15	20.4	.410	.329	.765	4.4	2.0	.9	.4	7.8
2004–05	New Orleans	30	26	29.4	.377	.272	.762	4.7	2.0	.6	.4	9.2
2004–05	Philadelphia	28	7	17.3	.391	.303	.714	3.7	.9	.8	.3	6.0
Career		866	347	25.3	.451	.347	.690	4.5	2.0	1.0	.5	10.9

=== Playoffs ===
Year	Team	GP	GS	MPG	FG%	3P%	FT%	RPG	APG	SPG	BPG	PPG
1994	Denver	12	0	15.8	.388	.316	.630	1.8	1.3	.6	.5	5.1
1995	Denver	3	**3**	25.3	**.545**	.250	.250	4.0	1.7	1.0	**1.3**	8.7
1997	LA Clippers	3	**3**	28.3	.414	.200	.750	2.3	2.0	**1.3**	1.0	10.7
2000	Phoenix	9	0	**29.2**	.417	.222	.742	**6.8**	1.6	1.1	1.1	**14.1**
2001	Phoenix	4	0	20.5	.300	.200	.643	3.5	.5	.5	.8	8.8
2002	Boston	16	0	24.6	.426	.365	**.886**	5.5	**2.1**	1.0	.4	8.9
2003	New Jersey	**20**	0	17.5	.372	**.405**	.711	2.8	1.4	.3	.2	6.7
2004	New Jersey	11	0	20.7	.319	.227	.800	5.0	1.1	.5	.3	6.1
2005	Philadelphia	4	0	12.3	.462	.375	.714	1.0	.3	.0	.5	5.0
Career		82	6	20.9	.392	.310	.734	3.9	1.4	.7	.5	7.9
