= Clifford Robinson (basketball, born 1966) =

American basketball player (1966–2020)

- Robinson in Survivor: Cagayan (2014)

Personal information
- Born: December 16, 1966 Buffalo, New York, U.S.
- Died: August 29, 2020 (aged 53) Portland, Oregon, U.S.
- Listed height: 6 ft 10 in (2.08 m)
- Listed weight: 245 lb (111 kg)

Career information
- High school: Riverside (Buffalo, New York)
- College: UConn (1985–1989)
- NBA draft: 1989: 2nd round, 36th overall pick
- Drafted by: Portland Trail Blazers
- Playing career: 1989–2007
- Position: Power forward / small forward
- Number: 3, 30

Career history
- 1989–1997: Portland Trail Blazers
- 1997–2001: Phoenix Suns
- 2001–2003: Detroit Pistons
- 2003–2005: Golden State Warriors
- 2005–2007: New Jersey Nets

Career highlights
- NBA All-Star (1994); 2× NBA All-Defensive Second Team (2000, 2002); NBA Sixth Man of the Year (1993); Second-team All-Big East (1989); Third-team All-Big East (1988)

Career statistics
- Points: 19,591 (14.6 ppg)
- Rebounds: 6,306 (4.6 rpg)
- Assists: 3,094 (2.2 apg)
- Stats at NBA.com
- Stats at Basketball Reference

Clifford Ralph Robinson (December 16, 1966 – August 29, 2020) was an American professional basketball player who played 18 seasons in the National Basketball Association (NBA). Selected in the second round of the 1989 NBA draft, he played the first eight seasons of his career with the Portland Trail Blazers, followed by stints with the Phoenix Suns, Detroit Pistons, Golden State Warriors, and New Jersey Nets. Robinson received the NBA Sixth Man of the Year Award in 1993 and was selected as an NBA All-Star in 1994. He played college basketball for the UConn Huskies.

== College basketball career ==
Robinson played four seasons at the University of Connecticut beginning in 1985. The Huskies won the 1988 National Invitation Tournament championship, and he was named to the all-tournament team. Robinson was later named to UConn's All-Century men's basketball team. On February 5, 2007, Robinson's number "00" was retired at Gampel Pavilion during halftime of a UConn basketball game against Syracuse as part of the "Huskies of Honor" ceremony which recognized personal accomplishments of 13 former players and 3 coaches.

== Professional basketball career ==
=== Portland Trail Blazers (1989–1997) ===
Robinson was selected with the 36th overall pick in the second round of the 1989 NBA draft by the Portland Trail Blazers. Robinson played for the Trail Blazers for eight seasons. Portland made the playoffs each year he was on the team, and played in the NBA Finals in 1990 and 1992. Robinson won the Sixth Man of the Year Award in 1992–93 after averaging 19.1 points, 6.6 rebounds and a career-best 1.99 blocks per game. He was an All-Star with the team in 1994. Following Game 4 of the 1992 Western Conference finals against the Utah Jazz, Robinson performed a victory dance that he later told press was named the "Uncle Cliffy". The nickname stuck with Robinson for the rest of his career. Following a game against the Golden State Warriors on February 22, 1995, Robinson was forced to end his 461 iron man streak of consecutive games played since the start of his career. This streak stands as a franchise record for the Trail Blazers.

=== Phoenix Suns (1997–2001) ===
Robinson signed with the Phoenix Suns as a free agent on August 25, 1997, where he remained for four more seasons. The highlight of his tenure with the Suns was registering a career-best 50 points against the Denver Nuggets on January 16, 2000. He became the oldest player in NBA history to register his first 50-point game, doing so at the age of 33 years and 2 months.

=== Detroit Pistons (2001–2003) ===
Robinson was traded to the Detroit Pistons on June 29, 2001, in exchange for Jud Buechler and John Wallace.

=== Golden State Warriors (2003–2005) ===
Robinson was traded to the Golden State Warriors on August 21, 2003, along with Pepe Sánchez, in exchange for Bob Sura. Although he played all 82 games during the regular season, it would be the first season in his career where he would not participate in the NBA playoffs.

=== New Jersey Nets (2005–2007) ===
On February 14, 2005, Golden State traded Robinson to the New Jersey Nets in exchange for two second-round draft picks. He played with the Nets for two more seasons until he was released by the team in July 2007. Robinson then retired.

=== Suspensions ===
Robinson was arrested for marijuana possession and driving under the influence in February 2001 and received a one-game suspension. Robinson was also suspended for five games in February 2005 while playing for Golden State, and was suspended for five games during the NBA playoffs on May 12, 2006, for violating terms of the league's drug policy for the second time in two seasons.

=== Retrospective ===
Robinson held career NBA per-game averages of 14.2 points, 4.6 rebounds, 1.05 steals, and 1.03 blocks. At the time of his retirement in 2007, his 1,380 NBA games played was the 7th-highest total in NBA history.

Robinson was one of only two players drafted in the 1980s that was still active in the league in 2007, with the other being Kevin Willis. He played in the NBA playoffs in all but one of his 18 seasons in the league.

At 6'10", he was the tallest player to make more than 1,000 three-pointers until he was surpassed by Dirk Nowitzki and Rashard Lewis.

== NBA career statistics ==
Legend
GP	Games played	GS	Games started	MPG	Minutes per game
FG%	Field goal percentage	3P%	3-point field goal percentage	FT%	Free throw percentage
RPG	Rebounds per game	APG	Assists per game	SPG	Steals per game
BPG	Blocks per game	PPG	Points per game	**Bold**	Career high
*	Led the league

=== Regular season ===
Clifford Robinson regular season statistics
Year	Team	GP	GS	MPG	FG%	3P%	FT%	RPG	APG	SPG	BPG	PPG
1989–90	Portland	**82**	0	19.1	.397	.273	.550	3.8	.9	.6	.6	9.1
1990–91	Portland	**82**	11	23.7	.463	.316	.653	4.3	1.8	1.0	.9	11.7
1991–92	Portland	**82**	7	25.9	.466	.091	.664	5.1	1.7	1.0	1.3	12.4
1992–93	Portland	**82**	12	31.4	.473	.247	.690	6.6	2.2	1.2	**2.0**	19.1
1993–94	Portland	**82**	64	34.8	.457	.245	.765	**6.7**	1.9	1.4	1.4	20.1
1994–95	Portland	75	73	36.3	.452	.371	.694	5.6	2.6	1.1	1.1	**21.3**
1995–96	Portland	78	76	**38.2**	.423	.378	.664	5.7	2.4	1.1	.9	21.1
1996–97	Portland	81	79	38.0	.426	.346	.696	4.0	3.2	1.2	.8	15.1
1997–98	Phoenix	80	64	29.5	**.479**	.321	.689	5.1	2.1	1.2	1.1	14.2
1998–99	Phoenix	50*	35	34.8	.475	**.417**	.697	4.5	2.6	**1.5**	1.2	16.4
1999–00	Phoenix	80	67	35.5	.464	.370	**.782**	4.5	2.8	1.1	.8	18.5
2000–01	Phoenix	**82**	**82***	33.5	.422	.361	.709	4.1	2.9	1.1	1.0	16.4
2001–02	Detroit	80	80	35.7	.425	.378	.694	4.8	2.5	1.1	1.2	14.6
2002–03	Detroit	81	69	34.9	.398	.336	.676	3.9	**3.3**	1.1	1.1	12.2
2003–04	Golden State	**82**	**82**	34.7	.387	.357	.711	4.1	**3.3**	.9	.9	11.8
2004–05	Golden State	42	29	26.0	.398	.331	.603	2.7	1.8	1.0	.9	8.5
2004–05	New Jersey	29	0	20.7	.361	.379	.692	3.3	1.0	.6	.5	6.0
2005–06	New Jersey	80	13	23.3	.427	.343	.658	3.3	1.1	.6	.5	6.9
2006–07	New Jersey	50	1	19.1	.372	.379	.444	2.4	1.0	.2	.5	4.1
Career		1380	844	30.8	.438	.356	.689	4.6	2.2	1.0	1.0	14.2
All-Star		1	0	18.0	.625	.000	–	2.0	5.0	1.0	.0	10.0

=== Playoffs ===
Clifford Robinson playoffs statistics
Year	Team	GP	GS	MPG	FG%	3P%	FT%	RPG	APG	SPG	BPG	PPG
1990	Portland	**21**	6	18.6	.358	.000	.558	4.1	1.1	.9	1.1	6.5
1991	Portland	16	0	22.1	**.538**	.333	.551	3.9	1.1	.4	1.0	10.3
1992	Portland	**21**	0	24.9	.462	.167	.571	4.2	2.0	1.0	1.0	10.8
1993	Portland	4	0	32.8	.262	.000	.409	4.3	1.5	1.5	1.8	10.3
1994	Portland	4	4	37.3	.412	.222	.875	6.3	2.5	.8	1.5	16.3
1995	Portland	3	3	39.7	.362	.235	.563	6.3	2.7	.7	.3	15.7
1996	Portland	5	5	36.2	.344	.261	.757	3.6	1.6	1.4	1.0	15.2
1997	Portland	4	4	40.3	.362	.188	.688	**6.8**	**3.0**	.5	1.0	12.0
1998	Phoenix	4	4	23.0	.273	.000	.778	3.0	.8	.8	.5	6.3
1999	Phoenix	3	3	39.0	.475	.222	.636	5.3	2.7	**2.0**	.3	15.7
2000	Phoenix	9	9	37.0	.386	.325	.733	6.0	2.1	1.2	.8	**17.6**
2001	Phoenix	4	4	28.5	.420	.250	.636	4.0	1.0	1.5	.5	15.0
2002	Detroit	10	10	**40.9**	.363	.340	.800	3.0	2.9	1.8	**1.9**	13.2
2003	Detroit	17	**17**	30.8	.358	.373	.595	2.7	2.9	.9	.8	9.3
2005	New Jersey	4	0	17.8	.407	.286	**1.000**	2.5	1.3	.8	.3	7.0
2006	New Jersey	8	0	24.8	.333	.316	.800	3.3	.6	1.1	.4	4.5
2007	New Jersey	4	0	5.0	.167	**.500**	.0	.0	.0	.3	.0	.8
Career		141	69	27.6	.393	.298	.629	3.9	1.8	1.0	.9	10.3

== Post-NBA endeavors ==
=== Survivor ===
Robinson was a contestant in the 28th installment of the American reality television series Survivor (filmed in 2013 and broadcast the following year). Although he did not initially plan to reveal his identity, he was recognized by another contestant. He was the fifth contestant of the season to be voted out, finishing in 14th place.

=== Basketball diplomacy ===
In 2014, Robinson was named to a team assembled by Dennis Rodman as part of his "basketball diplomacy" effort in North Korea with the job of playing an exhibition match against the Northern Korean Senior National Basketball Team to celebrate the birthday of Kim Jong-un. The team also included Kenny Anderson, Vin Baker, Craig Hodges, Doug Christie, Sleepy Floyd, Charles D. Smith, and four "streetballers".

=== Cannabis entrepreneurship ===
During his post-basketball life, Robinson became an entrepreneur in the cannabis industry, selling assorted cannabis products under his "Uncle Cliffy" brand name. He was also an advocate for the legalization of cannabis, supporting efforts to reform cannabis laws in the states of Oregon and Connecticut. During his time in the NBA, Robinson used cannabis to help relieve pain and anxiety, and to avoid the undesirable side effects caused by pharmaceutical drugs. He partially attributed the longevity of his NBA career to his use of cannabis.

Robinson appeared in the 2019 Netflix film Grass Is Greener, which examines the history of cannabis prohibition in the United States.

== Personal life ==
On September 21, 2003, Robinson married Heather Lufkins on the island of Barbados. His son Isaiah Robinson played basketball for the Jefferson High School Democrats in Portland and for the Houston Baptist Huskies.

=== Health issues and death ===
Robinson suffered a stroke in March 2017 that paralyzed the left side of his body, but he soon recovered much of his arm and leg movement. He had a tumor removed from his jaw in March 2018.

In March 2019, Robinson underwent surgery for cancer. He died of lymphoma on August 29, 2020, at the age of 53.

== See also ==
- List of NBA career blocks leaders
- List of NBA career personal fouls leaders
- List of NBA career games played leaders
- List of oldest and youngest NBA players
