= 1999–2000 New Jersey Nets season =

NBA professional basketball team season

- Head coach: Don Casey
- Owners: Lewis Katz
- Arena: Continental Airlines Arena

Results
- Record: 31–51 (.378)
- Place: Division: 6th (Atlantic); Conference: 11th (Eastern)
- Playoff finish: Did not qualify
- Stats at Basketball Reference

Local media
- Television: WLNY; Fox Sports Net New York; Metro-TV
- Radio: WOR

The 1999–2000 New Jersey Nets season was the Nets' 33rd season in the National Basketball Association, and 24th season in East Rutherford, New Jersey.

== Season summary ==
=== Off-season ===
During the off-season, the team re-acquired former Nets guard Johnny Newman from the Los Angeles Clippers, and re-signed free agent and former Nets guard Sherman Douglas.

=== Regular season ===
With the addition of Newman, and without Jayson Williams, who missed the entire regular season due to a knee injury sustained from the previous season, the Nets struggled losing 15 of their first 17 games of the season, which included a seven-game losing streak in November. Despite the awful start, the team eventually got hot by winning 13 of their next 18 games, and later on holding a 19–30 record at the All-Star break. The Nets found themselves near playoff position with a 31–40 record as of March 30, 2000. However, a rash of late-season injures cost the team to lose their final eleven games of the season, finishing in sixth place in the Atlantic Division with a 31–51 record.

Stephon Marbury averaged 22.2 points, 8.4 assists and 1.5 steals per game, and was named to the All-NBA Third Team, while Keith Van Horn averaged 19.2 points and 8.5 rebounds per game, and Kendall Gill provided the team with 13.1 points and 1.8 steals per game. In addition, Kerry Kittles provided with 13.0 points and 1.3 steals per game, but only played 62 games due to a knee injury, while Newman contributed 10.0 points per game, Lucious Harris contributed 6.7 points per game, and Scott Burrell provided with 6.1 points and 3.5 rebounds per game. On the defensive side, Jamie Feick averaged 5.7 points and 9.3 rebounds per game, and Jim McIlvaine provided with 2.4 points, 3.5 rebounds and 1.8 blocks per game.

During the regular season, Marbury and Gill both reached different milestones, as Marbury dished out his 2,000th career assist, and Gill scored his 10,000th career point. Gill also finished tied in eighth place in Defensive Player of the Year voting. The Nets finished 17th in the NBA in home-game attendance, with an attendance of 643,631 at the Continental Airlines Arena during the regular season.

=== Aftermath ===
Following the season, head coach Don Casey was fired, Burrell and Gheorghe Mureșan were both released to free agency, Elliot Perry signed as a free agent with the Orlando Magic, and Williams retired after nine seasons in the NBA.

== Offseason ==
=== NBA draft ===
Round	Pick	Player	Position	Nationality	College
2	34	Evan Eschmeyer	C	United States	Northwestern

== Roster ==
1999–2000 New Jersey Nets roster
Players

Pos.	No.	Player	Height	Weight	DOB	From
F	24	Scott Burrell	6 ft 7 in (2.01 m)	218 lb (99 kg)	1971-01-12	Connecticut
G	11	Sherman Douglas (injured)	6 ft 0 in (1.83 m)	180 lb (82 kg)	1966-09-15	Syracuse
C	00	Evan Eschmeyer (injured)	6 ft 11 in (2.11 m)	255 lb (116 kg)	1975-05-30	Northwestern
F	14	Jamie Feick	6 ft 9 in (2.06 m)	255 lb (116 kg)	1974-07-03	Michigan State
G/F	13	Kendall Gill	6 ft 5 in (1.96 m)	195 lb (88 kg)	1968-05-25	Illinois
G	12	Lucious Harris	6 ft 5 in (1.96 m)	190 lb (86 kg)	1970-12-18	Long Beach State
G	30	Kerry Kittles (injured)	6 ft 5 in (1.96 m)	179 lb (81 kg)	1974-06-12	Villanova
G	33	Stephon Marbury (injured)	6 ft 2 in (1.88 m)	180 lb (82 kg)	1977-02-20	Georgia Tech
C	22	Jim McIlvaine	7 ft 1 in (2.16 m)	240 lb (109 kg)	1972-07-30	Marquette
C	77	Gheorghe Mureșan	7 ft 7 in (2.31 m)	303 lb (137 kg)	1971-02-14	Romania
F	20	Johnny Newman	6 ft 7 in (2.01 m)	190 lb (86 kg)	1963-11-28	Richmond
G	1	Elliot Perry	6 ft 0 in (1.83 m)	150 lb (68 kg)	1969-03-28	Memphis
F	44	Keith Van Horn	6 ft 10 in (2.08 m)	220 lb (100 kg)	1975-10-23	Utah
C	55	Jayson Williams (injured) (IN)	6 ft 9 in (2.06 m)	240 lb (109 kg)	1968-02-22	St. John's

Coaches
Head coach
- Don Casey
Assistant(s)
- Eddie Jordan
- Jim Lynam
- Mike O'Koren

Legend
- (DP) Unsigned draft pick
- (FA) Free agent
- (S) Suspended
- (IN) Inactive
- Injured

Roster

Roster notes

- Center Jayson Williams was on the injured reserve list due to a leg injury, and missed the entire regular season.

== Regular season ==
The Nets started the season at 2–15, a franchise record low. Despite the poor start, the Nets rallied back to compete for a playoff spot. The Nets were still alive in the playoff race at the beginning of April with three weeks left in the season. After the first week of April, the team was without their leading scorer, Stephon Marbury, who struggled with knee injuries. Other injuries included rookie Evan Eschmeyer (ankle), and starting shooting guard Kerry Kittles (knee). The Nets were officially eliminated from playoff contention on April 7 after a 103–85 loss to the Miami Heat. The team finished the season by losing their final 11 games of the year.

=== Season standings ===
Atlantic Division	W	L	PCT	GB	Home	Road	Div
y-Miami Heat	52	30	.634	–	33–8	19–22	18–6
x-New York Knicks	50	32	.610	2	33–8	17–24	14–10
x-Philadelphia 76ers	49	33	.598	3	29–12	20–21	13–11
Orlando Magic	41	41	.500	11	26–15	15–26	12–13
Boston Celtics	35	47	.427	17	26–15	9–32	12–12
New Jersey Nets	31	51	.378	21	22–19	9–32	9–16
Washington Wizards	29	53	.354	23	17–24	12–29	7–17

#	Eastern Conference				
#	Team	W	L	PCT	GB
1	c-Indiana Pacers	56	26	.683	–
2	y-Miami Heat	52	30	.634	4
3	x-New York Knicks	50	32	.610	6
4	x-Charlotte Hornets	49	33	.598	7
5	x-Philadelphia 76ers	49	33	.598	7
6	x-Toronto Raptors	45	37	.549	11
7	x-Detroit Pistons	42	40	.512	14
8	x-Milwaukee Bucks	42	40	.512	14
9	Orlando Magic	41	41	.500	15
10	Boston Celtics	35	47	.427	21
11	Cleveland Cavaliers	32	50	.390	24
12	New Jersey Nets	31	51	.378	25
13	Washington Wizards	29	53	.354	27
14	Atlanta Hawks	28	54	.341	28
15	Chicago Bulls	17	65	.207	39

== Player statistics ==
Legend
GP	Games played	GS	Games started	MPG	Minutes per game
FG%	Field-goal percentage	3P%	3-point field-goal percentage	FT%	Free-throw percentage
RPG	Rebounds per game	APG	Assists per game	SPG	Steals per game
BPG	Blocks per game	PPG	Points per game

=== Regular season ===
New Jersey Nets statistics
Player	GP	GS	MPG	FG%	3P%	FT%	RPG	APG	SPG	BPG	PPG
Stephon Marbury	74	74	38.9	.432	.283	.813	3.2	8.4	1.5	0.2	22.2
Keith Van Horn	80	80	34.8	.445	.368	.847	8.5	2.0	0.8	0.8	19.2
Kendall Gill	76	75	31.0	.414	.256	.710	3.7	2.8	1.8	0.5	13.1
Kerry Kittles	62	61	30.6	.437	.400	.795	3.6	2.3	1.3	0.3	13.0
Johnny Newman	82	9	21.5	.446	.379	.838	1.9	0.8	0.6	0.1	10.0
Lucious Harris	77	11	19.6	.428	.330	.798	2.4	1.3	0.8	0.1	6.7
Scott Burrell	74	9	18.1	.394	.353	.780	3.5	1.0	0.9	0.6	6.1
Sherman Douglas	20	2	15.5	.500	.313	.893	1.5	1.7	0.9	0.0	6.0
Jamie Feick	81	17	27.7	.428	1.000	.707	9.3	0.8	0.5	0.5	5.7
Elliot Perry	60	5	13.4	.435	.282	.806	1.0	2.3	0.7	0.0	5.3
Gheorge Muresan	30	2	8.9	.456		.605	2.3	0.3	0.0	0.4	3.5
Evan Eschmeyer	31	5	12.0	.528		.500	3.5	0.7	0.3	0.7	2.9
Jim McIlvaine	66	53	15.9	.416		.518	3.5	0.5	0.4	1.8	2.4
Michael Cage	20	7	12.1	.500		1.000	4.1	0.5	0.4	0.4	1.4
Mark Hendrickson	5	0	4.8	.000		.500	0.4	0.6	0.0	0.0	0.2

Player statistics citation:

== Awards and records ==
- Stephon Marbury, All-NBA Third Team
