= 2001–02 Indiana Pacers season =

Basketball team season

- Head coach: Isiah Thomas
- General manager: Donnie Walsh
- Arena: Conseco Fieldhouse

Results
- Record: 42–40 (.512)
- Place: Division: 4th (Central); Conference: 8th (Eastern)
- Playoff finish: First Round (lost to Nets 2–3)
- Stats at Basketball Reference

Local media
- Television: WTTV; Fox Sports Net Midwest
- Radio: WIBC

The 2001–02 Indiana Pacers season was the 26th season for the Indiana Pacers in the National Basketball Association, and their 35th season as a franchise.

== Season summary ==
=== Off-season ===
During the off-season, the Pacers acquired rookie point guard, and first-round draft pick Jamaal Tinsley out of Iowa State University from the Atlanta Hawks on draft day; the Hawks had acquired Tinsley from the Memphis Grizzlies, who drafted him. The Pacers also signed free agent Carlos Rogers.

=== Regular season ===
With the addition of Tinsley, the Pacers won six of their first eight games of the regular season, but then lost seven of their next nine games, and played around .500 in winning percentage for most of the first half of the season, holding a 25–25 record at the All-Star break. At mid-season, the team traded Jalen Rose, and Travis Best to the Chicago Bulls in exchange for Ron Artest, Brad Miller, Ron Mercer and Kevin Ollie. With a 37–40 record as of April 8, 2002, the Pacers managed to win their final five games of the season, finishing in fourth place in the Central Division with a 42–40 record, and earning the eighth seed in the Eastern Conference; the team qualified for the NBA playoffs for the fifth consecutive year.

Jermaine O'Neal averaged 19.0 points, 10.5 rebounds and 2.3 blocks per game, and was named the NBA Most Improved Player of the Year, and was also named to the All-NBA Third Team. In addition, Reggie Miller averaged 16.5 points per game and led the Pacers with 180 three-point field goals, while Brad Miller provided the team with 15.1 points and 7.9 rebounds per game in 28 games after the trade, and Al Harrington played a sixth man role off the bench, averaging 13.1 points and 6.3 rebounds per game, but was out for the remainder of the season due to a torn ACL after 44 games. Meanwhile, Artest contributed 10.9 points, 5.0 rebounds and 2.4 steals per game in 28 games, and Tinsley provided with 9.4 points, 8.1 assists and 1.7 steals per game, and was named to the NBA All-Rookie Second Team. Off the bench, Jonathan Bender contributed 7.4 points and 3.1 rebounds per game, while Austin Croshere provided with 6.8 points and 3.9 rebounds per game, and Jeff Foster, who started at center for half of the regular season, averaged 5.7 points and 6.8 rebounds per game.

During the NBA All-Star weekend at the First Union Center in Philadelphia, Pennsylvania, O'Neal was selected for the 2002 NBA All-Star Game, as a member of the Eastern Conference All-Star team; it was his first ever All-Star appearance. Meanwhile, Tinsley was selected for the NBA Rookie Challenge Game, as a member of the Rookies team. Tinsley also finished tied in third place in Rookie of the Year voting, while head coach Isiah Thomas finished tied in seventh place in Coach of the Year voting.

The Pacers finished 16th in the NBA in home-game attendance, with an attendance of 686,537 at the Conseco Fieldhouse during the regular season.

=== NBA playoffs ===
In the Eastern Conference First Round of the 2002 NBA playoffs, the Pacers faced off against the top–seeded, and Atlantic Division champion New Jersey Nets, who were led by the trio of All-Star guard Jason Kidd, second-year star Kenyon Martin, and Keith Van Horn. The Pacers won Game 1 over the Nets on the road, 89–83 at the Continental Airlines Arena, but then lost the next two games as the Nets took a 2–1 series lead. The Pacers managed to win Game 4 over the Nets at home, 97–74 at the Conseco Fieldhouse to even the series. However, the Pacers lost Game 5 to the Nets at the Continental Airlines Arena in double-overtime, 120–109, thus losing in a hard-fought five-game series.

The Nets would advance to the NBA Finals for the first time in franchise history, but would lose to the 2-time defending NBA champion Los Angeles Lakers in a four-game sweep in the 2002 NBA Finals.

=== Aftermath ===
Following the season, Ollie signed as a free agent with the Milwaukee Bucks, and Rogers was released to free agency.

== Offseason ==
=== Draft picks ===
Round	Pick	Player	Position	Nationality	College
2	40	Jamison Brewer	PG	United States	Auburn

== Roster ==
2001–02 Indiana Pacers roster
Players

Pos.	No.	Player	Height	Weight	DOB	From
F	15	Ron Artest	6 ft 7 in (2.01 m)	244 lb (111 kg)	1979–11–13	St. John's
F	24	Jonathan Bender	6 ft 11 in (2.11 m)	202 lb (92 kg)	1980–01–30	Picayune Memorial HS (MS)
G	2	Jamison Brewer	6 ft 4 in (1.93 m)	184 lb (83 kg)	1980–11–09	Auburn
C	27	Primož Brezec	7 ft 2 in (2.18 m)	252 lb (114 kg)	1979–10–02	Slovenia
F	44	Austin Croshere	6 ft 9 in (2.06 m)	235 lb (107 kg)	1975–05–01	Providence
C	10	Jeff Foster	6 ft 11 in (2.11 m)	250 lb (113 kg)	1977–01–16	Texas State
F	3	Al Harrington (injured)	6 ft 9 in (2.06 m)	230 lb (104 kg)	1980–02–17	St. Patrick HS (NJ)
G	5	Ron Mercer	6 ft 7 in (2.01 m)	210 lb (95 kg)	1976–05–18	Kentucky
C	52	Brad Miller	6 ft 11 in (2.11 m)	244 lb (111 kg)	1976–04–12	Purdue
G	31	Reggie Miller	6 ft 7 in (2.01 m)	185 lb (84 kg)	1965–08–24	UCLA
F	7	Jermaine O'Neal	6 ft 11 in (2.11 m)	260 lb (118 kg)	1978–10–13	Eau Claire HS (SC)
G	12	Kevin Ollie	6 ft 4 in (1.93 m)	195 lb (88 kg)	1972–12–27	Connecticut
F	6	Carlos Rogers	6 ft 11 in (2.11 m)	220 lb (100 kg)	1971–02–06	Tennessee State
C	40	Bruno Sundov	7 ft 2 in (2.18 m)	220 lb (100 kg)	1980–02–10	Croatia
G	11	Jamaal Tinsley	6 ft 3 in (1.91 m)	195 lb (88 kg)	1978–02–28	Iowa State

Coaches
Head coach
- Isiah Thomas
Assistant(s)
- Vern Fleming
- Brendan Malone
- Tree Rollins
- Jim Staak

Legend
- (DP) Unsigned draft pick
- (FA) Free agent
- (S) Suspended
- Injured

Roster
Updated: 2002-02-19

== Regular season ==
=== Season standings ===
Central Division	W	L	PCT	GB	Home	Road	Div
y-Detroit Pistons	50	32	.610	–	26–15	24–17	20–8
x-Charlotte Hornets	44	38	.537	6	21–20	23–18	17–11
x-Toronto Raptors	42	40	.512	8	24–17	18–23	17–11
x-Indiana Pacers	42	40	.512	8	25–16	17–24	13–15
e-Milwaukee Bucks	41	41	.500	9	25–16	16–25	17–11
e-Atlanta Hawks	33	49	.402	17	23–18	10–31	11–17
e-Cleveland Cavaliers	29	53	.354	21	20–21	9–32	12–16
e-Chicago Bulls	21	61	.256	29	14–27	7–34	5–23

#	Eastern Conference				
#	Team	W	L	PCT	GB
1	c-New Jersey Nets	52	30	.634	–
2	y-Detroit Pistons	50	32	.610	2
3	x-Boston Celtics	49	33	.598	3
4	x-Charlotte Hornets	44	38	.537	8
5	x-Orlando Magic	44	38	.537	8
6	x-Philadelphia 76ers	43	39	.524	9
7	x-Toronto Raptors	42	40	.512	10
8	x-Indiana Pacers	42	40	.512	10
9	e-Milwaukee Bucks	41	41	.500	11
10	e-Washington Wizards	37	45	.451	15
11	e-Miami Heat	36	46	.439	16
12	e-Atlanta Hawks	33	49	.402	19
13	e-New York Knicks	30	52	.366	22
14	e-Cleveland Cavaliers	29	53	.354	23
15	e-Chicago Bulls	21	61	.256	31

== Playoffs ==
2002 playoff game log
First round: 2–3 (home: 1–1; road: 1–2)

Game	Date	Team	Score	High points	High rebounds	High assists	Location Attendance	Series
1	April 20	@ New Jersey	W 89–83	Jermaine O'Neal (30)	Brad Miller (12)	Jamaal Tinsley (7)	Continental Airlines Arena; 18,555	1–0
2	April 22	@ New Jersey	L 79–95	Reggie Miller (26)	Artest, O'Neal (6)	Jamaal Tinsley (5)	Continental Airlines Arena; 20,049	1–1
3	April 26	New Jersey	L 84–85	Reggie Miller (30)	Jeff Foster (12)	Jamaal Tinsley (9)	Conseco Fieldhouse; 18,345	1–2
4	April 30	New Jersey	W 97–74	Artest, Croshere (18)	Artest, B. Miller (8)	Kevin Ollie (9)	Conseco Fieldhouse; 18,345	2–2
5	May 2	@ New Jersey	L 109–120 (2OT)	Reggie Miller (31)	Brad Miller (17)	Kevin Ollie (8)	Continental Airlines Arena; 20,049	2–3

2002 schedule

== Player statistics ==
=== Ragular season ===
Player	POS	GP	GS	MP	REB	AST	STL	BLK	PTS	MPG	RPG	APG	SPG	BPG	PPG
Jeff Foster	C	82	48	1,786	556	70	71	38	467	21.8	6.8	.9	.9	.5	5.7
Jamaal Tinsley	PG	80	78	2,442	298	647	138	40	751	30.5	3.7	8.1	1.7	.5	9.4
Reggie Miller	SG	79	79	2,889	219	253	88	10	1,304	36.6	2.8	3.2	1.1	.1	16.5
Jonathan Bender	SF	78	17	1,647	244	62	19	49	581	21.1	3.1	.8	.2	.6	7.4
Austin Croshere	PF	76	1	1,286	294	77	26	29	516	16.9	3.9	1.0	.3	.4	6.8
Jermaine O'Neal	PF	72	72	2,707	757	118	45	166	1,371	37.6	10.5	1.6	.6	2.3	19.0
Jalen Rose^{†}	SF	53	53	1,937	249	197	45	29	982	36.5	4.7	3.7	.8	.5	18.5
Travis Best^{†}	PG	44	3	954	70	175	57	6	302	21.7	1.6	4.0	1.3	.1	6.9
Al Harrington	PF	44	1	1,313	276	54	41	21	576	29.8	6.3	1.2	.9	.5	13.1
Kevin Ollie^{†}	PG	29	0	577	56	98	26	1	158	19.9	1.9	3.4	.9	.0	5.4
Brad Miller^{†}	C	28	28	872	220	51	24	12	424	31.1	7.9	1.8	.9	.4	15.1
Ron Artest^{†}	SF	28	24	819	140	50	66	16	306	29.3	5.0	1.8	2.4	.6	10.9
Primož Brezec	C	22	4	160	28	6	0	7	43	7.3	1.3	.3	.0	.3	2.0
Carlos Rogers	C	22	1	168	38	3	5	6	59	7.6	1.7	.1	.2	.3	2.7
Bruno Šundov	C	22	0	88	21	3	3	3	32	4.0	1.0	.1	.1	.1	1.5
Ron Mercer^{†}	SG	13	1	213	23	10	2	3	62	16.4	1.8	.8	.2	.2	4.8
Jamison Brewer	SG	13	0	43	8	9	2	0	4	3.3	.6	.7	.2	.0	.3
Norman Richardson^{†}	SG	3	0	4	1	1	0	0	0	1.3	.3	.3	.0	.0	.0

- ^{†} Denotes player spent time with another team in the season. Stats reflect time with the Pacers only.

=== Playoffs ===
Player	POS	GP	GS	MP	REB	AST	STL	BLK	PTS	MPG	RPG	APG	SPG	BPG	PPG
Reggie Miller	SG	5	5	198	16	14	8	1	118	39.6	3.2	2.8	1.6	.2	23.6
Jermaine O'Neal	PF	5	5	192	38	5	4	8	86	38.4	7.6	1.0	.8	1.6	17.2
Brad Miller	C	5	5	180	49	7	4	2	56	36.0	9.8	1.4	.8	.4	11.2
Ron Artest	SF	5	5	167	30	16	13	3	59	33.4	6.0	3.2	2.6	.6	11.8
Jamaal Tinsley	PG	5	5	88	10	25	2	0	18	17.6	2.0	5.0	.4	.0	3.6
Kevin Ollie	PG	5	0	118	12	23	3	0	29	23.6	2.4	4.6	.6	.0	5.8
Ron Mercer	SG	5	0	117	10	4	1	1	39	23.4	2.0	.8	.2	.2	7.8
Jeff Foster	C	5	0	78	24	7	3	1	20	15.6	4.8	1.4	.6	.2	4.0
Jonathan Bender	SF	5	0	45	4	2	2	3	6	9.0	.8	.4	.4	.6	1.2
Austin Croshere	PF	4	0	59	14	2	1	1	24	14.8	3.5	.5	.3	.3	6.0
Jamison Brewer	SG	2	0	6	4	1	0	0	1	3.0	2.0	.5	.0	.0	.5
Bruno Šundov	C	1	0	2	0	0	0	0	2	2.0	.0	.0	.0	.0	2.0

== Awards and records ==
- Jermaine O'Neal, NBA Most Improved Player Award
- Jermaine O'Neal, NBA All-Star Game
- Jermaine O'Neal, All-NBA Third Team
- Jamaal Tinsley, NBA All-Rookie Team 2nd Team

== Transactions ==
=== Trades ===
February 19, 2002	To Indiana Pacers Kevin Ollie	To Chicago Bulls Travis Best
February 19, 2002	To Indiana Pacers Ron Artest, Brad Miller and Ron Mercer	To Chicago Bulls Jalen Rose, Norm Richardson, and a second-round draft pick

Player Transactions Citation:
