= 2001–02 Chicago Bulls season =

NBA professional basketball team season

- Head coach: Tim Floyd, Bill Cartwright
- General manager: Jerry Krause
- Owners: Jerry Reinsdorf
- Arena: United Center

Results
- Record: 21–61 (.256)
- Place: Division: 8th (Central); Conference: 15th (Eastern)
- Playoff finish: Did not qualify
- Stats at Basketball Reference

Local media
- Television: WGN-TV; WCIU-TV; Fox Sports Net Chicago
- Radio: WMVP

The 2001–02 Chicago Bulls season was the 36th season for the Chicago Bulls in the National Basketball Association.

== Season summary ==
=== Off-season ===
After finishing with a league-worst 15–67 record the previous season, the Bulls received the fourth overall pick in the 2001 NBA draft, and selected center and high school basketball star Eddy Curry. The team also acquired rookie center, first-round draft pick, and high school basketball star Tyson Chandler from the Los Angeles Clippers on draft day; the Clippers selected Chandler with the second overall pick in the draft. During the off-season, the Bulls re-acquired former forward Charles Oakley from the Toronto Raptors, acquired Greg Anthony from the Portland Trail Blazers, and signed free agents Eddie Robinson, and Kevin Ollie. Oakley had played three seasons for the Bulls from 1985 to 1988.

=== Regular season ===
With the addition of Chandler, Curry, Anthony and Oakley, the Bulls continued to struggled losing 23 of their first 27 games of the regular season, posting a 10-game losing streak in November. Head coach Tim Floyd resigned on Christmas Eve after a 4–21 start to the season, then after two games under assistant coach Bill Berry as an interim coach, the team hired former Bulls center Bill Cartwright as their new coach. At mid-season, the Bulls traded Ollie, Ron Mercer, Ron Artest, and Brad Miller to the Indiana Pacers in exchange for Jalen Rose and Travis Best, while Anthony was released to free agency, and later on signed with the Milwaukee Bucks. The Bulls struggled all season long finishing in last place in the Central Division with a 21–61 record; their record was also tied with the Golden State Warriors as the worst regular-season record in the league.

Rose averaged 23.8 points and 5.3 assists per game in 30 games after the trade, while second-year forward Marcus Fizer averaged 12.3 points and 5.6 rebounds per game, and Best provided the team with 9.3 points and 5.0 assists per game in 30 games. In addition, second-year guard Jamal Crawford contributed 9.3 points per game, but only played just 23 games due to a torn ACL, while Robinson provided with 9.0 points per game, but only played just 29 games also due to injury, and rookie shooting guard, and second-round draft pick Trenton Hassell contributed 8.7 points per game. Meanwhile, Curry averaged 6.7 points and 3.8 rebounds per game, Chandler averaged 6.1 points, 4.8 rebounds and 1.3 blocks per game, Fred Hoiberg contributed 4.4 points per game, and Oakley provided with 3.8 points and 6.0 rebounds per game.

During the NBA All-Star weekend at the First Union Center in Philadelphia, Pennsylvania, Fizer was selected for the NBA Rookie Challenge Game, as a member of the Sophomores team. The Bulls finished ninth in the NBA in home-game attendance, with an attendance of 776,311 at the United Center during the regular season.

=== Aftermath ===
Following the season, Oakley signed as a free agent with the Washington Wizards, and Best signed with the Miami Heat. (See 2001–02 Chicago Bulls season#Regular season)

== NBA draft ==
Round	Pick	Player	Position	Nationality	College / Club Team
1	4	Eddy Curry	C	United States	
2	29	Trenton Hassell	SG	United States	Austin Peay
2	44	Sean Lampley	SF	United States	California

== Roster ==
2001–02 Chicago Bulls roster
Players

Pos.	No.	Player	Height	Weight	DOB	From
C	44	Dalibor Bagaric	7 ft 1 in (2.16 m)	255 lb (116 kg)	1980–02–07	Croatia
G	6	Travis Best	5 ft 11 in (1.80 m)	182 lb (83 kg)	1972–07–12	Georgia Tech
F/C	3	Tyson Chandler	7 ft 1 in (2.16 m)	235 lb (107 kg)	1982–10–02	Dominguez HS (CA)
G	1	Jamal Crawford	6 ft 6 in (1.98 m)	185 lb (84 kg)	1980–03–20	Michigan
C	2	Eddy Curry	6 ft 11 in (2.11 m)	285 lb (129 kg)	1982–12–05	Thornwood HS (IL)
F	21	Marcus Fizer	6 ft 9 in (2.06 m)	262 lb (119 kg)	1978–08–10	Iowa State
G	11	A.J. Guyton	6 ft 1 in (1.85 m)	180 lb (82 kg)	1978–02–12	Indiana
G/F	22	Trenton Hassell	6 ft 5 in (1.96 m)	200 lb (91 kg)	1979–03–04	Austin Peay
G	20	Fred Hoiberg	6 ft 4 in (1.93 m)	203 lb (92 kg)	1972–10–15	Iowa State
F/C	34	Charles Oakley (injured)	6 ft 8 in (2.03 m)	225 lb (102 kg)	1963–12–18	Virginia Union
G	31	Norm Richardson	6 ft 5 in (1.96 m)	190 lb (86 kg)	1979–07–24	Hofstra
G/F	32	Eddie Robinson	6 ft 8 in (2.03 m)	210 lb (95 kg)	1976–04–19	Central Oklahoma
G/F	5	Jalen Rose	6 ft 8 in (2.03 m)	210 lb (95 kg)	1973–01–30	Michigan

Coaches
Head coach
- Tim Floyd (resigned)
- Bill Berry (interim)
- Bill Cartwright
Assistant(s)
- Norm Ellenberger
- Pete Myers
- Fred Tedeschi (trainer)

Legend
- (DP) Unsigned draft pick
- (FA) Free agent
- (S) Suspended
- Injured

Roster
Updated: March 1, 2002

== Regular season ==
In 2001-02, the make-up and direction of the Chicago Bulls changed significantly: by the season's end, a pair of 18-year-old phenoms and an All-Star caliber player were in the line-up while Elton Brand, once thought to be the franchise's cornerstone for rebuilding efforts, was not. The result was a renewed sense of optimism and hope surrounding the team's future with Tyson Chandler, Eddy Curry and Jalen Rose as the centers of attention.

It all began on the night of the 2001 NBA draft, when the Bulls used their first-round pick, fourth overall, to select Thornwood High School's Eddy Curry, a 6–11, 285-pound center. Minutes later, Chicago dealt Brand to the L.A. Clippers for Dominguez High School product Tyson Chandler (picked second overall) and Brian Skinner. Chicago also acquired one of the steals of the draft in Trenton Hassell out of Austin Peay in the second round.

With the addition of free agent Eddie Robinson (signed Aug. 7), the new look Bulls, a young and athletic squad, were ready to take the floor. The importance of having NBA experience was again displayed as the team struggled and finished the season 21–61. The beginning of the year was not pleasant for Chicago. The Bulls set a franchise record for worst loss with a 53-point loss to the Minnesota Timberwolves on Nov. 8, Head Coach Tim Floyd, who compiled a 49–190 record over four seasons with the club, resigned on Christmas Eve. Bill Berry was named interim coach and four days later, Bill Cartwright was named head coach on Dec. 28.

The team went on to suffer an 18-game road losing streak from Nov. 2 to Jan. 11. On Feb. 18, the Bulls grabbed a franchise-low 25 rebounds in Miami.

A change was needed and on February 19, it was delivered in the form of a seven-player trade. The Bulls acquired Jalen Rose, Travis Best and Norman Richardson from the Indiana Pacers for Brad Miller, Ron Artest, Ron Mercer and Kevin Ollie.

“Following the trade, Executive Vice President of Basketball Operations Jerry Krause praised Rose's versatility, noting his ability to play multiple positions offensively and defensively, as well as his passing, scoring ability, and leadership qualities.”

“I'm excited about it,” Rose said upon his arrival to Chicago. “I embrace the opportunity. Every kid dreams about standing in this position talking about having an opportunity to take a team to a championship level.”

The team went on to post their first three-game winning streak in two years from Feb. 20–23. Jamal Crawford, who tore his ACL over the summer and required surgery to repair it, returned to the active roster on March 3 after missing the first 58 games of the season. On March 11, the Bulls and Bill Cartwright mutually agreed to a three-year extension on the head coach's contract. Other notes from the season included Marcus Fizer’s (sophomore team) participation in the Schick Rookie Challenge at All-Star Weekend and Trenton Hassell being named to the NBA’s ‘got milk?’ Rookie of the Month for February.

=== Season standings ===
Central Division	W	L	PCT	GB	Home	Road	Div
y-Detroit Pistons	50	32	.610	–	26–15	24–17	20–8
x-Charlotte Hornets	44	38	.537	6	21–20	23–18	17–11
x-Toronto Raptors	42	40	.512	8	24–17	18–23	17–11
x-Indiana Pacers	42	40	.512	8	25–16	17–24	13–15
e-Milwaukee Bucks	41	41	.500	9	25–16	16–25	17–11
e-Atlanta Hawks	33	49	.402	17	23–18	10–31	11–17
e-Cleveland Cavaliers	29	53	.354	21	20–21	9–32	12–16
e-Chicago Bulls	21	61	.256	29	14–27	7–34	5–23

#	Eastern Conference				
#	Team	W	L	PCT	GB
1	c-New Jersey Nets	52	30	.634	–
2	y-Detroit Pistons	50	32	.610	2
3	x-Boston Celtics	49	33	.598	3
4	x-Charlotte Hornets	44	38	.537	8
5	x-Orlando Magic	44	38	.537	8
6	x-Philadelphia 76ers	43	39	.524	9
7	x-Toronto Raptors	42	40	.512	10
8	x-Indiana Pacers	42	40	.512	10
9	e-Milwaukee Bucks	41	41	.500	11
10	e-Washington Wizards	37	45	.451	15
11	e-Miami Heat	36	46	.439	16
12	e-Atlanta Hawks	33	49	.402	19
13	e-New York Knicks	30	52	.366	22
14	e-Cleveland Cavaliers	29	53	.354	23
15	e-Chicago Bulls	21	61	.256	31

== Player statistics ==
Legend
GP	Games played	GS	Games started	MPG	Minutes per game
FG%	Field-goal percentage	3P%	3-point field-goal percentage	FT%	Free-throw percentage
RPG	Rebounds per game	APG	Assists per game	SPG	Steals per game
BPG	Blocks per game	PPG	Points per game

=== Regular season ===
Player	GP	GS	MPG	FG%	3P%	FT%	RPG	APG	SPG	BPG	PPG
Greg Anthony^{†}	36	35	26.7	.394	.322	.671	2.4	5.6	1.4	.1	8.4
Ron Artest^{†}	27	26	30.5	.433	.396	.628	4.9	2.9	2.8	.9	15.6
Dalibor Bagarić	50	0	12.8	.404	.000	.586	3.2	.5	.3	.5	3.7
Travis Best^{†}	30	18	26.4	.441	.320	.922	2.7	5.0	1.1	.0	9.3
Tyson Chandler	71	31	19.6	.497		.604	4.8	.8	.4	1.3	6.1
Jamal Crawford	23	6	20.9	.476	.448	.769	1.5	2.4	.8	.2	9.3
Eddy Curry	72	31	16.0	.501		.656	3.8	.3	.2	.7	6.7
Marcus Fizer	76	20	25.8	.438	.171	.668	5.6	1.6	.6	.3	12.3
A. J. Guyton	45	6	13.5	.361	.374	.815	1.0	1.8	.2	.2	5.4
Trenton Hassell	78	47	28.7	.425	.364	.763	3.3	2.2	.7	.6	8.7
Fred Hoiberg	79	8	17.8	.416	.261	.840	2.7	1.7	.8	.1	4.4
Ron Mercer^{†}	40	40	37.6	.399	.298	.778	3.9	3.0	.8	.3	16.8
Brad Miller^{†}	48	47	29.0	.460	.500	.751	8.4	2.1	1.1	.6	12.7
Charles Oakley	57	36	24.3	.369	.167	.750	6.0	2.0	.9	.2	3.8
Kevin Ollie^{†}	52	17	22.0	.383	.500	.838	2.5	3.7	.7	.0	5.8
Norman Richardson^{†}	8	0	7.9	.435	.500	.667	.9	.1	.0	.0	3.8
Eddie Robinson	29	12	22.5	.453	.400	.750	2.7	1.3	.8	.4	9.0
Jalen Rose^{†}	30	30	40.5	.470	.370	.839	4.1	5.3	1.1	.5	23.8

- ^{†} Denotes player spent time with another team in the season. Stats reflect time with the Bulls only.

Player statistics citation:

== Transactions ==
=== Trades ===
February 19, 2002	To Indiana Pacers Kevin Ollie	To Chicago Bulls Travis Best
February 19, 2002	To Indiana Pacers Ron Artest, Brad Miller and Ron Mercer	To Chicago Bulls Jalen Rose, Norm Richardson, and a second-round draft pick

=== Subtractions ===
March 1, 2002
Player	Reason left	New team
Greg Anthony	Waived	Milwaukee Bucks

Player Transactions Citation:

== See also ==
- 2001–02 NBA season
