= 2001–02 Cleveland Cavaliers season =

NBA professional basketball team season

- Head coach: John Lucas
- Arena: Gund Arena

Results
- Record: 29–53 (.354)
- Place: Division: 7th (Central); Conference: 14th (Eastern)
- Playoff finish: Did not qualify

Local media
- Television: Fox Sports Net Ohio · WUAB
- Radio: WTAM

The 2001–02 Cleveland Cavaliers season was the 32nd season for the Cleveland Cavaliers in the National Basketball Association.

== Season summary ==
=== Off-season ===
The Cavaliers received the eighth overall pick in the 2001 NBA draft, and selected high school center DeSagana Diop. During the off-season, the team re-acquired former Cavaliers forward Tyrone Hill, and Jumaine Jones from the Philadelphia 76ers, acquired Ricky Davis from the Miami Heat in a three-team trade, acquired Michael Doleac from the Orlando Magic on draft day, acquired Brian Skinner from the Toronto Raptors, and signed free agent Bryant Stith. The Cavaliers also hired John Lucas as their new head coach.

=== Regular season ===
Under Lucas and with the addition of Hill, Davis and Jones, the Cavaliers got off to a horrible start by losing nine of their first eleven games of the regular season, then suffered a 12-game losing streak in January. Hill only played just 26 games due to sore back spasms, and Diop failed to live up to expectations only playing just 18 games due to knee, ankle and foot injuries. The Cavaliers lost 50 games for the third consecutive season, finishing in seventh place in the Central Division with a 29–53 record.

Lamond Murray averaged 16.6 points and 5.2 rebounds per game, and contributed 101 three-point field goals, while Andre Miller averaged 16.5 points, 10.9 assists and 1.6 steals per game, and Wesley Person provided the team with 15.1 points per game, and also led them with 143 three-point field goals. In addition, Davis contributed 11.7 points per game off the bench, while Zydrunas Ilgauskas averaged 11.1 points, 5.4 rebounds and 1.4 blocks per game, Jones provided with 8.3 points and 6.0 rebounds, and second-year center Chris Mihm contributed 7.7 points, 5.3 rebounds and 1.2 blocks per game. Meanwhile, Hill averaged 8.0 points and 10.5 rebounds per game, Doleac provided with 4.6 points and 4.3 rebounds per game, and Skinner contributed 3.4 points and 4.3 rebounds per game.

During the NBA All-Star weekend at the First Union Center in Philadelphia, Pennsylvania, Person participated in the NBA Three-Point Shootout, while Mihm was selected for the NBA Rookie Challenge Game, as a member of the Sophomores team. Miller finished tied in ninth place in Most Improved Player voting, while Person and Davis both finished tied in 16th place; Davis also finished tied in eighth place in Sixth Man of the Year voting.

The Cavaliers finished 23rd in the NBA in home-game attendance, with an attendance of 596,115 at the Gund Arena during the regular season.

=== Aftermath ===
Following the season, Murray was traded to the Toronto Raptors, while Miller and Stith were both traded to the Los Angeles Clippers, and Person was dealt to the Memphis Grizzlies on draft day.

== Draft picks ==
Round	Pick	Player	Position	Nationality	College / Club Team
1	8	Desagana Diop	Center	Senegal	
1	20^{*}	Brendan Haywood (traded to Orlando)	Center	United States	North Carolina
2	36	Jeff Trepagnier	Guard	United States	Southern California

^{*}1st round pick acquired from Miami in Shawn Kemp three-way deal with Portland. Haywood traded to Orlando in Michael Doleac deal.

== Roster ==
2001–02 Cleveland Cavaliers roster
Players

Pos.	No.	Player	Height	Weight	DOB	From
G/F	31	Ricky Davis	6 ft 7 in (2.01 m)	195 lb (88 kg)		Iowa
C	52	DeSagana Diop (injured)	7 ft 0 in (2.13 m)	280 lb (127 kg)		Oak Hill Academy HS (VA)
C	51	Michael Doleac	6 ft 11 in (2.11 m)	262 lb (119 kg)		Utah
F/C	32	Tyrone Hill	6 ft 9 in (2.06 m)	240 lb (109 kg)		Xavier
C	11	Zydrunas Ilgauskas	7 ft 3 in (2.21 m)	238 lb (108 kg)		Lithuania
F	33	Jumaine Jones	6 ft 8 in (2.03 m)	230 lb (104 kg)		Georgia
G	21	Trajan Langdon (injured)	6 ft 3 in (1.91 m)	210 lb (95 kg)		Duke
C	4	Chris Mihm	7 ft 0 in (2.13 m)	265 lb (120 kg)		Texas
G	24	Andre Miller	6 ft 2 in (1.88 m)	200 lb (91 kg)		Utah
F	30	Lamond Murray	6 ft 7 in (2.01 m)	236 lb (107 kg)		California
G	1	Wesley Person	6 ft 6 in (1.98 m)	195 lb (88 kg)		Auburn
F/C	8	Brian Skinner	6 ft 9 in (2.06 m)	255 lb (116 kg)		Baylor
G	20	Bryant Stith	6 ft 5 in (1.96 m)	208 lb (94 kg)		Virginia
G	3	Jeff Trepagnier (injured)	6 ft 4 in (1.93 m)	200 lb (91 kg)		USC

Coaches
Head coach
- John Lucas
Assistant(s)
- Jerry Eaves
- Ron Ekker
- Keith Smart

Legend
- (DP) Unsigned draft pick
- (FA) Free agent
- (S) Suspended
- Injured

Roster

== Regular season ==
=== Season standings ===
Central Division	W	L	PCT	GB	Home	Road	Div
y-Detroit Pistons	50	32	.610	–	26–15	24–17	20–8
x-Charlotte Hornets	44	38	.537	6	21–20	23–18	17–11
x-Toronto Raptors	42	40	.512	8	24–17	18–23	17–11
x-Indiana Pacers	42	40	.512	8	25–16	17–24	13–15
e-Milwaukee Bucks	41	41	.500	9	25–16	16–25	17–11
e-Atlanta Hawks	33	49	.402	17	23–18	10–31	11–17
e-Cleveland Cavaliers	29	53	.354	21	20–21	9–32	12–16
e-Chicago Bulls	21	61	.256	29	14–27	7–34	5–23

#	Eastern Conference				
#	Team	W	L	PCT	GB
1	c-New Jersey Nets	52	30	.634	–
2	y-Detroit Pistons	50	32	.610	2
3	x-Boston Celtics	49	33	.598	3
4	x-Charlotte Hornets	44	38	.537	8
5	x-Orlando Magic	44	38	.537	8
6	x-Philadelphia 76ers	43	39	.524	9
7	x-Toronto Raptors	42	40	.512	10
8	x-Indiana Pacers	42	40	.512	10
9	e-Milwaukee Bucks	41	41	.500	11
10	e-Washington Wizards	37	45	.451	15
11	e-Miami Heat	36	46	.439	16
12	e-Atlanta Hawks	33	49	.402	19
13	e-New York Knicks	30	52	.366	22
14	e-Cleveland Cavaliers	29	53	.354	23
15	e-Chicago Bulls	21	61	.256	31

== Game log ==
2001–02 game log
Total: 29–53 (Home: 20–21; Road: 9–32)
October: 0–2 (home: 0–1; road: 0–1)

Game	Date	Team	Score	High points	High rebounds	High assists	Location Attendance	Record

November: 5–9 (home: 3–4; road: 2–5)

Game	Date	Team	Score	High points	High rebounds	High assists	Location Attendance	Record
16	November 29, 2001	Atlanta	L 96–105				Gund Arena; 11,201	5–11

December: 7–7 (home: 5–3; road: 2–4)

Game	Date	Team	Score	High points	High rebounds	High assists	Location Attendance	Record

January: 2–13 (home: 2–4; road: 0–9)

Game	Date	Team	Score	High points	High rebounds	High assists	Location Attendance	Record

February: 7–5 (home: 4–4; road: 3–1)

Game	Date	Team	Score	High points	High rebounds	High assists	Location Attendance	Record

March: 4–12 (home: 3–4; road: 1–8)

Game	Date	Team	Score	High points	High rebounds	High assists	Location Attendance	Record
58	March 2, 2002	@ Atlanta	L 81–84				Philips Arena; 15,878	21–37
60	March 5, 2002	Atlanta	W 103–96				Gund Arena; 9,915	22–38

April: 4–5 (home: 3–1; road: 1–4)

Game	Date	Team	Score	High points	High rebounds	High assists	Location Attendance	Record
80	April 13, 2002	@ Atlanta	L 123–128 (2 OT)				Philips Arena; 15,282	29–51

2001–02 schedule

== Player stats ==
Legend
GP	Games played	GS	Games started	MPG	Minutes per game
FG%	Field-goal percentage	3P%	3-point field-goal percentage	FT%	Free-throw percentage
RPG	Rebounds per game	APG	Assists per game	SPG	Steals per game
BPG	Blocks per game	PPG	Points per game

=== Regular season ===
Player	GP	GS	MPG	FG%	3P%	FT%	RPG	APG	SPG	BPG	PPG
Lamond Murray	71	68	32.6	43.6	42.4	81.7	5.2	2.2	1.0	0.6	16.6
Andre Miller	81	81	37.3	45.4	25.3	81.7	4.7	10.9	1.6	0.4	16.5
Wesley Person	78	78	35.8	49.5	44.4	79.8	3.8	2.2	1.0	0.5	15.1
Ricky Davis	82	8	23.8	48.1	31.4	79.0	3.0	2.2	0.8	0.3	11.7
Zydrunas Ilgauskas	62	23	21.4	42.5	0.0	75.4	5.4	1.1	0.3	1.4	11.1
Jumaine Jones	81	36	26.4	44.8	31.0	66.2	6.0	1.4	0.9	0.6	8.3
Tyrone Hill	26	26	31.2	39.0	0.0	65.0	10.5	0.9	0.7	0.5	8.0
Chris Mihm	74	60	22.4	42.0	42.9	69.3	5.3	0.3	0.2	1.2	7.7
Trajan Langdon	44	0	10.8	39.8	36.5	91.3	1.3	1.4	0.3	0.1	4.8
Michael Doleac	42	15	16.8	41.7	0.0	82.6	4.0	0.6	0.4	0.3	4.6
Bryant Stith	50	5	13.3	37.2	35.3	84.6	1.7	0.8	0.6	0.1	4.2
Brian Skinner	65	8	17.0	54.3	0.0	60.8	4.3	0.3	0.4	0.9	3.4
Bimbo Coles	47	1	14.7	38.4	20.0	89.2	1.2	2.3	0.3	0.1	3.2
Jeff Trepagnier	12	0	6.4	30.4	0.0	57.1	1.0	1.0	0.7	0.3	1.5
DeSagana Diop	18	1	6.1	41.4	0.0	20.0	0.9	0.3	0.1	0.6	1.4

Player statistics citation:
