= 2001–02 Toronto Raptors season =

NBA professional basketball team season

- Head coach: Lenny Wilkens
- General manager: Glen Grunwald
- Owners: Maple Leaf Sports & Entertainment
- Arena: Air Canada Centre

Results
- Record: 42–40 (.512)
- Place: Division: 3rd (Central); Conference: 7th (Eastern)
- Playoff finish: First round (lost to Pistons 2–3)
- Stats at Basketball Reference

Local media
- Television: Rogers Sportsnet; Raptors NBA TV; TSN; The Score
- Radio: CJCL

The 2001–02 Toronto Raptors season was the seventh season for the Toronto Raptors in the National Basketball Association.

== Season summary ==
=== Off-season ===
During the off-season, the Raptors acquired All-Star center, and 2-time NBA Champion Hakeem Olajuwon from the Houston Rockets.

=== Regular season ===
With the addition of Olajuwon, the Raptors played solid basketball with a 29–21 record at the All-Star break. However, throughout the regular season, All-Star guard and team captain Vince Carter struggled with a left knee injury, and managed to play only 60 games. The team suffered a 13-game losing streak between February and March, losing 17 of their next 18 games, but soon recovered by posting a nine-game winning streak between March and April, winning 12 of their final 14 games of the season. Despite losing Carter for the remainder of the season, the Raptors finished in third place in the Central Division with a 42–40 record, and earned the seventh seed in the Eastern Conference.

Carter averaged 24.7 points, 5.2 rebounds, 4.0 assists and 1.5 steals per game, and led the Raptors with 121 three-point field goals, while Antonio Davis averaged 14.5 points, 9.6 rebounds and 1.1 blocks per game, and second-year forward Morris Peterson showed improvement, as he provided the team with 14.0 points per game. In addition, Alvin Williams contributed 11.8 points, 5.7 assists and 1.6 steals per game, while Keon Clark provided with 11.3 points, 7.4 rebounds and 1.5 blocks per game, and Olajuwon averaged 7.1 points, 6.0 rebounds and 1.5 blocks per game. Meanwhile, three-point specialist Dell Curry contributed 6.4 points per game, and Chris Childs provided with 4.1 points and 5.1 assists per game.

During the NBA All-Star weekend at the First Union Center in Philadelphia, Pennsylvania, Carter was selected for the 2002 NBA All-Star Game, as a member of the Eastern Conference All-Star team, but did not participate due to his knee injury. Meanwhile, Peterson was selected for the NBA Rookie Challenge Game, as a member of the Sophomores team, but did not participate due to injury. The Raptors finished fifth in the NBA in home-game attendance, with an attendance of 810,160 at the Air Canada Centre during the regular season.

=== NBA playoffs ===
In the Eastern Conference First Round of the 2002 NBA playoffs, the Raptors faced off against the 2nd–seeded, and Central Division champion Detroit Pistons, who were led by All-Star guard Jerry Stackhouse, Clifford Robinson, and Defensive Player of the Year, Ben Wallace. However, without Carter due to his season-ending knee injury, the Raptors lost the first two games to the Pistons on the road; the team struggled in Game 1 at The Palace of Auburn Hills, losing to the Pistons by a score of 85–63, only shooting .299 in field-goal percentage. The Raptors managed to win the next two games at home, which included a Game 4 win over the Pistons at the Air Canada Centre, 89–83 to tie the series at 2–2. However, the Raptors lost Game 5 to the Pistons at The Palace of Auburn Hills, 85–82, thus losing in a hard-fought five-game series.

=== Aftermath ===
Following the season, Olajuwon retired after eighteen seasons in the NBA. Meanwhile, Childs re-signed as a free agent with his former team, the New Jersey Nets, while Clark signed with the Sacramento Kings, Tracy Murray was traded to the Los Angeles Lakers on draft day, and Curry also retired.

The Raptors would not return to the NBA playoffs again until the 2006–07 season.

== NBA draft ==
Round	Pick	Player	Position	Nationality	College
1	17	Michael Bradley	Power Forward	United States	Villanova

== Roster ==
2001–02 Toronto Raptors roster
Players

Pos.	No.	Player	Height	Weight	DOB	From
F	5	Michael Bradley	6 ft 10 in (2.08 m)	245 lb (111 kg)	1979–04–18	Villanova
G/F	15	Vince Carter	6 ft 6 in (1.98 m)	220 lb (100 kg)	1977–01–26	North Carolina
G	1	Chris Childs	6 ft 3 in (1.91 m)	195 lb (88 kg)	1967–11–20	Boise State
F/C	7	Keon Clark	6 ft 11 in (2.11 m)	220 lb (100 kg)	1975–04–16	UNLV
G	30	Dell Curry	6 ft 4 in (1.93 m)	190 lb (86 kg)	1964–06–25	Virginia Tech
F/C	33	Antonio Davis	6 ft 9 in (2.06 m)	215 lb (98 kg)	1968–10–31	UTEP
G	44	Derrick Dial	6 ft 4 in (1.93 m)	184 lb (83 kg)	1975–12–20	Eastern Michigan
G	8	Jermaine Jackson	6 ft 4 in (1.93 m)	204 lb (93 kg)	1976–06–07	Detroit Mercy
C	00	Eric Montross	7 ft 0 in (2.13 m)	270 lb (122 kg)	1971–09–23	North Carolina
G/F	35	Tracy Murray	6 ft 7 in (2.01 m)	225 lb (102 kg)	1971–07–25	UCLA
C	32	Mamadou N'Diaye	7 ft 0 in (2.13 m)	255 lb (116 kg)	1975–06–16	Auburn
C	34	Hakeem Olajuwon	7 ft 0 in (2.13 m)	255 lb (116 kg)	1963–01–21	Houston
G/F	24	Morris Peterson	6 ft 7 in (2.01 m)	220 lb (100 kg)	1977–08–26	Michigan State
C	4	Michael Stewart	6 ft 10 in (2.08 m)	230 lb (104 kg)	1975–04–25	California
G	20	Alvin Williams	6 ft 5 in (1.96 m)	185 lb (84 kg)	1974–08–06	Villanova
F	13	Jerome Williams	6 ft 9 in (2.06 m)	206 lb (93 kg)	1973–05–10	Georgetown

Coaches
Head coach
- Lenny Wilkens
Assistant(s)
- Stan Albeck
- Jim Brewer
- Craig Neal

Legend
- (DP) Unsigned draft pick
- (FA) Free agent
- (S) Suspended
- Injured

Roster
Updated: March 28, 2002

== Regular season ==
=== Standings ===
Central Division	W	L	PCT	GB	Home	Road	Div
y-Detroit Pistons	50	32	.610	–	26–15	24–17	20–8
x-Charlotte Hornets	44	38	.537	6	21–20	23–18	17–11
x-Toronto Raptors	42	40	.512	8	24–17	18–23	17–11
x-Indiana Pacers	42	40	.512	8	25–16	17–24	13–15
e-Milwaukee Bucks	41	41	.500	9	25–16	16–25	17–11
e-Atlanta Hawks	33	49	.402	17	23–18	10–31	11–17
e-Cleveland Cavaliers	29	53	.354	21	20–21	9–32	12–16
e-Chicago Bulls	21	61	.256	29	14–27	7–34	5–23

#	Eastern Conference				
#	Team	W	L	PCT	GB
1	c-New Jersey Nets	52	30	.634	–
2	y-Detroit Pistons	50	32	.610	2
3	x-Boston Celtics	49	33	.598	3
4	x-Charlotte Hornets	44	38	.537	8
5	x-Orlando Magic	44	38	.537	8
6	x-Philadelphia 76ers	43	39	.524	9
7	x-Toronto Raptors	42	40	.512	10
8	x-Indiana Pacers	42	40	.512	10
9	e-Milwaukee Bucks	41	41	.500	11
10	e-Washington Wizards	37	45	.451	15
11	e-Miami Heat	36	46	.439	16
12	e-Atlanta Hawks	33	49	.402	19
13	e-New York Knicks	30	52	.366	22
14	e-Cleveland Cavaliers	29	53	.354	23
15	e-Chicago Bulls	21	61	.256	31

=== Game log ===
2001–02 game log
October: 0–2 (home: 0–0; road: 0–2)

Game	Date	Team	Score	High points	High rebounds	High assists	Location Attendance	Record
1	October 30	@ Orlando	L 85–114	Chris Childs (13)	Antonio Davis (10)	Vince Carter, Chris Childs (3)	TD Waterhouse Centre; 16,088	0–1
2	October 31	@ Miami	L 92–97	Vince Carter (20)	Antonio Davis (15)	Vince Carter (7)	American Airlines Arena; 16,500	0–2

November: 10–4 (home: 5–2; road: 5–2)

Game	Date	Team	Score	High points	High rebounds	High assists	Location Attendance	Record
3	November 2	Dallas	W 109–92	Vince Carter (25)	Antonio Davis, Hakeem Olajuwon (8)	Morris Peterson, Alvin Williams (8)	Air Canada Centre; 19,800	1–2
4	November 4	Indiana	W 113–100	Vince Carter (28)	Hakeem Olajuwon (8)	Chris Childs (9)	Air Canada Centre; 18,825	2–2
5	November 7	Golden State	W 109–92	Vince Carter (39)	Antonio Davis (16)	Vince Carter (6)	Air Canada Centre; 18,887	3–2
6	November 10	@ Utah	W 117–96	Vince Carter (43)	Jerome Williams (9)	Alvin Williams (12)	Delta Center; 18,194	4–2
7	November 11	@ Denver	L 85–96	Vince Carter (22)	Antonio Davis (11)	Alvin Williams (7)	Pepsi Center; 13,735	4–3
8	November 13	@ Sacramento	L 86–95	Vince Carter (23)	Keon Clark (10)	Alvin Williams (5)	ARCO Arena; 17,317	4–4
9	November 14	@ Golden State	W 89–82	Vince Carter (24)	Keon Clark (9)	Vince Carter, Alvin Williams (5)	The Arena in Oakland; 18,269	5–4
10	November 16	@ L.A. Clippers	W 94–85	Vince Carter (29)	Hakeem Olajuwon (12)	Alvin Williams (9)	Staples Center; 18,964	6–4
11	November 18	@ Phoenix	W 87–81	Vince Carter (31)	Hakeem Olajuwon (12)	Alvin Williams (7)	America West Arena; 14,823	7–4
12	November 20	Detroit	L 84–88	Vince Carter (28)	Hakeem Olajuwon (20)	Chris Childs (5)	Air Canada Centre; 19,800	7–5
13	November 22	Milwaukee	L 75–78	Vince Carter (26)	Antonio Davis (11)	Alvin Williams (7)	Air Canada Centre; 19,800	7–6
14	November 23	@ Boston	W 91–89	Keon Clark (19)	Keon Clark (9)	Vince Carter (6)	FleetCenter; 18,624	8–6
15	November 25	Philadelphia	W 107–88	Vince Carter (30)	Keon Clark, Antonio Davis (10)	Alvin Williams (7)	Air Canada Centre; 19,800	9–6
16	November 29	Memphis	W 91–88	Vince Carter (23)	Antonio Davis (11)	Vince Carter, Alvin Williams (7)	Air Canada Centre; 19,800	10–6

December: 6–8 (home: 3–3; road: 3–5)

Game	Date	Team	Score	High points	High rebounds	High assists	Location Attendance	Record
17	December 1	@ Atlanta	W 104–103	Vince Carter (19)	Vince Carter, Keon Clark (10)	Alvin Williams (9)	Philips Arena; 18,628	11–6
18	December 2	Boston	L 69–85	Vince Carter (17)	Antonio Davis (12)	Vince Carter (6)	Air Canada Centre; 19,800	11–7
19	December 6	@ Milwaukee	L 89–95	Vince Carter (26)	Hakeem Olajuwon (14)	Vince Carter (7)	Bradley Center; 18,717	11–8
20	December 7	Denver	W 98–96 (OT)	Vince Carter (42)	Vince Carter (15)	Chris Childs, Alvin Williams (7)	Air Canada Centre; 19,800	12–8
21	December 9	Phoenix	L 90–91	Vince Carter (42)	Keon Clark (15)	Chris Childs (7)	Air Canada Centre; 19,800	12–9
22	December 12	@ San Antonio	L 95–108	Alvin Williams (16)	Hakeem Olajuwon, Morris Peterson (6)	Alvin Williams (7)	Alamodome; 16,650	12–10
23	December 13	@ Charlotte	L 90–104	Vince Carter (31)	Keon Clark (9)	Alvin Williams (7)	Charlotte Coliseum; 9,791	12–11
24	December 16	Washington	L 88–93	Vince Carter (23)	Antonio Davis (14)	Alvin Williams (8)	Air Canada Centre; 20,048	12–12
25	December 19	@ Indiana	W 102–90	Morris Peterson (29)	Keon Clark (11)	Vince Carter, Alvin Williams (6)	Conseco Fieldhouse; 16,060	13–12
26	December 20	Chicago	W 96–91	Vince Carter (33)	Antonio Davis, Jerome Williams (11)	Vince Carter (7)	Air Canada Centre; 19,800	14–12
27	December 23	Miami	W 83–76	Vince Carter (27)	Vince Carter, Antonio Davis (10)	Alvin Williams (7)	Air Canada Centre; 19,800	15–12
28	December 25	@ New York	L 94–102	Morris Peterson (22)	Antonio Davis (11)	Alvin Williams (5)	Madison Square Garden; 19,763	15–13
29	December 28	@ L.A. Lakers	W 89–86	Alvin Williams (17)	Keon Clark (16)	Alvin Williams (8)	Staples Center; 18,997	16–13
30	December 29	@ Seattle	L 75–101	Morris Peterson (18)	Keon Clark (11)	Alvin Williams (5)	KeyArena; 17,072	16–14

January: 11–5 (home: 7–3; road: 4–2)

Game	Date	Team	Score	High points	High rebounds	High assists	Location Attendance	Record
31	January 2	@ Portland	W 95–84	Vince Carter (28)	Keon Clark, Antonio Davis (9)	Chris Childs (9)	Rose Garden; 18,117	17–14
32	January 4	Cleveland	W 101–91	Vince Carter (34)	Keon Clark (11)	Vince Carter (8)	Air Canada Centre; 19,800	18–14
33	January 6	L.A. Lakers	L 89–109	Vince Carter (24)	Eric Montross (8)	Alvin Williams (6)	Air Canada Centre; 19,800	18–15
34	January 8	@ Memphis	L 81–84	Vince Carter (31)	Antonio Davis (10)	Chris Childs, Alvin Williams (6)	Pyramid Arena; 14,323	18–16
35	January 9	@ Chicago	W 85–73	Vince Carter (19)	Antonio Davis (12)	Chris Childs (10)	United Center; 16,227	19–16
36	January 11	Atlanta	W 94–91 (OT)	Alvin Williams (28)	Antonio Davis (13)	Vince Carter (8)	Air Canada Centre; 19,800	20–16
37	January 13	L.A. Clippers	L 72–79	Vince Carter (31)	Antonio Davis (17)	Alvin Williams (4)	Air Canada Centre; 19,800	20–17
38	January 15	@ Detroit	W 92–90	Vince Carter (24)	Vince Carter, Antonio Davis (9)	Chris Childs (9)	The Palace of Auburn Hills; 17,045	21–17
39	January 16	Houston	W 109–103	Vince Carter (29)	Jerome Williams (8)	Alvin Williams (6)	Air Canada Centre; 19,800	22–17
40	January 18	New Jersey	W 89–77	Vince Carter (23)	Keon Clark (13)	Alvin Williams (7)	Air Canada Centre; 19,800	23–17
41	January 19	@ Charlotte	W 91–89	Vince Carter (34)	Jerome Williams (10)	Antonio Davis, Alvin Williams (5)	Charlotte Coliseum; 16,593	24–17
42	January 21	@ Boston	L 97–106	Vince Carter (26)	Hakeem Olajuwon (10)	Chris Childs (8)	FleetCenter; 16,380	24–18
43	January 23	New York	L 92–96	Alvin Williams (23)	Antonio Davis (17)	Chris Childs (7)	Air Canada Centre; 19,800	24–19
44	January 25	Minnesota	W 107–100	Vince Carter (19)	Jerome Williams (13)	Alvin Williams (7)	Air Canada Centre; 19,800	25–19
45	January 27	Orlando	W 106–97	Vince Carter (32)	Antonio Davis (10)	Chris Childs (9)	Air Canada Centre; 19,800	26–19
46	January 31	Boston	W 97–92	Vince Carter (27)	Antonio Davis (13)	Chris Childs (9)	Air Canada Centre; 19,800	27–19

February: 2–11 (home: 1–6; road: 1–5)

Game	Date	Team	Score	High points	High rebounds	High assists	Location Attendance	Record
47	February 2	@ New Jersey	L 91–98	Vince Carter (26)	Antonio Davis (12)	Chris Childs (5)	Continental Airlines Arena; 20,049	27–20
48	February 4	@ Philadelphia	W 100–93	Vince Carter (28)	Antonio Davis (9)	Vince Carter (6)	First Union Center; 20,512	28–20
49	February 5	@ Washington	L 94–99	Vince Carter (29)	Antonio Davis (8)	Chris Childs (11)	MCI Center; 20,674	28–21
50	February 7	San Antonio	W 80–74 (OT)	Keon Clark (17)	Keon Clark, Eric Montross (12)	Alvin Williams (9)	Air Canada Centre; 19,800	29–21
51	February 12	@ Cleveland	L 81–99	Keon Clark (18)	Eric Montross (12)	Chris Childs (7)	Gund Arena; 15,589	29–22
52	February 13	@ New York	L 82–89	Keon Clark (26)	Keon Clark (15)	Alvin Williams (8)	Madison Square Garden; 19,763	29–23
53	February 15	Utah	L 85–94	Alvin Williams (26)	Antonio Davis (8)	Alvin Williams (7)	Air Canada Centre; 19,800	29–24
54	February 17	Milwaukee	L 86–91	Alvin Williams (24)	Antonio Davis (17)	Chris Childs (6)	Air Canada Centre; 19,800	29–25
55	February 18	@ Detroit	L 76–89	Antonio Davis (21)	Antonio Davis (14)	Chris Childs, Alvin Williams (5)	The Palace of Auburn Hills; 18,491	29–26
56	February 20	Charlotte	L 77–78	Antonio Davis (29)	Antonio Davis (14)	Alvin Williams (4)	Air Canada Centre; 19,800	29–27
57	February 22	Detroit	L 72–80	Antonio Davis (17)	Antonio Davis (13)	Alvin Williams (8)	Air Canada Centre; 19,800	29–28
58	February 24	Seattle	L 92–101	Vince Carter (28)	Antonio Davis (12)	Alvin Williams (14)	Air Canada Centre; 19,800	29–29
59	February 27	Orlando	L 85–90	Vince Carter (22)	Antonio Davis (10)	Alvin Williams (8)	Air Canada Centre; 19,800	29–30

March: 6–8 (home: 2–3; road: 4–5)

Game	Date	Team	Score	High points	High rebounds	High assists	Location Attendance	Record
60	March 1	Portland	L 81–91	Vince Carter (25)	Antonio Davis, Hakeem Olajuwon (8)	Chris Childs (7)	Air Canada Centre; 19,800	29–31
61	March 3	Philadelphia	L 84–96	Antonio Davis (26)	Antonio Davis (9)	Alvin Williams (6)	Air Canada Centre; 19,800	29–32
62	March 5	@ Houston	L 109–112	Vince Carter (43)	Vince Carter, Hakeem Olajuwon (7)	Alvin Williams (9)	Compaq Center; 14,221	29–33
63	March 7	@ Dallas	L 103–122	Vince Carter (19)	Keon Clark, Antonio Davis (15)	Alvin Williams (7)	American Airlines Center; 19,945	29–34
64	March 8	@ Miami	W 83–74	Antonio Davis (23)	Antonio Davis (10)	Chris Childs (6)	American Airlines Arena; 16,500	30–34
65	March 10	@ Orlando	L 79–92	Vince Carter (16)	Antonio Davis (12)	Chris Childs (7)	TD Waterhouse Centre; 16,171	30–35
66	March 12	@ New Jersey	L 84–86	Antonio Davis (27)	Antonio Davis, Jerome Williams (13)	Vince Carter (4)	Continental Airlines Arena; 16,105	30–36
67	March 17	Sacramento	L 113–116	Vince Carter (22)	Hakeem Olajuwon (13)	Chris Childs (7)	Air Canada Centre; 19,800	30–37
68	March 19	@ Minnesota	L 80–112	Morris Peterson (19)	Antonio Davis (13)	Alvin Williams (7)	Target Center; 17,010	30–38
69	March 22	@ Cleveland	W 94–80	Morris Peterson (18)	Keon Clark (10)	Alvin Williams (4)	Gund Arena; 17,847	31–38
70	March 24	Washington	W 92–91	Morris Peterson (26)	Antonio Davis (9)	Alvin Williams (9)	Air Canada Centre; 19,800	32–38
71	March 27	Miami	W 81–80	Morris Peterson (21)	Antonio Davis, Jerome Williams (10)	Chris Childs (6)	Air Canada Centre; 19,800	33–38
72	March 28	@ Atlanta	W 85–83	Antonio Davis, Morris Peterson (15)	Antonio Davis (9)	Chris Childs (7)	Philips Arena; 12,036	34–38
73	March 31	@ Philadelphia	W 72–70	Antonio Davis (16)	Jerome Williams (9)	Chris Childs (9)	First Union Center; 20,650	35–38

April: 7–2 (home: 6–0; road: 1–2)

Game	Date	Team	Score	High points	High rebounds	High assists	Location Attendance	Record
74	April 3	Chicago	W 117–104	Morris Peterson (26)	Antonio Davis (13)	Alvin Williams (10)	Air Canada Centre; 19,800	36–38
75	April 5	@ Chicago	W 98–96	Antonio Davis (27)	Keon Clark (10)	Chris Childs (8)	United Center; 19,352	37–38
76	April 7	Indiana	W 94–84	Alvin Williams (26)	Antonio Davis (10)	Chris Childs (8)	Air Canada Centre; 19,800	38–38
77	April 9	Charlotte	W 84–80	Antonio Davis (24)	Jerome Williams (8)	Antonio Davis, Morris Peterson (7)	Air Canada Centre; 19,800	39–38
78	April 10	@ Indiana	L 82–98	Antonio Davis (24)	Antonio Davis (9)	Alvin Williams (6)	Conseco Fieldhouse; 16,337	39–39
79	April 12	Atlanta	W 112–73	Keon Clark, Jerome Williams (20)	Michael Bradley, Keon Clark, Jerome Williams (6)	Jermaine Jackson (11)	Air Canada Centre; 19,800	40–39
80	April 14	New Jersey	W 101–82	Morris Peterson (24)	Keon Clark (9)	Jermaine Jackson (9)	Air Canada Centre; 19,800	41–39
81	April 16	@ Milwaukee	L 89–105	Morris Peterson (23)	Antonio Davis, Jerome Williams (6)	Chris Childs, Alvin Williams (5)	Bradley Center; 17,086	41–40
82	April 17	Cleveland	W 103–85	Morris Peterson, Jerome Williams (22)	Jerome Williams (12)	Alvin Williams (8)	Air Canada Centre; 19,800	42–40

2001–02 season schedule

== Playoffs ==
=== Game log ===
2002 playoff game log
First Round: 2–3 (home: 2–0; road: 0–3)

Game	Date	Team	Score	High points	High rebounds	High assists	Location Attendance	Record
1	April 21	@ Detroit	L 63–85	Antonio Davis (15)	Antonio Davis (14)	Alvin Williams (6)	The Palace of Auburn Hills; 22,076	0–1
2	April 24	@ Detroit	L 91–96	Chris Childs (22)	Antonio Davis (14)	Chris Childs (14)	The Palace of Auburn Hills; 22,076	0–2
3	April 27	Detroit	W 94–84	Antonio Davis (30)	Antonio Davis (8)	Chris Childs (10)	Air Canada Centre; 20,138	1–2
4	April 29	Detroit	W 89–83	Morris Peterson (20)	Keon Clark (16)	Alvin Williams (9)	Air Canada Centre; 20,112	2–2
5	May 2	@ Detroit	L 82–85	Dell Curry (17)	Antonio Davis (12)	Childs, Williams (6)	The Palace of Auburn Hills; 22,076	2–3

2002 schedule

== Player statistics ==
=== Regular season ===
Player	POS	GP	GS	MP	REB	AST	STL	BLK	PTS	MPG	RPG	APG	SPG	BPG	PPG
Alvin Williams	PG	82	82	2,927	281	468	135	26	971	35.7	3.4	5.7	1.6	.3	11.8
Keon Clark	C	81	31	2,185	603	88	58	122	915	27.0	7.4	1.1	.7	1.5	11.3
Antonio Davis	PF	77	77	2,978	740	155	54	83	1,113	38.7	9.6	2.0	.7	1.1	14.5
Chris Childs	PG	69	4	1,576	154	351	56	5	285	22.8	2.2	5.1	.8	.1	4.1
Jerome Williams	PF	68	32	1,641	386	75	78	25	518	24.1	5.7	1.1	1.1	.4	7.6
Morris Peterson	SF	63	56	1,988	223	153	73	11	883	31.6	3.5	2.4	1.2	.2	14.0
Hakeem Olajuwon	C	61	37	1,378	366	66	74	90	435	22.6	6.0	1.1	1.2	1.5	7.1
Vince Carter	SG	60	60	2,385	313	239	94	43	1,484	39.8	5.2	4.0	1.6	.7	24.7
Dell Curry	SG	56	4	886	81	61	22	6	360	15.8	1.4	1.1	.4	.1	6.4
Eric Montross	C	49	24	655	140	16	12	23	116	13.4	2.9	.3	.2	.5	2.4
Tracy Murray	SF	40	3	473	53	19	11	8	227	11.8	1.3	.5	.3	.2	5.7
Michael Bradley	PF	26	0	118	24	3	0	6	30	4.5	.9	.1	.0	.2	1.2
Jermaine Jackson	SG	24	0	280	27	57	9	1	57	11.7	1.1	2.4	.4	.0	2.4
Carlos Arroyo^{†}	PG	17	0	96	12	21	6	0	30	5.6	.7	1.2	.4	.0	1.8
Michael Stewart	C	11	0	93	25	3	4	3	22	8.5	2.3	.3	.4	.3	2.0
Derrick Dial^{†}	SG	7	0	50	11	4	2	0	28	7.1	1.6	.6	.3	.0	4.0
Mamadou N'Diaye	C	5	0	46	11	0	0	2	20	9.2	2.2	.0	.0	.4	4.0

- ^{†} Denotes player spent time with another team in the season. Stats reflect time with the Raptors only.

=== Playoffs ===
Player	POS	GP	GS	MP	REB	AST	STL	BLK	PTS	MPG	RPG	APG	SPG	BPG	PPG
Antonio Davis	PF	5	5	202	53	7	2	5	85	40.4	10.6	1.4	.4	1.0	17.0
Alvin Williams	PG	5	5	196	24	28	6	2	60	39.2	4.8	5.6	1.2	.4	12.0
Keon Clark	C	5	5	174	40	8	2	8	67	34.8	8.0	1.6	.4	1.6	13.4
Morris Peterson	SF	5	5	154	14	11	5	3	46	30.8	2.8	2.2	1.0	.6	9.2
Chris Childs	PG	5	4	163	19	37	4	0	59	32.6	3.8	7.4	.8	.0	11.8
Jerome Williams	PF	5	1	143	33	7	9	1	36	28.6	6.6	1.4	1.8	.2	7.2
Hakeem Olajuwon	C	5	0	86	19	2	7	4	28	17.2	3.8	.4	1.4	.8	5.6
Dell Curry	SG	4	0	59	5	4	5	2	28	14.8	1.3	1.0	1.3	.5	7.0
Jermaine Jackson	SG	4	0	12	1	0	0	0	6	3.0	.3	.0	.0	.0	1.5
Michael Stewart	C	1	0	8	3	0	0	1	4	8.0	3.0	.0	.0	1.0	4.0
Michael Bradley	PF	1	0	3	1	1	0	0	0	3.0	1.0	1.0	.0	.0	.0

== Award winners ==
- Vince Carter, NBA All-Star Game selection, Starter (did not play due to an injury)
- Morris Peterson, NBA Rookie-Sophomore All-Star Game selection [Sophomore] (did not play due to an injury)
