= 2001–02 Atlanta Hawks season =

NBA professional basketball team season

- Head coach: Lon Kruger
- Arena: Philips Arena

Results
- Record: 33–49 (.402)
- Place: Division: 6th (Central); Conference: 12th (Eastern)
- Playoff finish: Did not qualify
- Stats at Basketball Reference

Local media
- Television: WUPA; Fox Sports Net South; Turner South
- Radio: WCNN

The 2001–02 Atlanta Hawks season was the 53rd season for the Atlanta Hawks in the National Basketball Association, and their 34th season in Atlanta, Georgia.

== Season summary ==
=== Off-season ===
The Hawks received the third overall pick in the 2001 NBA draft, and selected power forward, and Spanish basketball star Pau Gasol; however, the team soon traded Gasol to the Memphis Grizzlies in exchange for Shareef Abdur-Rahim, and rookie point guard, and first-round draft pick Jamaal Tinsley out of Iowa State University on draft day. The Hawks traded Tinsley to the Indiana Pacers also on draft day. During the off-season, the team signed free agents Ira Newble, Jacque Vaughn and Emanual Davis; although Newble was released to free agency before the regular season began, he would later on be re-signed by the Hawks in January.

=== Regular season ===
With the addition of Abdur-Rahim and Vaughn, the Hawks struggled losing six of their first seven games of the regular season, and later on posted a 3–12 record in January, while posting two six-game losing streaks between January and February. Theo Ratliff only played just three games due to a right hip injury, and was replaced with Nazr Mohammed as the team's starting center. The Hawks dealt with injuries all season long, as Toni Kukoč only played 59 games due to a broken right wrist, while Davis was out for the remainder of the season after 28 games due to a broken left wrist, Dion Glover only appeared in 55 games due to a broken right foot, Alan Henderson only played just 26 games due to a right knee injury, and Chris Crawford only appeared in just seven games due to a left knee injury.

However, after holding a 16–33 record at the All-Star break, the Hawks played above .500 in winning percentage by posting a 17–16 record for the remainder of the season, which included a 93–90 road win over the 2-time defending NBA champion Los Angeles Lakers at the Staples Center on February 15, 2002, and posting a 9–7 record in March. The Hawks showed slight improvement by avoiding 50 losses, finishing in sixth place in the Central Division with a 33–49 record.

Abdur-Rahim averaged 21.2 points, 9.0 rebounds and 1.3 steals per game, while Jason Terry averaged 19.3 points, 5.7 assists and 1.8 steals per game, and led the Hawks with 172 three-point field goals, and Mohammed provided the team with 9.7 points and 7.9 rebounds per game. In addition, Kukoč averaged 9.9 points and 3.6 assists per game off the bench, while Glover provided with 8.9 points per game, second-year forward DerMarr Johnson contributed 8.4 points per game, Newble averaged 8.0 points and 5.3 rebounds per game, and Vaughn contributed 6.6 points and 4.3 assists per game. Meanwhile, Davis contributed 6.6 points per game, Henderson averaged 5.5 points and 3.7 rebounds per game, and second-year forward Hanno Möttölä provided with 4.8 points and 3.3 rebounds per game.

During the NBA All-Star weekend at the First Union Center in Philadelphia, Pennsylvania, Abdur-Rahim was selected for the 2002 NBA All-Star Game, as a member of the Eastern Conference All-Star team; it was his first and only All-Star appearance. Terry finished tied in 16th place in Most Improved Player voting, while Vaughn finished tied in eighth place in Sixth Man of the Year voting. The Hawks finished 27th in the NBA in home-game attendance, with an attendance of 506,110 at the Philips Arena during the regular season, which was the third-lowest in the league.

=== Aftermath ===
Following the season, Kukoč was traded to the Milwaukee Bucks, while Vaughn signed as a free agent with the Orlando Magic, and Möttölä was released to free agency.

== Offseason ==
=== Draft picks ===
Round	Pick	Player	Position	Nationality	College
1	3	Pau Gasol	PF/C	Spain	
2	33	Terence Morris	SF	United States	Maryland

== Roster ==
2001–02 Atlanta Hawks roster
Players

Pos.	No.	Player	Height	Weight	DOB	From
F	3	Shareef Abdur-Rahim	6 ft 9 in (2.06 m)	225 lb (102 kg)	1976–12–11	California
F	6	Cal Bowdler	6 ft 10 in (2.08 m)	245 lb (111 kg)	1977–03–31	Old Dominion
F	4	Chris Crawford (injured)	6 ft 9 in (2.06 m)	235 lb (107 kg)	1975–05–13	Marquette
G	15	Emanual Davis (injured)	6 ft 4 in (1.93 m)	195 lb (88 kg)	1968–08–27	Delaware State
G	5	Dion Glover	6 ft 5 in (1.96 m)	228 lb (103 kg)	1978–10–22	Georgia Tech
F	44	Alan Henderson	6 ft 9 in (2.06 m)	235 lb (107 kg)	1972–12–02	Indiana
G/F	1	DeMarr Johnson	6 ft 9 in (2.06 m)	201 lb (91 kg)	1980–05–05	Cincinnati
F	7	Toni Kukoč	6 ft 10 in (2.08 m)	192 lb (87 kg)	1968–09–18	Croatia
C	2	Nazr Mohammed	6 ft 10 in (2.08 m)	221 lb (100 kg)	1977–09–05	Kentucky
F	13	Hanno Möttölä	6 ft 11 in (2.11 m)	247 lb (112 kg)	1976–09–09	Utah
G	14	Ira Newble	6 ft 7 in (2.01 m)	220 lb (100 kg)	1975–01–20	Miami (OH)
F/C	42	Theo Ratliff (injured)	6 ft 10 in (2.08 m)	225 lb (102 kg)	1973–04–17	Wyoming
F	30	Mark Strickland	6 ft 9 in (2.06 m)	210 lb (95 kg)	1970–07–14	Temple
G	31	Jason Terry	6 ft 2 in (1.88 m)	185 lb (84 kg)	1977–09–15	Arizona
G	11	Jacque Vaughn	6 ft 1 in (1.85 m)	190 lb (86 kg)	1975–02–11	Kansas

Coaches
Head coach
- Lon Kruger
Assistant(s)
- Gar Heard
- Rick Mahorn
- Eric Musselman

Legend
- (DP) Unsigned draft pick
- (FA) Free agent
- (S) Suspended
- (IN) Inactive
- Injured

Roster

== Regular season ==
=== Season standings ===
Central Division	W	L	PCT	GB	Home	Road	Div
y-Detroit Pistons	50	32	.610	–	26–15	24–17	20–8
x-Charlotte Hornets	44	38	.537	6	21–20	23–18	17–11
x-Toronto Raptors	42	40	.512	8	24–17	18–23	17–11
x-Indiana Pacers	42	40	.512	8	25–16	17–24	13–15
e-Milwaukee Bucks	41	41	.500	9	25–16	16–25	17–11
e-Atlanta Hawks	33	49	.402	17	23–18	10–31	11–17
e-Cleveland Cavaliers	29	53	.354	21	20–21	9–32	12–16
e-Chicago Bulls	21	61	.256	29	14–27	7–34	5–23

#	Eastern Conference				
#	Team	W	L	PCT	GB
1	c-New Jersey Nets	52	30	.634	–
2	y-Detroit Pistons	50	32	.610	2
3	x-Boston Celtics	49	33	.598	3
4	x-Charlotte Hornets	44	38	.537	8
5	x-Orlando Magic	44	38	.537	8
6	x-Philadelphia 76ers	43	39	.524	9
7	x-Toronto Raptors	42	40	.512	10
8	x-Indiana Pacers	42	40	.512	10
9	e-Milwaukee Bucks	41	41	.500	11
10	e-Washington Wizards	37	45	.451	15
11	e-Miami Heat	36	46	.439	16
12	e-Atlanta Hawks	33	49	.402	19
13	e-New York Knicks	30	52	.366	22
14	e-Cleveland Cavaliers	29	53	.354	23
15	e-Chicago Bulls	21	61	.256	31

z - clinched division title
y - clinched division title
x - clinched playoff spot

== Player statistics ==
Legend
GP	Games played	GS	Games started	MPG	Minutes per game
FG%	Field-goal percentage	3P%	3-point field-goal percentage	FT%	Free-throw percentage
RPG	Rebounds per game	APG	Assists per game	SPG	Steals per game
BPG	Blocks per game	PPG	Points per game

=== Season ===
Player	GP	GS	MPG	FG%	3P%	FT%	RPG	APG	SPG	BPG	PPG
Shareef Abdur-Rahim	77	77	38.7	46.1	30.0	80.1	9.0	3.1	1.3	1.1	21.2
Jason Terry	78	78	38.0	43.0	38.7	83.5	3.5	5.7	1.8	0.2	19.3
Toni Kukoc	59	9	25.3	41.9	31.0	71.2	3.7	3.6	0.8	0.3	9.9
Nazr Mohammed	82	73	26.4	46.1	0.0	61.7	7.9	0.4	0.8	0.7	9.7
Dion Glover	55	25	21.0	42.1	33.0	75.7	3.1	1.5	0.8	0.3	8.9
Theo Ratliff	3	2	27.3	50.0	0.0	54.5	5.3	0.3	0.3	2.7	8.7
DerMarr Johnson	72	46	24.0	39.6	36.0	81.0	3.4	1.1	0.9	0.8	8.4
Ira Newble	42	35	30.3	49.8	14.3	85.2	5.3	1.1	0.9	0.5	8.0
Chris Crawford	7	4	18.7	46.7	0.0	73.3	3.6	0.7	0.3	0.7	7.6
Emanual Davis	28	20	27.6	35.4	34.1	88.9	2.6	2.4	1.0	0.2	6.6
Jacque Vaughn	82	16	22.6	47.0	44.4	82.5	2.0	4.3	0.8	0.0	6.6
Alan Henderson	26	1	16.2	50.9	100.0	53.3	3.7	0.4	0.4	0.6	5.5
Hanno Mottola	82	14	16.7	44.0	7.7	75.0	3.3	0.6	0.2	0.2	4.8
Mark Strickland	46	10	14.2	44.6	25.0	56.8	2.8	0.4	0.4	0.4	4.5
Reggie Slater	4	0	9.3	38.5	0.0	66.7	1.8	0.3	0.3	0.3	4.0
Cal Bowdler	52	0	11.3	35.1	20.0	83.0	2.1	0.2	0.3	0.3	3.1
Leon Smith	14	0	7.1	38.5	0.0	64.7	2.2	0.2	0.4	0.1	2.2
Dickey Simpkins	1	0	3.0	0.0	0.0	0.0	0.0	1.0	0.0	0.0	0.0

Player statistics citation:

== See also ==
- 2001-02 NBA season
