= 2001–02 New York Knicks season =

Season of National Basketball Association team the New York Knicks

- Head coach: Jeff Van Gundy (resigned); Don Chaney
- General manager: Scott Layden
- Owners: Cablevision
- Arena: Madison Square Garden

Results
- Record: 30–52 (.366)
- Place: Division: 7th (Atlantic); Conference: 13th (Eastern)
- Playoff finish: Did not qualify
- Stats at Basketball Reference

Local media
- Television: MSG Network
- Radio: WFAN

The 2001–02 New York Knicks season was the 56th season for the Knicks in the National Basketball Association (NBA).

== Season summary ==
=== Off-season ===
During the off-season, the Knicks acquired Shandon Anderson from the Houston Rockets, and Howard Eisley from the Dallas Mavericks in a three-team trade, and signed free agent Clarence Weatherspoon. Entering the season, the Knicks were without Larry Johnson, who retired during training camp due to lingering injuries, ending his 10-year career in the NBA.

For the season, the Knicks slightly redesigned their white home uniforms and blue road uniforms, removing the side panels from the bottom of their shorts. The team also removed the jersey numbers from the left side, and their primary logo from the right side of their shorts; the primary logo was moved to the left leg of their shorts. The team's slightly redesigned uniforms would remain in use until 2012. After the 2001–02 season, the Knicks' jersey was altered to incorporate the "NYK" subway token logo on the back.

=== Regular season ===
With the addition of Weatherspoon, Anderson and Eisley, the Knicks got off to a 10–9 start to the regular season. However, head coach Jeff Van Gundy unexpectedly resigned in December after 19 games, explaining he had "diminished focus", and was replaced with assistant coach Don Chaney as the Knicks' head coach; Van Gundy would later on return to coach the Houston Rockets in the 2003–04 season. Under Chaney, the Knicks fell below .500 in winning percentage, suffering an eight-game losing streak in January, and later on holding a 19–28 record at the All-Star break, as Marcus Camby missed the final 39 games due to a hip injury. The Knicks lost six of their final seven games of the season, and finished in last place in the Atlantic Division with a 30–52 record, missing the NBA playoffs for the first time since the 1986–87 season, and ending a 14-year playoff streak.

Allan Houston led the team in scoring, averaging 20.4 points per game, while Latrell Sprewell averaged 19.4 points and 3.9 assists per game, and led the Knicks with 145 three-point field goals, and Kurt Thomas provided the Knicks with 13.9 points and 9.1 rebounds per game. In addition, Camby averaged 11.1 points and rebounds per game each, and 1.7 blocks per game in only 29 games, while Weatherspoon provided the Knicks with 8.8 points and 8.2 rebounds per game, and Mark Jackson contributed 8.4 points and 7.4 assists per game. Meanwhile, Othella Harrington averaged 7.7 points and 4.5 rebounds per game, Charlie Ward provided the Knicks with 5.2 points and 3.2 assists, and Anderson contributed 5.0 points per game.

The Knicks finished fourth in the NBA in home-game attendance, with an attendance of 810,283 at Madison Square Garden during the regular season.

=== Aftermath ===
Following the season, Camby and Jackson were both traded to the Denver Nuggets on draft day; however, Jackson was released to free agency and signed with the Utah Jazz.

== NBA draft ==
Round	Pick	Player	Position	Nationality	School/Club team
2	38	Michael Wright	F	United States	Arizona
2	42	Eric Chenowith	C	United States	Kansas

== Roster ==
2001–02 New York Knicks roster
Players

Pos.	No.	Player	Height	Weight	DOB	From
G/F	49	Shandon Anderson	6 ft 6 in (1.98 m)	208 lb (94 kg)	1973–12–31	Georgia
F/C	23	Marcus Camby (injured)	6 ft 11 in (2.11 m)	220 lb (100 kg)	1974–03–22	UMass
G	4	Howard Eisley	6 ft 2 in (1.88 m)	177 lb (80 kg)	1972–12–04	Boston College
F	32	Othella Harrington	6 ft 9 in (2.06 m)	235 lb (107 kg)	1974–01–31	Georgetown
G	20	Allan Houston	6 ft 6 in (1.98 m)	200 lb (91 kg)	1971–04–20	Tennessee
F/C	44	Travis Knight	7 ft 0 in (2.13 m)	235 lb (107 kg)	1974–09–13	Connecticut
G	13	Mark Jackson	6 ft 1 in (1.85 m)	180 lb (82 kg)	1965–04–01	St. John's
G	7	Lavor Postell (injured)	6 ft 5 in (1.96 m)	215 lb (98 kg)	1978–02–26	St. John's
G	25	Larry Robinson	6 ft 3 in (1.91 m)	180 lb (82 kg)	1968–01–11	Centenary
C	50	Felton Spencer	7 ft 0 in (2.13 m)	265 lb (120 kg)	1968–01–15	Louisville
G/F	8	Latrell Sprewell	6 ft 5 in (1.96 m)	190 lb (86 kg)	1970–09–08	Alabama
F/C	40	Kurt Thomas	6 ft 9 in (2.06 m)	230 lb (104 kg)	1972–10–04	TCU
G	21	Charlie Ward	6 ft 2 in (1.88 m)	190 lb (86 kg)	1970–10–12	Florida State
F	35	Clarence Weatherspoon	6 ft 6 in (1.98 m)	240 lb (109 kg)	1970–09–08	Southern Miss

Coaches
Head coach
- Jeff Van Gundy (resigned)
- Don Chaney
Assistant(s)
- Greg Brittenham
- Steve Clifford
- Andy Greer
- Tom Thibodeau
- Herb Williams

Legend
- (DP) Unsigned draft pick
- (FA) Free agent
- (S) Suspended
- Injured

Roster
Updated: October 10, 2001

== Regular season ==
=== Season standings ===
Atlantic Division	W	L	PCT	GB	Home	Road	Div
y-New Jersey Nets	52	30	.634	–	33–8	19–22	16–8
x-Boston Celtics	49	33	.598	3	27–14	22–19	17–7
x-Orlando Magic	44	38	.537	8	27–14	17–24	12–12
x-Philadelphia 76ers	43	39	.524	9	22–19	21–20	14–11
e-Washington Wizards	37	45	.451	15	22–19	15–26	12–13
e-Miami Heat	36	46	.439	16	18–23	18–23	10–14
e-New York Knicks	30	52	.366	22	19–22	11–30	4–20

#	Eastern Conference				
#	Team	W	L	PCT	GB
1	c-New Jersey Nets	52	30	.634	–
2	y-Detroit Pistons	50	32	.610	2
3	x-Boston Celtics	49	33	.598	3
4	x-Charlotte Hornets	44	38	.537	8
5	x-Orlando Magic	44	38	.537	8
6	x-Philadelphia 76ers	43	39	.524	9
7	x-Toronto Raptors	42	40	.512	10
8	x-Indiana Pacers	42	40	.512	10
9	e-Milwaukee Bucks	41	41	.500	11
10	e-Washington Wizards	37	45	.451	15
11	e-Miami Heat	36	46	.439	16
12	e-Atlanta Hawks	33	49	.402	19
13	e-New York Knicks	30	52	.366	22
14	e-Cleveland Cavaliers	29	53	.354	23
15	e-Chicago Bulls	21	61	.256	31

== Player statistics ==
Legend
GP	Games played	GS	Games started	MPG	Minutes per game
FG%	Field-goal percentage	3P%	3-point field-goal percentage	FT%	Free-throw percentage
RPG	Rebounds per game	APG	Assists per game	SPG	Steals per game
BPG	Blocks per game	PPG	Points per game

=== Regular season ===
Player	GP	GS	MPG	FG%	3P%	FT%	RPG	APG	SPG	BPG	PPG
Shandon Anderson	82	6	19.5	.399	.277	.692	3.0	.9	.6	.2	5.0
Marcus Camby	29	29	34.7	.448	.000	.626	11.1	1.1	1.2	1.7	11.1
Howard Eisley	39	0	15.6	.337	.241	.796	1.3	2.6	.6	.1	4.4
Othella Harrington	77	4	20.3	.527	.000	.709	4.5	.5	.4	.5	7.7
Allan Houston	77	77	37.8	.437	.393	.870	3.3	2.5	.7	.1	20.4
Mark Jackson	82	82	28.9	.439	.405	.791	3.8	7.4	.9	.0	8.4
Travis Knight	49	0	8.8	.363		.762	2.1	.2	.2	.2	2.0
Lavor Postell	23	0	7.8	.333	.231	.756	.7	.2	.3	.0	4.0
Larry Robinson	2	0	5.0	.250	.500		1.0	.0	.0	.0	1.5
Felton Spencer	32	8	7.8	.231		.515	1.6	.1	.2	.3	.9
Latrell Sprewell	81	81	41.1	.404	.360	.821	3.7	3.9	1.2	.2	19.4
Kurt Thomas	82	82	33.8	.494	.167	.815	9.1	1.1	.9	1.0	13.9
Charlie Ward	63	0	16.8	.373	.323	.810	2.0	3.2	1.1	.2	5.2
Clarence Weatherspoon	56	41	30.9	.418		.795	8.2	1.1	.7	.9	8.8

Player statistics citation:
