= Jermaine Jackson (basketball) =

American basketball player (born 1976)

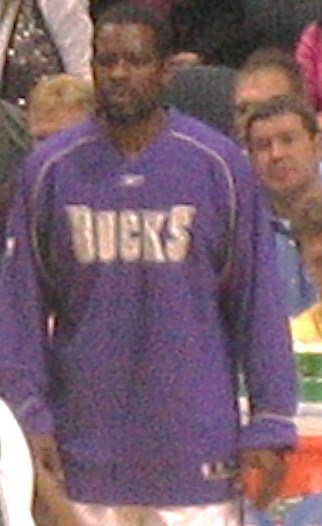
- Jackson with the Milwaukee Bucks in 2005

Personal information
- Born: June 7, 1976 (age 50) Detroit, Michigan, U.S.
- Listed height: 6 ft 4 in (1.93 m)
- Listed weight: 204 lb (93 kg)

Career information
- High school: Finney (Detroit, Michigan)
- College: Detroit Mercy (1995–1999)
- NBA draft: 1999: undrafted
- Playing career: 1999–2012
- Position: Point guard / shooting guard
- Number: 5, 8, 6
- Coaching career: 2012–present

Career history

Playing
- 1999–2000: Detroit Pistons
- 2000: Yakima Sun Kings
- 2001: Quad City Thunder
- 2001: Müller Verona
- 2001: Kansas Cagerz
- 2001–2002: Flint Fuze
- 2002: Toronto Raptors
- 2002: Great Lakes Storm
- 2002–2003: Toronto Raptors
- 2003: Atlanta Hawks
- 2003: Great Lakes Storm
- 2003: Aris BC
- 2004: Pallacanestro Treviso
- 2004–2005: Pamesa Valencia
- 2005: Great Lakes Storm
- 2005: New York Knicks
- 2005–2006: Milwaukee Bucks
- 2006–2007: Azovmash Mariupol
- 2007–2008: Baloncesto León
- 2008–2009: Snaidero Udine
- 2009–2010: Central Entrerriano
- 2010–2011: Lobos Grises
- 2011–2012: Maccabi Haifa B.C.

Coaching
- 2012–2014: Mount Clemens HS
- 2015–2018: Detroit (assistant)
- 2018–2019: SPIRE Institute

Career highlights
- Israeli Basketball Super League All-Star (2012); Ukrainian League champion (2007); Italian Basketball Cup champion (2004); MCC Player of the Year (1999); First-team All-MCC (1999); Second-team All-MCC (1998); MCC All-Defensive team (1999)
- Stats at NBA.com
- Stats at Basketball Reference

Jermaine Maurice Jackson Sr. (born June 7, 1976) is an American former professional basketball player.

== Early life ==
Born and raised in Detroit, Michigan, Jackson graduated from Finney High School of Detroit in 1995. At the University of Detroit Mercy, Jackson played four seasons on the Detroit Titans men's basketball team. Considered one of the Top 50 Midwestern Collegiate Conference / Horizon League Players from (1994–2012).

== Professional career ==
Jackson was undrafted in 1999 following a college career at the University of Detroit Mercy and began his professional career with the Detroit Pistons (1999–00), going on to play for the Toronto Raptors (2002–03), Atlanta Hawks (2003) and New York Knicks (2005), averaging 2.2 points, 1.1 rebounds and 1.5 assists per game in his NBA career. The Knicks included Jackson in a trade along with Mike Sweetney and Tim Thomas in exchange for Antonio Davis and Eddy Curry of the Chicago Bulls. He was cut by the Bulls on October 18, 2005, and was signed by the Milwaukee Bucks on December 15, 2005. He played for the Bucks in the 2005–06 season, with the team renouncing their NBA rights to him on July 19, 2007. Jackson signed with the Seattle SuperSonics on October 1, and was waived during that month.

He also played professionally in the CBA, as well as in Europe for a number of teams, winning the 2004 Italian Cup with Benetton Treviso.

In January 2011 he signed with Maccabi Haifa B.C. in Israel. Maccabi released him in March 2012. While with Maccabi, Jackson played in the Israeli Basketball Super League All-Star Game in 2012.

== NBA career statistics ==
Legend
GP	Games played	GS	Games started	MPG	Minutes per game
FG%	Field goal percentage	3P%	3-point field goal percentage	FT%	Free throw percentage
RPG	Rebounds per game	APG	Assists per game	SPG	Steals per game
BPG	Blocks per game	PPG	Points per game	**Bold**	Career high

=== Regular season ===
Year	Team	GP	GS	MPG	FG%	3P%	FT%	RPG	APG	SPG	BPG	PPG
1999–00	Detroit	7	0	10.4	.091	.000	.625	**1.6**	0.6	**0.4**	0.0	1.0
2001–02	Toronto	24	0	11.7	.476	**.500**	.667	1.1	**2.4**	**0.4**	0.0	2.4
2002–03	Toronto	24	1	**11.9**	.309	.111	.852	1.0	1.6	**0.4**	**0.1**	**2.8**
2002–03	Atlanta	29	0	9.4	.452	.000	.607	1.1	1.2	0.3	**0.1**	1.9
2004–05	New York	21	0	11.0	**.515**	.000	.615	1.1	1.1	0.3	0.0	2.0
2005–06	Milwaukee	**30**	**2**	6.7	.423	.250	**.857**	0.9	0.8	0.1	0.0	1.2
Career		135	3	10.0	.401	.158	.711	1.1	1.4	0.3	0.1	1.9

=== Playoffs ===
Year	Team	GP	GS	MPG	FG%	3P%	FT%	RPG	APG	SPG	BPG	PPG
2001–02	Toronto	**4**	0	**3.0**	**.667**	.000	**.333**	**0.3**	0.0	0.0	0.0	**1.5**
2005–06	Milwaukee	2	0	2.0	.000	.000	.000	0.0	**1.0**	0.0	0.0	0.0
Career		6	0	2.7	.400	.000	.333	0.2	0.3	0.0	0.0	1.0

== Post-playing career ==
Jermaine Jackson returned to Michigan after being released from Maccabi Haifa and opened the Jermaine Jackson-Cairns Community Center in Mount Clemens in May. The community center also includes the Jermaine Jackson Academy for youth basketball instruction. Jackson also that year became the boys' basketball coach at Mount Clemens High School.

On June 29, 2015, Jackson was named Assistant Men's Basketball Coach for University of Detroit Mercy. After the dismissal of UDM head coach Ray McCallum in the spring of 2016, Jackson was appointed interim head coach until the Titans hired Bacari Alexander who kept Jackson on staff as the lead associate.

In late June 2018, Jackson joined SPIRE Institute, a prep school in Geneva, Ohio, as the head basketball coach. During his first season, one of the players he coached was LaMelo Ball, a player who previously played professionally in Lithuania, as well as in his father's Junior Basketball Association. Jackson was named Coach of the Year of The Grind Session during his tenure with Spire.

More recently he has become LaMelo Ball's manager.

== Personal life ==
Jackson's cousin, Brandon Jenkins, is also a professional basketballer. He currently plays in Switzerland for BC Boncourt.

Jackson's son, Jermaine Jr., is also a basketball player who is committed to play at his father's alma mater and former school of employment, the University of Detroit Mercy under head coach and close family friend Bacari Alexander.
