= Travis Best =

American basketball player (born 1972)

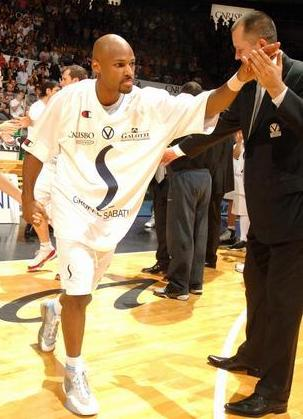
- Best in 2007

Personal information
- Born: July 12, 1972 (age 54) Springfield, Massachusetts, U.S.
- Listed height: 5 ft 11 in (1.80 m)
- Listed weight: 182 lb (83 kg)

Career information
- High school: Springfield Central (Springfield, Massachusetts)
- College: Georgia Tech (1991–1995)
- NBA draft: 1995: 1st round, 23rd overall pick
- Drafted by: Indiana Pacers
- Playing career: 1995–2009
- Position: Point guard
- Number: 4, 6, 1, 3

Career history
- 1995–2002: Indiana Pacers
- 2002: Chicago Bulls
- 2002–2003: Miami Heat
- 2003–2004: Dallas Mavericks
- 2004–2005: New Jersey Nets
- 2005–2006: UNICS Kazan
- 2006–2007: Virtus Bologna
- 2007: Asseco Prokom Gdynia
- 2007–2008: Virtus Bologna
- 2008–2009: Air Avellino
- 2009: NSB Napoli

Career highlights
- Polish League champion (2007); 2× Second-team All-ACC (1994, 1995); Third-team All-ACC (1993); McDonald's All-American (1991); First-team Parade All-American (1991); Second-team Parade All-American (1990)
- Stats at NBA.com
- Stats at Basketball Reference

Travis Best (born July 12, 1972) is an American former professional basketball player, who played in the National Basketball Association (NBA) and in Europe. He played college basketball for the Georgia Tech Yellow Jackets.

== High school career ==
Best attended Springfield Central High School, starring on teams that amassed a 69–4 record in his three seasons, earning the Lahovich Award as the top player in Western Massachusetts from 1989 to 1991. After his junior season, he was named a second-team Parade All-American. During his senior season, Best scored a state-record 81 points in a single game. With then-sophomore teammate Edgar Padilla, a future UMass standout, Best led his 25–0 team to the 1991 Division I state championship and a No. 15 ranking in the final USA Today Top 25. After earning Gatorade's Massachusetts and New England Player of the Year honors, Best was selected to play in both the McDonald's All-American Game and McDonald's Capital Classic, earning first-team Parade All-American honors and being the only guard chosen for USA Today's All-USA first team. After considering both UConn and the University of Virginia, Best chose Georgia Tech.

== Collegiate career ==
At Georgia Tech, Best teamed with fellow McDonald's All-American James Forrest for four years. The duo lead the Yellow Jackets to the 1993 ACC tournament championship, their first since 1990. Best was named to the All-ACC third-team as a sophomore, earning second-team honors as a junior and as a senior. Best led the ACC in assist-to-turnover ratio and free-throw percentage as a senior, while capturing ACC Player of the Week honors a league-record five times.

Best ranked in the top six in Tech history in points, assists, minutes, 3-point field goals made and steals at the conclusion of his collegiate career. He was one of only three ACC players to score 2,000 points with 600 assists (UNC's Phil Ford and Maryland's Greivis Vasquez are the other two). He earned honorable-mention All-America honors from The Associated Press and was a nominee for the Frances Pomeroy Naismith Award, given to the best player in the nation under 6 feet (1.8 m).

== Professional career ==
Best was drafted 23rd in the 1995 NBA draft by the Indiana Pacers. He played for the Pacers, the Chicago Bulls, the Miami Heat, the Dallas Mavericks and the New Jersey Nets, averaging 7.6 points and 3.5 assists per game.

Best was a vital backup at point guard on the 1999–2000 Indiana team that went to the 2000 NBA Finals. Best hit the game-winning 3-pointer in the decisive fifth game against the Milwaukee Bucks in the first round of the playoffs. During the 2001–2002 season, he requested a trade and was granted one to the Chicago Bulls. The Bulls traded Ron Artest, Brad Miller, Ron Mercer and Kevin Ollie to the Pacers for Best, Jalen Rose and Norman Richardson, adding a future second-round pick.

== NBA career statistics ==
Legend
GP	Games played	GS	Games started	MPG	Minutes per game
FG%	Field goal percentage	3P%	3-point field goal percentage	FT%	Free throw percentage
RPG	Rebounds per game	APG	Assists per game	SPG	Steals per game
BPG	Blocks per game	PPG	Points per game	**Bold**	Career high
*	Led the league

=== Regular season ===
Year	Team	GP	GS	MPG	FG%	3P%	FT%	RPG	APG	SPG	BPG	PPG
1995–96	Indiana	59	1	9.7	.423	.320	.833	.7	1.6	.3	**.1**	3.7
1996–97	Indiana	76	46	27.2	.442	.368	.756	2.2	4.2	1.3	**.1**	9.9
1997–98	Indiana	**82***	0	18.9	.419	.300	.855	1.5	3.4	1.0	**.1**	6.5
1998–99	Indiana	49	0	21.3	.416	.373	.843	1.6	3.4	.9	**.1**	7.1
1999–00	Indiana	**82**	0	20.6	**.483**	.376	.821	1.7	3.3	.9	**.1**	8.9
2000–01	Indiana	77	21	**31.9**	.440	.381	.827	**2.9**	**6.1**	**1.4**	**.1**	**11.9**
2001–02	Indiana	44	3	21.8	.439	**.382**	.877	1.6	4.0	1.3	**.1**	6.9
2001–02	Chicago	30	18	26.4	.441	.320	**.922**	2.7	5.0	1.1	.0	9.3
2002–03	Miami	72	**52**	25.1	.396	.330	.854	2.0	3.5	.6	**.1**	8.4
2003–04	Dallas	61	1	12.5	.372	.150	.870	1.1	1.8	.5	**.1**	2.8
2004–05	New Jersey	76	6	19.2	.420	.306	.885	1.4	1.9	.9	**.1**	6.8
Career		708	148	21.4	.431	.345	.835	1.8	3.5	.9	.1	7.6

=== Playoffs ===
Year	Team	GP	GS	MPG	FG%	3P%	FT%	RPG	APG	SPG	BPG	PPG
1996	Indiana	5	0	16.8	**.500**	.167	.857	2.2	1.8	**1.2**	.0	5.8
1998	Indiana	16	0	17.5	.375	.278	.884	1.0	1.9	.7	**.2**	6.1
1999	Indiana	11	0	13.6	.348	.200	.923	1.5	1.9	.4	.1	4.2
2000	Indiana	**23**	0	20.1	.430	**.433**	.841	2.5	2.9	.8	**.2**	8.9
2001	Indiana	4	**4**	**40.8**	.436	.333	**1.000**	**4.8**	**9.3**	1.0	.0	**9.8**
2005	New Jersey	4	0	20.3	.409	.111	.889	1.5	2.3	.3	.0	6.8
Career		63	4	19.4	.413	.303	.875	2.0	2.7	.7	.1	7.0

== Personal life ==
Best had a small role in the 1998 Spike Lee film He Got Game, which also featured NBA players Ray Allen, Walter McCarty, John Wallace, and Rick Fox.
