= 2001–02 Washington Wizards season =

NBA professional basketball team season

- Head coach: Doug Collins
- President: Wes Unseld
- General manager: Wes Unseld
- Owner: Abe Pollin
- Arena: MCI Center

Results
- Record: 37–45 (.451)
- Place: Division: 5th (Atlantic); Conference: 10th (Eastern)
- Playoff finish: Did not qualify
- Stats at Basketball Reference

Local media
- Television: Comcast SportsNet Mid-Atlantic
- Radio: WTEM

The 2001–02 Washington Wizards season was the 41st season for the Washington Wizards in the National Basketball Association, and their 29th season in Washington, D.C. This season was most memorable for the return of All-Star guard, and six-time NBA champion Michael Jordan, who came out of his second retirement to play for the Wizards at age 38.

== Season summary ==
=== Off-season ===
After finishing with a 19–63 record the previous season, the Wizards won the NBA draft lottery, and selected power forward, and high school basketball star Kwame Brown with the first overall pick in the 2001 NBA draft. During the off-season, the team signed free agent Tyronn Lue, who previously won two NBA championships with the Los Angeles Lakers, acquired rookie center, and first-round draft pick Brendan Haywood from the Orlando Magic, who had acquired him from the Cleveland Cavaliers, the team that drafted him, and acquired rookie shooting guard, and second-round draft pick Bobby Simmons from the Seattle SuperSonics. The Wizards hired head coach Doug Collins, who coached Jordan and the Chicago Bulls from 1986 to 1989. Jordan would also reunite with former Dream Team member Christian Laettner from the 1992 Summer Olympics in Barcelona, Spain.

=== Regular season ===
In the team's regular season opener on October 30, 2001, Jordan played in his first game with the Wizards, in a 93–91 road loss to the New York Knicks at Madison Square Garden, in front of a sellout crowd of 19,763 fans in attendance; Jordan scored 19 points along with 5 rebounds, 6 assists, and 4 steals in 37 minutes, but struggled as he only made 7 out of 21 field-goal attempts.

Under Collins and with the addition of Jordan, the Wizards struggled with a 2–9 start to the regular season, posting an eight-game losing streak in November, but then posted a nine-game winning streak in December, holding a 26–21 record before the All-Star break. However, the team lost 14 of their next 17 games, as Jordan suffered a right knee injury and was out for the remainder of the season after 60 games. The Wizards finished in fifth place in the Atlantic Division with a 37–45 record, which was an 18-game improvement over the previous season; however, the team missed the NBA playoffs for the fifth consecutive year.

Jordan averaged 22.9 points, 5.7 rebounds, 5.2 assists and 1.4 steals per game, despite shooting .416 in field-goal percentage, while Richard Hamilton finished second on the team in scoring, averaging 20.0 points per game, but only played 63 games due to a groin injury, and three-point specialist Chris Whitney provided the team with 10.2 points and 3.8 assists per game, and also led them with 131 three-point field goals. In addition, second-year guard Courtney Alexander contributed 9.8 points per game, while Lue averaged 7.8 points and 3.5 assists per game, Hubert Davis contributed 7.2 points per game, and Tyrone Nesby provided with 6.3 points and 4.5 rebounds per game. On the defensive side, Laettner averaged 7.1 points and 5.3 rebounds per game, while Popeye Jones averaged 7.0 points and led the Wizards with 7.3 rebounds per game, Jahidi White provided the team with 5.4 points, 6.3 rebounds and 1.1 blocks per game, and Haywood provided with 5.1 points, 5.2 rebounds, and led the team with 1.5 blocks per game. Brown failed to live up to expectations as a top draft pick, only averaging just 4.5 points and 3.5 rebounds per game off the bench, while shooting .387 in field-goal percentage.

During the NBA All-Star weekend at the First Union Center in Philadelphia, Pennsylvania, Jordan was selected for the 2002 NBA All-Star Game, as a member of the Eastern Conference All-Star team. Jordan struggled as he only scored 8 points, and made 4 out of 13 field-goal attempts, as the Eastern Conference lost to the Western Conference, 135–120. Meanwhile, Haywood was selected for the NBA Rookie Challenge Game, as a member of the Rookies team. Jordan also finished in 13th place in Most Valuable Player voting, while Collins finished tied in seventh place in Coach of the Year voting.

Jordan's return to the NBA also helped raise popularity, and media attention for the Wizards, as the team finished second in the league in home-game attendance behind the San Antonio Spurs, with an attendance of 847,634 at the MCI Center. The team sold out all 41 of their home games, and 38 of their road games during the regular season.

=== Aftermath ===
Following the season, Hamilton and Davis were both traded to the Detroit Pistons, while Whitney was traded to the Denver Nuggets, and Alexander was dealt to the New Orleans Hornets. Meanwhile, Jones re-signed as a free agent with his former team, the Dallas Mavericks, and Nesby was released to free agency.

== Offseason ==
During the off-season, the team fired head coach Leonard Hamilton and replaced him with Doug Collins.

On July 18, the Wizards signed Tyronn Lue, who would be Chris Whitney's backup during the season. A week later, the team waived forward Michael Smith.

On August 1, the Wizards traded Laron Profit and a 2005 1st-round draft pick to the Orlando Magic for Brendan Haywood. Haywood would play with the Wizards for almost nine years, until he was traded in February 2010.

On September 25, the Wizards signed Michael Jordan. At 38 years old, Jordan would be the team's points-per-game leader during the season. He also led the team in assists per game.

On October 8, the Wizards waived small forward Mike Smith.

On October 24, the team released Kornél Dávid.

=== NBA draft ===
Round	Pick	Player	Position	Nationality	College
1	1	Kwame Brown	Center	United States	Glynn Academy (Brunswick, GA)

== Roster ==
2001–02 Washington Wizards roster
Players

Pos.	No.	Player	Height	Weight	DOB	From
SG	4	Courtney Alexander	6 ft 5 in (1.96 m)	205 lb (93 kg)	1977–04–27	Fresno State
PF	5	Kwame Brown	6 ft 11 in (2.11 m)	270 lb (122 kg)	1982–03–10	Glynn Academy (GA)
SG	24	Hubert Davis	6 ft 5 in (1.96 m)	183 lb (83 kg)	1970–05–17	North Carolina
SG	32	Richard Hamilton	6 ft 7 in (2.01 m)	193 lb (88 kg)	1978–02–14	Connecticut
C	3	Brendan Haywood	7 ft 0 in (2.13 m)	268 lb (122 kg)	1979–11–27	North Carolina
PF	54	Popeye Jones	6 ft 8 in (2.03 m)	250 lb (113 kg)	1970–06–17	Murray State
SF	23	Michael Jordan	6 ft 6 in (1.98 m)	195 lb (88 kg)	1963–02–17	North Carolina
PF	44	Christian Laettner	6 ft 11 in (2.11 m)	235 lb (107 kg)	1969–08–17	Duke
PG	10	Tyronn Lue	6 ft 0 in (1.83 m)	175 lb (79 kg)	1977–05–03	Nebraska
SF	8	Tyrone Nesby	6 ft 6 in (1.98 m)	225 lb (102 kg)	1976–01–31	UNLV
SF	21	Bobby Simmons	6 ft 7 in (2.01 m)	210 lb (95 kg)	1980–06–02	DePaul
C	36	Etan Thomas	6 ft 9 in (2.06 m)	256 lb (116 kg)	1978–04–01	Syracuse
C	55	Jahidi White	6 ft 9 in (2.06 m)	290 lb (132 kg)	1976–02–19	Georgetown
PG	12	Chris Whitney	6 ft 0 in (1.83 m)	168 lb (76 kg)	1971–10–05	Clemson

Coaches
Head coach
- Doug Collins
Assistant(s)
- Johnny Bach
- Larry Drew
- Brian James

Legend
- (DP) Unsigned draft pick
- (FA) Free agent
- (S) Suspended
- Injured

Roster

== Regular season ==
After retiring from the Chicago Bulls in early 1999, Michael Jordan became the Washington Wizards' president of basketball operations as well as a minority owner in January 2000. In September 2001, after divesting himself of any ownership of the team due to NBA rules, Jordan came out of retirement at age 38 to play basketball for the Washington Wizards. Jordan stated that he was returning for the love of the game, indicating his intention to donate his salary as a player to a relief effort for the victims of the September 11 attacks. Jordan was heading into his return dealing with tendinitis in his wrist and both of his knees, from which he would have fluid drained multiple times throughout the season. In addition, during a pickup game before the season, Ron Artest broke two of Jordan's ribs. The Wizards finished with the third worst record at 19–63 the previous season, their worst season in franchise history, and started the new season with a 2–9 record. However, they would then go on to have a nine-game winning streak and improve their record to 14–12.

On December 27, in a blowout 81–108 loss to the Indiana Pacers, Jordan scored only 6 points on 20% shooting in 25 minutes, ending his 866-game streak with at least 10 points. This poor performance and reduced minutes led Jordan to question his coach Doug Collins' faith in his abilities, asking him whether he could still play. In the next two games, Jordan scored 51 and 45 points, respectively, to start a four-win streak. In the first game against the Charlotte Hornets, Jordan scored 51 points on 55% shooting and added 7 rebounds, 4 assists, and 3 steals in a 107–90 win. The second game was against the New Jersey Nets, who would go on to be in the 2002 NBA Finals, and Jordan added 10 rebounds, 7 assists, and 3 steals to 45 points on 50% shooting in a 98–76 win. With these performances, Jordan became the only player in NBA history to score 50 points in three different decades, and at the time he was also the oldest player to score 50 points at 38 years, 315 days.

After a four-win streak, the Wizards entered a four-loss streak and continued to have a 50% winning pace. At the end of January 2002, Jordan recorded two back-to-back 40-points game, including a game-winning buzzer beater over the Cleveland Cavaliers, resulting in two wins and a 21–20 record. Before the All-Star break, Jordan was only one of two players, along with Kobe Bryant, to average more than 25 points, 5 rebounds, and 5 assists, as he led the Wizards to a 26–21 record, and the only player and oldest to average more than 25 points, 6 rebounds, and 5 assists (Tracy McGrady would become the only player to average at least 25–6–5 by the end of the 2001–02 season). In total, Jordan was averaging per game 25.2 points, 6.2 rebounds, 5.3 assists, 1.5 steals, and 0.5 blocks on 42.1% shooting. In addition, the Wizards had a winning record of 26–21 and were in playoff contention, as they were seeded 5th on a 5-game win streak and had won 7 out of the latest 8 games.

In the last game before the All-Star break, Jordan suffered a knee injury in a collision with Etan Thomas on February 7 against the Sacramento Kings. In the 46 games that Jordan played before the injury, he averaged per game 25.1 points, 6.2 rebounds, 5.3 assists, 1.5 steals, and 0.5 blocks on 42% shooting. Jordan's numbers were also improving as the season went on, as in his last 20 games up to the injury he averaged per game 27.5 points, 6.4 rebounds, 5.2 assists, 1.3 steals, and 0.5 blocks on 44% shooting, and in his last 10 games up to the injury he averaged per game 29.7 points, 6.6 rebounds, 6.1 assists, 1.2 steals, and 0.3 blocks on 47% shooting. Before the injury, Jordan was considered an MVP contender at the age of 38 for what could have been a record-tying 6th MVP award; he would eventually finish 13th in the MVP ballot won by Tim Duncan.

The Wizards would lose 9 of their next 10 games following Jordan's knee injury. In the Wizards' 26–21 stretch, Richard Hamilton, the best scorer after Jordan, missed 5 weeks of playing time due to a groin injury. Starting with a November 28 win over the Philadelphia 76ers, the Wizards were 15–1 in the last 16 games that Jordan and Hamilton played together prior to Jordan's injury on February 7; no team had gone from less than 20 wins to 50 wins or a winning record the following season. At the time, the Wizards were on a 45-win pace for the season. In addition, the Wizards had the second worst defense in the league in terms of opponents' points allowed per game but with Jordan, the only significant addition to the roster, the Wizard became the sixth best defense, allowing only 92.2 points per game and only 90.0 points per game in the last 35 games before Jordan's injury, further improving to become the third best defense. With both Jordan and Hamilton in the 26–21 stretch, the Wizards had the best defense with 86.3 points allowed per game, 2.4 points less than the best defense throughout the season, the Miami Heat. After Jordan's injury, the Wizards allowed 96.8 points per game, falling to 19th place.

After the All-Star break, Jordan's knee could not handle the workload of a full-season, as he ended the season on the injured list due to knee soreness. Although Jordan tried to play through the pain and on reduced minutes in the next 4 games and then the next 3, he was not the same and the Wizards went 1–7. Jordan's torn cartilage right knee injury and its aftermath knee soreness and losing streak moved the Wizards away from playoff contention. After 14 more games, Jordan had arthroscopic knee surgery and his season ended after only 60 games, the fewest he had played in a regular season since playing 17 games after returning from his first retirement during the 1994–95 season. Jordan started 53 of his 60 games for the season, averaging 24.3 points, 6.0 rebounds, 5.4 assists, and shooting 41.9% from the field in his 53 starts, achieving a 30–30 record and 8 double-doubles. His last seven appearances were in a reserve role, in which he averaged just over 20 minutes per game. After going 26–20 (0.565 win%) in the 46 games that Jordan played pre-injury, the Wizards went 11–25 (0.306 win%) in the games that he missed and played after injury, finishing the season with a 37–45 record for 10th place in the East. Still, Jordan had led the Wizards to an 18-win improvement from the previous season.

The immediate impact of Jordan's presence was seen on the Wizards' popularity and media presence. The team that ranked 18th in NBA home attendance and 26th in road one rose to third and second respectively, selling out every game at the MCI Center and only failing to do so in the three away games following Jordan's injury. Ratings rose on NBC, TNT and foreign cable. Chris Whitney was the only Wizard player to play all 82 games while Popeye Jones, Jordan, and Brendan Haywood had the best average for rebounds, assists, and blocks at 7.3, 5.2, and 1.5, respectively. Jordan also led the team in steals at 1.4 and points at 22.9, with only Hamilton also scoring at least 20 points. Kwame Brown, the number-one draft pick in the 2001 NBA draft, averaged 4.5 points and 3.5 rebounds per game. His subpar performance as a first-overall draft pick has led many analysts to label Brown as one of the "biggest busts" in NBA history.

=== Standings ===
Atlantic Division	W	L	PCT	GB	Home	Road	Div
y-New Jersey Nets	52	30	.634	–	33–8	19–22	16–8
x-Boston Celtics	49	33	.598	3	27–14	22–19	17–7
x-Orlando Magic	44	38	.537	8	27–14	17–24	12–12
x-Philadelphia 76ers	43	39	.524	9	22–19	21–20	14–11
e-Washington Wizards	37	45	.451	15	22–19	15–26	12–13
e-Miami Heat	36	46	.439	16	18–23	18–23	10–14
e-New York Knicks	30	52	.366	22	19–22	11–30	4–20

#	Eastern Conference				
#	Team	W	L	PCT	GB
1	c-New Jersey Nets	52	30	.634	–
2	y-Detroit Pistons	50	32	.610	2
3	x-Boston Celtics	49	33	.598	3
4	x-Charlotte Hornets	44	38	.537	8
5	x-Orlando Magic	44	38	.537	8
6	x-Philadelphia 76ers	43	39	.524	9
7	x-Toronto Raptors	42	40	.512	10
8	x-Indiana Pacers	42	40	.512	10
9	e-Milwaukee Bucks	41	41	.500	11
10	e-Washington Wizards	37	45	.451	15
11	e-Miami Heat	36	46	.439	16
12	e-Atlanta Hawks	33	49	.402	19
13	e-New York Knicks	30	52	.366	22
14	e-Cleveland Cavaliers	29	53	.354	23
15	e-Chicago Bulls	21	61	.256	31

== Player statistics ==
Legend
GP	Games played	GS	Games started	MPG	Minutes per game
FG%	Field-goal percentage	3P%	3-point field-goal percentage	FT%	Free-throw percentage
RPG	Rebounds per game	APG	Assists per game	SPG	Steals per game
BPG	Blocks per game	PPG	Points per game

=== Regular season ===
Player	GP	GS	MPG	FG%	3P%	FT%	RPG	APG	SPG	BPG	PPG
Courtney Alexander	56	28	23.7	.470	.278	.810	2.6	1.5	.6	.1	9.8
Kwame Brown	57	3	14.3	.387	.000	.707	3.5	.8	.3	.5	4.5
Hubert Davis	51	17	24.1	.448	.452	.762	1.5	2.1	.5	.1	7.2
Richard Hamilton	63	57	35.0	.435	.381	.890	3.4	2.7	.6	.2	20.0
Brendan Haywood	62	2	20.4	.493		.606	5.2	.5	.3	1.5	5.1
Popeye Jones	79	40	24.3	.437	.364	.815	7.3	1.6	.6	.2	7.0
Michael Jordan	60	53	34.9	.416	.189	.790	5.7	5.2	1.4	.4	22.9
Christian Laettner	57	48	25.3	.464	.200	.868	5.3	2.6	1.1	.4	7.1
Tyronn Lue	71	0	20.5	.427	.447	.762	1.7	3.5	.7	.0	7.8
Tyrone Nesby	70	9	21.4	.435	.277	.688	4.5	1.3	.9	.3	6.3
Bobby Simmons	30	3	11.4	.453	.286	.733	1.7	.6	.4	.2	3.7
Etan Thomas	47	0	13.1	.536		.554	3.9	.1	.4	.7	4.3
Jahidi White	71	69	19.0	.538		.539	6.3	.2	.4	1.1	5.4
Chris Whitney	82	81	26.5	.418	.406	.880	1.9	3.8	.9	.1	10.2

Player statistics citation:
