= 2001–02 Milwaukee Bucks season =

NBA professional basketball team season

- Head coach: George Karl
- General manager: Ernie Grunfeld
- Owner: Herb Kohl
- Arena: Bradley Center

Results
- Record: 41–41 (.500)
- Place: Division: 5th (Central); Conference: 9th (Eastern)
- Playoff finish: Did not qualify
- Stats at Basketball Reference

Local media
- Television: WCGV-TV; Fox Sports Net North
- Radio: WTMJ

The 2001–02 Milwaukee Bucks season was the 34th season for the Milwaukee Bucks in the National Basketball Association.

== Season summary ==
=== Off-season ===
During the off-season, the Bucks signed free agent Anthony Mason to shore up their front line. For the season, the Bucks slightly updated their white home uniforms and purple road uniforms, adding side panels to their jerseys, and changing the color of the team name "Bucks", and jersey numbers on their road jerseys from white to silver. The team's updated uniforms would remain in use until 2006.

=== Regular season ===
With the addition of Mason, the Bucks got off to a solid start by winning nine of their first ten games of the regular season, but then lost five straight afterwards. The team posted an eight-game winning streak in January, which led them to a division-leading record of 26–13 as of January 21, 2002, and held a 28–18 record at the All-Star break. At mid-season, the team signed free agent Greg Anthony, who was previously released by the Chicago Bulls. However, with a 35–25 record as of March 6, the Bucks struggled losing 16 of their final 22 games of the season, finished in fifth place in the Central Division with a disappointing 41–41 record, and failed to qualify for the NBA playoffs. On the final day of the regular season on April 17, the Bucks suffered an embarrassing road loss to the Detroit Pistons, 123–89 at The Palace of Auburn Hills, and finished just one game behind the 8th–seeded Indiana Pacers. This was one of the biggest late-season collapses for a team that was contending for a Division title in March.

Ray Allen averaged 21.8 points, 3.9 assists and 1.3 steals per game, and led the league with 229 three-point field goals, while Glenn Robinson averaged 20.7 points, 6.2 rebounds and 1.5 steals per game, and Sam Cassell provided the team with 19.7 points and 6.7 assists per game. In addition, Mason contributed 9.6 points, 7.9 rebounds and 4.2 assists per game, while off the bench, sixth man Tim Thomas averaged 11.7 points per game, and second-year guard Michael Redd showed improvement averaging 11.4 points per game. Meanwhile, Anthony contributed 7.2 points, 3.3 assists and 1.2 steals per game in 24 games, Darvin Ham averaged 4.3 points and 2.9 rebounds per game, second-year center Joel Pryzbilla provided with 2.7 points, 4.0 rebounds and 1.7 blocks per game, and Ervin Johnson contributed 2.6 points, 5.8 rebounds and 1.0 blocks per game.

During the NBA All-Star weekend at the First Union Center in Philadelphia, Pennsylvania, Allen was selected for the 2002 NBA All-Star Game, as a member of the Eastern Conference All-Star team. In addition, Allen participated in the NBA Three-Point Shootout for the third consecutive year. Redd finished tied in ninth place in Most Improved Player voting. The Bucks finished twelfth in the NBA in home-game attendance, with an attendance of 745,305 at the Bradley Center during the regular season.

=== Aftermath ===
Following the season, Robinson was traded to the Atlanta Hawks after eight seasons with the Bucks, while Ham signed as a free agent with the Hawks, and Anthony retired.

== Draft picks ==
| Round | Pick | Player | Position | Nationality | College |
|---|---|---|---|---|---|
| 2 | 51 | Andre Hutson | F | United States | Michigan State |

== Roster ==
2001–02 Milwaukee Bucks roster
Players

| Pos. | No. | Player | Height | Weight | DOB | From |
|---|---|---|---|---|---|---|
| G | 34 | Ray Allen | 6 ft 5 in (1.96 m) | 205 lb (93 kg) | 1975–07–20 | Connecticut |
| G | 11 | Rafer Alston | 6 ft 2 in (1.88 m) | 190 lb (86 kg) | 1976–07–24 | Fresno State |
| G | 50 | Greg Anthony | 6 ft 0 in (1.83 m) | 176 lb (80 kg) | 1967–11–15 | UNLV |
| F | 35 | Jason Caffey | 6 ft 8 in (2.03 m) | 256 lb (116 kg) | 1973–06–12 | Alabama |
| G | 10 | Sam Cassell | 6 ft 3 in (1.91 m) | 185 lb (84 kg) | 1969–11–18 | Florida State |
| C | 44 | Greg Foster | 6 ft 11 in (2.11 m) | 240 lb (109 kg) | 1968–10–03 | UTEP |
| F | 21 | Darvin Ham | 6 ft 7 in (2.01 m) | 220 lb (100 kg) | 1973–07–23 | Texas Tech |
| C | 40 | Ervin Johnson | 6 ft 11 in (2.11 m) | 245 lb (111 kg) | 1967–12–21 | LSU New Orleans |
| F | 17 | Anthony Mason | 6 ft 7 in (2.01 m) | 250 lb (113 kg) | 1966–12–14 | Tennessee State |
| F | 41 | Mark Pope | 6 ft 10 in (2.08 m) | 235 lb (107 kg) | 1972–09–11 | Kentucky |
| C | 6 | Joel Przybilla | 7 ft 1 in (2.16 m) | 245 lb (111 kg) | 1979–10–10 | Minnesota |
| G/F | 22 | Michael Redd | 6 ft 6 in (1.98 m) | 215 lb (98 kg) | 1979–08–24 | Ohio State |
| F | 13 | Glenn Robinson | 6 ft 7 in (2.01 m) | 240 lb (109 kg) | 1973–01–10 | Purdue |
| F | 5 | Tim Thomas | 6 ft 10 in (2.08 m) | 240 lb (109 kg) | 1977–02–26 | Villanova |

Coaches
Head coach
- George Karl
Assistant(s)
- Ron Adams
- Mike McNeive
- Don Newman
- Terry Stotts
- Mike Thibault

Legend
- (DP) Unsigned draft pick
- (FA) Free agent
- (S) Suspended
- Injured

Roster

== Regular season ==
=== Season standings ===
| Central Division | W | L | PCT | GB | Home | Road | Div |
|---|---|---|---|---|---|---|---|
| y-Detroit Pistons | 50 | 32 | .610 | – | 26–15 | 24–17 | 20–8 |
| x-Charlotte Hornets | 44 | 38 | .537 | 6 | 21–20 | 23–18 | 17–11 |
| x-Toronto Raptors | 42 | 40 | .512 | 8 | 24–17 | 18–23 | 17–11 |
| x-Indiana Pacers | 42 | 40 | .512 | 8 | 25–16 | 17–24 | 13–15 |
| e-Milwaukee Bucks | 41 | 41 | .500 | 9 | 25–16 | 16–25 | 17–11 |
| e-Atlanta Hawks | 33 | 49 | .402 | 17 | 23–18 | 10–31 | 11–17 |
| e-Cleveland Cavaliers | 29 | 53 | .354 | 21 | 20–21 | 9–32 | 12–16 |
| e-Chicago Bulls | 21 | 61 | .256 | 29 | 14–27 | 7–34 | 5–23 |

| # | Eastern Conference | | | | |
| # | Team | W | L | PCT | GB |
|---|---|---|---|---|---|
| 1 | c-New Jersey Nets | 52 | 30 | .634 | – |
| 2 | y-Detroit Pistons | 50 | 32 | .610 | 2 |
| 3 | x-Boston Celtics | 49 | 33 | .598 | 3 |
| 4 | x-Charlotte Hornets | 44 | 38 | .537 | 8 |
| 5 | x-Orlando Magic | 44 | 38 | .537 | 8 |
| 6 | x-Philadelphia 76ers | 43 | 39 | .524 | 9 |
| 7 | x-Toronto Raptors | 42 | 40 | .512 | 10 |
| 8 | x-Indiana Pacers | 42 | 40 | .512 | 10 |
| 9 | e-Milwaukee Bucks | 41 | 41 | .500 | 11 |
| 10 | e-Washington Wizards | 37 | 45 | .451 | 15 |
| 11 | e-Miami Heat | 36 | 46 | .439 | 16 |
| 12 | e-Atlanta Hawks | 33 | 49 | .402 | 19 |
| 13 | e-New York Knicks | 30 | 52 | .366 | 22 |
| 14 | e-Cleveland Cavaliers | 29 | 53 | .354 | 23 |
| 15 | e-Chicago Bulls | 21 | 61 | .256 | 31 |

c – clinched home field advantage throughout conference playoffs
y – clinched division title
x – clinched playoff spot

=== Game log ===
2001–02 game log
Total: 41–41 (Home: 25–16; Road: 16–25)
October: 1–0 (home: 0–0; road: 1–0)

| Game | Date | Team | Score | High points | High rebounds | High assists | Location Attendance | Record |
|---|---|---|---|---|---|---|---|---|
| 1 | October 30, 2001 | @ Utah | W 119—112 | | | | Delta Center; 18,845 | 1–0 |

November: 8–4 (home: 5–1; road: 3–3)

| Game | Date | Team | Score | High points | High rebounds | High assists | Location Attendance | Record |
|---|---|---|---|---|---|---|---|---|
| 2 | November 1, 2001 | @ Denver | W 102—101 | | | | Pepsi Center; 18,634 | 2–0 |
| 3 | November 3, 2001 | Boston | W 105–99 | | | | Bradley Center; 18,171 | 3–0 |
| 4 | November 8, 2001 | Miami | W 86–82 | | | | Bradley Center; 18,364 | 4–0 |
| 5 | November 10, 2001 | Minnesota | L 82–98 | | | | Bradley Center; 18,717 | 4–1 |
| 6 | November 14, 2001 | @ Washington | W 107–98 | | | | MCI Center; 20,674 | 5–1 |
| 7 | November 17, 2001 | Utah | W 104–93 | | | | Bradley Center; 18,717 | 6–1 |
| 8 | November 21, 2001 | Chicago | W 95–79 | | | | Bradley Center; 18,717 | 7–1 |
| 9 | November 22, 2001 | @ Toronto | W 107–98 | | | | Air Canada Centre; 19,800 | 8–1 |
| 10 | November 24, 2001 | Atlanta | W 95–88 | | | | Bradley Center; 18,717 | 9–1 |
| 11 | November 27, 2001 | @ L. A. Lakers | L 85–104 | | | | STAPLES Center; 18,997 | 9–2 |
| 12 | November 28, 2001 | @ Phoenix | L 84–104 | | | | America West Arena; 15,590 | 9–3 |
| 13 | November 30, 2001 | @ Portland | L 95–101 | | | | Rose Garden; 18,723 | 9–4 |

December: 8–6 (home: 4–1; road: 4–5)

| Game | Date | Team | Score | High points | High rebounds | High assists | Location Attendance | Record |
|---|---|---|---|---|---|---|---|---|
| 14 | December 2, 2001 | @ Seattle | L 83–97 | | | | Key Arena; 13,595 | 9–5 |
| 15 | December 4, 2001 | New York | L 71–85 | | | | Bradley Center; 17,416 | 9–6 |
| 16 | December 6, 2001 | Toronto | W 95–89 | | | | Bradley Center; 18,717 | 10–6 |
| 17 | December 8, 2001 | New Jersey | W 95–79 | | | | Bradley Center; 18,171 | 11–6 |
| 18 | December 11, 2001 | @ Miami | L 97–99 | | | | AmericanAirlines Arena; 15,321 | 11–7 |
| 19 | December 14, 2001 | @ Philadelphia | W 96–80 | | | | First Union Center; 20,641 | 12–7 |
| 20 | December 15, 2001 | Indiana | W 115–95 | | | | Bradley Center; 18,717 | 13–7 |
| 21 | December 18, 2001 | @ Memphis | W 114–105 | | | | Pyramid Arena; 12,476 | 14–7 |
| 22 | December 20, 2001 | @ Dallas | L 101—113 | | | | American Airlines Center; 19,780 | 14–8 |
| 23 | December 22, 2001 | @ Houston | L 110—115 | | | | Compaq Center; 11,628 | 14–9 |
| 24 | December 23, 2001 | @ San Antonio | W 101—91 | | | | Alamodome; 24,708 | 15–9 |
| 25 | December 26, 2001 | Atlanta | W 107—97 | | | | Bradley Center; 18,717 | 16–9 |
| 26 | December 28, 2001 | @ Charlotte | W 107—97 | | | | Charlotte Coliseum; 10,888 | 17–9 |
| 27 | December 29, 2001 | San Antonio | W 107—97 | | | | Bradley Center; 18,717 | 18–9 |
| 28 | December 31, 2001 | @ Chicago | L 83—90 | | | | United Center; 17,167 | 18–10 |

January: 0–2 (home: 0–2; road: 0–0)

| Game | Date | Team | Score | High points | High rebounds | High assists | Location Attendance | Record |
|---|---|---|---|---|---|---|---|---|
| 29 | January 2, 2002 | @ Minnesota | L 77—95 | | | | Target Center; 19,497 | 18–11 |
| 30 | January 5, 2002 | @ L. A. Clippers | L 83—86 | | | | STAPLES Center; 19,232 | 18–12 |
| 31 | January 6, 2002 | @ Sacramento | L 101—115 | | | | ARCO Arena (II); 17,317 | 18–13 |
| 32 | January 8, 2002 | @ Golden State | W 113—97 | | | | The Arena in Oakland; 14,011 | 19–13 |
| 33 | January 11, 2002 | Washington | W 105—86 | | | | Bradley Center; 18,717 | 20–13 |
| 40 | January 22, 2002 | Phoenix | L 81–92 | | | | Bradley Center; 17,036 | 26–14 |
| 41 | January 24, 2002 | Seattle | L 88–99 | | | | Bradley Center; 16,659 | 26–15 |

February: 1–0 (home: 1–0; road: 0–0)

| Game | Date | Team | Score | High points | High rebounds | High assists | Location Attendance | Record |
|---|---|---|---|---|---|---|---|---|
| 46 | February 7, 2002 | Memphis | W 107–103 | | | | Bradley Center; 17,726 | 28–18 |

March: 0–2 (home: 0–1; road: 0–1)

| Game | Date | Team | Score | High points | High rebounds | High assists | Location Attendance | Record |
|---|---|---|---|---|---|---|---|---|
| 65 | March 18, 2002 | @ Charlotte | L 110—113 | | | | Charlotte Coliseum; 7,883 | 36–29 |
| 69 | March 26, 2002 | Dallas | L 106–112 OT | | | | Bradley Center; 18,465 | 37–32 |

April: 0–0 (home: 0–0; road: 0–0)

| Game | Date | Team | Score | High points | High rebounds | High assists | Location Attendance | Record |

2001–02 schedule

== Player statistics ==
Legend
| GP | Games played | GS | Games started | MPG | Minutes per game |
| FG% | Field-goal percentage | 3P% | 3-point field-goal percentage | FT% | Free-throw percentage |
| RPG | Rebounds per game | APG | Assists per game | SPG | Steals per game |
| BPG | Blocks per game | PPG | Points per game |

| Player | GP | GS | MPG | FG% | 3FG% | FT% | RPG | APG | SPG | BPG | PPG |
|---|---|---|---|---|---|---|---|---|---|---|---|
| Ray Allen | 69 | 67 | 36.6 | 46.2 | 43.4 | 87.3 | 4.5 | 3.9 | 1.3 | 0.3 | 21.8 |
| Glenn Robinson | 66 | 63 | 35.5 | 46.7 | 32.6 | 83.7 | 6.2 | 2.5 | 1.5 | 0.6 | 20.7 |
| Sam Cassell | 74 | 73 | 35.2 | 46.3 | 34.8 | 86.0 | 4.2 | 6.7 | 1.2 | 0.2 | 19.7 |
| Tim Thomas | 74 | 22 | 26.9 | 42.0 | 32.6 | 79.3 | 4.1 | 1.4 | 0.9 | 0.4 | 11.7 |
| Michael Redd | 67 | 8 | 21.1 | 48.3 | 44.4 | 79.1 | 3.3 | 1.4 | 0.6 | 0.1 | 11.4 |
| Anthony Mason | 82 | 82 | 38.3 | 50.5 | 100.0 | 69.7 | 7.9 | 4.2 | 0.7 | 0.3 | 9.6 |
| Greg Anthony | 24 | 3 | 23.0 | 37.2 | 26.0 | 61.9 | 1.8 | 3.3 | 1.2 | 0.0 | 7.2 |
| Darvin Ham | 70 | 2 | 17.3 | 56.9 | 14.3 | 50.4 | 2.9 | 1.0 | 0.4 | 0.5 | 4.3 |
| Jason Caffey | 23 | 0 | 12.3 | 50.0 | 0.0 | 62.8 | 2.2 | 0.5 | 0.2 | 0.2 | 4.3 |
| Rafer Alston | 50 | 7 | 12.0 | 34.6 | 38.0 | 62.1 | 1.4 | 2.9 | 0.6 | 0.0 | 3.5 |
| Joel Przybilla | 71 | 62 | 15.9 | 53.5 | 0.0 | 42.2 | 4.0 | 0.3 | 0.3 | 1.7 | 2.7 |
| Ervin Johnson | 81 | 9 | 20.5 | 46.1 | 0.0 | 45.5 | 5.8 | 0.3 | 0.5 | 1.0 | 2.6 |
| Mark Pope | 45 | 12 | 9.5 | 39.6 | 16.0 | 52.4 | 1.6 | 0.4 | 0.2 | 0.2 | 1.9 |
| Greg Foster | 6 | 0 | 4.0 | 22.2 | 0.0 | 75.0 | 1.3 | 0.2 | 0.0 | 0.0 | 1.2 |

Player statistics citation:

== Transactions ==
=== Trades ===
June 28, 2001
To Milwaukee Bucks

Greg Foster
To Los Angeles Lakers

Lindsey Hunter
October 22, 2001
To Milwaukee Bucks
- Kevin Willis
- Aleksandar Radojevic
To Denver Nuggets
- Scott Williams
October 22, 2001
To Milwaukee Bucks----
- 2002 2nd round pick (Dan Gadzuric)
To Houston Rockets----
- Kevin Willis

=== Free agents ===
| Player | Signed | Former team |
| Anthony Mason | October 25, 2001 | Miami Heat |
| Greg Anthony | March 5, 2002 | Chicago Bulls |

Player Transactions Citation:

== See also ==
- 2001–02 NBA season
