= 2001–02 Miami Heat season =

NBA professional basketball team season

- Head coach: Pat Riley
- President: Pat Riley
- General manager: Randy Pfund
- Owner: Micky Arison
- Arena: American Airlines Arena

Results
- Record: 36–46 (.439)
- Place: Division: 6th (Atlantic); Conference: 11th (Eastern)
- Playoff finish: Did not qualify
- Stats at Basketball Reference

Local media
- Television: Sunshine Network; WBFS; WFOR
- Radio: WIOD

The 2001–02 Miami Heat season was the 14th season for the Miami Heat in the National Basketball Association.

== Season summary ==
=== Off-season ===
During the off-season, the Heat re-acquired Chris Gatling from the Cleveland Cavaliers in a three-team trade; Gatling previously played for the Heat during the second half of the 1995–96 season. The team also signed free agents Rod Strickland, LaPhonso Ellis, Kendall Gill, then later on signed Jim Jackson in December.

For the season, the Heat revealed new red alternate road uniforms, which featured the city name "Miami" in white letters on the front of their jerseys. The uniforms also featured a black trim, black side panels with golden yellow outlines and white inlines on their jerseys and shorts, and the team's primary logo on the right leg of their shorts. The team's new alternate uniforms would remain in use until 2010, while the shorts would be slightly redesigned in 2009.

=== Regular season ===
Despite the addition of Strickland and Ellis, and with the return of Alonzo Mourning after dealing with a kidney disorder the previous season, the Heat struggled and lost 23 of their first 28 games of the regular season, which included a 12-game losing streak between November and December. The team soon recovered from their awful start, and played above .500 in winning percentage for the remainder of the season, winning nine of their next twelve games, and holding an 18–29 record at the All-Star break. However, the Heat finished in sixth place in the Atlantic Division with a 36–46 record, and failed to qualify for the NBA playoffs for the first time since the 1994–95 season.

Eddie Jones averaged 18.3 points, 4.7 rebounds and 1.4 steals per game, and led the Heat with 149 three-point field goals, while Mourning averaged 15.7 points, 8.4 rebounds and 2.5 blocks per game, and Jackson played a sixth man role off the bench, providing the team with 10.7 points and 5.3 rebounds per game. In addition, Strickland contributed 10.4 points and 6.1 assists per game, while Brian Grant provided with 9.3 points and 8.0 rebounds per game, and second-year guard Eddie House contributed 8.0 points per game. Meanwhile, Ellis averaged 7.1 points and 4.3 rebounds per game, Gatling provided with 6.4 points and 3.8 rebounds per game, Gill contributed 5.7 points per game, and Anthony Carter provided with 4.3 points and 4.6 assists per game.

During the NBA All-Star weekend at the First Union Center in Philadelphia, Pennsylvania, Mourning was selected for the 2002 NBA All-Star Game, as a member of the Eastern Conference All-Star team; it was his final All-Star appearance. The Heat finished 19th in the NBA in home-game attendance, with an attendance of 655,549 at the American Airlines Arena during the regular season.

=== Aftermath ===
This season also proved to be Mourning's final season with the Heat, and although he was on the roster the following season, he was unable to play due to another kidney condition; he would eventually return to the Heat midway through the 2004–05 season after a brief stint with the New Jersey Nets. This season also marked the first time in Pat Riley's coaching career that he failed to get his team into the NBA playoffs. Following the season, Gill signed as a free agent with the Minnesota Timberwolves, while Jackson signed with the Sacramento Kings during the next season, Strickland was released to free agency, and Gatling retired.

== Offseason ==
=== Draft picks ===
Round	Pick	Player	Position	Nationality	School/Club team
2	48	Ken Johnson	C	United States	Ohio State

== Roster ==
2001–02 Miami Heat roster
Players

Pos.	No.	Player	Height	Weight	DOB	From
F	35	Malik Allen	6 ft 10 in (2.08 m)	255 lb (116 kg)	1978–06–27	Villanova
C	52	Ernest Brown	7 ft 0 in (2.13 m)	244 lb (111 kg)	1979–05–17	Indian Hills CC
G	25	Anthony Carter	6 ft 1 in (1.85 m)	190 lb (86 kg)	1975–06–16	Hawaiʻi
F	3	LaPhonso Ellis	6 ft 8 in (2.03 m)	240 lb (109 kg)	1970–05–05	Notre Dame
F	15	Chris Gatling	6 ft 10 in (2.08 m)	220 lb (100 kg)	1967–09–03	Old Dominion
G/F	13	Kendall Gill	6 ft 5 in (1.96 m)	195 lb (88 kg)	1968–05–25	Illinois
F/C	44	Brian Grant	6 ft 9 in (2.06 m)	254 lb (115 kg)	1972–03–05	Xavier
G	5	Eddie House	6 ft 1 in (1.85 m)	180 lb (82 kg)	1978–05–14	Arizona State
G/F	24	Jim Jackson	6 ft 6 in (1.98 m)	220 lb (100 kg)	1970–10–14	Ohio State
G	12	Mike James	6 ft 2 in (1.88 m)	188 lb (85 kg)	1975–06–23	Duquesne
G/F	6	Eddie Jones	6 ft 6 in (1.98 m)	190 lb (86 kg)	1971–10–20	Temple
F/C	22	Sean Marks	6 ft 10 in (2.08 m)	250 lb (113 kg)	1975–08–23	California
C	33	Alonzo Mourning	6 ft 10 in (2.08 m)	240 lb (109 kg)	1970–02–08	Georgetown
C	50	Vladimir Stepania	7 ft 0 in (2.13 m)	236 lb (107 kg)	1976–05–08	Republic of Georgia
G	1	Rod Strickland	6 ft 3 in (1.91 m)	175 lb (79 kg)	1966–07–11	DePaul

Coaches
Head coach
- Pat Riley
Assistant(s)
- Keith Askins
- Bill Foran
- Marc Iavaroni
- Bob McAdoo
- Erik Spoelstra
- Stan Van Gundy

Legend
- (DP) Unsigned draft pick
- (FA) Free agent
- (S) Suspended
- Injured

Roster
Updated: December 18, 2001

== Regular season ==
=== Season standings ===
Atlantic Division	W	L	PCT	GB	Home	Road	Div
y-New Jersey Nets	52	30	.634	–	33–8	19–22	16–8
x-Boston Celtics	49	33	.598	3	27–14	22–19	17–7
x-Orlando Magic	44	38	.537	8	27–14	17–24	12–12
x-Philadelphia 76ers	43	39	.524	9	22–19	21–20	14–11
e-Washington Wizards	37	45	.451	15	22–19	15–26	12–13
e-Miami Heat	36	46	.439	16	18–23	18–23	10–14
e-New York Knicks	30	52	.366	22	19–22	11–30	4–20

#	Eastern Conference				
#	Team	W	L	PCT	GB
1	c-New Jersey Nets	52	30	.634	–
2	y-Detroit Pistons	50	32	.610	2
3	x-Boston Celtics	49	33	.598	3
4	x-Charlotte Hornets	44	38	.537	8
5	x-Orlando Magic	44	38	.537	8
6	x-Philadelphia 76ers	43	39	.524	9
7	x-Toronto Raptors	42	40	.512	10
8	x-Indiana Pacers	42	40	.512	10
9	e-Milwaukee Bucks	41	41	.500	11
10	e-Washington Wizards	37	45	.451	15
11	e-Miami Heat	36	46	.439	16
12	e-Atlanta Hawks	33	49	.402	19
13	e-New York Knicks	30	52	.366	22
14	e-Cleveland Cavaliers	29	53	.354	23
15	e-Chicago Bulls	21	61	.256	31

== Player statistics ==
=== Ragular season ===
Player	POS	GP	GS	MP	REB	AST	STL	BLK	PTS	MPG	RPG	APG	SPG	BPG	PPG
Eddie Jones	SG	81	81	3,156	378	262	117	77	1,480	39.0	4.7	3.2	1.4	1.0	18.3
Rod Strickland	PG	76	64	2,294	232	463	82	11	794	30.2	3.1	6.1	1.1	.1	10.4
Alonzo Mourning	C	75	74	2,455	632	87	27	186	1,178	32.7	8.4	1.2	.4	2.5	15.7
Brian Grant	PF	72	72	2,256	575	137	48	31	673	31.3	8.0	1.9	.7	.4	9.3
Vladimir Stepania	C	67	4	884	270	16	24	44	285	13.2	4.0	.2	.4	.7	4.3
LaPhonso Ellis	SF	66	14	1,684	287	56	30	37	469	25.5	4.3	.8	.5	.6	7.1
Kendall Gill	SG	65	49	1,410	184	100	44	8	372	21.7	2.8	1.5	.7	.1	5.7
Eddie House	PG	64	3	1,230	110	123	43	5	514	19.2	1.7	1.9	.7	.1	8.0
Jim Jackson	SF	55	19	1,825	290	140	42	14	589	33.2	5.3	2.5	.8	.3	10.7
Chris Gatling	PF	54	1	809	206	25	17	11	345	15.0	3.8	.5	.3	.2	6.4
Anthony Carter	PG	46	18	1,050	117	214	50	3	198	22.8	2.5	4.7	1.1	.1	4.3
Sean Marks	C	21	6	319	75	8	5	10	96	15.2	3.6	.4	.2	.5	4.6
Mike James	PG	15	0	119	14	19	6	1	42	7.9	.9	1.3	.4	.1	2.8
Malik Allen	PF	12	2	161	38	5	3	8	52	13.4	3.2	.4	.3	.7	4.3
Sam Mack	SF	12	1	159	14	4	5	1	40	13.3	1.2	.3	.4	.1	3.3
Tang Hamilton	SF	9	2	98	18	5	4	0	20	10.9	2.0	.6	.4	.0	2.2
Ernest Brown	C	3	0	21	6	0	0	1	3	7.0	2.0	.0	.0	.3	1.0
