= Norman Richardson (basketball) =

American basketball player and coach (born 1979)

Cleveland Charge
- Title: Associate Head Coach
- League: NBA G League

Personal information
- Born: July 24, 1979 (age 47) Brooklyn, New York, U.S.
- Listed height: 6 ft 5 in (1.96 m)
- Listed weight: 190 lb (86 kg)

Career information
- High school: Grady (Brooklyn, New York)
- College: Hofstra (1997–2001)
- NBA draft: 2001: undrafted
- Playing career: 2001–2010
- Position: Shooting guard
- Number: 21, 31
- Coaching career: 2012–present

Career history

Playing
- 2001–2002: Indiana Pacers
- 2002: Chicago Bulls
- 2002–2003: Scavolini Pesaro
- 2003: North Charleston Lowgators
- 2003–2004: KK Crvena zvezda
- 2004: Guaiqueríes de Margarita
- 2005–2005: Fayetteville Patriots
- 2006: Paris Basket Racing
- 2006–2007: Cholet Basket
- 2007: Boca Juniors
- 2007–2008: Polonia Warsaw
- 2008–2009: TBB Trier
- 2009–2010: Eisbären Bremerhaven

Coaching
- 2012–2014: TSV/Bietigheim
- 2016–2017: Erie BayHawks (assistant)
- 2017–2020: Fort Wayne Mad Ants (assistant)
- 2021–2024: Charlotte Hornets (assistant)
- 2026–present: Cleveland Charge (associate)

Career highlights
- America East Player of the Year (2001); AP Honorable mention All-American (2001); First-team All-America East (2001); 2× Second-team All-America East (1999, 2000)
- Stats at NBA.com
- Stats at Basketball Reference

Charles Norman Richardson (born July 24, 1979) is an American former professional basketball player and currently working as an associate head coach for the Cleveland Charge of the NBA G League. A 6'5" 195 lb shooting guard, he played college basketball for the Hofstra Pride, and had a brief stint in the National Basketball Association (NBA) in 2001-02.

== Career ==
Richardson was signed by the Indiana Pacers as a free agent on September 21, 2001, for whom he played 3 games before being traded, along with Jalen Rose, Travis Best, and a second-round draft pick to the Chicago Bulls in exchange for Ron Mercer, Ron Artest, Brad Miller, and Kevin Ollie at the trade deadline on February 19, 2002. With the Pacers, Richardson wore jersey number 21 and with the Bulls number 31.

Richardson only played 11 games in the NBA, playing very sporadically in the 2nd half of the 2001–02 season with the Pacers. In his 11 games, Richardson averaged 2.7 points. His final game was on April 17, 2002, in a 106 - 112 loss to the New Orleans Hornets where he played for 6 minutes and the only stat he recorded was 1 rebound.

After the 2001–02 NBA season, Richardson played with the team Scavolini Pesaro of the Italian Lega Basket Serie A. He wore jersey number 7. The North Charleston Lowgators of the NBA Development League signed Richardson on January 28, 2003, and waived Richardson on February 21, 2003. With the Lowgators, Richardson played eight games and averaged 6.4 points, 1.9 rebounds, and 1.1 assists each game. He wore #31.

In March 2004, Richardson signed with the team Guaiqueríes de Margarita of the Venezuelan LPB. In his first game with, Richardson scored 15 points, but his team lost.

During the 2005–06 NBA season, Richardson played in the D-League team Fayetteville Patriots with jersey number 20.

In March 2007, Richardson played three games with the Argentine team Boca Juniors before being released due to injury.

Later he played for Polonia Warsaw (Polen first division) and for TBB Trier (Germany first division) in the 2008/2009 season. With Polonia, Richardson wore jersey #12. With TBB Trier, Richardson wore jersey #31.

== Coaching career ==
On October 20, 2016, Richardson joined the Erie BayHawks as an assistant coach.

On September 27, 2017, Richardson joined the Fort Wayne Mad Ants as an assistant coach.

On September 15, 2024, Richardson joined the Cold Hearts as head coach.
