= Ron Mercer =

American basketball player (born 1976)

Personal information
- Born: May 18, 1976 (age 50) Nashville, Tennessee, U.S.
- Listed height: 6 ft 7 in (2.01 m)
- Listed weight: 215 lb (98 kg)

Career information
- High school: Goodpasture Christian (Madison, Tennessee); Oak Hill Academy (Mouth of Wilson, Virginia)
- College: Kentucky (1995–1997)
- NBA draft: 1997: 1st round, 6th overall pick
- Drafted by: Boston Celtics
- Playing career: 1997–2005
- Position: Small forward / shooting guard
- Number: 5, 33, 1

Career history
- 1997–1999: Boston Celtics
- 1999–2000: Denver Nuggets
- 2000: Orlando Magic
- 2000–2002: Chicago Bulls
- 2002–2003: Indiana Pacers
- 2003–2004: San Antonio Spurs
- 2004–2005: New Jersey Nets

Career highlights
- NBA All-Rookie First Team (1998); NCAA champion (1996); Consensus first-team All-American (1997); SEC Player of the Year (1997); Naismith Prep Player of the Year (1995); McDonald's All-American (1995); 2× First-team Parade All-American (1994, 1995); 2× Tennessee Mr. Basketball (1993, 1994)

Career NBA statistics
- Points: 5,892 (13.6 ppg)
- Rebounds: 1,342 (3.1 rpg)
- Assists: 921 (2.1 apg)
- Stats at NBA.com
- Stats at Basketball Reference

Ronald Eugene Mercer (born May 18, 1976) is an American former professional basketball player. After his career at the University of Kentucky, Mercer played for several teams in the National Basketball Association (NBA); he ended his career with the New Jersey Nets in 2005.

== Basketball career ==
=== Early years ===
Ron Mercer was twice named "Mr. Basketball" of Tennessee while at Goodpasture Christian School in Madison, Tennessee. He then transferred to Oak Hill Academy in Mouth of Wilson, Virginia, and was rated by Bob Gibbons to be the best prep player of the class of 1995.

=== University of Kentucky ===
Mercer had a very successful collegiate career, having been an All-American and all-Southeastern Conference player at Kentucky, and part of a national championship team his freshman year.

=== NBA ===
==== Boston Celtics ====
Mercer was selected with the sixth overall pick of the 1997 NBA draft by the Boston Celtics and was reunited with fellow Kentucky teammate Antoine Walker, and Rick Pitino, his coach at Kentucky who had just become the coach of the Celtics. Prior to Mercer's drafting, Pitino was recorded as saying that he did not envisage Mercer as having the necessary talent to be selected very high. Some felt this was just a ploy to scare the other teams away from him so as to increase the likelihood of Mercer being available by the time the Celtics got an opportunity to make their draft selection. It turned out it was.

==== Denver Nuggets and Orlando Magic ====
After two seasons in Boston, Mercer was traded by the Celtics along with Popeye Jones and Dwayne Schintzius to the Denver Nuggets for Danny Fortson, Eric Williams, Eric Washington, and a future draft choice. He played 37 games for Denver in 1999–2000, then played the final 31 games that season with the Orlando Magic due to a trade.

==== Chicago Bulls ====
Mercer left after that season, signing as a free agent with the Chicago Bulls the next year. He averaged 19.7 points per game in his first year with them.

This was Mercer's career high in points per game and he was the second leading scorer on the team.

==== Indiana Pacers ====
Despite Mercer's 16.8 points per game in 2001–02, he was traded midway through the season alongside Brad Miller, Ron Artest, and Kevin Ollie to the Indiana Pacers for Jalen Rose, Travis Best, Norman Richardson, and a second-round draft pick. In Indiana, he served merely as a reserve player and his play declined rapidly over his one-and-a-half-season stint with the club.

==== San Antonio Spurs ====
Before the 2003–04 season, Mercer was traded to the San Antonio Spurs in a three-team trade that again involved Brad Miller and the Sacramento Kings' Hedo Türkoğlu. After playing 39 games with the Spurs, he was released.

==== New Jersey Nets ====
Prior to the 2004–05 season, Mercer signed with his seventh NBA team, the New Jersey Nets. On August 15, 2005, prior to the 2005–06 NBA season, he was waived by the Nets to avoid the league's luxury tax as part of the new labor agreement.

== Rape allegation ==
In 1997, Mercer and fellow former Celtic player Chauncey Billups were accused of raping a woman at the home of teammate Antoine Walker. According to a civil suit, Billups, Mercer, and Walker's roommate Michael Irvin raped the woman at Walker's condo after leaving a Boston comedy club on November 9, 1997. A medical examination on the following day revealed injuries consistent with the victim's testimony. No criminal charges were filed, but Billups and Mercer settled a civil suit in 2000.
