= 2001–02 San Antonio Spurs season =

- Division champions
- Head coach: Gregg Popovich
- President: Gregg Popovich (vice)
- General manager: Gregg Popovich
- Owner: Peter Holt
- Arena: Alamodome

Results
- Record: 58–24 (.707)
- Place: Division: 1st (Midwest); Conference: 2nd (Western)
- Playoff finish: Conference semifinals (lost to Lakers 1–4)
- Stats at Basketball Reference

Local media
- Television: Fox Sports Net Southwest, KENS, KRRT
- Radio: KLEY

The 2001–02 San Antonio Spurs season was the 26th season for the San Antonio Spurs in the National Basketball Association, their 29th season in San Antonio, Texas, and their 35th season as a franchise.

== Season summary ==
=== Off-season ===
During the off-season, the Spurs acquired Steve Smith from the Portland Trail Blazers, and signed free agents Bruce Bowen, second-year guard Stephen Jackson, and Charles Smith. The team also selected point guard, and French basketball star Tony Parker with the 28th overall pick in the 2001 NBA draft.

=== Regular season ===
With the addition of Steve Smith, Parker and Bowen, the Spurs won 20 of their first 24 games of the regular season, which included a 10-game winning streak in December, and later on held a 31–17 record at the All-Star break. The Spurs posted a 13-game winning streak in March and won their final nine games of the season, finishing in first place in the Midwest Division with a 58–24 record, and earning the second seed in the Western Conference. The team qualified for the NBA playoffs for the fifth consecutive year.

Tim Duncan averaged 25.5 points, 12.7 rebounds, 3.7 assists and 2.5 blocks per game, as he was named the NBA Most Valuable Player of the Year, joining David Robinson as the only Spurs players to win the award; Duncan was also named to the All-NBA First Team, and to the NBA All-Defensive First Team. In addition, Robinson averaged 12.2 points, 8.3 rebounds and 1.8 blocks per game, while Steve Smith contributed 11.6 points per game, and led the Spurs with 116 three-point field goals, while shooting .472 in three-point field-goal percentage, and Parker provided the team with 9.2 points and 4.3 assists per game, and was named to the NBA All-Rookie First Team. Meanwhile, Malik Rose averaged 9.4 points and 6.0 rebounds per game, Antonio Daniels provided with 9.2 points per game, and Charles Smith contributed 7.4 points per game, Bowen contributed 7.0 points per game, and was named to the NBA All-Defensive Second Team, Terry Porter provided with 5.5 points and 2.8 assists per game, and Danny Ferry averaged 4.6 points per game.

During the NBA All-Star weekend at the First Union Center in Philadelphia, Pennsylvania, Duncan was selected for the 2002 NBA All-Star Game, as a member of the Western Conference All-Star team. Meanwhile, Steve Smith participated in the NBA Three-Point Shootout, and Parker was selected for the NBA Rookie Challenge Game, as a member of the Rookies team. Rose finished in fourth place in Sixth Man of the Year voting.

The Spurs led the NBA in home-game attendance, with an attendance of 906,390 at the Alamodome during the regular season.

=== NBA playoffs ===
In the Western Conference First Round of the 2002 NBA playoffs, the Spurs faced off against the 7th–seeded Seattle SuperSonics, a team that featured All-Star guard Gary Payton, Rashard Lewis and Brent Barry. The Spurs won Game 1 over the SuperSonics at home, 110–89 at the Alamodome, but then lost Game 2 at home by a score of 98–90, as the SuperSonics evened the series. The Spurs managed to win Game 3 over the SuperSonics on the road, 102–75 at the KeyArena at Seattle Center, before losing Game 4 on the road by a score of 91–79; neither Duncan or Robinson played in Game 4, as Duncan flew back home to the Virgin Islands to attend his father's funeral, while Robinson was out due to injury. With the series tied at 2–2, the Spurs won Game 5 over the SuperSonics at the Alamodome, 101–78 to win in a hard-fought five-game series.

In the Western Conference Semi-finals, and for the second consecutive year, the team faced off against the 3rd–seeded, and 2-time defending NBA champion Los Angeles Lakers, who were led by All-Star center Shaquille O'Neal, All-Star guard Kobe Bryant, and Derek Fisher. Despite both teams finishing with the same regular-season record, and the Spurs winning the Midwest Division title, the Lakers had home-court advantage in the series. The Spurs lost Game 1 to the Lakers on the road, 86–80 at the Staples Center, but managed to win Game 2 on the road, 88–85 to even the series. However, the Spurs lost their next two home games at the Alamodome, before losing Game 5 to the Lakers at the Staples Center, 93–87, thus losing the series in five games.

The Lakers would go on to defeat the New Jersey Nets in a four-game sweep in the 2002 NBA Finals, winning their third consecutive NBA championship.

=== Aftermath ===
This was also the Spurs' final season in which they played their home games at the Alamodome; the team moved into their brand new arena known as the SBC Center the following season. Meanwhile, Daniels and Charles Smith were both traded to the Portland Trail Blazers, and Porter retired after seventeen seasons in the NBA.

== Draft picks ==
Round	Pick	Player	Position	Nationality	College
1	28	Tony Parker	PG	France	
2	55	Robertas Javtokas	C	Lithuania	
2	57	Bryan Bracey	F	United States	Oregon

== Roster ==
2001–02 San Antonio Spurs roster
Players

Pos.	No.	Player	Height	Weight	DOB	From
F	12	Bruce Bowen	6 ft 7 in (2.01 m)	200 lb (91 kg)	1971–06–14	Cal State Fullerton
F	2	Mark Bryant	6 ft 9 in (2.06 m)	245 lb (111 kg)	1965–04–25	Seton Hall
G	33	Antonio Daniels	6 ft 4 in (1.93 m)	195 lb (88 kg)	1975–03–19	Bowling Green
F/C	21	Tim Duncan	6 ft 11 in (2.11 m)	255 lb (116 kg)	1976–04–25	Wake Forest
F	35	Danny Ferry	6 ft 10 in (2.08 m)	235 lb (107 kg)	1966–10–17	Duke
G	1	Jason Hart	6 ft 3 in (1.91 m)	180 lb (82 kg)	1978–04–29	Syracuse
G/F	3	Stephen Jackson (injured)	6 ft 8 in (2.03 m)	220 lb (100 kg)	1978–04–05	Butler CC
C	15	Amal McCaskill	6 ft 11 in (2.11 m)	244 lb (111 kg)	1973–10–28	Marquette
G	9	Tony Parker	6 ft 2 in (1.88 m)	185 lb (84 kg)	1982–05–17	France
C	18	Cherokee Parks	6 ft 11 in (2.11 m)	240 lb (109 kg)	1972–10–11	Duke
G	30	Terry Porter	6 ft 3 in (1.91 m)	195 lb (88 kg)	1963–04–08	UW–Stevens Point
C	50	David Robinson	7 ft 1 in (2.16 m)	235 lb (107 kg)	1965–08–06	Navy
F	31	Malik Rose	6 ft 7 in (2.01 m)	250 lb (113 kg)	1974–11–23	Drexel
G	5	Charles Smith	6 ft 4 in (1.93 m)	194 lb (88 kg)	1975–08–22	New Mexico
G	8	Steve Smith	6 ft 7 in (2.01 m)	200 lb (91 kg)	1969–03–31	Michigan State

Coaches
Head coach
- Gregg Popovich
Assistant(s)
- Mike Brown
- Mike Budenholzer
- Hank Egan
- Joe Prunty

Legend
- (DP) Unsigned draft pick
- (FA) Free agent
- (S) Suspended
- Injured

Roster

== Regular season ==
=== Season standings ===
Midwest Division	W	L	PCT	GB	Home	Road	Div
y-San Antonio Spurs	58	24	.707	–	32–9	26–15	21–3
x-Dallas Mavericks	57	25	.695	1	30–11	27–14	16–8
x-Minnesota Timberwolves	50	32	.610	8	29–12	21–20	15–9
x-Utah Jazz	44	38	.537	14	25–16	19–22	8–16
e-Houston Rockets	28	54	.341	30	18–23	10–31	9–15
e-Denver Nuggets	27	55	.329	31	20–21	7–34	8–16
e-Memphis Grizzlies	23	59	.280	35	15–26	8–33	7–17

#	Western Conference				
#	Team	W	L	PCT	GB
1	z-Sacramento Kings	61	21	.744	–
2	y-San Antonio Spurs	58	24	.707	3
3	x-Los Angeles Lakers	58	24	.707	3
4	x-Dallas Mavericks	57	25	.695	4
5	x-Minnesota Timberwolves	50	32	.610	11
6	x-Portland Trail Blazers	49	33	.598	12
7	x-Seattle SuperSonics	45	37	.549	16
8	x-Utah Jazz	44	38	.537	17
9	e-Los Angeles Clippers	39	43	.476	22
10	e-Phoenix Suns	36	46	.439	25
11	e-Houston Rockets	28	54	.341	33
12	e-Denver Nuggets	27	55	.329	34
13	e-Memphis Grizzlies	23	59	.280	38
14	e-Golden State Warriors	21	61	.256	40

z - clinched division title
y - clinched division title
x - clinched playoff spot

== Game log ==
=== Regular season ===
2001–02 game log
Total: 58–24 (home: 32–9; road: 26–15)
October: 1–0 (home: 1–0; road: 0–0)

Game	Date	Team	Score	High points	High rebounds	High assists	Location Attendance	Record
1	October 30	L. A. Clippers	W 109–98	Steve Smith (19)	Tim Duncan (13)	Terry Porter (6)	Alamodome; 16,803	1–0

November: 9–4 (home: 6–1; road: 3–3)

Game	Date	Team	Score	High points	High rebounds	High assists	Location Attendance	Record
2	November 1	@ Seattle	L 108–114	Tim Duncan (22)	Tim Duncan (13)	Tim Duncan, Steve Smith (4)	KeyArena; 15,491	1–1
3	November 3	@ Portland	W 106–90	Steve Smith (36)	Tim Duncan (15)	Tony Parker (6)	Rose Garden Arena; 19,980	2–1
4	November 4	@ Sacramento	L 83–103	Tim Duncan (17)	Tim Duncan (13)	Antonio Daniels, Terry Porter (3)	ARCO Arena; 17,317	2–2
5	November 6	Orlando	W 104–89	Tim Duncan (26)	Tim Duncan (14)	Terry Porter (5)	Alamodome; 15,927	3–2
6	November 8	@ Charlotte	W 105–95	Tim Duncan (33)	Tim Duncan (16)	Terry Porter, Tony Parker, Bruce Bowen (5)	Charlotte Coliseum; 9,511	4–2
7	November 10	Atlanta	W 110–88	Tim Duncan (20)	Tim Duncan (13)	Tony Parker (8)	Alamodome; 20,403	5–2
8	November 13	Houston	W 90–86	Tim Duncan (19)	Tim Duncan (9)	Tony Parker (4)	Alamodome; 15,643	6–2
9	November 16	Cleveland	W 105–91	Tim Duncan (27)	Malik Rose (11)	Tony Parker (8)	Alamodome; 19,222	7–2
10	November 21	Seattle	W 110–93	Tim Duncan (30)	Tim Duncan (13)	Tony Parker (7)	Alamodome; 18,163	8–2
11	November 23	@ Indiana	W 97–79	Tim Duncan (30)	Tim Duncan (18)	Tim Duncan (5)	Conseco Fieldhouse; 18,345	9–2
12	November 24	@ Minnesota	L 94–99	Tim Duncan (21)	Tim Duncan (18)	Tim Duncan (8)	Target Center; 19,006	9–3
13	November 28	Golden State	W 94–83	David Robinson (19)	David Robinson, Tim Duncan (12)	Tim Duncan (5)	Alamodome; 16,442	10–3
14	November 30	Sacramento	L 106–109 (OT)	Tim Duncan (38)	David Robinson (12)	Tony Parker (4)	Alamodome; 26,808	10–4

December: 11–3 (home: 6–2; road: 5–1)

Game	Date	Team	Score	High points	High rebounds	High assists	Location Attendance	Record
15	December 1	@ Houston	W 85–75	Tim Duncan (25)	Tim Duncan (12)	Tony Parker (5)	Compaq Center; 12,232	11–4
16	December 4	Washington	W 103–88	Antonio Daniels (15)	Tim Duncan (11)	Tim Duncan, Tony Parker (5)	Alamodome; 35,052	12–4
17	December 5	@ Atlanta	W 120–112	Steve Smith (29)	Tim Duncan (15)	Tony Parker (8)	Philips Arena; 8,253	13–4
18	December 7	Philadelphia	W 86–76	Charles Smith (20)	Tim Duncan, David Robinson, Malik Rose (9)	Antonio Daniels (6)	Alamodome; 29,836	14–4
19	December 12	Toronto	W 108–95	Tim Duncan (28)	Tim Duncan (13)	Tony Parker (6)	Alamodome; 16,650	15–4
20	December 14	@ Phoenix	W 105–93	Tim Duncan (32)	Tim Duncan (19)	Terry Porter (6)	America West Arena; 16,187	16–4
21	December 15	Utah	W 100–80	Tim Duncan (26)	Tim Duncan (10)	Terry Porter (3)	Alamodome; 20,712	17–4
22	December 18	@ Denver	W 102–93	Tim Duncan (24)	Tim Duncan (16)	Tim Duncan (5)	Pepsi Center; 14,118	18–4
23	December 19	Portland	W 97–79	Tim Duncan (26)	David Robinson (16)	Tony Parker (6)	Alamodome; 16,089	19–4
24	December 21	Denver	W 109–74	Tim Duncan (21)	David Robinson, Malik Rose (8)	Charles Smith (5)	Alamodome; 22,831	20–4
25	December 23	Milwaukee	L 91–101	Tim Duncan (22)	Tim Duncan (18)	Tony Parker (5)	Alamodome; 24,708	20–5
26	December 26	Dallas	L 123–126 (OT)	Tim Duncan (53)	Tim Duncan (11)	Tim Duncan (4)	Alamodome; 20,667	20–6
27	December 29	@ Milwaukee	L 99–102 (OT)	Tim Duncan (38)	Tim Duncan (16)	Tony Parker (7)	Bradley Center; 18,717	20–7
28	December 30	@ Memphis	W 83–79	Tim Duncan (27)	Tim Duncan (18)	Steve Smith, Antonio Daniels (5)	Pyramid Arena; 17,358	21–7

January: 8–8 (home: 3–5; road: 5–3)

Game	Date	Team	Score	High points	High rebounds	High assists	Location Attendance	Record
29	January 2	Detroit	W 97–85	Tim Duncan (20)	Tim Duncan (15)	Terry Porter (8)	Alamodome; 16,648	22–7
30	January 4	Indiana	L 82–92	Tim Duncan (22)	Tim Duncan (12)	Tim Duncan (6)	Alamodome; 29,243	22–8
31	January 5	@ Dallas	W 105–103	Tim Duncan (29)	Tim Duncan (17)	Terry Porter (6)	American Airlines Center; 20,123	23–8
32	January 7	New York	W 90–79	Tim Duncan (21)	Tim Duncan (12)	Tony Parker (5)	Alamodome; 18,428	24–8
33	January 9	@ Boston	W 93–90	Tim Duncan (25)	Tim Duncan (12)	Antonio Daniels (5)	FleetCenter; 16,003	25–8
34	January 11	@ Philadelphia	L 84–101	Tim Duncan (22)	Tim Duncan (15)	Tony Parker, Antonio Daniels, Terry Porter (3)	First Union Center; 20,488	25–9
35	January 14	@ New Jersey	L 97–99	Tim Duncan (27)	Tim Duncan (9)	Tim Duncan, Terry Porter (6)	Continental Airlines Arena; 11,091	25–10
36	January 15	@ Washington	W 96–91	Tim Duncan (22)	David Robinson (10)	Terry Porter (7)	MCI Center; 20,674	26–10
37	January 17	Utah	W 102–98	Tim Duncan (35)	Tim Duncan (10)	Antonio Daniels (6)	Alamodome; 16,868	27–10
38	January 19	L. A. Lakers	L 81–98	Charles Smith (21)	Tim Duncan (15)	Tim Duncan (4)	Alamodome; 33,544	27–11
39	January 22	New Jersey	L 86–92	Tim Duncan (32)	Tim Duncan (14)	Charles Smith (6)	Alamodome; 17,701	27–12
40	January 23	@ Utah	W 98–92	Steve Smith (29)	Tim Duncan (9)	Antonio Daniels (5)	Delta Center; 19,623	28–12
41	January 25	@ L. A. Lakers	L 91–94	Tim Duncan (24)	David Robinson (12)	Terry Porter (6)	STAPLES Center; 18,997	28–13
42	January 26	@ Golden State	W 90–82	Tim Duncan (20)	Tim Duncan (9)	Tony Parker (6)	The Arena in Oakland; 18,328	29–13
43	January 29	Charlotte	L 73–78	Tim Duncan (29)	Tim Duncan (21)	Tony Parker (4)	Alamodome; 16,624	29–14
44	January 31	L. A. Clippers	L 87–91	Tim Duncan (23)	Tim Duncan (16)	Antonio Daniels (4)	Alamodome; 17,288	29–15

February: 7–6 (home: 4–1; road: 3–5)

Game	Date	Team	Score	High points	High rebounds	High assists	Location Attendance	Record
45	February 1	@ Miami	L 83–88	Tim Duncan (29)	Tim Duncan (12)	Tony Parker (5)	AmericanAirlines Arena; 15,658	29–16
46	February 3	@ Orlando	W 105–98 (OT)	Tim Duncan (29)	Tim Duncan (15)	Antonio Daniels (7)	TD Waterhouse Centre; 15,072	30–16
47	February 4	Minnesota	W 113–83	David Robinson, Tim Duncan, Antonio Daniels (13)	David Robinson (15)	Tony Parker (5)	Alamodome; 17,809	31–16
48	February 7	@ Toronto	L 74–80 (OT)	Tim Duncan (22)	Tim Duncan (17)	Steve Smith (5)	Air Canada Centre; 19,800	31–17
All-Star Break
49	February 12	@ Sacramento	L 86–99	Tim Duncan (24)	Tim Duncan (21)	Tony Parker (6)	ARCO Arena; 17,317	31–18
50	February 14	@ L. A. Clippers	W 89–76	Tim Duncan (15)	Tim Duncan (11)	Antonio Daniels, Steve Smith (4)	STAPLES Center; 18,964	32–18
51	February 15	@ Golden State	W 108–99	Tim Duncan (36)	Tim Duncan (11)	Tim Duncan (8)	The Arena in Oakland; 14,187	33–18
52	February 19	Memphis	W 99–93 (OT)	Tim Duncan (23)	David Robinson (14)	Tim Duncan, Antonio Daniels, Tony Parker (5)	Alamodome; 16,229	34–18
53	February 21	Sacramento	W 115–92	Charles Smith (32)	Tim Duncan (13)	Tony Parker (7)	Alamodome; 18,594	35–18
54	February 23	Minnesota	L 88–112	Tim Duncan (25)	David Robinson (9)	Antonio Daniels (6)	Alamodome; 34,735	35–19
55	February 24	@ Phoenix	L 83–92	David Robinson (25)	Tim Duncan (13)	Tim Duncan (5)	America West Arena; 15,836	35–20
56	February 26	Phoenix	W 99–91	Tim Duncan (29)	Tim Duncan (15)	David Robinson (5)	Alamodome; 19,013	36–20
57	February 28	@ Cleveland	L 107–114 (OT)	Tim Duncan (35)	Tim Duncan (12)	Charles Smith (7)	Gund Arena; 15,481	36–21

March: 13–3 (home: 7–0; road: 6–3)

Game	Date	Team	Score	High points	High rebounds	High assists	Location Attendance	Record
58	March 1	@ Minnesota	W 85–77	Tim Duncan (25)	Tim Duncan (11)	Tony Parker (6)	Target Center; 19,799	37–21
59	March 3	@ New York	W 99–83	Tim Duncan (25)	David Robinson (15)	Tony Parker (7)	Madison Square Garden; 19,763	38–21
60	March 5	Golden State	W 109–88	Tim Duncan (23)	David Robinson (9)	Tony Parker (7)	Alamodome; 19,322	39–21
61	March 7	Houston	W 99–97	Tim Duncan (30)	Tim Duncan (16)	Tim Duncan, Tony Parker (5)	Alamodome; 17,094	40–21
62	March 9	@ Chicago	W 100–73	Tim Duncan (22)	Tim Duncan, David Robinson (11)	Tim Duncan (7)	United Center; 20,489	41–21
63	March 11	@ Denver	W 93–78	Tim Duncan (21)	Tim Duncan (9)	Terry Porter (6)	Pepsi Center; 13,511	42–21
64	March 12	Memphis	W 98–84	Tim Duncan (23)	Tim Duncan (13)	Tony Parker (5)	Alamodome; 19,519	43–21
65	March 14	Chicago	W 91–86	Tim Duncan (24)	David Robinson (17)	Tim Duncan, Antonio Daniels, Tony Parker (4)	Alamodome; 19,592	44–21
66	March 16	Boston	W 111–104	Tim Duncan (37)	Tim Duncan (10)	Danny Ferry, Tony Parker (5)	Alamodome; 34,753	45–21
67	March 20	L. A. Lakers	W 108–90	Tim Duncan (25)	Tim Duncan (9)	Antonio Daniels, Terry Porter (6)	Alamodome; 30,775	46–21
68	March 21	@ Dallas	W 105–102	Tim Duncan (32)	Tim Duncan (14)	Tim Duncan (5)	American Airlines Center; 20,133	47–21
69	March 23	Miami	W 89–79	Tim Duncan (23)	Tim Duncan (11)	Tony Parker (8)	American Airlines Center; 24,336	48–21
70	March 25	@ L. A. Clippers	W 91–85	Tim Duncan (33)	Tim Duncan (13)	Tony Parker (7)	STAPLES Center; 20,128	49–21
71	March 27	@ Portland	L 93–98	Tim Duncan (34)	Tim Duncan, David Robinson (11)	Tony Parker (8)	Rose Garden Arena; 19,980	49–22
72	March 29	@ Seattle	L 76–79	Tim Duncan (25)	Tim Duncan (16)	Steve Smith (5)	KeyArena; 17,072	49–23
73	March 31	@ L. A. Lakers	L 95–96	Tim Duncan (26)	Tim Duncan (11)	Tim Duncan (8)	STAPLES Center; 17,072	49–24

April: 9–0 (home: 5–0; road: 4–0)

Game	Date	Team	Score	High points	High rebounds	High assists	Location Attendance	Record
74	April 3	Seattle	W 90–88	Tim Duncan (30)	Tim Duncan (18)	Tim Duncan (9)	Alamodome; 19,223	50–24
75	April 4	Houston	W 102–78	Tim Duncan (22)	Malik Rose (14)	Tony Parker (7)	Compaq Center; 12,169	51–24
76	April 6	Dallas	W 89–87	Tim Duncan (33)	Tim Duncan (16)	Tim Duncan, Tony Parker (5)	Alamodome; 34,739	52–24
77	April 8	Portland	W 99–87	Tim Duncan (24)	Tim Duncan (8)	Tim Duncan (6)	Alamodome; 28,278	53–24
78	April 10	Denver	W 87–79	Tim Duncan (16)	Tim Duncan (11)	Bruce Bowen (4)	Alamodome; 19,893	54–24
79	April 12	@ Detroit	W 96–86	Tim Duncan (32)	Tim Duncan (11)	Tony Parker (10)	The Palace of Auburn Hills; 22,076	55–24
80	April 13	@ Memphis	W 113–92	Tim Duncan (30)	Tim Duncan (14)	Tim Duncan, Antonio Daniels (7)	Pyramid Arena; 19,405	56–24
81	April 16	Phoenix	W 95–71	Tim Duncan (24)	Tim Duncan (11)	Tony Parker (7)	Alamodome; 30,186	57–24
82	April 17	@ Utah	L 84–86	Tim Duncan (26)	Tim Duncan (16)	Tim Duncan (6)	Delta Center; 19,490	58–24

2001–02 season schedule

=== Playoffs ===
2002 playoff game log
First Round: 3–2 (home: 2–1; road: 1–1)

Game	Date	Team	Score	High points	High rebounds	High assists	Location Attendance	Series
1	April 20	Seattle	W 110–89	Duncan, Parker (21)	Tim Duncan (10)	Tim Duncan (11)	Alamodome; 23,634	1–0
2	April 22	Seattle	L 90–98	Tim Duncan (32)	Tim Duncan (12)	Tim Duncan (3)	Alamodome; 23,059	1–1
3	April 27	@ Seattle	W 102–75	Tim Duncan (27)	Tim Duncan (13)	Tim Duncan (5)	KeyArena; 17,072	2–1
4	May 1	@ Seattle	L 79–91	Malik Rose (28)	Malik Rose (13)	Porter, Rose (3)	KeyArena; 17,072	2–2
5	May 3	Seattle	W 101–78	Tim Duncan (23)	Malik Rose (13)	Steve Smith (6)	Alamodome; 23,369	3–2

Conference semifinals: 1–4 (home: 0–2; road: 1–2)

Game	Date	Team	Score	High points	High rebounds	High assists	Location Attendance	Series
1	May 5	@ L.A. Lakers	L 80–86	Tim Duncan (26)	Tim Duncan (21)	Tim Duncan (5)	Staples Center; 18,997	0–1
2	May 7	@ L.A. Lakers	W 88–85	Tim Duncan (27)	Tim Duncan (17)	Tony Parker (9)	Staples Center; 18,997	1–1
3	May 10	L.A. Lakers	L 89–99	Tim Duncan (28)	Tim Duncan (12)	Tony Parker (5)	Alamodome; 35,520	1–2
4	May 12	L.A. Lakers	L 85–87	Tim Duncan (30)	Duncan, Robinson (11)	Tim Duncan (6)	Alamodome; 32,342	1–3
5	May 14	@ L.A. Lakers	L 87–93	Tim Duncan (34)	Tim Duncan (25)	Tony Parker (6)	Staples Center; 18,997	1–4

2002 schedule

== Player statistics ==
=== Regular season ===
Player	POS	GP	GS	MP	REB	AST	STL	BLK	PTS	MPG	RPG	APG	SPG	BPG	PPG
Tim Duncan	PF	82	82	3,329	1,042	307	61	203	2,089	40.6	12.7	3.7	.7	2.5	25.5
Antonio Daniels	SG	82	13	2,175	176	228	48	12	753	26.5	2.1	2.8	.6	.1	9.2
Malik Rose	PF	82	1	1,725	492	61	70	42	772	21.0	6.0	.7	.9	.5	9.4
David Robinson	C	78	78	2,303	647	94	86	140	951	29.5	8.3	1.2	1.1	1.8	12.2
Steve Smith	SG	77	76	2,211	193	151	54	15	895	28.7	2.5	2.0	.7	.2	11.6
Tony Parker	PG	77	72	2,267	197	334	89	7	705	29.4	2.6	4.3	1.2	.1	9.2
Terry Porter	PG	72	0	1,294	164	205	45	16	399	18.0	2.3	2.8	.6	.2	5.5
Charles Smith	SG	60	22	1,141	133	80	52	44	441	19.0	2.2	1.3	.9	.7	7.4
Bruce Bowen	SF	59	59	1,699	162	88	62	25	412	28.8	2.7	1.5	1.1	.4	7.0
Danny Ferry	SF	50	2	799	90	48	16	9	229	16.0	1.8	1.0	.3	.2	4.6
Cherokee Parks	C	42	1	234	58	10	7	8	63	5.6	1.4	.2	.2	.2	1.5
Mark Bryant	PF	30	3	206	44	10	7	2	56	6.9	1.5	.3	.2	.1	1.9
Amal McCaskill	C	27	0	153	36	4	6	10	52	5.7	1.3	.1	.2	.4	1.9
Stephen Jackson	SF	23	1	227	26	11	15	3	89	9.9	1.1	.5	.7	.1	3.9
Jason Hart	PG	10	0	92	13	12	7	1	26	9.2	1.3	1.2	.7	.1	2.6

=== Playoffs ===
Player	POS	GP	GS	MP	REB	AST	STL	BLK	PTS	MPG	RPG	APG	SPG	BPG	PPG
Bruce Bowen	SF	10	10	345	33	14	11	7	68	34.5	3.3	1.4	1.1	.7	6.8
Tony Parker	PG	10	10	341	29	40	9	1	155	34.1	2.9	4.0	.9	.1	15.5
Steve Smith	SG	10	10	298	34	17	8	1	103	29.8	3.4	1.7	.8	.1	10.3
Malik Rose	PF	10	3	292	79	14	10	5	129	29.2	7.9	1.4	1.0	.5	12.9
Antonio Daniels	SG	10	0	224	27	15	7	3	95	22.4	2.7	1.5	.7	.3	9.5
Danny Ferry	SF	10	0	155	20	8	0	1	28	15.5	2.0	.8	.0	.1	2.8
Terry Porter	PG	10	0	131	9	8	4	0	33	13.1	.9	.8	.4	.0	3.3
Tim Duncan	PF	9	9	380	130	45	6	39	248	42.2	14.4	5.0	.7	4.3	27.6
Mark Bryant	PF	9	4	91	12	1	1	2	21	10.1	1.3	.1	.1	.2	2.3
Cherokee Parks	C	5	0	43	11	0	0	2	8	8.6	2.2	.0	.0	.4	1.6
David Robinson	C	4	4	81	23	5	3	3	18	20.3	5.8	1.3	.8	.8	4.5
Charles Smith	SG	4	0	19	3	2	2	1	5	4.8	.8	.5	.5	.3	1.3

== Awards and records ==
- Tim Duncan, NBA Most Valuable Player Award
- Tim Duncan, All-NBA First Team
- Tim Duncan, NBA All-Defensive First Team
- Bruce Bowen, NBA All-Defensive Second Team
- Tony Parker, NBA All-Rookie Team 1st Team

== Transactions ==
=== Overview ===
Players Added

Via draft
- Tony Parker

Via trade

- Steve Smith

Via free agency

- Bruce Bowen
- Mark Bryant
- Stephen Jackson
- Charles Smith
- Jason Hart
Players Lost

Via trade
- Derek Anderson
- Steve Kerr

Via free agency

- Derrick Dial
- Avery Johnson
- Ira Newble
- Shawnelle Scott
- Samaki Walker

Retired

- Sean Elliott

Player Transactions Citation:

== See also ==
- 2001–02 NBA season
