= Dana Barros =

American basketball player and coach

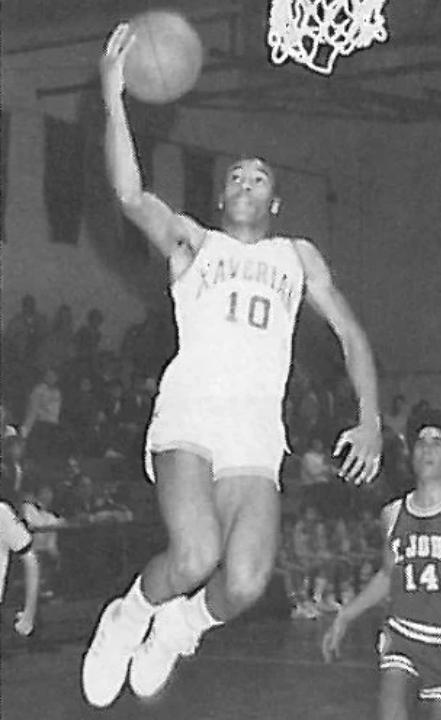

Personal information
- Born: April 13, 1967 (age 59) Boston, Massachusetts, U.S.
- Listed height: 5 ft 10 in (1.78 m)
- Listed weight: 163 lb (74 kg)

Career information
- High school: Xaverian (Westwood, Massachusetts)
- College: Boston College (1985–1989)
- NBA draft: 1989: 1st round, 16th overall pick
- Drafted by: Seattle SuperSonics
- Playing career: 1989–2004
- Position: Point guard / shooting guard
- Number: 11, 3, 1, 13

Career history
- 1989–1993: Seattle SuperSonics
- 1993–1995: Philadelphia 76ers
- 1995–2000: Boston Celtics
- 2000–2002: Detroit Pistons
- 2004: Boston Celtics

Career highlights
- NBA All-Star (1995); NBA Most Improved Player (1995); First-team All-Big East (1988); 2× Second-team All-Big East (1987, 1989)

Career NBA statistics
- Points: 8,901 (10.5 ppg)
- Rebounds: 1,609 (1.9 rpg)
- Assists: 2,837 (3.3 apg)
- Stats at NBA.com
- Stats at Basketball Reference

Dana Bruce Barros (born April 13, 1967) is an American former professional basketball player from the National Basketball Association (NBA). In college, he played at Boston College, finishing as one of the school's all-time leading scorers. He was the head men's basketball coach at Newbury College in Massachusetts. He is now the owner of AAU Basketball organization, the "Dana Barros Gladiators", based in Avon, Massachusetts, and now Stoughton, Massachusetts. He is of Cape Verdean descent.

== High school career ==
Barros was a four-year basketball starter at Xaverian Brothers High School in Westwood, Massachusetts, where he tallied 1,821 points, including a record 57 points in a tournament game versus Needham. The 1985 Catholic Conference MVP and Boston Globe All Scholastic averaged over 30 points per game during his senior campaign in an era before the 3-point shot was implemented. He is now in the Xaverian Brothers High School "Hall of Fame".

== College career ==
Barros played college basketball for Boston College. On February 25, 2017, Barros' number 3 was retired at Boston College.

== Professional career ==
The 5-foot-11-inch (1.80 m), 165-pound (75 kg) point guard, began his professional career in 1989 when he was selected in the first round of the NBA draft by the Seattle SuperSonics with the 16th pick. Most of his time spent in Seattle was as a backup to point guard Gary Payton, who was considered to be a much more competent ball handler and defender, as Barros was deemed more usable at shooting guard.

Prior to the 1993–94 season, the Sonics traded Barros to the Charlotte Hornets in exchange for Kendall Gill. Two days later, Charlotte traded Barros, Sidney Green, and their 1993 draft choice, Greg Graham, to the Philadelphia 76ers for Hersey Hawkins.

In Philadelphia, Barros received much more playing time (31 minutes per game) with the Sixers, than when he was with the Western Conference SuperSonics (18 minutes per game). This allowed him to improve his scoring output the previous season with Seattle from 7.8 to 13.3 points per game. He was the last Sixer to wear #3 for the team, prior to the arrival of Allen Iverson.

In Barros' second season with the Sixers (1994–95) he achieved career highs in minutes per game (40.5), field goal percentage (49.0%), three-point percentage (46.4%), scoring average (20.6 points per contest), rebounding (3.3 per game) and assists (7.5) while playing all 82 regular season games. Highlights included a 50-point, 8-rebound performance against the Houston Rockets in March 1995, and a 25-point, 10-rebound, 15-assist triple-double effort against the Orlando Magic a few weeks later. Barros was selected to play in the 1995 NBA All-Star Game and at season's end was voted the league's Most Improved Player. He also set an NBA record by making at least one three-pointer in 89 consecutive games from December 23, 1994, until January 10, 1996. This record was broken by Kyle Korver in December 2013. Barros appeared four consecutive times at the AT&T Long Distance Shootout during the All-Star Weekend from 1992 to 1996, coming in second twice.

Barros became a free agent at the end of the 1994-95 NBA season. He signed with his hometown Boston Celtics, and remained for five seasons as a role player alongside David Wesley and Dee Brown and mentor to younger players such as Antoine Walker and Paul Pierce.

In the offseason of 2000, Barros was traded to the Dallas Mavericks as part of a four-team deal that also involved the Utah Jazz and Golden State Warriors. By the time the 2000–01 season had commenced, the Mavs had traded Barros to the Detroit Pistons, where he played 89 games over two seasons, averaging 7.5 points per game, until waiving him in 2002.

After that, he was out of the NBA for almost two years, before rejoining the Celtics towards the end of the 2003–04 regular season, first as an assistant coach and later as a player. He scored six points in one final game. He retired from the league with career averages of 10.5 points, 1.9 rebounds, 3.3 assists and a career three-point average of 41.1%.

== Post-basketball Life ==
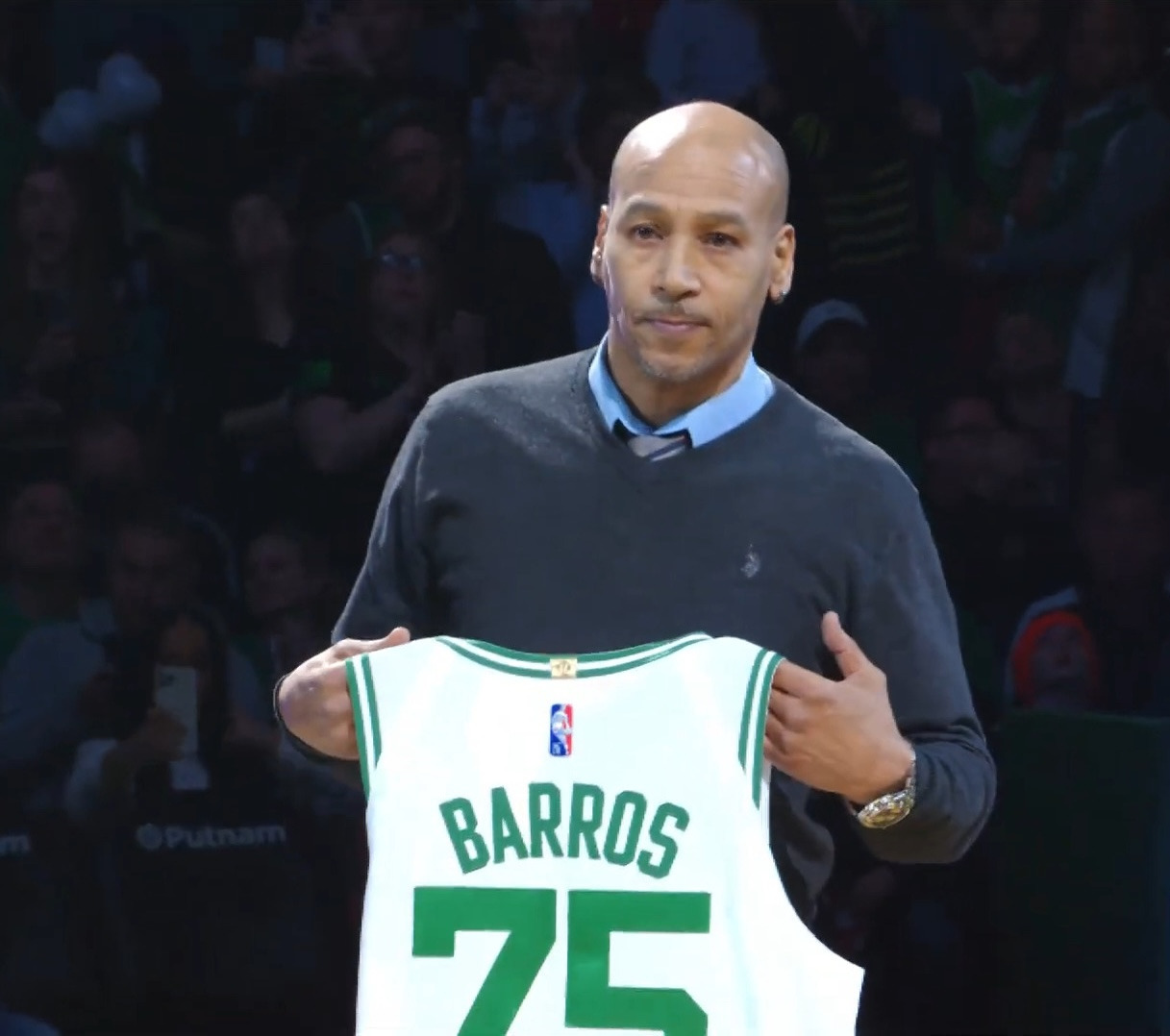
Barros in 2022

After retiring from basketball, Barros opened the Dana Barros Sports Complex, a sports and social club in Mansfield, Massachusetts (now called M-Plex) 65000 sq ft Multi-Sport Indoor. However, the project proved more costly than Barros expected. He incurred massive debts which caused him to leave the project. In 2018, he opened a new Basketball Club and Sports Complex, in Stoughton, Massachusetts, which has done much better. The current Sports Complex and Basketball Club in Stoughton has five basketball courts and hosts AAU games, tournaments, and basketball camps.

For two months in 2006, Barros worked as an assistant coach for the Northeastern University men's basketball team, a position from which he resigned in June 2006 to accept a role as the Director of Recreation for the city of Boston.

Barros is now with the media relations department for the Celtics.

Barros serves as a "basketball insider" for New England Sports Network (NESN) and offers analysis and insight on the NBA on the show NESN Daily.

== In media ==
Barros also appeared on the album titled B-Ball's Best Kept Secret, a 1994 album featuring tracks of an array of early 1990s NBA players. He is featured on a song called "Check It". He is also featured with fellow NBA All-Star Cedric Ceballos and rappers Grand Puba, Sadat X, AG and Diamond D on a song "Ya Don't Stop".

== Personal life ==
Barros has two sons, Jordan and Jayson Barros, both of whom were student-athletes at Boston College (basketball and tennis, respectively).

== Career statistics ==
Legend
GP	Games played	GS	Games started	MPG	Minutes per game
FG%	Field goal percentage	3P%	3-point field goal percentage	FT%	Free throw percentage
RPG	Rebounds per game	APG	Assists per game	SPG	Steals per game
BPG	Blocks per game	PPG	Points per game	**Bold**	Career high
*	Led the league

=== Regular season ===
Year	Team	GP	GS	MPG	FG%	3P%	FT%	RPG	APG	SPG	BPG	PPG
1989–90	Seattle	81	25	20.1	.405	.399	.809	1.6	2.5	0.7	0.0	9.7
1990–91	Seattle	66	0	11.4	.495	.395	.918	1.1	1.7	0.3	0.0	6.3
1991–92	Seattle	75	1	17.7	.483	.446*	.759	1.1	1.7	0.7	0.1	8.3
1992–93	Seattle	69	2	18.0	.451	.379	.831	1.6	2.2	0.9	0.0	7.8
1993–94	Philadelphia	81	70	31.1	.469	.381	.800	2.4	5.2	1.3	0.1	13.3
1994–95	Philadelphia	**82***	**82***	**40.5**	.490	**.464**	.899	**3.3**	**7.5**	**1.8**	0.0	**20.6**
1995–96	Boston	80	25	29.1	.470	.408	.884	2.4	3.8	0.7	0.0	13.0
1996–97	Boston	24	8	29.5	.435	.410	.860	2.0	3.4	1.1	**0.3**	12.5
1997–98	Boston	80	15	21.1	.461	.407	.847	1.9	3.6	1.0	0.1	9.8
1998–99	Boston	50*	16	23.1	.453	.400	.877	2.1	4.2	1.0	0.1	9.3
1999–00	Boston	72	0	15.8	.451	.410	.866	1.4	1.8	0.4	0.1	7.2
2000–01	Detroit	60	0	18.0	.444	.419	.850	1.6	1.8	0.5	0.0	8.0
2001–02	Detroit	29	20	20.1	.385	.338	.778	2.0	2.7	0.5	0.1	6.7
2003–04	Boston	1	0	11.0	**.667**	.000	**1.000**	0.0	0.0	0.0	0.0	6.0
Career		850	264	22.9	.460	.411	.858	1.9	3.3	0.9	0.1	10.5
All-Star		1	0	11.0	.400	.333	.000	1.0	3.0	0.0	0.0	5.0

=== Playoffs ===
Year	Team	GP	GS	MPG	FG%	3P%	FT%	RPG	APG	SPG	BPG	PPG
1991	Seattle	3	0	8.3	**.692**	.400	**.750**	**1.3**	**1.7**	**1.0**	0.0	**7.7**
1992	Seattle	7	0	**13.7**	.525	**.588**	–	1.0	1.1	0.6	0.0	7.4
1993	Seattle	**16**	0	8.5	.468	.313	**.750**	0.8	0.8	0.3	0.0	3.4
2002	Detroit	4	0	1.5	.333	.000	–	0.0	0.3	0.0	0.0	0.5
2004	Boston	1	0	1.0	.000	–	–	0.0	0.0	0.0	0.0	0.0
Career		31	0	8.5	.510	.436	.750	0.7	0.8	0.4	0.0	4.3

== See also ==
- List of National Basketball Association career 3-point field goal percentage leaders
