= Donny Marshall =

American basketball player (born 1972)

Personal information
- Born: July 17, 1972 (age 54) Detroit, Michigan, U.S.
- Listed height: 6 ft 7 in (2.01 m)
- Listed weight: 230 lb (104 kg)

Career information
- High school: Federal Way (Federal Way, Washington)
- College: UConn (1991–1995)
- NBA draft: 1995: 2nd round, 39th overall pick
- Drafted by: Cleveland Cavaliers
- Playing career: 1995–2003
- Position: Small forward
- Number: 33, 13

Career history
- 1995–1997: Cleveland Cavaliers
- 1999–2000: Connecticut Pride
- 2000: Cleveland Cavaliers
- 2000–2001: Connecticut Pride
- 2001–2003: New Jersey Nets

Career highlights
- 2x Third-team All-Big East (1994, 1995); All-CBA Second Team (2000)
- Stats at NBA.com
- Stats at Basketball Reference

Donald Evert Canaday Marshall (born July 17, 1972) is an American former professional basketball player who played five seasons in the National Basketball Association (NBA) for the Cleveland Cavaliers and New Jersey Nets. He is currently a college basketball television analyst for Fox Sports 1, NBC Sports, Westwood One National Radio and CBSSN.

== Career ==
After leading his high school basketball team to over 100 wins and being named to Washington's All-State team 4 consecutive years (along with being a 4-time All-State selection as a soccer player), Marshall graduated from Federal Way High School, a school in the suburb of Seattle. Marshall chose to play for the University of Connecticut Huskies men's basketball team. As a 4-year letter winner, he helped lead the Huskies to the postseason each of his last 3 seasons as co-captain. Was named to the NCAA All-Tournament team as a senior averaging over 24 points a game in the tourney. Marshall was later named to UConn's All-Century team (top 25 players in school history) and was also a two-time All-Big East Team member, leading the Big East in free throw shooting his senior year. He was then selected in the second round (39th pick overall) of the 1995 NBA draft by the Cleveland Cavaliers. Marshall played 6 seasons in the NBA with the Cavaliers, Milwaukee Bucks, and the New Jersey Nets. With the Nets, Marshall made it to consecutive NBA Finals in 2001-02 and 2002–03.

Marshall played for the Connecticut Pride of the Continental Basketball Association (CBA) from 1999 to 2001. He was selected to the All-CBA Second Team in 2000.

== After the NBA ==
Marshall has been in television broadcasting for 19 years, covering over 1,300 professional and collegiate basketball games. He worked as a color commentator/basketball studio analyst for the Boston Celtics on Comcast SportsNet in New England for 8 years covering over 650 NBA games. He was also a color commentator for NBC Sports Network college basketball telecasts. Marshall provided basketball color commentary for NBC during the 2012 Summer Olympics in London. Marshall covered games from the sidelines for the Brooklyn Nets from the 2013 to 2017 NBA seasons. He currently is an NCAA basketball television analyst for FOX Sports. He also provides analysis for WestwoodOne national radio broadcasts during the men's NCAA championship basketball tournament each spring since 2014.

== Community work ==
Marshall was a golf course owner in his home state of Connecticut. He is deeply rooted in community service in New England. He once served on the Board of Trustees at his alma mater, the University of Connecticut. He is also a member of the Board of Directors for the First Tee of Connecticut, a group that provides exposure, teaching, and scholarships through golf to children in Connecticut. Marshall is also the Anti-Bullying spokesperson for the Community Foundation of Middlesex County and the state of Connecticut.

== Personal life ==
Marshall and his wife Jillian reside in Connecticut with their three children.

== Career statistics ==
Legend
GP	Games played	GS	Games started	MPG	Minutes per game
FG%	Field goal percentage	3P%	3-point field goal percentage	FT%	Free throw percentage
RPG	Rebounds per game	APG	Assists per game	SPG	Steals per game
BPG	Blocks per game	PPG	Points per game	**Bold**	Career high

=== NBA ===
==== Regular season ====
Year	Team	GP	GS	MPG	FG%	3P%	FT%	RPG	APG	SPG	BPG	PPG
1995–96	Cleveland	34	0	6.1	**.353**	.233	.629	.8	.2	.2	**.1**	2.3
1996–97	Cleveland	**56**	0	**9.8**	.325	.379	.704	**1.3**	**.4**	**.4**	**.1**	**3.1**
1999–00	Cleveland	6	0	6.5	.273	.000	**.833**	.2	.0	.3	.0	1.8
2001–02	New Jersey	20	0	5.9	.276	**.500**	.667	1.1	.3	.2	.0	1.5
2002–03	New Jersey	3	0	2.0	.000	.000	–	1.0	.0	.0	.0	.0
Career		119	0	7.7	.321	.336	.681	1.0	.3	.3	.0	2.5

==== Playoffs ====
Year	Team	GP	GS	MPG	FG%	3P%	FT%	RPG	APG	SPG	BPG	PPG
1996	Cleveland	1	0	1.0	–	–	–	.0	.0	.0	.0	.0
2002	New Jersey	**7**	0	**2.0**	**.200**	.000	**1.000**	.0	.0	.0	.0	**.4**
Career		8	0	1.9	.200	.000	1.000	.0	.0	.0	.0	.4
