= Todd MacCulloch =

Canadian basketball player (born 1976)

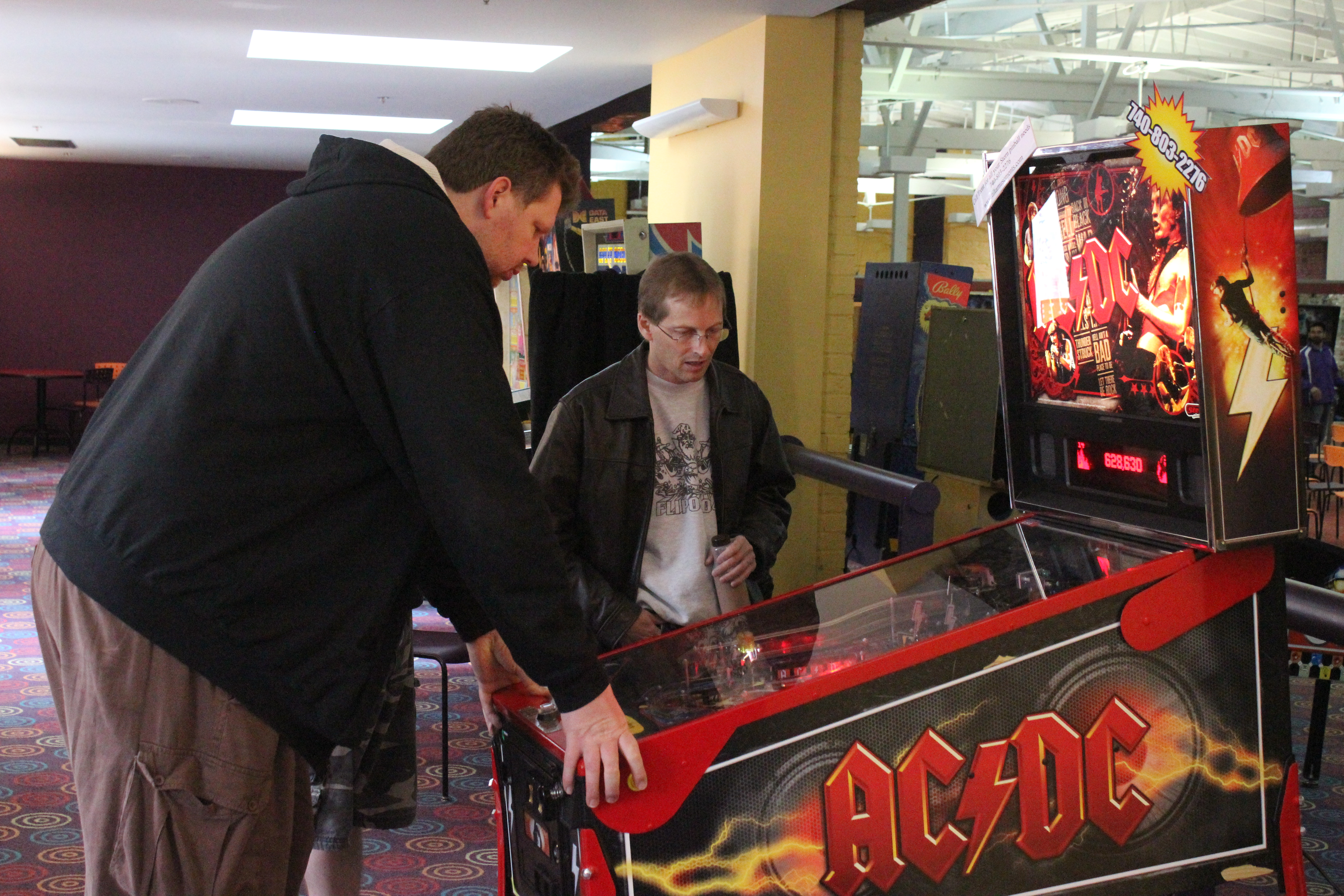
- MacCulloch playing pinball in 2012

Personal information
- Born: January 27, 1976 (age 50) Winnipeg, Manitoba, Canada
- Listed height: 7 ft 0 in (2.13 m)
- Listed weight: 280 lb (127 kg)

Career information
- High school: Shaftesbury (Winnipeg, Manitoba)
- College: Washington (1995–1999)
- NBA draft: 1999: 2nd round, 47th overall pick
- Drafted by: Philadelphia 76ers
- Playing career: 1999–2003
- Position: Centre
- Number: 50, 11

Career history
- 1999–2001: Philadelphia 76ers
- 2001–2002: New Jersey Nets
- 2002–2003: Philadelphia 76ers

Career highlights
- 2× First-team All-Pac-10 (1998, 1999)

Career NBA statistics
- Points: 1,369 (6.1 ppg)
- Rebounds: 888 (4.0 rpg)
- Blocks: 177 (0.8 bpg)
- Stats at NBA.com
- Stats at Basketball Reference
Medals
Men's basketball
Representing Canada
Universiade
Bronze medal – third place	1995 Fukuoka	National team
FIBA Americas Championship
Silver medal – second place	1999 San Juan	National team
Bronze medal – third place	2001 Neuquén	National team

Todd Carlyle MacCulloch (born January 27, 1976) is a Canadian former professional basketball player who played four seasons in the National Basketball Association (NBA). He was drafted by the Philadelphia 76ers as the 47th overall pick in the 1999 NBA draft after playing college basketball for the University of Washington. MacCulloch played center for the Philadelphia 76ers and New Jersey Nets before being forced to retire prematurely due to a genetic neuromuscular disorder that affected his feet, Charcot-Marie-Tooth disease. After retiring from professional basketball, MacCulloch had a successful pinball career. He was inducted into the Manitoba Sports Hall of Fame in 2014.

== Early life ==
A graduate of Shaftesbury High School in Winnipeg, MacCulloch was named Honorable Mention All-America in 1999 as a senior when he averaged 24.7 points, 15.9 rebounds, and a .662 field goal percentage. He later led the NCAA Division I in field goal percentage in his final three years of college at the University of Washington, only the second player ever to accomplish the feat. He was an All-Pac-10 First Team selection in his final two years at Washington. He was drafted by the 76ers in the 2nd round (47th overall) of the 1999 NBA draft.

== Basketball career ==
MacCulloch played four seasons in the NBA before being forced to retire prematurely due to a genetic neuromuscular disorder that affected his feet, Charcot-Marie-Tooth disease. In his first two seasons with the Philadelphia 76ers, MacCulloch played reserve centre, averaging 9.4 minutes, 2.6 rebounds and just under 9 points in 56 and 63 games respectively from 1999 to 2001. In the 2001 off-season, he signed six-year, $33.7 million contract as a free agent with the New Jersey Nets and as their starting centre averaged 9.7 points and 6.1 rebounds a contest. MacCulloch was then traded back to the 76ers for the 2002–2003 season, in which he averaged just under 20 minutes, 9.1 points, and 4.7 rebounds a contest. Due to an inherited neurological disorder, Charcot-Marie-Tooth disease, which affects the peripheral nerves of the hands and feet he went on the injured reserve list at mid-season, did not play the following season, and announced his retirement in September 2004.

MacCulloch played for the Canadian national team of various sorts 93 times, most notably at the 2000 Summer Olympics where the Canadians topped Yugoslavia to win their group only to lose to eventual silver medalist France in the quarterfinals and finish seventh.

In an episode of Chappelle's Show, in a skit where African Americans get their reparations, the Philadelphia 76ers play the New York Knicks but none of the black players are playing, so MacCulloch plays one-on-one, beating Travis Knight.

== Pinball career ==
MacCulloch played pinball whenever he could growing up, at malls, arcades and bowling alleys around town. He began buying up pinball machines when he signed as a free agent with the Nets in 2001 and got his first house. His collection is now greater than 60 pinball and non-pinball arcade games.

MacCulloch has played in several pinball tournaments. He competed in the European pinball championship in Stockholm in 2007, and has played in the PAPA World Pinball Championships since 2005, qualifying in the B Division multiple times. In October 2011, MacCulloch won the Pinball Expo in Chicago, beating world champions Keith Elwin and Lyman Sheats on his way to his first major pinball title and a $3,000 cash prize.

MacCulloch says there are indeed some similarities between pinball and basketball. He relates: "Hand-eye coordination is really important in both, and maintaining your focus is definitely important. I've been in some pressure situations in big [basketball] games, and nerves wouldn't affect me, but I've found that in pinball tournaments, I can't seem to keep those nerves at bay. My heart beats faster, my chest gets tight. Competition is competition, and I thought I'd respond well, but I haven't been able to rein that in yet."

== Career statistics ==
Legend
GP	Games played	GS	Games started	MPG	Minutes per game
FG%	Field goal percentage	3P%	3-point field goal percentage	FT%	Free throw percentage
RPG	Rebounds per game	APG	Assists per game	SPG	Steals per game
BPG	Blocks per game	PPG	Points per game	**Bold**	Career high

=== NBA ===
==== Regular season ====
Year	Team	GP	GS	MPG	FG%	3P%	FT%	RPG	APG	SPG	BPG	PPG
1999–00	Philadelphia	56	6	9.4	.553	–	.519	2.6	.2	.2	.7	3.7
2000–01	Philadelphia	**63**	3	9.5	**.589**	–	.636	2.7	.2	.1	.3	4.1
2001–02	New Jersey	62	**61**	**24.2**	.531	–	**.671**	**6.1**	**1.3**	.4	**1.4**	**9.7**
2002–03	Philadelphia	42	35	19.3	.517	–	**.671**	4.7	.5	**.5**	.8	7.1
Career		223	105	15.4	.541	–	.642	4.0	.5	.3	.8	6.1

==== Playoffs ====
Year	Team	GP	GS	MPG	FG%	3P%	FT%	RPG	APG	SPG	BPG	PPG
2000	Philadelphia	5	0	4.8	**.667**	–	.667	1.8	.0	.0	.0	1.6
2001	Philadelphia	18	0	6.1	.632	–	**.800**	1.6	.2	.0	.2	3.1
2002	New Jersey	**20**	**20**	**19.2**	.491	–	.613	**5.2**	**.7**	**.3**	**1.4**	**6.2**
Career		43	20	12.0	.531	–	.660	3.3	.4	.1	.7	4.3
