= 2001–02 New Jersey Nets season =

NBA professional basketball team season

- Conference champions
- Division champions
- Head coach: Byron Scott
- General manager: Rod Thorn
- Owners: Yankee Global Enterprises LLC
- Arena: Continental Airlines Arena

Results
- Record: 52–30 (.634)
- Place: Division: 1st (Atlantic); Conference: 1st (Eastern)
- Playoff finish: NBA Finals (lost to Lakers 0–4)
- Stats at Basketball Reference

Local media
- Television: WLNY-TV, Fox Sports Net New York
- Radio: WOR

The 2001–02 New Jersey Nets season was the Nets' 35th season in the National Basketball Association, and their 26th season in East Rutherford, New Jersey.

== Season summary ==
=== Off-season ===
This season was notable for the Nets acquiring All-Star point guard Jason Kidd from the Phoenix Suns during the off-season. The Nets received the seventh overall pick in the 2001 NBA draft, and selected power forward Eddie Griffin out of Seton Hall University; however, the team soon traded Griffin to the Houston Rockets in exchange for rookie small forward, and first-round draft pick Richard Jefferson from the University of Arizona, and rookie center Jason Collins out of Stanford University on draft day. The Nets also signed free agent Todd MacCulloch.

=== Regular season ===
With the addition of Kidd, Jefferson, Collins and MacCulloch, the Nets won nine of their first twelve games of the regular season, held a 26–11 record as of January 16, 2002, and then held a 32–15 record at the All-Star break. The team finished in first place in the Atlantic Division with a 52–30 record, their best record since joining the NBA after the ABA–NBA merger in 1976, and earning the first seed in the Eastern Conference. As of the 2025–26 NBA season, this was the only season in which the Nets won 50 or more games.

Kidd was credited for most of the turnaround, as the Nets had finished 26–56 the previous year; Kidd averaged 14.7 points, 7.3 rebounds, 9.9 assists and 2.1 steals per game, led the Nets with 117 three-point field goals, and was named to the All-NBA First Team, and to the NBA All-Defensive First Team. In addition, second-year star Kenyon Martin averaged 14.9 points, 5.3 rebounds and 1.7 blocks per game, while Keith Van Horn provided the team with 14.8 points and 7.5 rebounds per game, along with 101 three-point field goals, and Kerry Kittles, who returned after missing all of the previous season due to knee injuries, contributed 13.4 points and 1.6 steals per game. Meanwhile, Jefferson averaged 9.4 points per game off the bench, and was named to the NBA All-Rookie Second Team, while MacCulloch provided with 9.7 points and 6.1 rebounds per game, Lucious Harris contributed 9.1 points per game, Aaron Williams averaged 7.2 points and 4.1 rebounds per game, and Collins provided with 4.5 points and 3.9 rebounds per game.

During the NBA All-Star Weekend at the First Union Center in Philadelphia, Kidd was selected for the 2002 NBA All-Star Game, as a member of the Eastern Conference All-Star team, while head coach Byron Scott was selected to coach the Eastern Conference. Meanwhile, Martin was selected for the NBA Rookie Challenge Game, as a member of the sophomore team. Kidd also finished in second place in Most Valuable Player voting, behind Tim Duncan of the San Antonio Spurs, while Jefferson finished in second place in Rookie of the Year voting, behind Pau Gasol of the Memphis Grizzlies, and Scott finished in third place in Coach of the Year voting.

The Nets finished 26th in the NBA in home-game attendance, with an attendance of 564,194 at the Continental Airlines Arena during the regular season, which was the fourth-lowest in the league.

=== NBA playoffs ===
In the Eastern Conference first round of the 2002 NBA playoffs, the Nets faced off against the eighth–seeded Indiana Pacers, a team that featured All-Star forward, and 2001–02 Most Improved Player award winner, Jermaine O'Neal, Reggie Miller and Brad Miller. The Nets lost game 1 to the Pacers at home, 89–83 at the Continental Airlines Arena. However, the team managed to win the next two games to take a 2–1 series lead, before losing game 4 to the Pacers on the road, 97–74 at the Conseco Fieldhouse. With the series tied at two games a piece, the Nets won game 5 over the Pacers at the Continental Airlines Arena in double-overtime, 120–109 to win in a hard-fought five-game series; it was the first time that the Nets won an NBA playoff series since the 1983–84 season.

In the Eastern Conference semifinals, the team faced off against the fourth–seeded Charlotte Hornets, who were led by All-Star guard Baron Davis, David Wesley and Elden Campbell. The Hornets were without scoring leader Jamal Mashburn, who was out due to a season-ending lower abdominal strain injury. The Nets took a 2–0 series lead over the Hornets, before losing game 3 on the road, 115–97 at the Charlotte Coliseum. The Nets won the next two games over the Hornets, including a game 5 home win at the Continental Airlines Arena, 103–95 to win the series in five games.

In the Eastern Conference finals, the Nets then faced off against the third–seeded Boston Celtics, who were led by the trio of All-Star guard Paul Pierce, All-Star forward Antoine Walker, and former Nets guard Kenny Anderson. The Nets won game 1 over the Celtics at the Continental Airlines Arena, 104–97, but then lost the next two games, which included a game 3 road loss at the FleetCenter, 94–90 as the Celtics took a 2–1 series lead. However, the Nets managed to win the next three games, including a game 6 win over the Celtics at the FleetCenter, 96–88 to win the series in six games, and advance to the NBA Finals for the first time in franchise history.

In the 2002 NBA Finals, the Nets faced off against the third–seeded, and two-time defending NBA champion Los Angeles Lakers, who were led by All-Star center Shaquille O'Neal, All-Star guard Kobe Bryant, and Derek Fisher. The Nets lost the first two games to the Lakers on the road at the Staples Center, before losing the next two games at home, including a game 4 loss to the Lakers at the Continental Airlines Arena, 113–107, thus losing the series in a four-game sweep, as the Lakers won their third consecutive NBA championship.

=== Aftermath ===
Following the season, Van Horn and MacCulloch were both traded to the Philadelphia 76ers, whom MacCulloch had previously played for.

== Draft picks ==
Round	Pick	Player	Position	Nationality	College
1	7	Eddie Griffin	Forward	United States	Seton Hall
2	35	Brian Scalabrine	Forward	United States	USC

== Roster ==
2001–02 New Jersey Nets roster
Players

Pos.	No.	Player	Height	Weight	DOB	From
G	1	Brandon Armstrong	6 ft 5 in (1.96 m)	188 lb (85 kg)	1980-06-16	Pepperdine
C	35	Jason Collins	7 ft 0 in (2.13 m)	255 lb (116 kg)	1978-12-02	Stanford
F/C	14	Jamie Feick (injured) (IN)	6 ft 9 in (2.06 m)	255 lb (116 kg)	1974-07-03	Michigan State
G	12	Lucious Harris	6 ft 5 in (1.96 m)	190 lb (86 kg)	1970-12-18	Long Beach State
F	24	Richard Jefferson	6 ft 7 in (2.01 m)	222 lb (101 kg)	1980-06-21	Arizona
G	8	Anthony Johnson	6 ft 3 in (1.91 m)	190 lb (86 kg)	1974-10-02	College of Charleston
G	5	Jason Kidd	6 ft 4 in (1.93 m)	204 lb (93 kg)	1973-03-23	California
G	30	Kerry Kittles	6 ft 5 in (1.96 m)	179 lb (81 kg)	1974-06-12	Villanova
C	11	Todd MacCulloch	7 ft 0 in (2.13 m)	280 lb (127 kg)	1976-01-27	Washington
F	13	Donny Marshall	6 ft 7 in (2.01 m)	230 lb (104 kg)	1972-07-17	Connecticut
F	6	Kenyon Martin	6 ft 9 in (2.06 m)	234 lb (106 kg)	1977-12-30	Cincinnati
F	21	Brian Scalabrine	6 ft 9 in (2.06 m)	241 lb (109 kg)	1978-03-18	USC
F	44	Keith Van Horn	6 ft 10 in (2.08 m)	220 lb (100 kg)	1975-10-23	Utah
F/C	34	Aaron Williams	6 ft 9 in (2.06 m)	222 lb (101 kg)	1972-10-02	Xavier

Coaches
Head coach
- Byron Scott
Assistant(s)
- Lawrence Frank
- Eddie Jordan
- Mike O'Koren

Legend
- (DP) Unsigned draft pick
- (FA) Free agent
- (S) Suspended
- (IN) Inactive
- Injured

Roster
Updated: January 7, 2002

=== Roster notes ===
- Forward/center Jamie Feick was on the injured reserve list due to a ruptured Achilles tendon, and missed the entire regular season.

== Regular season ==
=== Standings ===
Atlantic Division	W	L	PCT	GB	Home	Road	Div
y-New Jersey Nets	52	30	.634	–	33–8	19–22	16–8
x-Boston Celtics	49	33	.598	3	27–14	22–19	17–7
x-Orlando Magic	44	38	.537	8	27–14	17–24	12–12
x-Philadelphia 76ers	43	39	.524	9	22–19	21–20	14–11
e-Washington Wizards	37	45	.451	15	22–19	15–26	12–13
e-Miami Heat	36	46	.439	16	18–23	18–23	10–14
e-New York Knicks	30	52	.366	22	19–22	11–30	4–20

#	Eastern Conference				
#	Team	W	L	PCT	GB
1	c-New Jersey Nets	52	30	.634	–
2	y-Detroit Pistons	50	32	.610	2
3	x-Boston Celtics	49	33	.598	3
4	x-Charlotte Hornets	44	38	.537	8
5	x-Orlando Magic	44	38	.537	8
6	x-Philadelphia 76ers	43	39	.524	9
7	x-Toronto Raptors	42	40	.512	10
8	x-Indiana Pacers	42	40	.512	10
9	e-Milwaukee Bucks	41	41	.500	11
10	e-Washington Wizards	37	45	.451	15
11	e-Miami Heat	36	46	.439	16
12	e-Atlanta Hawks	33	49	.402	19
13	e-New York Knicks	30	52	.366	22
14	e-Cleveland Cavaliers	29	53	.354	23
15	e-Chicago Bulls	21	61	.256	31

=== Game log ===
2001–02 game log
Total: 52–30 (home: 33–8; road: 19–22)
October: 2–0 (home: 1–0; road: 1–0)

Game	Date	Team	Score	High points	High rebounds	High assists	Location Attendance	Record
1	October 30	Indiana	W 103–97	Keith Van Horn (26)	Jason Kidd (10)	Jason Kidd (9)	Continental Airlines Arena; 8,749	1–0
2	October 31	@ Boston	W 95–92	Jason Kidd (21)	Todd MacCulloch (12)	Jason Kidd (10)	FleetCenter; 14,158	2–0

November : 8–5 (home: 5–1; road: 3–4)

Game	Date	Team	Score	High points	High rebounds	High assists	Location Attendance	Record
3	November 2	@ Detroit	L 88–102	Richard Jefferson (17)	Kidd, Williams (6)	Jason Kidd (5)	The Palace of Auburn Hills; 22,076	2–1
4	November 3	Charlotte	W 95–85	Keith Van Horn (28)	Keith Van Horn (9)	Jason Kidd (8)	Continental Airlines Arena; 6,532	3–1
5	November 8	Seattle	W 106–94	Todd MacCulloch (29)	Keith Van Horn (12)	Jason Kidd (13)	Continental Airlines Arena; 5,277	4–1
6	November 10	Cleveland	W 87–84	Kenyon Martin (18)	MacCulloch, Van Horn (10)	Three players (4)	Continental Airlines Arena; 5,631	5–1
7	November 13	@ Indiana	W 91–82	Jason Kidd (20)	Keith Van Horn (13)	Jason Kidd (10)	Conseco Fieldhouse; 15,188	6–1
8	November 16	New York	W 109–83	Kenyon Martin (21)	Kenyon Martin (8)	Jason Kidd (15)	Continental Airlines Arena; 15,638	7–1
9	November 17	Philadelphia	L 82–94	Kenyon Martin (16)	Kidd, MacCulloch (9)	Jason Kidd (12)	Continental Airlines Arena; 17,318	7–2
10	November 19	@ Denver	L 96–99 (OT)	Kenyon Martin (28)	Richard Jefferson (8)	Jason Kidd (13)	Pepsi Center; 11,319	7–3
11	November 21	@ Utah	W 90–89 (OT)	Jason Kidd (18)	Todd MacCulloch (11)	Jason Kidd (6)	Delta Center; 17,413	8–3
12	November 22	@ L.A. Clippers	W 95–90	Keith Van Horn (34)	Three players (12)	Jason Kidd (11)	Staples Center; 13,172	9–3
13	November 24	@ Sacramento	L 97–98	Kenyon Martin (20)	Kidd, Van Horn (10)	Jason Kidd (12)	ARCO Arena; 17,317	9–4
14	November 25	@ Golden State	L 85–101	Kenyon Martin (19)	Jason Kidd (8)	Jason Kidd (8)	The Arena in Oakland; 13,129	9–5
15	November 27	Chicago	W 100–68	Keith Van Horn (19)	Todd MacCulloch (13)	Jason Kidd (8)	Continental Airlines Arena; 5,234	10–5

December : 9–5 (home: 4–2; road: 5–3)

Game	Date	Team	Score	High points	High rebounds	High assists	Location Attendance	Record
16	December 1	Boston	L 98–105 (OT)	Jason Kidd (20)	Kidd, Van Horn (9)	Jason Kidd (19)	Continental Airlines Arena; 11,379	10–6
17	December 5	Phoenix	W 106–87	Kerry Kittles (24)	Aaron Williams (11)	Jason Kidd (13)	Continental Airlines Arena; 11,452	11–6
18	December 7	Cleveland	W 96–84	Kerry Kittles (23)	Todd MacCulloch (10)	Jason Kidd (9)	Continental Airlines Arena; 8,209	12–6
19	December 8	@ Milwaukee	L 79–95	Keith Van Horn (15)	Todd MacCulloch (7)	Jason Kidd (6)	Bradley Center; 18,717	12–7
20	December 11	@ Chicago	W 107–93	Lucious Harris (22)	Kenyon Martin (8)	Jason Kidd (9)	United Center; 16,892	13–7
21	December 14	@ Miami	W 95–86	Kerry Kittles (27)	Kidd, Williams (7)	Jason Kidd (11)	American Airlines Arena; 15,212	14–7
22	December 16	@ New York	W 114–96	Kenyon Martin (21)	Kerry Kittles (8)	Jason Kidd (14)	Madison Square Garden; 19,763	15–7
23	December 19	Minnesota	W 117–112 (OT)	Jason Kidd (33)	Keith Van Horn (10)	Jason Kidd (8)	Continental Airlines Arena; 12,810	16–7
24	December 21	@ Indiana	L 94–100	Keith Van Horn (19)	Aaron Williams (9)	Three players (5)	Conseco Fieldhouse; 16,219	16–8
25	December 22	Utah	L 90–104	Keith Van Horn (24)	Keith Van Horn (7)	Jason Kidd (8)	Continental Airlines Arena; 12,960	16–9
26	December 26	@ Cleveland	W 91–89	Jason Kidd (27)	Jason Kidd (10)	Jason Kidd (13)	Gund Arena; 11,394	17–9
27	December 27	@ Detroit	W 88–75	Kenyon Martin (21)	Jason Kidd (7)	Jason Kidd (18)	The Palace of Auburn Hills; 22,076	18–9
28	December 29	Indiana	W 98–93 (OT)	Kerry Kittles (22)	Jason Kidd (15)	Jason Kidd (14)	Continental Airlines Arena; 17,023	19–9
29	December 31	@ Washington	L 76–98	Martin, Van Horn (16)	Jason Kidd (6)	Jason Kidd (11)	MCI Center; 20,674	19–10

January : 11–4 (home: 7–1; road: 4–3)

Game	Date	Team	Score	High points	High rebounds	High assists	Location Attendance	Record
30	January 2	Memphis	W 92–74	Kerry Kittles (18)	Keith Van Horn (12)	Jason Kidd (14)	Continental Airlines Arena; 7,796	20–10
31	January 4	Orlando	L 96–109	Jason Kidd (24)	Keith Van Horn (9)	Three players (5)	Continental Airlines Arena; 14,770	20–11
32	January 5	@ Charlotte	W 89–80	Collins, Kidd (18)	Jason Collins (12)	Jason Kidd (8)	Charlotte Coliseum; 11,476	21–11
33	January 8	Miami	W 104–95	Keith Van Horn (19)	Jason Kidd (6)	Jason Kidd (7)	Continental Airlines Arena; 8,195	22–11
34	January 10	L.A. Clippers	W 108–89	Kerry Kittles (18)	Jason Collins (11)	Jason Kidd (11)	Continental Airlines Arena; 15,039	23–11
35	January 12	@ Orlando	W 91–85	Lucious Harris (20)	Keith Van Horn (11)	Jason Kidd (6)	TD Waterhouse Centre; 14,555	24–11
36	January 14	San Antonio	W 99–97	Kerry Kittles (22)	Kidd, MacCulloch (10)	Jason Kidd (12)	Continental Airlines Arena; 11,091	25–11
37	January 16	Washington	W 111–67	Keith Van Horn (27)	Jason Collins (7)	Jason Kidd (12)	Continental Airlines Arena; 20,049	26–11
38	January 18	@ Toronto	L 77–89	Jason Kidd (19)	Keith Van Horn (11)	Jason Kidd (8)	Air Canada Centre; 19,800	26–12
39	January 19	Houston	W 99–90	Keith Van Horn (22)	Jason Kidd (7)	Jason Kidd (10)	Continental Airlines Arena; 15,061	27–12
40	January 21	@ Dallas	L 105–113	Lucious Harris (23)	Keith Van Horn (15)	Jason Kidd (15)	American Airlines Center; 20,039	27–13
41	January 22	@ San Antonio	W 92–86	Jason Kidd (28)	Jason Kidd (11)	Kidd, Martin (4)	Alamodome; 17,701	28–13
42	January 24	@ Houston	W 103–98	Kenyon Martin (28)	Todd MacCulloch (10)	Jason Kidd (7)	Compaq Center; 10,357	29–13
43	January 26	@ Miami	L 77–90	Kenyon Martin (19)	Kidd, Williams (5)	Jason Kidd (9)	American Airlines Arena; 15,238	29–14
44	January 31	Milwaukee	W 125–100	Three players (21)	Todd MacCulloch (11)	Jason Kidd (13)	Continental Airlines Arena; 13,852	30–14

February : 8–4 (home: 6–2; road: 2–2)

Game	Date	Team	Score	High points	High rebounds	High assists	Location Attendance	Record
45	February 2	Toronto	W 98–91	Jason Kidd (31)	Keith Van Horn (11)	Jason Kidd (10)	Continental Airlines Arena; 20,049	31–14
46	February 4	Sacramento	W 117–83	Keith Van Horn (25)	Keith Van Horn (8)	Jason Kidd (7)	Continental Airlines Arena; 14,840	32–14
47	February 6	Dallas	L 100–112	Kenyon Martin (26)	Kittles, MacCulloch (9)	Jason Kidd (12)	Continental Airlines Arena; 16,179	32–15
All-Star Break
48	February 12	@ Atlanta	L 103–105	Kerry Kittles (20)	Jason Kidd (11)	Jason Kidd (14)	Philips Arena; 9,176	32–16
49	February 14	Detroit	L 80–85	Keith Van Horn (26)	Jason Kidd (14)	Jason Kidd (14)	Continental Airlines Arena; 9,137	32–17
50	February 15	@ Chicago	W 106–81	Aaron Williams (23)	Aaron Williams (9)	Jason Kidd (10)	United Center; 19,505	33–17
51	February 17	Denver	W 98–77	Keith Van Horn (17)	Keith Van Horn (12)	Jason Kidd (10)	Continental Airlines Arena; 12,866	34–17
52	February 19	Golden State	W 123–115	Jason Kidd (26)	Jason Kidd (12)	Jason Kidd (12)	Continental Airlines Arena; 9,184	35–17
53	February 21	@ Washington	W 93–82	Jason Kidd (30)	Keith Van Horn (8)	Jason Kidd (8)	MCI Center; 20,674	36–17
54	February 22	New York	W 115–93	Richard Jefferson (22)	Kidd, Van Horn (7)	Jason Kidd (11)	Continental Airlines Arena; 20,049	37–17
55	February 24	Charlotte	W 95–93	Jason Kidd (21)	Martin, Jefferson (7)	Jason Kidd (15)	Continental Airlines Arena; 15,516	38–17
56	February 27	@ Charlotte	L 85–104	Kidd, Williams (12)	Jason Collins (7)	Jason Kidd (6)	Charlotte Coliseum; 8,737	38–18

March : 9–9 (home: 7–0; road: 2–9)

Game	Date	Team	Score	High points	High rebounds	High assists	Location Attendance	Record
57	March 1	@ Philadelphia	L 102–110	Kerry Kittles (24)	Kenyon Martin (9)	Jason Kidd (9)	First Union Center; 20,869	38–19
58	March 3	Chicago	W 92–84	Jason Collins (17)	Jason Collins (12)	Jason Kidd (9)	Continental Airlines Arena; 13,676	39–19
59	March 5	@ L.A. Lakers	L 92–101	Jason Kidd (19)	Keith Van Horn (14)	Jason Kidd (10)	Staples Center; 18,997	39–20
60	March 6	@ Phoenix	L 87–89	Aaron Williams (18)	Jason Kidd (11)	Jason Kidd (8)	America West Arena; 16,251	39–21
61	March 8	@ Portland	L 73–82	Kenyon Martin (19)	Keith Van Horn (9)	Jason Kidd (7)	Rose Garden Arena; 20,580	39–22
62	March 9	@ Seattle	L 90–96	Keith Van Horn (21)	Kenyon Martin (7)	Jason Kidd (10)	KeyArena; 17,072	39–23
63	March 12	Toronto	W 86–84	Kenyon Martin (16)	Jason Kidd (11)	Jason Kidd (6)	Continental Airlines Arena; 16,105	40–23
64	March 13	@ Boston	L 89–97	Jason Kidd (23)	Jason Kidd (13)	Jason Kidd (8)	FleetCenter; 16,143	40–24
65	March 15	Miami	W 97–78	Keith Van Horn (28)	Jason Kidd (12)	Jason Kidd (14)	Continental Airlines Arena; 15,435	41–24
66	March 17	@ Memphis	W 87–76	Kerry Kittles (19)	Keith Van Horn (13)	Jason Kidd (10)	Pyramid Arena; 15,871	42–24
67	March 19	@ Cleveland	L 97–100	Jason Kidd (30)	Jason Kidd (10)	Jason Kidd (10)	Gund Arena; 12,330	42–25
68	March 20	Portland	W 97–82	Jason Kidd (28)	Jason Kidd (8)	Jason Kidd (11)	Continental Airlines Arena; 12,785	43–25
69	March 22	Milwaukee	W 108–84	Kerry Kittles (21)	Keith Van Horn (10)	Jason Kidd (15)	Continental Airlines Arena; 20,049	44–25
70	March 24	Atlanta	W 116–102	Kidd, Kittles (22)	Richard Jefferson (9)	Jason Kidd (15)	Continental Airlines Arena; 15,522	45–25
71	March 26	@ Atlanta	L 77–103	Richard Jefferson (21)	Jefferson, Van Horn (7)	Kerry Kittles (4)	Philips Arena; 10,405	45–26
72	March 27	@ Philadelphia	W 88–80	Richard Jefferson (20)	Keith Van Horn (11)	Jason Kidd (10)	First Union Center; 20,715	46–26
73	March 30	Philadelphia	W 102–92	Kidd, Van Horn (19)	Keith Van Horn (7)	Jason Kidd (17)	Continental Airlines Arena; 20,049	47–26
74	March 31	@ Minnesota	L 85–86	Lucious Harris (17)	Lucious Harris (6)	Jason Kidd (10)	Target Center; 15,221	47–27

April : 5–3 (home: 3–2; road: 2–1)

Game	Date	Team	Score	High points	High rebounds	High assists	Location Attendance	Record
75	April 3	L.A. Lakers	W 94–92	Kerry Kittles (19)	Martin, MacCulloch (8)	Jason Kidd (11)	Continental Airlines Arena; 20,049	48–27
76	April 5	Orlando	W 110–85	Keith Van Horn (20)	Keith Van Horn (15)	Jason Kidd (10)	Continental Airlines Arena; 20,049	49–27
77	April 7	Boston	L 90–102	Jason Kidd (21)	Kenyon Martin (13)	Jason Kidd (6)	Continental Airlines Arena; 14,952	49–28
78	April 9	Washington	W 101–88	Jason Kidd (21)	Jason Kidd (8)	Jason Kidd (12)	Continental Airlines Arena; 18,554	50–28
79	April 11	@ Orlando	W 101–99 (OT)	Kenyon Martin (26)	Jason Kidd (16)	Kidd, Martin (7)	TD Waterhouse Centre; 16,549	51–28
80	April 14	@ Toronto	L 82–101	Collins, Scalabrine (16)	Brian Scalabrine (9)	Anthony Johnson (5)	Air Canada Centre; 19,800	51–29
81	April 16	Detroit	L 98–103	Kerry Kittles (30)	Aaron Williams (8)	Jason Kidd (11)	Continental Airlines Arena; 15,084	51–30
82	April 17	@ New York	W 99–94	Four players (13)	Keith Van Horn (8)	Jason Kidd (5)	Madison Square Garden; 19,763	52–30

2001–02 schedule

== Playoffs ==
2002 playoff game log
First round: 3–2 (home: 2–1; road: 1–1)

Game	Date	Team	Score	High points	High rebounds	High assists	Location Attendance	Series
1	April 20	Indiana	L 83–89	Jason Kidd (26)	Kenyon Martin (13)	Jason Kidd (9)	Continental Airlines Arena; 18,555	0–1
2	April 22	Indiana	W 95–79	Jason Kidd (20)	Jason Kidd (10)	Jason Kidd (9)	Continental Airlines Arena; 20,049	1–1
3	April 26	@ Indiana	W 85–84	Jason Kidd (24)	Keith Van Horn (12)	Jason Kidd (6)	Conseco Fieldhouse; 18,345	2–1
4	April 30	@ Indiana	L 74–97	Kenyon Martin (13)	Kenyon Martin (6)	Jason Kidd (6)	Conseco Fieldhouse; 18,345	2–2
5	May 2	Indiana	W 120–109 (2OT)	Jason Kidd (31)	Kidd, Martin (8)	Jason Kidd (7)	Continental Airlines Arena; 20,049	3–2

Conference semifinals: 4–1 (home: 3–0; road: 1–1)

Game	Date	Team	Score	High points	High rebounds	High assists	Location Attendance	Series
1	May 5	Charlotte	W 99–93	Jason Kidd (21)	Jason Kidd (7)	Jason Kidd (7)	Continental Airlines Arena; 19,071	1–0
2	May 7	Charlotte	W 102–88	Lucious Harris (24)	Keith Van Horn (11)	Jason Kidd (6)	Continental Airlines Arena; 20,049	2–0
3	May 9	@ Charlotte	L 97–115	Richard Jefferson (16)	Collins, Kidd (7)	Jason Kidd (6)	Charlotte Coliseum; 11,363	2–1
4	May 12	@ Charlotte	W 89–79	Jason Kidd (24)	Kidd, Van Horn (11)	Jason Kidd (8)	Charlotte Coliseum; 13,864	3–1
5	May 15	Charlotte	W 103–95	Jason Kidd (23)	Kenyon Martin (6)	Jason Kidd (13)	Continental Airlines Arena; 20,049	4–1

Conference finals: 4–2 (home: 2–1; road: 2–1)

Game	Date	Team	Score	High points	High rebounds	High assists	Location Attendance	Series
1	May 19	Boston	W 104–97	Jason Kidd (18)	Jason Kidd (13)	Jason Kidd (11)	Continental Airlines Arena; 20,049	1–0
2	May 21	Boston	L 86–93	Jason Kidd (23)	Jason Kidd (16)	Jason Kidd (10)	Continental Airlines Arena; 19,850	1–1
3	May 25	@ Boston	L 90–94	Kerry Kittles (19)	Todd MacCulloch (11)	Jason Kidd (11)	FleetCenter; 18,624	1–2
4	May 27	@ Boston	W 94–92	Kerry Kittles (22)	Keith Van Horn (10)	Jason Kidd (9)	FleetCenter; 18,624	2–2
5	May 29	Boston	W 103–92	Kerry Kittles (21)	Jason Kidd (12)	Jason Kidd (7)	Continental Airlines Arena; 19,850	3–2
6	May 31	@ Boston	W 96–88	Kenyon Martin (16)	Jason Kidd (13)	Jason Kidd (13)	FleetCenter; 18,624	4–2

NBA Finals: 0–4 (home: 0–2; road: 0–2)

Game	Date	Team	Score	High points	High rebounds	High assists	Location Attendance	Series
1	June 5	@ L.A. Lakers	L 94–99	Jason Kidd (23)	Jason Kidd (10)	Jason Kidd (10)	Staples Center; 18,997	0–1
2	June 7	@ L.A. Lakers	L 83–106	Kerry Kittles (23)	Jason Kidd (9)	Jason Kidd (7)	Staples Center; 18,997	0–2
3	June 9	L.A. Lakers	L 103–106	Jason Kidd (30)	Kidd, Van Horn (5)	Jason Kidd (10)	Continental Airlines Arena; 19,215	0–3
4	June 12	L.A. Lakers	L 107–113	Kenyon Martin (35)	Kenyon Martin (11)	Jason Kidd (12)	Continental Airlines Arena; 19,296	0–4

2002 schedule

== NBA Finals ==
=== Summary ===
The following scoring summary is written in a line score format, except that the quarter numbers are replaced by game numbers.

Team	Game 1	Game 2	Game 3	Game 4	Wins
Los Angeles (West)	99	106	106	113	4
New Jersey (East)	94	83	103	107	0

=== Aspects ===
Amid tensions between co-captains Shaquille O'Neal and Kobe Bryant, the franchise had another stellar season, finishing 58–24 (.707), good for second in the Pacific Division and earning the third seed in the Western Conference. Bryant and O'Neal were voted starters in the 2002 NBA All-Star Game, where Bryant won the game MVP trophy in his hometown Philadelphia. The duo appeared on the All-NBA First Team and Bryant was honored with an NBA All-Defensive Second Team selection.

Entering the 2001–02 season, the New Jersey Nets were enduring a three-year playoff drought and had a 73–141 record over that span. In 1999, the Nets hired Rod Thorn as team president and immediately, he hired the recently retired Byron Scott to coach New Jersey. Thorn then dealt for Stephon Marbury in a three-team trade with the Milwaukee Bucks and Minnesota Timberwolves, trading Sam Cassell away to the Bucks. Due to the Nets' 31–51 season in 1999–00 season, they had the first overall pick in the 2000 NBA draft, which they used to select power forward Kenyon Martin out of the University of Cincinnati. Despite the reshuffling of the roster and a Rookie of the Year season for Martin, New Jersey struggled, ending the season with a 26–56 (.317) record, and were bestowed the 7th pick in the upcoming Draft.

With another lottery pick, Thorn dealt it to the Houston Rockets for draftees Richard Jefferson, Jason Collins and Brandon Armstrong. The next day, Phoenix Suns owner Jerry Colangelo announced a franchise-shaking trade; Phoenix would swap their point guard Jason Kidd for his New Jersey counterpart Stephon Marbury.

With the Princeton offense installed from the coaching staff, the Nets rebounded to a 52–30 (.634) mark, a twenty-six-win improvement from the last season, and clinched the number-one seed in the Eastern Conference. Kidd finished the season awarded with first team spots on both the All-NBA and All-Defensive Teams and was selected for his fifth All-Star game. He also finished runner-up to San Antonio Spurs power forward Tim Duncan in the Most Valuable Player voting. Richard Jefferson was an NBA All-Rookie Second Team selection and Thorn, the architect of the franchise's resurgence, was awarded NBA Executive of the Year.

=== Game One ===
Los Angeles's Staples Center sold out for the inaugural game of the 2002 NBA Finals, with nearly 19,000 on hand. The Nets trotted out a lineup of Kidd, Kittles, Martin, Van Horn and MacCulloth to hold up against the two-time defending and heavily favored champions. The Lakers brought out Derek Fisher, Rick Fox, Shaquille O'Neal, Robert Horry, and Kobe Bryant, who drew the assignment of guarding Kidd. New Jersey head coach Byron Scott, a member of the Showtime Lakers, received a standing ovation.

Taking advantage of a late arrival to the arena by New Jersey, L.A. dominated the first 17 minutes of play with a 42–19 score by the 6:41 mark in the second quarter. From that point on, the Nets went on a 17–6 to close the lead to a respectable 12. They had no answer for O'Neal, however, who had bullied MacCulloth into 16 points and 6 rebounds by half-time. The Nets outscored the Lakers in the third but stood steadfast as Bryant scored 11 of his 22 in the third.

" You can't dig yourself a hole, get down by 19 or 20 points and expect to win. We just dug ourselves a hole against the champions. "

— Lucious Harris, Sports Illustrated

New Jersey battled back, coming as close as three several times in the final quarter. Desperate to take the lead, they utilized the "Hack-a-Shaq" strategy midway in the fourth. It backfired, as O'Neal was 5–8 from the free throw line and had 16 points and 9 rebounds in the period alone.

New Jersey was doomed by their late start and poor shooting. The Nets, who shot 45% from the field and 74% on free throws were 39% and 57% respectively. Kidd finished with a triple–double, the 26th in Finals history and the first since Charles Barkley's in the 1993 series.

Recap

Team	1st Qt.	2nd Qt.	3rd Qt.	4th Qt.	Total
New Jersey	14	22	27	31	91
Los Angeles	29	19	24	27	99

=== Game Two ===
The second game was more of a statement as the Lakers clobbered the Nets by a score of 106-83 thanks to Shaquille O'Neal's 40 points, 12 rebounds, and 8 assists.

Recap

Team	1st Qt.	2nd Qt.	3rd Qt.	4th Qt.	Total
New Jersey	21	22	18	22	83
Los Angeles	27	22	28	29	106

=== Game Three ===
Game Three would prove to a hard-fought game (much like the first game of the series) as the Lakers and Nets would trade leads throughout the game but thanks to Kobe Bryant's 36 points, 6 rebounds, 4 assists and 2 blocks the Lakers prevail by a score of 106–103 to take a commanding 3–0 series lead.

Recap

Team	1st Qt.	2nd Qt.	3rd Qt.	4th Qt.	Total
Los Angeles	31	21	26	28	106
New Jersey	23	23	32	25	103

=== Game Four ===
Despite this being a hard-fought battle (much like the previous game and as well as the first game of the series) the Lakers still won game four and the championship, giving Phil Jackson his Red Auerbach-tying ninth title and the Lakers their third consecutive title (and fourteenth overall) making them the fifth team to win three consecutive titles and denying the Nets their first ever championship since the franchise moved to East Rutherford.

Recap

Team	1st Qt.	2nd Qt.	3rd Qt.	4th Qt.	Total
Los Angeles	27	31	26	29	113
New Jersey	34	23	23	27	107

== Player statistics ==
Legend
GP	Games played	GS	Games started	MPG	Minutes per game
FG%	Field-goal percentage	3P%	3-point field-goal percentage	FT%	Free-throw percentage
RPG	Rebounds per game	APG	Assists per game	SPG	Steals per game
BPG	Blocks per game	PPG	Points per game

=== Regular season statistics ===
As of April 17, 2002

New Jersey Nets statistics
Player	GP	GS	MPG	FG%	3P%	FT%	RPG	APG	SPG	BPG	PPG
Brandon Armstrong	35	0	5.6	.318	.294	.500	.5	.2	.2	.0	1.8
Jason Collins	77	9	18.3	.421	.500	.701	3.9	1.1	.4	.6	4.5
Derrick Dial	25	0	10.0	.319	.000	.722	1.8	1.2	.3	.2	2.9
Steve Goodrich	9	0	5.6	.200	—	.500	.6	.6	.1	.2	.6
Lucious Harris	74	0	21.0	.464	.373	.842	2.8	1.6	.7	.1	9.1
Richard Jefferson	79	9	24.3	.457	.232	.713	3.7	1.8	.8	.6	9.4
Anthony Johnson	34	0	10.8	.411	.333	.640	.9	1.4	.9	.0	2.8
Jason Kidd	82	82	37.3	.391	.321	.814	7.3	9.9	2.1	.2	14.7
Kerry Kittles	82	82	31.7	.466	.405	.744	3.4	2.6	1.6	.4	13.4
Todd MacCulloch	62	61	24.2	.531	—	.671	6.1	1.3	.4	1.4	9.7
Donny Marshall	20	0	5.9	.276	.500	.667	1.1	.3	.2	.0	1.5
Kenyon Martin	73	73	34.3	.463	.224	.678	5.3	2.6	1.2	1.7	14.9
Brian Scalabrine	28	0	10.4	.343	.300	.733	1.8	.8	.3	.1	2.1
Reggie Slater	4	0	2.5	1.000	—	1.000	.5	.0	.0	.0	1.3
Keith Van Horn	81	81	30.4	.433	.345	.800	7.5	2.0	.8	.5	14.8
Aaron Williams	82	13	18.9	.526	.000	.699	4.1	.9	.4	.9	7.2

=== Playoff statistics ===
As of June 12, 2002

New Jersey Nets statistics
Player	GP	GS	MPG	FG%	3P%	FT%	RPG	APG	SPG	BPG	PPG
Jason Collins	17	0	13.4	.364	—	.658	2.4	.4	.3	.4	2.9
Lucious Harris	20	0	20.9	.489	.364	.830	2.7	.9	.7	.0	8.9
Richard Jefferson	20	0	22.1	.465	.000	.550	4.6	1.3	.6	.5	7.0
Anthony Johnson	19	0	8.5	.377	.100	.818	.7	1.1	.3	.0	2.6
Jason Kidd	20	20	40.2	.415	.189	.808	8.2	9.1	1.7	.4	19.6
Kerry Kittles	20	20	29.0	.435	.265	.778	3.2	2.3	1.6	.5	12.1
Todd MacCulloch	20	20	19.2	.491	—	.613	5.2	.7	.3	1.4	6.2
Donny Marshall	7	0	2.0	.200	.000	1.000	.0	.0	.0	.0	.4
Kenyon Martin	20	20	37.5	.424	.222	.691	5.8	2.9	1.2	1.3	16.8
Brian Scalabrine	6	0	2.3	.333	.000	—	.5	.0	.0	.2	.3
Keith Van Horn	20	20	32.2	.402	.440	.714	6.7	2.1	1.0	.5	13.3
Aaron Williams	20	0	20.8	.479	.000	.826	3.5	.8	.4	.8	6.5

== Awards and records ==
- Rod Thorn, NBA Executive of the Year
- Jason Kidd, All-NBA First Team
- Jason Kidd, NBA All-Defensive First Team
- Richard Jefferson, NBA All-Rookie Team Second Team
