= Victor Alexander =

American basketball player (born 1969)

Personal information
- Born: August 31, 1969 (age 57) Detroit, Michigan, U.S.
- Listed height: 6 ft 10 in (2.08 m)
- Listed weight: 273 lb (124 kg)

Career information
- High school: Denby (Detroit, Michigan)
- College: Iowa State (1987–1991)
- NBA draft: 1991: 1st round, 17th overall pick
- Drafted by: Golden State Warriors
- Playing career: 1991–2005
- Position: Center / power forward
- Number: 52, 9

Career history
- 1991–1995: Golden State Warriors
- 1996: Estudiantes de Olavarría
- 1996–1997: AEK Athens
- 1997: Atléticos de San Germán
- 1997–1998: AEK Athens
- 1998–1999: Maccabi Tel Aviv
- 1999–2000: PAOK
- 2000–2001: Tau Ceramica
- 2001–2002: Detroit Pistons
- 2002–2003: CSKA Moscow
- 2003: Unicaja Málaga
- 2003–2004: CSKA Moscow
- 2004–2005: Al Qadsia

Career highlights
- All-EuroLeague First Team (2003); Greek League All-Star (1996 II); 2× Russian Championship champion (2003, 2004); Israeli League champion (1999); Israeli Cup winner (1999); First-team All-Big Eight (1991)

Career NBA statistics
- Points: 2,542 (8.9 ppg)
- Rebounds: 1,384 (4.8 rpg)
- Assists: 257 (0.9 apg)
- Stats at NBA.com
- Stats at Basketball Reference
Medals
Men's basketball
Representing United States
Summer Universiade
Gold medal – first place	1989 Duisburg	National team

Victor Joe Alexander (born August 31, 1969) is an American former professional basketball player. Listed at 6 ft 10 in (2.08 m) tall, and 273 pounds (124 kg) in weight, he played as a center and power forward. Alexander played five seasons in the National Basketball Association (NBA) for the Golden State Warriors and Detroit Pistons. He also found success in Europe, playing in the top leagues in Greece, Israel, Spain and Russia.

== College career ==
Alexander was considered one of the top low-post scorers in Iowa State history. The burly center was named a first-team All-Big Eight Conference choice in 1989 and 1991, and his 1,892 career points scored ranks fourth all-time in the school's history. He led the Big Eight in field goal percentage in 1991, at 65.9 percent. As of 2010, Alexander still held the Iowa State University career highest field goal percentage record (min. 200 made), at 61.1 percent (778 out of 1,274).

In 2017, Alexander was inducted into the Iowa State Hall of Fame as well their all century basketball team.

Collegiate Statistics
Year	Games	Min	FG	FGA	3P	3PA	FT	FTA	REB	PF	AST	TO	BLK	STL	PTS
1987–88 Iowa St	23	120	18	30	0	0	3	6	32	19	4	7	4	2	39
1988–89 Iowa St	29	923	240	412	0	0	97	149	255	86	35	81	30	26	577
1989–90 Iowa St	28	887	226	386	0	1	100	173	243	64	43	35	34	15	552
1990–91 Iowa St	31	1020	294	446	0	0	136	201	280	78	37	85	51	35	724
Total	111	2950	778	1274	0	1	336	529	810	247	119	208	120	78	1892

== Professional career ==
=== NBA ===
Alexander was selected by the Golden State Warriors, in the first round (17th pick overall) of the 1991 NBA draft, after playing college basketball at Iowa State University. Alexander played five seasons in the National Basketball Association (NBA), mainly with the Golden State Warriors, from 1991 to 1995. The Warriors traded him to the Toronto Raptors, along with other players, for B. J. Armstrong, in 1995, but he never officially played for the Raptors.

Toronto traded him first to the Cleveland Cavaliers (he failed the physical and the trade was rescinded), and eventually to the New York Knicks. The Knicks waived Alexander before he played for them. He had a brief stint with the Detroit Pistons, during the 2001–02 season. In his NBA career, Alexander played in a total of 286 games, and averaged 8.9 points per game.

=== Europe ===
Alexander also played overseas, for top teams in Greece (AEK Athens and PAOK), Israel (Maccabi Tel Aviv), Spain (TAU Ceramica) and Russia (CSKA Moscow). During his career in Europe, he played in 115 EuroLeague games, over 6 EuroLeague seasons. His performances with CSKA earned him an All-EuroLeague First Team selection, in 2003.

== Career statistics ==
Legend
GP	Games played	GS	Games started	MPG	Minutes per game
FG%	Field-goal percentage	3P%	3-point field-goal percentage	FT%	Free-throw percentage
RPG	Rebounds per game	APG	Assists per game	SPG	Steals per game
BPG	Blocks per game	PPG	Points per game	PIR	Performance index rating
**Bold**	Career high

=== EuroLeague ===
Year	Team	GP	GS	MPG	FG%	3P%	FT%	RPG	APG	SPG	BPG	PPG	PIR
2000–01	Tau Ceramica	**22**	**20**	30.0	.400	.250	**.740**	**7.0**	.7	.9	**.4**	13.5	14.5
2002–03	CSKA Moscow	15	14	**30.4**	.415	.308	.674	6.6	**1.1**	**1.1**	.1	**16.6**	**16.0**
2003–04	CSKA Moscow	19	15	18.2	**.525**	**.500**	.689	3.2	.3	.7	.3	9.3	7.9
Career		56	49	26.1	.460	.370	.707	5.6	.7	.9	.1	12.9	12.7

=== Regular season ===
Year	Team	GP	GS	MPG	FG%	3P%	FT%	RPG	APG	SPG	BPG	PPG
1991–92	Golden State	**80**	28	16.9	.529	.000	**.691**	4.2	.4	**.6**	**.8**	7.4
1992–93	Golden State	72	**59**	24.3	.516	**.455**	.685	**5.8**	**1.3**	.5	.7	**11.2**
1993–94	Golden State	69	39	19.1	**.530**	.154	.527	4.5	1.0	.4	.5	8.7
1994–95	Golden State	50	29	**24.7**	.515	.240	.600	**5.8**	1.2	**.6**	.6	10.0
2001–02	Detroit	15	0	6.5	.353	.000	.500	1.9	.4	.0	.1	2.7
Career		286	155	20.1	.518	.286	.634	4.8	.9	.5	.6	8.9

=== Playoffs ===
Year	Team	GP	GS	MPG	FG%	3P%	FT%	RPG	APG	SPG	BPG	PPG
1992	Golden State	**4**	0	**6.0**	**.600**	.000	**1.000**	**1.5**	**.3**	**.5**	.0	**1.8**
2002	Detroit	1	0	3.0	.000	.000	.000	1.0	.0	.0	.0	0.0
Career		5	0	5.4	.500	.000	1.000	1.4	.2	.4	.0	1.4
