= 2001–02 Detroit Pistons season =

NBA team season

- Division champions
- Head coach: Rick Carlisle
- President: Joe Dumars
- General manager: Joe Dumars
- Owner: Bill Davidson
- Arena: The Palace of Auburn Hills

Results
- Record: 50–32 (.610)
- Place: Division: 1st (Central); Conference: 2nd (Eastern)
- Playoff finish: Conference semifinals (lost to Celtics 1–4)
- Stats at Basketball Reference

The 2001–02 Detroit Pistons season was the 61st season for the Detroit Pistons, their 54th season in the National Basketball Association, and their 45th season in Detroit, Michigan.

== Season summary ==
=== Off-season ===
After missing the NBA playoffs the previous season, the Pistons received the ninth overall pick in the 2001 NBA draft, and selected small forward Rodney White from the University of Charlotte. During the off-season, the team acquired Clifford Robinson from the Phoenix Suns, acquired three-point specialist Jon Barry from the Sacramento Kings, signed free agent Damon Jones, and hired Rick Carlisle as their new head coach.

For the season, the Pistons updated their primary logo of a flaming horse head above a basketball, replacing the colors teal, burgundy, black and golden yellow to their traditional color scheme of blue and red; the team also added dark navy blue to their color scheme, plus keeping white and silver from their previous color scheme. The team's primary logo featured a dark navy blue and silver horse head with a silver flaming mane surrounded by a red outline, above the team name "Pistons" in white letters with blue shadows and a dark navy blue outline, and silver flaming tailpipes with a red outline. The flaming horse head and team name are in front of a red basketball with silver seams, surrounded by a blue circle with a silver outline featuring the city name "Detroit" in white letters.

The team also redesigned their home and road uniforms, which featured a V-shaped collar, and their new alternate logo of a flaming horse head above a half-red, and half-dark navy blue basketball on the left leg of their shorts. The white home uniforms featured the team name "Pistons" on the front of their jerseys, along with a blue trim, and red and blue side panels with white inlines on their jerseys and shorts. The road uniforms were changed from teal to blue, and featured the city name "Detroit", a red trim, and red side panels with white inlines.

The team's updated primary logo, and new uniforms would both remain in use until 2005, where they would replace the flaming horse head above a basketball with their newer alternate logo of a blue letter "P" on the left leg of their shorts.

=== Regular season ===
Under Carlisle, and with the addition of Robinson and Barry, the Pistons won 14 of their first 20 games of the regular season, but then suffered a seven-game losing streak in December as part of a 5–14 stretch to fall to a 19–20 record. Unlike previous seasons during the 1990s, the Pistons recovered from the tough stretch to win 15 of their next 18 games. After holding a 26–21 record at the All-Star break, the Pistons won 24 of their final 35 games of the season, winning the Central Division title with a 50–32 record, the franchise's first Division title since the 1989–90 season, thanks to a 123–89 home victory over the Milwaukee Bucks on the final day of the regular season. The Pistons earned the second seed in the Eastern Conference, and returned to the NBA playoffs after a one-year absence. Carlisle was named the NBA Coach of the Year, after leading the Pistons to an 18-game improvement over the previous season.

Jerry Stackhouse averaged 21.4 points and 5.3 assists per game, while Robinson averaged 14.6 points and 4.8 rebounds per game, contributed 115 three-point field goals, and was named to the NBA All-Defensive Second Team, and Corliss Williamson provided the team with 13.6 points and 4.1 rebounds per game off the bench, and was named the NBA Sixth Man of the Year. In addition, Chucky Atkins contributed 12.1 points and 3.3 assists per game, and led the Pistons with 138 three-point field goals, while Ben Wallace averaged 7.6 points, 13.0 rebounds, 1.7 steals and 3.5 blocks per game, and was named the NBA Defensive Player of the Year, and was also named to the All-NBA Third Team, and to the NBA All-Defensive First Team. Meanwhile, Barry contributed 9.0 points per game and 121 three-point field goals, while rookie center Željko Rebrača provided with 6.9 points, 3.9 rebounds and 1.0 blocks per game, and was named to the NBA All-Rookie Second Team, Dana Barros averaged 6.7 points and 2.7 assists per game, but only played just 29 games due to injury, Jones contributed 5.1 points per game, and starting small forward Michael Curry averaged 4.0 points per game.

During the NBA All-Star weekend at the First Union Center in Philadelphia, Pennsylvania, Rebrača was selected for the NBA Rookie Challenge Game, as a member of the Rookies team; despite a stellar season, Stackhouse was not selected for the 2002 NBA All-Star Game. Wallace finished in tenth place in Most Valuable Player voting, and also finished in second place in Most Improved Player voting, behind Jermaine O'Neal of the Indiana Pacers. The Pistons finished eleventh in the NBA in home-game attendance, with an attendance of 760,807 at The Palace of Auburn Hills during the regular season.

=== NBA playoffs ===
In the Eastern Conference First Round of the 2002 NBA playoffs, the Pistons faced off against the 7th–seeded Toronto Raptors, a team that featured All-Star center Antonio Davis, second-year forward Morris Peterson, and Alvin Williams. The Raptors were without All-Star guard Vince Carter, who was out due to a season-ending left knee injury. The Pistons won the first two games over the Raptors at home at The Palace of Auburn Hills, but then lost the next two games on the road, which included a Game 4 loss to the Raptors at the Air Canada Centre, 89–83. With the series tied at 2–2, the Pistons won Game 5 over the Raptors at The Palace of Auburn Hills, 85–82 to win in a hard-fought five-game series, and advance to the second round of the NBA playoffs for the first time since the 1990–91 season.

In the Eastern Conference Semi-finals, the team faced off against the 3rd–seeded Boston Celtics, who were led by the trio of All-Star guard Paul Pierce, All-Star forward Antoine Walker, and Kenny Anderson. The Pistons won Game 1 over the Celtics at The Palace of Auburn Hills, 96–84, before losing Game 2 at home by a score of 85–77. The Pistons lost the next two games to the Celtics on the road, including a Game 4 loss at the FleetCenter, 90–79, as the Celtics took a 3–1 series lead. The Pistons lost Game 5 to the Celtics at The Palace of Auburn Hills, 90–81, thus losing the series in five games.

=== Aftermath ===
Following the season, Stackhouse was traded to the Washington Wizards after four in a half seasons with the Pistons, while White was traded to the Denver Nuggets, and Barros was released to free agency.

== Draft picks ==
Round	Pick	Player	Position	Nationality	College
1	9	Rodney White	SF/PF	United States	North Carolina-Charlotte
2	37	Mehmet Okur	C/PF	Turkey	

== Roster ==
2001–02 Detroit Pistons roster
Players

Pos.	No.	Player	Height	Weight	DOB	From
C	9	Victor Alexander	6 ft 9 in (2.06 m)	265 lb (120 kg)	1969–08–31	Iowa State
G	7	Chucky Atkins	5 ft 11 in (1.80 m)	160 lb (73 kg)	1974–08–14	South Florida
G	1	Dana Barros	5 ft 11 in (1.80 m)	163 lb (74 kg)	1967–04–13	Boston College
G	20	Jon Barry	6 ft 4 in (1.93 m)	195 lb (88 kg)	1969–07–25	Georgia Tech
F	35	Brian Cardinal	6 ft 8 in (2.03 m)	245 lb (111 kg)	1977–05–02	Purdue
G/F	12	Michael Curry	6 ft 5 in (1.96 m)	210 lb (95 kg)	1968–08–22	Georgia Southern
G	14	Damon Jones	6 ft 3 in (1.91 m)	185 lb (84 kg)	1976–08–25	Houston
C	31	Mikki Moore	6 ft 11 in (2.11 m)	225 lb (102 kg)	1975–11–04	Nebraska
C	39	Željko Rebrača	7 ft 0 in (2.13 m)	257 lb (117 kg)	1972–04–09	Serbia
F	30	Clifford Robinson	6 ft 10 in (2.08 m)	225 lb (102 kg)	1966–12–16	Connecticut
G/F	42	Jerry Stackhouse	6 ft 6 in (1.98 m)	218 lb (99 kg)	1974–11–05	North Carolina
C	44	Ratko Varda	7 ft 1 in (2.16 m)	247 lb (112 kg)	1979–05–06	Serbia
F/C	3	Ben Wallace	6 ft 9 in (2.06 m)	245 lb (111 kg)	1974–09–10	Virginia Union
F	5	Rodney White	6 ft 9 in (2.06 m)	238 lb (108 kg)	1980–06–28	Charlotte
F	34	Corliss Williamson	6 ft 7 in (2.01 m)	245 lb (111 kg)	1973–12–04	Arkansas

Coaches
Head coach
- Rick Carlisle
Assistant(s)
- Tony Brown
- Kevin O'Neill
- Bob Ociepka
- Chad Forcier
- Mike Abdenour (trainer)

Legend
- (DP) Unsigned draft pick
- (FA) Free agent
- (S) Suspended
- Injured

Roster
Updated: October 29, 2001

== Regular season ==
=== Season standings ===
Central Division	W	L	PCT	GB	Home	Road	Div
y-Detroit Pistons	50	32	.610	–	26–15	24–17	20–8
x-Charlotte Hornets	44	38	.537	6	21–20	23–18	17–11
x-Toronto Raptors	42	40	.512	8	24–17	18–23	17–11
x-Indiana Pacers	42	40	.512	8	25–16	17–24	13–15
e-Milwaukee Bucks	41	41	.500	9	25–16	16–25	17–11
e-Atlanta Hawks	33	49	.402	17	23–18	10–31	11–17
e-Cleveland Cavaliers	29	53	.354	21	20–21	9–32	12–16
e-Chicago Bulls	21	61	.256	29	14–27	7–34	5–23

#	Eastern Conference				
#	Team	W	L	PCT	GB
1	c-New Jersey Nets	52	30	.634	–
2	y-Detroit Pistons	50	32	.610	2
3	x-Boston Celtics	49	33	.598	3
4	x-Charlotte Hornets	44	38	.537	8
5	x-Orlando Magic	44	38	.537	8
6	x-Philadelphia 76ers	43	39	.524	9
7	x-Toronto Raptors	42	40	.512	10
8	x-Indiana Pacers	42	40	.512	10
9	e-Milwaukee Bucks	41	41	.500	11
10	e-Washington Wizards	37	45	.451	15
11	e-Miami Heat	36	46	.439	16
12	e-Atlanta Hawks	33	49	.402	19
13	e-New York Knicks	30	52	.366	22
14	e-Cleveland Cavaliers	29	53	.354	23
15	e-Chicago Bulls	21	61	.256	31

z - clinched division title
y - clinched division title
x - clinched playoff spot

=== Game log ===
2001–02 game log
Total: 50-32 (Home: 26–15; Road: 24–17)
October: 0–1 (home: 0–0; road: 0–1)

Game	Date	Team	Score	High points	High rebounds	High assists	Location Attendance	Record
1	October 30	@ Dallas	L 87–94	Jerry Stackhouse (27)	Ben Wallace (12)	Jerry Stackhouse (6)	American Airlines Center; 19,200	0–1

November: 10–4 (home: 5–2; road: 5–2)

Game	Date	Team	Score	High points	High rebounds	High assists	Location Attendance	Record
2	November 1	@ Memphis	W 90–80	Jerry Stackhouse (34)	Ben Wallace (11)	Dana Barros (7)	Pyramid Arena; 19,405	1–1
3	November 2	New Jersey	W 102–88	Jerry Stackhouse (24)	Ben Wallace (10)	Dana Barros (5)	The Palace of Auburn Hills; 22,076	2–1
4	November 4	Washington	W 100–78	Jerry Stackhouse (28)	Ben Wallace (12)	Dana Barros (6)	The Palace of Auburn Hills; 22,076	3–1
5	November 7	@ Chicago	W 97–73	Clifford Robinson (23)	Ben Wallace (12)	Jerry Stackhouse (8)	United Center; 17,023	4–1
6	November 11	Portland	L 98–100	Jerry Stackhouse (29)	Ben Wallace (9)	Jerry Stackhouse (7)	The Palace of Auburn Hills; 13,671	4–2
7	November 15	Dallas	W 115–89	Jerry Stackhouse (28)	Ben Wallace (12)	Jerry Stackhouse (8)	The Palace of Auburn Hills; 13,445	5–2
8	November 17	Indiana	W 104–98	Jerry Stackhouse (18)	Stackhouse & Wallace (8)	Jerry Stackhouse (6)	The Palace of Auburn Hills; 22,076	6–2
9	November 20	@ Toronto	W 88–84	Clifford Robinson (22)	Ben Wallace (13)	Dana Barros (7)	Air Canada Centre; 19,800	7–2
10	November 21	@ Philadelphia	L 89–94	Clifford Robinson (35)	Ben Wallace (12)	Dana Barros (6)	First Union Center; 20,315	7–3
11	November 23	@ Atlanta	L 99–106	Jon Barry (25)	Wallace & Robinson (10)	Corliss Williamson (5)	Philips Arena; 10,717	7–4
12	November 24	Memphis	W 91–84	Clifford Robinson (23)	Ben Wallace (11)	Chucky Atkins (5)	The Palace of Auburn Hills; 15,256	8–4
13	November 26	@ Orlando	W 105–100	Clifford Robinson (30)	Wallace & Robinson (10)	3 players tied (4)	TD Waterhouse Centre; 12,510	9–4
14	November 28	Charlotte	L 96–104	Jerry Stackhouse (26)	Ben Wallace (9)	Chucky Atkins (6)	The Palace of Auburn Hills; 14,542	9–5
15	November 30	@ Charlotte	W 110–105	Jerry Stackhouse (31)	Ben Wallace (13)	Chucky Atkins (9)	Charlotte Coliseum; 8,727	10–5

December: 5–8 (home: 4–1; road: 1–7)

Game	Date	Team	Score	High points	High rebounds	High assists	Location Attendance	Record
16	December 1	@ New York	W 100–97	Jerry Stackhouse (25)	Ben Wallace (9)	Jerry Stackhouse (9)	Madison Square Garden; 19,763	11–5
17	December 4	@ Cleveland	L 88–100	Corliss Williamson (19)	Željko Rebrača (7)	Chucky Atkins (10)	Gund Arena; 13,375	11–6
18	December 5	Seattle	W 95–91	Chucky Atkins (23)	3 players tied (7)	Jerry Stackhouse (11)	The Palace of Auburn Hills; 14,474	12–6
19	December 9	Houston	W 105–77	Jon Barry (15)	Ben Wallace (18)	Jon Barry (7)	The Palace of Auburn Hills; 17,751	13–6
20	December 13	New York	W 99–97	Corliss Williamson (24)	Ben Wallace (13)	Jerry Stackhouse (13)	The Palace of Auburn Hills; 20,138	14–6
21	December 16	@ L.A. Clippers	L 77–82	Jerry Stackhouse (26)	Ben Wallace (14)	Chucky Atkins (4)	STAPLES Center; 16,416	14–7
22	December 18	@ Sacramento	L 98–102	Jerry Stackhouse (35)	Ben Wallace (9)	Stackhouse & Barros (4)	ARCO Arena; 17,317	14–8
23	December 19	@ Golden State	L 88–101	Jerry Stackhouse (21)	Ben Wallace (15)	Jerry Stackhouse (6)	The Arena in Oakland; 12,079	14–9
24	December 21	@ Portland	L 81–83	Jerry Stackhouse (23)	Ben Wallace (10)	Jerry Stackhouse (7)	Rose Garden Arena; 18,522	14–10
25	December 22	@ Seattle	L 89–117	Jerry Stackhouse (23)	Ben Wallace (10)	Jerry Stackhouse (7)	KeyArena at Seattle Center; 14,553	14–11
26	December 27	New Jersey	L 75–88	Jerry Stackhouse (16)	Ben Wallace (15)	Jerry Stackhouse (5)	The Palace of Auburn Hills; 22,076	14–12
27	December 28	@ Orlando	L 78–87	Ben Wallace (16)	Ben Wallace (13)	3 players tied (4)	TD Waterhouse Centre; 15,146	14–13
28	December 30	Miami	W 86–80	Jerry Stackhouse (24)	Ben Wallace (15)	Chucky Atkins (4)	The Palace of Auburn Hills; 22,076	15–13

January: 8–7 (home: 5–3; road: 3–4)

Game	Date	Team	Score	High points	High rebounds	High assists	Location Attendance	Record
29	January 2	@ San Antonio	L 85–97	Željko Rebrača (17)	Ben Wallace (12)	Stackhouse & Atkins (4)	Alamodome; 16,648	15–14
30	January 3	@ Houston	L 97–99	Jerry Stackhouse (29)	Ben Wallace (12)	Clifford Robinson (7)	Compaq Center; 10,836	15–15
31	January 5	Cleveland	W 101–91	Jerry Stackhouse (29)	Ben Wallace (14)	Jerry Stackhouse (6)	The Palace of Auburn Hills; 15,194	16–15
32	January 7	@ Minnesota	L 93–109	Jerry Stackhouse (24)	Mikki Moore (6)	Jerry Stackhouse (10)	Target Center; 14,427	16–16
33	January 8	L.A. Lakers	L 92–121	Jerry Stackhouse (27)	Ben Wallace (12)	Jerry Stackhouse (6)	The Palace of Auburn Hills; 22,076	16–17
34	January 11	@ Boston	L 90–104	Jerry Stackhouse (21)	Ben Wallace (11)	Jon Barry (5)	FleetCenter; 15,642	16–18
35	January 12	Charlotte	W 104–76	Jerry Stackhouse (27)	Ben Wallace (16)	Jerry Stackhouse (7)	The Palace of Auburn Hills; 18,788	17–18
36	January 15	Toronto	L 90–92	Jerry Stackhouse (38)	Ben Wallace (18)	Chucky Atkins (7)	The Palace of Auburn Hills; 17,045	17–19
37	January 18	@ Indiana	W 96–93	Jerry Stackhouse (32)	Ben Wallace (11)	Jerry Stackhouse (8)	Conseco Fieldhouse; 16,565	18–19
38	January 19	Boston	W 94–91	Jerry Stackhouse (28)	Ben Wallace (13)	Damon Jones (5)	The Palace of Auburn Hills; 22,076	19–19
39	January 21	Milwaukee	L 79–97	Jerry Stackhouse (19)	Ben Wallace (12)	Damon Jones (5)	The Palace of Auburn Hills; 18,139	19–20
40	January 23	Minnesota	W 104–83	Jerry Stackhouse (40)	Ben Wallace (14)	Clifford Robinson (6)	The Palace of Auburn Hills; 14,623	20–20
41	January 25	@ Atlanta	W 107–90	Chucky Atkins (21)	Ben Wallace (8)	Jerry Stackhouse (7)	Philips Arena; 9,948	21–20
42	January 29	@ Washington	W 89–86	Jerry Stackhouse (24)	Ben Wallace (9)	Jerry Stackhouse (6)	MCI Center; 20,674	22–20
43	January 30	Atlanta	W 88–71	Jerry Stackhouse (32)	Ben Wallace (19)	Jerry Stackhouse (7)	The Palace of Auburn Hills; 12,333	23–20

February: 9–3 (home: 5–2; road: 4–1)

Game	Date	Team	Score	High points	High rebounds	High assists	Location Attendance	Record
44	February 1	Orlando	L 83–85	Jerry Stackhouse (18)	Ben Wallace (18)	Jerry Stackhouse (7)	The Palace of Auburn Hills; 19,627	23–21
45	February 2	@ Cleveland	W 115–107	Jerry Stackhouse (23)	Ben Wallace (11)	Stackhouse & Barry (5)	Gund Arena; 17,476	24–21
46	February 5	Philadelphia	W 86–82	Jerry Stackhouse (29)	Ben Wallace (17)	Chucky Atkins (5)	The Palace of Auburn Hills; 20,378	25–21
47	February 7	L.A. Clippers	W 105–92	Jerry Stackhouse (17)	Ben Wallace (15)	Clifford Robinson (5)	The Palace of Auburn Hills; 15,146	26–21
All-Star Break
48	February 12	Phoenix	L 71–99	Stackhouse & Williamson (10)	Ben Wallace (10)	Barry & Jones (5)	The Palace of Auburn Hills; 13,952	26–22
49	February 14	@ New Jersey	W 85–80	Jerry Stackhouse (22)	Ben Wallace (9)	Jon Barry (6)	Continental Airlines Arena; 9,137	27–22
50	February 15	@ New York	W 101–90	Wallace & Atkins (19)	Ben Wallace (22)	Robinson & Stackhouse (6)	Madison Square Garden; 19,763	28–22
51	February 18	Toronto	W 89–76	Jerry Stackhouse (21)	Ben Wallace (13)	Chucky Atkins (7)	The Palace of Auburn Hills; 18,491	29–22
52	February 20	Washington	W 97–90	Corliss Williamson (22)	Ben Wallace (15)	Jon Barry (5)	The Palace of Auburn Hills; 22,076	30–22
53	February 22	@ Toronto	W 80–72	Clifford Robinson (21)	Ben Wallace (10)	Jerry Stackhouse (7)	Air Canada Centre; 19,800	31–22
54	February 24	@ Milwaukee	L 82–89	Jerry Stackhouse (19)	Ben Wallace (17)	Jerry Stackhouse (6)	Bradley Center; 18,717	31–23
55	February 27	Chicago	W 101–89	Corliss Williamson (24)	Ben Wallace (14)	Jon Barry (10)	The Palace of Auburn Hills; 16,154	32–23

March: 12–6 (home: 5–4; road: 7–2)

Game	Date	Team	Score	High points	High rebounds	High assists	Location Attendance	Record
56	March 1	Orlando	W 110–102	Clifford Robinson (24)	Ben Wallace (11)	Chucky Atkins (6)	The Palace of Auburn Hills; 22,076	33–23
57	March 3	@ Charlotte	W 83–81	Jerry Stackhouse (28)	Corliss Williamson (11)	Jerry Stackhouse (6)	Charlotte Coliseum; 8,632	34–23
58	March 5	Miami	L 91–93	Jerry Stackhouse (22)	Ben Wallace (11)	Jerry Stackhouse (8)	The Palace of Auburn Hills; 16,279	34–24
59	March 7	@ Washington	W 95–92	Corliss Williamson (23)	Ben Wallace (8)	Chucky Atkins (6)	MCI Center; 20,674	35–24
60	March 8	@ Boston	L 92–117	Chucky Atkins (17)	Ben Wallace (15)	Stackhouse & Jones (4)	FleetCenter; 17,405	35–25
61	March 10	Indiana	L 84–89	Corliss Williamson (22)	Ben Wallace (17)	Wallace & Barry (5)	The Palace of Auburn Hills; 22,076	35–26
62	March 13	Cleveland	W 85–84	Chucky Atkins (19)	Ben Wallace (14)	Barry & Atkins (5)	The Palace of Auburn Hills; 14,124	36–26
63	March 15	Utah	L 97–100	Jerry Stackhouse (24)	Ben Wallace (13)	Jerry Stackhouse (6)	The Palace of Auburn Hills; 22,076	36–27
64	March 16	@ Milwaukee	W 102–94	Jerry Stackhouse (25)	Ben Wallace (16)	Jerry Stackhouse (7)	Bradley Center; 18,717	37–27
65	March 18	@ Denver	W 98–91	Jerry Stackhouse (24)	Ben Wallace (15)	Jerry Stackhouse (11)	Pepsi Center; 16,305	38–27
66	March 19	@ Utah	W 94–87	3 players tied (20)	Ben Wallace (15)	Jerry Stackhouse (4)	Delta Center; 19,559	39–27
67	March 21	@ Phoenix	W 95–82	Clifford Robinson (28)	Ben Wallace (14)	Jerry Stackhouse (7)	America West Arena; 18,299	40–27
68	March 22	@ L.A. Lakers	L 82–94	Jerry Stackhouse (21)	Ben Wallace (11)	Jerry Stackhouse (6)	STAPLES Center; 18,997	40–28
69	March 24	Boston	W 109–101	Jerry Stackhouse (30)	Ben Wallace (28)	Jerry Stackhouse (8)	The Palace of Auburn Hills; 22,076	41–28
70	March 26	@ Indiana	W 96–77	Corliss Williamson (23)	Ben Wallace (14)	Jerry Stackhouse (6)	Conseco Fieldhouse; 16,127	42–28
71	March 27	New York	L 82–89	Stackhouse & Atkins (18)	Ben Wallace (20)	Chucky Atkins (4)	The Palace of Auburn Hills; 18,241	42–29
72	March 29	Golden State	W 110–103	Jerry Stackhouse (21)	Ben Wallace (21)	Jon Barry (5)	The Palace of Auburn Hills; 22,076	43–29
73	March 31	Denver	W 86–82	Jerry Stackhouse (22)	Ben Wallace (18)	Stackhouse & Barry (4)	The Palace of Auburn Hills; 16,658	44–29

April: 6–3 (home: 2–3; road: 4–0)

Game	Date	Team	Score	High points	High rebounds	High assists	Location Attendance	Record
74	April 2	@ Miami	W 90–87	Corliss Williamson (20)	Ben Wallace (16)	Jerry Stackhouse (4)	American Airlines Arena; 15,401	45–29
75	April 3	Sacramento	L 86–107	Corliss Williamson (13)	Ben Wallace (11)	Wallace & Jones (4)	The Palace of Auburn Hills; 22,076	45–30
76	April 5	@ Philadelphia	W 92–88	Jerry Stackhouse (34)	Ben Wallace (10)	Jerry Stackhouse (7)	First Union Center; 20,754	46–30
77	April 8	Atlanta	W 105–99	Chucky Atkins (20)	Željko Rebrača (13)	Jerry Stackhouse (12)	The Palace of Auburn Hills; 17,147	47–30
78	April 10	Chicago	L 101–102	Clifford Robinson (27)	Jerry Stackhouse (9)	Jerry Stackhouse (8)	The Palace of Auburn Hills; 18,598	47–31
79	April 12	San Antonio	L 86–96	Chucky Atkins (18)	Corliss Williamson (10)	Stackhouse & Barry (6)	The Palace of Auburn Hills; 22,076	47–32
80	April 13	@ Chicago	W 124–106	Chucky Atkins (26)	Ben Wallace (14)	Stackhouse & Atkins (6)	United Center; 22,656	48–32
81	April 16	@ New Jersey	W 103–98	Chucky Atkins (21)	Ben Wallace (16)	Robinson & Barry (5)	Continental Airlines Arena; 15,084	49–32
82	April 17	Milwaukee	W 123–89	Clifford Robinson (24)	Ben Wallace (20)	Chucky Atkins (9)	The Palace of Auburn Hills; 19,473	50–32

2001–02 schedule

== Playoffs ==
2002 playoff game log
First Round: 3–2 (home: 3–0; road: 0–2)

Game	Date	Team	Score	High points	High rebounds	High assists	Location Attendance	Series
1	April 21	Toronto	W 85–63	Jerry Stackhouse (20)	Ben Wallace (20)	Jerry Stackhouse (4)	The Palace of Auburn Hills; 22,076	1–0
2	April 24	Toronto	W 96–91	Jerry Stackhouse (31)	Ben Wallace (15)	three players tied (4)	The Palace of Auburn Hills; 22,076	2–0
3	April 27	@ Toronto	L 84–94	Chucky Atkins (21)	Ben Wallace (11)	Jerry Stackhouse (4)	Air Canada Centre; 20,138	2–1
4	April 29	@ Toronto	L 83–89	Chucky Atkins (20)	Ben Wallace (12)	Clifford Robinson (6)	Air Canada Centre; 20,112	2–2
5	May 2	Toronto	W 85–82	Corliss Williamson (23)	Ben Wallace (17)	Jerry Stackhouse (7)	The Palace of Auburn Hills; 22,076	3–2

Conference semifinals: 1–4 (home: 1–2; road: 0–2)

Game	Date	Team	Score	High points	High rebounds	High assists	Location Attendance	Series
1	May 5	Boston	W 96–84	Clifford Robinson (30)	Ben Wallace (12)	Atkins, Stackhouse (8)	The Palace of Auburn Hills; 20,252	1–0
2	May 8	Boston	L 77–85	Jerry Stackhouse (25)	Ben Wallace (16)	Chucky Atkins (4)	The Palace of Auburn Hills; 22,076	1–1
3	May 10	@ Boston	L 64–66	Jerry Stackhouse (19)	Ben Wallace (21)	Clifford Robinson (5)	FleetCenter; 18,624	1–2
4	May 12	@ Boston	L 79–90	Clifford Robinson (24)	Ben Wallace (21)	Damon Jones (9)	FleetCenter; 18,624	1–3
5	May 14	Boston	L 81–90	Chucky Atkins (22)	Ben Wallace (16)	Robinson, Stackhouse (5)	The Palace of Auburn Hills; 22,076	1–4

2002 schedule

== Player statistics ==
Legend
GP	Games played	GS	Games started	MPG	Minutes per game
FG%	Field-goal percentage	3P%	3-point field-goal percentage	FT%	Free-throw percentage
RPG	Rebounds per game	APG	Assists per game	SPG	Steals per game
BPG	Blocks per game	PPG	Points per game

=== Season ===
Player	GP	GS	MPG	FG%	3P%	FT%	RPG	APG	SPG	BPG	PPG
Victor Alexander	15	0	6.5	.353	.000	.500	1.9	.4	.0	.1	2.7
Chucky Atkins	79	62	28.9	.466	.411	.692	2.0	3.3	.9	.1	12.1
Dana Barros	29	20	20.1	.385	.338	.778	2.0	2.7	.5	.1	6.7
Jon Barry	82	6	24.2	.489	.469	.931	2.9	3.3	1.1	.2	9.0
Brian Cardinal	8	0	5.4	.462	.429	1.000	.8	.3	.1	.0	2.1
Michael Curry	82	75	23.3	.453	.269	.791	2.0	1.5	.6	.1	4.0
Damon Jones	67	0	16.2	.401	.371	.729	1.5	2.1	.3	.0	5.1
Mikki Moore	30	0	7.2	.475	.500	.769	1.8	.4	.2	.3	2.6
Zeljko Rebraca	74	4	15.9	.505	.000	.771	3.9	.5	.4	1.0	6.9
Clifford Robinson	80	80	35.7	.425	.378	.694	4.8	2.5	1.1	1.2	14.6
Jerry Stackhouse	76	76	35.3	.397	.287	.858	4.1	5.3	1.0	.5	21.4
Ratko Varda	1	0	6.0	.667	.000	1.000	1.0	.0	.0	.0	5.0
Ben Wallace	80	80	36.5	.531	.000	.423	13.0	1.4	1.7	3.5	7.6
Rodney White	16	0	8.1	.350	.222	.857	1.1	.8	.6	.1	3.5
Corliss Williamson	78	7	21.8	.510	.200	.805	4.1	1.2	.6	.3	13.6

=== Playoffs ===
Player	GP	GS	MPG	FG%	3P%	FT%	RPG	APG	SPG	BPG	PPG
Victor Alexander	1	0	3.0	.000			1.0	.0	.0	.0	.0
Chucky Atkins	10	10	29.4	.364	.359	.765	2.4	3.4	.6	.1	11.3
Dana Barros	4	0	1.5	.333	.000		.0	.3	.0	.0	.5
Jon Barry	10	0	17.7	.475	.447	.625	2.0	2.1	.5	.1	8.0
Michael Curry	10	10	22.1	.564	.385	.727	1.4	1.2	.4	.0	5.7
Damon Jones	10	0	18.1	.381	.296	.750	2.1	2.5	.5	.0	4.3
Željko Rebrača	5	0	13.8	.455		.786	2.0	.0	.2	.2	4.2
Clifford Robinson	10	10	40.9	.363	.340	.800	3.0	2.9	1.8	1.9	13.2
Jerry Stackhouse	10	10	36.1	.321	.340	.825	4.3	4.3	.6	.6	17.6
Ben Wallace	10	10	40.8	.475		.436	16.1	1.2	1.9	2.6	7.3
Rodney White	1	0	2.0	.000			.0	.0	.0	.0	.0
Corliss Williamson	10	0	26.9	.464	.000	.763	5.3	1.0	.9	.2	13.3

Player statistics citation:

== Awards and records ==
- Ben Wallace, NBA Defensive Player of the Year Award
- Corliss Williamson, NBA Sixth Man of the Year Award
- Rick Carlisle, NBA Coach of the Year Award
- Ben Wallace, All-NBA Third Team
- Ben Wallace, NBA All-Defensive First Team
- Clifford Robinson, NBA All-Defensive Second Team
- Željko Rebrača, NBA All-Rookie Team 2nd Team

== See also ==
- 2001-02 NBA season
