= 2001–02 Charlotte Hornets season =

NBA professional basketball team season

- Head coach: Paul Silas
- General manager: Bob Bass
- Owner: George Shinn Ray Wooldridge
- Arena: Charlotte Coliseum

Results
- Record: 44–38 (.537)
- Place: Division: 2nd (Central); Conference: 4th (Eastern)
- Playoff finish: Conference semifinals (lost to Nets 1–4)
- Stats at Basketball Reference

Local media
- Television: WJZY
- Radio: WBT

The 2001–02 Charlotte Hornets season was the 14th, and final season for the original Charlotte Hornets in the National Basketball Association.

== Season summary ==
=== Off-season ===
During the off-season, the Hornets acquired George Lynch and Robert Traylor from the Philadelphia 76ers in a three-team trade, and signed free agents Stacey Augmon, Bryce Drew and three-point specialist Matt Bullard.

=== Regular season ===
The Hornets struggled playing around .500 in winning percentage in the first half of the regular season, holding a 23–25 record at the All-Star break. Jamal Mashburn only played just 40 games due to a lower abdominal strain, and was replaced with second-year forward Lee Nailon as the team's starting small forward. Despite losing Mashburn, the Hornets posted a seven-game winning streak in March, and finished in second place in the Central Division with a 44–38 record, earning the fourth seed in the Eastern Conference, and qualifying for their seventh NBA playoff appearance.

Mashburn averaged 21.5 points, 6.1 rebounds and 4.3 assists per game, while Baron Davis continued to show improvement, averaging 18.1 points, 8.5 assists and 2.1 steals per game, and leading the Hornets with 170 three-point field goals, and David Wesley provided the team with 14.2 points and 3.5 assists per game. In addition, Elden Campbell contributed 13.9 points, 6.9 rebounds and 1.8 blocks per game, while Nailon provided with 10.8 points per game, and P.J. Brown averaged 8.4 points and 9.8 rebounds per game. Off the bench, second-year center Jamaal Magloire averaged 8.5 points and 5.6 rebounds per game, while Augmon contributed 4.6 points per game, and Lynch provided with 3.8 points and 4.1 rebounds per game, but only played just 45 games due to injury.

During the NBA All-Star weekend at the First Union Center in Philadelphia, Pennsylvania, Davis was selected for the 2002 NBA All-Star Game, as a member of the Eastern Conference All-Star team; it was his first ever All-Star appearance. Meanwhile, Nailon was selected for the NBA Rookie Challenge Game, as a member of the Sophomores team. Nailon also finished tied in 16th place in Most Improved Player voting.

The Hornets' home-game attendance continued to decrease as the team finished last in the NBA, with an attendance of 462,738 at the Charlotte Coliseum during the regular season, which was 29th in the league. The team also posted a better 23–18 road record than their 21–20 record at home. The Hornets' low attendance was a stark contrast to their earlier years in Charlotte, in which they led the league in home-game attendance eight times in the franchise's first nine seasons in the NBA (their 1988–89 inaugural season, and the 1990–91 to 1996–97 seasons).

=== NBA playoffs ===
In the Eastern Conference First Round of the 2002 NBA playoffs, the Hornets faced off against the 5th–seeded Orlando Magic, a team that featured All-Star guard Tracy McGrady, second-year star Mike Miller, and Darrell Armstrong. Despite both teams finishing with the same regular-season record, the Hornets had home-court advantage in the series. The Hornets won Game 1 over the Magic at home, 80–79 at the Charlotte Coliseum, despite losing Mashburn to injury for the remainder of the playoffs, but then lost Game 2 at home in overtime, 111–103 as the Magic evened the series. The Hornets managed to win the next two games on the road, which included a Game 4 win over the Magic at the TD Waterhouse Centre, 102–85 to win the series in four games.

In the Eastern Conference Semi-finals, the team faced off against the top–seeded, and Atlantic Division champion New Jersey Nets, who were led by the trio of All-Star guard Jason Kidd, second-year star Kenyon Martin, and Keith Van Horn. The Nets took a 2–0 series lead, but the Hornets managed to win Game 3 at the Charlotte Coliseum, 115–97. However, the Hornets lost the next two games, including a Game 5 road loss to the Nets at the Continental Airlines Arena, 103–95, thus losing the series in five games.

The Nets would advance to the NBA Finals for the first time in franchise history, but would lose to the 2-time defending NBA champion Los Angeles Lakers in a four-game sweep in the 2002 NBA Finals.

=== Aftermath ===
This was also the Hornets' final season in Charlotte, North Carolina, and their final season in which they played their home games at the Charlotte Coliseum; the team relocated to New Orleans, Louisiana, and became the New Orleans Hornets the following season. Other city candidates for the team's relocation included Louisville, Kentucky, Norfolk, Virginia, St. Louis, Missouri and Anaheim, California. Following the season, Nailon and Bullard were both released to free agency.

The city of Charlotte would return to the NBA two seasons later with the expansion Charlotte Bobcats, who began play in the 2004–05 season; that franchise changed its name to the "Hornets" in 2014 after the original franchise renamed itself the "Pelicans", and also reclaimed the original Hornets' history from 1988 to 2002. As a result, the Hornets are now reckoned as having suspended operations after this season before returning as the Bobcats in 2004, while the relocated franchise is retroactively deemed as a 2002 expansion team.

As of 2026, this was the final season in which the Charlotte Hornets have won an NBA playoff series.

== Offseason ==
=== NBA draft ===
Round	Pick	Player	Position	Nationality	College
1	16	Kirk Haston	PF	United States	Indiana

The 2001 NBA draft was the last appearance of the Charlotte Hornets in their first incarnation. Entering it, Charlotte held one first-round pick, as they had previously traded their second-round pick to the Chicago Bulls.

== Roster ==
2001–02 Charlotte Hornets roster
Players

Pos.	No.	Player	Height	Weight	DOB	From
G/F	2	Stacey Augmon	6 ft 8 in (2.03 m)	205 lb (93 kg)	1968–08–01	UNLV
F/C	42	P.J. Brown	6 ft 11 in (2.11 m)	225 lb (102 kg)	1969–10–14	Louisiana Tech
F	50	Matt Bullard	6 ft 10 in (2.08 m)	215 lb (98 kg)	1967–06–05	Iowa
F/C	5	Elden Campbell	6 ft 11 in (2.11 m)	215 lb (98 kg)	1968–07–23	Clemson
G	1	Baron Davis	6 ft 3 in (1.91 m)	209 lb (95 kg)	1979–04–13	UCLA
G	17	Bryce Drew	6 ft 2 in (1.88 m)	185 lb (84 kg)	1974–09–21	Valparaiso
F/C	35	Kirk Haston	6 ft 9 in (2.06 m)	242 lb (110 kg)	1979–03–10	Indiana
F	9	George Lynch	6 ft 8 in (2.03 m)	218 lb (99 kg)	1970–09–03	North Carolina
C	21	Jamaal Magloire	6 ft 11 in (2.11 m)	259 lb (117 kg)	1978–05–21	Kentucky
F	24	Jamal Mashburn	6 ft 8 in (2.03 m)	240 lb (109 kg)	1972–11–29	Kentucky
C	6	Jérôme Moïso	6 ft 10 in (2.08 m)	235 lb (107 kg)	1978–06–15	UCLA
F	54	Lee Nailon	6 ft 9 in (2.06 m)	238 lb (108 kg)	1975–02–22	TCU
F	34	Robert Traylor	6 ft 8 in (2.03 m)	284 lb (129 kg)	1977–02–01	Michigan
G	4	David Wesley	6 ft 0 in (1.83 m)	190 lb (86 kg)	1970–11–14	Baylor

Coaches
Head coach
- Paul Silas
Assistant(s)
- Jeff Bower
- Bob Donewald Jr.
- Brian Hill
- Stephen Silas
- Terry Kofler (trainer)

Legend
- (DP) Unsigned draft pick
- (FA) Free agent
- (S) Suspended
- Injured

Roster
Updated: November 19, 2001

== Regular season ==
=== Season standings ===
Central Division	W	L	PCT	GB	Home	Road	Div
y-Detroit Pistons	50	32	.610	–	26–15	24–17	20–8
x-Charlotte Hornets	44	38	.537	6	21–20	23–18	17–11
x-Toronto Raptors	42	40	.512	8	24–17	18–23	17–11
x-Indiana Pacers	42	40	.512	8	25–16	17–24	13–15
e-Milwaukee Bucks	41	41	.500	9	25–16	16–25	17–11
e-Atlanta Hawks	33	49	.402	17	23–18	10–31	11–17
e-Cleveland Cavaliers	29	53	.354	21	20–21	9–32	12–16
e-Chicago Bulls	21	61	.256	29	14–27	7–34	5–23

#	Eastern Conference				
#	Team	W	L	PCT	GB
1	c-New Jersey Nets	52	30	.634	–
2	y-Detroit Pistons	50	32	.610	2
3	x-Boston Celtics	49	33	.598	3
4	x-Charlotte Hornets	44	38	.537	8
5	x-Orlando Magic	44	38	.537	8
6	x-Philadelphia 76ers	43	39	.524	9
7	x-Toronto Raptors	42	40	.512	10
8	x-Indiana Pacers	42	40	.512	10
9	e-Milwaukee Bucks	41	41	.500	11
10	e-Washington Wizards	37	45	.451	15
11	e-Miami Heat	36	46	.439	16
12	e-Atlanta Hawks	33	49	.402	19
13	e-New York Knicks	30	52	.366	22
14	e-Cleveland Cavaliers	29	53	.354	23
15	e-Chicago Bulls	21	61	.256	31

z – clinched division title
y – clinched division title
x – clinched playoff spot

== Playoffs ==
2002 playoff game log
Total: 4–5 (home: 2–2; road: 2–3)
First Round: 3–1 (home: 1–1; road: 2–0)

Game	Date	Team	Score	High points	High rebounds	High assists	Location Attendance	Series
1	April 20	Orlando	W 80–79	Baron Davis (28)	P. J. Brown (15)	Baron Davis (7)	Charlotte Coliseum; 9,505	1–0
2	April 23	Orlando	L 103–111 (OT)	Elden Campbell (27)	Elden Campbell (13)	Baron Davis (10)	Charlotte Coliseum; 10,323	1–1
3	April 27	@ Orlando	W 110–100 (OT)	Baron Davis (33)	Baron Davis (14)	Baron Davis (10)	TD Waterhouse Centre; 16,754	2–1
4	April 30	@ Orlando	W 102–85	Baron Davis (28)	Baron Davis (11)	Baron Davis (10)	TD Waterhouse Centre; 16,254	3–1

Conference semifinals: 1–4 (home: 1–1; road: 0–3)

Game	Date	Team	Score	High points	High rebounds	High assists	Location Attendance	Series
1	May 5	@ New Jersey	L 93–99	Baron Davis (23)	P. J. Brown (9)	David Wesley (7)	Continental Airlines Arena; 19,071	0–1
2	May 7	@ New Jersey	L 88–102	Baron Davis (21)	George Lynch (11)	Baron Davis (7)	Continental Airlines Arena; 20,049	0–2
3	May 9	New Jersey	W 115–97	Baron Davis (26)	George Lynch (12)	Baron Davis (8)	Charlotte Coliseum; 11,363	1–2
4	May 12	New Jersey	L 79–89	Baron Davis (20)	P. J. Brown (16)	Baron Davis (6)	Charlotte Coliseum; 13,864	1–3
5	May 15	@ New Jersey	L 95–103	Magloire, Nailon (14)	George Lynch (13)	Baron Davis (8)	Continental Airlines Arena; 20,049	1–4

2002 schedule

== Player statistics ==
=== Ragular season ===
Player	POS	GP	GS	MP	REB	AST	STL	BLK	PTS	MPG	RPG	APG	SPG	BPG	PPG
Baron Davis	PG	82	82	3,318	349	698	172	47	1,484	40.5	4.3	8.5	2.1	.6	18.1
Jamaal Magloire	C	82	8	1,549	461	31	27	86	699	18.9	5.6	.4	.3	1.0	8.5
P. J. Brown	C	80	80	2,563	786	107	59	78	669	32.0	9.8	1.3	.7	1.0	8.4
Lee Nailon	SF	79	41	1,912	291	94	59	17	851	24.2	3.7	1.2	.7	.2	10.8
Elden Campbell	PF	77	74	2,156	530	102	60	137	1,074	28.0	6.9	1.3	.8	1.8	13.9
Stacey Augmon	SG	77	3	1,319	225	103	56	12	357	17.1	2.9	1.3	.7	.2	4.6
David Wesley	SG	67	63	2,487	143	236	74	15	951	37.1	2.1	3.5	1.1	.2	14.2
Robert Traylor	PF	61	1	678	187	37	24	37	228	11.1	3.1	.6	.4	.6	3.7
Bryce Drew	PG	61	0	774	72	101	32	2	210	12.7	1.2	1.7	.5	.0	3.4
George Lynch	SF	45	18	893	186	54	40	14	172	19.8	4.1	1.2	.9	.3	3.8
Jamal Mashburn	SF	40	40	1,601	242	171	45	6	858	40.0	6.1	4.3	1.1	.2	21.5
Matt Bullard	PF	31	0	350	47	16	2	2	105	11.3	1.5	.5	.1	.1	3.4
Kirk Haston	PF	15	0	77	20	5	0	1	26	5.1	1.3	.3	.0	.1	1.7
Jérôme Moïso	C	15	0	76	25	4	3	2	16	5.1	1.7	.3	.2	.1	1.1
Eldridge Recasner^{†}	SG	1	0	2	0	0	0	0	0	2.0	.0	.0	.0	.0	.0

- ^{†} Denotes player spent time with another team in the season. Stats reflect time with the Hornets only.

=== Playoffs ===
Player	POS	GP	GS	MP	REB	AST	STL	BLK	PTS	MPG	RPG	APG	SPG	BPG	PPG
Baron Davis	PG	9	9	401	63	71	32	5	203	44.6	7.0	7.9	3.6	.6	22.6
David Wesley	SG	9	9	377	17	31	10	2	142	41.9	1.9	3.4	1.1	.2	15.8
P. J. Brown	C	9	9	331	86	14	6	12	92	36.8	9.6	1.6	.7	1.3	10.2
Elden Campbell	PF	9	9	254	60	16	6	23	122	28.2	6.7	1.8	.7	2.6	13.6
George Lynch	SF	9	7	286	76	14	10	6	69	31.8	8.4	1.6	1.1	.7	7.7
Lee Nailon	SF	9	1	160	24	6	3	0	69	17.8	2.7	.7	.3	.0	7.7
Stacey Augmon	SG	9	0	152	27	13	10	1	48	16.9	3.0	1.4	1.1	.1	5.3
Jamaal Magloire	C	8	0	168	45	5	0	15	98	21.0	5.6	.6	.0	1.9	12.3
Robert Traylor	PF	8	0	62	16	3	2	2	18	7.8	2.0	.4	.3	.3	2.3
Bryce Drew	PG	2	0	5	0	2	0	0	2	2.5	.0	1.0	.0	.0	1.0
Kirk Haston	PF	2	0	4	1	0	1	0	2	2.0	.5	.0	.5	.0	1.0
Jamal Mashburn	SF	1	1	10	1	1	0	0	0	10.0	1.0	1.0	.0	.0	.0

== Transactions ==
- June 14, 2001

Traded a 2001 2nd round draft pick (Sean Lampley was later selected) to the Chicago Bulls for Roberto Dueñas.

- July 24, 2001

Signed Bryce Drew as a free agent.

- July 25, 2001

Signed Stacey Augmon as a free agent.

- August 13, 2001

Signed Matt Bullard as a free agent.

- October 25, 2001

As part of a 3-team trade, the Charlotte Hornets traded Derrick Coleman to the Philadelphia 76ers; the Charlotte Hornets traded cash to the Golden State Warriors; the Golden State Warriors traded Chris Porter to the Charlotte Hornets; the Golden State Warriors traded Corie Blount and Vonteego Cummings to the Philadelphia 76ers; the Philadelphia 76ers traded George Lynch, Jérôme Moïso and Robert Traylor to the Charlotte Hornets; and the Philadelphia 76ers traded Cedric Henderson and a 2005 1st round draft pick (Joey Graham was later selected) to the Golden State Warriors.

- October 26, 2001

Waived Chris Porter.

- October 29, 2001

Waived Tim James.

- November 19, 2001

Waived Eldridge Recasner.

Player Transactions Citation:
