= 2001–02 Los Angeles Clippers season =

NBA professional basketball team season

- Head coach: Alvin Gentry
- Owners: Donald Sterling
- Arena: Staples Center

Results
- Record: 39–43 (.476)
- Place: Division: 5th (Pacific); Conference: 9th (Western)
- Playoff finish: Did not qualify
- Stats at Basketball Reference

Local media
- Television: Fox Sports Net West 2
- Radio: KSPN

The 2001–02 Los Angeles Clippers season was the 32nd season for the Los Angeles Clippers in the National Basketball Association, and their 18th season in Los Angeles, California.

== Season summary ==
=== Off-season ===
The Clippers received the second overall pick in the 2001 NBA draft, and selected center and high school basketball star Tyson Chandler; however, the team soon traded Chandler to the Chicago Bulls in exchange for Elton Brand on draft day.

=== Regular season ===
With the addition of Brand, the Clippers played their best basketball with a 15–11 start as of December 22, 2001. The team began to fall under .500 in winning percentage, but still played competitive basketball through most of the first half of the regular season, holding a 25–26 record at the All-Star break. However, the team dealt with injuries, as Lamar Odom only played just 29 games due to a wrist injury, and second-year guard Keyon Dooling only appeared in just 14 games due to an ankle injury. After holding a 36–33 record in mid-March, the Clippers struggled and lost 10 of their final 13 games of the season, finishing in fifth place in the Pacific Division with a 39–43 record, which was ninth place in the Western Conference; the team failed to qualify for the NBA playoffs for the fifth consecutive year, and finished five games behind the 8th–seeded Utah Jazz.

Brand averaged 18.2 points, 11.6 rebounds and 2.0 blocks per game, while Jeff McInnis provided the team with 14.6 points and 6.2 assists per game, and second-year guard Quentin Richardson played an increased role as the team's sixth man off the bench, averaging 13.3 points per game, and leading the Clippers with 133 three-point field goals. In addition, Corey Maggette contributed 11.4 points per game, while Odom averaged 13.1 points, 6.1 rebounds and 5.9 assists per game, Michael Olowokandi provided with 11.1 points, 8.9 rebounds and 1.8 blocks per game, second-year forward Darius Miles averaged 9.5 points, 5.5 rebounds and 1.3 blocks per game, and three-point specialist Eric Piatkowski contributed 8.8 points per game and 111 three-point field goals.

During the NBA All-Star weekend at the First Union Center in Philadelphia, Pennsylvania, Brand was selected for the 2002 NBA All-Star Game, as a member of the Western Conference All-Star team; it was his first ever All-Star appearance. Meanwhile, Richardson participated in the NBA Three-Point Shootout, and was also selected along with Miles for the NBA Rookie Challenge Game, as members of the Sophomores team. Brand also finished tied in 16th place in Most Valuable Player voting, while Richardson finished in third place in Sixth Man of the Year voting; Olowokandi finished tied in seventh place in Most Improved Player voting, and head coach Alvin Gentry finished tied in seventh place in Coach of the Year voting.

The Clippers finished 13th in the NBA in home-game attendance, with an attendance of 740,185 at the Staples Center during the regular season.

=== Aftermath ===
Following the season, Miles was traded to the Cleveland Cavaliers, and McInnis signed as a free agent with the Portland Trail Blazers.

== Draft picks ==
Round	Pick	Player	Position	Nationality	College / Club Team
1	2	Tyson Chandler (traded to Chicago)	PF/C	United States	

== Roster ==
2001–02 Los Angeles Clippers roster
Players

Pos.	No.	Player	Height	Weight	DOB	From
G	11	Earl Boykins	5 ft 5 in (1.65 m)	220 lb (100 kg)	1976–06–02	Eastern Michigan
F/C	42	Elton Brand	6 ft 8 in (2.03 m)	272 lb (123 kg)	1979–03–11	Duke
G	1	Keyon Dooling	6 ft 3 in (1.91 m)	190 lb (86 kg)	1980–05–08	Missouri
F/C	54	Obinna Ekezie	6 ft 9 in (2.06 m)	270 lb (122 kg)	1975–08–22	Maryland
F	32	Tremaine Fowlkes	6 ft 8 in (2.03 m)	220 lb (100 kg)	1976–04–11	Fresno State
F	40	Harold Jamison	6 ft 9 in (2.06 m)	269 lb (122 kg)	1976–11–20	Clemson
G/F	50	Corey Maggette	6 ft 6 in (1.98 m)	225 lb (102 kg)	1979–11–12	Duke
G	5	Jeff McInnis	6 ft 4 in (1.93 m)	179 lb (81 kg)	1974–10–22	North Carolina
F	21	Darius Miles	6 ft 9 in (2.06 m)	210 lb (95 kg)	1981–10–09	East St. Louis HS (IL)
F	7	Lamar Odom	6 ft 10 in (2.08 m)	221 lb (100 kg)	1979–11–06	Rhode Island
C	34	Michael Olowokandi	7 ft 0 in (2.13 m)	270 lb (122 kg)	1975–04–03	Pacific
G	24	Doug Overton	6 ft 3 in (1.91 m)	190 lb (86 kg)	1969–08–03	La Salle
G/F	52	Eric Piatkowski	6 ft 7 in (2.01 m)	215 lb (98 kg)	1970–09–30	Nebraska
G	14	Eldridge Recasner	6 ft 3 in (1.91 m)	193 lb (88 kg)	1967–12–14	Washington
G/F	3	Quentin Richardson	6 ft 5 in (1.96 m)	238 lb (108 kg)	1980–04–13	DePaul
C	45	Sean Rooks	6 ft 10 in (2.08 m)	260 lb (118 kg)	1969–09–09	Arizona

Coaches
Head coach
- Alvin Gentry
Assistant(s)
- Dennis Johnson
- Rex Kalamian
- Igor Kokoskov
- Morris McHone

Legend
- (DP) Unsigned draft pick
- (FA) Free agent
- (S) Suspended
- Injured

Roster
Updated: 2002-03-16

=== Roster Notes ===
- The Clippers received shooting guard Vinny Del Negro from the Phoenix Suns in a trade early in the season, but he did not play for the team as he was quickly waived. He did come back and became the team's head coach from 2010 to 2013.

== Regular season ==
=== Season standings ===
Pacific Division	W	L	PCT	GB	Home	Road	Div
y-Sacramento Kings	61	21	.744	–	36–5	25–16	15–9
x-Los Angeles Lakers	58	24	.707	3	34–7	24–17	16–8
x-Portland Trail Blazers	49	33	.598	12	30–11	19–22	14–10
x-Seattle SuperSonics	45	37	.549	16	26–15	19–22	13–11
e-Los Angeles Clippers	39	43	.476	22	25–16	14–27	9–15
e-Phoenix Suns	36	46	.439	25	23–18	13–28	12–12
e-Golden State Warriors	21	61	.256	40	14–27	7–34	5–19

#	Western Conference				
#	Team	W	L	PCT	GB
1	z-Sacramento Kings	61	21	.744	–
2	y-San Antonio Spurs	58	24	.707	3
3	x-Los Angeles Lakers	58	24	.707	3
4	x-Dallas Mavericks	57	25	.695	4
5	x-Minnesota Timberwolves	50	32	.610	11
6	x-Portland Trail Blazers	49	33	.598	12
7	x-Seattle SuperSonics	45	37	.549	16
8	x-Utah Jazz	44	38	.537	17
9	e-Los Angeles Clippers	39	43	.476	22
10	e-Phoenix Suns	36	46	.439	25
11	e-Houston Rockets	28	54	.341	33
12	e-Denver Nuggets	27	55	.329	34
13	e-Memphis Grizzlies	23	59	.280	38
14	e-Golden State Warriors	21	61	.256	40

== Player statistics ==
Legend
GP	Games played	GS	Games started	MPG	Minutes per game
FG%	Field-goal percentage	3P%	3-point field-goal percentage	FT%	Free-throw percentage
RPG	Rebounds per game	APG	Assists per game	SPG	Steals per game
BPG	Blocks per game	PPG	Points per game

Player	GP	GS	MPG	FG%	3P%	FT%	RPG	APG	SPG	BPG	PPG
Elton Brand	80	80	37.8	52.7	0.0	74.2	11.6	2.4	1.0	2.0	18.2
Jeff McInnis	81	80	37.4	41.3	32.1	83.6	2.6	6.2	0.8	0.1	14.6
Quentin Richardson	81	0	26.6	43.2	38.1	76.5	4.1	1.6	1.0	0.3	13.3
Lamar Odom	29	25	34.4	41.9	19.0	65.6	6.1	5.9	0.8	1.2	13.1
Corey Maggette	63	52	25.6	44.3	33.1	80.1	3.7	1.8	0.7	0.3	11.4
Michael Olowokandi	80	79	32.1	43.3	0.0	62.2	8.9	1.1	0.7	1.8	11.1
Darius Miles	82	6	27.2	48.1	15.8	62.0	5.5	2.2	0.9	1.3	9.5
Eric Piatkowski	71	64	24.2	43.9	46.6	89.4	2.6	1.6	0.6	0.2	8.8
Earl Boykins	68	2	11.2	40.0	31.0	77.0	0.8	2.1	0.3	0.0	4.1
Keyon Dooling	14	0	11.1	38.6	28.6	83.3	0.2	0.9	0.3	0.2	4.1
Tremaine Fowlkes	22	17	15.6	39.1	0.0	77.4	2.9	0.8	0.5	0.0	3.4
Sean Rooks	61	2	11.9	41.8	0.0	72.4	2.0	0.4	0.2	0.3	3.0
Doug Overton	18	0	7.2	31.8	25.9	57.1	0.7	0.7	0.2	0.1	2.2
Harold Jamison	25	2	7.0	51.2	0.0	66.7	1.6	0.2	0.2	0.0	2.2
Obinna Ekezie	29	1	5.2	33.3	0.0	70.0	1.2	0.1	0.1	0.2	1.9
Eldridge Recasner	5	0	6.2	33.3	0.0	100.0	0.0	1.0	0.2	0.0	1.0

Player statistics citation:

== Awards, records and milestones ==
=== All-Star ===
Elton Brand selected as a reserve forward for the Western Conference All-Stars. Brand was chosen as a replacement for the injured Shaquille O'Neal on the roster. He is the first Clipper All-Star since Danny Manning was selected in 1994.

== Transactions ==
The Clippers were involved in the following transactions during the 2001–02 season.

=== Trades ===
June 26, 2001
To Los Angeles Clippers

- Cash considerations
To Philadelphia 76ers

- 2001 2nd round draft pick
June 27, 2001
To Los Angeles Clippers

- Elton Brand
To Chicago Bulls

- Brian Skinner & draft rights to Tyson Chandler
October 29, 2001
To Los Angeles Clippers

- Will Perdue
To Portland Trail Blazers

- Draft rights to Doron Sheffer
November 16, 2001
To Los Angeles Clippers

- Vinny Del Negro and cash considerations from the Phoenix Suns as part of a three-team trade with the Orlando Magic
To Orlando Magic

- 2005 second-round draft pick

=== Free agents ===
==== Additions ====
Player	Signed	Former team
Harold Jamison	September 28	Miami Heat
Obinna Ekezie	September 28	Dallas Mavericks
Eldridge Recasner	December 20 waived January 7 re-signed January 10	Charlotte Hornets
Tremaine Fowlkes	February 23	Columbus Riverdragons (NBDL)
Doug Overton	March 16	New Jersey Nets

==== Subtractions ====
Player	Left	New team
Keith Closs	waived, May 4	Pennsylvania ValleyDawgs (USBL)
Cherokee Parks	free agency, August 3	San Antonio Spurs
Zendon Hamilton	free agency, September 29	Denver Nuggets
Will Perdue	waived, October 29	Basketball commentator & analyst for ESPN
Derek Strong	waived, October 29	Columbus Riverdragons (NBDL)
Vinny Del Negro	waived, November 16	Phoenix Suns (radio commentator)
Eldridge Recasner	contract expired, January 29	Charlotte Hornets

Player Transactions Citation:
