= 2001–02 Portland Trail Blazers season =

NBA professional basketball team season

- Head coach: Maurice Cheeks
- General manager: Bob Whitsitt
- Owner: Paul Allen
- Arena: Rose Garden Arena

Results
- Record: 49–33 (.598)
- Place: Division: 3rd (Pacific); Conference: 6th (Western)
- Playoff finish: First round (lost to Lakers 0–3)
- Stats at Basketball Reference

Local media
- Television: KGW; ASCN
- Radio: KEX

The 2001–02 Portland Trail Blazers season was the 32nd season for the Portland Trail Blazers in the National Basketball Association.

== Season summary ==
=== Off-season ===
During the off-season, head coach Mike Dunleavy was fired after four years and two trips to the Western Conference Finals, and was replaced with Maurice Cheeks. The Trail Blazers acquired Derek Anderson and Steve Kerr from the San Antonio Spurs, signed free agent Ruben Patterson, and re-signed former Trail Blazers center Chris Dudley; Kerr would reunite with his former teammate of the Chicago Bulls, former All-Star forward Scottie Pippen, where they won three NBA championships in the late 1990s.

=== Regular season ===
Under Cheeks, and with the addition of Anderson and Patterson, the Trail Blazers struggled with a 13–18 start to the regular season, which included a six-game losing streak between December and January, but managed to hold a 25–23 record at the All-Star break. The Trail Blazers posted a 12-game winning streak between February and March, and finished in third place in the Pacific Division with a 49–33 record, earning the sixth seed in the Western Conference; the team qualified for the NBA playoffs for the 20th consecutive year, and also for the 25th time in 26 years.

Rasheed Wallace averaged 19.3 points, 8.2 rebounds and 1.3 blocks per game, and led the Trail Blazers with 114 three-point field goals, while Bonzi Wells averaged 17.0 points, 6.0 rebounds and 1.5 steals per game, and Damon Stoudamire provided the team with 13.5 points and 6.5 assists per game, along with 104 three-point field goals. In addition, Patterson contributed 11.2 points per game, while Anderson contributed 10.8 points per game, Pippen provided with 10.6 points, 5.9 assists and 1.6 steals per game, and Dale Davis averaged 9.5 points and 8.8 rebounds per game. Meanwhile, Shawn Kemp averaged 6.1 points and 3.8 rebounds per game, and Kerr contributed 4.1 points per game.

The Trail Blazers finished seventh in the NBA in home-game attendance, with an attendance of 797,821 at the Rose Garden Arena during the regular season.

=== NBA playoffs ===
In the Western Conference First Round of the 2002 NBA playoffs, and for the third consecutive year, the Trail Blazers faced off against the 3rd–seeded, and 2-time defending NBA champion Los Angeles Lakers, who were led by All-Star center Shaquille O'Neal, All-Star guard Kobe Bryant, and Derek Fisher. The result was identical to the previous year's playoffs; the Trail Blazers lost the first two games to the Lakers on the road at the Staples Center, before losing Game 3 at home, 92–91 at the Rose Garden Arena, thus losing the series in a three-game sweep. It was the fifth time in the last six seasons that the Trail Blazers' postseason run was ended by the Lakers.

The Lakers would go on to defeat the New Jersey Nets in a four-game sweep in the 2002 NBA Finals, winning their third consecutive NBA championship.

=== Aftermath ===
Following the season, Kemp signed as a free agent with the Orlando Magic, and Kerr was traded back to his former team, the San Antonio Spurs.

== Draft picks ==
Round	Pick	Player	Position	Nationality	School/Club team
1	19	Zach Randolph	PF	United States	Michigan State
2	49	Ruben Boumtje-Boumtje	C	Cameroon	Georgetown

== Roster ==
2001–02 Portland Trail Blazers roster
Players

Pos.	No.	Player	Height	Weight	DOB	From
G/F	1	Derek Anderson	6 ft 5 in (1.96 m)	194 lb (88 kg)	1974–07–18	Kentucky
G	12	Erick Barkley	6 ft 1 in (1.85 m)	177 lb (80 kg)	1978–02–21	St. John's
C	44	Ruben Boumtje-Boumtje	7 ft 0 in (2.13 m)	257 lb (117 kg)	1978–05–20	Georgetown
G	9	Rick Brunson	6 ft 4 in (1.93 m)	190 lb (86 kg)	1972–06–14	Temple
G	23	Mitchell Butler	6 ft 5 in (1.96 m)	210 lb (95 kg)	1970–12–15	UCLA
F/C	34	Dale Davis	6 ft 11 in (2.11 m)	230 lb (104 kg)	1969–03–25	Clemson
C	14	Chris Dudley	6 ft 11 in (2.11 m)	235 lb (107 kg)	1965–02–22	Yale
F/C	40	Shawn Kemp	6 ft 10 in (2.08 m)	230 lb (104 kg)	1969–11–26	Trinity Valley CC
G	25	Steve Kerr	6 ft 3 in (1.91 m)	175 lb (79 kg)	1965–09–27	Arizona
G/F	21	Ruben Patterson	6 ft 5 in (1.96 m)	224 lb (102 kg)	1975–07–31	Cincinnati
F	33	Scottie Pippen	6 ft 8 in (2.03 m)	210 lb (95 kg)	1965–09–25	Central Arkansas
F	50	Zach Randolph	6 ft 9 in (2.06 m)	260 lb (118 kg)	1981–07–16	Michigan State
G	3	Damon Stoudamire	5 ft 10 in (1.78 m)	171 lb (78 kg)	1973–09–03	Arizona
F/C	30	Rasheed Wallace	6 ft 10 in (2.08 m)	225 lb (102 kg)	1974–09–17	North Carolina
G/F	6	Bonzi Wells	6 ft 5 in (1.96 m)	210 lb (95 kg)	1976–09–28	Ball State

Coaches
Head coach
- Maurice Cheeks
Assistant(s)
- Tim Grgurich
- Jim Lynam
- Neal Meyer
- Dan Panaggio

Legend
- (DP) Unsigned draft pick
- (FA) Free agent
- (S) Suspended
- Injured

Roster

== Regular season ==
=== Season standings ===
Pacific Division	W	L	PCT	GB	Home	Road	Div
y-Sacramento Kings	61	21	.744	–	36–5	25–16	15–9
x-Los Angeles Lakers	58	24	.707	3	34–7	24–17	16–8
x-Portland Trail Blazers	49	33	.598	12	30–11	19–22	14–10
x-Seattle SuperSonics	45	37	.549	16	26–15	19–22	13–11
e-Los Angeles Clippers	39	43	.476	22	25–16	14–27	9–15
e-Phoenix Suns	36	46	.439	25	23–18	13–28	12–12
e-Golden State Warriors	21	61	.256	40	14–27	7–34	5–19

#	Western Conference				
#	Team	W	L	PCT	GB
1	z-Sacramento Kings	61	21	.744	–
2	y-San Antonio Spurs	58	24	.707	3
3	x-Los Angeles Lakers	58	24	.707	3
4	x-Dallas Mavericks	57	25	.695	4
5	x-Minnesota Timberwolves	50	32	.610	11
6	x-Portland Trail Blazers	49	33	.598	12
7	x-Seattle SuperSonics	45	37	.549	16
8	x-Utah Jazz	44	38	.537	17
9	e-Los Angeles Clippers	39	43	.476	22
10	e-Phoenix Suns	36	46	.439	25
11	e-Houston Rockets	28	54	.341	33
12	e-Denver Nuggets	27	55	.329	34
13	e-Memphis Grizzlies	23	59	.280	38
14	e-Golden State Warriors	21	61	.256	40

z - clinched division title
y - clinched division title
x - clinched playoff spot

== Playoffs ==
2002 playoff game log
First round: 0–3 (home: 0–1; road: 0–2)

Game	Date	Team	Score	High points	High rebounds	High assists	Location Attendance	Series
1	April 21	@ L.A. Lakers	L 87–95	Rasheed Wallace (25)	Rasheed Wallace (14)	Bonzi Wells (6)	Staples Center; 18,997	0–1
2	April 25	@ L.A. Lakers	L 96–103	Rasheed Wallace (31)	Rasheed Wallace (11)	Damon Stoudamire (5)	Staples Center; 18,997	0–2
3	April 28	L.A. Lakers	L 91–92	Rasheed Wallace (20)	Rasheed Wallace (12)	Scottie Pippen (8)	Rose Garden; 20,580	0–3

2002 schedule

== Player statistics ==
Legend
GP	Games played	GS	Games started	MPG	Minutes per game
FG%	Field-goal percentage	3P%	3-point field-goal percentage	FT%	Free-throw percentage
RPG	Rebounds per game	APG	Assists per game	SPG	Steals per game
BPG	Blocks per game	PPG	Points per game

=== Regular season ===
Player	GP	GS	MPG	FG%	3P%	FT%	RPG	APG	SPG	BPG	PPG
Rasheed Wallace	79	79	37.5	.469	.360	.734	8.2	1.9	1.3	1.3	19.3
Dale Davis	78	77	31.4	.510		.708	8.8	1.2	.8	1.1	9.5
Damon Stoudamire	75	71	37.3	.402	.353	.888	3.9	6.5	.9	.1	13.5
Ruben Patterson	75	13	23.5	.515	.250	.701	4.0	1.4	1.1	.5	11.2
Shawn Kemp	75	5	16.4	.430	.000	.794	3.8	.7	.6	.4	6.1
Bonzi Wells	74	69	31.7	.469	.384	.741	6.0	2.8	1.5	.3	17.0
Derek Anderson	70	27	26.6	.404	.373	.856	2.7	3.1	1.0	.1	10.8
Steve Kerr	65	0	11.9	.470	.394	.975	.9	1.0	.2	.0	4.1
Scottie Pippen	62	60	32.2	.411	.305	.774	5.2	5.9	1.6	.6	10.6
Rick Brunson	59	2	8.8	.398	.545	.707	1.2	1.9	.4	.0	2.1
Chris Dudley	43	2	7.6	.400	.000	.533	1.9	.3	.1	.3	1.1
Zach Randolph	41	0	5.8	.449		.667	1.7	.3	.2	.1	2.8
Ruben Boumtje-Boumtje	33	1	7.4	.406		.520	1.7	.1	.1	.5	1.2
Erick Barkley	19	4	12.0	.353	.143	.900	.9	1.8	.9	.1	3.1
Mitchell Butler	11	0	8.2	.435	.333	.667	1.3	.5	.0	.1	2.6

=== Playoffs ===
Player	GP	GS	MPG	FG%	3P%	FT%	RPG	APG	SPG	BPG	PPG
Rasheed Wallace	3	3	41.7	.406	.412	.813	12.3	1.7	.7	.7	25.3
Bonzi Wells	3	3	35.3	.368	.000	.692	4.0	4.3	2.0	.3	12.3
Scottie Pippen	3	3	33.0	.462	.545	.875	9.3	5.7	1.3	.7	16.3
Damon Stoudamire	3	3	33.0	.227	.750	.667	2.3	3.3	.7	.0	5.0
Dale Davis	3	3	23.3	.273		.500	6.7	1.3	1.3	1.0	2.3
Derek Anderson	3	0	25.3	.433	.333	.889	2.3	2.3	.7	.0	14.7
Ruben Patterson	3	0	21.7	.333	.000	.750	2.3	.3	1.0	.3	5.3
Steve Kerr	3	0	13.0	.429	.250	1.000	1.3	1.7	.3	.0	6.3
Shawn Kemp	3	0	11.7	.286		.700	2.7	.0	.3	.0	3.7
Chris Dudley	2	0	1.5	.000			1.0	.0	.0	.0	.0
Rick Brunson	2	0	1.0				.0	.0	.0	.0	.0
Zach Randolph	1	0	1.0				.0	.0	.0	.0	.0

- ^{†} Denotes player spent time with another team in the season. Stats reflect time with the Trail Blazers only.

Player statistics citation:
