= 2001–02 Minnesota Timberwolves season =

NBA professional basketball team season

- Head coach: Flip Saunders
- General manager: Kevin McHale
- Owners: Glen Taylor
- Arena: Target Center

Results
- Record: 50–32 (.610)
- Place: Division: 3rd (Midwest); Conference: 5th (Western)
- Playoff finish: First round (lost to Mavericks 0–3)
- Stats at Basketball Reference

Local media
- Television: KMSP-TV; WFTC; Fox Sports Net North
- Radio: KFAN

The 2001–02 Minnesota Timberwolves season was the 13th season for the Minnesota Timberwolves in the National Basketball Association.

== Season summary ==
=== Off-season ===
During the off-season, the Timberwolves were able to re-sign free agent Joe Smith; Smith previously played one season with the Detroit Pistons. In addition, the team also signed free agent Gary Trent.

=== Regular season ===
With the return of Smith along with the addition of Trent, the Timberwolves won nine of their first ten games of the regular season, which led them to a 28–9 start as of January 15, 2002, but started to slow down holding a 33–16 record at the All-Star break. Terrell Brandon suffered a knee injury after 32 games, and was out for the remainder of the season, as the team suffered a seven-game losing streak in March. At mid-season, the team traded Dean Garrett to the Golden State Warriors in exchange for second-year center Marc Jackson, and signed free agent Robert Pack in March. The Timberwolves finished in third place in the Midwest Division with a solid 50–32 record, and earned the fifth seed in the Western Conference; the team qualified for the NBA playoffs for the sixth consecutive year.

Kevin Garnett averaged 21.2 points, 12.1 rebounds, 5.2 assists and 1.6 blocks per game, and was named to the All-NBA Second Team, and to the NBA All-Defensive First Team. In addition, Wally Szczerbiak averaged 18.7 points and 4.8 rebounds per game, while Chauncey Billups provided the team with 12.5 points and 5.5 assists per game, and also led them with 124 three-point field goals, Brandon contributed 12.4 points, 8.3 assists and 1.6 steals per game, and Smith provided with 10.7 points and 6.3 rebounds per game. Meanwhile, Anthony Peeler contributed 9.0 points per game and 111 three-point field goals, Rasho Nesterovic averaged 8.4 points, 6.5 rebounds and 1.3 blocks per game, and Trent provided with 7.5 points and 4.2 rebounds per game.

During the NBA All-Star weekend at the First Union Center in Philadelphia, Pennsylvania, Garnett and Szczerbiak were both selected for the 2002 NBA All-Star Game, as members of the Western Conference All-Star team; it was Szczerbiak's first and only All-Star appearance. Garnett finished in twelfth place in Most Valuable Player voting, and also finished in second place in Defensive Player of the Year voting, behind Ben Wallace of the Detroit Pistons.

The Timberwolves finished 14th in the NBA in home-game attendance, with an attendance of 731,673 at the Target Center during the regular season.

=== NBA playoffs ===
In the Western Conference First Round of the 2002 NBA playoffs, the Timberwolves faced off against the 4th–seeded Dallas Mavericks, who were led by the All-Star trio of Dirk Nowitzki, Steve Nash and Michael Finley. The Timberwolves lost the first two games to the Mavericks on the road at the American Airlines Center, before losing Game 3 at home, 115–102 at the Target Center, thus losing the series in a three-game sweep. It was the sixth consecutive year that the Timberwolves lost in the opening round of the NBA playoffs.

=== Aftermath ===
Following the season, Billups signed as a free agent with the Detroit Pistons, while Pack was released to free agency, and veteran forward Sam Mitchell, who was the only member left from the team's inaugural season, retired.

== Draft picks ==
Round	Pick	Player	Position	Nationality	College
1	29	Forfeited pick			
2	45	Loren Woods	C	United States	Arizona

== Roster ==
2001–02 Minnesota Timberwolves roster
Players

Pos.	No.	Player	Height	Weight	DOB	From
G	5	Avery, William	6 ft 2 in (1.88 m)	197 lb (89 kg)	1979–08–08	Duke
G	4	Chauncey Billups	6 ft 3 in (1.91 m)	202 lb (92 kg)	1976–09–25	Colorado
G	7	Terrell Brandon	5 ft 11 in (1.80 m)	180 lb (82 kg)	1970–05–20	Oregon
G	1	Maurice Evans	6 ft 5 in (1.96 m)	220 lb (100 kg)	1978–11–08	Texas
F/C	21	Kevin Garnett	6 ft 11 in (2.11 m)	220 lb (100 kg)	1976–05–19	Farragut Academy (IL)
C	25	Marc Jackson	6 ft 10 in (2.08 m)	270 lb (122 kg)	1975–01–16	Temple
G	13	Felipe López	6 ft 5 in (1.96 m)	180 lb (82 kg)	1974–12–19	St. John's
F	42	Sam Mitchell	6 ft 6 in (1.98 m)	210 lb (95 kg)	1963–09–02	Mercer
C	8	Rasho Nesterović	7 ft 0 in (2.13 m)	255 lb (116 kg)	1976–05–30	Slovenia
G	14	Robert Pack	6 ft 2 in (1.88 m)	180 lb (82 kg)	1969–02–03	USC
G	44	Anthony Peeler	6 ft 4 in (1.93 m)	208 lb (94 kg)	1969–11–25	Missouri
C	32	Joe Smith	6 ft 10 in (2.08 m)	225 lb (102 kg)	1975–07–26	Maryland
G/F	10	Wally Szczerbiak	6 ft 7 in (2.01 m)	244 lb (111 kg)	1977–03–05	Miami (OH)
F	20	Gary Trent	6 ft 8 in (2.03 m)	250 lb (113 kg)	1974–09–22	Ohio
C	3	Loren Woods	7 ft 2 in (2.18 m)	260 lb (118 kg)	1978–06–21	Arizona

Coaches
Head coach
- Flip Saunders
Assistant(s)
- Greg Ballard
- Jerry Sichting
- Jimmy Williams
- Randy Wittman
- Don Zierden
- Gregg Farnam (trainer)

Legend
- (DP) Unsigned draft pick
- (FA) Free agent
- (S) Suspended
- Injured

Roster
Updated: March 18, 2002

== Regular season ==
=== Season standings ===
Midwest Division	W	L	PCT	GB	Home	Road	Div
y-San Antonio Spurs	58	24	.707	–	32–9	26–15	21–3
x-Dallas Mavericks	57	25	.695	1	30–11	27–14	16–8
x-Minnesota Timberwolves	50	32	.610	8	29–12	21–20	15–9
x-Utah Jazz	44	38	.537	14	25–16	19–22	8–16
e-Houston Rockets	28	54	.341	30	18–23	10–31	9–15
e-Denver Nuggets	27	55	.329	31	20–21	7–34	8–16
e-Memphis Grizzlies	23	59	.280	35	15–26	8–33	7–17

#	Western Conference				
#	Team	W	L	PCT	GB
1	z-Sacramento Kings	61	21	.744	–
2	y-San Antonio Spurs	58	24	.707	3
3	x-Los Angeles Lakers	58	24	.707	3
4	x-Dallas Mavericks	57	25	.695	4
5	x-Minnesota Timberwolves	50	32	.610	11
6	x-Portland Trail Blazers	49	33	.598	12
7	x-Seattle SuperSonics	45	37	.549	16
8	x-Utah Jazz	44	38	.537	17
9	e-Los Angeles Clippers	39	43	.476	22
10	e-Phoenix Suns	36	46	.439	25
11	e-Houston Rockets	28	54	.341	33
12	e-Denver Nuggets	27	55	.329	34
13	e-Memphis Grizzlies	23	59	.280	38
14	e-Golden State Warriors	21	61	.256	40

z - clinched division title
y - clinched division title
x - clinched playoff spot

== Playoffs ==
2002 playoff game log
First Round: 0–3 (home: 0–1; road: 0–2)

Game	Date	Team	Score	High points	High rebounds	High assists	Location Attendance	Series
1	April 21	@ Dallas	L 94–101	Chauncey Billups (25)	Kevin Garnett (21)	Chauncey Billups (9)	American Airlines Center; 20,010	0–1
2	April 24	@ Dallas	L 110–122	Kevin Garnett (31)	Kevin Garnett (18)	Billups, Garnett (4)	American Airlines Center; 20,084	0–2
3	April 28	Dallas	L 102–115	Kevin Garnett (22)	Kevin Garnett (17)	Kevin Garnett (5)	Target Center; 18,795	0–3

2002 schedule

== Player statistics ==
=== Regular season ===
Player	POS	GP	GS	MP	REB	AST	STL	BLK	PTS	MPG	RPG	APG	SPG	BPG	PPG
Wally Szczerbiak	SF	82	82	3,117	391	257	66	21	1,531	38.0	4.8	3.1	.8	.3	18.7
Rasho Nesterović	C	82	82	2,218	534	75	45	109	687	27.0	6.5	.9	.5	1.3	8.4
Chauncey Billups	PG	82	54	2,355	226	450	66	17	1,027	28.7	2.8	5.5	.8	.2	12.5
Anthony Peeler	SG	82	0	2,060	206	177	61	11	737	25.1	2.5	2.2	.7	.1	9.0
Kevin Garnett	PF	81	81	3,175	981	422	96	126	1,714	39.2	12.1	5.2	1.2	1.6	21.2
Sam Mitchell	SF	74	10	726	82	45	12	4	244	9.8	1.1	.6	.2	.1	3.3
Joe Smith	C	72	63	1,922	453	82	39	59	767	26.7	6.3	1.1	.5	.8	10.7
Felipe López	SG	67	0	581	80	39	18	1	169	8.7	1.2	.6	.3	.0	2.5
Gary Trent	PF	64	10	1,140	270	60	21	27	478	17.8	4.2	.9	.3	.4	7.5
Loren Woods	C	60	0	516	122	22	17	34	110	8.6	2.0	.4	.3	.6	1.8
Terrell Brandon	PG	32	28	962	93	264	52	6	397	30.1	2.9	8.3	1.6	.2	12.4
Dean Garrett^{†}	C	29	0	152	47	4	5	9	28	5.2	1.6	.1	.2	.3	1.0
William Avery	PG	28	0	258	24	36	7	0	71	9.2	.9	1.3	.3	.0	2.5
Marc Jackson^{†}	C	22	0	326	85	7	6	3	102	14.8	3.9	.3	.3	.1	4.6
Robert Pack	PG	16	0	252	23	49	13	0	62	15.8	1.4	3.1	.8	.0	3.9
Maurice Evans	SG	10	0	45	4	4	0	0	21	4.5	.4	.4	.0	.0	2.1

- ^{†} Denotes player spent time with another team in the season. Stats reflect time with the Timberwolves only.

=== Playoffs ===
Player	POS	GP	GS	MP	REB	AST	STL	BLK	PTS	MPG	RPG	APG	SPG	BPG	PPG
Chauncey Billups	PG	3	3	134	15	17	3	1	66	44.7	5.0	5.7	1.0	.3	22.0
Wally Szczerbiak	SF	3	3	131	21	6	2	0	60	43.7	7.0	2.0	.7	.0	20.0
Kevin Garnett	PF	3	3	130	56	15	5	5	72	43.3	18.7	5.0	1.7	1.7	24.0
Rasho Nesterović	C	3	3	92	20	3	1	0	34	30.7	6.7	1.0	.3	.0	11.3
Sam Mitchell	SF	3	2	34	2	3	1	1	8	11.3	.7	1.0	.3	.3	2.7
Joe Smith	C	3	1	43	11	0	0	1	13	14.3	3.7	.0	.0	.3	4.3
Anthony Peeler	SG	3	0	67	13	2	4	0	27	22.3	4.3	.7	1.3	.0	9.0
Gary Trent	PF	3	0	48	9	1	0	0	19	16.0	3.0	.3	.0	.0	6.3
Felipe López	SG	3	0	30	1	1	1	0	4	10.0	.3	.3	.3	.0	1.3
Robert Pack	PG	3	0	10	0	0	0	0	3	3.3	.0	.0	.0	.0	1.0
Marc Jackson	C	1	0	1	0	0	0	0	0	1.0	.0	.0	.0	.0	.0

== Awards and records ==
- Kevin Garnett, All-NBA Second Team
- Kevin Garnett, NBA All-Defensive First Team

== See also ==
- 2001-02 NBA season
