= 2001–02 Utah Jazz season =

NBA professional basketball team season

- Head coach: Jerry Sloan
- General manager: Kevin O'Connor
- Owner: Larry H. Miller
- Arena: Delta Center

Results
- Record: 44–38 (.537)
- Place: Division: 4th (Midwest); Conference: 8th (Western)
- Playoff finish: First round (lost to Kings 1–3)
- Stats at Basketball Reference

Local media
- Television: KJZZ-TV; Fox Sports Net Utah
- Radio: KFNZ

The 2001–02 Utah Jazz season was the 28th season for the Utah Jazz in the National Basketball Association, and their 23rd season in Salt Lake City, Utah.

== Season summary ==
=== Off-season ===
During the off-season, the Jazz signed free agent John Amaechi. Small forward and Russian basketball star Andrei Kirilenko, who was drafted by the Jazz as the 24th overall pick in the 1999 NBA draft, made his debut in the NBA this season.

=== Regular season ===
Despite the addition of Kirilenko, the Jazz began to show their age as the team struggled losing five of their first seven games, leading to a 6–11 start to the regular season. However, the team soon recovered and played above .500 in winning percentage for the remainder of the season, holding a 25–24 record at the All-Star break. The Jazz finished in fourth place in the Midwest Division with a 44–38 record, and earned the eighth seed in the Western Conference; the team qualified for the NBA playoffs for the 19th consecutive year. The Jazz also beat the Los Angeles Lakers' record of sixteen consecutive winning seasons above .500, set between the 1976–77 and 1991–92 seasons.

Karl Malone averaged 22.4 points, 8.6 rebounds, 4.3 assists and 1.9 steals per game, while Donyell Marshall averaged 14.8 points and 7.6 rebounds per game, and John Stockton provided the team with 13.4 points, 8.2 assists and 1.9 steals per game. In addition, Kirilenko provided with 10.7 points, 4.9 rebounds, 1.4 steals and 1.9 blocks per game, and was named to the NBA All-Rookie First Team, while Bryon Russell contributed 9.6 points and 4.5 rebounds per game, and John Crotty contributed 6.9 points and 3.4 assists per game. Meanwhile, Scott Padgett averaged 6.7 points and 3.8 rebounds per game, rookie center, and second-round draft pick Jarron Collins provided with 6.4 points and 4.2 rebounds per game, second-year guard DeShawn Stevenson contributed 4.9 points per game, and Greg Ostertag averaged 3.3 points, 4.2 rebounds and 1.5 blocks per game.

During the NBA All-Star weekend at the First Union Center in Philadelphia, Pennsylvania, Malone was selected for the 2002 NBA All-Star Game, as a member of the Western Conference All-Star team, but did not participate due to visiting his sick mother back home in Louisiana; it was his final All-Star selection. Meanwhile, Kirilenko was selected for the NBA Rookie Challenge Game, as a member of the Rookies team; he also finished tied in third place in Rookie of the Year voting.

The Jazz finished tenth in the NBA in home-game attendance, with an attendance of 766,108 at the Delta Center during the regular season.

=== NBA playoffs ===
In the Western Conference First Round of the 2002 NBA playoffs, the Jazz faced off against the top–seeded, and Pacific Division champion Sacramento Kings, who were led by the trio of All-Star forward Chris Webber, All-Star forward Peja Stojaković, and Mike Bibby. The Jazz lost Game 1 to the Kings on the road, 89–86 at the ARCO Arena II, but managed to win Game 2 on the road, 93–86 to even the series. However, the Jazz lost the next two games at home, which included a Game 4 loss to the Kings at the Delta Center, 91–86, thus losing the series in four games.

=== Notable highlights ===
Malone and Stockton both reached different milestones during the regular season; Malone scored his 34,000th career point, while Stockton reached 15,000 career assists and 3,000 career steals.

=== Aftermath ===
Following the season, Russell signed as a free agent with the Washington Wizards after nine seasons with the Jazz, while Marshall signed with the Chicago Bulls, and Crotty and John Starks both retired.

== Draft picks ==
Round	Pick	Player	Position	Nationality	College
1	24	Raúl López	PG	Spain	
2	52	Jarron Collins	C/PF	United States	Stanford

== Roster ==
2001–02 Utah Jazz roster
Players

Pos.	No.	Player	Height	Weight	DOB	From
F/C	13	John Amaechi	6 ft 10 in (2.08 m)	270 lb (122 kg)	1970–11–26	Penn State
C	31	Jarron Collins	6 ft 11 in (2.11 m)	230 lb (104 kg)	1978–12–02	Stanford
G	25	John Crotty (injured)	6 ft 1 in (1.85 m)	185 lb (84 kg)	1969–07–15	Virginia
F	47	Andrei Kirilenko	6 ft 9 in (2.06 m)	220 lb (100 kg)	1981–02–18	Russia
G	5	Rusty LaRue	6 ft 2 in (1.88 m)	210 lb (95 kg)	1973–12–10	Wake Forest
G/F	20	Quincy Lewis	6 ft 7 in (2.01 m)	215 lb (98 kg)	1977–06–26	Minnesota
F	32	Karl Malone	6 ft 9 in (2.06 m)	256 lb (116 kg)	1963–07–24	Louisiana Tech
F	42	Donyell Marshall	6 ft 9 in (2.06 m)	218 lb (99 kg)	1973–05–18	Connecticut
C	00	Greg Ostertag	7 ft 2 in (2.18 m)	280 lb (127 kg)	1973–03–06	Kansas
F	34	Scott Padgett	6 ft 9 in (2.06 m)	240 lb (109 kg)	1976–04–19	Kentucky
F	3	Bryon Russell	6 ft 7 in (2.01 m)	225 lb (102 kg)	1970–12–31	Long Beach State
G	9	John Starks	6 ft 3 in (1.91 m)	180 lb (82 kg)	1965–08–10	Oklahoma State
G/F	2	DeShawn Stevenson	6 ft 5 in (1.96 m)	218 lb (99 kg)	1981–04–03	Washington Union HS (CA)
G	12	John Stockton	6 ft 1 in (1.85 m)	175 lb (79 kg)	1962–03–26	Gonzaga

Coaches
Head coach
- Jerry Sloan
Assistant(s)
- Gordon Chiesa
- David Fredman
- Phil Johnson
- Kenny Natt
- Mark McKown (player development)

Legend
- (DP) Unsigned draft pick
- (FA) Free agent
- (S) Suspended
- Injured

Roster

== Regular season ==
=== Season standings ===
Midwest Division	W	L	PCT	GB	Home	Road	Div
y-San Antonio Spurs	58	24	.707	–	32–9	26–15	21–3
x-Dallas Mavericks	57	25	.695	1	30–11	27–14	16–8
x-Minnesota Timberwolves	50	32	.610	8	29–12	21–20	15–9
x-Utah Jazz	44	38	.537	14	25–16	19–22	8–16
e-Houston Rockets	28	54	.341	30	18–23	10–31	9–15
e-Denver Nuggets	27	55	.329	31	20–21	7–34	8–16
e-Memphis Grizzlies	23	59	.280	35	15–26	8–33	7–17

#	Western Conference				
#	Team	W	L	PCT	GB
1	z-Sacramento Kings	61	21	.744	–
2	y-San Antonio Spurs	58	24	.707	3
3	x-Los Angeles Lakers	58	24	.707	3
4	x-Dallas Mavericks	57	25	.695	4
5	x-Minnesota Timberwolves	50	32	.610	11
6	x-Portland Trail Blazers	49	33	.598	12
7	x-Seattle SuperSonics	45	37	.549	16
8	x-Utah Jazz	44	38	.537	17
9	e-Los Angeles Clippers	39	43	.476	22
10	e-Phoenix Suns	36	46	.439	25
11	e-Houston Rockets	28	54	.341	33
12	e-Denver Nuggets	27	55	.329	34
13	e-Memphis Grizzlies	23	59	.280	38
14	e-Golden State Warriors	21	61	.256	40

== Playoffs ==
2002 playoff game log
First round: 1–3 (home: 0–2; road: 1–1)

Game	Date	Team	Score	High points	High rebounds	High assists	Location Attendance	Series
1	April 20	@ Sacramento	L 86–89	Karl Malone (25)	Donyell Marshall (10)	John Stockton (12)	ARCO Arena; 17,317	0–1
2	April 23	@ Sacramento	W 93–86	Donyell Marshall (19)	Karl Malone (12)	John Stockton (12)	ARCO Arena; 17,317	1–1
3	April 27	Sacramento	L 87–90	Karl Malone (23)	Malone, Russell (6)	Malone, Stockton (7)	Delta Center; 19,911	1–2
4	April 29	Sacramento	L 86–91	Karl Malone (14)	Greg Ostertag (15)	John Stockton (9)	Delta Center; 19,911	1–3

2002 schedule

== Player statistics ==
Legend
GP	Games played	GS	Games started	MPG	Minutes per game
FG%	Field-goal percentage	3P%	3-point field-goal percentage	FT%	Free-throw percentage
RPG	Rebounds per game	APG	Assists per game	SPG	Steals per game
BPG	Blocks per game	PPG	Points per game

=== Season ===
Player	GP	GS	MPG	FG%	3FG%	FT%	RPG	APG	SPG	BPG	PPG
John Amaechi	54	0	10.9	.325		.638	2.0	.5	.1	.2	3.2
Jarron Collins	70	68	20.6	.461	.000	.740	4.2	.8	.4	.3	6.4
John Crotty	41	0	19.6	.471	.449	.864	1.8	3.4	.5	.0	6.9
Andrei Kirilenko	82	40	26.2	.450	.250	.768	4.9	1.1	1.4	1.9	10.7
Rusty LaRue	33	0	16.4	.395	.340	.857	1.5	2.2	.5	.2	5.8
Quincy Lewis	36	19	13.6	.448	.167	.650	1.2	1.0	.6	.3	4.0
Karl Malone	80	80	38.0	.454	.360	.797	8.6	4.3	1.9	.7	22.4
Donyell Marshall	58	42	30.2	.519	.310	.708	7.6	1.7	.9	1.2	14.8
Greg Ostertag	74	14	15.0	.453		.485	4.2	.7	.2	1.5	3.3
Scott Padgett	75	1	17.3	.476	.434	.735	3.8	1.1	.6	.2	6.7
Bryon Russell	66	40	30.3	.380	.341	.821	4.5	2.1	1.0	.3	9.6
John Starks	66	1	14.1	.368	.305	.805	1.0	1.1	.5	.0	4.4
DeShawn Stevenson	67	23	16.9	.385	.080	.698	2.0	1.7	.4	.4	4.9
John Stockton	82	82	31.3	.517	.321	.857	3.2	8.2	1.9	.3	13.4

=== Playoffs ===
Player	GP	GS	MPG	FG%	3FG%	FT%	RPG	APG	SPG	BPG	PPG
Jarron Collins	4	4	11.8	.556		1.000	1.8	.0	.0	.0	5.5
Andrei Kirilenko	4	4	30.5	.393	.000	.813	3.8	1.0	1.8	2.5	8.8
Rusty LaRue	4	0	13.3	.375	.400	.600	1.5	1.5	.3	.0	5.0
Quincy Lewis	4	0	14.0	.348	.200	.000	.8	.5	.5	.3	4.3
Karl Malone	4	4	40.8	.411	.000	.714	7.5	4.5	1.3	.8	20.0
Donyell Marshall	4	0	31.0	.420	.500	.750	7.8	2.8	.8	1.5	14.3
Greg Ostertag	4	0	21.8	.619		.100	8.5	.5	.5	1.5	6.8
Scott Padgett	4	0	11.8	.462	.000	.800	3.5	.5	.3	.3	4.0
Bryon Russell	4	4	30.0	.250	.400	1.000	4.3	1.8	1.0	.0	7.0
John Stockton	4	4	35.3	.450	.286	.923	4.0	10.0	2.8	.3	12.5

Player statistics citation:

== Awards and records ==
- Andrei Kirilenko, NBA All-Rookie Team 1st Team
