= 2001–02 Memphis Grizzlies season =

- Head coach: Sidney Lowe
- President: Dick Versace
- General manager: Billy Knight
- Owner: Michael Heisley
- Arena: Pyramid Arena

Results
- Record: 23–59 (.280)
- Place: Division: 7th (Midwest); Conference: 13th (Western)
- Playoff finish: Did not qualify
- Stats at Basketball Reference

Local media
- Television: Fox Sports Net South, WMC, WPXX
- Radio: WREC

The 2001–02 Memphis Grizzlies season was the seventh season for the Memphis Grizzlies in the National Basketball Association, and their first season in Memphis, Tennessee. After six seasons of struggling in Vancouver, British Columbia, Canada, the Grizzlies moved to the United States of America, relocated to Memphis, Tennessee, and became the "Memphis Grizzlies". Although it was the first NBA team for the city, Memphis played home to an American Basketball Association team known as the Memphis Sounds from 1970 to 1975. The Grizzlies also moved into a new arena known as the Pyramid Arena.

== Season summary ==
=== Off-season ===
The Grizzlies received the sixth overall pick in the 2001 NBA draft, and selected small forward Shane Battier from Duke University. The Grizzlies also made two separate trades on draft day. The team acquired rookie power forward, first-round draft pick and Spanish basketball star Pau Gasol, Brevin Knight, and former University of Memphis star Lorenzen Wright from the Atlanta Hawks; Gasol was drafted by the Hawks as the third overall pick. The Grizzlies also acquired Jason Williams and Nick Anderson from the Sacramento Kings. During the off-season, the team signed free agent Rodney Buford. Prior to the regular season, Bryant Reeves suffered a preseason back injury and would miss the entire season.

For the season, the Grizzlies slightly updated their primary logo, replacing the city name "Vancouver" with "Memphis" above the team name "Grizzlies", and above their original logo of a grizzly bear holding a basketball. The team also slightly updated their home and road uniforms, replacing "Vancouver" with "Memphis" on the front of their jerseys. The team's updated primary logo and uniforms would both remain in use until 2004, although the uniforms were slightly changed next season, where they replaced the team's alternate logo with their primary logo on their shorts.

=== Regular season ===
The Grizzlies made their NBA regular season debut at the Pyramid Arena on November 1, 2001, in which the team lost to the Detroit Pistons by a score of 90–80. Despite the addition of Gasol, Battier, Williams and Wright, the team lost their first eight games of the season, as Michael Dickerson suffered a groin injury after only just four games, and was out for the remainder of the season. On November 17, the Grizzlies won their first game by defeating the Cleveland Cavaliers, 98–93 at the Pyramid Arena for the franchise's first win in Memphis.

After a three-game winning streak, the team posted a seven-game losing streak in January, and later on held a 14–35 record at the All-Star break. The Grizzlies posted an eight-game losing streak between February and March, while losing 10 of their 12 games in February, and then later on posted a six-game losing streak in March. At mid-season, the team released Isaac Austin to free agency after 21 games. The Grizzlies finished in last place in the Midwest Division with a 23–59 record, which was the same record as their previous season in Vancouver; the team missed the NBA playoffs for the seventh consecutive year.

Gasol averaged 17.6 points, 8.9 rebounds and 2.1 blocks per game, and was named the NBA Rookie of the Year, while Battier averaged 14.4 points, 5.4 rebounds and 1.6 steals per game, and contributed 103 three-point field goals; Gasol and Battier were both named to the NBA All-Rookie First Team. In addition, Williams contributed 14.8 points, 8.0 assists and 1.7 steals per game, and led the Grizzlies with 127 three-point field goals, but only shot .295 in three-point field-goal percentage, while Wright provided the team with 12.0 points and 9.4 rebounds per game, but only played just 43 games due to a knee injury, and second-year forward Stromile Swift provided with 11.8 points, 6.3 rebounds and 1.7 blocks per game off the bench. Meanwhile, Dickerson contributed 10.8 points per game during his short four-game stint, Buford averaged 9.4 points and 4.3 rebounds per game, Knight contributed 7.0 points, 5.7 assists and 1.5 steals per game, Grant Long averaged 6.3 points and 3.5 rebounds per game, and Tony Massenburg provided with 5.5 points and 4.4 rebounds per game.

During the NBA All-Star weekend at the First Union Center in Philadelphia, Pennsylvania, Gasol and Battier were both selected for the NBA Rookie Challenge Game, as members of the Rookies team; Swift was also selected for the Rookie Challenge Game, as a member of the Sophomores team, but did not participate due to injury. The Grizzlies finished 25th in the NBA in home-game attendance, with an attendance of 591,030 at the Pyramid Arena during the regular season, which was the fifth-lowest in the league.

=== Notable highlights ===
One notable highlight of the inaugural season occurred on December 21, 2001, in which the Grizzlies defeated the 2-time defending NBA champion Los Angeles Lakers at home, 114–108 at the Pyramid Arena. Williams led the Grizzlies with 26 points, while Knight scored 20 points and made 9 out of 10 field-goal attempts off the bench, and Battier contributed 19 points.

=== Aftermath ===
Following the season, Reeves retired after six seasons in the NBA, all of which he spent playing for the Grizzlies while the team was located in Vancouver. Meanwhile, Anderson was traded to the Cleveland Cavaliers on draft day, but was released to free agency, and Buford, Long and Massenburg were all released.

== Draft picks ==
Round	Pick	Player	Position	Nationality	College
1	6	Shane Battier	SF/SG	United States	Duke
1	27	Jamaal Tinsley	PG	United States	Iowa State
2	32	Will Solomon	PG	United States	Clemson
2	48	Antonis Fotsis (from New York)	SF	Greece	Panathinaikos (Greece)

The 2001 NBA Draft was the final time that the Vancouver Grizzlies made an NBA Draft appearance, as the team would relocate to Memphis in July 2001. The team entered the draft with four selections: two first-round and two second-round picks. It consisted of their original picks and one acquired through previous trades in each round.

== Roster ==
2001–02 Memphis Grizzlies roster
Players

Pos.	No.	Player	Height	Weight	DOB	From
G	25	Nick Anderson (injured)	6 ft 6 in (1.98 m)	205 lb (93 kg)	1968–01–20	Illinois
G/F	31	Shane Battier	6 ft 8 in (2.03 m)	220 lb (100 kg)	1978–09–09	Duke
G	32	Rodney Buford	6 ft 5 in (1.96 m)	189 lb (86 kg)	1977–11–02	Creighton
G	8	Michael Dickerson (injured)	6 ft 5 in (1.96 m)	190 lb (86 kg)	1975–06–25	Arizona
F	6	Antonis Fotsis	6 ft 10 in (2.08 m)	210 lb (95 kg)	1981–04–01	Greece
F/C	16	Pau Gasol	7 ft 0 in (2.13 m)	250 lb (113 kg)	1980–07–06	Spain
G	7	Eddie Gill	6 ft 0 in (1.83 m)	190 lb (86 kg)	1978–08–16	Weber State
G	22	Brevin Knight	5 ft 10 in (1.78 m)	173 lb (78 kg)	1975–11–08	Stanford
F	43	Grant Long	6 ft 8 in (2.03 m)	225 lb (102 kg)	1966–03–12	Eastern Michigan
F	34	Tony Massenburg	6 ft 9 in (2.06 m)	220 lb (100 kg)	1967–07–31	Maryland
C	50	Bryant Reeves (injured) (IN)	7 ft 0 in (2.13 m)	290 lb (132 kg)	1973–06–08	Oklahoma State
G	5	Elliot Perry	6 ft 0 in (1.83 m)	150 lb (68 kg)	1969–03–28	Memphis
G	1	Will Solomon	6 ft 6 in (1.98 m)	195 lb (88 kg)	1978–07–20	Auburn
F	4	Stromile Swift	6 ft 9 in (2.06 m)	225 lb (102 kg)	1979–11–21	LSU
G	2	Jason Williams	6 ft 1 in (1.85 m)	180 lb (82 kg)	1975–11–18	Florida
C	42	Lorenzen Wright	6 ft 11 in (2.11 m)	255 lb (116 kg)	1975–11–04	Memphis

Coaches
Head coach
- Sidney Lowe
Assistant(s)
- Michael Adams
- Mitchell Anderson
- Scott Roth
- Bob Staak

Legend
- (DP) Unsigned draft pick
- (FA) Free agent
- (S) Suspended
- (IN) Inactive
- Injured

Roster

=== Roster notes ===
- Center Bryant Reeves was on the injured reserve list due to a preseason back injury, and missed the entire regular season.

== Regular season ==
=== Season standings ===
Midwest Division	W	L	PCT	GB	Home	Road	Div
y-San Antonio Spurs	58	24	.707	–	32–9	26–15	21–3
x-Dallas Mavericks	57	25	.695	1	30–11	27–14	16–8
x-Minnesota Timberwolves	50	32	.610	8	29–12	21–20	15–9
x-Utah Jazz	44	38	.537	14	25–16	19–22	8–16
e-Houston Rockets	28	54	.341	30	18–23	10–31	9–15
e-Denver Nuggets	27	55	.329	31	20–21	7–34	8–16
e-Memphis Grizzlies	23	59	.280	35	15–26	8–33	7–17

#	Western Conference				
#	Team	W	L	PCT	GB
1	z-Sacramento Kings	61	21	.744	–
2	y-San Antonio Spurs	58	24	.707	3
3	x-Los Angeles Lakers	58	24	.707	3
4	x-Dallas Mavericks	57	25	.695	4
5	x-Minnesota Timberwolves	50	32	.610	11
6	x-Portland Trail Blazers	49	33	.598	12
7	x-Seattle SuperSonics	45	37	.549	16
8	x-Utah Jazz	44	38	.537	17
9	e-Los Angeles Clippers	39	43	.476	22
10	e-Phoenix Suns	36	46	.439	25
11	e-Houston Rockets	28	54	.341	33
12	e-Denver Nuggets	27	55	.329	34
13	e-Memphis Grizzlies	23	59	.280	38
14	e-Golden State Warriors	21	61	.256	40

=== Game log ===
Game	Date	Opponent	Result	Grizzlies score	Opponent score	Record	OT

== Player statistics ==
=== Regular season ===
Player	POS	GP	GS	MP	REB	AST	STL	BLK	PTS	MPG	RPG	APG	SPG	BPG	PPG
Pau Gasol	PF	82	79	3,007	730	223	41	169	1,441	36.7	8.9	2.7	.5	2.1	17.6
Shane Battier	SF	78	78	3,097	418	216	121	81	1,125	39.7	5.4	2.8	1.6	1.0	14.4
Tony Massenburg	PF	73	31	1,247	324	26	30	31	403	17.1	4.4	.4	.4	.4	5.5
Stromile Swift	PF	68	14	1,805	430	50	53	113	803	26.5	6.3	.7	.8	1.7	11.8
Grant Long	PF	66	56	1,868	231	136	63	12	417	28.3	3.5	2.1	1.0	.2	6.3
Jason Williams	PG	65	65	2,236	195	519	111	7	959	34.4	3.0	8.0	1.7	.1	14.8
Rodney Buford	SG	63	21	1,769	272	71	42	12	591	28.1	4.3	1.1	.7	.2	9.4
Will Solomon	SG	62	4	872	68	92	35	7	321	14.1	1.1	1.5	.6	.1	5.2
Brevin Knight	PG	53	11	1,151	109	302	79	7	371	21.7	2.1	5.7	1.5	.1	7.0
Lorenzen Wright	C	43	33	1,251	405	44	30	23	516	29.1	9.4	1.0	.7	.5	12.0
Antonis Fotsis	PF	28	1	320	62	10	9	11	108	11.4	2.2	.4	.3	.4	3.9
Eddie Gill	PG	23	5	384	28	49	11	3	116	16.7	1.2	2.1	.5	.1	5.0
Isaac Austin	C	21	8	307	71	13	9	5	76	14.6	3.4	.6	.4	.2	3.6
Nick Anderson	SG	15	0	219	33	14	6	6	60	14.6	2.2	.9	.4	.4	4.0
Isaac Fontaine	SG	6	0	75	5	4	0	0	11	12.5	.8	.7	.0	.0	1.8
Michael Dickerson	SG	4	4	124	12	9	3	1	43	31.0	3.0	2.3	.8	.3	10.8
Elliot Perry	PG	2	0	48	4	7	3	0	11	24.0	2.0	3.5	1.5	.0	5.5

== Awards and records ==
=== Awards ===
Pau Gasol 2001–2002 NBA Rookie of the Year Award.

Pau Gasol 2001–2002 NBA All-Rookie Team

Shane Battier 2001–2002 NBA All-Rookie Team

== See also ==
- 2001–02 NBA season
