= Eddie Griffin (basketball) =

American basketball player (1982–2007)

Personal information
- Born: May 30, 1982 Philadelphia, Pennsylvania, U.S.
- Died: August 17, 2007 (aged 25) Houston, Texas, U.S.
- Listed height: 6 ft 9 in (2.06 m)
- Listed weight: 222 lb (101 kg)

Career information
- High school: Roman Catholic (Philadelphia, Pennsylvania)
- College: Seton Hall (2000–2001)
- NBA draft: 2001: 1st round, 7th overall pick
- Drafted by: New Jersey Nets
- Playing career: 2001–2007
- Position: Power forward / center
- Number: 33, 41

Career history
- 2001–2003: Houston Rockets
- 2004–2007: Minnesota Timberwolves

Career highlights
- NBA All-Rookie Second Team (2002); USBWA National Freshman of the Year (2001); First-team Parade All-American (2000); McDonald's All-American (2000)

Career NBA statistics
- Points: 2,171 (7.2 ppg)
- Rebounds: 1,744 (5.8 rpg)
- Assists: 236 (0.8 apg)
- Stats at NBA.com
- Stats at Basketball Reference

Eddie Jamaal Griffin (May 30, 1982 – August 17, 2007) was an American professional basketball player from Philadelphia. He last played for the NBA's Minnesota Timberwolves, who waived him on March 13, 2007. Months later, he was killed in a car crash.

== College career ==
After a standout career at Roman Catholic High School of Philadelphia in which he was named Parade's National Player of the Year, he competed in the McDonald's All-American Game and led Roman to the Philadelphia Catholic League Championship in his junior and senior years. However, in a harbinger of things to come, Griffin was forced to finish his senior year via correspondence courses after getting in a fight with a teammate.

As a freshman, Griffin averaged 17.8 points, 10.7 rebounds, and 4.4 blocks for Seton Hall and was at one point thought to be a potential top pick in the 2001 NBA draft. He was named the nation's Freshman of the Year by Sporting News.

In January 2001, Griffin got in a fight with teammate Ty Shine. Griffin left the school in somewhat acrimonious circumstances after his freshman year, and made himself available for the NBA Draft. Shortly before the draft, Griffin's half-brother Marvin Powell died of a heart attack.

== NBA career ==
Despite Griffin's freshman year at Seton Hall, the lingering question about his attitude saw him slip to the seventh overall pick of the 2001 NBA draft, where he was selected by the New Jersey Nets, who immediately traded the rights to him over to the Houston Rockets in exchange for those to Jason Collins, Brandon Armstrong, and Richard Jefferson (all of whom selected likewise in the 2001 draft).

In his rookie year, Griffin played in 73 games (starting 24) while averaging 8.8 points, 5.7 rebounds, and 1.84 blocks per game (ranking 13th in the NBA in that category). He followed this in 2002-03 with per-game averages of 8.6 points, 6.0 rebounds, and 1.44 blocks.

Off the court, Griffin suffered from alcoholism, and his troubles piled up quickly over the ensuing year. In December 2003, the Rockets released him after he missed practices and engaged in a team fight. Griffin signed with the Nets in January 2004, only to miss the entire 2003–04 season, when he entered an alcohol rehabilitation center.

Prior to the 2004–05 season, the Timberwolves signed Griffin to a one-year contract, for which season he posted roughly the same numbers as he had done for his previous two. The Timberwolves re-signed Griffin for three years (player option in the third), starting with the 2005–06 season. Griffin had a significant drop-off in scoring and rebounding, albeit while suffering only a slight decrease in minutes and while averaging a career-high in blocks per game (2.11).

On March 30, 2006, Griffin was involved in a car crash. Witnesses and friends stated that he was watching a "pornographic movie on a DVD in his vehicle, and was masturbating". After the accident, he proceeded to enter a nearby convenience store, where, as per the store's security camera footage, he lamented his being drunk and without driver's license to the clerk; it also showed Griffin begging the man whose SUV he had struck not to call the police and promising to buy him a new car in exchange.

Griffin's final NBA game was played on December 13, 2006, in an 82–95 Timberwolves loss to the San Antonio Spurs. Griffin played for 48 seconds and recorded no stats except for a missed three-pointer, his only such attempt of the season. In March 2007, Griffin was released by the Timberwolves.

In 303 NBA games (117 starts), Griffin averaged 7.2 points, 5.8 rebounds, 0.8 assists, 1.7 blocks, and 22:12 of floor time per game.

== Death ==
Griffin died as a result of a car crash on August 17, 2007, at approximately 1:30 a.m. Houston police said in a report that Griffin ignored a railroad warning and went through a barrier before striking a moving train. The resulting fire burned Griffin's SUV and the side of a railcar carrying plastic granules. Griffin's body was badly burned and there was no initial identification. Dental records later revealed the man was Griffin. He had more than three times the legal alcohol limit in his system when he crashed, according to an autopsy report. The Harris County Medical Examiner's office said the 25-year-old Griffin died of "multiple blunt force injuries." The medical examiner's office performed tests on Griffin's bile and blood from his heart and liver and determined his blood-alcohol level was 0.26; the legal limit in Texas is 0.08. Tests found no traces of cocaine, barbiturates or any other narcotics. Former Timberwolves coach Dwane Casey said he had not talked to Griffin in five or six months, but he knew that Griffin was spending the summer trying to get back in shape to play in Europe the next season. He was buried in Northwood Cemetery in Philadelphia. At the time of his death he had a three-year-old daughter named Amaree.

== NBA career statistics ==
Legend
GP	Games played	GS	Games started	MPG	Minutes per game
FG%	Field goal percentage	3P%	3-point field goal percentage	FT%	Free throw percentage
RPG	Rebounds per game	APG	Assists per game	SPG	Steals per game
BPG	Blocks per game	PPG	Points per game	**Bold**	Career high

=== Regular season ===
Year	Team	GP	GS	MPG	FG%	3P%	FT%	RPG	APG	SPG	BPG	PPG
2001–02	Houston	73	24	**26.0**	.366	.330	.744	5.7	.7	.2	1.8	**8.8**
2002–03	Houston	**77**	**66**	24.5	**.400**	**.333**	.617	6.0	**1.1**	**.7**	1.4	8.6
2004–05	Minnesota	70	0	21.3	.387	.328	.718	**6.5**	.8	.3	1.7	7.5
2005–06	Minnesota	70	27	19.4	.351	.195	.595	5.6	.6	.2	**2.1**	4.6
2006–07	Minnesota	13	0	7.1	.259	.000	**.800**	1.9	.3	.0	.5	1.4
Career		303	117	22.2	.377	.315	.671	5.8	.8	.3	1.7	7.2

== See also ==
- List of basketball players who died during their careers
