= 2001–02 Los Angeles Lakers season =

Pro basketball team season (won NBA championship)

- NBA champions
- Conference champions
- Head coach: Phil Jackson
- General manager: Mitch Kupchak
- Owner: Jerry Buss
- Arena: Staples Center

Results
- Record: 58–24 (.707)
- Place: Division: 2nd (Pacific); Conference: 3rd (Western)
- Playoff finish: NBA champions (Defeated Nets 4–0)
- Stats at Basketball Reference

Local media
- Television: KCAL-TV; Fox Sports Net West
- Radio: KLAC

The 2001–02 Los Angeles Lakers season was the 54th season for the Los Angeles Lakers in the National Basketball Association, and their 42nd season in Los Angeles, California. The Lakers entered the regular season as the 2-time defending NBA champions, having defeated the Philadelphia 76ers in five games in the 2001 NBA Finals, winning their 13th NBA championship.

== Season summary ==
=== Off-season ===
During the off-season, the team signed free agents, All-Star guard Mitch Richmond and Samaki Walker, and acquired Lindsey Hunter from the Milwaukee Bucks.

=== Regular season ===
The Lakers got off to a fast start by winning their first seven games of the regular season, leading to a successful 16–1 start after a nine-game winning streak between November and December, and holding a 33–13 record at the All-Star break. The Lakers finished in second place in the Pacific Division with a 58–24 record, and earned the third seed in the Western Conference; the team qualified for the NBA playoffs for the eighth consecutive year.

Shaquille O'Neal averaged 27.2 points, 10.7 rebounds and 2.0 blocks per game, while Kobe Bryant averaged 25.2 points, 5.5 rebounds, 5.5 assists and 1.5 steals per game, and Derek Fisher provided the team with 11.2 points per game, and also led them with 144 three-point field goals. In addition, Rick Fox contributed 7.9 points, 4.7 rebounds and 3.5 assists per game, while Robert Horry provided with 6.8 points and 5.9 rebounds per game, and Walker averaged 6.7 points and 7.0 rebounds per game. Meanwhile, Hunter contributed 5.8 points per game, and Richmond provided with 4.1 points per game.

During the NBA All-Star weekend at the First Union Center in Philadelphia, Pennsylvania, O'Neal and Bryant were both selected for the 2002 NBA All-Star Game, as members of the Western Conference All-Star team; although O'Neal did not participate due to an injury for the second year in a row. Bryant scored 31 points along with 5 rebounds and 5 assists, and was named the NBA All-Star Game Most Valuable Player, despite being booed by the hometown crowd in Philadelphia, as the Western Conference defeated the Eastern Conference, 135–120. Bryant and O'Neal were both named to the All-NBA First Team, while Bryant was selected to the NBA All-Defensive Second Team; O'Neal finished in third place in Most Valuable Player voting with 15 first-place votes (696 points), and Bryant finished in fifth place in MVP voting with 1 first-place vote. Bryant also finished tied in third place in Defensive Player of the Year voting.

The Lakers finished eighth in the NBA in home-game attendance, with an attendance of 778,777 at the Staples Center during the regular season.

=== NBA playoffs ===
In the Western Conference First Round of the 2002 NBA playoffs, and for the third consecutive year, the Lakers faced off against the 6th–seeded Portland Trail Blazers, a team that featured All-Star forward Rasheed Wallace, Bonzi Wells and Damon Stoudamire. The Lakers won the first two games over the Trail Blazers at home at the Staples Center, before winning Game 3 on the road, 92–91 at the Rose Garden Arena to win the series in a three-game sweep. It was the fifth time in the last six seasons that the Lakers won an NBA playoff series over the Trail Blazers.

In the Western Conference Semi-finals, and for the second consecutive year, the team faced off against the 2nd–seeded, and Midwest Division champion San Antonio Spurs, who were led by All-Star forward, and Most Valuable Player of the Year, Tim Duncan, All-Star center David Robinson, and rookie point guard Tony Parker. Despite both teams finishing with the same regular-season record, and the Spurs winning the Midwest Division title, the Lakers had home-court advantage in the series. The Lakers won Game 1 over the Spurs at the Staples Center, 86–80, but then lost Game 2 at home, 88–85 as the Spurs evened the series. The Lakers managed to win the next two games on the road at the Alamodome, before winning Game 5 over the Spurs at the Staples Center, 93–87 to win the series in five games.

In the Western Conference Finals, and also for the third consecutive year, the Lakers faced off against the top–seeded, and Pacific Division champion Sacramento Kings, who were led by the trio of All-Star forward Chris Webber, All-Star forward Peja Stojaković, and Mike Bibby. However, the Kings started the series without Stojaković, who was out due to an ankle injury, in which he suffered in Game 3 of the Western Conference Semi-finals against the Dallas Mavericks. The Lakers won Game 1 over the Kings on the road, 106–99 at the ARCO Arena II, but then lost the next two games, before winning Game 4 over the Kings at home, 100–99 at the Staples Center to even the series. With Stojaković coming back from his ankle injury, the Kings defeated the Lakers in Game 5 at the ARCO Arena II, 92–91 to take a 3–2 series lead. However, the Lakers won Game 6 over the Kings at the Staples Center, 106–102, and then won Game 7 at the ARCO Arena II in overtime, 112–106 to win in a hard-fought seven-game series, and advance to the NBA Finals for the third consecutive year.

Game 6 of the Lakers-Kings series was one of the most controversial games in NBA history, due to the calls made by the referees, most of which were to the detriment of the Kings, and with the Lakers winning, 106–102 to even the series. Game 7 of the Western Conference Finals on June 2, 2002, brought in a total of 23.8 million viewers, making it the most-watched Western Conference Finals game in NBA history.

In the 2002 NBA Finals, the Lakers faced off against the top–seeded New Jersey Nets, who were led by the trio of All-Star guard Jason Kidd, second-year star Kenyon Martin, and Keith Van Horn. The Lakers won the first two games over the Nets at the Staples Center, and then won the next two games on the road, including a Game 4 win over the Nets at the Continental Airlines Arena, 113–107 to win the series in a four-game sweep; the Lakers won their third consecutive NBA championship for their second three-peat in franchise history, the first since 1952–54, as O'Neal was named the NBA Finals Most Valuable Player for the third straight year. This season marked the third and last of the Lakers' three-peat championships into the new millennium.

=== Aftermath ===
Following the season, Richmond retired ending his fourteen-year career in the NBA, and Hunter was traded to the Toronto Raptors on draft day. The Lakers would not win another title until 2009, in which they defeated the Orlando Magic in five games. As of 2026, the 2001–02 Lakers are the most recent North American professional sports team to have accomplished a three-peat.

== Draft picks ==
- The Los Angeles Lakers did not have any Draft Picks.
- The Lakers owned the 27th Pick Overall and it was sent to New York.
- They also owned the 56th Pick Overall and it was sent to San Antonio.

== Roster ==
2001–02 Los Angeles Lakers roster
Players

Pos.	No.	Player	Height	Weight	DOB	From
G/F	8	Kobe Bryant	6 ft 6 in (1.98 m)	205 lb (93 kg)	1978–08–23	Lower Merion HS (PA)
G	2	Derek Fisher	6 ft 1 in (1.85 m)	210 lb (95 kg)	1974–08–09	Little Rock
F	17	Rick Fox	6 ft 7 in (2.01 m)	230 lb (104 kg)	1969–07–24	North Carolina
F	3	Devean George	6 ft 8 in (2.03 m)	235 lb (107 kg)	1977–08–29	Augsburg
F	5	Robert Horry	6 ft 10 in (2.08 m)	240 lb (109 kg)	1970–08–25	Alabama
G	10	Lindsey Hunter	6 ft 2 in (1.88 m)	195 lb (88 kg)	1970–12–03	Jackson State
F	35	Mark Madsen	6 ft 9 in (2.06 m)	240 lb (109 kg)	1976–01–28	Stanford
F/C	6	Jelani McCoy	6 ft 10 in (2.08 m)	245 lb (111 kg)	1977–12–06	UCLA
C	14	Slava Medvedenko	6 ft 10 in (2.08 m)	253 lb (115 kg)	1979–04–04	Ukraine
C	34	Shaquille O'Neal	7 ft 1 in (2.16 m)	325 lb (147 kg)	1972–03–06	LSU
G/F	23	Mitch Richmond	6 ft 5 in (1.96 m)	215 lb (98 kg)	1965–06–30	Kansas State
G	20	Brian Shaw	6 ft 6 in (1.98 m)	190 lb (86 kg)	1966–03–22	UC Santa Barbara
F/C	52	Samaki Walker	6 ft 9 in (2.06 m)	250 lb (113 kg)	1976–02–25	Louisville

Coaches
Head coach
- Phil Jackson
Assistant(s)
- Jim Cleamons
- Frank Hamblen
- Kurt Rambis
- Tex Winter
- Gary Vitti (trainer)

Legend
- (DP) Unsigned draft pick
- (FA) Free agent
- (S) Suspended
- Injured

Roster
Updated: November 24, 2001

== Regular season ==
=== Season standings ===
Pacific Division	W	L	PCT	GB	Home	Road	Div
y-Sacramento Kings	61	21	.744	–	36–5	25–16	15–9
x-Los Angeles Lakers	58	24	.707	3	34–7	24–17	16–8
x-Portland Trail Blazers	49	33	.598	12	30–11	19–22	14–10
x-Seattle SuperSonics	45	37	.549	16	26–15	19–22	13–11
e-Los Angeles Clippers	39	43	.476	22	25–16	14–27	9–15
e-Phoenix Suns	36	46	.439	25	23–18	13–28	12–12
e-Golden State Warriors	21	61	.256	40	14–27	7–34	5–19

#	Western Conference				
#	Team	W	L	PCT	GB
1	z-Sacramento Kings	61	21	.744	–
2	y-San Antonio Spurs	58	24	.707	3
3	x-Los Angeles Lakers	58	24	.707	3
4	x-Dallas Mavericks	57	25	.695	4
5	x-Minnesota Timberwolves	50	32	.610	11
6	x-Portland Trail Blazers	49	33	.598	12
7	x-Seattle SuperSonics	45	37	.549	16
8	x-Utah Jazz	44	38	.537	17
9	e-Los Angeles Clippers	39	43	.476	22
10	e-Phoenix Suns	36	46	.439	25
11	e-Houston Rockets	28	54	.341	33
12	e-Denver Nuggets	27	55	.329	34
13	e-Memphis Grizzlies	23	59	.280	38
14	e-Golden State Warriors	21	61	.256	40

== Game log ==
=== Pre-season ===
2001 preseason game log
Total: 4–4
Preseason

Game	Date	Team	Score	High points	High rebounds	High assists	Location Attendance	Record
1	October 7	Golden State	L 89-99	Kobe Bryant (30)	Robert Horry (7)	Kobe Bryant (5)	Stan Sheriff Center (Honolulu, HI); 10,300	0–1
2	October 9	Golden State	L 88-113	Lindsey Hunter (13)	Dickey Simpkins (9)	Isaac Fontaine (4)	Stan Sheriff Center (Honolulu, HI); 9,227	0–2
3	October 16	Golden State	W 114-97	Kobe Bryant (23)	Shaquille O'Neal (10)	Bryant & Hunter (6)	Centennial Garden (Bakersfield, CA)	1–2
4	October 19	Phoenix	L 101–112	Kobe Bryant (25)	Fox & O'Neal (6)		San Diego Sports Arena (San Diego, CA)	1–3
5	October 20	Sacramento	L 104-109	Kobe Bryant (30)	Shaquille O'Neal (10)	3 players tied (4)	Thomas & Mack Center (Las Vegas, NV); 17,982	1–4
6	October 23	Memphis	W 128-94	Kobe Bryant (24)	Samaki Walker (10)	Kobe Bryant (9)	Arrowhead Pond (Anaheim, CA); 17,457	2–4
7	October 25	Milwaukee	W 109-107	Shaquille O'Neal (31)	O'Neal & Walker (7)	Bryant & O'Neal (5)	Staples Center; 15,062	3–4
8	October 26	Phoenix	W 90-71	George & O'Neal (15)	Shaquille O'Neal (12)	Kobe Bryant (7)	Staples Center; 16,287	4-4

2001–02 season schedule

=== Regular season ===
2001–02 game log
Total: 58–24 (Home: 34–7; Road: 24–17)
October: 1–0 (home: 1–0; road: 0–0)

Game	Date	Team	Score	High points	High rebounds	High assists	Location Attendance	Record
1	October 30	Portland	W 98–87	Bryant & O'Neal (29)	Shaquille O'Neal (18)	Shaquille O'Neal (5)	Staples Center; 18,997	1–0

November: 13–1 (home: 8–0; road: 5–1)

Game	Date	Team	Score	High points	High rebounds	High assists	Location Attendance	Record
2	November 1	@ Utah	W 105–101	Kobe Bryant (39)	Rick Fox (8)	Kobe Bryant (8)	Delta Center; 19,539	2–0
3	November 2	Phoenix	W 117–94	Shaquille O'Neal (36)	Shaquille O'Neal (13)	Kobe Bryant (9)	Staples Center; 18,997	3–0
4	November 4	Utah	W 100–96	Kobe Bryant (38)	Shaquille O'Neal (8)	Kobe Bryant (7)	Staples Center; 18,997	4–0
5	November 9	Memphis	W 110–86	Shaquille O'Neal (20)	Shaquille O'Neal (8)	Kobe Bryant (7)	Staples Center; 18,997	5–0
6	November 11	Orlando	W 108–95	Shaquille O'Neal (38)	Shaquille O'Neal (18)	Kobe Bryant (8)	Staples Center; 18,997	6–0
7	November 15	@ Houston	W 98–97 (OT)	Kobe Bryant (31)	Shaquille O'Neal (13)	Rick Fox (6)	Compaq Center; 16,285	7–0
8	November 16	@ Phoenix	L 83–95	Shaquille O'Neal (28)	Shaquille O'Neal (12)	Kobe Bryant (5)	America West Arena; 19,023	7–1
9	November 18	Sacramento	W 93–85	Kobe Bryant (29)	Shaquille O'Neal (15)	Kobe Bryant (8)	Staples Center; 18,997	8–1
10	November 20	@ L.A. Clippers	W 98–93	Kobe Bryant (25)	Shaquille O'Neal (11)	Kobe Bryant (12)	Staples Center; 20,316	9–1
11	November 21	@ Denver	W 89–68	Kobe Bryant (24)	Bryant & O'Neal (13)	Kobe Bryant (7)	Pepsi Center; 19,521	10–1
12	November 23	Golden State	W 106–90	Kobe Bryant (28)	Shaquille O'Neal (10)	Rick Fox (5)	Staples Center; 18,997	11–1
13	November 25	Denver	W 105–98	Kobe Bryant (25)	Kobe Bryant (7)	Kobe Bryant (7)	Staples Center; 18,997	12–1
14	November 27	Milwaukee	W 104–85	Kobe Bryant (33)	Samaki Walker (11)	Shaquille O'Neal (5)	Staples Center; 18,997	13–1
15	November 30	@ Seattle	W 107–92	Kobe Bryant (30)	Slava Medvedenko (7)	Robert Horry (8)	KeyArena; 17,072	14–1

December: 7–5 (home: 6–2; road: 1–3)

Game	Date	Team	Score	High points	High rebounds	High assists	Location Attendance	Record
16	December 1	Minnesota	W 102–76	Shaquille O'Neal (23)	Shaquille O'Neal (9)	3 players tied (5)	Staples Center; 18,997	15–1
17	December 5	Dallas	W 98–94	Shaquille O'Neal (46)	Shaquille O'Neal (15)	Rick Fox (6)	Staples Center; 18,997	16–1
18	December 7	@ Sacramento	L 91–97	Shaquille O'Neal (31)	Shaquille O'Neal (16)	Shaquille O'Neal (5)	ARCO Arena; 17,317	16–2
19	December 11	Seattle	L 93–104	Shaquille O'Neal (37)	Shaquille O'Neal (16)	Derek Fisher (8)	Staples Center; 18,997	16–3
20	December 14	L.A. Clippers	W 110–80	Shaquille O'Neal (28)	Shaquille O'Neal (15)	Kobe Bryant (7)	Staples Center; 18,997	17–3
21	December 16	Golden State	W 101–85	Kobe Bryant (28)	Shaquille O'Neal (7)	Shaquille O'Neal (6)	Staples Center; 18,997	18–3
22	December 20	@ Houston	W 107–101	Kobe Bryant (27)	Shaquille O'Neal (14)	Bryant & Horry (5)	Compaq Center; 16,285	19–3
23	December 21	@ Memphis	L 108–114	Kobe Bryant (36)	O'Neal & Walker (9)	Bryant & Fox (6)	Pyramid Arena; 19,405	19–4
24	December 25	Philadelphia	W 88–82	Samaki Walker (18)	Bryant & Horry (11)	Kobe Bryant (9)	Staples Center; 18,997	20–4
25	December 26	@ Golden State	L 90–101	Kobe Bryant (39)	Slava Medvedenko (8)	Kobe Bryant (5)	The Arena in Oakland; 20,036	20–5
26	December 28	Toronto	L 86–89	Kobe Bryant (26)	Samaki Walker (14)	Kobe Bryant (6)	Staples Center; 18,997	20–6
27	December 30	Houston	W 114–90	Bryant & Fox (16)	Robert Horry (11)	Kobe Bryant (11)	Staples Center; 18,997	21–6

January: 10–6 (home: 3–2; road: 7–4)

Game	Date	Team	Score	High points	High rebounds	High assists	Location Attendance	Record
28	January 2	@ Denver	W 87–86	Kobe Bryant (28)	Samaki Walker (11)	Rick Fox (6)	Pepsi Center; 17,932	22–6
29	January 4	Phoenix	W 118–86	Shaquille O'Neal (24)	Samaki Walker (10)	Kobe Bryant (6)	Staples Center; 18,997	23–6
30	January 6	@ Toronto	W 109–89	Kobe Bryant (31)	Samaki Walker (10)	3 players tied (4)	Air Canada Centre; 19,800	24–6
31	January 8	@ Detroit	W 121–92	Shaquille O'Neal (28)	Shaquille O'Neal (10)	Kobe Bryant (6)	The Palace of Auburn Hills; 22,076	25–6
32	January 9	@ Indiana	W 109–90	Kobe Bryant (31)	Samaki Walker (13)	Derek Fisher (6)	Conseco Fieldhouse; 18,345	26–6
33	January 11	@ Minnesota	L 102–120	Shaquille O'Neal (29)	Samaki Walker (9)	Rick Fox (9)	Target Center; 19,806	26–7
34	January 12	@ Chicago	L 104–106 (OT)	Derek Fisher (28)	Robert Horry (13)	Kobe Bryant (9)	United Center; 23,147	26–8
35	January 14	Memphis	W 120–81	Kobe Bryant (56)	Robert Horry (11)	Rick Fox (7)	Staples Center; 18,997	27–8
36	January 16	Miami	L 96–102	Kobe Bryant (29)	Samaki Walker (13)	Kobe Bryant (7)	Staples Center; 18,997	27–9
37	January 19	@ San Antonio	W 98–81	Kobe Bryant (28)	3 players tied (7)	Kobe Bryant (5)	Alamodome; 33,544	28–9
38	January 22	Denver	L 91–107	Shaquille O'Neal (40)	Shaquille O'Neal (11)	Kobe Bryant (6)	Staples Center; 18,997	28–10
39	January 23	@ L.A. Clippers	L 90–95	Kobe Bryant (27)	Samaki Walker (12)	Derek Fisher (5)	Staples Center; 20,309	28–11
40	January 25	San Antonio	W 94–91	Kobe Bryant (27)	Shaquille O'Neal (15)	Kobe Bryant (6)	Staples Center; 18,997	29–11
41	January 27	@ Philadelphia	L 87–93	Shaquille O'Neal (26)	Shaquille O'Neal (11)	Rick Fox (6)	First Union Center; 20,909	29–12
42	January 29	@ Atlanta	W 127–93	Kobe Bryant (32)	Samaki Walker (12)	Fox & Hunter (4)	Philips Arena; 19,742	30–12
43	January 30	@ Orlando	W 111–93	Shaquille O'Neal (30)	Shaquille O'Neal (14)	Rick Fox (5)	TD Waterhouse Centre; 17,248	31–12

February: 8–5 (home: 1–3; road: 7–2)

Game	Date	Team	Score	High points	High rebounds	High assists	Location Attendance	Record
44	February 1	@ Memphis	W 100–85	Shaquille O'Neal (26)	Shaquille O'Neal (10)	Rick Fox (7)	Pyramid Arena; 19,405	32–12
45	February 3	@ Dallas	W 101–94	Shaquille O'Neal (31)	Shaquille O'Neal (13)	Robert Horry (8)	American Airlines Center; 20,179	33–12
46	February 6	Chicago	L 89–97	Kobe Bryant (38)	Samaki Walker (14)	Rick Fox (5)	Staples Center; 18,997	33–13
All-Star Break
47	February 12	Washington	W 103–94	Kobe Bryant (23)	Kobe Bryant (11)	Kobe Bryant (15)	Staples Center; 18,997	34–13
48	February 14	@ Seattle	W 92–87	Kobe Bryant (23)	Fox & George (8)	Kobe Bryant (10)	KeyArena; 17,072	35–13
49	February 15	Atlanta	L 90–93	Kobe Bryant (21)	3 players tied (7)	Kobe Bryant (10)	Staples Center; 18,997	35–14
50	February 17	@ Portland	L 105–111	Kobe Bryant (28)	Robert Horry (8)	Lindsey Hunter (7)	Rose Garden; 20,580	35–15
51	February 19	Boston	L 108–109	Kobe Bryant (27)	Shaquille O'Neal (17)	Lindsey Hunter (9)	Staples Center; 18,997	35–16
52	February 21	@ Cleveland	W 104–97	Kobe Bryant (32)	Bryant & Horry (6)	Kobe Bryant (6)	Gund Arena; 20,562	36–16
53	February 22	@ Charlotte	W 96–94	Shaquille O'Neal (31)	Rick Fox (11)	Kobe Bryant (6)	Charlotte Coliseum; 23,799	37–16
54	February 24	@ New York	W 107–91	Shaquille O'Neal (30)	Shaquille O'Neal (15)	Bryant & O'Neal (5)	Madison Square Garden; 19,763	38–16
55	February 26	@ Milwaukee	W 99–89	Shaquille O'Neal (28)	Shaquille O'Neal (13)	Kobe Bryant (6)	Bradley Center; 18,717	39–16
56	February 27	@ Minnesota	L 101–112	Shaquille O'Neal (27)	Shaquille O'Neal (8)	Kobe Bryant (11)	Target Center; 19,769	39–17

March: 13–4 (home: 11–0; road: 2–4)

Game	Date	Team	Score	High points	High rebounds	High assists	Location Attendance	Record
57	March 1	Indiana	W 96–84	Shaquille O'Neal (33)	Shaquille O'Neal (12)	Robert Horry (6)	Staples Center; 18,897	40–17
58	March 3	Houston	W 95–79	Shaquille O'Neal (36)	Shaquille O'Neal (14)	Shaquille O'Neal (7)	Staples Center; 18,997	41–17
59	March 5	New Jersey	W 101–92	Shaquille O'Neal (40)	Robert Horry (13)	Horry & O'Neal (4)	Staples Center; 18,997	42–17
60	March 6	@ Utah	L 84–92	Shaquille O'Neal (28)	Shaquille O'Neal (12)	Bryant & Hunter (4)	Delta Center; 19,911	42–18
61	March 10	New York	W 117–103	Shaquille O'Neal (40)	Robert Horry (13)	Kobe Bryant (7)	Staples Center; 18,997	43–18
62	March 12	Charlotte	W 107–66	Kobe Bryant (23)	Shaquille O'Neal (10)	Bryant & Richmond (4)	Staples Center; 18,997	44–18
63	March 14	@ Golden State	W 110–102	Shaquille O'Neal (40)	Shaquille O'Neal (13)	Bryant & Fox (6)	The Arena in Oakland; 20,042	45–18
64	March 15	L.A. Clippers	W 98–92	Kobe Bryant (33)	Shaquille O'Neal (13)	Fox & Horry (5)	Staples Center; 18,997	46–18
65	March 17	Dallas	W 105–103	Shaquille O'Neal (28)	Bryant & O'Neal (9)	Kobe Bryant (11)	Staples Center; 18,997	47–18
66	March 19	@ Dallas	L 98–114	Shaquille O'Neal (32)	Shaquille O'Neal (10)	Horry & Richmond (4)	American Airlines Center; 20,112	47–19
67	March 20	@ San Antonio	L 90–108	Kobe Bryant (20)	Shaquille O'Neal (10)	Brian Shaw (5)	Alamodome; 30,775	47–20
68	March 22	Detroit	W 94–82	Shaquille O'Neal (28)	Horry & Walker (10)	Kobe Bryant (7)	Staples Center; 18,997	48–20
69	March 24	@ Sacramento	W 97–96	Kobe Bryant (29)	O'Neal & Shaw (7)	Shaquille O'Neal (6)	ARCO Arena; 17,317	49–20
70	March 26	Cleveland	W 121–116	Shaquille O'Neal (19)	Shaquille O'Neal (8)	Robert Horry (6)	Staples Center; 18,997	50–20
71	March 27	@ Phoenix	L 106–118	Kobe Bryant (36)	Shaquille O'Neal (11)	Robert Horry (6)	America West Arena; 19,023	50–21
72	March 29	Portland	W 91–79	Bryant & O'Neal (34)	Samaki Walker (17)	Kobe Bryant (6)	Staples Center; 18,997	51–21
73	March 31	San Antonio	W 96–95	Kobe Bryant (31)	3 players tied (9)	Robert Horry (4)	Staples Center; 18,997	52–21

April: 6–3 (home: 4–0; road: 2–3)

Game	Date	Team	Score	High points	High rebounds	High assists	Location Attendance	Record
74	April 2	@ Washington	W 113–93	Shaquille O'Neal (22)	Shaquille O'Neal (18)	Kobe Bryant (6)	MCI Center; 20,674	53–21
75	April 3	@ New Jersey	L 92–94	Kobe Bryant (33)	Samaki Walker (14)	Bryant & Shaw (3)	Continental Airlines Arena; 20,049	53–22
76	April 5	@ Boston	L 81–99	Kobe Bryant (26)	Robert Horry (9)	5 players tied (2)	FleetCenter; 18,624	53–23
77	April 7	@ Miami	W 96–88	Shaquille O'Neal (40)	Bryant & O'Neal (11)	Robert Horry (7)	American Airlines Arena; 19,600	54–23
78	April 9	Utah	W 112–82	Bryant & O'Neal (22)	Robert Horry (11)	Kobe Bryant (5)	Staples Center; 18,997	55–23
79	April 11	Minnesota	W 96–83	Shaquille O'Neal (32)	Samaki Walker (10)	Derek Fisher (4)	Staples Center; 18,997	56–23
80	April 14	@ Portland	L 120–128 (2OT)	Shaquille O'Neal (36)	Shaquille O'Neal (11)	Kobe Bryant (9)	Rose Garden; 20,580	56–24
81	April 15	Seattle	W 111–104	Shaquille O'Neal (41)	Shaquille O'Neal (11)	Brian Shaw (6)	Staples Center; 18,997	57–24
82	April 17	Sacramento	W 109–95	Bryant & O'Neal (21)	Samaki Walker (15)	Kobe Bryant (5)	Staples Center; 18,997	58–24

2001–02 season schedule

=== Playoffs ===
2001–02 game log
Total: 15–4 (Home: 8–2; Road: 7–2)
First round: 3–0 (home: 2–0; road: 1–0)

Game	Date	Team	Score	High points	High rebounds	High assists	Location Attendance	Series
1	April 21	Portland	W 95–87	Kobe Bryant (34)	Shaquille O'Neal (9)	Rick Fox (6)	Staples Center; 18,997	1–0
2	April 25	Portland	W 103–96	Shaquille O'Neal (31)	Shaquille O'Neal (14)	Kobe Bryant (5)	Staples Center; 18,997	2–0
3	April 28	@ Portland	W 92–91	Kobe Bryant (25)	Shaquille O'Neal (11)	Bryant & O'Neal (7)	Rose Garden; 20,580	3–0

Conference Semi-finals: 4–1 (home: 2–1; road: 2–0)

Game	Date	Team	Score	High points	High rebounds	High assists	Location Attendance	Series
1	May 5	San Antonio	W 86–80	Shaquille O'Neal (23)	Shaquille O'Neal (17)	3 players tied (4)	Staples Center; 18,997	1–0
2	May 7	San Antonio	L 85–88	Kobe Bryant (26)	Robert Horry (11)	Kobe Bryant (6)	Staples Center; 18,997	1–1
3	May 10	@ San Antonio	W 99–89	Kobe Bryant (31)	Shaquille O'Neal (15)	Kobe Bryant (6)	Alamodome; 35,520	2–1
4	May 12	@ San Antonio	W 87–85	Kobe Bryant (28)	Shaquille O'Neal (11)	Shaquille O'Neal (5)	Alamodome; 32,342	3–1
5	May 14	San Antonio	W 93–87	Kobe Bryant (26)	Shaquille O'Neal (11)	Rick Fox (7)	Staples Center; 18,997	4–1

Conference Finals: 4–3 (home: 2–1; road: 2–2)

Game	Date	Team	Score	High points	High rebounds	High assists	Location Attendance	Series
1	May 18	@ Sacramento	W 106–99	Kobe Bryant (30)	Shaquille O'Neal (9)	3 players tied (5)	ARCO Arena; 17,317	1–0
2	May 20	@ Sacramento	L 90–96	Shaquille O'Neal (35)	Robert Horry (20)	Fisher & Horry (4)	ARCO Arena; 17,317	1–1
3	May 24	Sacramento	L 90–103	Kobe Bryant (22)	Shaquille O'Neal (19)	Brian Shaw (7)	Staples Center; 18,997	1–2
4	May 26	Sacramento	W 100–99	Shaquille O'Neal (27)	Shaquille O'Neal (18)	Robert Horry (5)	Staples Center; 18,997	2–2
5	May 28	@ Sacramento	L 91–92	Kobe Bryant (30)	Robert Horry (11)	3 players tied (3)	ARCO Arena; 17,317	2–3
6	May 31	Sacramento	W 106–102	Shaquille O'Neal (41)	Shaquille O'Neal (17)	Bryant & Horry (5)	Staples Center; 18,997	3–3
7	June 2	@ Sacramento	W 112–106 (OT)	Shaquille O'Neal (35)	Rick Fox (14)	Bryant & Fox (7)	ARCO Arena; 17,317	4–3

NBA Finals: 4–0 (home: 2–0; road: 2–0)

Game	Date	Team	Score	High points	High rebounds	High assists	Location Attendance	Series
1	June 5	New Jersey	W 99–94	Shaquille O'Neal (36)	Shaquille O'Neal (16)	Kobe Bryant (6)	Staples Center; 18,997	1–0
2	June 7	New Jersey	W 106–83	Shaquille O'Neal (40)	Shaquille O'Neal (12)	Shaquille O'Neal (8)	Staples Center; 18,997	2–0
3	June 9	@ New Jersey	W 106–103	Kobe Bryant (36)	Shaquille O'Neal (11)	Derek Fisher (6)	Continental Airlines Arena; 19,215	3–0
4	June 12	@ New Jersey	W 113–107	Shaquille O'Neal (34)	Shaquille O'Neal (10)	Kobe Bryant (8)	Continental Airlines Arena; 19,296	4–0

2002 schedule

== NBA Finals ==
=== Summary ===
The following scoring summary is written in a line score format, except that the quarter numbers are replaced by game numbers.

Team	Game 1	Game 2	Game 3	Game 4	Wins
Los Angeles (West)	99	106	106	113	4
New Jersey (East)	94	83	103	107	0

=== Aspects ===
Amid tensions between co-captains Shaquille O'Neal and Kobe Bryant, the franchise had another stellar season, finishing 58–24 (.707), good for second in the Pacific Division and earning the third seed in the Western Conference. Bryant and O'Neal were voted starters in the 2002 NBA All-Star Game, where Bryant won the game MVP trophy in his hometown Philadelphia. The duo appeared on the All-NBA First Team and Bryant was honored with an NBA All-Defensive Second Team selection.

Entering the 2001–02 season, the New Jersey Nets were enduring a three-year playoff drought and had a 73–141 record over that span. In 1999, the Nets hired Rod Thorn as team president and immediately, he hired the recently retired Byron Scott to coach New Jersey. Thorn then dealt for Stephon Marbury in a three-team trade with the Milwaukee Bucks and Minnesota Timberwolves, trading Sam Cassell away to the Bucks. Due to the Nets' 31–51 season in 1999–00 season, they had the first overall pick in the 2000 NBA draft, which they used to select power forward Kenyon Martin out of the University of Cincinnati. Despite the reshuffling of the roster and a Rookie of the Year season for Martin, New Jersey struggled, ending the season with a 26–56 (.317) record, and were bestowed the 7th pick in the upcoming draft.

With another lottery pick, Thorn dealt it to the Houston Rockets for draftees Richard Jefferson, Jason Collins and Brandon Armstrong. The next day, Phoenix Suns owner Jerry Colangelo announced a franchise-shaking trade; Phoenix would swap their point guard Jason Kidd for his New Jersey counterpart Stephon Marbury.

With the Princeton offense installed from the coaching staff, the Nets rebounded to a 52–30 (.634) mark, a twenty-six-win improvement from the last season, and clinched the number-one seed in the Eastern Conference. Kidd finished the season awarded with first team spots on both the All-NBA and All-Defensive Teams and was selected for his fifth All-Star game. He also finished runner-up to San Antonio Spurs power forward Tim Duncan in the Most Valuable Player voting. Richard Jefferson was an All-Rookie second team selection and Thorn, the architect of the franchise's resurgence, was awarded NBA Executive of the Year.

=== Game One ===
Wednesday, June 5, 2002, 6:00 at the Staples Center.

Los Angeles's Staples Center sold out for the inaugural game of the 2002 NBA Finals, with nearly 19,000 on hand. The Nets trotted out a lineup of Kidd, Kittles, Martin, Van Horn and MacCulloth to hold up against the two-time defending and heavily favored champions. The Lakers brought out Derek Fisher, Rick Fox, Shaquille O'Neal, Robert Horry, and Kobe Bryant, who drew the assignment of guarding Kidd. New Jersey head coach Byron Scott, a member of the Showtime Lakers, received a standing ovation.

Taking advantage of a late arrival to the arena by New Jersey, L.A. dominated the first 17 minutes of play with a 42–19 score by the 6:41 mark in the second quarter. From that point on, the Nets went on a 17–6 to close the lead to a respectable 12. They had no answer for O'Neal, however, who had bullied MacCulloth into 16 points and 6 rebounds by half-time. The Nets outscored the Lakers in the third but stood steadfast as Bryant scored 11 of his 22 in the third.

" You can't dig yourself a hole, get down by 19 or 20 points and expect to win. We just dug ourselves a hole against the champions. "

— Lucious Harris, Sports Illustrated

New Jersey battled back, coming as close as three several times in the final quarter. Desperate to take the lead, they utilized the "Hack-a-Shaq" strategy midway in the fourth. It backfired, as O'Neal was 5–8 from the free throw line and had 16 points and 9 rebounds in the period alone.

New Jersey was doomed by their late start and poor shooting. The Nets, who shot 45% from the field and 74% on free throws were 39% and 57% respectively. Kidd finished with a triple–double, the 26th in Finals history and the first since Charles Barkley's in the 1993 series.

Recap

Team	1st Qt.	2nd Qt.	3rd Qt.	4th Qt.	Total
New Jersey	14	22	27	31	94
Los Angeles	29	19	24	27	99

=== Game Two ===
Friday, June 7, 2002, 6:00 at the Staples Center.

The second game was more of statement as the Lakers clobbered the Nets by a score of 106-83 thanks to Shaquille O'Neal's 40 points, 12 rebounds, and 8 assists.

Recap

Team	1st Qt.	2nd Qt.	3rd Qt.	4th Qt.	Total
New Jersey	21	22	18	22	83
Los Angeles	27	22	28	29	106

=== Game Three ===
Sunday, June 9, 2002, 8:30 at the Continental Airlines Arena.

Game Three would prove to a hard-fought game (much like the first game of the series) as the Lakers and Nets would trade leads throughout the game but thanks to Kobe Bryant's 36 points, 6 rebounds, 4 assists and 2 blocks the Lakers prevail by a score of 106–103 to take a commanding 3–0 series lead.

Recap

Team	1st Qt.	2nd Qt.	3rd Qt.	4th Qt.	Total
Los Angeles	31	21	26	28	106
New Jersey	23	23	32	25	103

=== Game Four ===
Wednesday, June 12, 2002, 9:00 at the Continental Airlines Arena.

Despite this being a hard-fought battle (much like the previous game and as well as the first game of the series) the Lakers still won game four and the championship, giving Phil Jackson his Red Auerbach-tying ninth title and the Lakers their third consecutive title (and fourteenth overall) making them the fifth team to win three consecutive titles and denying the Nets their first ever championship since the franchise moved to East Rutherford.

Recap

Team	1st Qt.	2nd Qt.	3rd Qt.	4th Qt.	Total
Los Angeles	27	31	26	29	113
New Jersey	34	23	23	27	107

== Player statistics ==
Legend
GP	Games played	GS	Games started	MPG	Minutes per game
FG%	Field-goal percentage	3P%	3-point field-goal percentage	FT%	Free-throw percentage
RPG	Rebounds per game	APG	Assists per game	SPG	Steals per game
BPG	Blocks per game	PPG	Points per game

=== Season ===
Player	GP	GS	MPG	FG%	3P%	FT%	RPG	APG	SPG	BPG	PPG
Kobe Bryant	80	80	38.3	.469	.250	.829	5.5	5.5	1.48	.44	25.2
Derek Fisher	70	35	28.2	.411	.413	.847	2.1	2.6	.94	.13	11.2
Rick Fox	82	82	27.9	.421	.313	.824	4.7	3.5	.82	.26	7.9
Devean George	82	1	21.5	.411	.371	.675	3.7	1.4	.87	.51	7.1
Robert Horry	81	23	26.4	.398	.374	.783	5.9	2.9	.95	1.10	6.8
Lindsey Hunter	82	47	19.7	.382	.380	.500	1.5	1.6	.80	.23	5.8
Mark Madsen	59	5	11.0	.452	.000	.648	2.7	.7	.27	.22	2.8
Jelani McCoy	21	0	5.0	.571	.000	.250	1.2	.3	.00	.24	1.2
Slava Medvedenko	71	6	10.3	.477	.000	.661	2.2	.6	.41	.15	4.7
Shaquille O'Neal	67	66	36.1	.579	.000	.555	10.7	3.0	.61	2.04	27.2
Mike Penberthy	3	0	4.0	.500	.000	.750	.7	.7	.67	.00	1.7
Mitch Richmond	64	2	11.1	.405	.290	.955	1.5	.9	.28	.09	4.1
Brian Shaw	58	0	10.9	.353	.330	.692	1.9	1.5	.43	.05	2.9
Samaki Walker	69	63	24.0	.512	.000	.667	7.0	.9	.41	1.28	6.7

=== Playoffs ===
Player	GP	GS	MPG	FG%	3P%	FT%	RPG	APG	SPG	BPG	PPG
Kobe Bryant	19	19	43.8	.434	.379	.759	5.8	4.6	1.42	.89	26.6
Derek Fisher	19	19	34.2	.357	.358	.786	3.3	2.7	1.00	.05	10.2
Rick Fox	19	19	34.3	.482	.349	.755	5.4	3.4	1.11	.32	9.8
Devean George	19	0	17.2	.365	.229	.733	3.6	.6	.58	.53	5.0
Robert Horry	19	14	37.0	.449	.387	.789	8.1	3.2	1.74	.84	9.3
Lindsey Hunter	18	0	7.3	.311	.276	.000	.4	.6	.11	.00	2.0
Mark Madsen	7	0	1.4	.000	.000	.000	.3	.0	.00	.00	.0
Slava Medvedenko	7	0	3.0	.600	.000	.000	.6	.0	.00	.00	.9
Shaquille O'Neal	19	19	40.8	.529	.000	.649	12.6	2.8	.53	2.53	28.5
Mitch Richmond	2	0	2.0	1.000	.000	.500	.5	.0	.00	.00	1.5
Brian Shaw	19	0	12.5	.333	.281	1.000	1.8	1.6	.26	.32	2.9
Samaki Walker	19	5	12.6	.462	1.000	.765	4.1	.2	.11	.32	3.3

Player statistics citation:

== Award winners ==
- Shaquille O'Neal, NBA Finals Most Valuable Player
- Shaquille O'Neal, All-NBA First Team
- Shaquille O'Neal, League Leader, FG%, 57.9
- Kobe Bryant, All-NBA First Team
- Kobe Bryant, NBA All-Defensive Second Team
- Kobe Bryant, NBA All-Star Game Most Valuable Player Award

== Legacy ==
- By winning the third straight Finals MVP, Shaquille O'Neal became only the second player to achieve this feat, after Michael Jordan doing it twice in 1991-93 and 1996–98.
