= 2001–02 Denver Nuggets season =

NBA professional basketball team season

- Head coach: Dan Issel (resigned); Mike Evans
- General manager: Kiki VanDeWeghe
- Owner: Stan Kroenke
- Arena: Pepsi Center

Results
- Record: 27–55 (.329)
- Place: Division: 6th (Midwest); Conference: 12th (Western)
- Playoff finish: Did not qualify
- Stats at Basketball Reference

Local media
- Television: KTVD; Fox Sports Net Rocky Mountain
- Radio: KKFN

The 2001–02 Denver Nuggets season was the 26th season for the Denver Nuggets in the National Basketball Association, and their 35th season as a franchise.

== Season summary ==
=== Off-season ===
During the off-season, the Nuggets signed free agents Isaiah Rider and Avery Johnson; however, Rider only played in just ten games before being waived in November. After finishing just one game below .500 in winning percentage the previous season, the Nuggets suffered another disastrous setback as Antonio McDyess suffered a preseason knee injury; he would only appear in just ten games this season.

=== Regular season ===
With the addition of Johnson, the Nuggets got off to a 6–5 start to the regular season, but then lost nine of their next ten games. One notable incident of the regular season occurred, after a 99–96 home loss to the Charlotte Hornets at the Pepsi Center on December 11, 2001. Head coach Dan Issel yelled a racial slur towards a Mexican fan; Issel was suspended for four games and was forced to resign, being replaced by assistant coach Mike Evans after a 9–17 start to the season. At mid-season, the Nuggets traded Johnson, Nick Van Exel, Raef LaFrentz and Tariq Abdul-Wahad to the Dallas Mavericks in exchange for Juwan Howard, former All-Star guard Tim Hardaway, and second-year forward Donnell Harvey. The team posted a 7-game losing streak in March, and finished in sixth place in the Midwest Division with a 27–55 record, missing the NBA playoffs for the seventh consecutive year.

Howard averaged 17.9 points and 7.9 rebounds per game in 28 games after the trade, while Voshon Lenard averaged 11.5 points per game, and McDyess provided the team with 11.3 points and 5.5 rebounds per game. In addition, Hardaway contributed 9.6 points and 5.5 assists per game in 14 games, while George McCloud provided with 8.8 points per game, and Harvey averaged 8.0 points and 6.2 rebounds per game in 29 games. Meanwhile, Calbert Cheaney contributed 7.3 points per game, and Ryan Bowen averaged 4.9 points and 4.0 rebounds per game.

The Nuggets finished 20th in the NBA in home-game attendance, with an attendance of 633,846 at the Pepsi Center during the regular season.

=== Aftermath ===
Following the season, McDyess was traded to the New York Knicks on draft day, after six seasons and two separate stints with the Nuggets, while Lenard signed as a free agent with the Toronto Raptors, and Cheaney signed with the Utah Jazz. Meanwhile, McCloud was traded to the Washington Wizards, but was released to free agency, Hardaway was released, and Evans was fired as head coach.

== Offseason ==
=== Draft picks ===
Round	Pick	Player	Position	Nationality	School/Club team
2	47	Ousmane Cisse	F	Mali	St. Jude HS (AL)

== Roster ==
2001–02 Denver Nuggets roster
Players

Pos.	No.	Player	Height	Weight	DOB	From
C	27	Mengke Bateer	6 ft 11 in (2.11 m)	290 lb (132 kg)		China
F	15	Chris Andersen	6 ft 10 in (2.08 m)	230 lb (104 kg)		Blinn
G	30	Carlos Arroyo	6 ft 2 in (1.88 m)	202 lb (92 kg)		FIU
F	32	Ryan Bowen	6 ft 7 in (2.01 m)	215 lb (98 kg)		Iowa
G/F	29	Calbert Cheaney	6 ft 7 in (2.01 m)	209 lb (95 kg)		Indiana
C	25	Zendon Hamilton	6 ft 11 in (2.11 m)	250 lb (113 kg)		St. John's
G	10	Tim Hardaway (injured)	6 ft 0 in (1.83 m)	175 lb (79 kg)		UTEP
F	1	Donnell Harvey	6 ft 8 in (2.03 m)	220 lb (100 kg)		Florida
F	7	Juwan Howard	6 ft 9 in (2.06 m)	240 lb (109 kg)		Michigan
G	5	Voshon Lenard	6 ft 4 in (1.93 m)	205 lb (93 kg)		Minnesota
F	21	George McCloud	6 ft 6 in (1.98 m)	205 lb (93 kg)		Florida State
F/C	24	Antonio McDyess (injured)	6 ft 9 in (2.06 m)	220 lb (100 kg)		Alabama
G/F	41	James Posey	6 ft 8 in (2.03 m)	215 lb (98 kg)		Xavier
G	11	Kenny Satterfield	6 ft 2 in (1.88 m)	186 lb (84 kg)		Cincinnati
F/C	42	Scott Williams (injured)	6 ft 10 in (2.08 m)	230 lb (104 kg)		North Carolina

Coaches
Head coach
- Mike Evans
Assistant(s)
- Louie Dampier
- Clyde Drexler
- Kim Hughes
- John MacLeod (associate head coach)

Legend
- (DP) Unsigned draft pick
- (FA) Free agent
- (S) Suspended
- Injured

Roster

=== Roster notes ===
- Shooting guard Isaiah Rider was waived on November 20, 2001.

== Regular season ==
=== Season standings ===
Midwest Division	W	L	PCT	GB	Home	Road	Div
y-San Antonio Spurs	58	24	.707	–	32–9	26–15	21–3
x-Dallas Mavericks	57	25	.695	1	30–11	27–14	16–8
x-Minnesota Timberwolves	50	32	.610	8	29–12	21–20	15–9
x-Utah Jazz	44	38	.537	14	25–16	19–22	8–16
e-Houston Rockets	28	54	.341	30	18–23	10–31	9–15
e-Denver Nuggets	27	55	.329	31	20–21	7–34	8–16
e-Memphis Grizzlies	23	59	.280	35	15–26	8–33	7–17

#	Western Conference				
#	Team	W	L	PCT	GB
1	z-Sacramento Kings	61	21	.744	–
2	y-San Antonio Spurs	58	24	.707	3
3	x-Los Angeles Lakers	58	24	.707	3
4	x-Dallas Mavericks	57	25	.695	4
5	x-Minnesota Timberwolves	50	32	.610	11
6	x-Portland Trail Blazers	49	33	.598	12
7	x-Seattle SuperSonics	45	37	.549	16
8	x-Utah Jazz	44	38	.537	17
9	e-Los Angeles Clippers	39	43	.476	22
10	e-Phoenix Suns	36	46	.439	25
11	e-Houston Rockets	28	54	.341	33
12	e-Denver Nuggets	27	55	.329	34
13	e-Memphis Grizzlies	23	59	.280	38
14	e-Golden State Warriors	21	61	.256	40

z - clinched division title
y - clinched division title
x - clinched playoff spot

== Player statistics ==
Legend
GP	Games played	GS	Games started	MPG	Minutes per game
FG%	Field-goal percentage	3P%	3-point field-goal percentage	FT%	Free-throw percentage
RPG	Rebounds per game	APG	Assists per game	SPG	Steals per game
BPG	Blocks per game	PPG	Points per game

=== Regular season ===
Player	GP	GS	MPG	FG%	3FG%	FT%	RPG	APG	SPG	BPG	PPG
Nick Van Exel	45	44	38.6	.408	.337	.782	3.8	8.1	0.7	0.2	21.4
Juwan Howard	28	28	34.9	.457	.000	.770	7.9	2.7	0.6	0.6	17.9
Raef LaFrentz	51	51	32.7	.466	.434	.667	7.4	1.2	0.6	3.0	14.9
Voshon Lenard	71	19	23.5	.410	.371	.783	2.6	1.8	0.8	0.4	11.5
Antonio McDyess	10	10	23.6	.573		.818	5.5	1.8	1.0	0.8	11.3
James Posey	73	63	30.7	.376	.283	.793	5.9	2.5	1.6	0.5	10.7
Tim Hardaway	14	14	23.2	.373	.373	.632	1.9	5.5	1.2	0.1	9.6
Avery Johnson	51	13	23.5	.486	.000	.747	1.3	5.1	0.7	0.2	9.4
Isaiah Rider	10	1	17.3	.457	.400	.765	3.3	1.2	0.3	0.2	9.3
George McCloud	69	26	26.5	.358	.270	.810	3.6	3.0	0.8	0.3	8.8
Donnell Harvey	29	4	23.4	.492		.647	6.2	1.1	0.6	0.7	8.0
Calbert Cheaney	68	47	24.0	.481	.000	.687	3.5	1.6	0.5	0.3	7.3
Tariq Abdul-Wahad	20	12	20.9	.379	.500	.750	3.9	1.1	0.9	0.5	6.8
Zendon Hamilton	54	15	15.7	.420		.652	4.7	0.3	0.4	0.3	6.0
Kenny Satterfield	36	4	15.6	.367	.259	.783	1.4	3.0	0.9	0.0	5.3
Mengke Bateer	27	10	15.1	.402	.333	.784	3.6	0.8	0.4	0.2	5.1
Ryan Bowen	75	21	22.5	.479	.083	.750	4.0	0.7	1.0	0.5	4.9
Scott Williams	41	16	18.0	.396	.000	.732	5.1	0.3	0.4	0.8	4.9
Carlos Arroyo	20	1	13.8	.439	.000	.750	1.4	2.5	0.3	0.1	4.1
Shawnelle Scott	21	10	12.0	.493		.400	4.9	0.4	0.1	0.3	3.9
Chris Andersen	24	1	10.9	.338	.000	.786	3.2	0.3	0.3	1.2	3.0

Player statistics citation:

== See also ==
- 2001-02 NBA season
