= 2001–02 Houston Rockets season =

- Head coach: Rudy Tomjanovich
- General manager: Carroll Dawson
- Owner: Leslie Alexander
- Arena: Compaq Center

Results
- Record: 28–54 (.341)
- Place: Division: 5th (Midwest); Conference: 11th (Western)
- Playoff finish: Did not qualify
- Stats at Basketball Reference

Local media
- Television: KTBU; Fox Sports Net Southwest
- Radio: KTRH

The 2001–02 Houston Rockets season was the 35th season for the Houston Rockets in the National Basketball Association, and their 31st season in Houston, Texas.

== Season summary ==
=== Off-season ===
The Rockets received the 13th overall pick in the 2001 NBA draft, and selected small forward Richard Jefferson from the University of Arizona; the team also selected center Jason Collins out of Stanford University with the 18th overall pick, and selected shooting guard Brandon Armstrong out of Pepperdine University with the 23rd overall pick. However, the Rockets soon traded all three players to the New Jersey Nets in exchange for rookie power forward, and first-round draft pick Eddie Griffin out of Seton Hall University on draft day. During the off-season, the team acquired All-Star forward Glen Rice from the New York Knicks, and re-acquired former Rockets forward Kevin Willis from the Milwaukee Bucks.

=== Regular season ===
With the addition of Rice, Griffin and Willis, and in their first season since 1983–84 without All-Star center Hakeem Olajuwon, the Rockets got off to a 7–5 start to the regular season. However, the team suffered a dreadful 15-game losing streak afterwards, as Rice only played just 20 games due to a knee injury, and Maurice Taylor was out for the entire season due to a ruptured Achilles tendon. Due to injuries that hindered their roster for parts of the year, the Rockets played mediocre basketball all season long, losing 15 of their final 18 games, and finishing in fifth place in the Midwest Division with a disappointing 28–54 record.

Team captain Steve Francis averaged 21.6 points, 7.0 rebounds and 6.4 assists per game, but only played 57 games due to recurring foot injuries and migraines, while Cuttino Mobley led the Rockets with 21.7 points and 1.5 steals per game, and with 149 three-point field goals, and Kenny Thomas provided the team with 14.1 points and 7.2 rebounds per game. In addition, Walt Williams contributed 9.4 points per game, while Griffin averaged 8.8 points, 5.7 rebounds and 1.8 blocks per game, and was named to the NBA All-Rookie Second Team. Meanwhile, Rice contributed 8.6 points per game, Moochie Norris provided with 8.1 points and 4.9 assists per game, Kelvin Cato averaged 6.6 points, 7.0 rebounds and 1.3 blocks per game, and Willis averaged 6.1 points and 5.8 rebounds per game.

During the NBA All-Star weekend at the First Union Center in Philadelphia, Pennsylvania, Francis was selected for the 2002 NBA All-Star Game, as a member of the Western Conference All-Star team; it was his first ever All-Star appearance. In addition, Francis also participated in the NBA Slam Dunk Contest for the second time. The Rockets finished 28th in the NBA in home-game attendance, with an attendance of 481,227 at the Compaq Center during the regular season, which was the second-lowest in the league.

=== Aftermath ===
Following the season, Williams signed as a free agent with the Dallas Mavericks, and Willis signed with the San Antonio Spurs.

== Offseason ==
=== Draft picks ===
Round	Pick	Player	Position	Nationality	College
1	13	Richard Jefferson	SF	United States	Arizona
1	18	Jason Collins	C	United States	Stanford
1	23	Brandon Armstrong	SG	United States	Pepperdine

== Roster ==
2001–02 Houston Rockets roster
Players

Pos.	No.	Player	Height	Weight	DOB	From
G	10	Tierre Brown	6 ft 2 in (1.88 m)	189 lb (86 kg)		McNeese State
F/C	13	Kelvin Cato	6 ft 11 in (2.11 m)	255 lb (116 kg)		Iowa State
C	52	Jason Collier	7 ft 0 in (2.13 m)	260 lb (118 kg)		Georgia Tech
G	3	Steve Francis	6 ft 3 in (1.91 m)	195 lb (88 kg)		Maryland
F/C	33	Eddie Griffin	6 ft 10 in (2.08 m)	220 lb (100 kg)		Seton Hall
F	14	Dan Langhi	6 ft 11 in (2.11 m)	220 lb (100 kg)		Vanderbilt
G/F	5	Cuttino Mobley	6 ft 4 in (1.93 m)	190 lb (86 kg)		Rhode Island
F	44	Terence Morris	6 ft 9 in (2.06 m)	221 lb (100 kg)		Maryland
G	12	Moochie Norris	6 ft 1 in (1.85 m)	175 lb (79 kg)		West Florida
F	41	Glen Rice (injured)	6 ft 7 in (2.01 m)	215 lb (98 kg)		Michigan
F	21	Kenny Thomas	6 ft 7 in (2.01 m)	261 lb (118 kg)		New Mexico
G/F	18	Óscar Torres	6 ft 8 in (2.03 m)	215 lb (98 kg)		Xavier
F/C	2	Maurice Taylor (injured) (IN)	6 ft 9 in (2.06 m)	260 lb (118 kg)		Michigan
F	42	Walt Williams (injured)	6 ft 8 in (2.03 m)	219 lb (99 kg)		Maryland
F/C	43	Kevin Willis	7 ft 0 in (2.13 m)	245 lb (111 kg)		Michigan State

Coaches
Head coach
- Rudy Tomjanovich
Assistant(s)
- Jim Boylen
- Larry Smith
- Mike Wells

Legend
- (DP) Unsigned draft pick
- (FA) Free agent
- (S) Suspended
- (IN) Inactive
- Injured

Roster

=== Roster notes ===
- Power forward Maurice Taylor was on the injured reserve list due to a ruptured Achilles tendon, and missed the entire regular season.

== Regular season ==
=== Season standings ===
Midwest Division	W	L	PCT	GB	Home	Road	Div
y-San Antonio Spurs	58	24	.707	–	32–9	26–15	21–3
x-Dallas Mavericks	57	25	.695	1	30–11	27–14	16–8
x-Minnesota Timberwolves	50	32	.610	8	29–12	21–20	15–9
x-Utah Jazz	44	38	.537	14	25–16	19–22	8–16
e-Houston Rockets	28	54	.341	30	18–23	10–31	9–15
e-Denver Nuggets	27	55	.329	31	20–21	7–34	8–16
e-Memphis Grizzlies	23	59	.280	35	15–26	8–33	7–17

#	Western Conference				
#	Team	W	L	PCT	GB
1	z-Sacramento Kings	61	21	.744	–
2	y-San Antonio Spurs	58	24	.707	3
3	x-Los Angeles Lakers	58	24	.707	3
4	x-Dallas Mavericks	57	25	.695	4
5	x-Minnesota Timberwolves	50	32	.610	11
6	x-Portland Trail Blazers	49	33	.598	12
7	x-Seattle SuperSonics	45	37	.549	16
8	x-Utah Jazz	44	38	.537	17
9	e-Los Angeles Clippers	39	43	.476	22
10	e-Phoenix Suns	36	46	.439	25
11	e-Houston Rockets	28	54	.341	33
12	e-Denver Nuggets	27	55	.329	34
13	e-Memphis Grizzlies	23	59	.280	38
14	e-Golden State Warriors	21	61	.256	40

== Player statistics ==
Legend
GP	Games played	GS	Games started	MPG	Minutes per game
FG%	Field-goal percentage	3P%	3-point field-goal percentage	FT%	Free-throw percentage
RPG	Rebounds per game	APG	Assists per game	SPG	Steals per game
BPG	Blocks per game	PPG	Points per game

=== Season ===
Player	GP	GS	MPG	FG%	3FG%	FT%	RPG	APG	SPG	BPG	PPG
Tierre Brown	40	1	10.1	.426	.333	.750	1.1	1.8	.5	.1	3.1
Kelvin Cato	75	73	25.6	.583	.000	.582	7.0	.4	.5	1.3	6.6
Jason Collier	25	2	14.6	.432	.000	.750	3.3	.4	.2	.2	4.2
Steve Francis	57	56	41.1	.417	.324	.773	7.0	6.4	1.2	.4	21.6
Eddie Griffin	73	24	26.0	.366	.330	.744	5.7	.7	.2	1.8	8.8
Dan Langhi	34	8	12.8	.392	.250	.727	2.0	.4	.2	.1	3.1
Cuttino Mobley	74	74	42.1	.438	.395	.850	4.1	2.5	1.5	.5	21.7
Terence Morris	68	12	16.3	.384	.192	.643	3.1	.9	.3	.4	3.8
Moochie Norris	82	26	27.4	.398	.269	.751	3.0	4.9	1.0	.0	8.1
Glen Rice	20	20	30.3	.389	.281	.800	2.4	1.6	.6	.2	8.6
Kenny Thomas	72	71	34.5	.478	.000	.664	7.2	1.9	1.2	.9	14.1
Óscar Torres	65	13	16.5	.396	.294	.781	1.9	.6	.4	.1	6.0
Walt Williams	48	25	23.3	.419	.426	.784	3.4	1.4	.4	.2	9.4
Kevin Willis	52	5	16.6	.440	.000	.747	5.8	.3	.5	.4	6.1

Player statistics citation:

== Awards and records ==
- Eddie Griffin, NBA All-Rookie Team 2nd Team
