= 2001–02 Seattle SuperSonics season =

NBA professional basketball team season

- Head coach: Nate McMillan
- General manager: Rick Sund
- Owners: Howard Schultz
- Arena: KeyArena

Results
- Record: 45–37 (.549)
- Place: Division: 4th (Pacific); Conference: 7th (Western)
- Playoff finish: West First Round (lost to Spurs 2–3)
- Stats at Basketball Reference

Local media
- Television: KING-TV; KONG; Fox Sports Net Northwest
- Radio: KJR

The 2001–02 Seattle SuperSonics season was the 35th season for the Seattle SuperSonics in the National Basketball Association.

== Season summary ==
=== Off-season ===
The SuperSonics received the twelfth overall pick in the 2001 NBA draft, and selected Yugoslavian power forward Vladimir Radmanovic; the team also selected point guard Earl Watson from the University of California, Los Angeles with the 39th overall pick. During the off-season, the SuperSonics signed free agents Calvin Booth, and Jerome James.

For the season, the SuperSonics redesigned their primary logo, replacing the colors dark green and dark red with their traditional color scheme of emerald green, golden yellow and white. The team's primary logo featured a green background with a golden yellow inline, featuring the city name "Seattle" in white letters, and the team nickname "Sonics" in golden yellow letters with green inlines. Underneath the city and team names featured a green circle with a golden yellow inline, featuring a white letter "S" in front of a golden yellow basketball with green seams.

The team also redesigned their home and road uniforms, which featured a V-shaped collar. The uniforms also featured a golden yellow and black trim, a stripe across the front of their jerseys which also served as side panels on their jerseys and shorts, and their new alternate logo of a white letter "S" in front of a golden yellow basketball on both sides of their shorts. The white home uniforms featured the team nickname "Sonics" in white letters with golden yellow inlines on the green stripe across the front of their jerseys, which served as green side panels with golden yellow and black outlines. The road uniforms were changed from dark green to emerald green, and featured the city name "Seattle" in green letters with golden yellow inlines on the white stripe, which served as white side panels with black and golden yellow outlines.

The team's new primary logo, and new uniforms would both remain in use until 2008; although the uniforms would be slightly updated in 2006, where they would add the jersey numbers to the left leg of their shorts.

=== Regular season ===
Under Nate McMillan's first full season as head coach, the SuperSonics struggled losing five of their first seven games, and held a 9–14 start to the regular season. However, the team won 14 of their next 20 games, and played above .500 in winning percentage for the remainder of the season, holding a 25–23 record at the All-Star break. Despite losing six of their final eight games of the season, the SuperSonics finished in fourth place in the Pacific Division with a 45–37 record, which was only a one-game improvement over the previous season, earning the seventh seed in the Western Conference, and returning to the NBA playoffs after a one-year absence.

Gary Payton averaged 22.1 points, 9.0 assists and 1.6 steals per game, and was named to the All-NBA Second Team, and to the NBA All-Defensive First Team. In addition, Rashard Lewis averaged 16.8 points, 7.0 rebounds and 1.5 steals per game, along with 123 three-point field goals, while Brent Barry provided the team with 14.4 points, 5.4 rebounds, 5.3 assists and 1.8 steals per game, and also led them with 164 three-point field goals, Vin Baker contributed 14.1 points and 6.4 rebounds per game, but only played 55 games due to a shoulder injury, and second-year forward Desmond Mason provided with 12.4 points and 4.7 rebounds per game. Meanwhile, Radmanovic averaged 6.7 points and 3.8 rebounds per game, and was named to the NBA All-Rookie Second Team, rookie center Predrag Drobnjak provided with 6.8 points and 3.4 rebounds per game, James contributed 5.3 points, 4.1 rebounds and 1.5 blocks per game, and Watson contributed 3.6 points and 2.0 assists per game.

During the NBA All-Star weekend at the First Union Center in Philadelphia, Pennsylvania, Payton was selected for the 2002 NBA All-Star Game, as a member of the Western Conference All-Star team. Meanwhile, Mason participated in the NBA Slam Dunk Contest for the second consecutive year, and was also selected for the NBA Rookie Challenge Game, as a member of the Sophomores team. Payton also finished in sixth place in Most Valuable Player voting, while Barry finished in fifth place in Most Improved Player voting, with Payton and Mason both finishing tied in twelfth place; Mason also finished tied in fifth place in Sixth Man of the Year voting, and McMillan finished in fourth place in Coach of the Year voting.

The SuperSonics finished 21st in the NBA in home-game attendance, with an attendance of 633,516 at the KeyArena at Seattle Center during the regular season.

=== NBA playoffs ===
In the Western Conference First Round of the 2002 NBA playoffs, the SuperSonics faced off against the 2nd–seeded, and Midwest Division champion San Antonio Spurs, who were led by All-Star forward, and Most Valuable Player of the Year, Tim Duncan, All-Star center David Robinson, and rookie point guard Tony Parker. The SuperSonics lost Game 1 to the Spurs on the road, 110–89 at the Alamodome, but managed to win Game 2 on the road, 98–90. The SuperSonics lost Game 3 at home, 102–75 at the KeyArena at Seattle Center, but managed to win Game 4 over the Spurs at home, 91–79 to even the series at 2–2. However, the SuperSonics lost Game 5 to the Spurs at the Alamodome, 101–78, thus losing in a hard-fought five-game series.

=== Aftermath ===
This was also Payton's final full season with the SuperSonics, as he would be traded to the Milwaukee Bucks midway through the following season. Meanwhile, Baker and Shammond Williams were both traded to the Boston Celtics, after Baker spent five seasons with the SuperSonics, and Watson signed as a free agent with the Memphis Grizzlies.

== Draft picks ==
Round	Pick	Player	Position	Nationality	College/club team
1	12	Vladimir Radmanovic	SF/PF	FR Yugoslavia	KK FMP
2	39	Earl Watson	PG	United States	UCLA
2	41	Bobby Simmons	SF/PF	United States	DePaul

== Roster ==
2001–02 Seattle SuperSonics roster
Players

Pos.	No.	Player	Height	Weight	DOB	From
F/C	42	Vin Baker	6 ft 11 in (2.11 m)	232 lb (105 kg)	1971–11–23	Hartford
G/F	31	Brent Barry	6 ft 7 in (2.01 m)	185 lb (84 kg)	1971–12–31	Oregon State
F/C	52	Calvin Booth (injured)	6 ft 11 in (2.11 m)	230 lb (104 kg)	1976–05–07	Penn State
F/C	14	Predrag Drobnjak	6 ft 11 in (2.11 m)	270 lb (122 kg)	1975–10–27	FR Yugoslavia
C	33	Jerome James	7 ft 0 in (2.13 m)	300 lb (136 kg)	1975–11–17	Florida A&M
F	7	Rashard Lewis	6 ft 10 in (2.08 m)	235 lb (107 kg)	1979–08–08	Alief Elsik HS (TX)
G	9	Randy Livingston	6 ft 4 in (1.93 m)	209 lb (95 kg)	1975–04–02	LSU
F	35	Art Long (injured)	6 ft 9 in (2.06 m)	250 lb (113 kg)	1972–10–01	Cincinnati
G/F	24	Desmond Mason	6 ft 7 in (2.01 m)	224 lb (102 kg)	1977–10–11	Oklahoma State
C	00	Olumide Oyedeji	6 ft 10 in (2.08 m)	240 lb (109 kg)	1981–05–11	Nigeria
G	20	Gary Payton	6 ft 4 in (1.93 m)	180 lb (82 kg)	1968–07–23	Oregon State
F	77	Vladimir Radmanović	6 ft 10 in (2.08 m)	227 lb (103 kg)	1980–11–19	FR Yugoslavia
F	45	Ansu Sesay	6 ft 9 in (2.06 m)	225 lb (102 kg)	1976–07–29	Mississippi
G	25	Earl Watson	6 ft 1 in (1.85 m)	195 lb (88 kg)	1979–06–12	UCLA
G	1	Shammond Williams	6 ft 1 in (1.85 m)	201 lb (91 kg)	1975–04–05	North Carolina

Coaches
Head coach
- Nate McMillan
Assistant(s)
- Dwane Casey
- Dwight Daub
- Dean Demopoulos
- Bob Weiss

Legend
- (DP) Unsigned draft pick
- (FA) Free agent
- (S) Suspended
- Injured

Roster

=== Roster Notes ===
- Point Guard Shammond Williams holds American and Georgian dual citizenship. He was born in the United States but he later played on the Georgian national team.

== Regular season ==
=== Season standings ===
Pacific Division	W	L	PCT	GB	Home	Road	Div
y-Sacramento Kings	61	21	.744	–	36–5	25–16	15–9
x-Los Angeles Lakers	58	24	.707	3	34–7	24–17	16–8
x-Portland Trail Blazers	49	33	.598	12	30–11	19–22	14–10
x-Seattle SuperSonics	45	37	.549	16	26–15	19–22	13–11
e-Los Angeles Clippers	39	43	.476	22	25–16	14–27	9–15
e-Phoenix Suns	36	46	.439	25	23–18	13–28	12–12
e-Golden State Warriors	21	61	.256	40	14–27	7–34	5–19

#	Western Conference				
#	Team	W	L	PCT	GB
1	z-Sacramento Kings	61	21	.744	–
2	y-San Antonio Spurs	58	24	.707	3
3	x-Los Angeles Lakers	58	24	.707	3
4	x-Dallas Mavericks	57	25	.695	4
5	x-Minnesota Timberwolves	50	32	.610	11
6	x-Portland Trail Blazers	49	33	.598	12
7	x-Seattle SuperSonics	45	37	.549	16
8	x-Utah Jazz	44	38	.537	17
9	e-Los Angeles Clippers	39	43	.476	22
10	e-Phoenix Suns	36	46	.439	25
11	e-Houston Rockets	28	54	.341	33
12	e-Denver Nuggets	27	55	.329	34
13	e-Memphis Grizzlies	23	59	.280	38
14	e-Golden State Warriors	21	61	.256	40

z - clinched division title
y - clinched division title
x - clinched playoff spot

== Playoffs ==
2002 playoff game log
First round: 2–3 (home: 1–1; road: 1–2)

Game	Date	Team	Score	High points	High rebounds	High assists	Location Attendance	Series
1	April 20	@ San Antonio	L 89–110	Vin Baker (22)	Vin Baker (7)	four players tied (2)	Alamodome; 23,634	0–1
2	April 22	@ San Antonio	W 98–90	Gary Payton (21)	Gary Payton (11)	Gary Payton (5)	Alamodome; 23,059	1–1
3	April 27	San Antonio	L 75–102	Gary Payton (20)	Brent Barry (8)	Gary Payton (6)	KeyArena; 17,072	1–2
4	May 1	San Antonio	W 91–79	Gary Payton (28)	Gary Payton (12)	Gary Payton (11)	KeyArena; 17,072	2–2
5	May 3	@ San Antonio	L 78–101	Gary Payton (23)	Gary Payton (9)	Gary Payton (5)	Alamodome; 23,369	2–3

2002 schedule

== Player statistics ==
Legend
GP	Games played	GS	Games started	MPG	Minutes per game
FG%	Field-goal percentage	3P%	3-point field-goal percentage	FT%	Free-throw percentage
RPG	Rebounds per game	APG	Assists per game	SPG	Steals per game
BPG	Blocks per game	PPG	Points per game

=== Season ===
Player	GP	GS	MPG	FG%	3P%	FT%	RPG	APG	SPG	BPG	PPG
Gary Payton	82	82	40.3	.467	.314	.797	4.8	9.0	1.6	0.3	22.1
Brent Barry	81	81	37.5	.508	.424	.846	5.4	5.3	1.8	0.5	14.4
Rashard Lewis	71	70	36.4	.468	.389	.810	7.0	1.7	1.5	0.6	16.8
Desmond Mason	75	20	32.3	.464	.271	.848	4.7	1.4	0.9	0.4	12.4
Vin Baker	55	41	31.1	.485	.125	.633	6.4	1.3	0.4	0.7	14.1
Vladimir Radmanovic	61	16	20.2	.412	.420	.681	3.8	1.3	0.9	0.4	6.7
Calvin Booth	15	15	18.6	.427		.958	3.6	1.1	0.4	0.9	6.2
Predrag Drobnjak	64	12	18.3	.461	.000	.753	3.4	0.8	0.3	0.5	6.8
Jerome James	56	40	16.9	.491		.500	4.1	0.4	0.4	1.5	5.3
Ansu Sesay	9	0	15.8	.500		.700	2.2	0.9	0.3	0.2	6.4
Art Long	63	27	15.7	.492		.529	4.0	0.7	0.3	0.4	4.5
Earl Watson	64	0	15.1	.453	.364	.639	1.3	2.0	0.9	0.1	3.6
Randy Livingston	13	0	13.5	.278	.125	.909	1.9	2.0	0.7	0.2	3.2
Shammond Williams	50	2	12.1	.420	.373	.795	1.3	1.7	0.4	0.0	4.4
Antonio Harvey	5	3	9.4	.333		.500	1.8	1.0	0.2	0.6	1.8
Olumide Oyedeji	36	1	6.1	.537		.611	2.2	0.1	0.1	0.1	1.5

=== Playoffs ===
Player	GP	GS	MPG	FG%	3P%	FT%	RPG	APG	SPG	BPG	PPG
Gary Payton	5	5	41.4	.425	.267	.586	8.6	5.8	0.6	0.4	22.2
Desmond Mason	5	5	41.0	.421	.333	.588	6.2	1.8	0.8	0.4	11.8
Brent Barry	5	5	29.8	.412	.438	1.000	4.6	2.8	0.6	0.8	7.8
Vin Baker	5	4	28.8	.500	1.000	.778	5.0	0.8	0.6	1.2	13.2
Rashard Lewis	3	2	26.3	.375	.167	1.000	3.7	0.7	0.3	0.0	12.7
Vladimir Radmanovic	5	2	22.6	.438	.538	1.000	3.6	1.0	0.2	0.2	7.6
Randy Livingston	5	0	16.0	.412	.333	1.000	1.2	2.0	0.4	0.0	4.0
Ansu Sesay	4	0	15.0	.375		1.000	3.5	1.0	0.0	1.0	1.8
Jerome James	5	1	14.0	.391		.000	2.4	0.8	0.0	1.0	3.6
Predrag Drobnjak	3	1	12.7	.333		.500	2.7	0.7	0.3	0.0	3.3
Shammond Williams	3	0	12.7	.429	.500	.667	1.3	1.0	0.7	0.0	5.3
Olumide Oyedeji	3	0	5.7	.800		.200	2.0	0.3	0.0	0.0	3.0

Player statistics citation:

== Awards and records ==
- Gary Payton, All-NBA Second Team
- Gary Payton, NBA All-Defensive First Team
- Vladimir Radmanovic, NBA All-Rookie Team 2nd Team

== See also ==
- 2001-02 NBA season
