= 2001–02 Golden State Warriors season =

NBA professional basketball team season

- Head coach: Dave Cowens; Brian Winters
- Owners: Chris Cohan
- Arena: The Arena in Oakland

Results
- Record: 21–61 (.256)
- Place: Division: 7th (Pacific); Conference: 14th (Western)
- Playoff finish: Did not qualify
- Stats at Basketball Reference

The 2001–02 Golden State Warriors season was the 56th season for the Golden State Warriors in the National Basketball Association, and their 40th season in the San Francisco Bay Area.

== Season summary ==
=== Off-season ===
The Warriors received the fifth overall pick in the 2001 NBA draft, and selected shooting guard Jason Richardson from Michigan State University; the team also selected power forward Troy Murphy from the University of Notre Dame with the 14th overall pick, and selected point guard Gilbert Arenas from the University of Arizona with the 31st overall pick.

=== Regular season ===
With the addition of Richardson, Murphy and Arenas to help with their struggles the past seasons, the Warriors got off to a 5–3 start to the regular season. However, the team continued to struggle falling below .500 in winning percentage, and losing 12 of their next 15 games. Head coach Dave Cowens was fired after an 8–15 start to the season after clashing with several players, and was replaced with assistant coach Brian Winters as an interim coach. At mid-season, the team traded second-year center Marc Jackson to the Minnesota Timberwolves in exchange for Dean Garrett. The Warriors posted a 10-game losing streak in March, and finished in last place in the Pacific Division with a league-worst 21–61 record, which tied the Chicago Bulls, who also finished with the same record. The Warriors missed the NBA playoffs for the eighth consecutive year.

Antawn Jamison averaged 19.7 points and 6.8 rebounds per game, while Richardson averaged 14.4 points and 1.3 steals per game, and was named to the NBA All-Rookie First Team, and Larry Hughes provided the team with 12.3 points, 4.3 assists and 1.5 steals per game. In addition, Danny Fortson provided with 11.2 points and 11.7 rebounds per game, while Arenas contributed 10.9 points, 3.7 assists and 1.5 steals per game, but only played just 47 games due to injury, and Bob Sura contributed 10.0 points and 3.5 assists per game. Meanwhile, Erick Dampier averaged 7.6 points, 5.3 rebounds and 2.3 blocks per game, Chris Mills contributed 7.4 points per game, Murphy provided with 5.9 points and 3.9 rebounds per game, and Adonal Foyle averaged 4.8 points, 4.9 rebounds and 2.1 blocks per game.

During the NBA All-Star weekend at the First Union Center in Philadelphia, Pennsylvania, Richardson won the NBA Slam Dunk Contest, and was also selected for the NBA Rookie Challenge Game, as a member of the Rookies team. Richardson scored 26 points along with 6 rebounds, and was named the Rookie Challenge Game's Most Valuable Player, as the Rookies defeated the Sophomores team, 103–97. He also finished tied in third place in Rookie of the Year voting.

The Warriors finished 24th in the NBA in home-game attendance, with an attendance of 593,182 at The Arena in Oakland during the regular season.

=== Aftermath ===
Following the season, Hughes signed as a free agent with the Washington Wizards, while Winters was fired as head coach, Garrett was released to free agency and Mookie Blaylock retired.

== Offseason ==
=== Draft picks ===
Round	Pick	Player	Position	Nationality	College
1	5	Jason Richardson	SG	United States	Michigan State University
1	14	Troy Murphy	PF	United States	University of Notre Dame
2	31	Gilbert Arenas	PG	United States	University of Arizona

== Roster ==
2001–02 Golden State Warriors roster
Players

Pos.	No.	Player	Height	Weight	DOB	From
G	0	Gilbert Arenas	6 ft 3 in (1.91 m)	191 lb (87 kg)		Arizona
G	10	Mookie Blaylock (injured)	6 ft 0 in (1.83 m)	180 lb (82 kg)		Oklahoma
C	25	Erick Dampier	6 ft 11 in (2.11 m)	265 lb (120 kg)		Mississippi State
F/C	21	Danny Fortson	6 ft 7 in (2.01 m)	260 lb (118 kg)		Cincinnati
C	31	Adonal Foyle	6 ft 10 in (2.08 m)	270 lb (122 kg)		Colgate
C	22	Dean Garrett	6 ft 10 in (2.08 m)	225 lb (102 kg)		Indiana
F	45	Cedric Henderson (injured)	6 ft 7 in (2.01 m)	215 lb (98 kg)		Memphis
G/F	20	Larry Hughes	6 ft 5 in (1.96 m)	184 lb (83 kg)		Saint Louis
F	33	Antawn Jamison	6 ft 8 in (2.03 m)	223 lb (101 kg)		North Carolina
F	34	Chris Mills	6 ft 6 in (1.98 m)	215 lb (98 kg)		Arizona
F/C	1	Troy Murphy	6 ft 11 in (2.11 m)	245 lb (111 kg)		Notre Dame
G	2	Dean Oliver	5 ft 11 in (1.80 m)	180 lb (82 kg)		Iowa
G/F	23	Jason Richardson	6 ft 6 in (1.98 m)	220 lb (100 kg)		Michigan State
G	3	Bob Sura	6 ft 5 in (1.96 m)	200 lb (91 kg)		Florida State

Coaches
Head coach
- Brian Winters
Assistant(s)
- Phil Hubbard
- Mark Osowski
- Clifford Ray
- Tom Sterner

Legend
- (DP) Unsigned draft pick
- (FA) Free agent
- (S) Suspended
- Injured

Roster

== Regular season ==
=== Season standings ===
Pacific Division	W	L	PCT	GB	Home	Road	Div
y-Sacramento Kings	61	21	.744	–	36–5	25–16	15–9
x-Los Angeles Lakers	58	24	.707	3	34–7	24–17	16–8
x-Portland Trail Blazers	49	33	.598	12	30–11	19–22	14–10
x-Seattle SuperSonics	45	37	.549	16	26–15	19–22	13–11
e-Los Angeles Clippers	39	43	.476	22	25–16	14–27	9–15
e-Phoenix Suns	36	46	.439	25	23–18	13–28	12–12
e-Golden State Warriors	21	61	.256	40	14–27	7–34	5–19

#	Western Conference				
#	Team	W	L	PCT	GB
1	z-Sacramento Kings	61	21	.744	–
2	y-San Antonio Spurs	58	24	.707	3
3	x-Los Angeles Lakers	58	24	.707	3
4	x-Dallas Mavericks	57	25	.695	4
5	x-Minnesota Timberwolves	50	32	.610	11
6	x-Portland Trail Blazers	49	33	.598	12
7	x-Seattle SuperSonics	45	37	.549	16
8	x-Utah Jazz	44	38	.537	17
9	e-Los Angeles Clippers	39	43	.476	22
10	e-Phoenix Suns	36	46	.439	25
11	e-Houston Rockets	28	54	.341	33
12	e-Denver Nuggets	27	55	.329	34
13	e-Memphis Grizzlies	23	59	.280	38
14	e-Golden State Warriors	21	61	.256	40

z - clinched division title
y - clinched division title
x - clinched playoff spot

== Player statistics ==
Legend
GP	Games played	GS	Games started	MPG	Minutes per game
FG%	Field-goal percentage	3P%	3-point field-goal percentage	FT%	Free-throw percentage
RPG	Rebounds per game	APG	Assists per game	SPG	Steals per game
BPG	Blocks per game	PPG	Points per game

=== Regular season ===
Player	GP	GS	MPG	FG%	3P%	FT%	RPG	APG	SPG	BPG	PPG
Antawn Jamison	82	82	37.0	.447	.324	.734	6.8	2.0	.9	.5	19.7
Troy Murphy	82	4	17.7	.421	.333	.776	3.9	.9	.4	.3	5.9
Jason Richardson	80	75	32.9	.426	.333	.671	4.3	3.0	1.3	.4	14.4
Adonal Foyle	79	36	18.8	.444		.398	4.9	.5	.5	2.1	4.8
Bob Sura	78	5	22.8	.424	.316	.720	3.3	3.5	1.1	.2	10.0
Danny Fortson	77	76	28.8	.428	.250	.795	11.7	1.6	.6	.2	11.2
Larry Hughes	73	56	28.1	.423	.194	.737	3.4	4.3	1.5	.3	12.3
Erick Dampier	73	46	23.8	.435		.645	5.3	1.2	.2	2.3	7.6
Chris Mills	66	0	18.7	.417	.378	.794	2.9	1.1	.5	.2	7.4
Gilbert Arenas	47	30	24.6	.453	.345	.775	2.8	3.7	1.5	.2	10.9
Mookie Blaylock	35	0	17.1	.342	.357	.500	1.5	3.3	.7	.1	3.4
Dean Oliver	20	0	7.0	.370	.154	.667	.4	1.1	.2	.0	2.1
Marc Jackson^{†}	17	0	9.9	.338		.833	2.5	.4	.3	.2	4.9
Cedric Henderson	12	0	5.8	.484	.500	.571	.3	.3	.5	.2	3.0
Dean Garrett^{†}	5	0	6.2	.267			2.0	.2	.4	.2	1.6

- ^{†} Denotes player spent time with another team in the season. Stats reflect time with the Warriors only.

Player statistics citation:

== See also ==
- 2001–02 NBA season
