= Harold Jamison =

American basketball player

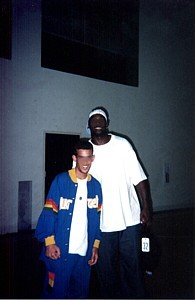
- Jamison (right) pictured with a fan in 2002

Personal information
- Born: November 20, 1976 (age 49) Orangeburg, South Carolina
- Listed height: 6 ft 8 in (2.03 m)
- Listed weight: 260 lb (118 kg)

Career information
- High school: Holy Hill-Roberts (Vance, South Carolina)
- College: Clemson (1995–1999)
- NBA draft: 1999: undrafted
- Playing career: 1999–2013
- Position: Power forward
- Number: 6, 40

Career history
- 1999–2000: Miami Heat
- 2000–2001: Śląsk Wrocław
- 2001–2002: Los Angeles Clippers
- 2003: Śląsk Wrocław
- 2003–2004: Scandone Avellino
- 2004: Prokom Trefl Sopot
- 2004–2006: Scafati Basket
- 2006–2007: Scandone Avellino
- 2007: Atléticos de San Germán
- 2007–2010: Carife Ferrara
- 2010: Trabzonspor Basketball
- 2011: Politekhnika-Halychyna
- 2011: Bejjeh
- 2012: Champville
- 2012–2013: Bejjeh
- 2013: Duhok
- Stats at NBA.com
- Stats at Basketball Reference

Harold Sherill Jamison (born November 20, 1976) is an American former professional basketball player. Born in Orangeburg, South Carolina, he is 6'8" and played at power forward.

== Basketball career ==
In college, Jamison played for Clemson University. He started his National Basketball Association career with the Miami Heat in 1999–2000, appearing in 12 games.

His second season was with the Los Angeles Clippers (2001–02) for whom he played 25 games for and averaged 2.2 points and 1.6 rebounds. After which he was traded along with Darius Miles to the Cleveland Cavaliers in exchange for Andre Miller and Bryant Stith, but he was shortly after waived. Jamison's final NBA game was played on April 17, 2002, in a 103–107 loss to the Golden State Warriors (the team's final game of the season). In his final game, Jamison recorded 4 points, 5 rebounds and 1 assist.

Jamison also played professionally in Poland, Italy, Puerto Rico, Turkey, Greece, Ukraine, and Lebanon.
