= Eduardo Nájera =

Mexican professional basketball player (born 1976)

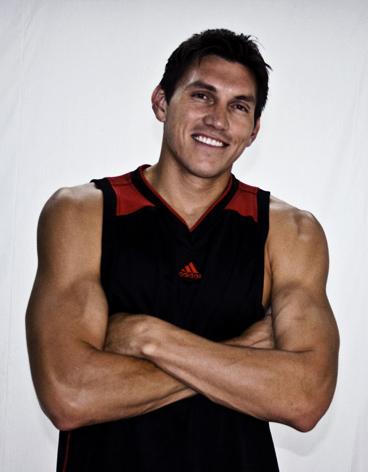
- Nájera in 2008

Dallas Mavericks
- Title: Scout
- League: NBA

Personal information
- Born: July 11, 1976 (age 50) Ciudad Meoqui, Chihuahua, Mexico
- Listed height: 6 ft 8 in (2.03 m)
- Listed weight: 235 lb (107 kg)

Career information
- High school: Cornerstone Christian Academy (San Antonio, Texas)
- College: Oklahoma (1996–2000)
- NBA draft: 2000: 2nd round, 38th overall pick
- Drafted by: Houston Rockets
- Playing career: 2000–2012
- Position: Power forward / small forward
- Number: 14, 21
- Coaching career: 2012–2015

Career history

Playing
- 2000–2004: Dallas Mavericks
- 2004–2005: Golden State Warriors
- 2005–2008: Denver Nuggets
- 2008–2010: New Jersey Nets
- 2010: Dallas Mavericks
- 2010–2012: Charlotte Bobcats

Coaching
- 2012–2015: Texas Legends

Career highlights
- Third-team All-American – AP, NABC (2000); Chip Hilton Player of the Year (2000); First-team All-Big 12 (2000); Second-team All-Big 12 (1999); Big 12 All-Defensive team (2000); Big 12 All-Freshman team (1997)
- Stats at NBA.com
- Stats at Basketball Reference

Eduardo Alonso Nájera Pérez (Spanish pronunciation: [eˈðwaɾðo ˈnaxeɾa]) (born July 11, 1976) is a Mexican former professional basketball player who is currently a scout for the Dallas Mavericks of the National Basketball Association (NBA). He is also a pregame and postgame analyst on Mavericks Live on Fox Sports Southwest. Before being promoted to a scout with the Mavs, he was head coach of the Texas Legends of the NBA D-League. He is regarded as the greatest Mexican basketball player ever.

== Personal information ==
Nájera was only the second Mexican-born NBA player (Horacio Llamas was the first) and was the first Mexican player to be drafted. He is the son of Servando Nájera and Rosa Irene Pérez.

== College basketball ==
Nájera played college basketball at the University of Oklahoma, in Norman, Oklahoma, United States, from 1997 to 2000, becoming a major star there. He helped the team to four consecutive NCAA tournament appearances during his college career, as well as finishing in the school's all-time top ten in nine statistical categories. Before being drafted into the NBA in 2000, Nájera received rave reviews from scouts, who boasted on Nájera's quick first step and extraordinary rebounding ability. He is only the second Mexican-born player to join the NBA. He was the first Mexican player to be drafted into the NBA (Horacio Llamas being undrafted).

Nájera played for the Mexican team in the 1997 World University Games and helped them achieve a fourth-place finish in the 1999 World University Games.

== Professional career ==
=== Dallas Mavericks (2000–2004) ===
He saw significant action as a member of the Dallas Mavericks in 2000–01 and 2001–02, but recurrent knee injuries limited his action in his last two years in Dallas.

He coached at the first-ever Basketball Without Borders Americas tournament in Rio de Janeiro, Brazil, during the 2004 NBA Summer of Goodwill.

=== Golden State Warriors (2004–2005) ===
On August 24, 2004, Nájera was traded along with Luis Flores, Christian Laettner, Mladen Sekularac, cash, a 2007 first-round draft pick, and another future first-round draft pick to the Golden State Warriors in exchange for Erick Dampier, Dan Dickau, Evan Eschmeyer, and Steve Logan. In Golden State, Najera again put in modest minutes and was a solid contributor.

=== Denver Nuggets (2005–2008) ===
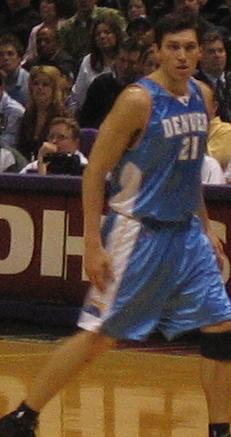
Najera with the Denver Nuggets

On February 24, 2005, Nájera was then sent to the Denver Nuggets along with Luis Flores and a future first-round pick in exchange for Nikoloz Tskitishvili and Rodney White, where he would have some of his most productive seasons as an NBA player.

Also in 2006, an exhibition match was played in Monterrey, Mexico, between the Golden State Warriors and the Denver Nuggets.

On April 27, 2006, Nájera started his first playoff game for the Nuggets in Game 3 of their first round series facing the Los Angeles Clippers. He replaced Kenyon Martin who was suspended indefinitely for "conduct detrimental to the team".

He was partly involved in the December 2006 Knicks–Nuggets brawl. While not involved in the actual fighting, he did try to separate the players. He was ejected from the game for leaving the bench.

=== New Jersey Nets (2008–2010) ===
On July 11, 2008, Nájera signed a contract with the New Jersey Nets for 4 years $12 million. He stated that he would make it a point to turn the Nets' young forwards Yi Jianlian and Ryan Anderson and center Brook Lopez into stronger, tougher players. Nájera turned down more money and a chance to return to his college state, Oklahoma City Thunder. He also turned down an offer from the New Orleans Hornets in order to take a chance to lead a young and talented New Orleans team.

=== Return to Dallas (2010) ===
On January 11, 2010, Nájera was traded to the Dallas Mavericks for Kris Humphries and Shawne Williams.

=== Charlotte Bobcats (2010–2012) ===
On July 13, 2010, Nájera was traded to the Charlotte Bobcats along with Erick Dampier and Matt Carroll in exchange for Tyson Chandler and Alexis Ajinça. Nájera's final NBA game ever was played on April 6, 2012, in a 90–95 loss to the Milwaukee Bucks where he only played for two minutes and recorded no stats, suffering a career-ending facial injury.

== Coaching career ==
In 2012, after he retired as a player, Nájera became head coach of the NBA D-League's Texas Legends. Prior to the 2015–16 season, Texas replaced him with his assistant coach, Nick Van Exel.

== Off the court ==
In High School, his recruitment to Cornerstone Christian School caused the school to be banned from TAPPS competition.

In 2000, Eduardo Nájera was named Third Team All-American by both the Associated Press and the National Association of Basketball Coaches, being the first Mexican-born to be named so.

In 2000, Nájera graduated from the University of Oklahoma with a degree in sociology.

In the same year, he received the Chip Hilton Player of the Year Award from the Basketball Hall of Fame, an award given to a player who has demonstrated personal character both on and off the court.

In 2001, Nájera served as the United Nations Drug Control Programme Goodwill Ambassador for Sports Against Drugs. In 2004, he established the Eduardo Najera Foundation for Latino Achievement, which provides college scholarships for outstanding Latino students facing barriers to their educations, and in 2006, he received the Chopper Travaglini Award for demonstrating outstanding charity work in the Denver community.

== NBA career statistics ==
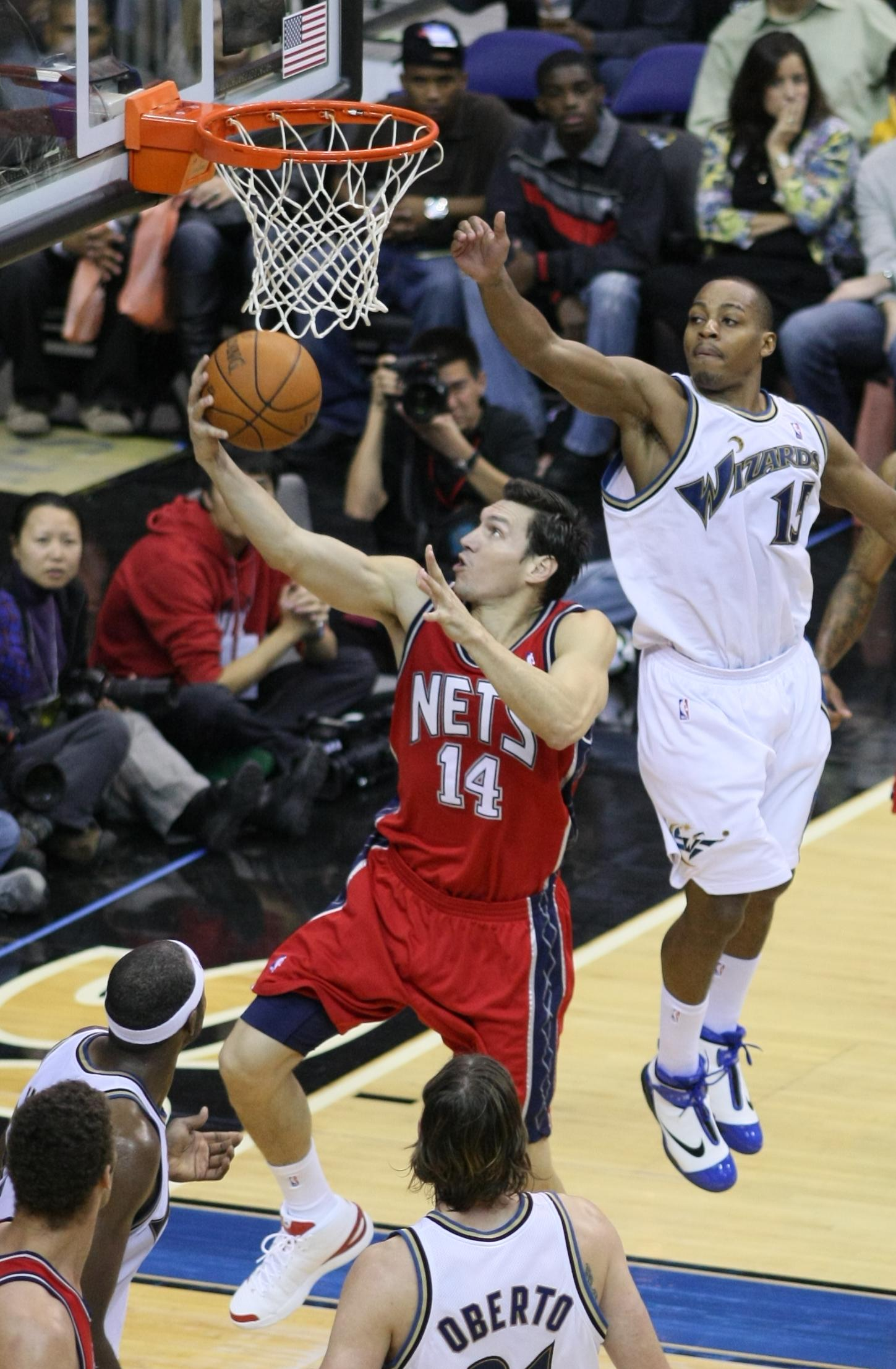
Eduardo Najera in the 2009–10 season

Legend
GP	Games played	GS	Games started	MPG	Minutes per game
FG%	Field goal percentage	3P%	3-point field goal percentage	FT%	Free throw percentage
RPG	Rebounds per game	APG	Assists per game	SPG	Steals per game
BPG	Blocks per game	PPG	Points per game	**Bold**	Career high

=== Regular season ===
Year	Team	GP	GS	MPG	FG%	3P%	FT%	RPG	APG	SPG	BPG	PPG
2000–01	Dallas	40	4	10.8	.523	.333	.424	2.4	.7	.3	.2	3.3
2001–02	Dallas	62	11	21.9	.500	.000	.676	**5.5**	.6	.9	**.5**	6.5
2002–03	Dallas	48	12	**23.0**	.558	.000	.681	4.6	1.0	.8	**.5**	6.7
2003–04	Dallas	58	7	12.4	.444	**.500**	.652	2.7	.4	.6	.3	3.0
2004–05	Golden State	42	4	14.5	.407	.400	.644	2.8	.9	.4	.2	4.2
2004–05	Denver	26	0	22.1	.500	.000	.630	4.8	1.1	.9	**.5**	**6.9**
2005–06	Denver	64	3	22.6	.422	.333	**.781**	5.1	.8	.8	**.5**	5.4
2006–07	Denver	75	**36**	22.1	**.576**	.083	.715	4.1	.9	**1.0**	.3	6.6
2007–08	Denver	**78**	3	21.3	.473	.361	.708	4.3	**1.2**	.9	**.5**	5.9
2008–09	New Jersey	27	0	11.8	.446	.200	.364	2.5	.7	.4	.1	2.9
2009–10	New Jersey	13	2	15.7	.377	.176	.500	2.9	**1.2**	.7	.2	3.8
2009–10	Dallas	33	3	14.6	.452	.340	.667	2.3	.4	.5	.4	3.3
2010–11	Charlotte	31	0	12.0	.361	.324	.545	1.4	.6	.4	.2	2.2
2011–12	Charlotte	22	0	12.3	.375	.276	.500	2.3	.5	.9	.2	2.6
Career		619	85	18.1	.481	.311	.671	3.7	.8	.7	.4	4.9

=== Playoffs ===
Year	Team	GP	GS	MPG	FG%	3P%	FT%	RPG	APG	SPG	BPG	PPG
2001	Dallas	7	0	6.3	.529	**.750**	.000	2.1	.1	.1	.1	3.0
2002	Dallas	8	4	15.3	**.696**	.000	.625	1.6	.1	.4	.0	4.6
2003	Dallas	**19**	**5**	20.7	.453	.000	.792	3.9	.8	.7	.2	**6.1**
2004	Dallas	5	0	11.4	.455	.000	**1.000**	3.4	.6	.6	**.4**	2.4
2005	Denver	2	0	6.5	.000	.000	.000	1.0	.5	.0	.0	.0
2006	Denver	4	3	**22.3**	.214	.000	.500	3.8	.5	**.8**	.0	2.0
2007	Denver	5	0	19.2	.235	.000	.500	**5.6**	.4	.4	.2	1.8
2008	Denver	4	0	19.5	.500	.400	.000	3.3	**1.5**	**.8**	.3	4.0
2010	Dallas	5	0	7.2	.250	.000	.000	1.8	.0	.4	.0	.8
Career		59	12	15.7	.443	.294	.750	3.2	.5	.5	.2	3.8

=== Career highs ===
- Points: 19: 2 times
- Rebounds: 15: vs. Houston 04/11/02
- Assists: 7: @ Milwaukee 01/09/09
- Steals: 6: 2 times
- Blocks: 4: vs. Seattle 12/29/05

== Head coaching record ==
=== NBA Developmental League ===
Team	Year	G	W	L	W–L%	Finish	PG	PW	PL	PW–L%	Result
Texas	2012–13	50	21	29	.420	5th in Central	—	—	—	—	Missed playoffs
Texas	2013–14	50	24	26	.480	4th in Central	—	—	—	—	Missed playoffs
Texas	2014–15	50	23	27	.460	4th in Southwest	—	—	—	—	Missed playoffs
Career		150	67	83	.447		0	0	0	–	
