= Greg Buckner =

American basketball player & coach (born 1976)

Orlando Magic
- Title: Assistant coach
- League: NBA

Personal information
- Born: September 16, 1976 (age 50) Hopkinsville, Kentucky, U.S.
- Listed height: 6 ft 4 in (1.93 m)
- Listed weight: 210 lb (95 kg)

Career information
- High school: University Heights Academy (Hopkinsville, Kentucky)
- College: Clemson (1994–1998)
- NBA draft: 1998: 2nd round, 53rd overall pick
- Drafted by: Dallas Mavericks
- Playing career: 1998–2009
- Position: Shooting guard / small forward
- Number: 21, 7, 1
- Coaching career: 2011–present

Career history

Playing
- 1998–1999: Grand Rapids Hoops
- 1999–2002: Dallas Mavericks
- 2002–2004: Philadelphia 76ers
- 2004–2006: Denver Nuggets
- 2006–2007: Dallas Mavericks
- 2007–2008: Minnesota Timberwolves
- 2008–2009: Memphis Grizzlies

Coaching
- 2011-2017: Houston Rockets (assistant)
- 2017–2019: Memphis Grizzlies (assistant)
- 2020–2024: Cleveland Cavaliers (assistant)
- 2024–2026: Milwaukee Bucks (assistant)
- 2026–present: Orlando Magic (assistant)

Career highlights
- As player: 2× Second-team All-ACC (1997, 1998); ACC Rookie of the Year (1995); As assistant coach: NBA Cup champion (2024)

Career NBA statistics
- Points: 2,878 (5.0 ppg)
- Rebounds: 1,593 (2.8 rpg)
- Assists: 719 (1.3 apg)
- Stats at NBA.com
- Stats at Basketball Reference
Medals
Men's basketball
Representing United States
Summer Universiade
Gold medal – first place	1997 Trapani	Team competition

Gregory Derayle Buckner (born September 16, 1976) is an American former professional basketball player who is an assistant coach for the Orlando Magic of the National Basketball Association (NBA). He had previously served as an assistant coach for the Memphis Grizzlies and Cleveland Cavaliers.

Selected in the second round (53rd pick overall) of the 1998 NBA draft by the Dallas Mavericks after playing college basketball at Clemson, he played for the Mavericks, Philadelphia 76ers, Denver Nuggets, Minnesota Timberwolves and Grizzlies. Buckner's first professional experience came with the Grand Rapids Hoops of the Continental Basketball Association (CBA), where he averaged 8.6 points and 3.9 rebounds per game in the 1998–99 season.

== Playing career ==
=== College career ===
During his time with the Clemson Tigers, he started all 122 games of his career while guiding the team to three NCAA tournaments. Buckner led the team in scoring all four years becoming the first Clemson Tiger to do so. In 1995, Buckner was named ACC Rookie of the Year. He was entered into the Clemson Athletic Hall of Fame in 2005.

=== Professional career ===
After playing with the Dallas Mavericks from 1999 to 2002, Buckner signed with the Philadelphia 76ers as a free agent. Then he signed with the Denver Nuggets. In 2006, he re-signed with the Dallas Mavericks, but after one season, he was traded to the Timberwolves for Trenton Hassell on September 28, 2007. On June 27, 2008, the Timberwolves traded him to the Memphis Grizzlies with O. J. Mayo, Marko Jarić, and Antoine Walker for Kevin Love, Mike Miller, Brian Cardinal, and Jason Collins.

On July 9, 2009, Buckner was traded to the Dallas Mavericks as a part of the four-team deal among Grizzlies, Mavericks, Orlando Magic and Toronto Raptors.

== Coaching career ==
On July 29, 2011, Buckner joined the Houston Rockets as a player development coach, serving for five seasons. Buckner reached the playoffs three times with the team as part of the coaching staff. He would later become an assistant coach with the Memphis Grizzlies, and in November 2020, became an assistant coach with the Cleveland Cavaliers. On April 21, 2021, Buckner got his first NBA head coaching victory when he temporarily replaced head coach J. B. Bickerstaff as the Cavaliers won 121–105 against the Chicago Bulls. On June 13, 2022, the Cavaliers promoted Buckner to associate head coach position.

On July 6, 2026, the Orlando Magic hired Buckner to serve as an assistant coach under head coach Sean Sweeney.

== Career statistics ==
Legend
GP	Games played	GS	Games started	MPG	Minutes per game
FG%	Field goal percentage	3P%	3-point field goal percentage	FT%	Free throw percentage
RPG	Rebounds per game	APG	Assists per game	SPG	Steals per game
BPG	Blocks per game	PPG	Points per game	**Bold**	Career high

=== Regular season ===
Year	Team	GP	GS	MPG	FG%	3P%	FT%	RPG	APG	SPG	BPG	PPG
1999–00	Dallas	48	1	19.2	.476	.385	.683	3.6	1.1	.8	**.4**	5.7
2000–01	Dallas	37	9	22.2	.438	.286	.728	**4.2**	1.3	.9	.2	6.2
2001–02	Dallas	44	16	20.1	.525	.313	.690	3.9	1.1	.7	**.4**	5.8
2002–03	Philadelphia	75	5	20.2	.465	.273	.802	2.9	1.3	1.0	.2	6.0
2003–04	Philadelphia	53	3	13.3	.377	.273	.741	1.9	.8	.4	.1	3.1
2004–05	Denver	70	**41**	21.7	**.528**	**.405**	.778	3.0	**1.9**	1.1	.1	6.2
2005–06	Denver	73	27	**24.1**	.434	.354	.782	2.9	1.7	**1.2**	.3	**6.7**
2006–07	Dallas	**76**	11	18.1	.411	.311	.794	2.1	.9	.6	.1	4.0
2007–08	Minnesota	31	4	16.8	.385	.300	**.864**	2.1	1.3	.7	.1	4.0
2008–09	Memphis	63	0	13.9	.384	.255	.800	2.1	.9	.5	.1	2.5
Career		570	117	19.1	.450	.334	.757	2.8	1.3	.8	.2	5.0

=== Playoffs ===
Year	Team	GP	GS	MPG	FG%	3P%	FT%	RPG	APG	SPG	BPG	PPG
2001	Dallas	5	0	15.0	.478	**.333**	.700	**4.2**	.6	**1.0**	.0	6.0
2002	Dallas	7	0	15.0	**.480**	.000	.750	3.7	.6	.4	.1	3.9
2003	Philadelphia	**10**	0	11.2	.323	.222	**1.000**	1.7	.3	.1	**.2**	2.6
2005	Denver	5	2	20.0	.222	.222	—	3.2	1.0	.4	**.2**	2.0
2006	Denver	5	**4**	**27.4**	.418	.313	.875	2.8	**1.2**	.6	**.2**	**12.6**
2007	Dallas	6	0	7.3	.000	.000	.500	1.0	.3	.3	**.2**	.2
Career		38	6	15.1	.377	.259	.786	2.6	.6	.4	.2	4.1
