= Raef LaFrentz =

American basketball player (born 1976)

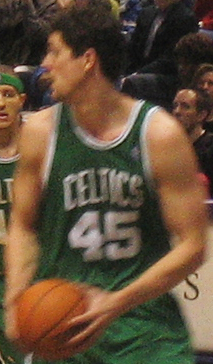
- LaFrentz with the Boston Celtics in 2006

Personal information
- Born: May 29, 1976 (age 50) Hampton, Iowa, U.S.
- Listed height: 6 ft 11 in (2.11 m)
- Listed weight: 240 lb (109 kg)

Career information
- High school: MFL MarMac (Monona, Iowa)
- College: Kansas (1994–1998)
- NBA draft: 1998: 1st round, 3rd overall pick
- Drafted by: Denver Nuggets
- Playing career: 1998–2009
- Position: Power forward / center
- Number: 45, 9
- Coaching career: 2019–present

Career history

Playing
- 1998–2002: Denver Nuggets
- 2002–2003: Dallas Mavericks
- 2003–2006: Boston Celtics
- 2006–2009: Portland Trail Blazers

Career highlights
- 2× Consensus first-team All-American (1997, 1998); 2× Big 12 Player of the Year (1997, 1998); 2× First-team All-Big 12 (1997, 1998); First-team All-Big Eight (1996); No. 45 jersey retired by Kansas Jayhawks; McDonald's All-American (1994); Second-team Parade All-American (1994); Iowa Mr. Basketball (1994)

Career NBA statistics
- Points: 5,690 (10.1 ppg)
- Rebounds: 3,423 (6.1 rpg)
- Blocks: 919 (1.6 bpg)
- Stats at NBA.com
- Stats at Basketball Reference

Raef Andrew LaFrentz (born May 29, 1976) is an American former professional basketball power forward and center who played for the Denver Nuggets, Dallas Mavericks, Boston Celtics, and Portland Trail Blazers of the National Basketball Association (NBA). Born and raised in Iowa, LaFrentz attended the University of Kansas and was drafted in 1998 by the Denver Nuggets. He was known for his perimeter shooting and his shot blocking abilities. In 2019–20 LaFrentz became an assistant basketball coach at Decorah High School in Decorah, Iowa.

== Career ==
=== High school ===
Raef LaFrentz attended MFL MarMac High School located in Monona, Iowa. His father, Ron, was an assistant coach on LaFrentz's high school team. He was named to the USA Today All-USA 1st Team in 1994 and was a high school McDonald's All-American.

During the summer before his freshman year at the University of Kansas, LaFrentz was selected to the 1994 U.S. Olympic Festival North Team and averaged 11.8 ppg. and 6.8 rpg.

=== College ===
LaFrentz played basketball at Kansas, finishing in 1998. He played with future NBA Hall of Famer Paul Pierce and journeyman Scot Pollard while at Kansas. The 1996–97 team finished the season ranked #1 in the country, but lost to Arizona (led by future NBA stars Jason Terry and Mike Bibby) in the Regional Semifinal. He was a four-year starter and an All-American in his junior and senior seasons. He joined Tim Duncan and Shaquille O'Neal as the only players in the 1990s to earn first team AP All-America honors twice.

Compiling career averages of 15.8 ppg and 9.1 rpg while shooting 55.5 percent from the floor overall, he concluded his career ranked second all-time at Kansas in points with 2,066 and rebounds with 1,186, and left trailing only Danny Manning in both categories.

Accumulating a record of 123–17 (87.9 winning percentage) over his four seasons, he was part of a senior class that won more games over a four-year period than any class in KU history.

Named by the A.P. in 1997 and 1998 the Big 12 Conference Player of the Year, he was also tabbed All-Big 12 Conference first team by both the media and coaches his final two seasons.

LaFrentz became the first KU player in 27 years to average a double-double over an entire season when he posted 19.8 ppg and 11.4 rpg averages as a senior in 1997–98, leading the Jayhawks to a 35–4 record.

=== NBA ===
The third overall pick by the Denver Nuggets in the 1998 NBA draft, LaFrentz averaged 13.8 ppg., 7.6 rpg. and 1.4 bpg. but played in just 12 games as a rookie and missed the majority of the season after suffering a torn ACL in his left knee against Dallas on February 25, 1999. Successfully returning from the torn ACL to start 80 of his 81 appearances in 1999–2000, he averaged 12.4 ppg., an NBA 25th best 7.9 rpg. and ranked eighth in the NBA in blocked shots, averaging 2.2 bpg. LaFrentz also played in the 2000 NBA All-Star Weekend. He played on the NBA All-Star Weekend Rookie Challenge Sophomore Roster. It was the first ever Sophomore team to play in the rookie challenge. It was there at NBA All-Star Weekend that LaFrentz was on the receiving end of Jason Williams' legendary "elbow pass". LaFrentz was unable to score on the play due to being fouled. In his third year (2000–01), he started 74 of the 78 games he played in and averaged 12.9 ppg., while ranking seventh in the league in blocks at 2.6 bpg., tied for 25th in rebounding with a 7.8 rpg. average, and tied for 27th in field goal percentage (career high .477).

Between November 2001 and February 2002, LaFrentz had a historical run in which he totaled at least five 3-pointers and five blocked shots in four separate games (in a span of just three months); up to that point, it had only occurred four times total in NBA history, and no one had done it more than once. He remains the all-time leader in league history in reaching that milestone. Kristaps Porziņģis is second with three such games in his career, each with a different team.

LaFrentz was traded by the Nuggets with Nick Van Exel, Avery Johnson, and Tariq Abdul-Wahad to the Dallas Mavericks for Juwan Howard, Donnell Harvey, Tim Hardaway and a 2002 first-round pick on February 21, 2002. He finished the 2001–02 season second in the NBA in blocked shots per game.

LaFrentz played for the US national team in the 2002 FIBA World Championship.

The Celtics acquired LaFrentz from the Dallas Mavericks, along with Chris Mills, Jiri Welsch and a first-round draft choice, in exchange for Tony Delk and Antoine Walker on October 20, 2003.

On November 13, 2005, LaFrentz became the first NBA player to have a perfect 7–7 three point shooting half. This feat would be tied by 10 other NBA players before it was eclipsed by Jalen Brunson with an 8–8 half on December 15, 2023. On June 28, 2006, the Boston Celtics traded LaFrentz, guard Dan Dickau, and the number seven pick in the 2006 NBA draft to the Portland Trail Blazers for center Theo Ratliff and guard Sebastian Telfair. The number 7 pick (Randy Foye) was later traded by the Blazers for the number 6 pick (Brandon Roy) in a draft day trade.

=== Career highlights and awards ===
College

- NCAA Division I men's basketball player with 2000 points and 1000 rebounds
- NCAA Men's Basketball Consensus All-American (1997, 1998)
- Kansas Jayhawks Retired Basketball Jersey #45
- Big 12 Conference Men's Basketball Player of the Year

NBA

- Third overall pick in the 1998 NBA draft
- Played in 2000 NBA All-Star Weekend
- Led Western Conference in Blocks (2001–02)
- Led Western Conference in Blocks per game (2001–02)
- Played on United States men's national basketball team (2002)

NBA records

- Most blocks in an NBA All-Star Weekend Rookie Challenge Game
- Most blocks per game in NBA All-Star Weekend Rookie Challenge history

== Career statistics ==
Legend
GP	Games played	GS	Games started	MPG	Minutes per game
FG%	Field goal percentage	3P%	3-point field goal percentage	FT%	Free throw percentage
RPG	Rebounds per game	APG	Assists per game	SPG	Steals per game
BPG	Blocks per game	PPG	Points per game	**Bold**	Career high
*	Led the league

=== NBA ===
==== Regular season ====
Year	Team	GP	GS	MPG	FG%	3P%	FT%	RPG	APG	SPG	BPG	PPG
1998–99	Denver	12	12	32.3	.457	.387	.750	7.6	.7	.8	1.4	13.8
1999–00	Denver	81	**80**	30.1	.446	.328	.686	**7.9**	1.2	.5	2.2	12.4
2000–01	Denver	78	74	31.5	.477	.367	.698	7.8	**1.4**	.5	2.6	12.9
2001–02	Denver	51	51	**32.7**	.466	**.434**	.667	7.4	1.2	.6	**3.0**	**14.9**
2001–02	Dallas	27	25	29.1	.437	.305	.761	7.4	1.1	**.9**	2.2	10.8
2002–03	Dallas	69	43	23.3	**.518**	.405	.682	4.8	.8	.5	1.3	9.3
2003–04	Boston	17	1	19.3	.460	.200	.769	4.6	**1.4**	.5	.8	7.8
2004–05	Boston	80	**80**	27.5	.496	.364	**.811**	6.9	1.2	.5	1.2	11.1
2005–06	Boston	**82***	63	24.8	.431	.392	.680	5.0	**1.4**	.4	.9	7.8
2006–07	Portland	27	9	13.0	.382	.087	.769	2.6	.3	.3	.4	3.7
2007–08	Portland	39	0	7.5	.443	.000	.579	1.7	.2	.3	.4	1.7
Career		563	438	25.8	.466	.363	.711	6.1	1.1	.5	1.6	10.1

==== Playoffs ====
Year	Team	GP	GS	MPG	FG%	3P%	FT%	RPG	APG	SPG	BPG	PPG
2002	Dallas	8	8	**30.6**	**.500**	.333	.545	**7.6**	.6	.3	**2.8**	**11.3**
2003	Dallas	**20**	**16**	24.6	.433	.200	**.842**	4.4	.3	.6	2.2	8.0
2005	Boston	7	7	26.4	.390	**.500**	.800	4.9	**1.1**	**.9**	1.7	6.9
Career		35	31	26.3	.446	.297	.750	5.2	.5	.5	2.2	8.5

=== College ===
Year	Team	GP	GS	MPG	FG%	3P%	FT%	RPG	APG	SPG	BPG	PPG
1994–95	Kansas	31	31	23.6	.534	.400	.637	9.7	7.5	.5	.3	11.4
1995–96	Kansas	34	34	27.0	.543	.286	.661	8.2	.4	**.9**	.8	13.4
1996–97	Kansas	**36**	**36**	28.9	**.584**	.167	**.761**	9.3	.7	**.9**	1.3	18.5
1997–98	Kansas	30	30	**30.2**	.548	**.471**	.738	**11.4**	**1.0**	**.9**	**1.5**	**19.8**
Career		131	131	27.5	.555	.371	.712	9.1	0.7	0.7	1.1	15.8

== See also ==
- List of NCAA Division I men's basketball players with 2000 points and 1000 rebounds
