= Johnny Newman =

American basketball player (born 1963)

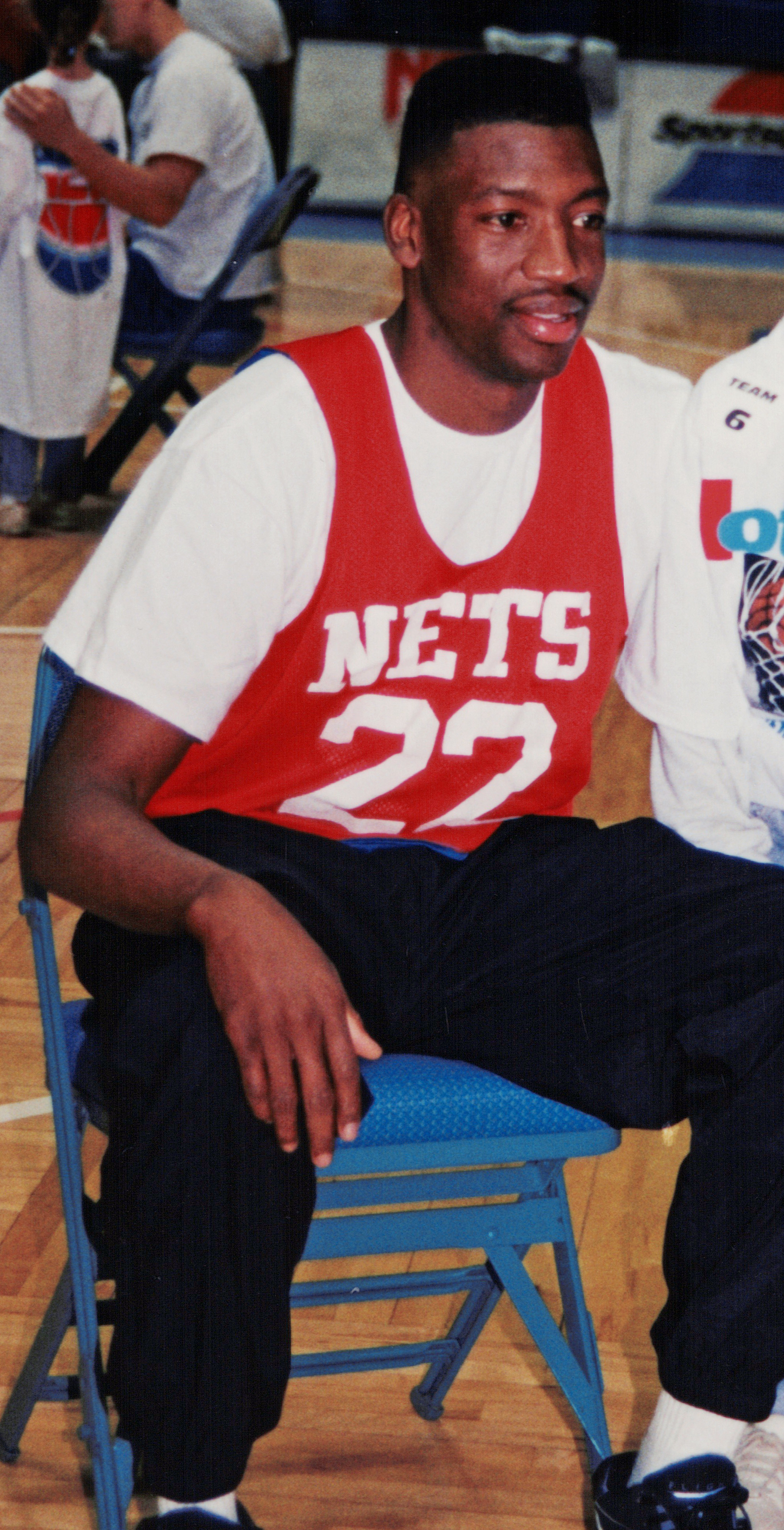
- Newman with the New Jersey Nets circa 1993/1994

Personal information
- Born: November 28, 1963 (age 62) Danville, Virginia, U.S.
- Listed height: 6 ft 7 in (2.01 m)
- Listed weight: 210 lb (95 kg)

Career information
- High school: George Washington (Danville, Virginia)
- College: Richmond (1982–1986)
- NBA draft: 1986: 2nd round, 29th overall pick
- Drafted by: Cleveland Cavaliers
- Playing career: 1986–2003
- Position: Small forward / shooting guard
- Number: 22, 4, 20, 2

Career history
- 1986–1987: Cleveland Cavaliers
- 1987–1990: New York Knicks
- 1990–1993: Charlotte Hornets
- 1993–1994: New Jersey Nets
- 1994–1997: Milwaukee Bucks
- 1997–1998: Denver Nuggets
- 1999: Cleveland Cavaliers
- 1999–2001: New Jersey Nets
- 2001–2002: Dallas Mavericks
- 2002–2003: Panionios

Career highlights
- CAA Player of the Year (1984); 3× First-team All-CAA (1984–1986); No. 20 retired by Richmond Spiders

Career NBA statistics
- Points: 12,740 (11.0 ppg)
- Rebounds: 2,536 (2.2 rpg)
- Assists: 1,688 (1.5 apg)
- Stats at NBA.com
- Stats at Basketball Reference

John Sylvester Newman Jr. (born November 28, 1963) is an American former professional basketball player. A 6' 7" and 210 lb (95 kg) swingman, Newman starred at the University of Richmond, before going on to play in the National Basketball Association (NBA). In his sixteen seasons (1986–2002) in the NBA, he was a member of the Cleveland Cavaliers, New York Knicks, Charlotte Hornets, New Jersey Nets, Milwaukee Bucks, Denver Nuggets, and Dallas Mavericks.

== Amateur career ==
Born in Danville, Virginia, Newman attended George Washington High School in Danville, playing for the Eagles under local Hall of Fame coach Harry Johnson before going on to play college basketball at Richmond. Newman is a member of the Kappa Alpha Psi fraternity.

Newman graduated from Richmond in 1986 as the school's all-time leader in points with 2,383. He was known as an expert marksman in college, with a .532 career field goal percentage and .800 career free throw percentage mark.

Newman led Richmond twice to the NCAA Tournament. In the 1984 Tournament, Newman and the underdog, 12th-seeded Richmond Spiders upset the 5th-seeded Auburn Tigers, led by future Basketball Hall-of-Famer Charles Barkley, in the first round. They fell to the 4th-seeded Indiana Hoosiers in the 2nd round. In the 1986 NCAA Tournament, Richmond was seeded 11th in the East region and lost in the first round to 6th-seeded Saint Joseph's.

After college, Newman was selected by the Cleveland Cavaliers in the 2nd round, with the 29th overall pick, of the 1986 NBA draft.

== Professional career ==
The Cleveland Cavaliers' group of selections in the 1986 NBA Draft was one of the best ever for the franchise, and among the best for any team. In that draft, the Cavaliers acquired the rights to future All-Stars Mark Price, Brad Daugherty, and Ron Harper. Since Harper and Newman played the same position, Newman was forced to ride the bench during his rookie season.

Newman joined the New York Knicks for the 1987–1988 season, and slowly worked his way into the starting lineup. Along with teammates Mark Jackson and Patrick Ewing, Newman lead the Knicks into the playoffs and averaged 19.0 ppg (including 34 points in game 3) in an opening round loss to the Boston Celtics. In 1988–89, Newman further grew into his role in the starting five. He averaged 16.0 ppg and led the Knicks to the NBA's Atlantic Division title.

After the 1989–90 season, Newman signed as a free agent with the Charlotte Hornets, an expansion franchise in its 3rd year of existence.

Newman was traded by the New Jersey Nets along with Stephon Marbury after the 2000–01 NBA season in exchange for Jason Kidd.

Newman scored 12,740 points in his NBA career.

Newman was inducted into the Virginia Sports Hall of Fame in 2011.

== NBA career statistics ==
Legend
GP	Games played	GS	Games started	MPG	Minutes per game
FG%	Field goal percentage	3P%	3-point field goal percentage	FT%	Free throw percentage
RPG	Rebounds per game	APG	Assists per game	SPG	Steals per game
BPG	Blocks per game	PPG	Points per game	**Bold**	Career high
*	Led the league

=== Regular season ===
Year	Team	GP	GS	MPG	FG%	3P%	FT%	RPG	APG	SPG	BPG	PPG
1986–87	Cleveland	59	0	10.7	.411	.045	**.868**	1.2	.5	.3	.1	5.0
1987–88	New York	77	25	20.6	.435	.280	.841	2.1	.8	.9	.1	10.0
1988–89	New York	81	80	28.8	.475	.338	.815	2.5	2.0	**1.4**	**.3**	16.0
1989–90	New York	80	69	28.5	.476	.317	.799	2.4	2.3	1.2	**.3**	12.9
1990–91	Charlotte	81	81	30.6	.470	.357	.809	3.1	2.3	1.2	.2	**16.9**
1991–92	Charlotte	55	55	30.0	.477	.283	.766	**3.3**	**2.7**	1.3	**.3**	15.3
1992–93	Charlotte	64	27	23.0	**.522**	.267	.808	2.2	1.8	.7	**.3**	11.9
1993–94	Charlotte	18	18	23.8	.523	.250	.814	3.2	1.6	1.0	**.3**	13.0
1993–94	New Jersey	63	0	20.1	.453	.270	.807	1.9	.7	.8	**.3**	9.5
1994–95	Milwaukee	**82***	11	23.1	.463	.352	.801	2.1	1.1	.8	.2	7.7
1995–96	Milwaukee	**82**	**82***	**32.8**	.495	.377	.802	2.4	1.9	1.1	.2	10.8
1996–97	Milwaukee	**82**	4	25.1	.450	.347	.765	2.3	1.4	.9	.2	8.7
1997–98	Denver	74	15	29.4	.431	.343	.820	1.9	1.9	1.0	**.3**	14.7
1998–99	Cleveland	50*	2	19.0	.422	.377	.810	1.5	.8	.6	.2	6.1
1999–2000	New Jersey	**82**	9	21.5	.446	.379	.838	1.9	.8	.6	.1	10.0
2000–01	New Jersey	**82**	17	25.0	.419	.335	.855	2.1	1.4	.8	.1	10.9
2001–02	Dallas	47	17	15.4	.453	**.386**	.724	1.0	.3	.6	.1	4.2
Career		1,159	512	24.5	.461	.336	.810	2.2	1.5	.9	.2	11.0

=== Playoffs ===
Year	Team	GP	GS	MPG	FG%	3P%	FT%	RPG	APG	SPG	BPG	PPG
1988	New York	4	2	28.3	.456	.000	**.875**	**2.8**	1.8	**1.5**	.3	**19.0**
1989	New York	9	**9**	**28.7**	.467	.250	.776	**2.8**	1.9	.9	.1	16.1
1990	New York	**10**	0	23.1	.447	**.400**	.755	2.1	1.0	.9	.3	11.7
1993	Charlotte	9	9	19.2	**.509**	.200	.688	2.1	**2.0**	1.1	.1	7.6
1994	New Jersey	4	0	13.5	.231	.250	.714	1.3	.5	.5	**.5**	3.0
2002	Dallas	3	2	7.3	.143	.167	–	.0	.7	.0	.0	1.0
Career		39	22	21.8	.451	.226	.766	2.1	1.4	.9	.2	10.8

== Personal life ==
He married actress and activist Dawnn Lewis in 2004. In 2005, he was convicted of domestic assault and battery following an incident on September 3. Newman was sentenced to 60 days in jail and fined $500 for assaulting his wife.

Newman's cousin, Buck Jenkins, played college basketball for the Columbia Lions.

== Filmography ==
Played in the 1997 film Shadow Conspiracy with Charlie Sheen, Linda Hamilton, Donald Sutherland and Gore Vidal.
