= 2001–02 Dallas Mavericks season =

Mavericks' 22nd NBA season

- Head coach: Don Nelson
- President: Donnie Nelson
- General manager: Don Nelson
- Owner: Mark Cuban
- Arena: American Airlines Center

Results
- Record: 57–25 (.695)
- Place: Division: 2nd (Midwest); Conference: 4th (Western)
- Playoff finish: Conference semifinals (lost to Kings 1–4)
- Stats at Basketball Reference

Local media
- Television: KTXA; KTVT; Fox Sports Net Southwest
- Radio: KRLD

The 2001–02 Dallas Mavericks season was the 22nd season for the Dallas Mavericks in the National Basketball Association.

== Season summary ==
=== Off-season ===
For the season, the Mavericks moved into their new arena known as the American Airlines Center. During the off-season, the team acquired All-Star point guard Tim Hardaway from the Miami Heat, and signed free agents Adrian Griffin, Johnny Newman, and Danny Manning.

For the season, the Mavericks redesigned their primary logo, replacing the colors blue and green with dark navy blue, light blue, silver and black to their color scheme of white. The team's primary logo featured a white horse with a black shadow and silver mane, in front of a light blue basketball with black seams, and a white circle with a black outline featuring the city name "Dallas" in black letters. Underneath the horse featured the team name "Mavericks" in black letters with a white outline in front of a blue rectangle; the primary logo is in front of a silver shield with black and white outlines, and a white star with a black outline below the team name.

The team also redesigned their home and road uniforms, which featured a V-shaped collar and the city name "Dallas" on the front of their jerseys; the uniforms also featured a light blue trim, side panels on the top of their jerseys and shorts along with outlines, and their new alternate logo of a white horse head in front of a light blue basketball on both sides of their shorts. The white home uniforms featured dark navy blue side panels and light blue outlines, while the road uniforms were changed from blue to dark navy blue, and featured light blue side panels and white outlines.

The team's new home uniforms would remain in use until 2014, while the new road uniforms would last until 2010; the team's new primary logo is still present as of 2026.

=== Regular season ===
With the addition of Hardaway and Griffin, the Mavericks continued to play solid basketball posting a 10-game winning streak between December and January. The team posted a seven-game winning streak in January, and later on held a 35–14 record at the All-Star break. At mid-season, the Mavericks traded Hardaway, Juwan Howard, and second-year forward Donnell Harvey to the Denver Nuggets in exchange for Nick Van Exel, Raef LaFrentz, Tariq Abdul-Wahad and Avery Johnson. The Mavericks finished in second place in the Midwest Division with a 57–25 record, earning the fourth seed in the Western Conference, and qualifying for the NBA playoffs in back-to-back seasons for the first time since the 1987–88 season.

Dirk Nowitzki averaged 23.4 points and 9.9 rebounds per game, contributed 139 three-point field goals, and was named to the All-NBA Second Team, while Michael Finley averaged 20.6 points and 5.2 rebounds per game, and Steve Nash provided the team with 17.9 points and 7.7 assists per game, led them with 156 three-point field goals, and was named to the All-NBA Third Team. In addition, and in 27 games after the trade, Van Exel contributed 13.2 points and 4.2 assists per game, while LaFrentz provided with 10.8 points, 7.4 rebounds and 2.2 blocks per game. Meanwhile, Griffin averaged 7.2 points and 1.3 steals per game, second-year forward Eduardo Nájera provided with 6.5 points and 5.5 rebounds per game, and Greg Buckner contributed 5.8 points per game.

During the NBA All-Star weekend at the First Union Center in Philadelphia, Pennsylvania, Nowitzki and Nash were both selected for the 2002 NBA All-Star Game, as members of the Western Conference All-Star team, while head coach Don Nelson was selected to coach the Western Conference; it was the first ever All-Star appearance for both Nowitzki and Nash. In addition, Nash also participated in the NBA Three-Point Shootout for the second consecutive year. Nowitzki also finished in eighth place in Most Valuable Player voting, while Nash finished in 14th place; Nash also finished in third place in Most Improved Player voting.

The Mavericks finished sixth in the NBA in home-game attendance, with an attendance of 802,783 at the American Airlines Center during the regular season.

=== NBA playoffs ===
In the Western Conference First Round of the 2002 NBA playoffs, the Mavericks faced off against the 5th–seeded Minnesota Timberwolves, who were led by All-Star forward Kevin Garnett, All-Star forward Wally Szczerbiak, and Chauncey Billups. The Mavericks won the first two games over the Timberwolves at home at the American Airlines Center, before winning Game 3 on the road, 115–102 at the Target Center to win the series in a three-game sweep.

In the Western Conference Semi-finals, the team faced off against the top–seeded, and Pacific Division champion Sacramento Kings, who were led by the trio of All-Star forward Chris Webber, All-Star forward Peja Stojaković, and Mike Bibby. The Mavericks lost Game 1 to the Kings on the road, 108–91 at the ARCO Arena II, but managed to win Game 2 on the road, 110–102 to even the series. However, the Mavericks lost their next two home games at the American Airlines Center, before losing Game 5 to the Kings at the ARCO Arena II, 114–101, thus losing the series in five games.

=== Aftermath ===
Following the season, Buckner signed as a free agent with the Philadelphia 76ers, while Newman retired, and Manning was released to free agency, and signed with the Detroit Pistons midway through the following season.

== Offseason ==
=== Draft picks ===
Round	Pick	Player	Position	Nationality	College
2	43	Kyle Hill	PG/SG	United States	Eastern Illinois
2	53	Kenny Satterfield	PG	United States	Cincinnati

== Roster ==
2001–02 Dallas Mavericks roster
Players

Pos.	No.	Player	Height	Weight	DOB	From
G/F	9	Tariq Abdul-Wahad	6 ft 6 in (1.98 m)	223 lb (101 kg)	1974–11–03	San José State
C	44	Shawn Bradley	7 ft 6 in (2.29 m)	235 lb (107 kg)	1972–03–22	BYU
G	21	Greg Buckner	6 ft 4 in (1.93 m)	210 lb (95 kg)	1976–09–16	Clemson
C	42	Evan Eschmeyer	6 ft 11 in (2.11 m)	255 lb (116 kg)	1975–05–30	Northwestern
G/F	4	Michael Finley	6 ft 7 in (2.01 m)	225 lb (102 kg)	1973–03–06	Wisconsin
G/F	7	Adrian Griffin	6 ft 5 in (1.96 m)	217 lb (98 kg)	1974–07–04	Seton Hall
G	5	Avery Johnson	5 ft 10 in (1.78 m)	185 lb (84 kg)	1965–03–25	Southern
F/C	45	Raef LaFrentz	7 ft 0 in (2.13 m)	240 lb (109 kg)	1976–05–29	Kansas
F	6	Danny Manning	6 ft 10 in (2.08 m)	230 lb (104 kg)	1966–05–17	Kansas
F	14	Eduardo Nájera	6 ft 8 in (2.03 m)	235 lb (107 kg)	1976–07–11	Oklahoma
G	13	Steve Nash	6 ft 3 in (1.91 m)	180 lb (82 kg)	1974–02–07	Santa Clara
F	2	Johnny Newman	6 ft 7 in (2.01 m)	190 lb (86 kg)	1963–11–28	Richmond
F/C	41	Dirk Nowitzki	7 ft 0 in (2.13 m)	245 lb (111 kg)	1978–06–19	Germany
G	31	Nick Van Exel	6 ft 1 in (1.85 m)	170 lb (77 kg)	1971–11–27	Cincinnati
C	16	Wang Zhizhi	7 ft 1 in (2.16 m)	284 lb (129 kg)	1977–07–08	China

Coaches
Head coach
- Don Nelson
Assistant(s)
- Rolando Blackman
- Brad Davis (player development)
- Del Harris
- Sidney Moncrief
- Donnie Nelson
- Charlie Parker

Legend
- (DP) Unsigned draft pick
- (FA) Free agent
- (S) Suspended
- Injured

Roster
Updated: February 21, 2002

=== Roster notes ===
- Center Shawn Bradley holds both American and German citizenship.

== Regular season ==
=== Season standings ===
Midwest Division	W	L	PCT	GB	Home	Road	Div
y-San Antonio Spurs	58	24	.707	–	32–9	26–15	21–3
x-Dallas Mavericks	57	25	.695	1	30–11	27–14	16–8
x-Minnesota Timberwolves	50	32	.610	8	29–12	21–20	15–9
x-Utah Jazz	44	38	.537	14	25–16	19–22	8–16
e-Houston Rockets	28	54	.341	30	18–23	10–31	9–15
e-Denver Nuggets	27	55	.329	31	20–21	7–34	8–16
e-Memphis Grizzlies	23	59	.280	35	15–26	8–33	7–17

#	Western Conference				
#	Team	W	L	PCT	GB
1	z-Sacramento Kings	61	21	.744	–
2	y-San Antonio Spurs	58	24	.707	3
3	x-Los Angeles Lakers	58	24	.707	3
4	x-Dallas Mavericks	57	25	.695	4
5	x-Minnesota Timberwolves	50	32	.610	11
6	x-Portland Trail Blazers	49	33	.598	12
7	x-Seattle SuperSonics	45	37	.549	16
8	x-Utah Jazz	44	38	.537	17
9	e-Los Angeles Clippers	39	43	.476	22
10	e-Phoenix Suns	36	46	.439	25
11	e-Houston Rockets	28	54	.341	33
12	e-Denver Nuggets	27	55	.329	34
13	e-Memphis Grizzlies	23	59	.280	38
14	e-Golden State Warriors	21	61	.256	40

z – clinched division title
y – clinched division title
x – clinched playoff spot

=== Game log ===
2001–02 game log
Total: 57–25 (home: 30–11; road: 27–14)
October: 1–0 (home: 1–0; road: 0–0)

Game	Date	Team	Score	High points	High rebounds	High assists	Location Attendance	Record
1	October 30	Detroit	W 94–87	Michael Finley (34)	Juwan Howard (10)	Steve Nash (11)	American Airlines Center; 19,200	1–0

November : 9–6 (home: 4–3; road: 5–3)

Game	Date	Team	Score	High points	High rebounds	High assists	Location Attendance	Record
2	November 1	@ Philadelphia	W 99–92	Dirk Nowitzki (30)	Dirk Nowitzki (13)	Tim Hardaway (7)	First Union Center; 20,230	2–0
3	November 2	@ Toronto	L 92–109	Finley, Hardaway (17)	Juwan Howard (11)	Nash, Hardaway (5)	Air Canada Centre; 19,800	2–1
4	November 4	@ Memphis	W 94–85	Juwan Howard (36)	Danny Manning (11)	Finley, Hardaway (5)	Pyramid Arena; 13,177	3–1
5	November 6	Charlotte	W 110–92	Dirk Nowitzki (34)	Dirk Nowitzki (10)	Steve Nash (6)	American Airlines Center; 16,905	4–1
6	November 8	Denver	W 105–91	Dirk Nowitzki (33)	Eduardo Nájera (10)	Steve Nash (12)	American Airlines Center; 17,471	5–1
7	November 10	Philadelphia	L 91–98	Dirk Nowitzki (25)	Nowitzki, Howard (10)	Steve Nash (10)	American Airlines Center; 19,857	5–2
8	November 14	@ Cleveland	W 107–94	Dirk Nowitzki (28)	Juwan Howard (10)	Steve Nash (12)	Gund Arena; 12,414	6–2
9	November 15	@ Detroit	L 89–115	Michael Finley (19)	Juwan Howard (8)	Nash, Martin (3)	The Palace of Auburn Hills; 13,445	6–3
10	November 17	@ Houston	L 87–124	Steve Nash (21)	Greg Buckner (10)	Nash, Finley (4)	Compaq Center; 11,978	6–4
11	November 20	Seattle	L 97–105	Michael Finley (26)	Juwan Howard (13)	Nash, Nowitzki (6)	American Airlines Center; 18,949	6–5
12	November 21	@ Charlotte	W 89–78	Michael Finley (22)	Dirk Nowitzki (11)	Steve Nash (6)	Charlotte Coliseum; 8,932	7–5
13	November 23	@ Miami	W 104–94	Dirk Nowitzki (33)	Dirk Nowitzki (11)	Steve Nash (9)	American Airlines Arena; 15,486	8–5
14	November 24	Phoenix	W 119–104	Dirk Nowitzki (32)	Juwan Howard (13)	Steve Nash (9)	American Airlines Center; 19,869	9–5
15	November 27	Golden State	W 116–106	Michael Finley (39)	three players tied (7)	Steve Nash (9)	American Airlines Center; 17,110	10–5
16	November 29	Sacramento	L 98–110	Dirk Nowitzki (29)	Dirk Nowitzki (11)	Steve Nash (8)	American Airlines Center; 18,384	10–6

December : 11–3 (home: 7–1; road: 4–2)

Game	Date	Team	Score	High points	High rebounds	High assists	Location Attendance	Record
17	December 1	@ Golden State	W 111–82	Dirk Nowitzki (21)	Michael Finley (10)	Steve Nash (8)	The Arena in Oakland; 14,122	11–6
18	December 2	@ Sacramento	W 120–114 (OT)	Dirk Nowitzki (32)	Dirk Nowitzki (14)	Michael Finley (7)	ARCO Arena; 17,317	12–6
19	December 5	@ L.A. Lakers	L 94–98	Dirk Nowitzki (33)	Dirk Nowitzki (14)	Steve Nash (13)	Staples Center; 18,997	12–7
20	December 8	Washington	L 95–102	Michael Finley (32)	Juwan Howard (6)	Steve Nash (10)	American Airlines Center; 20,241	12–8
21	December 10	@ Utah	L 98–107	Dirk Nowitzki (27)	Dirk Nowitzki (10)	Steve Nash (8)	Delta Center; 18,097	12–9
22	December 11	Portland	W 105–103	Steve Nash (39)	Nájera, Howard (9)	Steve Nash (7)	American Airlines Center; 17,029	13–9
23	December 13	Cleveland	W 102–82	Michael Finley (22)	Adrian Griffin (11)	Nash, Hardaway (7)	American Airlines Center; 17,408	14–9
24	December 15	Minnesota	W 125–117	Michael Finley (30)	Dirk Nowitzki (15)	Steve Nash (7)	American Airlines Center; 19,485	15–9
25	December 18	@ Minnesota	W 107–103	Michael Finley (26)	Dirk Nowitzki (15)	Finley, Nash (5)	Target Center; 17,079	16–9
26	December 20	Milwaukee	W 113–101	Finley, Nash (33)	Dirk Nowitzki (12)	Finley, Nash (8)	American Airlines Center; 19,780	17–9
27	December 22	Orlando	W 102–80	Tim Hardaway (18)	Eduardo Nájera (10)	Nash, Hardaway (5)	American Airlines Center; 19,920	18–9
28	December 26	@ San Antonio	W 126–123 (OT)	Michael Finley (28)	Dirk Nowitzki (11)	Michael Finley (6)	Alamodome; 20,667	19–9
29	December 27	Chicago	W 89–74	Dirk Nowitzki (24)	Eduardo Nájera (14)	Steve Nash (14)	American Airlines Center; 20,018	20–9
30	December 29	Atlanta	W 113–97	Dirk Nowitzki (35)	Dirk Nowitzki (12)	Steve Nash (10)	American Airlines Center; 20,032	21–9

January : 12–4 (home: 6–2; road: 6–2)

Game	Date	Team	Score	High points	High rebounds	High assists	Location Attendance	Record
31	January 2	@ Chicago	W 107–97	Steve Nash (24)	Dirk Nowitzki (8)	Steve Nash (11)	United Center; 17,824	22–9
32	January 3	@ New York	L 101–108 (OT)	Dirk Nowitzki (30)	Dirk Nowitzki (16)	Nash, Hardaway (7)	Madison Square Garden; 19,763	22–10
33	January 5	San Antonio	L 103–105	Dirk Nowitzki (28)	Dirk Nowitzki (14)	Nash, Hardaway (6)	American Airlines Center; 20,123	22–11
34	January 8	Denver	W 95–94	Dirk Nowitzki (27)	Juwan Howard (9)	Steve Nash (8)	American Airlines Center; 19,617	23–11
35	January 10	New York	W 111–89	Dirk Nowitzki (29)	Dirk Nowitzki (13)	Steve Nash (11)	American Airlines Center; 20,019	24–11
36	January 12	Indiana	W 111–102	Dirk Nowitzki (31)	Dirk Nowitzki (11)	Steve Nash (11)	American Airlines Center; 20,071	25–11
37	January 14	@ Orlando	L 87–113	Juwan Howard (26)	Juwan Howard (8)	Tim Hardaway (4)	TD Waterhouse Centre; 13,237	25–12
38	January 15	@ Atlanta	W 116–107	Dirk Nowitzki (40)	Dirk Nowitzki (11)	Steve Nash (10)	Philips Arena; 8,214	26–12
39	January 17	@ Memphis	W 108–97	Dirk Nowitzki (32)	Greg Buckner (9)	Steve Nash (10)	Pyramid Arena; 12,732	27–12
40	January 19	Utah	W 106–103	Dirk Nowitzki (34)	Buckner, Nájera (9)	Steve Nash (9)	American Airlines Center; 20,146	28–12
41	January 21	New Jersey	W 113–105	Dirk Nowitzki (39)	Dirk Nowitzki (13)	Tim Hardaway (6)	American Airlines Center; 20,039	29–12
42	January 22	@ Houston	W 113–107	Steve Nash (31)	Juwan Howard (13)	Steve Nash (10)	Compaq Center; 11,030	30–12
43	January 24	@ Denver	W 104–97	Dirk Nowitzki (26)	Juwan Howard (13)	Tim Hardaway (6)	Pepsi Center; 16,045	31–12
44	January 26	@ L.A. Clippers	W 133–112	Dirk Nowitzki (28)	Nowitzki, Howard (7)	Steve Nash (11)	Staples Center; 19,311	32–12
45	January 29	L.A. Clippers	L 100–117	Nowitzki, Nash (22)	Adrian Griffin (10)	Tim Hardaway (7)	American Airlines Center; 19,948	32–13
46	January 31	Houston	W 95–91	Steve Nash (33)	Juwan Howard (16)	Steve Nash (8)	American Airlines Center; 19,939	33–13

February : 7–4 (home: 3–2; road: 4–2)

Game	Date	Team	Score	High points	High rebounds	High assists	Location Attendance	Record
47	February 3	L.A. Lakers	L 94–101	Steve Nash (20)	Dirk Nowitzki (15)	Steve Nash (6)	American Airlines Center; 20,179	33–14
48	February 5	@ Indiana	W 141–140 (2OT)	Dirk Nowitzki (38)	Dirk Nowitzki (17)	Steve Nash (10)	Conseco Fieldhouse; 15,530	34–14
49	February 6	@ New Jersey	W 112–100	Dirk Nowitzki (22)	Dirk Nowitzki (9)	Steve Nash (12)	Continental Airlines Arena; 16,179	35–14
All-Star Break
50	February 12	@ Seattle	W 112–106	Steve Nash (28)	Dirk Nowitzki (9)	Steve Nash (8)	KeyArena; 14,405	36–14
51	February 13	@ Portland	L 103–114	Dirk Nowitzki (27)	Dirk Nowitzki (8)	Steve Nash (7)	Rose Garden Arena; 19,341	36–15
52	February 16	@ L.A. Clippers	L 110–119	Michael Finley (23)	Dirk Nowitzki (10)	Steve Nash (8)	Staples Center; 19,120	36–16
53	February 17	@ Phoenix	W 105–92	Dirk Nowitzki (20)	Dirk Nowitzki (10)	Steve Nash (6)	America West Arena; 16,809	37–16
54	February 19	Minnesota	L 100–117	Steve Nash (24)	Dirk Nowitzki (12)	Nowitzki, Hardaway (5)	American Airlines Center; 20,035	37–17
55	February 21	Boston	W 98–92	Dirk Nowitzki (33)	Dirk Nowitzki (23)	Dirk Nowitzki (8)	American Airlines Center; 20,013	38–17
56	February 23	Sacramento	W 111–97	Steve Nash (28)	Dirk Nowitzki (21)	Nash, Van Exel (8)	American Airlines Center; 20,181	39–17
57	February 26	Memphis	W 104–91	Michael Finley (30)	Dirk Nowitzki (9)	Michael Finley (8)	American Airlines Center; 19,970	40–17

March : 11–5 (home: 6–2; road: 5–3)

Game	Date	Team	Score	High points	High rebounds	High assists	Location Attendance	Record
58	March 2	Miami	L 95–109	Michael Finley (25)	Finley, Nájera (7)	Steve Nash (7)	American Airlines Center; 17,317	40–18
59	March 3	@ Denver	W 116–110 (OT)	Michael Finley (30)	Dirk Nowitzki (10)	Steve Nash (9)	Pepsi Center; 16,851	41–18
60	March 5	Phoenix	W 81–77	Dirk Nowitzki (30)	Dirk Nowitzki (20)	Steve Nash (9)	American Airlines Center; 19,745	42–18
61	March 7	Toronto	W 122–103	Dirk Nowitzki (35)	Eduardo Nájera (7)	Steve Nash (15)	American Airlines Center; 19,945	43–18
62	March 9	Golden State	W 107–105	Michael Finley (28)	Dirk Nowitzki (11)	Steve Nash (8)	American Airlines Center; 20,170	44–18
63	March 11	Seattle	W 119–108	Michael Finley (26)	Dirk Nowitzki (12)	Steve Nash (9)	American Airlines Center; 20,090	45–18
64	March 14	@ Portland	L 106–132	Dirk Nowitzki (19)	Bradley, Nájera (5)	Avery Johnson (7)	Rose Garden Arena; 19,980	45–19
65	March 16	@ Golden State	W 117–100	Nowitzki, LaFrentz (30)	Nowitzki, Buckner (9)	Steve Nash (9)	The Arena in Oakland; 16,423	46–19
66	March 17	@ L.A. Lakers	L 103–105	Michael Finley (21)	Finley, Nowitzki (10)	Nick Van Exel (5)	Staples Center; 18,997	46–20
67	March 19	L.A. Lakers	W 114–98	Steve Nash (30)	Raef LaFrentz (13)	Steve Nash (5)	American Airlines Center; 20,112	47–20
68	March 21	San Antonio	L 102–105	Dirk Nowitzki (29)	Dirk Nowitzki (14)	Steve Nash (7)	American Airlines Center; 20,133	47–21
69	March 23	Memphis	W 111–100	Dirk Nowitzki (24)	Eduardo Nájera (9)	Avery Johnson (6)	American Airlines Center; 20,184	48–21
70	March 26	@ Milwaukee	W 112–106 (OT)	Michael Finley (36)	Dirk Nowitzki (14)	Steve Nash (13)	Bradley Center; 18,465	49–21
71	March 28	@ Minnesota	L 111–113	Dirk Nowitzki (34)	Nowitzki, Bradley (8)	Steve Nash (8)	Target Center; 19,668	49–22
72	March 29	@ Boston	W 108–82	Michael Finley (24)	Raef LaFrentz (13)	Steve Nash (9)	FleetCenter; 18,624	50–22
73	March 31	@ Washington	W 110–103	Dirk Nowitzki (23)	Nowitzki, LaFrentz (12)	Steve Nash (12)	MCI Center; 20,674	51–22

April : 6–3 (home: 3–1; road: 3–2)

Game	Date	Team	Score	High points	High rebounds	High assists	Location Attendance	Record
74	April 4	L.A. Clippers	W 115–90	Dirk Nowitzki (25)	Evan Eschmeyer (10)	Steve Nash (7)	American Airlines Center; 20,050	52–22
75	April 6	@ San Antonio	L 87–89	Dirk Nowitzki (26)	Dirk Nowitzki (21)	Nick Van Exel (4)	Alamodome; 34,739	52–23
76	April 8	@ Utah	W 105–96	Finley, Van Exel (20)	Eduardo Nájera (9)	Nash, Van Exel (8)	Delta Center; 19,911	53–23
77	April 9	Portland	W 108–96	Michael Finley (27)	Raef LaFrentz (11)	Steve Nash (9)	American Airlines Center; 20,110	54–23
78	April 11	Houston	L 95–98 (OT)	Michael Finley (25)	Eduardo Nájera (15)	Finley, Nash (4)	American Airlines Center; 20,098	54–24
79	April 13	@ Seattle	W 116–99	Michael Finley (29)	Eduardo Nájera (11)	Nick Van Exel (4)	KeyArena; 17,072	55–24
80	April 14	@ Sacramento	W 113–100	Nick Van Exel (27)	Raef LaFrentz (13)	Steve Nash (13)	ARCO Arena; 17,317	56–24
81	April 16	Utah	W 96–87	Michael Finley (35)	Raef LaFrentz (10)	Steve Nash (7)	American Airlines Center; 20,068	57–24
82	April 17	@ Phoenix	L 76–89	Wang Zhizhi (12)	Evan Eschmeyer (7)	three players tied (3)	America West Arena; 19,023	57–25

2001–02 schedule

== Playoffs ==
2002 playoff game log
First round: 3–0 (home: 2–0; road: 1–0)

Game	Date	Team	Score	High points	High rebounds	High assists	Location Attendance	Series
1	April 21	@ Minnesota	W 101–94	Dirk Nowitzki (30)	Dirk Nowitzki (15)	Nick Van Exel (7)	American Airlines Center; 20,010	1–0
2	April 24	@ Minnesota	W 122–110	Dirk Nowitzki (31)	Dirk Nowitzki (15)	Steve Nash (10)	American Airlines Center; 20,084	2–0
3	April 28	Minnesota	W 115–102	Dirk Nowitzki (39)	Dirk Nowitzki (17)	Steve Nash (11)	Target Center; 18,795	3–0

Conference Semi-finals: 1–4 (home: 0–2; road: 1–2)

Game	Date	Team	Score	High points	High rebounds	High assists	Location Attendance	Series
1	May 4	@ Sacramento	L 91–108	Dirk Nowitzki (23)	Dirk Nowitzki (14)	Steve Nash (5)	ARCO Arena; 17,317	0–1
2	May 6	@ Sacramento	W 110–102	Steve Nash (30)	Dirk Nowitzki (15)	Steve Nash (8)	ARCO Arena; 17,317	1–1
3	May 9	Sacramento	L 119–125	Michael Finley (37)	Raef LaFrentz (13)	Steve Nash (5)	American Airlines Center; 20,265	1–2
4	May 11	Sacramento	L 113–115 (OT)	Dirk Nowitzki (31)	Dirk Nowitzki (12)	Dirk Nowitzki (7)	American Airlines Center; 20,274	1–3
5	May 13	@ Sacramento	L 101–114	Dirk Nowitzki (32)	Dirk Nowitzki (12)	Steve Nash (9)	ARCO Arena; 17,317	1–4

2002 schedule

== Player statistics ==
=== Regular season ===
Player	POS	GP	GS	MP	REB	AST	STL	BLK	PTS	MPG	RPG	APG	SPG	BPG	PPG
Steve Nash	PG	82	82	2,837	254	634	53	4	1,466	34.6	3.1	7.7	.6	.0	17.9
Dirk Nowitzki	C	76	76	2,891	755	186	83	77	1,779	38.0	9.9	2.4	1.1	1.0	23.4
Michael Finley	SF	69	69	2,754	360	230	65	25	1,424	39.9	5.2	3.3	.9	.4	20.6
Eduardo Nájera	PF	62	11	1,357	342	38	56	30	400	21.9	5.5	.6	.9	.5	6.5
Adrian Griffin	SG	58	34	1,383	229	106	75	12	415	23.8	3.9	1.8	1.3	.2	7.2
Wang Zhizhi	C	55	0	600	111	22	11	18	308	10.9	2.0	.4	.2	.3	5.6
Tim Hardaway^{†}	PG	54	2	1,276	97	201	40	8	518	23.6	1.8	3.7	.7	.1	9.6
Juwan Howard^{†}	PF	53	44	1,659	390	93	28	30	684	31.3	7.4	1.8	.5	.6	12.9
Shawn Bradley	C	53	16	757	176	20	28	64	215	14.3	3.3	.4	.5	1.2	4.1
Johnny Newman	SF	47	17	724	49	14	29	4	198	15.4	1.0	.3	.6	.1	4.2
Greg Buckner	SG	44	16	885	173	48	31	19	253	20.1	3.9	1.1	.7	.4	5.8
Danny Manning	PF	41	10	552	108	30	21	21	165	13.5	2.6	.7	.5	.5	4.0
Evan Eschmeyer	C	31	6	299	98	9	10	9	62	9.6	3.2	.3	.3	.3	2.0
Raef LaFrentz^{†}	C	27	25	787	200	29	24	60	292	29.1	7.4	1.1	.9	2.2	10.8
Nick Van Exel^{†}	SG	27	2	757	85	113	14	4	357	28.0	3.1	4.2	.5	.1	13.2
Donnell Harvey^{†}	PF	18	0	162	46	5	4	5	38	9.0	2.6	.3	.2	.3	2.1
Avery Johnson^{†}	PG	17	0	152	5	28	5	1	54	8.9	.3	1.6	.3	.1	3.2
Tariq Abdul-Wahad^{†}	SG	4	0	24	6	2	2	1	0	6.0	1.5	.5	.5	.3	.0
Darrick Martin	PG	3	0	22	1	3	2	0	1	7.3	.3	1.0	.7	.0	.3
Charlie Bell^{†}	SG	2	0	2	1	0	0	0	0	1.0	.5	.0	.0	.0	.0

- ^{†} Denotes player spent time with another team in the season. Stats reflect time with the Mavericks only.

=== Playoffs ===
Player	POS	GP	GS	MP	REB	AST	STL	BLK	PTS	MPG	RPG	APG	SPG	BPG	PPG
Michael Finley	SF	8	8	373	50	18	12	4	197	46.6	6.3	2.3	1.5	.5	24.6
Dirk Nowitzki	C	8	8	357	105	18	16	6	227	44.6	13.1	2.3	2.0	.8	28.4
Steve Nash	PG	8	8	323	32	70	4	0	156	40.4	4.0	8.8	.5	.0	19.5
Raef LaFrentz	C	8	8	245	61	5	2	22	90	30.6	7.6	.6	.3	2.8	11.3
Eduardo Nájera	PF	8	4	122	13	1	3	0	37	15.3	1.6	.1	.4	.0	4.6
Nick Van Exel	SG	8	1	264	24	31	8	0	89	33.0	3.0	3.9	1.0	.0	11.1
Wang Zhizhi	C	8	0	44	8	3	0	1	20	5.5	1.0	.4	.0	.1	2.5
Greg Buckner	SG	7	0	105	26	4	3	1	27	15.0	3.7	.6	.4	.1	3.9
Shawn Bradley	C	7	0	25	5	0	0	1	6	3.6	.7	.0	.0	.1	.9
Adrian Griffin	SG	4	1	57	9	4	2	1	20	14.3	2.3	1.0	.5	.3	5.0
Johnny Newman	SF	3	2	22	0	2	0	0	3	7.3	.0	.7	.0	.0	1.0
Evan Eschmeyer	C	3	0	8	2	1	0	1	0	2.7	.7	.3	.0	.3	.0

== Awards and records ==
- Dirk Nowitzki, All-NBA Second Team
- Steve Nash, All-NBA Third Team
- Dirk Nowitzki, NBA All-Star Game
- Steve Nash, NBA All-Star Game

== Transactions ==
=== Trades ===
February 21, 2002
To Dallas Mavericks----
- Avery Johnson
- Raef LaFrentz
- Nick Van Exel
To Denver Nuggets----
- Tim Hardaway
- Juwan Howard

=== Free Agents ===
Player	Signed	Former team
Danny Manning	August 2, 2001	Utah Jazz
Evan Eschmeyer	August 25, 2001	New Jersey Nets

Player Transactions Citation:

== See also ==
- 2001–02 NBA season
