= 2001–02 Sacramento Kings season =

NBA professional basketball team season

- Division champions
- Head coach: Rick Adelman
- President: Geoff Petrie
- General manager: Geoff Petrie
- Owners: Maloof family
- Arena: ARCO Arena

Results
- Record: 61–21 (.744)
- Place: Division: 1st (Pacific); Conference: 1st (Western)
- Playoff finish: Conference finals (lost to Lakers 3–4)
- Stats at Basketball Reference

Local media
- Television: KMAX-TV; Fox Sports Net Bay Area
- Radio: KHTK

The 2001–02 Sacramento Kings season was the 53rd season for the Sacramento Kings in the National Basketball Association, and their 17th season in Sacramento, California.

== Season summary ==
=== Off-season ===
During the off-season, the Kings acquired Mike Bibby from the Vancouver Grizzlies on draft day; the Grizzlies had recently relocated to Memphis.

=== Regular season ===
With the addition of Bibby, and despite Chris Webber missing the first 20 games of the regular season due to a preseason ankle injury, the Kings won 17 of their first 22 games, then posted a 12-game winning streak between December and January, as the team held a 37–12 record at the All-Star break. The Kings won 11 straight games near the end of the regular season, finishing in first place in the Pacific Division with a 61–21 record (.744 in winning percentage), the best record in the league, and earning the first seed in the Western Conference; the team won its first division title since the 1978–79 season, back when the team was known as the Kansas City Kings.

Webber averaged 24.5 points, 10.1 rebounds, 4.8 assists, 1.7 steals and 1.4 blocks per game in 54 games, and was named to the All-NBA Second Team, while Peja Stojaković averaged 21.2 points and 5.3 rebounds per game, and led the Kings with 129 three-point field goals, and Bibby provided the team with 13.7 points and 5.0 assists per game. In addition, Doug Christie averaged 12.0 points and 2.0 steals per game, and was named to the NBA All-Defensive Second Team, while Vlade Divac provided the team with 11.1 points and 8.4 rebounds per game. Off the bench, sixth man Bobby Jackson contributed 11.1 points per game, while second-year forward Hedo Türkoğlu averaged 10.1 points and 4.5 rebounds per game, Scot Pollard provided with 6.4 points, 7.1 rebounds and 1.0 blocks per game, and Lawrence Funderburke contributed 4.7 points and 3.5 rebounds per game.

During the NBA All-Star Weekend at the First Union Center in Philadelphia, Webber and Stojaković were both selected for the 2002 NBA All-Star Game, as members of the Western Conference All-Star team; it was Stojaković's first ever All-Star appearance. In addition, Stojaković also won the NBA Three-Point Shootout, while Türkoğlu was selected for the NBA Rookie Challenge Game, as a member of the Sophomores team, and rookie small forward, and first-round draft pick Gerald Wallace participated in the NBA Slam Dunk Contest. Webber also finished in seventh place in Most Valuable Player voting, while Jackson finished in second place in Sixth Man of the Year voting, behind former Kings forward Corliss Williamson of the Detroit Pistons, and head coach Rick Adelman finished in second place in Coach of the Year voting, behind Rick Carlisle of the Pistons.

The Kings finished 15th in the NBA in home-game attendance, with an attendance of 709,997 at the ARCO Arena II during the regular season.

=== NBA playoffs ===
In the Western Conference first round of the 2002 NBA playoffs, the Kings faced off against the eighth-seeded Utah Jazz, a team that featured All-Star forward Karl Malone, Donyell Marshall and John Stockton. The Kings won game 1 over the Jazz at home, 89–86 at the ARCO Arena II, before losing game 2 at home by a score of 93–86, as the Jazz evened the series. The Kings managed to win the next two games on the road, which included a game 4 win over the Jazz at the Delta Center, 91–86 to win the series in four games.

In the Western Conference semifinals, the team faced off against the fourth-seeded Dallas Mavericks, who were led by the All-Star trio of Dirk Nowitzki, Steve Nash and Michael Finley. The Kings won game 1 over the Mavericks at the ARCO Arena II, 108–91, but then lost game 2 at home, 110–102 as the Mavericks evened the series. Stojaković suffered an ankle injury in game 3, in which the Kings defeated the Mavericks on the road, 125–119 at the American Airlines Center, taking a 2–1 series lead. After winning game 4 on the road in overtime, 115–113, the Kings won game 5 over the Mavericks at the ARCO Arena II, 114–101 to win the series in five games, and advance to the conference finals for the first time since the 1980–81 season.

In their first trip to the Western Conference finals, and for the third consecutive year, the Kings faced off against the third-seeded, and two-time defending NBA champion Los Angeles Lakers, who were led by All-Star center Shaquille O'Neal, All-Star guard Kobe Bryant, and Derek Fisher. The Kings lost game 1 to the Lakers at home, 106–99 at the ARCO Arena II, but managed to win the next two games to take a 2–1 series lead. After losing game 4 on the road, 100–99 at the Staples Center, Stojaković returned to play in game 5, in which the Kings defeated the Lakers at the ARCO Arena II, 92–91 to take a 3–2 series lead. However, the Kings lost game 6 to the Lakers at the Staples Center, 106–102 which tied the series, and then lost game 7 at the ARCO Arena II in overtime, 112–106, thus losing in a hard-fought seven-game series.

The Kings–Lakers series of the Western Conference finals was one of the most controversial NBA playoff series in history; game 6 at the Staples Center was the most controversial game of the series, with the calls made by the referees against the Kings, and with the Lakers winning the game, 106–102 to even the series.

The Lakers would then go on to defeat the New Jersey Nets in a four–game sweep in the 2002 NBA Finals, winning their third consecutive NBA championship.

== Draft picks ==
Round	Pick	Player	Position	Nationality	College
1	25	Gerald Wallace	Forward	United States	Alabama
2	55	Maurice Jeffers	Guard	United States	Saint Louis

== Roster ==
2001–02 Sacramento Kings roster
Players

Pos.	No.	Player	Height	Weight	DOB	From
G	10	Mike Bibby	6 ft 1 in (1.85 m)	190 lb (86 kg)	1978–05–13	Arizona
F	52	Chucky Brown	6 ft 7 in (2.01 m)	214 lb (97 kg)	1968–02–29	NC State
G/F	13	Doug Christie	6 ft 6 in (1.98 m)	200 lb (91 kg)	1970–05–09	Pepperdine
G	8	Mateen Cleaves	6 ft 2 in (1.88 m)	205 lb (93 kg)	1977–09–07	Michigan State
C	21	Vlade Divac	7 ft 1 in (2.16 m)	243 lb (110 kg)	1968–02–03	Serbia
F	51	Lawrence Funderburke	6 ft 9 in (2.06 m)	230 lb (104 kg)	1970–12–15	Ohio State
G	24	Bobby Jackson	6 ft 1 in (1.85 m)	185 lb (84 kg)	1973–03–13	Minnesota
F/C	31	Scot Pollard	6 ft 11 in (2.11 m)	265 lb (120 kg)	1975–02–12	Kansas
G	25	Brent Price	6 ft 1 in (1.85 m)	165 lb (75 kg)	1968–12–09	Oklahoma
F	16	Peja Stojaković	6 ft 10 in (2.08 m)	220 lb (100 kg)	1977–06–09	Serbia
F	5	Hedo Türkoğlu	6 ft 10 in (2.08 m)	220 lb (100 kg)	1979–03–19	Turkey
G/F	3	Gerald Wallace	6 ft 7 in (2.01 m)	215 lb (98 kg)	1982–07–23	Alabama
F/C	4	Chris Webber	6 ft 10 in (2.08 m)	245 lb (111 kg)	1973–03–01	Michigan

Coaches
Head coach
- Rick Adelman
Assistant(s)
- Pete Carril
- Elston Turner
- John Wetzel

Legend
- (DP) Unsigned draft pick
- (FA) Free agent
- (S) Suspended
- Injured

Roster
Updated: February 26, 2002

== Regular season ==
=== Season standings ===
Pacific Division	W	L	PCT	GB	Home	Road	Div
y-Sacramento Kings	61	21	.744	–	36–5	25–16	15–9
x-Los Angeles Lakers	58	24	.707	3	34–7	24–17	16–8
x-Portland Trail Blazers	49	33	.598	12	30–11	19–22	14–10
x-Seattle SuperSonics	45	37	.549	16	26–15	19–22	13–11
e-Los Angeles Clippers	39	43	.476	22	25–16	14–27	9–15
e-Phoenix Suns	36	46	.439	25	23–18	13–28	12–12
e-Golden State Warriors	21	61	.256	40	14–27	7–34	5–19

#	Western Conference				
#	Team	W	L	PCT	GB
1	z-Sacramento Kings	61	21	.744	–
2	y-San Antonio Spurs	58	24	.707	3
3	x-Los Angeles Lakers	58	24	.707	3
4	x-Dallas Mavericks	57	25	.695	4
5	x-Minnesota Timberwolves	50	32	.610	11
6	x-Portland Trail Blazers	49	33	.598	12
7	x-Seattle SuperSonics	45	37	.549	16
8	x-Utah Jazz	44	38	.537	17
9	e-Los Angeles Clippers	39	43	.476	22
10	e-Phoenix Suns	36	46	.439	25
11	e-Houston Rockets	28	54	.341	33
12	e-Denver Nuggets	27	55	.329	34
13	e-Memphis Grizzlies	23	59	.280	38
14	e-Golden State Warriors	21	61	.256	40

=== Game log ===
2001–02 game log
Total: 61–21 (home: 36–5; road: 25–16)
October: 1–0 (home: 1–0; road: 0–0)

Game	Date	Team	Score	High points	High rebounds	High assists	Location Attendance	Record
1	October 30	Seattle	W 101–95	Vlade Divac (27)	Peja Stojaković (9)	Vlade Divac (8)	ARCO Arena; 17,317	1–0

November: 12–4 (home: 6–0; road: 6–4)

Game	Date	Team	Score	High points	High rebounds	High assists	Location Attendance	Record
2	November 3	@ Denver	W 106–94	Peja Stojaković (24)	three players tied (7)	Vlade Divac (8)	Pepsi Center; 15,138	2–0
3	November 4	San Antonio	W 103–83	Vlade Divac (25)	Vlade Divac (11)	three players tied (5)	ARCO Arena; 17,317	3–0
4	November 6	@ Cleveland	W 115–99	Peja Stojaković (32)	Stojaković, Divac (10)	three players tied (6)	Gund Arena; 14,584	4–0
5	November 7	@ Indiana	L 104–116	Peja Stojaković (36)	Vlade Divac (10)	Vlade Divac (6)	Conseco Fieldhouse; 15,309	4–1
6	November 9	@ Orlando	L 105–115	Peja Stojaković (31)	Vlade Divac (15)	Mike Bibby (9)	TD Waterhouse Centre; 17,248	4–2
7	November 10	@ Miami	W 90–75	Peja Stojaković (22)	Vlade Divac (10)	Mike Bibby (5)	American Airlines Arena; 17,853	5–2
8	November 13	Toronto	W 95–86	Bibby, Christie (20)	Scot Pollard (12)	three players tied (4)	ARCO Arena; 17,317	6–2
9	November 16	Chicago	W 105–71	Peja Stojaković (21)	Lawrence Funderburke (8)	Vlade Divac (4)	ARCO Arena; 17,317	7–2
10	November 18	@ L.A. Lakers	L 85–93	Peja Stojaković (25)	Vlade Divac (15)	Vlade Divac (8)	Staples Center; 18,997	7–3
11	November 19	Houston	W 113–77	Peja Stojaković (25)	Scot Pollard (14)	Doug Christie (7)	ARCO Arena; 17,317	8–3
12	November 21	Portland	W 95–83	Mike Bibby (25)	Divac, Pollard (10)	Doug Christie (5)	ARCO Arena; 17,317	9–3
13	November 24	New Jersey	W 98–97	Peja Stojaković (29)	Vlade Divac (19)	Vlade Divac (7)	ARCO Arena; 17,317	10–3
14	November 26	@ Memphis	L 94–98	Peja Stojaković (21)	Pollard, Divac (12)	Mike Bibby (11)	Pyramid Arena; 12,215	10–4
15	November 27	@ Houston	W 89–84	Peja Stojaković (24)	Scot Pollard (11)	Peja Stojaković (5)	Compaq Center; 10,467	11–4
16	November 29	@ Dallas	W 110–98	Peja Stojaković (32)	Scot Pollard (17)	Doug Christie (6)	American Airlines Center; 18,384	12–4
17	November 30	@ San Antonio	W 109–106 (OT)	Hedo Türkoğlu (24)	Stojaković, Jackson (8)	three players tied (4)	Alamodome; 26,808	13–4

December: 10–5 (home: 10–1; road: 0–4)

Game	Date	Team	Score	High points	High rebounds	High assists	Location Attendance	Record
18	December 2	Dallas	L 114–120 (OT)	Peja Stojaković (31)	Vlade Divac (17)	Mike Bibby (6)	ARCO Arena; 17,317	13–5
19	December 4	Philadelphia	W 94–84	Peja Stojaković (20)	Scot Pollard (13)	Mike Bibby (6)	ARCO Arena; 17,317	14–5
10	December 7	L.A. Lakers	W 97–91	Peja Stojaković (25)	Peja Stojaković (8)	Doug Christie (7)	ARCO Arena; 17,317	15–5
21	December 9	Miami	W 95–88	Peja Stojaković (23)	Doug Christie (9)	Mike Bibby (7)	ARCO Arena; 17,317	16–5
22	December 11	Orlando	W 112–100	Chris Webber (24)	Doug Christie (13)	Mike Bibby (11)	ARCO Arena; 17,317	17–5
23	December 12	@ Phoenix	L 88–114	Chris Webber (21)	Chris Webber (12)	Mike Bibby (5)	America West Arena; 14,568	17–6
24	December 14	@ Minnesota	L 94–114	Chris Webber (26)	Chris Webber (9)	Mike Bibby (6)	Target Center; 17,113	17–7
25	December 16	Memphis	W 104–87	Chris Webber (22)	Doug Christie (12)	Doug Christie (7)	ARCO Arena; 17,317	18–7
26	December 18	Detroit	W 102–98	Mike Bibby (25)	Chris Webber (14)	Mike Bibby (7)	ARCO Arena; 17,317	19–7
27	December 19	@ Seattle	L 92–104	Doug Christie (23)	Vlade Divac (8)	Christie, Divac (5)	KeyArena; 15,831	19–8
28	December 22	@ L.A. Clippers	L 85–101	Christie, Jackson (19)	Vlade Divac (12)	Vlade Divac (8)	Staples Center; 18,964	19–9
29	December 23	Phoenix	W 133–101	Peja Stojaković (26)	Hedo Türkoğlu (10)	Vlade Divac (7)	ARCO Arena; 17,317	20–9
30	December 26	Portland	W 89–74	Peja Stojaković (19)	Chris Webber (13)	Vlade Divac (7)	ARCO Arena; 17,317	21–9
31	December 28	Minnesota	W 125–111	Peja Stojaković (27)	Webber, Divac (8)	Mike Bibby (7)	ARCO Arena; 17,317	22–9
32	December 30	Boston	W 109–94	Chris Webber (30)	Scot Pollard (11)	Doug Christie (7)	ARCO Arena; 17,317	23–9

January: 11–1 (home: 7–0; road: 4–1)

Game	Date	Team	Score	High points	High rebounds	High assists	Location Attendance	Record
33	January 2	L.A. Clippers	W 105–91	Chris Webber (21)	Chris Weber (10)	Mike Bibby (9)	ARCO Arena; 17,317	24–9
34	January 5	@ Phoenix	W 118–112	Chris Webber (35)	Scot Pollard (13)	Webber, Bibby (7)	America West Arena; 17,042	25–9
35	January 6	Milwaukee	W 115–101	Peja Stojaković (29)	Vlade Divac (13)	Chris Webber (9)	ARCO Arena; 17,317	26–9
36	January 13	Phoenix	W 103–100	Chris Webber (28)	Chris Webber (13)	Chris Webber (7)	ARCO Arena; 17,317	27–9
37	January 15	Cleveland	W 109–102	Peja Stojaković (36)	Chris Webber (14)	Chris Webber (8)	ARCO Arena; 17,317	28–9
38	January 16	@ Denver	W 112–107	Peja Stojaković (29)	Chris Webber (12)	Chris Webber (9)	Pepsi Center; 16,780	29–9
39	January 18	Golden State	W 121–97	Peja Stojaković (20)	Webber, Türkoğlu (8)	Vlade Divac (8)	ARCO Arena; 17,317	30–9
40	January 21	Memphis	W 112–98	Chris Webber (24)	Webber, Pollard (11)	Doug Christie (7)	ARCO Arena; 17,317	31–9
41	January 22	@ Portland	L 110–116 (OT)	Chris Webber (34)	Vlade Divac (9)	Webber, Christie (8)	Rose Garden; 19,980	31–10
42	January 24	Utah	W 113–80	Chris Webber (24)	Divac, Pollard (8)	Doug Christie (5)	ARCO Arena; 17,317	32–10
43	January 26	@ Utah	W 114–90	Peja Stojaković (25)	Chris Webber (10)	Chris Webber (6)	Delta Center; 19,571	33–10
44	January 31	@ Seattle	W 99–95	Peja Stojaković (32)	Vlade Divac (10)	Mike Bibby (8)	KeyArena; 17,072	34–10

February: 7–5 (home: 5–1; road: 2–4)

Game	Date	Team	Score	High points	High rebounds	High assists	Location Attendance	Record
45	February 1	Denver	W 132–96	Chris Webber (29)	Chris Webber (12)	Christie, Bibby (6)	ARCO Arena; 17,317	35–10
46	February 3	@ Minnesota	W 112–107	Chris Webber (31)	Chris Webber (14)	Doug Christie (8)	Target Center; 19,006	36–10
47	February 4	@ New Jersey	L 83–117	Chris Webber (23)	Chris Webber (9)	Vlade Divac (5)	Continental Airlines Arena; 14,840	36–11
48	February 6	@ Boston	W 102–85	Peja Stojaković (24)	Vlade Divac (14)	Vlade Divac (10)	FleetCenter; 15,621	37–11
49	February 7	@ Washington	L 101–108	Chris Webber (21)	Vlade Divac (10)	four players tied (3)	MCI Center; 20,674	37–12
All-Star Break
50	February 12	San Antonio	W 99–86	Peja Stojaković (23)	Chris Webber (12)	Mike Bibby (10)	ARCO Arena; 17,317	38–12
51	February 14	Washington	W 109–93	Peja Stojaković (21)	Chris Webber (14)	Chris Webber (9)	ARCO Arena; 17,317	39–12
52	February 17	Seattle	L 116–126	Chris Webber (39)	Chris Webber (11)	Mike Bibby (10)	ARCO Arena; 17,317	39–13
53	February 19	Atlanta	W 99–79	Chris Webber (19)	Chris Webber (12)	Mike Bibby (6)	ARCO Arena; 17,317	40–13
54	February 21	@ San Antonio	L 92–115	Bobby Jackson (18)	Vlade Divac (9)	Doug Christie (6)	Alamodome; 18,594	40–14
55	February 23	@ Dallas	L 97–111	Chris Webber (28)	Chris Webber (14)	Mike Bibby (7)	American Airlines Center; 20,181	40–15
56	February 26	Utah	W 107–81	Peja Stojaković (19)	Vlade Divac (12)	Mike Bibby (6)	ARCO Arena; 17,317	41–15

March: 12–4 (home: 4–2; road: 8–2)

Game	Date	Team	Score	High points	High rebounds	High assists	Location Attendance	Record
57	March 1	@ Golden State	W 116–108	Chris Webber (32)	Vlade Divac (10)	Chris Webber (8)	The Arena in Oakland; 19,869	42–15
58	March 3	Indiana	L 86–97	Mike Bibby (19)	Vlade Divac (14)	three players tied (4)	ARCO Arena; 17,317	42–16
59	March 4	@ Portland	L 95–107	Peja Stojaković (26)	Chris Webber (8)	Hedo Türkoğlu (5)	Rose Garden; 19,980	42–17
60	March 8	Charlotte	W 99–87	Peja Stojaković (24)	Vlade Divac (10)	Vlade Divac (7)	ARCO Arena; 17,317	43–17
61	March 10	@ Milwaukee	W 98–73	Peja Stojaković (21)	Chris Webber (15)	Mike Bibby (9)	Bradley Center; 18,178	44–17
62	March 11	@ Chicago	W 107–103	Peja Stojaković (29)	Vlade Divac (14)	Chris Webber (6)	United Center; 19,208	45–17
63	March 13	@ Philadelphia	W 92–88	Chris Webber (22)	Chris Webber (10)	Bibby, Divac (7)	First Union Center; 20,804	46–17
64	March 14	@ New York	L 96–113	Mike Bibby (21)	Scot Pollard (16)	Vlade Divac (7)	Madison Square Garden; 19,763	46–18
65	March 17	@ Toronto	W 116–113	Chris Webber (31)	Chris Webber (15)	Christie, Webber (6)	Air Canada Centre; 19,800	47–18
66	March 19	Houston	W 110–87	Chris Webber (35)	Chris Webber (12)	Doug Christie (10)	ARCO Arena; 17,317	48–18
67	March 21	Denver	W 118–82	Hedo Türkoğlu (31)	Vlade Divac (10)	Hedo Türkoğlu (10)	ARCO Arena; 17,317	49–18
68	March 24	L.A. Lakers	L 96–97	Chris Webber (24)	Vlade Divac (17)	Webber, Bibby (5)	ARCO Arena; 17,317	49–19
69	March 26	L.A. Clippers	W 107–90	Chris Webber (35)	Chris Weber (13)	Doug Christie (6)	ARCO Arena; 17,317	50–19
70	March 28	@ Houston	W 101–74	Chris Webber (19)	Divac, Webber (9)	Chris Webber (6)	Compaq Center; 12,515	51–19
71	March 29	@ Charlotte	W 92–87	Chris Webber (23)	Chris Webber (12)	Chris Webber (6)	Charlotte Coliseum; 14,092	52–19
72	March 31	@ Atlanta	W 92–91	Chris Webber (29)	Chris Webber (12)	Chris Webber (7)	Philips Arena; 19,841	53–19

April: 8–2 (home: 3–1; road: 5–1)

Game	Date	Team	Score	High points	High rebounds	High assists	Location Attendance	Record
73	April 2	@ Memphis	W 107–83	Bobby Jackson (19)	Chris Webber (11)	Christie, Bibby (6)	Pyramid Arena; 11,835	54–19
74	April 3	@ Detroit	W 107–86	Chris Webber (28)	Vlade Divac (9)	Chris Webber (8)	The Palace of Auburn Hills; 22,076	55–19
75	April 5	@ Utah	W 117–109	Chris Webber (28)	Chris Webber (10)	Mike Bibby (7)	Delta Center; 19,911	56–19
76	April 7	New York	W 116–82	Chris Webber (16)	Chris Webber (14)	Doug Christie (8)	ARCO Arena; 17,317	57–19
77	April 9	Minnesota	W 122–103	Chris Webber (30)	Scot Pollard (8)	Doug Christie (8)	ARCO Arena; 17,317	58–19
78	April 10	@ Golden State	W 118–116	Chris Webber (31)	Chris Webber (12)	Vlade Divac (7)	The Arena in Oakland; 16,232	59–19
79	April 12	@ L.A. Clippers	W 125–106	Chris Webber (28)	Vlade Divac (10)	Mike Bibby (9)	Staples Center; 19,818	60–19
80	April 14	Dallas	L 100–113	Chris Webber (19)	Webber, Divac (9)	Doug Christie (8)	ARCO Arena; 17,317	60–20
81	April 16	Golden State	W 120–106	Lawrence Funderburke (29)	Scot Pollard (14)	Divac, Christie (7)	ARCO Arena; 17,317	61–20
82	April 17	@ L.A. Lakers	L 95–109	Funderburke, Bibby (15)	Scot Pollard (11)	Mike Bibby (4)	Staples Center; 18,997	61–21

2001–02 schedule

== Playoffs ==
2002 playoff game log
First round: 3–1 (home: 1–1; road: 2–0)

Game	Date	Team	Score	High points	High rebounds	High assists	Location Attendance	Series
1	April 20	Utah	W 89–86	Chris Webber (24)	Chris Webber (12)	Chris Webber (7)	ARCO Arena; 17,317	1–0
2	April 23	Utah	L 86–93	Vlade Divac (21)	Chris Webber (9)	Doug Christie (5)	ARCO Arena; 17,317	1–1
3	April 27	@ Utah	W 90–87	Mike Bibby (26)	Chris Webber (13)	Mike Bibby (5)	Delta Center; 19,911	2–1
4	April 29	@ Utah	W 91–86	Peja Stojaković (30)	Chris Webber (9)	Doug Christie (9)	Delta Center; 19,911	3–1

Conference semifinals: 4–1 (home: 2–1; road: 2–0)

Game	Date	Team	Score	High points	High rebounds	High assists	Location Attendance	Series
1	May 4	Dallas	W 108–91	Peja Stojaković (26)	Vlade Divac (16)	Bibby, Christie (8)	ARCO Arena; 17,317	1–0
2	May 6	Dallas	L 102–110	Bibby, Webber (22)	Stojaković, Webber (12)	Mike Bibby (7)	ARCO Arena; 17,317	1–1
3	May 9	@ Dallas	W 125–119	Chris Webber (31)	Chris Webber (15)	Mike Bibby (9)	American Airlines Center; 20,265	2–1
4	May 11	@ Dallas	W 115–113 (OT)	Chris Webber (30)	Vlade Divac (14)	Bobby Jackson (5)	American Airlines Center; 20,274	3–1
5	May 13	Dallas	W 114–101	Bibby, Webber (23)	Hedo Türkoğlu (13)	Doug Christie (7)	ARCO Arena; 17,317	4–1

Conference finals: 3–4 (home: 2–2; road: 1–2)

Game	Date	Team	Score	High points	High rebounds	High assists	Location Attendance	Series
1	May 18	L.A. Lakers	L 99–106	Chris Webber (28)	Chris Webber (14)	Chris Webber (6)	ARCO Arena; 17,317	0–1
2	May 20	L.A. Lakers	W 96–90	Chris Webber (21)	Vlade Divac (14)	Mike Bibby (8)	ARCO Arena; 17,317	1–1
3	May 24	@ L.A. Lakers	W 103–90	Chris Webber (26)	Chris Webber (12)	Christie, Webber (6)	Staples Center; 18,997	2–1
4	May 26	@ L.A. Lakers	L 99–100	Vlade Divac (23)	Hedo Türkoğlu (12)	Christie, Webber (5)	Staples Center; 18,997	2–2
5	May 28	L.A. Lakers	W 92–91	Chris Webber (29)	Chris Webber (13)	three players tied (3)	ARCO Arena; 17,317	3–2
6	May 31	@ L.A. Lakers	L 102–106	Chris Webber (26)	Chris Webber (13)	Chris Webber (8)	Staples Center; 18,997	3–3
7	June 2	L.A. Lakers	L 106–112 (OT)	Mike Bibby (29)	Vlade Divac (10)	Chris Webber (11)	ARCO Arena; 17,317	3–4

2002 schedule

== Player statistics ==
Legend
GP	Games played	GS	Games started	MPG	Minutes per game
FG%	Field-goal percentage	3P%	3-point field-goal percentage	FT%	Free-throw percentage
RPG	Rebounds per game	APG	Assists per game	SPG	Steals per game
BPG	Blocks per game	PPG	Points per game

Player statistics source:

=== Regular season statistics ===
Player	GP	GS	MPG	FG%	3P%	FT%	RPG	APG	SPG	BPG	PPG
Mike Bibby	80	80	33.2	.453	.370	.803	2.8	5.0	1.1	.2	13.7
Chucky Brown	18	0	5.1	.370	—	.500	1.8	.3	.1	.2	1.2
Doug Christie	81	81	34.5	.460	.352	.851	4.6	4.2	2.0	.3	12.0
Mateen Cleaves	32	0	4.8	.441	.250	.889	.3	.8	.2	.0	2.2
Vlade Divac	80	80	30.3	.472	.231	.615	8.4	3.7	1.0	1.2	11.1
Lawrence Funderburke	56	1	12.9	.469	.000	.607	3.5	.6	.2	.3	4.7
Bobby Jackson	81	3	21.6	.443	.361	.810	3.1	2.0	.9	.1	11.1
Scot Pollard	80	29	23.5	.550	—	.693	7.1	.7	.9	1.0	6.4
Brent Price	20	0	4.5	.333	.267	.692	.4	.5	.2	.1	1.6
Jabari Smith‡	12	0	5.9	.286	.000	.500	1.2	.5	.2	.3	1.5
Peja Stojaković	71	71	37.3	.484	.416	.876	5.3	2.5	1.1	.2	21.2
Hedo Türkoğlu	80	10	24.6	.422	.368	.726	4.5	2.0	.7	.4	10.1
Gerald Wallace	54	1	8.0	.429	.000	.500	1.6	.5	.4	.1	3.2
Chris Webber	54	54	38.4	.495	.263	.749	10.1	4.8	1.7	1.4	24.5

‡ – waived during the season

=== Playoffs statistics ===
Player	GP	GS	MPG	FG%	3P%	FT%	RPG	APG	SPG	BPG	PPG
Mike Bibby	16	16	41.3	.444	.424	.826	3.8	5.0	1.4	.2	20.3
Chucky Brown	1	0	1.0	—	—	—	1.0	.0	.0	.0	.0
Doug Christie	16	16	40.3	.409	.266	.800	5.8	4.9	2.1	.6	11.1
Vlade Divac	16	16	33.4	.464	.286	.755	9.3	1.7	1.1	1.3	13.5
Lawrence Funderburke	5	0	4.0	.667	—	1.000	.4	.0	.0	.0	1.2
Bobby Jackson	16	1	23.4	.445	.256	.791	3.3	2.0	.9	.2	10.9
Scot Pollard	15	0	12.9	.525	—	.667	3.5	.2	.5	.3	3.3
Peja Stojaković	10	7	33.8	.376	.271	.897	6.3	1.0	.5	.0	14.8
Hedo Türkoğlu	16	8	27.7	.401	.353	.516	5.2	1.4	.4	.6	8.6
Gerald Wallace	5	0	2.8	.000	—	1.000	.2	.2	.0	.2	.8
Chris Webber	16	16	41.7	.502	.000	.596	10.8	4.7	.9	1.6	23.7

== Awards and records ==
- Chris Webber, All-NBA Second Team
- Doug Christie, NBA All-Defensive Second Team
