= 1998 NCAA Men's Basketball All-Americans =

- Awarded for: 1997–98 NCAA Division I men's basketball season

The Consensus 1998 College Basketball All-American team, as determined by aggregating the results of four major All-American teams. To earn "consensus" status, a player must win honors from a majority of the following teams: the Associated Press, the USBWA, The Sporting News and the National Association of Basketball Coaches.

In 1998, the Sporting News was added as a contributing source to the consensus teams, belatedly replacing the UPI All-American team, which ceased to exist after 1996.

== 1998 Consensus All-America team ==
Consensus First Team
Player	Position	Class	Team
Mike Bibby	G	Sophomore	Arizona
Antawn Jamison	F	Junior	North Carolina
Raef LaFrentz	C	Senior	Kansas
Paul Pierce	F	Junior	Kansas
Miles Simon	G	Senior	Arizona

Consensus Second Team
Player	Position	Class	Team
Vince Carter	F	Junior	North Carolina
Mateen Cleaves	G	Sophomore	Michigan State
Pat Garrity	F	Senior	Notre Dame
Richard Hamilton	F-G	Sophomore	Connecticut
Ansu Sesay	F	Senior	Mississippi

== Individual All-America teams ==
All-America Team
All-America Team	First team		Second team		Third team	
All-America Team	Player	School	Player	School	Player	School
Associated Press	Mike Bibby	Arizona	Vince Carter	North Carolina	Michael Dickerson	Arizona
Associated Press	Antawn Jamison	North Carolina	Mateen Cleaves	Michigan State	Matt Harpring	Georgia Tech
Associated Press	Raef LaFrentz	Kansas	Pat Garrity	Notre Dame	Trajan Langdon	Duke
Associated Press	Paul Pierce	Kansas	Richard Hamilton	Connecticut	Lee Nailon	TCU
Associated Press	Miles Simon	Arizona	Ansu Sesay	Mississippi	Bonzi Wells	Ball State
USBWA	Mike Bibby	Arizona	Vince Carter	North Carolina	Pat Garrity	Notre Dame
USBWA	Mateen Cleaves	Michigan State	Richard Hamilton	Connecticut	Trajan Langdon	Duke
USBWA	Antawn Jamison	North Carolina	Matt Harpring	Georgia Tech	Andre Miller	Utah
USBWA	Raef LaFrentz	Kansas	Ansu Sesay	Mississippi	Lee Nailon	TCU
USBWA	Paul Pierce	Kansas	Bonzi Wells	Ball State	Miles Simon	Arizona
NABC	Mike Bibby	Arizona	Vince Carter	North Carolina	Mateen Cleaves	Michigan State
NABC	Antawn Jamison	North Carolina	Pat Garrity	Notre Dame	Trajan Langdon	Duke
NABC	Raef LaFrentz	Kansas	Richard Hamilton	Connecticut	Lee Nailon	TCU
NABC	Paul Pierce	Kansas	Matt Harpring	Georgia Tech	Kenny Thomas	New Mexico
NABC	Miles Simon	Arizona	Ansu Sesay	Mississippi	Robert Traylor	Michigan
Sporting News	Mike Bibby	Arizona	Vince Carter	North Carolina	No third team	
Sporting News	Antawn Jamison	North Carolina	Pat Garrity	Notre Dame	No third team	
Sporting News	Raef LaFrentz	Kansas	Richard Hamilton	Connecticut	No third team	
Sporting News	Paul Pierce	Kansas	Trajan Langdon	Duke	No third team	
Sporting News	Miles Simon	Arizona	Kenny Thomas	New Mexico	No third team	

AP Honorable Mention:

- Chad Austin, Purdue
- Toby Bailey, UCLA
- Corey Benjamin, Oregon State
- Elton Brand, Duke
- Corey Brewer, Oklahoma
- Louis Bullock, Michigan
- Cory Carr, Texas Tech
- Anthony Carter, Hawaii
- Ed Cota, North Carolina
- Michael Doleac, Utah
- Khalid El-Amin, Connecticut
- Evan Eschmeyer, Northwestern
- Steve Goodrich, Princeton
- J. R. Henderson, UCLA
- Larry Hughes, Saint Louis
- Sam Jacobson, Minnesota
- DeMarco Johnson, Charlotte
- Charles Jones, Long Island
- Mike Jones, TCU
- De'Teri Mayes, Murray State
- BJ McKie, South Carolina
- Roshown McLeod, Duke
- Andre Miller, Utah
- Brad Miller, Purdue
- Nazr Mohammed, Kentucky
- Michael Olowokandi, Pacific
- Ruben Patterson, Cincinnati
- Laron Profit, Maryland
- Jeff Sheppard, Kentucky
- Brian Skinner, Baylor
- Kenny Thomas, New Mexico
- Robert Traylor, Michigan
- Jeremy Veal, Arizona State
- Tyson Wheeler, Rhode Island
- Shammond Williams, North Carolina
- Steve Wojciechowski, Duke
