= Evan Eschmeyer =

American basketball player (born 1975)

Personal information
- Born: May 30, 1975 (age 51) New Knoxville, Ohio, U.S.
- Listed height: 6 ft 11 in (2.11 m)
- Listed weight: 255 lb (116 kg)

Career information
- High school: New Knoxville (New Knoxville, Ohio)
- College: Northwestern (1995–1999)
- NBA draft: 1999: 2nd round, 34th overall pick
- Drafted by: New Jersey Nets
- Playing career: 1999–2003
- Position: Center
- Number: 00, 42

Career history
- 1999–2001: New Jersey Nets
- 2001–2003: Dallas Mavericks

Career highlights
- Consensus second-team All-American (1999); 3× First-team All-Big Ten (1997–1999)

Career statistics
- Points: 421 (2.8 ppg)
- Rebounds: 601 (3.9 rpg)
- Stats at NBA.com
- Stats at Basketball Reference

Evan Bruce Eschmeyer (born May 30, 1975) is an American former professional basketball player who was selected by the New Jersey Nets in the second round (34th pick overall) of the 1999 NBA draft. He spent six years on the Northwestern Wildcats (1993–1999), missing the first two due to a foot injury. He was their 6'11" center, scoring 1,805 points and grabbing 995 rebounds. He led the Wildcats (he was #1 on the team in scoring and rebounding for three consecutive seasons) to an NIT berth in 1999 with a 15–14 record. In the 1999 Big Ten Conference men's basketball tournament, his 8th seeded wildcats nearly beat the #1 seeded Michigan State Spartans but lost to a last second shot by Spartan great Mateen Cleaves. Eschmeyer played in four NBA seasons from 1999 to 2003. He played for the Nets from 1999 to 2001 and the Dallas Mavericks from 2001 to 2003. He averaged 2.9 pts, 3.9 rebs, and 0.6 blocks per game.

In his four-year NBA career, Eschmeyer played in 153 games and scored a total of 421 points. In October 2004, he retired from basketball because of persistent knee problems. Eschmeyer had four knee surgeries in five years. Doctors told him to retire or run the risk of very limited mobility when he had children. He is a Democrat who worked on Barack Obama's 2008 presidential campaign. After working for an environmental law firm in Ohio, Eschmeyer moved to Boulder, Colorado and works as a private investor. Eschmeyer is a lifetime member of Net Impact.

Evan's wife, the former Kristina Divjak, also played at Northwestern as a 6'0" forward and led the Big Ten in scoring with 22.1 points per game in 1997–98, ranking 13th nationally. The couple are parents to a son, Elijah, and two daughters, Alexandra and Mila. In 2021–22, the 6'4" Alexandra exploded onto the high school girls hoops scene as a freshman, leading Peak to Peak Charter School (Lafayette, CO) in nearly every statistical category: 15.4 points per game, 10.4 rebounds per game and 3.6 blocks per game. Alexandra's 6'7" twin brother, Elijah, finished his freshman year at Peak to Peak with 6.6 ppg, 3.9 rpg and 2.8 bpg.

== NBA career statistics ==
Legend
GP	Games played	GS	Games started	MPG	Minutes per game
FG%	Field goal percentage	3P%	3-point field goal percentage	FT%	Free throw percentage
RPG	Rebounds per game	APG	Assists per game	SPG	Steals per game
BPG	Blocks per game	PPG	Points per game	**Bold**	Career high

=== Regular season ===
Year	Team	GP	GS	MPG	FG%	3P%	FT%	RPG	APG	SPG	BPG	PPG
1999–2000	New Jersey	31	5	12.0	**.528**	—	.500	3.5	**.7**	.3	.7	2.9
2000–01	New Jersey	**74**	**51**	**18.0**	.460	—	.657	**4.9**	.5	**.6**	**.8**	**3.4**
2001–02	Dallas	31	6	9.6	.420	—	.606	3.2	.3	.3	.3	2.0
2002–03	Dallas	17	3	7.9	.368	—	**.750**	1.7	.4	.6	.4	1.0
Career		153	65	14.0	.463	—	.621	3.9	.5	.5	.6	2.8

=== Playoffs ===
Year	Team	GP	GS	MPG	FG%	3P%	FT%	RPG	APG	SPG	BPG	PPG
2002	Dallas	3	0	2.7	.000	—	—	.7	.3	.0	**.3**	0.0
2003	Dallas	**5**	0	**6.4**	**.500**	—	—	**1.0**	**.4**	**.6**	.2	**1.2**
Career		8	0	5.0	.429	—	—	.9	.4	.4	.3	.8
