= 2002 NBA All-Star Game =

Exhibition basketball game

	1	2	3	4	Total
West	32	40	28	35	135
East	24	31	22	43	120
- Date: February 10, 2002
- Arena: First Union Center
- City: Philadelphia
- MVP: Kobe Bryant
- National anthem: Patti LaBelle (US); Kathleen Edwards (Canada)
- Halftime show: Elton John
- Attendance: 19,581
- Network: NBC
- Announcers: Marv Albert; Steve Jones; Bill Walton

NBA All-Star Game
< 2001	2003 >

The 2002 NBA All-Star Game was an exhibition basketball game which was played on February 10, 2002, at the First Union Center in Philadelphia, home of the Philadelphia 76ers. This game was the 51st edition of the North American NBA All-Star Game and was played during the 2001–02 NBA season.

The venue was originally scheduled for the 1998-99 NBA season, but was cancelled due to the 1998-99 NBA lockout and moved to 2002, which was the next All-Star game that had not yet been awarded to another city. It was the fourth time the city of Philadelphia hosted the All-Star Game, following the 1960 game hosted by the Philadelphia Warriors at the Convention Hall, and the 1970 and 1976 games hosted by the 76ers at their previous home arena, the Spectrum. It was also the fourth All-Star Game hosted by the 76ers franchise, which hosted their first in 1961 as the Syracuse Nationals.

The West defeated the East 135–120, with Kobe Bryant of the Los Angeles Lakers winning the Most Valuable Player. Bryant scored 31 points, dished 5 assists, and grabbed 5 rebounds, despite being booed by the hometown crowd. Tracy McGrady led the way for the East, scoring 25 points off the bench. He also made one of the most memorable plays in All-Star Game history, the self pass off the backboard dunk.

This was also the last All-Star Game to feature players wearing their respective team jerseys and the last to be seen on over-the-air television until 2026 (all games from 2003 to 2025 aired on the cable channel TNT).

== All-Star Game ==
=== Coaches ===
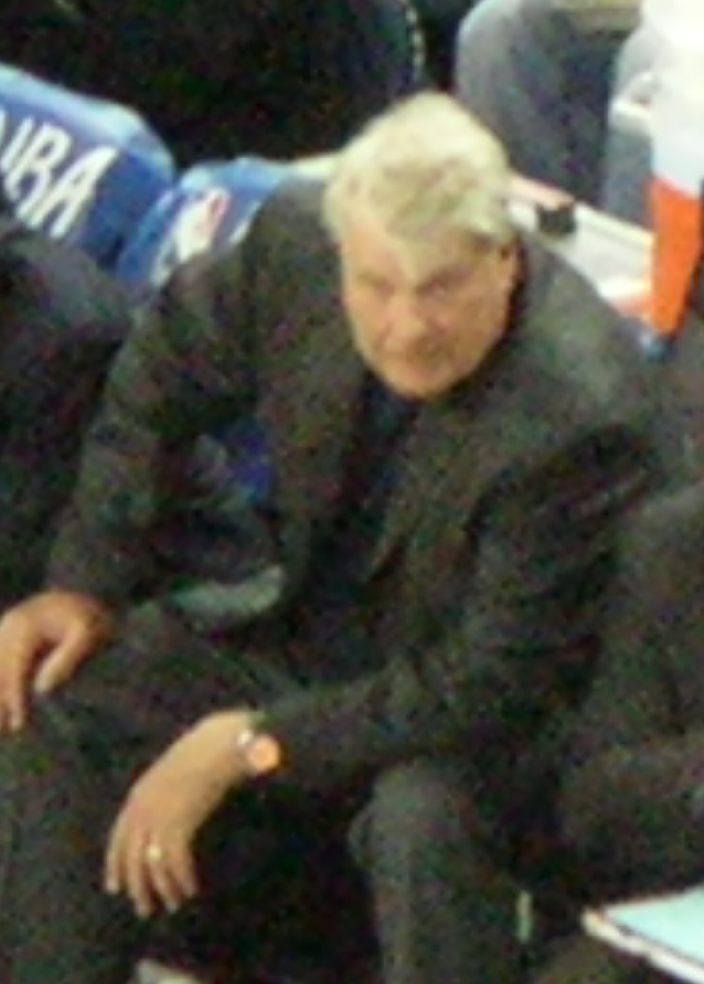
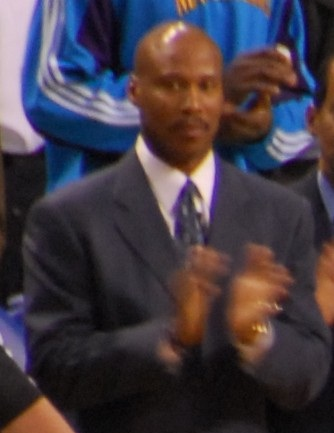
Don Nelson (left) and Byron Scott (right) were selected as the West and East head coach, respectively.

The coach for the Eastern Conference team was Byron Scott, head coach of the Eastern Conference leader New Jersey Nets.

Although the Sacramento Kings had the best record in the Western Conference, their head coach, Rick Adelman, was ineligible to coach in the All-Star Game because he had coached in the 2001 game and league rules prohibit a coach from coaching in consecutive All-Star Games. Consequently, Don Nelson, head coach of the third-place Dallas Mavericks, was named the coach for the Western Conference team per the same rules, as he had coached the game less recently in 1992 than Phil Jackson, head coach of the second-place Los Angeles Lakers who did so in 2000.

=== Players ===
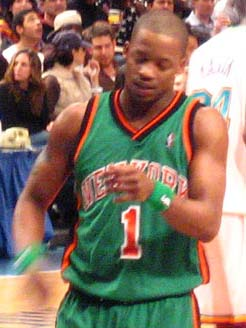
Steve Francis was selected by fans as an All-Star starter for the first time.

The rosters for the All-Star Game were chosen in two ways. The starters were chosen via a fan ballot. Two guards, two forwards and one center who received the highest vote were named the All-Star starters. The reserves were chosen by votes among the NBA head coaches in their respective conferences. The coaches were not permitted to vote for their own players. The reserves consist of two guards, two forwards, one center and two players regardless of position. If a player is unable to participate due to injury, the commissioner will select a replacement.

For the third consecutive year, Vince Carter of the Toronto Raptors topped the ballots with 1,470,176 votes, which earned him a starting position as a forward in the Eastern Conference team for the third year in a row. Allen Iverson, Michael Jordan, Antoine Walker, and Dikembe Mutombo completed the Eastern Conference starting position. This was the third consecutive All-Star appearance by Carter and Iverson, and Mutombo's eighth appearance as an All-Star. It also marked Jordan's 13th appearance as an All-Star, and the first after his return from retirement. The Eastern Conference reserves included four first-time selections, Shareef Abdur-Rahim, Baron Davis, Jermaine O'Neal, and Paul Pierce. Ray Allen, Jason Kidd, Tracy McGrady, and Alonzo Mourning rounded out the team. Two teams, Philadelphia 76ers, and Boston Celtics, had two representatives at the All-Star Game with Iverson/Mutombo, and Walker/Pierce.

For the second consecutive year, the Western Conference's leading vote-getter was Shaquille O'Neal, who earned his ninth consecutive All-Star Game selection with 1,247,438 votes. Steve Francis, Kobe Bryant, Kevin Garnett, and Tim Duncan completed the Western Conference starting positions. Bryant, Garnett, O'Neal, and Duncan were all starters for the previous year's Western Conference team. Francis became an All-Star for the first time. The Western Conference reserves include five first-time selections, Elton Brand, Steve Nash, Dirk Nowitzki, Peja Stojaković, and Wally Szczerbiak. The team is rounded out by Gary Payton, Chris Webber, and Karl Malone. Four teams, Los Angeles Lakers, Dallas Mavericks, Minnesota Timberwolves, and Sacramento Kings, had two representations at the All-Star Game with Bryant/O'Neal, Nash/Nowitzki, Garnett/Szczerbiak, and Webber/Stojaković.

=== Roster ===
Eastern Conference All-Stars
Pos	Player	Team	No. of selections	Votes
Starters
G	Allen Iverson	Philadelphia 76ers	3rd	920,502
G	Michael Jordan	Washington Wizards	13th	985,448
F	Vince Carter^{INJ}	Toronto Raptors	3rd	1,470,176
F	Antoine Walker	Boston Celtics	2nd	547,172
C	Dikembe Mutombo	Philadelphia 76ers	8th	616,566
Reserves
G	Ray Allen	Milwaukee Bucks	3rd	365,421
G	Baron Davis^{REP}	Charlotte Hornets	1st	127,291
G	Jason Kidd^{1}	New Jersey Nets	5th	442,630
G	Tracy McGrady	Orlando Magic	2nd	453,276
F	Paul Pierce	Boston Celtics	1st	254,840
F	Shareef Abdur-Rahim	Atlanta Hawks	1st	335,955
F	Jermaine O'Neal	Indiana Pacers	1st	411,422
C	Alonzo Mourning	Miami Heat	7th	279,423

Western Conference All-Stars
Pos	Player	Team	No. of selections	Votes
Starters
G	Steve Francis	Houston Rockets	1st	456,972
G	Kobe Bryant	Los Angeles Lakers	4th	1,121,753
F	Kevin Garnett	Minnesota Timberwolves	5th	880,692
F	Tim Duncan	San Antonio Spurs	4th	762,289
C	Shaquille O'Neal^{INJ}	Los Angeles Lakers	9th	1,247,438
Reserves
G	Steve Nash	Dallas Mavericks	1st	278,664
G	Gary Payton	Seattle SuperSonics	8th	367,120
F	Elton Brand^{REP}	Los Angeles Clippers	1st	160,678
F	Karl Malone	Utah Jazz	14th	163,009
F	Dirk Nowitzki	Dallas Mavericks	1st	398,184
F	Peja Stojaković	Sacramento Kings	1st	323,664
F	Wally Szczerbiak	Minnesota Timberwolves	1st	—
F	Chris Webber^{1}	Sacramento Kings	4th	553,401

^INJ Vince Carter and Shaquille O'Neal were unable to participate due to injury.
^REP Baron Davis and Elton Brand were named as Carter and O'Neal's replacements respectively.
^1 Jason Kidd and Chris Webber were named as starters, replacing Carter and O'Neal respectively

=== Game ===
February 10, 2002

Western Conference 135, Eastern Conference 120
Scoring by quarter: 32–24, 40–31, 28–22, 35–43
Pts: Kobe Bryant 31; Rebs: Tim Duncan 14; Asts: Steve Nash 9	Pts: Tracy McGrady 24; Rebs: Dikembe Mutombo 10; Asts: Baron Davis and Ray Allen 5

First Union Center, Philadelphia
Attendance: 19,581
Referees:
- Bennett Salvatore
- Derrick Stafford
- Jess Kersey

== All-Star Weekend ==
=== Rookie Challenge ===
Rookies
Pos.	Player	Team
SF	Shane Battier	Memphis Grizzlies
PF	Pau Gasol	Memphis Grizzlies
PF/C	Brendan Haywood	Washington Wizards
SG	Joe Johnson	Boston Celtics
SF	Andrei Kirilenko	Utah Jazz
PG	Tony Parker	San Antonio Spurs
C	Željko Rebrača	Detroit Pistons
SG	Jason Richardson	Golden State Warriors
PG	Jamaal Tinsley	Indiana Pacers
Head coach: Chuck Daly
Assistant coach: Darryl Dawkins

Sophomores
Pos.	Player	Team
SF	Marcus Fizer	Chicago Bulls
PF	Kenyon Martin	New Jersey Nets
SG	Desmond Mason	Seattle SuperSonics
F/C	Chris Mihm	Cleveland Cavaliers
SF	Darius Miles	Los Angeles Clippers
SG	Mike Miller	Orlando Magic
F	Lee Nailon	Charlotte Hornets
SG	Morris Peterson	Toronto Raptors
SG	Quentin Richardson	Los Angeles Clippers
PF	Stromile Swift	Memphis Grizzlies
SF	Hedo Türkoğlu	Sacramento Kings
Head coach: Billy Cunningham
Assistant coach: Bobby Jones

=== Slam Dunk Contest ===
Contestants
Pos.	Player	Team	Height	Weight
G/F	Jason Richardson	Golden State Warriors	6–6	225
F	Gerald Wallace	Sacramento Kings	6–7	220
G/F	Desmond Mason	Seattle SuperSonics	6–5	222
G	Steve Francis	Houston Rockets	6–3	210

This year's contest adopted a new format. Two pairs of contestants faced each other, with the winner of each matchup advancing to the final round. Prior to each dunk, the players would spin a wheel to determine what kind of dunk they had to perform.

Semifinals
1	Desmond Mason (Seattle)	84 (41,43,36)
4	Jason Richardson (Golden State)	98 (48,31,50)
3	Steve Francis (Houston)	77 (31,40,37)
2	Gerald Wallace (Sacramento)	84 (41,43,36)

Finals
Jason Richardson	85 (36+49)
Gerald Wallace	80 (44+36)

=== Three-Point Shootout ===
Peja Stojakovic won the Three Point Shootout, defeating Wesley Person in a shoot-off by the score of 9–5. Prior to that, the final round also included Steve Nash, who finished in third place.

Contestants
Pos.	Player	Team
SG	Ray Allen	Milwaukee Bucks
SG	Mike Miller	Orlando Magic
PG	Steve Nash	Dallas Mavericks
SG	Wesley Person	Cleveland Cavaliers
SF	Paul Pierce	Boston Celtics
SF/SG	Quentin Richardson	Los Angeles Clippers
SF	Peja Stojaković	Sacramento Kings

=== All-Star Hoop-It-Up ===
Contestants
Houston
Cuttino Mobley	Houston Rockets
Tina Thompson	Houston Comets
Kenny Smith	Houston Rockets (Retired)
Jamie Foxx	Celebrity
International
Hedo Türkoğlu	Sacramento Kings
Ticha Penicheiro	Sacramento Monarchs
Sarunas Marciulionis	Sacramento Kings (Retired)
Tom Cavanagh	Celebrity
Los Angeles
Derek Fisher	Los Angeles Lakers
Lisa Leslie	Los Angeles Sparks
Magic Johnson	Los Angeles Lakers (Retired)
Brian McKnight	Celebrity
Philadelphia
Eric Snow	Philadelphia 76ers
Dawn Staley	Charlotte Sting (Philadelphia Native)
Moses Malone	Philadelphia 76ers (Retired)
Justin Timberlake	Celebrity
