= 2001–02 NBA season =

56th NBA season

- League: National Basketball Association
- Sport: Basketball
- Duration: October 30, 2001 – April 17, 2002; April 20 – June 2, 2002 (Playoffs); June 5 – 12, 2002 (Finals)
- Teams: 29
- TV partner(s): NBC, TNT, TBS

Draft
- Top draft pick: Kwame Brown
- Picked by: Washington Wizards

Regular season
- Top seed: Sacramento Kings
- Season MVP: Tim Duncan (San Antonio)
- Top scorer: Allen Iverson (Philadelphia)

Playoffs
- Eastern champions: New Jersey Nets
- Eastern runners-up: Boston Celtics
- Western champions: Los Angeles Lakers
- Western runners-up: Sacramento Kings

Finals
- Champions: Los Angeles Lakers
- Runners-up: New Jersey Nets
- Finals MVP: Shaquille O'Neal (L.A. Lakers)

NBA seasons
- ← 2000–01 2002–03 →

The 2001–02 NBA season was the 56th season of the National Basketball Association (NBA). The season ended with the Los Angeles Lakers winning their third straight championship, beating the New Jersey Nets 4–0 in the 2002 NBA Finals.

== Notable occurrences ==
Coaching changes
Offseason
Team	2000–01 coach	2001–02 coach
Cleveland Cavaliers	Randy Wittman	John Lucas
Detroit Pistons	George Irvine	Rick Carlisle
Portland Trail Blazers	Mike Dunleavy, Sr.	Maurice Cheeks
Washington Wizards	Leonard Hamilton	Doug Collins
In-season
Team	Outgoing coach	Incoming coach
Chicago Bulls	Tim Floyd	Bill Berry
Chicago Bulls	Bill Berry	Bill Cartwright
Denver Nuggets	Dan Issel	Mike Evans
Golden State Warriors	Dave Cowens	Brian Winters
New York Knicks	Jeff Van Gundy	Don Chaney
Phoenix Suns	Scott Skiles	Frank Johnson

- Kwame Brown became the first high school player to be drafted first overall when the Washington Wizards drafted him in the 2001 NBA draft.
- The Grizzlies relocated from Vancouver, British Columbia to Memphis, Tennessee. They played their first three seasons at The Pyramid in Memphis.
- The 2002 NBA All-Star Game was held at First Union Center in Philadelphia. Kobe Bryant of the Lakers took MVP honors amidst boos from the Philadelphia fans following a 135–120 victory by the West. Philadelphia was originally slated to host the 1999 All-Star Game but was awarded the 2002 game instead due to the 1999 lockout.
- Prior to the start of the season, NBA and Chicago Bulls guard Michael Jordan, then part-owner of the Washington Wizards, announced his second comeback to the NBA, this time with the Wizards. The announcement was delayed due to the September 11 attacks.
- The Dallas Mavericks played their first game at the American Airlines Center, not to be confused with the American Airlines Arena (now Kaseya Center) in Miami, Florida.
- This was the last season for NBC, but the network would regain for NBA coverage starting in the 2025–26 season. This was also the last season TBS broadcast NBA games on a regular basis.
- NBA teams wore patches on their jerseys with the American flag and a red-white-and-blue ribbon, in honor of the victims of the September 11 attacks. The Raptors wore the American and Canadian flags on their jerseys.
- The only Canadian team left in the NBA, the Toronto Raptors, after losing seventeen of eighteen to drop to 30–38, won twelve of their last fourteen to finish at 42–40 and go to the NBA playoffs as the seventh seed in the East.
- The New Jersey Nets, who had never won fifty games in a season and had only been to the second round of the playoffs once, won 52 games to reach the Finals.
- 2001–02 is one of the most memorable seasons in the history of the Milwaukee Bucks. The team got off to a division-leading 26–13 start and were 10 games over .500 as late as March 6. However, the Bucks lost 16 of their last 22 games and missed the playoffs, one of the biggest late season collapses for a team that was contending for a division title in March.
- For the first time since 1985–86, no team won fewer than twenty games. The Chicago Bulls and Golden State Warriors shared the league's worst record of 21–61. This had however previously occurred during every season between 1973–74 and 1978–79 and again from 1983–84 to 1985–86.
- Former All-Star Jayson Williams was charged with the murder of his limousine driver on February 14. He was immediately fired from his spot on NBC's Verizon Wireless at the Half shortly after appearing on TV during the All-Star Game the previous week.
- Marv Albert and Mike Fratello were involved in a limousine crash prior to the start of the 2002 Playoffs and were unable to announce for NBC. Albert returned to announce the 2002 Western Conference Finals and NBA Finals.
- The San Antonio Spurs played their last season at the Alamodome. (Notably, this was the last time an NBA team's primary home venue was a non-NBA/non-basketball-specific arena, in this case an American football-specific stadium.)
- The zone defense was legalized.
- The defensive three-second violation was introduced.
- This season marked the last time the NBA playoffs used a best–of–five series in the first round. Started from next season onwards, the playoffs first-round series switched to the best–of–seven format.
- Several notable missed calls occurred during the playoffs regarding buzzer beaters. During the Magic–Hornets series, Baron Davis's game-winner was incorrectly waved off at the buzzer by referee Bernie Fryer; in the Nets–Pacers series, Reggie Miller hit a turnaround 40-foot three–pointer slightly after the buzzer at the end of regulation that referee Bob Delaney granted anyways; and lastly in Game 4 of the Kings–Lakers series, Samaki Walker hit a three–pointer slightly after the buzzer at the end of the first half that was granted anyways. Following the season, the NBA instituted new rules regarding the end-of-period indicators. An LED light strip on the backboard and the scorer's table replaced the traditional electric red light behind the backboard, and a shot clock visible to all three viewable sides was mandated.
- Game 6 of the Western Conference Finals series between the Kings and the Lakers is considered to be one of the most controversial games in NBA history, as numerous questionable calls went against the Kings in the fourth quarter. The Lakers, led by O'Neal's 41 points and 17 rebounds, won, 106–102, setting the stage for Game 7 in Sacramento. There are allegations that the game was affected by the referees in relationship to the Tim Donaghy scandal.
- This season marked the first time the league's scoring leader (in this case Allen Iverson) failed to make the All-NBA First Team.

== 2001–02 NBA changes ==
- Dallas Mavericks – added new logo and new uniforms, replacing blue and green with dark navy blue, grey and black, and moved into their new arena the American Airlines Center.
- Detroit Pistons – added new logo and new uniforms, also brought back original red, white and blue colors replacing teal and maroon, added side panels to their jerseys and shorts.
- Los Angeles Lakers – added new logo changed from a lighter purple to a darker purple still remained with the gold and black color.
- New York Knicks – slightly changed their uniforms, removed from the jersey numbers with side stripes and panels to their shorts.
- Memphis Grizzlies – relocation from Canada to the United States, and moved to Memphis, Tennessee. Changed wordmark on their jerseys.
- Miami Heat – added new red alternate uniforms with black side panels to their jerseys and shorts.
- Milwaukee Bucks – slightly changed their uniforms, added side panels to their jerseys.
- Seattle SuperSonics – added new logo and new uniforms, also brought back original yellow and emerald green colors replacing dark green and red.

== Standings ==
=== By division ===
Eastern Conference

Atlantic Division	W	L	PCT	GB	Home	Road	Div
y-New Jersey Nets	52	30	.634	–	33–8	19–22	16–8
x-Boston Celtics	49	33	.598	3	27–14	22–19	17–7
x-Orlando Magic	44	38	.537	8	27–14	17–24	12–12
x-Philadelphia 76ers	43	39	.524	9	22–19	21–20	14–11
e-Washington Wizards	37	45	.451	15	22–19	15–26	12–13
e-Miami Heat	36	46	.439	16	18–23	18–23	10–14
e-New York Knicks	30	52	.366	22	19–22	11–30	4–20

Central Division	W	L	PCT	GB	Home	Road	Div
y-Detroit Pistons	50	32	.610	–	26–15	24–17	20–8
x-Charlotte Hornets	44	38	.537	6	21–20	23–18	17–11
x-Toronto Raptors	42	40	.512	8	24–17	18–23	17–11
x-Indiana Pacers	42	40	.512	8	25–16	17–24	13–15
e-Milwaukee Bucks	41	41	.500	9	25–16	16–25	17–11
e-Atlanta Hawks	33	49	.402	17	23–18	10–31	11–17
e-Cleveland Cavaliers	29	53	.354	21	20–21	9–32	12–16
e-Chicago Bulls	21	61	.256	29	14–27	7–34	5–23

Western Conference

Midwest Division	W	L	PCT	GB	Home	Road	Div
y-San Antonio Spurs	58	24	.707	–	32–9	26–15	21–3
x-Dallas Mavericks	57	25	.695	1	30–11	27–14	16–8
x-Minnesota Timberwolves	50	32	.610	8	29–12	21–20	15–9
x-Utah Jazz	44	38	.537	14	25–16	19–22	8–16
e-Houston Rockets	28	54	.341	30	18–23	10–31	9–15
e-Denver Nuggets	27	55	.329	31	20–21	7–34	8–16
e-Memphis Grizzlies	23	59	.280	35	15–26	8–33	7–17

Pacific Division	W	L	PCT	GB	Home	Road	Div
y-Sacramento Kings	61	21	.744	–	36–5	25–16	15–9
x-Los Angeles Lakers	58	24	.707	3	34–7	24–17	16–8
x-Portland Trail Blazers	49	33	.598	12	30–11	19–22	14–10
x-Seattle SuperSonics	45	37	.549	16	26–15	19–22	13–11
e-Los Angeles Clippers	39	43	.476	22	25–16	14–27	9–15
e-Phoenix Suns	36	46	.439	25	23–18	13–28	12–12
e-Golden State Warriors	21	61	.256	40	14–27	7–34	5–19

=== By conference ===
#	Eastern Conference				
#	Team	W	L	PCT	GB
1	c-New Jersey Nets	52	30	.634	–
2	y-Detroit Pistons	50	32	.610	2
3	x-Boston Celtics	49	33	.598	3
4	x-Charlotte Hornets	44	38	.537	8
5	x-Orlando Magic	44	38	.537	8
6	x-Philadelphia 76ers	43	39	.524	9
7	x-Toronto Raptors	42	40	.512	10
8	x-Indiana Pacers	42	40	.512	10
9	e-Milwaukee Bucks	41	41	.500	11
10	e-Washington Wizards	37	45	.451	15
11	e-Miami Heat	36	46	.439	16
12	e-Atlanta Hawks	33	49	.402	19
13	e-New York Knicks	30	52	.366	22
14	e-Cleveland Cavaliers	29	53	.354	23
15	e-Chicago Bulls	21	61	.256	31

#	Western Conference				
#	Team	W	L	PCT	GB
1	z-Sacramento Kings	61	21	.744	–
2	y-San Antonio Spurs	58	24	.707	3
3	x-Los Angeles Lakers	58	24	.707	3
4	x-Dallas Mavericks	57	25	.695	4
5	x-Minnesota Timberwolves	50	32	.610	11
6	x-Portland Trail Blazers	49	33	.598	12
7	x-Seattle SuperSonics	45	37	.549	16
8	x-Utah Jazz	44	38	.537	17
9	e-Los Angeles Clippers	39	43	.476	22
10	e-Phoenix Suns	36	46	.439	25
11	e-Houston Rockets	28	54	.341	33
12	e-Denver Nuggets	27	55	.329	34
13	e-Memphis Grizzlies	23	59	.280	38
14	e-Golden State Warriors	21	61	.256	40

Notes

- z – Clinched home court advantage for the entire playoffs
- c – Clinched home court advantage for the conference playoffs
- y – Clinched division title
- x – Clinched playoff spot
- e – Eliminated from playoff contention

== Playoffs ==
Teams in bold advanced to the next round. The numbers to the left of each team indicate the team's seeding in its conference, and the numbers to the right indicate the number of games the team won in that round. The division champions are marked by an asterisk. Home court advantage does not necessarily belong to the higher-seeded team, but instead the team with the better regular season record; teams enjoying the home advantage are shown in italics.

First Round	Conference Semifinals
**E1**	**New Jersey***	**3**
E8	Indiana	2
**E1**	**New Jersey***	**4**
E4	Charlotte	1
**E4**	**Charlotte**	**3**
E5	Orlando	1
**Eastern Conference**
**E3**	**Boston**	**3**
E6	Philadelphia	2
**E3**	**Boston**	**4**
E2	Detroit*	1
**E2**	**Detroit***	**3**
E7	Toronto	2
**W1**	**Sacramento***	**3**
W8	Utah	1
**W1**	**Sacramento***	**4**
W4	Dallas	1
**W4**	**Dallas**	**3**
W5	Minnesota	0
**Western Conference**
**W3**	**LA Lakers**	**3**
W6	Portland	0
**W3**	**LA Lakers**	**4**
W2	San Antonio*	1
**W2**	**San Antonio***	**3**
W7	Seattle	2

Conference Finals
**E1**	**New Jersey***	**4**
E3	Boston	2
W1	Sacramento*	3
**W3**	**LA Lakers**	**4**

NBA Finals
E1	New Jersey*	0
**W3**	**LA Lakers**	**4**

- * Division winner
- **Bold** Series winner
- Italic Team with home-court advantage

== Statistics leaders ==
Category	Player	Team	Stat
Points per game	Allen Iverson	Philadelphia 76ers	31.4
Rebounds per game	Ben Wallace	Detroit Pistons	13.0
Assists per game	Andre Miller	Cleveland Cavaliers	10.9
Steals per game	Allen Iverson	Philadelphia 76ers	2.8
Blocks per game	Ben Wallace	Detroit Pistons	3.5
FG%	Shaquille O'Neal	Los Angeles Lakers	.579
FT%	Reggie Miller	Indiana Pacers	.911
3FG%	Steve Smith	San Antonio Spurs	.472

== Awards ==
=== Yearly awards ===
- Most Valuable Player: Tim Duncan, San Antonio Spurs
- Rookie of the Year: Pau Gasol, Memphis Grizzlies
- Defensive Player of the Year: Ben Wallace, Detroit Pistons
- Sixth Man of the Year: Corliss Williamson, Detroit Pistons
- Most Improved Player: Jermaine O'Neal, Indiana Pacers
- Coach of the Year: Rick Carlisle, Detroit Pistons
- Executive of the Year: Rod Thorn, New Jersey Nets
- Sportsmanship Award: Steve Smith, San Antonio Spurs

- All-NBA First Team:
  - F – Tracy McGrady, Orlando Magic
  - F – Tim Duncan, San Antonio Spurs
  - C – Shaquille O'Neal, Los Angeles Lakers
  - G – Kobe Bryant, Los Angeles Lakers
  - G – Jason Kidd, New Jersey Nets
- All-NBA Second Team:
  - F – Kevin Garnett, Minnesota Timberwolves
  - F – Chris Webber, Sacramento Kings
  - C – Dirk Nowitzki, Dallas Mavericks
  - G – Gary Payton, Seattle SuperSonics
  - G – Allen Iverson, Philadelphia 76ers
- All-NBA Third Team
  - F – Jermaine O'Neal, Indiana Pacers
  - F – Ben Wallace, Detroit Pistons
  - C – Dikembe Mutombo, Philadelphia 76ers
  - G – Paul Pierce, Boston Celtics
  - G – Steve Nash, Dallas Mavericks

- NBA All-Defensive First Team:
  - F – Tim Duncan, San Antonio Spurs
  - F – Kevin Garnett, Minnesota Timberwolves
  - C – Ben Wallace, Detroit Pistons
  - G – Gary Payton, Seattle SuperSonics
  - G – Jason Kidd, New Jersey Nets
- NBA All-Defensive Second Team
  - F – Clifford Robinson, Detroit Pistons
  - F – Bruce Bowen, San Antonio Spurs
  - C – Dikembe Mutombo, Philadelphia 76ers
  - G – Doug Christie, Sacramento Kings
  - G – Kobe Bryant, Los Angeles Lakers

- NBA All-Rookie First Team:
  - Shane Battier, Memphis Grizzlies
  - Pau Gasol, Memphis Grizzlies
  - Andrei Kirilenko, Utah Jazz
  - Tony Parker, San Antonio Spurs
  - Jason Richardson, Golden State Warriors
- All-Rookie Second Team:
  - Eddie Griffin, Houston Rockets
  - Richard Jefferson, New Jersey Nets
  - Joe Johnson, Phoenix Suns
  - Vladimir Radmanović, Seattle SuperSonics
  - Željko Rebrača, Detroit Pistons
  - Jamaal Tinsley, Indiana Pacers

=== Players of the month ===
The following players were named the Eastern and Western Conference Players of the Month.

Month	Eastern Conference	Western Conference
October – November	Jason Kidd (New Jersey Nets) (1/1)	Kobe Bryant (Los Angeles Lakers) (1/1)
December	Paul Pierce (Boston Celtics) (1/2); Antoine Walker (Boston Celtics) (1/1)	Tim Duncan (San Antonio Spurs) (1/2)
January	Allen Iverson (Philadelphia 76ers) (1/1)	Chris Webber (Sacramento Kings) (1/1)
February	Tracy McGrady (Orlando Magic) (1/1)	Kevin Garnett (Minnesota Timberwolves) (1/1)
March	Ben Wallace (Detroit Pistons) (1/1)	Shawn Marion (Phoenix Suns) (1/1)
April	Paul Pierce (Boston Celtics) (2/2)	Tim Duncan (San Antonio Spurs) (2/2)

=== Rookies of the month ===
The following players were named the Eastern and Western Conference Rookies of the Month.

Month	Eastern Conference	Western Conference
October – November	Jamaal Tinsley (Indiana Pacers) (1/2)	Pau Gasol (Memphis Grizzlies) (1/3)
December	Brendan Haywood (Washington Wizards) (1/1)	Shane Battier (Memphis Grizzlies) (1/1)
January	Richard Jefferson (New Jersey Nets) (1/1)	Pau Gasol (Memphis Grizzlies) (2/3)
February	Trenton Hassell (Chicago Bulls) (1/1)	Jason Richardson (Golden State Warriors) (1/1)
March	Jamaal Tinsley (Indiana Pacers) (2/2)	Pau Gasol (Memphis Grizzlies) (3/3)
April	Željko Rebrača (Detroit Pistons) (1/1)	Gilbert Arenas (Golden State Warriors) (1/1)

=== Coaches of the month ===
The following coaches were named Coaches of the Month.

Month	Coach
October – November	Larry Brown (Philadelphia 76ers) (1/1)
December	Doug Collins (Washington Wizards) (1/1)
January	Rick Adelman (Sacramento Kings) (1/1)
February	Rick Carlisle (Detroit Pistons) (1/1)
March	Gregg Popovich (San Antonio Spurs) (1/1)
April	Lenny Wilkens (Toronto Raptors) (1/1)

== See also ==
- List of NBA regular season records
