= List of Miami Heat broadcasters =

Matches played by the American basketball team Miami Heat have been broadcast since its founding in 1988. Radio commentaries have been broadcast in English and Spanish: the English commentaries have been broadcast on the WAXY channel since 2011, and those in Spanish on WQBA since 2004. Matches have been televised on Sun Sports and its predecessors. The teams of commentators include a play-by-play commentator, a color commentator, a courtside reporter, and a studio host.

== Television ==
=== 2010s ===
Year	Channel	Play-by-play	Color commentator(s)	Courtside reporter	Studio host	Studio analysts
2019-20	Sun Sports	Eric Reid	John Crotty	Kristen Hewitt or Will Manso	Kristen Hewitt or Jason Jackson or Will Manso	
2018-19	Sun Sports	Eric Reid	John Crotty	Kristen Hewitt or Will Manso	Kristen Hewitt or Jason Jackson or Will Manso	
2017-18	Sun Sports	Eric Reid	Tony Fiorentino	Kristen Hewitt or Will Manso	Jason Jackson	John Crotty, Ron Rothstein
2016–17	Sun Sports	Eric Reid	Tony Fiorentino	Kristen Hewitt or Jason Jackson or Will Manso	Kristen Hewitt or Jason Jackson or Will Manso	
2015–16	Sun Sports	Eric Reid	Tony Fiorentino	Kristen Hewitt or Jason Jackson or Will Manso	Kristen Hewitt or Jason Jackson or Will Manso	
2014–15	Sun Sports	Eric Reid	Tony Fiorentino	Kristen Hewitt or Jason Jackson or Will Manso	Kristen Hewitt or Jason Jackson or Will Manso	
2013–14	Sun Sports	Eric Reid	Tony Fiorentino	Kristen Hewitt or Jason Jackson or Will Manso	Kristen Hewitt or Jason Jackson or Will Manso	
2012–13	Sun Sports	Eric Reid	Tony Fiorentino	Johanna Gomez or Jason Jackson	Johanna Gomez or Jason Jackson	
2011–12	Sun Sports	Eric Reid	Tony Fiorentino	Johanna Gomez or Jason Jackson	Johanna Gomez or Jason Jackson	
2010–11	Sun Sports	Eric Reid	Tony Fiorentino	Johanna Gomez or Jason Jackson	Johanna Gomez or Jason Jackson	

=== 2000s ===
Year	Channel	Play-by-play	Color commentator(s)	Courtside reporter	Studio host	Studio analysts
2009–10	Sun Sports	Eric Reid	Tony Fiorentino	Jason Jackson	Jason Jackson	
2008–09	Sun Sports	Eric Reid	Tony Fiorentino	Jason Jackson	Jason Jackson	
2007–08	Sun Sports	Eric Reid	Tony Fiorentino	Jason Jackson	Jason Jackson	
2006–07	Sun Sports	Eric Reid	Tony Fiorentino	Jason Jackson	Jason Jackson	
2005–06	Sun Sports	Eric Reid	Tony Fiorentino	Jason Jackson	Jason Jackson	
2004–05	Sun Sports/Sunshine Network	Eric Reid	Mike Fratello or Tony Fiorentino	Jason Jackson	Jason Jackson	
2003–04	Sunshine Network, WBFS-TV, and WFOR-TV	Eric Reid	Mike Fratello	Jason Jackson	Jason Jackson	
2002–03	Sunshine Network, WBFS-TV, and WFOR-TV	Eric Reid	Mike Fratello			
2001–02	Sunshine Network, WBFS-TV, and WFOR-TV	Eric Reid	Ed Pinckney			
2000–01	Sunshine Network, WBFS-TV, and WFOR-TV	Eric Reid	Ed Pinckney	Mark Jones	Mark Jones	Tony Fiorentino

=== 1990s ===
Year	Channel	Play-by-play	Color commentator(s)	Courtside reporter	Studio host	Studio analysts
1999–00	Sunshine Network	Eric Reid	Jack Ramsay	Dave LaMont	Dave LaMont	Tony Fiorentino
	WAMI-TV	Eric Reid	Ed Pinckney	Tim Ring	Tim Ring	Tony Fiorentino
1998–99	Sunshine Network	Eric Reid	Jack Ramsay	Dave LaMont	Dave LaMont	
	WAMI-TV	Eric Reid	Ed Pinckney	Dave LaMont	Dave LaMont	
1997–98	Sunshine Network and WBFS-TV	Eric Reid	Jack Ramsay	Dave LaMont	Dave LaMont	
1996–97	Sunshine Network and WBFS-TV	Eric Reid	Jack Ramsay	Dave LaMont	Dave LaMont	
1995–96	Sunshine Network and WBFS-TV	Eric Reid	Jack Ramsay	Dave LaMont	Dave LaMont	
1994–95	Sunshine Network and WBFS-TV	Eric Reid	Jack Ramsay	Dave LaMont	Dave LaMont	
1993–94	Sunshine Network	Eric Reid	Jack Ramsay	Dave LaMont	Dave LaMont	
	WBFS-TV	Eric Reid	Jack Ramsay	Joe Zagacki	Joe Zagacki	
1992–93	Sunshine Network	Eric Reid	Jack Ramsay	Dave LaMont	Dave LaMont	
	WBFS-TV	Eric Reid	Jack Ramsay			
1991–92	SportsChannel Florida	Eric Reid	Dave Wohl		Joe Zagacki	
	WBFS-TV	Eric Reid	Dave Wohl			
1990–91	SportsChannel Florida and WBFS-TV	Sam Smith	Eric Reid			

=== 1980s ===
Year	Channel	Play-by-play	Color commentator(s)	Courtside reporter	Studio host	Studio analysts
1989–90	SportsChannel Florida and WBFS-TV	Sam Smith	Eric Reid			
1988–89	SportsChannel Florida and WBFS-TV	Sam Smith	Eric Reid			

== English radio ==
=== 2010s ===
Year	Flagship Station	Play-by-play	Color commentator(s)	Studio host
2015–16	WAXY	Mike Inglis	John Crotty	Jonathan Zaslow
2014–15	WAXY	Mike Inglis	John Crotty	Jonathan Zaslow
2013–14	WAXY	Mike Inglis	John Crotty	Jonathan Zaslow
2012–13	WAXY	Mike Inglis	John Crotty	Jonathan Zaslow
2011–12	WAXY	Mike Inglis	John Crotty	Jonathan Zaslow
2010–11	WIOD	Mike Inglis	John Crotty	Jonathan Zaslow

=== 2000s ===
Year	Flagship Station	Play-by-play	Color commentator(s)	Studio host
2009–10	WIOD	Mike Inglis	John Crotty	Jeremy Marks-Peltz
2008–09	WIOD	Mike Inglis	John Crotty	Jeremy Marks-Peltz
2007–08	WIOD	Mike Inglis	John Crotty	Jeremy Marks-Peltz
2006–07	WIOD	Mike Inglis	John Crotty	Jorge Sedano
2005–06	WIOD	Mike Inglis	John Crotty	Jorge Sedano
2004–05	WIOD	Mike Inglis	John Crotty	Jorge Sedano
2003–04	WIOD	Mike Inglis	Tony Fiorentino	Jason Solodkin
2002–03	WIOD	Mike Inglis	Ed Pinckney (Home Games Only)	Jason Solodkin
2001–02	WIOD	Mike Inglis	Ed Pinckney (Home Games Only)	Phil Latzman
2000–01	WIOD	Mike Inglis	Ed Pinckney (Home Games Only)	Phil Latzman

=== 1990s ===
Year	Flagship Station	Play-by-play	Color commentator(s)	Studio host
1999–00	WIOD	Mike Inglis	Ed Pinckney (Home Games Only)	Phil Latzman
1998–99	WIOD	Mike Inglis	Ed Pinckney (Home Games Only)	Phil Latzman
1997–98	WIOD	David Halberstam	Ed Pinckney (Home Games Only)	Phil Latzman
1996–97	WIOD	David Halberstam	Ed Pinckney (Home Games Only)	
1995–96	WINZ	David Halberstam		
1994–95	WINZ	David Halberstam		
1993–94	WINZ	David Halberstam		
1992–93	WQAM	David Halberstam		
1991–92	WQAM	Eric Reid	Dave Wohl	
1990–91	WQAM	Sam Smith	Eric Reid	

=== 1980s ===
Year	Flagship Station	Play-by-play	Color commentator(s)	Studio host
1989–90	WQAM	Sam Smith	Eric Reid	
1988–89	WQAM	Sam Smith	Eric Reid	

== Spanish radio ==
=== 2010s ===
Year	Flagship Station	Play-by-play	Color commentator(s)
2015–16	WQBA	Jose Paneda	Joe Pujala
2014–15	WQBA	Jose Paneda	Joe Pujala
2013–14	WQBA	Jose Paneda	Joe Pujala
2012–13	WQBA	Jose Paneda	Joe Pujala
2011–12	WQBA	Jose Paneda	Joe Pujala
2010–11	WQBA	Jose Paneda	Joe Pujala

=== 2000s ===
Year	Flagship Station	Play-by-play	Color commentator(s)
2009–10	WQBA	Jose Paneda	Joe Pujala
2008–09	WQBA	Jose Paneda	Joe Pujala
2007–08	WQBA	Jose Paneda	Joe Pujala
2006–07	WQBA	Jose Paneda	Joe Pujala
2005–06	WQBA	Jose Paneda	Joe Pujala
2004–05	WQBA	Jose Paneda	Joe Pujala
2003–04	WACC	Jose Paneda	
2002–03	WACC	Jose Paneda	
2001–02	WACC	Jose Paneda	
2000–01	WACC	Jose Paneda	

=== 1990s ===
Year	Flagship Station	Play-by-play	Color commentator
1999–00	WACC	Jose Paneda	
1998–99	WACC	Jose Paneda	
1997–98	WACC	Jose Paneda	
1996–97	WXTO	Jose Paneda	
1995–96	WRFM	Jose Paneda	
1994–95	WRFM	Jose Paneda	
1993–94	WRFM	Jose Paneda	
1992–93	WRFM	Jose Paneda	
1991–92	WRFM	Jose Paneda	Jorge Cunill
1990–91	WRFM	Jose Paneda	Jorge Cunill

=== 1980s ===
Year	Flagship Station	Play-by-play	Color commentator
1989–90	WAQI	Sarvelio del Valle	Jose Paneda
1988–89	WAQI	Sarvelio del Valle	Jose Paneda

== See also ==
- List of current National Basketball Association broadcasters

== Notes ==
- The Sunshine Network became Sun Sports during the 2004–05 NBA season.
- When Mike Fratello called games for the NBA on TNT, Ed Pinckney and Tony Fiorentino were used as a fill-ins.
- Tony Fiorentino replaced Mike Fratello during the 2004–05 NBA season after Fratello became the Memphis Grizzlies head coach.
