= Jorge Sedano =

American sportscaster

- Born: September 2, 1977 (age 49); New York City, U.S.
- Education: Florida International
- Occupations: Sports media, sports radio host, sports television personality/anchor/reporter
- Employer: ESPN

Jorge Sedano is an American sports broadcaster and talk show host. He began his career in 1999 and is currently a radio and television personality at ESPN.

== Background ==
Jorge was born in New York and raised in Miami, Florida. He attended Monsignor Edward Pace High School and Florida International University. He interned at CBS Sportsline and Westwood One Radio, where he worked under Scott Kaplan and Sid Rosenberg.

== Radio career ==
=== Early career ===
Jorge Sedano, began his career in 1999 as a host/update anchor/producer at WAFN-AM 1700 The Fan in Miami. He hosted a midday sports show with John DeCandido as well as hosting a weekend pro wrestling show at the height of the industry's "Monday Night War". At The Fan, Jorge was the lead-in show for former nationally syndicated sports talk host John Renshaw.

In 2001, Sedano moved to Clear Channel's Miami sports talk station WRFX-AM 940 Fox Sports (now WINZ-AM), where he got his first chance at hosting a drive time show. He was quickly handed the reins of the station's afternoon drive show, Sports Talk South Florida.

=== Fox Sports Radio Network ===
In February 2004, Sedano was given an opportunity to host a late night national weekend show on Fox Sports Radio Network. Five months later, after the departure of their overnight weekday host Jim Daniels, FSR auditioned Sedano as a possible replacement.

In August 2004, Sedano was named the host of the weekday overnight show, The Third Shift on Fox with Jorge Sedano. Despite Fox Sports Radio's programming originating out of Los Angeles, Sedano's show mostly originated out of a studio in Miami (due to his duties with the Miami Heat Radio Network). At that time he was known as, "The Dean" of late-night sports talk. During his tenure, his show was the most cleared show, in late night syndicated sports radio. Jorge hosted The Third Shift on Fox until September 2007. He left the position to take a weekday job in his hometown of Miami, at WAXY 790 The Ticket. Sedano continued to host weekend specialty shows for Fox Sports Radio Network through 2009.

=== Miami Heat Radio Network ===
Beginning in 2004, while Sedano was working on Fox Sports Radio, he was also the host of the Miami Heat Radio Network on 610 WIOD-AM. Sedano's opportunity to host the teams radio network coincided with Miami's trade for Shaquille O'Neal. Sedano was the studio host on radio for three seasons, beginning with the 2004–2005 season through the 2006–2007 season and including the NBA Championship year of the 2005-06 Miami Heat season.

During his time on the radio broadcasts, he worked with play by play voice Mike Inglis, and analysts John Crotty and Tony Fiorentino.

=== 790 The Ticket ===
Sedano returned home full-time, to work at Miami's WAXY AM 790 The Ticket. His show on WAXY was called The Jorge Sedano Show.

While at The Ticket, he hosted several different time slots. He began his career at The Ticket hosting two midday slots over the course of two years. The first was 10am-1pm where he beat South Florida ratings king Neil Rogers and Noon-3pm, where he was the lead in to the Dan Le Batard show.

Later in 2009, he was named the morning show host. The show aired weekday mornings from 6am-10am. Within one year, Sedano's show became the highest rated morning sports show in Miami.

On April 10, 2012, Sedano announced on his Twitter account that he was leaving his morning radio show. At that time, Sedano announced that he was leaving to pursue other projects in the media industry.

=== 560 WQAM ===
It was announced on August 30, 2012, that Sedano would join WQAM. He was named program director and afternoon drive host (3pm-7pm).

=== ESPN Radio ===
On July 15, 2013, it was reported that Sedano would leave his positions as program director and afternoon talk show host at WQAM to join ESPN Radio. At ESPN Radio he hosted The Sedano Show from 7pm-9pm ET.

On March 25, 2015, it was reported that Sedano would join Bomani Jones and Freddie Coleman as part of a restructured ESPN Radio lineup. In 2016, Sedano began co-hosting mornings with Keyshawn Johnson and LZ Granderson on Los Angeles ESPN affiliate KSPN. Sedano moved to afternoons in 2018 and to early evenings in August 2019. As of February 2020, he is heard from 10 AM to noon. In August 2020, Sedano will begin hosting late afternoons with LZ Granderson.

== Television career ==
=== CBS 4 WFOR-TV ===
In November 2010, Jorge was added as third sports anchor for CBS 4 WFOR-TV. He continued in that role at the CBS O&O through August 2012.

=== Fox Sports/Sun Sports ===
It was announced on August 30, that Sedano would be the studio host for Sun Sports Miami Heat road telecasts. He hosted the studio with John Crotty throughout the 2012-13 NBA Season.

=== ESPN ===
On September 6, 2013, it was announced by ESPN, Sedano would become a full-time host on ESPN Radio. In addition to his new role on ESPN Radio, Sedano will contribute to SportsCenter and other ESPN studio programming.

=== Other previous TV work ===
In 2008, Sedano also appeared on a reality TV show Model Latina as a judge for the show's second season in Miami.

From 2010 to 2012, Sedano was a regular contributor to the NFL Network's Top 10 show.

In 2012, he hosted a fantasy baseball show for CBSSports.com.

== Play-by-play ==
Jorge served on the Florida International University football broadcast team for the 2009 & 2010 seasons.

During the NBA Lockout, Sedano was selected to the television broadcast of the South Florida Charity All Star Classic. A charity basketball game, that aired on WBFS-TV My TV 33 (Miami), was held on October 8, 2011, and was hosted by LeBron James, Dwyane Wade, Chris Bosh, along with Isiah Thomas and the FIU Athletic Department. Both teams that competed in the event were manned by some of the biggest stars in the NBA. Sedano, handled play by play duties, along with pre game interviews with the NBA stars.

== Print ==
For two years beginning in 2010, Sedano served as a contributor for The Miami Herald sports section.

== Awards and recognition ==
In 2004, Sedano was a finalist for the Florida Associated Press Radio Sportscaster of the Year Award.

In 2010, Jorge was Miami's Best AM Radio Personality awarded to him by the Miami New Times.

In 2012, Jorge Sedano was named one of the Top 20 Professionals Under the Age of 40 by the Miami publication Brickell Magazine.
