= 1998–99 Miami Heat season =

NBA professional basketball team season

- Division champions
- Head coach: Pat Riley
- President: Pat Riley
- General manager: Randy Pfund
- Owner: Micky Arison
- Arena: Miami Arena

Results
- Record: 33–17 (.660)
- Place: Division: 1st (Atlantic); Conference: 1st (Eastern)
- Playoff finish: First round (lost to Knicks 2–3)
- Stats at Basketball Reference

Local media
- Television: WAMI-TV (Eric Reid, Ed Pinckney); Sunshine Network (Eric Reid, Jack Ramsay)
- Radio: WIOD (Mike Inglis, Ed Pinckney); WACC (Spanish) (Jose Paneda)

The 1998–99 Miami Heat season was the 11th season for the Miami Heat in the National Basketball Association. Due to a lockout, the regular season began on February 5, 1999, and was cut from 82 games to 50.

== Season summary ==
=== Off-season ===
During the off-season, the Heat signed free agents Terry Porter, Clarence Weatherspoon, and later on signed Blue Edwards in February.

=== Regular season ===
With the addition of Porter and Weatherspoon, the Heat struggled losing three of their first four games of the regular season, but the posted a seven-game winning streak afterwards. The team posted a six-game winning streak in March, and another six-game winning streak in April. Despite Jamal Mashburn only playing just 24 games due to a left knee injury, and Voshon Lenard only appearing in just twelve games due to a stress fracture in his left leg, the Heat finished in first place in the Atlantic Division with a 33–17 record, and earned the first seed in the Eastern Conference.

Alonzo Mourning averaged 20.1 points, 11.0 rebounds and 3.9 blocks per game, and was named the NBA Defensive Player of the Year; he was also named to the All-NBA First Team, and to the NBA All-Defensive First Team. In addition, Tim Hardaway averaged 17.2 points and 7.3 assists per game, led the Heat with 112 three-point field goals, and was named to the All-NBA Second Team, while Mashburn provided the team with 14.8 points per game, P.J. Brown provided with 11.4 points and 6.9 rebounds per game, and was named to the NBA All-Defensive Second Team, and Dan Majerle, who became the team's starting shooting guard, contributed 7.0 points per game and 68 three-point field goals. Off the bench, Porter contributed 10.5 points per game, and Weatherspoon averaged 8.1 points and 5.0 rebounds per game.

Mourning also finished in second place in Most Valuable Player voting, behind Karl Malone of the Utah Jazz; Mourning finished with 36 first-place votes, while Malone had 44 first-place votes. Meanwhile, Porter finished tied in fifth place in Sixth Man of the Year voting, and head coach Pat Riley finished in fifth place in Coach of the Year voting. The Heat finished 23rd in the NBA in home-game attendance, with an attendance of 378,813 at the Miami Arena during the regular season.

=== NBA playoffs ===
In the Eastern Conference First Round of the 1999 NBA playoffs, and for the third consecutive year, the Heat faced off against the 8th–seeded New York Knicks, a team that featured All-Star center Patrick Ewing, Allan Houston, and sixth man Latrell Sprewell. The Knicks took a 2–1 series lead, but the Heat managed to win Game 4 on the road, 87–72 at Madison Square Garden to even the series. However, the Heat lost Game 5 to the Knicks at home, 78–77 at the Miami Arena, in which Houston hit a memorable game-winning buzzer-beater, as the Knicks defeated the Heat in a hard-fought five-game series. With this loss, the Heat became the second number one seed in league history to lose an NBA playoffs series against a number eight seed.

The Knicks would become the first #8 seed to advance to the NBA Finals, but would lose to the San Antonio Spurs in five games in the 1999 NBA Finals. The Heat would later on accomplish the deed themselves by defeating the top–seeded Milwaukee Bucks in the opening round of the 2023 NBA playoffs, becoming the second eighth-seed to advance to the NBA Finals.

=== Aftermath ===
This was also the Heat's final full season in which they played their home games at the Miami Arena. Following the season, Porter signed as a free agent with the San Antonio Spurs, while Terry Mills re-signed with his former team, the Detroit Pistons, and Edwards, and long-time Heat forward Keith Askins were both released to free agency.

== Offseason ==
=== Draft picks ===
Round	Pick	Player	Position	Nationality	School/Club team
2	51	Corey Brewer	Guard	United States	University of Oklahoma

== Roster ==
1998–99 Miami Heat roster
Players

Pos.	No.	Player	Height	Weight	DOB	From
F	2	Keith Askins	6 ft 7 in (2.01 m)	197 lb (89 kg)	1967–12–15	Alabama
F/C	42	P. J. Brown	6 ft 11 in (2.11 m)	225 lb (102 kg)	1969–10–14	Louisiana Tech
C	31	Duane Causwell	7 ft 0 in (2.13 m)	240 lb (109 kg)	1968–05–31	Temple
F/C	40	Marty Conlon	6 ft 10 in (2.08 m)	224 lb (102 kg)	1968–01–19	Providence
G/F	32	Blue Edwards	6 ft 4 in (1.93 m)	200 lb (91 kg)	1965–10–31	East Carolina
G	10	Tim Hardaway	6 ft 0 in (1.83 m)	175 lb (79 kg)	1966–09–01	UTEP
G/F	21	Voshon Lenard	6 ft 4 in (1.93 m)	205 lb (93 kg)	1973–05–14	Minnesota
G/F	9	Dan Majerle	6 ft 6 in (1.98 m)	215 lb (98 kg)	1965–09–09	Central Michigan
F	24	Jamal Mashburn	6 ft 8 in (2.03 m)	240 lb (109 kg)	1972–11–29	Kentucky
F/C	6	Terry Mills	6 ft 10 in (2.08 m)	230 lb (104 kg)	1967–12–21	Michigan
C	33	Alonzo Mourning	6 ft 10 in (2.08 m)	240 lb (109 kg)	1970–02–08	Georgetown
G	30	Terry Porter	6 ft 3 in (1.91 m)	195 lb (88 kg)	1963–04–08	UW–Stevens Point
F	5	Mark Strickland	6 ft 9 in (2.06 m)	210 lb (95 kg)	1970–07–14	Temple
G	23	Rex Walters	6 ft 4 in (1.93 m)	190 lb (86 kg)	1970–03–12	Kansas
F	35	Clarence Weatherspoon	6 ft 6 in (1.98 m)	240 lb (109 kg)	1970–09–08	Southern Miss

Coaches
Head coach
- Pat Riley
Assistant(s)
- Jeff Bzdelik
- Tony Fiorentino
- Bill Foran
- Bob McAdoo
- Erik Spoelstra
- Stan Van Gundy

Legend
- (DP) Unsigned draft pick
- (FA) Free agent
- (S) Suspended
- Injured

Roster
Updated: February 19, 1999

== Regular season ==
=== Season standings ===
Atlantic Division	W	L	PCT	GB	Home	Road	Div	GP
c-Miami Heat	33	17	.660	–	18‍–‍7	15‍–‍10	12–8	50
x-Orlando Magic	33	17	.660	–	21‍–‍4	12‍–‍13	12–6	50
x-Philadelphia 76ers	28	22	.560	5.0	17‍–‍8	11‍–‍14	9–10	50
x-New York Knicks	27	23	.540	6.0	19‍–‍6	8‍–‍17	12–8	50
Boston Celtics	19	31	.380	14.0	10‍–‍15	9‍–‍16	10–9	50
Washington Wizards	18	32	.360	15.0	13‍–‍12	5‍–‍20	6–13	50
New Jersey Nets	16	34	.320	17.0	12‍–‍13	4‍–‍21	6–13	50

Eastern Conference
#	Team	W	L	PCT	GB	GP
1	c-Miami Heat *	33	17	.660	–	50
2	y-Indiana Pacers *	33	17	.660	–	50
3	x-Orlando Magic	33	17	.660	–	50
4	x-Atlanta Hawks	31	19	.620	2.0	50
5	x-Detroit Pistons	29	21	.580	4.0	50
6	x-Philadelphia 76ers	28	22	.560	5.0	50
7	x-Milwaukee Bucks	28	22	.560	5.0	50
8	x-New York Knicks	27	23	.540	6.0	50
9	Charlotte Hornets	26	24	.520	7.0	50
10	Toronto Raptors	23	27	.460	10.0	50
11	Cleveland Cavaliers	22	28	.440	11.0	50
12	Boston Celtics	19	31	.380	14.0	50
13	Washington Wizards	18	32	.360	15.0	50
14	New Jersey Nets	16	34	.320	17.0	50
15	Chicago Bulls	13	37	.260	20.0	50

z - clinched division title
y - clinched division title
x - clinched playoff spot

== Playoffs ==
1999 playoff game log
First round: 2–3 (home: 1–1; road: 1–2)

Game	Date	Team	Score	High points	High rebounds	High assists	Location Attendance	Series
1	May 8	New York	L 75–95	Alonzo Mourning (27)	Dan Majerle (10)	Tim Hardaway (3)	Miami Arena; 15,036	0–1
2	May 10	New York	W 83–73	Alonzo Mourning (26)	Majerle, Mourning (8)	Tim Hardaway (11)	Miami Arena; 15,200	1–1
3	May 12	@ New York	L 73–97	Alonzo Mourning (18)	P. J. Brown (8)	Tim Hardaway (5)	Madison Square Garden; 19,763	1–2
4	May 14	@ New York	W 87–72	Mourning, Porter (16)	Alonzo Mourning (13)	Terry Porter (7)	Madison Square Garden; 19,763	2–2
5	May 16	New York	L 77–78	Alonzo Mourning (21)	P. J. Brown (12)	Tim Hardaway (8)	Miami Arena; 14,985	2–3

1999 schedule

== Player statistics ==
=== Regular season ===
Player	POS	GP	GS	MP	REB	AST	STL	BLK	PTS	MPG	RPG	APG	SPG	BPG	PPG
P. J. Brown	PF	50	50	1,611	346	66	46	48	571	32.2	6.9	1.3	.9	1.0	11.4
Terry Porter	PG	50	1	1,365	140	146	48	11	525	27.3	2.8	2.9	1.0	.2	10.5
Clarence Weatherspoon	SF	49	3	1,040	243	34	28	17	397	21.2	5.0	.7	.6	.3	8.1
Tim Hardaway	PG	48	48	1,772	152	352	57	6	835	36.9	3.2	7.3	1.2	.1	17.4
Dan Majerle	SG	48	48	1,624	208	150	38	7	337	33.8	4.3	3.1	.8	.1	7.0
Alonzo Mourning	C	46	46	1,753	507	74	34	180	924	38.1	11.0	1.6	.7	3.9	20.1
Rex Walters	SG	33	13	506	50	58	10	3	101	15.3	1.5	1.8	.3	.1	3.1
Keith Askins	SF	33	13	415	44	10	17	3	53	12.6	1.3	.3	.5	.1	1.6
Mark Strickland	PF	32	1	357	78	9	7	8	119	11.2	2.4	.3	.2	.3	3.7
Jamal Mashburn	SF	24	23	855	146	75	20	3	356	35.6	6.1	3.1	.8	.1	14.8
Blue Edwards	SF	24	0	283	33	30	17	5	77	11.8	1.4	1.3	.7	.2	3.2
Duane Causwell	C	19	1	137	35	2	0	11	44	7.2	1.8	.1	.0	.6	2.3
Voshon Lenard	SG	12	2	190	16	10	3	1	82	15.8	1.3	.8	.3	.1	6.8
Marty Conlon	C	7	0	35	5	1	0	1	8	5.0	.7	.1	.0	.1	1.1
Mark Davis	SF	4	1	35	7	1	1	0	9	8.8	1.8	.3	.3	.0	2.3
Jamie Watson	SF	3	0	18	1	1	0	0	2	6.0	.3	.3	.0	.0	.7
Terry Mills	PF	1	0	29	4	0	1	0	9	29.0	4.0	.0	1.0	.0	9.0

=== Playoffs ===
Player	POS	GP	GS	MP	REB	AST	STL	BLK	PTS	MPG	RPG	APG	SPG	BPG	PPG
Alonzo Mourning	C	5	5	194	41	4	8	14	108	38.8	8.2	.8	1.6	2.8	21.6
Tim Hardaway	PG	5	5	182	14	32	5	1	45	36.4	2.8	6.4	1.0	.2	9.0
Jamal Mashburn	SF	5	5	152	13	10	2	0	50	30.4	2.6	2.0	.4	.0	10.0
Dan Majerle	SG	5	5	152	29	6	5	2	20	30.4	5.8	1.2	1.0	.4	4.0
P. J. Brown	PF	5	5	144	31	5	2	2	51	28.8	6.2	1.0	.4	.4	10.2
Terry Porter	PG	5	0	139	19	15	3	0	45	27.8	3.8	3.0	.6	.0	9.0
Clarence Weatherspoon	SF	5	0	112	21	2	7	1	29	22.4	4.2	.4	1.4	.2	5.8
Voshon Lenard	SG	4	0	57	1	3	0	1	37	14.3	.3	.8	.0	.3	9.3
Keith Askins	SF	4	0	27	4	0	2	1	0	6.8	1.0	.0	.5	.3	.0
Duane Causwell	C	4	0	20	2	1	1	0	6	5.0	.5	.3	.3	.0	1.5
Rex Walters	SG	3	0	13	0	4	0	0	0	4.3	.0	1.3	.0	.0	.0
Mark Strickland	PF	2	0	8	3	0	1	0	4	4.0	1.5	.0	.5	.0	2.0

== Awards and records ==
- Alonzo Mourning, NBA Defensive Player of the Year Award
- Alonzo Mourning, All-NBA First Team
- Alonzo Mourning, NBA All-Defensive First Team
- Tim Hardaway, All-NBA Second Team
- P.J. Brown, NBA All-Defensive Second Team
