= Mike Inglis =

Mike Inglis or Michael Inglis may refer to:

- Mike Inglis (gymnast), Canadian gymnast
- Mike Inglis (sportscaster), Canadian sportscaster
