= P. J. Brown =

American basketball player (born 1969)

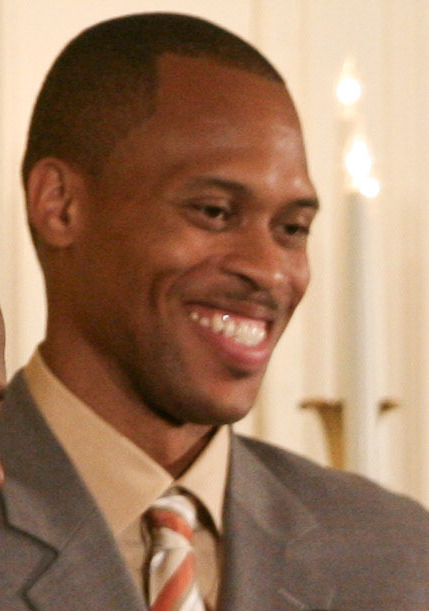
- Brown in 2008

Personal information
- Born: October 14, 1969 (age 57) Detroit, Michigan, U.S.
- Listed height: 6 ft 11 in (2.11 m)
- Listed weight: 239 lb (108 kg)

Career information
- High school: Winnfield (Winnfield, Louisiana)
- College: Louisiana Tech (1988–1992)
- NBA draft: 1992: 2nd round, 29th overall pick
- Drafted by: New Jersey Nets
- Playing career: 1992–2008
- Position: Center / power forward
- Number: 42, 93

Career history
- 1992–1993: Panionios
- 1993–1996: New Jersey Nets
- 1996–2000: Miami Heat
- 2000–2002: Charlotte Hornets
- 2002–2006: New Orleans Hornets (Note: During the 2005–06 and 2006–07 seasons, the team was known as the New Orleans/Oklahoma City Hornets during their temporary relocation to Oklahoma City due to Hurricane Katrina.)
- 2006–2007: Chicago Bulls
- 2008: Boston Celtics

Career highlights
- NBA champion (2008); 3× NBA All-Defensive Second Team (1997, 1999, 2001)

Career NBA statistics
- Points: 9,870 (9.1 ppg)
- Rebounds: 8,409 (7.7 rpg)
- Blocks: 1,116 (1.0 bpg)
- Stats at NBA.com
- Stats at Basketball Reference

Collier "P. J." Brown Jr. (born October 14, 1969) is an American former professional basketball player who played in the National Basketball Association (NBA). The 6 ft 11 in (2.11 m), 239 lb (108 kg) center/power forward was selected out of Louisiana Tech University by the New Jersey Nets with the 29th overall pick in the 1992 NBA draft, but began his NBA career only in the 1993–94 season. He was voted into the NBA All-Defensive Second Team three times, in 1997, 1999 and 2001, and won the NBA Sportsmanship Award in 2004. He attended Winnfield Senior High School in Winnfield, Louisiana, where he played for the Winnfield Tigers, and has played professionally for the Nets, Miami Heat, Charlotte Hornets, New Orleans Hornets, Chicago Bulls and Boston Celtics. Brown retired from the NBA after winning an NBA championship with the Celtics in 2008.

== College ==
Brown played four years at Louisiana Tech and averaged 10.1 points and 8.4 rebounds per game in 121 contests. He left Louisiana Tech as the Bulldogs' second all-time leader in blocks with 241, and fifth in rebounds with 1,017.

== NBA career ==
=== New Jersey Nets (1993–1996) ===
Brown was selected out of Louisiana Tech University with the 29th overall pick in the second round of the 1992 NBA draft by the New Jersey Nets. However, he elected to play in the 1992–93 HEBA A1 season in his first year out of college and averaged 17.0 points, 13.3 rebounds and 3.2 blocks per game for Panionios B.C.

In his first three seasons in the NBA, from 1993 to 1996, he played in 240 regular season games for the Nets and increased his starts from 54 games in the 1994 season to 63 in the 1995 season before starting in all 81 games that he appeared in the 1996 campaign. The Nets made the playoffs in 1994, and Brown appeared in four first round playoff games as New Jersey was eliminated by the New York Knicks. That season also featured Brown participating in the 1994 Rookie Challenge during NBA All-Star Weekend.

In addition to increasing his playing time Brown also increased his scoring average each year, and in the 1996 season he would average a then career high 11.3 points with 6.9 rebounds a game. The Nets however did not reach the post-season in both his second and third year with the team. In the 1996 off-season he would sign as a free agent with the Miami Heat.

=== Miami Heat (1996–2000) ===
Miami had made the playoffs the previous year led by all-star center Alonzo Mourning, point guard Tim Hardaway and head coach Pat Riley, who decided to start Brown for 71 games in the 1996–97 season. Brown increased his shooting percentage and rebounding, received the J. Walter Kennedy Citizenship Award and was named to the NBA All-Defensive Second Team as the Heat won a franchise best 61 games and the Atlantic Division Title. Brown's defense and rebounding helped the Heat advance in the playoffs, as they defeated the Orlando Magic in the first round in 5 games and New York Knicks in a grueling 7 games series. He came up big in the crucial games of the playoffs, scoring 12 points with 14 rebounds in the deciding game against Orlando and 18 points with 12 rebounds in a game 5 win at home against the Knicks. In that game, Brown was attempting to establish rebounding position with Knicks point guard Charlie Ward before lifting and flipping him onto a row of photographers along the baseline, leading to a brawl between the teams. This would result in Brown being suspended for the last two games of the series, along with players from the New York bench who intervened. Despite overcoming New York, the team could not overcome the defending champion Chicago Bulls, who defeated Miami in 5 games in the franchise's first trip to the Eastern Conference Finals. Brown averaged 9.2 points and 8.8 rebounds in the playoffs.

Starting in all 74 games in which he appeared, Brown posted nearly identical production in the 1997–98 season as the Heat once again entered the playoffs but came up short in a five-game first round loss against New York .

In the lockout shortened 1998–99 season, Brown was named to the NBA All-Defensive Second Team for the second time in his career and averaged a career high 11.4 points a game. The Heat once again won the Atlantic Division but also were once again defeated in a stunning first round series in 5 games to the eighth-seeded Knicks. Brown's role continued in the 1999–2000 season, and the Heat would win in the first round against the Detroit Pistons before facing the Knicks for the fourth straight year. Once again, the Heat would fall to their New York rivals in another long and grueling 7-game series.

=== Charlotte / New Orleans Hornets (2000–2006) ===
On August 1, 2000, Brown, alongside Jamal Mashburn, Otis Thorpe, Tim James and Rodney Buford, was traded to the Charlotte Hornets in exchange for Eddie Jones, Anthony Mason, Dale Ellis and Ricky Davis. In 2000–01, his first season with the Hornets, Brown was selected to his third NBA All-Defensive Second Team. In 2001–02, he was chosen as the Central Division recipient of the NBA Sportsmanship Award. The Hornets relocated to New Orleans prior to the 2002–03 season, where Brown had his best scoring seasons, averaging 10.6 points per game in 240 regular season games from 2002 to 2005.

During the 2002–03 season, he received the NBA Community Assist Award for the month of September and was again chosen as the Central Division recipient of the NBA Sportsmanship Award, for the second consecutive time. In 2003–04, he was yet again chosen as the Central Division NBA Sportsmanship Award recipient, for the third consecutive season, this time capturing the 2004 NBA Sportsmanship Award.

Prior to the 2006–07 season, Brown had played in 999 regular season games, including 941 starts. By that time, he was one of 26 players in NBA history to have 8,000 points, 7,000 rebounds, 1,000 assists and 1,000 blocks.

=== Chicago Bulls (2006–2007) ===
On July 13, 2006, Brown was traded by the New Orleans/Oklahoma City Hornets along with J. R. Smith to the Chicago Bulls in exchange for Tyson Chandler. He played well as a veteran with the young team, starting the majority of his games, though he scored in meager proportions, and only averaged a career-low of 20.2 minutes per game.

==== Retirement thoughts ====
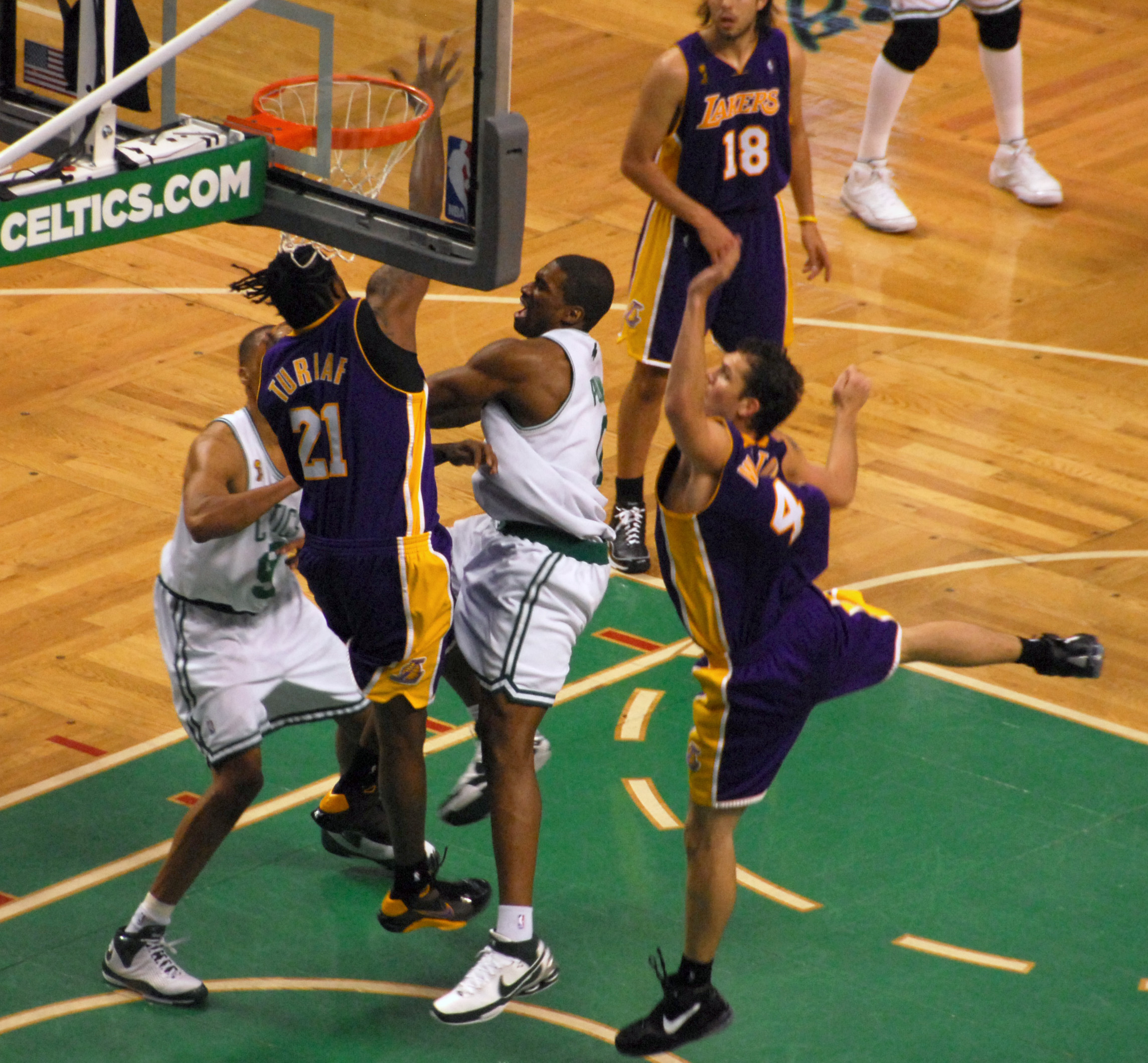
Brown (left) standing under the basket in Game 2 of the 2008 NBA Finals with the Boston Celtics

After the 2006–07 season, Brown did not re-sign with the Bulls and rejected offers from several teams interested in his services, citing he might have been done with his career. He went into semi-retirement while contemplating a possible return, lasting considerably into the 2007–08 season.

=== Boston Celtics (2008) ===
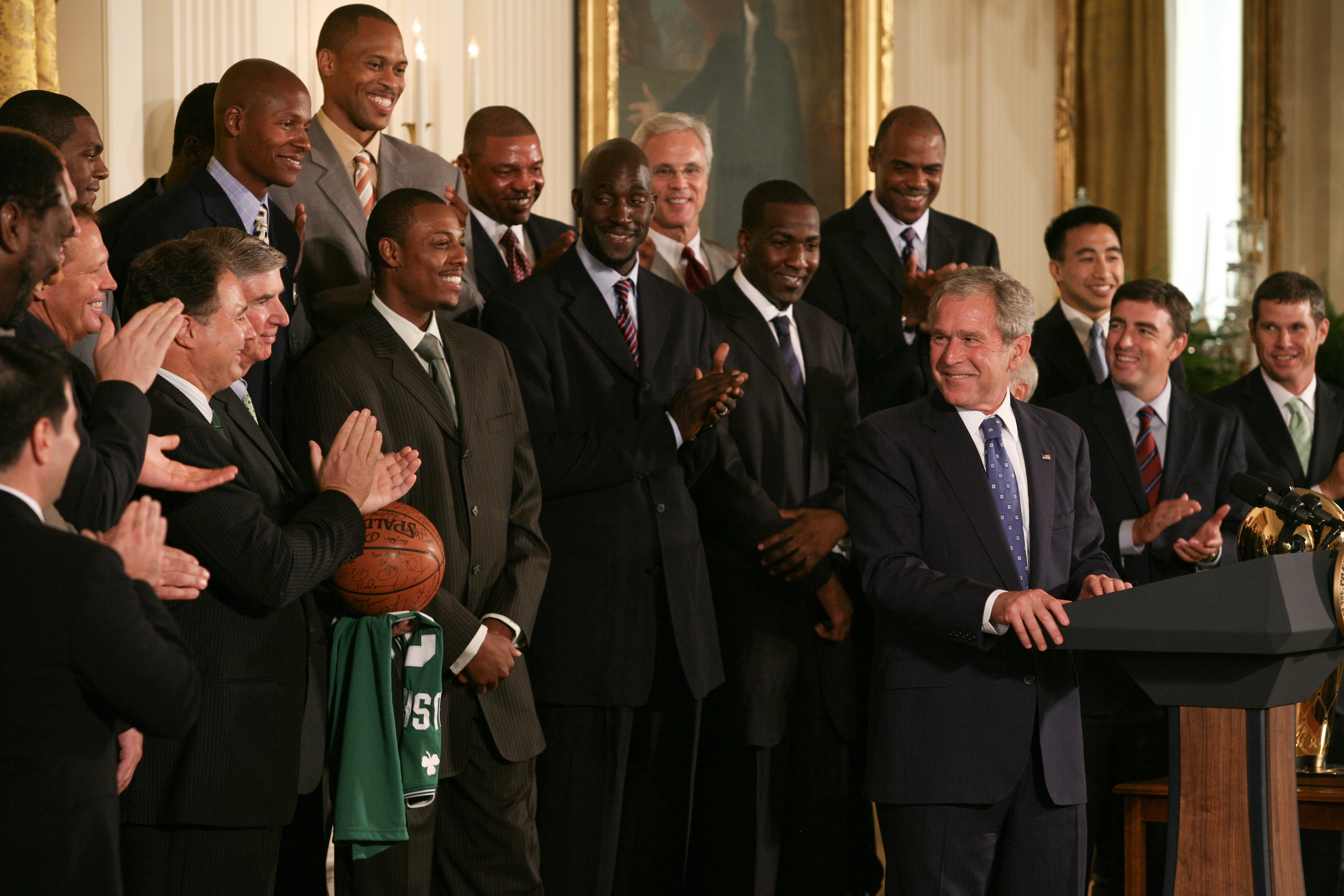
Brown and the 2008 NBA champion Boston Celtics with President George W. Bush at the White House

On February 27, 2008, after resting for most of the 2007–08 season and weighing his options, Brown signed with the Boston Celtics for the remainder of the season, in order to bolster their front court. His decision to come to Boston was strongly aided by a conversation with future teammates Ray Allen and Paul Pierce, who convinced him to sign with the Celtics during the 2008 NBA All-Star Weekend. The San Antonio Spurs and New Orleans Hornets were interested in his services, but he chose the Celtics instead. He made his debut against the Chicago Bulls, his former team, on March 7, 2008.

Brown had an unexpected breakout performance which took place in Game 7 of the Eastern Conference Semifinals against the Cleveland Cavaliers on May 18, 2008, when he scored 10 points and pulled down 6 rebounds, hitting all of his four shots and making key contributions in the fourth quarter. He hit a key shot with less than two minutes left in the game as the Celtics went on to win the game 97–92. After the game, he told reporters: "That shot, hey, probably I would say the biggest shot of my career". He also had a strong performance in Game 1 of the 2008 NBA Finals against the Los Angeles Lakers on June 5, 2008, playing increased minutes in the first Finals game of his 15-year career en route to a Celtics victory. He retired at the end of that season with a championship.

== NBA career statistics ==
Legend
GP	Games played	GS	Games started	MPG	Minutes per game
FG%	Field goal percentage	3P%	3-point field goal percentage	FT%	Free throw percentage
RPG	Rebounds per game	APG	Assists per game	SPG	Steals per game
BPG	Blocks per game	PPG	Points per game	**Bold**	Career high
†	Won an NBA championship	*	Led the league

=== Regular season ===
Year	Team	GP	GS	MPG	FG%	3P%	FT%	RPG	APG	SPG	BPG	PPG
1993–94	New Jersey	79	54	24.7	.415	.167	.757	6.2	1.2	.9	1.2	5.7
1994–95	New Jersey	80	63	30.8	.446	.167	.671	6.1	1.7	.9	**1.7**	8.1
1995–96	New Jersey	81	**81**	**36.3**	.444	**.200**	.770	6.9	2.0	1.0	1.2	11.3
1996–97	Miami	80	71	32.4	.457	.000	.732	8.4	1.2	**1.1**	1.2	9.5
1997–98	Miami	74	74	31.9	.471	—	.766	8.6	1.4	.9	1.3	9.6
1998–99	Miami	50*	50*	32.2	.480	—	.774	6.9	1.3	.9	1.0	**11.4**
1999–2000	Miami	80	80	28.8	.480	.000	.755	7.5	1.8	.8	.8	9.6
2000–01	Charlotte	80	79	35.1	.444	.000	.852	9.3	1.6	1.0	1.2	8.5
2001–02	Charlotte	80	80	32.0	.474	—	.858	**9.8**	1.3	.7	1.0	8.4
2002–03	New Orleans	78	78	33.4	**.531**	.000	.836	9.0	1.9	.9	1.0	10.7
2003–04	New Orleans	80	80	34.4	.476	.000	.854	8.6	1.9	1.0	.9	10.5
2004–05	New Orleans	**82**	78	34.4	.446	—	**.864**	9.0	**2.2**	.9	.6	10.8
2005–06	New Orleans/OKC	75	73	31.7	.461	—	.827	7.3	1.2	.6	.7	9.0
2006–07	Chicago	72	49	20.2	.407	.000	.787	4.8	.7	.3	.7	6.1
2007–08†	Boston	18	0	11.6	.341	.000	.688	3.8	.6	.3	.4	2.2
Career		1,089	990	31.1	.460	.136	.794	7.7	1.5	.8	1.0	9.1

=== Playoffs ===
Year	Team	GP	GS	MPG	FG%	3P%	FT%	RPG	APG	SPG	BPG	PPG
1994	New Jersey	4	1	14.0	.222	—	**1.000**	2.0	.8	.0	.5	3.0
1997	Miami	15	**15**	30.1	.408	—	.717	8.6	.7	.6	1.3	8.1
1998	Miami	5	5	38.0	**.514**	—	.364	8.8	.8	**1.4**	.6	9.2
1999	Miami	5	5	28.8	.467	.000	.900	6.2	1.0	.4	.4	**10.2**
2000	Miami	10	10	30.8	.427	—	.833	8.2	1.1	.8	.4	7.5
2001	Charlotte	10	10	**38.5**	.418	—	.828	**10.0**	1.1	1.2	1.4	8.0
2002	Charlotte	9	9	36.8	.427	—	.757	9.6	1.6	.7	1.3	**10.2**
2003	New Orleans	6	6	32.2	.477	—	.760	7.7	1.0	1.2	.5	**10.2**
2004	New Orleans	7	7	36.6	.366	—	.909	9.7	**2.1**	.4	**1.6**	8.9
2007	Chicago	10	10	22.8	.493	—	.739	4.7	1.2	.8	.2	8.3
2008†	Boston	**25**	0	13.6	.464	.000	.840	2.4	.5	.2	.4	2.9
Career		106	78	27.2	.434	.000	.751	6.6	1.0	.6	.8	7.1

== Personal life ==
Brown and his wife have four children. His daughter, Kalani Brown, is a professional basketball player with the Phoenix Mercury. Brown's nickname "P.J." was given to him by his grandmother as a child, due to his affinity for peanut butter and jelly sandwiches. He was inducted into the Louisiana Tech University Athletic Hall of Fame in 1998, the Louisiana Basketball Hall of Fame in 2001, and the Louisiana Sports Hall of Fame in 2016.

== See also ==
- Heat–Knicks rivalry
