= Pat Riley =

American basketball player, coach, and executive (born 1945)

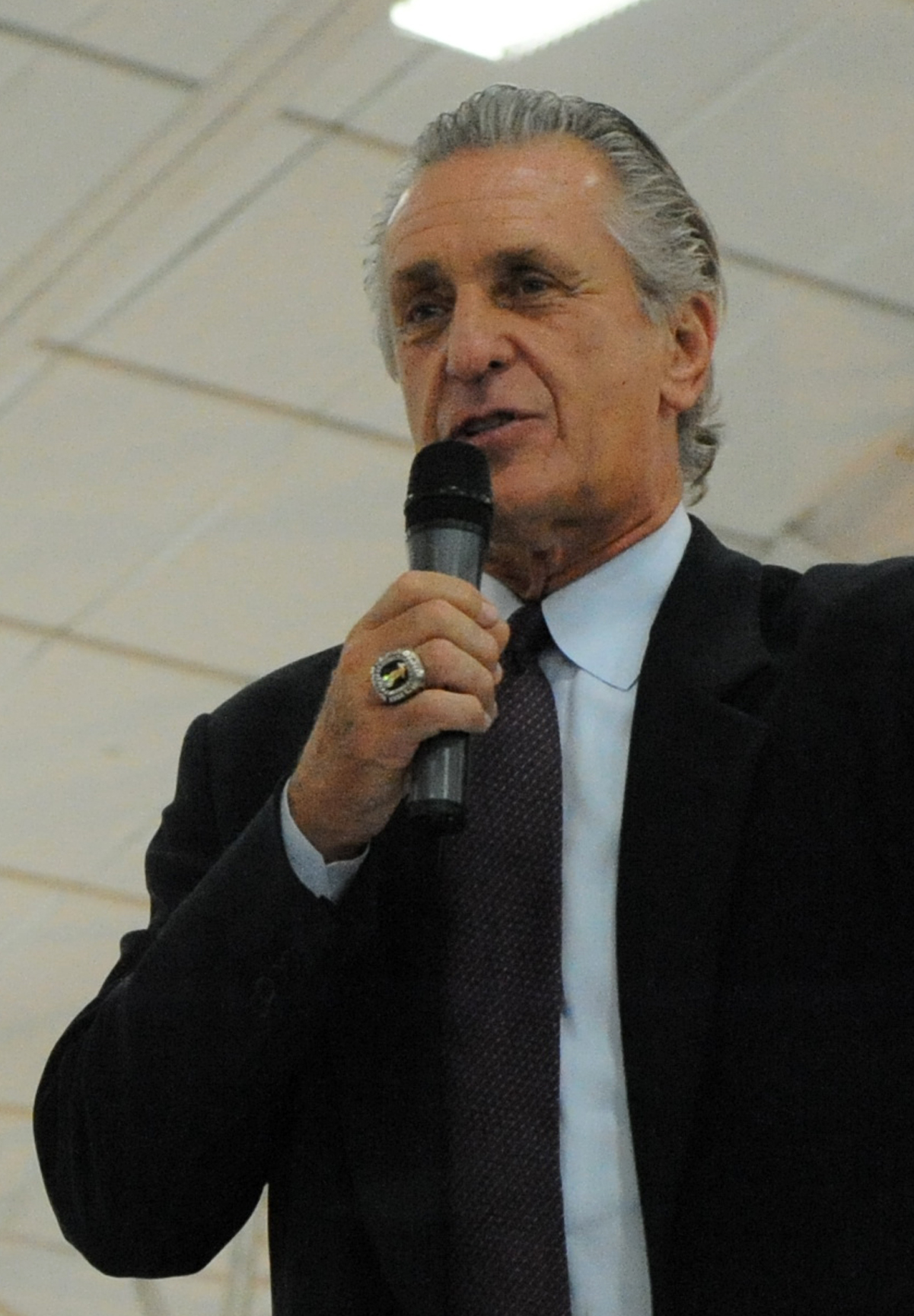
- Riley in 2010

Miami Heat
- Title: President
- League: NBA

Personal information
- Born: March 20, 1945 (age 81) Rome, New York, U.S.
- Listed height: 6 ft 4 in (1.93 m)
- Listed weight: 205 lb (93 kg)

Career information
- High school: Linton (Schenectady, New York)
- College: Kentucky (1964–1967)
- NBA draft: 1967: 1st round, 7th overall pick
- Drafted by: San Diego Rockets
- Playing career: 1967–1976
- Position: Shooting guard
- Number: 42, 12
- Coaching career: 1979–2008

Career history

Playing
- 1967–1970: San Diego Rockets
- 1970–1975: Los Angeles Lakers
- 1975–1976: Phoenix Suns

Coaching
- 1979–1981: Los Angeles Lakers (assistant)
- 1981–1990: Los Angeles Lakers
- 1991–1995: New York Knicks
- 1995–2003, 2005–2008: Miami Heat

Career highlights
- As player: NBA champion (1972); First-team All-American – USBWA (1966); Third-team All-American – AP, UPI (1966); SEC Player of the Year – AP (1966); No. 42 retired by Kentucky Wildcats; As head coach: 5× NBA champion (1982, 1985, 1987, 1988, 2006); 3× NBA Coach of the Year (1990, 1993, 1997); 9× NBA All-Star Game head coach (1982, 1983, 1985–1990, 1993); Top 10 Coaches in NBA History; Top 15 Coaches in NBA History; Chuck Daly Lifetime Achievement Award (2012); As assistant coach: NBA champion (1980); As executive: 2× NBA champion (2012, 2013); NBA Executive of the Year (2011)

Career NBA playing statistics
- Points: 3,906 (7.4 ppg)
- Rebounds: 855 (1.6 rpg)
- Assists: 913 (1.7 apg)
- Stats at NBA.com
- Stats at Basketball Reference

Career coaching record
- NBA: 1,210–694 (.636)
- Record at Basketball Reference
- Basketball Hall of Fame

Patrick James Riley (born March 20, 1945) is an American professional basketball executive, former coach, and former player in the National Basketball Association (NBA). He has been the team president of the Miami Heat since 1995, and he also served as the team's head coach from 1995 to 2003 and again from 2005 to 2008.

Often referred to as "the Godfather", Riley is regarded as one of the greatest NBA figures of all time both as a coach and executive. He has won five NBA championships as a head coach, four with the Los Angeles Lakers during their Showtime era in the 1980s and one with the Heat in 2006. Riley is a nine-time NBA champion across his tenures as a player (1972), assistant coach (1980), head coach (1982, 1985, 1987, 1988, 2006), and executive (2012, 2013). He is the first American sports figure to win a championship as a player, as an assistant coach, as a head coach, and as an executive. Since the start of his NBA career through 2023, Riley has reached 19 NBA finals across six different decades, making 25 percent of all NBA Finals as a player, coach, or executive.

Riley was named NBA Coach of the Year three times (1989–90, 1992–93 and 1996–97, as head coach of the Lakers, New York Knicks and Heat, respectively). He was head coach of an NBA All-Star Game team nine times: eight times with the Western Conference team (1982, 1983, 1985–1990, all as head coach of the Lakers) and once with the Eastern team (1993, as head coach of the Knicks). In 1996, he was named one of the 10 Greatest Coaches in NBA history. In 2008, Riley was inducted in the Naismith Memorial Basketball Hall of Fame as a coach. He received the Chuck Daly Lifetime Achievement Award from the NBA Coaches Association on June 20, 2012.

== Early life ==
Riley was born in Rome, New York and raised in Schenectady. He is the son of Mary Rosalia (Balloga) and Leon Riley, who played 22 seasons of minor league baseball as an outfielder and first baseman, and appeared in four games for the 1944 Philadelphia Phillies.

Riley played basketball for Linton High School in Schenectady under head coach Walt Przybylo and assistants Bill Rapavy and Ed Catino. Linton High School's 74–68 victory over New York City's Power Memorial on December 29, 1961, is remembered mostly for its two stars: Power Memorial's Lew Alcindor (who later changed his name to Kareem Abdul-Jabbar) and Riley, who would go on to coach Abdul-Jabbar with the Los Angeles Lakers. In 1991, Riley called it "one of the greatest games in the history of Schenectady basketball."

== College career ==
Riley played college basketball for four seasons for the Kentucky Wildcats—one on the freshman team and three on the varsity. As a junior on the 1965–66 Kentucky Wildcats men's basketball team, he was named First Team All-SEC, All-NCAA Tournament Team, NCAA Regional Player of the Year, SEC Player of the Year and AP Third Team All-American, leading the Wildcats to the 1966 NCAA title game. Coached by Adolph Rupp, UK lost to Texas Western (today's UTEP), a game that was reenacted in the movie Glory Road. In his senior year, Riley made First Team All-SEC, becoming one of the few players in Kentucky basketball history to be named First Team All-SEC twice.

== Professional career ==
=== San Diego Rockets (1967–1970) ===
Riley was selected by the San Diego Rockets as the seventh overall pick of the 1967 NBA draft. Despite the fact that he had not played college football, Riley was also drafted as a wide receiver by the Dallas Cowboys in the 11th round of the 1967 NFL/AFL draft. After playing three seasons with the Rockets, he was selected by the Portland Trail Blazers in the 1970 NBA expansion draft.

=== Los Angeles Lakers (1970–1975) ===
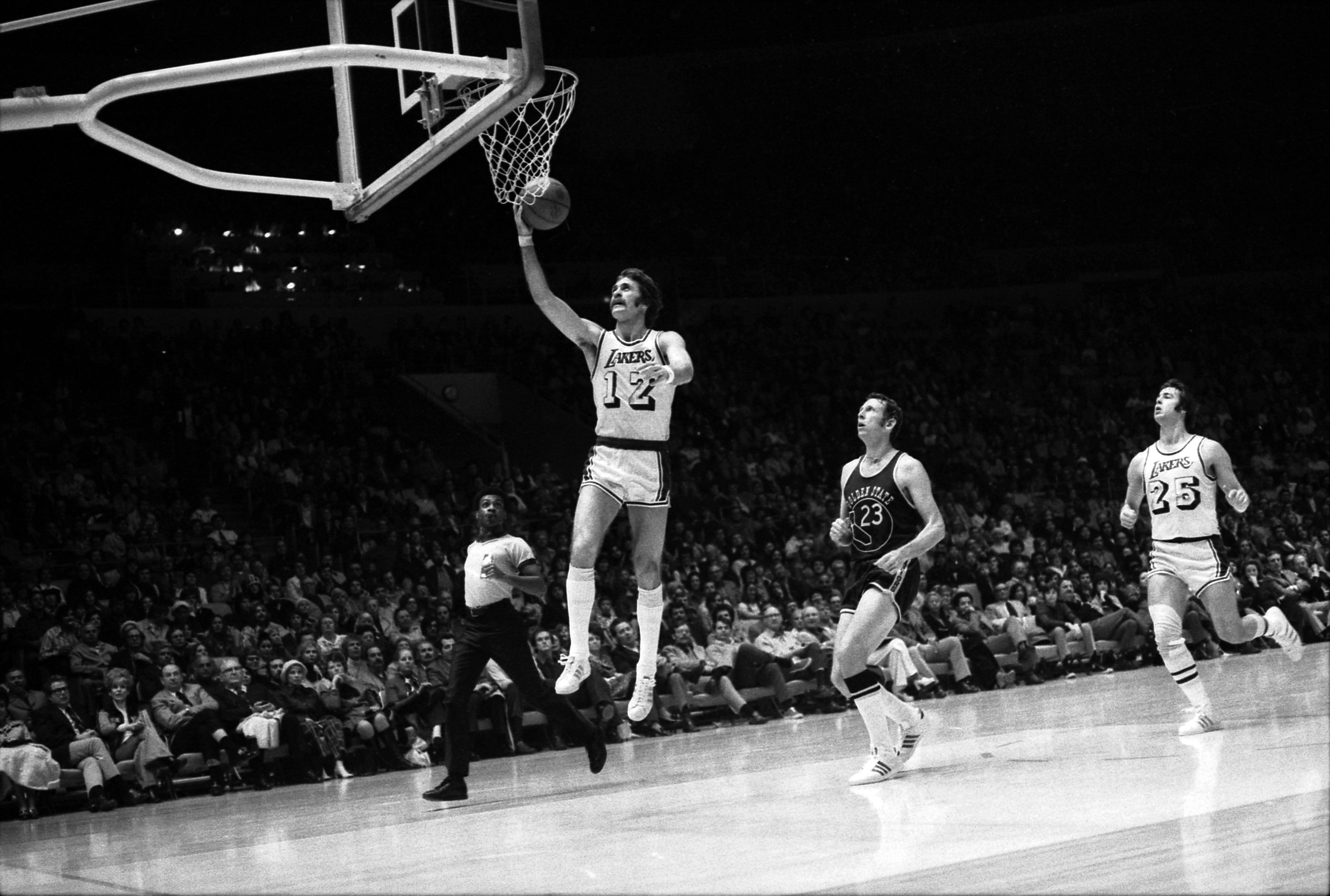
Riley as a Laker in 1974

The Blazers traded Riley to the Los Angeles Lakers, where he played for five seasons. Riley played a significant role as a reserve on the Lakers' 1972 NBA Championship team.

=== Phoenix Suns (1975–1976) ===
During the 1975–76 NBA season, Riley was traded to the Phoenix Suns. He retired in 1976, having averaged 7.4 points per game over his nine seasons in the league.

== Coaching and executive career (1979–present) ==
=== Los Angeles Lakers (1979–1990) ===
Riley returned to the NBA in 1977 as a broadcaster for the Lakers. In November 1979, after the team's head coach, Jack McKinney, was injured in a near-fatal bicycle accident, assistant coach Paul Westhead took over the team's head coaching duties and hired Riley as an assistant coach. With rookie guard Magic Johnson and longtime star Kareem Abdul-Jabbar, the Lakers defeated the Philadelphia 76ers in six games in the 1980 NBA Finals, giving Westhead and Riley championship rings in their first year coaching the team. However, the team lost in the playoffs the next year to the Moses Malone-led Houston Rockets.

Six games into the 1981–82 season, Magic Johnson said he wished to be traded because he was unhappy playing for Westhead. Shortly afterwards, Lakers' owner Jerry Buss fired Westhead. At an ensuing press conference, with Jerry West at his side, Buss named West head coach. West, however, balked, and Buss awkwardly tried to name West as "offensive captain" and then named West and Riley as co-coaches. West made it clear during the press conference that he would only assist Riley, and that Riley was the head coach. Thereafter, Riley was the interim head coach, until his status became permanent.

Riley ushered in the Lakers' "Showtime" era, along with superstar players Johnson and Abdul-Jabbar with their running game. Riley became a celebrity in his own right, a fashion icon for his Armani suits and slicked-back hair which complemented the team's Hollywood image.

Besides using Lakers' up-tempo style established by McKinney and Westhead, Riley was also innovative on defense; he was one of the first coaches to employ a 1-3-1 half-court trap to pick up the pace of the game. Though the Showtime Lakers were known for their offense, they won championships with their defense. In Michael Cooper, they had one of the top defensive guards in the game. The league-wide perception was that the Lakers played with finesse and were not physical enough to win in the playoffs. Riley's mantra was "no rebounds, no rings", reinforcing the need to fight for rebounds in order to win championships.

Riley led the Lakers to four consecutive NBA Finals appearances. His first title came in his first season, against the Philadelphia 76ers. Both teams returned to the Finals the next year, and this time Riley's Lakers, hobbled by injuries to Norm Nixon, Bob McAdoo and rookie James Worthy, were swept by the 76ers. The Lakers lost in the Finals again in 1984, to the Boston Celtics in seven games. The Lakers earned Riley his second NBA title in 1985 in a rematch of the previous year, as the Lakers beat the Celtics in six games. The Lakers' four-year Western Conference streak was broken the following year by the Houston Rockets.

In 1987, Riley coached a Lakers team that is considered one of the best teams of all time. With future Hall of Famers Magic Johnson, James Worthy and Kareem Abdul-Jabbar, plus Byron Scott, A.C. Green, Mychal Thompson, Kurt Rambis, and Cooper, the Lakers finished 65–17 in the regular season, third-best in team history. They met with similar success in the playoffs, dispatching the Celtics in six games to win Riley his third NBA title.

One of Riley's most famous moments came when he guaranteed the crowd a repeat championship during the Lakers' championship parade in downtown Los Angeles (he first made the guarantee during the post-victory locker room celebration). While the 1988 Lakers did not produce as many wins in the regular season as the 1987 Lakers, they still won the NBA title, becoming the first team in 19 years to repeat as champions. The Lakers beat the Detroit Pistons in seven games in the 1988 NBA Finals, making good on Riley's promise. Riley's titles with the Lakers make him one of six men to play for an NBA Championship team and later coach the same NBA team to a championship; the others are George Senesky, Bill Russell, Tom Heinsohn, K. C. Jones and Billy Cunningham.

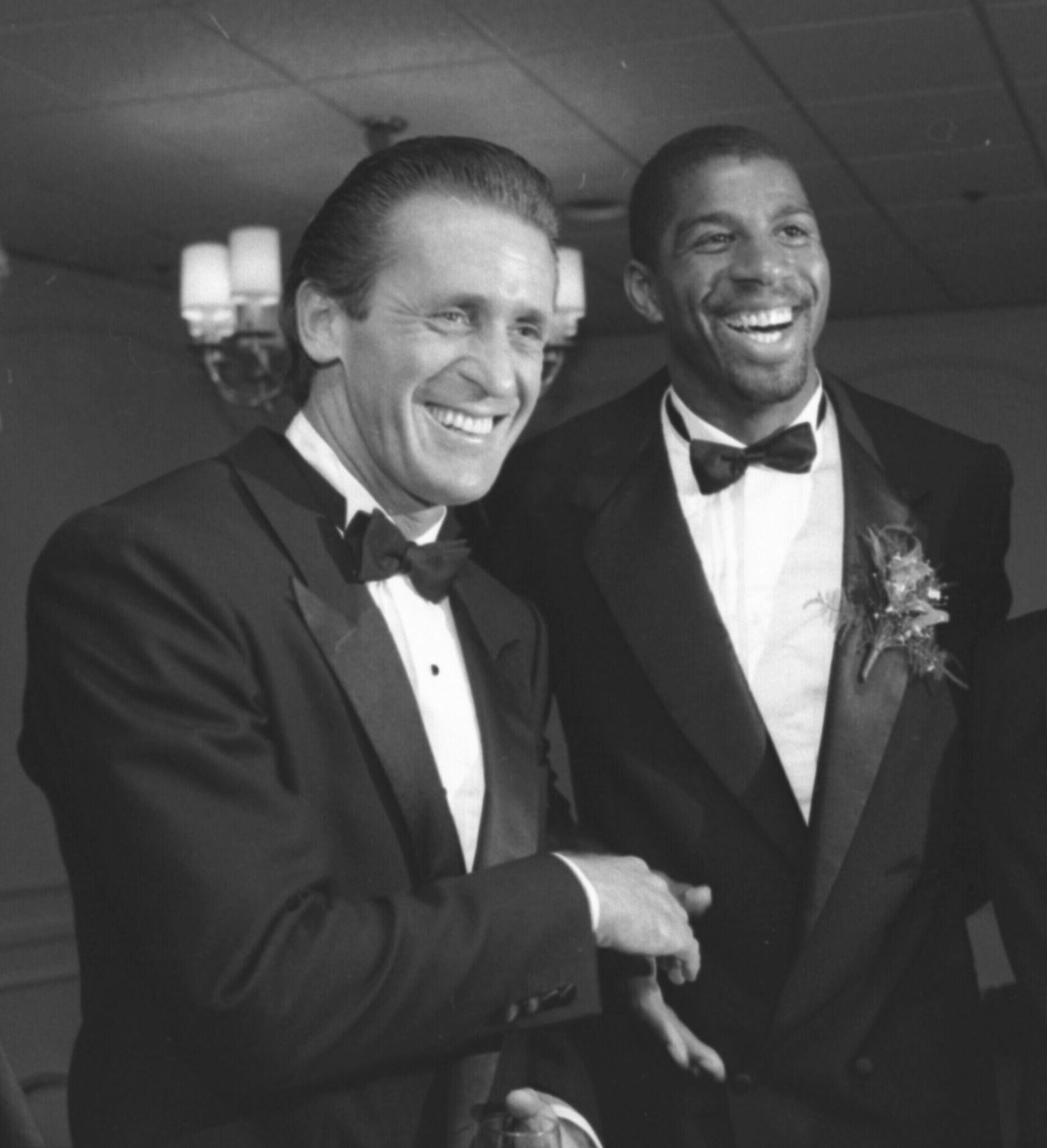
Riley (left) and Magic Johnson in 1989

Although Riley would offer no further guarantees, his Lakers embarked upon a quest to obtain a third consecutive championship in 1989. Having successfully claimed a repeat championship the year before, the term used for this new goal was a three-peat championship, and Riley, through his corporate entity, Riles & Co., trademarked the phrase three-peat. The Lakers won 57 games to lead the Western Conference, and swept the Western Conference bracket of the 1989 NBA playoffs (11–0).

In the days leading up to the 1989 NBA Finals, Riley took his team to a mini-training camp in Santa Barbara, California in hopes of keeping his players in peak physical form. However, his demanding, intense approach to practice took its toll on his players, and in one of the practices leading up to Game 1, Byron Scott injured his hamstring that kept him out for the series. Then during Game 2, Magic Johnson also pulled his hamstring, and though he tried to play in Game 3, the injury proved too severe for him to continue. Without Scott and later Johnson, the Lakers were swept by the Pistons in a Finals rematch.

Riley was named NBA Coach of the Year for the first time in 1989–90, but stepped down as Lakers head coach after they lost to the Phoenix Suns in the playoffs. At the time of his departure, Riley was the foremost coach in the NBA with a level of fame not seen since Red Auerbach.

=== New York Knicks (1991–1995) ===
After stepping down, Riley accepted a job as a television commentator for NBC for one year before being named head coach of the New York Knicks, starting with the 1991–92 season.

Commentators admired Riley's ability to work with the physical, deliberate Knicks, adapting his "Showtime" style with the fast-paced Laker teams in the 1980s. The Chicago Bulls had easily swept the Knicks in 1991 en route to their first championship. However, in 1992, with Riley, the Knicks pushed the defending champion Bulls to seven games in the Eastern Conference semifinals. The physical defense of the Knicks against the Chicago Bulls' superstars Michael Jordan and Scottie Pippen during the 1992 playoffs led to a feud between Riley and Bulls head coach Phil Jackson regarding the officiating and the Knicks' rough style of play. In 1993, Riley led the Knicks to their best regular season record in team history (tied with the 1969–1970 team) and received his second Coach of the Year award. The Knicks again met the Bulls in the Eastern Conference finals but lost in six games after winning the first two games at home. Jackson's Bulls that season went on to win the finals and accomplish a "three-peat," despite Riley's trademark in 1989.

Riley returned to the NBA Finals, in 1994, en route to defeating the three-time defending champion Bulls (without Michael Jordan) in seven games during the Eastern Conference semifinals. However, New York lost in seven games to the Houston Rockets after being up 3–2 in the series. During the 1994 Finals, Riley became the first coach to participate in an NBA Finals Game 7 with two teams, having been with the Lakers in 1984 and 1988. However, he had the unfortunate distinction of becoming the first (and to date, only) coach to lose an NBA Finals Game 7 with two teams, having lost to the Celtics, in 1984. It also denied him the distinction of becoming the first coach to win a Game 7 in the Finals with two teams, having defeated the Pistons in seven games, in 1988.

=== Miami Heat ===
==== Head coach and president (1995–2008) ====
On June 15, 1995, Riley resigned from the Knicks via fax to become president and head coach of the Miami Heat, with complete control over basketball operations. The move caused some controversy, as the Heat were accused by the Knicks of tampering by pursuing Riley while he still had a year remaining on his contract with the Knicks. The matter was settled after the Heat sent their 1996 first-round pick (which the Knicks used to draft Walter McCarty) and $1 million in cash to the Knicks on September 1, 1995.

In the 1995–96 NBA season, Riley led the Heat to a 42–40 record, which was a 10-game improvement over the team's previous season. Miami was swept in the first round of the playoffs by the Phil Jackson-coached Chicago Bulls, who went on to win the NBA championship. This Heat season was notable for personnel changes, as the team welcomed franchise building blocks Alonzo Mourning and Tim Hardaway. Following the season, the Heat also obtained Nets forward P.J. Brown and Suns swingman Dan Majerle.

In 1997, Riley's Heat defeated his old team, the Knicks, in a physical seven-game series. Advancing to the Eastern Conference finals for the first time in franchise history, the Heat were again defeated by the eventual champion Bulls. Riley was selected as Coach of the Year for the third time after leading Miami to a 61–21 regular season record and first place in the Atlantic Division.

Riley (right) with Miami Mayor Joe Carollo in March 1999

The Heat lost to the archrival Knicks in 1998, 1999, and 2000 in the playoffs. Riley then traded Brown and Jamal Mashburn in exchange for Eddie Jones in one trade and acquired Brian Grant in another, although the team suffered a major setback after Alonzo Mourning was lost for the season due to a kidney ailment. After finishing 50–32 in the 2000–01 season, the Heat were swept by the Charlotte Hornets in the first round of the NBA playoffs. The Heat then lost two of their best players when guard Tim Hardaway was traded to the Dallas Mavericks and Anthony Mason signed with the Milwaukee Bucks. In part because of these departures, the Heat crumbled to a 36–46 in 2002–the first time that a Riley-coached team had not had a winning season or made the playoffs.

After the Heat finished the 2002–03 season 25–57, Riley stepped down as head coach and was succeeded by longtime assistant Stan Van Gundy. In the 2003 NBA draft, the Heat held the fifth overall pick, which they used to select Dwyane Wade. In July 2004, Riley traded Caron Butler, Brian Grant, Lamar Odom, and a first-round draft pick to the Lakers for star center Shaquille O'Neal. Wade and O'Neal led the Heat to the Eastern Conference finals during the 2005 playoffs, where they lost to the defending champions Detroit Pistons after leading the series 3–2.

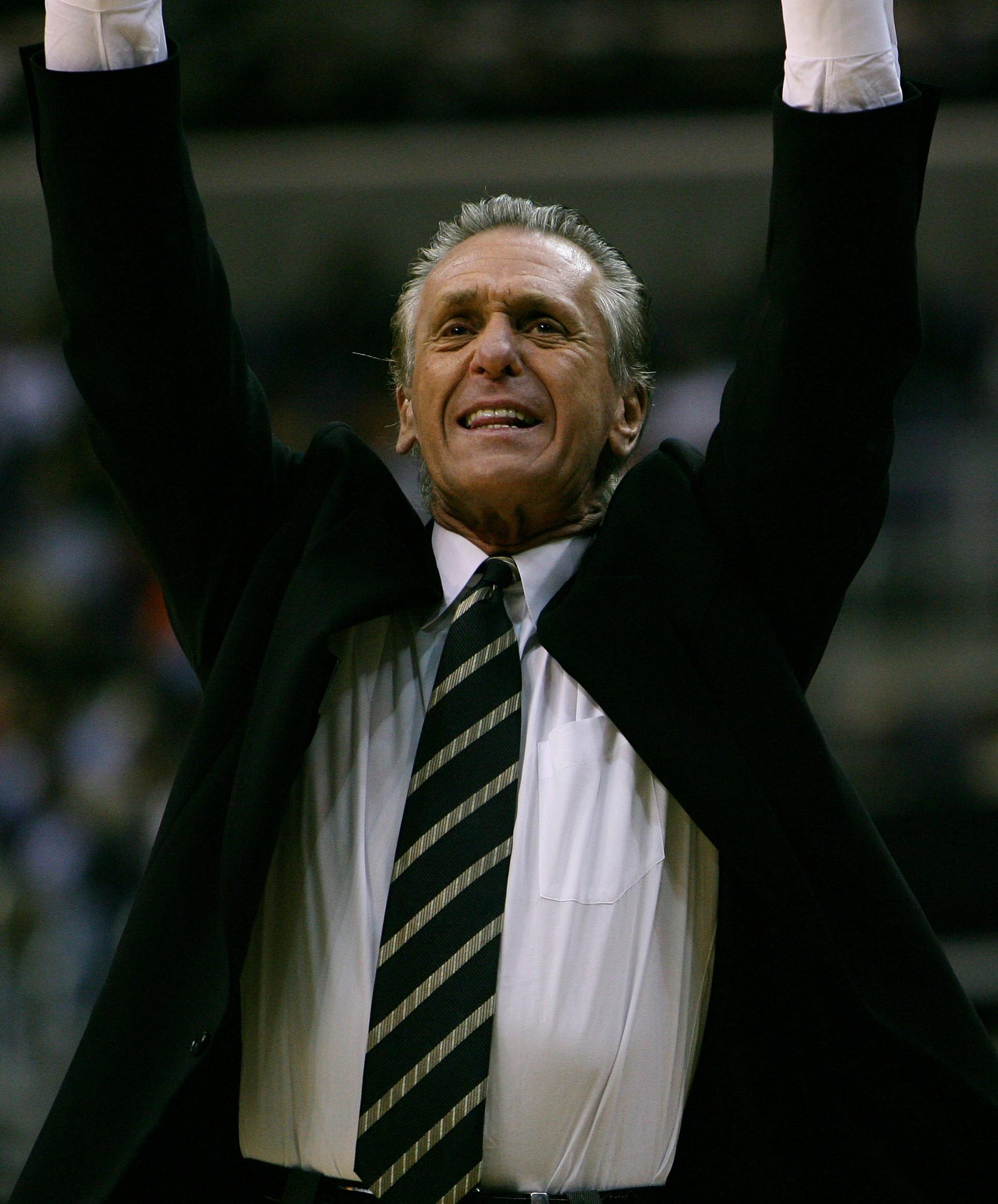
Riley in 2007 during his second stint as the Heat's coach

During the 2005 off-season, it was widely speculated that Riley was attempting to push Van Gundy out and make himself head coach once again now that the team was a championship contender. Van Gundy resigned from his position just 21 games into the 2005–06 season, citing a need to spend more time with his family, and Riley named himself as Van Gundy's successor. Riley's Heat team defeated the Detroit Pistons in the 2006 Eastern Conference finals on June 2, 2006, the first time Miami reached the finals. Riley's Heat squared off against the Dallas Mavericks in the 2006 NBA Finals. Despite losing the first two games, the Heat rallied to win the next four and their first NBA championship. After Game 6, Riley commented that he had packed one suit, one shirt, and one tie for the trip to Dallas. It was Riley's fifth championship as a head coach and his first with a team other than the Lakers.

Citing hip and knee problems, Riley took a leave of absence from coaching from January 3, 2007, through February 19, 2007. Assistant coach Ron Rothstein assumed interim duties. The Heat finished the season 44–38 and were swept in the first round of the playoffs by the Chicago Bulls, the first defending champions swept in the first round since the Philadelphia Warriors in 1957. The following season, the Heat finished 15–67. The team had lost several of its players to extended injuries, and a disgruntled Shaquille O'Neal was traded mid-season. Two years after winning the championship, they finished with one of the worst seasons in NBA history. It also tied the Heat's inaugural season of 1988–89 as the worst in franchise history, and was easily the worst full-season record compiled by a Riley-coached team.

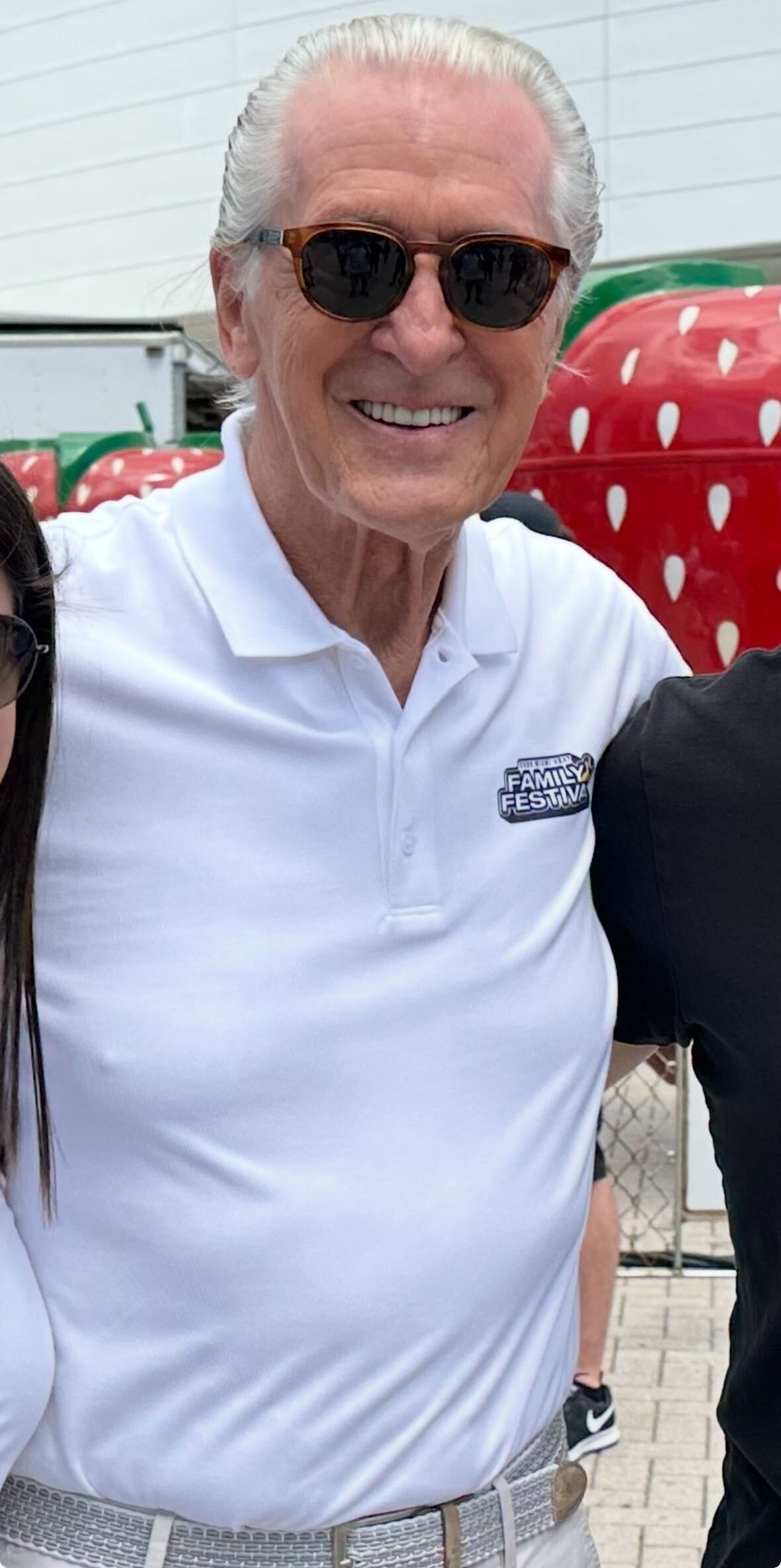
Riley at the Miami Heat Family Festival in March 2023

==== Full-time team president (2008–present) ====
On April 28, 2008, Riley announced that he would step down as head coach while remaining team president. He named assistant Erik Spoelstra as head coach. Although the Heat have nominally had a general manager for most of Riley's tenure as team president (Randy Pfund until 2008, and Andy Elisburg since 2013), Riley has had the final say in basketball matters since his arrival in Miami.

In 2010, Riley acquired LeBron James and Chris Bosh to form the Heat's "Big Three" with Dwyane Wade. Riley was named NBA Executive of the Year for the 2010–11 season. The Heat reached the NBA Finals each of the next four seasons (2011 through 2014). Although the Heat lost in 2011 to the Dallas Mavericks, the Heat would beat the Oklahoma City Thunder in the 2012 Finals to give Riley his first championship purely as an executive. The Heat repeated as champions in 2013, defeating the San Antonio Spurs in seven games. They would go on to lose in 2014 to the Spurs in five games.

In the 2019–20 season, the Heat became the fourth team in NBA history to finish lower than fourth place in their conference in the regular season and make it to the NBA Finals. The 2019–20 Heat team has been considered by some to be Riley's "magnum opus", since the team's Finals run was not preceded by a dramatic rebuild or by the selection of a high draft pick. Before the season, Riley traded for Jimmy Butler, drafted Tyler Herro, and signed the undrafted Kendrick Nunn. Before the 2019–20 trade deadline, the Heat obtained Andre Iguodala and Jae Crowder. Facing Riley's former team, the Los Angeles Lakers, led by former Heat superstar LeBron James, the Heat were defeated in six games. In 2023, the Heat had a similarly unprecedented run to the finals as an 8th-seeded team, becoming the second 8th seed to reach the finals. Ironically, the first were the Knicks, who defeated Riley's 1st-seeded Heat in the 1999 playoffs. However, the Heat lost to the Denver Nuggets in five games in the Finals.

Prior to the 2024–25 season, the Heat honored Riley by dedicating the Kaseya Center floor as the "Pat Riley Court at Kaseya Center". On February 5, 2025, Riley traded Butler to the Golden State Warriors in a five-team deal that gave the Heat Kyle Anderson, Davion Mitchell, Andrew Wiggins, and a 2025 protected first-round pick from the Warriors. During the following 2025–26 season on February 22, 2026, the Lakers also honored Riley by unveiling an 8–foot–tall, 510–pound bronze statue of him outside of Crypto.com Arena in Star Plaza sitting right between the statues of Lakers legends Kareem Abdul-Jabbar and Magic Johnson, making him the first non-player in Lakers history to be immortalized with a dedicated statue and honoring him and his accomplishments as both a player and a coach for the Lakers franchise. Sculpted by Omri Amrany and Sean Bell, the statue portrays Riley in his iconic Giorgio Armani suit with his right fist raised in the air—the signal he used during the 1980s Showtime era, replicating the famous on-court signal Riley used to instruct Johnson to feed Abdul-Jabbar for his signature skyhook, hence the placement of where the statue was immortalized.

== Outside basketball ==
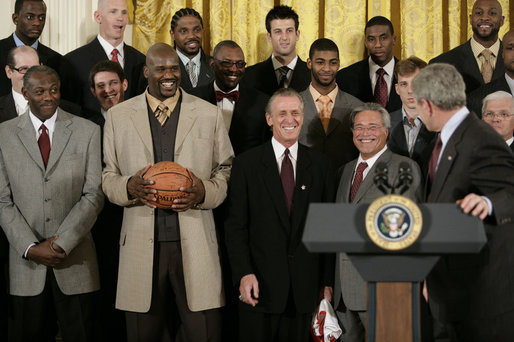
Riley and the Miami Heat with President George W. Bush, February 2007

Outside basketball, Riley has developed into a pop culture figure, born out of Riley's signature look; a slicked-back hairstyle, often described as gangster or mafioso-like, and his immaculate tan. Riley's nickname is "The Godfather" due to his similar appearance to Vito Corleone, a character in the 1972 film The Godfather.

In 1988, Riley published a book entitled Showtime: Inside the Lakers' Breakthrough Season, a New York Times best-seller which recapped the Lakers' successful run to the 1987 NBA Championship. One of the phrases Riley coined in the book was the "Disease of More", stating that "success is often the first step toward disaster" and that defending champions often fail the following season because every player who returns wants more playing time, more shots per game, and more money. The phrase stemmed from the Lakers' disappointing 1980–81 campaign coming off a championship the previous season.

In 1993, while coaching the New York Knicks, Riley published a second New York Times bestseller entitled The Winner Within: A Life Plan for Team Players. Aimed at business leadership as well as basketball enthusiasts, it distilled a lesson in teamwork and leadership from each of Riley's seasons as a coach to that date. Byron Laursen co-authored both of Riley's books.

Riley is known for his friendship with Giorgio Armani, preferring to wear Armani suits during basketball games and modeling once at an Armani show.

Riley has been married to the former Christine Rodstrom since June 26, 1970. In 1985, the Rileys adopted a son, James Patrick. In 1989, they adopted a daughter, Elisabeth. Riley is a practicing Roman Catholic.

On February 27, 2007, the Miami Heat were honored for their 2005–06 NBA Championship at the White House. During the ceremony, Riley presented George W. Bush with a jersey before announcing, "I voted for the man. If you don't vote, you don't count." After the ceremony, Riley was questioned by reporters about the political nature of his comments. He responded by saying, "I'm pro-American, pro-democracy, I'm pro-government. I follow my boss. He's my boss."

== Career statistics ==
Legend
GP	Games played	GS	Games started	MPG	Minutes per game
FG%	Field goal percentage	3P%	3-point field goal percentage	FT%	Free throw percentage
RPG	Rebounds per game	APG	Assists per game	SPG	Steals per game
BPG	Blocks per game	PPG	Points per game	**Bold**	Career high
†	Won an NBA championship

=== NBA ===
==== Regular season ====
NBA regular season statistics
Year	Team	GP	GS	MPG	FG%	3P%	FT%	RPG	APG	SPG	BPG	PPG
1967–68	San Diego	**80**	—	15.8	.379	—	.634	**2.2**	1.7	—	—	7.9
1968–69	San Diego	56	—	18.3	.406	—	.672	2.0	2.4	—	—	8.8
1969–70	San Diego	36	—	13.2	.417	—	.727	1.6	2.4	—	—	5.3
1970–71	L.A. Lakers	54	—	9.4	.413	—	.644	1.0	1.3	—	—	4.9
1971–72†	L.A. Lakers	67	—	13.8	**.447**	—	.743	1.9	1.1	—	—	6.7
1972–73	L.A. Lakers	55	—	14.6	.428	—	**.793**	1.2	1.5	—	—	7.3
1973–74	L.A. Lakers	72	—	18.9	.430	—	.764	1.8	2.1	**.8**	.0	9.5
1974–75	L.A. Lakers	46	—	**22.1**	.419	—	.742	1.8	**2.6**	**.8**	.1	**11.0**
1975–76	L.A. Lakers	2	—	11.5	.385	—	.333	1.5	.0	.5	**.5**	5.5
1975–76	Phoenix	60	—	13.2	.389	—	.730	.8	1.0	.4	.1	4.6
Career		528	—	15.5	.414	—	.705	1.6	1.7	.6	.1	7.4

==== Playoffs ====
NBA playoffs statistics
Year	Team	GP	GS	MPG	FG%	3P%	FT%	RPG	APG	SPG	BPG	PPG
1969	San Diego	5	—	15.2	**.432**	—	.833	**2.2**	.4	—	—	7.4
1971	L.A. Lakers	7	—	19.3	.420	—	.727	2.1	**2.0**	—	—	**9.4**
1972†	L.A. Lakers	**15**	—	16.3	.333	—	.750	1.9	.9	—	—	5.2
1973	L.A. Lakers	7	—	7.6	.333	—	—	.7	1.0	—	—	2.6
1974	L.A. Lakers	5	—	**21.2**	.360	—	.750	1.2	**2.0**	**.8**	.0	7.8
1976	Phoenix	5	—	5.4	.400	—	**1.000**	.0	1.0	.0	.0	2.6
Career		44	—	14.6	.374	—	.763	1.5	1.2	.4	.0	5.7

=== College ===
College statistics
Year	Team	GP	GS	MPG	FG%	3P%	FT%	RPG	APG	SPG	BPG	PPG
1964–65	Kentucky	25	—	33.0	.432	—	.618	8.5	1.1	—	—	15.0
1965–66	Kentucky	29	—	37.2	.516	—	.699	8.9	2.2	—	—	22.0
1966–67	Kentucky	26	—	36.7	.442	—	.782	7.7	2.6	—	—	17.4
Career		80	—	35.7	.469	—	.714	8.4	2.0	—	—	18.3

== Head coaching record ==
Legend
Regular season	G	Games coached	W	Games won	L	Games lost	W–L %	Win–loss %
Playoffs	PG	Playoff games	PW	Playoff wins	PL	Playoff losses	PW–L %	Playoff win–loss %

Coaching statistics
Team	Year	G	W	L	W–L%	Finish	PG	PW	PL	PW–L%	Result
L.A. Lakers	1981–82	71	50	21	.704	1st in Pacific	14	12	2	.857	Won NBA Championship
L.A. Lakers	1982–83	82	58	24	.707	1st in Pacific	15	8	7	.533	Lost in NBA Finals
L.A. Lakers	1983–84	82	54	28	.659	1st in Pacific	21	14	7	.667	Lost in NBA Finals
L.A. Lakers	1984–85	82	62	20	.756	1st in Pacific	19	15	4	.789	Won NBA Championship
L.A. Lakers	1985–86	82	62	20	.756	1st in Pacific	14	8	6	.571	Lost in Conference finals
L.A. Lakers	1986–87	82	65	17	.793	1st in Pacific	18	15	3	.833	Won NBA Championship
L.A. Lakers	1987–88	82	62	20	.756	1st in Pacific	25	15	9	.625	Won NBA Championship
L.A. Lakers	1988–89	82	57	25	.695	1st in Pacific	15	11	4	.733	Lost in NBA Finals
L.A. Lakers	1989–90	82	63	19	.768	1st in Pacific	9	4	5	.444	Lost in Conference semifinals
New York	1991–92	82	51	31	.622	1st in Atlantic	12	6	6	.500	Lost in Conference semifinals
New York	1992–93	82	60	22	.732	1st in Atlantic	15	9	6	.600	Lost in Conference finals
New York	1993–94	82	57	25	.695	1st in Atlantic	25	14	11	.560	Lost in NBA Finals
New York	1994–95	82	55	27	.671	2nd in Atlantic	11	6	5	.545	Lost in Conference semifinals
Miami	1995–96	82	42	40	.512	3rd in Atlantic	3	0	3	.000	Lost in First round
Miami	1996–97	82	61	21	.744	1st in Atlantic	17	8	9	.471	Lost in Conference finals
Miami	1997–98	82	55	27	.671	1st in Atlantic	5	2	3	.400	Lost in First round
Miami	1998–99	50	33	17	.660	1st in Atlantic	5	2	3	.400	Lost in First round
Miami	1999–00	82	52	30	.634	1st in Atlantic	10	6	4	.600	Lost in Conference semifinals
Miami	2000–01	82	50	32	.610	2nd in Atlantic	3	0	3	.000	Lost in First round
Miami	2001–02	82	36	46	.439	6th in Atlantic	—	—	—	—	Missed playoffs
Miami	2002–03	82	25	57	.305	7th in Atlantic	—	—	—	—	Missed playoffs
Miami	2005–06	61	41	20	.672	1st in Southeast	23	16	7	.696	Won NBA Championship
Miami	2006–07	82	44	38	.537	1st in Southeast	4	0	4	.000	Lost in First round
Miami	2007–08	82	15	67	.183	5th in Southeast	—	—	—	—	Missed playoffs
Career		1,904	1,210	694	.636		282	171	111	.606	

== Awards and honors ==
NBA

- Nine-time NBA Champion (one as a player, one as an assistant coach, five as a head coach, and two as an executive)
- Three-time NBA Coach of the Year
- Nine-time NBA All-Star Game head coach
- 2011 NBA Executive of the Year
- 2012 Chuck Daly Lifetime Achievement Award

NCAA

- 1966 First Team All-American
- Number 42 retired by the Kentucky Wildcats

Halls of Fame

- Naismith Memorial Basketball Hall of Fame (class of 2008)

== See also ==
- Pat Riley Basketball, a 1990 video game
- List of NBA championship head coaches

== Bibliography ==
- Heisler, Mark (1994). The Lives of Riley, Macmillan General Reference, ISBN 0-02-550662-5
