= Jamal Mashburn =

American basketball player (born 1972)

Personal information
- Born: November 29, 1972 (age 53) The Bronx, New York, U.S.
- Listed height: 6 ft 8 in (2.03 m)
- Listed weight: 247 lb (112 kg)

Career information
- High school: Cardinal Hayes (The Bronx, New York)
- College: Kentucky (1990–1993)
- NBA draft: 1993: 1st round, 4th overall pick
- Drafted by: Dallas Mavericks
- Playing career: 1993–2005
- Position: Small forward
- Number: 32, 24

Career history
- 1993–1997: Dallas Mavericks
- 1997–2000: Miami Heat
- 2000–2002: Charlotte Hornets
- 2002–2005: New Orleans Hornets

Career highlights
- NBA All-Star (2003); All-NBA Third Team (2003); NBA All-Rookie First Team (1994); Consensus first-team All-American (1993); SEC Player of the Year (1993); SEC Athlete of the Year (1993); 2× First-team All-SEC (1992, 1993); Second-team Parade All-American (1990); Mr. New York Basketball (1990)

Career NBA statistics
- Points: 11,644 (19.1 ppg)
- Rebounds: 3,271 (5.4 rpg)
- Assists: 2,414 (4.0 apg)
- Stats at NBA.com
- Stats at Basketball Reference

Jamal Mashburn Sr. (born November 29, 1972) is an American entrepreneur and former professional basketball player. Nicknamed "the Monster Mash", Mashburn was a prolific scorer as a small forward in his 12 seasons in the National Basketball Association (NBA), with a career scoring average of 19.1 points per game.

== Early life and college career ==
Mashburn was born to Bobby, a former heavyweight boxer and New York City police officer, and Helen Mashburn. His father retired in 1974 and then lived separately from Helen and his son Jamal, divorcing after about 10 years.

Mashburn learned the game at Rucker Park, just a block away from where he was raised at the Rangel Houses in Harlem.

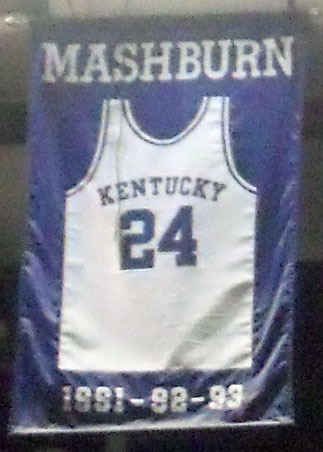
A jersey honoring Mashburn hangs in Rupp Arena

After attending Cardinal Hayes High School in The Bronx, Mashburn had a very successful basketball career in college, playing for the University of Kentucky. He was the fourth-leading career scorer for the Wildcats and a consensus First Team All-American by his junior year, in which the Wildcats made it to the Final Four of the NCAA Tournament. Following the tournament he declared for the 1993 NBA draft, with Mashburn being selected by the Dallas Mavericks with the fourth pick.

== Professional career ==
=== Dallas Mavericks (1993–1997) ===
After being drafted, Mashburn signed a seven-year, $32 million contract. Mashburn joined a Mavericks team that had won just 11 games the year prior, led by veteran point guard Derek Harper and second year guard Jim Jackson, and Mashburn quickly shared the reins of the offense, averaging 19.2 points a game in 73 starts and earning a selection to the first NBA All-Rookie Team. Despite this the Mavericks could only manage 13 wins for the 1993–94 season. In the off-season, the team drafted star point guard Jason Kidd, teaming up with Jackson and Mashburn to become known collectively as "The Three J's." The Mavericks would improve to 36 wins in the 1994–95 season, as Mashburn averaged 24.1 points a game (sixth in the league), while placing fifth in the league in free throw makes (447), seventh in made field goals (683), and fifth in total points (1,926). The season also featured a 50-point performance by Mashburn on November 12 against the Chicago Bulls in Chicago. This made him the fourth-youngest player to score 50 points in an NBA game (Brandon Jennings is the youngest). He also broke many franchise records and blossomed into one of the best scoring forwards in the league. Despite the team's improvement they were unable to make the playoffs, and injuries would force Mashburn to only play 18 games in the 1995–96 season.

Mashburn started in just 21 games of the Mavericks' first 37 games of the 1996–97 season, and on February 14, 1997, he was traded to the Miami Heat in exchange for Kurt Thomas, Predrag Danilović and Martin Müürsepp.

=== Miami Heat (1997–2000) ===
Miami was a loaded team led by all-stars Alonzo Mourning and Tim Hardaway and coached by Pat Riley. The addition of Mashburn boosted the team's offense, and the team finished the season with a franchise best 61 wins with Mashburn averaging 13.4 points in 30 starts. In the playoffs the Heat defeated the Orlando Magic in a difficult 5 games in the first round, followed by a grueling seven-game series win against the New York Knicks. Miami made its first ever Conference Finals against the defending champion Bulls, and would lose the first three games of the series before managing a win in Miami in game four, with Mashburn scoring 17 points. The Bulls proved too much for the Heat and won the series in the fifth game in Chicago. Mashburn averaged 10.5 points in his first postseason.

Injuries limited Mashburn to 48 games in the 1997–98 season, but he started in each game he played and averaged 15.1 points a game as Miami won 55 games before losing in a five-game first round series to the Knicks. Mashburn started in 3 of the games and saw his production slip. The following season would be shortened to 50 games due to a league lockout, and injuries again limited Mashburn to just 23 starts with averages of 14.8 points a game with 6.1 rebounds a game. Miami captured the best record in the Eastern Conference, but once again lost in the first round to New York, as Mashburn averaged 10 points in the five-game series.

The 1999–2000 season featured an improvement statistically for Mashburn, as he shouldered more of the offensive load and averaged 17.5 points a game including a career high 112 three point field goals. The Heat won 52 games before sweeping the Detroit Pistons in the first round of the playoffs in three games. This set up another rematch with New York, as the Heat and Knicks battled in another grueling seven-game series. Despite scoring in bunches in the Heat's victories, including a 21-point performance in game 5, Mashburn's scoring dropped off in the final two games of the series, and the Knicks once again eliminated Miami at home. Following another disappointing playoff run for the team, Mashburn and teammate P. J. Brown were traded to the Charlotte Hornets for Eddie Jones and Anthony Mason.

=== Charlotte Hornets (2000–2002) ===
In his first season in Charlotte, Mashburn signed a six-year, $54.3 million extension through the 2005–06 season. He averaged 20.1 points, 7.6 rebounds and 5.4 assists in 76 games. Led by his play and the play of Baron Davis, the Hornets won 46 games and faced Miami in the first round of the playoffs. While his former team was favored to win the series, Mashburn averaged 23.7 points, as the younger Hornets shocked the Heat and swept them in three games. Next up were the Milwaukee Bucks, who took a two-game lead before the Hornets won game three in Charlotte led by Mashburn's 36 points and game four, in which Mashburn scored 31. Despite managing to win three straight games, the Bucks responded to win the last two games and the series. Mashburn averaged a career high 24.9 points in the 2001 playoffs.

The 2001–02 season once again featured injury problems for Mashburn, and he only played in 40 games averaging 21.5 points per game. The Hornets made the playoffs and defeated Orlando before losing to the New Jersey Nets, but Mashburn's injury woes kept him out of the postseason. The Hornets would go on to relocate to New Orleans after the season ended.

=== New Orleans Hornets (2002–2005) ===
Mashburn's best overall NBA season took place in the 2002–03 season, and he played in all 82 games averaging 21.6 points per game. He played in his first and only All-Star game, scoring 10 points in the 2003 NBA All-Star Game in Atlanta, won the Eastern Conference Player of the Month award in March and made the All-NBA Third Team. The season also featured some high scoring games for Mashburn, including a 50-point performance against Memphis on February 21 and a 40-point game against Orlando on March 26. The Hornets won 47 games and faced the Philadelphia 76ers in the first round of the playoffs, but Mashburn played in only four games of the series due to a finger injury. In the deciding Game 6 loss on May 2, 2003, Mashburn led the Hornets in scoring with 36 points while adding five assists.

Mashburn continued his stellar play in the 2003–04 season, but injuries plagued him for most of the year and he managed to play in only 19 games. He was later unable to participate in the 2004 playoffs. Bothered by problems with his right knee (patella femoral irritation), he decided to sit out the 2004–05 season in hopes that his knee would recover. He had microfracture surgery performed on his knee, a risky surgery that not all players have been able to recover from.

=== Retirement ===
Despite his decision to sit out the year due to his knee, the Hornets still traded Mashburn, along with Rodney Rogers, to the Philadelphia 76ers in exchange for forward Glenn Robinson on February 24, 2005. Mashburn was never able to recover from his chronic knee problems and never saw court time for Philadelphia. He was on the injured list for all of the 2004–05 season and the inactive list for 2005–06. On March 24, 2006, the 76ers waived Mashburn, who subsequently announced his retirement from the NBA. He had career averages of 19.1 points, 5.4 rebounds and 4.0 assists per game.

Mashburn, who averaged 20.8 points per game in 2003–04, is one of only six players since 1970 to have averaged at least 20 points per game in his final NBA season. The other five are Jerry West (20.3 in 1973–74), Larry Bird (20.2 in 1991–92), Dražen Petrović (who died mid-career, 22.3 in 1992–93), Reggie Lewis (who died mid-career, 20.8 in 1992–93), and Michael Jordan (20.0 in 2002–03).

== Post-basketball career ==
Since retiring from basketball, Mashburn has worked for ESPN as an analyst and launched a number of successful business ventures. As of 2026, he owned over 90 businesses, including 38 Outback Steakhouse locations, 40 Papa John's locations, three Dunkin' Donuts locations, and a number of car dealerships across the state of Kentucky. Mashburn is a partner in Ol Memorial Stable, along with former Kentucky coach Rick Pitino and Outback Steakhouse co-founder Chris T. Sullivan, which owned 2024 Kentucky Derby prospect Buffalo Man. As early as 2012, Mashburn sought to join a group that planned to purchase the Charlotte Hornets, but his group was beaten out by Michael Jordan. He has since become part of the ownership group of French top-flight club Élan Béarnais.

== Personal life ==
Mashburn has lived in Miami since his retirement. In 2017, he and his wife divorced after a 17-year marriage. Their son, Jamal Jr., attended the Gulliver Prep before transferring to Brewster Academy. A 4-star recruit out of high school, Jamal Jr. played college basketball for Minnesota for a year, followed by 3 years at New Mexico. Jamal Jr. was coached by Richard Pitino at both Minnesota and New Mexico. Jamal Jr. was a graduate transfer to Temple University for his last year of eligibility in 2024–2025.

== NBA career statistics ==
Legend
GP	Games played	GS	Games started	MPG	Minutes per game
FG%	Field goal percentage	3P%	3-point field goal percentage	FT%	Free throw percentage
RPG	Rebounds per game	APG	Assists per game	SPG	Steals per game
BPG	Blocks per game	PPG	Points per game	**Bold**	Career high

=== Regular season ===
Year	Team	GP	GS	MPG	FG%	3P%	FT%	RPG	APG	SPG	BPG	PPG
1993–94	Dallas	79	73	36.7	.406	.284	.699	4.5	3.4	1.1	.2	19.2
1994–95	Dallas	80	80	37.3	.436	.328	.739	4.1	3.7	1.0	.1	**24.1**
1995–96	Dallas	18	18	37.2	.379	.343	.729	5.4	2.8	.8	.2	23.4
1996–97	Dallas	37	21	26.4	.372	.321	.649	3.1	2.5	.9	.1	10.6
1996–97	Miami	32	30	37.2	.398	.329	.752	5.6	3.5	**1.3**	.2	13.4
1997–98	Miami	48	48	36.0	.435	.303	.797	4.9	2.8	.9	**.3**	15.1
1998–99	Miami	24	23	35.6	**.451**	**.433**	.721	6.1	3.1	.8	.1	14.8
1999–00	Miami	76	76	37.2	.445	.403	.778	5.0	3.9	1.0	.2	17.5
2000–01	Charlotte	76	76	39.3	.413	.356	.766	**7.6**	5.4	1.1	.2	20.1
2001–02	Charlotte	40	40	40.0	.407	.366	**.876**	6.1	4.3	1.1	.2	21.5
2002–03	New Orleans	**82**	**81**	**40.5**	.422	.389	.848	6.1	**5.6**	1.0	.2	21.6
2003–04	New Orleans	19	18	38.4	.392	.284	.813	6.2	2.5	.7	**.3**	20.8
Career		611	584	37.3	.418	.345	.766	5.4	4.0	1.0	.2	19.1
All-Star		1	0	14.0	.571	1.000	.000	4.0	2.0	2.0	.0	10.0

=== Playoffs ===
Year	Team	GP	GS	MPG	FG%	3P%	FT%	RPG	APG	SPG	BPG	PPG
1997	Miami	**17**	**17**	32.6	.387	.355	.650	4.9	2.1	1.0	.1	10.5
1998	Miami	5	3	25.8	.267	.364	.750	4.4	1.8	.6	.2	6.2
1999	Miami	5	5	30.4	.388	**.429**	.667	2.6	2.0	.4	.0	10.0
2000	Miami	10	10	**42.3**	.401	.394	**.857**	4.6	3.2	1.1	.2	17.5
2001	Charlotte	10	10	41.9	.404	.333	.841	**6.2**	**5.7**	**1.2**	**.3**	**24.9**
2002	Charlotte	1	1	10.0	.000	.000	.000	1.0	1.0	.0	.0	.0
2003	New Orleans	4	4	40.5	**.430**	.400	.714	3.5	5.3	1.0	**.3**	24.8
Career		52	50	35.6	.389	.369	.780	4.7	3.2	.9	.2	15.0
