= 1988–89 Miami Heat season =

NBA basketball team season (inagaural season)

- Head coach: Ron Rothstein
- General manager: Lewis Schaffel
- Owners: Ted Arison; Billy Cunningham; Lewis Schaffel
- Arena: Miami Arena

Results
- Record: 15–67 (.183)
- Place: Division: 6th (Midwest); Conference: 13th (Western)
- Playoff finish: Did not qualify
- Stats at Basketball Reference

Local media
- Television: WBFS-TV; SportsChannel Florida (Sam Smith, Eric Reid)
- Radio: WQAM (Sam Smith, Eric Reid); WAQI (Spanish) (Sarvelio del Valle, Jose Paneda)

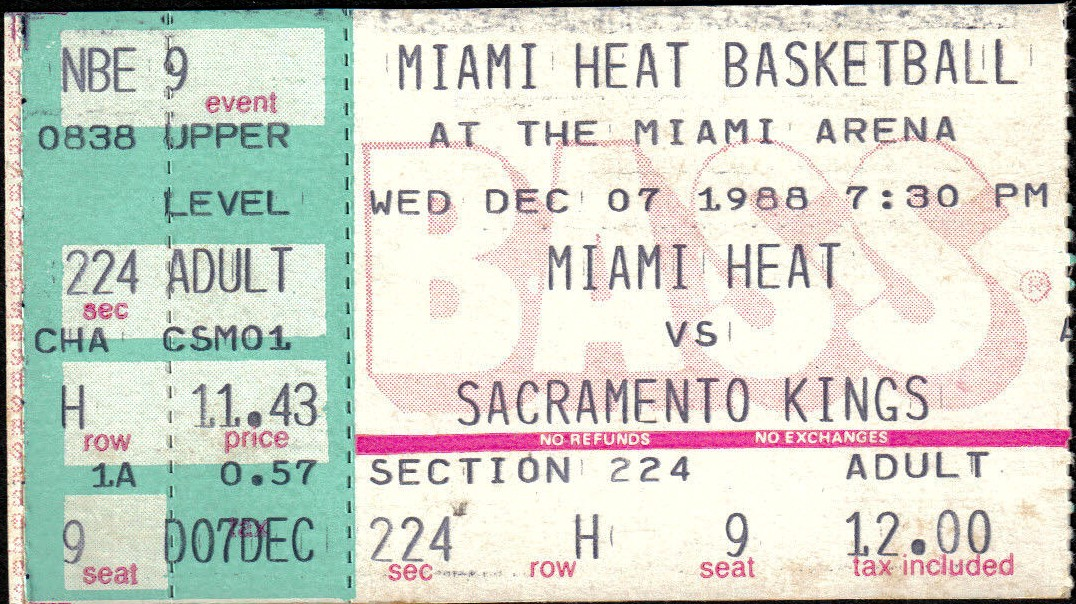
A ticket for a December 1988 game between the Heat and the Sacramento Kings.

The 1988–89 Miami Heat season was the inaugural season for the Miami Heat in the National Basketball Association. The Heat were the first of two expansion teams to play in the state of Florida over a two-year period, and along with the Charlotte Hornets, joined the NBA during the 1988–89 season.

== Season summary ==
=== Off-season ===
The Heat revealed their new primary logo, adding red, black, white, golden yellow and light red to their color scheme; the team's primary logo featured a flaming light red basketball with white seams and golden yellow on the top, going through a black hoop above the city and team name in black letters. The team also revealed new white home uniforms, and new black road uniforms with a red, white and light red trim; both uniforms featured red, white and light red trim side panels on the right side of their jerseys and shorts, while the team's primary logo was featured on the left leg of their shorts. The team's new primary logo, and new uniforms would both remain in use until 1999. The Heat played their home games at the Miami Arena in Miami, Florida.

In the 1988 NBA expansion draft, the Heat selected veteran players like Billy Thompson, Fred Roberts, Jon Sundvold, Darnell Valentine, Dwayne "Pearl" Washington and Scott Hastings. However, Roberts was traded to the Milwaukee Bucks, and Valentine was dealt to the Cleveland Cavaliers. The team also signed free agents Pat Cummings and Rory Sparrow during the off-season. The Heat received the ninth overall pick in the 1988 NBA draft, and selected center Rony Seikaly out of Syracuse University, and also selected shooting guard Kevin Edwards out of DePaul University with the 20th overall pick. Other rookies on the team included second-round draft picks, power forward Grant Long out of Eastern Michigan University, and small forward Sylvester Gray from the University of Memphis. The team hired Ron Rothstein as their first ever head coach.

=== Regular season ===
The Heat made their NBA regular season debut on November 5, 1988, in which the team lost to the Los Angeles Clippers by a score of 111–91 at the Miami Arena. Sparrow made the first basket in the team's franchise history, while Washington led the Heat with 16 points and 3 steals off the bench. The Heat struggled posting a dreadful 17-game losing streak to start their inaugural season, which was an NBA record for the worst start to the season at the time; the team had a winless month in November, losing all twelve of their games during that month. On December 14, the Heat won their first ever game of the season and in franchise history, defeating the Clippers on the road by a score of 89–88 at the Los Angeles Memorial Sports Arena; Long, Thompson and Cummings all led the team with 15 points each. Five games later on December 23, the Heat won their first ever home game at the Miami Arena, defeating the Utah Jazz by a score of 101–80; Sparrow led the team with 19 points, while Edwards finished with 18 points and 8 assists, and Cummings contributed 17 points.

The Heat struggled all season long, posting a 10-game losing streak between December and January, then posting a seven-game losing streak between January and February, and holding a dreadful 5–40 record at the All-Star break. The team posted a six-game losing streak between February and March, and posted another seven-game losing streak in April, losing 12 of their final 14 games of the season. The Heat finished their inaugural season in last place in the Midwest Division with a record of 15 wins and 67 losses, which was the league's worst record during the regular season.

Edwards led the Heat in scoring averaging a low team-high of 13.8 points, and contributed 4.4 assists and 1.8 steals per game, and was also named to the NBA All-Rookie Second Team, while Sparrow averaged 12.5 points, 5.4 assists and 1.3 steals per game, and Long provided the team with 11.9 points, 6.7 rebounds and 1.5 steals per game. In addition, Seikaly averaged 10.9 points and 7.0 rebounds per game, while Thompson provided with 10.8 points and 7.2 rebounds per game, and Sundvold contributed 10.4 points per game and shot .522 in three-point field-goal percentage. Meanwhile, Cummings averaged 8.8 points and 5.3 rebounds per game, Gray provided with 8.0 points and 5.2 rebounds per game, Washington contributed 7.6 points and 4.2 assists per game, and Hastings averaged 5.1 points and 3.1 rebounds per game.

During the NBA All-Star weekend at the Houston Astrodome in Houston, Texas, Sundvold participated in the NBA Three-Point Shootout; Sundvold was selected as a replacement for Trent Tucker of the New York Knicks, as Tucker withdrew due to an illness in his family. The Heat finished twelfth in the NBA in home-game attendance, with an attendance of 612,754 at the Miami Arena during the regular season.

=== Aftermath ===
Following the season, Hastings signed as a free agent with the Detroit Pistons, and Gray and Washington were both released to free agency.

Despite their location in Miami, the NBA placed the Heat in the Midwest Division of the Western Conference; this meant that the Heat were forced on some of the longest, and farthest road trips in the NBA during the 1988–89 season, as their closest divisional opponent was the Houston Rockets, which were located over 950 miles away in the city of Houston.

== Offseason ==
=== Expansion draft ===
Number	Player	Position	Team
1	Arvid Kramer	Power forward/center	Dallas Mavericks
3	Billy Thompson	Small forward	Los Angeles Lakers
5	Fred Roberts	Power forward	Boston Celtics
7	Scott Hastings	Center	Atlanta Hawks
9	Jon Sundvold	Shooting guard	San Antonio Spurs
11	Kevin Williams	Point guard	Seattle SuperSonics
13	Hansi Gnad	Center	Philadelphia 76ers
15	Darnell Valentine	Point guard	Los Angeles Clippers
17	Dwayne Washington	Point guard	New Jersey Nets
19	Andre Turner	Point guard	Houston Rockets
21	Conner Henry	Shooting guard	Sacramento Kings
23	John Stroeder	Power forward	Milwaukee Bucks

=== Draft picks ===
Round	Pick	Player	Position	Nationality	School/Club team
1	9	Rony Seikaly	C	Lebanon	Syracuse
1	20	Kevin Edwards	SG	United States	DePaul
2	33	Grant Long	PF	United States	Eastern Michigan
2	35	Sylvester Gray	SF	United States	Memphis
2	40	Orlando Graham	F	United States	Auburn-Montgomery
3	59	Nate Johnston	F	United States	Tampa

== Roster ==
1988–89 Miami Heat roster
Players

Pos.	No.	Player	Height	Weight	DOB	From
F/C	42	Pat Cummings	6 ft 9 in (2.06 m)	230 lb (104 kg)	1956–07–11	Cincinnati
G	21	Kevin Edwards	6 ft 3 in (1.91 m)	190 lb (86 kg)	1965–10–30	DePaul
F	40	Sylvester Gray	6 ft 6 in (1.98 m)	230 lb (104 kg)	1967–07–08	Memphis
C	44	Scott Hastings	6 ft 10 in (2.08 m)	235 lb (107 kg)	1960–06–03	Arkansas
F	43	Grant Long	6 ft 8 in (2.03 m)	225 lb (102 kg)	1966–03–12	Eastern Michigan
G	11	Craig Neal	6 ft 5 in (1.96 m)	165 lb (75 kg)	1964–02–16	Georgia Tech
F	41	Dave Popson	6 ft 10 in (2.08 m)	220 lb (100 kg)	1964–05–17	North Carolina
C	4	Rony Seikaly	6 ft 11 in (2.11 m)	230 lb (104 kg)	1965–05–10	Syracuse
C	45	John Shasky	6 ft 11 in (2.11 m)	235 lb (107 kg)	1964–07–31	Minnesota
G	2	Rory Sparrow	6 ft 2 in (1.88 m)	175 lb (79 kg)	1958–06–12	Villanova
G	20	Jon Sundvold	6 ft 2 in (1.88 m)	170 lb (77 kg)	1961–07–02	Missouri
F	55	Billy Thompson	6 ft 7 in (2.01 m)	195 lb (88 kg)	1963–12–01	Louisville
G	31	Dwayne Washington	6 ft 2 in (1.88 m)	190 lb (86 kg)	1964–01–06	Syracuse

Coaches
Head coach
- Ron Rothstein
Assistant(s)
- Tony Fiorentino
- Dave Wohl

Legend
- (DP) Unsigned draft pick
- (FA) Free agent
- (S) Suspended
- Injured

Roster
Updated: April 12, 1989

== Regular season ==
=== Season standings ===
Midwest Division	W	L	PCT	GB	Home	Road	Div
y-Utah Jazz	51	31	.622	–	34–7	17–24	19–11
x-Houston Rockets	45	37	.549	6	31–10	14–27	19–11
x-Denver Nuggets	44	38	.537	7	35–6	9–32	18–12
Dallas Mavericks	38	44	.463	13	24–17	14–27	19–11
San Antonio Spurs	21	61	.256	30	18–23	3–38	9–21
Miami Heat	15	67	.183	36	12–29	3–38	6–24

#	Western Conference				
#	Team	W	L	PCT	GB
1	c-Los Angeles Lakers	57	25	.695	–
2	y-Utah Jazz	51	31	.622	6
3	x-Phoenix Suns	55	27	.671	2
4	x-Seattle SuperSonics	47	35	.573	10
5	x-Houston Rockets	45	37	.549	12
6	x-Denver Nuggets	44	38	.537	13
7	x-Golden State Warriors	43	39	.524	14
8	x-Portland Trail Blazers	39	43	.476	18
9	Dallas Mavericks	38	44	.463	19
10	Sacramento Kings	27	55	.329	30
11	San Antonio Spurs	21	61	.256	36
12	Los Angeles Clippers	21	61	.256	36
13	Miami Heat	15	67	.183	42

z – clinched division title
y – clinched division title
x – clinched playoff spot

=== Game log ===
1988–89 Game Log (15–67) (Home: 12–29; Road: 3–38)
November (0–12) (Home: 0–6; Road: 0–6)

Game	Date	Opponent	Score	Location	Attendance	Record
1	November 5	L.A. Clippers	L 91–111	Miami Arena	15,008	0–1
2	November 8	@ Dallas	L 88–92	Reunion Arena	16,129	0–2
3	November 9	@ San Antonio	L 93–117	HemisFair Arena		0–3
4	November 11	Houston	L 100–121	Miami Arena	15,008	0–4
5	November 15	Boston	L 65–84	Miami Arena	15,008	0–5
6	November 17	@ Houston	L 107–113	The Summit	16,288	0–6
7	November 18	Golden State	L 117–123 (OT)	Miami Arena	13,907	0–7
8	November 23	L.A. Lakers	L 91–138	Miami Arena	15,008	0–8
9	November 26	@ Milwaukee	L 93–103	Bradley Center	18,573	0–9
10	November 27	@ Cleveland	L 80–109	Richfield Coliseum		0–10
11	November 29	@ Charlotte	L 84–99	Charlotte Coliseum	23,388	0–11
12	November 30	San Antonio	L 101–105	Miami Arena	14,298	0–12

December (3–12) (Home: 2–6; Road: 1–6)

Game	Date	Opponent	Score	Location	Attendance	Record
13	December 2	Portland	L 102–105	Miami Arena	15,008	0–13
14	December 7	Sacramento	L 94–96	Miami Arena	15,008	0–14
15	December 9	Denver	L 110–121	Miami Arena	14,812	0–15
16	December 10	@ Chicago	L 88–111	Chicago Stadium	17,615	0–16
17	December 12	@ Utah	L 94–110	Salt Palace	12,444	0–17
18	December 14	@ L.A. Clippers	W 89–88	Los Angeles Memorial Sports Arena		1–17
19	December 15	@ Sacramento	L 90–94	ARCO Arena	16,517	1–18
20	December 17	Dallas	L 87–104	Miami Arena	15,008	1–19
21	December 20	@ Detroit	L 100–116	The Palace of Auburn Hills	21,454	1–20
22	December 21	Seattle	L 101–109	Miami Arena	15,008	1–21
23	December 23	Utah	W 101–80	Miami Arena	15,008	2–21
24	December 26	San Antonio	W 111–109	Miami Arena	15,008	3–21
25	December 27	Houston	L 93–101	Miami Arena	15,008	3–22
26	December 29	@ Seattle	L 99–129	Seattle Center Coliseum	14,794	3–23
27	December 30	@ Denver	L 83–109	McNichols Sports Arena	12,214	3–24

January (1–13) (Home: 1–5; Road: 0–8)

Game	Date	Opponent	Score	Location	Attendance	Record
28	January 3	@ Portland	L 95–119	Memorial Coliseum	12,848	3–25
29	January 4	@ Golden State	L 100–109	Oakland–Alameda County Coliseum Arena	12,831	3–26
30	January 6	@ L.A. Lakers	L 86–118	Great Western Forum	17,505	3–27
31	January 7	@ Phoenix	L 99–107	Arizona Veterans Memorial Coliseum	12,288	3–28
32	January 10	Utah	L 88–92	Miami Arena	15,008	3–29
33	January 12	@ Washington	L 100–106	Capital Centre		3–30
34	January 13	Milwaukee	L 101–107	Miami Arena	15,008	3–31
35	January 15	Indiana	W 118–117 (2OT)	Miami Arena	15,008	4–31
36	January 19	Chicago	L 108–112	Miami Arena	15,008	4–32
37	January 23	@ San Antonio	L 101–119	HemisFair Arena		4–33
38	January 24	@ Houston	L 93–118	The Summit	16,611	4–34
39	January 26	Denver	L 108–129	Miami Arena	15,008	4–35
40	January 29	@ Boston	L 103–121	Boston Garden	14,890	4–36
41	January 30	Golden State	L 98–105	Miami Arena	14,880	4–37

February (4–9) (Home: 4–5; Road: 0–4)

Game	Date	Opponent	Score	Location	Attendance	Record
42	February 2	Seattle	L 93–100	Miami Arena	14,798	4–38
43	February 5	Sacramento	W 102–98	Miami Arena	15,008	5–38
44	February 7	@ Utah	L 77–96	Salt Palace	12,444	5–39
45	February 9	@ Denver	L 92–117	McNichols Sports Arena	14,935	5–40
46	February 14	Cleveland	L 98–109	Miami Arena	15,008	5–41
47	February 16	@ Dallas	L 80–93	Reunion Arena	17,007	5–42
48	February 17	Charlotte	W 103–102	Miami Arena	15,008	6–42
49	February 19	Atlanta	W 124–115	Miami Arena	15,008	7–42
50	February 20	@ New Jersey	L 109–117	Brendan Byrne Arena		7–43
51	February 22	Philadelphia	L 108–139	Miami Arena	15,008	7–44
52	February 24	L.A. Clippers	W 111–91	Miami Arena	15,008	8–44
53	February 26	Portland	L 102–124	Miami Arena	15,008	8–45
54	February 28	Dallas	L 110–111 (OT)	Miami Arena	14,779	8–46

March (5–11) (Home: 4–4; Road: 1–7)

Game	Date	Opponent	Score	Location	Attendance	Record
55	March 2	@ New York	L 123–132	Madison Square Garden	14,054	8–47
56	March 3	Utah	L 95–107	Miami Arena	15,008	8–48
57	March 5	Detroit	L 100–109	Miami Arena	15,008	8–49
58	March 8	L.A. Lakers	L 87–127	Miami Arena	15,008	8–50
59	March 10	Denver	W 131–130 (2OT)	Miami Arena	15,008	9–50
60	March 11	@ Atlanta	L 78–111	The Omni	16,371	9–51
61	March 13	Phoenix	L 104–112	Miami Arena	15,008	9–52
62	March 15	@ L.A. Clippers	W 109–103	Los Angeles Memorial Sports Arena		10–52
63	March 17	@ Utah	L 96–118	Salt Palace	12,444	10–53
64	March 18	@ Denver	L 105–111	McNichols Sports Arena	15,068	10–54
65	March 20	@ Phoenix	L 97–115	Arizona Veterans Memorial Coliseum	12,315	10–55
66	March 22	New York	W 107–103	Miami Arena	15,008	11–55
67	March 25	San Antonio	W 107–105	Miami Arena	15,008	12–55
68	March 27	New Jersey	W 100–79	Miami Arena	15,008	13–55
69	March 29	@ Indiana	L 89–96	Market Square Arena		13–56
70	March 31	@ Philadelphia	L 93–114	Spectrum	14,127	13–57

April (2–12) (Home: 1–3; Road: 1–7)

Game	Date	Opponent	Score	Location	Attendance	Record
71	April 2	@ Dallas	L 96–98	Reunion Arena	16,846	13–58
72	April 4	@ San Antonio	87–109	HemisFair Arena		13–59
73	April 6	Washington	L 93–101	Miami Arena	15,008	13–60
74	April 8	Houston	W 107–104 (OT)	Miami Arena	15,008	14–60
75	April 10	@ Sacramento	L 69–108	ARCO Arena	16,517	14–61
76	April 11	@ Golden State	L 98–114	Oakland–Alameda County Coliseum Arena	15,025	14–62
77	April 13	@ Seattle	L 111–116	Seattle Center Coliseum	11,267	14–63
78	April 14	@ Portland	L 86–97	Memorial Coliseum	12,880	14–64
79	April 16	@ L.A. Lakers	L 108–121	Great Western Forum	17,505	14–65
80	April 18	Dallas	L 99–103	Miami Arena	15,008	14–66
81	April 19	Phoenix	L 91–117	Miami Arena	15,008	14–67
82	April 22	@ Houston	W 91–89	The Summit	16,611	15–67

1988-89 Schedule

== Awards, records, and honors ==
- Kevin Edwards, NBA All-Rookie Second Team

== Player statistics ==
=== Regular season ===
Player	POS	GP	GS	MP	REB	AST	STL	BLK	PTS	MPG	RPG	APG	SPG	BPG	PPG
Grant Long	PF	82	73	2,435	546	149	122	48	976	29.7	6.7	1.8	1.5	.6	11.9
Rory Sparrow	PG	80	79	2,613	216	429	103	17	1,000	32.7	2.7	5.4	1.3	.2	12.5
Kevin Edwards	SG	79	62	2,349	262	349	139	27	1,094	29.7	3.3	4.4	1.8	.3	13.8
Billy Thompson	SF	79	58	2,273	572	176	56	105	854	28.8	7.2	2.2	.7	1.3	10.8
Rony Seikaly	C	78	62	1,962	549	55	46	96	848	25.2	7.0	.7	.6	1.2	10.9
Scott Hastings	C	75	6	1,206	231	59	32	42	386	16.1	3.1	.8	.4	.6	5.1
Jon Sundvold	SG	68	8	1,338	87	137	27	1	709	19.7	1.3	2.0	.4	.0	10.4
John Shasky	C	65	4	944	232	22	14	13	357	14.5	3.6	.3	.2	.2	5.5
Sylvester Gray	SF	55	15	1,220	286	117	36	25	440	22.2	5.2	2.1	.7	.5	8.0
Dwayne Washington	PG	54	8	1,065	123	226	73	4	411	19.7	2.3	4.2	1.4	.1	7.6
Pat Cummings	PF	53	28	1,096	281	47	29	18	466	20.7	5.3	.9	.5	.3	8.8
Craig Neal^{†}	PG	32	0	341	18	86	15	4	89	10.7	.6	2.7	.5	.1	2.8
Todd Mitchell^{†}	SF	22	0	320	47	20	15	2	118	14.5	2.1	.9	.7	.1	5.4
Anthony Taylor	PG	21	7	368	34	43	22	5	144	17.5	1.6	2.0	1.0	.2	6.9
Kelvin Upshaw^{†}	SG	9	0	144	13	20	7	0	57	16.0	1.4	2.2	.8	.0	6.3
Clinton Wheeler^{†}	PG	8	0	143	12	21	8	0	56	17.9	1.5	2.6	1.0	.0	7.0
Dave Popson^{†}	PF	7	0	38	11	2	0	1	11	5.4	1.6	.3	.0	.1	1.6

- ^{†} Denotes player spent time with another team in the season. Stats reflect time with the Heat only.
