= Jason Jackson (reporter) =

American sportscaster and writer (born 1972)

Jason Jackson (born May 12, 1972) is an American DR sportscaster and writer. He worked for ESPN from 1995 until 2002 before being dismissed for sending inappropriate messages to a female co-worker. He was best known as the host of NBA 2Night. Jason is currently the TV Host/Courtside Reporter for the Miami Heat on Bally Sports Sun and is a talk show co-host/analyst on SiriusXM NBA Radio.

== Education ==
Jackson graduated from Bowling Green State University in 1994, where he had served as a resident advisor at Bromfield Hall and as President of the Undergraduate Student Government.

== Career ==
In 2003, he hosted his own sports talk radio show in Hartford, Connecticut, called The Jax Show, and in September 2007, he returned to hosting The Jax Show weekday afternoons on WQAM in Miami. From January through October 2012, The Jax Show reappeared in the afternoons from 1-3 PM on the Miami Heat's flagship station WAXY.

Kelly Dwyer of SI.com wrote in his 2006 "NBA Announcers Report Card" that Jason Jackson might be the best side-line reporter in the business.
