= Will Manso =

Will Manso (born February 20, 1975, in Weehawken, New Jersey, United States) is an American TV journalist and host. He is currently the WPLG Local 10 sports director and lead sports anchor, as well as reporter and Miami Heat studio host for road broadcasts on Bally Sports Sun in Miami, Florida.

== Career ==
Manso began his on-air career in 1996 as a sportscaster at UMTV, the student-produced news station for the University of Miami. He helped develop a half-hour sports show called "Sportsdesk" and also anchored and reported for the school's newscast, Newsvision.

The New Jersey native left Miami for his first professional job in 1997 as the weekend sports anchor and reporter at KPAX in Missoula, Montana. He later worked for the now-defunct WOTV in Battle Creek, Michigan in 1998, before getting a job at WPLG in March 1999. Manso has served as a weekend sports anchor and reporter as well as a news anchor and reporter for the station. He was promoted to the position of sports director at WPLG in 2007 after his predecessor, former Miami Dolphins wide receiver Jimmy Cefalo, resigned his position to manage a wine business. In addition to his duties as sports reporter, he also hosted the WPLG singing competition show called "Gimme the Mic."

The 2022–23 season marked Manso's 10th as a member of the Miami Heat broadcast team for FanDuel Sports Network Sun, joining the studio for road games as the pregame, halftime and postgame host. He also works a number of home games in a reporter capacity, doing interviews with assistant coaches and postgame hits outside the opposing locker room.

In 2009, he was voted in a Miami Herald poll as the most popular sportscaster in the Miami-Ft. Lauderdale TV market. Manso has also served as a guest fill-in host on WQAM radio in Miami and 790 The Ticket. In 2017, he was voted the best sportscaster in Miami by the Miami New Times.

A Cuban-American, he is involved in a number of community events and often speaks at local schools. He also emcees numerous events throughout the year and is a member of the National Association of Hispanic Journalism. Manso has served as Emcee of the South Beach Wine & Food Festival.
