= Eric Reid (sportscaster) =

American sportscaster

Eric Reid is an American television play-by-play announcer for the Miami Heat and college football on Sun Sports.

Reid has been with the Heat since the team's inaugural season. He was the Heat's color analyst alongside Sam Smith for three seasons before taking over play-by-play duties in 1991, and has been their play-by-play announcer ever since. He has shared the broadcast booth with analysts including Dr. Jack Ramsay, Dave Wohl, Ed Pinckney, Mike Fratello, Tony Fiorentino, and John Crotty.

He is best known among Heat fans for bellowing, "Kaboom!" after Heat three-pointers and big plays. In 2017, Reid told The Palm Beach Post that he got the idea from a cabbie who was driving him and Ramsay to a game against the Chicago Bulls at United Center. The cabbie was an ardent Bulls fan, and recalled that he loved listening to Bulls radio broadcasts because announcer Neil Funk would bellow "Kaboom!" after a Bulls three-pointer.

Reid's broadcast career began at WHCU radio in Ithaca, New York, where he was the station's sports director and the radio play-by-play voice for Cornell University football, basketball, and lacrosse.

Prior to joining the Heat, Reid was the radio voice of Providence College from 1982 to 1988. He has also called basketball games for ESPN Plus and the University of South Florida, and football games for ESPN Plus, New England Sports Network, Brown University, the University of Miami, and the University of South Florida.

While at NESN, Reid also hosted the pre- and post-game shows for the Boston Red Sox, did play-by-play for the Pawtucket Red Sox, and was also the host and writer for the syndicated weekly television show, This Week in the Big East.

In 1990, Reid called the NCAA Lacrosse Championships for ESPN.

In 2013, Reid won an Emmy for best play-by-play announcer in his 25th season calling action for the Heat.

Reid is a 1979 graduate of Ithaca College and a native of Massapequa, New York. He currently resides in Boca Raton, Florida.
