= Dave LaMont =

American sports commentator

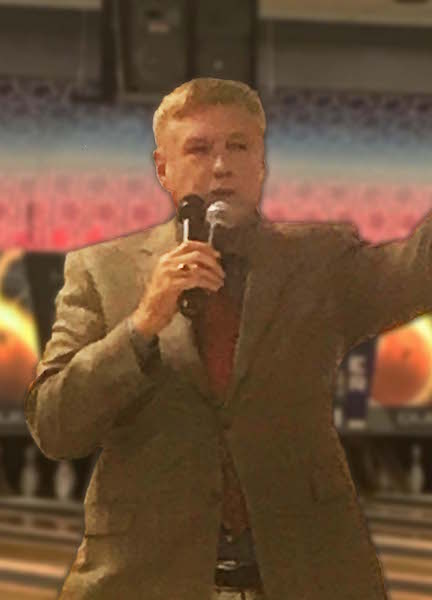
- LaMont at a PBA bowling tournament in 2019
- Education: University of Miami; B.A. Communications
- Title: ESPN/ABC commentator

Dave LaMont is an American sports commentator.

== Early career ==
LaMont served as a radio announcer for Miami Hurricanes basketball and baseball from 1998 until 2000, as well as serving as a host and substitute play-by-play announcer for the Miami Heat from 1993 to 1999.

LaMont was previously the voice of the Florida Atlantic Owls football program, from its inception in 2001 through the 2010 season. In 2010, LaMont made headlines for an angry rant about an apparent head-to-head hit during an FAU radio broadcast.

He spent six years as the co-host of NFL Sunday on Westwood One Radio, from 2002 until 2008, and was the spring training PA voice for the Baltimore Orioles during their last eight years in Fort Lauderdale from 2001 until 2009.

== ESPN/ABC ==
LaMont began working part-time for ABC Sports as a college football sideline reporter in 2004, adding play-by-play duties in 2005. He continued serving as a part-time college football play-by-play man for ESPN and ABC from 2006 until 2010.

In 2011, LaMont joined ESPN full-time, doing play-by-play for college football on ESPN, college basketball on the SEC Network and several other assignments as well.

In 2016, LaMont became the lead play-by-play broadcaster for selected PBA Tour events on ESPN.

== Fox Sports ==
Since 2019, LaMont has filled in on PBA broadcasts on FOX Sports, when current lead broadcaster Rob Stone is not available.

== Webcasts ==
LaMont is also seen on BowlTV, the streaming arm of the United States Bowling Congress (USBC), as a play-by-play announcer.
