= Brickell Magazine =

Brickell Magazine is a magazine headquartered in Miami, Florida. It is published by TAG Media, Inc. It is distributed to residences and businesses in Miami's financial district, which is often referred to as "The Manhattan of the South" and "The Wall Street of the South." The Publishers are Alex Avila and Alexis Cubilla. Jorge Arauz is the editor-in-chief.

Brickell Magazine was launched in November 2008. Its sister publication is Key Biscayne Magazine. Both publications are published and produced by the same team. The magazine's inaugural edition featured James Detorre, the founder of Brand Institute. Among their special editions are the annual "Top 20 Professionals Under Forty" and "The Dressed For Success Professionals."

In 2009, the magazine earned a Gold Ink Pewter Award for its May/June 2009 cover.
