= John Crotty =

American basketball player (born 1969)

Personal information
- Born: July 15, 1969 (age 57) Orange, New Jersey, U.S.
- Listed height: 6 ft 1 in (1.85 m)
- Listed weight: 185 lb (84 kg)

Career information
- High school: Christian Brothers Academy (Lincroft, New Jersey)
- College: Virginia (1987–1991)
- NBA draft: 1991: undrafted
- Playing career: 1991–2003
- Position: Point guard
- Number: 11, 12, 22, 25

Career history
- 1991–1992: Greenville Spinners
- 1992–1995: Utah Jazz
- 1995–1996: Cleveland Cavaliers
- 1996: Teamsystem Bologna
- 1997: Miami Heat
- 1997–1999: Portland Trail Blazers
- 1999: Seattle SuperSonics
- 1999–2000: Detroit Pistons
- 2000–2002: Utah Jazz
- 2002–2003: Denver Nuggets

Career highlights
- 2× Third-team All-ACC (1990, 1991); McDonald's All-American (1987); Second-team Parade All-American (1987)

Career NBA statistics
- Points: 1,903 (4.0 ppg)
- Rebounds: 502 (1.1 rpg)
- Assists: 999 (2.1 apg)
- Stats at NBA.com
- Stats at Basketball Reference

John Kevin Crotty (born July 15, 1969) is an American former professional basketball player. A 6'1" point guard from the University of Virginia, Crotty was undrafted, but played eleven National Basketball Association (NBA) seasons from 1992 to 2003. After retiring from the NBA, Crotty moved into sports broadcasting with the Miami Heat.

== Basketball career ==
=== High school ===
Crotty was a standout guard at Christian Brothers Academy (CBA) in Lincroft, New Jersey, where he developed a reputation as one of the top high school players in the country during the mid-1980s. As a senior, he averaged 23 points, 5 assists, 3 rebounds, and 3 steals per game, leading CBA to a 26–1 record and a ranking as one of New Jersey’s top teams.

Crotty was named a McDonald's All-American in 1987 and was selected to the second-team Parade All-American list the same year, recognizing him among the top high school basketball players nationwide.

Crotty drew interest from several elite college programs, including Notre Dame, North Carolina, Stanford, Villanova, and Virginia. He ultimately committed to Virginia, where he would go on to become one of the school’s most decorated players.

=== College ===
Crotty played collegiate basketball at the University of Virginia from 1987 to 1991, where he became one of the most accomplished guards in program history. He was a four-year starter for the Cavaliers and served as team captain during his junior and senior seasons.

Crotty holds the school’s single-season assist record with 214 during the 1989–90 season and previously held the all-time career assists mark at 683. His record was surpassed on February 18, 2023, by Kihei Clark during a game against Notre Dame.

Over his four-year career, Crotty scored 1,646 points and tallied 12 career double-doubles in points and assists. He was known for his steady leadership, passing vision, and free-throw accuracy, often ranking among the ACC leaders in assists and assist-to-turnover ratio.

Crotty received multiple conference and national honors. He was a third-team All-ACC selection in both 1990 and 1991 and was named to the All-ACC Tournament Team in consecutive years—second team in 1990 and first team in 1991. Nationally, he earned honorable mention All-America honors from both the Associated Press and The Sporting News following his junior season.

=== NBA ===
Crotty played for the Utah Jazz, Cleveland Cavaliers, Miami Heat, Portland Trail Blazers, Seattle SuperSonics, Detroit Pistons and Denver Nuggets. In his NBA career, Crotty played in 477 games and scored a total of 1,903 points. After retiring from professional basketball, Crotty became a sports analyst for the Miami Heat. Crotty is also a principal in the Miami office of Avison Young.

During his playing days, when making a long basket it was sometimes playfully called a 'Crotty Chop', a play on 'Karate Chop'.

== Broadcasting career ==
After retiring from professional basketball, Crotty transitioned into sports broadcasting. In 2005, he joined the Miami Heat as the team's radio analyst, bringing his on-court experience and insight to listeners across South Florida.

In November 2017, Crotty was promoted to the role of television color commentator for the Heat, succeeding longtime analyst Tony Fiorentino. Crotty joined veteran play-by-play broadcaster Eric Reid on the Bally Sports Sun broadcasts, offering in-depth analysis and commentary during live game telecasts.

Crotty has since become a fixture in Heat broadcasting, praised for his detailed breakdowns of in-game strategy, player development, and team culture. In addition to game-day commentary, he also appears on pregame and postgame shows, contributes to digital content produced by the team, and occasionally represents the Heat at community and fan engagement events.

== NBA career statistics ==
Legend
GP	Games played	GS	Games started	MPG	Minutes per game
FG%	Field goal percentage	3P%	3-point field goal percentage	FT%	Free throw percentage
RPG	Rebounds per game	APG	Assists per game	SPG	Steals per game
BPG	Blocks per game	PPG	Points per game	**Bold**	Career high

=== Regular season ===
Year	Team	GP	GS	MPG	FG%	3P%	FT%	RPG	APG	SPG	BPG	PPG
1992–93	Utah	40	0	6.1	**.514**	.143	.684	.4	1.4	.3	.0	2.6
1993–94	Utah	45	0	7.0	.455	.458	.861	.7	1.7	.3	.0	2.9
1994–95	Utah	**80**	0	12.7	.403	.306	.810	1.2	2.6	.5	**.1**	3.7
1995–96	Cleveland	58	**4**	10.6	.447	.296	.861	.9	1.8	.4	**.1**	3.0
1996–97	Miami	48	0	13.7	.513	.408	.844	1.0	2.1	.4	.0	4.8
1997–98	Portland	26	2	14.6	.322	.300	.941	1.2	2.4	.4	.0	3.7
1998–99	Portland	3	0	6.3	.500	**1.000**	**1.000**	.3	1.7	**.7**	.0	4.0
1998–99	Seattle	24	0	15.1	.405	.371	.851	1.3	2.4	.4	.0	6.1
1999–00	Detroit	69	0	13.6	.422	.413	.860	1.1	1.9	.4	**.1**	4.7
2000–01	Utah	31	0	8.5	.338	.571	.895	.9	1.1	.2	.0	2.1
2001–02	Utah	41	0	**19.6**	.471	.449	.864	**1.8**	**3.4**	.5	.0	**6.9**
2002–03	Denver	12	0	15.0	.341	.308	.600	1.3	2.4	.3	.0	3.4
Career		477	6	12.1	.431	.384	.837	1.1	2.1	.4	.0	4.0

=== Playoffs ===
Year	Team	GP	GS	MPG	FG%	3P%	FT%	RPG	APG	SPG	BPG	PPG
1993	Utah	1	0	3.0	**1.000**	–	–	1.0	1.0	.0	.0	**4.0**
1994	Utah	8	0	4.8	.364	**1.000**	**1.000**	.4	1.1	.1	.0	1.5
1995	Utah	3	0	8.0	.667	–	.600	.0	**2.0**	.3	.0	2.3
1996	Cleveland	2	0	4.5	–	–	**1.000**	.5	.5	**.5**	**.5**	1.0
1997	Miami	**15**	0	8.9	.394	.417	.857	.7	.7	.3	.0	2.5
2000	Detroit	3	0	**17.0**	.200	.000	**1.000**	**1.3**	1.3	.3	.3	2.0
2001	Utah	4	0	4.8	.000	–	**1.000**	.8	.8	.3	.3	.8
Career		36	0	7.5	.371	.412	.857	.6	1.0	.3	.1	2.0
