= WACC (AM) =

- Hialeah, Florida; United States
- Broadcast area: Miami-Fort Lauderdale
- Frequency: 830 kHz
- Branding: Radio Paz 830 AM - 96.1 FM

Programming
- Format: Spanish Religious

Ownership
- Owner: Pax Catholic Communications, Inc.

History
- First air date: November 8, 1984 (as WTIW)
- Former call signs: WTIW (1984–1987); WRFM (1987–1995); WXTO (1995–1997)

Technical information
- Licensing authority: FCC
- Facility ID: 28874
- Class: B
- Power: 4,100 watts day 1,000 watts night
- Transmitter coordinates: 25°46′22.00″N 80°25′16.00″W
- Translator: 96.1 W241DI (Hialeah)

Links
- Public license information: Public file; LMS
- Webcast: Listen Live
- Website: paxcc.org

WACC (830 kHz) is an AM radio station broadcasting a Spanish Religious format. Licensed to Hialeah, Florida, United States, it serves the Miami-Fort Lauderdale area. The station is currently owned by Pax Catholic Communications, Inc.

== History ==
The station went on the air as WTIW on November 8, 1984. On May 28, 1987, the station changed its call sign to WRFM, on April 3, 1995, to WXTO, then on December 1, 1997, to the current WACC,
