= Mike Inglis (sportscaster) =

Canadian sportscaster

Mike Inglis is a Canadian sportscaster. He is the former radio play-by-play voice of the NBA's Miami Heat.

Raised in Toronto, Ontario, Inglis is a graduate of Humber College. He began broadcasting in the early 1980s at CKAR in Oshawa, Ontario, providing play-by-play for the NASL's Toronto Blizzard and the OHL's Oshawa Generals. From 1984 to 1986, he was the play-by-play for Winnipeg Blue Bombers games on CFRW, where he was also the sports director. In 1987, he was briefly the radio play-by-play voice of the Indiana Pacers. He stayed in Indiana for a few more years, and served as the radio color commentator of the NFL's Indianapolis Colts from 1990 to 1991, alongside Bob Lamey.

In 1995, he became the first radio play-by-play man in Toronto Raptors history, broadcasting on CFRB 1010 alongside Paul Jones. After the 1997–98 season, the Raptors' radio rights were shifted to the Fan 590, and Inglis was subsequently hired by the Miami Heat in 1998. He was the radio voice of the Heat until his retirement on September 7, 2021.
