= Tony Fiorentino =

American television color commentator

Tony Fiorentino (born 1949) is an American television color commentator, most recently for the Miami Heat. Fiorentino has been involved with the Heat organization since it entered the NBA, joining the team in 1988 as an assistant coach under Ron Rothstein. He also served as an assistant coach for the Heat under Alvin Gentry and Pat Riley, and later served as an assistant coach with the Heat's WNBA sister team, the Miami Sol. He became the Heat's main television color commentator in 2004, replacing Mike Fratello. On June 9, 2017, The Miami Heat announced that Fiorentino would call his 15th and final season as the team's television analyst. On April 11, 2018, Fiorentino was honored in a halftime ceremony during the final regular season game against the Toronto Raptors. Fiorentino remains with the team, serving as both a Miami Heat Ambassador and as the director for the franchise's very popular summer basketball camp program.

Fiorentino played college basketball at Concordia College in Bronxville, New York. He then coached high school basketball at Mount Vernon High School, where he got to know rival coach Ron Rothstein, a relationship which later helped him get an assistant coaching position for Rothstein on the Heat. He also had a stint as a college assistant at Iona.
