= 2000–01 Milwaukee Bucks season =

NBA professional basketball team season

- Division champions
- Head coach: George Karl
- General manager: Ernie Grunfeld
- Owner: Herb Kohl
- Arena: Bradley Center

Results
- Record: 52–30 (.634)
- Place: Division: 1st (Central); Conference: 2nd (Eastern)
- Playoff finish: Eastern Conference finals (lost to 76ers 3–4)
- Stats at Basketball Reference

Local media
- Television: WCGV-TV; Midwest Sports Channel (Jim Paschke, Jon McGlocklin)
- Radio: WTMJ

The 2000–01 Milwaukee Bucks season was the 33rd season for the Milwaukee Bucks in the National Basketball Association.

== Season summary ==
=== Off-season ===
The Bucks had the 15th overall pick in the 2000 NBA draft, and selected center Jason Collier out of Georgia Tech University; however, the team soon traded Collier to the Houston Rockets in exchange for rookie center, and first-round draft pick Joel Przybilla from the University of Minnesota on draft day. The Bucks also selected shooting guard Michael Redd out of Ohio State University with the 43rd overall pick. During the off-season, the team acquired Lindsey Hunter from the Detroit Pistons, acquired Jason Caffey from the Golden State Warriors in a three-team trade, and signed free agents Jerome Kersey and Mark Pope.

=== Regular season ===
With the addition of Hunter, the Bucks got off to a rough start, losing nine of their first twelve games of the regular season, but then won 23 of their next 29 games while posting an eight-game winning streak in January, and holding a 29–18 record at the All-Star break. The Bucks finished in first place in the Central Division with a 52–30 record, and earned the second seed in the Eastern Conference; it was the franchise's best record since the 1985–86 season.

Ray Allen averaged 22.0 points, 5.2 rebounds, 4.6 assists and 1.5 steals per game, led the Bucks with 202 three-point field goals, and was named to the All-NBA Third Team, while Glenn Robinson averaged 22.0 points and 6.9 rebounds per game, and Sam Cassell provided the team with 18.2 points and 7.6 assists per game. In addition, off the bench, sixth man Tim Thomas contributed 12.6 points and 4.1 rebounds per game, along with 107 three-point field goals, while Hunter provided with 10.1 points, 2.7 assists and 1.2 steals per game, and also contributed 152 three-point field goals. On the defensive side, Caffey averaged 7.1 points and 5.0 rebounds per game, while Scott Williams contributed 6.1 points and 5.5 rebounds per game, and Ervin Johnson provided with 3.2 points, 7.5 rebounds and 1.2 blocks per game.

During the NBA All-Star weekend at the MCI Center in Washington, D.C., Allen and Robinson were both selected for the 2001 NBA All-Star Game, as members of the Eastern Conference All-Star team; it was Robinson's second and final All-Star appearance. In addition, Allen also won the NBA Three-Point Shootout, in which he participated in for the second consecutive year. Allen finished tied in eleventh place in Most Valuable Player voting, while Thomas finished in second place in Sixth Man of the Year voting, behind Aaron McKie of the Philadelphia 76ers, and head coach George Karl finished tied in fifth place in Coach of the Year voting.

The Bucks finished 13th in the NBA in home-game attendance, with an attendance of 683,125 at the Bradley Center during the regular season.

=== NBA playoffs ===
In the Eastern Conference First Round of the 2001 NBA playoffs, led by the trio of Allen, Robinson and Cassell, the Bucks faced off against the 7th–seeded Orlando Magic, a team that featured All-Star guard, and Most Improved Player of the Year, Tracy McGrady, Darrell Armstrong, and Rookie of the Year, Mike Miller. The Bucks won the first two games over the Magic at home at the Bradley Center, before losing Game 3 on the road in overtime, 121–116 at the TD Waterhouse Centre. The Bucks won Game 4 over the Magic on the road, 112–104 to win the series in four games; it was the first time the Bucks made it past the opening round of the NBA playoffs since the 1988–89 season.

In the Eastern Conference Semi-finals, the team faced off against the 6th–seeded Charlotte Hornets, a team that featured Jamal Mashburn, David Wesley, and second-year star Baron Davis. The Bucks won the first two games over the Hornets at the Bradley Center, and took a 2–0 series lead. However, the team lost the next two games on the road at the Charlotte Coliseum, before losing Game 5 to the Hornets at the Bradley Center, 94–86, as the Hornets took a 3–2 series lead. The Bucks managed to win the next two games, which included a Game 7 win over the Hornets at the Bradley Center, 104–95 to win in a hard-fought seven-game series, and advance to the Conference Finals for the first time since 1986.

In the Eastern Conference Finals, the Bucks then faced off against the top–seeded, and Atlantic Division champion 76ers, who were led by All-Star guard, and Most Valuable Player of the Year, Allen Iverson, All-Star center and Defensive Player of the Year, Dikembe Mutombo, and Sixth Man of the Year, McKie. The Bucks lost Game 1 to the 76ers on the road, 93–85 at the First Union Center, but managed to win the next two games, including a Game 3 home win over the 76ers at the Bradley Center, 80–74 to take a 2–1 series lead. The Bucks lost the next two games, but managed to win Game 6 over the 76ers at the Bradley Center, 110–100 to even the series; in Game 6, Allen scored 41 points and made 9 out of 13 three-point field-goal attempts. However, the Bucks lost Game 7 to the 76ers at the First Union Center, 108–91, thus losing in a hard-fought seven-game series. Williams, who had started every game during the Bucks' postseason run, was controversially suspended hours before Game 7 of the Eastern Conference Finals series, when a flagrant one foul was upgraded to a flagrant two foul after the game had ended.

The 76ers would advance to the 2001 NBA Finals, but would lose to the defending NBA champion Los Angeles Lakers in five games.

=== Aftermath ===
Following the season, Hunter was traded to the Los Angeles Lakers, while Williams was traded to the Denver Nuggets, and Kersey retired. Until 2019, the 2000–01 season was the last time the Bucks won 50 games, made it past the opening round of the NBA playoffs, and reached the Eastern Conference Finals.

== Draft picks ==
Round	Pick	Player	Position	Nationality	College
1	15	Jason Collier	C	United States	Georgia Tech
2	43	Michael Redd	SG	United States	Ohio State
2	49	Jason Hart	PG	United States	Syracuse

== Roster ==
2000–01 Milwaukee Bucks roster
Players

Pos.	No.	Player	Height	Weight	DOB	From
G	34	Ray Allen	6 ft 5 in (1.96 m)	205 lb (93 kg)	1975–07–20	Connecticut
G	24	Rafer Alston	6 ft 2 in (1.88 m)	190 lb (86 kg)	1976–07–24	Fresno State
F	35	Jason Caffey	6 ft 8 in (2.03 m)	256 lb (116 kg)	1973–06–12	Alabama
G	10	Sam Cassell	6 ft 3 in (1.91 m)	185 lb (84 kg)	1969–11–18	Florida State
F	21	Darvin Ham	6 ft 7 in (2.01 m)	220 lb (100 kg)	1973–07–23	Texas Tech
G	7	Jason Hart	6 ft 3 in (1.91 m)	180 lb (82 kg)	1978–04–29	Syracuse
G	11	Lindsey Hunter	6 ft 2 in (1.88 m)	195 lb (88 kg)	1970–12–03	Jackson State
C	40	Ervin Johnson	6 ft 11 in (2.11 m)	245 lb (111 kg)	1967–12–21	LSU New Orleans
F	25	Jerome Kersey	6 ft 7 in (2.01 m)	215 lb (98 kg)	1962–06–26	Longwood
F	44	Mark Pope	6 ft 10 in (2.08 m)	235 lb (107 kg)	1972–09–11	Kentucky
C	6	Joel Przybilla	7 ft 1 in (2.16 m)	245 lb (111 kg)	1979–10–10	Minnesota
G/F	22	Michael Redd	6 ft 6 in (1.98 m)	215 lb (98 kg)	1979–08–24	Ohio State
F	13	Glenn Robinson	6 ft 7 in (2.01 m)	240 lb (109 kg)	1973–01–10	Purdue
F/C	5	Tim Thomas	6 ft 10 in (2.08 m)	240 lb (109 kg)	1977–02–26	Villanova
F/C	42	Scott Williams	6 ft 10 in (2.08 m)	230 lb (104 kg)	1968–03–21	North Carolina

Coaches
Head coach
- George Karl
Assistant(s)
- Ron Adams
- Mike McNeive
- Don Newman
- Terry Stotts
- Mike Thibault

Legend
- (DP) Unsigned draft pick
- (FA) Free agent
- (S) Suspended
- Injured

Roster
Updated: November 24, 2000

== Regular season ==
=== Season standings ===
Central Division	W	L	PCT	GB	Home	Road	Div
y-Milwaukee Bucks	52	30	.634	–	31–10	21–20	19–9
x-Toronto Raptors	47	35	.573	5	27–14	20–21	18–10
x-Charlotte Hornets	46	36	.561	6	28–13	18–23	20–8
x-Indiana Pacers	41	41	.500	11	26–15	15–26	15–13
e-Detroit Pistons	32	50	.390	20	18-23	14–27	16–12
e-Cleveland Cavaliers	30	52	.366	22	20–21	10–31	11–17
e-Atlanta Hawks	25	57	.305	27	18–23	7–34	9–19
e-Chicago Bulls	15	67	.183	37	10–31	5–36	4–24

Eastern Conference
#	Team	W	L	PCT	GB
1	c-Philadelphia 76ers	56	26	.683	–
2	y-Milwaukee Bucks	52	30	.634	4
3	x-Miami Heat	50	32	.610	6
4	x-New York Knicks	48	34	.585	8
5	x-Toronto Raptors	47	35	.573	9
6	x-Charlotte Hornets	46	36	.561	10
7	x-Orlando Magic	43	39	.524	13
8	x-Indiana Pacers	41	41	.500	15
9	e-Boston Celtics	36	46	.439	20
10	e-Detroit Pistons	32	50	.390	24
11	e-Cleveland Cavaliers	30	52	.366	26
12	e-New Jersey Nets	26	56	.317	30
13	e-Atlanta Hawks	25	57	.305	31
14	e-Washington Wizards	19	63	.232	37
15	e-Chicago Bulls	15	67	.183	42

z – clinched division title
y – clinched division title
x – clinched playoff spot

=== Game log ===
2000–01 game log
Total: 52–30 (home: 31–10; road: 21–20)
October: 0–1 (home: 0–0; road: 0–1)

Game	Date	Team	Score	High points	High rebounds	High assists	Location Attendance	Record
1	October 31	@ Dallas	L 93–97	Ray Allen (26)	Darvin Ham (13)	Sam Cassell (7)	Reunion Arena; 16,600	0–1

November: 6–8 (home: 4–4; road: 2–4)

Game	Date	Team	Score	High points	High rebounds	High assists	Location Attendance	Record
2	November 2	@ Houston	L 93–115	Glenn Robinson (24)	Glenn Robinson (7)	Sam Cassell (10)	Compaq Center; 10,687	0–2
3	November 4	Detroit	W 97–88	Sam Cassell (20)	Glenn Robinson (8)	Robinson, Allen (6)	Bradley Center; 18,717	1–2
4	November 7	New York	L 89–103	Glenn Robinson (21)	Thomas, Allen (7)	Sam Cassell (6)	Bradley Center; 14,246	1–3
5	November 8	@ Indiana	L 97–108	Sam Cassell (29)	Ervin Johnson (10)	Sam Cassell (12)	Conseco Fieldhouse; 17,684	1–4
6	November 11	Minnesota	L 92–103	Ray Allen (40)	Ervin Johnson (6)	Sam Cassell (9)	Bradley Center; 18,717	1–5
7	November 15	Atlanta	W 84–74	Glenn Robinson (21)	Ervin Johnson (12)	Sam Cassell (6)	Bradley Center; 13,217	2–5
8	November 17	Cleveland	W 89–76	Ray Allen (23)	Glenn Robinson (8)	Sam Cassell (11)	Bradley Center; 13,874	3–5
9	November 18	@ Toronto	L 102–111	Ray Allen (29)	Glenn Robinson (13)	Sam Cassell (8)	Air Canada Centre; 19,800	3–6
10	November 22	Portland	L 84–93	Glenn Robinson (20)	Ervin Johnson (9)	Lindsey Hunter (7)	Bradley Center; 15,208	3–7
11	November 24	Charlotte	L 90–106	Ray Allen (21)	Jason Caffey (7)	Rafer Alston (7)	Bradley Center; 15,102	3–8
12	November 25	@ Washington	L 100–107	Ray Allen (37)	Cassell, Caffey (9)	Allen, Cassell (5)	MCI Center; 13,157	3–9
13	November 27	@ Orlando	W 104–95	Ray Allen (23)	Ervin Johnson (9)	Sam Cassell (6)	TD Waterhouse Centre; 12,841	4–9
14	November 28	@ Miami	W 102–101	Glenn Robinson (22)	Ervin Johnson (14)	Sam Cassell (5)	American Airlines Arena; 19,800	5–9
15	November 30	Boston	W 108–97	Glenn Robinson (25)	Ervin Johnson (8)	Sam Cassell (14)	Bradley Center; 13,247	6–9

December: 10–4 (home: 6–1; road: 4–3)

Game	Date	Team	Score	High points	High rebounds	High assists	Location Attendance	Record
16	December 2	@ Atlanta	L 94–101	Ray Allen (19)	Ervin Johnson (9)	Sam Cassell (5)	Philips Arena; 9,827	6–10
17	December 3	Indiana	W 92–80	Glenn Robinson (24)	Tim Thomas (12)	Sam Cassell (7)	Bradley Center; 15,446	7–10
18	December 6	@ New Jersey	W 109–87	Ray Allen (30)	Robinson, Johnson, Williams (7)	Sam Cassell (14)	Continental Airlines Arena; 11,420	8–10
19	December 7	Phoenix	L 96–104	Glenn Robinson (26)	Glenn Robinson (10)	Allen, Cassell (6)	Bradley Center; 14,236	8–11
20	December 9	Washington	W 99–91	Allen, Robinson (22)	Glenn Robinson (12)	Robinson, Cassell (7)	Bradley Center; 15,768	9–11
21	December 12	@ L.A. Lakers	W 109–105	Ray Allen (35)	Glenn Robinson (13)	Sam Cassell (7)	Staples Center; 18,997	10–11
22	December 13	@ Utah	W 111–102	Glenn Robinson (32)	Glenn Robinson (9)	Lindsey Hunter (5)	Delta Center,18,450	11–11
23	December 15	Toronto	W 104–97	Glenn Robinson (31)	Ervin Johnson (11)	Sam Cassell (8)	Bradley Center; 16,432	12–11
24	December 17	@ New York	L 97–100 (OT)	Glenn Robinson (23)	Glenn Robinson (11)	Glenn Robinson (5)	Madison Square Garden; 19,763	12–12
25	December 21	New Jersey	W 80–78	Allen, Thomas (16)	Robinson, Caffey (11)	Robinson, Allen (4)	Bradley Center; 13,439	13–12
26	December 23	Boston	W 104–99	Glenn Robinson (28)	Ervin Johnson (13)	Sam Cassell (6)	Bradley Center; 14,786	14–12
27	December 26	Orlando	W 89–77	Ray Allen (25)	Robinson, Johnson (9)	Allen, Cassell, Hunter (6)	Bradley Center; 16,089	15–12
28	December 28	@ Cleveland	W 107–89	Allen, Cassell (23)	Scott Williams (8)	Sam Cassell (6)	Gund Arena; 18,225	16–12
29	December 30	@ Denver	L 113–120	Glenn Robinson (31)	Glenn Robinson (9)	Lindsey Hunter (9)	Pepsi Center; 15,330	16–13

January: 11–4 (home: 7–1; road: 4–3)

Game	Date	Team	Score	High points	High rebounds	High assists	Location Attendance	Record
30	January 2	@ Chicago	W 104–70	Glenn Robinson (21)	Scott Williams (11)	Glenn Robinson (5)	United Center; 20,569	17–13
31	January 3	Cleveland	W 88–83	Ray Allen (25)	Tim Thomas (10)	Glenn Robinson (7)	Bradley Center; 13,817	18–13
32	January 5	@ Portland	L 115–119	Tim Thomas (39)	Glenn Robinson (7)	Sam Cassell (10)	Rose Garden; 20,580	18–14
33	January 7	@ Vancouver	L 117–120	Glenn Robinson (31)	Sam Cassell (8)	Ray Allen (7)	General Motors Place; 11,771	18–15
34	January 9	Washington	W 99–95	Sam Cassell (23)	Tim Thomas (11)	Sam Cassell (7)	Bradley Center; 13,397	19–15
35	January 11	Dallas	W 102–94	Sam Cassell (21)	Glenn Robinson (10)	Sam Cassell (9)	Bradley Center; 15,675	20–15
36	January 13	New Jersey	W 115–81	Glenn Robinson (35)	Scott Williams (7)	Sam Cassell (13)	Bradley Center; 18,717	21–15
37	January 15	@ Washington	W 101–95	Glenn Robinson (22)	Ervin Johnson (8)	Sam Cassell (6)	MCI Center; 15,633	22–15
38	January 16	L.A. Clippers	W 112–91	Ray Allen (32)	Glenn Robinson (12)	Sam Cassell (14)	Bradley Center; 15,267	23–15
39	January 19	@ Charlotte	W 105–98	Sam Cassell (23)	Sam Cassell (8)	Ray Allen (7)	Charlotte Coliseum; 16,436	24–15
40	January 21	@ Detroit	W 102–98	Glenn Robinson (26)	Robinson, Williams (8)	Sam Cassell (7)	The Palace of Auburn Hills; 13,357	25–15
41	January 23	New York	W 105–91	Sam Cassell (22)	Ervin Johnson (10)	Robinson, Cassell (6)	Bradley Center; 18,717	26–15
42	January 27	Detroit	L 103–108	Glenn Robinson (34)	Ray Allen (10)	Sam Cassell (16)	Bradley Center; 18,717	26–16
43	January 29	@ Minnesota	L 96–99	Glenn Robinson (25)	Ervin Johnson (12)	Rafer Alston (8)	Target Center; 17,171	26–17
44	January 31	Denver	W 116–111	Ray Allen (32)	Tim Thomas (8)	Ray Allen (11)	Bradley Center; 15,786	27–17

February: 8–4 (home: 5–2; road: 3–2)

Game	Date	Team	Score	High points	High rebounds	High assists	Location Attendance	Record
45	February 3	Indiana	W 104–85	Sam Cassell (23)	Scott Williams (9)	Sam Cassell (9)	Bradley Center; 17,517	28–17
46	February 6	Sacramento	W 112–109	Sam Cassell (29)	Ervin Johnson (9)	Sam Cassell (12)	Bradley Center; 17,329	29–17
47	February 7	@ Boston	L 91–94	Tim Thomas (21)	Glenn Robinson (15)	Ray Allen (11)	FleetCenter; 13,493	29–18
48	February 13	Philadelphia	L 104–107	Glenn Robinson (28)	Ervin Johnson (14)	Sam Cassell (13)	Bradley Center; 18,717	29–19
49	February 14	@ Atlanta	W 102–98	Sam Cassell (25)	Ervin Johnson (11)	Sam Cassell (7)	Philips Arena; 11,653	30–19
50	February 17	Charlotte	L 93–103	Ray Allen (30)	Joel Przybilla (9)	Sam Cassell (13)	Bradley Center; 18,717	30–20
51	February 19	San Antonio	W 102–98	Robinson, Allen (23)	Jason Caffey (11)	Sam Cassell (9)	Bradley Center; 16,487	31–20
52	February 20	@ Chicago	W 101–92	Ray Allen (34)	Allen, Caffey (11)	Sam Cassell (5)	United Center; 21,558	32–20
53	February 23	Vancouver	W 93–81	Ray Allen (29)	Scott Williams (11)	Allen, Cassell (7)	Bradley Center; 17,682	33–20
54	February 25	Golden State	W 122–95	Glenn Robinson (45)	Ervin Johnson (15)	Sam Cassell (10)	Bradley Center; 18,411	34–20
55	February 26	@ Philadelphia	W 98–91	Ray Allen (42)	Ervin Johnson (10)	Ray Allen (7)	First Union Center; 20,324	35–20
56	February 28	@ Indiana	L 86–99	Lindsey Hunter (21)	Scott Williams (8)	Ray Allen (5)	Conseco Fieldhouse; 17,259	35–21

March: 11–5 (home: 6–2; road: 5–3)

Game	Date	Team	Score	High points	High rebounds	High assists	Location Attendance	Record
57	March 1	Houston	L 91–108	Sam Cassell (23)	Caffey, Williams (7)	Sam Cassell (9)	Bradley Center; 15,426	35–22
58	March 3	Chicago	W 126–122 (2OT)	Sam Cassell (40)	Ervin Johnson (13)	Sam Cassell (10)	Bradley Center; 18,717	36–22
59	March 5	@ New Jersey	W 107–100	Ray Allen (23)	Allen, Robinson (8)	Cassell, Robinson, Hunter (5)	Continental Airlines Arena; 3,216	37–22
60	March 7	@ Boston	W 101–94	Sam Cassell (24)	Robinson, Thomas (10)	Sam Cassell (7)	FleetCenter; 14,818	38–22
61	March 10	@ Charlotte	L 90–100	Ray Allen (32)	Glenn Robinson (10)	Sam Cassell (8)	Charlotte Coliseum; 18,472	38–23
62	March 11	@ Cleveland	L 110–124	Glenn Robinson (32)	Glenn Robinson (6)	Sam Cassell (13)	Gund Arena; 13,235	38–24
63	March 13	@ Toronto	W 101–97	Ray Allen (29)	Mark Pope (6)	Ray Allen (7)	Air Canada Centre; 19,800	39–24
64	March 15	Seattle	L 102–108	Glenn Robinson (21)	Ervin Johnson (9)	Sam Cassell (11)	Bradley Center; 16,112	39–25
65	March 17	Philadelphia	W 87–78	Tim Thomas (22)	Ervin Johnson (10)	Ray Allen (10)	Bradley Center; 18,717	40–25
66	March 18	@ Detroit	W 100–96	Sam Cassell (21)	Ray Allen (8)	Cassell, Hunter (5)	The Palace of Auburn Hills; 12,953	41–25
67	March 21	L.A. Lakers	W 107–100	Sam Cassell (27)	Ervin Johnson (6)	Allen, Robinson (5)	Bradley Center; 18,717	42–25
68	March 23	Orlando	W 115–103	Glenn Robinson (26)	Ray Allen (10)	Sam Cassell (10)	Bradley Center; 18,717	43–25
69	March 25	Atlanta	W 105–98	Ray Allen (27)	Ray Allen (11)	Sam Cassell (11)	Bradley Center; 18,717	44–25
70	March 26	@ Philadelphia	L 78–90	Sam Cassell (20)	Ervin Johnson (10)	Sam Cassell (5)	First Union Center; 20,561	44–26
71	March 29	Miami	W 104–96	Glenn Robinson (27)	Ervin Johnson (13)	Ray Allen (8)	Bradley Center; 18,574	45–26
72	March 31	@ San Antonio	W 86–77	Sam Cassell (24)	Ray Allen (11)	Sam Cassell (9)	Alamodome; 35,944	46–26

April: 6–4 (home: 3–0; road: 3–4)

Game	Date	Team	Score	High points	High rebounds	High assists	Location Attendance	Record
73	April 1	@ Phoenix	L 99–106	Ray Allen (31)	Darvin Ham (10)	Rafer Alston (8)	America West Arena; 18,464	46–27
74	April 3	@ Sacramento	W 107–101	Sam Cassell (33)	Ervin Johnson (14)	Lindsey Hunter (6)	ARCO Arena; 17,317	47–27
75	April 4	@ Golden State	W 108–78	Robinson, Allen (26)	Glenn Robinson (13)	Sam Cassell (9)	The Arena in Oakland; 11,600	48–27
76	April 6	@ L.A. Clippers	L 110–113 (OT)	Glenn Robinson (31)	Glenn Robinson (11)	Cassell, Robinson (5)	Staples Center; 17,329	48–28
77	April 8	@ Seattle	L 88–101	Ray Allen (20)	Ervin Johnson (8)	Sam Cassell (8)	KeyArena; 15,575	48–29
78	April 10	Chicago	W 105–84	Scott Williams (24)	Scott Williams (14)	Sam Cassell (12)	Bradley Center; 18,717	49–29
79	April 12	Utah	W 115–93	Ray Allen (43)	Ervin Johnson (11)	Sam Cassell (9)	Bradley Center; 18,717	50–29
80	April 14	Toronto	W 112–86	Ray Allen (31)	Ervin Johnson (10)	Sam Cassell (9)	Bradley Center; 18,717	51–29
81	April 16	@ Orlando	W 101–89	Glenn Robinson (19)	Scott Williams (14)	Cassell, Allen (7)	TD Waterhouse Centre; 17,248	52–29
82	April 17	@ Miami	L 89–91	Glenn Robinson (22)	Ervin Johnson (7)	Rafer Alston (6)	American Airlines Arena; 16,500	52–30

2000–01 schedule

== Playoffs ==
2001 playoff game log
First round: 3–1 (home: 2–0; road: 1–1)

Game	Date	Team	Score	High points	High rebounds	High assists	Location Attendance	Series
1	April 22	Orlando	W 103–90	Scott Williams (19)	Scott Williams (16)	Sam Cassell (8)	Bradley Center; 18,717	1–0
2	April 25	Orlando	W 103–96	Ray Allen (27)	Ervin Johnson (13)	Ray Allen (7)	Bradley Center; 18,717	2–0
3	April 28	@ Orlando	L 116–121 (OT)	Ray Allen (27)	Sam Cassell (16)	Ray Allen (6)	TD Waterhouse Centre; 17,248	2–1
4	May 1	@ Orlando	W 112–104	Ray Allen (26)	Tim Thomas (10)	Sam Cassell (6)	TD Waterhouse Centre; 17,248	3–1

Conference Semi-finals: 4–3 (home: 3–1; road: 1–2)

Game	Date	Team	Score	High points	High rebounds	High assists	Location Attendance	Series
1	May 6	Charlotte	W 104–92	Ray Allen (26)	Ervin Johnson (12)	Glenn Robinson (11)	Bradley Center; 18,717	1–0
2	May 8	Charlotte	W 91–90	Ray Allen (28)	Ervin Johnson (12)	Ray Allen (9)	Bradley Center; 18,717	2–0
3	May 10	@ Charlotte	L 92–102	Glenn Robinson (23)	Scott Williams (10)	Sam Cassell (9)	Charlotte Coliseum; 17,392	2–1
4	May 13	@ Charlotte	L 78–85	Ray Allen (19)	Glenn Robinson (12)	Ray Allen (10)	Charlotte Coliseum; 18,756	2–2
5	May 15	Charlotte	L 86–94	Glenn Robinson (22)	Ervin Johnson (17)	Ray Allen (7)	Bradley Center; 18,717	2–3
6	May 17	@ Charlotte	W 104–97	Sam Cassell (33)	Ervin Johnson (13)	Sam Cassell (11)	Charlotte Coliseum; 23,509	3–3
7	May 20	Charlotte	W 104–95	Glenn Robinson (29)	Ervin Johnson (11)	Sam Cassell (13)	Bradley Center; 18,717	4–3

Conference finals: 3–4 (home: 2–1; road: 1–3)

Game	Date	Team	Score	High points	High rebounds	High assists	Location Attendance	Series
1	May 22	@ Philadelphia	L 85–93	Ray Allen (31)	Ervin Johnson (15)	Allen, Cassell (7)	First Union Center; 20,877	0–1
2	May 24	@ Philadelphia	W 92–78	Ray Allen (38)	Ervin Johnson (7)	Sam Cassell (11)	First Union Center; 20,998	1–1
3	May 26	Philadelphia	W 80–74	Sam Cassell (24)	Ervin Johnson (13)	Ray Allen (5)	Bradley Center; 18,717	2–1
4	May 28	Philadelphia	L 83–89	Glenn Robinson (20)	Ervin Johnson (17)	Ray Allen (6)	Bradley Center; 18,717	2–2
5	May 30	@ Philadelphia	L 88–89	Glenn Robinson (22)	Sam Cassell (12)	Allen, Cassell (4)	First Union Center; 21,087	2–3
6	June 1	Philadelphia	W 110–100	Ray Allen (41)	Ervin Johnson (12)	Sam Cassell (11)	Bradley Center; 18,717	3–3
7	June 3	@ Philadelphia	L 91–108	Ray Allen (26)	Tim Thomas (12)	Ray Allen (6)	First Union Center; 21,046	3–4

2001 schedule

== Player statistics ==
Legend
GP	Games played	GS	Games started	MPG	Minutes per game
FG%	Field-goal percentage	3P%	3-point field-goal percentage	FT%	Free-throw percentage
RPG	Rebounds per game	APG	Assists per game	SPG	Steals per game
BPG	Blocks per game	PPG	Points per game

=== Season ===
Player	GP	GS	MPG	FG%	3FG%	FT%	RPG	APG	SPG	BPG	PPG
Ray Allen	82	82	38.2	48.0	43.3	88.8	5.2	4.6	1.5	0.2	22.0
Glenn Robinson	76	74	37.0	46.8	29.9	82.0	6.9	3.3	1.1	0.8	22.0
Sam Cassell	76	75	35.6	47.4	30.6	85.8	3.8	7.6	1.2	0.1	18.2
Tim Thomas	76	16	27.4	43.0	41.2	77.1	4.1	1.8	1.0	0.6	12.6
Lindsey Hunter	82	5	24.4	38.1	37.3	80.2	2.1	2.7	1.2	0.1	10.1
Jason Caffey	70	33	20.9	48.8	0.0	67.3	5.0	0.8	0.5	0.4	7.1
Scott Williams	66	31	19.3	47.4	25.0	85.7	5.5	0.5	0.7	0.5	6.1
Darvin Ham	29	13	18.6	48.8	66.7	59.2	4.2	0.9	0.6	0.7	3.8
Jerome Kersey	22	2	11.0	46.4	0.0	50.0	2.0	0.7	0.6	0.4	3.3
Ervin Johnson	82	19	24.2	54.5	0.0	53.8	7.5	0.5	0.5	1.2	3.2
Mark Pope	63	45	15.0	43.7	20.8	62.9	2.3	0.6	0.3	0.4	2.4
Michael Redd	6	0	5.8	26.3	0.0	50.0	0.7	0.2	0.2	0.0	2.2
Rafer Alston	37	2	7.8	35.7	26.7	69.2	0.8	1.8	0.4	0.0	2.1
Jason Hart	1	0	10.0	100.0	0.0	0.0	0.0	1.0	0.0	0.0	2.0
Joel Przybilla	33	13	8.2	34.3	0.0	27.3	2.2	0.1	0.1	0.9	0.8

=== Playoffs ===
Player	GP	GS	MPG	FG%	3FG%	FT%	RPG	APG	SPG	BPG	PPG
Ray Allen	18	18	42.7	47.7	47.9	91.9	4.1	6.0	1.3	0.6	25.1
Glenn Robinson	18	18	38.2	42.9	38.7	89.3	6.4	3.3	0.6	1.3	19.4
Sam Cassell	18	18	37.9	39.6	33.3	86.6	4.6	6.7	1.1	0.2	17.4
Tim Thomas	18	0	26.6	44.8	43.1	81.5	4.5	1.6	0.5	0.6	11.3
Scott Williams	17	17	22.2	49.2	0.0	57.1	7.2	0.7	0.6	1.4	7.9
Ervin Johnson	18	10	32.1	57.4	0.0	62.5	10.8	0.6	0.5	2.1	5.4
Jason Caffey	18	0	16.5	38.1	0.0	64.5	4.1	0.8	0.2	0.3	3.8
Lindsey Hunter	18	0	16.1	24.2	15.1	72.7	1.7	1.9	0.8	0.2	3.6
Darvin Ham	14	6	9.4	60.0	0.0	55.0	1.4	0.4	0.3	0.5	2.1
Mark Pope	6	3	7.7	50.0	0.0	0.0	2.0	0.3	0.3	0.0	1.7
Joel Przybilla	1	0	2.0	0.0	0.0	0.0	0.0	0.0	0.0	0.0	0.0
Rafer Alston	5	0	1.6	0.0	0.0	0.0	0.0	0.2	0.0	0.0	0.0

Player statistics citation:

== Transactions ==
=== Trades ===
June 27, 2000	To Milwaukee Bucks Jason Caffey; Billy Owens	To Cleveland Cavaliers J. R. Reid; Robert Traylor To Golden State Warriors Vinny Del Negro; Bob Sura
August 22, 2000	To Milwaukee Bucks Lindsey Hunter	To Detroit Pistons Billy Owens

=== Free agents ===
Player	Signed	Former team
Mark Pope	September 27, 2000	Indiana Pacers
Jerome Kersey	November 25, 2000	San Antonio Spurs

Player Transactions Citation:

== See also ==
- 2000–01 NBA season
