= 1998–99 Milwaukee Bucks season =

NBA professional basketball team season

- Head coach: George Karl
- General manager: Bob Weinhauer
- Owner: Herb Kohl
- Arena: Bradley Center

Results
- Record: 28–22 (.560)
- Place: Division: 4th (Central); Conference: 7th (Eastern)
- Playoff finish: First round (lost to Pacers 0–3)
- Stats at Basketball Reference

Local media
- Television: WVTV; Midwest Sports Channel
- Radio: WTMJ

The 1998–99 Milwaukee Bucks season was the 31st season for the Milwaukee Bucks in the National Basketball Association. Due to a lockout, the regular season began on February 5, 1999, and was cut from 82 games to 50.

== Season summary ==
=== Off-season ===
The Bucks received the ninth overall pick in the 1998 NBA draft, and selected power forward, and German basketball star Dirk Nowitzki; the team also selected power forward Pat Garrity from the University of Notre Dame with the 19th overall pick. However, the Bucks soon traded Nowitzki, and Garrity to the Dallas Mavericks in exchange for rookie power forward, and first-round draft pick Robert Traylor from the University of Michigan on draft day; the Mavericks then traded Garrity to the Phoenix Suns in a separate draft day trade. During the off-season, the Bucks signed free agents, three-point specialist Dell Curry, and Vinny Del Negro. The team also hired George Karl as their new head coach; Karl previously coached the Seattle SuperSonics, and led them to the 1996 NBA Finals, where they lost to the Chicago Bulls in six games.

=== Regular season ===
Under Karl and with the addition of Dell Curry, Del Negro and Traylor, the Bucks won five of their first six games of the regular season, and posted a six-game winning streak between February and March. At mid-season, the team traded Terrell Brandon to the Minnesota Timberwolves, and acquired Sam Cassell and Chris Gatling from the New Jersey Nets, in exchange for Elliot Perry in a three-team trade; however, Cassell only played just four games with the team due to an ankle injury he sustained with the Nets. In another mid-season trade, the Bucks traded Tyrone Hill, and second-year forward Jerald Honeycutt to the Philadelphia 76ers in exchange for second-year forward Tim Thomas, and Scott Williams, and also signed free agent Haywoode Workman. The Bucks played above .500 in winning percentage for the entire season, and finished in fourth place in the Central Division with a 28–22 record, earning the seventh seed in the Eastern Conference; the team qualified for the NBA playoffs for the first time since the 1990–91 season, ending a seven-year playoff drought.

Glenn Robinson averaged 18.4 points and 5.9 rebounds per game, while Ray Allen averaged 17.1 points and 3.6 assists per game, and led the Bucks with 74 three-point field goals, and Cassell provided the team with 13.8 points, 4.3 assists and 1.5 steals per game off the bench during his short four-game stint. In addition, Dell Curry contributed 10.1 points per game and 69 three-point field goals off the bench, while shooting .476 in three-point field-goal percentage, while Thomas provided with 8.5 points per game in 33 games, and Armen Gilliam averaged 8.3 points and 3.7 rebounds per game. Meanwhile, Gatling contributed 6.3 points and 3.8 rebounds per game in 30 games, Workman provided with 6.9 points and 5.9 assists per game, and Del Negro contributed 5.9 points and 3.6 assists per game. On the defensive side, Traylor was the team's starting center, averaging 5.3 points and 3.7 rebounds per game, while off the bench, Ervin Johnson averaged 5.1 points and 6.4 rebounds per game, and Michael Curry contributed 4.9 points per game.

Robinson finished tied in 16th place in Most Valuable Player voting, while Dell Curry finished tied in fifth place in Sixth Man of the Year voting; Workman finished tied in tenth place in Most Improved Player voting, Michael Curry finished tied in seventh place in Defensive Player of the Year voting, and Karl finished tied in eighth place in Coach of the Year voting. The Bucks finished 22nd in the NBA in home-game attendance, with an attendance of 381,948 at the Bradley Center during the regular season.

=== NBA playoffs ===
In the Eastern Conference First Round of the 1999 NBA playoffs, the Bucks faced off against the 2nd–seeded, and Central Division champion Indiana Pacers, who were led by All-Star guard Reggie Miller, All-Star center Rik Smits, and sixth man Jalen Rose. The Bucks lost the first two games to the Pacers on the road at the Market Square Arena, before losing Game 3 at home, 99–91 at the Bradley Center, thus losing the series in a three-game sweep.

=== Aftermath ===
Following the season, Dell Curry signed as a free agent with the Toronto Raptors, while Gatling and Gilliam were both traded to the Orlando Magic, and Michael Curry re-signed with his former team, the Detroit Pistons.

== Draft picks ==
| Round | Pick | Player | Position | Nationality | College / Club |
|---|---|---|---|---|---|
| 1 | 9 | Dirk Nowitzki | PF/SF | Germany | (Germany) DJK Würzburg |
| 1 | 19 | Pat Garrity | PF/SF | United States | Notre Dame |
| 2 | 39 | Rafer Alston | PG | United States | Fresno State |

The Bucks entered the draft with two first-round picks (one of which was acquired from the Cleveland Cavaliers) and one second-round pick. The Bucks used their 9th and 19th pick to draft future Hall-of-Famer Dirk Nowitzki and Pat Garrity, respectively, but traded their rights to the Dallas Mavericks for the rights to the 6th pick, Robert Traylor.

== Roster ==
1998–99 Milwaukee Bucks roster
Players

| Pos. | No. | Player | Height | Weight | DOB | From |
|---|---|---|---|---|---|---|
| G | 8 | Jerome Allen (IN) | 6 ft 4 in (1.93 m) | 184 lb (83 kg) | 1973–01–28 | Penn |
| G/F | 34 | Ray Allen | 6 ft 5 in (1.96 m) | 205 lb (93 kg) | 1975–07–20 | Connecticut |
| G | 20 | Sam Cassell | 6 ft 3 in (1.91 m) | 185 lb (84 kg) | 1969–11–18 | Florida State |
| G | 30 | Dell Curry | 6 ft 4 in (1.93 m) | 190 lb (86 kg) | 1964–06–25 | Virginia Tech |
| F | 12 | Michael Curry | 6 ft 5 in (1.96 m) | 210 lb (95 kg) | 1968–08–22 | Georgia Southern |
| G | 15 | Vinny Del Negro (injured) | 6 ft 4 in (1.93 m) | 189 lb (86 kg) | 1966–08–09 | NC State |
| F/C | 25 | Chris Gatling | 6 ft 10 in (2.08 m) | 220 lb (100 kg) | 1967–09–03 | Old Dominion |
| F | 10 | Armen Gilliam | 6 ft 9 in (2.06 m) | 230 lb (104 kg) | 1964–05–28 | UNLV |
| C | 7 | Paul Grant | 7 ft 0 in (2.13 m) | 255 lb (116 kg) | 1974–01–06 | Wisconsin |
| C | 40 | Ervin Johnson | 6 ft 11 in (2.11 m) | 245 lb (111 kg) | 1967–12–21 | LSU New Orleans |
| F | 13 | Glenn Robinson | 6 ft 7 in (2.01 m) | 240 lb (109 kg) | 1973–01–10 | Purdue |
| F | 5 | Tim Thomas | 6 ft 10 in (2.08 m) | 240 lb (109 kg) | 1977–02–26 | Villanova |
| C | 54 | Robert Traylor | 6 ft 8 in (2.03 m) | 290 lb (132 kg) | 1977–02–01 | Michigan |
| F/C | 42 | Scott Williams (injured) | 6 ft 10 in (2.08 m) | 230 lb (104 kg) | 1968–03–21 | North Carolina |
| G | 3 | Haywoode Workman | 6 ft 2 in (1.88 m) | 180 lb (82 kg) | 1966–01–23 | Oral Roberts |

Coaches
Head coach
- George Karl
Assistant(s)
- Ron Adams
- Mike McNeive
- Terry Stotts
- Mike Thibault
- Mike Woodson

Legend
- (DP) Unsigned draft pick
- (FA) Free agent
- (S) Suspended
- Injured

Roster

=== Roster Notes ===
- Shooting guard Jerome Allen was signed by the Bucks near the end of the regular season, but did not play for them.

== Regular season ==
=== Season standings ===
| Central Division | W | L | PCT | GB | Home | Road | Div | GP |
|---|---|---|---|---|---|---|---|---|
| y-Indiana Pacers | 33 | 17 | .660 | – | 18‍–‍7 | 15‍–‍10 | 15–7 | 50 |
| x-Atlanta Hawks | 31 | 19 | .620 | 2.0 | 16‍–‍9 | 15‍–‍10 | 15–8 | 50 |
| x-Detroit Pistons | 29 | 21 | .580 | 4.0 | 17‍–‍8 | 12‍–‍13 | 13–8 | 50 |
| x-Milwaukee Bucks | 28 | 22 | .560 | 5.0 | 17‍–‍8 | 11‍–‍14 | 13–11 | 50 |
| Charlotte Hornets | 26 | 24 | .520 | 7.0 | 16‍–‍9 | 10‍–‍15 | 12–10 | 50 |
| Toronto Raptors | 23 | 27 | .460 | 10.0 | 14‍–‍11 | 9‍–‍16 | 9–14 | 50 |
| Cleveland Cavaliers | 22 | 28 | .440 | 11.0 | 15‍–‍10 | 7‍–‍18 | 9–13 | 50 |
| Chicago Bulls | 13 | 37 | .260 | 20.0 | 8‍–‍17 | 5‍–‍20 | 4–19 | 50 |

Eastern Conference
| # | Team | W | L | PCT | GB | GP |
|---|---|---|---|---|---|---|
| 1 | c-Miami Heat * | 33 | 17 | .660 | – | 50 |
| 2 | y-Indiana Pacers * | 33 | 17 | .660 | – | 50 |
| 3 | x-Orlando Magic | 33 | 17 | .660 | – | 50 |
| 4 | x-Atlanta Hawks | 31 | 19 | .620 | 2.0 | 50 |
| 5 | x-Detroit Pistons | 29 | 21 | .580 | 4.0 | 50 |
| 6 | x-Philadelphia 76ers | 28 | 22 | .560 | 5.0 | 50 |
| 7 | x-Milwaukee Bucks | 28 | 22 | .560 | 5.0 | 50 |
| 8 | x-New York Knicks | 27 | 23 | .540 | 6.0 | 50 |
| 9 | Charlotte Hornets | 26 | 24 | .520 | 7.0 | 50 |
| 10 | Toronto Raptors | 23 | 27 | .460 | 10.0 | 50 |
| 11 | Cleveland Cavaliers | 22 | 28 | .440 | 11.0 | 50 |
| 12 | Boston Celtics | 19 | 31 | .380 | 14.0 | 50 |
| 13 | Washington Wizards | 18 | 32 | .360 | 15.0 | 50 |
| 14 | New Jersey Nets | 16 | 34 | .320 | 17.0 | 50 |
| 15 | Chicago Bulls | 13 | 37 | .260 | 20.0 | 50 |

z - clinched division title
y - clinched division title
x - clinched playoff spot

=== Game log ===
1998–99 game log
Total: 28–22 (home: 17–8; road: 11–14)
February: 6–5 (home: 2–2; road: 4–3)

| Game | Date | Team | Score | High points | High rebounds | High assists | Location Attendance | Record |
|---|---|---|---|---|---|---|---|---|
| 1 | February 6, 1999 | @ Charlotte | W 113–107 | | | | Charlotte Coliseum; 18,820 | 1–0 |
| 2 | February 9, 1999 | @ Toronto | W 91–77 | | | | Maple Leaf Gardens; 14,577 | 2–0 |
| 3 | February 11, 1999 | New Jersey | W 95–75 | | | | Bradley Center; 18,031 | 3–0 |
| 4 | February 14, 1999 | @ Orlando | L 82–85 | | | | Orlando Arena; 15,914 | 3–1 |
| 5 | February 16, 1999 | @ Philadelphia | W 93–92 | | | | First Union Center; 10,976 | 4–1 |
| 6 | February 17, 1999 | Chicago | W 91–83 | | | | Bradley Center; 14,682 | 5–1 |
| 7 | February 19, 1999 | @ Toronto | L 82–90 | | | | SkyDome; 14,888 | 5–2 |
| 8 | February 20, 1999 | Indiana | L 80–82 | | | | Bradley Center; 18,173 | 5–3 |
| 9 | February 23, 1999 | @ Chicago | W 90–88 | | | | United Center; 22,302 | 6–3 |
| 10 | February 26, 1999 | @ Denver | L 95–96 | | | | McNichols Sports Arena; 10,926 | 6–4 |
| 11 | February 28, 1999 | Philadelphia | L 76–87 | | | | Bradley Center; 17,586 | 6–5 |

March: 0–0 (home: 0–0; road: 0–0)

| Game | Date | Team | Score | High points | High rebounds | High assists | Location Attendance | Record |
|---|---|---|---|---|---|---|---|---|
| 12 | March 2, 1999 | @ New Jersey | W 94–86 | | | | Continental Airlines Arena; 15,180 | 7–5 |
| 13 | March 3, 1999 | Golden State | W 106–78 | | | | Bradley Center; 12,136 | 8–5 |
| 14 | March 5, 1999 | New York | W 88–87 | | | | Bradley Center; 16,843 | 9–5 |
| 15 | March 8, 1999 | Chicago | W 81–76 | | | | Bradley Center; 12,085 | 10–5 |
| 16 | March 9, 1999 | @ New York | W 87–86 | | | | Madison Square Garden; 19,763 | 11–5 |
| 17 | March 10, 1999 | Seattle | W 101–97 | | | | Bradley Center; 15,692 | 12–5 |

April: 0–0 (home: 0–0; road: 0–0)

| Game | Date | Team | Score | High points | High rebounds | High assists | Location Attendance | Record |

May: 0–0 (home: 0–0; road: 0–0)

| Game | Date | Team | Score | High points | High rebounds | High assists | Location Attendance | Record |

1998–99 schedule

== Playoffs ==
1999 playoff game log
First round: 0–3 (home: 0–1; road: 0–2)

| Game | Date | Team | Score | High points | High rebounds | High assists | Location Attendance | Series |
|---|---|---|---|---|---|---|---|---|
| 1 | May 9 | @ Indiana | L 88–110 | Ray Allen (24) | Glenn Robinson (7) | three players tied (3) | Market Square Arena; 16,560 | 0–1 |
| 2 | May 11 | @ Indiana | L 107–108 (OT) | Ray Allen (25) | Glenn Robinson (12) | Sam Cassell (11) | Market Square Arena; 16,608 | 0–2 |
| 3 | May 13 | Indiana | L 91–99 | Glenn Robinson (23) | Ray Allen (11) | Sam Cassell (12) | Bradley Center; 18,717 | 0–3 |

1999 schedule

== Player statistics ==
Legend
| GP | Games played | GS | Games started | MPG | Minutes per game |
| FG% | Field-goal percentage | 3P% | 3-point field-goal percentage | FT% | Free-throw percentage |
| RPG | Rebounds per game | APG | Assists per game | SPG | Steals per game |
| BPG | Blocks per game | PPG | Points per game |

=== Season ===
| Player | GP | GS | MPG | FG% | 3FG% | FT% | RPG | APG | SPG | BPG | PPG |
|---|---|---|---|---|---|---|---|---|---|---|---|
| Glenn Robinson | 47 | 47 | 33.6 | 45.9 | 39.2 | 87.0 | 5.9 | 2.1 | 1.0 | 0.9 | 18.4 |
| Ray Allen | 50 | 50 | 34.4 | 45.0 | 35.6 | 90.3 | 4.2 | 3.6 | 1.1 | 0.1 | 17.1 |
| Sam Cassell | 4 | 0 | 24.8 | 40.9 | 33.3 | 94.7 | 2.3 | 4.3 | 1.5 | 0.0 | 13.8 |
| Terrell Brandon | 15 | 14 | 33.7 | 40.9 | 25.0 | 83.9 | 3.5 | 6.9 | 1.6 | 0.2 | 13.5 |
| Dell Curry | 42 | 0 | 20.6 | 48.5 | 47.6 | 82.4 | 2.0 | 1.1 | 0.9 | 0.1 | 10.1 |
| Tyrone Hill | 17 | 17 | 30.4 | 42.4 | 0.0 | 56.8 | 7.9 | 1.0 | 1.1 | 0.5 | 8.6 |
| Tim Thomas | 33 | 26 | 18.9 | 49.5 | 32.7 | 61.4 | 2.8 | 0.9 | 0.7 | 0.3 | 8.5 |
| Armen Gilliam | 34 | 5 | 19.6 | 45.3 | 0.0 | 78.2 | 3.7 | 0.6 | 0.6 | 0.4 | 8.3 |
| Haywoode Workman | 29 | 29 | 28.1 | 42.9 | 36.2 | 78.7 | 3.5 | 5.9 | 1.1 | 0.0 | 6.9 |
| Chris Gatling | 30 | 1 | 16.5 | 48.2 | 14.3 | 36.2 | 3.8 | 0.7 | 0.8 | 0.2 | 6.3 |
| Vinny Del Negro | 48 | 7 | 22.8 | 42.2 | 43.3 | 80.0 | 2.1 | 3.6 | 0.7 | 0.1 | 5.9 |
| Robert Traylor | 49 | 43 | 16.0 | 53.7 | 0.0 | 53.8 | 3.7 | 0.8 | 0.9 | 0.9 | 5.3 |
| Ervin Johnson | 50 | 7 | 20.5 | 50.8 | 0.0 | 61.0 | 6.4 | 0.4 | 0.6 | 1.1 | 5.1 |
| Michael Curry | 50 | 4 | 22.9 | 43.7 | 6.7 | 79.7 | 2.2 | 1.6 | 0.8 | 0.1 | 4.9 |
| Elliot Perry | 5 | 0 | 9.4 | 52.9 | 100.0 | 50.0 | 1.6 | 2.4 | 0.8 | 0.0 | 4.0 |
| Scott Williams | 5 | 0 | 5.8 | 33.3 | 0.0 | 57.1 | 2.4 | 0.0 | 0.2 | 0.2 | 2.8 |
| Jerald Honeycutt | 3 | 0 | 4.0 | 40.0 | 0.0 | 50.0 | 0.3 | 0.0 | 0.3 | 0.0 | 1.7 |
| Adonis Jordan | 4 | 0 | 4.5 | 50.0 | 0.0 | 50.0 | 0.0 | 0.8 | 0.8 | 0.0 | 1.5 |
| Paul Grant | 2 | 0 | 2.5 | 50.0 | 0.0 | 0.0 | 0.0 | 0.0 | 0.5 | 0.0 | 1.0 |
| Jamie Feick | 2 | 0 | 1.5 | 0.0 | 0.0 | 0.0 | 1.0 | 0.0 | 0.0 | 0.0 | 0.0 |

=== Playoffs ===
| Player | GP | GS | MPG | FG% | 3FG% | FT% | RPG | APG | SPG | BPG | PPG |
|---|---|---|---|---|---|---|---|---|---|---|---|
| Ray Allen | 3 | 3 | 40.0 | 53.2 | 47.4 | 61.5 | 7.3 | 4.3 | 1.0 | 0.3 | 22.3 |
| Glenn Robinson | 3 | 3 | 39.3 | 41.2 | 50.0 | 88.9 | 8.3 | 1.7 | 1.0 | 0.7 | 20.7 |
| Sam Cassell | 3 | 3 | 34.0 | 50.0 | 0.0 | 87.5 | 2.0 | 8.7 | 1.0 | 0.0 | 15.3 |
| Tim Thomas | 3 | 3 | 20.0 | 44.4 | 0.0 | 58.3 | 4.0 | 0.3 | 0.3 | 0.3 | 7.7 |
| Michael Curry | 3 | 0 | 19.7 | 58.3 | 0.0 | 100.0 | 1.3 | 1.0 | 0.7 | 0.3 | 6.7 |
| Armen Gilliam | 3 | 0 | 11.7 | 40.0 | 0.0 | 100.0 | 1.7 | 0.3 | 0.7 | 0.3 | 5.7 |
| Robert Traylor | 3 | 1 | 15.0 | 77.8 | 0.0 | 50.0 | 4.0 | 0.7 | 0.7 | 1.3 | 5.3 |
| Ervin Johnson | 3 | 2 | 30.7 | 46.2 | 0.0 | 50.0 | 6.0 | 0.3 | 0.7 | 1.7 | 4.3 |
| Haywoode Workman | 3 | 0 | 17.7 | 36.4 | 0.0 | 83.3 | 1.0 | 2.3 | 1.0 | 0.0 | 4.3 |
| Dell Curry | 3 | 0 | 16.3 | 13.3 | 12.5 | 100.0 | 1.3 | 0.3 | 1.0 | 0.0 | 3.0 |
| Chris Gatling | 2 | 0 | 6.0 | 0.0 | 0.0 | 0.0 | 1.5 | 0.0 | 0.5 | 0.0 | 0.0 |

Player statistics citation:

== Transactions ==
=== Trades ===
| June 24, 1998 | To Milwaukee Bucks Robert Traylor | To Dallas Mavericks Pat Garrity; Dirk Nowitzki |
| March 11, 1999 | To Milwaukee Bucks Sam Cassell; Chris Gatling; Paul Grant | To Minnesota Timberwolves Terrell Brandon; Brian Evans To New Jersey Nets Chris Carr; Stephon Marbury; Elliot Perry |
| March 11, 1999 | To Milwaukee Bucks Tim Thomas; Scott Williams | To Philadelphia 76ers Tyrone Hill; Jerald Honeycutt |

=== Free agents ===
| Player | Signed | Former team |
| Dell Curry | January 22, 1999 | Charlotte Hornets |
| Vinny Del Negro | February 2, 1999 | San Antonio Spurs |

Player Transactions Citation:

== See also ==
- 1998-99 NBA season
