= Darvin Ham =

American basketball coach & player (born 1973)

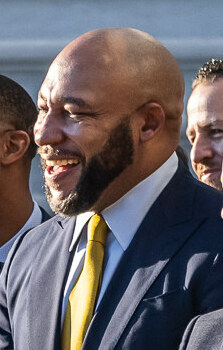
- Ham in 2021

Milwaukee Bucks
- Title: Lead assistant coach
- League: NBA

Personal information
- Born: July 23, 1973 (age 53) Saginaw, Michigan, U.S.
- Listed height: 6 ft 7 in (2.01 m)
- Listed weight: 240 lb (109 kg)

Career information
- High school: Saginaw (Saginaw, Michigan)
- College: Otero JC (1992–1993); Texas Tech (1993–1996)
- NBA draft: 1996: undrafted
- Playing career: 1996–2008
- Position: Small forward
- Number: 35, 31, 21, 8
- Coaching career: 2008–present

Career history

Playing
- 1996–1997: Denver Nuggets
- 1997: Indiana Pacers
- 1997–1998: Washington Wizards
- 1999: CB Granada
- 1999–2002: Milwaukee Bucks
- 2002–2003: Atlanta Hawks
- 2003–2005: Detroit Pistons
- 2006: Talk 'N Text Phone Pals
- 2007–2008: Albuquerque Thunderbirds
- 2008: Austin Toros

Coaching
- 2008–2010: Albuquerque Thunderbirds (assistant)
- 2010–2011: New Mexico Thunderbirds
- 2011–2013: Los Angeles Lakers (assistant)
- 2013–2018: Atlanta Hawks (assistant)
- 2018–2022: Milwaukee Bucks (assistant)
- 2022–2024: Los Angeles Lakers
- 2024–present: Milwaukee Bucks (lead assistant)

Career highlights
- As player: NBA champion (2004); As head coach: NBA Cup champion (2023); As assistant coach: NBA champion (2021); NBA Cup champion (2024)

Career NBA statistics
- Points: 1,139 (2.7 ppg)
- Rebounds: 963 (2.3 rpg)
- Assists: 229 (0.5 apg)
- Stats at NBA.com
- Stats at Basketball Reference

Darvin Demonte Ham Sr. (born July 23, 1973) is an American professional basketball coach and former player who is the assistant coach for the Milwaukee Bucks of the National Basketball Association (NBA). He previously served as the head coach of the Los Angeles Lakers of the NBA. He played college basketball for the Texas Tech Red Raiders before playing nine seasons in the NBA from 1996 to 2005. He won an NBA championship playing with the Detroit Pistons in 2004. Ham also had a brief international experience in Spain and later in the Philippines, as well as in the NBA Development League in 2007 and 2008. As an assistant coach, he won a second championship in 2021 and a second NBA Cup with the Milwaukee Bucks.

== College career ==
After attending Saginaw High School, Ham began his college basketball career at Otero Junior College in La Junta, Colorado. Ham transferred to Texas Tech University in 1993. While playing for the Red Raiders, he gained national attention by shattering the backboard on a slam dunk during the 1996 NCAA Tournament against North Carolina. The dunk shifted momentum for Texas Tech, catapulting them to the first Sweet Sixteen in school history. The dunk was featured on the cover of Sports Illustrated.

Ham won the NCAA slam dunk contest in 1996, following former college teammate Lance Hughes' win in 1995. In his 90-game college career, he averaged 8.1 points, 5.1 rebounds, 1.0 assists and 1.5 turnovers in 22.9 minutes, on top of .597 FG and .498 FT shooting.

== Professional playing career ==
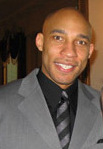
Ham in 2005

Ham was signed by the Denver Nuggets as a free agent on October 1, 1996. He was then traded by Denver to the Indiana Pacers for Jerome Allen in February 1997. Ham then signed as free agent with the Washington Wizards (1997), Milwaukee Bucks (1999), Atlanta Hawks (2002) and Detroit Pistons (2003). In his eight-season 417-game NBA career, he averaged 2.7 points, 2.3 rebounds and 1.8 fouls in 12.4 minutes, on top of .518 FG shooting, though he was not an outside threat, making only 4 3-point field goals in his career.

Ham competed in the 1997 NBA Slam Dunk Contest, and was a member of the 2004 NBA champion Detroit Pistons. His powerful slams earned him the nicknames "Dunkin Darvin" and "Ham Slamwich", as a fan favorite when playing for the Milwaukee Bucks, that carried on into the rest of his career. In his first postseason in Milwaukee, Ham started all five games of the Bucks’ 3-2 first round loss to the eventual Eastern Conference champion Indiana Pacers, while averaging 5 points, 5.8 rebounds, and 1.6 blocks per game. During his time in Milwaukee, Ham became the namesake of the "Hammer play", now a widespread NBA offensive concept.

In 2005, Ham was a participant in the Basketball Without Borders program that was located in Johannesburg, South Africa and later in 2015 he participated in the Dominican Republic.

On January 17, 2006, Ham was enlisted by the Philippine Basketball Association team Talk 'N Text Phone Pals as its replacement import for Damian Cantrell. He only played three games, averaging 16.7 points in the 2006 PBA Fiesta Conference Playoffs, as the Phone Pals eventually lost to Air21 Express in the series, 2–3.

In 2006, Ham served as a studio analyst for Fox Sports Southwest's coverage of the Dallas Mavericks' playoff run. He then became a member of the Orlando Magic summer league team in the Pepsi Pro Summer League from July 10–14, 2006. Ham later on appeared in the 2006 preseason with the New Jersey Nets.

In 2007, Ham had a preseason stint with the Mavericks but was waived on October 24, 2007. He was then drafted third overall in the 2007 NBA D-League draft by the Albuquerque Thunderbirds. On April 4, 2008, the Thunderbirds traded Ham to the Austin Toros.

== Coaching career ==
=== Assistant coach (2008–2022) ===
In October 2008, Ham was named an assistant coach for the Thunderbirds. He later served as their head coach. In October 2011, he became an assistant coach on Mike Brown's staff with the Los Angeles Lakers, where he worked with Kobe Bryant, Pau Gasol, and Dwight Howard in a player development role.

In 2013, he joined the Atlanta Hawks' coaching staff. He helped the Hawks reach the playoffs in four consecutive seasons including making it to the Eastern Conference finals in 2015. In 2014 and 2015, Ham was part of the coaching staff that led the Atlanta Hawks to a divisional title and the number 1 seed in the 2015 Eastern Conference Playoffs. Along with his help in bringing Atlanta to the playoffs, he also assisted four of their starting five into becoming 2015 NBA All-Stars. He also was heavily involved in the development of young players such as Dennis Schroder and Taurean Prince.

On June 7, 2018, Ham followed Mike Budenholzer to the Milwaukee Bucks, where during the 2018–2019 season, Budenholzer won the NBA's Coach of the Year award. Ham helped lead the team to its best record since 1972. In 2020–21, Ham helped coach Milwaukee to its second NBA title in franchise history, beating the Phoenix Suns in six games in the 2021 NBA Finals for their first championship since 1971.

=== Return to the Los Angeles Lakers (2022–2024) ===
Ham was hired as the head coach of the Los Angeles Lakers on June 3, 2022. In his first season as head coach, Ham and the Lakers started off with a record of 2–10 before qualifying for the 2023 NBA playoffs as the 7-seed. From there, they reached the Western Conference finals, becoming the second 7-seed in NBA history to reach the conference finals, before getting swept by the eventual champion Denver Nuggets. On December 9, 2023, Ham and the Lakers won the inaugural season of the NBA In-Season Tournament. They again qualified for the 2024 NBA playoffs as the 7-seed, where they lost in the first round in five games to the Nuggets, as they failed to protect a double-digit lead in all four of their losses in the series, including a 20-point second-half lead in Game 2. Following their playoff exit, Ham was dismissed on May 3, 2024, after two seasons with the Lakers.

=== Return to the Milwaukee Bucks (2024–present) ===
On June 10, 2024, Ham returned to the Milwaukee Bucks as their top assistant coach under Doc Rivers. On December 17, Ham won his second consecutive NBA Cup, as his teams improved to 14–0 in NBA Cup games.

== NBA career statistics ==
Legend
| GP | Games played | GS | Games started | MPG | Minutes per game |
| FG% | Field goal percentage | 3P% | 3-point field goal percentage | FT% | Free throw percentage |
| RPG | Rebounds per game | APG | Assists per game | SPG | Steals per game |
| BPG | Blocks per game | PPG | Points per game | **Bold** | Career high |
| † | Won an NBA championship |

=== Regular season ===
| Year | Team | GP | GS | MPG | FG% | 3P% | FT% | RPG | APG | SPG | BPG | PPG |
|---|---|---|---|---|---|---|---|---|---|---|---|---|
| 1996–97 | Denver | 35 | 3 | 8.9 | .525 | .000 | .485 | 1.6 | 0.4 | 0.2 | 0.2 | 2.3 |
| 1996–97 | Indiana | 1 | 0 | 5.0 | **1.000** | .000 | .500 | 0.0 | 0.0 | **1.0** | 0.0 | 3.0 |
| 1997–98 | Washington | 71 | 3 | 8.9 | .529 | .000 | .473 | 1.8 | 0.2 | 0.3 | 0.4 | 2.0 |
| 1999–00 | Milwaukee | 35 | **21** | **22.6** | .555 | .000 | .449 | **4.9** | **1.2** | 0.8 | **0.8** | **5.1** |
| 2000–01 | Milwaukee | 29 | 13 | 18.6 | .488 | **.667** | .592 | 4.2 | 0.9 | 0.6 | 0.7 | 3.8 |
| 2001–02 | Milwaukee | 70 | 2 | 17.3 | .569 | .143 | .504 | 2.9 | 1.0 | 0.4 | 0.5 | 4.3 |
| 2002–03 | Atlanta | **75** | 1 | 12.3 | .447 | .000 | .481 | 2.0 | 0.5 | 0.2 | 0.3 | 2.4 |
| 2003–04† | Detroit | 54 | 2 | 9.0 | .493 | .500 | **.600** | 1.7 | 0.3 | 0.2 | 0.1 | 1.8 |
| 2004–05 | Detroit | 47 | 0 | 5.9 | .459 | .000 | .387 | 0.7 | 0.1 | 0.1 | 0.1 | 1.0 |
| Career | | 417 | 45 | 12.4 | .518 | .250 | .494 | 2.3 | 0.5 | 0.3 | 0.4 | 2.7 |

=== Playoffs ===
| Year | Team | GP | GS | MPG | FG% | 3P% | FT% | RPG | APG | SPG | BPG | PPG |
|---|---|---|---|---|---|---|---|---|---|---|---|---|
| 1999–00 | Milwaukee | 5 | 5 | **28.8** | **.647** | .000 | .333 | **5.8** | **1.4** | 0.2 | **1.6** | **5.0** |
| 2000–01 | Milwaukee | 14 | **6** | 9.4 | .600 | .000 | .550 | 1.4 | 0.4 | **0.3** | 0.5 | 2.1 |
| 2003–04† | Detroit | **22** | 0 | 4.9 | .500 | .000 | .000 | 0.6 | 0.0 | 0.1 | 0.2 | 0.7 |
| 2004–05 | Detroit | 14 | 0 | 1.7 | .333 | .000 | **1.000** | 0.2 | 0.0 | 0.0 | 0.0 | 0.3 |
| Career | | 55 | 11 | 7.4 | .569 | .000 | .516 | 1.2 | 0.2 | 0.1 | 0.3 | 1.3 |

== Personal life ==
Ham is the son of Wilmer Jones-Ham, the first female mayor of Saginaw, serving from 2001 to 2005. When Ham was 14 years old, in 1988, he survived a gunshot wound to his face and neck.

Ham is married and his wife also went to Texas Tech.

His son, Darvin Ham Jr., played for Northwood University, and was an assistant coach at Northwood for 4 years, through the 2021–22 season. As of the 2022–23 season, Ham Jr. is an assistant coach for the Cleveland Charge of the NBA G League.

Ham is Christian. Ham has said:

First of all, I want to thank God. Coming from where I come from, I was raised in a household with strong, spiritual faith, belief in God and his Son Jesus Christ, so I want to start with that. Everything I’ve been able to overcome in my life, along with the people around me, it's been that spirit that was instilled in me as a youngster.

In June 2011, Ham traveled to Venezuela as a SportsUnited Sports Envoy for the U.S. Department of State. In this function, he worked with Kayte Christensen to conduct basketball clinics for 300 youth from underserved areas and met with Venezuelan sports officials. In so doing, Ham helped contribute to SportsUnited's mission to promote greater international understanding and inclusion through sport. He then followed up on these efforts and conducted a second set of clinics for more than 200 youth in Myanmar. This was the first State Department-sponsored sports exchange with Myanmar.

== Head coaching record ==
Legend
| Regular season | G | Games coached | W | Games won | L | Games lost | W–L % | Win–loss % |
| Playoffs | PG | Playoff games | PW | Playoff wins | PL | Playoff losses | PW–L % | Playoff win–loss % |

| Team | Year | G | W | L | W–L% | Finish | PG | PW | PL | PW–L% | Result |
|---|---|---|---|---|---|---|---|---|---|---|---|
| L.A. Lakers | 2022–23 | 82 | 43 | 39 | .524 | 5th in Pacific | 16 | 8 | 8 | .500 | Lost in Conference finals |
| L.A. Lakers | 2023–24 | 82 | 47 | 35 | .573 | 3rd in Pacific | 5 | 1 | 4 | .200 | Lost in First round |
| Career | | 164 | 90 | 74 | .549 | | 21 | 9 | 12 | .429 | |
