= 1998–99 Indiana Pacers season =

NBA professional basketball team season

- Division champions
- Head coach: Larry Bird
- President: Donnie Walsh
- General manager: Donnie Walsh
- Owners: Herbert Simon; Melvin Simon
- Arena: Market Square Arena

Results
- Record: 33–17 (.660)
- Place: Division: 1st (Central); Conference: 2nd (Eastern)
- Playoff finish: Eastern Conference finals (lost to Knicks 2–4)
- Stats at Basketball Reference

Local media
- Television: WTTV; Fox Sports Midwest (Al Albert, Quinn Buckner, Clark Kellogg)
- Radio: WIBC (Mark Boyle, Bobby "Slick" Leonard)

The 1998–99 Indiana Pacers season was the 23rd season for the Indiana Pacers in the National Basketball Association, and their 32nd season as a franchise. Due to a lockout, the regular season began on February 5, 1999, and was cut from 82 games to 50.

== Season summary ==
=== Off-season ===
During the off-season, the Pacers signed free agent Sam Perkins, who played in the 1991 NBA Finals with the Los Angeles Lakers, and the 1996 NBA Finals with the Seattle SuperSonics. The Pacers entered the regular season as a heavy favorite to win the NBA championship, because the defending NBA champions Chicago Bulls were broken up by their management after Michael Jordan retired.

For the season, the Pacers revealed new golden yellow pinstriped alternate road uniforms with a dark navy blue trim, and dark navy blue side panels on their jerseys and shorts; these uniforms would remain in use until 2005.

=== Regular season ===
With the addition of Perkins, the Pacers won 9 of their first 13 games of the season in February, which included a five-game winning streak. The team won 11 of their 17 games in March, and won their final four games of the season. The Pacers finished in first place in the Central Division with a 33–17 record, and earned the second seed in the Eastern Conference.

Reggie Miller averaged 18.4 points per game and led the Pacers with 106 three-point field goals, while Rik Smits averaged 14.9 points and 5.6 rebounds per game, and Chris Mullin provided the team with 10.3 points per game and 73 three-point field goals. In addition, sixth man Jalen Rose contributed 11.1 points per game off the bench, while other sixth man Antonio Davis provided with 9.4 points and 7.0 rebounds per game. Meanwhile, Dale Davis averaged 8.0 points and 8.3 rebounds per game, Mark Jackson provided with 7.6 points and 7.9 assists per game, Travis Best contributed 7.1 points and 3.4 assists per game, Perkins averaged 5.0 points and 2.9 rebounds per game, and Derrick McKey provided with 4.6 points and 3.2 rebounds per game, but only played just 13 games due to injury.

Jackson finished tied in 16th place in Most Valuable Player voting, while Rose and Antonio Davis both finished tied in third place in Sixth Man of the Year voting. The Pacers finished 19th in the NBA in home-game attendance, with an attendance of 404,536 at the Market Square Arena during the regular season.

=== NBA playoffs ===
In the Eastern Conference First Round of the 1999 NBA playoffs, the Pacers faced off against the 7th–seeded Milwaukee Bucks, who were led by Glenn Robinson, Ray Allen and Sam Cassell. The Pacers won the first two games over the Bucks at home at the Market Square Arena, before winning Game 3 on the road, 99–91 at the Bradley Center to win the series in a three-game sweep.

In the Eastern Conference Semi-finals, the team faced off against the 6th–seeded Philadelphia 76ers, a team that featured the league's top scorer Allen Iverson, Matt Geiger, and defensive shot-blocker Theo Ratliff. The Pacers won the first two games over the 76ers at the Market Square Arena, and then won the next two games on the road, including a Game 4 win over the 76ers at the First Union Center, 89–86 to win the series in a four-game sweep, and advance to the Conference Finals for the fourth time in six seasons.

In the Eastern Conference Finals, and for the second consecutive year, the Pacers faced off against the 8th–seeded New York Knicks, a team that featured All-Star center Patrick Ewing, Allan Houston, and sixth man Latrell Sprewell. The Pacers lost Game 1 to the Knicks at the Market Square Arena, 93–90, but managed to win Game 2 at home, 88–86 to even the series. In Game 2, the Knicks lost Ewing to an Achilles tendon injury, as he was out for the remainder of the series. One notable highlight of the series occurred in Game 3 at Madison Square Garden, in which Knicks forward Larry Johnson hit a three-point shot while being fouled by Antonio Davis, then completing a 4-point play after hitting a free throw; the Knicks won the game at home, 92–91 to take a 2–1 series lead. The Pacers won Game 4 over the Knicks on the road, 90–78 to tie the series at 2–2, but then lost Game 5 at the Market Square Arena, 101–94. The Pacers lost Game 6 to the Knicks at Madison Square Garden, 90–82, thus losing the series in six games, as the Knicks advanced to the NBA Finals for the second time in six seasons, becoming the first #8 seed to reach the Finals.

In the 1999 NBA Finals, the Knicks would lose to the San Antonio Spurs in five games.

=== Aftermath ===
This was also the Pacers' final season in which they played their home games at the Market Square Arena, as the team moved into their new arena, the Conseco Fieldhouse, the following season. Meanwhile, Antonio Davis was traded to the Toronto Raptors after six seasons with the Pacers.

== Offseason ==
=== NBA draft ===
Round	Pick	Player	Position	Nationality	College
1	25	Al Harrington	SF	United States	St. Patrick's High School (Elizabeth, New Jersey)

== Roster ==
1998–99 Indiana Pacers roster
Players

Pos.	No.	Player	Height	Weight	DOB	From
G	4	Travis Best	5 ft 11 in (1.80 m)	182 lb (83 kg)	1972–07–12	Georgia Tech
F	44	Austin Croshere	6 ft 9 in (2.06 m)	235 lb (107 kg)	1975–05–01	Providence
F	33	Antonio Davis	6 ft 9 in (2.06 m)	215 lb (98 kg)	1968–10–31	UTEP
F/C	32	Dale Davis	6 ft 11 in (2.11 m)	230 lb (104 kg)	1969–03–25	Clemson
F	25	Al Harrington	6 ft 9 in (2.06 m)	230 lb (104 kg)	1980–02–17	St. Patrick HS (NJ)
G	20	Fred Hoiberg	6 ft 4 in (1.93 m)	203 lb (92 kg)	1972–10–15	Iowa State
G	13	Mark Jackson	6 ft 1 in (1.85 m)	180 lb (82 kg)	1965–04–01	St. John's
F	9	Derrick McKey	6 ft 9 in (2.06 m)	205 lb (93 kg)	1966–10–10	Alabama
G	31	Reggie Miller	6 ft 7 in (2.01 m)	185 lb (84 kg)	1965–08–24	UCLA
F	17	Chris Mullin	6 ft 6 in (1.98 m)	200 lb (91 kg)	1963–07–30	St. John's
C	14	Sam Perkins	6 ft 9 in (2.06 m)	235 lb (107 kg)	1961–06–14	North Carolina
F	43	Mark Pope (injured)	6 ft 10 in (2.08 m)	235 lb (107 kg)	1972–09–11	Kentucky
G/F	5	Jalen Rose	6 ft 8 in (2.03 m)	210 lb (95 kg)	1973–01–30	Michigan
C	45	Rik Smits	7 ft 4 in (2.24 m)	250 lb (113 kg)	1966–08–23	Marist

Coaches
Head coach
- Larry Bird
Assistant(s)
- Rick Carlisle
- Dick Harter

Legend
- (DP) Unsigned draft pick
- (FA) Free agent
- (S) Suspended
- Injured

Roster
Updated: January 21, 1999

== Regular season ==
=== Season standings ===
Central Division	W	L	PCT	GB	Home	Road	Div	GP
y-Indiana Pacers	33	17	.660	–	18‍–‍7	15‍–‍10	15–7	50
x-Atlanta Hawks	31	19	.620	2.0	16‍–‍9	15‍–‍10	15–8	50
x-Detroit Pistons	29	21	.580	4.0	17‍–‍8	12‍–‍13	13–8	50
x-Milwaukee Bucks	28	22	.560	5.0	17‍–‍8	11‍–‍14	13–11	50
Charlotte Hornets	26	24	.520	7.0	16‍–‍9	10‍–‍15	12–10	50
Toronto Raptors	23	27	.460	10.0	14‍–‍11	9‍–‍16	9–14	50
Cleveland Cavaliers	22	28	.440	11.0	15‍–‍10	7‍–‍18	9–13	50
Chicago Bulls	13	37	.260	20.0	8‍–‍17	5‍–‍20	4–19	50

Eastern Conference
#	Team	W	L	PCT	GB	GP
1	c-Miami Heat *	33	17	.660	–	50
2	y-Indiana Pacers *	33	17	.660	–	50
3	x-Orlando Magic	33	17	.660	–	50
4	x-Atlanta Hawks	31	19	.620	2.0	50
5	x-Detroit Pistons	29	21	.580	4.0	50
6	x-Philadelphia 76ers	28	22	.560	5.0	50
7	x-Milwaukee Bucks	28	22	.560	5.0	50
8	x-New York Knicks	27	23	.540	6.0	50
9	Charlotte Hornets	26	24	.520	7.0	50
10	Toronto Raptors	23	27	.460	10.0	50
11	Cleveland Cavaliers	22	28	.440	11.0	50
12	Boston Celtics	19	31	.380	14.0	50
13	Washington Wizards	18	32	.360	15.0	50
14	New Jersey Nets	16	34	.320	17.0	50
15	Chicago Bulls	13	37	.260	20.0	50

z - clinched division title
y - clinched division title
x - clinched playoff spot

== Game log ==
=== Regular season ===
1998–99 game log
Total: 33–17 (home: 18–7; road: 15–10)
February: 9–4 (home: 4–1; road: 5–3)

Game	Date	Team	Score	High points	High rebounds	High assists	Location Attendance	Record
1	February 5, 1999	Washington	W 96–81				Market Square Arena	1–0
2	February 7, 1999	@ Detroit	L 98–107				The Palace of Auburn Hills	1–1
3	February 8, 1999	@ Cleveland	W 95–89				Gund Arena	2–1
4	February 10, 1999	@ Portland	L 92–100				Rose Garden	2–2
5	February 11, 1999	@ Vancouver	W 101–97				General Motors Place	3–2
6	February 14, 1999	@ L.A. Lakers	W 101–99				Great Western Forum	4–2
7	February 16, 1999	Miami	L 78–89				Market Square Arena	4–3
8	February 18, 1999	Philadelphia	W 99–95				Market Square Arena	5–3
9	February 20, 1999	@ Milwaukee	W 82–80				Bradley Center	6–3
10	February 21, 1999	New Jersey	W 80–79				Market Square Arena	7–3
11	February 24, 1999	Toronto	W 104–84				Market Square Arena	8–3
12	February 25, 1999	@ Cleveland	W 81–74				Gund Arena	9–3
13	February 26, 1999	@ Orlando	L 100–103 (OT)				Orlando Arena	9–4

March: 11–6 (home: 7–3; road: 4–3)

Game	Date	Team	Score	High points	High rebounds	High assists	Location Attendance	Record
14	March 2, 1999	Denver	W 88–81				Market Square Arena	10–4
15	March 3, 1999	@ Washington	W 106–95				MCI Center	11–4
16	March 5, 1999	Golden State	L 83–102				Market Square Arena	11–5
17	March 7, 1999	Miami	W 85–72				Market Square Arena	12–5
18	March 10, 1999	New Jersey	W 93–82				Market Square Arena	13–5
19	March 12, 1999	Milwaukee	W 109–104				Market Square Arena	14–5
20	March 14, 1999	Boston	W 99–96				Market Square Arena	15–5
21	March 16, 1999	Atlanta	L 79–85				Market Square Arena	15–6
22	March 17, 1999	@ Philadelphia	L 110–114				First Union Center	15–7
24	March 20, 1999	@ Miami	W 94–89				Miami Arena	17–7
25	March 22, 1999	Washington	W 90–86				Market Square Arena	18–7
26	March 24, 1999	@ Atlanta	L 102–103				Georgia Dome	18–8
27	March 26, 1999	@ New Jersey	W 100–91				Continental Airlines Arena	19–8
28	March 28, 1999	@ Boston	W 101–93				FleetCenter	20–8
29	March 29, 1999	Atlanta	L 82–83				Market Square Arena	20–9
30	March 30, 1999	@ New York	L 93–94				Madison Square Garden	20–10

April: 11–7 (home: 5–3; road: 6–4)

Game	Date	Team	Score	High points	High rebounds	High assists	Location Attendance	Record
31	April 1, 1999	@ Toronto	L 87–88				Air Canada Centre	20–11
32	April 2, 1999	@ Charlotte	W 87–81				Charlotte Coliseum	21–11
33	April 4, 1999	New York	W 108–95				Market Square Arena	22–11
34	April 5, 1999	@ Detroit	W 88–86				The Palace of Auburn Hills	23–11
36	April 9, 1999	Detroit	L 101–102				Market Square Arena	24–12
37	April 10, 1999	Charlotte	L 90–92				Market Square Arena	24–13
38	April 12, 1999	@ Toronto	W 109–99				Air Canada Centre	25–13
39	April 14, 1999	Orlando	W 83–80				Market Square Arena	26–13
40	April 16, 1999	@ Philadelphia	L 83–93				First Union Center	26–14
41	April 18, 1999	@ Miami	L 88–92				Miami Arena	26–15
42	April 19, 1999	@ Boston	W 120–104				FleetCenter	27–15
43	April 21, 1999	Milwaukee	W 108–100 (OT)				Market Square Arena	28–15
45	April 25, 1999	@ New Jersey	L 98–120				Continental Airlines Arena	29–16
46	April 27, 1999	Orlando	L 87–88				Market Square Arena	29–17
47	April 29, 1999	Charlotte	W 115–100 (OT)				Market Square Arena	30–17
48	April 30, 1999	@ Atlanta	W 92–90 (OT)				Georgia Dome	31–17

May: 2–0 (home: 2–0; road: 0–0)

Game	Date	Team	Score	High points	High rebounds	High assists	Location Attendance	Record
49	May 2, 1999	New York	W 94–71				Market Square Arena	32–17
50	May 4, 1999	Cleveland	W 100–78				Market Square Arena	33–17

1998–99 schedule

== Playoffs ==
1999 playoff game log
Eastern Conference First Round: 3–0 (home: 2–0; road: 1–0)

Game	Date	Team	Score	High points	High rebounds	High assists	Location Attendance	Series
1	May 9, 1999	Milwaukee	W 110–88	Rose (24)	D. Davis (15)	Jackson (12)	Market Square Arena; 16,560	1–0
2	May 11, 1999	Milwaukee	W 108–107 (OT)	Miller (30)	A. Davis (8)	Rose (8)	Market Square Arena; 16,608	2–0
3	May 13, 1999	@ Milwaukee	W 99–91	Miller (33)	D. Davis (7)	Jackson (10)	Bradley Center; 18,717	3–0

Eastern Conference semifinals: 4–0 (home: 2–0; road: 2–0)

Game	Date	Team	Score	High points	High rebounds	High assists	Location Attendance	Series
1	May 17, 1999	Philadelphia	W 94–90	Rose (27)	A. Davis (10)	Jackson (6)	Market Square Arena; 16,723	1–0
2	May 19, 1999	Philadelphia	W 85–82	Smits (25)	D. Davis (14)	Jackson (14)	Market Square Arena; 16,795	2–0
3	May 21, 1999	@ Philadelphia	W 97–86	Miller (29)	D. Davis (11)	Jackson (10)	First Union Center; 20,930	3–0
4	May 23, 1999	@ Philadelphia	W 89–86	Miller (23)	D. Davis (13)	Jackson (13)	First Union Center; 20,844	4–0

Eastern Conference finals: 2–4 (home: 1–2; road: 1–2)

Game	Date	Team	Score	High points	High rebounds	High assists	Location Attendance	Series
1	May 30, 1999	New York	L 90–93	Miller (19)	A. Davis, Jackson (7)	Jackson (11)	Market Square Arena; 16,575	0–1
2	June 1, 1999	New York	W 88–86	Jackson (17)	D. Davis (12)	Jackson (8)	Market Square Arena; 16,586	1–1
3	June 5, 1999	@ New York	L 91–92	Smits (25)	A. Davis (8)	Jackson (9)	Madison Square Garden; 19,763	1–2
4	June 7, 1999	@ New York	W 90–78	Rose (19)	D. Davis (12)	Jackson (4)	Madison Square Garden; 19,763	2–2
5	June 9, 1999	New York	L 94–101	Miller (30)	D. Davis (18)	Jackson (4)	Market Square Arena; 16,541	2–3
6	June 11, 1999	@ New York	L 82–90	Smits (20)	D. Davis (12)	Jackson, Miller (4)	Madison Square Garden; 19,763	2–4

1999 schedule

== Player statistics ==
=== Regular season ===
Player	POS	GP	GS	MP	REB	AST	STL	BLK	PTS	MPG	RPG	APG	SPG	BPG	PPG
Reggie Miller	SG	50	50	1,787	135	112	37	9	920	35.7	2.7	2.2	.7	.2	18.4
Dale Davis	PF	50	50	1,374	416	22	20	57	398	27.5	8.3	.4	.4	1.1	8.0
Chris Mullin	SF	50	50	1,179	160	81	47	13	507	23.6	3.2	1.6	.9	.3	10.1
Mark Jackson	PG	49	49	1,382	184	386	42	3	373	28.2	3.8	7.9	.9	.1	7.6
Rik Smits	C	49	49	1,271	275	52	18	52	728	25.9	5.6	1.1	.4	1.1	14.9
Antonio Davis	PF	49	1	1,271	344	33	22	42	463	25.9	7.0	.7	.4	.9	9.4
Jalen Rose	SF	49	1	1,238	154	93	50	15	542	25.3	3.1	1.9	1.0	.3	11.1
Travis Best	PG	49	0	1,043	80	169	42	4	346	21.3	1.6	3.4	.9	.1	7.1
Sam Perkins	PF	48	0	789	138	25	15	14	238	16.4	2.9	.5	.3	.3	5.0
Austin Croshere	PF	27	0	249	45	10	7	8	92	9.2	1.7	.4	.3	.3	3.4
Al Harrington	PF	21	0	160	39	5	4	2	45	7.6	1.9	.2	.2	.1	2.1
Derrick McKey	SF	13	0	244	41	13	12	4	60	18.8	3.2	1.0	.9	.3	4.6
Fred Hoiberg	SG	12	0	87	11	4	0	0	19	7.3	.9	.3	.0	.0	1.6
Mark Pope	SF	4	0	26	4	0	0	0	2	6.5	1.0	.0	.0	.0	.5

=== Playoffs ===
Player	POS	GP	GS	MP	REB	AST	STL	BLK	PTS	MPG	RPG	APG	SPG	BPG	PPG
Reggie Miller	SG	13	13	481	51	34	9	3	263	37.0	3.9	2.6	.7	.2	20.2
Mark Jackson	PG	13	13	451	59	112	14	1	146	34.7	4.5	8.6	1.1	.1	11.2
Dale Davis	PF	13	13	394	132	11	10	18	118	30.3	10.2	.8	.8	1.4	9.1
Rik Smits	C	13	13	293	65	9	6	15	153	22.5	5.0	.7	.5	1.2	11.8
Chris Mullin	SF	13	13	283	20	15	10	3	124	21.8	1.5	1.2	.8	.2	9.5
Jalen Rose	SF	13	0	355	31	32	13	5	158	27.3	2.4	2.5	1.0	.4	12.2
Antonio Davis	PF	13	0	326	92	8	5	14	103	25.1	7.1	.6	.4	1.1	7.9
Derrick McKey	SF	13	0	245	43	19	12	4	47	18.8	3.3	1.5	.9	.3	3.6
Sam Perkins	PF	13	0	146	25	6	0	3	53	11.2	1.9	.5	.0	.2	4.1
Travis Best	PG	11	0	150	17	21	4	1	46	13.6	1.5	1.9	.4	.1	4.2
Fred Hoiberg	SG	4	0	20	3	2	3	0	4	5.0	.8	.5	.8	.0	1.0
Austin Croshere	PF	1	0	1	1	0	0	0	2	1.0	1.0	.0	.0	.0	2.0
