= 1998–99 New York Knicks season =

Season of National Basketball Association team the New York Knicks

- Conference champions
- Head coach: Jeff Van Gundy
- General manager: Ernie Grunfeld; Dave Checketts
- Owners: Cablevision
- Arena: Madison Square Garden

Results
- Record: 27–23 (.540)
- Place: Division: 4th (Atlantic); Conference: 8th (Eastern)
- Playoff finish: NBA Finals (lost to Spurs 1–4)
- Stats at Basketball Reference

Local media
- Television: MSG Network (Mike Breen, Walt "Clyde" Frazier)
- Radio: WFAN (Marv Albert, John Andariese)

The 1998–99 New York Knicks season was the 52nd season for the New York Knicks in the National Basketball Association. Due to a lockout, the regular season began on February 5, 1999, and was cut from 82 games to 50.

== Season summary ==
=== Off-season ===
Head coach Jeff Van Gundy entered in his third full season coaching the Knicks. To give All-Star center Patrick Ewing more help offensively and defensively, the Knicks acquired controversial All-Star guard Latrell Sprewell from the Golden State Warriors, acquired Marcus Camby from the Toronto Raptors, and signed free agents Kurt Thomas, and three-point specialist Dennis Scott during the off-season. However, Scott was released by the team to free agency after 15 games, and later on signed with the Minnesota Timberwolves.

=== Regular season ===
With the addition of Sprewell, Camby and Thomas, the Knicks won eight of their first eleven games of the regular season. However, the team dealt with injuries, as Sprewell only played 37 games due to a stress fracture in his right heel, and Ewing only appeared in 38 games due to a knee injury. The Knicks played mediocre basketball around .500 in winning percentage for most of the season, and held a 21–21 record as of April 19, 1999. The Knicks won six of their final eight games of the season to finish in fourth place in the Atlantic Division with a 27–23 record, earning the eighth seed in the Eastern Conference; the team qualified for the NBA playoffs for the twelfth consecutive year.

Ewing averaged 17.3 points, 9.9 rebounds and 2.6 blocks per game, while Sprewell played a sixth man role off the bench, averaging 16.4 points per game, and Allan Houston provided the team with 16.3 points per game. In addition, Larry Johnson contributed 12.0 points and 5.8 rebounds per game, while Thomas provided with 8.1 points and 5.7 rebounds per game, and Charlie Ward contributed 7.6 points, 5.4 assists and 2.1 steals per game. Off the bench, Camby averaged 7.2 points, 5.5 rebounds and 1.6 blocks per game, while Chris Childs contributed 6.8 points and 4.0 assists per game, and Chris Dudley provided with 2.5 points and 4.2 rebounds per game.

Sprewell finished tied in tenth place in Most Improved Player voting; despite a stellar season off the bench, he did not receive any votes in Sixth Man of the Year voting. The Knicks finished third in the NBA in home-game attendance, with an attendance of 494,075 at Madison Square Garden during the regular season.

=== NBA playoffs ===
In the Eastern Conference First Round of the 1999 NBA playoffs, and for the third consecutive year, the Knicks faced off against the top–seeded, and Atlantic Division champion Miami Heat, who were led by All-Star center, and Defensive Player of the Year, Alonzo Mourning, All-Star guard Tim Hardaway, and Jamal Mashburn. The Knicks took a 2–1 series lead before losing Game 4 to the Heat at home, 87–72 at Madison Square Garden. With the series tied at 2–2, the Knicks won Game 5 over the Heat on the road, 78–77 at the Miami Arena, in which Houston hit a memorable game-winning buzzer-beater; the Knicks defeated the Heat in a hard-fought five-game series, and became the second 8th–seeded team in NBA history to defeat the first–seeded team.

In the Eastern Conference Semi-finals, the Knicks faced off against the 4th–seeded Atlanta Hawks, who were led by All-Star center Dikembe Mutombo, All-Star guard Steve Smith and Mookie Blaylock. Despite the Hawks having home-court advantage in the series, the Knicks won the first two games on the road at the Georgia Dome, before winning the next two games at Madison Square Garden, winning Game 4 over the Hawks by a score of 79–66 to complete a four-game sweep of the series, and become the first #8 seed in NBA history to do so. After struggling during most of the regular season, Camby emerged as a key player off a deep Knicks bench, particularly with his 11 points and 13 rebounds in Game 2.

In the Eastern Conference Finals, and for the second consecutive year, the Knicks faced off against the 2nd–seeded, and Central Division champion Indiana Pacers, who were led by All-Star guard Reggie Miller, All-Star center Rik Smits, and sixth man Jalen Rose. The Knicks won Game 1 over the Pacers on the road, 93–90 at the Market Square Arena, but then lost Game 2 to the Pacers, 88–86. In Game 2, the Knicks lost Ewing to injury for the remainder of the playoffs; Ewing had been battling an Achilles tendon injury, and it was learned that the tendon was partially torn, forcing an end to his season. The Knicks were rescued by Johnson in Game 3 at Madison Square Garden; standing outside the three-point line with 11.9 seconds left, Johnson held the ball, and then began to dribble; he leaned into Pacers defender Antonio Davis before jumping up. The referee called the foul about a half-second before Johnson released the ball, but it was counted as a continuation shooting foul; the three-point basket, and the ensuing free throw gave the Knicks a 92–91 victory.

The Pacers evened the series with a 90–78 win in Game 4, but the Knicks won Game 5 at Market Square Arena, 101–94. At home in Game 6, the Knicks won 90–82, despite losing Johnson to a knee injury in the first half. Led by Houston's 32-point performance and defense against Miller, who struggled and only made 3 out of 18 field-goal attempts, the Knicks won the series over the Pacers in six games, and advanced to the NBA Finals for the second time in six seasons. The Knicks' 27–23 record was the worst for a team to reach the NBA Finals, since the Houston Rockets did it with a 40–42 record in 1981. They also became the first #8 seed to reach the Finals, a feat that has since only been repeated once by the Miami Heat in the 2022–23 season.

In the 1999 NBA Finals, the Knicks faced off against the top–seeded San Antonio Spurs, who were led by All-Star forward Tim Duncan, All-Star center David Robinson, and Sean Elliott. The Knicks lost the first two games to the Spurs on the road at the Alamodome, but managed to win Game 3 at home, 89–81 at Madison Square Garden, which featured a 34-point performance from Houston. However, the Knicks lost their next two home games, including a Game 5 loss to the Spurs at Madison Square Garden, 78–77, despite Sprewell's double-double performance of 35 points and 10 rebounds, as Spurs guard Avery Johnson hit the game-winning shot. The Knicks lost the series in five games, as the Spurs won their first ever NBA championship in franchise history.

In the Finals, Sprewell averaged 26.0 points per game, and Houston provided with 21.6 points per game; the Knicks' defense did not allow any opponent to score more than 96 points against them in their 20 playoff games.

=== Aftermath ===
Following the season, veteran center Herb Williams retired at age 41. The Knicks did not return to the NBA Finals again until the 2025–26 season, where they defeated the Spurs in five games in the 2026 NBA Finals.

The team's season roster has been featured in the basketball game series NBA 2K since the 19th installment NBA 2K18.

== Offseason ==
=== NBA draft ===
Round	Pick	Player	Position	Nationality	School/Club team
2	38	DeMarco Johnson	PF	United States	UNC Charlotte
2	44	Sean Marks	PF	New Zealand	California

=== Transactions ===
- On 6/25/98: Knicks traded Charles Oakley and Sean Marks to the Toronto Raptors for Marcus Camby.
- On 1/18/99: Knicks traded John Starks, Chris Mills and Terry Cummings to the Golden State Warriors for Latrell Sprewell.

== Roster ==
1998–99 New York Knicks roster
Players

Pos.	No.	Player	Height	Weight	DOB	From
G	9	Rick Brunson	6 ft 4 in (1.93 m)	190 lb (86 kg)	1972–06–14	Temple
F/C	23	Marcus Camby	6 ft 11 in (2.11 m)	220 lb (100 kg)	1974–03–22	UMass
G	1	Chris Childs	6 ft 3 in (1.91 m)	195 lb (88 kg)	1970–11–20	Boise State
F	4	Ben Davis (injured)	6 ft 9 in (2.06 m)	240 lb (109 kg)	1972–12–26	Arizona
C	14	Chris Dudley	6 ft 11 in (2.11 m)	235 lb (107 kg)	1965–02–22	Yale
C	33	Patrick Ewing	7 ft 0 in (2.13 m)	240 lb (109 kg)	1962–08–05	Georgetown
G	20	Allan Houston	6 ft 6 in (1.98 m)	220 lb (100 kg)	1971–04–20	Tennessee
F	2	Larry Johnson	6 ft 6 in (1.98 m)	250 lb (113 kg)	1969–03–14	UNLV
G/F	8	Latrell Sprewell	6 ft 5 in (1.96 m)	190 lb (86 kg)	1970–09–08	Alabama
F	40	Kurt Thomas	6 ft 9 in (2.06 m)	230 lb (104 kg)	1972–10–04	TCU
G	21	Charlie Ward	6 ft 2 in (1.88 m)	190 lb (86 kg)	1970–10–12	Florida State
F/C	32	Herb Williams	6 ft 10 in (2.08 m)	242 lb (110 kg)	1958–02–16	Ohio State
G/F	25	David Wingate	6 ft 5 in (1.96 m)	190 lb (86 kg)	1963–12–15	Georgetown

Coaches
Head coach
- Jeff Van Gundy
Assistant(s)
- Greg Brittenham
- Don Chaney
- Brendan Malone
- Jeff Nix
- Tom Thibodeau

Legend
- (DP) Unsigned draft pick
- (FA) Free agent
- (S) Suspended
- Injured

Roster

== Regular season ==
=== Season standings ===
Atlantic Division	W	L	PCT	GB	Home	Road	Div	GP
c-Miami Heat	33	17	.660	–	18‍–‍7	15‍–‍10	12–8	50
x-Orlando Magic	33	17	.660	–	21‍–‍4	12‍–‍13	12–6	50
x-Philadelphia 76ers	28	22	.560	5.0	17‍–‍8	11‍–‍14	9–10	50
x-New York Knicks	27	23	.540	6.0	19‍–‍6	8‍–‍17	12–8	50
Boston Celtics	19	31	.380	14.0	10‍–‍15	9‍–‍16	10–9	50
Washington Wizards	18	32	.360	15.0	13‍–‍12	5‍–‍20	6–13	50
New Jersey Nets	16	34	.320	17.0	12‍–‍13	4‍–‍21	6–13	50

Eastern Conference
#	Team	W	L	PCT	GB	GP
1	c-Miami Heat *	33	17	.660	–	50
2	y-Indiana Pacers *	33	17	.660	–	50
3	x-Orlando Magic	33	17	.660	–	50
4	x-Atlanta Hawks	31	19	.620	2.0	50
5	x-Detroit Pistons	29	21	.580	4.0	50
6	x-Philadelphia 76ers	28	22	.560	5.0	50
7	x-Milwaukee Bucks	28	22	.560	5.0	50
8	x-New York Knicks	27	23	.540	6.0	50
9	Charlotte Hornets	26	24	.520	7.0	50
10	Toronto Raptors	23	27	.460	10.0	50
11	Cleveland Cavaliers	22	28	.440	11.0	50
12	Boston Celtics	19	31	.380	14.0	50
13	Washington Wizards	18	32	.360	15.0	50
14	New Jersey Nets	16	34	.320	17.0	50
15	Chicago Bulls	13	37	.260	20.0	50

=== Game log ===
1998–99 game log
Total: 27–23 (home: 19–6; road: 8–17)
February: 8–5 (home: 6–1; road: 2–4)

Game	Date	Team	Score	High points	High rebounds	High assists	Location Attendance	Record
1	February 5	@ Orlando	L 85–93	Latrell Sprewell (24)	Patrick Ewing (9)	Charlie Ward (6)	Orlando Arena; 17,248	0–1
2	February 7	Miami	L 79–83	Patrick Ewing (24)	Patrick Ewing (17)	Charlie Ward (7)	Madison Square Garden; 19,763	0–2
3	February 10	Washington	W 101–88	Larry Johnson (18)	Chris Childs (8)	Chris Childs (9)	Madison Square Garden; 19,763	1–2
4	February 11	@ Chicago	W 73–68	Patrick Ewing (18)	Patrick Ewing (9)	Charlie Ward (6)	United Center; 22,194	2–2
5	February 15	Detroit	W 78–69	Allan Houston (19)	Patrick Ewing (10)	Charlie Ward (9)	Madison Square Garden; 19,763	3–2
6	February 16	Toronto	W 95–85	Allan Houston (20)	Marcus Camby (12)	Ward, Childs (4)	Madison Square Garden; 19,763	4–2
7	February 18	@ Cleveland	L 74–98	Patrick Ewing (14)	Ewing, Scott (6)	Charlie Ward (6)	Gund Arena; 13,910	4–3
8	February 19	@ Philadelphia	W 78–67	Allan Houston (25)	Patrick Ewing (8)	Larry Johnson (7)	First Union Center; 19,681	5–3
9	February 21	Chicago	W 79–63	Allan Houston (26)	Ewing, Camby (6)	Charlie Ward (6)	Madison Square Garden; 19,763	6–3
10	February 23	New Jersey	W 82–74	Patrick Ewing (20)	Ewing, Johnson (11)	Ward, Childs (5)	Madison Square Garden; 19,763	7–3
11	February 25	Minnesota	W 115–113 (OT)	Allan Houston (26)	Patrick Ewing (11)	Charlie Ward (13)	Madison Square Garden; 19,763	8–3
12	February 26	@ Boston	L 80–94	Allan Houston (20)	Patrick Ewing (12)	Charlie Ward (6)	FleetCenter; 18,624	8–4
13	February 28	@ Detroit	L 68–89	Allan Houston (13)	Patrick Ewing (8)	Chris Childs (6)	The Palace of Auburn Hills; 20,896	8–5

March: 9–9 (home: 7–3; road: 2–6)

Game	Date	Team	Score	High points	High rebounds	High assists	Location Attendance	Record
14	March 1	Cleveland	W 85–78	Ewing, Johnson (16)	Ewing, Scott (12)	Charlie Ward (9)	Madison Square Garden; 19,763	9–5
15	March 2	@ Miami	L 84–85 (OT)	Patrick Ewing (31)	Patrick Ewing (16)	Charlie Ward (6)	Miami Arena; 15,200	9–6
16	March 5	@ Milwaukee	L 87–88	Patrick Ewing (24)	Patrick Ewing (13)	Chris Childs (4)	Bradley Center; 16,843	9–7
17	March 7	New Jersey	W 97–86	Patrick Ewing (30)	Patrick Ewing (9)	three players tied (5)	Madison Square Garden; 19,763	10–7
18	March 9	Milwaukee	L 86–87	Larry Johnson (19)	Johnson, Thomas (7)	Allan Houston (5)	Madison Square Garden; 19,763	10–8
19	March 11	Washington	W 98–86	Allan Houston (19)	Marcus Camby (12)	Charlie Ward (8)	Madison Square Garden; 19,763	11–8
20	March 12	@ Chicago	L 63–76	Allan Houston (16)	Marcus Camby (9)	Houston, Brunson (3)	United Center; 23,079	11–9
21	March 14	Charlotte	W 94–86	Allan Houston (20)	Chris Dudley (13)	Sprewell, Childs (4)	Madison Square Garden; 19,763	12–9
22	March 15	@ Milwaukee	W 108–102	Latrell Sprewell (28)	Chris Dudley (11)	Charlie Ward (7)	Bradley Center; 14,738	13–9
23	March 16	L.A. Clippers	W 113–89	Latrell Sprewell (31)	Kurt Thomas (12)	Charlie Ward (9)	Madison Square Garden; 19,763	14–9
24	March 18	Orlando	L 78–86	Allan Houston (18)	Chris Dudley (10)	Johnson, Ward (5)	Madison Square Garden; 19,763	14–10
25	March 20	Boston	W 96–78	Latrell Sprewell (27)	Marcus Camby (15)	Chris Childs (7)	Madison Square Garden; 19,763	15–10
26	March 21	@ Toronto	L 81–85 (OT)	Patrick Ewing (21)	Patrick Ewing (15)	Charlie Ward (6)	Air Canada Centre; 19,266	15–11
27	March 22	Atlanta	L 71–80	Patrick Ewing (23)	Larry Johnson (10)	Charlie Ward (5)	Madison Square Garden; 19,763	15–12
28	March 24	@ Sacramento	L 91–92	Patrick Ewing (23)	Patrick Ewing (14)	Charlie Ward (6)	ARCO Arena; 17,023	15–13
29	March 26	@ Phoenix	W 94–87	Allan Houston (29)	Marcus Camby (10)	Charlie Ward (5)	America West Arena; 19,023	16–13
30	March 28	@ L.A. Lakers	L 91–99	Latrell Sprewell (25)	Patrick Ewing (13)	Chris Childs (6)	Great Western Forum; 17,505	16–14
31	March 30	Indiana	W 94–93	Patrick Ewing (37)	Patrick Ewing (15)	Charlie Ward (7)	Madison Square Garden; 19,763	17–14

April: 8–8 (home: 4–2; road: 4–6)

Game	Date	Team	Score	High points	High rebounds	High assists	Location Attendance	Record
32	April 1	Cleveland	W 78–74	Allan Houston (16)	Patrick Ewing (11)	Charlie Ward (7)	Madison Square Garden; 19,763	18–14
33	April 4	@ Indiana	L 95–108	Latrell Sprewell (20)	Patrick Ewing (14)	Chris Childs (5)	Market Square Arena; 16,731	18–15
34	April 6	Orlando	L 72–81	Patrick Ewing (28)	Patrick Ewing (15)	Charlie Ward (7)	Madison Square Garden; 19,763	18–16
35	April 7	@ Charlotte	L 82–106	Thomas, Ewing (17)	Kurt Thomas (9)	Chris Childs (8)	Charlotte Coliseum; 19,810	18–17
36	April 9	@ Atlanta	W 86–78	Patrick Ewing (16)	Johnson, Ewing (8)	Chris Childs (5)	Georgia Dome; 21,673	19–17
37	April 11	@ New Jersey	W 93–78	Larry Johnson (22)	Patrick Ewing (15)	Chris Childs (6)	Continental Airlines Arena; 20,049	20–17
38	April 13	Philadelphia	W 91–72	Kurt Thomas (18)	Chris Dudley (7)	Charlie Ward (5)	Madison Square Garden; 19,763	21–17
39	April 14	@ Washington	L 89–95 (OT)	Marcus Camby (18)	Marcus Camby (13)	Chris Childs (10)	MCI Center; 17,428	21–18
40	April 16	@ Detroit	L 71–80	Allan Houston (23)	Kurt Thomas (11)	Charlie Ward (6)	The Palace of Auburn Hills; 22,076	21–19
41	April 17	Toronto	L 90–93	Latrell Sprewell (22)	Patrick Ewing (9)	Charlie Ward (6)	Madison Square Garden; 19,763	21–20
42	April 19	@ Philadelphia	L 67–72	Latrell Sprewell (16)	Patrick Ewing (9)	Larry Johnson (5)	First Union Center; 18,049	21–21
43	April 23	Charlotte	W 110–105	Allan Houston (30)	Marcus Camby (11)	Latrell Sprewell (8)	Madison Square Garden; 19,763	22–21
44	April 25	@ Miami	W 82–80	Larry Johnson (23)	Kurt Thomas (10)	Ward, Childs (6)	Miami Arena; 15,200	23–21
45	April 26	@ Charlotte	W 91–84	Latrell Sprewell (21)	Chris Dudley (12)	Chris Childs (6)	Charlotte Coliseum; 19,782	24–21
46	April 28	@ Atlanta	L 73–76	Latrell Sprewell (29)	Kurt Thomas (11)	Chris Childs (5)	Georgia Dome; 13,474	24–22
47	April 29	Philadelphia	W 85–70	Latrell Sprewell (30)	Larry Johnson (10)	Charlie Ward (6)	Madison Square Garden; 19,763	25–22

May: 2–1 (home: 2–0; road: 0–1)

Game	Date	Team	Score	High points	High rebounds	High assists	Location Attendance	Record
48	May 2	@ Indiana	L 71–94	Patrick Ewing (15)	Patrick Ewing (8)	Charlie Ward (4)	Market Square Arena; 16,730	25–23
49	May 3	Boston	W 95–88	Patrick Ewing (27)	Patrick Ewing (19)	Charlie Ward (10)	Madison Square Garden; 19,763	26–23
50	May 5	Miami	W 101–88	Marcus Camby (22)	Chris Dudley (11)	Rick Brunson (12)	Madison Square Garden; 19,763	27–23

1998–99 schedule

== Playoffs ==
1999 playoff game log
First Round: 3–2 (home: 1–1; road: 2–1)

Game	Date	Team	Score	High points	High rebounds	High assists	Location Attendance	Series
1	May 8	@ Miami	W 95–75	Houston, Sprewell (22)	Patrick Ewing (15)	Charlie Ward (6)	Miami Arena; 15,036	1–0
2	May 10	@ Miami	L 73–83	Patrick Ewing (16)	Patrick Ewing (15)	Charlie Ward (5)	Miami Arena; 15,200	1–1
3	May 12	Miami	W 97–73	Latrell Sprewell (20)	Marcus Camby (9)	Charlie Ward (4)	Madison Square Garden; 19,763	2–1
4	May 14	Miami	L 72–87	Houston, Ward (12)	Larry Johnson (12)	Charlie Ward (4)	Madison Square Garden; 19,763	2–2
5	May 16	@ Miami	W 78–77	Patrick Ewing (22)	Patrick Ewing (11)	three players tied (3)	Miami Arena; 14,985	3–2

Conference semifinals: 4–0 (home: 2–0; road: 2–0)

Game	Date	Team	Score	High points	High rebounds	High assists	Location Attendance	Series
1	May 18	@ Atlanta	W 100–92	Allan Houston (34)	Chris Dudley (9)	Charlie Ward (7)	Georgia Dome; 18,513	1–0
2	May 20	@ Atlanta	W 77–70	Latrell Sprewell (31)	Marcus Camby (13)	Chris Childs (5)	Georgia Dome; 22,558	2–0
3	May 23	Atlanta	W 90–78	Houston, Sprewell (17)	Chris Dudley (12)	Chris Childs (6)	Madison Square Garden; 19,763	3–0
4	May 24	Atlanta	W 79–66	Allan Houston (19)	Patrick Ewing (9)	Charlie Ward (6)	Madison Square Garden; 19,763	4–0

Conference finals: 4–2 (home: 2–1; road: 2–1)

Game	Date	Team	Score	High points	High rebounds	High assists	Location Attendance	Series
1	May 30	@ Indiana	W 93–90	Allan Houston (19)	Patrick Ewing (10)	Childs, Ward (5)	Market Square Arena; 16,575	1–0
2	June 1	@ Indiana	L 86–88	Larry Johnson (22)	Marcus Camby (13)	three players tied (3)	Market Square Arena; 16,586	1–1
3	June 5	Indiana	W 92–91	Larry Johnson (26)	Marcus Camby (11)	Chris Childs (10)	Madison Square Garden; 19,763	2–1
4	June 7	Indiana	L 78–90	Marcus Camby (18)	Marcus Camby (14)	Chris Childs (8)	Madison Square Garden; 19,763	2–2
5	June 9	@ Indiana	W 101–94	Latrell Sprewell (29)	Marcus Camby (13)	Chris Childs (7)	Market Square Arena; 16,541	3–2
6	June 11	Indiana	W 90–82	Allan Houston (32)	Marcus Camby (9)	Chris Childs (4)	Madison Square Garden; 19,763	4–2

NBA Finals: 1–4 (home: 1–2; road: 0–2)

Game	Date	Team	Score	High points	High rebounds	High assists	Location Attendance	Series
1	June 16	@ San Antonio	L 77–89	Houston, Sprewell (19)	Kurt Thomas (16)	three players tied (3)	Alamodome; 39,514	0–1
2	June 18	@ San Antonio	L 67–80	Latrell Sprewell (26)	Marcus Camby (11)	Charlie Ward (3)	Alamodome; 39,554	0–2
3	June 21	San Antonio	W 89–81	Allan Houston (34)	Kurt Thomas (10)	Latrell Sprewell (5)	Madison Square Garden; 19,763	1–2
4	June 23	San Antonio	L 89–96	Latrell Sprewell (26)	Marcus Camby (13)	Charlie Ward (8)	Madison Square Garden; 19,763	1–3
5	June 25	San Antonio	L 77–78	Latrell Sprewell (35)	Latrell Sprewell (10)	Allan Houston (5)	Madison Square Garden; 19,763	1–4

1999 schedule

== Player statistics ==
Legend
GP	Games played	GS	Games started	MPG	Minutes per game
FG%	Field-goal percentage	3P%	3-point field-goal percentage	FT%	Free-throw percentage
RPG	Rebounds per game	APG	Assists per game	SPG	Steals per game
BPG	Blocks per game	PPG	Points per game

=== Season ===
Player	GP	GS	MPG	FG%	3P%	FT%	RPG	APG	SPG	BPG	PPG
Rick Brunson	17	0	5.6	.286	.000	.278	0.6	1.1	0.5	.	1.0
Marcus Camby	46	0	20.5	.521	.	.553	5.5	0.3	0.6	1.6	7.2
Chris Childs	48	0	27.0	.427	.383	.821	2.8	4.0	0.9	.	6.8
Ben Davis	8	0	2.6	.412	.	.500	1.4	0.4	.	.	2.2
Chris Dudley	46	16	14.9	.440	.	.475	4.2	0.2	0.3	0.8	2.5
Patrick Ewing	38	38	34.2	.435	.000	.706	9.9	1.1	0.8	2.6	17.3
Allan Houston	50	50	36.3	.418	.407	.862	3.0	2.7	0.7	0.2	16.3
Larry Johnson	49	48	33.4	.459	.359	.817	5.8	2.4	0.7	0.2	12.0
Dennis Scott	15	0	13.7	.304	.276	.250	1.3	0.5	0.2	0.1	2.9
Latrell Sprewell	37	4	33.3	.415	.273	.812	4.2	2.5	1.2	0.1	16.4
Kurt Thomas	50	44	23.6	.462	.000	.611	5.7	1.1	0.9	0.3	8.1
Charlie Ward	50	50	31.1	.404	.356	.705	3.4	5.4	2.1	0.2	7.6
Herb Williams	6	0	5.7	.500	.	1.000	1.0	.	.	0.3	1.7
David Wingate	20	0	4.6	.438	.	.	0.4	0.3	0.2	.	0.7

=== Playoffs ===
Player	GP	GS	MPG	FG%	3P%	FT%	RPG	APG	SPG	BPG	PPG
Rick Brunson	9	0	2.0	.400	.	1.000	0.1	0.2	.	.	0.7
Marcus Camby	20	3	25.5	.566	.000	.616	7.7	0.3	1.2	1.9	10.4
Chris Childs	20	0	24.7	.355	.321	.731	2.4	3.7	0.7	0.1	4.7
Chris Dudley	18	6	16.3	.421	.	.393	4.6	0.3	0.5	0.4	2.4
Patrick Ewing	11	11	31.5	.430	.	.778	8.7	0.5	0.6	0.7	13.1
Allan Houston	20	20	39.2	.443	.250	.883	2.7	2.6	0.4	0.1	18.5
Larry Johnson	20	20	34.2	.426	.293	.674	4.9	1.6	1.1	0.1	11.5
Latrell Sprewell	20	8	37.2	.419	.160	.850	4.8	2.2	1.0	0.3	20.4
Kurt Thomas	20	12	21.0	.381	.	.696	5.5	0.4	0.8	0.6	5.3
Charlie Ward	20	20	24.7	.366	.321	.750	2.3	3.8	1.8	0.2	4.6
Herb Williams	8	0	2.0	.200	.	.	0.4	.	.	.	0.3

Player statistics citation:

== See also ==
- 1998–99 NBA season
- 1999 NBA Finals
- 1999 NBA Playoffs
