= Ervin Johnson =

American basketball player and coach (born 1967)

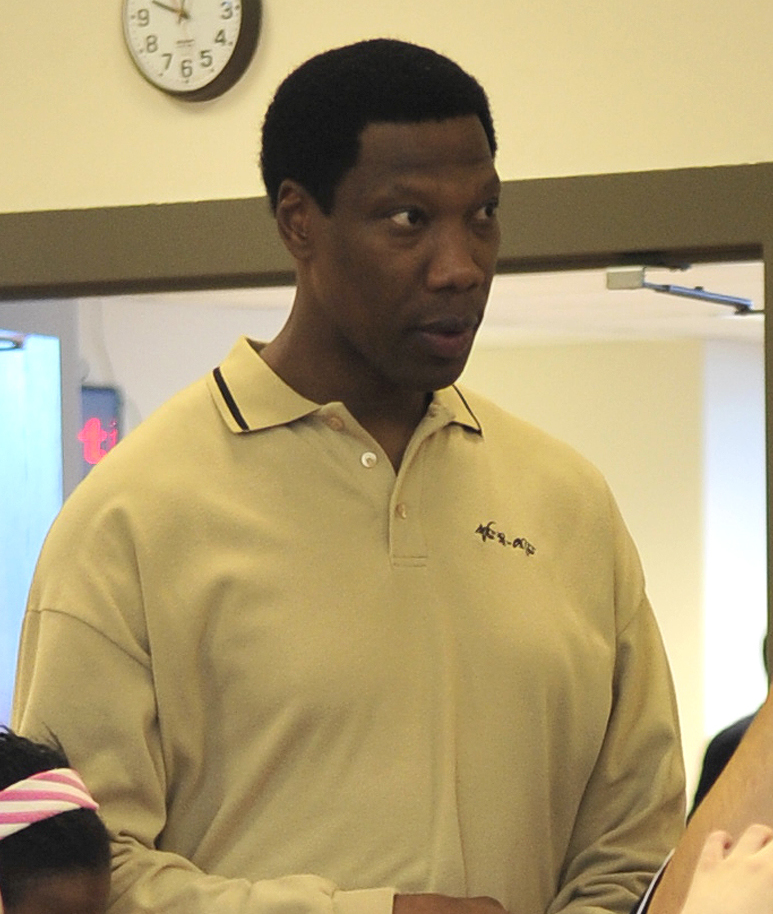
- Johnson in 2010

LSU New Orleans Privateers
- Title: Assistant coach
- Conference: Southland Conference

Personal information
- Born: December 21, 1967 (age 58) New Orleans, Louisiana, U.S.
- Listed height: 6 ft 11 in (2.11 m)
- Listed weight: 245 lb (111 kg)

Career information
- High school: Block (Jonesville, Louisiana)
- College: New Orleans (1989–1993)
- NBA draft: 1993: 1st round, 23rd overall pick
- Drafted by: Seattle SuperSonics
- Playing career: 1993–2006
- Position: Center
- Number: 50, 40
- Coaching career: 2026–present

Career history

Playing
- 1993–1996: Seattle SuperSonics
- 1996–1997: Denver Nuggets
- 1997–2003: Milwaukee Bucks
- 2003–2005: Minnesota Timberwolves
- 2005–2006: Milwaukee Bucks

Coaching
- 2026–present: LSU New Orleans (assistant)

Career highlights
- Third-team All-American – UPI (1993); Sun Belt Player of the Year (1993); 2× First-team All-Sun Belt (1992, 1993); No. 40 retired by New Orleans Privateers

Career NBA statistics
- Points: 3,473 (4.1 ppg)
- Rebounds: 5,148 (6.1 rpg)
- Blocks: 1,087 (1.3 bpg)
- Stats at NBA.com
- Stats at Basketball Reference
Medals
Men's basketball
Representing United States
Summer Universiade
| Gold medal – first place | 1991 Sheffield | National team |

Ervin Johnson Jr. (born December 21, 1967) is an American basketball coach and former player who is an assistant coach for his alma mater, the LSU New Orleans Privateers of the Southland Conference. He previously played in the NBA for the Seattle SuperSonics, Denver Nuggets, Milwaukee Bucks and Minnesota Timberwolves as a center from 1993 to 2006.

== Early life ==
Johnson attended Block High School in Jonesville, Louisiana, where he played basketball until he quit in the 10th grade. Three years after high school, he worked at a Baton Rouge supermarket and grew 8 inches. A friend suggested that he try out for the New Orleans Privateers, which did not have a big man. Privateers head coach Tim Floyd offered Johnson a scholarship on sight despite Johnson not having played basketball in years.

== College career ==
UNO recorded 87 victories during Johnson's time in the program. They earned two NCAA tournament bids and one NIT tournament appearance. When he finished, he was the second all-time leading scorer in UNO history (1,608 points), first all-time in field goal percentage (59%), first all-time in double-doubles with 55, first all-time in rebounds with 1,287 (10.5 per game), third all-time in double-figure scoring games (81), eighth all-time in steals (109), second all-time in games played (123) and first all-time in blocks (294). Johnson was named All-American South Conference for the 1990–1991 season, All-Sun Belt Conference for the 1991–1992 season, and the 1992–1993 Sun Belt Conference Player of the Year.

Johnson completed his degree in general studies from the University of New Orleans during the 1996–97 NBA season, and was commencement speaker at graduation ceremonies.

=== Honors ===
Johnson was named Basketball Times 2nd Team All-American for 1992–93 and 3rd Team All-American by Basketball Weekly and United Press International. He was named Honorable Mention All-American for the same season by the Associated Press.

Johnson was named MVP of the NABC All-America Game in 1993.

On December 29, 1997, his Privateer jersey (40) was retired at Lakefront Arena.

In 2005, Johnson was named to the All-Time Men's Basketball Team for the Sun Belt Conference in celebration of the conference's 30th basketball season.

== Professional career ==
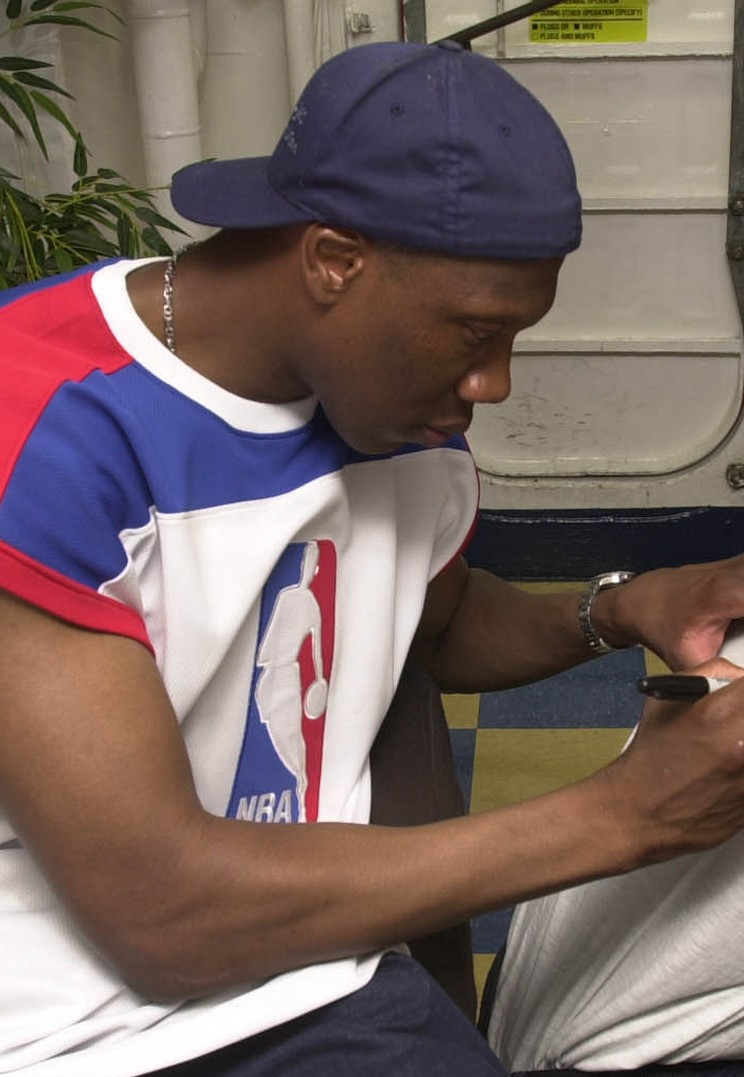
Johnson signing an autograph in 2003

Johnson was selected 23rd overall by the Seattle SuperSonics in the 1993 NBA draft, and played for the Sonics, Denver Nuggets, Minnesota Timberwolves and Milwaukee Bucks.

On February 14, 1996, Johnson scored a career-high 28 points, alongside grabbing 12 rebounds, in a win against the Timberwolves. Johnson and the Sonics would make it to the Finals that postseason, before losing to the Bulls.

The following season, after signing with the Nuggets, Johnson scored 19 points, grabbed 20 rebounds and blocked 5 shots on December 20 in a win against the Vancouver Grizzlies. That year, Johnson led the league in total defensive rebounds, with 682.

During the 1997 offseason, Johnson was traded to the Bucks for Danny Fortson, Johnny Newman, and Joe Wolf. On April 11, 1998, Johnson scored 24 points and grabbed 15 rebounds in a loss against the New Jersey Nets.

Johnson played a key role on the 2000–01 Bucks, grabbing a playoff career-high 17 rebounds on May 15 against the Charlotte Hornets, and playing in every game of their playoff run leading up to their Game 7 loss (in which he started and played 42 minutes) in the Eastern Conference Finals against the 76ers.

Three years later, now in Minnesota and 36 years old, Johnson played an important role on another team's deep playoff run. This time, he averaged 20 minutes a game in the playoffs, but still started most games en route to a Western Conference Finals loss to the Lakers.

Johnson returned to the Bucks for one season, and retired after the end of the 2006 NBA playoffs.

== NBA career statistics ==
Legend
| GP | Games played | GS | Games started | MPG | Minutes per game |
| FG% | Field goal percentage | 3P% | 3-point field goal percentage | FT% | Free throw percentage |
| RPG | Rebounds per game | APG | Assists per game | SPG | Steals per game |
| BPG | Blocks per game | PPG | Points per game | **Bold** | Career high |

| * | Led the league |

=== Regular season ===
| Year | Team | GP | GS | MPG | FG% | 3P% | FT% | RPG | APG | SPG | BPG | PPG |
|---|---|---|---|---|---|---|---|---|---|---|---|---|
| 1993–94 | Seattle | 45 | 3 | 6.2 | .415 | – | .630 | 2.6 | .2 | .2 | .5 | 2.6 |
| 1994–95 | Seattle | 64 | 30 | 14.2 | .443 | .000 | .630 | 4.5 | .3 | .3 | 1.0 | 3.1 |
| 1995–96 | Seattle | 81 | 60 | 18.8 | .511 | .333 | .669 | 5.3 | .6 | .5 | 1.6 | 5.5 |
| 1996–97 | Denver | **82** | **82*** | **31.7** | .520 | .000 | .615 | **11.1** | **.9** | .8 | **2.8** | 7.1 |
| 1997–98 | Milwaukee | 81 | 81 | 27.9 | .537 | – | .601 | 8.5 | .7 | **1.0** | 2.0 | **8.0** |
| 1998–99 | Milwaukee | 50* | 7 | 20.5 | .508 | – | .610 | 6.4 | .4 | .6 | 1.1 | 5.1 |
| 1999–2000 | Milwaukee | 80 | 74 | 26.6 | .516 | .000 | .605 | 8.1 | .6 | **1.0** | 1.6 | 4.8 |
| 2000–01 | Milwaukee | **82** | 19 | 24.2 | **.545** | – | .538 | 7.5 | .5 | .5 | 1.2 | 3.2 |
| 2001–02 | Milwaukee | 81 | 9 | 20.5 | .461 | .000 | .455 | 5.8 | .3 | .5 | 1.0 | 2.6 |
| 2002–03 | Milwaukee | 69 | 17 | 17.0 | .452 | – | **.682** | 4.3 | .3 | .5 | .9 | 2.2 |
| 2003–04 | Minnesota | 66 | 47 | 14.7 | .534 | .000 | .607 | 3.5 | .4 | .4 | .7 | 1.9 |
| 2004–05 | Minnesota | 46 | 23 | 8.9 | .519 | **1.000** | .640 | 2.5 | .1 | .2 | .3 | 1.6 |
| 2005–06 | Milwaukee | 18 | 0 | 4.5 | .412 | – | .500 | 1.3 | .1 | .1 | .1 | .8 |
| Career | | 845 | 452 | 20.1 | .505 | .200 | .605 | 6.1 | .5 | .6 | 1.3 | 4.1 |

=== Playoffs ===
| Year | Team | GP | GS | MPG | FG% | 3P% | FT% | RPG | APG | SPG | BPG | PPG |
|---|---|---|---|---|---|---|---|---|---|---|---|---|
| 1994 | Seattle | 2 | 0 | 4.0 | .000 | – | – | 2.0 | .0 | .0 | .0 | .0 |
| 1995 | Seattle | 4 | 2 | 13.5 | .286 | – | **1.000** | 5.3 | .0 | .3 | 1.0 | 3.5 |
| 1996 | Seattle | **18** | **18** | 14.1 | .371 | – | .818 | 3.9 | .4 | .3 | .8 | 3.1 |
| 1999 | Milwaukee | 3 | 2 | 30.7 | .462 | – | .500 | 6.0 | .3 | .7 | 1.7 | 4.3 |
| 2000 | Milwaukee | 5 | 5 | 31.0 | .500 | – | .611 | 9.8 | .4 | **1.2** | 1.2 | **6.2** |
| 2001 | Milwaukee | **18** | 10 | **32.1** | **.574** | – | .625 | **10.8** | .6 | .5 | **2.1** | 5.4 |
| 2003 | Milwaukee | 6 | 3 | 12.7 | .375 | – | – | 4.0 | .5 | .5 | .8 | 1.0 |
| 2004 | Minnesota | **18** | 16 | 19.8 | .500 | – | .625 | 4.7 | **.7** | .6 | .6 | 2.7 |
| 2006 | Milwaukee | 3 | 0 | 3.7 | .000 | – | **1.000** | 1.3 | .0 | .3 | .0 | .7 |
| Career | | 77 | 56 | 20.5 | .462 | – | .678 | 6.1 | .5 | .5 | 1.1 | 3.5 |

== Post-playing career ==
Johnson was a community ambassador for the Denver Nuggets. In that role, he hosted clinics to teach basketball fundamentals to children in Colorado.

=== Coaching career ===
In August 2026, Johnson was hired as an assistant coach for the LSU New Orleans Privateers, his alma mater.
