= 2000–01 Boston Celtics season =

Season of National Basketball Association team the Boston Celtics

- Head coach: Rick Pitino; Jim O'Brien (interim)
- General manager: Rick Pitino
- Owner: Paul Gaston
- Arena: Fleet Center

Results
- Record: 36–46 (.439)
- Place: Division: 5th (Atlantic); Conference: 9th (Eastern)
- Playoff finish: Did not qualify
- Stats at Basketball Reference

Local media
- Television: Fox Sports Net New England
- Radio: WEEI

The 2000–01 Boston Celtics season was the 55th season for the Boston Celtics in the National Basketball Association.

== Season summary ==
=== Off-season ===
The Celtics received the eleventh overall pick in the 2000 NBA draft, and selected power forward Jérôme Moïso from the University of California, Los Angeles. During the off-season, the team acquired Bryant Stith, and second-year guard Chris Herren from the Denver Nuggets, and signed free agents Randy Brown, Chris Carr, second-year guard Milt Palacio, and rookie center Mark Blount.

=== Regular season ===
With the addition of Stith, the Celtics played around .500 in winning percentage in November, but then struggled as Kenny Anderson only played just 33 games due to an ankle injury and broken jaw, and Tony Battie only played just 40 games due to an ankle injury. With a 12–22 start to the regular season, a frustrated Rick Pitino resigned as head coach after three years with the Celtics. Under replacement Jim O'Brien, the team played around .500 basketball for the remainder of the season, posting a six-game winning streak between January and February, and holding a 22–27 record at the All-Star break. However, the Celtics lost six of their final eight games of the season, finishing in fifth place in the Atlantic Division with a 36–46 record, and missing the NBA playoffs for the sixth consecutive year; in the 39 years before the current streak, they had missed the playoffs only five times.

Paul Pierce averaged 25.3 points, 6.4 rebounds and 1.7 steals per game, and contributed 147 three-point field goals, while Antoine Walker averaged 23.4 points, 8.9 rebounds, 5.5 assists and 1.7 steals per game, and led the league with 221 three-point field goals. In addition, Stith contributed 9.7 points per game, while Anderson provided the team with 7.5 points, 4.1 assists and 1.3 steals per game, Vitaly Potapenko averaged 7.5 points and 6.0 rebounds per game, and Eric Williams contributed 6.6 points per game. Meanwhile, Battie provided with 6.5 points, 5.8 rebounds and 1.5 blocks per game, Palacio averaged 5.9 points and 2.6 assists per game, Brown contributed 4.1 points and 2.9 assists per game, and Blount averaged 3.9 points and 3.6 rebounds per game.

Pierce finished in 13th place in Most Valuable Player voting. The Celtics finished 19th in the NBA in home-game attendance, with an attendance of 629,201 at the FleetCenter during the regular season.

=== Notable incidents ===
Prior to the regular season, the Celtics were nearly hit with tragedy when Pierce was stabbed eleven times in the face, neck and back, and had a bottle smashed over his head, and was attacked by three men at the Buzz Club, a late night dance club in the Boston Theater District on September 25, 2000. Battie and his brother both saved Pierce by rushing him to a nearby hospital, where he had to undergo lung surgery to repair the damage. Nevertheless, Pierce was the only Celtic to start all 82 games during the 2000–01 season.

=== Aftermath ===
Following the season, Stith signed as a free agent with the Cleveland Cavaliers, while second-year guard Adrian Griffin signed with the Dallas Mavericks, and Carr was released to free agency.

== Draft picks ==
Round	Pick	Player	Position	Nationality	College
1	11	Jérôme Moïso	PF	France	UCLA

== Roster ==
2000–01 Boston Celtics roster
Players

Pos.	No.	Player	Height	Weight	DOB	From
G	7	Kenny Anderson	6 ft 0 in (1.83 m)	168 lb (76 kg)	1970–10–09	Georgia Tech
C	4	Tony Battie	6 ft 11 in (2.11 m)	230 lb (104 kg)	1976–02–11	Texas Tech
C	30	Mark Blount	7 ft 0 in (2.13 m)	230 lb (104 kg)	1975–11–30	Pittsburgh
G	11	Randy Brown	6 ft 2 in (1.88 m)	190 lb (86 kg)	1968–05–22	New Mexico State
G	43	Chris Carr	6 ft 5 in (1.96 m)	207 lb (94 kg)	1974–03–12	Southern Illinois
G	44	Adrian Griffin	6 ft 5 in (1.96 m)	217 lb (98 kg)	1974–07–04	Seton Hall
G	12	Chris Herren	6 ft 2 in (1.88 m)	195 lb (88 kg)	1975–09–27	Fresno State
F/C	0	Walter McCarty	6 ft 10 in (2.08 m)	230 lb (104 kg)	1974–02–01	Kentucky
C	5	Jerome Moiso	6 ft 10 in (2.08 m)	240 lb (109 kg)	1978–06–15	UCLA
G	9	Milt Palacio	6 ft 3 in (1.91 m)	195 lb (88 kg)	1978–02–07	Colorado State
F	34	Paul Pierce	6 ft 6 in (1.98 m)	230 lb (104 kg)	1977–10–13	Kansas
C	52	Vitaly Potapenko	6 ft 10 in (2.08 m)	280 lb (127 kg)	1975–03–21	Wright State
G	20	Bryant Stith	6 ft 5 in (1.96 m)	208 lb (94 kg)	1970–12–10	Virginia
F	8	Antoine Walker	6 ft 8 in (2.03 m)	224 lb (102 kg)	1976–08–12	Kentucky
F	55	Eric Williams	6 ft 8 in (2.03 m)	220 lb (100 kg)	1972–07–17	Providence

Coaches
Head coach
- Rick Pitino
- Jim O’Brien (interim)
Assistant(s)
- John Carroll
- Lester Conner
- Jim O'Brien

Legend
- (DP) Unsigned draft pick
- (FA) Free agent
- (S) Suspended
- Injured

Roster
Updated: January 10, 2001

== Regular season ==
=== Season standings ===
Atlantic Division	W	L	PCT	GB	Home	Road	Div
y-Philadelphia 76ers	56	26	.683	–	29–12	27–14	18–6
x-Miami Heat	50	32	.610	6	29–12	21–20	15–10
x-New York Knicks	48	34	.585	8	30–11	18–23	16–9
x-Orlando Magic	43	39	.524	13	26–15	17–24	14–10
e-Boston Celtics	36	46	.439	20	20–21	16–25	11–13
e-New Jersey Nets	26	56	.317	30	18–23	8–33	8–16
e-Washington Wizards	19	63	.232	37	12–29	7–34	3–21

Eastern Conference
#	Team	W	L	PCT	GB
1	c-Philadelphia 76ers	56	26	.683	–
2	y-Milwaukee Bucks	52	30	.634	4
3	x-Miami Heat	50	32	.610	6
4	x-New York Knicks	48	34	.585	8
5	x-Toronto Raptors	47	35	.573	9
6	x-Charlotte Hornets	46	36	.561	10
7	x-Orlando Magic	43	39	.524	13
8	x-Indiana Pacers	41	41	.500	15
9	e-Boston Celtics	36	46	.439	20
10	e-Detroit Pistons	32	50	.390	24
11	e-Cleveland Cavaliers	30	52	.366	26
12	e-New Jersey Nets	26	56	.317	30
13	e-Atlanta Hawks	25	57	.305	31
14	e-Washington Wizards	19	63	.232	37
15	e-Chicago Bulls	15	67	.183	42

== Player statistics ==
Legend
GP	Games played	GS	Games started	MPG	Minutes per game
FG%	Field-goal percentage	3P%	3-point field-goal percentage	FT%	Free-throw percentage
RPG	Rebounds per game	APG	Assists per game	SPG	Steals per game
BPG	Blocks per game	PPG	Points per game

=== Regular season ===
Boston Celtics statistics
Player	GP	GS	MPG	FG%	3P%	FT%	RPG	APG	SPG	BPG	PPG
Kenny Anderson	33	28	25.7	.388	.333	.831	2.2	4.1	1.3	.1	7.5
Tony Battie	40	25	21.1	.537	.000	.638	5.8	.4	.7	1.5	6.5
Mark Blount	64	50	17.2	.505		.697	3.6	.5	.6	1.2	3.9
Randy Brown	54	35	22.9	.422	.000	.575	1.8	2.9	1.1	.2	4.1
Rick Brunson^{†}	7	0	20.3	.286	.182	.444	1.3	3.4	1.0	.1	3.7
Chris Carr	35	0	8.8	.473	.459	.767	1.3	.3	.1	.1	4.8
Adrian Griffin	44	0	8.6	.340	.346	.750	2.0	.6	.4	.1	2.1
Chris Herren	25	7	16.3	.302	.291	.750	.8	2.2	.6	.0	3.3
Walter McCarty	60	3	8.0	.357	.339	.786	1.4	.7	.2	.1	2.2
Jérôme Moïso	24	0	5.6	.400	.000	.423	1.8	.1	.1	.2	1.5
Doug Overton^{†}	7	1	20.6	.341	.250	.636	2.1	2.7	.6	.0	5.4
Milt Palacio	58	6	19.7	.472	.333	.848	1.8	2.6	.8	.0	5.9
Paul Pierce	82	82	38.0	.454	.383	.745	6.4	3.1	1.7	.8	25.3
Vitaly Potapenko	82	7	23.2	.476		.728	6.0	.8	.6	.3	7.5
Bryant Stith	78	74	32.1	.401	.376	.845	3.6	2.2	1.2	.2	9.7
Antoine Walker	81	81	41.9	.413	.367	.716	8.9	5.5	1.7	.6	23.4
Eric Williams	81	11	21.5	.362	.331	.714	2.6	1.4	.8	.2	6.6

- ^{†} Denotes player spent time with another team in the season. Stats reflect time with the Celtics only.

Player statistics citation:

== See also ==
- 2000–01 NBA season
- Reebok Pro Summer League, a summer league hosted by the Celtics
