= Scott Williams (basketball) =

American basketball player (born 1968)

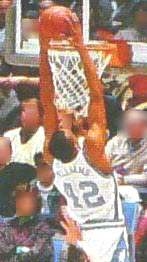
- Williams playing for North Carolina during the 1986–87 season

Personal information
- Born: March 21, 1968 (age 58) Hacienda Heights, California, U.S.
- Listed height: 6 ft 10 in (2.08 m)
- Listed weight: 230 lb (104 kg)

Career information
- High school: Glen A. Wilson (Hacienda Heights, California)
- College: North Carolina (1986–1990)
- NBA draft: 1990: undrafted
- Playing career: 1990–2005
- Position: Power forward / center
- Number: 42, 55, 47

Career history

Playing
- 1990–1994: Chicago Bulls
- 1994–1999: Philadelphia 76ers
- 1999–2001: Milwaukee Bucks
- 2001–2002: Denver Nuggets
- 2002–2004: Phoenix Suns
- 2004: Dallas Mavericks
- 2004–2005: Cleveland Cavaliers

Coaching
- 2012–2013: Idaho Stampede (assistant)
- 2013–2014: Milwaukee Bucks (assistant)

Career highlights
- 3× NBA champion (1991–1993); McDonald's All-American (1986); Second-team Parade All-American (1986); California Mr. Basketball (1986)

Career statistics
- Points: 3,825 (5.1 ppg)
- Rebounds: 3,506 (4.7 rpg)
- Blocks: 421 (0.6 bpg)
- Stats at NBA.com
- Stats at Basketball Reference
Medals
Men's basketball
Representing United States
FIBA U19 World Championship
Silver medal – second place	1987 Bormio	Team competition

Scott Christopher Williams (born March 21, 1968) is an American former professional basketball player in the National Basketball Association (NBA). Standing at 6' 10", he was capable of playing as a power forward or a center. Early in his professional career, Williams earned three NBA Finals rings as he contributed off the bench during the Chicago Bulls' first three-peat championships from 1991 to 1993. He developed into a front-court reserve during his fifteen seasons in the NBA, where he was known for his hustle and strong defense. Since his retirement, Williams has coached in the NBA Development League and NBA as well as commentating for a variety of NBA teams. Williams is currently the color analyst for the Grand Canyon Antelopes men's basketball team.

== Early life and college career ==
Williams attended and played basketball for Glen A. Wilson High School in Hacienda Heights, California. He led the 1986 squad to the 1986 C.I.F State Championship Title. Williams was named a McDonald's All-American in 1986. Growing up, he was a passionate Los Angeles Lakers fan.

Williams enrolled at the University of North Carolina at Chapel Hill. Williams' parents died on October 15, 1987, when his father shot and killed his mother in their garage, then turned the gun on himself. He was 19 years old, and was in his sophomore year of college; coach Dean Smith notified him of the tragedy. Williams finished his college career with per-game averages of 10.9 points, 6.2 rebounds, and 1.2 blocks.

=== College statistics ===
Legend
GP	Games played	GS	Games started	MPG	Minutes per game
FG%	Field goal percentage	3P%	3-point field goal percentage	FT%	Free throw percentage
RPG	Rebounds per game	APG	Assists per game	SPG	Steals per game
BPG	Blocks per game	PPG	Points per game	**Bold**	Career high

Year	Team	GP	GS	MPG	FG%	3P%	FT%	RPG	APG	SPG	BPG	PPG
1986–87	North Carolina	**36**	1	15.0	.497	.000	.558	4.2	0.9	0.8	0.8	5.5
1987–88	North Carolina	34	**33**	**26.5**	**.572**	**.429**	**.673**	6.4	**1.2**	**1.3**	1.3	12.8
1988–89	North Carolina	35	30	22.9	.556	.000	.654	**7.3**	0.7	0.9	**1.4**	11.4
1989–90	North Carolina	33	30	24.6	.554	.143	.615	**7.3**	0.8	1.1	1.2	**14.5**
Career		138	94	22.1	.551	.235	.633	6.2	0.9	1.0	1.2	10.9

== Professional career ==
Undrafted in the 1990 NBA draft, after four years in college, Williams was signed by the Chicago Bulls in 1990. He played four seasons in Chicago, mostly as a reserve, and won three NBA championships in his first three seasons. On 7 June 1991, in game 3 of the Finals against the Los Angeles Lakers, he scored four points (all from the free throw line), grabbed two rebounds, and had two assists in only 11 minutes of play, in an eventual 104–96 overtime Bulls win. On February 16, 1994, Williams scored his career-high of 22 points in a 109–101 loss against the Miami Heat.

In 1994, Williams was signed by the Philadelphia 76ers, where he played for 4½ injury-plagued seasons before being traded to the Milwaukee Bucks in 1999. His career saw a resurgence of sorts in Milwaukee, where he averaged career highs of 7.6 points and 6.6 rebounds during the 1999–2000 season. On December 15, of that season, Williams scored 17 points and grabbed 15 rebounds in a win against the Orlando Magic. While in Milwaukee, Williams was considered a key part of the 2001 Bucks team that made it to the conference finals before losing to his former team, the Philadelphia 76ers. Williams was suspended for Game 7 of the Eastern Conference Finals series when a flagrant one foul was upgraded to a flagrant two foul after the game had ended, and the Bucks went on to lose the final game.

Until his retirement in 2005, at the age of 37, he also played for the Denver Nuggets, the Phoenix Suns (one ½ seasons), the Dallas Mavericks (27 games), and the Cleveland Cavaliers.

During his final season, he became LeBron James's oldest teammate and the only one born in the 1960s. Williams is also one of four players to be teammates of both James and Michael Jordan (Brendan Haywood, Larry Hughes and Jerry Stackhouse), as well as the only teammate of James to have played with Jordan on the Chicago Bulls.

== NBA career statistics ==
Legend
GP	Games played	GS	Games started	MPG	Minutes per game
FG%	Field goal percentage	3P%	3-point field goal percentage	FT%	Free throw percentage
RPG	Rebounds per game	APG	Assists per game	SPG	Steals per game
BPG	Blocks per game	PPG	Points per game	**Bold**	Career high
†	Won an NBA championship	*	Led the league

=== Regular season ===
Year	Team	GP	GS	MPG	FG%	3P%	FT%	RPG	APG	SPG	BPG	PPG
1990–91†	Chicago	51	0	6.6	.510	.500	.714	1.9	0.3	0.2	0.3	2.5
1991–92†	Chicago	63	0	11.0	.483	.000	.649	3.9	0.8	0.2	0.6	3.4
1992–93†	Chicago	71	5	19.3	.466	.000	.714	6.4	**1.0**	0.8	0.9	5.9
1993–94	Chicago	38	11	16.8	.483	.200	.612	4.8	**1.0**	0.4	0.6	**7.6**
1994–95	Philadelphia	**77**	43	**23.1**	.475	.000	.738	6.3	0.8	0.9	0.5	6.4
1995–96	Philadelphia	13	1	14.8	.517	.000	.833	3.5	0.4	0.5	0.5	3.1
1996–97	Philadelphia	62	**52**	21.2	.509	.000	.691	6.4	0.7	0.7	0.7	5.8
1997–98	Philadelphia	58	7	13.8	.437	.000	.810	3.6	0.5	0.3	0.4	4.1
1998–99	Philadelphia	2	0	8.5	.000	.000	.000	1.0	0.5	**1.0**	0.5	0.0
1998–99	Milwaukee	5	0	5.8	.333	.000	.571	2.4	0.0	0.2	0.2	2.8
1999–00	Milwaukee	68	46	21.9	.500	.000	.729	**6.6**	0.4	0.6	**1.0**	**7.6**
2000–01	Milwaukee	66	31	19.3	.474	.250	**.857**	5.5	0.5	0.7	0.5	6.1
2001–02	Denver	41	16	18.0	.396	.000	.732	5.1	0.3	0.4	0.8	4.9
2002–03	Phoenix	69	33	12.6	.411	.000	.786	2.8	0.3	0.4	0.3	4.0
2003–04	Phoenix	16	10	16.7	**.525**	**1.000**	.692	4.5	0.4	0.9	0.4	7.3
2003–04	Dallas	27	11	9.6	.435	.000	.500	2.2	0.4	0.2	0.3	3.0
2004–05	Cleveland	19	0	8.0	.293	.000	.818	1.6	0.4	0.2	0.3	1.7
Career		746	266	16.4	.467	.111	.721	4.7	0.6	0.5	0.6	5.1

=== Playoffs ===
Year	Team	GP	GS	MPG	FG%	3P%	FT%	RPG	APG	SPG	BPG	PPG
1990–91†	Chicago	12	0	6.0	.462	.000	.550	1.7	0.3	0.1	0.3	1.9
1991–92†	Chicago	**22***	0	14.6	.486	.000	.714	4.3	0.3	0.3	0.8	4.0
1992–93†	Chicago	19	0	20.8	.506	.000	.552	5.8	**1.4**	0.4	0.9	5.5
1993–94	Chicago	10	0	15.1	.421	.000	.714	3.9	0.7	**0.7**	0.3	6.3
1999–00	Milwaukee	5	0	18.6	**.639***	.000	.833	5.6	0.4	0.4	1.0	**10.2**
2000–01	Milwaukee	17	**17**	**22.2**	.492	.000	.571	**7.2**	0.7	0.6	**1.4**	7.9
2002–03	Phoenix	6	6	13.8	.344	.000	**1.000**	2.5	0.2	**0.7**	0.5	4.0
2003–04	Dallas	3	0	3.7	.000	.000	.000	1.3	0.0	0.0	0.3	0.0
Career		94	23	16.0	.480	.000	.634	4.6	0.6	0.4	0.8	5.2

== Post-retirement ==
Subsequently, Williams accepted the Cavaliers' offer to become a color commentator for the team's telecasts on FSN Ohio, beginning in 2005–06, and working alongside Michael Reghi. After two seasons, on 20 October 2007, the Milwaukee Journal Sentinel reported he would join the Milwaukee Bucks' commentary team. Besides doing pre and post-game analysis for home games, he also called some games while a popular emailer on the Tony Kornheiser radio show.

In 2008, Williams became a color commentator for the Phoenix Suns, broadcasting with Tom Leander and Gary Bender.

During the 2012–13 season, Williams was an assistant coach for the Idaho Stampede in the NBA Development League.

Prior to the 2013–14 season, Williams was hired as an assistant coach for the Milwaukee Bucks under Larry Drew.

As of the 2014–15 season, Williams serves as the analyst for Grand Canyon Antelopes men's basketball games on Fox 10 Extra, alongside play-by-play announcer Barry Buetel.

In 2020, on the "Sixers Talk" podcast, Williams credited Jordan and the Bulls with helping him have an NBA career. Williams had played four years at North Carolina but had gone undrafted in the NBA draft. Jordan invited Williams to a scrimmage, which also included other NBA pros, so Williams could prove his worth. Later, Jordan called then-Bulls general manager Jerry Krause and stated "I think Scott Williams might be able to help us out".
