= 1998–99 Orlando Magic season =

NBA professional basketball team season

- Head coach: Chuck Daly
- President: Bob Vander Weide
- General manager: John Gabriel
- Owner: Richard DeVos
- Arena: Orlando Arena

Results
- Record: 33–17 (.660)
- Place: Division: 2nd (Atlantic); Conference: 3rd (Eastern)
- Playoff finish: First round (lost to 76ers 1–3)
- Stats at Basketball Reference

Local media
- Television: WKCF; Sunshine Network
- Radio: WDBO

The 1998–99 Orlando Magic season was the tenth season for the Orlando Magic in the National Basketball Association. Due to a lockout, the regular season began on February 5, 1999, and was cut from 82 games to 50.

== Season summary ==
=== Off-season ===
The Magic had three first-round draft picks in the 1998 NBA draft; the team selected center Michael Doleac from the University of Utah with the twelfth overall pick, selected power forward Keon Clark from the University of Nevada, Las Vegas with the 13th overall pick, and selected small forward Matt Harpring out of Georgia Tech University with the 15th overall pick. However, Clark never played for the Magic, and was later on traded to the Denver Nuggets. During the off-season, the Magic signed free agents Isaac Austin, and former All-Star forward Dominique Wilkins, who previously played overseas in Italy, and would become teammates with his younger brother Gerald Wilkins.

For the season, the Magic redesigned their home and road uniforms, replacing the pinstripes from their previous uniforms with visible stars; both uniforms featured the team name "Magic" on the front of their jerseys. The white home uniforms featured silver stars, a blue and black trim, and blue outlines along with a black inline as side panels on their jerseys and shorts; the blue road uniforms featured darker blue stars, a black and silver trim, and black side panels with silver inlines and outlines. The team's new uniforms would remain in use until 2003, although in 2000, they would add their future alternate logo to the left leg of their shorts, and the team name on the back of their shorts.

=== Regular season ===
With the addition of Austin and Harpring, and with Penny Hardaway playing a full season after missing most of the previous season due to a knee injury, the Magic got off to a fast start by winning 14 of their first 18 games of the regular season. At mid-season, the team signed free agent B.J. Armstrong, who was previously released by the Los Angeles Lakers, who acquired him from the Charlotte Hornets in a mid-season trade. The Magic posted a six-game winning streak in April, but later on posted a five-game losing streak during that month, then won their final four games of the season. The Magic finished in second place in the Atlantic Division with a 33–17 record, earning the third seed in the Eastern Conference, and returning to the NBA playoffs after a one-year absence.

Hardaway averaged 15.8 points, 5.3 assists and 2.2 steals per game, while Nick Anderson averaged 14.9 points, 5.9 rebounds and 1.4 steals per game, and led the Magic with 96 three-point field goals, and Darrell Armstrong provided the team with 13.8 points, 6.7 assists and 2.2 steals per game, and contributed 69 three-point field goals; Armstrong was named the NBA Sixth Man of the Year, and was also named the NBA Most Improved Player of the Year. In addition, Austin averaged 9.7 points and 4.8 rebounds per game, while Horace Grant provided with 8.9 points and 7.0 rebounds per game, Harpring contributed 8.2 points and 4.3 rebounds per game, and Bo Outlaw averaged 6.5 points, 5.4 rebounds, 1.3 steals and 1.4 blocks per game, but only played 31 games due to a leg injury. Meanwhile, Doleac averaged 6.2 points and 3.0 rebounds per game, and Derek Strong provided with 5.1 points and 3.7 rebounds per game. Harpring was named to the NBA All-Rookie First Team, while Doleac was named to the NBA All-Rookie Second Team.

Darrell Armstrong finished in 15th place in Most Valuable Player voting, while Hardaway finished tied in 16th place, and head coach Chuck Daly finished in fourth place in Coach of the Year voting. The Magic finished 17th in the NBA in home-game attendance, with an attendance of 411,091 at the Orlando Arena during the regular season.

=== NBA playoffs ===
In the Eastern Conference First Round of the 1999 NBA playoffs, the Magic faced off against the 6th–seeded Philadelphia 76ers, a team that featured the league's top scorer Allen Iverson, Matt Geiger, and defensive shot-blocker Theo Ratliff. The Magic lost Game 1 to the 76ers at home, 104–90 at the Orlando Arena, but managed to win Game 2 at home, 79–68 to even the series. However, the Magic lost the next two games on the road, which included a Game 4 loss to the 76ers at the First Union Center, 101–91, thus losing the series in four games.

=== Aftermath ===
Following the season, head coach Chuck Daly retired, while Hardaway was traded to the Phoenix Suns after six seasons with the Magic, Anderson, the only member left from the team's inaugural season, was traded to the Sacramento Kings after ten seasons in Orlando, and Grant was dealt to the Seattle SuperSonics on draft day. Meanwhile, Austin was dealt to the Washington Wizards, B.J. Armstrong re-signed as a free agent with his former team, the Chicago Bulls, and both of the Wilkins' brothers, and veteran center Danny Schayes all retired.

== Draft picks ==
Round	Pick	Player	Position	Nationality	School/Club team
1	12	Michael Doleac	C	United States	Utah
1	13	Keon Clark	PF/C	United States	UNLV
1	15	Matt Harpring	SF/SG	United States	Georgia Tech
2	42	Miles Simon	SG	United States	Arizona

== Roster ==
1998–99 Orlando Magic roster
Players

Pos.	No.	Player	Height	Weight	DOB	From
G/F	25	Nick Anderson	6 ft 6 in (1.98 m)	205 lb (93 kg)	1968–01–20	Illinois
G	2	B. J. Armstrong	6 ft 2 in (1.88 m)	175 lb (79 kg)	1967–09–09	Iowa
G	10	Darrell Armstrong	6 ft 0 in (1.83 m)	170 lb (77 kg)	1968–06–22	Fayetteville State
C	8	Isaac Austin	6 ft 10 in (2.08 m)	255 lb (116 kg)	1969–08–18	Arizona State
C	51	Michael Doleac	6 ft 11 in (2.11 m)	262 lb (119 kg)	1977–06–15	Utah
F	54	Horace Grant	6 ft 10 in (2.08 m)	215 lb (98 kg)	1965–07–04	Clemson
G	1	Penny Hardaway	6 ft 7 in (2.01 m)	195 lb (88 kg)	1971–07–18	Memphis
F	15	Matt Harpring	6 ft 7 in (2.01 m)	231 lb (105 kg)	1976–05–31	Georgia Tech
C	52	Jonathan Kerner (injured)	6 ft 11 in (2.11 m)	245 lb (111 kg)	1974–06–06	East Carolina
F	45	Bo Outlaw	6 ft 8 in (2.03 m)	210 lb (95 kg)	1971–04–13	Houston
C	24	Danny Schayes	6 ft 11 in (2.11 m)	235 lb (107 kg)	1959–05–10	Syracuse
G	34	Miles Simon (injured)	6 ft 3 in (1.91 m)	202 lb (92 kg)	1975–11–21	Arizona
F	33	Derek Strong	6 ft 8 in (2.03 m)	220 lb (100 kg)	1968–02–09	Xavier
F	21	Dominique Wilkins	6 ft 8 in (2.03 m)	200 lb (91 kg)	1960–01–12	Georgia
G	9	Gerald Wilkins (injured)	6 ft 6 in (1.98 m)	185 lb (84 kg)	1963–09–11	Chattanooga

Coaches
Head coach
- Chuck Daly
Assistant(s)
- Eric Musselman
- Tree Rollins
- Tom Sterner
- Brendan Suhr

Legend
- (DP) Unsigned draft pick
- (FA) Free agent
- (S) Suspended
- Injured

Roster
Updated: March 14, 1999

== Regular season ==
=== Season standings ===
Atlantic Division	W	L	PCT	GB	Home	Road	Div	GP
c-Miami Heat	33	17	.660	–	18‍–‍7	15‍–‍10	12–8	50
x-Orlando Magic	33	17	.660	–	21‍–‍4	12‍–‍13	12–6	50
x-Philadelphia 76ers	28	22	.560	5.0	17‍–‍8	11‍–‍14	9–10	50
x-New York Knicks	27	23	.540	6.0	19‍–‍6	8‍–‍17	12–8	50
Boston Celtics	19	31	.380	14.0	10‍–‍15	9‍–‍16	10–9	50
Washington Wizards	18	32	.360	15.0	13‍–‍12	5‍–‍20	6–13	50
New Jersey Nets	16	34	.320	17.0	12‍–‍13	4‍–‍21	6–13	50

Eastern Conference
#	Team	W	L	PCT	GB	GP
1	c-Miami Heat *	33	17	.660	–	50
2	y-Indiana Pacers *	33	17	.660	–	50
3	x-Orlando Magic	33	17	.660	–	50
4	x-Atlanta Hawks	31	19	.620	2.0	50
5	x-Detroit Pistons	29	21	.580	4.0	50
6	x-Philadelphia 76ers	28	22	.560	5.0	50
7	x-Milwaukee Bucks	28	22	.560	5.0	50
8	x-New York Knicks	27	23	.540	6.0	50
9	Charlotte Hornets	26	24	.520	7.0	50
10	Toronto Raptors	23	27	.460	10.0	50
11	Cleveland Cavaliers	22	28	.440	11.0	50
12	Boston Celtics	19	31	.380	14.0	50
13	Washington Wizards	18	32	.360	15.0	50
14	New Jersey Nets	16	34	.320	17.0	50
15	Chicago Bulls	13	37	.260	20.0	50

z – clinched division title
y – clinched division title
x – clinched playoff spot

== Playoffs ==
1999 playoff game log
First round: 1–3 (home: 1–1; road: 0–2)

Game	Date	Team	Score	High points	High rebounds	High assists	Location Attendance	Series
1	May 9	Philadelphia	L 90–104	Penny Hardaway (19)	Horace Grant (10)	Armstrong, Hardaway (6)	Orlando Arena; 15,267	0–1
2	May 11	Philadelphia	W 79–68	Penny Hardaway (22)	Nick Anderson (8)	three players tied (4)	Orlando Arena; 16,345	1–1
3	May 13	@ Philadelphia	L 85–97	Nick Anderson (23)	Matt Harpring (10)	Darrell Armstrong (7)	First Union Center; 20,874	1–2
4	May 15	@ Philadelphia	L 91–101	Nick Anderson (29)	Austin, Grant (8)	Darrell Armstrong (8)	First Union Center; 20,550	1–3

1999 schedule

== Player statistics ==
=== Regular season ===
Player	POS	GP	GS	MP	REB	AST	STL	BLK	PTS	MPG	RPG	APG	SPG	BPG	PPG
Penny Hardaway	SG	50	50	1,944	284	266	111	23	791	38.9	5.7	5.3	2.2	.5	15.8
Horace Grant	PF	50	50	1,660	351	90	46	60	443	33.2	7.0	1.8	.9	1.2	8.9
Matt Harpring	SF	50	22	1,114	214	45	30	6	408	22.3	4.3	.9	.6	.1	8.2
Darrell Armstrong	PG	50	15	1,502	180	335	108	4	690	30.0	3.6	6.7	2.2	.1	13.8
Isaac Austin	C	49	49	1,259	237	89	47	35	477	25.7	4.8	1.8	1.0	.7	9.7
Michael Doleac	C	49	0	780	148	20	19	17	304	15.9	3.0	.4	.4	.3	6.2
Nick Anderson	SF	47	39	1,581	277	91	64	15	701	33.6	5.9	1.9	1.4	.3	14.9
Derek Strong	PF	44	0	695	161	17	15	7	223	15.8	3.7	.4	.3	.2	5.1
Bo Outlaw	PF	31	22	851	167	56	40	43	203	27.5	5.4	1.8	1.3	1.4	6.5
Dominique Wilkins	SF	27	2	252	71	16	4	1	134	9.3	2.6	.6	.1	.0	5.0
B. J. Armstrong^{†}	PG	22	0	180	23	34	9	0	48	8.2	1.0	1.5	.4	.0	2.2
Danny Schayes	C	19	1	143	14	4	1	2	28	7.5	.7	.2	.1	.1	1.5
Doug Overton^{†}	PG	6	0	33	2	3	1	0	18	5.5	.3	.5	.2	.0	3.0
Miles Simon	SG	5	0	19	2	0	1	0	2	3.8	.4	.0	.2	.0	.4
Gerald Wilkins	SG	3	0	28	1	1	0	0	2	9.3	.3	.3	.0	.0	.7
Jonathan Kerner	C	1	0	5	0	0	0	0	0	5.0	.0	.0	.0	.0	.0
Kevin Ollie^{†}	PG	1	0	4	1	0	0	0	1	4.0	1.0	.0	.0	.0	1.0

=== Playoffs ===
Player	POS	GP	GS	MP	REB	AST	STL	BLK	PTS	MPG	RPG	APG	SPG	BPG	PPG
Penny Hardaway	SG	4	4	167	20	22	9	1	76	41.8	5.0	5.5	2.3	.3	19.0
Darrell Armstrong	PG	4	4	163	20	25	9	0	59	40.8	5.0	6.3	2.3	.0	14.8
Nick Anderson	SF	4	4	152	27	9	9	0	83	38.0	6.8	2.3	2.3	.0	20.8
Horace Grant	PF	4	4	128	28	5	2	2	27	32.0	7.0	1.3	.5	.5	6.8
Isaac Austin	C	4	4	112	16	8	4	3	26	28.0	4.0	2.0	1.0	.8	6.5
Bo Outlaw	PF	4	0	83	15	2	1	8	18	20.8	3.8	.5	.3	2.0	4.5
Matt Harpring	SF	4	0	82	20	7	1	0	33	20.5	5.0	1.8	.3	.0	8.3
Michael Doleac	C	4	0	43	12	0	0	1	17	10.8	3.0	.0	.0	.3	4.3
B. J. Armstrong	PG	2	0	3	0	1	0	0	0	1.5	.0	.5	.0	.0	.0
Derek Strong	PF	1	0	16	0	0	1	0	4	16.0	.0	.0	1.0	.0	4.0
Danny Schayes	C	1	0	8	0	0	0	0	0	8.0	.0	.0	.0	.0	.0
Dominique Wilkins	SF	1	0	3	0	0	0	0	2	3.0	.0	.0	.0	.0	2.0

- ^{†} Denotes player spent time with another team in the season. Stats reflect time with the Magic only.

== Awards and records ==
- Darrell Armstrong – Sixth Man of the Year, Most Improved Player
- Matt Harpring – All-Rookie 1st team
- Michael Doleac – All-Rookie 2nd team
