= 1998–99 Toronto Raptors season =

NBA team season

- Head coach: Butch Carter
- General manager: Glen Grunwald
- Owners: Maple Leaf Sports & Entertainment
- Arena: SkyDome; Maple Leaf Gardens; Air Canada Centre

Results
- Record: 23–27 (.460)
- Place: Division: 6th (Central); Conference: 10th (Eastern)
- Playoff finish: Did not qualify
- Stats at Basketball Reference

Local media
- Television: CKVR-TV; Citytv; TSN; CTV Sportsnet Ontario; CTV
- Radio: CJCL

The 1998–99 Toronto Raptors season was the fourth season for the Toronto Raptors in the National Basketball Association. Due to a lockout, the regular season began on February 5, 1999, and was cut from 82 games to 50.

== Season summary ==
=== Off-season ===
The Raptors received the fourth overall pick in the 1998 NBA draft, and selected small forward Antawn Jamison from the University of North Carolina; however, the team soon traded Jamison to the Golden State Warriors in exchange for his "UNC" college teammate, shooting guard and fifth overall pick, Vince Carter, along with cash considerations on draft day. Carter is also second-year star Tracy McGrady's cousin. During the off-season, the team acquired Charles Oakley from the New York Knicks, acquired Kevin Willis from the Houston Rockets, and signed free agent and second-year center Michael Stewart.

=== Regular season ===
During the regular season, the Raptors moved into their new arena known as the Air Canada Centre. With the addition of Carter, Willis and Oakley, the Raptors struggled losing five of their first six games of the season. After a 6–12 start to the season, the team soon recovered and won 12 of their next 14 games, posting a five-game winning streak in March, and posting a six-game winning streak between March and April; the team also posted an 11–6 record in March, which was their first monthly winning record in franchise history. The Raptors held an 18–14 record as of April 4, 1999, and were on the verge of making their first ever NBA playoff appearance in franchise history. However, the team struggled losing 13 of their final 18 games of the season, which included two six-game losing streaks between April and May. The Raptors finished in sixth place in the Central Division with a 23–27 record, and failed to qualify for the playoffs.

Carter averaged 18.3 points, 5.7 rebounds and 1.5 blocks per game, and was named the NBA Rookie of the Year, and also named to the NBA All-Rookie First Team. In addition, Doug Christie averaged 15.2 points, 3.7 assists and 2.3 steals per game, while Willis provided the team with 12.0 points and 8.3 rebounds per game, and sixth man Dee Brown contributed 11.2 points per game off the bench, and led the league with 135 three-point field goals. Meanwhile, McGrady averaged 9.3 points and 5.7 rebounds per game off the bench, Oakley averaged 7.0 points and 7.5 rebounds per game, John Wallace contributed 8.6 points per game off the bench, and second-year guard Alvin Williams contributed 5.0 points and 2.6 assists per game.

Carter also finished tied in 16th place in Most Valuable Player voting, while Brown finished tied in fifth place in Sixth Man of the Year voting; McGrady finished tied in eighth place in Most Improved Player voting, while Brown finished tied in tenth place, and head coach Butch Carter finished tied in eighth place in Coach of the Year voting. The Raptors finished tenth in the NBA in home-game attendance, with an attendance of 439,190 at the SkyDome and Air Canada Centre during the regular season.

=== Aftermath ===
Following the season, Wallace re-signed as a free agent with his former team, the New York Knicks, and Reggie Slater was released to free agency.

== Offseason ==
- June 25, 1998 – The Raptors trade Marcus Camby to the New York Knicks in exchange for Charles Oakley.
- January 21, 1999 – The Raptors trade Chauncey Billups to the Denver Nuggets for the Nuggets first-round pick in the 1999 NBA draft.

=== NBA draft ===
Carter was drafted by the NBA's Golden State Warriors 5th overall and then traded to the Toronto Raptors for Antawn Jamison, his UNC college teammate and best friend.

Round	Pick	Player	Position	Nationality	College
1	4	Antawn Jamison (traded to Golden State)	SF/PF	United States	North Carolina
2	47	Tyson Wheeler	PG	United States	Rhode Island

== Roster ==
1998–99 Toronto Raptors roster
Players

Pos.	No.	Player	Height	Weight	DOB	From
G	7	Dee Brown	6 ft 1 in (1.85 m)	160 lb (73 kg)	1968–11–29	Jacksonville
G/F	15	Vince Carter	6 ft 6 in (1.98 m)	220 lb (100 kg)	1977–01–26	North Carolina
G	13	Doug Christie	6 ft 6 in (1.98 m)	200 lb (91 kg)	1970–05–09	Pepperdine
G	11	Negele Knight	6 ft 1 in (1.85 m)	175 lb (79 kg)	1967–03–06	Dayton
F	22	Sean Marks (injured)	6 ft 10 in (2.08 m)	250 lb (113 kg)	1975–08–23	California
F	1	Tracy McGrady	6 ft 8 in (2.03 m)	210 lb (95 kg)	1979–05–24	Mt. Zion Christian Academy HS (NC)
F/C	34	Charles Oakley	6 ft 8 in (2.03 m)	225 lb (102 kg)	1963–12–18	Virginia Union
F	35	Reggie Slater	6 ft 7 in (2.01 m)	215 lb (98 kg)	1970–08–27	Wyoming
F/C	4	Michael Stewart	6 ft 10 in (2.08 m)	230 lb (104 kg)	1975–04–25	California
F/C	12	John Thomas	6 ft 9 in (2.06 m)	265 lb (120 kg)	1975–09–08	Minnesota
F	44	John Wallace	6 ft 8 in (2.03 m)	225 lb (102 kg)	1974–02–09	Syracuse
G	20	Alvin Williams	6 ft 5 in (1.96 m)	185 lb (84 kg)	1974–08–06	Villanova
G	14	Micheal Williams (injured)	6 ft 2 in (1.88 m)	175 lb (79 kg)	1966–07–23	Baylor
C	42	Kevin Willis	7 ft 0 in (2.13 m)	220 lb (100 kg)	1962–09–06	Michigan State

Coaches
Head coach
- Butch Carter
Assistant(s)
- Joe Harrington
- Brian James
- Jim Thomas

Legend
- (DP) Unsigned draft pick
- (FA) Free agent
- (S) Suspended
- Injured

Roster
Updated: February 19, 1999

== Regular season ==
=== Highs ===
- The Raptors played their final game at Skydome on February 19, 1999.
- The first Raptors game at Air Canada Centre took place on February 21, 1999, versus the Vancouver Grizzlies.

=== Season standings ===
Central Division	W	L	PCT	GB	Home	Road	Div	GP
y-Indiana Pacers	33	17	.660	–	18‍–‍7	15‍–‍10	15–7	50
x-Atlanta Hawks	31	19	.620	2.0	16‍–‍9	15‍–‍10	15–8	50
x-Detroit Pistons	29	21	.580	4.0	17‍–‍8	12‍–‍13	13–8	50
x-Milwaukee Bucks	28	22	.560	5.0	17‍–‍8	11‍–‍14	13–11	50
Charlotte Hornets	26	24	.520	7.0	16‍–‍9	10‍–‍15	12–10	50
Toronto Raptors	23	27	.460	10.0	14‍–‍11	9‍–‍16	9–14	50
Cleveland Cavaliers	22	28	.440	11.0	15‍–‍10	7‍–‍18	9–13	50
Chicago Bulls	13	37	.260	20.0	8‍–‍17	5‍–‍20	4–19	50

Eastern Conference
#	Team	W	L	PCT	GB	GP
1	c-Miami Heat *	33	17	.660	–	50
2	y-Indiana Pacers *	33	17	.660	–	50
3	x-Orlando Magic	33	17	.660	–	50
4	x-Atlanta Hawks	31	19	.620	2.0	50
5	x-Detroit Pistons	29	21	.580	4.0	50
6	x-Philadelphia 76ers	28	22	.560	5.0	50
7	x-Milwaukee Bucks	28	22	.560	5.0	50
8	x-New York Knicks	27	23	.540	6.0	50
9	Charlotte Hornets	26	24	.520	7.0	50
10	Toronto Raptors	23	27	.460	10.0	50
11	Cleveland Cavaliers	22	28	.440	11.0	50
12	Boston Celtics	19	31	.380	14.0	50
13	Washington Wizards	18	32	.360	15.0	50
14	New Jersey Nets	16	34	.320	17.0	50
15	Chicago Bulls	13	37	.260	20.0	50

=== Game log ===
1998–99 game log
February: 4–8 (home: 3–3; road: 1–5)

Game	Date	Team	Score	High points	High rebounds	High assists	Location Attendance	Record
1	February 5	@ Boston	W 103–92	Kevin Willis (28)	Kevin Willis (16)	Alvin Williams (6)	FleetCenter; 17,892	1–0
2	February 6	@ Washington	L 97–98	Charles Oakley (18)	Charles Oakley (8)	Alvin Williams (9)	MCI Center; 19,335	1-1
3	February 9	Milwaukee	L 77–91	Vince Carter (22)	Charles Oakley, Kevin Willis (11)	Dee Brown (6)	Maple Leaf Gardens; 14,577	1–2
4	February 11	@ Miami	L 84–102	Doug Christie (20)	Michael Stewart (7)	Doug Christie, Alvin Williams (3)	Miami Arena; 14,832	1–3
5	February 16	@ New York	L 85–95	Vince Carter (17)	Charles Oakley (7)	Doug Christie (4)	Madison Square Garden; 19,763	1–4
6	February 18	Washington	L 88–95	Kevin Willis (25)	Kevin Willis (14)	Doug Christie (6)	SkyDome; 14,292	1–5
7	February 19	Milwaukee	W 90–82	Doug Christie (20)	Kevin Willis (11)	Tracy McGrady (7)	SkyDome; 14,888	2–5
8	February 21	Vancouver	W 102–87	Vince Carter (27)	Kevin Willis (15)	Charles Oakley (6)	Air Canada Centre; 19,800	3–5
9	February 23	@ Detroit	L 80–106	John Wallace (14)	Doug Christie, John Wallace (5)	Doug Christie, Tracy McGrady (4)	The Palace of Auburn Hills; 14,187	3–6
10	February 24	@ Indiana	L 84–104	Vince Carter (28)	Kevin Willis (13)	Tracy McGrady (3)	Market Square Arena; 14,700	3–7
11	February 26	Minnesota	W 102–92	Vince Carter (21)	Kevin Willis (16)	Doug Christie (9)	Air Canada Centre; 15,122	4–7
12	February 28	Chicago	L 88–90 (OT)	Kevin Willis (19)	Charles Oakley (12)	Dee Brown (7)	Air Canada Centre; 14,173	4–8

March: 11–6 (home: 6–1; road: 5–5)

Game	Date	Team	Score	High points	High rebounds	High assists	Location Attendance	Record
13	March 1	@ Charlotte	L 88–91	Dee Brown, Vince Carter, Doug Christie (15)	John Wallace (10)	Alvin Williams (6)	Charlotte Coliseum; 18,039	4–9
14	March 4	@ Atlanta	W 86–77	Dee Brown (16)	Tracy McGrady, Charles Oakley (8)	Doug Christie, Kevin Willis (4)	Alexander Memorial Coliseum; 7,877	5–9
15	March 5	Orlando	L 84–89	Kevin Willis (21)	Kevin Willis (14)	Tracy McGrady, Alvin Williams (6)	Air Canada Centre; 15,601	5–10
16	March 7	Boston	W 105–92	Vince Carter (26)	Charles Oakley (13)	Doug Christie (7)	Air Canada Centre; 16,635	6–10
17	March 11	@ Miami	L 73–83	John Wallace (20)	John Wallace (7)	Charles Oakley (3)	Miami Arena; 14,911	6–11
18	March 13	@ Atlanta	L 75–86	Doug Christie (21)	Vince Carter (9)	Doug Christie (4)	Alexander Memorial Coliseum; 8,456	6–12
19	March 15	Charlotte	W 89–82	Doug Christie (18)	Charles Oakley (10)	Doug Christie (5)	Air Canada Centre; 15,329	7–12
20	March 16	New Jersey	W 100–85	Vince Carter (20)	Vince Carter (15)	Dee Brown (5)	Air Canada Centre; 15,731	8–12
21	March 17	@ Detroit	W 103–101	Vince Carter (28)	Tracy McGrady (7)	Tracy McGrady (5)	The Palace of Auburn Hills; 14,981	9–12
22	March 19	L.A. Clippers	W 93–82	Vince Carter (26)	Tracy McGrady (12)	Dee Brown, Alvin Williams (5)	Air Canada Centre; 18,839	10–12
23	March 21	New York	W 85–81 (OT)	Vince Carter (23)	Vince Carter, Charles Oakley (12)	Charles Oakley (4)	Air Canada Centre; 19,266	11–12
24	March 22	@ New Jersey	L 87–106	John Wallace (19)	John Wallace (7)	Vince Carter, Charles Oakley (3)	Continental Airlines Arena; 14,697	11–13
25	March 23	@ Chicago	W 113–90	Dee Brown (25)	Vince Carter (11)	Doug Christie (8)	United Center; 22,236	12–13
26	March 25	@ Houston	L 104–113	Vince Carter (32)	Charles Oakley (8)	Vince Carter (6)	Compaq Center; 16,285	12–14
27	March 26	@ San Antonio	W 93–91	Dee Brown (23)	Charles Oakley, Kevin Willis (7)	Doug Christie, Charles Oakley (5)	Alamodome; 16,290	13–14
28	March 28	Chicago	W 91–78	Vince Carter (22)	Charles Oakley (13)	Doug Christie (6)	Air Canada Centre; 18,461	14-14
29	March 30	@ Cleveland	W 101–91	Dee Brown (28)	Charles Oakley (11)	Vince Carter, Tracy McGrady (6)	Gund Arena; 14,209	15–14

April: 7–11 (home: 4–7; road: 3–4)

Game	Date	Team	Score	High points	High rebounds	High assists	Location Attendance	Record
30	April 1	Indiana	W 88–87	Vince Carter (31)	Vince Carter (11)	Alvin Williams (8)	Air Canada Centre; 18,666	16–14
31	April 3	Washington	W 87–85	Kevin Willis (22)	Kevin Willis (11)	Vince Carter, Doug Christie, Charles Oakley (4)	Air Canada Centre; 18,929	17–14
32	April 4	Philadelphia	W 97–82	Doug Christie (22)	Kevin Willis (11)	Doug Christie, Charles Oakley, Kevin Willis (4)	Air Canada Centre; 18,462	18–14
33	April 6	Miami	L 70–92	Tracy McGrady, John Wallace (12)	Tracy McGrady (10)	Dee Brown (4)	Air Canada Centre; 19,209	18–15
34	April 8	Boston	L 89–101	Vince Carter (31)	Kevin Willis (10)	Tracy McGrady, Charles Oakley (5)	Air Canada Centre; 16,949	18–16
35	April 9	@ New Jersey	L 99–106	Vince Carter (26)	Kevin Willis (15)	Dee Brown (6)	Continental Airlines Arena; 15,764	18–17
36	April 12	Indiana	L 99–109	Vince Carter (29)	Kevin Willis (19)	Doug Christie (8)	Air Canada Centre; 19,427	18-18
37	April 14	@ Philadelphia	L 78–96	Doug Christie (19)	Kevin Willis (10)	Dee Brown, Charles Oakley (4)	First Union Center; 17,474	18–19
38	April 16	Cleveland	L 90–91 (OT)	Doug Christie (22)	Vince Carter (12)	Vince Carter (8)	Air Canada Centre; 19,280	18–20
39	April 17	@ New York	W 93–90	Vince Carter (21)	Kevin Willis (10)	Charles Oakley (6)	Madison Square Garden; 19,763	19–20
40	April 19	Orlando	W 90–72	Tracy McGrady, Kevin Willis (16)	Tracy McGrady (11)	Alvin Williams (5)	Air Canada Centre; 17,715	20-20
41	April 20	Atlanta	L 81–103	Vince Carter (16)	Kevin Willis (8)	Dee Brown (5)	Air Canada Centre; 18,439	20–21
42	April 21	@ Washington	W 107–91	Doug Christie (28)	Charles Oakley (9)	Doug Christie (7)	MCI Center; 12,214	21-21
43	April 23	@ Orlando	W 95–88	Vince Carter (24)	Tracy McGrady (8)	Dee Brown (4)	Orlando Arena; 17,248	22–21
44	April 25	Detroit	L 83–91	Vince Carter (18)	Kevin Willis (7)	Vince Carter (8)	Air Canada Centre; 19,800	22-22
45	April 27	Charlotte	L 98–108	Tracy McGrady (27)	Charles Oakley (10)	Charles Oakley (5)	Air Canada Centre; 19,800	22–23
46	April 28	@ Milwaukee	L 102–115	Dee Brown (29)	Vince Carter (7)	Doug Christie (5)	Bradley Center; 15,463	22–24
47	April 30	@ Cleveland	L 83–91	Vince Carter (25)	Tracy McGrady (13)	Vince Carter (5)	Gund Arena; 13,958	22–25

May: 1–2 (home: 1–0; road: 0–2)

Game	Date	Team	Score	High points	High rebounds	High assists	Location Attendance	Record
48	May 1	@ Philadelphia	L 96–103	Doug Christie (27)	John Wallace (8)	Charles Oakley (6)	First Union Center; 20,550	22–26
49	May 4	@ Milwaukee	L 86–99	Vince Carter (26)	Tracy McGrady, Reggie Slater (6)	Charles Oakley (5)	Bradley Center; 13,859	22–27
50	May 5	Cleveland	W 96–87	Doug Christie (26)	John Thomas (11)	Tracy McGrady, Charles Oakley (7)	Air Canada Centre; 19,800	23–27

1998–99 season schedule

== Player statistics ==
=== Regular season ===
Player	POS	GP	GS	MP	REB	AST	STL	BLK	PTS	MPG	RPG	APG	SPG	BPG	PPG
Doug Christie	SG	50	50	1,768	207	187	113	26	760	35.4	4.1	3.7	2.3	.5	15.2
Charles Oakley	PF	50	50	1,633	374	168	46	21	348	32.7	7.5	3.4	.9	.4	7.0
Vince Carter	SF	50	49	1,760	283	149	55	77	913	35.2	5.7	3.0	1.1	1.5	18.3
Alvin Williams	PG	50	45	1,051	82	130	51	12	248	21.0	1.6	2.6	1.0	.2	5.0
Tracy McGrady	SF	49	2	1,106	278	113	52	66	458	22.6	5.7	2.3	1.1	1.3	9.3
Dee Brown	PG	49	0	1,377	103	143	56	8	549	28.1	2.1	2.9	1.1	.2	11.2
John Wallace	SF	48	3	812	171	46	12	43	411	16.9	3.6	1.0	.3	.9	8.6
Kevin Willis	C	42	38	1,216	350	67	28	28	504	29.0	8.3	1.6	.7	.7	12.0
Michael Stewart	C	42	2	394	99	5	4	28	61	9.4	2.4	.1	.1	.7	1.5
John Thomas	C	39	11	593	134	15	17	9	169	15.2	3.4	.4	.4	.2	4.3
Reggie Slater	PF	30	0	263	70	5	3	3	115	8.8	2.3	.2	.1	.1	3.8
Sean Marks	PF	8	0	28	1	0	1	0	11	3.5	.1	.0	.1	.0	1.4
Negele Knight	PG	6	0	56	6	8	1	0	8	9.3	1.0	1.3	.2	.0	1.3
Micheal Williams	PG	2	0	15	1	0	0	0	2	7.5	.5	.0	.0	.0	1.0
Mark Baker	PG	1	0	2	0	0	0	0	0	2.0	.0	.0	.0	.0	.0
William Cunningham^{†}	C	1	0	1	0	0	0	0	0	1.0	.0	.0	.0	.0	.0

- ^{†} Denotes player spent time with another team in the season. Stats reflect time with the Raptors only.

== Award winners ==
- Vince Carter, NBA Rookie of the Year
- Vince Carter, NBA All-Rookie First Team
