= 1998–99 New Jersey Nets season =

NBA professional basketball team season

- Head coach: John Calipari (fired); Don Casey
- President: Michael Rowe
- General manager: John Nash
- Owners: Community Youth Organization
- Arena: Continental Airlines Arena

Results
- Record: 16–34 (.320)
- Place: Division: 7th (Atlantic); Conference: 14th (Eastern)
- Playoff finish: Did not qualify
- Stats at Basketball Reference

Local media
- Television: WPXN-TV; Fox Sports New York
- Radio: WOR

The 1998–99 New Jersey Nets season was the Nets' 32nd season in the National Basketball Association, and 23rd season in East Rutherford, New Jersey. Due to a lockout, the regular season began on February 5, 1999, and was cut from 82 games to 50.

== Season summary ==
=== Off-season ===
During the off-season, the Nets signed free agents Eric Murdock and Scott Burrell, and acquired Jim McIlvaine from the Seattle SuperSonics.

For the season, the Nets revealed new gray alternate road uniforms, which featured a V-shaped collar, a red, silver and dark navy blue trim, and dark navy blue side panels on their jerseys and shorts. The new alternate uniforms would remain in use until 2005, although they would be slightly redesigned in 2000, where the team would change the state name New Jersey, and the jersey number from dark navy blue to white.

=== Regular season ===
Despite the addition of Murdock, Burrell and McIlvaine, the Nets struggled losing 18 of their first 21 games of the regular season, which included an eight-game losing streak in March. Head coach John Calipari was fired after a 3–17 start to the season, and was replaced with assistant coach Don Casey. At mid-season, Sam Cassell, who was out due to an ankle injury after four games, was traded along with Chris Gatling to the Milwaukee Bucks in a three-team trade, as the Nets acquired Stephon Marbury from the Minnesota Timberwolves, and acquired Jamie Feick from the Bucks. As the season progressed, Jayson Williams suffered a severe knee injury in April, and was out for the remainder of the season after 30 games. Near the end of the season, the team signed free agent and 7' 7" Romanian center Gheorghe Mureșan, as the Nets finished in last place in the Atlantic Division with a disappointing 16–34 record.

Marbury averaged 23.4 points and 8.7 assists per game in 31 games after the trade, while second-year star Keith Van Horn averaged 21.8 points and 8.5 rebounds per game. In addition, Kerry Kittles provided the team with 12.9 points and 1.7 steals per game, while Kendall Gill contributed 11.8 points and 2.7 steals per game, and Williams averaged 8.1 points, 12.0 rebounds and 2.0 blocks per game. Meanwhile, Murdock contributed 7.9 points, 4.4 assists and 1.5 steals per game, but only played just 15 games due to a groin injury, Feick averaged 6.8 points and 11.0 rebounds per game in 26 games, Burrell provided with 6.6 points and 3.7 rebounds per game, and Lucious Harris contributed 5.4 points per game.

The Nets finished 21st in the NBA in home-game attendance, with an attendance of 400,387 at the Continental Airlines Arena during the regular season.

=== Aftermath ===
Following the season, Murdock was traded to the Los Angeles Clippers, and Rony Seikaly was released to free agency and then retired.

== Offseason ==
=== Draft picks ===
The Nets had no draft picks in 1998.

== Roster ==
1998–99 New Jersey Nets roster
Players

Pos.	No.	Player	Height	Weight	DOB	From
F	24	Scott Burrell	6 ft 7 in (2.01 m)	218 lb (99 kg)	1971-01-12	Connecticut
G	43	Chris Carr	6 ft 5 in (1.96 m)	207 lb (94 kg)	1974-03-12	Southern Illinois
C	51	William Cunningham	6 ft 11 in (2.11 m)	250 lb (113 kg)	1974-03-25	Temple
F	14	Jamie Feick	6 ft 9 in (2.06 m)	255 lb (116 kg)	1974-07-03	Michigan State
G/F	13	Kendall Gill	6 ft 5 in (1.96 m)	195 lb (88 kg)	1968-05-25	Illinois
G/F	12	Lucious Harris	6 ft 5 in (1.96 m)	190 lb (86 kg)	1970-12-18	Long Beach State
F	42	Mark Hendrickson	6 ft 9 in (2.06 m)	220 lb (100 kg)	1974-06-23	Washington State
G	30	Kerry Kittles	6 ft 5 in (1.96 m)	179 lb (81 kg)	1974-06-12	Villanova
G	33	Stephon Marbury	6 ft 2 in (1.88 m)	180 lb (82 kg)	1977-02-20	Georgia Tech
C	22	Jim McIlvaine (injured)	7 ft 1 in (2.16 m)	240 lb (109 kg)	1972-07-30	Marquette
G	5	Eric Murdock (injured)	6 ft 1 in (1.85 m)	190 lb (86 kg)	1968-06-14	Providence
C	77	Gheorghe Mureșan	7 ft 7 in (2.31 m)	303 lb (137 kg)	1971-02-14	Romania
G	1	Elliot Perry	6 ft 0 in (1.83 m)	150 lb (68 kg)	1969-03-28	Memphis
C	2	Rony Seikaly	6 ft 11 in (2.11 m)	230 lb (104 kg)	1965-05-10	Syracuse
F	44	Keith Van Horn (injured)	6 ft 10 in (2.08 m)	220 lb (100 kg)	1975-10-23	Utah
F/C	55	Jayson Williams (injured)	6 ft 9 in (2.06 m)	240 lb (109 kg)	1968-02-22	St. John's

Coaches
Head coach
- Don Casey
Assistant(s)
- Johnny Davis
- Kenny Gattison
- Eddie Jordan
- Jim Lynam
- Mike O'Koren

Legend
- (DP) Unsigned draft pick
- (FA) Free agent
- (S) Suspended
- Injured

Roster

== Regular season ==
=== Season standings ===
Atlantic Division	W	L	PCT	GB	Home	Road	Div	GP
c-Miami Heat	33	17	.660	–	18‍–‍7	15‍–‍10	12–8	50
x-Orlando Magic	33	17	.660	–	21‍–‍4	12‍–‍13	12–6	50
x-Philadelphia 76ers	28	22	.560	5.0	17‍–‍8	11‍–‍14	9–10	50
x-New York Knicks	27	23	.540	6.0	19‍–‍6	8‍–‍17	12–8	50
Boston Celtics	19	31	.380	14.0	10‍–‍15	9‍–‍16	10–9	50
Washington Wizards	18	32	.360	15.0	13‍–‍12	5‍–‍20	6–13	50
New Jersey Nets	16	34	.320	17.0	12‍–‍13	4‍–‍21	6–13	50

Eastern Conference
#	Team	W	L	PCT	GB	GP
1	c-Miami Heat *	33	17	.660	–	50
2	y-Indiana Pacers *	33	17	.660	–	50
3	x-Orlando Magic	33	17	.660	–	50
4	x-Atlanta Hawks	31	19	.620	2.0	50
5	x-Detroit Pistons	29	21	.580	4.0	50
6	x-Philadelphia 76ers	28	22	.560	5.0	50
7	x-Milwaukee Bucks	28	22	.560	5.0	50
8	x-New York Knicks	27	23	.540	6.0	50
9	Charlotte Hornets	26	24	.520	7.0	50
10	Toronto Raptors	23	27	.460	10.0	50
11	Cleveland Cavaliers	22	28	.440	11.0	50
12	Boston Celtics	19	31	.380	14.0	50
13	Washington Wizards	18	32	.360	15.0	50
14	New Jersey Nets	16	34	.320	17.0	50
15	Chicago Bulls	13	37	.260	20.0	50

z – clinched division title
y – clinched division title
x – clinched playoff spot

== Player statistics ==
=== Regular season ===
Legend
GP	Games played	GS	Games started	MPG	Minutes per game
FG%	Field-goal percentage	3P%	3-point field-goal percentage	FT%	Free-throw percentage
RPG	Rebounds per game	APG	Assists per game	SPG	Steals per game
BPG	Blocks per game	PPG	Points per game

New Jersey Nets statistics
Player	GP	GS	MPG	FG%	3P%	FT%	RPG	APG	SPG	BPG	PPG
Stephon Marbury	31	31	39.8	.439	.367	.832	2.6	8.7	1.0	0.1	23.4
Keith Van Horn	42	42	37.5	.428	.302	.859	8.5	1.5	1.0	1.3	21.8
Sam Cassell	4	3	25.0	.429	.143	.935	1.5	4.8	0.8	0.0	18.0
Kerry Kittles	46	40	34.1	.370	.316	.772	4.2	2.5	1.7	0.6	12.9
Kendall Gill	50	47	32.1	.398	.118	.683	4.9	2.5	2.7	0.5	11.8
Jayson Williams	30	30	34.0	.445	.000	.565	12.0	1.1	0.8	2.0	8.1
Doug Overton	8	1	21.8	.439	.500	.857	2.1	2.0	0.4	0.1	8.0
Eric Murdock	15	8	26.7	.395	.364	.808	2.3	4.4	1.5	0.1	7.9
Jamie Feick	26	16	32.7	.504		.717	11.0	0.9	1.0	0.7	6.8
Scott Burrell	32	10	22.1	.361	.389	.810	3.7	1.4	1.3	0.3	6.6
Chris Carr	28	2	13.0	.374	.379	.694	2.1	0.6	0.3	0.0	6.6
Mark Hendrickson	22	6	18.1	.443	.000	.840	3.1	0.6	0.5	0.0	5.5
Lucious Harris	36	5	16.7	.403	.220	.750	1.9	0.9	0.5	0.2	5.4
Chris Gatling	18	2	15.6	.371	.000	.500	3.6	0.7	0.4	0.2	4.7
Damon Jones	11	0	11.9	.318	.345	.846	1.2	1.2	0.6	0.0	4.5
Earl Boykins	5	0	10.2	.476	.200		0.8	1.2	0.2	0.0	4.2
David Vaughn	10	0	10.3	.542		.800	3.4	0.1	0.2	0.8	3.4
Brian Evans	11	0	11.0	.324	.364	1.000	1.5	1.3	0.3	0.3	2.7
Elliot Perry	30	0	8.1	.349	.391	.750	0.9	1.2	0.5	0.0	2.6
Jim McIlvaine	22	1	12.2	.431		.667	2.5	0.1	0.4	1.5	2.2
Rony Seikaly	9	0	9.8	.200		.389	2.3	0.2	0.4	0.7	1.7
William Cunningham	15	6	10.7	.167		.000	1.9	0.1	0.1	0.7	0.4
Gheorghe Muresan	1	0	1.0	.000			0.0	0.0	0.0	0.0	0.0

Player statistics citation:

== See also ==
- 1998–99 NBA season
