= 1998–99 Boston Celtics season =

NBA basketball team season

- Head coach: Rick Pitino
- General manager: Rick Pitino
- Owner: Paul Gaston
- Arena: Fleet Center

Results
- Record: 19–31 (.380)
- Place: Division: 5th (Atlantic); Conference: 12th (Eastern)
- Playoff finish: Did not qualify
- Stats at Basketball Reference

Local media
- Television: WABU (Tom Heinsohn, Bob Cousy); Fox Sports New England (Mike Gorman, Tom Heinsohn)
- Radio: WEEI (Howard David, Cedric Maxwell)

The 1998–99 Boston Celtics season was the 53rd season for the Boston Celtics in the National Basketball Association. Due to a lockout, the regular season began on February 5, 1999, and was cut from 82 games to 50.

== Season summary ==
=== Off-season ===
This season was most memorable when the Celtics received the tenth overall pick in the 1998 NBA draft, and selected small forward Paul Pierce from the University of Kansas. During the off-season, the team acquired second-year center Tony Battie from the Los Angeles Lakers, who had acquired him from the Denver Nuggets on draft day.

=== Regular season ===
With the addition of Pierce and Battie, the Celtics got off to a 6–5 start to the regular season. However, the team struggled and fell below .500 in winning percentage losing 12 of their next 14 games. At mid-season, the team traded Andrew DeClercq to the Cleveland Cavaliers in exchange for Vitaly Potapenko. Celtics fans began to get restless with head coach Rick Pitino's slow growth, as the team finished in fifth place in the Atlantic Division with a 19–31 record.

Antoine Walker averaged 18.7 points, 8.5 rebounds and 1.5 steals per game, and also contributed 65 three-point field goals, while second-year star Ron Mercer averaged 17.0 points and 1.6 steals per game, and Pierce provided the team with 16.5 points, 6.4 rebounds and 1.7 steals per game, led them with 84 three-point field goals, and was named to the NBA All-Rookie First Team. In addition, Kenny Anderson contributed 12.1 points and 5.7 assists per game, while Potapenko provided with 10.8 points and 7.2 rebounds per game in 33 games after the trade. Off the bench, sixth man Dana Barros contributed 9.3 points and 4.2 assists per game, while Battie averaged 6.7 points, 6.0 rebounds and 1.4 blocks per game, Walter McCarty provided with 5.7 points and 3.6 rebounds per game, and Greg Minor contributed 4.9 points per game.

Pierce finished in third place in Rookie of the Year voting. The Celtics finished ninth in the NBA in home-game attendance, with an attendance of 440,602 at the FleetCenter during the regular season.

=== Aftermath ===
Following the season, Mercer and Popeye Jones were both traded to the Denver Nuggets, and Bruce Bowen signed as a free agent with the Philadelphia 76ers.

== Draft picks ==
Round	Pick	Player	Position	Nationality	College
1	10	Paul Pierce	SF/SG	United States	Kansas

== Roster ==
1998–99 Boston Celtics roster
Players

Pos.	No.	Player	Height	Weight	DOB	From
G	7	Kenny Anderson	6 ft 0 in (1.83 m)	168 lb (76 kg)	1970–10–09	Georgia Tech
G	11	Dana Barros	5 ft 11 in (1.80 m)	163 lb (74 kg)	1967–04–13	Boston College
F/C	40	Tony Battie	6 ft 11 in (2.11 m)	230 lb (104 kg)	1976–02–11	Texas Tech
G/F	12	Bruce Bowen	6 ft 7 in (2.01 m)	185 lb (84 kg)	1971–06–14	Cal State Fullerton
F	29	Pervis Ellison (IN)	6 ft 9 in (2.06 m)	210 lb (95 kg)	1967–04–03	Louisville
G	13	Damon Jones	6 ft 3 in (1.91 m)	185 lb (84 kg)	1976–08–25	Houston
F	4	Popeye Jones	6 ft 8 in (2.03 m)	250 lb (113 kg)	1970–06–17	Murray State
F	0	Walter McCarty	6 ft 10 in (2.08 m)	230 lb (104 kg)	1974–02–01	Kentucky
G	5	Ron Mercer	6 ft 7 in (2.01 m)	210 lb (95 kg)	1976–05–18	Kentucky
G	9	Greg Minor	6 ft 6 in (1.98 m)	210 lb (95 kg)	1971–09–18	Louisville
F	34	Paul Pierce	6 ft 7 in (2.01 m)	235 lb (107 kg)	1977–10–13	Kansas
C	52	Vitaly Potapenko	6 ft 10 in (2.08 m)	280 lb (127 kg)	1975–03–21	Wright State
C	44	Eric Riley	7 ft 0 in (2.13 m)	245 lb (111 kg)	1970–06–02	Michigan
C	55	Dwayne Schintzius	7 ft 1 in (2.16 m)	260 lb (118 kg)	1968–10–14	Florida
F	8	Antoine Walker	6 ft 8 in (2.03 m)	224 lb (102 kg)	1976–08–12	Kentucky

Coaches
Head coach
- Rick Pitino
Assistant(s)
- John Carroll
- Lester Conner
- Andy Enfield
- Jim O'Brien

Legend
- (DP) Unsigned draft pick
- (FA) Free agent
- (S) Suspended
- (IN) Inactive
- Injured

Roster
Updated: May 4, 1999

=== Roster Notes ===
- Power forward Pervis Ellison was on the injured reserve list due to an ankle injury, and missed the entire regular season.

== Regular season ==
=== Season standings ===
Atlantic Division	W	L	PCT	GB	Home	Road	Div	GP
c-Miami Heat	33	17	.660	–	18‍–‍7	15‍–‍10	12–8	50
x-Orlando Magic	33	17	.660	–	21‍–‍4	12‍–‍13	12–6	50
x-Philadelphia 76ers	28	22	.560	5.0	17‍–‍8	11‍–‍14	9–10	50
x-New York Knicks	27	23	.540	6.0	19‍–‍6	8‍–‍17	12–8	50
Boston Celtics	19	31	.380	14.0	10‍–‍15	9‍–‍16	10–9	50
Washington Wizards	18	32	.360	15.0	13‍–‍12	5‍–‍20	6–13	50
New Jersey Nets	16	34	.320	17.0	12‍–‍13	4‍–‍21	6–13	50

Eastern Conference
#	Team	W	L	PCT	GB	GP
1	c-Miami Heat *	33	17	.660	–	50
2	y-Indiana Pacers *	33	17	.660	–	50
3	x-Orlando Magic	33	17	.660	–	50
4	x-Atlanta Hawks	31	19	.620	2.0	50
5	x-Detroit Pistons	29	21	.580	4.0	50
6	x-Philadelphia 76ers	28	22	.560	5.0	50
7	x-Milwaukee Bucks	28	22	.560	5.0	50
8	x-New York Knicks	27	23	.540	6.0	50
9	Charlotte Hornets	26	24	.520	7.0	50
10	Toronto Raptors	23	27	.460	10.0	50
11	Cleveland Cavaliers	22	28	.440	11.0	50
12	Boston Celtics	19	31	.380	14.0	50
13	Washington Wizards	18	32	.360	15.0	50
14	New Jersey Nets	16	34	.320	17.0	50
15	Chicago Bulls	13	37	.260	20.0	50

z - clinched division title
y - clinched division title
x - clinched playoff spot

== Player statistics ==
Legend
GP	Games played	GS	Games started	MPG	Minutes per game
FG%	Field-goal percentage	3P%	3-point field-goal percentage	FT%	Free-throw percentage
RPG	Rebounds per game	APG	Assists per game	SPG	Steals per game
BPG	Blocks per game	PPG	Points per game

=== Regular season ===
Boston Celtics statistics
Player	GP	GS	MPG	FG%	3P%	FT%	RPG	APG	SPG	BPG	PPG
Kenny Anderson	34	33	29.7	.451	.250	.832	3.0	5.7	1.0	.1	12.1
Dana Barros	50	16	23.1	.453	.400	.877	2.1	4.2	1.0	.1	9.3
Tony Battie	50	15	22.4	.519	.000	.672	6.0	1.1	.6	1.4	6.7
Bruce Bowen	30	1	16.5	.280	.269	.458	1.7	.9	.7	.3	2.3
Andrew DeClercq^{†}	14	1	18.4	.491		.655	4.5	.7	.9	.6	5.4
Marlon Garnett	24	0	8.5	.294	.261	.750	.9	.8	.2	.0	2.1
Damon Jones^{†}	13	0	16.4	.387	.455	.750	2.4	2.2	.5	.0	5.8
Popeye Jones	18	2	11.4	.392	.000	.824	2.9	.8	.3	.0	3.0
Walter McCarty	32	4	20.6	.362	.260	.702	3.6	1.3	.8	.4	5.7
Ron Mercer	41	40	37.8	.431	.167	.790	3.8	2.5	1.6	.3	17.0
Greg Minor	44	7	17.4	.417	.286	.750	2.7	1.1	.5	.1	4.9
Paul Pierce	48	47	34.0	.439	.412	.713	6.4	2.4	1.7	1.0	16.5
Vitaly Potapenko^{†}	33	32	28.1	.521		.547	7.2	1.8	.7	.6	10.8
Eric Riley	35	11	9.6	.519		.710	2.8	.4	.3	.7	2.2
Dwayne Schintzius	16	0	4.2	.250		.750	1.2	.5	.0	.2	.7
Antoine Walker	42	41	36.9	.412	.369	.559	8.5	3.1	1.5	.7	18.7

- ^{†} Denotes player spent time with another team in the season. Stats reflect time with the Celtics only.

Player statistics citation:

== Awards and records ==
- Paul Pierce, NBA All-Rookie Team 1st Team

== See also ==
- 1998–99 NBA season
