= 1998–99 Philadelphia 76ers season =

NBA professional basketball team season

- Head coach: Larry Brown
- General manager: Billy King
- Owners: Comcast Spectacor
- Arena: First Union Center

Results
- Record: 28–22 (.560)
- Place: Division: 3rd (Atlantic); Conference: 6th (Eastern)
- Playoff finish: Conference semifinals (lost to Pacers 0–4)
- Stats at Basketball Reference

Local media
- Television: WPSG; CSN Philadelphia
- Radio: WIP

The 1998–99 Philadelphia 76ers season was the 50th season for the Philadelphia 76ers in the National Basketball Association, and their 36th season in Philadelphia, Pennsylvania. Due to a lockout, the regular season began on February 5, 1999, and was cut from 82 games to 50.

== Season summary ==
=== Off-season ===
The 76ers received the eighth overall pick in the 1998 NBA draft, and selected shooting guard Larry Hughes out of Saint Louis University. During the off-season, the team signed free agents Matt Geiger, George Lynch and Harvey Grant, and later on re-signed former 76ers forward Rick Mahorn in late February.

=== Regular season ===
With the addition of Hughes, Geiger and Lynch, the 76ers won their first three games of the regular season, but then lost five of their next six games falling below .500 in winning percentage. However, the team soon recovered and posted a six-game winning streak between February and March. At mid-season, the 76ers traded second-year forward Tim Thomas, and Scott Williams to the Milwaukee Bucks in exchange for Tyrone Hill, and second-year forward Jerald Honeycutt. The 76ers won 9 of their final 13 games of the season, and finished in third place in the Atlantic Division with a 28–22 record, earning the sixth seed in the Eastern Conference; the team qualified for the NBA playoffs for the first time since the 1990–91 season, ending a seven-year playoff drought.

After playing point guard for the previous two seasons, Allen Iverson switched to the shooting guard position, and led the league in scoring averaging 26.8 points, 4.6 assists and 2.3 steals per game, and was named to the All-NBA First Team. In addition, Geiger averaged 13.5 points and 7.2 rebounds per game, while Theo Ratliff provided the team with 11.2 points, 8.1 rebounds and 3.0 blocks per game, and was named to the NBA All-Defensive Second Team, and Hughes contributed 9.1 points per game off the bench. Meanwhile, Eric Snow became the team's starting point guard, averaging 8.6 points, 6.3 assists and 2.1 steals per game, Hill contributed 8.5 points and 7.3 rebounds per game in 21 games after the trade, Lynch averaged 8.3 points, 6.5 rebounds and 2.0 steals per game, Aaron McKie provided with 4.8 points and 1.3 steals per game, and Grant contributed 3.1 points per game.

Iverson finished in fourth place in Most Valuable Player voting, while Ratliff finished tied in fifth place in Defensive Player of the Year voting; Snow finished in second place in Most Improved Player voting behind Darrell Armstrong of the Orlando Magic, while Ratliff finished in sixth place, and head coach Larry Brown finished in second place in Coach of the Year voting, behind Mike Dunleavy of the Portland Trail Blazers. The 76ers finished eleventh in the NBA in home-game attendance, with an attendance of 436,444 at the First Union Center during the regular season.

=== NBA playoffs ===
In the Eastern Conference First Round of the 1999 NBA playoffs, the 76ers faced off against the 3rd–seeded Magic, a team that featured All-Star guard Penny Hardaway, Nick Anderson, and Armstrong, who was named both Sixth Man, and Most Improved Player of the Year. It was Iverson's first ever NBA playoff appearance. The 76ers won Game 1 over the Magic on the road, 104–90 at the Orlando Arena, but then lost Game 2 on the road, 79–68 as the Magic evened the series. One notable highlight of the series occurred in Game 3 at the First Union Center, in which Iverson set an NBA playoff record of ten steals in a single game, as the 76ers defeated the Magic by a score of 97–85. The 76ers won Game 4 over the Magic at home, 101–91 to win the series in four games.

In the Eastern Conference Semi-finals, the team faced off against the 2nd–seeded, and Central Division champion Indiana Pacers, who were led by All-Star guard Reggie Miller, All-Star center Rik Smits, and sixth man Jalen Rose. The 76ers lost the first two games to the Pacers on the road at the Market Square Arena, and then lost the next two games at home, including a Game 4 loss to the Pacers at the First Union Center, 89–86, thus losing the series in a four-game sweep.

=== Aftermath ===
Following the season, Grant and second-year guard Anthony Parker were both traded to the Orlando Magic, who released Grant to free agency, while Honeycutt was released to free agency, and Mahorn retired after playing in his second stint with the 76ers.

== Offseason ==
=== Draft picks ===
Round	Pick	Player	Position	Nationality	College
1	8	Larry Hughes	SG	United States	Saint Louis University
2	37	Casey Shaw	C	United States	University of Toledo

== Roster ==
1998–99 Philadelphia 76ers roster
Players

Pos.	No.	Player	Height	Weight	DOB	From
C	52	Matt Geiger	7 ft 0 in (2.13 m)	243 lb (110 kg)	1969–09–10	Georgia Tech
F	44	Harvey Grant	6 ft 8 in (2.03 m)	195 lb (88 kg)	1965–07–04	Oklahoma
F	40	Tyrone Hill	6 ft 9 in (2.06 m)	240 lb (109 kg)	1968–03–19	Xavier
F	25	Jerald Honeycutt	6 ft 9 in (2.06 m)	245 lb (111 kg)	1974–10–20	Tulane
G	21	Larry Hughes	6 ft 5 in (1.96 m)	184 lb (83 kg)	1979–01–23	Saint Louis
G	3	Allen Iverson	6 ft 0 in (1.83 m)	165 lb (75 kg)	1975–06–07	Georgetown
F	9	George Lynch	6 ft 8 in (2.03 m)	218 lb (99 kg)	1970–09–03	North Carolina
F/C	4	Rick Mahorn	6 ft 10 in (2.08 m)	240 lb (109 kg)	1958–09–21	Hampton
G/F	8	Aaron McKie	6 ft 5 in (1.96 m)	209 lb (95 kg)	1972–10–02	Temple
F/C	14	Nazr Mohammed	6 ft 10 in (2.08 m)	221 lb (100 kg)	1977–09–05	Kentucky
G	11	Doug Overton	6 ft 3 in (1.91 m)	190 lb (86 kg)	1969–08–03	La Salle
G	12	Anthony Parker	6 ft 6 in (1.98 m)	215 lb (98 kg)	1975–06–19	Bradley
F/C	42	Theo Ratliff	6 ft 10 in (2.08 m)	225 lb (102 kg)	1973–04–17	Wyoming
C	30	Casey Shaw	6 ft 11 in (2.11 m)	230 lb (104 kg)	1975–07–20	Toledo
G	20	Eric Snow	6 ft 3 in (1.91 m)	190 lb (86 kg)	1973–04–24	Michigan State

Coaches
Head coach
- Larry Brown
Assistant(s)
- Maurice Cheeks
- John Kuester

Legend
- (DP) Unsigned draft pick
- (FA) Free agent
- (S) Suspended
- Injured

Roster
Updated: April 16, 1999

== Regular season ==
=== Season standings ===
Atlantic Division	W	L	PCT	GB	Home	Road	Div	GP
c-Miami Heat	33	17	.660	–	18‍–‍7	15‍–‍10	12–8	50
x-Orlando Magic	33	17	.660	–	21‍–‍4	12‍–‍13	12–6	50
x-Philadelphia 76ers	28	22	.560	5.0	17‍–‍8	11‍–‍14	9–10	50
x-New York Knicks	27	23	.540	6.0	19‍–‍6	8‍–‍17	12–8	50
Boston Celtics	19	31	.380	14.0	10‍–‍15	9‍–‍16	10–9	50
Washington Wizards	18	32	.360	15.0	13‍–‍12	5‍–‍20	6–13	50
New Jersey Nets	16	34	.320	17.0	12‍–‍13	4‍–‍21	6–13	50

Eastern Conference
#	Team	W	L	PCT	GB	GP
1	c-Miami Heat *	33	17	.660	–	50
2	y-Indiana Pacers *	33	17	.660	–	50
3	x-Orlando Magic	33	17	.660	–	50
4	x-Atlanta Hawks	31	19	.620	2.0	50
5	x-Detroit Pistons	29	21	.580	4.0	50
6	x-Philadelphia 76ers	28	22	.560	5.0	50
7	x-Milwaukee Bucks	28	22	.560	5.0	50
8	x-New York Knicks	27	23	.540	6.0	50
9	Charlotte Hornets	26	24	.520	7.0	50
10	Toronto Raptors	23	27	.460	10.0	50
11	Cleveland Cavaliers	22	28	.440	11.0	50
12	Boston Celtics	19	31	.380	14.0	50
13	Washington Wizards	18	32	.360	15.0	50
14	New Jersey Nets	16	34	.320	17.0	50
15	Chicago Bulls	13	37	.260	20.0	50

z – clinched division title
y – clinched division title
x – clinched playoff spot

== Playoffs ==
1999 playoff game log
First Round: 3–1 (home: 2–0; road: 1–1)

Game	Date	Team	Score	High points	High rebounds	High assists	Location Attendance	Series
1	May 9	@ Orlando	W 104–90	Allen Iverson (30)	George Lynch (12)	Allen Iverson (7)	Orlando Arena; 15,267	1–0
2	May 11	@ Orlando	L 68–79	Allen Iverson (13)	Theo Ratliff (8)	George Lynch (6)	Orlando Arena; 16,345	1–1
3	May 13	Orlando	W 97–85	Allen Iverson (33)	Tyrone Hill (9)	Eric Snow (8)	First Union Center; 20,874	2–1
4	May 15	Orlando	W 101–91	Allen Iverson (37)	George Lynch (10)	Allen Iverson (9)	First Union Center; 20,550	3–1

Conference semifinals: 0–4 (home: 0–2; road: 0–2)

Game	Date	Team	Score	High points	High rebounds	High assists	Location Attendance	Series
1	May 17	@ Indiana	L 90–94	Allen Iverson (35)	Matt Geiger (11)	Eric Snow (10)	Market Square Arena; 16,723	0–1
2	May 19	@ Indiana	L 82–85	Allen Iverson (23)	Theo Ratliff (12)	Eric Snow (6)	Market Square Arena; 16,795	0–2
3	May 21	Indiana	L 86–97	Allen Iverson (32)	Tyrone Hill (12)	Eric Snow (9)	First Union Center; 20,930	0–3
4	May 23	Indiana	L 86–89	Allen Iverson (25)	Matt Geiger (13)	Eric Snow (7)	First Union Center; 20,844	0–4

1999 schedule

== Player statistics ==
Legend
GP	Games played	GS	Games started	MPG	Minutes per game
FG%	Field-goal percentage	3P%	3-point field-goal percentage	FT%	Free-throw percentage
RPG	Rebounds per game	APG	Assists per game	SPG	Steals per game
BPG	Blocks per game	PPG	Points per game

=== Regular season ===
Player	GP	GS	MPG	FG%	3P%	FT%	RPG	APG	SPG	BPG	PPG
Benoit Benjamin	6	0	5.5	.286			1.3	.2	.0	.0	.7
Matt Geiger	50	40	30.8	.479	.200	.797	7.2	1.2	.8	.8	13.5
Harvey Grant	47	10	17.0	.369	.167	.724	2.3	.5	.4	.3	3.1
Tyrone Hill^{†}	21	6	28.0	.480		.507	7.3	.9	.8	.4	8.5
Jerald Honeycutt^{†}	13	0	6.9	.259	.357	.750	.8	.2	.3	.2	1.9
Larry Hughes	50	1	19.8	.411	.154	.709	3.8	1.5	.9	.3	9.1
Allen Iverson	48	48	41.5	.412	.291	.751	4.9	4.6	2.3	.1	26.8
George Lynch	43	43	30.6	.421	.391	.631	6.5	1.8	2.0	.5	8.3
Rick Mahorn	16	0	7.9	.278		.375	1.4	.1	.3	.1	.8
Aaron McKie	50	4	19.2	.401	.194	.710	2.8	2.0	1.3	.1	4.8
Nazr Mohammed	26	0	4.7	.357		.571	1.4	.1	.2	.2	1.6
Doug Overton^{†}	10	0	3.7	.333	.000		.2	.4	.1	.0	1.0
Anthony Parker	2	0	1.5	1.000			.0	.0	.0	.0	1.0
Theo Ratliff	50	50	32.5	.470		.725	8.1	.6	.9	3.0	11.2
Casey Shaw	9	0	1.6	.125			.3	.0	.0	.0	.2
Eric Snow	48	48	35.8	.428	.238	.733	3.4	6.3	2.1	.0	8.6
Tim Thomas^{†}	17	0	11.1	.403	.263	.792	1.9	.9	.2	.2	4.6
Scott Williams^{†}	2	0	8.5	.000			1.0	.5	1.0	.5	.0

=== Playoffs ===
Player	GP	GS	MPG	FG%	3P%	FT%	RPG	APG	SPG	BPG	PPG
Matt Geiger	8	8	29.9	.438	.000	.828	7.6	.8	1.1	.8	13.5
Harvey Grant	4	0	7.3	1.000			1.0	.0	.0	.3	.5
Tyrone Hill	8	1	24.5	.487		.368	7.4	.0	.4	.3	5.6
Jerald Honeycutt	6	0	2.0	.200	.000		.2	.0	.0	.0	.3
Larry Hughes	8	2	24.8	.403	.000	.833	4.6	2.0	1.9	1.1	10.3
Allen Iverson	8	8	44.8	.411	.283	.712	4.1	4.9	2.5	.3	28.5
George Lynch	8	6	31.1	.446	.333	.706	6.6	2.0	2.3	.3	9.0
Rick Mahorn	5	0	5.8	.333		.500	1.6	.2	.2	.0	1.0
Aaron McKie	6	0	16.2	.304	.000	.857	2.5	1.8	.7	.0	3.3
Nazr Mohammed	3	0	1.0				.0	.0	.0	.0	.0
Theo Ratliff	7	7	29.1	.465		.579	7.3	.9	.7	2.6	7.3
Eric Snow	8	8	38.3	.420	.231	.815	4.1	7.1	1.0	.1	12.4

- ^{†} Denotes player spent time with another team in the season. Stats reflect time with the 7ers only.

Player statistics citation:

== Awards and records ==
- Allen Iverson, All-NBA First Team
- Theo Ratliff, NBA All-Defensive Second Team

== See also ==
- 1998–99 NBA season
