= 1998–99 Detroit Pistons season =

NBA team season

- Head coach: Alvin Gentry
- General manager: Rick Sund
- Owner: Bill Davidson
- Arena: The Palace of Auburn Hills

Results
- Record: 29–21 (.580)
- Place: Division: 3rd (Central); Conference: 5th (Eastern)
- Playoff finish: First round (lost to Hawks 2–3)
- Stats at Basketball Reference

Local media
- Television: WKBD-TV (George Blaha, Kelly Tripucka); Fox Sports Detroit (Fred McLeod, Greg Kelser)
- Radio: WDFN (George Blaha)

The 1998–99 Detroit Pistons season was the 51st season for the Detroit Pistons in the National Basketball Association, and their 42nd season in Detroit, Michigan. Due to a lockout, the regular season began on February 5, 1999, and was cut from 82 games to 50.

== Season summary ==
=== Off-season ===
The Pistons received the eleventh overall pick in the 1998 NBA draft, and selected shooting guard Bonzi Wells out of Ball State University, but later on traded him to the Portland Trail Blazers. During the off-season, the team acquired Christian Laettner from the Atlanta Hawks, and signed free agents Loy Vaught, and Jud Buechler. Laettner would reunite with former Duke University teammate Grant Hill, but only played just 16 games due to an Achilles injury and a broken rib. After a solid year the previous season, Brian Williams changed his named to Bison Dele to honor his Cherokee heritage.

=== Regular season ===
The Pistons won their first three games of the regular season, but then posted a five-game losing streak afterwards. However, the team soon posted a six-game winning streak between February and March, posted another six-game winning streak between March and April, and another six-game winning streak between April and May. The Pistons finished in third place in the Central Division with a 29–21 record, earning the fifth seed in the Eastern Conference, and returning to the NBA playoffs after a one-year absence.

Hill averaged 21.1 points, 7.1 rebounds, 6.0 assists and 1.6 steals per game, and was named to the All-NBA Second Team, while sixth man Jerry Stackhouse continued to provide scoring off the bench, averaging 14.5 points per game, but struggled shooting .371 in field-goal percentage. In addition, Lindsey Hunter provided the team with 11.9 points, 3.9 assists and 1.8 steals per game, while Joe Dumars contributed 11.3 points and 3.5 assists per game, and led the Pistons with 89 three-point field goals, and Dele averaged 10.5 points and 5.6 rebounds per game. Off the bench, Laettner averaged 7.6 points and 3.4 rebounds per game, while Jerome Williams provided with 7.0 points and 7.1 rebounds per game, Buechler contributed 5.5 points per game, and starting power forward Don Reid averaged 5.1 points and 3.6 rebounds per game.

Hill finished in eighth place in Most Valuable Player voting. The Pistons finished eighth in the NBA in home-game attendance, with an attendance of 444,585 at The Palace of Auburn Hills during the regular season.

=== NBA playoffs ===
In the Eastern Conference First Round of the 1999 NBA playoffs, the Pistons faced off against the 4th–seeded Atlanta Hawks, who were led by All-Star center Dikembe Mutombo, All-Star guard Steve Smith, and Mookie Blaylock. The Pistons lost the first two games to the Hawks on the road at the Georgia Dome, but managed to win the next two games at home, which included a Game 4 win over the Hawks at The Palace of Auburn Hills, 103–82 to even the series. However, the Pistons lost Game 5 to the Hawks at the Alexander Memorial Coliseum, 87–75, thus losing in a hard-fought five-game series; Game 5 of the series was played at the Alexander Memorial Coliseum, because the Georgia Dome was booked for a concert.

=== Aftermath ===
This season also marked an end of an era, as Dumars retired after a solid fourteen-year NBA career with the Pistons, and would become the team's vice president the following season. This was also Dele's final season of his NBA career, as he retired before the following season, turning down a $36 million contract.

== Draft picks ==
| Round | Pick | Player | Position | Nationality | College |
|---|---|---|---|---|---|
| 1 | 11 | Bonzi Wells | SG | United States | Ball State |
| 2 | 40 | Korleone Young | SF | United States | |

== Roster ==
1998–99 Detroit Pistons roster
Players

| Pos. | No. | Player | Height | Weight | DOB | From |
|---|---|---|---|---|---|---|
| G/F | 30 | Jud Buechler | 6 ft 6 in (1.98 m) | 220 lb (100 kg) | 1968–06–19 | Arizona |
| C | 8 | Bison Dele | 6 ft 11 in (2.11 m) | 260 lb (118 kg) | 1969–04–06 | Arizona |
| G | 4 | Joe Dumars | 6 ft 3 in (1.91 m) | 190 lb (86 kg) | 1963–05–24 | McNeese State |
| F | 33 | Grant Hill | 6 ft 8 in (2.03 m) | 225 lb (102 kg) | 1972–10–05 | Duke |
| G | 1 | Lindsey Hunter | 6 ft 2 in (1.88 m) | 170 lb (77 kg) | 1970–12–03 | Jackson State |
| F/C | 32 | Christian Laettner | 6 ft 11 in (2.11 m) | 235 lb (107 kg) | 1969–08–17 | Duke |
| C | 00 | Eric Montross | 7 ft 0 in (2.13 m) | 270 lb (122 kg) | 1971–09–23 | North Carolina |
| G | 5 | Charles O'Bannon | 6 ft 5 in (1.96 m) | 209 lb (95 kg) | 1975–02–22 | UCLA |
| G | 20 | Khalid Reeves | 6 ft 3 in (1.91 m) | 199 lb (90 kg) | 1972–07–15 | Arizona |
| F/C | 52 | Don Reid | 6 ft 8 in (2.03 m) | 250 lb (113 kg) | 1973–12–30 | Georgetown |
| G | 42 | Jerry Stackhouse | 6 ft 6 in (1.98 m) | 218 lb (99 kg) | 1974–11–05 | North Carolina |
| F/C | 35 | Loy Vaught | 6 ft 9 in (2.06 m) | 230 lb (104 kg) | 1968–02–27 | Michigan |
| F | 13 | Jerome Williams | 6 ft 9 in (2.06 m) | 206 lb (93 kg) | 1973–05–10 | Georgetown |
| F | 45 | Korleone Young | 6 ft 7 in (2.01 m) | 213 lb (97 kg) | 1978–12–31 | Hargrave Military Academy (VA) |

Coaches
Head coach
- Alvin Gentry
Assistant(s)
- John Hammond
- Gar Heard
- Bob Ociepka
- Mike Abdenour (trainer)

Legend
- (DP) Unsigned draft pick
- (FA) Free agent
- (S) Suspended
- Injured

Roster
Updated: April 3, 1999

== Regular season ==
=== Season standings ===
| Central Division | W | L | PCT | GB | Home | Road | Div | GP |
|---|---|---|---|---|---|---|---|---|
| y-Indiana Pacers | 33 | 17 | .660 | – | 18‍–‍7 | 15‍–‍10 | 15–7 | 50 |
| x-Atlanta Hawks | 31 | 19 | .620 | 2.0 | 16‍–‍9 | 15‍–‍10 | 15–8 | 50 |
| x-Detroit Pistons | 29 | 21 | .580 | 4.0 | 17‍–‍8 | 12‍–‍13 | 13–8 | 50 |
| x-Milwaukee Bucks | 28 | 22 | .560 | 5.0 | 17‍–‍8 | 11‍–‍14 | 13–11 | 50 |
| Charlotte Hornets | 26 | 24 | .520 | 7.0 | 16‍–‍9 | 10‍–‍15 | 12–10 | 50 |
| Toronto Raptors | 23 | 27 | .460 | 10.0 | 14‍–‍11 | 9‍–‍16 | 9–14 | 50 |
| Cleveland Cavaliers | 22 | 28 | .440 | 11.0 | 15‍–‍10 | 7‍–‍18 | 9–13 | 50 |
| Chicago Bulls | 13 | 37 | .260 | 20.0 | 8‍–‍17 | 5‍–‍20 | 4–19 | 50 |

Eastern Conference
| # | Team | W | L | PCT | GB | GP |
|---|---|---|---|---|---|---|
| 1 | c-Miami Heat * | 33 | 17 | .660 | – | 50 |
| 2 | y-Indiana Pacers * | 33 | 17 | .660 | – | 50 |
| 3 | x-Orlando Magic | 33 | 17 | .660 | – | 50 |
| 4 | x-Atlanta Hawks | 31 | 19 | .620 | 2.0 | 50 |
| 5 | x-Detroit Pistons | 29 | 21 | .580 | 4.0 | 50 |
| 6 | x-Philadelphia 76ers | 28 | 22 | .560 | 5.0 | 50 |
| 7 | x-Milwaukee Bucks | 28 | 22 | .560 | 5.0 | 50 |
| 8 | x-New York Knicks | 27 | 23 | .540 | 6.0 | 50 |
| 9 | Charlotte Hornets | 26 | 24 | .520 | 7.0 | 50 |
| 10 | Toronto Raptors | 23 | 27 | .460 | 10.0 | 50 |
| 11 | Cleveland Cavaliers | 22 | 28 | .440 | 11.0 | 50 |
| 12 | Boston Celtics | 19 | 31 | .380 | 14.0 | 50 |
| 13 | Washington Wizards | 18 | 32 | .360 | 15.0 | 50 |
| 14 | New Jersey Nets | 16 | 34 | .320 | 17.0 | 50 |
| 15 | Chicago Bulls | 13 | 37 | .260 | 20.0 | 50 |

c - clinched homecourt advantage
y - clinched division title
x - clinched playoff spot

=== Game log ===
1998–99 game log
Total: 29-21 (Home: 17–8; Road: 12–13)
February: 8–6 (home: 6–2; road: 2–4)

| Game | Date | Team | Score | High points | High rebounds | High assists | Location Attendance | Record |
|---|---|---|---|---|---|---|---|---|
| 1 | February 5 | @ Miami | W 95–81 | Jerry Stackhouse (24) | Jerome Williams (11) | Lindsey Hunter (5) | Miami Arena; 15,200 | 1–0 |
| 2 | February 7 | Indiana | W 107–98 | Grant Hill (26) | Eric Montross (14) | Joe Dumars (6) | The Palace Of Auburn Hills; 18,877 | 2–0 |
| 3 | February 8 | Washington | W 106–103 | Grant Hill (46) | Hill & Stackhouse (7) | Lindsey Hunter (8) | The Palace Of Auburn Hills; 14,210 | 3–0 |
| 4 | February 9 | @ Philadelphia | L 86–90 | Grant Hill (32) | Bison Dele (12) | Lindsey Hunter (4) | First Union Center; 15,871 | 3–1 |
| 5 | February 11 | Orlando | L 81–87 | Grant Hill (25) | Bison Dele (12) | Grant Hill (7) | The Palace Of Auburn Hills; 17,783 | 3–2 |
| 6 | February 15 | @ New York | L 69–78 | Grant Hill (31) | Bison Dele (10) | Jerry Stackhouse (7) | Madison Square Garden; 19,763 | 3–3 |
| 7 | February 16 | @ New Jersey | L 82–97 | Grant Hill (22) | Jerome Williams (8) | Jerry Stackhouse (3) | Continental Airlines Arena; 15,633 | 3–4 |
| 8 | February 17 | Miami | L 80–91 | Grant Hill (22) | Jerome Williams (14) | Grant Hill (3) | The Palace Of Auburn Hills; 17,225 | 3–5 |
| 9 | February 19 | @ Phoenix | W 101–93 | Jerry Stackhouse (23) | Bison Dele (11) | Jerry Stackhouse (10) | America West Arena; 19,023 | 4–5 |
| 10 | February 21 | @ San Antonio | L 64–85 | Grant Hill (16) | Williams & Dele (9) | Grant Hill (4) | Alamodome; 19,495 | 4–6 |
| 11 | February 23 | Toronto | W 106–80 | Jerry Stackhouse (18) | Grant Hill (9) | Grant Hill (10) | The Palace Of Auburn Hills; 14,187 | 5–6 |
| 12 | February 24 | Cleveland | W 89–73 | Joe Dumars (26) | Dele & Reid (8) | Grant Hill (11) | The Palace Of Auburn Hills; 13,271 | 6–6 |
| 13 | February 26 | Miami | W 95–93 | Grant Hill (22) | Grant Hill (10) | Grant Hill (8) | The Palace Of Auburn Hills; 20,083 | 7–6 |
| 14 | February 28 | New York | W 89–68 | Joe Dumars (21) | Grant Hill (11) | Grant Hill (8) | The Palace Of Auburn Hills; 20,896 | 8–6 |

March: 11–6 (home: 6–2; road: 5–4)

| Game | Date | Team | Score | High points | High rebounds | High assists | Location Attendance | Record |
|---|---|---|---|---|---|---|---|---|
| 15 | March 2 | @ Chicago | W 108–78 | Grant Hill (17) | Jerome Williams (10) | Grant Hill (11) | United Center; 22,432 | 9–6 |
| 16 | March 4 | @ Cleveland | W 108–78 | Grant Hill (28) | Vaught & Montross (7) | Grant Hill (8) | Gund Arena; 13,248 | 10–6 |
| 17 | March 6 | @ Orlando | L 82–87 | Grant Hill (17) | Don Reid (9) | Grant Hill (5) | Orlando Arena; 17,248 | 10–7 |
| 18 | March 8 | Washington | W 75–71 | Grant Hill (19) | Bison Dele (9) | Grant Hill (8) | The Palace Of Auburn Hills; 15,022 | 11–7 |
| 19 | March 10 | @ Washington | L 87–97 | Grant Hill (16) | Jerome Williams (11) | Lindsey Hunter (7) | MCI Center; 16,316 | 11–8 |
| 20 | March 12 | Boston | W 93–83 | Grant Hill (33) | Loy Vaught (10) | Grant Hill (8) | The Palace Of Auburn Hills; 19,644 | 12–8 |
| 21 | March 14 | Atlanta | L 72–85 | Grant Hill (27) | Grant Hill (11) | Grant Hill (7) | The Palace Of Auburn Hills; 14,834 | 12–9 |
| 22 | March 16 | @ Cleveland | L 82–86 | Grant Hill (23) | Grant Hill (12) | Joe Dumars (6) | Gund Arena; 12,928 | 12–10 |
| 23 | March 17 | Toronto | L 101–103 | Bison Dele (23) | Grant Hill (9) | Joe Dumars (7) | The Palace Of Auburn Hills; 14,981 | 12–11 |
| 24 | March 19 | Dallas | W 94–87 | Jerry Stackhouse (15) | Bison Dele (9) | Grant Hill (9) | The Palace Of Auburn Hills; 18,152 | 13–11 |
| 25 | March 21 | Utah | W 104–101 (OT) | Jerry Stackhouse (32) | Grant Hill (13) | Grant Hill (11) | The Palace Of Auburn Hills; 19,098 | 14–11 |
| 26 | March 22 | @ Milwaukee | L 86–115 | Christian Laettner (17) | Christian Laettner (9) | Laettner & Hill (3) | Bradley Center; 13,187 | 14–12 |
| 27 | March 24 | @ New Jersey | W 84–71 | Bison Dele (18) | Grant Hill (9) | Grant Hill (8) | Continental Airlines Arena; 16,896 | 15–12 |
| 28 | March 26 | Milwaukee | W 90–85 | Jerry Stackhouse (34) | Hill & Williams (9) | Lindsey Hunter (9) | The Palace Of Auburn Hills; 18,873 | 16–12 |
| 29 | March 28 | Seattle | W 104–87 | Lindsey Hunter (20) | Bison Dele (8) | Grant Hill (7) | The Palace Of Auburn Hills; 16,626 | 17–12 |
| 30 | March 30 | @ Atlanta | W 93–77 | Grant Hill (28) | Bison Dele (10) | Grant Hill (8) | Georgia Dome; 14,764 | 18–12 |
| 31 | March 31 | @ Boston | W 87–72 | Lindsey Hunter (17) | Grant Hill (11) | Lindsey Hunter (6) | FleetCenter; 16,915 | 19–12 |

April: 8–8 (home: 4–4; road: 4–4)

| Game | Date | Team | Score | High points | High rebounds | High assists | Location Attendance | Record |
|---|---|---|---|---|---|---|---|---|
| 32 | April 1 | Chicago | W 107–75 | Hill & Dumars (18) | Don Reid (6) | Grant Hill (11) | The Palace Of Auburn Hills; 17,583 | 20–12 |
| 33 | April 3 | Orlando | L 77–92 | Bison Dele (20) | Jud Buechler (9) | Bison Dele (5) | The Palace Of Auburn Hills; 22,076 | 20–13 |
| 34 | April 5 | Indiana | L 86–88 | Bison Dele (19) | Jerome Williams (11) | Joe Dumars (9) | The Palace Of Auburn Hills; 19,642 | 20–14 |
| 35 | April 7 | Atlanta | W 89–82 | Grant Hill (30) | Lindsey Hunter (8) | Grant Hill (9) | The Palace Of Auburn Hills; 16,568 | 21–14 |
| 36 | April 9 | @ Indiana | W 102–101 | Grant Hill (30) | Loy Vaught (7) | Grant Hill (8) | Market Square Arena; 16,720 | 22–14 |
| 37 | April 11 | @ Minnesota | L 79–88 | Grant Hill (27) | Grant Hill (8) | Lindsey Hunter (5) | Target Center; 19,006 | 22–15 |
| 38 | April 12 | Charlotte | L 86–92 | Don Reid (25) | Reid & Vaught (9) | Grant Hill (9) | The Palace Of Auburn Hills; 14,355 | 22–16 |
| 39 | April 14 | @ Charlotte | L 79–83 | Lindsey Hunter (20) | Eric Montross (11) | Charles O'Bannon (5) | Charlotte Coliseum; 18,229 | 22–17 |
| 40 | April 16 | New York | W 80–71 | Lindsey Hunter (23) | Grant Hill (8) | Grant Hill (7) | The Palace Of Auburn Hills; 22,076 | 23–17 |
| 41 | April 18 | @ Orlando | L 81–88 | Lindsey Hunter (25) | Jerome Williams (8) | Hill & Hunter (6) | Orlando Arena; 17,248 | 23–18 |
| 42 | April 21 | @ Charlotte | L 85–88 | Grant Hill (28) | Hill & Williams (9) | Grant Hill (6) | Charlotte Coliseum; 19,385 | 23–19 |
| 43 | April 22 | Philadelphia | L 96–104 | Joe Dumars (19) | Jerome Williams (13) | Joe Dumars (9) | The Palace Of Auburn Hills; 18,652 | 23–20 |
| 44 | April 25 | @ Toronto | W 91–83 | Jerry Stackhouse (24) | Jerome Williams (12) | 3 players tied (4) | Air Canada Centre; 19,800 | 24–20 |
| 45 | April 27 | @ Boston | W 92–85 | Grant Hill (32) | Jerome Williams (14) | Lindsey Hunter (4) | FleetCenter; 16,408 | 25–20 |
| 46 | April 28 | New Jersey | W 101–93 | Grant Hill (25) | Jerome Williams (15) | Grant Hill (6) | The Palace Of Auburn Hills; 17,795 | 26–20 |
| 47 | April 30 | @ Milwaukee | W 81–76 | Joe Dumars (20) | Hill & Dele (8) | Grant Hill (6) | Bradley Center; 18,717 | 27–20 |

May: 2–1 (home: 1–0; road: 1–1)

| Game | Date | Team | Score | High points | High rebounds | High assists | Location Attendance | Record |
|---|---|---|---|---|---|---|---|---|
| 48 | May 2 | Philadelphia | W 100–96 | Grant Hill (35) | Grant Hill (14) | Grant Hill (7) | The Palace Of Auburn Hills; 22,076 | 28–20 |
| 49 | May 3 | @ Chicago | W 115–71 | Grant Hill (22) | Lindsey Hunter (9) | Lindsey Hunter (11) | United Center; 22,306 | 29–20 |
| 50 | May 5 | @ Philadelphia | L 100–105 (OT) | Grant Hill (27) | Jerome Williams (11) | Lindsey Hunter (9) | First Union Center; 20,192 | 29–21 |

1998–99 schedule

== Playoffs ==
1999 playoff game log
First Round: 2–3 (home: 2–0; road: 0–3)

| Game | Date | Team | Score | High points | High rebounds | High assists | Location Attendance | Series |
|---|---|---|---|---|---|---|---|---|
| 1 | May 8 | @ Atlanta | L 70–90 | Grant Hill (26) | Bison Dele (9) | Grant Hill (8) | Georgia Dome; 20,884 | 0–1 |
| 2 | May 10 | @ Atlanta | L 69–89 | Grant Hill (15) | Grant Hill (10) | Joe Dumars (5) | Georgia Dome; 16,377 | 0–2 |
| 3 | May 12 | Atlanta | W 79–63 | Christian Laettner (15) | Jerome Williams (10) | Grant Hill (5) | The Palace of Auburn Hills; 14,812 | 1–2 |
| 4 | May 14 | Atlanta | W 103–82 | Grant Hill (23) | Jerome Williams (8) | Grant Hill (9) | The Palace of Auburn Hills; 16,216 | 2–2 |
| 5 | May 16 | @ Atlanta | L 75–87 | Grant Hill (21) | Dele, Hill (7) | Grant Hill (11) | Alexander Memorial Coliseum; 8,460 | 2–3 |

1999 schedule

== Player statistics ==
Legend
| GP | Games played | GS | Games started | MPG | Minutes per game |
| FG% | Field-goal percentage | 3P% | 3-point field-goal percentage | FT% | Free-throw percentage |
| RPG | Rebounds per game | APG | Assists per game | SPG | Steals per game |
| BPG | Blocks per game | PPG | Points per game |

=== Regular season ===
| Player | GP | GS | MPG | FG% | 3P% | FT% | RPG | APG | SPG | BPG | PPG |
|---|---|---|---|---|---|---|---|---|---|---|---|
| Grant Hill | 50 | 50 | 37.0 | .479 | .000 | .752 | 7.1 | 6.0 | 1.6 | 0.5 | 21.1 |
| Jerry Stackhouse | 42 | 9 | 28.3 | .371 | .278 | .850 | 2.5 | 2.8 | 0.8 | 0.5 | 14.5 |
| Lindsey Hunter | 49 | 49 | 35.8 | .435 | .386 | .753 | 3.4 | 3.9 | 1.8 | 0.2 | 11.9 |
| Joe Dumars | 38 | 38 | 29.4 | .411 | .403 | .836 | 1.8 | 3.5 | 0.6 | 0.1 | 11.3 |
| Bison Dele | 49 | 48 | 24.0 | .501 | .000 | .686 | 5.6 | 1.4 | 0.8 | 0.8 | 10.5 |
| Christian Laettner | 16 | 0 | 21.1 | .358 | .333 | .772 | 3.4 | 1.5 | 0.9 | 0.8 | 7.6 |
| Jerome Williams | 50 | 10 | 23.1 | .500 | | .673 | 7.0 | 0.5 | 1.3 | 0.1 | 7.1 |
| Jud Buechler | 50 | 0 | 21.1 | .417 | .412 | .722 | 2.7 | 1.1 | 0.7 | 0.3 | 5.5 |
| Don Reid | 47 | 30 | 19.9 | .557 | | .608 | 3.6 | 0.7 | 0.6 | 0.9 | 5.1 |
| Korleone Young | 3 | 0 | 5.0 | .500 | .250 | 1.000 | 1.3 | 0.3 | 0.0 | 0.0 | 4.3 |
| Loy Vaught | 37 | 10 | 13.0 | .381 | .000 | .643 | 3.9 | 0.3 | 0.4 | 0.2 | 3.4 |
| Charles O'Bannon | 18 | 1 | 9.2 | .429 | .000 | 1.000 | 1.9 | 0.7 | 0.1 | 0.2 | 3.1 |
| Khalid Reeves | 11 | 0 | 10.2 | .381 | .333 | .571 | 0.6 | 1.0 | 0.4 | 0.0 | 2.3 |
| Eric Montross | 46 | 2 | 12.5 | .525 | .000 | .344 | 3.0 | 0.3 | 0.3 | 0.6 | 2.1 |
| Mikki Moore | 2 | 0 | 3.0 | 1.000 | | 1.000 | 0.5 | 0.0 | 0.0 | 0.0 | 2.0 |
| Mark Macon | 7 | 3 | 9.9 | .200 | .333 | | 0.7 | 0.6 | 0.7 | 0.1 | 1.3 |
| Corey Beck | 8 | 0 | 3.8 | .500 | | 1.000 | 0.6 | 0.0 | 0.3 | 0.0 | 1.3 |
| Steve Henson | 4 | 0 | 6.3 | .500 | | 1.000 | 0.0 | 0.8 | 0.3 | 0.0 | 1.0 |

=== Playoffs ===
| Player | GP | GS | MPG | FG% | 3P% | FT% | RPG | APG | SPG | BPG | PPG |
|---|---|---|---|---|---|---|---|---|---|---|---|
| Grant Hill | 5 | 5 | 35.2 | .457 | .000 | .813 | 7.2 | 7.4 | 2.0 | 0.4 | 19.4 |
| Bison Dele | 5 | 5 | 24.4 | .600 | | .556 | 6.4 | 0.2 | 0.6 | 0.4 | 10.6 |
| Joe Dumars | 5 | 5 | 30.6 | .487 | .526 | 1.000 | 1.4 | 2.6 | 0.4 | 0.0 | 10.2 |
| Christian Laettner | 5 | 0 | 24.6 | .426 | | .786 | 2.8 | 2.2 | 0.8 | 0.2 | 10.2 |
| Jerry Stackhouse | 5 | 0 | 24.8 | .391 | .250 | .857 | 1.6 | 1.2 | 0.4 | 0.2 | 10.0 |
| Lindsey Hunter | 5 | 5 | 36.0 | .264 | .273 | 1.000 | 3.0 | 2.4 | 1.4 | 0.0 | 7.2 |
| Jerome Williams | 5 | 5 | 24.6 | .444 | | .778 | 6.4 | 0.8 | 0.8 | 0.0 | 6.2 |
| Loy Vaught | 2 | 0 | 7.5 | .500 | | | 0.5 | 0.0 | 0.5 | 0.0 | 2.0 |
| Jud Buechler | 5 | 0 | 16.8 | .200 | .250 | | 2.6 | 0.6 | 0.6 | 0.2 | 1.6 |
| Eric Montross | 5 | 0 | 14.0 | .500 | | .500 | 2.6 | 0.0 | 0.0 | 0.4 | 1.4 |
| Don Reid | 4 | 0 | 5.3 | .667 | | | 1.0 | 0.3 | 0.0 | 0.0 | 1.0 |
| Charles O'Bannon | 4 | 0 | 2.3 | .667 | | | 0.3 | 0.3 | 0.0 | 0.0 | 1.0 |

Player statistics citation:

== Awards and records ==
- Grant Hill, All-NBA Second Team

== See also ==
- 1998-99 NBA season
