= 1998–99 Charlotte Hornets season =

NBA professional basketball team season

- Head coach: Dave Cowens (resigned); Paul Silas
- General manager: Bob Bass
- Owner: George Shinn
- Arena: Charlotte Coliseum

Results
- Record: 26–24 (.520)
- Place: Division: 5th (Central); Conference: 9th (Eastern)
- Playoff finish: Did not qualify
- Stats at Basketball Reference

Local media
- Television: WAXN-TV; Fox Sports South
- Radio: WBT

The 1998–99 Charlotte Hornets season was the eleventh season for the Charlotte Hornets in the National Basketball Association. This was the Hornets first full season without Muggsy Bogues and Dell Curry on the roster as they were part of the inaugural season. Due to a lockout, the regular season began on February 5, 1999, and was cut from 82 games to 50.

== Season summary ==
=== Off-season ===
During the off-season, the Hornets signed free agents Derrick Coleman, three-point specialist Chuck Person, Eldridge Recasner and Chucky Brown. However, before the regular season began, the team dealt with injuries as Anthony Mason was lost for the entire season due to a biceps injury suffered in practice, and All-Star forward Glen Rice was out due to an elbow injury.

=== Regular season ===
With the addition of Coleman, Brown and Person, and without Rice and Mason, the Hornets struggled losing eight of their first nine games of the regular season, which included a six-game losing streak in February. Head coach Dave Cowens resigned after a 4–11 start to the season, and was replaced with assistant coach Paul Silas. At mid-season, the team traded Rice, J.R. Reid, and B. J. Armstrong to the Los Angeles Lakers in exchange for All-Star guard Eddie Jones, and Elden Campbell; Armstrong was released by the Lakers, and later signed with the Orlando Magic. Under Silas, the Hornets improved posting a 22–13 record for the remainder of the season, which included a nine-game winning streak in April, as the team finished in fifth place in the Central Division with a 26–24 record. However, despite finishing with a record above .500 in winning percentage, the Hornets failed to qualify for the NBA playoffs, as they finished just one game behind the 8th–seeded New York Knicks.

Jones averaged 17.0 points, 4.2 assists and 3.0 steals per game in 30 games after the trade, and was named to the NBA All-Defensive Second Team, while Campbell averaged 15.3 points, 9.4 rebounds and 1.8 blocks per game in 32 games. In addition, Bobby Phills provided the team with 14.3 points, 3.5 assists and 1.4 steals per game, and also led them with 68 three-point field goals, while David Wesley contributed 14.1 points, 6.4 assists and 2.0 steals per game, Coleman averaged 13.1 points and 8.9 rebounds per game, and Brown provided with 8.5 points and 3.6 rebounds per game. Meanwhile, undrafted rookie center Brad Miller averaged 6.3 points and 3.1 rebounds per game, Person contributed 6.1 points per game, and Recasner provided with 5.0 points and 2.1 assists per game.

Jones also finished tied in seventh place in Defensive Player of the Year voting, while Silas finished tied in sixth place in Coach of the Year voting. The Hornets finished sixth in the NBA in home-game attendance, with an attendance of 480,807 at the Charlotte Coliseum during the regular season.

=== Aftermath ===
Following the season, Person signed as a free agent with the Seattle SuperSonics, and Brown signed with the San Antonio Spurs.

== Offseason ==
=== NBA draft ===
Round	Pick	Player	Position	Nationality	College
1	21	Ricky Davis	SF/SG	United States	Iowa
2	50	Andrew Betts	C	United States	California State-Long Beach

== Roster ==
1998–99 Charlotte Hornets roster
Players

Pos.	No.	Player	Height	Weight	DOB	From
G	15	Corey Beck	6 ft 2 in (1.88 m)	175 lb (79 kg)	1971–05–27	Arkansas
F	52	Chucky Brown	6 ft 7 in (2.01 m)	214 lb (97 kg)	1968–02–29	NC State
C	41	Elden Campbell	6 ft 11 in (2.11 m)	215 lb (98 kg)	1968–07–23	Clemson
F/C	44	Derrick Coleman	6 ft 10 in (2.08 m)	230 lb (104 kg)	1967–06–21	Syracuse
G/F	21	Ricky Davis	6 ft 6 in (1.98 m)	195 lb (88 kg)	1979–09–23	Iowa
F	6	Eddie Jones	6 ft 6 in (1.98 m)	190 lb (86 kg)	1971–10–20	Temple
F	14	Anthony Mason (injured) (IN)	6 ft 7 in (2.01 m)	250 lb (113 kg)	1966–12–14	Tennessee State
C	40	Brad Miller	6 ft 11 in (2.11 m)	244 lb (111 kg)	1976–04–12	Purdue
F	45	Chuck Person	6 ft 8 in (2.03 m)	220 lb (100 kg)	1964–06–27	Auburn
G	13	Bobby Phills	6 ft 5 in (1.96 m)	210 lb (95 kg)	1969–12–20	Southern
G	3	Eldridge Recasner	6 ft 3 in (1.91 m)	190 lb (86 kg)	1967–12–14	Washington
C	33	Charles Shackleford	6 ft 10 in (2.08 m)	225 lb (102 kg)	1966–04–22	NC State
G	4	David Wesley	6 ft 0 in (1.83 m)	190 lb (86 kg)	1970–11–14	Baylor

Coaches
Head coach
- Paul Silas
Assistant(s)
- Mark Osowski
- Lee Rose

Legend
- (DP) Unsigned draft pick
- (FA) Free agent
- (S) Suspended
- (IN) Inactive
- Injured

Roster
Updated: April 6, 1999

=== Roster Notes ===
- Power forward Anthony Mason was on the injured reserve list due to a ruptured biceps injury, and missed the entire regular season.

== Regular season ==
=== Season standings ===
Central Division	W	L	PCT	GB	Home	Road	Div	GP
y-Indiana Pacers	33	17	.660	–	18‍–‍7	15‍–‍10	15–7	50
x-Atlanta Hawks	31	19	.620	2.0	16‍–‍9	15‍–‍10	15–8	50
x-Detroit Pistons	29	21	.580	4.0	17‍–‍8	12‍–‍13	13–8	50
x-Milwaukee Bucks	28	22	.560	5.0	17‍–‍8	11‍–‍14	13–11	50
Charlotte Hornets	26	24	.520	7.0	16‍–‍9	10‍–‍15	12–10	50
Toronto Raptors	23	27	.460	10.0	14‍–‍11	9‍–‍16	9–14	50
Cleveland Cavaliers	22	28	.440	11.0	15‍–‍10	7‍–‍18	9–13	50
Chicago Bulls	13	37	.260	20.0	8‍–‍17	5‍–‍20	4–19	50

Eastern Conference
#	Team	W	L	PCT	GB	GP
1	c-Miami Heat *	33	17	.660	–	50
2	y-Indiana Pacers *	33	17	.660	–	50
3	x-Orlando Magic	33	17	.660	–	50
4	x-Atlanta Hawks	31	19	.620	2.0	50
5	x-Detroit Pistons	29	21	.580	4.0	50
6	x-Philadelphia 76ers	28	22	.560	5.0	50
7	x-Milwaukee Bucks	28	22	.560	5.0	50
8	x-New York Knicks	27	23	.540	6.0	50
9	Charlotte Hornets	26	24	.520	7.0	50
10	Toronto Raptors	23	27	.460	10.0	50
11	Cleveland Cavaliers	22	28	.440	11.0	50
12	Boston Celtics	19	31	.380	14.0	50
13	Washington Wizards	18	32	.360	15.0	50
14	New Jersey Nets	16	34	.320	17.0	50
15	Chicago Bulls	13	37	.260	20.0	50

== Player statistics ==
=== Ragular season ===
Player	POS	GP	GS	MP	REB	AST	STL	BLK	PTS	MPG	RPG	APG	SPG	BPG	PPG
David Wesley	PG	50	50	1,848	161	322	100	10	706	37.0	3.2	6.4	2.0	.2	14.1
Chuck Person	SF	50	21	990	132	60	20	8	303	19.8	2.6	1.2	.4	.2	6.1
Chucky Brown	PF	48	21	1,192	174	57	16	19	407	24.8	3.6	1.2	.3	.4	8.5
Ricky Davis	SG	46	1	557	84	58	30	7	209	12.1	1.8	1.3	.7	.2	4.5
Eldridge Recasner	PG	44	2	708	77	91	17	1	222	16.1	1.8	2.1	.4	.0	5.0
Bobby Phills	SG	43	43	1,574	174	149	60	25	613	36.6	4.0	3.5	1.4	.6	14.3
Brad Miller	C	38	0	469	117	22	9	18	238	12.3	3.1	.6	.2	.5	6.3
Derrick Coleman	PF	37	29	1,178	328	78	24	42	486	31.8	8.9	2.1	.6	1.1	13.1
Elden Campbell^{†}	C	32	32	1,134	301	61	38	57	490	35.4	9.4	1.9	1.2	1.8	15.3
Charles Shackleford	C	32	4	367	129	13	5	13	107	11.5	4.0	.4	.2	.4	3.3
Eddie Jones^{†}	SF	30	30	1,157	118	125	90	34	509	38.6	3.9	4.2	3.0	1.1	17.0
J. R. Reid^{†}	PF	16	16	556	113	25	22	10	243	34.8	7.1	1.6	1.4	.6	15.2
Corey Beck^{†}	PG	16	0	150	23	20	7	2	35	9.4	1.4	1.3	.4	.1	2.2
B. J. Armstrong^{†}	PG	10	1	178	16	27	3	0	57	17.8	1.6	2.7	.3	.0	5.7
Travis Williams	SF	8	0	62	19	2	2	1	15	7.8	2.4	.3	.3	.1	1.9
Willie Burton	SF	3	0	18	6	0	0	0	4	6.0	2.0	.0	.0	.0	1.3
Joe Wolf	PF	3	0	12	1	0	0	0	0	4.0	.3	.0	.0	.0	.0

- ^{†} Denotes player spent time with another team in the season. Stats reflect time with the Hornets only.

== Awards and records ==
- Eddie Jones, NBA All-Defensive Second Team

== Transactions ==
- January 21, 1999

Signed Brad Miller as a free agent.

Signed Eldridge Recasner as a free agent.

Signed Charles Shackleford as a free agent.

Signed Chucky Brown as a free agent.

Signed Derrick Coleman as a free agent.

- January 26, 1999

Signed Chuck Person as a free agent.

- February 3, 1999

Signed Joe Wolf as a free agent.

- February 28, 1999

Signed Willie Burton as a free agent.

- March 8, 1999

Waived Willie Burton.

- March 10, 1999

Waived Joe Wolf.

Traded B. J. Armstrong, J. R. Reid and Glen Rice to the Los Angeles Lakers for Elden Campbell and Eddie Jones.

- March 16, 1999

Waived Travis Williams.

- March 17, 1999

Signed Corey Beck to the first of two 10-day contracts.

- April 6, 1999

Signed Corey Beck to a contract for the rest of the season.

Player Transactions Citation:
