= 1998–99 Atlanta Hawks season =

NBA professional basketball team season

- Head coach: Lenny Wilkens
- Arena: Georgia Dome; Alexander Memorial Coliseum

Results
- Record: 31–19 (.620)
- Place: Division: 2nd (Central); Conference: 4th (Eastern)
- Playoff finish: East Conference Semi-finals (lost to Knicks 0–4)
- Stats at Basketball Reference

Local media
- Television: WATL; Fox Sports South (Bob Rathbun, Mike Glenn)
- Radio: WCNN

The 1998–99 Atlanta Hawks season was the 50th season for the Atlanta Hawks in the National Basketball Association, and their 31st season in Atlanta, Georgia. Due to a lockout, the regular season began on February 5, 1999, and was cut from 82 games to 50.

== Season summary ==
=== Off-season ===
For the second consecutive season, the Hawks continued to split their home games between the Georgia Dome, and the Alexander Memorial Coliseum. During the off-season, the team signed free agents LaPhonso Ellis, second-year guard Anthony Johnson and re-signed former Hawks forward Grant Long; Ellis would reunite with his former teammate of the Denver Nuggets, 3-time Defensive Player of the Year Dikembe Mutombo.

=== Regular season ===
With the addition of Ellis and Long, the Hawks got off to a 6–3 start to the regular season, but then lost six of their next nine games, falling to .500 in winning percentage with a 9–9 start to the season. Ellis suffered a hernia injury after 20 games, and was out for the remainder of the season; he was replaced with second-year forward Chris Crawford as the team's starting small forward. However, after holding a 22–17 record as of April 13, 1999, the team posted a seven-game winning streak during that month, and won nine of their final eleven games of the season. The Hawks finished in second place in the Central Division with a 31–19 record, and earned the fourth seed in the Eastern Conference; the team qualified for the NBA playoffs for the seventh consecutive year.

Steve Smith led the Hawks in scoring with 18.7 points per game, while Mookie Blaylock averaged 13.3 points, 5.8 assists and 2.1 steals per game, and led the team with 77 three-point field goals, but only shot .379 in field-goal percentage, and Alan Henderson provided the team with 12.5 points and 6.6 rebounds per game. In addition, Mutombo provided with 10.8 points, 12.2 rebounds and 2.9 blocks per game, while Ellis contributed 10.2 points and 5.5 rebounds. Off the bench, Long played a sixth man role, averaging 9.8 points and 5.9 rebounds per game, while Corbin contributed 7.5 points per game, Crawford, the team's starting small forward, averaged 6.9 points per game, and Johnson provided with 5.0 points and 2.2 assists per game.

Mutombo and Blaylock were both named to the NBA All-Defensive Second Team, while Mutombo also finished in second place in Defensive Player of the Year voting, behind his former Georgetown University teammate, Alonzo Mourning of the Miami Heat; Smith finished tied in 16th place in Most Valuable Player voting, and head coach Lenny Wilkens finished tied in eighth place in Coach of the Year voting. The Hawks finished 27th in the NBA in home-game attendance, with an attendance of 331,831 at the Georgia Dome, and the Alexander Memorial Coliseum during the regular season, which was the third-lowest in the league.

=== NBA playoffs ===
In the Eastern Conference First Round of the 1999 NBA playoffs, the Hawks faced off against the 5th–seeded Detroit Pistons, who were led by All-Star forward Grant Hill, sixth man Jerry Stackhouse, and Lindsey Hunter. Despite losing Henderson to an eye injury in Game 1, and losing Crawford to a shoulder injury in Game 2, the Hawks won the first two games over the Pistons at home at the Georgia Dome, and took a 2–0 series lead. However, the team lost the next two games on the road, which included a Game 4 loss to the Pistons at The Palace of Auburn Hills, 103–82. With the series tied at 2–2, the Hawks won Game 5 over the Pistons at home, 87–75 at the Alexander Memorial Coliseum to win in a hard-fought five-game series; Game 5 of the series was played at the Alexander Memorial Coliseum, because the Georgia Dome was booked for a concert.

In the Eastern Conference Semi-finals, the team faced off against the 8th–seeded New York Knicks, a team that featured All-Star center Patrick Ewing, Allan Houston, and sixth man Latrell Sprewell. Despite having home-court advantage in the series, the Hawks lost the first two games to the Knicks at the Georgia Dome, before losing the next two games on the road, including a Game 4 loss to the Knicks at Madison Square Garden, 79–66, thus losing the series in a four-game sweep; the Hawks struggled only shooting .316 in field-goal percentage during the series.

The Knicks would become the first #8 seed to advance to the NBA Finals, but would lose to the San Antonio Spurs in five games in the 1999 NBA Finals. This season would also be the last time that the Hawks appeared in the NBA playoffs until the 2007–08 season, as what would follow was an eight-year playoff drought.

=== Aftermath ===
Following the season, Smith and second-year guard Ed Gray were both traded to the Portland Trail Blazers, while Blaylock was traded to the Golden State Warriors after seven seasons with the Hawks, Long signed as a free agent with the Vancouver Grizzlies, and Tyrone Corbin re-signed with the Sacramento Kings.

== Offseason ==
=== Draft picks ===
Round	Pick	Player	Position	Nationality	College
1	20	Roshown McLeod	SF	United States	Duke
2	49	Cory Carr	SG	United States	Texas Tech

== Roster ==
1998–99 Atlanta Hawks roster
Players

Pos.	No.	Player	Height	Weight	DOB	From
G	10	Mookie Blaylock	6 ft 0 in (1.83 m)	180 lb (82 kg)	1967–03–20	Oklahoma
G/F	33	Tyrone Corbin	6 ft 6 in (1.98 m)	210 lb (95 kg)	1962–12–31	DePaul
F	4	Chris Crawford	6 ft 9 in (2.06 m)	235 lb (107 kg)	1975–05–13	Marquette
F	20	LaPhonso Ellis (injured)	6 ft 8 in (2.03 m)	240 lb (109 kg)	1970–05–05	Notre Dame
G	22	Ed Gray	6 ft 3 in (1.91 m)	210 lb (95 kg)	1975–09–27	California
F	44	Alan Henderson (injured)	6 ft 9 in (2.06 m)	235 lb (107 kg)	1972–12–02	Indiana
G	24	Anthony Johnson	6 ft 3 in (1.91 m)	190 lb (86 kg)	1974–10–02	College of Charleston
F	43	Grant Long	6 ft 8 in (2.03 m)	225 lb (102 kg)	1966–03–12	Eastern Michigan
F	7	Roshown McLeod	6 ft 8 in (2.03 m)	221 lb (100 kg)	1975–11–17	Duke
C	55	Dikembe Mutombo	7 ft 2 in (2.18 m)	260 lb (118 kg)	1966–06–25	Georgetown
G	15	Jeff Sheppard	6 ft 3 in (1.91 m)	190 lb (86 kg)	1974–09–29	Kentucky
G	8	Steve Smith	6 ft 8 in (2.03 m)	200 lb (91 kg)	1969–03–31	Michigan State
C	41	Mark West	6 ft 10 in (2.08 m)	230 lb (104 kg)	1960–11–05	Old Dominion

Coaches
Head coach
- Lenny Wilkens
Assistant(s)
- Stan Albeck
- Phil Hubbard
- Gary Wortman

Legend
- (DP) Unsigned draft pick
- (FA) Free agent
- (S) Suspended
- Injured

Roster

== Regular season ==
=== Season standings ===
Central Division	W	L	PCT	GB	Home	Road	Div	GP
y-Indiana Pacers	33	17	.660	–	18‍–‍7	15‍–‍10	15–7	50
x-Atlanta Hawks	31	19	.620	2.0	16‍–‍9	15‍–‍10	15–8	50
x-Detroit Pistons	29	21	.580	4.0	17‍–‍8	12‍–‍13	13–8	50
x-Milwaukee Bucks	28	22	.560	5.0	17‍–‍8	11‍–‍14	13–11	50
Charlotte Hornets	26	24	.520	7.0	16‍–‍9	10‍–‍15	12–10	50
Toronto Raptors	23	27	.460	10.0	14‍–‍11	9‍–‍16	9–14	50
Cleveland Cavaliers	22	28	.440	11.0	15‍–‍10	7‍–‍18	9–13	50
Chicago Bulls	13	37	.260	20.0	8‍–‍17	5‍–‍20	4–19	50

Eastern Conference
#	Team	W	L	PCT	GB	GP
1	c-Miami Heat *	33	17	.660	–	50
2	y-Indiana Pacers *	33	17	.660	–	50
3	x-Orlando Magic	33	17	.660	–	50
4	x-Atlanta Hawks	31	19	.620	2.0	50
5	x-Detroit Pistons	29	21	.580	4.0	50
6	x-Philadelphia 76ers	28	22	.560	5.0	50
7	x-Milwaukee Bucks	28	22	.560	5.0	50
8	x-New York Knicks	27	23	.540	6.0	50
9	Charlotte Hornets	26	24	.520	7.0	50
10	Toronto Raptors	23	27	.460	10.0	50
11	Cleveland Cavaliers	22	28	.440	11.0	50
12	Boston Celtics	19	31	.380	14.0	50
13	Washington Wizards	18	32	.360	15.0	50
14	New Jersey Nets	16	34	.320	17.0	50
15	Chicago Bulls	13	37	.260	20.0	50

z - clinched division title
y - clinched division title
x - clinched playoff spot

=== Game log ===
1998–99 game log
February

Game	Date	Team	Score	High points	High rebounds	High assists	Location Attendance	Record

March

Game	Date	Team	Score	High points	High rebounds	High assists	Location Attendance	Record

April

Game	Date	Team	Score	High points	High rebounds	High assists	Location Attendance	Record

May

Game	Date	Team	Score	High points	High rebounds	High assists	Location Attendance	Record

1998–99 schedule

== Playoffs ==
1999 playoff game log
First round: 3–2 (home: 3–0; road: 0–2)

Game	Date	Team	Score	High points	High rebounds	High assists	Location Attendance	Series
1	May 8	Detroit	W 90–70	Steve Smith (19)	Dikembe Mutombo (19)	Mookie Blaylock (7)	Georgia Dome; 20,884	1–0
2	May 10	Detroit	W 89–69	Dikembe Mutombo (28)	Dikembe Mutombo (13)	Mookie Blaylock (6)	Georgia Dome; 16,377	2–0
3	May 12	@ Detroit	L 63–79	Tyrone Corbin (16)	Dikembe Mutombo (10)	Mookie Blaylock (5)	The Palace of Auburn Hills; 14,812	2–1
4	May 14	@ Detroit	L 82–103	Steve Smith (21)	Dikembe Mutombo (8)	Corbin, Johnson (4)	The Palace of Auburn Hills; 16,216	2–2
5	May 16	Detroit	W 87–75	Grant Long (26)	Dikembe Mutombo (18)	Blaylock, Smith (6)	Alexander Memorial Coliseum; 8,460	3–2

Conference Semi-finals: 0–4 (home: 0–2; road: 0–2)

Game	Date	Team	Score	High points	High rebounds	High assists	Location Attendance	Series
1	May 18	New York	L 92–100	Chris Crawford (26)	Dikembe Mutombo (13)	Mookie Blaylock (4)	Georgia Dome; 18,513	0–1
2	May 20	New York	L 70–77	Mookie Blaylock (17)	Dikembe Mutombo (17)	Steve Smith (2)	Georgia Dome; 22,558	0–2
3	May 23	@ New York	L 78–90	Long, Smith (17)	Dikembe Mutombo (16)	Mookie Blaylock (3)	Madison Square Garden; 19,763	0–3
4	May 24	@ New York	L 66–79	Steve Smith (14)	Long, Mutombo (11)	three players tied (3)	Madison Square Garden; 19,763	0–4

1999 schedule

== Player statistics ==
Legend
GP	Games played	GS	Games started	MPG	Minutes per game
FG%	Field-goal percentage	3P%	3-point field-goal percentage	FT%	Free-throw percentage
RPG	Rebounds per game	APG	Assists per game	SPG	Steals per game
BPG	Blocks per game	PPG	Points per game

=== Season ===
Player	GP	GS	MPG	FG%	3P%	FT%	RPG	APG	SPG	BPG	PPG
Mookie Blaylock	48	48	36.7	.379	.307	.758	4.7	5.8	2.1	.2	13.3
Tyrone Corbin	47	6	22.7	.391	.319	.650	3.1	0.9	0.7	.1	7.5
Chris Crawford	42	30	18.7	.431	.333	.814	2.1	.6	.2	.3	6.9
LaPhonso Ellis	20	20	27.0	.421	.200	.705	5.5	.9	.4	.4	10.2
Ed Gray	30	3	11.2	.291	.286	.757	.9	.4	.4	.	4.9
Alan Henderson	38	37	30.1	.442	.000	.671	6.6	.7	.9	.5	12.5
Anthony Johnson	49	2	18.1	.404	.263	.695	1.5	2.2	.7	.1	5.0
Grant Long	50	13	27.6	.421	.167	.783	5.9	1.1	1.1	.3	9.8
Roshown McLeod	34	0	10.2	.380	.100	.822	1.5	.4	.1	.	4.8
Dikembe Mutombo	50	50	36.6	.512	.	.684	12.2	1.1	.3	2.9	10.8
Jeff Sheppard	18	5	10.3	.385	.286	.615	1.2	.9	.2	.	2.2
Steve Smith	36	36	36.5	.402	.338	.849	4.2	3.3	1.0	.3	18.7
Mark West	49	0	10.2	.373	.	.356	2.6	.3	.1	.4	1.2
Shammond Williams	2	0	2.0	.000	.	.750	.	.5	.	.	1.5

=== Playoffs ===
Player	GP	GS	MPG	FG%	3P%	FT%	RPG	APG	SPG	BPG	PPG
Mookie Blaylock	9	9	39.8	.326	.353	.467	4.0	4.0	2.0	0.2	12.6
Tyrone Corbin	9	4	29.8	.417	.261	.750	3.7	1.8	0.7	0.0	7.7
Chris Crawford	6	5	20.8	.333	.286	.885	3.2	0.8	0.2	0.2	9.8
Ed Gray	8	0	8.9	.366	.364	.909	1.1	0.5	0.8	0.1	5.5
Alan Henderson	1	0	4.0				0.0	0.0	0.0	0.0	0.0
Anthony Johnson	9	0	12.3	.276	.500	.700	1.0	1.1	0.1	0.1	2.7
Grant Long	9	9	39.8	.409	.250	.727	8.2	0.9	2.0	0.4	11.7
Roshown McLeod	6	0	8.2	.524		1.000	0.5	0.2	0.2	0.2	4.3
Dikembe Mutombo	9	9	42.2	.563		.702	13.9	1.2	0.6	2.6	12.6
Jeff Sheppard	4	0	3.0	.000			0.5	0.5	0.3	0.0	0.0
Steve Smith	9	9	39.6	.353	.273	.907	3.4	3.3	1.6	0.2	17.3
Mark West	9	0	7.6	.300		.500	1.0	0.2	0.2	0.1	0.9

Player statistics citation:

== Awards and records ==
- Mookie Blaylock, NBA All-Defensive Second Team
- Dikembe Mutombo, NBA All-Defensive Second Team

== Transactions ==
=== Trades ===
June 24, 1998

- Traded Cory Carr, a 1999 second round draft pick and a 2000 second round draft pick to the Chicago Bulls for Shammond Williams.

January 22, 1999

- Traded Christian Laettner to the Detroit Pistons for Scot Pollard and a 1999 first round draft pick.

=== Free agents ===
January 21, 1999

- Signed Jeff Sheppard as a free agent.
- Signed Anthony Johnson as a free agent.
- Signed Mark West as a free agent.

January 30, 1999

- Signed LaPhonso Ellis as a free agent.

February 1, 1999

- Signed Grant Long as a free agent.

February 16, 1999

- Waived Jeff Sheppard.

February 19, 1999

- Waived Scot Pollard.
- Waived Shammond Williams.

February 22, 1999

- Signed Jeff Sheppard as a free agent.

March 4, 1999

- Waived Jeff Sheppard.

March 19, 1999

- Signed Jeff Sheppard to the first of two 10-day contracts.

April 8, 1999

- Signed Jeff Sheppard to a contract for the rest of the season.

Player transactions citation:

== See also ==
- 1998-99 NBA season
