= Vitaly Potapenko =

Ukrainian basketball player

Vitalii Potapenko
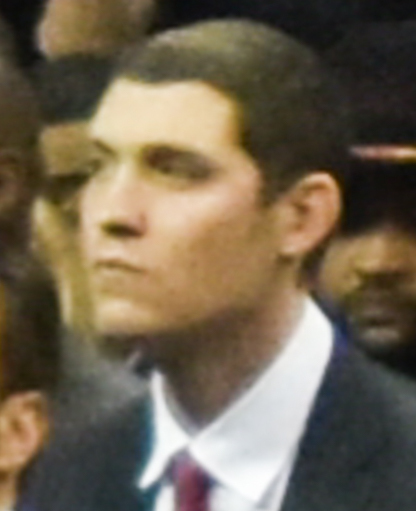
- Potapenko in 2016

Detroit Pistons
- Title: Assistant coach
- League: NBA

Personal information
- Born: March 21, 1975 (age 51) Kyiv, Ukrainian SSR, Soviet Union
- Listed height: 6 ft 10 in (2.08 m)
- Listed weight: 280 lb (127 kg)

Career information
- College: Wright State (1994–1996)
- NBA draft: 1996: 1st round, 12th overall pick
- Drafted by: Cleveland Cavaliers
- Playing career: 1992–2008
- Position: Center
- Number: 52, 9, 20
- Coaching career: 2009–present

Career history

Playing
- 1992–1994: Budivelnyk
- 1996–1999: Cleveland Cavaliers
- 1999–2002: Boston Celtics
- 2002–2006: Seattle SuperSonics
- 2006–2007: Sacramento Kings
- 2007–2008: Estudiantes

Coaching
- 2009–2010: Fort Wayne Mad Ants (assistant)
- 2010–2011: Indiana Pacers (assistant)
- 2011–2012: Dakota Wizards (assistant)
- 2012–2013: Santa Cruz Warriors (assistant)
- 2013–2017: Cleveland Cavaliers (assistant)
- 2018–2024: Memphis Grizzlies (assistant)
- 2024–present: Detroit Pistons (assistant)

Career highlights
- As player: 2× Ukrainian champion (1993, 1994); 2× First-team All-MCC (1995, 1996); As assistant coach: NBA champion (2016)

Career NBA statistics
- Points: 3,995 (6.5 ppg)
- Rebounds: 2,725 (4.5 rpg)
- Assists: 418 (0.7 apg)
- Stats at NBA.com
- Stats at Basketball Reference

Vitalii Mykolayovych Potapenko (/poʊˈtɑːpɛŋkoʊ/ poh-TAH-peng-koh, Ukrainian: Віталій Миколайович Потапенко; born March 21, 1975) is a Ukrainian professional basketball coach and former player who is an assistant coach for the Detroit Pistons of the National Basketball Association (NBA). He played college basketball for the Wright State Raiders and was selected 12th overall by the Cleveland Cavaliers in the 1996 NBA draft, also the last pick before Kobe Bryant. Nicknamed "the Ukraine Train", he played for the Cleveland Cavaliers, the Boston Celtics, the Seattle SuperSonics, and the Sacramento Kings of the NBA, as well as MMT Estudiantes in the Spanish ACB.

Since retiring as a player, Potapenko has been serving as an assistant coach for several teams, among them the Fort Wayne Mad Ants, the Indiana Pacers, the Dakota Wizards, and the Santa Cruz Warriors and later as an assistant director of player development for the Cleveland Cavaliers, helping them win their first ever NBA championship.

== NBA career statistics ==
Legend
GP	Games played	GS	Games started	MPG	Minutes per game
FG%	Field goal percentage	3P%	3-point field goal percentage	FT%	Free throw percentage
RPG	Rebounds per game	APG	Assists per game	SPG	Steals per game
BPG	Blocks per game	PPG	Points per game	**Bold**	Career high

=== Regular season ===
Year	Team	GP	GS	MPG	FG%	3P%	FT%	RPG	APG	SPG	BPG	PPG
1996–97	Cleveland	80	3	15.5	.440	**.500**	.736	2.7	.5	.3	.4	5.8
1997–98	Cleveland	80	0	17.7	.480	.000	.708	3.9	.7	.3	.4	7.1
1998–99	Cleveland	17	12	27.5	.437	.000	.673	5.5	.9	.6	**.9**	8.4
1998–99	Boston	33	32	**28.1**	.521	–	.547	**7.2**	**1.8**	**.7**	.6	**10.8**
1999–00	Boston	79	**72**	22.7	.499	.000	.681	6.3	1.0	.5	.4	9.2
2000–01	Boston	**82**	7	23.2	.476	–	.728	6.0	.8	.6	.3	7.5
2001–02	Boston	79	9	17.0	.455	–	.742	4.4	.4	.5	.2	4.6
2002–03	Seattle	26	2	15.4	.441	–	.759	3.4	.2	.3	.3	4.6
2003–04	Seattle	65	39	21.8	.489	–	.641	4.4	.8	.3	.4	7.1
2004–05	Seattle	33	1	10.2	.517	–	**.871**	2.4	.3	.2	.1	3.5
2005–06	Seattle	24	12	13.4	.500	–	.588	2.6	.3	.1	.1	3.1
2005–06	Sacramento	9	0	3.5	**.714**	–	–	.2	.2	.0	.0	1.1
2006–07	Sacramento	3	0	4.3	.000	–	–	.7	.0	.0	.0	.0
Career		610	189	19.0	.479	.167	.694	4.5	.7	.4	.3	6.5

=== Playoffs ===
Year	Team	GP	GS	MPG	FG%	3P%	FT%	RPG	APG	SPG	BPG	PPG
1998	Cleveland	4	0	**17.5**	.400	–	.500	**2.8**	**.8**	**.5**	.0	**4.3**
2005	Seattle	**5**	0	7.4	**.500**	–	–	1.4	.0	.0	.0	2.0
2006	Sacramento	4	0	2.4	**.500**	–	–	.3	.0	.3	.0	1.0
Career		13	0	9.0	.448	–	.500	1.5	.2	.2	.0	2.4

== See also ==
- List of foreign NBA coaches
