= 1998–99 Cleveland Cavaliers season =

NBA professional basketball team season

- Head coach: Mike Fratello
- Arena: Gund Arena

Results
- Record: 22–28 (.440)
- Place: Division: 7th (Central); Conference: 11th (Eastern)
- Playoff finish: Did not qualify
- Stats at Basketball Reference

Local media
- Television: Fox Sports Ohio · WUAB
- Radio: WTAM

The 1998–99 Cleveland Cavaliers season was the 29th season for the Cleveland Cavaliers in the National Basketball Association. Due to a lockout, the regular season began on February 5, 1999, and was cut from 82 games to 50.

== Season summary ==
=== Off-season ===
During the off-season, the Cavaliers re-signed free agent Johnny Newman, who previously played for the team during the 1986–87 season.

=== Regular season ===
The Cavaliers lost their first three games of the regular season, but then posted a five-game winning streak afterwards. However, second-year star Zydrunas Ilgauskas suffered a foot injury after only just five games, and was out for the remainder of the season, averaging 15.2 points, 8.8 rebounds and 1.4 blocks per game. At mid-season, the team traded Vitaly Potapenko to the Boston Celtics in exchange for Andrew DeClercq, and signed free agent Corie Blount, who was previously released by the Los Angeles Lakers. With a 21–18 record as of April 16, 1999, the Cavaliers struggled posting a seven-game losing streak afterwards, and lost ten of their final eleven games of the season, finishing in seventh place in the Central Division with a 22–28 record, and missing the NBA playoffs.

Shawn Kemp averaged 20.5 points and 9.2 rebounds per game, while Wesley Person averaged 11.2 points per game and led the Cavaliers with 75 three-point field goals, and second-year guard Derek Anderson provided the team with 10.8 points and 3.8 assists per game off the bench. In addition, second-year guard Brevin Knight contributed 9.6 points, 7.7 assists and 1.8 steals per game, while second-year forward Cedric Henderson provided with 9.1 points per game, and DeClercq averaged 9.0 points and 5.8 rebounds per game in 33 games after the trade. Off the bench, Danny Ferry provided with 7.0 points per game, while Newman contributed 6.1 points per game, and Bob Sura averaged 4.3 points and 3.0 assists per game, but only shot .333 in field-goal percentage.

Kemp finished in eleventh place in Most Valuable Player voting. However, Kemp was a shell of his former self as he reported to practice weighing 315 lbs; according to the Cavaliers' General Manager Wayne Embry, the league listed him at 280 lbs. The Cavaliers finished 25th in the NBA in home-game attendance, with an attendance of 352,992 at the Gund Arena during the regular season, which was the fifth-lowest in the league.

=== Aftermath ===
Following the season, head coach Mike Fratello was fired after six seasons with the Cavaliers, while Anderson and Newman were both traded to the Los Angeles Clippers; Newman would never play for the Clippers as the team traded him back to his former team, the New Jersey Nets, and Blount signed as a free agent with the Phoenix Suns.

== Draft picks ==
Round	Pick	Player	Position	Nationality	School/Club team
2	48	Ryan Stack	Center	United States	South Carolina

- 1st round pick (#19) traded to Milwaukee in Sherman Douglas deal. Used to draft Pat Garrity.

== Roster ==
1998–99 Cleveland Cavaliers roster
Players

Pos.	No.	Player	Height	Weight	DOB	From
G	23	Derek Anderson	6 ft 5 in (1.96 m)	220 lb (100 kg)	1974–07–18	Kentucky
F	44	Corie Blount	6 ft 9 in (2.06 m)	240 lb (109 kg)	1969–01–04	Cincinnati
G	5	Earl Boykins	5 ft 5 in (1.65 m)	133 lb (60 kg)	1976–06–02	Eastern Michigan
G	6	Mitchell Butler	6 ft 5 in (1.96 m)	210 lb (95 kg)	1970–12–15	UCLA
C	55	Andrew DeClercq	6 ft 10 in (2.08 m)	255 lb (116 kg)	1973–02–01	Florida
F/C	35	Danny Ferry	6 ft 10 in (2.08 m)	230 lb (104 kg)	1966–10–17	Duke
F	45	Cedric Henderson	6 ft 7 in (2.01 m)	215 lb (98 kg)	1975–03–11	Memphis
C	11	Zydrunas Ilgauskas	7 ft 3 in (2.21 m)	238 lb (108 kg)	1975–06–05	Lithuania
F/C	4	Shawn Kemp	6 ft 10 in (2.08 m)	230 lb (104 kg)	1969–11–26	Trinity Valley CC
G	12	Brevin Knight	5 ft 10 in (1.78 m)	170 lb (77 kg)	1975–11–08	Stanford
F	20	Johnny Newman	6 ft 7 in (2.01 m)	190 lb (86 kg)	1963–11–28	Richmond
G	1	Wesley Person	6 ft 6 in (1.98 m)	195 lb (88 kg)	1971–03–28	Auburn
F/C	10	Ryan Stack	6 ft 11 in (2.11 m)	215 lb (98 kg)	1975–07–24	South Carolina
G	3	Bob Sura	6 ft 5 in (1.96 m)	200 lb (91 kg)	1973–03–25	Florida State

Coaches
Head coach
- Mike Fratello
Assistant(s)
- Marc Iavaroni
- Sidney Lowe
- Ron Rothstein

Legend
- (DP) Unsigned draft pick
- (FA) Free agent
- (S) Suspended
- Injured

Roster
Updated: April 2, 1999

== Regular season ==
=== Season standings ===
Central Division	W	L	PCT	GB	Home	Road	Div	GP
y-Indiana Pacers	33	17	.660	–	18‍–‍7	15‍–‍10	15–7	50
x-Atlanta Hawks	31	19	.620	2.0	16‍–‍9	15‍–‍10	15–8	50
x-Detroit Pistons	29	21	.580	4.0	17‍–‍8	12‍–‍13	13–8	50
x-Milwaukee Bucks	28	22	.560	5.0	17‍–‍8	11‍–‍14	13–11	50
Charlotte Hornets	26	24	.520	7.0	16‍–‍9	10‍–‍15	12–10	50
Toronto Raptors	23	27	.460	10.0	14‍–‍11	9‍–‍16	9–14	50
Cleveland Cavaliers	22	28	.440	11.0	15‍–‍10	7‍–‍18	9–13	50
Chicago Bulls	13	37	.260	20.0	8‍–‍17	5‍–‍20	4–19	50

Eastern Conference
#	Team	W	L	PCT	GB	GP
1	c-Miami Heat *	33	17	.660	–	50
2	y-Indiana Pacers *	33	17	.660	–	50
3	x-Orlando Magic	33	17	.660	–	50
4	x-Atlanta Hawks	31	19	.620	2.0	50
5	x-Detroit Pistons	29	21	.580	4.0	50
6	x-Philadelphia 76ers	28	22	.560	5.0	50
7	x-Milwaukee Bucks	28	22	.560	5.0	50
8	x-New York Knicks	27	23	.540	6.0	50
9	Charlotte Hornets	26	24	.520	7.0	50
10	Toronto Raptors	23	27	.460	10.0	50
11	Cleveland Cavaliers	22	28	.440	11.0	50
12	Boston Celtics	19	31	.380	14.0	50
13	Washington Wizards	18	32	.360	15.0	50
14	New Jersey Nets	16	34	.320	17.0	50
15	Chicago Bulls	13	37	.260	20.0	50

== Game log ==
1998–99 game log
Total: 22–28 (Home: 15–10; Road: 7–18)
February: 5–6 (home: 4–3; road: 1–3)

Game	Date	Team	Score	High points	High rebounds	High assists	Location Attendance	Record
1	February 5, 1999	@ Atlanta	L 83–100				Georgia Dome; 19,806	0–1
2	February 6, 1999	@ Boston	L 73–77				FleetCenter; 18,173	0–2

March: 9–8 (home: 6–2; road: 3–6)

Game	Date	Team	Score	High points	High rebounds	High assists	Location Attendance	Record
13	March 2, 1999	Boston	W 116–99				Gund Arena; 12,906	6–7
24	March 23, 1999	Boston	W 113–86				Gund Arena; 15,810	13–11

April: 8–11 (home: 5–4; road: 3–7)

Game	Date	Team	Score	High points	High rebounds	High assists	Location Attendance	Record
35	April 10, 1999	Atlanta	W 81–67				Gund Arena; 13,859	18–17
36	April 12, 1999	@ Boston	L 89–103				FleetCenter; 15,622	18–18

May: 0–3 (home: 0–1; road: 0–2)

Game	Date	Team	Score	High points	High rebounds	High assists	Location Attendance	Record
48	May 2, 1999	Atlanta	W 65–76				Gund Arena; 12,690	22–26

1998–99 schedule

== Player stats ==
Legend
GP	Games played	GS	Games started	MPG	Minutes per game
FG%	Field-goal percentage	3P%	3-point field-goal percentage	FT%	Free-throw percentage
RPG	Rebounds per game	APG	Assists per game	SPG	Steals per game
BPG	Blocks per game	PPG	Points per game

=== Regular season ===
Player	GP	GS	MPG	FG%	3P%	FT%	RPG	APG	SPG	BPG	PPG
Shawn Kemp	42	42	35.1	48.2	50.0	78.9	9.2	2.4	1.1	1.1	20.5
Zydrunas Ilgauskas	5	5	34.2	50.9	0.0	60.0	8.8	0.8	0.8	1.4	15.2
Wesley Person	45	42	29.8	45.3	37.5	60.4	3.2	1.8	0.8	0.4	11.2
Derek Anderson	38	13	25.7	39.8	30.4	83.6	2.9	3.8	1.3	0.1	10.8
Brevin Knight	39	38	30.4	42.5	0.0	74.5	3.4	7.7	1.8	0.2	9.6
Cedric Henderson	50	48	30.3	41.7	16.7	81.3	3.9	2.3	1.2	0.5	9.1
Andrew DeClercq	33	31	25.6	50.2	0.0	67.9	5.8	0.6	1.1	0.6	9.0
Vitaly Potapenko	17	12	27.5	43.7	0.0	67.3	5.5	0.9	0.6	0.9	8.4
Danny Ferry	50	10	21.2	47.6	39.2	87.9	2.0	1.1	0.5	0.2	7.0
Johnny Newman	50	2	19.0	42.2	37.7	81.0	1.5	0.8	0.6	0.2	6.1
Mitchell Butler	31	1	13.5	48.2	37.9	71.9	1.4	0.7	0.5	0.1	5.4
Bob Sura	50	6	16.8	33.3	20.0	63.1	2.0	3.0	0.9	0.3	4.3
Corie Blount	20	0	18.4	34.3	0.0	52.4	5.3	0.5	0.9	0.6	3.4
Ryan Stack	18	0	11.1	37.8	0.0	95.0	1.9	0.3	0.1	0.6	2.6
Earl Boykins	17	0	10.0	34.5	15.4	66.7	0.8	1.6	0.3	0.0	2.6
Antonio Lang	10	0	6.5	66.7	0.0	55.6	1.6	0.1	0.2	0.1	1.3
Litterial Green	1	0	2.0	0.0	0.0	0.0	0.0	0.0	0.0	0.0	0.0

Player statistics citation:
