= Doug Overton =

American basketball player and coach

Personal information
- Born: August 3, 1969 (age 57) Philadelphia, Pennsylvania, U.S.
- Listed height: 6 ft 3 in (1.91 m)
- Listed weight: 190 lb (86 kg)

Career information
- High school: Dobbins Technical (Philadelphia, Pennsylvania)
- College: La Salle (1987–1991)
- NBA draft: 1991: 2nd round, 40th overall pick
- Drafted by: Detroit Pistons
- Playing career: 1991–2005
- Position: Point guard
- Number: 14, 11, 9, 20, 24, 2
- Coaching career: 2006–2020

Career history

Playing
- 1991–1992: Rockford Lightning
- 1992: Illawarra Hawks
- 1992–1995: Washington Bullets
- 1995–1996: Denver Nuggets
- 1996–1998: Philadelphia 76ers
- 1999: Orlando Magic
- 1999: New Jersey Nets
- 1999: Philadelphia 76ers
- 1999–2000: Boston Celtics
- 2000–2001: Kansas City Knights
- 2001: Charlotte Hornets
- 2001: New Jersey Nets
- 2001–2002: Kansas City Knights
- 2002: FC Barcelona
- 2003: Sioux Falls Skyforce
- 2003–2004: Los Angeles Clippers
- 2005: Michigan Mayhem

Coaching
- 2006–2008: St. Joseph's (assistant)
- 2008–2013: New Jersey / Brooklyn Nets (assistant)
- 2013–2014: Springfield Armor
- 2016–2020: Lincoln (PA)

Career highlights
- All-NBL First Team (1992); 3× First-team All-MAAC (1989–1991)

Career NBA statistics
- Points: 2,253 (4.5 ppg)
- Rebounds: 654 (1.3 rpg)
- Assists: 1,038 (2.1 apg)
- Stats at NBA.com
- Stats at Basketball Reference

Douglas M. Overton (born August 3, 1969) is an American former professional basketball player and coach. He played eleven seasons in the National Basketball Association (NBA) following a college career with the La Salle Explorers.

== Playing career ==
Prior to his NBA career, Overton spent a season with the Illawarra Hawks of the Australian NBL. He credits his experience playing in Australia as the reason he was able to make the NBA during a podcast with aussiehoopla.com

Overton was selected by the Detroit Pistons in the 2nd round (40th overall) of the 1991 NBA draft. A 6-foot-3-inch (1.91 m) point guard from La Salle University, Overton played in 11 NBA seasons for 8 teams. He played for the Washington Bullets, Denver Nuggets, Philadelphia 76ers, Orlando Magic, New Jersey Nets, Boston Celtics, Charlotte Hornets and Los Angeles Clippers.

In his NBA career, Overton played in 499 games and scored a total of 2,253 points.

== Coaching career ==
In May 2006, Overton was named assistant men's basketball coach at Saint Joseph's University. He became an assistant coach for the NBA's New Jersey Nets (now Brooklyn Nets) in 2008. He was also named Nets Player Development Coach prior to the 2010–11 season. In August 2013, he was named head coach of the D-League's Springfield Armor. Overton later coached Lincoln University men's basketball in Oxford, Pennsylvania.

== Career statistics ==
Legend
GP	Games played	GS	Games started	MPG	Minutes per game
FG%	Field goal percentage	3P%	3-point field goal percentage	FT%	Free throw percentage
RPG	Rebounds per game	APG	Assists per game	SPG	Steals per game
BPG	Blocks per game	PPG	Points per game	**Bold**	Career high
*	Led the league

=== NBA ===
==== Regular season ====
Year	Team	GP	GS	MPG	FG%	3P%	FT%	RPG	APG	SPG	BPG	PPG
1992–93	Washington	45	13	22.0	.471	.231	.728	**2.4**	3.5	**.7**	**.1**	**8.1**
1993–94	Washington	61	1	12.3	.403	.091	.827	1.1	1.5	.3	.0	3.6
1994–95	Washington	**82***	**20**	20.8	.416	.424	.872	1.7	3.0	.6	.0	7.0
1995–96	Denver	55	0	11.0	.376	.308	.727	1.1	1.9	.2	**.1**	3.3
1996–97	Philadelphia	61	4	10.4	.426	.250	.938	1.1	1.7	.4	.0	3.6
1997–98	Philadelphia	23	2	12.0	.381	.000	.875	.6	1.6	.3	.0	2.7
1998–99	Orlando	6	0	5.5	.500	.000	**1.000**	.3	.5	.2	.0	3.0
1998–99	New Jersey	8	1	21.8	.439	**.500**	.857	2.1	2.0	.4	**.1**	8.0
1998–99	Philadelphia	10	0	3.7	.333	.000	–	.2	.4	.1	.0	1.0
1999–00	Boston	48	0	9.0	.396	.357	.952	.7	1.1	.2	.0	3.2
2000–01	Boston	7	1	20.6	.341	.250	.636	2.1	2.7	.6	.0	5.4
2000–01	Charlotte	2	0	7.5	**1.000**	–	–	.0	.0	.5	.0	2.0
2000–01	New Jersey	12	9	**26.3**	.376	.313	.600	2.0	**4.4**	.3	.0	6.9
2001–02	L.A. Clippers	18	0	7.2	.318	.259	.571	.7	.7	.2	**.1**	2.2
2003–04	New Jersey	6	0	3.7	.375	–	**1.000**	.2	.7	.2	.0	1.3
2003–04	L.A. Clippers	55	11	18.4	.405	.130	.724	1.5	2.4	.5	.0	3.9
Career		499	62	14.6	.412	.319	.816	1.3	2.1	.4	.0	4.5

== Legal issues ==
On April 30, 2017, Overton was arrested and charged with indecent exposure and disorderly conduct, stemming from an incident in which witnesses told police he was exposing himself to hikers on the Cynwyd Heritage Trail in Lower Merion, Pennsylvania. Overton later pled guilty to disorderly conduct, and was placed on probation.
