= Jonathan Kerner =

American basketball player (born 1974)

Personal information
- Born: June 6, 1974 (age 52) Atlanta, Georgia, U.S.
- Listed height: 6 ft 11 in (2.11 m)
- Listed weight: 245 lb (111 kg)

Career information
- High school: St. Pius X (Atlanta, Georgia)
- College: Florida State (1992–1994); East Carolina (1995–1997)
- NBA draft: 1997: undrafted
- Playing career: 1998–2005
- Position: Power forward
- Number: 40

Career history
- 1998: Killarney BC
- 1998–1999: Sioux Falls Skyforce
- 1999: Orlando Magic
- 1999–2000: Sioux Falls Skyforce
- 2000: Rockford Lightning
- 2000–2001: Quad City Thunder
- 2001–2002: CSKA Moscow
- 2003: Columbus Riverdragons
- 2003: Greenville Groove
- 2004–2005: Hitachi SunRockers
- Stats at NBA.com
- Stats at Basketball Reference

Jonathan Kerner (born June 6, 1974) is an American former professional basketball player. After graduating from St. Pius X Catholic High School, the 6'11" center attended East Carolina University and Florida State University. He played one game for the NBA's Orlando Magic in 1999 while also appearing in the EuroLeague with CSKA Moscow in 2001. He signed with the New York Knicks in October 2000 and originally made the 15 man roster. After spending the first month on the injury list, he was waived on 27 November to make room for recently injured Charlie Ward.
