= William Cunningham (basketball) =

American basketball player

Personal information
- Born: March 25, 1974 (age 52) Augusta, Georgia, U.S.
- Listed height: 6 ft 11 in (2.11 m)
- Listed weight: 250 lb (113 kg)

Career information
- High school: Glenn Hills (Augusta, Georgia)
- College: Temple (1992–1996)
- NBA draft: 1996: undrafted
- Position: Center
- Number: 45, 50, 54, 51

Career history
- 1998: Utah Jazz
- 1998: Philadelphia 76ers
- 1999: Toronto Raptors
- 1999: New Jersey Nets
- Stats at NBA.com
- Stats at Basketball Reference

William Neal Cunningham (born March 25, 1974) is an American professional basketball player, formerly in the National Basketball Association (NBA).

A 6'11" center from Temple University, Cunningham played in 16 games for four different NBA teams from 1998 to 1999, He has played for the Utah Jazz (1998), Philadelphia 76ers (1998), Toronto Raptors (1999) and New Jersey Nets (1999). He was not drafted by an NBA team but was taken in the 1996 USBL Draft. He has also played professionally in China, Russia, Egypt and Uruguay.
