= 1999–2000 New York Knicks season =

Season of National Basketball Association team the New York Knicks

- Head coach: Jeff Van Gundy
- General manager: Scott Layden
- Owners: Cablevision
- Arena: Madison Square Garden

Results
- Record: 50–32 (.610)
- Place: Division: 2nd (Atlantic); Conference: 3rd (Eastern)
- Playoff finish: Eastern Conference finals (lost to Pacers 2–4)
- Stats at Basketball Reference

Local media
- Television: MSG Network
- Radio: WFAN

The 1999–2000 New York Knicks season was the 53rd season for the New York Knicks in the National Basketball Association. The Knicks entered the regular season as runner-ups of the 1999 NBA Finals, where despite losing to the San Antonio Spurs in five games, they became the first eighth seeded team to reach the NBA Finals.

== Season summary ==
=== Off-season ===
During the off-season, the team signed free agents John Wallace and Andrew Lang; Wallace previously played for the Knicks during the 1996–97 season.

=== Regular season ===
After advancing to the NBA Finals as the #8 seed last year, the Knicks won their first three games of the regular season, but then lost seven of their next ten games, as Patrick Ewing missed the first 20 games due to Achilles tendonitis. However, Ewing eventually returned as the team won 11 of their next 13 games, and later on held a 29–18 record at the All-Star break. The Knicks finished in second place in the Atlantic Division with a 50–32 record, and earned the third seed in the Eastern Conference; it was their first 50-win season since 1996–97, as the team qualified for the NBA playoffs for the 13th consecutive year.

Allan Houston averaged 19.7 points per game and led the Knicks with 106 three-point field goals, while Latrell Sprewell, who became the team's starting small forward after playing off the bench the previous season, averaged 18.6 points, 4.0 assists and 1.3 steals per game, and Ewing provided the team with 15.0 points, 9.7 rebounds and 1.4 blocks per game. In addition, Larry Johnson contributed 10.7 points and 5.4 rebounds per game, while Marcus Camby played a sixth man role off the bench, averaging 10.2 points, 7.8 rebounds and 2.0 blocks per game, but only played 59 games due to a knee injury. Meanwhile, Kurt Thomas provided with 8.0 points and 6.3 rebounds per game, Charlie Ward contributed 7.3 points, 4.2 assists and 1.3 steals per game, along with 102 three-point field goals, Wallace averaged 6.5 points per game, and Chris Childs contributed 5.3 points and 4.0 assists per game.

During the NBA All-Star weekend at The Arena in Oakland in Oakland, California, Houston was selected for the 2000 NBA All-Star Game, as a member of the Eastern Conference All-Star team, while head coach Jeff Van Gundy was selected to coach the Eastern Conference; it was Houston's first ever All-Star appearance. In addition, Houston also participated in the NBA 2Ball Competition, along with Becky Hammon of the WNBA's New York Liberty. Camby finished tied in sixth place in Sixth Man of the Year voting.

The Knicks finished fourth in the NBA in home-game attendance, with an attendance of 810,103 at Madison Square Garden during the regular season.

=== NBA playoffs ===
In the Eastern Conference First Round of the 2000 NBA playoffs, the Knicks faced off against the 6th–seeded Toronto Raptors, a team that featured All-Star guard Vince Carter, Tracy McGrady, and former Knicks guard Doug Christie. The Knicks won the first two games over the Raptors at home at Madison Square Garden, before winning Game 3 on the road, 87–80 at the Air Canada Centre to win the series in a three-game sweep.

In the Eastern Conference Semi-finals, and for the fourth consecutive year, the team faced off against the 2nd–seeded, and Atlantic Division champion Miami Heat, who were led by All-Star center, and Defensive Player of the Year, Alonzo Mourning, Jamal Mashburn and Tim Hardaway. With the series tied at 2–2, the Knicks lost Game 5 to the Heat on the road, 87–81 at the American Airlines Arena, as the Heat took a 3–2 series lead. However, the Knicks managed to win Game 6 over the Heat at Madison Square Garden, 72–70 to even the series, and then won Game 7 at the American Airlines Arena, 83–82 to win in a hard-fought seven-game series.

In the Eastern Conference Finals, and for the third consecutive year, the Knicks faced off against the top–seeded, and Central Division champion Indiana Pacers, who were led by Most Improved Player of the Year, Jalen Rose, All-Star guard Reggie Miller, and All-Star forward Dale Davis. The Knicks lost the first two games to the Pacers on the road at the Conseco Fieldhouse, before winning the next two games at home, which included a Game 4 win at Madison Square Garden, 91–89. However, the Knicks lost the next two games, including a Game 6 loss to the Pacers at Madison Square Garden, 93–80, thus losing the series in six games, and ending their hopes of reaching the Finals for a second straight year.

The Pacers would advance to the NBA Finals for the first time in franchise history, but would lose to the Los Angeles Lakers in six games in the 2000 NBA Finals.

=== Aftermath ===
This season marked an end of an era, as Ewing was traded to the Seattle SuperSonics in an off-season four-team trade, after fifteen seasons with the Knicks. Also following the season, Chris Dudley was traded to the Phoenix Suns, while Wallace was dealt to the Dallas Mavericks, and Lang was released to free agency.

The Knicks would not reach the Eastern Conference Finals again until 2025.

== Offseason ==
=== NBA draft ===
Round	Pick	Player	Position	Nationality	School/Club team
1	15	Frédéric Weis	C	France	Limoges (France)

== Roster ==
1999–2000 New York Knicks roster
Players

Pos.	No.	Player	Height	Weight	DOB	From
G	9	Rick Brunson	6 ft 4 in (1.93 m)	190 lb (86 kg)	1972–06–14	Temple
F/C	23	Marcus Camby	6 ft 11 in (2.11 m)	220 lb (100 kg)	1974–03–22	UMass
G	1	Chris Childs	6 ft 3 in (1.91 m)	195 lb (88 kg)	1967–11–20	Boise State
C	14	Chris Dudley	6 ft 11 in (2.11 m)	235 lb (107 kg)	1965–02–22	Yale
C	33	Patrick Ewing	7 ft 0 in (2.13 m)	240 lb (109 kg)	1962–08–05	Georgetown
G	20	Allan Houston	6 ft 6 in (1.98 m)	200 lb (91 kg)	1971–04–20	Tennessee
F	2	Larry Johnson	6 ft 6 in (1.98 m)	250 lb (113 kg)	1969–03–14	UNLV
C	28	Andrew Lang	6 ft 11 in (2.11 m)	245 lb (111 kg)	1966–06–28	Arkansas
G/F	8	Latrell Sprewell	6 ft 5 in (1.96 m)	190 lb (86 kg)	1970–09–08	Alabama
F/C	40	Kurt Thomas	6 ft 9 in (2.06 m)	240 lb (109 kg)	1972–10–04	TCU
G/F	44	John Wallace	6 ft 8 in (2.03 m)	225 lb (102 kg)	1974–02–09	Syracuse
G	21	Charlie Ward	6 ft 2 in (1.88 m)	190 lb (86 kg)	1970–10–12	Florida State
G/F	26	David Wingate	6 ft 5 in (1.96 m)	185 lb (84 kg)	1963–12–15	Georgetown

Coaches
Head coach
- Jeff Van Gundy
Assistant(s)
- Greg Brittenham
- Don Chaney
- Brendan Malone
- Jeff Nix
- Tom Thibodeau

Legend
- (DP) Unsigned draft pick
- (FA) Free agent
- (S) Suspended
- Injured

Roster
Updated: 2000-03-11

== Regular season ==
=== Standings ===
Atlantic Division	W	L	PCT	GB	Home	Road	Div
y-Miami Heat	52	30	.634	–	33–8	19–22	18–6
x-New York Knicks	50	32	.610	2	33–8	17–24	14–10
x-Philadelphia 76ers	49	33	.598	3	29–12	20–21	13–11
Orlando Magic	41	41	.500	11	26–15	15–26	12–13
Boston Celtics	35	47	.427	17	26–15	9–32	12–12
New Jersey Nets	31	51	.378	21	22–19	9–32	9–16
Washington Wizards	29	53	.354	23	17–24	12–29	7–17

#	Eastern Conference				
#	Team	W	L	PCT	GB
1	c-Indiana Pacers	56	26	.683	–
2	y-Miami Heat	52	30	.634	4
3	x-New York Knicks	50	32	.610	6
4	x-Charlotte Hornets	49	33	.598	7
5	x-Philadelphia 76ers	49	33	.598	7
6	x-Toronto Raptors	45	37	.549	11
7	x-Detroit Pistons	42	40	.512	14
8	x-Milwaukee Bucks	42	40	.512	14
9	Orlando Magic	41	41	.500	15
10	Boston Celtics	35	47	.427	21
11	Cleveland Cavaliers	32	50	.390	24
12	New Jersey Nets	31	51	.378	25
13	Washington Wizards	29	53	.354	27
14	Atlanta Hawks	28	54	.341	28
15	Chicago Bulls	17	65	.207	39

c – clinched conference title
y – clinched division title
x – clinched playoff spot

== Playoffs ==
2000 playoff game log
First Round: 3–0 (home: 2–0; road: 1–0)

Game	Date	Team	Score	High points	High rebounds	High assists	Location Attendance	Series
1	April 23	Toronto	W 92–88	Houston, Sprewell (21)	Patrick Ewing (9)	Charlie Ward (5)	Madison Square Garden; 19,763	1–0
2	April 26	Toronto	W 84–83	Latrell Sprewell (25)	Marcus Camby (13)	Allan Houston (4)	Madison Square Garden; 19,763	2–0
3	April 30	@ Toronto	W 87–80	Allan Houston (23)	Patrick Ewing (11)	Latrell Sprewell (6)	Air Canada Centre; 19,996	3–0

Conference semifinals: 4–3 (home: 2–1; road: 2–2)

Game	Date	Team	Score	High points	High rebounds	High assists	Location Attendance	Series
1	May 7	@ Miami	L 83–87	Allan Houston (21)	Marcus Camby (13)	Chris Childs (6)	American Airlines Arena; 20,053	0–1
2	May 9	@ Miami	W 82–76	Ewing, Ward (13)	Ewing, Johnson (8)	Latrell Sprewell (5)	American Airlines Arena; 20,078	1–1
3	May 12	Miami	L 76–77 (OT)	Allan Houston (24)	Patrick Ewing (9)	Charlie Ward (4)	Madison Square Garden; 19,763	1–2
4	May 14	Miami	W 91–83	Charlie Ward (20)	Patrick Ewing (11)	Latrell Sprewell (6)	Madison Square Garden; 19,763	2–2
5	May 17	@ Miami	L 81–87	Latrell Sprewell (24)	Patrick Ewing (11)	Latrell Sprewell (6)	American Airlines Arena; 20,021	2–3
6	May 19	Miami	W 72–70	Allan Houston (21)	Patrick Ewing (18)	Charlie Ward (4)	Madison Square Garden; 19,763	3–3
7	May 21	@ Miami	W 83–82	Latrell Sprewell (24)	Marcus Camby (12)	Latrell Sprewell (5)	American Airlines Arena; 20,063	4–3

Conference finals: 2–4 (home: 2–1; road: 0–3)

Game	Date	Team	Score	High points	High rebounds	High assists	Location Attendance	Series
1	May 23	@ Indiana	L 88–102	Latrell Sprewell (22)	Camby, Ewing (8)	Allan Houston (4)	Conseco Fieldhouse; 18,345	0–1
2	May 25	@ Indiana	L 84–88	Larry Johnson (25)	Marcus Camby (11)	Latrell Sprewell (6)	Conseco Fieldhouse; 18,345	0–2
3	May 27	Indiana	W 98–95	Latrell Sprewell (32)	Latrell Sprewell (8)	Charlie Ward (9)	Madison Square Garden; 19,763	1–2
4	May 29	Indiana	W 91–89	Larry Johnson (25)	Marcus Camby (8)	Charlie Ward (7)	Madison Square Garden; 19,763	2–2
5	May 31	@ Indiana	L 79–88	Allan Houston (25)	four players tied (7)	three players tied (1)	Conseco Fieldhouse; 18,345	2–3
6	June 2	Indiana	L 80–93	Latrell Sprewell (32)	Patrick Ewing (12)	Charlie Ward (6)	Madison Square Garden; 19,763	2–4

2000 schedule

== Player statistics ==
Legend
GP	Games played	GS	Games started	MPG	Minutes per game
FG%	Field-goal percentage	3P%	3-point field-goal percentage	FT%	Free-throw percentage
RPG	Rebounds per game	APG	Assists per game	SPG	Steals per game
BPG	Blocks per game	PPG	Points per game

=== Regular season ===
Player	GP	GS	MPG	FG%	3P%	FT%	RPG	APG	SPG	BPG	PPG
Etdrick Bohannon^{†}	2	0	2.5			.750	.5	.0	.0	.0	1.5
Rick Brunson	37	0	7.8	.414	.154	.611	.7	1.3	.2	.0	1.9
Marcus Camby	59	11	26.2	.480	.500	.670	7.8	.8	.7	2.0	10.2
Chris Childs	71	2	23.6	.409	.356	.797	2.1	4.0	.5	.1	5.3
Chris Dudley	47	3	9.8	.343		.333	2.9	.1	.1	.4	1.2
Patrick Ewing	62	62	32.8	.466	.000	.731	9.7	.9	.6	1.4	15.0
Allan Houston	82	82	38.6	.483	.436	.838	3.3	2.7	.8	.2	19.7
DeMarco Johnson	5	0	7.4	.333			1.4	.0	.2	.0	1.2
Larry Johnson	70	68	32.6	.433	.333	.766	5.4	2.5	.6	.1	10.7
Andrew Lang	19	10	12.8	.438		.429	3.2	.2	.4	.3	3.1
Latrell Sprewell	82	82	40.0	.435	.346	.866	4.3	4.0	1.3	.3	18.6
Kurt Thomas	80	21	24.6	.505	.333	.781	6.3	1.0	.6	.5	8.0
Mirsad Türkcan^{†}	7	0	3.6	.200	.000		1.4	.1	.3	.0	.6
John Wallace	60	0	13.3	.467	.000	.804	2.3	.4	.2	.2	6.5
Charlie Ward	72	69	27.6	.423	.386	.828	3.2	4.2	1.3	.2	7.3
David Wingate	7	0	4.6	.111			.3	.4	.1	.3	.3

=== Playoffs ===
Player	GP	GS	MPG	FG%	3P%	FT%	RPG	APG	SPG	BPG	PPG
Rick Brunson	3	0	1.3	.000			.0	.3	.3	.0	.0
Marcus Camby	16	0	24.1	.337	.000	.613	7.0	.4	.5	1.4	4.8
Chris Childs	16	0	20.9	.386	.321	.857	2.3	2.4	.4	.0	5.4
Chris Dudley	5	2	8.6	.500		1.000	2.4	.4	.2	.2	.8
Patrick Ewing	14	14	32.9	.418		.697	9.5	.4	1.1	1.4	14.6
Allan Houston	16	16	40.9	.438	.500	.862	3.3	1.6	1.2	.2	17.6
Larry Johnson	16	16	36.8	.461	.394	.794	5.0	1.6	.5	.1	11.3
Latrell Sprewell	16	16	43.8	.414	.333	.784	4.4	3.6	1.1	.3	18.7
Kurt Thomas	16	0	15.7	.508		.700	3.1	.3	.2	.4	4.3
John Wallace	1	0	4.0	.000			1.0	.0	1.0	.0	.0
Charlie Ward	16	16	27.4	.504	.396	.714	4.3	4.1	1.4	.3	9.4

- ^{†} Denotes player spent time with another team in the season. Stats reflect time with the Knicks only.

Player statistics citation:
