= 1999–2000 Indiana Pacers season =

NBA professional basketball team season

- Conference champions
- Division champions
- Head coach: Larry Bird
- President: Donnie Walsh
- General manager: Donnie Walsh
- Owners: Herbert Simon; Melvin Simon
- Arena: Conseco Fieldhouse

Results
- Record: 56–26 (.683)
- Place: Division: 1st (Central); Conference: 1st (Eastern)
- Playoff finish: NBA Finals (lost to Lakers 2–4)
- Stats at Basketball Reference

Local media
- Television: Fox Sports Net Midwest, WTTV
- Radio: WIBC

The 1999–2000 Indiana Pacers season was the 24th season for the Indiana Pacers in the National Basketball Association, and their 33rd season as a franchise.

== Season summary ==
=== Off-season ===
This was the Pacers' first season playing at their new arena, the Conseco Fieldhouse. During the off-season, the team acquired rookie small forward, first-round draft pick and high school basketball star Jonathan Bender from the Toronto Raptors, and acquired rookie center, and first-round draft pick Jeff Foster out of Texas State University from the Golden State Warriors.

=== Regular season ===
The Pacers played around .500 in winning percentage with a 7–7 start to the regular season, but then won 15 of their next 17 games, which included a seven-game winning streak between December and January, and later on held a 32–16 record at the All-Star break. The team won 11 of their 13 games in February, and won nine of their final eleven games of the season. The Pacers finished in first place in the Central Division with a 56–26 record, which earned them the first seed in the Eastern Conference in the NBA playoffs, and guaranteed home-court advantage throughout the Eastern Conference playoffs for the first time in franchise history. The team also posted a franchise-best 25-game winning streak at home at the Conseco Fieldhouse during the regular season.

Jalen Rose, who played the previous three seasons off the Pacers' bench, became the team's starting small forward replacing Chris Mullin in the starting lineup, averaging 18.2 points and 4.0 assists per game, and was named the NBA Most Improved Player of the Year. In addition, Reggie Miller averaged 18.1 points per game, and led the Pacers with 165 three-point field goals, while Rik Smits provided the team with 12.9 points, 5.1 rebounds and 1.3 blocks per game, Dale Davis contributed 10.0 points and 9.9 rebounds per game, and Mark Jackson provided with 8.1 points and 8.0 assists per game. Off the bench, Austin Croshere played an increased role as the team's sixth man, averaging 10.3 points and 6.4 rebounds per game, while Travis Best contributed 8.9 points and 3.3 assists per game, Sam Perkins averaged 6.6 points and 3.6 rebounds per game, and second-year forward Al Harrington provided with 6.6 points and 3.2 rebounds per game.

During the NBA All-Star weekend at The Arena in Oakland in Oakland, California, Miller and Davis were both selected for the 2000 NBA All-Star Game, as members of the Eastern Conference All-Star team; it was Miller's fifth and final All-Star appearance, and the first and only All-Star appearance for Davis. Rose and Miller both finished tied in 13th place in Most Valuable Player voting, while Croshere finished in fourth place in Most Improved Player voting.

The Pacers finished tenth in the NBA in home-game attendance, with an attendance of 752,145 at the Conseco Fieldhouse during the regular season.

=== NBA playoffs ===
In the Eastern Conference First Round of the 2000 NBA playoffs, and for the second consecutive year, the Pacers faced off against the 8th–seeded Milwaukee Bucks, who were led by the trio of All-Star guard Ray Allen, All-Star forward Glenn Robinson, and Sam Cassell. The Pacers took a 2–1 series lead before losing Game 4 to the Bucks on the road, 100–87 at the Bradley Center. With the series tied at 2–2, the Pacers won Game 5 over the Bucks at home, 96–95 at the Conseco Fieldhouse, in which Miller scored 41 points, as the Pacers defeated the Bucks in a hard-fought five-game series.

In the Eastern Conference Semi-finals, and also for the second consecutive year, the team faced off against the 5th–seeded Philadelphia 76ers, a team that featured All-Star guard Allen Iverson, Tyrone Hill, and defensive shot-blocker Theo Ratliff. The Pacers took a 3–0 series lead, but then lost the next two games to the 76ers, which included a Game 5 home loss at the Conseco Fieldhouse, 107–86; Miller was suspended for Game 5 due to his altercation with 76ers center Matt Geiger in Game 4. However, the Pacers won Game 6 over the 76ers on the road, 106–90 at the First Union Center to win the series in six games.

In the Eastern Conference Finals, the Pacers then faced off against their arch-rivals, the 3rd–seeded New York Knicks, who were led by All-Star guard Allan Houston, Latrell Sprewell and Patrick Ewing; it was the third consecutive year, and the sixth time in the last eight years that the Pacers played against the Knicks during the NBA playoffs. The Pacers won the first two games over the Knicks at the Conseco Fieldhouse, before losing the next two games on the road, as the Knicks won Game 4 at Madison Square Garden, 91–89 to even the series at 2–2. However, the Pacers managed to win the next two games, including a Game 6 win over the Knicks at Madison Square Garden, 93–80 to win the series in six games, and advance to the NBA Finals for the first time in franchise history.

In the 2000 NBA Finals, the Pacers faced off against the top–seeded Los Angeles Lakers, who were led by the trio of All-Star center, and Most Valuable Player of the Year, Shaquille O'Neal, All-Star guard Kobe Bryant, and Glen Rice. The Pacers lost the first two games on the road at the Staples Center, as the Lakers took a 2–0 series lead. However, the Pacers managed to win Game 3 at home, 100–91 at the Conseco Fieldhouse, but then lost Game 4 at home to the Lakers in overtime, 120–118. The Pacers won Game 5 at the Conseco Fieldhouse, 120–87, but then lost Game 6 to the Lakers at the Staples Center, 116–111, thus losing the series in six games.

=== Aftermath ===
Following the season, Larry Bird resigned as head coach after three seasons with the Pacers. Meanwhile, Davis was traded to the Portland Trail Blazers, Mullin was released and later re-signed as a free agent with his former team, the Golden State Warriors, Jackson signed with the Toronto Raptors, and Smits retired after twelve seasons in the NBA with the Pacers.

The Pacers would not return to the NBA Finals again until the 2024–25 season, where they lost in seven games to the Oklahoma City Thunder in the 2025 NBA Finals.

== Offseason ==
=== NBA draft ===
Round	Pick	Player	Position	Nationality	College
1	26	Vonteego Cummings	PG	United States	Pittsburgh

== Roster ==
1999–2000 Indiana Pacers roster
Players

Pos.	No.	Player	Height	Weight	DOB	From
SF	24	Jonathan Bender	6 ft 11 in (2.11 m)	202 lb (92 kg)	1981–01–30	Picayune Memorial HS (MS)
PG	4	Travis Best	5 ft 11 in (1.80 m)	182 lb (83 kg)	1972–07–12	Georgia Tech
PF	44	Austin Croshere	6 ft 9 in (2.06 m)	235 lb (107 kg)	1975–05–01	Providence
PF	32	Dale Davis	6 ft 11 in (2.11 m)	230 lb (104 kg)	1969–03–25	Clemson
C	10	Jeff Foster	6 ft 11 in (2.11 m)	250 lb (113 kg)	1977–01–16	Texas State
PF	3	Al Harrington	6 ft 9 in (2.06 m)	230 lb (104 kg)	1980–02–17	St. Patrick HS (NJ)
PG	13	Mark Jackson	6 ft 1 in (1.85 m)	180 lb (82 kg)	1965–04–01	St. John's
SF	9	Derrick McKey	6 ft 9 in (2.06 m)	205 lb (93 kg)	1966–10–10	Alabama
SG	31	Reggie Miller	6 ft 7 in (2.01 m)	185 lb (84 kg)	1965–08–24	UCLA
SG	17	Chris Mullin	6 ft 6 in (1.98 m)	200 lb (91 kg)	1963–07–30	St. John's
PF	14	Sam Perkins	6 ft 9 in (2.06 m)	235 lb (107 kg)	1961–06–14	North Carolina
SF	5	Jalen Rose	6 ft 8 in (2.03 m)	210 lb (95 kg)	1973–01–30	Michigan
C	45	Rik Smits	7 ft 4 in (2.24 m)	250 lb (113 kg)	1966–08–23	Marist
C	55	Žan Tabak	7 ft 0 in (2.13 m)	245 lb (111 kg)	1970–06–15	Croatia

Coaches
Head coach
- Larry Bird
Assistant(s)
- Rick Carlisle
- Dick Harter

Legend
- (DP) Unsigned draft pick
- (FA) Free agent
- (S) Suspended
- Injured

Roster
Updated: 1999-10-31

== Regular season ==
The Pacers began a new era by moving into Conseco Fieldhouse after 25 years at Market Square Arena. They would start the season with a 7-7 record but finished with a 56-26 record, good enough to win their 2nd straight division title. The Pacers even won 25 straight games at their new arena.

=== Season standings ===
Central Division	W	L	PCT	GB	Home	Road	Div
y-Indiana Pacers	56	26	.683	–	36–5	20–21	20–8
x-Charlotte Hornets	49	33	.598	7	30–11	19–22	20–8
x-Toronto Raptors	45	37	.549	11	26–15	19–22	16–12
x-Detroit Pistons	42	40	.512	14	27–14	15–26	16–12
x-Milwaukee Bucks	42	40	.512	14	23–18	19–22	16–12
Cleveland Cavaliers	32	50	.390	24	22–19	10–31	8–20
Atlanta Hawks	28	54	.341	28	21–20	7–34	11–17
Chicago Bulls	17	65	.207	39	12–29	5–36	5–23

#	Eastern Conference				
#	Team	W	L	PCT	GB
1	c-Indiana Pacers	56	26	.683	–
2	y-Miami Heat	52	30	.634	4
3	x-New York Knicks	50	32	.610	6
4	x-Charlotte Hornets	49	33	.598	7
5	x-Philadelphia 76ers	49	33	.598	7
6	x-Toronto Raptors	45	37	.549	11
7	x-Detroit Pistons	42	40	.512	14
8	x-Milwaukee Bucks	42	40	.512	14
9	Orlando Magic	41	41	.500	15
10	Boston Celtics	35	47	.427	21
11	Cleveland Cavaliers	32	50	.390	24
12	New Jersey Nets	31	51	.378	25
13	Washington Wizards	29	53	.354	27
14	Atlanta Hawks	28	54	.341	28
15	Chicago Bulls	17	65	.207	39

=== Game log ===
1999–2000 game log
Total: 56–26 (home: 36–5; road: 20–21)
November: 8–7 (home: 4–2; road: 4–5)

Game	Date	Team	Score	High points	High rebounds	High assists	Location Attendance	Record
1	November 2	@ New Jersey	W 119–112	Reggie Miller (27)	Dale Davis (13)	Mark Jackson (5)	Continental Airlines Arena; 13,051	1–0
2	November 4	@ Charlotte	L 89–98	Reggie Miller (20)	Davis, Rose (7)	Mark Jackson (7)	Charlotte Coliseum; 15,762	1–1
3	November 6	Boston	W 115–108	Reggie Miller (29)	Dale Davis (11)	Mark Jackson (8)	Conseco Fieldhouse; 18,345	2–1
4	November 9	@ Miami	L 101–113	Jalen Rose (17)	Dale Davis (10)	Mark Jackson (4)	Miami Arena; 15,200	2–2
5	November 11	Orlando	W 116–101	Reggie Miller (21)	Jalen Rose (8)	Jalen Rose (7)	Conseco Fieldhouse; 18,345	3–2
6	November 13	Washington	W 105–83	Jalen Rose (16)	Dale Davis (8)	Best, Jackson (6)	Conseco Fieldhouse; 18,345	4–2
7	November 15	@ Houston	W 96–87	Al Harrington (18)	Dale Davis (11)	Mark Jackson (7)	Compaq Center; 14,866	5–2
8	November 16	@ San Antonio	L 87–90 (OT)	Jalen Rose (28)	Dale Davis (10)	three players tied (4)	Alamodome; 15,905	5–3
9	November 19	Atlanta	L 99–105	Miller, Smits (21)	Al Harrington (8)	Mark Jackson (12)	Conseco Fieldhouse; 18,345	5–4
10	November 20	@ Cleveland	W 107–98	Jalen Rose (22)	Austin Croshere (8)	Jackson, Rose (9)	Gund Arena; 13,806	6–4
11	November 22	@ Boston	L 85–95	Dale Davis (19)	Dale Davis (12)	Mark Jackson (8)	FleetCenter; 15,728	6–5
12	November 25	Detroit	L 99–107	Rik Smits (23)	Dale Davis (8)	Mark Jackson (10)	Conseco Fieldhouse; 18,345	6–6
13	November 26	Vancouver	W 105–86	Rik Smits (17)	Croshere, Smits (5)	Travis Best (6)	Conseco Fieldhouse; 18,345	7–6
14	November 28	@ Seattle	L 91–102	Dale Davis (19)	Dale Davis (15)	Travis Best (5)	Key Arena; 14,644	7–7
15	November 29	@ Portland	W 93–91	Jalen Rose (22)	Dale Davis (12)	Mark Jackson (9)	Rose Garden; 20,049	8–7

December: 12–2 (home: 8–0; road: 4–2)

Game	Date	Team	Score	High points	High rebounds	High assists	Location Attendance	Record
16	December 1	@ Vancouver	W 96–89	Reggie Miller (26)	Austin Croshere (9)	Mark Jackson (10)	General Motors Place; 11,683	9–7
17	December 3	@ Utah	W 100–75	Reggie Miller (31)	Dale Davis (13)	Mark Jackson (9)	Delta Center; 19,084	10–7
18	December 7	San Antonio	W 83–77	Reggie Miller (23)	Dale Davis (16)	Mark Jackson (9)	Conseco Fieldhouse; 18,345	11–7
19	December 10	Cleveland	W 136–88	Rik Smits (25)	Dale Davis (20)	Reggie Miller (8)	Conseco Fieldhouse; 18,345	13–7
20	December 11	L.A. Clippers	W 108–90	Reggie Miller (26)	Dale Davis (18)	Mark Jackson (9)	Conseco Fieldhouse; 18,345	14–7
21	December 14	@ Toronto	L 97–105	Jalen Rose (21)	Dale Davis (10)	Travis Best (7)	Air Canada Centre; 15,774	13–8
22	December 15	Chicago	W 102–91	Austin Croshere (21)	Rik Smits (8)	Mark Jackson (5)	Conseco Fieldhouse; 18,345	14–8
23	December 17	Utah	W 89–74	Reggie Miller (19)	Austin Croshere (11)	Mark Jackson (6)	Conseco Fieldhouse; 18,345	15–8
24	December 18	@ Milwaukee	L 95–109	Reggie Miller (21)	Dale Davis (15)	Mark Jackson (10)	Bradley Center; 15,236	15–9
25	December 21	Seattle	W 113–103	Reggie Miller (31)	Dale Davis (9)	Jackson, Rose (11)	Conseco Fieldhouse; 18,345	16–9
26	December 25	New York	W 101–90	Reggie Miller (26)	Austin Croshere (10)	Mark Jackson (7)	Conseco Fieldhouse; 18,345	17–9
27	December 27	@ Chicago	W 103–91	Dale Davis (21)	Dale Davis (8)	Mark Jackson (13)	United Center; 22,169	18–9
28	December 29	@ Atlanta	W 116–89	Reggie Miller (25)	Dale Davis (12)	Mark Jackson (14)	Philips Arena; 16,117	19–9
29	December 30	Charlotte	W 109–99	Reggie Miller (30)	Dale Davis (11)	Mark Jackson (11)	Conseco Fieldhouse; 18,345	20–9

January: 8–6 (home: 6–0; road: 2–6)

Game	Date	Team	Score	High points	High rebounds	High assists	Location Attendance	Record
30	January 4	New Jersey	W 116–111	Reggie Miller (24)	Rik Smits (9)	Mark Jackson (15)	Conseco Fieldhouse; 18,345	21–9
31	January 6	@ Denver	W 102–87	Reggie Miller (20)	three players tied (7)	Mark Jackson (10)	Pepsi Center; 14,569	22–9
32	January 8	@ L.A. Clippers	L 94–107	Travis Best (20)	three players tied (6)	Mark Jackson (6)	Staples Center; 17,004	22–10
33	January 9	@ Sacramento	L 113–116	Austin Croshere (22)	Dale Davis (12)	Travis Best (8)	ARCO Arena; 17,317	22–11
34	January 12	Washington	W 117–102	Jalen Rose (25)	Dale Davis (13)	Mark Jackson (13)	Conseco Fieldhouse; 18,345	23–11
35	January 14	L.A. Lakers	W 111–102	Reggie Miller (22)	Austin Croshere (12)	Mark Jackson (8)	Conseco Fieldhouse; 18,345	24–11
36	January 15	@ Orlando	W 96–89	Austin Croshere (14)	Dale Davis (11)	Jalen Rose (6)	Orlando Arena; 14,456	25–11
37	January 17	@ Minnesota	L 100–101	Rik Smits (20)	Austin Croshere (13)	Mark Jackson (11)	Target Center; 16,731	25–12
38	January 19	Milwaukee	W 106–84	Reggie Miller (29)	Dale Davis (13)	Mark Jackson (12)	Conseco Fieldhouse; 18,345	26–12
39	January 21	@ Washington	L 113–123	Miller, Rose (21)	Dale Davis (9)	Mark Jackson (13)	MCI Center; 17,055	26–13
40	January 22	@ Philadelphia	L 97–103	Reggie Miller (28)	Dale Davis (15)	Mark Jackson (9)	First Union Center; 20,623	26–14
41	January 24	@ Chicago	L 82–83	Jalen Rose (18)	Dale Davis (11)	Mark Jackson (12)	United Center; 21,911	26–15
42	January 25	Phoenix	W 93–87	Reggie Miller (21)	Davis, Rose (9)	Mark Jackson (8)	Conseco Fieldhouse; 18,345	27–15
43	January 29	Miami	W 94–84	Reggie Miller (30)	Croshere, Davis (6)	Mark Jackson (8)	Conseco Fieldhouse; 18,345	28–15

February: 11–2 (home: 8–0; road: 3–2)

Game	Date	Team	Score	High points	High rebounds	High assists	Location Attendance	Record
44	February 1	Boston	W 99–96	Rik Smits (26)	Dale Davis (14)	Mark Jackson (7)	Conseco Fieldhouse; 18,345	29–15
45	February 4	Sacramento	W 104–94	Jalen Rose (22)	Dale Davis (13)	Mark Jackson (15)	Conseco Fieldhouse; 18,345	30–15
46	February 5	@ Orlando	L 102–107	Jalen Rose (25)	Dale Davis (14)	three players tied (4)	Orlando Arena; 15,421	30–16
47	February 7	Philadelphia	W 109–84	Reggie Miller (32)	Jalen Rose (7)	McKey, Rose (6)	Conseco Fieldhouse; 18,345	31–16
48	February 9	@ Boston	W 113–104	Jalen Rose (23)	Dale Davis (11)	Mark Jackson (9)	FleetCenter; 18,328	32–16
All-Star Break
49	February 16	Toronto	W 109–101	Jalen Rose (32)	Dale Davis (13)	Mark Jackson (15)	Conseco Fieldhouse; 18,345	33–16
50	February 17	@ Milwaukee	W 92–90	Reggie Miller (23)	three players tied (9)	Mark Jackson (9)	Bradley Center; 14,376	34–16
51	February 19	@ New York	L 73–87	Reggie Miller (16)	Dale Davis (16)	Mark Jackson (6)	Madison Square Garden; 19,763	34–17
52	February 21	Dallas	W 94–93	Jalen Rose (28)	Davis, McKey (8)	Mark Jackson (6)	Conseco Fieldhouse; 18,345	35–17
53	February 23	@ Detroit	W 118–111	Rik Smits (29)	Rik Smits (9)	Mark Jackson (14)	The Palace of Auburn Hills; 16,371	36–17
54	February 24	Chicago	W 100–83	Jalen Rose (22)	Derrick McKey (10)	Mark Jackson (7)	Conseco Fieldhouse; 18,345	37–17
55	February 26	Golden State	W 104–88	Jalen Rose (29)	Sam Perkins (7)	Mark Jackson (9)	Conseco Fieldhouse; 18,345	38–17
56	February 29	Detroit	W 115–105	Reggie Miller (24)	Rik Smits (12)	Mark Jackson (13)	Conseco Fieldhouse; 18,345	39–17

March: 9–7 (home: 6–3; road: 3–4)

Game	Date	Team	Score	High points	High rebounds	High assists	Location Attendance	Record
57	March 2	@ Phoenix	L 87–118	Travis Best (20)	Croshere, Davis (9)	Mark Jackson (8)	America West Arena; 19,023	39–18
58	March 3	@ L.A. Lakers	L 92–107	Reggie Miller (22)	Dale Davis (13)	Mark Jackson (6)	Staples Center; 18,997	39–19
59	March 5	@ Golden State	W 114–95	Austin Croshere (18)	Dale Davis (8)	Mark Jackson (8)	The Arena in Oakland; 15,283	40–19
60	March 7	Denver	W 90–89	Jalen Rose (19)	Dale Davis (11)	Jalen Rose (9)	Conseco Fieldhouse; 18,345	41–19
61	March 9	Portland	W 127–119 (OT)	Mark Jackson (23)	Dale Davis (13)	Mark Jackson (9)	Conseco Fieldhouse; 18,345	42–19
62	March 10	@ Cleveland	W 95–92	Reggie Miller (28)	McKey, Smits (8)	Mark Jackson (9)	Gund Arena; 20,562	43–19
63	March 12	Miami	L 96–105	Reggie Miller (26)	Dale Davis (8)	Mark Jackson (7)	Conseco Fieldhouse; 18,345	43–20
64	March 14	@ Dallas	L 90–111	Travis Best (26)	Croshere, Rose (13)	Travis Best (5)	Reunion Arena; 15,761	43–21
65	March 15	@ Atlanta	W 113–107	Jalen Rose (32)	Austin Croshere (11)	Mark Jackson (10)	Philips Arena; 14,454	44–21
66	March 17	Houston	W 111–102	Jalen Rose (35)	Austin Croshere (13)	Mark Jackson (8)	Conseco Fieldhouse; 18,345	45–21
67	March 18	Charlotte	W 113–99	Jalen Rose (22)	Rik Smits (12)	Mark Jackson (9)	Conseco Fieldhouse; 18,345	46–21
68	March 21	New York	W 95–91	Jalen Rose (28)	Austin Croshere (8)	Mark Jackson (7)	Conseco Fieldhouse; 18,345	47–21
69	March 23	Milwaukee	L 84–105	Jalen Rose (22)	Austin Croshere (7)	Mark Jackson (5)	Conseco Fieldhouse; 18,345	47–22
70	March 26	Philadelphia	L 101–111	Jalen Rose (19)	Rik Smits (7)	Best, Jackson (5)	Conseco Fieldhouse; 18,345	47–23
71	March 28	@ New Jersey	L 106–111	Jalen Rose (27)	Austin Croshere (10)	Mark Jackson (11)	Continental Airlines Arena; 17,676	47–24
72	March 31	Minnesota	W 109–85	Travis Best (27)	Davis, Perkins (9)	Travis Best (7)	Conseco Fieldhouse; 18,345	48–24

April: 8–2 (home: 4–0; road: 4–2)

Game	Date	Team	Score	High points	High rebounds	High assists	Location Attendance	Record
73	April 2	@ Toronto	W 104–83	Jalen Rose (23)	Davis, Perkins (7)	Mark Jackson (10)	Air Canada Centre; 19,800	49–24
74	April 5	New Jersey	W 105–101	Rik Smits (25)	Dale Davis (11)	Mark Jackson (8)	Conseco Fieldhouse; 18,345	50–24
75	April 7	Cleveland	W 95–94	Jalen Rose (26)	Jalen Rose (13)	Mark Jackson (6)	Conseco Fieldhouse; 18,345	51–24
76	April 9	@ Charlotte	L 80–96	Jalen Rose (18)	Dale Davis (14)	Mark Jackson (8)	Charlotte Coliseum; 19,312	51–25
77	April 10	@ New York	L 81–83	Mark Jackson (13)	Dale Davis (12)	Mark Jackson (5)	Madison Square Garden; 19,763	51–26
78	April 12	Toronto	W 77–73	Jalen Rose (24)	Dale Davis (14)	Jackson, Rose (4)	Conseco Fieldhouse; 18,345	52–26
79	April 14	@ Miami	W 105–101	Reggie Miller (26)	Dale Davis (7)	Mark Jackson (5)	American Airlines Arena; 19,821	53–26
80	April 16	@ Detroit	W 112–101	Reggie Miller (21)	Dale Davis (15)	Mark Jackson (9)	The Palace of Auburn Hills; 17,629	54–26
81	April 17	@ Philadelphia	W 92–90	Chris Mullin (21)	Rik Smits (10)	Jalen Rose (9)	First Union Center; 20,797	55–26
82	April 19	Atlanta	W 111–92	Jalen Rose (19)	Jeff Foster (13)	Mark Jackson (8)	Conseco Fieldhouse; 18,345	56–26

1999–00 schedule

== Playoffs ==
2000 playoff game log
Eastern Conference First Round: 3–2 (home: 2–1; road: 1–1)

Game	Date	Team	Score	High points	High rebounds	High assists	Location Attendance	Series
1	April 23	Milwaukee	W 88–85	Jalen Rose (26)	Dale Davis (17)	Mark Jackson (11)	Conseco Fieldhouse; 18,345	1–0
2	April 27	Milwaukee	L 91–104	Austin Croshere (16)	Dale Davis (12)	Mark Jackson (5)	Conseco Fieldhouse; 18,345	1–1
3	April 29	@ Milwaukee	W 109–96	Reggie Miller (34)	Austin Croshere (11)	Miller, Rose (5)	Bradley Center; 18,717	2–1
4	May 1	@ Milwaukee	L 87–100	Jalen Rose (17)	Dale Davis (10)	Mark Jackson (6)	Bradley Center; 18,072	2–2
5	May 4	Milwaukee	W 96–95	Reggie Miller (41)	Dale Davis (12)	Mark Jackson (8)	Conseco Fieldhouse; 18,345	3–2

Eastern Conference Semifinals: 4–2 (home: 2–1; road: 2–1)

Game	Date	Team	Score	High points	High rebounds	High assists	Location Attendance	Series
1	May 6	Philadelphia	W 108–91	Miller, Rose (40)	Austin Croshere (11)	Mark Jackson (10)	Conseco Fieldhouse; 18,345	1–0
2	May 8	Philadelphia	W 103–97	Jalen Rose (30)	Jalen Rose (7)	Mark Jackson (14)	Conseco Fieldhouse; 18,345	2–0
3	May 10	@ Philadelphia	W 97–89	Reggie Miller (29)	Dale Davis (17)	Mark Jackson (8)	First Union Center; 20,823	3–0
4	May 13	@ Philadelphia	L 90–92	Rik Smits (20)	Dale Davis (11)	Mark Jackson (7)	First Union Center; 20,675	3–1
5	May 15	Philadelphia	L 86–107	Rik Smits (15)	Dale Davis (8)	Jackson, Rose (6)	Conseco Fieldhouse; 18,345	3–2
6	May 19	@ Philadelphia	W 106–90	Reggie Miller (25)	Dale Davis (11)	Mark Jackson (11)	First Union Center; 20,969	4–2

Eastern Conference Finals: 4–2 (home: 3–0; road: 1–2)

Game	Date	Team	Score	High points	High rebounds	High assists	Location Attendance	Series
1	May 23	New York	W 102–88	Austin Croshere (22)	Dale Davis (16)	Mark Jackson (13)	Conseco Fieldhouse; 18,345	1–0
2	May 25	New York	W 88–84	Jalen Rose (24)	Dale Davis (16)	Mark Jackson (5)	Conseco Fieldhouse; 18,345	2–0
3	May 27	@ New York	L 95–98	Jalen Rose (26)	Dale Davis (16)	Jackson, Rose (6)	Madison Square Garden; 19,763	2–1
4	May 29	@ New York	L 89–91	Reggie Miller (24)	Dale Davis (11)	Mark Jackson (7)	Madison Square Garden; 19,763	2–2
5	May 31	New York	W 88–79	Travis Best (24)	Derrick McKey (9)	Mark Jackson (7)	Conseco Fieldhouse; 18,345	3–2
6	June 2	@ New York	W 93–80	Reggie Miller (34)	Dale Davis (16)	Best, Jackson (4)	Madison Square Garden; 19,763	4–2

NBA Finals: 2–4 (home: 2–1; road: 0–3)

Game	Date	Team	Score	High points	High rebounds	High assists	Location Attendance	Series
1	June 7	@ L.A. Lakers	L 87–104	Mark Jackson (18)	Dale Davis (8)	Mark Jackson (7)	Staples Center; 18,997	0–1
2	June 9	@ L.A. Lakers	L 104–111	Jalen Rose (30)	Dale Davis (10)	Mark Jackson (8)	Staples Center; 18,997	0–2
3	June 11	L.A. Lakers	W 100–91	Reggie Miller (33)	Dale Davis (12)	Mark Jackson (6)	Conseco Fieldhouse; 18,345	1–2
4	June 14	L.A. Lakers	L 118–120 (OT)	Reggie Miller (35)	Dale Davis (8)	Mark Jackson (7)	Conseco Fieldhouse; 18,345	1–3
5	June 16	L.A. Lakers	W 120–87	Jalen Rose (32)	Austin Croshere (9)	Mark Jackson (7)	Conseco Fieldhouse; 18,345	2–3
6	June 19	@ L.A. Lakers	L 111–116	Jalen Rose (29)	Dale Davis (14)	Mark Jackson (11)	Staples Center; 18,997	2–4

2000 schedule

== Player statistics ==
=== Regular season ===
Player	POS	GP	GS	MP	REB	AST	STL	BLK	PTS	MPG	RPG	APG	SPG	BPG	PPG
Travis Best	PG	82	0	1,691	142	272	76	5	733	20.6	1.7	3.3	.9	.1	8.9
Reggie Miller	SG	81	81	2,987	239	187	85	25	1,470	36.9	3.0	2.3	1.0	.3	18.1
Mark Jackson	PG	81	81	2,190	296	650	76	10	660	27.0	3.7	8.0	.9	.1	8.1
Austin Croshere	PF	81	14	1,885	516	89	44	60	835	23.3	6.4	1.1	.5	.7	10.3
Sam Perkins	PF	81	0	1,620	289	68	31	33	537	20.0	3.6	.8	.4	.4	6.6
Jalen Rose	SF	80	80	2,978	387	320	84	49	1,457	37.2	4.8	4.0	1.1	.6	18.2
Rik Smits	C	79	79	1,852	401	85	20	100	1,018	23.4	5.1	1.1	.3	1.3	12.9
Dale Davis	PF	74	72	2,127	729	64	52	94	743	28.7	9.9	.9	.7	1.3	10.0
Al Harrington	PF	50	0	854	159	38	25	9	328	17.1	3.2	.8	.5	.2	6.6
Chris Mullin	SG	47	2	582	76	37	28	9	242	12.4	1.6	.8	.6	.2	5.1
Derrick McKey	SF	32	0	634	135	35	29	13	139	19.8	4.2	1.1	.9	.4	4.3
Jonathan Bender	SF	24	1	130	21	3	1	5	64	5.4	.9	.1	.0	.2	2.7
Jeff Foster	C	19	0	86	32	5	5	1	43	4.5	1.7	.3	.3	.1	2.3
Žan Tabak	C	18	0	114	32	4	3	9	37	6.3	1.8	.2	.2	.5	2.1

=== Playoffs ===
Player	POS	GP	GS	MP	REB	AST	STL	BLK	PTS	MPG	RPG	APG	SPG	BPG	PPG
Jalen Rose	SF	23	23	964	101	78	16	11	479	41.9	4.4	3.4	.7	.5	20.8
Dale Davis	C	23	23	714	263	17	11	31	190	31.0	11.4	.7	.5	1.3	8.3
Mark Jackson	PG	23	23	634	86	178	19	2	187	27.6	3.7	7.7	.8	.1	8.1
Austin Croshere	PF	23	2	490	109	19	9	16	216	21.3	4.7	.8	.4	.7	9.4
Travis Best	PG	23	0	463	57	66	19	4	204	20.1	2.5	2.9	.8	.2	8.9
Sam Perkins	PF	23	0	417	73	10	4	6	110	18.1	3.2	.4	.2	.3	4.8
Derrick McKey	SF	23	0	352	79	14	7	4	47	15.3	3.4	.6	.3	.2	2.0
Reggie Miller	SG	22	22	892	53	60	23	10	527	40.5	2.4	2.7	1.0	.5	24.0
Rik Smits	C	22	21	461	78	21	10	20	241	21.0	3.5	1.0	.5	.9	11.0
Žan Tabak	C	10	0	47	16	0	0	2	12	4.7	1.6	.0	.0	.2	1.2
Chris Mullin	SG	9	1	90	14	5	6	1	31	10.0	1.6	.6	.7	.1	3.4
Jonathan Bender	SF	9	0	21	3	0	1	0	12	2.3	.3	.0	.1	.0	1.3

== NBA Finals ==
- Lakers' backup center John Salley became the first player in NBA history to play on three different championship-winning franchises, as he won titles in 1989 and '90 with the Detroit Pistons and 1996 with the Chicago Bulls.
- This was the Lakers first NBA Finals in the new Staples Center.
- After closing out game 6, fans rioted outside Staples Center by making bonfires, tipping cars, breaking windows of cars and buildings, and vandalizing businesses around the area. Overall, they caused $1 million in damages. In Lakers' championship run the following year, the LAPD came out in bigger force after the Lakers won and prevented the same thing from happening again.
- Staples Center, which was a first-year building in 2000, had a very tricky shooting background and opposing teams often had difficulty shooting there. Pacers coach Larry Bird wanted to have a shoot-around in the arena the day before Game 6 to help his team shoot more consistently because they shot very poorly in Games 1 and 2. However, the Pacers couldn't practice in the building because of an Arena Football game. Bird was very upset about this, and his team had to go down to the Lakers practice facility in El Segundo.
- The two arenas in this series, Conseco Fieldhouse and Staples Center, were both first-year arenas.

=== Summary ===
The following scoring summary is written in a line score format, except that the quarter numbers are replaced by game numbers.

Team	Game 1	Game 2	Game 3	Game 4*	Game 5	Game 6	Wins
Los Angeles (West)	104	111	91	120	87	116	4
Indiana (East)	87	104	100	118	120	111	2

=== Aspects ===
Although the Lakers were one of the more talented teams in the NBA the previous year, they failed to win a single game against the San Antonio Spurs in the 1999 NBA Playoffs. Twenty-four days after being swept by the eventual league champion, the Lakers signed Phil Jackson as head coach. Jackson, famous for coaching Michael Jordan and the six-time champion Chicago Bulls, would build his triangle offense around Shaquille O'Neal and Kobe Bryant. general manager Jerry West surrounded O'Neal and Bryant with effective role players such as Glen Rice, Ron Harper (who had experience with Jackson's triangle offense as part of the '96–'98 Bulls), and A.C. Green (member of the last two Lakers championship teams).

Along with these starters, the Lakers also possessed a strong bench. Robert Horry not only had championship experience with the Houston Rockets but also was a threat on the perimeter and a defensive star. Derek Fisher was a defensively minded point-guard with the ability to shoot well from long range. Rick Fox, acquired after being released by the Boston Celtics, was the Lakers' sixth man. With a healthy O'Neal, the Lakers dominated the regular season, with winning streaks of 11, 16, and 19 en route to a 67–15 record, tying the 1992 Chicago Bulls and 1986 Boston Celtics as the fifth best record in NBA regular season history.

Although many expected the Lakers to reach the Finals, the road would be a rocky one. In the first round, the Lakers won the first two games against the Sacramento Kings, only to drop the next two games in Sacramento. The Lakers then defeated Sacramento in Game 5, 113–86, to face the Phoenix Suns in the conference semi-finals. The Lakers clobbered the Suns, winning the series 4–1 (with their only loss coming in Game 4). In Game 1 of the Western Conference finals against the Portland Trail Blazers, Rasheed Wallace earned two technical fouls and was ejected; the Lakers took advantage of Wallace's absence and secured victory. The Trail Blazers stormed back in the next game, giving the Lakers their worst home loss of the season in a 106–77 shellacking. This setback did not affect Los Angeles, as they assembled a 3–1 series lead by winning the next two games in Portland. The Lakers underestimated the Trail Blazers, however. Led by former Jackson linchpin Scottie Pippen, Portland won back-to-back elimination games and forced a series-deciding Game 7. Amid several controversial foul calls by referee Dick Bavetta against members of the Trail Blazers, Portland relinquished a 75–60 fourth quarter lead. Rallying back with a 25–4 run, the Lakers won the game and secured a berth in the NBA Finals.

In the 1997–1998 NBA season, the Chicago Bulls narrowly defeated the Pacers, 4 games to 3, in the Eastern Conference finals. The 1998–1999 NBA season began with a lockout but saw Indiana return to the Eastern Conference finals, where they fell to the New York Knicks. The 1999–2000 NBA season brought several major changes to the Pacers. It was their first season at Conseco Fieldhouse, as well as their first since 1993 without center Antonio Davis, who was traded for the rights to the No. 5 overall pick in the 1999 NBA Draft. Jalen Rose replaced Chris Mullin in the starting line up, winning the NBA Most Improved Player award, while Austin Croshere replaced him as the sixth man.

The Pacers started the season 7–7 but eventually finished with an Eastern Conference best 56–26 record, including a franchise-best 25 game win streak at home. The Pacers, like the Lakers, struggled in the playoffs. They needed a clutch Travis Best three-pointer to dispatch the Milwaukee Bucks in five games. Indiana faced the Philadelphia 76ers in the second round and took the series in six games, earning a trip to the Eastern Conference finals. The Pacers would face their rival Knicks, winning a memorable six-game series in a reversal of fortunes from years past. With the victory, Indiana advanced to the first NBA Finals in franchise history, becoming the second former ABA team to do so.

=== Game 1 ===
Wednesday, June 7, 2000, 9:00 at the Staples Center.

The Lakers dominated from the start. The Lakers shot 15-for-20 (75%) in the first period while the Pacers shot only 7-for-20 (35%). Miller would miss all of his shots in the first quarter to give the Lakers a 15-point lead. Croshere came off the bench to keep the Pacers alive in the 2nd quarter, scoring 9 points and grabbing 4 rebounds in the quarter. Although the Pacers attempted a comeback in the 2nd quarter, they were still down by 12. In the 3rd quarter, it would be Jackson who led the Pacers to a comeback, cutting the Lakers lead by 2. Miller also hit his first field goal in the 3rd quarter, though it would be his last. The Lakers handled the Pacers in the final quarter, with a 13–2 run winning by 17 points. O'Neal scored 43 points and grabbed 19 rebounds.

Team	1st Qt.	2nd Qt.	3rd Qt.	4th Qt.	Total
Indiana	18	25	28	16	87
Los Angeles	33	22	22	27	104

=== Game 2 ===
Friday, June 9, 2000, 9:00 at the Staples Center.

Los Angeles and Indiana were evenly matched for the first quarter, both scoring 28. However, Los Angeles suffered a major setback when Kobe Bryant left the game in the 2nd quarter due to a sprained ankle and did not return. Jalen Rose later admitted that he intentionally stuck out his foot when Kobe shot a jumpshot in order to trip him when he landed. Ron Harper went in for Bryant and scored 21 points for the game. Desperate to try to gain the lead, Larry Bird resorted to the "Hack-a-Shaq" strategy. Shaq shot 39 free throws, making only 18, an NBA record for most free throws attempted. Despite this low percentage, Shaq made 9 of 16 in the 4th quarter to keep a Lakers lead. The Pacers cut the lead to 99–96 and were looking to foul Shaq, but when Shaq got the ball he passed to Robert Horry who converted not only the layup, but the foul shot as well giving them a 102–96 lead en route to a 111–104 Lakers victory.

Team	1st Qt.	2nd Qt.	3rd Qt.	4th Qt.	Total
Indiana	28	21	20	35	104
Los Angeles	28	24	21	38	111

=== Game 3 ===
Sunday, June 11, 2000, 7:30 at the Conseco Fieldhouse.

Taking advantage of Kobe Bryant's ankle injury, Indiana restored a semblance of parity to the proceedings. Kobe's absence was felt as the Pacers had an 11–2 run in the first quarter to take an 8-point lead. Austin Croshere once again had another huge 2nd quarter, scoring 8 points as the Pacers shot 61% from the field. The Lakers tried to make a run to get back into the game, but upon doings so, Indiana answered with 12 straight points and led by 17. The Lakers were desperate and attempted another run to get within 3 points, but Reggie Miller nailed all his free throws at the end of the game to give Indiana a 9-point win.

Team	1st Qt.	2nd Qt.	3rd Qt.	4th Qt.	Total
Los Angeles	15	27	22	25	91
Indiana	23	30	26	21	100

=== Game 4 ===
Wednesday, June 14, 2000, 9:00 at the Conseco Fieldhouse.

The Pacers took a quick 9–2 lead due to Rik Smits hitting his first four shots. Kobe Bryant attempted to play with his sore ankle but only managed to score 6 points in the first half. Even though Bryant and O'Neal were in foul trouble in the first half (each picking up his third with 5 minutes remaining in the second quarter), Indiana could not take advantage and did not extend their lead. This would be a problem as Kobe Bryant scored 10 points and the Lakers took a 62–60 lead due to a Glen Rice three-pointer. The game remained close going into the fourth quarter, when O'Neal and Reggie Miller scored 14 and 13 points respectively, sending the game into overtime. Midway through overtime, O'Neal committed his sixth foul but 21-year-old Bryant delivered three clutch shots, as the Lakers were able to overcome back-up center John Salley's inability to effectively defend Smits. Smits and Miller scored all 14 of Indiana's OT points, but it was not enough to overcome as Miller missed a last-second three-pointer, and L.A. was able to pull one out in Indianapolis.

Team	1st Qt.	2nd Qt.	3rd Qt.	4th Qt.	OT	Total
Los Angeles	23	28	29	24	16	120
Indiana	33	21	23	27	14	118

=== Game 5 ===
Friday, June 16, 2000, 9:00 at the Conseco Fieldhouse.

Reggie Miller and the Pacers dominated the game from the start in what would be Larry Bird's last game as a coach in the state of Indiana. Reggie Miller came out and made 5 straight shots including a 4-point play. The Pacers hit their first 6 three-point shots in the game. The Pacers would have a 20-point lead in the 2nd quarter, and eventually won by 33 – it was the worst Lakers NBA Finals loss since the 148–114 loss to Boston in the 1985 NBA Finals, known as the "Memorial Day Massacre."

With their loss in Game 5, the Lakers record in close-out games dropped to 3–6 in the 2000 NBA Playoffs (the other losses coming in Games 3 and 4 in the first round against Sacramento, Game 4 in the series against Phoenix, and Games 5 and 6 versus Portland). As a result, the series returned to California.

Team	1st Qt.	2nd Qt.	3rd Qt.	4th Qt.	Total
Los Angeles	28	17	22	20	87
Indiana	39	25	22	34	120

=== Game 6 ===
Monday, June 19, 2000, 9:00 at the Staples Center.

After the two teams traded blows in the first quarter, Mark Jackson concluded the period with a turn-around half-court shot at the buzzer to give the Pacers a 26–24 advantage. They would not relinquish their lead until the fourth quarter. In the first half, the Pacers would lead by as many as twelve points. However, the Lakers chipped away and entered intermission trailing 56–53. Indiana, however, added two more points to their lead, and entered the final period in a position to force a decisive seventh game.

In the fourth quarter, the momentum shifted. The Lakers got four timely three-pointers from Derek Fisher, Robert Horry, and Rick Fox. The turning point occurred on a play where Brian Shaw stole the ball from Jalen Rose, leading to a fast break where Shaquille O'Neal hit an off-balance shot to give the Lakers the lead. The Pacers never led after that point.

The Lakers would build a seven-point lead, but the Pacers fought back to tie the score at 103. After a timeout, the Lakers scored six unanswered points to regain control. The Pacers made one final valiant effort, but it fell short and the Lakers clinched their first championship in twelve years. Shaquille O'Neal led all scorers with 41 points and also pulled down 12 rebounds. He was awarded the Finals MVP.

Team	1st Qt.	2nd Qt.	3rd Qt.	4th Qt.	Total
Indiana	26	30	28	27	111
Los Angeles	24	29	26	37	116

== Awards, records, and honors ==
- Jalen Rose, NBA Most Improved Player Award
- Reggie Miller, NBA All-Star Game
- Dale Davis, NBA All-Star Game
