= Austin Croshere =

American basketball player (born 1975)

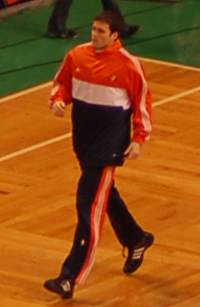
- Croshere with the Golden State Warriors in 2007

Personal information
- Born: May 1, 1975 (age 51) Los Angeles, California, U.S.
- Listed height: 6 ft 10 in (2.08 m)
- Listed weight: 240 lb (109 kg)

Career information
- High school: Crossroads School (Santa Monica, California)
- College: Providence (1993–1997)
- NBA draft: 1997: 1st round, 12th overall pick
- Drafted by: Indiana Pacers
- Playing career: 1997–2009
- Position: Power forward
- Number: 44, 22

Career history
- 1997–2006: Indiana Pacers
- 2006–2007: Dallas Mavericks
- 2007–2008: Golden State Warriors
- 2008–2009: Milwaukee Bucks
- 2009: San Antonio Spurs

Career highlights
- First-team All-Big East (1997)

Career NBA statistics
- Points: 4,475 (6.8 ppg)
- Rebounds: 2,649 (4.0 rpg)
- Assists: 627 (1.0 apg)
- Stats at NBA.com
- Stats at Basketball Reference
Medals
Men's basketball
Representing United States
Summer Universiade
Gold medal – first place	1995 Fukuoka	Team competition

Austin Nathan Croshere (born May 1, 1975) is a color commentator and studio analyst for NCAA and NBA basketball games. During his 12-year career in the National Basketball Association (NBA), Croshere played for the Indiana Pacers, Dallas Mavericks, Golden State Warriors, Milwaukee Bucks and San Antonio Spurs.

== Education ==
Croshere went to Crossroads School in Santa Monica, California, and then played college basketball for Providence College in Providence, Rhode Island.

== Professional career ==
=== Indiana Pacers ===
Croshere was the 12th pick of the 1997 NBA draft, selected by the Indiana Pacers.

A 6 ft 10 in (2.08 m), hard-nosed player who played the power forward and small forward positions, Croshere shot 33.9% from three-point range over the course of his ten-year career.

In the 1999–2000 NBA season, he peaked at just the right time as he helped the Pacers advance to the 2000 NBA Finals against the Los Angeles Lakers, marking the Pacers' first Finals appearance since the ABA-NBA merger. In the 2000 Finals, Croshere was 3rd on the team in scoring, averaging 15.2 points per game on 54.5% shooting.

He was rewarded for his performance in the regular season and particularly the playoffs with a hefty seven year, $51 million contract.

On March 30, 2001, he notched a then career-high 32 points and 10 rebounds against the Boston Celtics as well as hitting the game sealing 3-pointer.

Croshere played 49 games in 2002–03, averaging a career-low 12.9 minutes per game that season as he fell out of the rotation.

Croshere became an important backup during the Rick Carlisle years, and was a key contributor against the Detroit Pistons in the 2004 Eastern Conference Finals. In game 4 of the series, Croshere was in the starting lineup for the first time in over two years; after accumulating only 8 points combined over the first three games, he scored 14 in this game during 30 minutes of play, including 3 out of 4 shooting on three-point field goals en route to an 83-68 road victory for the Pacers to tie the best-of-seven series at two games apiece.

In the 2004–05 season after the Malice at the Palace brawl, Croshere helped lead a depleted Pacers roster. He notched a season high against the Minnesota Timberwolves with 25 points and 11 rebounds (including six consecutive made free throws in the final 36 seconds of the game) on November 25, 2004. He followed this performance with 23 points and 12 rebounds the next night on November 26.

On September 26, 2008, Larry Bird announced that Croshere was invited to training camp with the Pacers for an opportunity at a second stint. He was waived on October 23, 2008.

=== Dallas Mavericks ===
On July 5, 2006, Croshere was traded to the Dallas Mavericks for Marquis Daniels. This move left Jeff Foster as the last Pacer remaining from the 1999–2000 Eastern Conference championship team.

Croshere scored a career-high 34 points in a Mavericks 122–102 win against the Seattle SuperSonics on January 30, 2007.

=== Golden State Warriors ===
On August 3, 2007, Croshere signed with the Golden State Warriors. The 2007–08 season was the first in Croshere's career where he did not make the playoffs.

=== Milwaukee Bucks ===
Croshere spent the 2008–09 pre-season with his former team, the Indiana Pacers. However, he was waived by the Pacers. On October 27, he was signed off waivers by the Milwaukee Bucks. He was released on January 6, 2009, after averaging 3.3 points and 2.2 rebounds per game.

=== San Antonio Spurs ===
On January 16, 2009, Croshere signed a 10-day contract with the San Antonio Spurs. On January 28, his contract expired and he was released by the Spurs after appearing in three games.

== Post-NBA career ==
In February 2010, Croshere joined Fox Sports Indiana as a pre- and post-game analyst for Pacers games. He has also served as a color commentator. In 2013, Croshere was hired as a college basketball studio analyst for Fox Sports. As of 2023, he is a basketball commentator for KABC-TV's Sports Zone post-game shows and college basketball analyst for Westwood One Radio.

== NBA career statistics ==
Legend
GP	Games played	GS	Games started	MPG	Minutes per game
FG%	Field goal percentage	3P%	3-point field goal percentage	FT%	Free throw percentage
RPG	Rebounds per game	APG	Assists per game	SPG	Steals per game
BPG	Blocks per game	PPG	Points per game	**Bold**	Career high

=== Regular season ===
Year	Team	GP	GS	MPG	FG%	3P%	FT%	RPG	APG	SPG	BPG	PPG
1997–98	Indiana	26	0	9.3	.372	.308	.571	1.7	.3	.3	.2	2.9
1998–99	Indiana	27	0	9.2	.427	.276	.870	1.7	.4	.3	.3	3.4
1999–00	Indiana	**81**	14	23.3	.441	.362	.848	**6.4**	1.1	.5	**.7**	**10.3**
2000–01	Indiana	**81**	23	23.1	.394	.338	.866	4.8	1.1	.4	.6	10.1
2001–02	Indiana	76	1	16.9	.413	.338	.851	3.9	1.0	.3	.4	6.8
2002–03	Indiana	49	0	12.9	.411	.391	.815	3.2	1.1	.1	.3	5.1
2003–04	Indiana	77	0	13.6	.388	.389	.894	3.2	.7	.3	.2	5.0
2004–05	Indiana	73	22	**25.0**	.378	.259	.883	5.1	**1.3**	**.7**	.2	8.9
2005–06	Indiana	50	**26**	23.0	**.463**	.386	.882	5.3	1.2	.4	.1	8.2
2006–07	Dallas	61	2	11.9	.351	.286	.865	3.0	.7	.2	.1	3.7
2007–08	Golden State	44	0	10.4	.445	.361	**.906**	2.4	.7	.2	.1	3.9
2008–09	Milwaukee	11	0	7.0	.400	**.455**	.636	2.2	.5	.1	.1	3.3
2008–09	San Antonio	3	0	7.7	.222	.000	.000	3.3	1.0	.0	.0	1.3
Career		659	88	17.4	.407	.340	.861	4.0	1.0	.4	.3	6.8

=== Playoffs ===
Year	Team	GP	GS	MPG	FG%	3P%	FT%	RPG	APG	SPG	BPG	PPG
1999	Indiana	1	0	1.0	.000	.000	**1.000**	1.0	.0	.0	.0	2.0
2000	Indiana	**23**	**2**	21.3	**.418**	.405	.839	4.7	.8	.4	**.7**	9.4
2001	Indiana	4	0	**32.3**	.400	.200	.867	**5.0**	**1.5**	**1.0**	.5	**10.8**
2002	Indiana	4	0	14.8	.400	.333	.750	3.5	.5	.3	.3	6.0
2003	Indiana	4	0	11.5	.263	.000	.857	4.3	.8	.0	.3	4.0
2004	Indiana	13	**2**	16.5	.345	.333	.810	3.1	.9	.3	.2	4.8
2005	Indiana	10	0	8.8	.400	.500	.833	1.7	.0	.4	.1	2.5
2006	Indiana	6	**2**	29.2	.316	.391	.889	3.7	1.2	.8	.0	8.2
2007	Dallas	3	0	11.3	.333	**.750**	**1.000**	2.0	.0	.0	.0	5.0
Career		68	6	18.2	.379	.360	.844	3.6	.7	.4	.4	6.7
