= Latrell Sprewell =

American basketball player (born 1970)

Personal information
- Born: September 8, 1970 (age 56) Milwaukee, Wisconsin, U.S.
- Listed height: 6 ft 5 in (1.96 m)
- Listed weight: 195 lb (88 kg)

Career information
- High school: Washington (Milwaukee, Wisconsin)
- College: Three Rivers (1988–1990); Alabama (1990–1992)
- NBA draft: 1992: 1st round, 24th overall pick
- Drafted by: Golden State Warriors
- Playing career: 1992–2005
- Position: Shooting guard / small forward
- Number: 15, 8

Career history
- 1992–1998: Golden State Warriors
- 1999–2003: New York Knicks
- 2003–2005: Minnesota Timberwolves

Career highlights
- 4× NBA All-Star (1994, 1995, 1997, 2001); All-NBA First Team (1994); NBA All-Defensive Second Team (1994); NBA All-Rookie Second Team (1993); Second-team All-SEC (1992); SEC All-Defensive Team (1992)

Career NBA statistics
- Points: 16,712 (18.3 ppg)
- Assists: 3,664 (4.0 apg)
- Steals: 1,294 (1.4 spg)
- Stats at NBA.com
- Stats at Basketball Reference

Latrell Fontaine Sprewell (born September 8, 1970) is an American former professional basketball player who played for the Golden State Warriors, the New York Knicks, and the Minnesota Timberwolves during his 13-year National Basketball Association (NBA) career. During his career, Sprewell received four NBA All-Star selections, an All-NBA First Team selection, and an NBA All-Defensive Second Team selection. He helped the Knicks reach the 1999 NBA Finals and the Timberwolves to the 2004 Western Conference finals. Sprewell's career was overshadowed by a 1997 incident in which he choked and punched then-Warriors coach P. J. Carlesimo during practice, which resulted in a 68-game suspension.

== Early life ==
Sprewell attended Washington High School in Milwaukee, Wisconsin.

== College career ==
Sprewell played competitively with the Three Rivers Community College Raiders Basketball Team in Poplar Bluff, Missouri, from 1988 to 1990, and from 1990 to 1992 for the Alabama Crimson Tide, where he was a teammate of future NBA players Robert Horry, Jason Caffey, James Robinson, and Marcus Webb.

== Professional career ==
=== Golden State Warriors (1992–1998) ===
Sprewell was selected 24th overall in the 1992 NBA draft by the Golden State Warriors. Sprewell, nicknamed "Spree", made an immediate impact, starting 69 of the 77 games he played in during his rookie season and averaging 15.4 points per game. He was a member of the NBA All-Rookie Second Team in 1993 and both the All-NBA First Team and the NBA All-Defensive Second Team in 1994. His performance steadily improved, leading the team in scoring and representing the Western Conference in the 1994, 1995, and 1997 NBA All-Star Games. In 1993–94 he led the league in games played and minutes per game as the Warriors, led by Sprewell and NBA Rookie of the Year power forward Chris Webber, made it back to the playoffs. They lost in the first round to the Phoenix Suns in three games.

==== 1997 choking incident ====
On December 1, 1997, Sprewell attacked head coach P. J. Carlesimo during a Warriors practice in Oakland. When Carlesimo yelled at him to make crisper passes (specifically asking him to "put a little mustard" on a pass), Sprewell responded that he was not in the mood for criticism and told the coach to keep his distance. When Carlesimo approached, Sprewell threatened to kill him and dragged him backward by his throat, choking him for 7 to 10 seconds before his teammates and assistant coaches pulled him off Carlesimo. Sprewell returned about 20 minutes later after showering and changing and again accosted Carlesimo. He landed a glancing blow at Carlesimo's right cheek before being dragged away again by the assistant coaches. This was not Sprewell's first violent incident with the Warriors; in 1995, he fought with teammate Jerome Kersey, returned to practice carrying a two-by-four, and reportedly threatened to return with a gun. In a 1993 practice, Sprewell fought with Byron Houston, who was 50 pounds (23 kg) heavier than Sprewell and had what many teammates described as a Mike Tyson-like demeanor and physique.

Sprewell was initially suspended for 10 games without pay. The next day, in the wake of a public uproar, the Warriors voided the remainder of his contract, which included $23.7 million over three years, and the NBA suspended him for a year. Sprewell took the case to arbitration and the contract voiding was overturned, but the league suspended him for the rest of the season without pay, which amounted to 68 games. He sought to vacate the arbitration contract under the terms of the collective bargaining agreement. His case went through all appeals, and was remanded. During the time he was serving his suspension, Sprewell was charged with reckless driving for his role in a 90-mile-per-hour (145 km/h) automobile accident that injured two people. He spent three months under house arrest as part of a no-contest plea.

Sprewell's 68-game suspension was the second longest suspension ever issued by the NBA, only eclipsed by Ron Artest in 2004.

=== New York Knicks (1999–2003) ===
Due to the NBA lockout, Sprewell did not play again until February 1999, after the Warriors traded him to the New York Knicks for John Starks, Chris Mills, and Terry Cummings. Sprewell played 37 games for the Knicks that season, playing off the bench in all but four games.

Many pundits felt that trading for the allegedly volatile Sprewell was too big a gamble for the Knicks, but Sprewell vowed he was a changed man. The Knicks, who at the time still revolved around veteran All-Star center Patrick Ewing, narrowly qualified for the 1999 playoffs, making the field as the eighth seed in the Eastern Conference. They defeated the Miami Heat, Atlanta Hawks and Indiana Pacers, becoming the first eighth seed in NBA history to reach the Finals, where the by-now injury-riddled team were defeated by the San Antonio Spurs in five games. Sprewell enjoyed a good series for the most part, averaging 26.0 ppg. He tallied 35 points and grabbed 10 rebounds in the Knicks' 78-77 Game 5 loss, and was featured on the cover of the September 1999 issue of SLAM Magazine.

Sprewell moved into the Knicks' starting lineup for the 1999–2000 season at small forward, and averaged 18.6 points, helping the Knicks to a 50–32 record, good enough for the third seed in the Eastern Conference, led by Sprewell, Ewing and shooting guard Allan Houston. The Knicks advanced past the Toronto Raptors in three games and the Miami Heat in seven in the first two rounds of the playoffs, en route to the Eastern Conference Finals against the Indiana Pacers. But their quest for back-to-back NBA Finals appearances came to an end when they lost to the Pacers in 6 games in the Eastern Conference Finals. Sprewell averaged 19.7 ppg in the series, and the Knicks gave him a five-year, $62 million contract extension.

The 2000–01 season saw Sprewell step up as the Knicks' leader with Ewing traded to the Seattle SuperSonics, making his only All-Star appearance for the Knicks that year, scoring 17.7 points. But despite another impressive season from Sprewell, the Knicks lost in the first round to the Toronto Raptors in five games in the playoffs. In 2001–02 Sprewell averaged 19.4 ppg, including 49 points in a game against the Boston Celtics, one of three times he scored 40 or more points that season; but the Knicks missed the playoffs for the first time in 15 years.

Before the 2002–03 season, Sprewell reported to training camp with a broken hand, which he claimed occurred when he slipped on his yacht; the Knicks fined him a record $250,000 for failing to report the incident. He then sued the New York Post for claiming he had broken his hand in a fight. Sprewell lost the lawsuit.

That season, Sprewell made NBA history as he hit 9 of 9 three-point shots in one game, making the most three-pointers without a single miss for the first time en route to a season-high 38 points versus the Los Angeles Clippers. The record has since been tied twice by Ben Gordon once as a Chicago Bull and once as a Detroit Piston. Later Knick Jalen Brunson also tied the record. After that season, in which the Knicks missed the playoffs for the second year in a row, Sprewell was traded to the Minnesota Timberwolves in a four-team trade involving Keith Van Horn, Glenn Robinson, and Terrell Brandon.

=== Minnesota Timberwolves (2003–2005) ===
In the 2003–04 season, Sprewell became part of the league's highest-scoring trio alongside superstar power forward Kevin Garnett and point guard Sam Cassell. With a 58–24 record, the Timberwolves qualified for the 2004 playoffs as the top seed in the Western Conference. They defeated the Denver Nuggets in five games and the Sacramento Kings in seven to advance past the first two rounds of the playoffs. In the Western Conference Finals they met the Los Angeles Lakers, who defeated them in six games, the Timberwolves' only appearance in the conference finals until 2024. Sprewell finished third in team scoring at 16.8 ppg, behind Garnett's 24.2 and Cassell's 19.8.

On October 31, 2004, the Minnesota Timberwolves offered Sprewell a three-year, $21 million contract extension, a substantial pay cut. Claiming to feel insulted by the offer, he publicly expressed outrage, declaring, "I have a family to feed." He declined the extension and the Timberwolves offered him nothing more. Having once more drawn the ire of fans and sports media, Sprewell had the worst season of his career in the final year of his contract. In the summer of 2005, the Denver Nuggets, Cleveland Cavaliers and Houston Rockets all expressed interest in signing Sprewell, but none ended up signing him. His final NBA game was on April 20, 2005 against the eventual champion San Antonio Spurs.

One month into the 2005–06 season and without a contract, Sprewell's agent, Bob Gist, said his client would rather retire than play for the NBA minimum salary, telling Sports Illustrated, "Latrell doesn't need the money that badly. To go from being offered $7 million to taking $1 million, that would be a slap in the face." Several days later, Gist said that Sprewell planned to wait until "teams get desperate" around the trade deadline in February, and then sign with a contending team—an eventuality that never materialized. Gist said that Sprewell would not be interested in signing for any team's $5 million mid-level exception, calling that amount "a level beneath which [Sprewell] would not stoop or kneel."

In March 2006, Sprewell was offered contracts by the Dallas Mavericks and San Antonio Spurs, both of which were considered at the time strong favorites to win the NBA Championship, but Sprewell failed to respond and remained a free agent as the season closed. The Los Angeles Lakers also showed some interest in him at the start of that season, but nothing came of it.

Over the course of his career, Sprewell started 868 of the 913 games he played in, averaging 18.8 ppg, 4.2 apg, and 4.1 rpg with playoff career averages of 19.7 ppg, 3.4 apg, and 4.3 rpg. He was an All-NBA First Team selection at the end of his second season and made the All-NBA Defensive second team that same season.

== NBA career statistics ==
Legend
GP	Games played	GS	Games started	MPG	Minutes per game
FG%	Field goal percentage	3P%	3-point field goal percentage	FT%	Free throw percentage
RPG	Rebounds per game	APG	Assists per game	SPG	Steals per game
BPG	Blocks per game	PPG	Points per game	**Bold**	Career high

*	Led the league

=== Regular season ===
Year	Team	GP	GS	MPG	FG%	3P%	FT%	RPG	APG	SPG	BPG	PPG
1992–93	Golden State	77	69	35.6	**.464**	.369	.746	3.5	3.8	1.6	.7	15.4
1993–94	Golden State	**82**	**82**	**43.1***	.433	.361	.774	**4.9**	4.7	**2.2**	**.9**	21.0
1994–95	Golden State	69	69	40.2	.418	.276	.781	3.7	4.0	1.6	.7	20.6
1995–96	Golden State	78	78	39.3	.428	.323	.789	**4.9**	4.2	1.6	.6	18.9
1996–97	Golden State	80	79	41.9	.449	.354	.843	4.6	**6.3**	1.7	.6	**24.2**
1997–98	Golden State	14	13	39.1	.397	.188	.745	3.6	4.9	1.4	.4	21.4
1998–99	New York	37	4	33.3	.415	.273	.812	4.2	2.5	1.2	.1	16.4
1999–00	New York	**82**	**82***	40.0	.435	.346	**.866**	4.3	4.0	1.3	.3	18.6
2000–01	New York	77	77	39.2	.430	.304	.783	4.5	3.5	1.4	.4	17.7
2001–02	New York	81	81	41.1	.404	.360	.821	3.7	3.9	1.2	.2	19.4
2002–03	New York	74	73	38.6	.403	**.372**	.794	3.9	4.5	1.4	.3	16.4
2003–04	Minnesota	**82**	**82**	37.8	.409	.331	.814	3.8	3.5	1.1	.3	16.8
2004–05	Minnesota	80	79	30.6	.414	.327	.830	3.2	2.2	.7	.3	12.8
Career		913	868	38.6	.425	.337	.804	4.1	4.0	1.4	.4	18.3
All-Star		4	1	19.3	.486	.125	.529	3.8	2.5	1.3	.0	11.0

=== Playoffs ===
Year	Team	GP	GS	MPG	FG%	3P%	FT%	RPG	APG	SPG	BPG	PPG
1994	Golden State	3	3	40.7	**.433**	.348	.667	3.0	**7.0**	.7	**1.0**	**22.7**
1999	New York	**20**	8	37.2	.419	.160	**.850**	**4.8**	2.2	1.0	.3	20.4
2000	New York	16	16	**43.8**	.414	.333	.784	4.4	3.6	1.1	.3	18.7
2001	New York	5	5	42.4	.407	.214	.760	3.0	3.4	1.0	.2	18.4
2004	Minnesota	18	**18**	42.8	.421	**.385**	.779	4.4	4.0	**1.6**	.7	19.8
Career		62	50	41.1	.418	.330	.803	4.3	3.4	1.2	.4	19.7

== Personal life ==
As of 2022, Sprewell's Instagram profile stated he was working in community relations with the Knicks and as a media personality for the Madison Square Garden.

=== Legal issues ===
On August 30, 2006, Milwaukee police investigated a claim by a 21-year-old female that she and Sprewell were having consensual sex aboard his yacht when Sprewell began to strangle her. Police allegedly observed red marks on her neck. Police investigating the allegation searched Sprewell's yacht for evidence. On September 6, police declined to press charges. Sprewell then sought a restraining order along with "civil remedies" against the accuser.

On January 31, 2007, Sprewell's long-term companion sued him for $200 million for ending their relationship agreement. She claimed Sprewell agreed to support her and their four children through college.

On August 22, 2007, Sprewell's $1.5 million 70 ft (21 m) yacht was repossessed by a federal marshal. He had failed to continue paying for and insuring the vessel, for which he reportedly still owed approximately $1.3 million. In February 2008, the yacht was auctioned for $856,000 after Sprewell defaulted on the mortgage. Three months later, a Milwaukee-area home Sprewell owned went into foreclosure status. In July 2009, a Westchester County, New York mansion Sprewell owned went into foreclosure status, but that action was dismissed on motion of another party's attorney.

In 2011, Sprewell owed the state of Wisconsin $3.5 million in unpaid income taxes. On January 1, 2013, he was arrested for disorderly conduct after police received numerous complaints about loud music.

== See also ==
- List of NBA annual minutes leaders
- List of people banned or suspended by the NBA
