= Contract year phenomenon =

Term used in North American sports to describe the occurrence when athletes perf

Contract year phenomenon is a term used in North American sports to describe the occurrence when athletes perform at a very high level in the season prior to their free agency eligibility.

In the NBA, a study showed that Player efficiency rating (PER) on average went up during the player's contract year, but then dipped below baseline the year after signing said deal. Also, while blocks and steals did not increase during the contract year, they still significantly dipped below the baseline the year after. In the MLB, when averaged across the population there was no significant improvement in statistics during players' contract year, but various metrics for batting were shown to drop off the year following the new contract. This is in line with recent psychological theory that suggests salient external motivators (like a large monetary contract) may work to undermine intrinsic motivation (and thus performance).

The contract year phenomenon is most associated with the NBA due to the league's high salaries and lengthy guaranteed contracts. This phenomenon is also associated with MLB, for similar reasons. It is often less associated with the NFL due to the league's comparatively lower guaranteed salaries. In general, many NFL players who sign contracts with new teams and then don't perform can simply be released from their team, as the team is then only held responsible for any bonuses already paid in the contract.

Recent MLB studies do find evidence of the contract year boosting a free agent hitter's On-Base-Plus-Slugging Percentage (OPS) by 4-6%. By using fixed effects regression analysis and taking into account the likelihood that a player would not retire at the end of his contract, this statistically significant boost occurs. Players inclined to retire generally show a lower OPS during their contract year since the financial incentive to boost performance is absent, whereas healthy, relatively young players seek a lucrative free agent contract and generally boost their production to garner the contract. Fixed effects regression modeling captures the changes in a player's performance relative to his past performance, thus capturing the changes in his behavior. Ordinary least squares regression focuses on differences across players, fails to look at a player's performance over his contract cycle, and often concludes there is not contract year boost. This happens because high OPS performances associated with better players are mixed with lower OPS performances of lesser quality players, causing the average effect of the contract year to appear to be zero.
