= Dale Davis (basketball) =

American basketball player (born 1969)

Personal information
- Born: March 25, 1969 (age 57) Toccoa, Georgia, U.S.
- Listed height: 6 ft 11 in (2.11 m)
- Listed weight: 252 lb (114 kg)

Career information
- High school: Stephens County (Toccoa, Georgia)
- College: Clemson (1987–1991)
- NBA draft: 1991: 1st round, 13th overall pick
- Drafted by: Indiana Pacers
- Playing career: 1991–2007
- Position: Center / power forward
- Number: 32, 34

Career history
- 1991–2000: Indiana Pacers
- 2000–2004: Portland Trail Blazers
- 2004–2005: Golden State Warriors
- 2005: Indiana Pacers
- 2005–2007: Detroit Pistons

Career highlights
- NBA All-Star (2000); First-team All-ACC (1990); Second-team All-ACC (1991); No. 34 retired by Clemson Tigers

Career NBA statistics
- Points: 8,706 (8.0 ppg)
- Rebounds: 8,605 (7.9 rpg)
- Blocks: 1,270 (1.2 bpg)
- Stats at NBA.com
- Stats at Basketball Reference
Medals
Men's basketball
Representing United States
Summer Universiade
Gold medal – first place	1989 Duisburg	National team

Elliott Lydell "Dale" Davis (born March 25, 1969) is an American former professional basketball player who played center and power forward.

== Career ==
Davis was drafted by the Indiana Pacers with the 13th pick of the 1991 NBA draft and spent the first nine years of his career with them. He quickly established himself as the team's starting power forward and was the workhorse of the Pacers' outstanding teams in the mid-1990s. He routinely averaged double-digits in points and near double-digits in rebounds throughout his Pacers career and left the franchise as the team's all-time rebounds leader in their NBA era. (The Pacers were an original member of the American Basketball Association for several years before joining the NBA.)

Following the 1999–2000 season, in which Davis was named to the All-Star team and the Pacers made it to the NBA Finals, the organization decided it was time to rebuild with a younger group of players. They traded Davis to the Portland Trail Blazers in exchange for Jermaine O'Neal and Joe Kleine, and O'Neal soon went on to become the Pacers' franchise player.

Davis spent four years with the Blazers, putting up much the same numbers as he did with the Pacers—roughly 8 points and 8 rebounds per game. He played 313 games for the Blazers, starting 235 times.

On July 20, 2004, the Blazers traded Davis and Dan Dickau to the Golden State Warriors in exchange for Nick Van Exel.

On February 24, 2005, Davis was traded again, along with guard Speedy Claxton, to the New Orleans Hornets for guard Baron Davis. Davis was released soon afterward and signed with his first team, the Pacers, on March 4, 2005. He immediately started in place of the injured Jermaine O'Neal, earning one point, seven rebounds and two blocked shots in a Pacers' road victory against the Blazers.

In all, Davis started all 25 games he played for the Pacers in the 2004–05 regular season, contributing 6.9 points, 8.9 rebounds and 1.32 blocks per game.

In June 2006, he became a co-owner in the NASCAR NEXTEL Cup Series when he bought interest in R&J Racing.

On August 26, 2005, Davis signed as a free agent with the Detroit Pistons. He played with the Pistons for 2 years, retiring from basketball after the 2006–2007 NBA season.

== Legal troubles ==
In August 2006, Davis was shocked with a stun gun as Miami Beach police arrested him for assaulting a police officer, disorderly conduct, and resisting arrest. In December 2006, Davis was acquitted of all charges.

== NBA career statistics ==
Legend
GP	Games played	GS	Games started	MPG	Minutes per game
FG%	Field goal percentage	3P%	3-point field goal percentage	FT%	Free throw percentage
RPG	Rebounds per game	APG	Assists per game	SPG	Steals per game
BPG	Blocks per game	PPG	Points per game	**Bold**	Career high
*	Led the league

=== Regular season ===
Year	Team	GP	GS	MPG	FG%	3P%	FT%	RPG	APG	SPG	BPG	PPG
1991–92	Indiana	64	23	20.3	.552	.000	.572	6.4	.5	.4	1.2	6.2
1992–93	Indiana	**82**	**82**	27.6	**.568**	–	**.529**	8.8	.8	.8	**1.8**	8.9
1993–94	Indiana	66	64	**34.7**	.529	.000	.527	**10.9**	**1.5**	.7	1.6	**11.7**
1994–95	Indiana	74	70	31.7	.563	.000	.533	9.4	.8	**1.0**	1.6	10.6
1995–96	Indiana	78	77	33.6	.558	–	.467	9.1	1.0	.7	1.4	10.3
1996–97	Indiana	80	76	32.4	.538	–	.428	9.7	.7	.8	1.0	10.4
1997–98	Indiana	78	78	27.9	.548	–	.465	7.8	.9	.7	1.1	8.0
1998–99	Indiana	50*	50*	27.5	.533	–	.618	8.3	.4	.4	1.1	8.0
1999–00	Indiana	74	72	28.7	.502	–	.685	9.9	.9	.7	1.3	10.0
2000–01	Portland	81	43	26.7	.479	.000	.632	7.5	1.3	.5	.9	7.2
2001–02	Portland	78	77	31.4	.510	–	.708	8.8	1.2	.8	1.1	9.5
2002–03	Portland	78	78	29.3	.541	–	.633	7.2	1.2	.7	.9	7.4
2003–04	Portland	76	37	22.1	.473	–	.613	5.2	.9	.6	.8	4.4
2004–05	Golden State	36	3	16.0	.413	–	.579	4.3	.6	.4	.9	3.1
2004–05	Indiana	25	25	29.2	.536	–	.623	8.9	1.0	.8	1.3	6.9
2005–06	Detroit	28	2	6.4	.375	.000	.533	1.9	.2	.0	.3	.9
2006–07	Detroit	46	6	10.1	.446	–	.654	3.0	.3	.2	.7	1.8
Career		1094	863	27.1	.530	.000	.562	7.9	.9	.6	1.2	8.0
All-Star		1	0	14.0	.667	–	–	8.0	1.0	.0	.0	4.0

=== Playoffs ===
Year	Team	GP	GS	MPG	FG%	3P%	FT%	RPG	APG	SPG	BPG	PPG
1992	Indiana	3	0	23.0	.400	–	–	6.3	.7	.0	**1.7**	2.7
1993	Indiana	4	4	29.3	**.667**	–	.250	8.0	1.0	1.0	1.0	4.3
1994	Indiana	16	16	36.1	.528	.000	.306	9.9	.7	1.1	1.0	7.7
1995	Indiana	17	17	28.8	.533	–	.489	8.0	.4	.4	.8	7.9
1996	Indiana	5	5	**36.8**	.516	–	.364	11.2	.8	.6	1.2	7.2
1998	Indiana	16	16	29.1	.651	–	.453	7.5	.8	.3	1.1	8.8
1999	Indiana	13	13	30.3	.584	–	.560	10.2	.8	.8	1.4	**9.1**
2000	Indiana	**23**	**23**	31.0	.523	–	.542	**11.4**	.7	.5	1.3	8.3
2001	Portland	2	0	10.0	.000	.000	.500	2.0	.0	.5	.0	.5
2002	Portland	3	3	23.3	.273	–	.500	6.7	1.3	**1.3**	1.0	2.3
2003	Portland	6	6	27.0	.583	–	.654	8.0	**1.5**	.8	.3	7.5
2005	Indiana	13	13	23.9	.448	–	**.680**	6.2	.4	.7	.5	5.3
2006	Detroit	8	0	4.5	.000	–	.500	1.1	.1	.0	.0	.3
2007	Detroit	8	0	6.4	.375	–	.500	1.5	.1	.3	.3	1.0
Career		137	116	26.7	.533	.000	.503	8.0	.6	.6	.9	6.6

== Personal life ==
Davis is the biological father of Trayce Jackson-Davis who currently plays for the Toronto Raptors, and played college basketball for the Indiana Hoosiers of the Big Ten Conference.
