= 2000 NBA All-Star Game =

Exhibition basketball game

	1	2	3	4	Total
East	26	33	38	29	126
West	33	31	35	38	137
- Date: February 13, 2000
- Arena: The Arena in Oakland
- City: Oakland
- MVP: Tim Duncan and Shaquille O'Neal
- National anthem: Al Green (USA); The Moffatts (Canada)
- Halftime show: Kenny Wayne Shepherd, Mary J. Blige, LL Cool J, 98 Degrees, Montell Jordan, Martina McBride
- Attendance: 18,325
- Network: NBC; TNT (All-Star Saturday)
- Announcers: Bob Costas, Doug Collins (SD broadcast); Mike Breen, Bill Walton and Steve Jones (HD broadcast)

NBA All-Star Game
< 1998	2001 >

The 2000 NBA All-Star Game was an exhibition basketball game which was played on February 13, 2000, at The Arena in Oakland in Oakland, California, home of the Golden State Warriors. This game was the 49th edition of the North American National Basketball Association (NBA) All-Star Game and was played during the 1999–2000 NBA season. The 1999 game was canceled due to the NBA lockout.

It was the third time the Warriors hosted the All-star game and the first time since 1967, as the San Francisco Warriors hosted the game at the Cow Palace in Daly City. This was the first and only All-Star Game held in Oakland, as the Warriors would relocate to San Francisco in 2019.

The Western Conference won the game with the score of 137–126 while Shaquille O'Neal and Tim Duncan were both named MVP of the game. O'Neal took the All Star MVP trophy saying to Duncan, "you already have one of those rings" (referring to the championship ring Duncan received due to his membership on the 1998–99 San Antonio Spurs team with David Robinson and Gregg Popovich), "so I'm taking the trophy." Allen Iverson was the leading scorer of the game with 26 points.

== Background ==
The Arena in Oakland in Oakland, California, was announced by NBA Commissioner David Stern to host the All-Star Game on June 25, 1998, following its renovation from 1996 to 1997.

== All-Star Game ==
=== Coaches ===
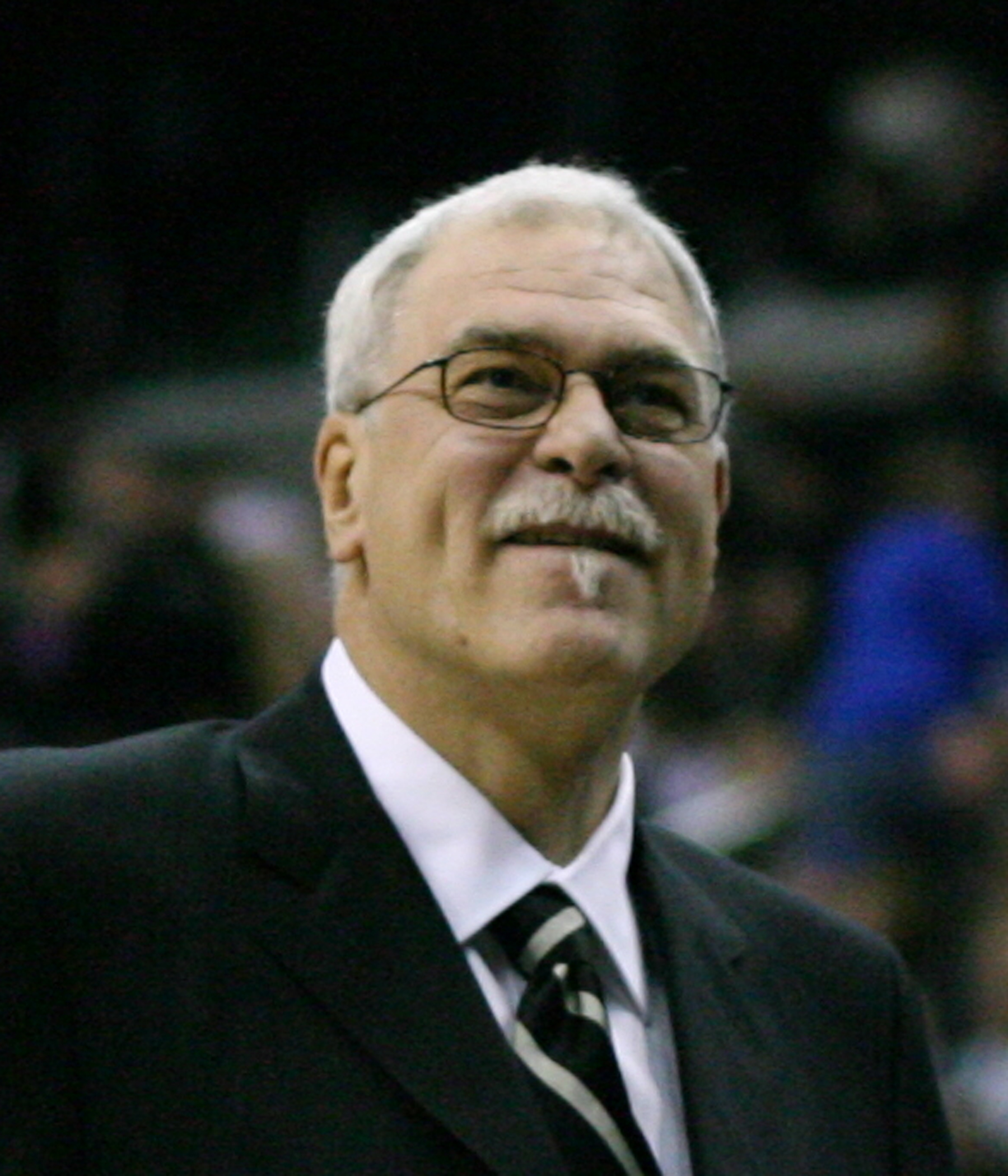
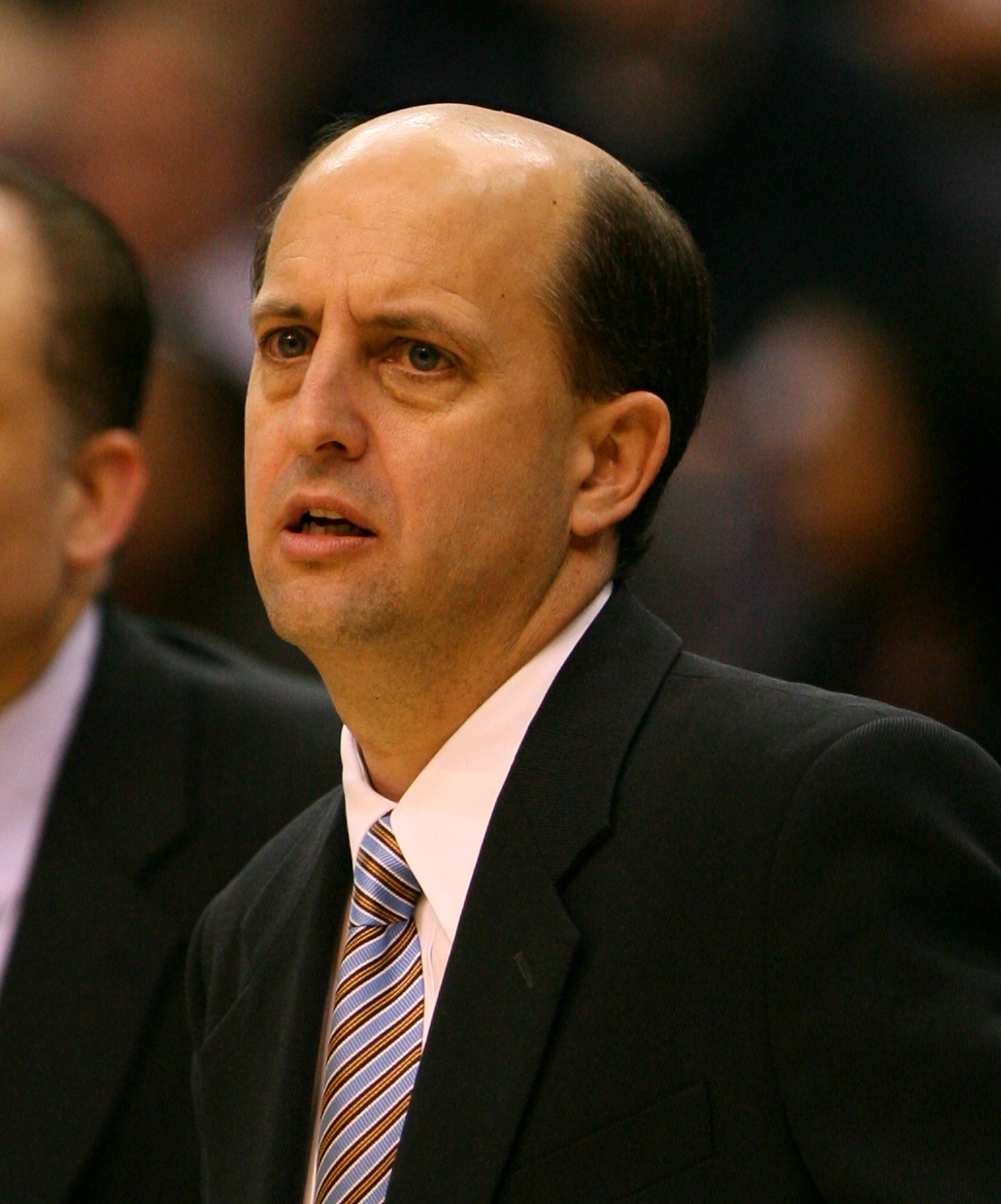
Phil Jackson (left) and Jeff Van Gundy (right) were selected as the West and East head coach, respectively.

The coach whose team has the best record in its conference is granted the right to coach their team. However, despite this rule, no one is allowed to coach in consecutive All-Star Games.

The coach for the West was Phil Jackson, head coach of the Western Conference leader Los Angeles Lakers. The coach for the East was Jeff Van Gundy, head coach of the New York Knicks, coaching in the game for the first time because Larry Bird, head coach of the Eastern Conference leader Indiana Pacers, was ineligible after coaching in the 1998 game, and Pat Riley, head coach of the second-place Miami Heat, had coached as recently as the 1993 game. League rules prohibit a coach from coaching in consecutive All-Star Games, passing the selection to the coach from the next top teams who was the least recent to coach.

=== Players ===
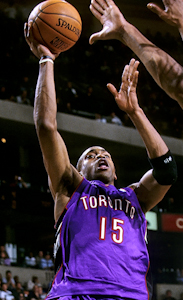
Vince Carter received the most votes from fans.

The rosters for the All-Star Game were chosen in two ways. The starters were chosen via a fan ballot. Two guards, two forwards and one center who received the highest vote were named the All-Star starters. The reserves were chosen by votes among the NBA head coaches in their respective conferences. The coaches were not permitted to vote for their own players. The reserves consist of two guards, two forwards, one center and two players regardless of position. If a player is unable to participate due to injury, the commissioner will select a replacement.

Vince Carter of the Toronto Raptors topped the ballots with 1,911,973 votes, which earned him a starting position as a forward in the Eastern Conference team. Allen Iverson, Eddie Jones, Grant Hill, and Alonzo Mourning completed the Eastern Conference starting position. This was the first All-Star appearance by Carter and Iverson, and Hill's fifth consecutive start as an All-Star. The Eastern Conference reserves included five first-time selections, Allan Houston, Ray Allen, Glenn Robinson, Jerry Stackhouse, and Dale Davis. Reggie Miller, and Dikembe Mutombo rounded out the team with their fifth and sixth respective appearances. Three teams, Indiana Pacers, Detroit Pistons, and Milwaukee Bucks, had two representations at the All-Star Game with Miller/Davis, Hill/Stackhouse, and Allen/Robinson.

The Western Conference's leading vote-getter was Shaquille O'Neal, who earned his seventh consecutive All-Star Game selection with 1,807,609 votes. Jason Kidd, Kobe Bryant, Kevin Garnett, and Tim Duncan completed the Western Conference starting positions. Bryant, Garnett, and O'Neal were starters for the previous year's Western Conference team. Duncan became an All-Star Game starter for the first time after he was selected as a reserve in last year's game. The Western Conference reserves include two first-time selections, Rasheed Wallace and Michael Finley. The team is rounded out by Gary Payton, Chris Webber, John Stockton, Karl Malone, and David Robinson. Three teams, Los Angeles Lakers, Utah Jazz, and San Antonio Spurs, had two representations at the All-Star Game with Bryant/O'Neal, Malone/Stockton, and Duncan/Robinson.

=== Roster ===
Western Conference All-Stars
Pos	Player	Team	No. of selections	Votes
Starters
G	Jason Kidd	Phoenix Suns	3rd	1,061,031
G	Kobe Bryant	Los Angeles Lakers	2nd	1,022,897
F	Kevin Garnett	Minnesota Timberwolves	3rd	1,550,976
F	Tim Duncan	San Antonio Spurs	2nd	1,321,436
C	Shaquille O'Neal	Los Angeles Lakers	7th	1,807,609
Reserves
G	Michael Finley	Dallas Mavericks	1st	197,431
G	Gary Payton	Seattle SuperSonics	6th	898,601
G	John Stockton	Utah Jazz	10th	259,563
F	Karl Malone	Utah Jazz	12th	327,599
F	Rasheed Wallace	Portland Trail Blazers	1st	177,022
F	Chris Webber	Sacramento Kings	2nd	661,865
C	David Robinson	San Antonio Spurs	9th	595,451
Head coach: Phil Jackson (Los Angeles Lakers)

Eastern Conference All-Stars
Pos	Player	Team	No. of selections	Votes
Starters
G	Allen Iverson	Philadelphia 76ers	1st	1,843,011
G	Eddie Jones	Charlotte Hornets	3rd	734,940
F	Vince Carter	Toronto Raptors	1st	1,911,973
F	Grant Hill	Detroit Pistons	5th	1,371,304
C	Alonzo Mourning	Miami Heat	5th	1,878,588
Reserves
G	Ray Allen	Milwaukee Bucks	1st	443,295
G	Allan Houston	New York Knicks	1st	600,876
G	Reggie Miller	Indiana Pacers	5th	366,137
G	Jerry Stackhouse	Detroit Pistons	1st	—
F	Dale Davis	Indiana Pacers	1st	—
F	Glenn Robinson	Milwaukee Bucks	1st	184,230
C	Dikembe Mutombo	Atlanta Hawks	6th	277,768
Head coach: Jeff Van Gundy (New York Knicks)

=== Game ===
February 13, 2000

Western Conference 137, Eastern Conference 126
Scoring by quarter: 33–26, 31–33, 35–38, 38–29
Pts: Kevin Garnett, Tim Duncan 24 each Rebs: Tim Duncan 14; Asts: Jason Kidd 14	Pts: Allen Iverson 26; Rebs: Dikembe Mutombo 8 Asts: Allen Iverson 9

Oakland Arena, Oakland, California
Attendance: 18,325
Referees:
- Joe Crawford
- Terry Durham
- Joe Forte

The Eastern Conference led in the first three minutes of the game but then the Western Conference took advantage and finished the first quarter leading 33–26.

The East tried to come back in the second quarter but the score at halftime the West was still ahead of five points, 64–59. The Eastern Conference tied the game at 91 with two minutes and eight seconds remaining in the third quarter.

Chris Webber made a buzzer-beater at the end of the quarter and the Western Conference took the lead 99–97. The West started the fourth quarter with an 8–0 run that determined the win.

The co-MVPs of the game (Shaquille O'Neal and Tim Duncan) combined for 46 points and 23 rebounds. It was the third time in All-Star Game history that two players won the MVP award. It also happened in 1959 (Bob Pettit and Elgin Baylor) and in 1993 (John Stockton and Karl Malone). O'Neal would later share an All-Star MVP award nine years later, this time with former Laker teammate Kobe Bryant, making him the only player to share All-Star MVP honors with another player twice.

The American anthem was sung by Al Green. The Canadian anthem was sung by The Moffatts.

=== Box score ===
==== Eastern Conference ====
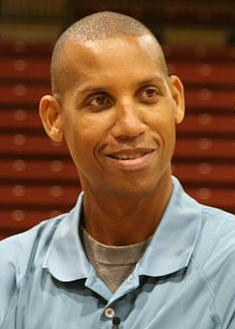
This was the last of five All-Star appearances for Reggie Miller.

Player	Min	Fg	3pt	Ft	Off	Def	Tot	Ast	Pf	St	To	Bs	Pts
Vince Carter*, Tor	28	6-11	0-2	0-0	2	2	4	2	0	2	2	0	12
Grant Hill*, Det	19	3-7	0-1	1-1	0	3	3	5	0	1	3	0	7
Alonzo Mourning*, Mia	27	7-11	0-0	1-2	2	5	7	1	4	3	1	5	15
Eddie Jones*, Cha	21	4-7	2-3	0-0	1	3	4	3	1	1	1	0	10
Allen Iverson*, Phi	28	10-18	2-2	4-5	2	0	2	9	0	2	5	0	26
Allan Houston, NY	18	3-10	1-3	4-4	0	0	0	2	1	1	1	0	11
Glenn Robinson, Mil	17	5-10	0-0	0-0	2	4	6	0	0	0	0	0	10
Ray Allen, Mil	17	4-13	1-6	5-6	1	0	1	2	2	3	3	1	14
Dikembe Mutombo, Atl	16	2-4	0-0	0-0	2	6	8	0	0	0	2	0	4
Dale Davis, Ind	14	2-3	0-0	0-0	3	5	8	1	0	0	0	0	4
Jerry Stackhouse, Det	14	4-7	0-0	0-0	0	1	1	2	2	0	1	0	8
Reggie Miller, Ind	21	1-7	1-6	2-2	0	2	2	3	1	1	1	0	5
TOTAL	240	51-108	7-23	17-20	15	31	46	30	11	14	20	6	126

==== Western Conference ====
Player	Min	Fg	3pt	Ft	Off	Def	Tot	Ast	Pf	St	To	Bs	Pts
Kevin Garnett*, Min	35	10-19	0-1	4-4	3	7	10	5	1	1	0	1	24
Tim Duncan*, San	33	12-14	0-0	0-0	7	7	14	4	3	1	2	1	24
Shaquille O'Neal*, Lal	25	11-20	0-0	0-2	4	5	9	3	2	0	4	3	22
Kobe Bryant*, Lal	28	7-16	1-4	0-0	1	0	1	3	3	2	1	0	15
Jason Kidd*, Pho	34	4-9	3-6	0-0	0	5	5	14	0	4	6	0	11
Gary Payton, Sea	20	1-8	0-4	3-3	0	4	4	8	1	2	2	0	5
Chris Webber, Sac	13	3-10	0-0	0-0	3	5	8	3	2	1	2	0	6
Rasheed Wallace, Por	21	3-6	0-0	3-4	2	2	4	0	0	1	0	1	9
Michael Finley, Dal	10	5-6	1-2	0-0	0	1	1	0	0	0	1	0	11
David Robinson, Sas	7	0-1	0-0	0-0	1	1	2	0	1	0	1	0	0
John Stockton, Uta	11	5-5	0-0	0-0	0	0	0	2	2	1	0	0	10
Karl Malone, Uta	3	0-1	0-0	0-0	0	0	0	0	0	0	0	0	0
TOTAL	240	61-115	5-17	10-13	21	37	58	42	15	13	19	6	137

* starters

== All-Star Weekend ==
=== Rising Stars Challenge ===
The Rising Stars Challenge was held on Saturday, February 12, 2000. It featured the best first-year players ('Rookies') against the best second-year players ('Sophomores'). Al Attles and Bill Russell served as head coaches for the rookies and sophomores, respectively.

Rookies
Pos.	Player	Team
G	Andre Miller	Cleveland Cavaliers
F/C	Elton Brand	Chicago Bulls
F	Lamar Odom	Los Angeles Clippers
G	Steve Francis	Houston Rockets
F	James Posey	Denver Nuggets
G/F	Adrian Griffin	Boston Celtics
C	Todd MacCulloch	Philadelphia 76ers
F	Wally Szczerbiak	Minnesota Timberwolves
Head coach: Al Attles
Assistant coach: Nate Thurmond

Sophomores
Pos.	Player	Team
F	Dirk Nowitzki	Dallas Mavericks
F	Paul Pierce	Boston Celtics
F/C	Raef LaFrentz	Denver Nuggets
G	Cuttino Mobley	Houston Rockets
G	Jason Williams	Sacramento Kings
G	Mike Bibby	Vancouver Grizzlies
G	Michael Dickerson	Vancouver Grizzlies
C	Michael Olowokandi	Los Angeles Clippers
F	Antawn Jamison^{INJ}	Golden State Warriors
Head coach: Bill Russell
Assistant coach: KC Jones

^INJ Antawn Jamison was unable to participate due to injury.

=== Slam Dunk Contest ===
Contestants
Pos.	Player	Team	Height	Weight	Pct
G/F	Vince Carter	Toronto Raptors	6–6	220	
G/F	Ricky Davis	Charlotte Hornets	6-7	195	
G	Steve Francis	Houston Rockets	6–3	210	
G/F	Larry Hughes	Philadelphia 76ers	6–5	185	
G/F	Tracy McGrady	Toronto Raptors	6–8	225	
G/F	Jerry Stackhouse	Detroit Pistons	6–6	218	

=== Three-Point Contest ===
Contestants
Pos.	Player	Team	Height	Weight	First round	Final round
G	Jeff Hornacek	Utah Jazz	6–4	190	17	13
F	Dirk Nowitzki	Dallas Mavericks	7–0	245	18	11
G	Ray Allen	Milwaukee Bucks	6–5	205	16	10
G	Mike Bibby	Vancouver Grizzlies	6–2	195	15	—
G	Terry Porter	San Antonio Spurs	6–3	195	15	—
G	Hubert Davis	Dallas Mavericks	6–5	183	14	—
G	Allen Iverson	Philadelphia 76ers	6–0	165	10	—
G	Bob Sura	Cleveland Cavaliers	6–5	200	9	—
