= Allan Houston =

American basketball player (born 1971)

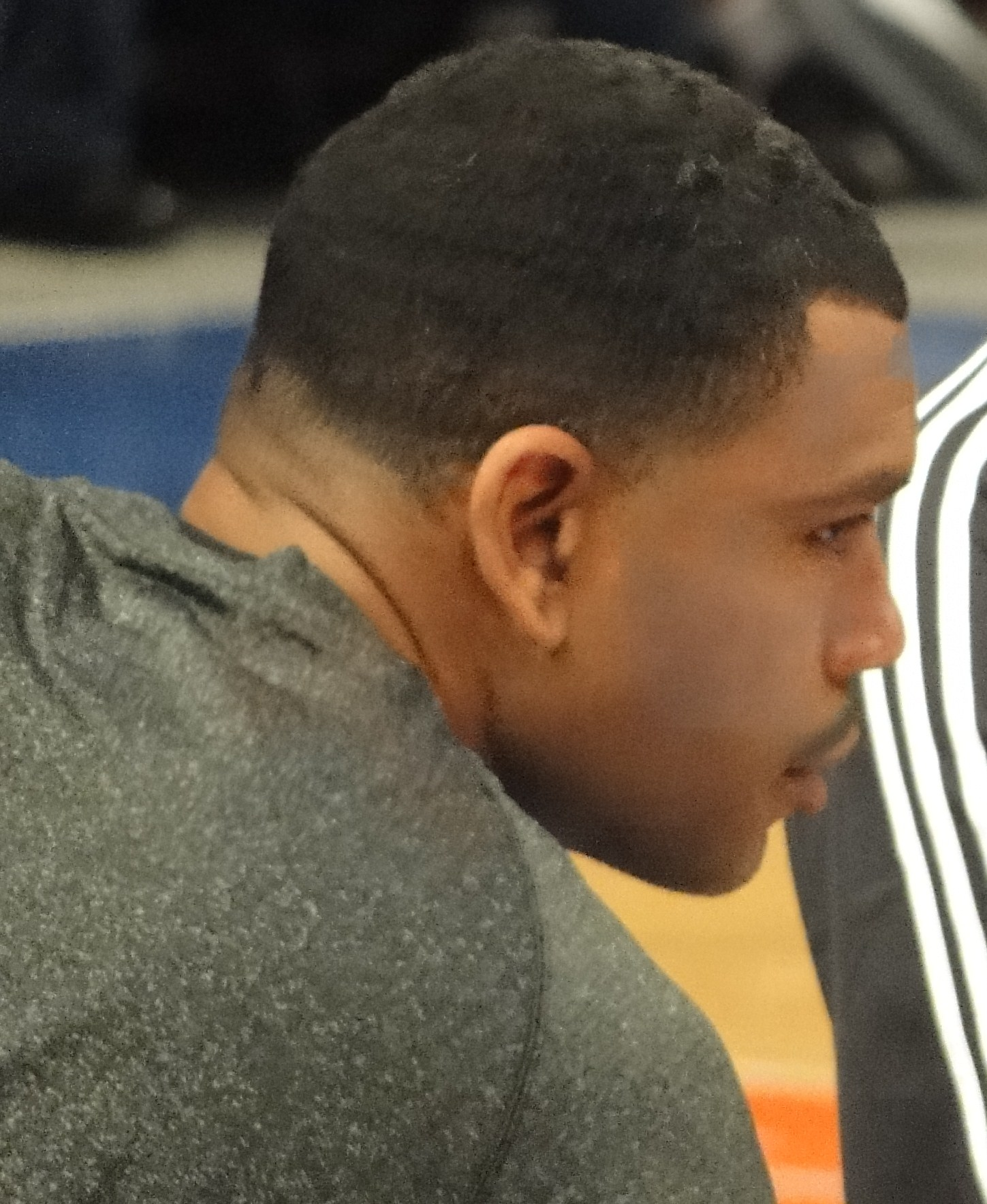
- Houston in 2009

Westchester Knicks
- Title: General manager
- League: NBA G League

Personal information
- Born: April 20, 1971 (age 55) Louisville, Kentucky, U.S.
- Listed height: 6 ft 6 in (1.98 m)
- Listed weight: 205 lb (93 kg)

Career information
- High school: Ballard (Louisville, Kentucky)
- College: Tennessee (1989–1993)
- NBA draft: 1993: 1st round, 11th overall pick
- Drafted by: Detroit Pistons
- Playing career: 1993–2005
- Position: Shooting guard
- Number: 20

Career history
- 1993–1996: Detroit Pistons
- 1996–2005: New York Knicks

Career highlights
- As player: 2× NBA All-Star (2000, 2001); Third-team All-American – AP, UPI (1993); Third-team All-American – NABC (1992); 4x First-team All-SEC (1990–1993); SEC All-Freshman Team (1990); SEC tournament MVP (1991); No. 20 retired by Tennessee Volunteers; McDonald's All-American (1989); First-team Parade All-American (1989); Kentucky Mr. Basketball (1989); As executive: NBA champion (2026); NBA Cup champion (2025)

Career NBA statistics
- Points: 14,551 (17.3 ppg)
- Rebounds: 2,434 (2.9 rpg)
- Assists: 1,990 (2.4 apg)
- Stats at NBA.com
- Stats at Basketball Reference
Medals
Men's basketball
Representing the United States
Olympic Games
Gold medal – first place	2000 Sydney	Team competition
FIBA Americas Championship
Gold medal – first place	1999 San Juan	Team competition
FIBA Americas U18 Championship
Gold medal – first place	1990 Montevideo	Team competition

Allan Wade Houston Jr. (born April 20, 1971) is an American former professional basketball player who played in the National Basketball Association (NBA) from 1993 to 2005. A shooting guard, Houston played nine seasons for the New York Knicks; he was a member of the Knicks' 1999 NBA Finals team. Houston made the NBA All-Star Team twice and also won a gold medal as a member of the U.S. men's basketball team at the 2000 Summer Olympics.

As of July 2019, Houston serves as special assistant to the general manager for the New York Knicks and general manager of the Knicks' G League team, the Westchester Knicks.

== High school and college career ==
Houston was born in Louisville, Kentucky and played at Ballard High School in Louisville as they won the 1988 Kentucky state championship. He went on to play at the University of Tennessee (where he played under his coach and father Wade) and graduated in 1993 as the school's all-time leading scorer, and is currently second to Chris Lofton at Tennessee for three-point field goals made. Houston is a member of Kappa Alpha Psi fraternity. On March 6, 2011, the University of Tennessee retired Houston's number (20) during halftime ceremonies at a Tennessee-Kentucky game.

== Professional career ==
=== Detroit Pistons (1993–1996) ===
Houston was selected in the first round (eleventh overall) by the Detroit Pistons in the 1993 NBA draft, and averaged 8.5 points per game in his rookie year. His average increased to 14.5 and 19.7 points per game in the next two years.

=== New York Knicks (1996–2005) ===
In 1996, after his rookie contract expired, Houston signed as a free agent with the New York Knicks, for whom he played for the next nine seasons. In his first year as a Knick, Houston took the place of John Starks in the starting lineup, with Starks serving as a mentor for him coming off the bench. Houston kept his scoring average at 17 points per game, and helped lead the team to the 1999 NBA Finals. His most famous play came in the decisive Game 5 of the first round of the 1999 Eastern Conference quarterfinals against the Miami Heat. In the fourth quarter, with the Knicks inbounding the ball trailing by one point, Houston caught the inbounds pass, and made a running jumper in the lane with 0.8 second left on the clock to win the game and the series for the Knicks, 78–77, which was then only the second time in NBA playoffs history where a #8 seed had defeated a #1. The Knicks would then defeat the Atlanta Hawks and Indiana Pacers to advance to the NBA Finals. Houston averaged 21.6 points per game in the only Finals appearance of his career, including a memorable 34 point performance in a game 3 victory over San Antonio. The Knicks, decimated by injuries to Patrick Ewing and Larry Johnson, would lose the series 4–1.

During his career, Houston was known for his three-point shooting prowess. Houston also made the All-Star team twice. Despite the on-court accolades, though, Houston's lasting legacy may be something that happened off the court: In 2001, Houston signed a six-year, $100.4 million contract extension with the Knicks. Houston's yearly salary of over $20 million made him virtually untradeable, and his injury problems would burden the Knicks. Houston missed 32 games in 2003–04 due to a knee injury, and despite claims in the summer of 2004 that he would be ready to play the next season (he even refused to have surgery on his knee that summer), he played in only 20 games that season because his injury had not completely healed. Knee injuries would eventually force Houston to announce his retirement on October 17, 2005. Houston attempted to return to the NBA in 2007, but decided to end his comeback attempt on October 20, 2007, because of bad timing in choosing to join the team so late into preparation for the regular season. Houston was signed by the Knicks to play in 2008, but was cut before the end of the preseason without appearing in a game.

In 2005, the NBA agreed on a new collective bargaining agreement with the players' union. The agreement included an amnesty clause provision allowing teams to release one player without his contract counting against the NBA's luxury tax threshold. The clause did not negate a player's contract, a team's obligation to pay a player, or a contract's impact on the salary cap; it merely made it possible to remove a released player's salary from luxury tax calculations on a one-time basis. The clause benefited teams that were in danger of facing the luxury tax, which was a penalty paid by teams with payrolls exceeding a certain threshold. Because the Knicks were expected to use the amnesty clause to waive Houston due to his expensive contract and injury woes (as of the 2005 offseason, two years and $40 million remained on his contract), the amnesty clause was dubbed the "Allan Houston Rule." After Houston assured his team that he would retire if his knee problems recurred in training camp that fall, the Knicks chose not to use the amnesty clause to release him; instead, they released forward Jerome Williams.

Houston's final NBA game was played on January 19, 2005, in an 81–98 loss to the Toronto Raptors where he recorded 3 points, 4 assists, 1 rebound and 1 steal while playing 28 minutes off the bench.

== National team career ==
Houston was a member of the USA men's national basketball team that won the gold medal at the 2000 Summer Olympics in Sydney, Australia, and the 1999 Tournament of the Americas, in San Juan, Puerto Rico.

== Executive career ==
In 2008, Houston was hired by the New York Knicks as assistant to the president for basketball operations. In December 2010, Houston was promoted to the position of assistant general manager. As of July 2019, Houston is special assistant to the general manager of the Knicks; he was also general manager of the Westchester Knicks, the organization's G League affiliate.

== Personal life ==
Houston married his wife, Tamara, in 1996. The couple has seven children, five daughters and two sons.

== NBA career statistics ==
Legend
GP	Games played	GS	Games started	MPG	Minutes per game
FG%	Field goal percentage	3P%	3-point field goal percentage	FT%	Free throw percentage
RPG	Rebounds per game	APG	Assists per game	SPG	Steals per game
BPG	Blocks per game	PPG	Points per game	**Bold**	Career high
*	Led the league

=== Regular season ===
Year	Team	GP	GS	MPG	FG%	3P%	FT%	RPG	APG	SPG	BPG	PPG
1993–94	Detroit	79	20	19.2	.405	.299	.824	1.5	1.3	.4	.2	8.5
1994–95	Detroit	76	39	26.3	.463	.424	.860	2.2	2.2	**.8**	.2	14.5
1995–96	Detroit	**82**	75	37.5	.453	.427	.823	**3.7**	**3.0**	.7	.2	19.7
1996–97	New York	81	81	33.1	.423	.385	.803	3.0	2.2	.5	.2	14.8
1997–98	New York	**82***	**82***	34.7	.447	.385	.851	3.3	2.6	**.8**	**.3**	18.4
1998–99	New York	50*	50*	36.3	.418	.407	.862	3.0	2.7	.7	.2	16.3
1999–00	New York	**82**	**82***	**38.6**	**.483**	**.436**	.838	3.3	2.7	**.8**	.2	19.7
2000–01	New York	78	78	36.6	.449	.381	.909	3.6	2.2	.7	.1	19.7
2001–02	New York	77	77	37.8	.437	.393	.870	3.3	2.5	.7	.1	20.4
2002–03	New York	**82**	**82***	37.9	.445	.396	**.919***	2.8	2.7	.7	.1	**22.5**
2003–04	New York	50	50	36.0	.435	.431	.913	2.4	2.0	**.8**	.0	18.5
2004–05	New York	20	11	26.6	.415	.388	.837	1.2	2.1	.4	.1	11.9
Career		839	727	33.7	.444	.402	.863	2.9	2.4	.7	.2	17.3
All-Star		2	0	16.5	.333	.400	1.000	1.5	2.5	.5	.0	8.0

=== Playoffs ===
Year	Team	GP	GS	MPG	FG%	3P%	FT%	RPG	APG	SPG	BPG	PPG
1996	Detroit	3	3	**45.3**	.431	.333	.900	2.7	2.0	.0	**.3**	**25.0**
1997	New York	9	9	40.0	.436	.500	.886	2.6	2.3	.7	**.3**	19.2
1998	New York	10	10	40.3	.434	.391	.862	**3.8**	**2.8**	.5	.1	21.1
1999	New York	**20**	**20**	39.2	.443	.250	.883	2.7	2.6	.4	.1	18.5
2000	New York	16	16	40.9	.438	.500	.862	3.3	1.6	**1.2**	.2	17.6
2001	New York	5	5	37.8	**.594**	**.545**	**1.000**	1.8	1.4	1.0	.2	20.8
Career		63	63	40.1	.448	.420	.884	2.9	2.2	.7	.2	19.3

== Filmography ==
=== Film ===
Year	Title	Role	Notes
1999	Black and White	Dean Carter	
2004	Laws of Attraction	Adamo Shandela	

== See also ==
- List of National Basketball Association career 3-point field goal percentage leaders
- List of National Basketball Association career free throw percentage leaders
