= 2000–01 Sacramento Kings season =

NBA professional basketball team season

- Head coach: Rick Adelman
- President: Geoff Petrie
- General manager: Geoff Petrie
- Owners: Maloof family
- Arena: ARCO Arena

Results
- Record: 55–27 (.671)
- Place: Division: 2nd (Pacific); Conference: 3rd (Western)
- Playoff finish: Conference semifinals (lost to Lakers 0–4)
- Stats at Basketball Reference

Local media
- Television: KMAX-TV; Fox Sports Net Bay Area
- Radio: KHTK

The 2000–01 Sacramento Kings season was the 52nd season for the Sacramento Kings in the National Basketball Association, and their 16th season in Sacramento, California.

== Season summary ==
=== Off-season ===
The Kings had the 16th overall pick in the 2000 NBA draft, and selected small forward, and Turkish basketball star Hedo Türkoğlu. During the off-season, the team acquired Doug Christie from the Toronto Raptors, and signed free agent Bobby Jackson.

=== Regular season ===
With the addition of Christie, Jackson and Türkoğlu, the Kings got off to a fast start by winning 14 of their first 18 games of the regular season, on their way to a 27–10 start as of January 20, 2001, and later on held a 31–15 record at the All-Star break. The Kings challenged the Pacific Division all season long, falling just one game short with a solid 55–27 record, finishing in second place and earning the third seed in the Western Conference; the team also posted three five-game winning streaks, which was their longest winning streak during the regular season.

Chris Webber averaged 27.1 points, 11.1 rebounds, 4.2 assists, 1.3 steals and 1.7 blocks per game, and was named to the All-NBA First Team, while Peja Stojaković showed improvement becoming the team's starting small forward, averaging 20.4 points and 5.8 rebounds per game, and also leading the Kings with 144 three-point field goals, and Christie averaged 12.3 points and 2.3 steals per game, and was named to the NBA All-Defensive Second Team. In addition, Vlade Divac provided the team with 12.0 points and 8.3 rebounds per game, and Jason Williams contributed 9.4 points and 5.4 assists per game. Off the bench, Jackson contributed 7.2 points per game, while Scot Pollard averaged 6.5 points, 6.0 rebounds and 1.3 blocks per game, and Türkoğlu contributed 5.3 points per game, and was named to the NBA All-Rookie Second Team.

During the NBA All-Star weekend at the MCI Center in Washington, D.C., Webber and Divac were both selected for the 2001 NBA All-Star Game, as members of the Western Conference All-Star team, while head coach Rick Adelman was selected to coach the Western Conference; it was Divac's first and only All-Star appearance. In addition, Stojaković participated in the NBA Three-Point Shootout, and also won the NBA 2Ball Competition, along with Ruthie Bolton-Holifield of the WNBA's Sacramento Monarchs. Webber also finished in fourth place in Most Valuable Player voting with 5 first-place votes, while Stojaković finished in second place in Most Improved Player voting, behind Tracy McGrady of the Orlando Magic; Christie finished in fourth place in Defensive Player of the Year voting, while Jackson finished in fourth place in Sixth Man of the Year voting, and Adelman finished in second place in Coach of the Year voting, behind Larry Brown of the Philadelphia 76ers.

The Kings finished twelfth in the NBA in home-game attendance, with an attendance of 709,997 at the ARCO Arena II during the regular season.

=== NBA playoffs ===
In the Western Conference First Round of the 2001 NBA playoffs, the Kings faced off against the 6th–seeded Phoenix Suns, a team that featured the trio of All-Star guard Jason Kidd, second-year star Shawn Marion, and Clifford Robinson. The Kings lost Game 1 to the Suns at home, 86–83 at the ARCO Arena II, only shooting .348 in field-goal percentage. However, the team managed to win the next three games, which included a Game 4 road win over the Suns at the America West Arena, 89–82 to win the series in four games. It was the first time that the Kings won an NBA playoffs series since the 1980–81 season, back when the team was known as the Kansas City Kings.

In the Western Conference Semi-finals, and for the second consecutive year, the team faced off against the 2nd–seeded, and defending NBA champion Los Angeles Lakers, who won the Pacific Division title, and were led by All-Star center Shaquille O'Neal, All-Star guard Kobe Bryant, and Derek Fisher. The Kings lost the first two games to the Lakers on the road at the Staples Center, before losing the next two games at home, including a Game 4 loss to the Lakers at the ARCO Arena II, 119–113, thus losing the series in a four-game sweep.

The Lakers would advance to the NBA Finals for the second consecutive year, and defeat the 76ers in five games in the 2001 NBA Finals, winning their second consecutive NBA championship.

=== Aftermath ===
Following the season, the controversial guard Williams was traded along with Nick Anderson to the Memphis Grizzlies on draft day, while three-point specialist Jon Barry was traded to the Detroit Pistons, and Darrick Martin signed as a free agent with the Dallas Mavericks.

== Offseason ==
In the NBA draft, the Kings drafted Hedo Türkoğlu and Jabari Smith. Türkoğlu's tenure with the Kings lasted three seasons, while Smith's stint lasted 21 games. Smith would return to Sacramento in the 2003–04 season.

During the off-season, the Kings did not make many transactions. On August 1, the Kings signed guard Bobby Jackson. Jackson would be a reliable bench player during his tenure in Sacramento, and he would win the Sixth Man of the Year Award for the 2002–03 season.

On September 30, the Kings traded combo forward Corliss Williamson to the Toronto Raptors for Doug Christie. Christie would be the starting shooting guard for the Kings for his entire tenure with the team.

On October 20, the Kings waived center Jerome James. James had missed all of the previous season due to a knee injury.

=== Draft picks ===
Round	Pick	Player	Position	Nationality	College
1	16	Hidayet "Hedo" Türkoğlu	SF	Turkey	Efes Pilsen (Turkey)
2	45	Jabari Smith	C/PF	United States	LSU

== Roster ==
2000–01 Sacramento Kings roster
Players

Pos.	No.	Player	Height	Weight	DOB	From
G/F	25	Nick Anderson	6 ft 6 in (1.98 m)	205 lb (93 kg)	1968–01–20	Illinois
G	20	Jon Barry	6 ft 4 in (1.93 m)	195 lb (88 kg)	1969–07–25	Georgia Tech
G/F	13	Doug Christie	6 ft 6 in (1.98 m)	200 lb (91 kg)	1970–05–09	Pepperdine
C	21	Vlade Divac	7 ft 1 in (2.16 m)	243 lb (110 kg)	1968–02–03	Serbia
F	51	Lawrence Funderburke	6 ft 9 in (2.06 m)	230 lb (104 kg)	1970–12–15	Ohio State
G	24	Bobby Jackson	6 ft 1 in (1.85 m)	185 lb (84 kg)	1973–03–13	Minnesota
F	00	Art Long	6 ft 9 in (2.06 m)	250 lb (113 kg)	1972–10–01	Cincinnati
G	15	Darrick Martin	5 ft 11 in (1.80 m)	170 lb (77 kg)	1971–03–06	UCLA
F/C	31	Scot Pollard	6 ft 11 in (2.11 m)	265 lb (120 kg)	1975–02–12	Kansas
C	52	Jabari Smith	6 ft 11 in (2.11 m)	250 lb (113 kg)	1977–02–12	LSU
F	16	Peja Stojaković	6 ft 9 in (2.06 m)	220 lb (100 kg)	1977–06–09	Serbia
F	5	Hedo Türkoğlu	6 ft 10 in (2.08 m)	220 lb (100 kg)	1977–03–19	Turkey
F/C	4	Chris Webber	6 ft 10 in (2.08 m)	245 lb (111 kg)	1973–03–01	Michigan
G	55	Jason Williams	6 ft 1 in (1.85 m)	190 lb (86 kg)	1975–11–18	Florida

Coaches
Head coach
- Rick Adelman
Assistant(s)
- Pete Carril
- Elston Turner
- John Wetzel

Legend
- (DP) Unsigned draft pick
- (FA) Free agent
- (S) Suspended
- Injured

Roster
Updated: February 18, 2001

== Regular season ==
=== Season standings ===
Pacific Division	W	L	PCT	GB	Home	Road	Div
y-Los Angeles Lakers	56	26	.683	–	31–10	25–16	14–10
x-Sacramento Kings	55	27	.671	1	33–8	22–19	16–8
x-Phoenix Suns	51	31	.622	5	31–10	20–21	12–12
x-Portland Trail Blazers	50	32	.610	6	28–13	22–19	12–12
e-Seattle SuperSonics	44	38	.537	12	26–15	18–23	17–7
e-Los Angeles Clippers	31	51	378	25	22–19	9–32	9–15
e-Golden State Warriors	17	65	.207	39	11–30	6–35	4–20

Western Conference
#	Team	W	L	PCT	GB
1	z-San Antonio Spurs	58	24	.707	–
2	y-Los Angeles Lakers	56	26	.683	2
3	x-Sacramento Kings	55	27	.671	3
4	x-Utah Jazz	53	29	.646	5
5	x-Dallas Mavericks	53	29	.646	5
6	x-Phoenix Suns	51	31	.622	7
7	x-Portland Trail Blazers	50	32	.610	8
8	x-Minnesota Timberwolves	47	35	.573	11
9	e-Houston Rockets	45	37	.549	13
10	e-Seattle SuperSonics	44	38	.537	14
11	e-Denver Nuggets	40	42	.488	18
12	e-Los Angeles Clippers	31	51	.378	27
13	e-Vancouver Grizzlies	23	59	.280	35
14	e-Golden State Warriors	17	65	.207	41

z – clinched division title
y – clinched division title
x – clinched playoff spot

=== Game log ===
2000–01 game log
Total: 55–27 (home: 33–8; road: 22–19)
October: 1–0 (home: 0–0; road: 1–0)

Game	Date	Team	Score	High points	High rebounds	High assists	Location Attendance	Record
1	October 31	@ Chicago	W 100–81	Webber, Stojaković (23)	Webber, Stojaković (8)	Chris Webber (7)	United Center; 21,814	1–0

November: 9–4 (home: 6–1; road: 3–3)

Game	Date	Team	Score	High points	High rebounds	High assists	Location Attendance	Record
2	November 1	@ Cleveland	L 100–102 (2OT)	Chris Webber (27)	Chris Webber (8)	Webber, Jackson, Barry (5)	Gund Arena; 17,695	1–1
3	November 3	@ Detroit	W 100–93	Chris Webber (31)	Chris Webber (12)	Jon Barry (7)	The Palace of Auburn Hills; 22,076	2–1
4	November 4	@ Minnesota	L 91–99	Peja Stojaković (22)	Vlade Divac (12)	Stojaković, Jackson, Webber, Christie (3)	Target Center; 19,006	2–2
5	November 6	Portland	W 79–75	Chris Webber (29)	Vlade Divac (11)	Webber, Jackson (6)	ARCO Arena; 17,317	3–2
6	November 8	Golden State	W 115–84	Webber, Stojaković (27)	Chris Webber (9)	Jason Williams (12)	ARCO Arena; 17,317	4–2
7	November 10	@ Golden State	W 114–107 (OT)	Chris Webber (35)	Chris Webber (16)	Jason Williams (8)	The Arena in Oakland; 17,467	5–2
8	November 12	Dallas	W 109–84	Peja Stojaković (28)	Chris Webber (13)	Divac, Williams (7)	ARCO Arena; 17,317	6–2
9	November 14	Orlando	W 96–82	Peja Stojaković (27)	Stojaković, Divac (11)	Jason Williams (8)	ARCO Arena; 17,317	7–2
10	November 16	L.A. Lakers	L 110–112 (OT)	Doug Christie (32)	Peja Stojaković (17)	Jason Williams (7)	ARCO Arena; 17,317	7–3
11	November 22	Chicago	W 100–71	Chris Webber (29)	Chris Webber (13)	Jason Williams (7)	ARCO Arena; 17,317	8–3
12	November 25	Seattle	W 125–101	Peja Stojaković (29)	Chris Webber (14)	Jason Williams (10)	ARCO Arena; 17,317	9–3
13	November 28	@ Houston	W 88–81	Chris Webber (21)	Chris Webber (11)	Webber, Divac (4)	Compaq Center; 11,813	10–3
14	November 29	@ San Antonio	L 79–82	Chris Webber (25)	Chris Webber (17)	Bobby Jackson (6)	Alamodome; 17,341	10–4

December: 10–4 (home: 7–1; road: 3–3)

Game	Date	Team	Score	High points	High rebounds	High assists	Location Attendance	Record
15	December 1	Phoenix	W 105–98	Chris Webber (28)	Chris Webber (14)	Doug Christie (6)	ARCO Arena; 17,317	11–4
16	December 5	San Antonio	W 81–75	Chris Webber (30)	Webber, Stojaković (10)	Jason Williams (7)	ARCO Arena; 17,317	12–4
17	December 8	Houston	W 111–98	Chris Webber (37)	Chris Webber (18)	Doug Christie (8)	ARCO Arena; 17,317	13–4
18	December 10	Miami	W 101–97	Chris Webber (19)	Chris Webber (10)	Christie, Barry (5)	ARCO Arena; 17,317	14–4
19	December 12	@ Atlanta	L 99–107	Chris Webber (22)	Chris Webber (13)	Doug Christie (6)	Philips Arena; 18,113	14–5
20	December 13	@ Charlotte	L 90–101	Chris Webber (25)	Vlade Divac (8)	Webber, Christie, Barry (4)	Charlotte Coliseum; 12,806	14–6
21	December 15	@ Boston	W 104–81	Chris Webber (30)	Chris Webber (13)	Jason Williams (7)	FleetCenter; 15,486	15–6
22	December 17	@ New Jersey	W 95–79	Chris Webber (33)	Chris Webber (12)	Jon Barry (6)	Continental Airlines Arena; 13,011	16–6
23	December 19	Washington	W 106–72	Chris Webber (19)	Chris Webber (11)	Jon Barry (6)	ARCO Arena; 17,317	17–6
24	December 20	@ Seattle	L 85–89	Chris Webber (20)	Chris Webber (13)	Webber, Williams (5)	KeyArena; 17,072	17–7
25	December 22	@ Vancouver	W 95–93	Chris Webber (33)	Chris Webber (12)	Vlade Divac (7)	General Motors Place; 14,656	18–7
26	December 23	Seattle	W 97–92	Chris Webber (23)	Chris Webber (11)	Vlade Divac (4)	ARCO Arena; 17,317	19–7
27	December 28	Charlotte	W 91–87	Chris Webber (24)	Chris Webber (10)	Webber, Divac, Williams, Jackson (4)	ARCO Arena; 17,317	20–7
28	December 30	Philadelphia	L 104–107 (OT)	Peja Stojaković (33)	Chris Webber (10)	Jason Williams (5)	ARCO Arena; 17,317	20–8

January: 10–4 (home: 6–2; road: 4–2)

Game	Date	Team	Score	High points	High rebounds	High assists	Location Attendance	Record
29	January 2	Phoenix	W 121–117 (OT)	Vlade Divac (34)	Vlade Divac (12)	Vlade Divac (6)	ARCO Arena; 17,317	21–8
30	January 5	Indiana	L 91–93 (OT)	Chris Webber (51)	Chris Webber (26)	Jason Williams (6)	ARCO Arena; 17,317	21–9
31	January 8	Minnesota	W 100–97	Peja Stojaković (24)	Webber, Stojaković (9)	Jason Williams (7)	ARCO Arena; 17,317	22–9
32	January 10	Cleveland	W 108–103	Chris Webber (30)	Chris Webber (14)	Jason Williams (8)	ARCO Arena; 17,317	23–9
33	January 12	@ Denver	L 93–106	Chris Webber (24)	Chris Webber (14)	Jason Williams (8)	Pepsi Center; 17,512	23–10
34	January 13	@ Houston	W 84–81	Chris Webber (31)	Chris Webber (14)	Chris Webber (5)	Compaq Center; 14,552	24–10
35	January 15	@ Dallas	W 116–105	Chris Webber (34)	Chris Webber (12)	Doug Christie (6)	Reunion Arena; 18,187	25–10
36	January 17	Boston	W 111–106	Chris Webber (30)	Vlade Divac (11)	Jason Williams (8)	ARCO Arena; 17,317	26–10
37	January 20	@ Portland	W 111–101	Chris Webber (34)	Chris Webber (10)	Chris Webber (6)	Rose Garden; 20,580	27–10
38	January 21	@ Seattle	L 107–109	Peja Stojaković (30)	Chris Webber (18)	Divac, Barry (5)	KeyArena; 17,072	27–11
39	January 23	New Jersey	W 130–104	Chris Webber (25)	Vlade Divac (10)	Chris Webber (10)	ARCO Arena; 17,317	28–11
40	January 25	San Antonio	L 91–97	Stojaković, Webber (23)	Chris Webber (11)	Divac, Williams (4)	ARCO Arena; 17,317	28–12
41	January 27	@ L.A. Clippers	W 101–89	Chris Webber (33)	Webber, Divac (11)	Webber, Christie, Williams (5)	Staples Center; 19,341	29–12
42	January 30	Golden State	W 105–79	Chris Webber (28)	Chris Webber (12)	Jason Williams (9)	ARCO Arena; 17,317	30–12

February: 8–6 (home: 4–1; road: 4–5)

Game	Date	Team	Score	High points	High rebounds	High assists	Location Attendance	Record
43	February 2	Vancouver	W 105–95	Chris Webber (41)	Chris Webber (15)	Jason Williams (6)	ARCO Arena; 17,317	31–12
44	February 4	@ L.A. Lakers	L 94–100	Chris Webber (25)	Doug Christie (11)	Chris Webber (9)	Staples Center; 18,997	31–13
45	February 6	@ Milwaukee	L 109–112	Chris Webber (39)	Chris Webber (11)	Chris Webber (8)	Bradley Center; 17,329	31–14
46	February 7	@ Minnesota	L 88–117	Chris Webber (22)	Webber, Türkoğlu, Anderson (5)	Nick Anderson (5)	Target Center; 18,274	31–15
47	February 13	@ Utah	W 97–94 (OT)	Chris Webber (34)	Webber, Stojaković, Pollard (8)	Doug Christie (4)	Delta Center; 19,485	32–15
48	February 15	@ Portland	L 81–105	Vlade Divac (19)	Vlade Divac (8)	Jason Williams (4)	Rose Garden; 20,471	32–16
49	February 16	Denver	W 117–84	Peja Stojaković (29)	Scot Pollard (11)	Doug Christie (8)	ARCO Arena; 17,317	33–16
50	February 18	Utah	L 90–94	Peja Stojaković (27)	Doug Christie (9)	Jason Williams (6)	ARCO Arena; 17,317	33–17
51	February 20	Atlanta	W 94–80	Jason Williams (22)	Vlade Divac (19)	Jason Williams (7)	ARCO Arena; 17,317	34–17
52	February 22	@ Washington	W 115–110	Doug Christie (32)	Scot Pollard (14)	Jason Williams (9)	MCI Center; 19,911	35–17
53	February 23	@ Toronto	W 119–118 (3OT)	Peja Stojaković (39)	Scot Pollard (17)	Jason Williams (6)	Air Canada Centre; 19,800	36–17
54	February 25	@ New York	L 86–88	Peja Stojaković (26)	Scot Pollard (13)	Peja Stojaković (7)	Madison Square Garden; 19,763	36–18
55	February 27	L.A. Clippers	W 106–93 (OT)	Peja Stojaković (25)	Vlade Divac (12)	Jason Williams (6)	ARCO Arena; 17,317	37–18
56	February 28	@ Golden State	W 122–101	Peja Stojaković (24)	Scot Pollard (10)	Jason Williams (10)	The Arena in Oakland; 19,107	38–18

March: 11–4 (home: 7–1; road: 4–3)

Game	Date	Team	Score	High points	High rebounds	High assists	Location Attendance	Record
57	March 2	@ L.A. Clippers	L 81–88	Peja Stojaković (31)	Scot Pollard (18)	Vlade Divac (5)	Staples Center; 19,415	38–19
58	March 6	Toronto	W 98–91	Christie, Webber, Williams (19)	Vlade Divac (17)	Jason Williams (6)	ARCO Arena; 17,317	39–19
59	March 7	@ Phoenix	W 100–89	Chris Webber (41)	Chris Webber (14)	Bobby Jackson (6)	America West Arena; 19,023	40–19
60	March 9	Denver	W 110–104	Chris Webber (41)	Chris Webber (12)	Divac, Williams (6)	ARCO Arena; 17,317	41–19
61	March 11	Utah	W 105–90	Peja Stojaković (31)	Webber, Stojaković, Divac (6)	Chris Webber (8)	ARCO Arena; 17,317	42–19
62	March 13	@ Orlando	W 114–108 (OT)	Chris Webber (33)	Chris Webber (15)	Chris Webber (7)	TD Waterhouse Centre; 16,157	43–19
63	March 14	@ Miami	L 104–114	Chris Webber (26)	Chris Webber (17)	Jason Williams (9)	American Airlines Arena; 19,600	43–20
64	March 16	@ Philadelphia	W 100–79	Chris Webber (26)	Chris Webber (11)	Peja Stojaković (7)	First Union Center; 20,866	44–20
65	March 18	@ Indiana	L 95–101	Peja Stojaković (27)	Chris Webber (15)	Jason Williams (5)	Conseco Fieldhouse; 18,345	44–21
66	March 20	Houston	W 125–109	Peja Stojaković (29)	Chris Webber (10)	Chris Webber (12)	ARCO Arena; 17,317	45–21
67	March 22	Detroit	W 103–98	Chris Webber (29)	Chris Webber (15)	Chris Webber (7)	ARCO Arena; 17,317	46–21
68	March 25	L.A. Lakers	L 72–84	Webber, Christie (15)	Vlade Divac (14)	Chris Webber (4)	ARCO Arena; 17,317	46–22
69	March 27	New York	W 124–117 (OT)	Chris Webber (39)	Chris Webber (15)	Jason Williams (8)	ARCO Arena; 17,317	47–22
70	March 28	@ L.A. Lakers	W 108–84	Chris Webber (25)	Chris Webber (12)	Jason Williams (6)	Staples Center; 18,997	48–22
71	March 30	Minnesota	W 110–98	Chris Webber (22)	Scot Pollard (13)	Chris Webber (5)	ARCO Arena; 17,317	49–22

April: 6–5 (home: 3–2; road: 3–3)

Game	Date	Team	Score	High points	High rebounds	High assists	Location Attendance	Record
72	April 1	Dallas	L 107–119	Chris Webber (27)	Webber, Christie (10)	Doug Christie (6)	ARCO Arena; 17,317	49–23
73	April 3	Milwaukee	L 101–107	Chris Webber (28)	Christie, Webber (11)	Jason Williams (9)	ARCO Arena; 17,317	49–24
74	April 5	@ Utah	W 92–86	Chris Webber (26)	Vlade Divac (12)	Jason Williams (7)	Delta Center; 19,911	50–24
75	April 6	@ Vancouver	W 118–90	Chris Webber (36)	Vlade Divac (12)	Jason Williams (8)	General Motors Place; 14,863	51–24
76	April 8	Portland	W 98–89	Webber, Stojaković (20)	Vlade Divac (17)	Chris Webber (5)	ARCO Arena; 17,317	52–24
77	April 10	L.A. Clippers	W 116–109 (OT)	Chris Webber (31)	Chris Weber (11)	Doug Christie (6)	ARCO Arena; 17,317	53–24
78	April 12	@ San Antonio	W 107–105 (OT)	Chris Webber (26)	Divac, Webber (13)	Jason Williams (9)	Alamodome; 34,357	54–24
79	April 13	@ Dallas	L 97–101	Chris Webber (24)	Chris Webber (13)	Divac, Williams (4)	Reunion Arena; 18,187	54–25
80	April 15	@ Phoenix	L 86–88	Chris Webber (22)	Peja Stojaković (12)	Jason Williams (5)	America West Arena; 19,023	54–26
81	April 16	Vancouver	W 110–100	Peja Stojaković (31)	Vlade Divac (16)	Stojaković, Christie, Divac, Williams (5)	ARCO Arena; 17,317	55–26
82	April 18	@ Denver	L 100–110	Scot Pollard (18)	Scot Pollard (14)	Jon Barry (7)	Pepsi Center; 18,495	55–27

2000–01 schedule

== Playoffs ==
2001 playoff game log
First round: 3–1 (home: 1–1; road: 2–0)

Game	Date	Team	Score	High points	High rebounds	High assists	Location Attendance	Series
1	April 22	Phoenix	L 83–86	Chris Webber (27)	Chris Webber (15)	Christie, Williams (5)	ARCO Arena; 17,317	0–1
2	April 25	Phoenix	W 116–90	Peja Stojaković (22)	Jackson, Webber (9)	Chris Webber (5)	ARCO Arena; 17,317	1–1
3	April 29	@ Phoenix	W 104–96	Chris Webber (23)	Vlade Divac (12)	Doug Christie (4)	America West Arena; 19,023	2–1
4	May 2	@ Phoenix	W 89–82	Peja Stojaković (37)	Scot Pollard (13)	Bobby Jackson (5)	America West Arena; 18,836	3–1

Conference Semi-finals: 0–4 (home: 0–2; road: 0–2)

Game	Date	Team	Score	High points	High rebounds	High assists	Location Attendance	Series
1	May 6	@ L.A. Lakers	L 105–108	Chris Webber (34)	Scot Pollard (14)	Jason Williams (4)	Staples Center; 18,997	0–1
2	May 8	@ L.A. Lakers	L 90–96	Chris Webber (22)	Chris Webber (18)	Bobby Jackson (4)	Staples Center; 18,997	0–2
3	May 11	L.A. Lakers	L 81–103	Chris Webber (28)	Chris Webber (14)	Doug Christie (5)	ARCO Arena; 17,317	0–3
4	May 13	L.A. Lakers	L 113–119	Peja Stojaković (26)	Chris Webber (11)	Chris Webber (8)	ARCO Arena; 17,317	0–4

2001 schedule

== Player statistics ==
Legend
GP	Games played	GS	Games started	MPG	Minutes per game
FG%	Field-goal percentage	3P%	3-point field-goal percentage	FT%	Free-throw percentage
RPG	Rebounds per game	APG	Assists per game	SPG	Steals per game
BPG	Blocks per game	PPG	Points per game

=== Regular season ===
Player	GP	GS	MPG	FG%	3P%	FT%	RPG	APG	SPG	BPG	PPG
Nick Anderson	21	0	8.0	.246	.256		1.2	.6	.5	.2	1.8
Jon Barry	62	2	16.3	.404	.348	.877	1.5	2.1	.5	.1	5.1
Doug Christie	81	81	36.3	.395	.376	.897	4.4	3.6	2.3	.6	12.3
Vlade Divac	81	81	29.9	.482	.286	.691	8.3	2.9	1.1	1.1	12.0
Lawrence Funderburke	59	2	11.8	.496		.623	3.3	.3	.2	.2	4.9
Bobby Jackson	79	7	20.9	.439	.375	.739	3.1	2.0	1.1	.1	7.2
Art Long	9	0	2.2	.000		.000	.9	.1	.0	.3	0.0
Darrick Martin	31	0	5.7	.382	.519	.886	.5	.5	.2	.0	3.3
Scot Pollard	77	8	21.5	.468	.000	.749	6.0	.6	.6	1.3	6.5
Jabari Smith	9	0	7.3	.500		.667	.9	.7	.4	.0	2.9
Peja Stojaković	75	75	38.7	.470	.400	.856	5.8	2.2	1.2	.2	20.4
Hedo Türkoğlu	74	7	16.8	.412	.326	.777	2.8	.9	.7	.3	5.3
Chris Webber	70	70	40.5	.481	.071	.703	11.1	4.2	1.3	1.7	27.1
Jason Williams	77	77	29.7	.407	.315	.789	2.4	5.4	1.2	.1	9.4

=== Playoffs ===
Player	GP	GS	MPG	FG%	3P%	FT%	RPG	APG	SPG	BPG	PPG
Jon Barry	7	0	7.9	.412	.286		.4	.6	.1	.0	2.3
Doug Christie	8	8	38.0	.368	.294	.828	4.4	3.3	2.5	1.1	9.9
Vlade Divac	8	8	28.1	.350	.333	.763	8.4	2.4	1.0	1.5	10.8
Lawrence Funderburke	3	0	5.7	.375		1.000	2.0	.0	.7	.7	2.3
Bobby Jackson	8	0	22.8	.438	.286	.714	3.3	2.3	1.0	.0	7.0
Darrick Martin	2	0	4.5	.000	.000		.0	1.5	.0	.0	0.0
Scot Pollard	8	0	17.6	.633		.588	6.9	.3	.1	.9	6.0
Peja Stojaković	8	8	38.4	.406	.346	.968	6.4	.4	.6	.4	21.6
Hedo Türkoğlu	8	0	17.6	.435	.571	1.000	3.5	1.4	.4	.1	7.5
Chris Webber	8	8	43.5	.388	.000	.694	11.5	3.1	1.1	1.0	23.3
Jason Williams	8	8	23.9	.426	.367	1.000	2.3	2.9	1.0	.0	8.8

Player statistics citation:

== Awards and records ==
- Doug Christie, NBA All-Defensive Second Team
- Vlade Divac, 2001 NBA All-Star Game
- Hedo Türkoğlu, NBA All-Rookie Second Team
- Chris Webber, 2001 NBA All-Star Game
- Chris Webber, Player of the Week (Dec. 10)
- Chris Webber, Player of the Week (Jan. 21)
- Chris Webber, All-NBA First Team
- Geoff Petrie, NBA Executive of the Year
- Rick Adelman, Western Conference All-Stars Head Coach

== Transactions ==
=== Trades ===
September 30, 2000
To Sacramento Kings

- Doug Christie
To Toronto Raptors

- Corliss Williamson

=== Free agents ===
==== Additions ====
Player	Signed	Former team
Bobby Jackson	August 1	Minnesota Timberwolves
Art Long	February 18	ASVEL Villeurbanne (France)

==== Subtractions ====
Player	Left	New team
Jerome James	waived, October 20	KK Budućnost (Montenegro)

Player Transactions Citation:

== See also ==
- 2000–01 NBA season
