= 2000–01 Indiana Pacers season =

NBA professional basketball team season

- Head coach: Isiah Thomas
- General manager: Donnie Walsh
- Arena: Conseco Fieldhouse

Results
- Record: 41–41 (.500)
- Place: Division: 4th (Central); Conference: 8th (Eastern)
- Playoff finish: First Round (lost to 76ers 1–3)
- Stats at Basketball Reference

Local media
- Television: Fox Sports Net Midwest, WTTV
- Radio: WIBC

The 2000–01 Indiana Pacers season was the 25th season for the Indiana Pacers in the National Basketball Association, and their 34th season as a franchise. The Pacers were coming off of an NBA Finals defeat to the Los Angeles Lakers in six games in the 2000 NBA Finals.

== Season summary ==
=== Off-season ===
During the off-season, the Pacers hired former Indiana University star, and retired Detroit Pistons All-Star guard Isiah Thomas as their new head coach. The team also acquired Jermaine O'Neal from the Portland Trail Blazers, and signed free agent Tyus Edney.

=== Regular season ===
Under Thomas along with the addition of O'Neal, and with the departures of veteran players from the team that reached the Finals last year, the Pacers got off to a 5–2 start to the regular season, but then struggled losing six of their next seven games, and later on held a 21–27 record at the All-Star break. The Pacers played mediocre basketball all season long, and finished in fourth place in the Central Division with a 41–41 record; to qualify for the NBA playoffs, the Pacers needed to win nine of their final eleven games to secure the eighth seed in the Eastern Conference.

Last season's Most Improved Player Jalen Rose averaged 20.5 points, 5.0 rebounds and 6.0 assists per game, while Reggie Miller averaged 18.9 points per game, and led the Pacers with 170 three-point field goals, and O'Neal provided the team with 12.9 points, 9.8 rebounds and 2.8 blocks per game. In addition, Travis Best contributed 11.9 points, 6.1 assists and 1.4 steals per game, while Austin Croshere provided with 10.1 points and 4.8 rebounds per game, and Al Harrington averaged 7.5 points and 4.9 rebounds per game. Meanwhile, Žan Tabak averaged 3.9 points and rebounds per game each, Sam Perkins contributed 3.8 points per game, and second-year center Jeff Foster provided with 3.5 points and 5.5 rebounds per game.

During the NBA All-Star weekend at the MCI Center in Washington, D.C., second-year forward Jonathan Bender participated in the NBA Slam Dunk Contest. Best finished in fifth place in Sixth Man of the Year voting, and also finished tied in seventh place in Most Improved Player voting. The Pacers finished tenth in the NBA in home-game attendance, with an attendance of 731,800 at the Conseco Fieldhouse during the regular season.

=== NBA playoffs ===
In the Eastern Conference First Round of the 2001 NBA playoffs, and for the third consecutive year, the Pacers faced off against the top–seeded, and Atlantic Division champion Philadelphia 76ers, who were led by All-Star guard, and Most Valuable Player of the Year, Allen Iverson, All-Star center and Defensive Player of the Year, Dikembe Mutombo, and Sixth Man of the Year, Aaron McKie. The Pacers managed to win Game 1 over the 76ers on the road, 79–78 at the First Union Center. However, the team lost the next three games, which included a Game 4 loss to the 76ers at home, 88–85 at the Conseco Fieldhouse, thus losing the series in four games.

The 76ers would advance to the 2001 NBA Finals, but would lose to the defending NBA champion Los Angeles Lakers in five games.

=== Aftermath ===
Following the season, Perkins was released to free agency and then retired, while Derrick McKey signed as a free agent with the Philadelphia 76ers during the following season, and Edney and Tabak were both released to free agency.

== Offseason ==
=== NBA draft ===
Round	Pick	Player	Position	Nationality	College
1	27	Primož Brezec	C	Slovenia	Union Olimpija (Slovenia)
2	56	Jaquay Walls	SG	United States	Colorado

== Roster ==
2000–01 Indiana Pacers roster
Players

Pos.	No.	Player	Height	Weight	DOB	From
F	24	Jonathan Bender	6 ft 11 in (2.11 m)	202 lb (92 kg)	1981–01–30	Picayune Memorial HS (MS)
G	4	Travis Best	5 ft 11 in (1.80 m)	182 lb (83 kg)	1972–07–12	Georgia Tech
F	44	Austin Croshere	6 ft 9 in (2.06 m)	235 lb (107 kg)	1975–05–01	Providence
G	2	Tyus Edney	5 ft 10 in (1.78 m)	184 lb (83 kg)	1973–02–14	UCLA
C	10	Jeff Foster	6 ft 11 in (2.11 m)	250 lb (113 kg)	1977–01–16	Texas State
F	3	Al Harrington	6 ft 9 in (2.06 m)	230 lb (104 kg)	1980–02–17	St. Patrick HS (NJ)
F	8	Lari Ketner (injured)	6 ft 9 in (2.06 m)	277 lb (126 kg)	1977–02–01	UMass
F	9	Derrick McKey	6 ft 9 in (2.06 m)	205 lb (93 kg)	1966–10–10	Alabama
G	31	Reggie Miller	6 ft 7 in (2.01 m)	185 lb (84 kg)	1965–08–24	UCLA
F	6	Terry Mills	6 ft 10 in (2.08 m)	230 lb (104 kg)	1967–12–21	Michigan
C	7	Jermaine O'Neal	6 ft 11 in (2.11 m)	260 lb (118 kg)	1978–10–13	Eau Claire HS (SC)
F	14	Sam Perkins	6 ft 9 in (2.06 m)	235 lb (107 kg)	1961–06–14	North Carolina
F	5	Jalen Rose	6 ft 8 in (2.03 m)	210 lb (95 kg)	1973–01–30	Michigan
C	40	Bruno Sundov	7 ft 2 in (2.18 m)	220 lb (100 kg)	1980–02–10	Croatia
C	55	Žan Tabak	7 ft 0 in (2.13 m)	245 lb (111 kg)	1970–06–15	Croatia

Coaches
Head coach
- Isiah Thomas
Assistant(s)
- Vern Fleming
- Brendan Malone
- Tree Rollins
- Jim Staak

Legend
- (DP) Unsigned draft pick
- (FA) Free agent
- (S) Suspended
- Injured

Roster
Updated: 2001–02–10

== Regular season ==
=== Season standings ===
Central Division	W	L	PCT	GB	Home	Road	Div
y-Milwaukee Bucks	52	30	.634	–	31–10	21–20	19–9
x-Toronto Raptors	47	35	.573	5	27–14	20–21	18–10
x-Charlotte Hornets	46	36	.561	6	28–13	18–23	20–8
x-Indiana Pacers	41	41	.500	11	26–15	15–26	15–13
e-Detroit Pistons	32	50	.390	20	18-23	14–27	16–12
e-Cleveland Cavaliers	30	52	.366	22	20–21	10–31	11–17
e-Atlanta Hawks	25	57	.305	27	18–23	7–34	9–19
e-Chicago Bulls	15	67	.183	37	10–31	5–36	4–24

Eastern Conference
#	Team	W	L	PCT	GB
1	c-Philadelphia 76ers	56	26	.683	–
2	y-Milwaukee Bucks	52	30	.634	4
3	x-Miami Heat	50	32	.610	6
4	x-New York Knicks	48	34	.585	8
5	x-Toronto Raptors	47	35	.573	9
6	x-Charlotte Hornets	46	36	.561	10
7	x-Orlando Magic	43	39	.524	13
8	x-Indiana Pacers	41	41	.500	15
9	e-Boston Celtics	36	46	.439	20
10	e-Detroit Pistons	32	50	.390	24
11	e-Cleveland Cavaliers	30	52	.366	26
12	e-New Jersey Nets	26	56	.317	30
13	e-Atlanta Hawks	25	57	.305	31
14	e-Washington Wizards	19	63	.232	37
15	e-Chicago Bulls	15	67	.183	42

== Game log ==
=== Regular season ===
2000–01 game log
Total: 41–41 (home: 26–15; road: 15–26)
October: 0–1 (home: 0–0; road: 0–1)

Game	Date	Team	Score	High points	High rebounds	High assists	Location Attendance	Record
1	October 31, 2000	@ San Antonio	L 85–98				Alamodome	0–1

November: 6–6 (home: 4–3; road: 2–3)

Game	Date	Team	Score	High points	High rebounds	High assists	Location Attendance	Record
2	November 2, 2000	@ Dallas	L 88–94				Reunion Arena	0–2
3	November 4, 2000	Chicago	W 94–81				Conseco Fieldhouse	1–2
4	November 8, 2000	Milwaukee	W 108–97				Conseco Fieldhouse	2–2
5	November 10, 2000	@ Washington	W 86–74				MCI Center	3–2
6	November 11, 2000	Detroit	W 94–84				Conseco Fieldhouse	4–2
7	November 15, 2000	@ Detroit	W 92–88				The Palace of Auburn Hills	5–2
8	November 17, 2000	Golden State	L 90–92				Conseco Fieldhouse	5–3
9	November 18, 2000	@ New Jersey	L 92–97				Continental Airlines Arena	5–4
10	November 21, 2000	Houston	L 89–101				Conseco Fieldhouse	5–5
11	November 23, 2000	Toronto	L 91–111				Conseco Fieldhouse	5–6
12	November 24, 2000	Washington	W 99–87				Conseco Fieldhouse	6–6
13	November 28, 2000	@ L.A. Lakers	L 107–124				Staples Center	6–7
14	November 30, 2000	@ Golden State	L 95–99				The Arena in Oakland	6–8

December: 7–10 (home: 4–4; road: 3–6)

Game	Date	Team	Score	High points	High rebounds	High assists	Location Attendance	Record
15	December 1, 2000	@ Vancouver	W 86–76 (OT)				General Motors Place	7–8
16	December 3, 2000	@ Milwaukee	L 80–92				Bradley Center	7–9
17	December 5, 2000	New Jersey	W 88–64				Conseco Fieldhouse	8–9
18	December 6, 2000	@ Charlotte	L 88–91				Charlotte Coliseum	8–10
19	December 8, 2000	@ Boston	W 104–91				FleetCenter	9–10
20	December 9, 2000	Charlotte	W 99–96 (OT)				Conseco Fieldhouse	10–10
21	December 12, 2000	@ Toronto	L 90–104				Air Canada Centre	10–11
22	December 13, 2000	Dallas	W 97–92				Conseco Fieldhouse	11–11
23	December 15, 2000	Cleveland	L 95–103				Conseco Fieldhouse	11–12
24	December 16, 2000	@ Minnesota	L 110–113 (OT)				Target Center	11–13
25	December 19, 2000	@ Chicago	W 90–85				United Center	12–13
26	December 20, 2000	Toronto	L 98–99 (OT)				Conseco Fieldhouse	12–14
27	December 22, 2000	Utah	L 101–109				Conseco Fieldhouse	12–15
28	December 23, 2000	@ Atlanta	L 87–91				Philips Arena	12–16
29	December 25, 2000	Orlando	W 103–93				Conseco Fieldhouse	13–16
30	December 27, 2000	@ Miami	L 79–91				American Airlines Arena	13–17
31	December 30, 2000	San Antonio	L 77–89				Conseco Fieldhouse	13–18

January: 7–7 (home: 3–3; road: 4–4)

Game	Date	Team	Score	High points	High rebounds	High assists	Location Attendance	Record
32	January 2, 2001	@ Seattle	W 91–83				KeyArena	14–18
33	January 3, 2001	@ Portland	L 86–102				Rose Garden	14–19
34	January 5, 2001	@ Sacramento	W 93–91 (OT)				ARCO Arena	15–19
35	January 8, 2001	@ L.A. Clippers	W 85–82				Staples Center	16–19
36	January 9, 2001	@ Utah	L 99–103				Delta Center	16–20
37	January 11, 2001	@ Phoenix	L 85–93				America West Arena	16–21
38	January 13, 2001	Miami	W 87–71				Conseco Fieldhouse	17–21
39	January 15, 2001	L.A. Clippers	W 89–74				Conseco Fieldhouse	18–21
40	January 18, 2001	Atlanta	W 84–76				Conseco Fieldhouse	19–21
41	January 21, 2001	@ New York	W 87–74				Madison Square Garden	20–21
42	January 25, 2001	Portland	L 82–92				Conseco Fieldhouse	20–22
43	January 28, 2001	Philadelphia	L 81–86				Conseco Fieldhouse	20–23
44	January 30, 2001	@ Orlando	L 86–93				Orlando Arena	20–24
45	January 31, 2001	Boston	L 96–102 (OT)				Conseco Fieldhouse	20–25

February: 7–3 (home: 5–1; road: 2–2)

Game	Date	Team	Score	High points	High rebounds	High assists	Location Attendance	Record
46	February 2, 2001	Denver	W 103–94				Conseco Fieldhouse	21–25
47	February 3, 2001	@ Milwaukee	L 85–104				Bradley Center	21–26
48	February 6, 2001	@ Miami	L 89–102				American Airlines Arena	21–27
All-Star Break
49	February 13, 2001	Charlotte	L 66–77				Conseco Fieldhouse	21–28
50	February 15, 2001	Detroit	W 82–73				Conseco Fieldhouse	22–28
51	February 18, 2001	L.A. Lakers	W 110–101				Conseco Fieldhouse	23–28
52	February 23, 2001	@ Cleveland	W 92–90				Gund Arena	24–28
53	February 25, 2001	Minnesota	W 110–100				Conseco Fieldhouse	25–28
54	February 26, 2001	@ Charlotte	L 72–82				Charlotte Coliseum	25–29
55	February 28, 2001	Milwaukee	W 99–86				Conseco Fieldhouse	26–29

March: 7–10 (home: 5–3; road: 2–7)

Game	Date	Team	Score	High points	High rebounds	High assists	Location Attendance	Record
56	March 2, 2001	Seattle	L 83–86				Conseco Fieldhouse	26–30
57	March 4, 2001	New Jersey	L 96–120				Conseco Fieldhouse	26–31
58	March 6, 2001	@ New York	L 83–97				Madison Square Garden	26–32
59	March 7, 2001	New York	L 75–79				Conseco Fieldhouse	26–33
60	March 9, 2001	Cleveland	W 99–84				Conseco Fieldhouse	27–33
61	March 11, 2001	@ Detroit	L 78–95				The Palace of Auburn Hills	27–34
62	March 13, 2001	@ Houston	L 118–127 (3OT)				Compaq Center	27–35
63	March 14, 2001	@ Denver	L 83–95				Pepsi Center	27–36
64	March 16, 2001	Atlanta	W 103–97				Conseco Fieldhouse	28–36
65	March 18, 2001	Sacramento	W 101–95				Conseco Fieldhouse	29–36
66	March 20, 2001	@ Toronto	L 81–102				Air Canada Centre	29–37
67	March 21, 2001	Orlando	W 96–95				Conseco Fieldhouse	30–37
68	March 23, 2001	Vancouver	W 95–75				Conseco Fieldhouse	31–37
69	March 25, 2001	@ Orlando	L 82–84				Orlando Arena	31–38
70	March 27, 2001	@ Washington	W 110–102				MCI Center	32–38
71	March 29, 2001	@ Atlanta	L 93–104				Philips Arena	32–39
72	March 30, 2001	@ Boston	W 92–87				FleetCenter	33–39

April: 8–2 (home: 5–1; road: 3–1)

Game	Date	Team	Score	High points	High rebounds	High assists	Location Attendance	Record
73	April 1, 2001	@ Philadelphia	L 93–104				First Union Center	33–40
74	April 3, 2001	Phoenix	W 85–81				Conseco Fieldhouse	34–40
75	April 6, 2001	Chicago	W 100–93				Conseco Fieldhouse	35–40
76	April 8, 2001	@ New Jersey	W 108–83				Continental Airlines Arena	36–40
77	April 9, 2001	Washington	W 100–78				Conseco Fieldhouse	37–40
78	April 11, 2001	New York	W 100–93				Conseco Fieldhouse	38–40
79	April 13, 2001	Boston	W 113–108 (OT)				Conseco Fieldhouse	39–40
80	April 15, 2001	@ Chicago	W 93–86				United Center	40–40
81	April 17, 2001	Philadelphia	L 105–111 (OT)				Conseco Fieldhouse	40–41
82	April 18, 2001	@ Cleveland	W 105–101 (OT)				Gund Arena	41–41

2000–01 schedule

== Playoffs ==
2001 playoff game log
First round: 1–3 (home: 0–2; road: 1–1)

Game	Date	Team	Score	High points	High rebounds	High assists	Location Attendance	Series
1	April 21, 2001	@ Philadelphia	W 79–78	Miller, Rose (17)	O'Neal (20)	Best (10)	First Union Center; 20,613	1–0
2	April 24, 2001	@ Philadelphia	L 98–116	Miller (41)	O'Neal (11)	Best (6)	First Union Center; 20,739	1–1
3	April 28, 2001	Philadelphia	L 87–92	Miller (35)	Best (11)	Best (9)	Conseco Fieldhouse; 18,345	1–2
4	May 2, 2001	Philadelphia	L 85–88	Miller (32)	O'Neal (14)	Best (12)	Conseco Fieldhouse; 18,345	1–3

2001 schedule

== Player statistics ==
=== Ragular season ===
Player	POS	GP	GS	MP	REB	AST	STL	BLK	PTS	MPG	RPG	APG	SPG	BPG	PPG
Reggie Miller	SG	81	81	3,181	285	260	81	15	1,527	39.3	3.5	3.2	1.0	.2	18.9
Jermaine O'Neal	C	81	80	2,641	794	98	49	228	1,041	32.6	9.8	1.2	.6	2.8	12.9
Austin Croshere	PF	81	23	1,874	387	92	36	50	822	23.1	4.8	1.1	.4	.6	10.1
Al Harrington	PF	78	38	1,892	381	130	63	18	586	24.3	4.9	1.7	.8	.2	7.5
Travis Best	PG	77	21	2,457	222	473	110	11	918	31.9	2.9	6.1	1.4	.1	11.9
Jalen Rose	SF	72	72	2,943	359	435	65	43	1,478	40.9	5.0	6.0	.9	.6	20.5
Jeff Foster	C	71	9	1,152	389	33	39	28	249	16.2	5.5	.5	.5	.4	3.5
Derrick McKey	SF	66	20	987	176	74	48	13	145	15.0	2.7	1.1	.7	.2	2.2
Sam Perkins	PF	64	41	999	168	41	33	18	242	15.6	2.6	.6	.5	.3	3.8
Jonathan Bender	SF	59	7	574	74	32	7	28	193	9.7	1.3	.5	.1	.5	3.3
Žan Tabak	C	55	14	777	213	33	10	30	216	14.1	3.9	.6	.2	.5	3.9
Tyus Edney	PG	24	0	263	24	54	17	0	106	11.0	1.0	2.3	.7	.0	4.4
Terry Mills	PF	14	0	113	21	5	3	1	25	8.1	1.5	.4	.2	.1	1.8
Bruno Šundov	C	11	4	120	23	2	2	4	43	10.9	2.1	.2	.2	.4	3.9
Lari Ketner	PF	3	0	7	0	1	0	0	0	2.3	.0	.3	.0	.0	.0

=== Playoffs ===
Player	POS	GP	GS	MP	REB	AST	STL	BLK	PTS	MPG	RPG	APG	SPG	BPG	PPG
Reggie Miller	SG	4	4	177	20	10	3	2	125	44.3	5.0	2.5	.8	.5	31.3
Jalen Rose	SF	4	4	164	18	11	6	1	72	41.0	4.5	2.8	1.5	.3	18.0
Travis Best	PG	4	4	163	19	37	4	0	39	40.8	4.8	9.3	1.0	.0	9.8
Jermaine O'Neal	C	4	4	157	50	7	0	10	39	39.3	12.5	1.8	.0	2.5	9.8
Jeff Foster	C	4	2	52	12	2	0	3	10	13.0	3.0	.5	.0	.8	2.5
Austin Croshere	PF	4	0	129	20	6	4	2	43	32.3	5.0	1.5	1.0	.5	10.8
Derrick McKey	SF	4	0	35	9	4	1	0	6	8.8	2.3	1.0	.3	.0	1.5
Al Harrington	PF	3	0	40	4	3	0	0	5	13.3	1.3	1.0	.0	.0	1.7
Sam Perkins	PF	3	0	19	4	0	0	0	5	6.3	1.3	.0	.0	.0	1.7
Žan Tabak	C	2	2	10	3	0	0	0	1	5.0	1.5	.0	.0	.0	.5
Tyus Edney	PG	2	0	10	0	3	1	0	4	5.0	.0	1.5	.5	.0	2.0
Jonathan Bender	SF	1	0	4	0	0	0	0	0	4.0	.0	.0	.0	.0	.0
