= 2000–01 Detroit Pistons season =

NBA team season

- Head coach: George Irvine
- President: Joe Dumars
- General manager: Joe Dumars
- Owner: William Davidson
- Arena: The Palace of Auburn Hills

Results
- Record: 32–50 (.390)
- Place: Division: 5th (Central); Conference: 10th (Eastern)
- Playoff finish: Did not qualify
- Stats at Basketball Reference

Local media
- Television: WKBD-TV
- Radio: WDFN

The 2000–01 Detroit Pistons season was the 53rd season for the Detroit Pistons in the National Basketball Association, their 60th season as a franchise, and their 44th season in Detroit, Michigan.

== Season summary ==
=== Off-season ===
The Pistons had the 14th overall pick in the 2000 NBA draft, and selected point guard Mateen Cleaves out of Michigan State University. During the off-season, retired All-Star guard and Pistons legend Joe Dumars was hired as General Manager. The team acquired Ben Wallace and second-year guard Chucky Atkins from the Orlando Magic, acquired Cedric Ceballos, Dana Barros and John Wallace from the Dallas Mavericks, and acquired Billy Owens from the Milwaukee Bucks.

=== Regular season ===
During the first month of the regular season, the Pistons signed free agent Joe Smith in November. With the addition of Smith, Atkins and Ben Wallace, the Pistons struggled losing four of their first five games of the regular season. In late November, the team traded Ceballos to the Miami Heat after 13 games. After a 13–15 start, the Pistons lost 13 of their next 15 games, and held a 19–31 record at the All-Star break. At mid-season, the team traded Jerome Williams, and Eric Montross to the Toronto Raptors in exchange for Corliss Williamson. The Pistons finished in fifth place in the Central Division with a disappointing 32–50 record.

Jerry Stackhouse averaged 29.8 points and 5.1 assists per game, and led the Pistons with 166 three-point field goals, despite only shooting .402 in field-goal percentage. In addition, Smith averaged 12.3 points and 7.1 rebounds per game, while Atkins contributed 12.0 points and 4.1 assists per game, along with 121 three-point field goals, and Ben Wallace provided the team with 6.4 points, 13.2 rebounds, 1.3 steals and 2.3 blocks per game. Off the bench, Barros contributed 8.0 points per game, while John Wallace averaged 5.9 points per game, Cleaves contributed 5.4 points and 2.7 assists per game, and starting small forward Michael Curry provided with 5.2 points per game.

During the NBA All-Star weekend at the MCI Center in Washington, D.C., Stackhouse was selected for the 2001 NBA All-Star Game, as a member of the Eastern Conference All-Star team; it was his second and final All-Star appearance. Meanwhile, Cleaves was selected for the NBA Rookie Challenge Game, as a member of the Rookies team. Stackhouse also finished in 14th place in Most Valuable Player voting, while Ben Wallace finished tied in fifth place in Defensive Player of the Year voting, and also tied in ninth place in Most Improved Player voting.

The Pistons finished 22nd in the NBA in home-game attendance, with an attendance of 607,323 at The Palace of Auburn Hills during the regular season.

=== Aftermath ===
Following the season, Smith re-signed with his former team, the Minnesota Timberwolves, while head coach George Irvine was fired, Cleaves was traded to the Sacramento Kings, John Wallace was traded along with Jud Buechler to the Phoenix Suns, and Owens retired.

== Draft picks ==
Round	Pick	Player	Position	Nationality	College
1	14	Mateen Cleaves	PG	United States	Michigan State
2	44	Brian Cardinal	SF	United States	Purdue

== Roster ==
2000–01 Detroit Pistons roster
Players

Pos.	No.	Player	Height	Weight	DOB	From
G	7	Chucky Atkins	5 ft 11 in (1.80 m)	160 lb (73 kg)	1974–08–14	South Florida
G	1	Dana Barros	5 ft 11 in (1.80 m)	163 lb (74 kg)	1967–04–13	Boston College
F	30	Jud Buechler	6 ft 6 in (1.98 m)	220 lb (100 kg)	1968–06–19	Arizona
F	35	Brian Cardinal	6 ft 8 in (2.03 m)	245 lb (111 kg)	1977–05–02	Purdue
G	24	Mateen Cleaves	6 ft 2 in (1.88 m)	205 lb (93 kg)	1977–09–07	Michigan State
G	12	Michael Curry	6 ft 5 in (1.96 m)	210 lb (95 kg)	1968–08–22	Georgia Southern
F	9	Kornél Dávid	6 ft 9 in (2.06 m)	235 lb (107 kg)	1971–10–22	Hungary
C	31	Mikki Moore	6 ft 11 in (2.11 m)	225 lb (102 kg)	1975–11–04	Nebraska
F	5	Billy Owens	6 ft 8 in (2.03 m)	220 lb (100 kg)	1969–05–01	Syracuse
F	32	Joe Smith	6 ft 10 in (2.08 m)	225 lb (102 kg)	1975–07–26	Maryland
G	42	Jerry Stackhouse	6 ft 6 in (1.98 m)	218 lb (99 kg)	1974–11–05	North Carolina
C	3	Ben Wallace	6 ft 9 in (2.06 m)	245 lb (111 kg)	1974–09–10	Virginia Union
F	44	John Wallace	6 ft 8 in (2.03 m)	225 lb (102 kg)	1974–02–09	Syracuse
F	34	Corliss Williamson	6 ft 7 in (2.01 m)	245 lb (111 kg)	1973–12–04	Arkansas

Coaches
Head coach
- George Irvine
Assistant(s)
- Mike Sanders
- Dave Twardzik
- Morris McHone
- Mike Abdenour (trainer)

Legend
- (DP) Unsigned draft pick
- (FA) Free agent
- (S) Suspended
- Injured

Roster
Updated: February 23, 2001

== Regular season ==
=== Season standings ===
Central Division	W	L	PCT	GB	Home	Road	Div
y-Milwaukee Bucks	52	30	.634	–	31–10	21–20	19–9
x-Toronto Raptors	47	35	.573	5	27–14	20–21	18–10
x-Charlotte Hornets	46	36	.561	6	28–13	18–23	20–8
x-Indiana Pacers	41	41	.500	11	26–15	15–26	15–13
e-Detroit Pistons	32	50	.390	20	18-23	14–27	16–12
e-Cleveland Cavaliers	30	52	.366	22	20–21	10–31	11–17
e-Atlanta Hawks	25	57	.305	27	18–23	7–34	9–19
e-Chicago Bulls	15	67	.183	37	10–31	5–36	4–24

Eastern Conference
#	Team	W	L	PCT	GB
1	c-Philadelphia 76ers	56	26	.683	–
2	y-Milwaukee Bucks	52	30	.634	4
3	x-Miami Heat	50	32	.610	6
4	x-New York Knicks	48	34	.585	8
5	x-Toronto Raptors	47	35	.573	9
6	x-Charlotte Hornets	46	36	.561	10
7	x-Orlando Magic	43	39	.524	13
8	x-Indiana Pacers	41	41	.500	15
9	e-Boston Celtics	36	46	.439	20
10	e-Detroit Pistons	32	50	.390	24
11	e-Cleveland Cavaliers	30	52	.366	26
12	e-New Jersey Nets	26	56	.317	30
13	e-Atlanta Hawks	25	57	.305	31
14	e-Washington Wizards	19	63	.232	37
15	e-Chicago Bulls	15	67	.183	42

z - clinched division title
y - clinched division title
x - clinched playoff spot

=== Game log ===
2000–01 game log
Total: 32-50 (Home: 18–23; Road: 14–27)
October: 1–0 (home: 0–0; road: 1–0)

Game	Date	Team	Score	High points	High rebounds	High assists	Location Attendance	Record
1	October 31	@ Toronto	W 104–95	Jerry Stackhouse (44)	Ben Wallace (12)	Chucky Atkins (7)	Air Canada Centre; 19,800	1–0

November: 5–9 (home: 3–4; road: 2–5)

Game	Date	Team	Score	High points	High rebounds	High assists	Location Attendance	Record
2	November 1	@ Boston	L 83–103	Jerry Stackhouse (20)	Jerome Williams (14)	Chucky Atkins (7)	FleetCenter; 17,725	1–1
3	November 3	Sacramento	L 93–100	Jerry Stackhouse (22)	Ben Wallace (10)	Chucky Atkins (7)	The Palace of Auburn Hills; 22,076	1–2
4	November 4	@ Milwaukee	L 88–97	Mateen Cleaves (19)	Ben Wallace (11)	Michael Curry (5)	Bradley Center; 18,717	1–3
5	November 8	@ Philadelphia	L 94–103	Jerry Stackhouse (36)	Eric Montross (8)	Chucky Atkins (7)	First Union Center; 15,986	1–4
6	November 9	@ New Jersey	W 108–94	Jerry Stackhouse (29)	Jerome Williams (12)	Atkins & Stackhouse (6)	Continental Airlines Arena; 10,000	2–4
7	November 11	@ Indiana	L 84–94	Chucky Atkins (18)	Jerome Williams (17)	Chucky Atkins (7)	Conseco Fieldhouse; 18,345	2–5
8	November 12	Seattle	W 101–92	Jerry Stackhouse (38)	Ben Wallace (12)	Chucky Atkins (11)	The Palace of Auburn Hills; 14,289	3–5
9	November 15	Indiana	L 88–92	Jerry Stackhouse (29)	Jerome Williams (11)	Mateen Cleaves (7)	The Palace of Auburn Hills; 14,350	3–6
10	November 17	@ Charlotte	W 96–89	Jerry Stackhouse (25)	Jerome Williams (12)	Jerry Stackhouse (5)	Charlotte Coliseum; 14,771	4–6
11	November 19	Charlotte	L 96–105	Jerry Stackhouse (22)	Ben Wallace (12)	Chucky Atkins (10)	The Palace of Auburn Hills; 13,088	4–7
12	November 21	@ Cleveland	L 98–117	Jerry Stackhouse (32)	Ben Wallace (13)	3 players tied (4)	Gund Arena; 12,683	4–8
13	November 24	Vancouver	W 118–96	Jerry Stackhouse (31)	Ben Wallace (9)	Wallace & Cleaves (6)	The Palace of Auburn Hills; 14,709	5–8
14	November 26	Utah	L 79–94	Jerry Stackhouse (37)	Ben Wallace (17)	Mateen Cleaves (5)	The Palace of Auburn Hills; 12,943	5–9
15	November 29	New Jersey	W 97–76	Jerry Stackhouse (31)	Ben Wallace (23)	Jerry Stackhouse (6)	The Palace of Auburn Hills; 11,497	6–9

December: 7–9 (home: 5–3; road: 2–6)

Game	Date	Team	Score	High points	High rebounds	High assists	Location Attendance	Record
16	December 1	Cleveland	W 103–93	Dana Barros (16)	Williams & Wallace (7)	Mateen Cleaves (6)	The Palace of Auburn Hills; 15,323	7–9
17	December 3	Washington	W 93–87	Jerry Stackhouse (24)	Ben Wallace (14)	Atkins & Stackhouse (5)	The Palace of Auburn Hills; 12,137	8–9
18	December 5	@ Vancouver	L 83–91	Chucky Atkins (13)	Ben Wallace (9)	Jerry Stackhouse (11)	General Motors Place; 12,578	8–10
19	December 6	@ Seattle	W 112–99	Jerry Stackhouse (41)	Ben Wallace (17)	Chucky Atkins (6)	KeyArena at Seattle Center; 14,795	9–10
20	December 9	@ Portland	L 83–114	Jerry Stackhouse (26)	Moore & Smith (5)	Mateen Cleaves (5)	Rose Garden Arena; 19,980	9–11
21	December 10	@ L.A. Lakers	L 88–112	Jerry Stackhouse (30)	Ben Wallace (13)	Mateen Cleaves (4)	STAPLES Center; 18,997	9–12
22	December 13	Atlanta	W 92–69	Jerry Stackhouse (30)	Wallace & Smith (11)	Mateen Cleaves (7)	The Palace of Auburn Hills; 11,252	10–12
23	December 15	Minnesota	L 90–99	Jerry Stackhouse (29)	Ben Wallace (14)	Jerry Stackhouse (5)	The Palace of Auburn Hills; 13,744	10–13
24	December 17	Dallas	L 90–99	Jerry Stackhouse (24)	Joe Smith (13)	Jerry Stackhouse (7)	The Palace of Auburn Hills; 11,389	10–14
25	December 19	@ Phoenix	W 89–84	Jerry Stackhouse (35)	Ben Wallace (14)	Stackhouse & Atkins (4)	America West Arena; 16,951	11–14
26	December 20	@ Denver	L 106–108	Jerry Stackhouse (30)	Ben Wallace (12)	Chucky Atkins (8)	Pepsi Center; 16,100	11–15
27	December 23	Chicago	W 106–93	Jerry Stackhouse (25)	Ben Wallace (12)	Jerry Stackhouse (8)	The Palace of Auburn Hills; 13,896	12–15
28	December 26	Boston	W 101–96	Jerry Stackhouse (33)	Ben Wallace (16)	Jerry Stackhouse (7)	The Palace of Auburn Hills; 14,568	13–15
29	December 28	@ Orlando	L 96–102	Jerry Stackhouse (34)	Ben Wallace (19)	Atkins & Cleaves (4)	TD Waterhouse Centre; 16,018	13–16
30	December 30	Miami	L 102–110 (OT)	Jerry Stackhouse (35)	Ben Wallace (21)	Jerry Stackhouse (7)	The Palace of Auburn Hills; 15,789	13–17
31	December 31	@ Washington	L 96–110	Jerry Stackhouse (25)	Ben Wallace (9)	Mateen Cleaves (4)	MCI Center; 13,132	13–18

January: 4–11 (home: 0–6; road: 4–5)

Game	Date	Team	Score	High points	High rebounds	High assists	Location Attendance	Record
32	January 3	@ Dallas	W 107–104	Jerry Stackhouse (33)	Joe Smith (15)	Jerry Stackhouse (8)	Reunion Arena; 12,789	14–18
33	January 4	@ Houston	L 97–107	Jerry Stackhouse (46)	Moore & B. Wallace (9)	Chucky Atkins (5)	Compaq Center; 11,646	14–19
34	January 6	@ San Antonio	L 101–108	Jerry Stackhouse (34)	Ben Wallace (15)	Jerry Stackhouse (6)	Alamodome; 20,333	14–20
35	January 10	Toronto	L 85–110	Jerry Stackhouse (23)	Ben Wallace (9)	Jerry Stackhouse (7)	The Palace of Auburn Hills; 17,249	14–21
36	January 12	San Antonio	L 90–111	Jerry Stackhouse (35)	Ben Wallace (9)	Jerry Stackhouse (5)	The Palace of Auburn Hills; 14,576	14–22
37	January 14	Portland	L 96–103	Jerry Stackhouse (41)	Ben Wallace (14)	Jerry Stackhouse (5)	The Palace of Auburn Hills; 16,798	14–23
38	January 16	@ Miami	L 85–93	Jerry Stackhouse (28)	Ben Wallace (14)	Mateen Cleaves (7)	American Airlines Arena; 16,011	14–24
39	January 18	@ Chicago	W 116–110	Jerry Stackhouse (36)	Ben Wallace (13)	Jerry Stackhouse (11)	United Center; 22,092	15–24
40	January 19	New York	L 91–97	Jerry Stackhouse (37)	Joe Smith (10)	Jerry Stackhouse (10)	The Palace of Auburn Hills; 16,728	15–25
41	January 21	Milwaukee	L 98–102	Dana Barros (22)	Ben Wallace (13)	Michael Curry (8)	The Palace of Auburn Hills; 13,357	15–26
42	January 24	Phoenix	L 73–106	Jerry Stackhouse (19)	Jerome Williams (9)	Jerry Stackhouse (3)	The Palace of Auburn Hills; 13,113	15–27
43	January 26	@ Philadelphia	L 89–105	Jerry Stackhouse (34)	Smith & B. Wallace (11)	Michael Curry (6)	First Union Center; 18,609	15–28
44	January 27	@ Milwaukee	W 108–103	Jerry Stackhouse (32)	Ben Wallace (13)	Jerry Stackhouse (7)	Bradley Center; 18,717	16–28
45	January 29	@ Boston	L 87–99	Chucky Atkins (20)	Ben Wallace (10)	Jerry Stackhouse (5)	FleetCenter; 13,537	16–29
46	January 31	@ New Jersey	W 112–103	Jerry Stackhouse (30)	Jerome Williams (17)	Jerry Stackhouse (10)	Continental Airlines Arena; 10,279	17–29

February: 4–7 (home: 3–5; road: 1–2)

Game	Date	Team	Score	High points	High rebounds	High assists	Location Attendance	Record
47	February 2	Boston	L 95–102	Jerry Stackhouse (40)	Jerome Williams (12)	Chucky Atkins (5)	The Palace of Auburn Hills; 15,340	17–30
48	February 3	@ Cleveland	W 88–81 (OT)	Joe Smith (22)	Ben Wallace (14)	Jerry Stackhouse (5)	Gund Arena; 19,635	18–30
49	February 6	Denver	W 94–83	Jerry Stackhouse (24)	Jerome Williams (12)	Jerry Stackhouse (6)	The Palace of Auburn Hills; 11,378	19–30
50	February 8	Houston	L 90–103	Jerry Stackhouse (26)	Mikki Moore (12)	Mateen Cleaves (3)	The Palace of Auburn Hills; 12,678	19–31
All-Star Break
51	February 14	New Jersey	W 105–86	Jerry Stackhouse (30)	Williams & B. Wallace (13)	Chucky Atkins (7)	The Palace of Auburn Hills; 11,387	20–31
52	February 15	@ Indiana	L 73–82	Jerry Stackhouse (40)	Jerome Williams (13)	Chucky Atkins (4)	Conseco Fieldhouse; 18,345	20–32
53	February 19	L.A. Clippers	L 106–111 (OT)	Jerry Stackhouse (28)	Joe Smith (13)	Chucky Atkins (8)	The Palace of Auburn Hills; 11,858	20–33
54	February 21	New York	W 90–85	Jerry Stackhouse (32)	Ben Wallace (10)	Jerry Stackhouse (8)	The Palace of Auburn Hills; 15,129	21–33
55	February 23	Philadelphia	L 78–99	Jerry Stackhouse (22)	Ben Wallace (17)	Barros & Stackhouse (4)	The Palace of Auburn Hills; 22,076	21–34
56	February 25	Cleveland	L 94–101	Jerry Stackhouse (35)	Ben Wallace (10)	Stackhouse & Atkins (6)	The Palace of Auburn Hills; 12,144	21–35
57	February 28	@ Minnesota	L 100–111	Jerry Stackhouse (28)	Ben Wallace (10)	Jerry Stackhouse (7)	Target Center; 16,273	21–36

March: 5–10 (home: 4–3; road: 1–7)

Game	Date	Team	Score	High points	High rebounds	High assists	Location Attendance	Record
58	March 2	Miami	L 93–97 (OT)	Chucky Atkins (36)	Ben Wallace (20)	Jerry Stackhouse (8)	The Palace of Auburn Hills; 15,454	21–37
59	March 4	Orlando	W 93–84	Jerry Stackhouse (26)	Ben Wallace (22)	Jerry Stackhouse (7)	The Palace of Auburn Hills; 14,380	22–37
60	March 5	@ Miami	L 84–87	Jerry Stackhouse (32)	Ben Wallace (14)	Jerry Stackhouse (5)	American Airlines Arena; 15,812	22–38
61	March 7	@ Orlando	L 102–112	Jerry Stackhouse (36)	Ben Wallace (12)	Jerry Stackhouse (7)	TD Waterhouse Centre; 13,791	22–39
62	March 9	Chicago	W 108–75	Jerry Stackhouse (23)	Ben Wallace (15)	Mateen Cleaves (8)	The Palace of Auburn Hills; 16,765	23–39
63	March 11	Indiana	W 95–78	Jerry Stackhouse (30)	Ben Wallace (17)	Jerry Stackhouse (5)	The Palace of Auburn Hills; 13,926	24–39
64	March 14	@ Washington	L 96–103	Jerry Stackhouse (38)	Ben Wallace (13)	Chucky Atkins (8)	MCI Center; 13,822	24–40
65	March 15	L.A. Lakers	L 119–125 (OT)	Jerry Stackhouse (46)	Ben Wallace (15)	Jerry Stackhouse (4)	The Palace of Auburn Hills; 22,076	24–41
66	March 17	@ Atlanta	W 106–90	Jerry Stackhouse (31)	Ben Wallace (10)	Mateen Cleaves (6)	Philips Arena; 14,453	25–41
67	March 18	Milwaukee	L 96–100	Ben Wallace (18)	Ben Wallace (21)	Stackhouse & Atkins (5)	The Palace of Auburn Hills; 12,953	25–42
68	March 20	@ Utah	L 79–84	Jerry Stackhouse (29)	Joe Smith (12)	Chucky Atkins (5)	Delta Center; 18,890	25–43
69	March 22	@ Sacramento	L 98–103	Jerry Stackhouse (31)	Ben Wallace (19)	Jerry Stackhouse (5)	ARCO Arena; 17,317	25–44
70	March 24	@ Golden State	L 95–103	Jerry Stackhouse (28)	Corliss Williamson (12)	Cleaves & Atkins (6)	The Arena in Oakland; 14,832	25–45
71	March 27	@ L.A. Clippers	L 94–101	Jerry Stackhouse (21)	Billy Owens (14)	Cleaves & Atkins (5)	STAPLES Center; 13,262	25–46
72	March 30	Orlando	W 100–97	Jerry Stackhouse (33)	Ben Wallace (21)	Mateen Cleaves (6)	The Palace of Auburn Hills; 18,161	26–46

April: 6–4 (home: 3–2; road: 3–2)

Game	Date	Team	Score	High points	High rebounds	High assists	Location Attendance	Record
73	April 1	Golden State	W 104–87	Jerry Stackhouse (32)	Ben Wallace (16)	Jerry Stackhouse (6)	The Palace of Auburn Hills; 12,237	27–46
74	April 3	@ Chicago	W 110–83	Jerry Stackhouse (57)	Ben Wallace (20)	Mateen Cleaves (9)	United Center; 21,749	28–46
75	April 4	Philadelphia	L 84–90	Dana Barros (16)	Ben Wallace (15)	Jerry Stackhouse (4)	The Palace of Auburn Hills; 16,485	28–47
76	April 7	@ Charlotte	W 97–92	Jerry Stackhouse (30)	Ben Wallace (24)	Jerry Stackhouse (6)	Charlotte Coliseum; 16,655	29–47
77	April 9	Atlanta	W 81–69	Jerry Stackhouse (28)	Ben Wallace (16)	Jerry Stackhouse (11)	The Palace of Auburn Hills; 14,557	30–47
78	April 11	Toronto	W 99–87	Jerry Stackhouse (35)	Ben Wallace (23)	Chucky Atkins (7)	The Palace of Auburn Hills; 18,790	31–47
79	April 14	@ Atlanta	W 129–124 (OT)	Jerry Stackhouse (37)	Ben Wallace (15)	Chucky Atkins (7)	Philips Arena; 17,295	32–47
80	April 15	Charlotte	L 90–99	Jerry Stackhouse (34)	Ben Wallace (13)	Chucky Atkins (7)	The Palace of Auburn Hills; 16,678	32–48
81	April 17	@ Toronto	L 92–94 (OT)	Jerry Stackhouse (22)	Ben Wallace (28)	Jerry Stackhouse (7)	Air Canada Centre; 19,800	32–49
82	April 18	@ New York	L 88–94	Jerry Stackhouse (22)	Williamson & B. Wallace (9)	Jerry Stackhouse (6)	Madison Square Garden; 19,763	32–50

2000–01 schedule

== Player statistics ==
Legend
GP	Games played	GS	Games started	MPG	Minutes per game
FG%	Field-goal percentage	3P%	3-point field-goal percentage	FT%	Free-throw percentage
RPG	Rebounds per game	APG	Assists per game	SPG	Steals per game
BPG	Blocks per game	PPG	Points per game

Player	GP	GS	MPG	FG%	3P%	FT%	RPG	APG	SPG	BPG	PPG
Chucky Atkins	81	75	29.2	.399	.357	.692	2.1	4.1	0.8	0.1	12.0
Dana Barros	60	0	18.0	.444	.419	.850	1.6	1.8	0.5	0.0	8.0
Jud Buechler	57	3	12.9	.463	.416	.750	1.6	0.7	0.4	0.2	3.4
Brian Cardinal	15	0	8.4	.323	.000	.611	1.5	0.2	0.5	0.1	2.1
Cedric Ceballos	13	0	12.8	.394	.275	.800	2.0	0.5	0.5	0.2	5.8
Mateen Cleaves	78	8	16.3	.400	.294	.708	1.7	2.7	0.6	0.0	5.4
Michael Curry	68	58	21.8	.455	.444	.849	1.8	1.9	0.4	0.0	5.2
Kornel David	10	0	6.9	.455	n/a	n/a	1.9	0.3	0.4	0.1	2.0
Eric Montross	42	20	13.5	.413	n/a	.269	3.4	0.4	0.2	0.5	2.5
Mikki Moore	81	2	14.2	.493	.000	.731	3.9	0.4	0.3	0.8	4.4
Billy Owens	45	14	17.6	.383	.150	.475	4.6	1.2	0.7	0.3	4.4
Joe Smith	69	59	28.1	.403	.000	.805	7.1	1.1	0.7	0.7	12.3
Jerry Stackhouse	80	80	40.2	.402	.351	.822	3.9	5.1	1.2	0.7	29.8
Ben Wallace	80	80	34.5	.490	.250	.336	13.2	1.5	1.3	2.3	6.4
John Wallace	40	0	13.2	.424	.133	.778	2.1	0.6	0.3	0.4	5.9
Jerome Williams	33	2	24.4	.438	.000	.722	8.4	1.0	1.2	0.3	7.3
Corliss Williamson	27	9	29.6	.534	n/a	.626	6.2	1.0	1.3	0.3	15.2

Player statistics citation:

== See also ==
- 2000-01 NBA season
