= 2000–01 NBA season =

55th NBA season

- League: National Basketball Association
- Sport: Basketball
- Duration: October 31, 2000 – April 18, 2001; April 21 – June 3, 2001 (Playoffs); June 6 – 15, 2001 (Finals)
- Teams: 29
- TV partner(s): NBC, TBS, TNT

Draft
- Top draft pick: Kenyon Martin
- Picked by: New Jersey Nets

Regular season
- Top seed: San Antonio Spurs
- Season MVP: Allen Iverson (Philadelphia)
- Top scorer: Allen Iverson (Philadelphia)

Playoffs
- Eastern champions: Philadelphia 76ers
- Eastern runners-up: Milwaukee Bucks
- Western champions: Los Angeles Lakers
- Western runners-up: San Antonio Spurs

Finals
- Champions: Los Angeles Lakers
- Runners-up: Philadelphia 76ers
- Finals MVP: Shaquille O'Neal (L.A. Lakers)

NBA seasons
- ← 1999–2000 2001–02 →

The 2000–01 NBA season was the 55th season of the National Basketball Association. The season ended with the Los Angeles Lakers winning their second straight championship, beating the Philadelphia 76ers 4 games to 1 in the 2001 NBA Finals.

== Notable occurrences ==
Coaching changes
Offseason
Team	1999–2000 coach	2000–01 coach
Atlanta Hawks	Lenny Wilkens	Lon Kruger
Golden State Warriors	Garry St. Jean	Dave Cowens
Indiana Pacers	Larry Bird	Isiah Thomas
Los Angeles Clippers	Jim Todd	Alvin Gentry
New Jersey Nets	Don Casey	Byron Scott
Toronto Raptors	Butch Carter	Lenny Wilkens
Vancouver Grizzlies	Lionel Hollins	Sidney Lowe
Washington Wizards	Darrell Walker	Leonard Hamilton
In-season
Team	Outgoing coach	Incoming coach
Boston Celtics	Rick Pitino	Jim O'Brien
Seattle SuperSonics	Paul Westphal	Nate McMillan

- The NBA All-Star Game was held at the MCI Center in Washington, D.C.. The East won 111–110, with Philadelphia's Allen Iverson being named the game's Most Valuable Player. The game is noted for the Eastern Conference's 21-point comeback in the fourth quarter.
- The Grizzlies play their final season in Vancouver, British Columbia before relocating to Memphis, Tennessee for the following season leaving the Toronto Raptors as the only Canadian team left in the NBA.
- Rick Pitino resigned as head coach and president of the Boston Celtics, ending a three-plus-year tenure filled with turmoil, disappointment and three consecutive below .500, non-playoff seasons.
- The Dallas Mavericks played their final season at Reunion Arena. They also made the playoffs for the first time since the 1989–90 season. They also made it past the first round for the first time since the 1987–88 season.
- The Los Angeles Lakers win their second straight title by going 15–1 in the playoffs, then the best playoff winning percentage in NBA history (later surpassed by the 2017 Golden State Warriors).
- The Toronto Raptors advanced to the second round of the NBA playoffs for the first time in franchise history, defeating the New York Knicks three games to two. The Raptors would eventually lose in the second round to the Philadelphia 76ers four games to three.
- Prior to the season, Miami Heat center Alonzo Mourning announced that he suffered a kidney disorder and missed the first five months of the season. Mourning would receive a kidney transplant two years later.
- This was the last time a team with the best regular season record did not win 60 or more games in a full 82-game season until 2023. The San Antonio Spurs finished with the league's best record at 58–24. Though the 2011–12 Chicago Bulls and the 2011–12 San Antonio Spurs each won 50 games and the top conference seeds, they did so during a 66-game lockout-shortened regular season.
- Effective of this season, the league now permitted players to wear knee-length shorts by default, although players like John Stockton opted to continue wearing short shorts during the season. This would be the case for other players in the future as players like Chris Douglas-Roberts in the 2014–15 season and LeBron James for some of the 2015–16 season would opt to wear short shorts.
- Three teams in the Western Conference who missed the playoffs won 40 or more games. The ninth-placed Houston Rockets finished the season with a 45–37 record, the tenth-placed Seattle SuperSonics finished with a 44–38 record, and the eleventh-placed Denver Nuggets ended the season with a 40–42 record.

== 2000–01 NBA changes ==
- The Los Angeles Clippers changed their uniforms, added side panels to their jerseys and shorts.
- The New Jersey Nets slightly changed their alternate uniforms.
- The Orlando Magic changed their logo.
- The Philadelphia 76ers slightly changed their uniforms.
- The Phoenix Suns changed their logo and uniforms, added side panels to their jerseys and shorts, adding grey to their color scheme.
- The Vancouver Grizzlies changed their home uniforms, while the alternate uniforms became their primary road jersey.

== Standings ==
=== By division ===
Eastern Conference

Atlantic Division	W	L	PCT	GB	Home	Road	Div
y-Philadelphia 76ers	56	26	.683	–	29–12	27–14	18–6
x-Miami Heat	50	32	.610	6	29–12	21–20	15–10
x-New York Knicks	48	34	.585	8	30–11	18–23	16–9
x-Orlando Magic	43	39	.524	13	26–15	17–24	14–10
e-Boston Celtics	36	46	.439	20	20–21	16–25	11–13
e-New Jersey Nets	26	56	.317	30	18–23	8–33	8–16
e-Washington Wizards	19	63	.232	37	12–29	7–34	3–21

Central Division	W	L	PCT	GB	Home	Road	Div
y-Milwaukee Bucks	52	30	.634	–	31–10	21–20	19–9
x-Toronto Raptors	47	35	.573	5	27–14	20–21	18–10
x-Charlotte Hornets	46	36	.561	6	28–13	18–23	20–8
x-Indiana Pacers	41	41	.500	11	26–15	15–26	15–13
e-Detroit Pistons	32	50	.390	20	18-23	14–27	16–12
e-Cleveland Cavaliers	30	52	.366	22	20–21	10–31	11–17
e-Atlanta Hawks	25	57	.305	27	18–23	7–34	9–19
e-Chicago Bulls	15	67	.183	37	10–31	5–36	4–24

Western Conference

Midwest Division	W	L	PCT	GB	Home	Road	Div
z-San Antonio Spurs	58	24	.707	–	33–8	25–16	19–5
x-Utah Jazz	53	29	.646	5	28–13	25–16	14–10
x-Dallas Mavericks	53	29	.646	5	28–13	25–16	14–10
x-Minnesota Timberwolves	47	35	.573	11	30–11	17–24	11–13
e-Houston Rockets	45	37	.549	13	24–17	21–20	11–13
e-Denver Nuggets	40	42	.488	18	29–12	11–30	13–11
e-Vancouver Grizzlies	23	59	.280	35	15–26	8–33	2–22

Pacific Division	W	L	PCT	GB	Home	Road	Div
y-Los Angeles Lakers	56	26	.683	–	31–10	25–16	14–10
x-Sacramento Kings	55	27	.671	1	33–8	22–19	16–8
x-Phoenix Suns	51	31	.622	5	31–10	20–21	12–12
x-Portland Trail Blazers	50	32	.610	6	28–13	22–19	12–12
e-Seattle SuperSonics	44	38	.537	12	26–15	18–23	17–7
e-Los Angeles Clippers	31	51	378	25	22–19	9–32	9–15
e-Golden State Warriors	17	65	.207	39	11–30	6–35	4–20

=== By conference ===
Eastern Conference
#	Team	W	L	PCT	GB
1	c-Philadelphia 76ers	56	26	.683	–
2	y-Milwaukee Bucks	52	30	.634	4
3	x-Miami Heat	50	32	.610	6
4	x-New York Knicks	48	34	.585	8
5	x-Toronto Raptors	47	35	.573	9
6	x-Charlotte Hornets	46	36	.561	10
7	x-Orlando Magic	43	39	.524	13
8	x-Indiana Pacers	41	41	.500	15
9	e-Boston Celtics	36	46	.439	20
10	e-Detroit Pistons	32	50	.390	24
11	e-Cleveland Cavaliers	30	52	.366	26
12	e-New Jersey Nets	26	56	.317	30
13	e-Atlanta Hawks	25	57	.305	31
14	e-Washington Wizards	19	63	.232	37
15	e-Chicago Bulls	15	67	.183	42

Western Conference
#	Team	W	L	PCT	GB
1	z-San Antonio Spurs	58	24	.707	–
2	y-Los Angeles Lakers	56	26	.683	2
3	x-Sacramento Kings	55	27	.671	3
4	x-Utah Jazz	53	29	.646	5
5	x-Dallas Mavericks	53	29	.646	5
6	x-Phoenix Suns	51	31	.622	7
7	x-Portland Trail Blazers	50	32	.610	8
8	x-Minnesota Timberwolves	47	35	.573	11
9	e-Houston Rockets	45	37	.549	13
10	e-Seattle SuperSonics	44	38	.537	14
11	e-Denver Nuggets	40	42	.488	18
12	e-Los Angeles Clippers	31	51	.378	27
13	e-Vancouver Grizzlies	23	59	.280	35
14	e-Golden State Warriors	17	65	.207	41

Notes

- z – Clinched home court advantage for the entire playoffs
- c – Clinched home court advantage for the conference playoffs
- y – Clinched division title
- x – Clinched playoff spot
- e – Eliminated from playoff contention

== Playoffs ==
Teams in bold advanced to the next round. The numbers to the left of each team indicate the team's seeding in its conference, and the numbers to the right indicate the number of games the team won in that round. The division champions are marked by an asterisk. Home-court advantage does not necessarily belong to the higher-seeded team, but instead the team with the better regular season record; teams enjoying the home advantage are shown in italics.

First Round	Conference Semifinals
**E1**	**Philadelphia***	**3**
E8	Indiana	1
**E1**	**Philadelphia***	**4**
E5	Toronto	3
E4	New York	2
**E5**	**Toronto**	**3**
**Eastern Conference**
E3	Miami	0
**E6**	**Charlotte**	**3**
E6	Charlotte	3
**E2**	**Milwaukee***	**4**
**E2**	**Milwaukee***	**3**
E7	Orlando	1
**W1**	**San Antonio***	**3**
W8	Minnesota	1
**W1**	**San Antonio***	**4**
W5	Dallas	1
W4	Utah	2
**W5**	**Dallas**	**3**
**Western Conference**
**W3**	**Sacramento**	**3**
W6	Phoenix	1
W3	Sacramento	0
**W2**	**LA Lakers***	**4**
**W2**	**LA Lakers***	**3**
W7	Portland	0

Conference Finals
**E1**	**Philadelphia***	**4**
E2	Milwaukee*	3
W1	San Antonio	0
**W2**	**LA Lakers***	**4**

NBA Finals
E1	Philadelphia*	1
**W2**	**LA Lakers***	**4**

- * Division winner
- **Bold** Series winner
- Italic Team with home-court advantage

== Statistics leaders ==
Category	Player	Team	Stat
Points per game	Allen Iverson	Philadelphia 76ers	31.1
Rebounds per game	Dikembe Mutombo	Atlanta Hawks; Philadelphia 76ers	13.5
Assists per game	Jason Kidd	Phoenix Suns	9.8
Steals per game	Allen Iverson	Philadelphia 76ers	2.51
Blocks per game	Theo Ratliff	Philadelphia 76ers	3.74
FG%	Shaquille O'Neal	Los Angeles Lakers	.572
FT%	Reggie Miller	Indiana Pacers	.928
3FG%	Brent Barry	Seattle SuperSonics	.472

== Awards ==
=== Yearly awards ===
- Most Valuable Player: Allen Iverson, Philadelphia 76ers
- Rookie of the Year: Mike Miller, Orlando Magic
- Defensive Player of the Year: Dikembe Mutombo, Philadelphia 76ers/Atlanta Hawks
- Sixth Man of the Year: Aaron McKie, Philadelphia 76ers
- Most Improved Player: Tracy McGrady, Orlando Magic
- Coach of the Year: Larry Brown, Philadelphia 76ers
- Executive of the Year: Geoff Petrie, Sacramento Kings
- Sportsmanship Award: David Robinson, San Antonio Spurs

- All-NBA First Team:
  - F – Tim Duncan, San Antonio Spurs
  - F – Chris Webber, Sacramento Kings
  - C – Shaquille O'Neal, Los Angeles Lakers
  - G – Allen Iverson, Philadelphia 76ers
  - G – Jason Kidd, Phoenix Suns
- All-NBA Second Team:
  - F – Kevin Garnett, Minnesota Timberwolves
  - F – Vince Carter, Toronto Raptors
  - C – Dikembe Mutombo, Philadelphia 76ers
  - G – Kobe Bryant, Los Angeles Lakers
  - G – Tracy McGrady, Orlando Magic
- All-NBA Third Team:
  - F – Karl Malone, Utah Jazz
  - F – Dirk Nowitzki, Dallas Mavericks
  - C – David Robinson, San Antonio Spurs
  - G – Gary Payton, Seattle SuperSonics
  - G – Ray Allen, Milwaukee Bucks

- NBA All-Defensive First Team:
  - Tim Duncan, San Antonio Spurs
  - Kevin Garnett, Minnesota Timberwolves
  - Dikembe Mutombo, Philadelphia 76ers
  - Gary Payton, Seattle SuperSonics
  - Jason Kidd, Phoenix Suns
- All-Defensive Second Team:
  - Bruce Bowen, Miami Heat
  - P. J. Brown, Charlotte Hornets
  - Shaquille O'Neal, Los Angeles Lakers
  - Kobe Bryant, Los Angeles Lakers
  - Doug Christie, Sacramento Kings

- NBA All-Rookie First Team:
  - Mike Miller, Orlando Magic
  - Kenyon Martin, New Jersey Nets
  - Marc Jackson, Golden State Warriors
  - Morris Peterson, Toronto Raptors
  - Darius Miles, Los Angeles Clippers
- All-Rookie Second Team:
  - Hedo Türkoğlu, Sacramento Kings
  - Desmond Mason, Seattle SuperSonics
  - Courtney Alexander, Washington Wizards
  - Marcus Fizer, Chicago Bulls
  - Chris Mihm, Cleveland Cavaliers

=== Players of the month ===
The following players were named the Players of the Month.

Month	Player
October – November	Karl Malone (Utah Jazz)
December	Kobe Bryant (Los Angeles Lakers)
January	Allen Iverson (Philadelphia 76ers)
February	Tracy McGrady (Orlando Magic)
March	Paul Pierce (Boston Celtics)
April	Shaquille O'Neal (Los Angeles Lakers)

=== Rookies of the month ===
The following players were named the Rookies of the Month.

Month	Player
October – November	Kenyon Martin (New Jersey Nets)
December	Marc Jackson (Golden State Warriors)
January	Marc Jackson (Golden State Warriors)
February	Mike Miller (Orlando Magic)
March	Kenyon Martin (New Jersey Nets); Mike Miller (Orlando Magic)
April	Courtney Alexander (Washington Wizards)

=== Coaches of the month ===
The following coaches were named Coaches of the Month.

Month	Coach
October – November	Larry Brown (Philadelphia 76ers)
December	Pat Riley (Miami Heat)
January	Flip Saunders (Minnesota Timberwolves)
February	Jerry Sloan (Utah Jazz)
March	Gregg Popovich (San Antonio Spurs)
April	Isiah Thomas (Indiana Pacers)

== See also ==
- List of NBA regular season records
