= 2000–01 Orlando Magic season =

NBA professional basketball team season

- Head coach: Doc Rivers
- General manager: John Gabriel
- Owners: RDV Sports, Inc.
- Arena: TD Waterhouse Centre

Results
- Record: 43–39 (.524)
- Place: Division: 4th (Atlantic); Conference: 7th (Eastern)
- Playoff finish: First round (lost to Bucks 1–3)
- Stats at Basketball Reference

Local media
- Television: Sunshine Network; WBRW

The 2000–01 Orlando Magic season was the 12th season for the Orlando Magic in the National Basketball Association.

== Season summary ==
=== Off-season ===
The Magic received the fifth overall pick in the 2000 NBA draft, and selected shooting guard Mike Miller from the University of Florida; the team also selected point guard Keyon Dooling from the University of Missouri with the tenth overall pick, and selected shooting guard Courtney Alexander out of Fresno State University with the 13th overall pick. However, the Magic soon traded Dooling to the Los Angeles Clippers, and traded Alexander to the Dallas Mavericks on draft day.

During the off-season, the Magic acquired Tracy McGrady from the Toronto Raptors, and acquired All-Star forward Grant Hill from the Detroit Pistons. The Magic had nearly signed then-free agent All-Star forward Tim Duncan, offering him a six-year contract worth $67.5 million; Duncan led the San Antonio Spurs to their first championship title the year before. However, Duncan would re-sign with the Spurs. Additionally, the Magic also signed free agents Troy Hudson, Dee Brown and Don Reid, and acquired Andrew DeClercq from the Cleveland Cavaliers.

For the season, the Magic redesigned their primary logo, which featured the team name "Magic" in blue letters surrounded by silver and black outlines, along with sliver stars with white outlines as the letter "A", and on top of the letter "I" in "Magic". Above the team name featured the city name "Orlando" in black letters, featuring a white star with a black outline as the letter "A". Underneath the team name featured a silver and blue shooting basketball with black seams, surrounded by a silver outline along with two white stars, and one silver star. The team also slightly redesigned their white home uniforms and blue road uniforms, adding their new alternate logo of a shooting basketball on the right leg of their shorts, and adding the team name on the back of their waistband.

The team's new primary logo would remain in use until 2010, while the slightly redesigned uniforms would last until 2003.

=== Regular season ===
However, despite the addition of McGrady, Hill and Miller, Hill re-injured his left ankle from the previous season after only playing just four games, and was out for the remainder of the regular season, as the Magic struggled losing 11 of their first 16 games in November. Meanwhile, Brown only appeared in just seven games due to a left quadricep tendon injury. Despite losing both Hill and Brown, the Magic posted a nine-game winning streak between January and February, held a 25–23 record at the All-Star break, and returned to the NBA playoffs after a one-year absence, finishing in fourth place in the Atlantic Division with a 43–39 record, and earning the seventh seed in the Eastern Conference.

McGrady averaged 26.8 points, 7.5 rebounds, 4.6 assists, 1.5 steals and 1.5 blocks per game, and was named the NBA Most Improved Player of the Year, and was also named to the All-NBA Second Team. In addition, Hill averaged 13.8 points, and 6.3 rebounds and assists per game each during his short four-game stint, while Darrell Armstrong provided the team with 15.9 points, 7.0 assists and 1.8 steals per game, along with 143 three-point field goals, Miller contributed 11.9 points per game, led the Magic with 148 three-point field goals, and was named the NBA Rookie of the Year, and was also named to the NBA All-Rookie First Team, and Bo Outlaw averaged 7.3 points, 7.7 rebounds, 1.3 steals and 1.7 blocks per game. Off the bench, Pat Garrity contributed 8.3 points per game, while John Amaechi provided with 7.9 points per game, and Michael Doleac averaged 6.4 points and 3.5 rebounds per game.

During the NBA All-Star weekend at the MCI Center in Washington, D.C., McGrady and Hill were both selected for the 2001 NBA All-Star Game, as members of the Eastern Conference All-Star team, although Hill did not participate due to his ankle injury; it was McGrady's first ever All-Star appearance. In addition, McGrady also participated in the NBA 2Ball Competition, along with Nykesha Sales of the WNBA's Orlando Miracle, while Miller was selected for the NBA Rookie Challenge Game, as a member of the Rookies team, and Garrity participated in the NBA Three-Point Shootout. McGrady also finished in sixth place in Most Valuable Player voting.

The Magic finished 23rd in the NBA in home-game attendance, with an attendance of 605,031 at the TD Waterhouse Centre during the regular season.

=== NBA playoffs ===
In the Eastern Conference First Round of the 2001 NBA playoffs, the Magic faced off against the 2nd–seeded, and Central Division champion Milwaukee Bucks, who were led by the trio of All-Star guard Ray Allen, All-Star forward Glenn Robinson, and Sam Cassell. The Magic lost the first two games to the Bucks on the road at the Bradley Center, but managed to win Game 3 at home in overtime, 121–116 at the TD Waterhouse Centre, in which McGrady posted a double-double of 42 points and 10 assists. However, the Magic lost Game 4 to the Bucks at home, 112–104, thus losing the series in four games.

=== Aftermath ===
Following the season, Amaechi signed as a free agent with the Utah Jazz, and Doleac was traded to the Cleveland Cavaliers on draft day.

== Draft picks ==
Round	Pick	Player	Position	Nationality	College
1	5	Mike Miller	SF/SG	United States	Florida
1	10	Keyon Dooling	PG	United States	Missouri
1	13	Courtney Alexander	SG	United States	Fresno State

== Roster ==
2000–01 Orlando Magic roster
Players

Pos.	No.	Player	Height	Weight	DOB	From
G	2	Cory Alexander	6 ft 1 in (1.85 m)	185 lb (84 kg)	1973–06–22	Virginia
C	13	John Amaechi	6 ft 10 in (2.08 m)	270 lb (122 kg)	1970–11–26	Penn State
G	10	Darrell Armstrong	6 ft 0 in (1.83 m)	170 lb (77 kg)	1968–06–22	Fayetteville State
G	7	Dee Brown	6 ft 1 in (1.85 m)	160 lb (73 kg)	1968–11–29	Jacksonville
C	55	Andrew DeClercq	6 ft 10 in (2.08 m)	230 lb (104 kg)	1973–02–01	Florida
C	51	Michael Doleac	6 ft 11 in (2.11 m)	262 lb (119 kg)	1977–06–15	Utah
F	8	Pat Garrity	6 ft 9 in (2.06 m)	238 lb (108 kg)	1976–08–23	Notre Dame
F	33	Grant Hill	6 ft 8 in (2.03 m)	225 lb (102 kg)	1972–10–05	Duke
G	11	Troy Hudson	6 ft 1 in (1.85 m)	170 lb (77 kg)	1976–03–13	Southern Illinois
G	1	Tracy McGrady	6 ft 8 in (2.03 m)	210 lb (95 kg)	1979–05–24	Mt. Zion HS (NC)
F	50	Mike Miller	6 ft 8 in (2.03 m)	210 lb (95 kg)	1980–02–19	Florida
F	45	Bo Outlaw	6 ft 8 in (2.03 m)	210 lb (95 kg)	1971–04–13	Houston
F	52	Don Reid	6 ft 8 in (2.03 m)	250 lb (113 kg)	1973–12–30	Georgetown
F	3	Monty Williams	6 ft 8 in (2.03 m)	225 lb (102 kg)	1971–10–08	Notre Dame

Coaches
Head coach
- Doc Rivers
Assistant(s)
- Johnny Davis
- Paul Pressey
- Tom Sterner
- Dave Wohl

Legend
- (DP) Unsigned draft pick
- (FA) Free agent
- (S) Suspended
- Injured

Roster
Updated: January 29, 2001

=== Roster notes ===
- Small forward Grant Hill played 4 games (his last game being on December 12, 2000), but missed the rest of the season and the playoffs due to having season-ending surgery on his left ankle, which involved removing a metal plate and five screws from the inside portion of Hill's ankle, and replacing the plate with a bone graft from his pelvis, then inserting new screws.

== Regular season ==
=== Season standings ===
Atlantic Division	W	L	PCT	GB	Home	Road	Div
y-Philadelphia 76ers	56	26	.683	–	29–12	27–14	18–6
x-Miami Heat	50	32	.610	6	29–12	21–20	15–10
x-New York Knicks	48	34	.585	8	30–11	18–23	16–9
x-Orlando Magic	43	39	.524	13	26–15	17–24	14–10
e-Boston Celtics	36	46	.439	20	20–21	16–25	11–13
e-New Jersey Nets	26	56	.317	30	18–23	8–33	8–16
e-Washington Wizards	19	63	.232	37	12–29	7–34	3–21

Eastern Conference
#	Team	W	L	PCT	GB
1	c-Philadelphia 76ers	56	26	.683	–
2	y-Milwaukee Bucks	52	30	.634	4
3	x-Miami Heat	50	32	.610	6
4	x-New York Knicks	48	34	.585	8
5	x-Toronto Raptors	47	35	.573	9
6	x-Charlotte Hornets	46	36	.561	10
7	x-Orlando Magic	43	39	.524	13
8	x-Indiana Pacers	41	41	.500	15
9	e-Boston Celtics	36	46	.439	20
10	e-Detroit Pistons	32	50	.390	24
11	e-Cleveland Cavaliers	30	52	.366	26
12	e-New Jersey Nets	26	56	.317	30
13	e-Atlanta Hawks	25	57	.305	31
14	e-Washington Wizards	19	63	.232	37
15	e-Chicago Bulls	15	67	.183	42

z – clinched division title
y – clinched division title
x – clinched playoff spot

== Playoffs ==
2001 playoff game log
First round: 1–3 (home: 1–1; road: 0–2)

Game	Date	Team	Score	High points	High rebounds	High assists	Location Attendance	Series
1	April 22	@ Milwaukee	L 90–103	Tracy McGrady (33)	McGrady, Outlaw (9)	Tracy McGrady (8)	Bradley Center; 18,717	0–1
2	April 25	@ Milwaukee	L 96–103	Tracy McGrady (35)	Doleac, Outlaw (7)	Tracy McGrady (7)	Bradley Center; 18,717	0–2
3	April 28	Milwaukee	W 121–116 (OT)	Tracy McGrady (42)	Bo Outlaw (14)	Tracy McGrady (10)	TD Waterhouse Centre; 17,248	1–2
4	May 1	Milwaukee	L 104–112	Tracy McGrady (25)	Bo Outlaw (12)	Armstrong, McGrady (8)	TD Waterhouse Centre; 17,248	1–3

2001 schedule

== Player statistics ==
=== Regular season ===
Player	POS	GP	GS	MP	REB	AST	STL	BLK	PTS	MPG	RPG	APG	SPG	BPG	PPG
Mike Miller	SF	82	62	2,390	327	140	51	19	975	29.1	4.0	1.7	.6	.2	11.9
John Amaechi	C	82	36	1,710	268	74	28	29	650	20.9	3.3	.9	.3	.4	7.9
Monty Williams	SF	82	0	1,211	243	79	29	16	410	14.8	3.0	1.0	.4	.2	5.0
Bo Outlaw	PF	80	69	2,534	619	225	105	137	582	31.7	7.7	2.8	1.3	1.7	7.3
Tracy McGrady	SG	77	77	3,087	580	352	116	118	2,065	40.1	7.5	4.6	1.5	1.5	26.8
Michael Doleac	C	77	21	1,398	273	65	37	41	490	18.2	3.5	.8	.5	.5	6.4
Pat Garrity	SF	76	1	1,579	210	51	40	15	628	20.8	2.8	.7	.5	.2	8.3
Darrell Armstrong	PG	75	75	2,767	343	524	135	13	1,189	36.9	4.6	7.0	1.8	.2	15.9
Troy Hudson	PG	75	7	1,008	105	162	37	3	357	13.4	1.4	2.2	.5	.0	4.8
Andrew DeClercq	C	67	51	903	236	32	41	33	261	13.5	3.5	.5	.6	.5	3.9
Don Reid	PF	65	7	764	242	21	23	54	210	11.8	3.7	.3	.4	.8	3.2
Cory Alexander	PG	26	0	227	25	36	16	0	52	8.7	1.0	1.4	.6	.0	2.0
Dee Brown	PG	7	0	155	11	12	4	0	48	22.1	1.6	1.7	.6	.0	6.9
James Robinson	PG	6	0	50	8	0	4	1	10	8.3	1.3	.0	.7	.2	1.7
Elliot Perry^{†}	PG	6	0	39	4	5	3	0	10	6.5	.7	.8	.5	.0	1.7
Grant Hill	SF	4	4	133	25	25	5	2	55	33.3	6.3	6.3	1.3	.5	13.8

- ^{†} Denotes player spent time with another team in the season. Stats reflect time with the Magic only.

=== Playoffs ===
Player	POS	GP	GS	MP	REB	AST	STL	BLK	PTS	MPG	RPG	APG	SPG	BPG	PPG
Tracy McGrady	SG	4	4	178	26	33	7	5	135	44.5	6.5	8.3	1.8	1.3	33.8
Darrell Armstrong	PG	4	4	167	22	19	8	2	53	41.8	5.5	4.8	2.0	.5	13.3
Bo Outlaw	PF	4	4	134	42	9	5	6	34	33.5	10.5	2.3	1.3	1.5	8.5
Mike Miller	SF	4	4	112	18	7	0	3	48	28.0	4.5	1.8	.0	.8	12.0
Andrew DeClercq	C	4	4	54	16	1	2	2	20	13.5	4.0	.3	.5	.5	5.0
Pat Garrity	SF	4	0	117	5	2	0	1	48	29.3	1.3	.5	.0	.3	12.0
Troy Hudson	PG	4	0	56	9	9	1	0	17	14.0	2.3	2.3	.3	.0	4.3
Michael Doleac	C	4	0	45	14	1	3	0	12	11.3	3.5	.3	.8	.0	3.0
John Amaechi	C	4	0	29	3	3	3	2	9	7.3	.8	.8	.8	.5	2.3
Dee Brown	PG	3	0	54	3	4	2	0	18	18.0	1.0	1.3	.7	.0	6.0
Don Reid	PF	3	0	25	11	0	1	2	10	8.3	3.7	.0	.3	.7	3.3
Monty Williams	SF	3	0	14	6	0	0	2	7	4.7	2.0	.0	.0	.7	2.3

== Awards and honors ==
- Tracy McGrady – Most Improved Player, All-NBA 2nd Team, All-Star
- Mike Miller – Rookie of the Year, All-Rookie 1st Team
- Grant Hill – All-Star
