= 2000–01 Toronto Raptors season =

NBA professional basketball team season

- Head coach: Lenny Wilkens
- General manager: Glen Grunwald
- Owners: Maple Leaf Sports & Entertainment
- Arena: Air Canada Centre

Results
- Record: 47–35 (.573)
- Place: Division: 2nd (Central); Conference: 5th (Eastern)
- Playoff finish: Conference semifinals (lost to 76ers 3–4)
- Stats at Basketball Reference

Local media
- Television: CTV Sportsnet; TSN; The Score; CTV
- Radio: CJCL

The 2000–01 Toronto Raptors season was the sixth season for the Toronto Raptors in the National Basketball Association. Key departures before the season included former head coach Butch Carter, Tracy McGrady, Doug Christie, and Dee Brown.

== Season summary ==
=== Off-season ===
The Raptors had the 21st overall pick in the 2000 NBA draft, and selected small forward Morris Peterson out of Michigan State University. During the off-season, the team acquired Corliss Williamson from the Sacramento Kings, and signed free agent Mark Jackson. Basketball Hall of Fame member Lenny Wilkens became the fourth head coach in the team's franchise history.

=== Regular season ===
Under Wilkens and with the addition of Peterson, the Raptors lost their first three games of the regular season, but played above .500 in winning percentage as the season progressed, holding a 26–23 record at the All-Star break. At mid-season, the team traded Williamson to the Detroit Pistons in exchange for Jerome Williams and Eric Montross, while Jackson was traded along with Muggsy Bogues back to his former team, the New York Knicks in exchange for Chris Childs, and Kevin Willis was dealt to the Denver Nuggets in exchange for Keon Clark and Tracy Murray in two other separate mid-season trades. The Raptors won 11 of their final 14 games of the season, finishing in second place in the Central Division with a 47–35 record, earning the fifth seed in the Eastern Conference, and qualifying for their second NBA playoff appearance.

Vince Carter averaged 27.6 points, 5.5 rebounds, 3.9 assists and 1.5 steals per game, led the Raptors with 162 three-point field goals, and was named to the All-NBA Second Team, while Antonio Davis averaged 13.7 points, 10.1 rebounds and 1.9 blocks per game. In addition, Alvin Williams provided the team with 9.8 points, 5.0 assists and 1.5 steals per game, while Charles Oakley averaged 9.6 points and 9.5 rebounds per game, and Peterson contributed 9.3 points per game, and was named to the NBA All-Rookie First Team. Meanwhile, Clark averaged 9.0 points, 5.4 rebounds and 2.4 blocks per game in 46 games after the trade, three-point specialist Dell Curry contributed 6.0 points per game, Jerome Williams averaged 5.0 points and 4.0 rebounds per game in 26 games, and Childs provided with 4.5 points and 4.6 assists per game in 26 games.

During the NBA All-Star weekend at the MCI Center in Washington, D.C., Carter and Davis were both selected for the 2001 NBA All-Star Game, as members of the Eastern Conference All-Star team; it was Davis's first and only All-Star appearance. Meanwhile, Peterson was selected for the NBA Rookie Challenge Game, as a member of the Rookies team. Carter also finished tied in eleventh place in Most Valuable Player voting, while Williams finished tied in ninth place in Most Improved Player voting, and Peterson finished tied in fourth place in Rookie of the Year voting.

The Raptors finished sixth in the NBA in home-game attendance, with an attendance of 793,256 at the Air Canada Centre during the regular season.

=== NBA playoffs ===
In the Eastern Conference First Round of the 2001 NBA playoffs, and for the second consecutive year, the Raptors faced off against the 4th–seeded Knicks, a team that featured All-Star guard Allan Houston, All-Star forward Latrell Sprewell, and former Raptors center Marcus Camby. With the series tied at 1–1, the Raptors lost Game 3 to the Knicks at home, 97–89 at the Air Canada Centre, as the Knicks took a 2–1 series lead. However, the Raptors managed to win the next two games, which included a Game 5 win over the Knicks on the road, 93–89 at Madison Square Garden to win in a hard-fought five-game series; it was the first time that the Raptors won an NBA playoff series in franchise history.

In their first appearance in the Eastern Conference Semi-finals, the team faced off against the top–seeded, and Atlantic Division champion Philadelphia 76ers, who were led by All-Star guard, and Most Valuable Player of the Year, Allen Iverson, All-Star center and Defensive Player of the Year, Dikembe Mutombo, and Sixth Man of the Year, Aaron McKie. With the series tied at 1–1, the Raptors won Game 3 over the 76ers at the Air Canada Centre, 102–78 to take a 2–1 series lead; in Game 3, Carter scored 50 points and made 9 out of 13 three-point field-goal attempts. The Raptors lost the next two games, including a Game 5 loss to the 76ers on the road, 121–88 at the First Union Center, but managed to win Game 6 at the Air Canada Centre, 101–89 to even the series. However, the Raptors lost Game 7 to the 76ers at the First Union Center, 88–87, thus losing in a hard-fought seven-game series.

The 76ers would advance to the 2001 NBA Finals, but would lose to the defending NBA champion Los Angeles Lakers in five games.

=== Aftermath ===
Following the season, Oakley was traded back to his former team, the Chicago Bulls. The Raptors would not win another NBA playoff series until the 2015–16 season.

== NBA draft ==
Round	Pick	Player	Position	Nationality	College
1	21	Morris Peterson	Guard/Forward	United States	Michigan State
2	46	DeeAndre Hulett	Guard	United States	College of the Sequoias

== Roster ==
2000–01 Toronto Raptors roster
Players

Pos.	No.	Player	Height	Weight	DOB	From
SF	15	Vince Carter	6 ft 6 in (1.98 m)	220 lb (100 kg)	1977–01–26	North Carolina
PG	1	Chris Childs	6 ft 3 in (1.91 m)	195 lb (88 kg)	1967–11–20	Boise State
PF	7	Keon Clark	6 ft 11 in (2.11 m)	220 lb (100 kg)	1975–04–16	UNLV
SG	30	Dell Curry	6 ft 4 in (1.93 m)	190 lb (86 kg)	1964–06–25	Virginia Tech
C	33	Antonio Davis	6 ft 9 in (2.06 m)	215 lb (98 kg)	1968–10–31	UTEP
C	00	Eric Montross	7 ft 0 in (2.13 m)	270 lb (122 kg)	1971–09–23	North Carolina
SF	3	Tracy Murray	6 ft 7 in (2.01 m)	225 lb (102 kg)	1971–07–25	UCLA
C	32	Mamadou N'Diaye	7 ft 0 in (2.13 m)	255 lb (116 kg)	1975–06–16	Auburn
PF	34	Charles Oakley	6 ft 8 in (2.03 m)	225 lb (102 kg)	1963–12–18	Virginia Union
SG	24	Morris Peterson	6 ft 7 in (2.01 m)	220 lb (100 kg)	1977–08–26	Michigan State
C	4	Michael Stewart	6 ft 10 in (2.08 m)	230 lb (104 kg)	1975–04–25	California
SG	20	Alvin Williams	6 ft 5 in (1.96 m)	185 lb (84 kg)	1974–08–06	Villanova
PF	13	Jerome Williams	6 ft 9 in (2.06 m)	206 lb (93 kg)	1973–05–10	Georgetown

Coaches
Head coach
- Lenny Wilkens
Assistant(s)
- Stan Albeck
- Jim Brewer
- Brian James
- Craig Neal

Legend
- (DP) Unsigned draft pick
- (FA) Free agent
- (S) Suspended
- Injured

Roster
Updated: February 22, 2001

== Game log ==
=== Preseason ===
2000 preseason game log
Total: 4–4 (home: 1–3; road: 2–0; Neutral: 1–1)
October

Game	Date	Team	Score	Location Attendance	Record
1	October 10	Minnesota	96–100	Air Canada Centre; 12,744	0–1
2	October 12	Vancouver (at Ottawa)	97–92	Corel Centre; 14,783	1–1
3	October 14	@ Cleveland	113–108 (OT)	Gund Arena; 9,480	2–1
4	October 16	Philadelphia (at Chapel Hill, North Carolina)	98–107	Dean Smith Center; 5,588	2–2
5	October 18	Dallas	94–99	Air Canada Centre; 13,229	2–3
6	October 21	Charlotte	66–91	Air Canada Centre; 13,647	2–4
7	October 23	Indiana	91–80	Air Canada Centre; 12,893	3–4
8	October 25	@ Charlotte	94–88	Charlotte Coliseum; 12,173	4–4

All times are EASTERN time

=== Regular season standings ===
Central Division	W	L	PCT	GB	Home	Road	Div
y-Milwaukee Bucks	52	30	.634	–	31–10	21–20	19–9
x-Toronto Raptors	47	35	.573	5	27–14	20–21	18–10
x-Charlotte Hornets	46	36	.561	6	28–13	18–23	20–8
x-Indiana Pacers	41	41	.500	11	26–15	15–26	15–13
e-Detroit Pistons	32	50	.390	20	18-23	14–27	16–12
e-Cleveland Cavaliers	30	52	.366	22	20–21	10–31	11–17
e-Atlanta Hawks	25	57	.305	27	18–23	7–34	9–19
e-Chicago Bulls	15	67	.183	37	10–31	5–36	4–24

Eastern Conference
#	Team	W	L	PCT	GB
1	c-Philadelphia 76ers	56	26	.683	–
2	y-Milwaukee Bucks	52	30	.634	4
3	x-Miami Heat	50	32	.610	6
4	x-New York Knicks	48	34	.585	8
5	x-Toronto Raptors	47	35	.573	9
6	x-Charlotte Hornets	46	36	.561	10
7	x-Orlando Magic	43	39	.524	13
8	x-Indiana Pacers	41	41	.500	15
9	e-Boston Celtics	36	46	.439	20
10	e-Detroit Pistons	32	50	.390	24
11	e-Cleveland Cavaliers	30	52	.366	26
12	e-New Jersey Nets	26	56	.317	30
13	e-Atlanta Hawks	25	57	.305	31
14	e-Washington Wizards	19	63	.232	37
15	e-Chicago Bulls	15	67	.183	42

=== Regular season ===
2000–01 game log
October: 0–1 (home: 0–1; road: 0–0)

Game	Date	Team	Score	High points	High rebounds	High assists	Location Attendance	Record
1	October 31	Detroit	L 95–104	Vince Carter (26)	Antonio Davis, Charles Oakley, Kevin Willis (10)	Mark Jackson (12)	Air Canada Centre; 19,800	0–1

November: 8–6 (home: 5–2; road: 3–4)

Game	Date	Team	Score	High points	High rebounds	High assists	Location Attendance	Record
2	November 1	@ Philadelphia	L 98–104	Vince Carter (25)	Antonio Davis (11)	Mark Jackson (12)	First Union Center; 19,817	0–2
3	November 3	@ Boston	L 91–93	Vince Carter (33)	Antonio Davis (10)	Mark Jackson (12)	FleetCenter; 17,464	0–3
4	November 4	Washington	W 103–96	Vince Carter (34)	Kevin Willis (9)	Mark Jackson (12)	Air Canada Centre; 18,726	1–3
5	November 7	Boston	W 105–75	Antonio Davis (24)	Charles Oakley (11)	Mark Jackson (15)	Air Canada Centre; 17,379	2–3
6	November 10	Cleveland	W 115–88	Vince Carter (32)	Charles Oakley (11)	Charles Oakley (7)	Air Canada Centre; 19,800	3–3
7	November 11	@ Chicago	W 98–75	Vince Carter (26)	Antonio Davis (12)	Charles Oakley (12)	United Center; 22,387	4–3
8	November 16	Portland	L 80–86	Vince Carter (37)	Antonio Davis (12)	Mark Jackson (7)	Air Canada Centre; 19,800	4–4
9	November 18	Milwaukee	W 111–102	Vince Carter (48)	Antonio Davis (18)	Mark Jackson (12)	Air Canada Centre; 19,800	5–4
10	November 20	Charlotte	L 64–100	Vince Carter (20)	Antonio Davis (12)	Mark Jackson (7)	Air Canada Centre; 17,767	5–5
11	November 23	@ Indiana	W 111–91	Vince Carter (28)	Antonio Davis (10)	Mark Jackson (8)	Conseco Fieldhouse; 18,345	6–5
12	November 25	@ New York	W 79–75	Vince Carter (25)	Antonio Davis (18)	Mark Jackson (8)	Madison Square Garden; 19,763	7–5
13	November 26	Chicago	W 101–89	Antonio Davis, Morris Peterson (18)	Mark Jackson, Charles Oakley (11)	Mark Jackson (11)	Air Canada Centre; 19,800	8–5
14	November 28	@ Dallas	L 93–107	Corliss Williamson (22)	Charles Oakley (14)	Mark Jackson (9)	Reunion Arena; 16,016	8–6
15	November 29	@ Charlotte	L 79–103	Antonio Davis (15)	Antonio Davis (12)	Mark Jackson (7)	Charlotte Coliseum; 12,255	8–7

December: 7–8 (home: 4–3; road: 3–5)

Game	Date	Team	Score	High points	High rebounds	High assists	Location Attendance	Record
16	December 1	L.A. Clippers	W 104–95 (OT)	Mark Jackson (20)	Antonio Davis (13)	Mark Jackson (15)	Air Canada Centre; 18,470	9–7
17	December 5	@ Utah	L 84–98	Kevin Willis (20)	Antonio Davis (12)	Alvin Williams (5)	Delta Center; 19,288	9–8
18	December 6	@ Portland	L 88–95	Antonio Davis (18)	Kevin Willis (16)	Mark Jackson (12)	Rose Garden; 19,980	9–9
19	December 8	@ Golden State	W 108–92	Vince Carter (29)	Kevin Willis (13)	Mark Jackson (9)	The Arena in Oakland; 18,316	10–9
20	December 10	Phoenix	L 87–95	Vince Carter (35)	Charles Oakley (16)	Mark Jackson (9)	Air Canada Centre; 19,800	10–10
21	December 12	Indiana	W 104–90	Vince Carter (33)	Charles Oakley (10)	Mark Jackson (11)	Air Canada Centre; 18,221	11–10
22	December 14	New York	W 70–68	Vince Carter (24)	Charles Oakley (11)	Mark Jackson (7)	Air Canada Centre; 19,800	12–10
23	December 15	@ Milwaukee	L 97–104	Antonio Davis (25)	Antonio Davis (12)	Mark Jackson (8)	Bradley Center; 16,432	12–11
24	December 17	L.A. Lakers	L 101–104 (OT)	Vince Carter (31)	Charles Oakley (18)	Alvin Williams (7)	Air Canada Centre; 19,800	12–12
25	December 19	Utah	W 103–95	Vince Carter (33)	Charles Oakley (15)	Alvin Williams (8)	Air Canada Centre; 18,896	13–12
26	December 20	@ Indiana	W 99–98 (OT)	Vince Carter (45)	Antonio Davis (19)	Mark Jackson (9)	Conseco Fieldhouse; 18,345	14–12
27	December 22	Atlanta	L 72–78	Vince Carter (20)	Charles Oakley (16)	Vince Carter (10)	Air Canada Centre; 18,962	14–13
28	December 26	@ Minnesota	L 97–100	Vince Carter (32)	Charles Oakley (14)	Vince Carter (11)	Target Center; 16,828	14–14
29	December 28	@ Denver	W 94–93	Vince Carter (25)	Antonio Davis (14)	Mark Jackson (17)	Pepsi Center; 17,700	15–14
30	December 30	@ Phoenix	L 103–109	Vince Carter (46)	Charles Oakley, Corliss Williamson (9)	Vince Carter (6)	America West Arena; 19,023	15–15

January: 9–7 (home: 4–2; road: 5–5)

Game	Date	Team	Score	High points	High rebounds	High assists	Location Attendance	Record
31	January 2	@ L.A. Clippers	L 97–110	Vince Carter (25)	Charles Oakley (11)	Mark Jackson (8)	Staples Center; 18,037	15–16
32	January 5	Dallas	L 105–115	Vince Carter (33)	Charles Oakley, Kevin Willis (10)	Mark Jackson (8)	Air Canada Centre; 19,800	15–17
33	January 7	Seattle	W 94–92	Vince Carter (23)	Kevin Willis (13)	Mark Jackson (10)	Air Canada Centre; 19,800	16–17
34	January 9	Houston	L 91–110	Vince Carter (24)	Kevin Willis (13)	Mark Jackson (7)	Air Canada Centre; 19,106	16–18
35	January 10	@ Detroit	W 110–85	Charles Oakley (19)	Antonio Davis (11)	Mark Jackson (12)	The Palace of Auburn Hills; 17,249	17–18
36	January 12	@ Boston	W 93–72	Vince Carter (25)	Antonio Davis (12)	Mark Jackson, Alvin Williams (7)	FleetCenter; 17,775	18–18
37	January 14	Charlotte	W 107–99	Vince Carter (40)	Charles Oakley (10)	Mark Jackson (14)	Air Canada Centre; 19,800	19–18
38	January 16	@ Houston	L 99–114	Vince Carter (22)	Antonio Davis (9)	Mark Jackson (7)	Compaq Center; 13,195	19–19
39	January 17	@ San Antonio	W 98–91	Vince Carter (27)	Charles Oakley (12)	Mark Jackson (10)	Alamodome; 17,044	20–19
40	January 19	Washington	W 101–79	Vince Carter (25)	Charles Oakley (10)	Vince Carter (7)	Air Canada Centre; 19,800	21–19
41	January 21	@ Philadelphia	W 110–106 (OT)	Vince Carter (39)	Charles Oakley (14)	Mark Jackson (13)	First Union Center; 20,583	22–19
42	January 23	@ Orlando	L 111–116 (2OT)	Vince Carter (33)	Charles Oakley (13)	Vince Carter (7)	TD Waterhouse Centre; 16,131	22–20
43	January 24	@ Miami	L 83–103	Vince Carter (21)	Keon Clark, Antonio Davis (9)	Mark Jackson (6)	American Airlines Arena; 16,500	22–21
44	January 27	@ Chicago	W 90–80	Antonio Davis, Alvin Williams (15)	Charles Oakley (14)	Mark Jackson (12)	United Center; 22,497	23–21
45	January 30	Philadelphia	W 96–89	Morris Peterson (22)	Charles Oakley (12)	Mark Jackson, Alvin Williams (6)	Air Canada Centre; 19,800	24–21
46	January 31	@ Atlanta	L 97–102	Morris Peterson (20)	Antonio Davis (15)	Mark Jackson (12)	Philips Arena; 12,799	24–22

February: 7–5 (home: 4–4; road: 3–1)

Game	Date	Team	Score	High points	High rebounds	High assists	Location Attendance	Record
47	February 3	Minnesota	L 105–108	Antonio Davis (25)	Antonio Davis (13)	Mark Jackson (10)	Air Canada Centre; 19,800	24–23
48	February 5	Boston	W 110–98	Vince Carter (29)	Antonio Davis, Charles Oakley (12)	Mark Jackson (8)	Air Canada Centre; 18,521	25–23
49	February 8	Denver	W 99–92	Vince Carter (31)	Antonio Davis (12)	Alvin Williams (9)	Air Canada Centre; 18,041	26–23
50	February 13	@ Cleveland	W 120–105	Vince Carter (33)	Antonio Davis (13)	Mark Jackson (16)	Gund Arena; 15,079	27–23
51	February 15	Miami	L 91–98 (OT)	Vince Carter (28)	Charles Oakley (15)	Mark Jackson (9)	Air Canada Centre; 19,800	27–24
52	February 18	San Antonio	L 74–92	Morris Peterson (14)	Antonio Davis (8)	Mark Jackson (9)	Air Canada Centre; 19,800	27–25
53	February 20	Golden State	W 113–102	Vince Carter (33)	Vince Carter (13)	Mark Jackson (12)	Air Canada Centre; 18,119	28–25
54	February 21	@ New Jersey	L 111–113	Vince Carter (39)	Antonio Davis (10)	Mark Jackson (7)	Continental Airlines Arena; 15,475	28–26
55	February 23	Sacramento	L 118–119 (3OT)	Vince Carter (38)	Antonio Davis, Charles Oakley (12)	Alvin Williams (13)	Air Canada Centre; 19,800	28–27
56	February 24	@ Washington	W 106–99	Vince Carter (19)	Tracy Murray, Charles Oakley, Morris Peterson (7)	Chris Childs, Alvin Williams (8)	MCI Center; 20,674	29–27
57	February 27	Cleveland	W 101–89	Vince Carter (32)	Charles Oakley (13)	Alvin Williams (7)	Air Canada Centre; 17,202	30–27
58	February 28	@ Atlanta	W 95–88	Vince Carter (32)	Antonio Davis (15)	Alvin Williams (9)	Philips Arena; 14,159	31–27

March: 9–5 (home: 6–1; road: 3–4)

Game	Date	Team	Score	High points	High rebounds	High assists	Location Attendance	Record
59	March 2	New Jersey	W 107–90	Vince Carter (38)	Charles Oakley (14)	Charles Oakley (8)	Air Canada Centre; 19,800	32–27
60	March 4	New York	W 98–88	Vince Carter (25)	Antonio Davis (9)	Alvin Williams (7)	Air Canada Centre; 19,800	33–27
61	March 6	@ Sacramento	L 91–98	Vince Carter, Antonio Davis (25)	Vince Carter, Antonio Davis (9)	Alvin Williams (4)	ARCO Arena; 17,317	33–28
62	March 7	@ L.A. Lakers	L 85–97	Vince Carter (28)	Charles Oakley (10)	Charles Oakley (6)	Staples Center; 18,997	33–29
63	March 9	@ Seattle	W 110–99	Vince Carter (32)	Charles Oakley (12)	Alvin Williams (8)	KeyArena; 17,072	34–29
64	March 11	@ Vancouver	W 101–84	Vince Carter (25)	Vince Carter (8)	Charles Oakley (6)	General Motors Place; 19,193	35–29
65	March 13	Milwaukee	L 97–101	Vince Carter (24)	Keon Clark (10)	Chris Childs (8)	Air Canada Centre; 19,800	35–30
66	March 15	@ New York	L 72–88	Vince Carter (22)	Jerome Williams (9)	Chris Childs (8)	Madison Square Garden; 19,763	35–31
67	March 20	Indiana	W 102–81	Vince Carter (33)	Charles Oakley (9)	Chris Childs, Alvin Williams (7)	Air Canada Centre; 19,800	36–31
68	March 21	@ Charlotte	L 95–111	Vince Carter (23)	Keon Clark, Antonio Davis (6)	Alvin Williams (9)	Charlotte Coliseum; 15,746	36–32
69	March 23	Atlanta	W 112–86	Vince Carter (29)	Alvin Williams (10)	Alvin Williams (14)	Air Canada Centre; 19,554	37–32
70	March 25	Vancouver	W 102–92	Vince Carter (24)	Antonio Davis (14)	Alvin Williams (8)	Air Canada Centre; 19,800	38–32
71	March 27	@ Miami	W 101–92	Vince Carter (38)	Charles Oakley (14)	Alvin Williams (11)	American Airlines Arena; 18,221	39–32
72	March 30	New Jersey	W 110–99	Vince Carter (27)	Antonio Davis (11)	Alvin Williams (8)	Air Canada Centre; 19,217	40–32

April: 7–3 (home: 4–1; road: 3–2)

Game	Date	Team	Score	High points	High rebounds	High assists	Location Attendance	Record
73	April 1	Orlando	L 101–104	Vince Carter (28)	Charles Oakley (9)	Vince Carter (11)	Air Canada Centre; 19,971	40–33
74	April 3	Philadelphia	W 100–85	Vince Carter (26)	Eric Montross (11)	Alvin Williams (13)	Air Canada Centre; 19,800	41–33
75	April 4	@ Cleveland	W 97–94	Vince Carter (32)	Charles Oakley (12)	Alvin Williams (10)	Gund Arena; 15,414	42–33
76	April 6	@ Orlando	W 108–100	Antonio Davis (31)	Antonio Davis (13)	Vince Carter (8)	TD Waterhouse Centre; 17,248	43–33
77	April 8	Chicago	W 100–88	Vince Carter (33)	Antonio Davis (14)	Vince Carter, Alvin Williams (6)	Air Canada Centre; 19,800	44–33
78	April 11	@ Detroit	L 87–99	Vince Carter (22)	Antonio Davis (13)	Alvin Williams (11)	The Palace of Auburn Hills; 18,790	44–34
79	April 13	Miami	W 94–82	Vince Carter (27)	Antonio Davis (13)	Vince Carter (8)	Air Canada Centre; 20,104	45–34
80	April 14	@ Milwaukee	L 86–112	Keon Clark (18)	Antonio Davis (8)	Alvin Williams (11)	Bradley Center; 18,717	45–35
81	April 17	Detroit	W 94–92 (OT)	Vince Carter (21)	Antonio Davis, Charles Oakley (11)	Alvin Williams (12)	Air Canada Centre; 19,800	46–35
82	April 18	@ Washington	W 98–92	Vince Carter (34)	Charles Oakley (11)	Alvin Williams (11)	MCI Center; 16,427	47–35

2000–01 season schedule

== Playoffs ==
=== Game log ===
2001 playoff game log
First Round: 3–2 (home: 1–1; road: 2–1)

Game	Date	Team	Score	High points	High rebounds	High assists	Location Attendance	Record
1	April 22	@ New York	L 85–92	Davis, Williams (19)	Antonio Davis (15)	Alvin Williams (8)	Madison Square Garden; 19,763	0–1
2	April 26	@ New York	W 94–74	Alvin Williams (23)	Antonio Davis (12)	Chris Childs (7)	Madison Square Garden; 19,763	1–1
3	April 29	New York	L 89–97	Antonio Davis (21)	Antonio Davis (12)	Chris Childs (9)	Air Canada Centre; 20,217	1–2
4	May 2	New York	W 100–93	Vince Carter (32)	Antonio Davis (9)	Carter, Childs (4)	Air Canada Centre; 20,282	2–2
5	May 4	@ New York	W 93–89	Vince Carter (27)	Antonio Davis (12)	Chris Childs (9)	Madison Square Garden; 19,763	3–2

Conference semifinals: 3–4 (home: 2–1; road: 1–3)

Game	Date	Team	Score	High points	High rebounds	High assists	Location Attendance	Record
1	May 6	@ Philadelphia	W 96–93	Vince Carter (35)	Antonio Davis (12)	Vince Carter (7)	First Union Center; 20,892	1–0
2	May 9	@ Philadelphia	L 92–97	Vince Carter (28)	Antonio Davis (10)	Chris Childs (9)	First Union Center; 20,870	1–1
3	May 11	Philadelphia	W 102–78	Vince Carter (50)	Antonio Davis (14)	Chris Childs (10)	Air Canada Centre; 20,436	2–1
4	May 13	Philadelphia	L 79–84	Vince Carter (25)	Davis, Oakley (11)	Chris Childs (7)	Air Canada Centre; 20,351	2–2
5	May 16	@ Philadelphia	L 88–121	Vince Carter (16)	three players tied (5)	Chris Childs (8)	First Union Center; 20,939	2–3
6	May 18	Philadelphia	W 101–89	Vince Carter (39)	Antonio Davis (13)	Morris Peterson (7)	Air Canada Centre; 20,499	3–3
7	May 20	@ Philadelphia	L 87–88	Antonio Davis (23)	Charles Oakley (10)	Vince Carter (9)	First Union Center; 20,848	3–4

2001 schedule

== Player statistics ==
=== Regular season ===
Player	POS	GP	GS	MP	REB	AST	STL	BLK	PTS	MPG	RPG	APG	SPG	BPG	PPG
Alvin Williams	SG	82	34	2,394	212	407	123	26	802	29.2	2.6	5.0	1.5	.3	9.8
Morris Peterson	SG	80	49	1,809	259	105	63	20	747	22.6	3.2	1.3	.8	.3	9.3
Charles Oakley	PF	78	77	2,767	741	264	76	48	748	35.5	9.5	3.4	1.0	.6	9.6
Antonio Davis	C	78	77	2,729	787	106	22	151	1,069	35.0	10.1	1.4	.3	1.9	13.7
Vince Carter	SF	75	75	2,979	416	291	114	82	2,070	39.7	5.5	3.9	1.5	1.1	27.6
Dell Curry	SG	71	1	956	85	75	27	8	429	13.5	1.2	1.1	.4	.1	6.0
Mark Jackson^{†}	PG	54	54	1,802	185	498	63	7	461	33.4	3.4	9.2	1.2	.1	8.5
Keon Clark^{†}	PF	46	0	968	248	38	16	110	413	21.0	5.4	.8	.3	2.4	9.0
Corliss Williamson^{†}	SF	42	31	886	153	33	15	13	390	21.1	3.6	.8	.4	.3	9.3
Tracy Murray^{†}	SF	38	1	453	59	14	8	6	207	11.9	1.6	.4	.2	.2	5.4
Kevin Willis^{†}	C	35	9	771	223	21	19	21	309	22.0	6.4	.6	.5	.6	8.8
Chris Childs^{†}	PG	26	0	550	64	119	22	8	117	21.2	2.5	4.6	.8	.3	4.5
Jerome Williams^{†}	PF	26	0	378	104	13	18	10	131	14.5	4.0	.5	.7	.4	5.0
Michael Stewart	C	26	0	123	29	2	4	3	33	4.7	1.1	.1	.2	.1	1.3
Kornél Dávid^{†}	SF	17	0	140	33	4	2	3	42	8.2	1.9	.2	.1	.2	2.5
Tyrone Corbin	SF	15	1	117	13	4	2	0	20	7.8	.9	.3	.1	.0	1.3
Eric Montross^{†}	C	12	1	81	29	4	3	3	13	6.8	2.4	.3	.3	.3	1.1
Muggsy Bogues	PG	3	0	34	3	5	2	0	0	11.3	1.0	1.7	.7	.0	.0
Mamadou N'Diaye	C	3	0	10	2	0	0	0	4	3.3	.7	.0	.0	.0	1.3
Garth Joseph^{†}	C	2	0	8	2	1	0	0	2	4.0	1.0	.5	.0	.0	1.0

- ^{†} Denotes player spent time with another team in the season. Stats reflect time with the Raptors only.

=== Playoffs ===
Player	POS	GP	GS	MP	REB	AST	STL	BLK	PTS	MPG	RPG	APG	SPG	BPG	PPG
Vince Carter	SF	12	12	539	78	56	20	20	327	44.9	6.5	4.7	1.7	1.7	27.3
Alvin Williams	SG	12	12	486	35	50	15	8	165	40.5	2.9	4.2	1.3	.7	13.8
Antonio Davis	C	12	12	485	133	23	10	22	197	40.4	11.1	1.9	.8	1.8	16.4
Charles Oakley	PF	12	12	391	76	21	12	7	111	32.6	6.3	1.8	1.0	.6	9.3
Chris Childs	PG	12	9	380	38	78	12	3	109	31.7	3.2	6.5	1.0	.3	9.1
Dell Curry	SG	12	0	182	14	10	6	1	78	15.2	1.2	.8	.5	.1	6.5
Jerome Williams	PF	11	0	164	45	9	10	6	35	14.9	4.1	.8	.9	.5	3.2
Keon Clark	PF	11	0	103	23	6	2	3	35	9.4	2.1	.5	.2	.3	3.2
Morris Peterson	SG	8	3	110	12	15	6	0	43	13.8	1.5	1.9	.8	.0	5.4
Eric Montross	C	5	0	31	10	1	0	3	4	6.2	2.0	.2	.0	.6	.8
Tracy Murray	SF	2	0	5	0	0	1	0	2	2.5	.0	.0	.5	.0	1.0
Michael Stewart	C	2	0	4	1	0	0	0	0	2.0	.5	.0	.0	.0	.0

== Award winners ==
- Vince Carter, NBA All-Star Game Appearance, Starter
- Antonio Davis, NBA All-Star Game Appearance
- Vince Carter, All-NBA Second Team
- Morris Peterson, All-NBA Rookie First Team
