= 2000–01 Phoenix Suns season =

NBA team season

- Head coach: Scott Skiles
- General manager: Bryan Colangelo
- Owner: Jerry Colangelo
- Arena: America West Arena

Results
- Record: 51–31 (.622)
- Place: Division: 3rd (Pacific); Conference: 6th (Western)
- Playoff finish: First round (lost to Kings 1–3)
- Stats at Basketball Reference

Local media
- Television: KUTP; Fox Sports Net Arizona; Cox 9
- Radio: KTAR

The 2000–01 Phoenix Suns season was the 33rd season for the Phoenix Suns in the National Basketball Association.

== Season summary ==
=== Off-season ===
During the off-season, the Suns signed free agents Mario Elie, and Tony Delk, and acquired Chris Dudley from the New York Knicks in a four-team trade.

For the season, the Suns redesigned their primary logo, adding gray to their color scheme of purple, orange, black and white. The team's primary logo featured an orange basketball with black seams in front of a yellow sun in a purple box; the purple box is surrounded by a gray background featuring the city and team name in white letters. The team also redesigned their home and road uniforms, adding a V-shaped collar, and side panels to their jerseys and shorts, which featured their new alternate logo of a streaking basketball on their shorts. The white home uniforms featured the team name "Suns" on the front of their jerseys, a purple and orange trim, and purple side panels with orange outlines; the purple road uniforms featured the city name "Phoenix", a gray and orange trim, and gray side panels with orange outlines.

The team's new primary logo, and new uniforms would both remain in use until 2013.

=== Regular season ===
In their first full season with Scott Skiles as head coach, along with the addition of Delk and Elie, the Suns posted a seven-game winning streak early into the regular season, and held a 28–20 record at the All-Star break. The team posted another seven-game winning streak between March and April, and finished in third place in the Pacific Division with a 51–31 record, which earned them the sixth seed in the Western Conference; the Suns qualified for the NBA playoffs for the 13th consecutive year, which was a franchise record.

Second-year forward Shawn Marion showed improvement averaging 17.3 points, 10.7 rebounds, 1.7 steals and 1.4 blocks per game, while Jason Kidd averaged 16.9 points, 6.4 rebounds, 9.8 assists and 2.2 steals per game, and was named to the All-NBA First Team, and to the NBA All-Defensive First Team, and Clifford Robinson provided the team with 16.4 points and 4.1 rebounds per game. In addition, Delk and last season's Sixth Man of the Year, Rodney Rogers, both played sixth man roles off the bench, as Delk contributed 12.3 points per game, while Rogers provided with 12.2 points, 4.4 rebounds and 1.2 steals per game. Meanwhile, Penny Hardaway was the team's highest-paid player, but only played in just four games due to a knee injury, averaging 9.8 points, 3.8 assists and 1.5 steals per game, while Tom Gugliotta averaged 6.4 points and 4.5 rebounds per game, but only played 57 games also due to injury, rookie center, and second-round draft pick Jake Tsakalidis provided with 4.5 points and 4.2 rebounds per game, and Elie contributed 4.4 points per game.

During the NBA All-Star weekend at the MCI Center in Washington, D.C., Kidd was selected for the 2001 NBA All-Star Game, as a member of the Western Conference All-Star team. In addition, Kidd also participated in the NBA 2Ball Competition for the second consecutive year, along with Brandy Reed of the WNBA's Phoenix Mercury, while Marion was selected for the NBA Rookie Challenge Game, as a member of the Sophomores team. Kidd finished in eighth place in Most Valuable Player voting, while Marion finished in fourth place in Most Improved Player voting; Kidd and Marion both finished tied in eleventh place in Defensive Player of the Year voting, while Rogers finished tied in sixth place in Sixth Man of the Year voting, and with Delk finishing tied in tenth place.

The Suns finished ninth in the NBA in home-game attendance, with an attendance of 737,586 at the America West Arena during the regular season.

=== NBA playoffs ===
In the Western Conference First Round of the 2001 NBA playoffs, the Suns faced off against the 3rd–seeded Sacramento Kings, who were led by All-Star forward Chris Webber, Peja Stojaković, and All-Star center Vlade Divac. The Suns won Game 1 over the Kings on the road, 86–83 at the ARCO Arena II, but then lost the next three games, which included a Game 4 home loss to the Kings at the America West Arena, 89–82, thus losing the series in four games.

=== Aftermath ===
Following the season, Kidd was traded to the New Jersey Nets after four in a half seasons with the Suns, while Robinson was traded to the Detroit Pistons, Dudley re-signed as a free agent with his former team, the Portland Trail Blazers, and Elie retired.

== Offseason ==
=== NBA draft ===
Round	Pick	Player	Position	Nationality	College / Club Team
1	25	Iakovos "Jake" Tsakalidis	Center	Georgia	AEK (Greece)

== Roster ==
2000–01 Phoenix Suns roster
Players

Pos.	No.	Player	Height	Weight	DOB	From
G	8	Vinny Del Negro	6 ft 4 in (1.93 m)	185 lb (84 kg)	1966–08–09	NC State
G	00	Tony Delk	6 ft 1 in (1.85 m)	189 lb (86 kg)	1974–01–28	Kentucky
C	14	Chris Dudley	6 ft 11 in (2.11 m)	235 lb (107 kg)	1965–02–22	Yale
G	17	Mario Elie	6 ft 5 in (1.96 m)	210 lb (95 kg)	1963–11–26	American International
F	24	Tom Gugliotta	6 ft 10 in (2.08 m)	240 lb (109 kg)	1969–12–19	NC State
G	1	Penny Hardaway	6 ft 7 in (2.01 m)	195 lb (88 kg)	1971–07–18	Memphis
G	32	Jason Kidd	6 ft 4 in (1.93 m)	205 lb (93 kg)	1973–03–23	California
F	31	Shawn Marion	6 ft 7 in (2.01 m)	220 lb (100 kg)	1978–05–07	UNLV
G	2	Elliot Perry	6 ft 0 in (1.83 m)	150 lb (68 kg)	1969–03–28	Memphis
F	30	Clifford Robinson	6 ft 10 in (2.08 m)	225 lb (102 kg)	1966–12–16	Connecticut
F	54	Rodney Rogers	6 ft 7 in (2.01 m)	235 lb (107 kg)	1971–06–20	Wake Forest
C	15	Daniel Santiago	7 ft 1 in (2.16 m)	256 lb (116 kg)	1976–06–24	Saint Vincent
C	25	Jake Tsakalidis	7 ft 2 in (2.18 m)	285 lb (129 kg)	1979–06–10	Georgia

Coaches
Head coach
- Scott Skiles
Assistant(s)
- Jim Boylan
- Frank Johnson
- Phil Weber

Legend
- (DP) Unsigned draft pick
- (FA) Free agent
- (S) Suspended
- Injured

Roster
Updated: January 26, 2001

== Regular season ==
=== Standings ===
Pacific Division	W	L	PCT	GB	Home	Road	Div
y-Los Angeles Lakers	56	26	.683	–	31–10	25–16	14–10
x-Sacramento Kings	55	27	.671	1	33–8	22–19	16–8
x-Phoenix Suns	51	31	.622	5	31–10	20–21	12–12
x-Portland Trail Blazers	50	32	.610	6	28–13	22–19	12–12
e-Seattle SuperSonics	44	38	.537	12	26–15	18–23	17–7
e-Los Angeles Clippers	31	51	378	25	22–19	9–32	9–15
e-Golden State Warriors	17	65	.207	39	11–30	6–35	4–20

Western Conference
#	Team	W	L	PCT	GB
1	z-San Antonio Spurs	58	24	.707	–
2	y-Los Angeles Lakers	56	26	.683	2
3	x-Sacramento Kings	55	27	.671	3
4	x-Utah Jazz	53	29	.646	5
5	x-Dallas Mavericks	53	29	.646	5
6	x-Phoenix Suns	51	31	.622	7
7	x-Portland Trail Blazers	50	32	.610	8
8	x-Minnesota Timberwolves	47	35	.573	11
9	e-Houston Rockets	45	37	.549	13
10	e-Seattle SuperSonics	44	38	.537	14
11	e-Denver Nuggets	40	42	.488	18
12	e-Los Angeles Clippers	31	51	.378	27
13	e-Vancouver Grizzlies	23	59	.280	35
14	e-Golden State Warriors	17	65	.207	41

== Playoffs ==
2001 playoff game log
First Round: 1–3 (home: 0–2; road: 1–1)

Game	Date	Team	Score	High points	High rebounds	High assists	Location Attendance	Series
1	April 22	@ Sacramento	W 86–83	Shawn Marion (21)	Jake Tsakalidis (11)	Jason Kidd (14)	ARCO Arena; 17,317	1–0
2	April 25	@ Sacramento	L 90–116	Tony Delk (14)	Tom Gugliotta (8)	Jason Kidd (9)	ARCO Arena; 17,317	1–1
3	April 29	Sacramento	L 96–104	Jason Kidd (19)	Shawn Marion (10)	Jason Kidd (16)	America West Arena; 19,023	1–2
4	May 2	Sacramento	L 82–89	Clifford Robinson (24)	Jake Tsakalidis (12)	Jason Kidd (14)	America West Arena; 18,836	1–3

2001 schedule

== Awards and honors ==
=== All-Star ===
- Jason Kidd was voted as a starter for the Western Conference in the All-Star Game. It was his fourth All-Star selection. Kidd finished second in voting among Western Conference guards with 1,062,837 votes.

=== Season ===
- Jason Kidd was named to the All-NBA First Team. Kidd also finished eighth in MVP voting.
- Jason Kidd was named to the NBA All-Defensive First Team. Kidd also finished 11th in Defensive Player of the Year voting.
- Jason Kidd led the league in assists per game, with a 9.8 average, and total assists with 753.
- Shawn Marion finished 11th in Defensive Player of the Year voting, and fourth in Most Improved Player voting.
- Rodney Rogers finished sixth in Sixth Man of the Year voting. Rogers won the award the previous year in 2000.
- Tony Delk finished tenth in Sixth Man of the Year voting.

== Player statistics ==
Legend
GP	Games played	GS	Games started	MPG	Minutes per game
FG%	Field-goal percentage	3P%	3-point field-goal percentage	FT%	Free-throw percentage
RPG	Rebounds per game	APG	Assists per game	SPG	Steals per game
BPG	Blocks per game	PPG	Points per game

=== Season ===
Player	GP	GS	MPG	FG%	3P%	FT%	RPG	APG	SPG	BPG	PPG
Corie Blount*	30	6	12.9	.489†	.	.533	2.8	0.3	.4	.2	1.8
Vinny Del Negro*	36	0	14.6	.528†	.000	.893^	1.4	1.8	.6	.1	4.9
Tony Delk	82	11	27.9	.415	.321	.787	3.2	2.0	.9	.2	12.3
Chris Dudley	53	33	11.6	.397	.	.389	3.5	0.3	.3	.5	1.4
Mario Elie	68	67	22.1	.423	.360	.797	2.3	1.9	.9	.2	4.4
Rubén Garcés*	10	0	6.2	.467	.	.250	2.2	0.4	.2	.1	1.6
Tom Gugliotta	57	2	20.3	.392	.250	.792	4.5	1.0	.8	.4	6.4
Penny Hardaway	4	4	28.0	.417	.250	.636	4.5	3.8	1.5	.3	9.8
Jason Kidd	77	76	39.8	.411	.297	.814^	6.4	9.8	2.2	.3	16.9
Shawn Marion	79	79	36.2	.480†	.256	.810	10.7	2.0	1.7	1.4	17.3
Paul McPherson*	33	0	9.3	.490†	.000	.750	1.5	0.5	.4	.1	3.4
Elliot Perry*	43	6	10.7	.465	.250	.727	1.0	1.7	.4	.0	3.2
Clifford Robinson	82	82	33.5	.422	.361	.709	4.1	2.9	1.1	1.0	16.4
Rodney Rogers	82	3	26.6	.430	.296	.761	4.4	2.2	1.2	.6	12.2
Daniel Santiago	54	2	10.8	.478	.	.689	1.9	0.2	.3	.4	3.1
Jake Tsakalidis	57	39	16.6	.470	.	.593	4.2	0.3	.2	1.0	4.5

* – Stats with the Suns.
† – Minimum 300 field goals made.
^ – Minimum 125 free throws made.

=== Playoffs ===
Player	GP	GS	MPG	FG%	3P%	FT%	RPG	APG	SPG	BPG	PPG
Vinny Del Negro	3	0	8.7	.571	.	.	0.7	1.7	.0	.0	2.7
Tony Delk	4	0	28.5	.419	.400	.636	4.0	1.0	.8	.0	11.8
Chris Dudley	3	0	8.7	.500	.	.	2.3	0.0	.3	.3	0.7
Mario Elie	4	4	25.8	.452	.154	.750	3.3	1.8	.8	.3	9.0
Tom Gugliotta	4	0	21.5	.308	.	.778	3.8	0.8	2.0	.3	5.8
Jason Kidd	4	4	41.5	.319	.235	.750	6.0	13.3	2.0	.0	14.3
Shawn Marion	4	4	34.8	.371	1.000	.857	8.3	0.8	1.5	1.5	14.8
Elliot Perry	2	0	8.5	.600	.000	1.000	2.0	2.0	1.0	.0	6.5
Clifford Robinson	4	4	28.5	.420	.250	.636	4.0	1.0	1.5	.5	15.0
Rodney Rogers	4	0	20.5	.300	.200	.643	3.5	0.5	.5	.8	8.8
Daniel Santiago	1	0	12.0	.500	.	.	5.0	0.0	.0	2.0	2.0
Jake Tsakalidis	4	4	18.8	.375	.	.	7.0	0.0	.0	1.8	3.0

Player statistics citation:

== Transactions ==
=== Trades ===
September 20, 2000	To New York Knicks (Cuba) Lazaro Borrell (United States) Travis Knight (Australia) Luc Longley (United States) Vernon Maxwell (United States) Glen Rice (Georgia (country)) Vladimir Stepania 2001 first-round draft pick ( (United States) Jamaal Tinsley) 2001 second-round draft pick ( (United States) Eric Chenowith) 2001 second-round draft pick ( (United States) Michael Wright 2002 first-round draft pick ( (United States) Kareem Rush)	To Los Angeles Lakers (United States) Emanual Davis (United States) Greg Foster (United States) Horace Grant (United States) Chuck Person
September 20, 2000	To Seattle SuperSonics (United States) Patrick Ewing	To Phoenix Suns (United States) Chris Dudley 2001 first-round draft pick ( (United States) Jason Collins) Cash considerations
January 26, 2001	To Golden State Warriors (United States) Corie Blount (Panama) Rubén Garcés (United States) Paul McPherson	To Phoenix Suns (United States) Vinny Del Negro

=== Free agents ===
==== Additions ====
Date	Player	Contract	Former Team
August 1, 2000	Tony Delk	Signed to 6-year contract for $19 million	Sacramento Kings
August 2, 2000	Daniel Santiago	Signed to 1-year contract for $317,000	Pallacanestro Varese (Italy)
August 3, 2000	Corie Blount	Re-signed to 2-year contract for $3.2 million	Phoenix Suns
August 3, 2000	Justin Love	Undisclosed	
August 3, 2000	Rubén Garcés	Signed to 1-year contract for $317,000	La Crosse Bobcats (CBA)
August 22, 2000	Paul McPherson	Signed to 1-year contract for $317,000	
September 15, 2000	Mario Elie	Signed to 1-year contract for $1 million	San Antonio Spurs
September 29, 2000	Carlos Daniel	Undisclosed	Yakima Sun Kings (CBA)
September 29, 2000	DeJuan Wheat	Undisclosed	Idaho Stampede (CBA)
September 29, 2000	Lelan McDougal	Undisclosed	Billings RimRockers (IBA)
September 29, 2000	Tim Kempton	Undisclosed	Toronto Raptors
October 1, 2000	J. R. Koch	Undisclosed	Athlon Ieper (Belgium)
October 1, 2000	Reed Rawlings	Undisclosed	
December 8, 2000	Elliot Perry	Undisclosed	Orlando Magic
January 17, 2001	Elliot Perry	Signed two 10-day contracts	Phoenix Suns
February 6, 2001	Elliot Perry	Signed for rest of season	Phoenix Suns

==== Subtractions ====
Date	Player	Reason left	New team
June 30, 2000	Toby Bailey	Free agent	Los Angeles Stars (ABA)
August 8, 2000	Kevin Johnson	Retired	
August 31, 2000	Randy Livingston	Waived	Golden State Warriors
September 13, 2000	Don MacLean	Free agent	Miami Heat
October 6, 2000	J. R. Koch	Waived	Las Vegas Silver Bandits (IBL)
October 6, 2000	Lelan McDougal	Waived	San Diego Wildfire (ABA)
October 16, 2000	Carlos Daniel	Waived	Sioux Falls Skyforce (IBL)
October 16, 2000	Reed Rawlings	Waived	Detroit Dogs (ABA)
October 25, 2000	DeJuan Wheat	Waived	Panteras de Miranda (Venezuela)
October 25, 2000	Justin Love	Waived	Kansas City Knights (ABA)
October 25, 2000	Tim Kempton	Waived	
November 20, 2000	Rex Chapman	Retired	
January 5, 2001	Elliot Perry	Waived	Phoenix Suns

Player Transactions Citation:
