= 2000–01 Miami Heat season =

NBA professional basketball team season

- Head coach: Pat Riley
- President: Pat Riley
- General manager: Randy Pfund
- Owner: Micky Arison
- Arena: American Airlines Arena

Results
- Record: 50–32 (.610)
- Place: Division: 2nd (Atlantic); Conference: 3rd (Eastern)
- Playoff finish: First round (lost to Hornets 0–3)
- Stats at Basketball Reference

Local media
- Television: Sunshine Network, WBFS, WFOR
- Radio: WIOD

The 2000–01 Miami Heat season was the 13th season for the Miami Heat in the National Basketball Association.

== Season summary ==
=== Off-season ===
During the off-season, the Heat acquired All-Star guard Eddie Jones, Anthony Mason and Ricky Davis from the Charlotte Hornets, acquired Brian Grant from the Portland Trail Blazers in a three-team trade, and signed free agent A.C. Green. However, prior to the start of the regular season, All-Star center Alonzo Mourning suffered a kidney disorder after playing in the 2000 Summer Olympics in Sydney, Australia, and would only play in the final thirteen games of the season.

=== Regular season ===
Without Mourning, and despite the addition of Jones, Mason and Grant, the Heat struggled with a 5–9 start to the regular season, as Davis only played just seven games due to ankle and knee injuries, and was out for the remainder of the season. However, the team soon recovered playing above .500 in winning percentage as the season progressed, as the team acquired Cedric Ceballos in a trade with the Detroit Pistons in late November. The Heat held a 30–20 record at the All-Star break, and finished in second place in the Atlantic Division with a solid 50–32 record, which earned them the third seed in the Eastern Conference; the team qualified for the NBA playoffs for the sixth consecutive year.

Jones averaged 17.4 points, 4.6 rebounds and 1.7 steals per game, while Mason averaged 16.1 points and 9.6 rebounds per game, and Grant provided the team with 15.2 points and 8.8 rebounds per game. In addition, Tim Hardaway contributed 14.9 points and 6.3 assists per game, and also led the Heat with 189 three-point field goals, while Mourning averaged 13.6 points, 7.8 rebounds and 2.4 blocks per game, mostly playing off the bench as a backup center during his short 13-game stint. Meanwhile, Bruce Bowen contributed 7.6 points per game and 103 three-point field goals, despite shooting .363 in field-goal percentage, while second-year guard Anthony Carter provided the team with 6.4 points and 3.7 assists per game, three-point specialist Dan Majerle contributed 5.0 points per game, and Green averaged 4.5 points and 3.8 rebounds per game.

During the NBA All-Star weekend at the MCI Center in Washington, D.C., Mason and Mourning were both selected for the 2001 NBA All-Star Game, as members of the Eastern Conference All-Star team, although Mourning did not participate due to his kidney disorder; it was Mason's first and only All-Star appearance. Mason also finished tied in 15th place in Most Valuable Player voting, while head coach Pat Riley finished in fourth place in Coach of the Year voting.

The Heat finished 15th in the NBA in home-game attendance, with an attendance of 678,186 at the American Airlines Arena during the regular season.

=== NBA playoffs ===
In the Eastern Conference First Round of the 2001 NBA playoffs, the Heat faced off against the 6th–seeded Charlotte Hornets, a team that featured former Heat forward Jamal Mashburn, David Wesley, and second-year star Baron Davis. The Heat struggled losing their first two home games to the Hornets, suffering two 26-point losses at the American Airlines Arena, 106–80 in Game 1, and 102–76 in Game 2; Hardaway re-injured his left foot in Game 2, in which he sustained during the final month of the regular season. Without Hardaway, the Heat lost Game 3 to the Hornets on the road, 94–79 at the Charlotte Coliseum, thus losing the series in a three-game sweep.

=== Aftermath ===
The Heat made several transactions in the following off-season; Mason signed as a free agent with the Milwaukee Bucks, while Hardaway was traded to the Dallas Mavericks after five in a half seasons with the Heat, and Bowen signed with the San Antonio Spurs. Meanwhile, Ceballos signed with the Denver Nuggets, but was later on waived and then retired, Davis was traded to the Cleveland Cavaliers, Majerle re-signed with his former team, the Phoenix Suns, and Green and Duane Causwell both retired.

== Offseason ==
=== Draft picks ===
Round	Pick	Player	Position	Nationality	School/Club team
2	37	Eddie House	PG/SG	United States	Arizona State
2	52	Ernest Brown	C	United States	Indian Hills Community College

== Roster ==
2000–01 Miami Heat roster
Players

Pos.	No.	Player	Height	Weight	DOB	From
F	12	Bruce Bowen	6 ft 7 in (2.01 m)	185 lb (84 kg)	1971–06–14	Cal State Fullerton
G	25	Anthony Carter	6 ft 1 in (1.85 m)	190 lb (86 kg)	1975–06–16	Hawaiʻi
C	4	Duane Causwell	7 ft 0 in (2.13 m)	240 lb (109 kg)	1968–05–31	Temple
F	23	Cedric Ceballos	6 ft 6 in (1.98 m)	190 lb (86 kg)	1969–08–02	Cal State Fullerton
G/F	21	Ricky Davis	6 ft 6 in (1.98 m)	195 lb (88 kg)	1979–09–23	Iowa
C	35	Todd Fuller	6 ft 11 in (2.11 m)	255 lb (116 kg)	1974–07–25	NC State
F/C	44	Brian Grant	6 ft 9 in (2.06 m)	254 lb (115 kg)	1972–03–05	Xavier
F	45	A.C. Green	6 ft 9 in (2.06 m)	220 lb (100 kg)	1963–10–04	Oregon State
G	10	Tim Hardaway	6 ft 0 in (1.83 m)	175 lb (79 kg)	1966–09–01	UTEP
G	5	Eddie House	6 ft 1 in (1.85 m)	180 lb (82 kg)	1978–05–14	Arizona State
G/F	6	Eddie Jones	6 ft 6 in (1.98 m)	200 lb (91 kg)	1971–10–20	Temple
F	7	Don MacLean	6 ft 10 in (2.08 m)	235 lb (107 kg)	1970–01–16	UCLA
G/F	9	Dan Majerle	6 ft 6 in (1.98 m)	215 lb (98 kg)	1965–09–09	Central Michigan
F	14	Anthony Mason	6 ft 7 in (2.01 m)	250 lb (113 kg)	1966–12–14	Tennessee State
C	33	Alonzo Mourning	6 ft 10 in (2.08 m)	240 lb (109 kg)	1970–02–08	Georgetown
F	13	Jamal Robinson	6 ft 7 in (2.01 m)	220 lb (100 kg)	1973–12–27	Virginia

Coaches
Head coach
- Pat Riley
Assistant(s)
- Keith Askins
- Jeff Bzdelik
- Bill Foran
- Marc Iavaroni
- Bob McAdoo
- Erik Spoelstra
- Stan Van Gundy

Legend
- (DP) Unsigned draft pick
- (FA) Free agent
- (S) Suspended
- Injured

Roster
Updated: November 26, 2000

== Regular season ==
=== Season standings ===
Atlantic Division	W	L	PCT	GB	Home	Road	Div
y-Philadelphia 76ers	56	26	.683	–	29–12	27–14	18–6
x-Miami Heat	50	32	.610	6	29–12	21–20	15–10
x-New York Knicks	48	34	.585	8	30–11	18–23	16–9
x-Orlando Magic	43	39	.524	13	26–15	17–24	14–10
e-Boston Celtics	36	46	.439	20	20–21	16–25	11–13
e-New Jersey Nets	26	56	.317	30	18–23	8–33	8–16
e-Washington Wizards	19	63	.232	37	12–29	7–34	3–21

Eastern Conference
#	Team	W	L	PCT	GB
1	c-Philadelphia 76ers	56	26	.683	–
2	y-Milwaukee Bucks	52	30	.634	4
3	x-Miami Heat	50	32	.610	6
4	x-New York Knicks	48	34	.585	8
5	x-Toronto Raptors	47	35	.573	9
6	x-Charlotte Hornets	46	36	.561	10
7	x-Orlando Magic	43	39	.524	13
8	x-Indiana Pacers	41	41	.500	15
9	e-Boston Celtics	36	46	.439	20
10	e-Detroit Pistons	32	50	.390	24
11	e-Cleveland Cavaliers	30	52	.366	26
12	e-New Jersey Nets	26	56	.317	30
13	e-Atlanta Hawks	25	57	.305	31
14	e-Washington Wizards	19	63	.232	37
15	e-Chicago Bulls	15	67	.183	42

z - clinched division title
y - clinched division title
x - clinched playoff spot

== Playoffs ==
2001 playoff game log
First round: 0–3 (home: 0–2; road: 0–1)

Game	Date	Team	Score	High points	High rebounds	High assists	Location Attendance	Series
1	April 21	Charlotte	L 80–106	Eddie House (16)	Brian Grant (10)	Tim Hardaway (5)	American Airlines Arena; 20,085	0–1
2	April 23	Charlotte	L 76–102	Eddie Jones (21)	Grant, Jones (6)	Tim Hardaway (4)	American Airlines Arena; 16,500	0–2
3	April 27	@ Charlotte	L 79–94	Eddie Jones (22)	Alonzo Mourning (9)	Anthony Carter (5)	Charlotte Coliseum; 22,283	0–3

2001 schedule

== Player statistics ==
=== Regular season ===
Player	POS	GP	GS	MP	REB	AST	STL	BLK	PTS	MPG	RPG	APG	SPG	BPG	PPG
Brian Grant	C	82	79	2,771	718	101	60	71	1,250	33.8	8.8	1.2	.7	.9	15.2
Bruce Bowen	SF	82	72	2,685	245	132	83	53	623	32.7	3.0	1.6	1.0	.6	7.6
A.C. Green	PF	82	1	1,411	313	39	30	8	367	17.2	3.8	.5	.4	.1	4.5
Anthony Mason	PF	80	80	3,254	770	248	80	25	1,290	40.7	9.6	3.1	1.0	.3	16.1
Tim Hardaway	PG	77	77	2,613	204	483	90	6	1,150	33.9	2.6	6.3	1.2	.1	14.9
Anthony Carter	PG	72	6	1,630	180	268	73	10	461	22.6	2.5	3.7	1.0	.1	6.4
Eddie Jones	SG	63	58	2,282	292	171	110	58	1,094	36.2	4.6	2.7	1.7	.9	17.4
Dan Majerle	SG	53	19	1,306	166	88	53	15	267	24.6	3.1	1.7	1.0	.3	5.0
Eddie House	PG	50	0	550	42	52	13	0	251	11.0	.8	1.0	.3	.0	5.0
Duane Causwell	C	31	14	384	83	5	8	18	76	12.4	2.7	.2	.3	.6	2.5
Cedric Ceballos^{†}	SF	27	0	393	80	13	10	4	186	14.6	3.0	.5	.4	.1	6.9
Alonzo Mourning	C	13	3	306	101	12	4	31	177	23.5	7.8	.9	.3	2.4	13.6
Todd Fuller	C	10	0	77	18	1	3	2	28	7.7	1.8	.1	.3	.2	2.8
Don MacLean	SF	8	1	76	18	4	5	1	31	9.5	2.3	.5	.6	.1	3.9
Ricky Davis	SG	7	0	70	7	11	5	2	32	10.0	1.0	1.6	.7	.3	4.6
Jamal Robinson	SF	6	0	72	11	2	6	0	6	12.0	1.8	.3	1.0	.0	1.0

- ^{†} Denotes player spent time with another team in the season. Stats reflect time with the Heat only.

=== Playoffs ===
Player	POS	GP	GS	MP	REB	AST	STL	BLK	PTS	MPG	RPG	APG	SPG	BPG	PPG
Eddie Jones	SG	3	3	108	18	7	3	1	57	36.0	6.0	2.3	1.0	.3	19.0
Anthony Mason	PF	3	3	98	9	4	1	0	16	32.7	3.0	1.3	.3	.0	5.3
Alonzo Mourning	C	3	3	91	16	3	0	5	35	30.3	5.3	1.0	.0	1.7	11.7
Bruce Bowen	SF	3	3	58	2	2	2	2	12	19.3	.7	.7	.7	.7	4.0
Anthony Carter	PG	3	1	69	6	11	2	1	18	23.0	2.0	3.7	.7	.3	6.0
Brian Grant	C	3	0	84	24	1	0	5	30	28.0	8.0	.3	.0	1.7	10.0
Dan Majerle	SG	3	0	71	10	5	3	0	16	23.7	3.3	1.7	1.0	.0	5.3
Eddie House	PG	3	0	64	5	5	3	1	38	21.3	1.7	1.7	1.0	.3	12.7
A.C. Green	PF	3	0	21	4	2	1	0	3	7.0	1.3	.7	.3	.0	1.0
Cedric Ceballos	SF	3	0	15	6	1	0	0	5	5.0	2.0	.3	.0	.0	1.7
Tim Hardaway	PG	2	2	36	2	9	0	0	5	18.0	1.0	4.5	.0	.0	2.5
Duane Causwell	C	1	0	5	3	0	0	0	0	5.0	3.0	.0	.0	.0	.0
