= 2000–01 New York Knicks season =

Season of National Basketball Association team the New York Knicks

- Head coach: Jeff Van Gundy
- General manager: Scott Layden
- Owners: Cablevision
- Arena: Madison Square Garden

Results
- Record: 48–34 (.585)
- Place: Division: 3rd (Atlantic); Conference: 4th (Eastern)
- Playoff finish: First round (lost to Raptors 2–3)
- Stats at Basketball Reference

Local media
- Television: MSG Network
- Radio: WFAN

The 2000–01 New York Knicks season was the 54th season for the New York Knicks in the National Basketball Association.

== Season summary ==
=== Off-season ===
During the off-season, the Knicks acquired All-Star forward Glen Rice from the Los Angeles Lakers in a four-team trade, acquired Erick Strickland from the Dallas Mavericks on draft day, and acquired Luc Longley from the Phoenix Suns; Longley won three NBA championships with the Chicago Bulls during their second three-peat in the 1990s.

=== Regular season ===
With the addition of Rice, and in their first season without Patrick Ewing since the 1984–85 season, the Knicks remained a perennial playoff contender, holding a 29–18 record at the All-Star break. At mid-season, the team traded Chris Childs to the Toronto Raptors in exchange for former Knicks guard Mark Jackson and Muggsy Bogues, who never played for the Knicks due to a knee injury, while Strickland was dealt to the Vancouver Grizzlies in exchange for Othella Harrington. The Knicks finished in third place in the Atlantic Division with a 48–34 record, and earned the fourth seed in the Eastern Conference; the team qualified for the NBA playoffs for the 14th consecutive year.

Allan Houston led the Knicks in scoring with 18.7 points per game, while Latrell Sprewell averaged 17.7 points, 3.5 assists and 1.4 steals per game, and Rice contributed 12.0 points per game. In addition, Marcus Camby provided the team with 12.0 points, 11.5 rebounds and 2.2 blocks per game, while Kurt Thomas averaged 10.4 points and 6.7 rebounds per game, Larry Johnson provided with 9.9 points and 5.6 rebounds per game, and Charlie Ward contributed 7.1 points and 4.5 assists per game. Meanwhile, Harrington averaged 6.2 points and 3.3 rebounds per game in 30 games after the trade, and Jackson provided with 5.9 points and 5.6 assists per game in 29 games.

During the NBA All-Star weekend at the MCI Center in Washington, D.C., Houston and Sprewell were both selected for the 2001 NBA All-Star Game, as members of the Eastern Conference All-Star team; it was the final All-Star appearance for both players. In addition, Houston also participated in the NBA Three-Point Shootout. The Knicks finished fourth in the NBA in home-game attendance, with an attendance of 810,283 at Madison Square Garden during the regular season.

=== NBA playoffs ===
In the Eastern Conference First Round of the 2001 NBA playoffs, and for the second consecutive year, the Knicks faced off against the 5th–seeded Raptors, who were led by All-Star guard Vince Carter, All-Star center Antonio Davis, and former Knicks forward Charles Oakley. With the series tied at 1–1, the Knicks won Game 3 over the Raptors on the road, 97–89 at the Air Canada Centre to take a 2–1 series lead. However, the Knicks lost the next two games, which included a Game 5 loss to the Raptors at home, 93–89 at Madison Square Garden, thus losing in a hard-fought five-game series; it was the first time that the Knicks lost in the opening round of the NBA playoffs since the 1990–91 season.

=== Aftermath ===
Following the season, Rice was traded to the Houston Rockets after only one season in New York. Also following the season, due to lingering injuries, Johnson, Longley and Bogues all retired. The Knicks would not return to the NBA playoffs again until the 2003–04 season.

== Offseason ==
After 15 years with the New York Knicks, due to chronological age and injuries, Patrick Ewing parted ways with the organization on September 20, 2000, in a 4-team trade which involves the Seattle SuperSonics, the Phoenix Suns, and the Los Angeles Lakers. In the deal, the Knicks acquire Travis Knight, Glen Rice, and a 2001 1st round draft pick (#27, traded to Vancouver) from the Lakers, Luc Longley from the Phoenix Suns, Lazaro Borrell, Vernon Maxwell, Vladimir Stepania, two 2001 2nd round picks (#s 39 and 43; neither player selected ever played in the NBA), and a 2002 1st round pick (#20, traded to Toronto) from Seattle. During regular season, the Knicks later traded Erick Strickland, a 2001 1st and 2nd round draft picks to the Vancouver Grizzlies for Othella Harrington. And then Chris Childs and a 2002 1st round pick to the Toronto Raptors for Muggsy Bogues and Mark Jackson.

== NBA draft ==
Round	Pick	Player	Position	Nationality	School/Club team
1	22	Donnell Harvey	PF	United States	Florida
2	39	Lavor Postell	SG	United States	St. John's

== Roster ==
2000–01 New York Knicks roster
Players

Pos.	No.	Player	Height	Weight	DOB	From
G	–	Muggsy Bogues (injured) (IN)	5 ft 3 in (1.60 m)	136 lb (62 kg)	1965–01–09	Wake Forest
G	9	Rick Brunson	6 ft 4 in (1.93 m)	190 lb (86 kg)	1972–06–14	Temple
F/C	23	Marcus Camby	6 ft 11 in (2.11 m)	220 lb (100 kg)	1974–03–22	UMass
F/C	32	Othella Harrington	6 ft 9 in (2.06 m)	235 lb (107 kg)	1974–01–31	Georgetown
G	20	Allan Houston	6 ft 6 in (1.98 m)	205 lb (93 kg)	1971–04–20	Tennessee
G	31	Mark Jackson	6 ft 1 in (1.85 m)	180 lb (82 kg)	1965–04–01	St. John's
F	2	Larry Johnson (injured)	6 ft 6 in (1.98 m)	250 lb (113 kg)	1969–03–14	UNLV
C	44	Travis Knight	7 ft 0 in (2.13 m)	235 lb (107 kg)	1974–09–13	Connecticut
C	13	Luc Longley (injured)	7 ft 2 in (2.18 m)	265 lb (120 kg)	1969–01–19	New Mexico
G/F	7	Lavor Postell	6 ft 5 in (1.96 m)	215 lb (98 kg)	1978–02–26	St. John's
F	41	Glen Rice	6 ft 7 in (2.01 m)	215 lb (98 kg)	1967–05–28	Michigan
C	50	Felton Spencer	7 ft 0 in (2.13 m)	265 lb (120 kg)	1968–01–15	Louisville
G/F	8	Latrell Sprewell	6 ft 5 in (1.96 m)	190 lb (86 kg)	1970–09–08	Alabama
F/C	40	Kurt Thomas	6 ft 9 in (2.06 m)	240 lb (109 kg)	1972–10–04	TCU
G	21	Charlie Ward	6 ft 2 in (1.88 m)	190 lb (86 kg)	1970–10–12	Florida State

Coaches
Head coach
- Jeff Van Gundy
Assistant(s)
- Greg Brittenham
- Don Chaney
- Steve Clifford
- Kevin O'Neill
- Tom Thibodeau

Legend
- (DP) Unsigned draft pick
- (FA) Free agent
- (S) Suspended
- (IN) Inactive
- Injured

Roster
Updated: February 22, 2001

=== Roster notes ===
- Point guard Muggsy Bogues was acquired by the Knicks from the Toronto Raptors in a mid-season trade, but was placed on the injured reserve list due to a chronic knee injury he sustained with the Raptors, and did not play for the Knicks.

== Regular season ==
=== Standings ===
Atlantic Division	W	L	PCT	GB	Home	Road	Div
y-Philadelphia 76ers	56	26	.683	–	29–12	27–14	18–6
x-Miami Heat	50	32	.610	6	29–12	21–20	15–10
x-New York Knicks	48	34	.585	8	30–11	18–23	16–9
x-Orlando Magic	43	39	.524	13	26–15	17–24	14–10
e-Boston Celtics	36	46	.439	20	20–21	16–25	11–13
e-New Jersey Nets	26	56	.317	30	18–23	8–33	8–16
e-Washington Wizards	19	63	.232	37	12–29	7–34	3–21

Eastern Conference
#	Team	W	L	PCT	GB
1	c-Philadelphia 76ers	56	26	.683	–
2	y-Milwaukee Bucks	52	30	.634	4
3	x-Miami Heat	50	32	.610	6
4	x-New York Knicks	48	34	.585	8
5	x-Toronto Raptors	47	35	.573	9
6	x-Charlotte Hornets	46	36	.561	10
7	x-Orlando Magic	43	39	.524	13
8	x-Indiana Pacers	41	41	.500	15
9	e-Boston Celtics	36	46	.439	20
10	e-Detroit Pistons	32	50	.390	24
11	e-Cleveland Cavaliers	30	52	.366	26
12	e-New Jersey Nets	26	56	.317	30
13	e-Atlanta Hawks	25	57	.305	31
14	e-Washington Wizards	19	63	.232	37
15	e-Chicago Bulls	15	67	.183	42

z - clinched division title
y - clinched division title
x - clinched playoff spot

=== Schedule ===
Game	Date	Opponent	Result	Knicks points	Opponents	Record	Streak	Notes
1								

== Playoffs ==
2001 playoff game log
First Round: 2–3 (home: 1–2; road: 1–1)

Game	Date	Team	Score	High points	High rebounds	High assists	Location Attendance	Series
1	April 22	Toronto	W 92–85	Allan Houston (23)	Marcus Camby (18)	Mark Jackson (6)	Madison Square Garden; 19,763	1–0
2	April 26	Toronto	L 74–94	Kurt Thomas (23)	Kurt Thomas (12)	Mark Jackson (5)	Madison Square Garden; 19,763	1–1
3	April 29	@ Toronto	W 97–89	Allan Houston (24)	Kurt Thomas (9)	Latrell Sprewell (5)	Air Canada Centre; 20,217	2–1
4	May 2	@ Toronto	L 93–100	Allan Houston (27)	Kurt Thomas (10)	Kurt Thomas (5)	Air Canada Centre; 20,282	2–2
5	May 4	Toronto	L 89–93	Latrell Sprewell (29)	Kurt Thomas (12)	Mark Jackson (7)	Madison Square Garden; 19,763	2–3

2001 schedule

== Player statistics ==
Legend
GP	Games played	GS	Games started	MPG	Minutes per game
FG%	Field-goal percentage	3P%	3-point field-goal percentage	FT%	Free-throw percentage
RPG	Rebounds per game	APG	Assists per game	SPG	Steals per game
BPG	Blocks per game	PPG	Points per game

=== Regular season ===
Player	GP	GS	MPG	FG%	3P%	FT%	RPG	APG	SPG	BPG	PPG
Rick Brunson^{†}	15	0	4.4	.421	.000	.667	.8	.5	.1	.0	1.3
Marcus Camby	63	63	33.8	.524	.125	.667	11.5	.8	1.0	2.2	12.0
Chris Childs^{†}	51	5	25.7	.419	.313	.848	2.7	4.6	.7	.1	4.8
Othella Harrington^{†}	30	5	18.3	.554		.729	3.3	.7	.5	.6	6.2
Allan Houston	78	78	36.6	.449	.381	.909	3.6	2.2	.7	.1	18.7
Mark Jackson^{†}	29	28	27.1	.411	.310	.529	4.1	5.6	.7	.0	5.9
Larry Johnson	65	65	32.4	.411	.313	.797	5.6	2.0	.6	.4	9.9
Travis Knight	45	0	5.7	.189	.000	.500	1.2	.1	.1	.2	.6
Luc Longley	25	2	12.0	.333		.765	2.6	.3	.1	.4	2.0
Lavor Postell	26	0	6.5	.315	.273	.815	1.0	.2	.2	.1	2.3
Glen Rice	75	25	29.5	.440	.389	.852	4.1	1.2	.5	.2	12.0
Felton Spencer	18	0	6.3	.600		.600	1.9	.1	.1	.1	2.2
Latrell Sprewell	77	77	39.2	.430	.304	.783	4.5	3.5	1.4	.4	17.7
Erick Strickland^{†}	28	0	15.0	.305	.340	.857	1.9	1.0	.8	.0	4.3
Kurt Thomas	77	29	27.6	.511	.333	.814	6.7	.8	.8	.9	10.4
Charlie Ward	61	33	24.5	.416	.383	.800	2.6	4.5	1.1	.2	7.1

=== Playoffs ===
Player	GP	GS	MPG	FG%	3P%	FT%	RPG	APG	SPG	BPG	PPG
Rick Brunson	2	0	2.0	.000		.750	.0	.0	.0	.0	1.5
Marcus Camby	4	4	35.3	.385		.385	8.0	1.8	.5	2.3	6.3
Othella Harrington	5	1	15.4	.500		.800	3.0	.4	.8	.4	3.6
Allan Houston	5	5	37.8	.594	.545	1.000	1.8	1.4	1.0	.2	20.8
Mark Jackson	5	5	31.2	.500	.250	1.000	5.2	5.2	1.6	.0	9.0
Travis Knight	1	0	1.0				.0	.0	.0	.0	.0
Glen Rice	5	0	28.8	.462	.429	.875	4.4	.6	.6	.2	12.2
Felton Spencer	2	0	2.0				.0	.0	.0	.0	.0
Latrell Sprewell	5	5	42.4	.407	.214	.760	3.0	3.4	1.0	.2	18.4
Kurt Thomas	5	5	37.2	.532		.710	11.2	1.8	.4	1.0	14.4
Charlie Ward	5	0	17.2	.296	.250	1.000	1.4	1.4	.4	.0	5.0

- ^{†} Denotes player spent time with another team in the season. Stats reflect time with the Knicks only.

Player statistics citation:

== See also ==
- 2000–01 NBA season
