= 2000–01 Chicago Bulls season =

NBA professional basketball team season

- Head coach: Tim Floyd
- General manager: Jerry Krause
- Owner: Jerry Reinsdorf
- Arena: United Center

Results
- Record: 15–67 (.183)
- Place: Division: 8th (Central); Conference: 15th (Eastern)
- Playoff finish: Did not qualify
- Stats at Basketball Reference

Local media
- Television: Fox Sports Net Chicago (43 games); Fox Sports Net Chicago Plus (3 games); WGN (25 games); WCIU (10 games)
- Radio: WMVP

The 2000–01 Chicago Bulls season was the 35th season for the Chicago Bulls in the National Basketball Association.

== Season summary ==
=== Off-season ===
The Bulls received the fourth overall pick in the 2000 NBA draft, and selected power forward Marcus Fizer out of Iowa State University; the team also selected center Chris Mihm from the University of Texas at Austin with the seventh overall pick. However, the Bulls soon traded Mihm to the Cleveland Cavaliers in exchange for rookie shooting guard, and first-round draft pick Jamal Crawford from the University of Michigan. During the off-season, the team signed free agents Ron Mercer, Brad Miller and Bryce Drew.

=== Regular season ===
With the addition of Mercer, Miller, Fizer and Crawford, the Bulls continued to struggle losing 24 of their first 27 games of the regular season, and later on held a 6–42 record at the All-Star break. The team finished in last place in the Central Division with a league-worst 15–67 record, which was also their worst record in franchise history.

Second-year star Elton Brand averaged 20.1 points, 10.1 rebounds and 1.6 blocks per game, while Mercer averaged 19.7 points and 1.3 steals per game, and second-year forward Ron Artest provided the team with 11.9 points and 2.0 steals per game. In addition, Fizer averaged 9.5 points and 4.3 rebounds per game, and was named to the NBA All-Rookie Second Team, while Fred Hoiberg contributed 9.1 points, 3.6 assists and 1.3 steals per game, and led the Bulls with 103 three-point field goals, Miller provided with 8.9 points and 7.4 rebounds per game, and Drew contributed 6.3 points and 3.9 assists per game. Meanwhile, rookie point guard, and second-round draft pick Khalid El-Amin averaged 6.3 points and 2.9 steals per game, but was released to free agency in March, Crawford contributed 4.6 points per game, but only shot .352 in field-goal percentage, and second-year forward Michael Ruffin provided with 2.6 points and 5.8 rebounds per game.

During the NBA All-Star weekend at the MCI Center in Washington, D.C., Brand and El-Amin were both selected for the NBA Rookie Challenge Game, as Brand was a member of the Sophomores team, while El-Amin was a member of the Rookies team. The Bulls finished second in the NBA in home-game attendance behind the San Antonio Spurs, with an attendance of 888,654 at the United Center during the regular season.

=== Aftermath ===
Following the season, Brand was traded to the Los Angeles Clippers on draft day, and after two seasons with the Bulls, while Drew signed as a free agent with the Charlotte Hornets, and Ruffin signed with the Philadelphia 76ers. (See 2000–01 Chicago Bulls season#Regular season)

== NBA draft ==
| Round | Pick | Player | Position | Nationality | School/Club team |
|---|---|---|---|---|---|
| 1 | 4 | Marcus Fizer | PF | United States | Iowa State |
| 1 | 7 | Chris Mihm | C | United States | Texas |
| 1 | 24 | Dalibor Bagarić | C | Croatia | Benston Zagreb (Croatia) |
| 2 | 32 | A.J. Guyton | PG | United States | Indiana |
| 2 | 33 | Jake Voskuhl | C | United States | Connecticut |
| 2 | 34 | Khalid El-Amin | PG | United States | Connecticut |

== Roster ==
2000–01 Chicago Bulls roster
Players

| Pos. | No. | Player | Height | Weight | DOB | From |
|---|---|---|---|---|---|---|
| F | 15 | Ron Artest | 6 ft 7 in (2.01 m) | 244 lb (111 kg) | 1979–11–13 | St. John's |
| C | 44 | Dalibor Bagaric | 7 ft 1 in (2.16 m) | 255 lb (116 kg) | 1980–02–07 | Croatia |
| G | 25 | Corey Benjamin | 6 ft 6 in (1.98 m) | 200 lb (91 kg) | 1978–02–24 | Oregon State |
| F/C | 42 | Elton Brand | 6 ft 8 in (2.03 m) | 275 lb (125 kg) | 1979–03–11 | Duke |
| G | 1 | Jamal Crawford (injured) | 6 ft 6 in (1.98 m) | 185 lb (84 kg) | 1980–03–20 | Michigan |
| G | 24 | Bryce Drew (injured) | 6 ft 2 in (1.88 m) | 185 lb (84 kg) | 1974–09–21 | Valparaiso |
| G | 2 | Khalid El-Amin | 5 ft 10 in (1.78 m) | 200 lb (91 kg) | 1979–04–25 | Connecticut |
| F | 21 | Marcus Fizer | 6 ft 9 in (2.06 m) | 262 lb (119 kg) | 1978–08–10 | Iowa State |
| F | 30 | Steve Goodrich | 6 ft 10 in (2.08 m) | 220 lb (100 kg) | 1976–03–18 | Princeton |
| G | 11 | A. J. Guyton | 6 ft 1 in (1.85 m) | 180 lb (82 kg) | 1978–02–12 | Indiana |
| G | 20 | Fred Hoiberg | 6 ft 4 in (1.93 m) | 203 lb (92 kg) | 1972–10–15 | Iowa State |
| G/F | 5 | Ron Mercer | 6 ft 7 in (2.01 m) | 210 lb (95 kg) | 1976–05–18 | Kentucky |
| F/C | 40 | Brad Miller | 6 ft 11 in (2.11 m) | 244 lb (111 kg) | 1976–04–12 | Purdue |
| F | 51 | Michael Ruffin (injured) | 6 ft 9 in (2.06 m) | 246 lb (112 kg) | 1977–01–21 | Tulsa |
| C | 12 | Dragan Tarlac | 6 ft 10 in (2.08 m) | 260 lb (118 kg) | 1973–05–09 | Serbia |
| C | 43 | Jake Voskuhl | 6 ft 11 in (2.11 m) | 245 lb (111 kg) | 1977–11–01 | Connecticut |

Coaches
Head coach
- Tim Floyd
Assistant(s)
- Bill Berry
- Bill Cartwright
- Norm Ellenberger
- Phil Johnson

Legend
- (DP) Unsigned draft pick
- (FA) Free agent
- (S) Suspended
- Injured

Roster
Updated: March 20, 2001

== Regular season ==
The Bulls’ intentions going into the 2000-01 NBA season was to recruit a pair of the summer's elite free agents—a group that included Tim Duncan, Grant Hill, Tracy McGrady and Eddie Jones—to be the core players in the re-building process. However, Duncan re-signed with San Antonio, Hill accommodated his wife's desires to go to Orlando, and McGrady and Jones both opted to play near their home towns.

“It wasn't so much a rejection of Chicago,” Bulls owner Jerry Reinsdorf stated, “as it was other considerations that compelled these individuals to make the decisions that they made to play for the teams they chose to play with.”

Thus, the Bulls changed gears and focused on rebuilding through the draft and with youth. In the 2000 NBA draft, the Bulls took some steps in that direction, selecting Marcus Fizer (4th overall), and acquiring Jamal Crawford (selected 8th overall by Cleveland and immediately traded to the Bulls). Other notable off-season acquisitions included the signing of free agents Ron Mercer (Aug. 2), and Brad Miller (Sept. 7).

Opening the season with the youngest roster in NBA history—an average of 22.9 years of age and seven rookies—isn't typically a recipe for success in the league. The Bulls finished the season with the league's worst record at 15–67 in Head Coach Tim Floyd's second full season. The team broke the franchise record for longest losing streak at the United Center with an eight-game stretch from Nov. 11 to Dec. 19 (previous record was six games), and set a new record for consecutive losses with 16 from Jan. 8 through Feb. 6 (previous record was 13 games in 1976). In addition, Chicago endured the longest road losing streak in franchise history, dropping 25 straight on the road from Dec. 21 through Apr. 10.

A bright spot in the 2000–01 Chicago Bulls season was starting 2–0 after the All Star break, with upset wins at home over the Atlanta Hawks on Tuesday, February 13, and the Miami Heat on Saturday, February 17, 2001.

The Bulls’ home sellout streak ended at 610 games on Nov. 3 vs. New Jersey, marking the third longest sellout streak in NBA history. Prior to that, the last time the Bulls failed to sell out a home game was November 17, 1987, vs. Washington. Other news items from the season included second-year forward Elton Brand (sophomore team) and rookie guard Khalid El-Amin (rookie team) both participating in the Schick Rookie Challenge at All-Star Weekend, and Marcus Fizer being named to the NBA's All-Rookie Second Team.

=== Standings ===
| Central Division | W | L | PCT | GB | Home | Road | Div |
|---|---|---|---|---|---|---|---|
| y-Milwaukee Bucks | 52 | 30 | .634 | – | 31–10 | 21–20 | 19–9 |
| x-Toronto Raptors | 47 | 35 | .573 | 5 | 27–14 | 20–21 | 18–10 |
| x-Charlotte Hornets | 46 | 36 | .561 | 6 | 28–13 | 18–23 | 20–8 |
| x-Indiana Pacers | 41 | 41 | .500 | 11 | 26–15 | 15–26 | 15–13 |
| e-Detroit Pistons | 32 | 50 | .390 | 20 | 18-23 | 14–27 | 16–12 |
| e-Cleveland Cavaliers | 30 | 52 | .366 | 22 | 20–21 | 10–31 | 11–17 |
| e-Atlanta Hawks | 25 | 57 | .305 | 27 | 18–23 | 7–34 | 9–19 |
| e-Chicago Bulls | 15 | 67 | .183 | 37 | 10–31 | 5–36 | 4–24 |

Eastern Conference
| # | Team | W | L | PCT | GB |
|---|---|---|---|---|---|
| 1 | c-Philadelphia 76ers | 56 | 26 | .683 | – |
| 2 | y-Milwaukee Bucks | 52 | 30 | .634 | 4 |
| 3 | x-Miami Heat | 50 | 32 | .610 | 6 |
| 4 | x-New York Knicks | 48 | 34 | .585 | 8 |
| 5 | x-Toronto Raptors | 47 | 35 | .573 | 9 |
| 6 | x-Charlotte Hornets | 46 | 36 | .561 | 10 |
| 7 | x-Orlando Magic | 43 | 39 | .524 | 13 |
| 8 | x-Indiana Pacers | 41 | 41 | .500 | 15 |
| 9 | e-Boston Celtics | 36 | 46 | .439 | 20 |
| 10 | e-Detroit Pistons | 32 | 50 | .390 | 24 |
| 11 | e-Cleveland Cavaliers | 30 | 52 | .366 | 26 |
| 12 | e-New Jersey Nets | 26 | 56 | .317 | 30 |
| 13 | e-Atlanta Hawks | 25 | 57 | .305 | 31 |
| 14 | e-Washington Wizards | 19 | 63 | .232 | 37 |
| 15 | e-Chicago Bulls | 15 | 67 | .183 | 42 |

== Player statistics ==
Legend
| GP | Games played | GS | Games started | MPG | Minutes per game |
| FG% | Field-goal percentage | 3P% | 3-point field-goal percentage | FT% | Free-throw percentage |
| RPG | Rebounds per game | APG | Assists per game | SPG | Steals per game |
| BPG | Blocks per game | PPG | Points per game |

== Team Statistics ==
- Points per game: 87.6 (29th of 29)
- Opponent points per game: 96.7 (19th of 29)
- Simple Rating System (SRS): −9.09 (29th of 29)
- Pace: 89.3 (26th of 29)
- Offensive rating: 97.2 (29th of 29)
- Defensive rating: 107.3 (27th of 29)

Net rating: −10.1 (29th of 29)

=== Regular season ===
| Player | GP | GS | MPG | FG% | 3P% | FT% | RPG | APG | SPG | BPG | PPG |
|---|---|---|---|---|---|---|---|---|---|---|---|
| Ron Artest | 76 | 74 | 31.1 | .401 | .291 | .750 | 3.9 | 3.0 | 2.0 | .6 | 11.9 |
| Dalibor Bagarić | 35 | 0 | 7.4 | .262 | .000 | .464 | 1.6 | .3 | .3 | .5 | 1.3 |
| Corey Benjamin | 65 | 5 | 13.2 | .381 | .259 | .675 | 1.5 | 1.1 | .4 | .2 | 4.7 |
| Elton Brand | 74 | 74 | 39.3 | .476 | .000 | .708 | 10.1 | 3.2 | 1.0 | 1.6 | 20.1 |
| Jamal Crawford | 61 | 8 | 17.2 | .352 | .350 | .794 | 1.5 | 2.3 | .7 | .2 | 4.6 |
| Bryce Drew | 48 | 41 | 27.2 | .379 | .381 | .737 | 1.4 | 3.9 | .7 | .1 | 6.3 |
| Khalid El-Amin | 50 | 14 | 18.7 | .370 | .333 | .778 | 1.6 | 2.9 | 1.0 | .0 | 6.3 |
| Marcus Fizer | 72 | 13 | 21.9 | .430 | .256 | .727 | 4.3 | 1.1 | .4 | .3 | 9.5 |
| Steve Goodrich | 12 | 0 | 11.1 | .389 | .333 | .571 | 1.8 | .5 | .2 | .1 | 1.6 |
| A. J. Guyton | 33 | 8 | 19.1 | .406 | .391 | .833 | 1.1 | 1.9 | .3 | .2 | 6.0 |
| Fred Hoiberg | 74 | 37 | 30.4 | .438 | .412 | .866 | 4.2 | 3.6 | 1.3 | .2 | 9.1 |
| Ron Mercer | 61 | 61 | 41.6 | .446 | .304 | .825 | 3.9 | 3.3 | 1.3 | .4 | 19.7 |
| Brad Miller | 57 | 45 | 25.2 | .435 | .200 | .743 | 7.4 | 1.9 | .6 | .7 | 8.9 |
| Michael Ruffin | 45 | 16 | 19.5 | .444 | | .506 | 5.8 | .9 | .7 | .8 | 2.6 |
| Dragan Tarlać | 43 | 12 | 13.9 | .394 | | .758 | 2.8 | .7 | .2 | .4 | 2.4 |
| Jake Voskuhl | 16 | 2 | 8.9 | .440 | | .571 | 2.1 | .3 | .3 | .4 | 1.9 |

Player statistics citation:

== Transactions ==
- August 1, 2000
- Signed Ron Mercer as a free agent.
- August 16, 2000
- Signed Dragan Tarlać.
- September 7, 2000
- Signed Brad Miller as a free agent.
- September 19, 2000
- Waived Hersey Hawkins.
- September 20, 2000
- Released Chris Anstey. Released B.J. Armstrong.
- September 28, 2000
- Traded a 2005 2nd-round draft pick (Robert Whaley was later selected) and a 2006 2nd-round draft pick (Dee Brown was later selected) to the Houston Rockets for Bryce Drew.
- October 2, 2000
- Signed Steve Goodrich as a free agent.
- October 30, 2000
- Waived Steve Goodrich.
- March 20, 2001
- Waived Khalid El-Amin.
- June 14, 2001
- Traded Roberto Duenas to the Charlotte Hornets for a 2001 2nd-round draft pick (Sean Lampley was later selected).
- June 27, 2001

Drafted Eddy Curry in the 1st round (4th pick) of the 2001 NBA Draft.

Drafted Trenton Hassell in the 2nd round (30th pick) of the 2001 NBA Draft.

Drafted Sean Lampley in the 2nd round (45th pick) of the 2001 NBA Draft.

Traded Elton Brand to the Los Angeles Clippers for Tyson Chandler and Brian Skinner.

== Awards and records ==
- Marcus Fizer, NBA All-Rookie Team 2nd Team

== See also ==
- 2000–01 NBA season
