= 2000–01 Cleveland Cavaliers season =

NBA professional basketball team season

- Head coach: Randy Wittman
- Arena: Gund Arena

Results
- Record: 30–52 (.366)
- Place: Division: 6th (Central); Conference: 11th (Eastern)
- Playoff finish: Did not qualify
- Stats at Basketball Reference

Local media
- Television: Fox Sports Net Ohio · WUAB
- Radio: WTAM

The 2000–01 Cleveland Cavaliers season was the 31st season for the Cleveland Cavaliers in the National Basketball Association.

== Season summary ==
=== Off-season ===
The Cavaliers received the eighth overall pick in the 2000 NBA draft, and selected shooting guard Jamal Crawford from the University of Michigan; however, the team soon traded Crawford to the Chicago Bulls in exchange for rookie center, and first-round draft pick Chris Mihm from the University of Texas at Austin. During the off-season, the team acquired Chris Gatling and Clarence Weatherspoon from the Miami Heat in a three-team trade, acquired Matt Harpring from the Orlando Magic, acquired Robert Traylor from the Milwaukee Bucks, and signed free agent Bimbo Coles.

=== Regular season ===
With the addition of Gatling, Weatherspoon, Harpring and Mihm, the Cavaliers got off to a strong start winning nine of their first twelve games of the regular season, on their way to a solid 15–7 start to the season. In January, the team traded Brevin Knight to the Atlanta Hawks in exchange for former Ohio State University star Jim Jackson. However, the Cavaliers struggled losing 23 of their next 28 games, which included a 10-game losing streak between January and February, and held a 20–27 record at the All-Star break. The Cavaliers finished in sixth place in the Central Division with a disappointing 30–52 record.

Second-year star Andre Miller averaged 15.8 points, 8.0 assists and 1.5 steals per game, while Lamond Murray averaged 12.8 points per game, and Weatherspoon provided the team with 11.3 points, 9.7 rebounds and 1.3 blocks per game. In addition, Zydrunas Ilgauskas contributed 11.7 points, 6.7 rebounds and 1.5 blocks per game, but only played just 24 games due to continuing foot injuries, while Gatling provided with 11.4 points and 5.3 rebounds per game, Harpring contributed 11.1 points per game, and Jackson provided with 10.3 points per game in 39 games after the trade. Meanwhile, Mihm averaged 7.6 points and 4.7 rebounds per game, and was named to the NBA All-Rookie Second Team, Wesley Person contributed 7.1 points per game, second-year guard Trajan Langdon contributed 6.0 points per game, Traylor averaged 5.7 points and 4.3 rebounds per game, and Coles provided with 4.9 points and 2.9 assists per game.

During the NBA All-Star weekend at the MCI Center in Washington, D.C., Miller was selected for the NBA Rookie Challenge Game, as a member of the Sophomores team, while Langdon participated in the NBA 2Ball Competition, along with Eva Nemcova of the WNBA's Cleveland Rockers. The Cavaliers finished 16th in the NBA in home-game attendance, with an attendance of 650,775 at the Gund Arena during the regular season.

=== Aftermath ===
Following the season, Randy Wittman was fired as head coach after two seasons with the Cavaliers, while Gatling was traded back to the Miami Heat in a three-team trade, and Jackson signed as a free agent with the Heat during the following season. Meanwhile, Weatherspoon signed with the New York Knicks, and Harpring was traded along with Traylor to the Philadelphia 76ers, who then sent Traylor to the Charlotte Hornets.

== Draft picks ==
Round	Pick	Player	Position	Nationality	School/Club team
1	8	Jamal Crawford	Guard	United States	Michigan

- Crawford traded on draft day to Chicago for #7 pick Chris Mihm. Chicago traded the rights to C Chris Mihm to Cleveland for the rights to G Jamal Crawford and cash.
- 2nd round pick (#37) traded to Denver in Greg Graham deal. Sent to Miami in Mark Strickland deal. Used to draft Eddie House.

== Roster ==
2000–01 Cleveland Cavaliers roster
Players

Pos.	No.	Player	Height	Weight	DOB	From
F	52	Chucky Brown	6 ft 7 in (2.01 m)	214 lb (97 kg)	1968–02–29	NC State
G	50	Bimbo Coles (injured)	6 ft 1 in (1.85 m)	180 lb (82 kg)	1968–04–22	Virginia Tech
F	32	Chris Gatling	6 ft 10 in (2.08 m)	220 lb (100 kg)	1967–09–03	Old Dominion
G	15	Matt Harpring	6 ft 7 in (2.01 m)	230 lb (104 kg)	1976–05–31	Georgia Tech
F	45	Cedric Henderson (injured)	6 ft 7 in (2.01 m)	215 lb (98 kg)	1975–03–11	Memphis
C	11	Zydrunas Ilgauskas (injured)	7 ft 3 in (2.21 m)	238 lb (108 kg)	1975–06–05	Lithuania
F	2	Jim Jackson	6 ft 6 in (1.98 m)	220 lb (100 kg)	1970–10–14	Ohio State
G	10	Anthony Johnson	6 ft 3 in (1.91 m)	200 lb (91 kg)	1974–10–02	College of Charleston
G	21	Trajan Langdon	6 ft 3 in (1.91 m)	210 lb (95 kg)	1976–05–13	Duke
C	4	Chris Mihm	7 ft 0 in (2.13 m)	265 lb (120 kg)	1979–07–16	Texas
G	24	Andre Miller	6 ft 2 in (1.88 m)	200 lb (91 kg)	1976–03–19	Utah
F	30	Lamond Murray	6 ft 7 in (2.01 m)	236 lb (107 kg)	1973–04–20	California
G	1	Wesley Person	6 ft 6 in (1.98 m)	195 lb (88 kg)	1971–03–28	Auburn
F	54	Robert Traylor	6 ft 8 in (2.03 m)	290 lb (132 kg)	1977–02–01	Michigan
F	35	Clarence Weatherspoon	6 ft 6 in (1.98 m)	240 lb (109 kg)	1970–09–08	Southern Miss

Coaches
Head coach
- Randy Wittman
Assistant(s)
- Bob Ociepka
- Keith Smart
- Mike Woodson

Legend
- (DP) Unsigned draft pick
- (FA) Free agent
- (S) Suspended
- Injured

Roster
Updated: January 29, 2001

== Regular season ==
=== Standings ===
Central Division	W	L	PCT	GB	Home	Road	Div
y-Milwaukee Bucks	52	30	.634	–	31–10	21–20	19–9
x-Toronto Raptors	47	35	.573	5	27–14	20–21	18–10
x-Charlotte Hornets	46	36	.561	6	28–13	18–23	20–8
x-Indiana Pacers	41	41	.500	11	26–15	15–26	15–13
e-Detroit Pistons	32	50	.390	20	18-23	14–27	16–12
e-Cleveland Cavaliers	30	52	.366	22	20–21	10–31	11–17
e-Atlanta Hawks	25	57	.305	27	18–23	7–34	9–19
e-Chicago Bulls	15	67	.183	37	10–31	5–36	4–24

Eastern Conference
#	Team	W	L	PCT	GB
1	c-Philadelphia 76ers	56	26	.683	–
2	y-Milwaukee Bucks	52	30	.634	4
3	x-Miami Heat	50	32	.610	6
4	x-New York Knicks	48	34	.585	8
5	x-Toronto Raptors	47	35	.573	9
6	x-Charlotte Hornets	46	36	.561	10
7	x-Orlando Magic	43	39	.524	13
8	x-Indiana Pacers	41	41	.500	15
9	e-Boston Celtics	36	46	.439	20
10	e-Detroit Pistons	32	50	.390	24
11	e-Cleveland Cavaliers	30	52	.366	26
12	e-New Jersey Nets	26	56	.317	30
13	e-Atlanta Hawks	25	57	.305	31
14	e-Washington Wizards	19	63	.232	37
15	e-Chicago Bulls	15	67	.183	42

== Game log ==
=== October ===
Record: 1-0; Home: 0-0; Road: 1–0

#	Date	Visitor	Score	Home	Location/Attendance	Record
1	October 31, 2000	Cleveland	86-82 W	New Jersey	Continental Airlines Arena 14,505	1–0

=== November ===
Record: 8-5; Home: 6-1; Road: 2–4

#	Date	Visitor	Score	Home	Location/Attendance	Record
2	November 1, 2000	Sacramento	102-100 W in 2OT	Cleveland	Gund Arena 17,695	2–0
3	November 4, 2000	Boston	91-89 W	Cleveland	Gund Arena 18,392	3–0
4	November 8, 2000	Cleveland	99-97 W	New York	Madison Square Garden 19,763	4–0
5	November 10, 2000	Cleveland	88-115 L	Toronto	Air Canada Centre 19,800	4–1
6	November 11, 2000	Washington	86-73 W	Cleveland	Gund Arena 17,336	5–1
7	November 14, 2000	Golden State	96-86 W	Cleveland	Gund Arena 13,691	6–1
8	November 15, 2000	Cleveland	98-107 L	Philadelphia	First Union Center 16,328	6–2
9	November 17, 2000	Cleveland	76-89 L	Milwaukee	Bradley Center 13,874	6–3
10	November 21, 2000	Detroit	117-98 W	Cleveland	Gund Arena 12,683	7–3
11	November 22, 2000	Cleveland	86-67 W	Miami	AmericanAirlines Arena 14,755	8–3
12	November 24, 2000	Miami	85-80 W	Cleveland	Gund Arena 20,562	9–3
13	November 25, 2000	Cleveland	98-109 L	Charlotte	Charlotte Coliseum 13,791	9–4
14	November 28, 2000	Boston	72-87 L	Cleveland	Gund Arena 14,879	9–5

=== December ===
Record: 7-7; Home: 4-2; Road: 3–5

#	Date	Visitor	Score	Home	Location/Attendance	Record
15	December 1, 2000	Cleveland	93-103 L	Detroit	The Palace of Auburn Hills 15,323	9–6
16	December 2, 2000	Philadelphia	78-112 L	Cleveland	Gund Arena 20,562	9–7
17	December 5, 2000	Charlotte	71-66 W	Cleveland	Gund Arena 14,544	10–7
18	December 6, 2000	Cleveland	92-88 W	Chicago	United Center 21,395	11–7
19	December 9, 2000	Atlanta	97-90 W	Cleveland	Gund Arena 15,766	12–7
20	December 12, 2000	Dallas	92-87 W	Cleveland	Gund Arena 12,577	13–7
21	December 15, 2000	Cleveland	103-95 W	Indiana	Conseco Fieldhouse 16,966	14–7
22	December 16, 2000	Utah	99-92 W	Cleveland	Gund Arena 18,571	15–7
23	December 20, 2000	Cleveland	77-94 L	San Antonio	Alamodome 17,336	15–8
24	December 22, 2000	Cleveland	95-103 L	Miami	AmericanAirlines Arena 15,854	15–9
25	December 23, 2000	Cleveland	92-111 L	Orlando	TD Waterhouse Centre 14,160	15–10
26	December 26, 2000	Cleveland	110-115 L in OT	Charlotte	Charlotte Coliseum 14,442	15–11
27	December 28, 2000	Milwaukee	89-107 L	Cleveland	Gund Arena 18,225	15–12
28	December 29, 2000	Cleveland	97-85 W	Atlanta	Philips Arena 11,680	16–12

=== January ===
Record: 4-11; Home: 3-4; Road: 1–7

#	Date	Visitor	Score	Home	Location/Attendance	Record
29	January 2, 2001	Houston	95-100 L	Cleveland	Gund Arena 14,032	16–13
30	January 3, 2001	Cleveland	83-88 L	Milwaukee	Bradley Center 13,817	16–14
31	January 6, 2001	Philadelphia	103-107 L	Cleveland	Gund Arena 20,562	16–15
32	January 8, 2001	New Jersey	92-90 W	Cleveland	Gund Arena 12,332	17–15
33	January 10, 2001	Cleveland	103-108 L	Sacramento	ARCO Arena 17,317	17–16
34	January 12, 2001	Cleveland	98-101 L	L.A. Lakers	STAPLES Center 18,997	17-17
35	January 13, 2001	Cleveland	107-119 L	Vancouver	General Motors Place 12,540	17–18
36	January 15, 2001	Cleveland	107-101 W	Golden State	The Arena in Oakland 15,289	18-18
37	January 16, 2001	Cleveland	83-103 L	Portland	Rose Garden Arena 19,980	18–19
38	January 19, 2001	Cleveland	88-91 L	Denver	Pepsi Center 17,058	18–20
39	January 22, 2001	Portland	84-58 W	Cleveland	Gund Arena 16,388	19–20
40	January 24, 2001	Chicago	94-86 W	Cleveland	Gund Arena 15,503	20-20
41	January 27, 2001	Atlanta	90-101 L	Cleveland	Gund Arena 20,562	20–21
42	January 29, 2001	Cleveland	89-95 L	Washington	MCI Center 12,721	20–22
43	January 30, 2001	L.A. Lakers	96-102 L	Cleveland	Gund Arena 20,053	20–23

=== February ===
Record: 2–10; Home: 1–6; Road: 1–4

#	Date	Visitor	Score	Home	Location/Attendance	Record
44	February 1, 2001	Minnesota	81-90 L	Cleveland	Gund Arena 13,904	20–24
45	February 3, 2001	Detroit	81-88 L in OT	Cleveland	Gund Arena 19,635	20–25
46	February 4, 2001	Cleveland	82-103 L	Boston	FleetCenter 14,638	20–26
47	February 7, 2001	San Antonio	89-107 L	Cleveland	Gund Arena 13,324	20–27

=== March ===
Record:; Home:; Road:

#	Date	Visitor	Score	Home	Location/Attendance	Record

=== April ===
Record:; Home:; Road:

#	Date	Visitor	Score	Home	Location/Attendance	Record

== Player stats ==
Legend
GP	Games played	GS	Games started	MPG	Minutes per game
FG%	Field-goal percentage	3P%	3-point field-goal percentage	FT%	Free-throw percentage
RPG	Rebounds per game	APG	Assists per game	SPG	Steals per game
BPG	Blocks per game	PPG	Points per game

=== Regular season ===
Player	GP	GS	MPG	FG%	3P%	FT%	RPG	APG	SPG	BPG	PPG
Andre Miller	82	82	34.7	45.2	26.6	83.3	4.4	8.0	1.5	0.3	15.8
Lamond Murray	78	46	28.5	42.3	37.0	73.5	4.4	1.6	1.1	0.3	12.8
Zydrunas Ilgauskas	24	24	25.7	48.7	0.0	67.9	6.7	0.8	0.6	1.5	11.7
Chris Gatling	74	6	22.6	44.9	30.4	68.4	5.3	0.8	0.7	0.4	11.4
Clarence Weatherspoon	82	82	33.8	50.1	0.0	79.0	9.7	1.3	1.0	1.3	11.3
Matt Harpring	56	55	28.8	45.4	25.0	81.2	4.3	1.8	0.8	0.3	11.1
Jim Jackson	39	26	29.2	39.0	23.8	78.6	3.7	2.9	0.9	0.2	10.3
Chris Mihm	59	43	19.8	44.2	0.0	79.4	4.7	0.3	0.3	0.9	7.6
Wesley Person	44	22	21.8	43.8	40.5	80.0	3.0	1.5	0.6	0.3	7.1
Trajan Langdon	65	5	17.2	43.1	41.1	89.5	1.4	1.2	0.6	0.1	6.0
Robert Traylor	70	7	17.3	49.7	0.0	56.7	4.3	0.9	0.7	1.1	5.7
Bimbo Coles	47	0	17.1	38.1	12.5	85.7	1.0	2.9	0.6	0.1	4.9
Cedric Henderson	55	10	17.5	38.9	12.5	65.2	1.6	1.4	0.5	0.4	4.3
Chucky Brown	20	2	13.3	41.3	0.0	66.7	1.8	0.3	0.3	0.3	3.9
Anthony Johnson	28	0	8.3	33.3	50.0	68.8	0.8	1.6	0.2	0.0	2.4
J.R. Reid	6	0	6.5	40.0	0.0	75.0	1.3	0.2	0.3	0.2	1.7
Brevin Knight	6	0	15.5	13.3	0.0	83.3	1.2	4.2	1.0	0.2	1.5
Etdrick Bohannon	6	0	3.2	50.0	0.0	100.0	1.2	0.0	0.0	0.3	1.3
Michael Hawkins	10	0	7.6	33.3	50.0	0.0	0.5	1.3	0.2	0.0	0.8
Larry Robinson	1	0	1.0	0.0	0.0	0.0	0.0	0.0	0.0	0.0	0.0

Player statistics citation:
