= 2000–01 Philadelphia 76ers season =

NBA professional basketball team season

- Conference champions
- Division champions
- Head coach: Larry Brown
- General manager: Billy King
- Owners: Comcast Spectacor
- Arena: First Union Center

Results
- Record: 56–26 (.683)
- Place: Division: 1st (Atlantic); Conference: 1st (Eastern)
- Playoff finish: NBA Finals (lost to Lakers 1–4)
- Stats at Basketball Reference

Local media
- Television: WPSG; Comcast SportsNet Philadelphia
- Radio: WIP

The 2000–01 Philadelphia 76ers season was the 52nd season for the Philadelphia 76ers in the National Basketball Association, and their 38th season in Philadelphia, Pennsylvania.

== Season summary ==
=== Off-season ===
For the season, the 76ers slightly updated their white home uniforms and black road uniforms, widening the top of the jerseys next to the V-shaped collar. The team nickname "Sixers" was changed from bronze to black on the front of their home jerseys, while the red outline surrounding the team nickname was removed from the front of their road jerseys. The team's redesigned uniforms would remain in use until 2007.

=== Regular season ===
The 76ers won their first ten games of the regular season, and later on held a 36–14 record at the All-Star break. At mid-season, the team traded Theo Ratliff, Toni Kukoč, and Nazr Mohammed to the Atlanta Hawks in exchange for All-Star center Dikembe Mutombo. However, prior to the trade, Ratliff was sidelined due to a season-ending wrist injury after 50 games; before the trade, Ratliff averaged 12.4 points, 8.3 rebounds and 3.7 blocks per game. The 76ers finished in first place in the Atlantic Division with a 56–26 record, which earned them the first seed in the Eastern Conference; it was the team's first 50-win season since 1989–90, and also their best regular season record since 1984–85. Head coach Larry Brown was named the NBA Coach of the Year, after leading the 76ers to a seven-game improvement over the previous season. The 76ers had the fifth best team defensive rating in the NBA.

All-Star guard Allen Iverson averaged 31.1 points, 4.6 assists and 2.5 steals per game, leading the league in both scoring and steals; he was named to the All-NBA First Team, and was named the NBA Most Valuable Player of the Year for his accomplishments, beating Tim Duncan and Shaquille O'Neal by a wide margin. In addition, Mutombo averaged 11.7 points, 12.4 rebounds and 2.5 blocks per game in 26 games after the trade, and was named the NBA Defensive Player of the Year for the fourth time, and was also named to the All-NBA Second Team and to the NBA All-Defensive First Team, while Aaron McKie provided the team with 11.6 points, 5.0 assists and 1.4 steals per game, and was named the NBA Sixth Man of the Year. Meanwhile, Tyrone Hill provided with 9.6 points and 9.0 rebounds per game, Eric Snow contributed 9.8 points, 7.5 assists and 1.5 steals per game, but only played just 50 games due to a stress fracture in his right ankle, and George Lynch averaged 8.4 points and 7.2 rebounds per game.

During the NBA All-Star weekend at the MCI Center in Washington, D.C., and before the mid-season trade, Iverson and Ratliff were both selected for the 2001 NBA All-Star Game, as members of the Eastern Conference All-Star team, while Brown was selected to coach the Eastern Conference, although Ratliff did not participate due to injury; it was his first and only All-Star selection. Iverson scored 25 points along with 5 assists and 4 steals, and was named the NBA All-Star Game Most Valuable Player, as the Eastern Conference defeated the Western Conference, 111–110.

However, this season was not without controversy. With Ratliff out for the remainder of the regular season due to his wrist injury, the 76ers only had two other centers on their roster, Matt Geiger, and second-year player Todd MacCulloch; the team then traded Ratliff along with Kukoč, and Mohammed to the Hawks in exchange for Mutombo. By trading Kukoč, who was not included in the original proposed deal, and who also won three NBA championships with Phil Jackson as his head coach during his tenure with the Chicago Bulls, the 76ers had only one other player on the roster who had NBA Finals experience, Snow, who played a total of 24 minutes in 10 games in the 1996 NBA playoffs as a reserve for the Seattle SuperSonics. At one point, the team's record was 42–14, but finished 14–12 the rest of the way, including a five-game losing streak in March.

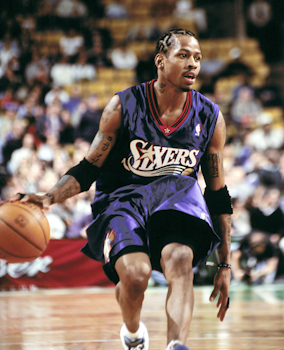
Allen Iverson won the NBA Most Valuable Player Award for the season.

In the final game of the regular season, against the Chicago Bulls at the First Union Center on April 18, 2001, Brown rested his starters instead of trying to go for a win, as the 76ers lost to the Bulls by a score of 92–86; had the 76ers won this game, they would have had the league's second-best record behind the San Antonio Spurs, and home court advantage over the Los Angeles Lakers in the NBA Finals. Both teams had the same record, but the Lakers' record for non-conference opponents was better than Philadelphia's.

The 76ers finished fifth in the NBA in home-game attendance, with an attendance of 805,692 at the First Union Center during the regular season.

=== NBA playoffs ===
In the Eastern Conference First Round of the 2001 NBA playoffs, and for the third consecutive year, the 76ers faced off against the 8th–seeded Indiana Pacers, a team that featured Jalen Rose, All-Star guard Reggie Miller, and Jermaine O'Neal. The 76ers lost Game 1 to the Pacers at home, 79–78 at the First Union Center. However, the team managed to win the next three games, which included a Game 4 win over the Pacers on the road, 88–85 at the Conseco Fieldhouse to win the series in four games.

In the Eastern Conference Semi-finals, the team faced off against the 5th–seeded Toronto Raptors, who were led by All-Star guard Vince Carter, All-Star center Antonio Davis, and Charles Oakley. With the series tied at 1–1, the 76ers lost Game 3 to the Raptors on the road, 102–78 at the Air Canada Centre, as the Raptors took a 2–1 series lead. The 76ers managed to win the next two games, including a Game 5 win over the Raptors at the First Union Center, 121–88, in which Iverson scored 52 points and made 8 out of 14 three-point field-goal attempts. However, the team lost Game 6 to the Raptors at the Air Canada Centre, 101–89. With the series tied at 3–3, the 76ers won Game 7 over the Raptors at the First Union Center, 88–87 to win in a hard-fought seven-game series.

In the Eastern Conference Finals, the 76ers then faced off against the 2nd–seeded, and Central Division champion Milwaukee Bucks, who were led by the trio of All-Star guard Ray Allen, All-Star forward Glenn Robinson, and Sam Cassell. The 76ers won Game 1 over the Bucks at the First Union Center, 93–85, but then lost the next two games as the Bucks took a 2–1 series lead; Iverson sat out Game 3 due to a left hip injury, in which he sustained during the second-round series against the Raptors, as the 76ers lost to the Bucks on the road, 80–74 at the Bradley Center. With the return of Iverson, the 76ers managed to win the next two games before losing Game 6 to the Bucks at the Bradley Center, 110–100, despite a 46-point performance from Iverson. With the series tied at 3–3, the 76ers won Game 7 over the Bucks at the First Union Center, 108–91 to win in another hard-fought seven-game series, and advance to the NBA Finals for the first time since the 1982–83 season.

In the 2001 NBA Finals, the 76ers faced off against the 2nd–seeded, and defending NBA champion Lakers, who were led by All-Star center Shaquille O'Neal, All-Star guard Kobe Bryant, and Derek Fisher. The 76ers won Game 1 over the Lakers on the road in overtime, 107–101 at the Staples Center, in which Iverson scored 48 points along with 5 steals. However, the 76ers lost Game 2 to the Lakers on the road by a score of 98–89, before losing their next three home games at the First Union Center, including a Game 5 loss to the Lakers by a score of 108–96; the 76ers lost the series in five games, as the Lakers won their second consecutive NBA championship.

=== Aftermath ===
Following the season, Hill was traded along with second-year forward Jumaine Jones back to his former team, the Cleveland Cavaliers, and Lynch was traded to the Charlotte Hornets. This would be the final season in which the 76ers won the Atlantic Division title, and clinched the #1 seed in the Eastern Conference playoffs until the 2020–21 COVID-19 pandemic-shortened season.

== Offseason ==
During the off-season, the 76ers were not involved in any trades. In the 2000 NBA draft, they drafted guard Speedy Claxton and swingman Mark Karcher. Claxton missed the entire season due to a knee injury, while Karcher would be waived on October 18. Karcher would not play any games in the NBA.

Their first transaction was made on August 17, when they signed Jermaine Jackson. Jackson almost made the team, but he was waived one day before the team's season opener.

On October 2, the 76ers signed Ademola Okulaja and Pepe Sánchez. Okulaja was on the team's roster, but did not play in any regular season games. He was waived on December 19. Sánchez played 19 games with the 76ers before being traded to the Atlanta Hawks with Toni Kukoč, Nazr Mohammed, and Theo Ratliff for Roshown McLeod and Dikembe Mutombo on February 22. Sánchez played 5 games with Atlanta before being waived on March 12. Three days later, Sánchez would once again sign with the 76res.

On October 28, the 76ers signed Vernon Maxwell, who previously played for the team during the 1995–96 season. Maxwell would play in 24 games with the 76ers before being waived on December 22.

=== NBA draft ===
Round	Pick	Player	Position	Nationality	College
1	20	Craig "Speedy" Claxton	PG	United States	Hofstra
2	48	Mark Karcher	SG/SF	United States	Temple

== Roster ==
2000–01 Philadelphia 76ers roster
Players

Pos.	No.	Player	Height	Weight	DOB	From
G	11	Raja Bell	6 ft 5 in (1.96 m)	204 lb (93 kg)	1976–09–19	FIU
G/F	23	Rodney Buford	6 ft 5 in (1.96 m)	189 lb (86 kg)	1977–11–02	Creighton
G	12	Speedy Claxton	5 ft 11 in (1.80 m)	166 lb (75 kg)	1978–05–08	Hofstra
C	52	Matt Geiger	7 ft 0 in (2.13 m)	243 lb (110 kg)	1969–09–10	Georgia Tech
F/C	40	Tyrone Hill	6 ft 9 in (2.06 m)	240 lb (109 kg)	1968–03–19	Xavier
G	3	Allen Iverson	6 ft 0 in (1.83 m)	165 lb (75 kg)	1975–06–07	Georgetown
F	33	Jumaine Jones	6 ft 8 in (2.03 m)	218 lb (99 kg)	1979–02–10	Georgia
F	9	George Lynch	6 ft 8 in (2.03 m)	218 lb (99 kg)	1970–09–03	North Carolina
C	50	Todd MacCulloch	7 ft 0 in (2.13 m)	280 lb (127 kg)	1976–01–27	Washington
G/F	8	Aaron McKie	6 ft 5 in (1.96 m)	209 lb (95 kg)	1972–10–02	Temple
F	7	Roshown McLeod	6 ft 8 in (2.03 m)	221 lb (100 kg)	1975–11–17	Duke
C	55	Dikembe Mutombo	7 ft 2 in (2.18 m)	245 lb (111 kg)	1966–06–25	Georgetown
G	5	Kevin Ollie	6 ft 4 in (1.93 m)	195 lb (88 kg)	1972–12–27	Connecticut
G	4	Pepe Sánchez	6 ft 4 in (1.93 m)	195 lb (88 kg)	1977–05–08	Temple
G	20	Eric Snow	6 ft 3 in (1.91 m)	190 lb (86 kg)	1973–04–24	Michigan State

Coaches
Head coach
- Larry Brown
Assistant(s)
- Randy Ayers
- John Kuester

Legend
- (DP) Unsigned draft pick
- (FA) Free agent
- (S) Suspended
- Injured

Roster
Updated: April 6, 2001

=== Roster Notes ===
- Rookie point guard Speedy Claxton was on the injured reserve list due to a knee injury, and missed the entire regular season.

== Regular season ==
=== Season standings ===
Atlantic Division	W	L	PCT	GB	Home	Road	Div
y-Philadelphia 76ers	56	26	.683	–	29–12	27–14	18–6
x-Miami Heat	50	32	.610	6	29–12	21–20	15–10
x-New York Knicks	48	34	.585	8	30–11	18–23	16–9
x-Orlando Magic	43	39	.524	13	26–15	17–24	14–10
e-Boston Celtics	36	46	.439	20	20–21	16–25	11–13
e-New Jersey Nets	26	56	.317	30	18–23	8–33	8–16
e-Washington Wizards	19	63	.232	37	12–29	7–34	3–21

Eastern Conference
#	Team	W	L	PCT	GB
1	c-Philadelphia 76ers	56	26	.683	–
2	y-Milwaukee Bucks	52	30	.634	4
3	x-Miami Heat	50	32	.610	6
4	x-New York Knicks	48	34	.585	8
5	x-Toronto Raptors	47	35	.573	9
6	x-Charlotte Hornets	46	36	.561	10
7	x-Orlando Magic	43	39	.524	13
8	x-Indiana Pacers	41	41	.500	15
9	e-Boston Celtics	36	46	.439	20
10	e-Detroit Pistons	32	50	.390	24
11	e-Cleveland Cavaliers	30	52	.366	26
12	e-New Jersey Nets	26	56	.317	30
13	e-Atlanta Hawks	25	57	.305	31
14	e-Washington Wizards	19	63	.232	37
15	e-Chicago Bulls	15	67	.183	42

z – clinched division title
y – clinched division title
x – clinched playoff spot

== Game log ==
=== Regular season ===
2000–01 game log
Total: 56–26 (home: 29–12; road: 27–14)
October: 1–0 (home: 0–0; road: 1–0)

Game	Date	Team	Score	High points	High rebounds	High assists	Location Attendance	Record
1	October 31	@ New York	W 101–72	Allen Iverson (25)	George Lynch (11)	Allen Iverson (9)	Madison Square Garden; 19,763	1–0

November: 11–2 (home: 6–0; road: 5–2)

Game	Date	Team	Score	High points	High rebounds	High assists	Location Attendance	Record
2	November 1	Toronto	W 104–98	Allen Iverson (24)	Tyrone Hill (10)	Eric Snow (8)	First Union Center; 19,817	2–0
3	November 3	@ Orlando	W 87–80	Allen Iverson (29)	Theo Ratliff (17)	Eric Snow (7)	TD Waterhouse Centre; 14,233	3–0
4	November 4	@ Miami	W 84–82	Allen Iverson (23)	Tyrone Hill (8)	Eric Snow (6)	American Airlines Arena; 16,029	4–0
5	November 8	Detroit	W 103–94	Allen Iverson (28)	Theo Ratliff (8)	Allen Iverson (8)	First Union Center; 15,986	5–0
6	November 9	@ Minnesota	W 84–82	Eric Snow (22)	Theo Ratliff (14)	Allen Iverson (5)	Target Center; 16,119	6–0
7	November 11	Boston	W 85–83	Eric Snow (25)	George Lynch (13)	Allen Iverson (7)	First Union Center; 19,258	7–0
8	November 15	Cleveland	W 107–98	George Lynch (23)	Ratliff, McKie (5)	Eric Snow (7)	First Union Center; 16,328	8–0
9	November 17	Miami	W 94–73	Allen Iverson (19)	Tyrone Hill (9)	Aaron McKie (6)	First Union Center; 20,720	9–0
10	November 20	@ Boston	W 114–90	Allen Iverson (26)	Matt Geiger (9)	Eric Snow (12)	FleetCenter; 15,209	10–0
11	November 22	@ Charlotte	L 73–88	Snow, Geiger, Maxwell (10)	Matt Geiger (8)	Eric Snow (5)	Charlotte Coliseum; 15,306	10–1
12	November 24	@ Atlanta	W 76–67	Allen Iverson (21)	Theo Ratliff (14)	Eric Snow (4)	Philips Arena; 17,601	11–1
13	November 25	@ San Antonio	L 76–96	Allen Iverson (21)	Tyrone Hill (9)	Eric Snow (3)	Alamodome; 33,046	11–2
14	November 29	Washington	W 93–87	Allen Iverson (29)	Tyrone Hill (10)	Eric Snow (9)	First Union Center; 16,263	12–2

December: 9–6 (home: 1–4; road: 8–2)

Game	Date	Team	Score	High points	High rebounds	High assists	Location Attendance	Record
15	December 1	Charlotte	W 95–74	Allen Iverson (37)	Allen Iverson (10)	Eric Snow (9)	First Union Center; 18,377	13–2
16	December 2	@ Cleveland	W 112–78	Allen Iverson (27)	Allen Iverson (7)	Eric Snow (11)	Gund Arena; 20,562	14–2
17	December 4	@ Denver	L 98–105	Allen Iverson (37)	Allen Iverson (9)	Eric Snow (9)	Pepsi Center; 15,129	14–3
18	December 5	@ L.A. Lakers	L 85–96	Allen Iverson (27)	Eric Snow (8)	Eric Snow (6)	Staples Center; 18,997	14–4
19	December 8	@ Portland	W 107–94	Allen Iverson (30)	Ratliff, McKie (10)	Allen Iverson (10)	Rose Garden Arena; 20,113	15–4
20	December 9	@ Vancouver	W 83–79	Allen Iverson (18)	Theo Ratliff (10)	Aaron McKie (5)	General Motors Place; 15,671	16–4
21	December 11	Minnesota	L 91–96 (OT)	Allen Iverson (26)	Tyrone Hill (13)	Allen Iverson (7)	First Union Center; 18,707	16–5
22	December 13	@ Washington	W 102–82	Allen Iverson (25)	Theo Ratliff (13)	Aaron McKie (6)	MCI Center; 14,923	17–5
23	December 15	Dallas	L 94–112	Allen Iverson (26)	Theo Ratliff (9)	George Lynch (4)	First Union Center; 18,563	17–6
24	December 16	@ Chicago	W 99–91	Allen Iverson (33)	Todd MacCulloch (13)	Allen Iverson (8)	United Center; 22,110	18–6
25	December 20	Utah	L 89–91	Allen Iverson (45)	Tyrone Hill (12)	Toni Kukoč (4)	First Union Center; 19,428	18–7
26	December 22	New York	L 71–91	Allen Iverson (19)	Ratliff, McKie, Kukoč (6)	Allen Iverson (8)	First Union Center; 20,670	18–8
27	December 26	@ Utah	W 97–91	Aaron McKie (24)	Tyrone Hill (8)	Kevin Ollie (7)	First Union Center; 19,911	19–8
28	December 27	@ Golden State	W 118–110	Allen Iverson (29)	Tyrone Hill (15)	Aaron McKie (7)	The Arena in Oakland; 18,726	20–8
29	December 30	@ Sacramento	W 107–104 (OT)	Allen Iverson (46)	Tyrone Hill (13)	Aaron McKie (14)	ARCO Arena; 17,317	21–8

January: 13–3 (home: 7–2; road: 6–1)

Game	Date	Team	Score	High points	High rebounds	High assists	Location Attendance	Record
30	January 3	Atlanta	W 98–80	Allen Iverson (21)	Ratliff, Hill (11)	Aaron McKie (10)	First Union Center; 17,643	22–8
31	January 5	Seattle	W 121–89	Allen Iverson (41)	Tyrone Hill (11)	Aaron McKie (6)	First Union Center; 20,240	23–8
32	January 6	@ Cleveland	W 107–103	Allen Iverson (54)	Theo Ratliff (9)	Aaron McKie (9)	Gund Arena; 20,562	24–8
33	January 9	@ New Jersey	W 104–87	Allen Iverson (22)	Theo Ratliff (13)	Aaron McKie (7)	Continental Airlines Arena; 13,340	25–8
34	January 10	Portland	L 75–93	Aaron McKie (15)	Hill, Lynch (8)	Aaron McKie (5)	First Union Center; 20,645	25–9
35	January 12	@ Washington	W 86–82	Allen Iverson (29)	Tyrone Hill (20)	Aaron McKie (7)	MCI Center; 20,674	26–9
36	January 13	San Antonio	W 100–83	Allen Iverson (40)	George Lynch (9)	Aaron McKie (10)	First Union Center; 20,607	27–9
37	January 15	Charlotte	W 84–79	Allen Iverson (35)	George Lynch (16)	Allen Iverson (7)	First Union Center; 20,188	28–9
38	January 17	Chicago	W 99–88	Allen Iverson (43)	George Lynch (9)	Aaron McKie (7)	First Union Center; 18,674	29–9
39	January 19	New Jersey	W 97–86	Aaron McKie (21)	Tyrone Hill (10)	Kevin Ollie (9)	First Union Center; 20,249	30–9
40	January 21	Toronto	L 106–110 (OT)	Allen Iverson (51)	Theo Ratliff (13)	Aaron McKie (7)	First Union Center; 20,583	30–10
41	January 23	@ Dallas	W 114–98	Allen Iverson (30)	George Lynch (13)	Aaron McKie (11)	Reunion Arena; 18,187	31–10
42	January 24	@ Houston	W 85–84 (OT)	Allen Iverson (32)	Tyrone Hill (19)	Iverson, McKie, Ollie (3)	Compaq Center; 14,051	32–10
43	January 26	Detroit	W 105–89	Allen Iverson (44)	Hill, Lynch (13)	Aaron McKie (5)	First Union Center; 18,609	33–10
44	January 28	@ Indiana	W 86–81	Allen Iverson (27)	George Lynch (12)	Allen Iverson (8)	Conseco Fieldhouse; 18,345	34–10
45	January 30	@ Toronto	L 89–96	Allen Iverson (38)	Tyrone Hill (14)	Aaron McKie (10)	Air Canada Centre; 19,800	34–11

February: 9–5 (home: 6–3; road: 3–2)

Game	Date	Team	Score	High points	High rebounds	High assists	Location Attendance	Record
46	February 1	@ New York	W 87–80	Allen Iverson (31)	Theo Ratliff (13)	Iverson, McKie (8)	Madison Square Garden; 19,763	35–11
47	February 2	Orlando	L 117–123 (2OT)	Allen Iverson (47)	Theo Ratliff (13)	Allen Iverson (7)	First Union Center; 20,645	35–12
48	February 4	@ New Jersey	L 89–96	Allen Iverson (32)	Theo Ratliff (12)	Aaron McKie (9)	Continental Airlines Arena; 17,764	35–13
49	February 5	Denver	W 99–80	Allen Iverson (37)	Jumaine Jones (9)	Aaron McKie (10)	First Union Center; 18,726	36–13
50	February 7	Houston	L 87–112	Allen Iverson (26)	George Lynch (11)	Aaron McKie (8)	First Union Center; 17,661	36–14
51	February 13	@ Milwaukee	W 107–104	Allen Iverson (49)	Tyrone Hill (16)	Snow, McKie (6)	Bradley Center; 18,717	37–14
52	February 14	L.A. Lakers	W 112–97	Allen Iverson (40)	Hill, MacCulloch (7)	Allen Iverson (9)	First Union Center; 21,005	38–14
53	February 16	L.A. Clippers	W 108–93	Allen Iverson (42)	Tyrone Hill (13)	Eric Snow (8)	First Union Center; 20,592	39–14
54	February 18	Phoenix	W 104–98	Allen Iverson (26)	George Lynch (12)	Eric Snow (8)	First Union Center; 20,781	40–14
55	February 21	Vancouver	W 107–91	Allen Iverson (36)	Tyrone Hill (12)	Eric Snow (7)	First Union Center; 17,944	41–14
56	February 23	@ Detroit	W 99–78	Allen Iverson (43)	Dikembe Mutombo (13)	Eric Snow (6)	The Palace of Auburn Hills; 22,076	42–14
57	February 24	@ Charlotte	L 85–86	Allen Iverson (47)	Tyrone Hill (13)	Eric Snow (8)	Charlotte Coliseum; 19,925	42–15
58	February 26	Milwaukee	L 91–98	Allen Iverson (26)	Dikembe Mutombo (16)	Eric Snow (9)	First Union Center; 20,324	42–16
59	February 28	Miami	W 79–69	Allen Iverson (27)	Dikembe Mutombo (18)	Iverson, Snow, McKie (3)	First Union Center; 20,562	43–16

March: 7–6 (home: 5–2; road: 2–4)

Game	Date	Team	Score	High points	High rebounds	High assists	Location Attendance	Record
60	March 2	Washington	W 107–102	Allen Iverson (41)	Dikembe Mutombo (16)	Eric Snow (11)	First Union Center; 20,257	44–16
61	March 7	New Jersey	W 102–94	Allen Iverson (38)	Tyrone Hill (14)	Eric Snow (8)	First Union Center; 19,930	45–16
62	March 9	Atlanta	W 108–103	Allen Iverson (47)	Dikembe Mutombo (13)	Eric Snow (13)	First Union Center; 20,672	46–16
63	March 11	@ Boston	W 97–91	Eric Snow (19)	Dikembe Mutombo (22)	Eric Snow (10)	FleetCenter; 18,624	47–16
64	March 14	@ Chicago	W 85–67	Tyrone Hill (16)	Dikembe Mutombo (12)	Eric Snow (7)	United Center; 22,835	48–16
65	March 16	Sacramento	L 79–100	Allen Iverson (28)	George Lynch (8)	Eric Snow (7)	First Union Center; 20,866	48–17
66	March 17	@ Milwaukee	L 78–87	Aaron McKie (23)	Hill, Mutombo (10)	Aaron McKie (10)	Bradley Center; 18,717	48–18
67	March 19	@ Seattle	L 89–93	Aaron McKie (21)	George Lynch (13)	Eric Snow (9)	KeyArena; 17,072	48–19
68	March 20	@ L.A. Clippers	L 77–88	Aaron McKie (22)	Aaron McKie (7)	Eric Snow (9)	Staples Center; 19,680	48–20
69	March 23	@ Phoenix	L 71–84	Aaron McKie (20)	Dikembe Mutombo (13)	Aaron McKie (4)	America West Arena; 19,023	48–21
70	March 26	Milwaukee	W 90–78	Allen Iverson (36)	Dikembe Mutombo (17)	Eric Snow (13)	First Union Center; 20,561	49–21
71	March 28	Orlando	L 95–96	Allen Iverson (37)	Tyrone Hill (17)	Eric Snow (10)	First Union Center; 20,683	49–22
72	March 30	Golden State	W 102–89	Allen Iverson (35)	Tyrone Hill (14)	Allen Iverson (9)	First Union Center; 20,958	50–22

April: 6–4 (home: 4–1; road: 2–3)

Game	Date	Team	Score	High points	High rebounds	High assists	Location Attendance	Record
73	April 1	Indiana	W 104–93	Allen Iverson (37)	Tyrone Hill (13)	Eric Snow (9)	First Union Center; 20,690	50–23
74	April 3	@ Toronto	L 85–100	Allen Iverson (18)	Dikembe Mutombo (16)	Eric Snow (8)	Air Canada Centre; 19,800	51–23
75	April 4	@ Detroit	W 90–84	Dikembe Mutombo (21)	Dikembe Mutombo (16)	Eric Snow (7)	The Palace of Auburn Hills; 16,485	52–23
76	April 6	Cleveland	W 96–88	Dikembe Mutombo (27)	Dikembe Mutombo (13)	Kevin Ollie (10)	First Union Center; 20,767	53–23
77	April 9	Boston	W 108–95	Allen Iverson (37)	Dikembe Mutombo (19)	Eric Snow (9)	First Union Center; 20,365	54–23
78	April 10	@ Miami	L 81–83	Allen Iverson (41)	Dikembe Mutombo (12)	Eric Snow (7)	American Airlines Arena; 20,098	54–24
79	April 12	@ Orlando	L 77–101	Tyrone Hill (16)	Matt Geiger (7)	Eric Snow (9)	TD Waterhouse Centre; 17,248	54–25
80	April 15	New York	W 89–82	Allen Iverson (27)	Dikembe Mutombo (16)	Aaron McKie (9)	First Union Center; 20,699	55–25
81	April 17	@ Indiana	W 111–105 (OT)	Jumaine Jones (26)	Jumaine Jones (13)	Eric Snow (8)	Conseco Fieldhouse; 18,345	56–25
82	April 18	Chicago	L 86–92	Todd MacCulloch (21)	Geiger, Lynch (9)	Eric Snow (9)	First Union Center; 19,449	56–26

2000–01 schedule

=== Playoffs ===
2001 playoff game log
First Round: 3–1 (home: 1–1; road: 2–0)

Game	Date	Team	Score	High points	High rebounds	High assists	Location Attendance	Series
1	April 21	Indiana	L 78–79	Aaron McKie (18)	Dikembe Mutombo (22)	Iverson, McKie (7)	First Union Center; 20,613	0–1
2	April 24	Indiana	W 116–98	Allen Iverson (45)	Dikembe Mutombo (11)	Allen Iverson (9)	First Union Center; 20,739	1–1
3	April 28	@ Indiana	W 92–87	Allen Iverson (32)	Dikembe Mutombo (15)	Allen Iverson (6)	Conseco Fieldhouse; 18,345	2–1
4	May 2	@ Indiana	W 88–85	Allen Iverson (33)	Dikembe Mutombo (11)	Aaron McKie (6)	Conseco Fieldhouse; 18,345	3–1

Conference semifinals: 4–3 (home: 3–1; road: 1–2)

Game	Date	Team	Score	High points	High rebounds	High assists	Location Attendance	Series
1	May 6	Toronto	L 93–96	Allen Iverson (36)	Dikembe Mutombo (12)	Eric Snow (7)	First Union Center; 20,892	0–1
2	May 9	Toronto	W 97–92	Allen Iverson (54)	Tyrone Hill (10)	Eric Snow (5)	First Union Center; 20,870	1–1
3	May 11	@ Toronto	L 78–102	Allen Iverson (23)	Dikembe Mutombo (9)	Allen Iverson (8)	Air Canada Centre; 20,436	1–2
4	May 13	@ Toronto	W 84–79	Allen Iverson (30)	Dikembe Mutombo (17)	Iverson, McKie (5)	Air Canada Centre; 20,351	2–2
5	May 16	Toronto	W 121–88	Allen Iverson (52)	Dikembe Mutombo (9)	Aaron McKie (9)	First Union Center; 20,939	3–2
6	May 18	@ Toronto	L 89–101	Allen Iverson (20)	Dikembe Mutombo (14)	Aaron McKie (6)	Air Canada Centre; 20,499	3–3
7	May 20	Toronto	W 88–87	Aaron McKie (22)	Dikembe Mutombo (17)	Allen Iverson (16)	First Union Center; 20,848	4–3

Conference finals: 4–3 (home: 3–1; road: 1–2)

Game	Date	Team	Score	High points	High rebounds	High assists	Location Attendance	Series
1	May 22	Milwaukee	W 93–85	Allen Iverson (34)	Dikembe Mutombo (18)	Iverson, Snow (6)	First Union Center; 20,877	1–0
2	May 24	Milwaukee	L 78–92	Aaron McKie (21)	Dikembe Mutombo (20)	Allen Iverson (9)	First Union Center; 20,998	1–1
3	May 26	@ Milwaukee	L 74–80	Aaron McKie (22)	Dikembe Mutombo (10)	Aaron McKie (5)	Bradley Center; 18,717	1–2
4	May 28	@ Milwaukee	W 89–83	Allen Iverson (28)	Dikembe Mutombo (15)	Aaron McKie (9)	Bradley Center; 18,717	2–2
5	May 30	Milwaukee	W 89–88	Dikembe Mutombo (21)	Dikembe Mutombo (13)	Allen Iverson (8)	First Union Center; 21,087	3–2
6	June 1	@ Milwaukee	L 100–110	Allen Iverson (46)	Dikembe Mutombo (14)	Aaron McKie (9)	Bradley Center; 18,717	3–3
7	June 3	Milwaukee	W 108–91	Allen Iverson (44)	Dikembe Mutombo (19)	Aaron McKie (13)	First Union Center; 21,046	4–3

NBA Finals: 1–4 (home: 0–3; road: 1–1)

Game	Date	Team	Score	High points	High rebounds	High assists	Location Attendance	Series
1	June 6	@ L.A. Lakers	W 107–101 (OT)	Allen Iverson (48)	Dikembe Mutombo (16)	Aaron McKie (9)	Staples Center; 18,997	1–0
2	June 8	@ L.A. Lakers	L 89–98	Allen Iverson (23)	Dikembe Mutombo (13)	Aaron McKie (6)	Staples Center; 18,997	1–1
3	June 10	L.A. Lakers	L 91–96	Allen Iverson (35)	Iverson, Mutombo (12)	Aaron McKie (8)	First Union Center; 20,900	1–2
4	June 13	L.A. Lakers	L 86–100	Allen Iverson (35)	Dikembe Mutombo (9)	Iverson, Snow (4)	First Union Center; 20,896	1–3
5	June 15	L.A. Lakers	L 96–108	Allen Iverson (37)	Tyrone Hill (13)	Eric Snow (12)	First Union Center; 20,890	1–4

2001 schedule

== NBA Finals ==
Game	Date	Road team	Result	Home team
Game 1	June 6	Philadelphia 76ers	107–101 (OT) (1–0)	Los Angeles Lakers
Game 2	June 8	Philadelphia 76ers	89–98 (1–1)	Los Angeles Lakers
Game 3	June 10	Los Angeles Lakers	96–91 (2–1)	Philadelphia 76ers
Game 4	June 13	Los Angeles Lakers	100–86 (3–1)	Philadelphia 76ers
Game 5	June 15	Los Angeles Lakers	108–96 (4–1)	Philadelphia 76ers

The Finals were played using a 2–3–2 site format, where the first two and last two games are held at the team with home court advantage. The NBA, after experimenting in the early years, restored this original format for the Finals in 1985. As of the 2013–2014 NBA finals played by the San Antonio Spurs and the Miami Heat, the finals have again been returned to a 2–2–1–1–1 format.

== Player statistics ==
Legend
GP	Games played	GS	Games started	MPG	Minutes per game
FG%	Field-goal percentage	3P%	3-point field-goal percentage	FT%	Free-throw percentage
RPG	Rebounds per game	APG	Assists per game	SPG	Steals per game
BPG	Blocks per game	PPG	Points per game

=== Regular season ===
Player	GP	GS	MPG	FG%	3P%	FT%	RPG	APG	SPG	BPG	PPG
Raja Bell	5	0	6.0	.286	.333		.2	.0	.2	.0	1.0
Rodney Buford	47	0	12.2	.432	.421	.828	1.6	.4	.4	.1	5.3
Matt Geiger	35	4	15.5	.393	.000	.685	4.0	.4	.3	.2	6.1
Tyrone Hill	76	75	31.1	.474	.000	.630	9.0	.6	.5	.4	9.6
Allen Iverson	71	71	42.0	.420	.320	.814	3.8	4.6	2.5	.3	31.1
Jumaine Jones	65	0	13.3	.444	.333	.755	2.9	.5	.5	.2	4.7
Toni Kukoč^{†}	48	5	20.4	.458	.410	.591	3.4	1.9	.7	.1	8.0
George Lynch	82	80	32.3	.445	.263	.719	7.2	1.7	1.2	.4	8.4
Todd MacCulloch	63	3	9.5	.589		.636	2.7	.2	.1	.3	4.1
Vernon Maxwell^{†}	24	6	15.6	.336	.328	.682	1.5	1.2	.5	.0	5.0
Aaron McKie	76	33	31.5	.473	.312	.768	4.1	5.0	1.4	.1	11.6
Roshown McLeod^{†}	1	0	15.0	.500	.000		2.0	.0	.0	.0	2.0
Anthony Miller^{†}	1	0	2.0				.0	.0	.0	.0	.0
Nazr Mohammed^{†}	30	3	6.5	.466		.500	1.8	.1	.2	.2	3.2
Dikembe Mutombo^{†}	26	26	33.7	.495		.759	12.4	.8	.3	2.5	11.7
Kevin Ollie^{†}	51	4	15.0	.430	.333	.729	1.4	2.4	.5	.0	3.8
Theo Ratliff	50	50	36.0	.499		.760	8.3	1.2	.6	3.7	12.4
Juan Ignacio Sánchez^{†}	24	0	4.8	.429	.000	1.000	.6	1.5	.4	.0	.8
Eric Snow	50	50	34.8	.418	.263	.792	3.3	7.4	1.5	.1	9.8

=== Playoffs ===
Player	GP	GS	MPG	FG%	3P%	FT%	RPG	APG	SPG	BPG	PPG
Raja Bell	15	0	8.3	.444	.250	.571	.9	.5	1.0	.0	2.3
Rodney Buford	15	0	4.8	.333	.500	1.000	.8	.2	.3	.1	1.4
Matt Geiger	12	0	8.3	.586		1.000	1.5	.6	.2	.0	3.2
Tyrone Hill	23	23	32.3	.409	.000	.679	7.3	.4	.6	.5	7.2
Allen Iverson	22	22	46.2	.389	.338	.774	4.7	6.1	2.4	.3	32.9
Jumaine Jones	23	14	19.4	.416	.250	.714	3.7	.7	.4	.5	5.5
George Lynch	10	8	22.2	.480	.000	.643	5.1	1.2	1.3	.2	5.7
Todd MacCulloch	18	0	6.1	.632		.800	1.6	.2	.0	.2	3.1
Aaron McKie	23	16	38.8	.415	.422	.787	5.2	5.3	1.5	.1	14.6
Dikembe Mutombo	23	23	42.7	.490	.000	.777	13.7	.7	.7	3.1	13.9
Kevin Ollie	23	0	5.3	.370		.929	.4	1.0	.0	.0	1.4
Eric Snow	23	9	31.2	.414	.000	.727	3.7	4.5	1.2	.1	9.3

- ^{†} Denotes player spent time with another team in the season. Stats reflect time with the 76ers only.

Player statistics citation:

== Awards and records ==
- Allen Iverson, NBA Most Valuable Player Award
- Dikembe Mutombo, NBA Defensive Player of the Year Award
- Aaron McKie, NBA Sixth Man of the Year Award
- Larry Brown, NBA Coach of the Year Award
- Allen Iverson, All-NBA First Team
- Dikembe Mutombo, All-NBA Second Team
- Dikembe Mutombo, NBA All-Defensive First Team
