= 2000–01 Atlanta Hawks season =

NBA professional basketball team season

- Head coach: Lon Kruger
- Arena: Philips Arena

Results
- Record: 25–57 (.305)
- Place: Division: 4th (Central); Conference: 13th (Eastern)
- Playoff finish: Did not qualify
- Stats at Basketball Reference

Local media
- Television: WHOT-TV; Fox Sports Net South; Turner South
- Radio: WCNN

The 2000–01 Atlanta Hawks season was the 52nd season for the Atlanta Hawks in the National Basketball Association, and their 33rd season in Atlanta, Georgia.

== Season summary ==
=== Off-season ===
The Hawks received the sixth overall pick in the 2000 NBA draft, and selected small forward DerMarr Johnson from the University of Cincinnati. During the off-season, the team signed free agent Matt Maloney, re-signed former Hawks guard Anthony Johnson after a brief stint with the Orlando Magic, and hired Lon Kruger as their new head coach.

=== Regular season ===
Under Kruger and with the addition of DerMarr Johnson, the Hawks got off to a bad start as the team lost their first seven games of the regular season, losing 13 of their first 16 games in November. However, the team played around .500 in winning percentage by posting a 7–7 record in December. In January, the Hawks traded Anthony Johnson and Jim Jackson to the Cleveland Cavaliers in exchange for Brevin Knight; before the trade, Jackson averaged 14.3 points and 4.6 rebounds per game in 17 games, but struggled only shooting .355 in field-goal percentage. The Hawks posted another seven-game losing streak in February, and held a 16–33 record at the All-Star break.

At mid-season, the Hawks traded All-Star center Dikembe Mutombo, and Roshown McLeod to the Philadelphia 76ers in exchange for Theo Ratliff, Toni Kukoč and Nazr Mohammed; before the trade, Mutombo averaged 9.1 points, 14.1 rebounds and 2.8 blocks per game in 49 games, while McLeod contributed 9.9 points per game in 34 games. However, Ratliff injured his wrist prior to the trade, and was out for the remainder of the season. Mutombo would later on be named the NBA Defensive Player of the Year with the 76ers, who went on to lose in five games to the defending NBA champion Los Angeles Lakers in the 2001 NBA Finals. The Hawks continued to struggle posting a 10-game losing streak between February and March, and finished in seventh place in the Central Division with a 25–57 record.

Second-year star Jason Terry showed improvement averaging 19.7 points, 4.9 assists and 1.3 steals per game, and also leading the Hawks with 124 three-point field goals, while Kukoc averaged 19.7 points, 5.7 rebounds and 6.2 assists per game in 17 games after the trade, and Lorenzen Wright provided the team with 12.4 points and 7.5 rebounds per game. In addition, Mohammed contributed 12.3 points and 9.0 rebounds per game in 28 games, while Alan Henderson provided with 10.5 points and 5.6 rebounds per game, and Knight contributed 6.9 points, 6.1 assists and 2.0 steals per game in 47 games. Meanwhile, Chris Crawford averaged 6.8 points per game, Maloney provided with 6.7 points and 2.8 assists per game, second-year guard Dion Glover contributed 5.9 points per game, DerMarr Johnson contributed 5.1 points per game, and rookie forward, and second-round draft pick Hanno Möttölä averaged 4.4 points and 2.4 rebounds per game.

During the NBA All-Star weekend at the MCI Center in Washington, D.C., and before the mid-season trade, Mutombo was selected for the 2001 NBA All-Star Game, as a member of the Eastern Conference All-Star team. Mutombo scored 6 points along with 22 rebounds and 3 blocks, as the Eastern Conference defeated the Western Conference, 111–110. Meanwhile, Terry was selected for the NBA Rookie Challenge Game, as a member of the Sophomores team. Terry also finished tied in seventh place in Most Improved Player voting, while Ratliff finished in seventh place in Defensive Player of the Year voting.

The Hawks finished 27th in the NBA in home-game attendance, with an attendance of 560,330 at the Philips Arena during the regular season, which was the third-lowest in the league.

=== Aftermath ===
Following the season, Wright and Knight were both traded to the Memphis Grizzlies on draft day, and Maloney was released to free agency.

== Offseason ==
=== Draft picks ===
Round	Pick	Player	Position	Nationality	College
1	6	DerMarr Johnson	SF/SG	United States	Cincinnati
2	40	Hanno Möttölä	PF	Finland	Utah
2	57	Scoonie Penn	PG	United States	Ohio State

== Roster ==
2000–01 Atlanta Hawks roster
Players

Pos.	No.	Player	Height	Weight	DOB	From
F	3	Cal Bowdler	6 ft 10 in (2.08 m)	245 lb (111 kg)	1977–03–31	Old Dominion
F	4	Chris Crawford	6 ft 9 in (2.06 m)	235 lb (107 kg)	1975–05–13	Marquette
G	5	Dion Glover	6 ft 5 in (1.96 m)	228 lb (103 kg)	1978–10–22	Georgia Tech
F	44	Alan Henderson	6 ft 9 in (2.06 m)	235 lb (107 kg)	1972–12–02	Indiana
G/F	1	DerMarr Johnson	6 ft 9 in (2.06 m)	201 lb (91 kg)	1980–05–05	Cincinnati
G	22	Brevin Knight	5 ft 10 in (1.78 m)	173 lb (78 kg)	1975–11–08	Stanford
F	7	Toni Kukoč	6 ft 10 in (2.08 m)	192 lb (87 kg)	1968–09–18	Croatia
G	12	Matt Maloney	6 ft 3 in (1.91 m)	192 lb (87 kg)	1971–12–06	Penn
C	14	Nazr Mohammed	6 ft 10 in (2.08 m)	221 lb (100 kg)	1977–09–05	Kentucky
F	13	Hanno Möttölä	6 ft 11 in (2.11 m)	247 lb (112 kg)	1976–09–09	Utah
F/C	–	Theo Ratliff (injured) (IN)	6 ft 10 in (2.08 m)	225 lb (102 kg)	1973–04–17	Wyoming
G	31	Jason Terry	6 ft 2 in (1.88 m)	185 lb (84 kg)	1977–09–15	Arizona
F/C	42	Lorenzen Wright	6 ft 11 in (2.11 m)	225 lb (102 kg)	1975–11–04	Memphis

Coaches
Head coach
- Lon Kruger
Assistant(s)
- Gar Heard
- Rick Mahorn
- Eric Musselman
- Gary Wortman

Legend
- (DP) Unsigned draft pick
- (FA) Free agent
- (S) Suspended
- (IN) Inactive
- Injured

Roster

=== Roster Notes ===
- Center Theo Ratliff was acquired by the Hawks from the Philadelphia 76ers in a mid-season trade, but was placed on the injured reserve list due to a wrist injury he sustained with the 76ers, and did not play with the Hawks this season.

== Regular season ==
=== Season standings ===
Central Division	W	L	PCT	GB	Home	Road	Div
y-Milwaukee Bucks	52	30	.634	–	31–10	21–20	19–9
x-Toronto Raptors	47	35	.573	5	27–14	20–21	18–10
x-Charlotte Hornets	46	36	.561	6	28–13	18–23	20–8
x-Indiana Pacers	41	41	.500	11	26–15	15–26	15–13
e-Detroit Pistons	32	50	.390	20	18-23	14–27	16–12
e-Cleveland Cavaliers	30	52	.366	22	20–21	10–31	11–17
e-Atlanta Hawks	25	57	.305	27	18–23	7–34	9–19
e-Chicago Bulls	15	67	.183	37	10–31	5–36	4–24

Eastern Conference
#	Team	W	L	PCT	GB
1	c-Philadelphia 76ers	56	26	.683	–
2	y-Milwaukee Bucks	52	30	.634	4
3	x-Miami Heat	50	32	.610	6
4	x-New York Knicks	48	34	.585	8
5	x-Toronto Raptors	47	35	.573	9
6	x-Charlotte Hornets	46	36	.561	10
7	x-Orlando Magic	43	39	.524	13
8	x-Indiana Pacers	41	41	.500	15
9	e-Boston Celtics	36	46	.439	20
10	e-Detroit Pistons	32	50	.390	24
11	e-Cleveland Cavaliers	30	52	.366	26
12	e-New Jersey Nets	26	56	.317	30
13	e-Atlanta Hawks	25	57	.305	31
14	e-Washington Wizards	19	63	.232	37
15	e-Chicago Bulls	15	67	.183	42

z - clinched division title
y - clinched division title
x - clinched playoff spot

== Player statistics ==
Legend
GP	Games played	GS	Games started	MPG	Minutes per game
FG%	Field-goal percentage	3P%	3-point field-goal percentage	FT%	Free-throw percentage
RPG	Rebounds per game	APG	Assists per game	SPG	Steals per game
BPG	Blocks per game	PPG	Points per game

=== Season ===
Player	GP	GS	MPG	FG%	3P%	FT%	RPG	APG	SPG	BPG	PPG
Cal Bowdler	44	0	8.5	.465	.200	.825	1.8	.1	.2	.5	3.2
Ira Bowman	3	0	6.3	.000	.	.	.7	2.3	.0	.0	.0
Sean Colson	3	0	4.7	.000	.000	.	1.0	1.0	.0	.0	.0
Chris Crawford	47	22	19.2	.452	.273	.819	2.3	.8	.4	.3	6.8
Dion Glover	57	7	16.3	.420	.196	.681	2.3	1.2	.9	.2	5.9
Alan Henderson	73	42	24.8	.444	.000	.638	5.6	.7	.7	.4	10.5
Jim Jackson	17	14	32.4	.355	.421	.859	4.6	2.9	1.1	.2	14.3
Anthony Johnson	25	0	11.2	.366	.000	.706	.9	1.4	.7	.2	2.6
DerMarr Johnson	78	21	16.8	.374	.323	.736	2.3	.8	.6	.4	5.1
Brevin Knight	47	43	29.0	.385	.100	.817	3.4	6.1	2.0	.1	6.9
Toni Kukoč	17	14	36.4	.492	.481	.681	5.7	6.2	.8	.3	19.7
Matt Maloney	55	27	25.5	.420	.359	.765	2.1	2.8	1.0	.1	6.7
Roshown McLeod	34	25	26.7	.436	.095	.882	3.5	1.7	.7	.2	9.9
Anthony Miller	2	0	3.0	.500	.	.	1.0	.0	.0	.0	1.0
Nazr Mohammed	28	19	25.6	.480	.000	.765	9.0	.6	.8	1.0	12.3
Hanno Möttölä	73	3	13.5	.444	.000	.811	2.4	.3	.2	.1	4.4
Dikembe Mutombo	49	49	35.0	.477	.	.695	14.1	1.1	.4	2.8	9.1
Andy Panko	1	0	1.0	.	.	.	.0	.0	.0	.0	.0
Larry Robinson	33	1	19.1	.364	.379	.875	2.6	1.1	.8	.1	6.0
Pepe Sanchez	5	0	6.8	.000	.	.	.2	1.0	.4	.0	.0
Tony Smith	6	0	13.0	.348	.000	.500	.5	1.7	1.2	.0	2.8
Jason Terry	82	77	37.7	.436	.395	.846	3.3	4.9	1.3	.1	19.7
Lorenzen Wright	71	46	28.0	.448	.000	.718	7.5	1.2	.6	.9	12.4

Player statistics citation:

== Awards and records ==
- Dikembe Mutombo, All-NBA Second Team

== See also ==
- 2000-01 NBA season
