= 2000–01 New Jersey Nets season =

NBA professional basketball team season

- Head coach: Byron Scott
- Owners: Lewis Katz
- Arena: Continental Airlines Arena

Results
- Record: 26–56 (.317)
- Place: Division: 6th (Atlantic); Conference: 12th (Eastern)
- Playoff finish: Did not qualify
- Stats at Basketball Reference

The 2000–01 New Jersey Nets season was the Nets' 34th season in the National Basketball Association, and 25th season in East Rutherford, New Jersey.

== Season summary ==
=== Off-season ===
Despite finishing with a 31–51 record the previous season, the Nets won the NBA draft lottery, and selected power forward Kenyon Martin from the University of Cincinnati with the first overall pick in the 2000 NBA draft. During the off-season, the team signed free agents Aaron Williams, and rookie shooting guard Stephen Jackson, and hired retired Los Angeles Lakers guard Byron Scott as their new head coach.

For the season, the Nets slightly redesigned their grey alternate road uniforms, changing the color of the state name New Jersey, and the jersey numbers from dark navy blue to white; these uniforms would remain in use until 2005.

=== Regular season ===
Under Scott and with the addition of Martin, Williams and Jackson, the Nets got off to a 6–4 start to the regular season, but then lost 17 of their next 20 games, which included a nine-game losing streak, and later on held a 17–34 record at the All-Star break. The team dealt with injuries as Keith Van Horn only played just 49 games due to a leg injury, while Kendall Gill only appeared in just 31 games due to tendinitis in his right knee, and Kerry Kittles missed the entire season due to a knee injury. The Nets lost their final six games of the season, finishing in sixth place in the Atlantic Division with a 26–56 record.

Stephon Marbury averaged 23.9 points and 7.6 assists per game, and led the Nets with 110 three-point field goals, while Van Horn averaged 17.0 points and 7.1 rebounds per game, and Martin provided the team with 12.0 points, 7.4 rebounds and 1.7 blocks per game, and was named to the NBA All-Rookie First Team. In addition, sixth man Johnny Newman contributed 10.9 points per game off the bench, while Williams provided with 10.2 points, 7.2 rebounds and 1.4 blocks per game also off the bench, Lucious Harris contributed 9.4 points per game, and Gill averaged 9.1 points and 1.5 steals per game. Meanwhile, Jackson contributed 8.2 points per game, Douglas provided with 5.7 points and 2.4 assists per game, and second-year center Evan Eschmeyer averaged 3.4 points and 4.9 rebounds per game.

During the NBA All-Star weekend at the MCI Center in Washington, D.C., Marbury was selected for the 2001 NBA All-Star Game, as a member of the Eastern Conference All-Star team; it was his first ever All-Star appearance. Meanwhile, Martin and Jackson were both selected for the NBA Rookie Challenge Game, as members of the Rookies team. Martin also finished in second place in Rookie of the Year voting, behind Mike Miller of the Orlando Magic.

The Nets finished 28th in the NBA in home-game attendance, with an attendance of 556,573 at the Continental Airlines Arena during the regular season, which was the second-lowest in the league.

=== Aftermath ===
Following the season, Marbury and Newman were both traded to the Phoenix Suns, while Gill signed with the Miami Heat. Meanwhile, Jackson signed with the San Antonio Spurs, and Sherman Douglas retired.

== Offseason ==
=== Draft picks ===
Round	Pick	Player	Position	Nationality	College
1	1	Kenyon Martin	PF	United States	Cincinnati
2	36	Soumaila Samake	C	Mali	

== Roster ==
2000–01 New Jersey Nets roster
Players

Pos.	No.	Player	Height	Weight	DOB	From
G	11	Sherman Douglas (injured)	6 ft 0 in (1.83 m)	180 lb (82 kg)	1966-09-15	Syracuse
C	42	Evan Eschmeyer	6 ft 11 in (2.11 m)	255 lb (116 kg)	1975-05-30	Northwestern
F	14	Jamie Feick (injured)	6 ft 9 in (2.06 m)	255 lb (116 kg)	1974-07-03	Michigan State
G	8	Eddie Gill	6 ft 0 in (1.83 m)	190 lb (86 kg)	1978-08-16	Weber State
G/F	13	Kendall Gill (injured)	6 ft 5 in (1.96 m)	195 lb (88 kg)	1968-05-25	Illinois
G	12	Lucious Harris	6 ft 5 in (1.96 m)	190 lb (86 kg)	1970-12-18	Long Beach State
F	24	Stephen Jackson	6 ft 8 in (2.03 m)	218 lb (99 kg)	1978-04-05	Butler CC
G	30	Kerry Kittles (injured) (IN)	6 ft 5 in (1.96 m)	179 lb (81 kg)	1974-06-12	Villanova
G	33	Stephon Marbury (injured)	6 ft 2 in (1.88 m)	180 lb (82 kg)	1977-02-20	Georgia Tech
F	6	Kenyon Martin (injured)	6 ft 9 in (2.06 m)	234 lb (106 kg)	1977-12-30	Cincinnati
C	22	Jim McIlvaine	7 ft 1 in (2.16 m)	240 lb (109 kg)	1972-07-30	Marquette
F	20	Johnny Newman	6 ft 7 in (2.01 m)	190 lb (86 kg)	1963-11-28	Richmond
G	2	Doug Overton	6 ft 3 in (1.91 m)	190 lb (86 kg)	1969-08-03	La Salle
C	45	Soumaila Samake	7 ft 0 in (2.13 m)	230 lb (104 kg)	1978-03-18	Mali
C	50	Vladimir Stepania	7 ft 0 in (2.13 m)	236 lb (107 kg)	1976-05-08	Republic of Georgia
F	31	Mark Strickland	6 ft 9 in (2.06 m)	210 lb (95 kg)	1970-07-14	Temple
G	5	Jamel Thomas	6 ft 6 in (1.98 m)	215 lb (98 kg)	1976-07-19	Providence
F	44	Keith Van Horn	6 ft 10 in (2.08 m)	220 lb (100 kg)	1975-10-23	Utah
F/C	34	Aaron Williams	6 ft 9 in (2.06 m)	220 lb (100 kg)	1972-10-02	Xavier

Coaches
Head coach
- Byron Scott
Assistant(s)
- Lawrence Frank
- Eddie Jordan
- Mike O'Koren

Legend
- (DP) Unsigned draft pick
- (FA) Free agent
- (S) Suspended
- (IN) Inactive
- Injured

Roster

Roster notes

- Shooting guard Kerry Kittles was on the injured reserve list due to a knee injury, and missed the entire regular season.

== Regular season ==
=== Season standings ===
Atlantic Division	W	L	PCT	GB	Home	Road	Div
y-Philadelphia 76ers	56	26	.683	–	29–12	27–14	18–6
x-Miami Heat	50	32	.610	6	29–12	21–20	15–10
x-New York Knicks	48	34	.585	8	30–11	18–23	16–9
x-Orlando Magic	43	39	.524	13	26–15	17–24	14–10
e-Boston Celtics	36	46	.439	20	20–21	16–25	11–13
e-New Jersey Nets	26	56	.317	30	18–23	8–33	8–16
e-Washington Wizards	19	63	.232	37	12–29	7–34	3–21

Eastern Conference
#	Team	W	L	PCT	GB
1	c-Philadelphia 76ers	56	26	.683	–
2	y-Milwaukee Bucks	52	30	.634	4
3	x-Miami Heat	50	32	.610	6
4	x-New York Knicks	48	34	.585	8
5	x-Toronto Raptors	47	35	.573	9
6	x-Charlotte Hornets	46	36	.561	10
7	x-Orlando Magic	43	39	.524	13
8	x-Indiana Pacers	41	41	.500	15
9	e-Boston Celtics	36	46	.439	20
10	e-Detroit Pistons	32	50	.390	24
11	e-Cleveland Cavaliers	30	52	.366	26
12	e-New Jersey Nets	26	56	.317	30
13	e-Atlanta Hawks	25	57	.305	31
14	e-Washington Wizards	19	63	.232	37
15	e-Chicago Bulls	15	67	.183	42

z – clinched division title
y – clinched division title
x – clinched playoff spot

== Player statistics ==
Legend
GP	Games played	GS	Games started	MPG	Minutes per game
FG%	Field-goal percentage	3P%	3-point field-goal percentage	FT%	Free-throw percentage
RPG	Rebounds per game	APG	Assists per game	SPG	Steals per game
BPG	Blocks per game	PPG	Points per game

=== Regular season ===
New Jersey Nets statistics
Player	GP	GS	MPG	FG%	3P%	FT%	RPG	APG	SPG	BPG	PPG
Stephon Marbury	67	67	38.2	.441	.328	.790	3.1	7.6	1.2	0.1	23.9
Keith Van Horn	49	47	35.4	.435	.382	.806	7.1	1.7	0.8	0.4	17.0
Kenyon Martin	68	68	33.4	.445	.091	.630	7.4	1.9	1.1	1.7	12.0
Johnny Newman	82	17	25.0	.419	.335	.855	2.1	1.4	0.8	0.1	10.9
Aaron Williams	82	25	28.5	.457	.000	.787	7.2	1.1	0.7	1.4	10.2
Lucious Harris	73	50	28.4	.425	.348	.770	3.9	1.8	1.0	0.2	9.4
Kendall Gill	31	26	28.8	.331	.286	.722	4.2	2.8	1.5	0.2	9.1
Stephen Jackson	77	40	21.6	.425	.335	.719	2.7	1.8	1.1	0.2	8.2
Doug Overton	12	9	26.3	.376	.313	.600	2.0	4.4	0.3	0.0	6.9
Mark Strickland	9	0	22.4	.389	1.000	.727	4.6	0.8	0.4	0.3	5.7
Sherman Douglas	59	7	18.5	.403	.200	.748	1.3	2.4	0.6	0.1	5.7
Eddie Gill	8	0	19.0	.390	.333	.800	1.1	3.0	0.5	0.1	4.9
Jamie Feick	6	0	24.8	.348		.500	9.3	0.8	1.3	0.5	3.7
Evan Eschmeyer	74	51	18.0	.460		.657	4.9	0.5	0.6	0.8	3.4
Vladimir Stepania	29	0	9.7	.318	.250	.735	3.8	0.6	0.3	0.4	2.8
Jamel Thomas	5	0	11.2	.316	.333		1.8	0.0	0.6	0.0	2.6
Jim McIlvaine	18	3	10.7	.357		.667	1.9	0.2	0.4	0.8	1.6
Soumaila Samake	34	0	6.6	.375		.417	1.6	0.0	0.1	0.4	1.4
Kevin Ollie	19	0	8.5	.185		.632	1.2	1.3	0.3	0.0	1.2

Player statistics citation:

== Awards and records ==
- Kenyon Martin, NBA All-Rookie Team 1st Team

== See also ==
- 2000–01 NBA season
