= 2000–01 Washington Wizards season =

NBA professional basketball team season

- Head coach: Leonard Hamilton
- President: Michael Jordan
- General manager: Wes Unseld
- Owner: Abe Pollin
- Arena: MCI Center

Results
- Record: 19–63 (.232)
- Place: Division: 7th (Atlantic); Conference: 14th (Eastern)
- Playoff finish: Did not qualify
- Stats at Basketball Reference

Local media
- Television: WBDC; Home Team Sports
- Radio: WTEM

The 2000–01 Washington Wizards season was the 40th season for the Washington Wizards in the National Basketball Association, and their 28th season in Washington, D.C. The city of Washington, D.C. hosted the NBA All-Star weekend at the MCI Center this season, which featured the 2001 NBA All-Star Game.

== Season summary ==
=== Off-season ===
During the off-season, the Wizards acquired Felipe López and Cherokee Parks from the Vancouver Grizzlies, acquired Popeye Jones from the Denver Nuggets, and hired Leonard Hamilton as their new head coach; Parks was later on traded to the Los Angeles Clippers in exchange for Tyrone Nesby early into the regular season.

=== Regular season ===
Under Leonard Hamilton, the Wizards continued to struggle posting a nine-game losing streak between November and December. The team posted another nine-game losing streak in January leading to an awful 7–34 start to the regular season, and later holding a 12–37 record at the All-Star break, as Mitch Richmond only played just 37 games due to knee injuries. At mid-season, Juwan Howard, who grew disgruntled with all the team failures, was traded along with second-year center Calvin Booth to the Dallas Mavericks in exchange for Christian Laettner, Hubert Davis, Loy Vaught and rookies; shooting guard Courtney Alexander and power forward Etan Thomas, who was out for the entire regular season due to a toe injury he sustained with the Mavericks, while Lopez was released to free agency, and later on signed with the Minnesota Timberwolves.

After the trade deadline, Rod Strickland, who was also disgruntled playing for the Wizards, was also released and later on re-signed with his former team, the Portland Trail Blazers. The Wizards lost nine of their final ten games of the season, and finished in last place in the Atlantic Division with a dreadful 19–63 record; it was their worst record to that point over a full 82-game season, until it was surpassed by the 2023–24 Wizards, who would finish with a franchise-worst 15–67 record.

Second-year star Richard Hamilton showed improvement and led the team in scoring with 18.1 points per game, while Alexander averaged 17.0 points per game in 27 games after the trade, and was named to the NBA All-Rookie Second Team, and Richmond contributed 16.2 points per game. In addition, Laettner averaged 13.2 points and 6.1 rebounds per game in 25 games, while Davis provided the team with 10.2 points per game in 15 games, Chris Whitney contributed 9.5 points and 4.2 assists per game, and Jahidi White provided with 8.6 points, 7.7 rebounds and 1.6 blocks. Meanwhile, Nesby averaged 8.4 points per game in 48 games, while undrafted rookie point guard David Vanterpool contributed 5.5 points and 3.0 assists per game, and Michael Smith provided with 3.8 points and 7.1 rebounds per game.

During the NBA All-Star weekend at the MCI Center in Washington, D.C., Richard Hamilton was selected for the NBA Rookie Challenge Game, as a member of the Sophomores team, and also participated in the NBA 2Ball Competition, along with Nikki McCray of the WNBA's Washington Mystics. The Wizards finished 18th in the NBA in home-game attendance, with an attendance of 638,653 at the MCI Center during the regular season.

=== Aftermath ===
Following the season, Richmond signed as a free agent with the Los Angeles Lakers, while Smith, Vaught and Vanterpool were all released to free agency, and Leonard Hamilton resigned as head coach after only one season with the Wizards.

== Offseason ==
=== Draft picks ===
Round	Pick	Player	Position	Nationality	College
2	35	Mike Smith	SF	United States	Louisiana-Monroe

== Roster ==
2000–01 Washington Wizards roster
Players

Pos.	No.	Player	Height	Weight	DOB	From
G	4	Courtney Alexander	6 ft 5 in (1.96 m)	205 lb (93 kg)		Fresno State
G	24	Hubert Davis	6 ft 5 in (1.96 m)	183 lb (83 kg)		North Carolina
G/F	32	Richard Hamilton	6 ft 6 in (1.98 m)	185 lb (84 kg)		Connecticut
F	50	Popeye Jones	6 ft 8 in (2.03 m)	250 lb (113 kg)		Murray State
F/C	44	Christian Laettner	6 ft 11 in (2.11 m)	235 lb (107 kg)		Duke
F	8	Tyrone Nesby	6 ft 6 in (1.98 m)	225 lb (102 kg)		UNLV
G	3	Laron Profit	6 ft 5 in (1.96 m)	204 lb (93 kg)		Maryland
G	2	Mitch Richmond (injured)	6 ft 5 in (1.96 m)	215 lb (98 kg)		Kansas State
F	34	Michael Smith	6 ft 8 in (2.03 m)	230 lb (104 kg)		Providence
F	40	Mike Smith	6 ft 8 in (2.03 m)	195 lb (88 kg)		Louisiana–Monroe
F/C	–	Etan Thomas (injured) (IN)	6 ft 9 in (2.06 m)	256 lb (116 kg)		Syracuse
G	22	David Vanterpool	6 ft 5 in (1.96 m)	200 lb (91 kg)		St. Bonaventure
F	35	Loy Vaught	6 ft 9 in (2.06 m)	230 lb (104 kg)		Michigan
F/C	55	Jahidi White	6 ft 9 in (2.06 m)	290 lb (132 kg)		Georgetown
G	12	Chris Whitney (injured)	6 ft 0 in (1.83 m)	168 lb (76 kg)		Clemson

Coaches
Head coach
- Leonard Hamilton
Assistant(s)
- Johnny Bach
- Larry Drew
- Stan Jones

Legend
- (DP) Unsigned draft pick
- (FA) Free agent
- (S) Suspended
- (IN) Inactive
- Injured

Roster

=== Roster Notes ===
- Rookie power forward Etan Thomas was acquired by the Wizards from the Dallas Mavericks in a mid-season trade, but was placed on the injured reserve list due to a toe injury he sustained with the Mavericks, and missed the entire regular season.

== Regular season ==
=== Season standings ===
Atlantic Division	W	L	PCT	GB	Home	Road	Div
y-Philadelphia 76ers	56	26	.683	–	29–12	27–14	18–6
x-Miami Heat	50	32	.610	6	29–12	21–20	15–10
x-New York Knicks	48	34	.585	8	30–11	18–23	16–9
x-Orlando Magic	43	39	.524	13	26–15	17–24	14–10
e-Boston Celtics	36	46	.439	20	20–21	16–25	11–13
e-New Jersey Nets	26	56	.317	30	18–23	8–33	8–16
e-Washington Wizards	19	63	.232	37	12–29	7–34	3–21

Eastern Conference
#	Team	W	L	PCT	GB
1	c-Philadelphia 76ers	56	26	.683	–
2	y-Milwaukee Bucks	52	30	.634	4
3	x-Miami Heat	50	32	.610	6
4	x-New York Knicks	48	34	.585	8
5	x-Toronto Raptors	47	35	.573	9
6	x-Charlotte Hornets	46	36	.561	10
7	x-Orlando Magic	43	39	.524	13
8	x-Indiana Pacers	41	41	.500	15
9	e-Boston Celtics	36	46	.439	20
10	e-Detroit Pistons	32	50	.390	24
11	e-Cleveland Cavaliers	30	52	.366	26
12	e-New Jersey Nets	26	56	.317	30
13	e-Atlanta Hawks	25	57	.305	31
14	e-Washington Wizards	19	63	.232	37
15	e-Chicago Bulls	15	67	.183	42

z - clinched division title
y - clinched division title
x - clinched playoff spot

== Player statistics ==
Legend
GP	Games played	GS	Games started	MPG	Minutes per game
FG%	Field-goal percentage	3P%	3-point field-goal percentage	FT%	Free-throw percentage
RPG	Rebounds per game	APG	Assists per game	SPG	Steals per game
BPG	Blocks per game	PPG	Points per game

=== Regular season ===
Player	GP	GS	MPG	FG%	3P%	FT%	RPG	APG	SPG	BPG	PPG
Courtney Alexander^{†}	27	18	33.7	.448	.389	.857	3.0	1.5	1.1	.1	17.0
Calvin Booth^{†}	40	22	16.0	.440		.733	4.4	.6	.4	2.0	4.5
Hubert Davis^{†}	15	11	28.7	.479	.526	.905	2.0	3.3	.4	.0	10.2
Obinna Ekezie^{†}	29	0	9.4	.416		.698	2.6	.3	.2	.2	3.5
Richard Hamilton	78	42	32.3	.438	.274	.868	3.1	2.9	1.0	.1	18.1
Juwan Howard^{†}	54	54	36.7	.474		.770	7.0	2.9	.9	.4	18.2
Popeye Jones	45	1	14.2	.392	.167	.745	4.9	.7	.4	.2	3.6
Gerard King	45	3	15.7	.511		.800	2.9	.7	.3	.2	4.8
Christian Laettner^{†}	25	13	29.3	.491	.300	.844	6.1	2.3	1.2	.8	13.2
Felipe López^{†}	47	38	23.6	.436	.207	.732	3.4	1.6	.9	.4	8.1
Tyrone Nesby^{†}	48	22	25.5	.366	.291	.807	2.7	1.4	.9	.3	8.4
Cherokee Parks^{†}	13	0	13.7	.474		.706	3.1	.5	.5	.8	3.7
Laron Profit	35	12	17.3	.394	.269	.733	1.8	2.5	1.0	.3	4.3
Mitch Richmond	37	30	32.9	.407	.338	.894	2.9	3.0	1.2	.2	16.2
Michael Smith	79	29	20.4	.486	.000	.578	7.1	1.3	.7	.5	3.8
Mike Smith	17	0	10.6	.322	.167	.625	1.3	.6	.3	.2	3.0
Rod Strickland^{†}	33	28	30.9	.426	.250	.782	3.2	7.0	1.3	.1	12.2
David Vanterpool	22	0	18.7	.418	.000	.600	1.7	3.0	1.0	.1	5.5
Loy Vaught^{†}	14	0	11.2	.521		1.000	3.6	.5	.4	.1	3.9
Jahidi White	68	56	23.7	.498	.000	.567	7.7	.3	.5	1.6	8.6
Chris Whitney	59	31	26.0	.387	.375	.894	1.8	4.2	.9	.1	9.5

- ^{†} Denotes player spent time with another team in the season. Stats reflect time with the Wizards only.

Player statistics citation:

== Awards and records ==
- Courtney Alexander, NBA All-Rookie Team 2nd Team

== See also ==
- 2000-01 NBA season
