= 2000–01 Charlotte Hornets season =

NBA professional basketball team season

- Head coach: Paul Silas
- General manager: Bob Bass
- Owner: George Shinn Ray Wooldridge
- Arena: Charlotte Coliseum

Results
- Record: 46–36 (.561)
- Place: Division: 3rd (Central); Conference: 6th (Eastern)
- Playoff finish: Conference semifinals (lost to Bucks 3–4)
- Stats at Basketball Reference

Local media
- Television: SportSouth; WJZY
- Radio: WBT

The 2000–01 Charlotte Hornets season was the 13th season for the Charlotte Hornets in the National Basketball Association.

== Season summary ==
=== Off-season ===
The Hornets had the 19th overall pick in the 2000 NBA draft, and selected center Jamaal Magloire from the University of Kentucky. During the off-season, the team acquired Jamal Mashburn, P.J. Brown and Otis Thorpe from the Miami Heat, and re-signed free agent and former Hornets guard Hersey Hawkins, who played for the team from 1993 to 1995.

=== Regular season ===
With the addition of Mashburn and Brown, the Hornets won four of their first five games of the regular season, posted a five-game losing streak, but then posted a six-game winning streak afterwards. The team posted two seven-game winning streaks in December, and between February and March, and held a 26–25 record at the All-Star break. The Hornets finished in third place in the Central Division with a 46–36 record, earned the sixth seed in the Eastern Conference, and qualified for their sixth NBA playoff appearance.

Mashburn averaged 20.1 points, 7.6 rebounds and 5.4 assists per game, and led the Hornets with 103 three-point field goals, while David Wesley, who moved into the shooting guard position, averaged 17.2 points, 4.4 assists and 1.6 steals per game, and second-year guard Baron Davis showed improvement becoming the team's starting point guard, averaging 13.8 points, 7.3 assists and 2.1 steals per game. In addition, Elden Campbell provided the team with 13.1 points, 7.8 rebounds and 1.8 blocks per game, while Brown provided with 8.5 points and 9.3 rebounds per game, and was named to the NBA All-Defensive Second Team. Off the bench, Derrick Coleman averaged 8.1 points and 5.4 rebounds per game, while second-year forward Eddie Robinson contributed 7.4 points per game, and Magloire provided with 4.6 points, 4.0 rebounds and 1.1 blocks per game. Coleman was replaced with Brown as the team's starting power forward, and only played just 34 games due to an irregular heartbeat and weight problems.

During the NBA All-Star weekend at the MCI Center in Washington, D.C., Davis was selected for the NBA Rookie Challenge Game, as a member of the Sophomores team, and also participated in the NBA Slam Dunk Contest. Meanwhile, Wesley participated in the NBA 2Ball Competition, along with Dawn Staley of the WNBA's Charlotte Sting. Davis also finished in fifth place in Most Improved Player voting.

The Hornets' home-game attendance continued to decrease, as the team finished 21st in the NBA with an attendance of 615,424 at the Charlotte Coliseum during the regular season.

=== NBA playoffs ===
In the 2001 NBA playoffs, the Hornets all wore headbands to show team unity; in the Eastern Conference First Round, the team faced off against the 3rd–seeded Miami Heat, who were led by the All-Star trio of former Hornets players, Eddie Jones, Anthony Mason and Alonzo Mourning. The Hornets managed to win the first two games over the Heat on the road at the American Airlines Arena, before winning Game 3 at home, 94–79 at the Charlotte Coliseum to win the series in a three-game sweep.

In the Eastern Conference Semi-finals, the team faced off against the 2nd–seeded, and Central Division champion Milwaukee Bucks, who were led by the trio of All-Star guard Ray Allen, All-Star forward Glenn Robinson, and Sam Cassell. The Hornets lost the first two games to the Bucks on the road at the Bradley Center, but managed to win their next two home games at the Charlotte Coliseum, before winning Game 5 on the road, 94–86 to take a 3–2 series lead. However, the Hornets lost the next two games, which included a Game 7 loss to the Bucks at the Bradley Center, 104–95, thus losing in a hard-fought seven-game series.

In March, during the regular season, the Hornets applied with the NBA to move the team to Memphis, Tennessee for the following season, due to their decline in home-game attendance. However, they withdrew their application due to the rise of their attendance during the NBA playoffs, after sweeping the Heat in the first round, and with a capacity crowd of 22,283 in Game 3 at the Charlotte Coliseum.

=== Aftermath ===
Following the season, Coleman was traded back to his former team, the Philadelphia 76ers, while Robinson signed as a free agent with the Chicago Bulls, and Hawkins and Thorpe both retired.

== Draft picks ==
Round	Pick	Player	Position	Nationality	College
1	19	Jamaal Magloire	C	United States	Kentucky

== Roster ==
2000–01 Charlotte Hornets roster
Players

Pos.	No.	Player	Height	Weight	DOB	From
F/C	42	P. J. Brown	6 ft 11 in (2.11 m)	225 lb (102 kg)	1969–10–14	Louisiana Tech
F	2	Scott Burrell	6 ft 7 in (2.01 m)	218 lb (99 kg)	1971–01–12	Connecticut
F/C	5	Elden Campbell	6 ft 11 in (2.11 m)	215 lb (98 kg)	1968–07–23	Clemson
F/C	44	Derrick Coleman	6 ft 10 in (2.08 m)	230 lb (104 kg)	1967–06–21	Syracuse
G	1	Baron Davis	6 ft 3 in (1.91 m)	209 lb (95 kg)	1979–04–13	UCLA
G	33	Hersey Hawkins	6 ft 3 in (1.91 m)	190 lb (86 kg)	1966–09–29	Bradley
F	25	Tim James	6 ft 7 in (2.01 m)	212 lb (96 kg)	1976–12–26	Miami (FL)
C	21	Jamaal Magloire	6 ft 11 in (2.11 m)	259 lb (117 kg)	1978–05–21	Kentucky
F	24	Jamal Mashburn	6 ft 8 in (2.03 m)	240 lb (109 kg)	1972–11–29	Kentucky
F	54	Lee Nailon	6 ft 9 in (2.06 m)	238 lb (108 kg)	1975–02–22	TCU
G	3	Eldridge Recasner	6 ft 3 in (1.91 m)	190 lb (86 kg)	1967–12–14	Washington
G/F	32	Eddie Robinson	6 ft 8 in (2.03 m)	210 lb (95 kg)	1976–04–19	Central Oklahoma
F/C	52	Otis Thorpe	6 ft 9 in (2.06 m)	225 lb (102 kg)	1962–08–05	Providence
G	4	David Wesley	6 ft 0 in (1.83 m)	190 lb (86 kg)	1970–11–14	Baylor

Coaches
Head coach
- Paul Silas
Assistant(s)
- Jeff Bower
- Jerry Eaves
- Lee Rose
- Stephen Silas
- Terry Kofler (trainer)

Legend
- (DP) Unsigned draft pick
- (FA) Free agent
- (S) Suspended
- Injured

Roster
Updated: April 10, 2001

== Regular season ==
=== Season standings ===
Central Division	W	L	PCT	GB	Home	Road	Div
y-Milwaukee Bucks	52	30	.634	–	31–10	21–20	19–9
x-Toronto Raptors	47	35	.573	5	27–14	20–21	18–10
x-Charlotte Hornets	46	36	.561	6	28–13	18–23	20–8
x-Indiana Pacers	41	41	.500	11	26–15	15–26	15–13
e-Detroit Pistons	32	50	.390	20	18-23	14–27	16–12
e-Cleveland Cavaliers	30	52	.366	22	20–21	10–31	11–17
e-Atlanta Hawks	25	57	.305	27	18–23	7–34	9–19
e-Chicago Bulls	15	67	.183	37	10–31	5–36	4–24

Eastern Conference
#	Team	W	L	PCT	GB
1	c-Philadelphia 76ers	56	26	.683	–
2	y-Milwaukee Bucks	52	30	.634	4
3	x-Miami Heat	50	32	.610	6
4	x-New York Knicks	48	34	.585	8
5	x-Toronto Raptors	47	35	.573	9
6	x-Charlotte Hornets	46	36	.561	10
7	x-Orlando Magic	43	39	.524	13
8	x-Indiana Pacers	41	41	.500	15
9	e-Boston Celtics	36	46	.439	20
10	e-Detroit Pistons	32	50	.390	24
11	e-Cleveland Cavaliers	30	52	.366	26
12	e-New Jersey Nets	26	56	.317	30
13	e-Atlanta Hawks	25	57	.305	31
14	e-Washington Wizards	19	63	.232	37
15	e-Chicago Bulls	15	67	.183	42

== Playoffs ==
2001 playoff game log
Total: 6–4 (home: 3–1; road: 3–3)
First Round: 3–0 (home: 1–0; road: 2–0)

Game	Date	Team	Score	High points	High rebounds	High assists	Location Attendance	Series
1	April 21	@ Miami	W 106–80	Jamal Mashburn (28)	P. J. Brown (7)	Baron Davis (8)	American Airlines Arena; 20,085	1–0
2	April 23	@ Miami	W 102–76	Jamal Mashburn (22)	P. J. Brown (8)	Baron Davis (4)	American Airlines Arena; 16,500	2–0
3	April 27	Miami	W 94–79	Davis, Mashburn (21)	P. J. Brown (12)	Jamal Mashburn (8)	Charlotte Coliseum; 22,283	3–0

Conference semifinals: 3–4 (home: 2–1; road: 1–3)

Game	Date	Team	Score	High points	High rebounds	High assists	Location Attendance	Series
1	May 6	@ Milwaukee	L 92–104	Jamal Mashburn (23)	Elden Campbell (13)	Baron Davis (7)	Bradley Center; 18,717	0–1
2	May 8	@ Milwaukee	L 90–91	David Wesley (20)	P. J. Brown (11)	David Wesley (7)	Bradley Center; 18,717	0–2
3	May 10	Milwaukee	W 102–92	Jamal Mashburn (36)	P. J. Brown (16)	three players tied (6)	Charlotte Coliseum; 17,392	1–2
4	May 13	Milwaukee	W 85–78	Jamal Mashburn (31)	P. J. Brown (13)	Baron Davis (7)	Charlotte Coliseum; 18,756	2–2
5	May 15	@ Milwaukee	W 94–86	Jamal Mashburn (24)	Elden Campbell (10)	Jamal Mashburn (8)	Bradley Center; 18,717	3–2
6	May 17	Milwaukee	L 97–104	David Wesley (27)	Jamal Mashburn (9)	Jamal Mashburn (7)	Charlotte Coliseum; 23,509	3–3
7	May 20	@ Milwaukee	L 95–104	Baron Davis (29)	Elden Campbell (10)	Jamal Mashburn (9)	Bradley Center; 18,717	3–4

2001 schedule

== Player statistics ==
=== Regular season ===
Player	POS	GP	GS	MP	REB	AST	STL	BLK	PTS	MPG	RPG	APG	SPG	BPG	PPG
Baron Davis	PG	82	82	3,192	408	598	170	36	1,131	38.9	5.0	7.3	2.1	.4	13.8
David Wesley	SG	82	82	3,106	224	361	128	16	1,414	37.9	2.7	4.4	1.6	.2	17.2
P. J. Brown	C	80	79	2,811	742	127	78	92	676	35.1	9.3	1.6	1.0	1.2	8.5
Elden Campbell	PF	78	78	2,337	608	104	60	140	1,022	30.0	7.8	1.3	.8	1.8	13.1
Jamal Mashburn	SF	76	76	2,989	576	411	85	13	1,528	39.3	7.6	5.4	1.1	.2	20.1
Jamaal Magloire	C	74	0	1,095	295	27	18	78	339	14.8	4.0	.4	.2	1.1	4.6
Eddie Robinson	SF	67	6	1,201	198	59	50	32	498	17.9	3.0	.9	.7	.5	7.4
Hersey Hawkins	SG	59	0	681	80	72	33	9	183	11.5	1.4	1.2	.6	.2	3.1
Otis Thorpe	PF	49	4	647	145	29	12	7	138	13.2	3.0	.6	.2	.1	2.8
Eldridge Recasner	PG	43	0	403	50	39	6	1	103	9.4	1.2	.9	.1	.0	2.4
Lee Nailon	SF	42	0	469	92	24	9	5	164	11.2	2.2	.6	.2	.1	3.9
Derrick Coleman	PF	34	3	683	184	39	10	21	277	20.1	5.4	1.1	.3	.6	8.1
Tim James	SF	30	0	197	35	8	2	5	45	6.6	1.2	.3	.1	.2	1.5
Scott Burrell	SF	4	0	41	3	1	3	0	17	10.3	.8	.3	.8	.0	4.3
Terrance Roberson	SF	3	0	13	1	1	0	0	0	4.3	.3	.3	.0	.0	.0
Doug Overton^{†}	PG	2	0	15	0	0	1	0	4	7.5	.0	.0	.5	.0	2.0

- ^{†} Denotes player spent time with another team in the season. Stats reflect time with the Hornets only.

=== Playoffs ===
Player	POS	GP	GS	MP	REB	AST	STL	BLK	PTS	MPG	RPG	APG	SPG	BPG	PPG
Jamal Mashburn	SF	10	10	419	62	57	12	3	249	41.9	6.2	5.7	1.2	.3	24.9
Baron Davis	PG	10	10	397	44	58	28	5	178	39.7	4.4	5.8	2.8	.5	17.8
David Wesley	SG	10	10	394	30	39	16	1	170	39.4	3.0	3.9	1.6	.1	17.0
P. J. Brown	C	10	10	385	100	11	12	14	80	38.5	10.0	1.1	1.2	1.4	8.0
Elden Campbell	PF	10	10	287	79	7	5	11	121	28.7	7.9	.7	.5	1.1	12.1
Eddie Robinson	SF	10	0	192	33	9	4	4	69	19.2	3.3	.9	.4	.4	6.9
Jamaal Magloire	C	10	0	110	28	3	0	6	39	11.0	2.8	.3	.0	.6	3.9
Otis Thorpe	PF	8	0	57	17	0	0	0	4	7.1	2.1	.0	.0	.0	.5
Hersey Hawkins	SG	6	0	50	9	4	3	0	12	8.3	1.5	.7	.5	.0	2.0
Derrick Coleman	PF	5	0	88	25	6	4	2	27	17.6	5.0	1.2	.8	.4	5.4
Scott Burrell	SF	2	0	12	3	1	2	0	5	6.0	1.5	.5	1.0	.0	2.5
Eldridge Recasner	PG	2	0	9	1	2	0	0	3	4.5	.5	1.0	.0	.0	1.5

== Awards and records ==
- P.J. Brown, NBA All-Defensive Second Team
- Baron Davis, longest field goal in NBA history at 89 feet distance on February 17, 2001

== Transactions ==
- August 1, 2000

Traded Ricky Davis, Dale Ellis, Eddie Jones and Anthony Mason to the Miami Heat for P.J. Brown, Rodney Buford, Tim James, Jamal Mashburn and Otis Thorpe.

- September 21, 2000

Signed Hersey Hawkins as a free agent.

- October 2, 2000

Signed Terrance Roberson as a free agent.

Waived Rodney Buford.

- December 19, 2000

Waived Terrance Roberson.

- January 26, 2001

Signed Doug Overton to a 10-day contract.

- April 10, 2001

Signed Scott Burrell to a contract for the rest of the season.

Player Transactions Citation:
