= David Wesley =

American basketball player (born 1970)

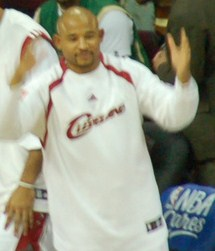
- Wesley in 2006

Personal information
- Born: November 14, 1970 (age 56) San Antonio, Texas, U.S.
- Listed height: 6 ft 1 in (1.85 m)
- Listed weight: 203 lb (92 kg)

Career information
- High school: Longview (Longview, Texas)
- College: Temple JC (1988–1989); Baylor (1989–1992)
- NBA draft: 1992: undrafted
- Playing career: 1992–2007
- Position: Point guard / shooting guard
- Number: 1, 4, 7
- Coaching career: 2010–2012

Career history

Playing
- 1992–1993: Wichita Falls Texans
- 1993–1994: New Jersey Nets
- 1994–1997: Boston Celtics
- 1997–2002: Charlotte Hornets
- 2002–2004: New Orleans Hornets
- 2004–2006: Houston Rockets
- 2006–2007: Cleveland Cavaliers

Coaching
- 2010–2012: Texas Legends (assistant)

Career highlights
- CBA All-Rookie First Team (1993); First-team All-SWC (1992)

Career NBA statistics
- Points: 11,842 (12.5 ppg)
- Rebounds: 2,405 (2.5 rpg)
- Assists: 4,159 (4.4 apg)
- Stats at NBA.com
- Stats at Basketball Reference

David Barakau Wesley (born November 14, 1970) is an American former professional basketball player who played in the National Basketball Association (NBA).

== Early life ==
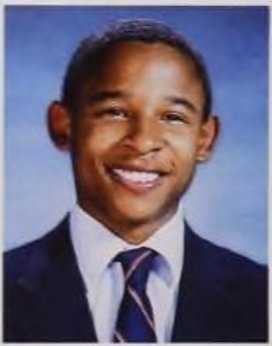
Wesley c. 1987-1988

David graduated from Longview High School in Longview, Texas. He was classmates with former NFL player Bobby Taylor.

== College career ==
Wesley played his freshman year at Temple Junior College, then transferred to Baylor University. Wesley averaged 17 points per game and 4.4 assists per game in 72 total games at Baylor, and left in 1992, 33 hours short of a degree in physical education.

== Professional career ==
=== Wichita Falls Texans (1992–1993) ===
When Wesley left Baylor University in 1992, many scouts considered him too small (at 6'1") to play as a shooting guard in the NBA, and doubted his ability to make the transition to point guard. As a result, Wesley was not selected in the 1992 NBA draft. The Houston Rockets signed him as an undrafted free agent to their extended preseason roster for training camp ahead of the 1992–93 season, but cut Wesley before the season started. He spent that 1992–93 season in the Continental Basketball Association (CBA) playing for the Wichita Falls Texans where he was selected to the CBA All-Rookie First Team.

=== New Jersey Nets, Boston Celtics, Charlotte/New Orleans Hornets, and Houston Rockets (1993–2006) ===
Wesley signed with the New Jersey Nets as a free agent in 1993. He later played for the Boston Celtics, the Charlotte/New Orleans Hornets the Houston Rockets, and the Cleveland Cavaliers. Wesley dispelled the initial doubts about his ability to succeed in the NBA, averaging almost 13 points and 4.6 assists per game over a 14-year career, including ten straight seasons with double-digit scoring averages (1995–96 through 2004–05). He received praise as a tenacious man-to-man defender, and a reliable outside shooter. Wesley played in 55 playoff games and scored double figures in more than half of them.

=== Cleveland Cavaliers (2006–2007) ===
During the 2006–07 season, Wesley only played for 35 games and averaged career-lows of 2.1 points, 1.0 rebounds and 1.1 assists. He also did not play any minutes during the playoffs.

On September 29, 2007, Wesley was traded back to the Hornets for Cedric Simmons. On October 29, 2007, the New Jersey Nets reacquired guard David Wesley from the New Orleans Hornets for swingman Bernard Robinson, center Mile Ilić and cash considerations. On November 1, 2007, not even a week after the Nets signed him, he was waived. A few days later, Wesley stated he planned on ending his NBA career. His 11,842 career points rank second all-time behind Moses Malone among undrafted NBA players.

== NBA career statistics ==
Legend
GP	Games played	GS	Games started	MPG	Minutes per game
FG%	Field goal percentage	3P%	3-point field goal percentage	FT%	Free throw percentage
RPG	Rebounds per game	APG	Assists per game	SPG	Steals per game
BPG	Blocks per game	PPG	Points per game	**Bold**	Career high
*	Led the league

=== Regular season ===
Year	Team	GP	GS	MPG	FG%	3P%	FT%	RPG	APG	SPG	BPG	PPG
1993–94	New Jersey	60	0	9.0	.368	.234	.830	.7	2.1	.6	.1	3.1
1994–95	Boston	51	36	27.1	.409	**.429**	.755	2.3	5.2	1.6	.2	7.4
1995–96	Boston	**82**	53	25.7	.459	.426	.753	3.2	4.8	1.2	.1	12.3
1996–97	Boston	74	73	**40.4**	**.468**	.360	.781	**3.6**	**7.3**	**2.2**	.2	16.8
1997–98	Charlotte	81	81	35.1	.443	.347	.795	2.6	6.5	1.7	**.4**	13.0
1998–99	Charlotte	50*	50*	37.0	.446	.359	.832	3.2	6.4	2.0	.2	14.1
1999–00	Charlotte	**82**	**82***	33.7	.426	.355	.778	2.7	5.6	1.3	.1	13.6
2000–01	Charlotte	**82**	**82***	37.9	.422	.376	.799	2.7	4.4	1.6	.2	**17.2**
2001–02	Charlotte	67	63	37.1	.400	.332	.734	2.1	3.5	1.1	.2	14.2
2002–03	New Orleans	73	73	37.1	.433	.424	.781	2.4	3.4	1.5	.1	16.7
2003–04	New Orleans	61	60	32.8	.389	.323	.753	2.2	2.9	1.2	.2	14.0
2004–05	New Orleans	26	26	35.9	.389	.350	**.882**	3.3	4.2	1.3	.0	13.9
2004–05	Houston	54	53	34.1	.404	.383	.841	2.6	2.9	1.1	.1	10.9
2005–06	Houston	71	59	33.4	.403	.365	.807	2.5	2.9	.8	.1	9.9
2006–07	Cleveland	35	5	10.1	.293	.237	.714	1.0	1.1	.3	.1	2.1
Career		949	796	31.9	.424	.368	.786	2.5	4.4	1.3	.2	12.5

=== Playoffs ===
Year	Team	GP	GS	MPG	FG%	3P%	FT%	RPG	APG	SPG	BPG	PPG
1994	New Jersey	3	0	6.0	.429	.250	**1.000**	.0	1.0	.7	.0	3.0
1998	Charlotte	9	9	31.7	.398	.429	.714	2.0	**6.7**	.8	.0	10.0
2000	Charlotte	4	4	38.0	.333	.300	1.000	**3.0**	4.8	**2.0**	.0	11.0
2001	Charlotte	**10**	**10**	39.4	**.470**	.394	.756	**3.0**	3.9	1.6	.1	**17.0**
2002	Charlotte	9	9	**41.8**	.403	.447	.913	1.9	3.4	1.1	**.2**	15.8
2003	New Orleans	6	6	30.8	.403	.412	**1.000**	1.2	2.2	.8	**.2**	13.2
2004	New Orleans	7	7	34.7	.324	.367	.714	2.3	2.4	.7	.0	10.6
2005	Houston	7	7	39.9	.352	**.476**	.692	**3.0**	3.3	1.3	.1	8.1
Career		55	52	35.1	.398	.408	.796	2.2	3.7	1.1	.1	12.1

== Coaching ==
Wesley was an assistant coach for the Texas Legends of the NBA D-League from 2010 to 2012.

== Broadcasting ==
On August 6, 2012, it was announced that Wesley would join the Fox Sports New Orleans team in broadcasting New Orleans Hornets games. (Since then, the team has been renamed the New Orleans Pelicans.) He was hired to be the Pelicans television color analyst. He was eventually replaced by Antonio Daniels prior to the start of the 2019–20 NBA season.

== Personal ==
He is the cousin of former NBA player Michael Dickerson.

Wesley was charged in 2000 with misdemeanor reckless driving in the crash that killed his friend and teammate Bobby Phills. A Charlotte-Mecklenburg Police report said Phills was speeding at more than 100 mph (160 km/h) when he lost control and crossed into oncoming traffic and collided with a car. The report said both Phills and Wesley were driving "in an erratic, reckless, careless, negligent and/or aggressive manner". In a non-jury trial, a judge acquitted Wesley of the charge of racing Phills.

== See also ==
- List of NBA franchise career scoring leaders
