= Stromile Swift =

American basketball player (born 1979)

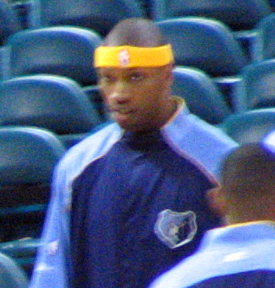
- Swift in with the Memphis Grizzlies in 2005

Personal information
- Born: November 21, 1979 (age 46) Shreveport, Louisiana, U.S.
- Listed height: 6 ft 10 in (2.08 m)
- Listed weight: 220 lb (100 kg)

Career information
- High school: Fair Park (Shreveport, Louisiana)
- College: LSU (1998–2000)
- NBA draft: 2000: 1st round, 2nd overall pick
- Drafted by: Vancouver Grizzlies
- Playing career: 2000–2010
- Position: Power forward / center
- Number: 4, 6

Career history
- 2000–2005: Vancouver/Memphis Grizzlies
- 2005–2006: Houston Rockets
- 2006–2008: Memphis Grizzlies
- 2008–2009: New Jersey Nets
- 2009: Phoenix Suns
- 2009–2010: Shandong Lions

Career highlights
- CBA All-Star (2010); Consensus second-team All-American (2000); SEC Co-Player of the Year – AP (2000); First-team Parade All-American (1998); McDonald's All-American (1998); Louisiana Mr. Basketball (1998)
- Stats at NBA.com
- Stats at Basketball Reference

Stromile Emanuel Swift (/ˈstroʊmaɪl/ STROH-myle; born November 21, 1979) is an American former professional basketball player. He played college basketball for the LSU Tigers before being selected second overall by the Vancouver Grizzlies in the 2000 NBA draft. At 6'10" and 220 lbs, he played the power forward and center positions.

== College career ==
Swift spent his college career at Louisiana State University, where he led the Tigers to the Sweet 16 round of the NCAA Men's Basketball Tournament his sophomore year, during the time when the LSU men's basketball program was under probation and had limited scholarships available.

== Professional career ==
=== Vancouver / Memphis Grizzlies (2000–2005) ===
Swift was selected second overall in the 2000 NBA draft by the Vancouver Grizzlies. His debut game was played on October 31, 2000, in a 94–88 win over the Seattle SuperSonics. Swift played for nine minutes and the only stat he recorded was one rebound.

For his sophomore season, the Grizzlies relocated to Memphis and although he did not become a consistent starter for the team (starting in 14 out of 68 games played), he saw a drastic increase in minutes (16.4 to 26.5 per game). This season was Swift's most productive season of his career, as he averaged his highest points (11.8), rebounds (6.3) and blocks per game (1.7). In this same season he competed in the 2001 Slam Dunk Competition against Baron Davis, DeShawn Stevenson, Corey Maggette, Desmond Mason, and Jonathan Bender. Swift placed fourth as Mason, of the Seattle SuperSonics, won the competition.

On April 17, 2002, Swift scored a career-high 31 points and grabbed 10 rebounds in a loss against the Seattle SuperSonics.

=== Houston Rockets (2005–2006) ===
After the 2004–05 season, Swift left the Grizzlies as a free agent and signed a four-year, $22 million contract with the Houston Rockets. At the time of his departure to Houston for the 2005–06 season, Swift was the last remaining player on the Grizzlies roster to have moved with the team from Vancouver.

=== Return to Memphis (2006–2008) ===
In 2006, Swift was traded back to the Memphis Grizzlies along with the rights to the #8 draft pick Rudy Gay in exchange for Shane Battier, in a draft day trade. For some time, he was their starting center.

On January 3, 2007, Swift's 26 points helped lead (teammate Mike Miller had 33 points) the Grizzlies to a 144–135 victory against the Golden State Warriors.

=== New Jersey Nets (2008–2009) ===
On February 4, 2008, Swift was traded to the New Jersey Nets for Jason Collins and cash considerations. Four days later, Swift played his first minutes with the Nets, scoring his first basket late in the game, on a jumper, against the Charlotte Bobcats. In the game against the Minnesota Timberwolves, on February 12, he scored on an alley-oop dunk from Jason Kidd, in the only game they would see time on the court together in a Nets uniform, as Kidd would be traded to the Dallas Mavericks shortly thereafter.

On March 1, 2009, Swift was waived by the Nets.

=== Phoenix Suns (2009) ===
On March 4, 2009, the Phoenix Suns signed Swift for the remainder of the season. Swift played 13 games for the Suns during the remainder of the year, and averaged 2.0 points and 2.5 rebounds. Swift's final NBA game was played on April 11, in a 110–97 win over the Minnesota Timberwolves where he recorded two points, one rebound, and one block.

=== Shandong Lions (2009–2010) ===
Swift signed with the Philadelphia 76ers in September 2009, but was released on October 12, 2009.

Swift signed with the Shandong Lions of the Chinese Basketball Association in December 2009, and made his debut the same month.

== NBA career statistics ==
Legend
GP	Games played	GS	Games started	MPG	Minutes per game
FG%	Field goal percentage	3P%	3-point field goal percentage	FT%	Free throw percentage
RPG	Rebounds per game	APG	Assists per game	SPG	Steals per game
BPG	Blocks per game	PPG	Points per game	**Bold**	Career high

=== Regular season ===
Year	Team	GP	GS	MPG	FG%	3P%	FT%	RPG	APG	SPG	BPG	PPG
2000–01	Vancouver	**80**	6	16.4	.451	.000	.603	3.6	.4	**.8**	1.0	4.9
2001–02	Memphis	68	14	**26.5**	.480	.000	.711	**6.3**	**.7**	**.8**	**1.7**	**11.8**
2002–03	Memphis	67	**26**	22.1	.481	.000	.722	5.7	**.7**	**.8**	1.6	9.7
2003–04	Memphis	77	10	19.8	.469	.250	.725	4.9	.5	.7	1.5	9.4
2004–05	Memphis	60	14	21.3	.449	.000	**.758**	4.6	**.7**	.7	1.5	10.1
2005–06	Houston	66	5	20.4	.491	.000	.651	4.4	.4	.6	.8	8.9
2006–07	Memphis	54	18	19.1	.465	.000	.724	4.6	.3	.6	1.1	7.8
2007–08	Memphis	35	4	15.7	.525	.000	.642	3.7	.6	.3	1.0	6.8
2007–08	New Jersey	21	0	14.0	.477	.000	.750	3.3	.2	.2	.9	5.0
2008–09	New Jersey	6	0	10.7	**.600**	.000	.455	2.2	.2	.0	.3	3.8
2008–09	Phoenix	13	0	9.3	.366	**1.000**	.533	2.5	.2	.3	.5	3.0
Career		547	97	19.8	.473	.074	.699	4.6	.5	.6	1.2	8.4

=== Playoffs ===
Year	Team	GP	GS	MPG	FG%	3P%	FT%	RPG	APG	SPG	BPG	PPG
2004	Memphis	**4**	0	**18.5**	.346	.000	**.750**	**4.8**	**.8**	**.8**	**1.5**	6.0
2005	Memphis	3	0	16.0	**.600**	.000	.571	4.7	.3	.3	.0	**9.3**
Career		7	0	17.4	.457	.000	.667	4.7	.6	.6	.9	7.4

== Legal issues ==
On February 22, 2011, Swift was arrested in his hometown of Shreveport, Louisiana, on charges of aggravated assault and improper telephone communications. He was later released on bail.

On May 20, 2011, Swift was arrested again in Shreveport on a charge of stalking. He pled guilty to the charge in July 2012 and received a suspended six-month sentence and a year and a half of supervised probation.
