= 2000–01 Denver Nuggets season =

NBA professional basketball team season

- Head coach: Dan Issel
- General manager: Dan Issel
- Owner: Stan Kroenke
- Arena: Pepsi Center

Results
- Record: 40–42 (.488)
- Place: Division: 6th (Midwest); Conference: 11th (Western)
- Playoff finish: Did not qualify
- Stats at Basketball Reference

Local media
- Television: KTVD; Fox Sports Net Rocky Mountain
- Radio: KKFN

The 2000–01 Denver Nuggets season was the 25th season for the Denver Nuggets in the National Basketball Association, and their 34th season as a franchise.

== Season summary ==
=== Off-season ===
During the off-season, the Nuggets acquired Calbert Cheaney, and former Nuggets guard Robert Pack from the Boston Celtics, acquired Voshon Lenard from the Miami Heat, and acquired Tracy Murray from the Washington Wizards. The team also re-signed free agent and former Nuggets guard Anthony Goldwire.

=== Regular season ===
With the addition of Lenard, the Nuggets got off to a 10–8 start to the regular season, then lost five straight games, but then won 14 of their next 17 games, and were a playoff contender posting a record of 26–18 as of January 27, 2001. However, Cheaney only played just nine games due to a strained left hamstring, and Tariq Abdul-Wahad only played just 29 games due to weight problems. At mid-season, the Nuggets traded Murray and Keon Clark to the Toronto Raptors in exchange for Kevin Willis. The team held a 27–24 record at the All-Star break. However, the Nuggets lost 24 of their final 38 games of the season, and finished in sixth place in the Midwest Division with a 40–42 record, missing the NBA playoffs for the sixth consecutive year.

Antonio McDyess averaged 20.8 points, 12.1 rebounds and 1.5 blocks per game, while Nick Van Exel averaged 17.7 points and 8.5 assists per game, and also contributed 135 three-point field goals, and Raef LaFrentz provided the team with 12.9 points, 7.8 rebounds and 2.6 blocks per game. In addition, Lenard contributed 12.2 points per game, and led the Nuggets with 147 three-point field goals, while sixth man George McCloud contributed 9.6 points per game off the bench, and Willis provided with 9.6 points and 7.2 rebounds per game in 43 games after the trade. Meanwhile, second-year forward James Posey averaged 8.1 points and 5.3 rebounds per game, and Pack contributed 6.5 points and 4.0 assists per game.

During the NBA All-Star weekend at the MCI Center in Washington, D.C., McDyess was selected for the 2001 NBA All-Star Game, as a member of the Western Conference All-Star team; it was his first and only All-Star appearance. The Nuggets finished 20th in the NBA in home-game attendance, with an attendance of 619,300 at the Pepsi Center during the regular season.

=== Aftermath ===
Following the season, Willis was traded to the Milwaukee Bucks, who then sent him back to his former team, the Houston Rockets, and Pack and Goldwire were both released to free agency.

== Draft picks ==
Round	Pick	Player	Position	Nationality	School/Club team
1	26	Mamadou N'diaye	C	Senegal	Auburn
2	53	Dan McClintock	C	United States	Northern Arizona

== Roster ==
2000–01 Denver Nuggets roster
Players

Pos.	No.	Player	Height	Weight	DOB	From
G/F	9	Tariq Abdul-Wahad	6 ft 6 in (1.98 m)	223 lb (101 kg)	1974–11–03	San José State
F	42	Ryan Bowen	6 ft 7 in (2.01 m)	215 lb (98 kg)	1975–11–20	Iowa
G/F	29	Calbert Cheaney	6 ft 7 in (2.01 m)	209 lb (95 kg)	1971–07–17	Indiana
F	54	Terry Davis	6 ft 9 in (2.06 m)	225 lb (102 kg)	1967–06–17	Virginia Union
G	5	Anthony Goldwire	6 ft 1 in (1.85 m)	182 lb (83 kg)	1971–09–06	Houston
F/C	45	Raef LaFrentz	6 ft 11 in (2.11 m)	240 lb (109 kg)	1976–05–29	Kansas
G	5	Voshon Lenard	6 ft 4 in (1.93 m)	205 lb (93 kg)	1973–05–14	Minnesota
C	50	Dan McClintock	7 ft 0 in (2.13 m)	270 lb (122 kg)	1977–04–19	Northern Arizona
F	21	George McCloud	6 ft 6 in (1.98 m)	205 lb (93 kg)	1967–05–27	Florida State
F/C	24	Antonio McDyess	6 ft 9 in (2.06 m)	220 lb (100 kg)	1974–09–07	Alabama
G	14	Robert Pack	6 ft 2 in (1.88 m)	180 lb (82 kg)	1969–02–03	USC
G/F	41	James Posey	6 ft 8 in (2.03 m)	215 lb (98 kg)	1977–01–13	Xavier
G	31	Nick Van Exel	6 ft 1 in (1.85 m)	170 lb (77 kg)	1971–11–27	Cincinnati
F/C	43	Kevin Willis	7 ft 0 in (2.13 m)	220 lb (100 kg)	1962–09–06	Michigan State

Coaches
Head coach
- Dan Issel
Assistant(s)
- Louie Dampier
- Mike Evans
- Kim Hughes
- John Lucas

Legend
- (DP) Unsigned draft pick
- (FA) Free agent
- (S) Suspended
- Injured

Roster

== Regular season ==
=== Season standings ===
Midwest Division	W	L	PCT	GB	Home	Road	Div
z-San Antonio Spurs	58	24	.707	–	33–8	25–16	19–5
x-Utah Jazz	53	29	.646	5	28–13	25–16	14–10
x-Dallas Mavericks	53	29	.646	5	28–13	25–16	14–10
x-Minnesota Timberwolves	47	35	.573	11	30–11	17–24	11–13
e-Houston Rockets	45	37	.549	13	24–17	21–20	11–13
e-Denver Nuggets	40	42	.488	18	29–12	11–30	13–11
e-Vancouver Grizzlies	23	59	.280	35	15–26	8–33	2–22

Western Conference
#	Team	W	L	PCT	GB
1	z-San Antonio Spurs	58	24	.707	–
2	y-Los Angeles Lakers	56	26	.683	2
3	x-Sacramento Kings	55	27	.671	3
4	x-Utah Jazz	53	29	.646	5
5	x-Dallas Mavericks	53	29	.646	5
6	x-Phoenix Suns	51	31	.622	7
7	x-Portland Trail Blazers	50	32	.610	8
8	x-Minnesota Timberwolves	47	35	.573	11
9	e-Houston Rockets	45	37	.549	13
10	e-Seattle SuperSonics	44	38	.537	14
11	e-Denver Nuggets	40	42	.488	18
12	e-Los Angeles Clippers	31	51	.378	27
13	e-Vancouver Grizzlies	23	59	.280	35
14	e-Golden State Warriors	17	65	.207	41

z - clinched division title
y - clinched division title
x - clinched playoff spot

== Player statistics ==
Legend
GP	Games played	GS	Games started	MPG	Minutes per game
FG%	Field-goal percentage	3P%	3-point field-goal percentage	FT%	Free-throw percentage
RPG	Rebounds per game	APG	Assists per game	SPG	Steals per game
BPG	Blocks per game	PPG	Points per game

=== Regular season ===
Player	GP	GS	MPG	FG%	3FG%	FT%	RPG	APG	SPG	BPG	PPG
Antonio McDyess	70	70	36.5	.495		.700	12.1	2.1	0.6	1.5	20.8
Nick Van Exel	71	70	37.9	.414	.377	.819	3.4	8.5	0.9	0.3	17.7
Raef LaFrentz	78	74	31.5	.477	.367	.698	7.8	1.4	0.5	2.6	12.9
Voshon Lenard	80	58	29.1	.397	.385	.797	2.9	2.4	0.8	0.2	12.2
George McCloud	76	8	26.4	.382	.329	.840	2.9	3.7	0.7	0.4	9.6
Kevin Willis	43	13	24.6	.428	.250	.788	7.2	0.7	0.9	0.7	9.6
James Posey	82	82	27.5	.412	.300	.816	5.3	2.0	1.1	0.5	8.1
Keon Clark	35	3	21.5	.412		.600	5.3	1.0	0.5	1.3	6.5
Robert Pack	74	11	17.0	.425	.387	.766	1.9	4.0	0.9	0.0	6.5
Mark Strickland	46	2	11.2	.443	.000	.627	2.6	0.4	0.3	0.4	4.4
Anthony Goldwire	20	0	10.1	.375	.265	.765	0.6	1.7	0.5	0.0	4.1
Tariq Abdul-Wahad	29	12	14.5	.387	.400	.583	2.0	0.8	0.5	0.4	3.8
Tracy Murray	13	0	10.4	.309	.304	.900	1.7	0.7	0.3	0.1	3.8
Ryan Bowen	57	0	12.2	.556	.364	.614	2.0	0.5	0.6	0.2	3.4
Dan McClintock	6	1	9.7	.500		.000	2.8	0.2	0.0	0.3	3.0
Calbert Cheaney	9	5	17.0	.333		.500	2.2	1.0	0.4	0.2	2.3
Terry Davis	19	1	12.0	.480		.409	2.8	0.4	0.1	0.1	1.7
Garth Joseph	2	0	4.0	.000		.000	0.0	0.0	0.0	0.5	0.0

Player statistics citation:

== Awards and records ==
Antonio McDyess- 2001 All Star Selection

== See also ==
- 2000-01 NBA season
