= 2000–01 Golden State Warriors season =

NBA professional basketball team season

- Head coach: Dave Cowens
- Owners: Chris Cohan
- Arena: The Arena in Oakland

Results
- Record: 17–65 (.207)
- Place: Division: 7th (Pacific); Conference: 14th (Western)
- Playoff finish: Did not qualify
- Stats at Basketball Reference

The 2000–01 Golden State Warriors season was the 55th season for the Golden State Warriors in the National Basketball Association, and their 39th season in the San Francisco Bay Area.

== Season summary ==
=== Off-season ===
During the off-season, the Warriors re-signed free agent and former Warriors All-Star forward Chris Mullin, acquired Danny Fortson from the Boston Celtics, and acquired Bob Sura from the Cleveland Cavaliers in a three-team trade. However, Fortson would only play just six games due to a foot injury. The Warriors also hired Dave Cowens as their new head coach.

=== Regular season ===
Under Cowens, and with the addition of Fortson and Sura, the Warriors won their season opener by defeating the Phoenix Suns, 96–94 on October 31, 2000. However, their struggles continued as the team posted a 7-game losing streak afterwards. Mullin, Sura, Larry Hughes, Chris Mills, Erick Dampier, Adonal Foyle and rookie center Marc Jackson, all missed large parts of the regular season due to injuries. After holding a 15–33 record at the All-Star break, the Warriors lost 32 of their final 34 games, including a 13-game losing streak to end their season, finishing in last place in the Pacific Division with a dismal 17–65 record, and missing the NBA playoffs for the seventh consecutive year.

Antawn Jamison had a stellar season averaging 24.9 points, 8.7 rebounds and 1.4 steals per game, while Fortson averaged 16.7 points and 16.3 rebounds per game during his short six-game stint, and Hughes provided the team with 16.5 points, 5.5 rebounds, 4.5 assists and 1.9 steals per game in 50 games. In addition, Jackson averaged 13.2 points and 7.5 rebounds per game in 48 games, and was named to the NBA All-Rookie First Team, while Mills contributed 12.0 points and 6.2 rebounds per game in 15 games, Sura provided with 11.1 points and 4.6 assists per game in 53 games, and Mookie Blaylock contributed 11.0 points, 6.7 assists and 2.4 steals per game. Meanwhile, rookie small forward, and second-round draft pick Chris Porter averaged 8.6 points and 3.7 rebounds per game in 51 games, Dampier provided with 7.4 points, 5.8 rebounds and 1.4 blocks per game in 43 games, second-year guard Vonteego Cummings contributed 7.3 points and 3.4 assists per game, and Adonal Foyle averaged 5.9 points, 7.0 rebounds and 2.7 blocks per game in 58 games.

During the NBA All-Star weekend at the MCI Center in Washington, D.C., Jackson was selected for the NBA Rookie Challenge Game, as a member of the Rookies team. Jackson also finished in third place in Rookie of the Year voting. The Warriors finished 25th in the NBA in home-game attendance, with an attendance of 591,981 at The Arena in Oakland during the regular season, which was the fifth-lowest in the league.

=== Aftermath ===
Following the season, Mullin retired after his second stint with the Warriors, and Cummings was traded to the Philadelphia 76ers.

== Offseason ==
=== Draft picks ===
Round	Pick	Player	Position	Nationality	College
2	55	Chris Porter	SF	United States	Auburn

== Roster ==
2000–01 Golden State Warriors roster
Players

Pos.	No.	Player	Height	Weight	DOB	From
G	10	Mookie Blaylock	6 ft 0 in (1.83 m)	180 lb (82 kg)		Oklahoma
F/C	40	Corie Blount	6 ft 9 in (2.06 m)	240 lb (109 kg)		Cincinnati
G	5	Vonteego Cummings	6 ft 3 in (1.91 m)	185 lb (84 kg)		Pittsburgh
C	25	Erick Dampier	6 ft 11 in (2.11 m)	265 lb (120 kg)		Mississippi State
F/C	21	Danny Fortson (injured)	6 ft 7 in (2.01 m)	260 lb (118 kg)		Cincinnati
C	31	Adonal Foyle	6 ft 10 in (2.08 m)	270 lb (122 kg)		Colgate
G	2	Chris Garner	5 ft 10 in (1.78 m)	156 lb (71 kg)		Memphis
G/F	20	Larry Hughes	6 ft 5 in (1.96 m)	184 lb (83 kg)		Saint Louis
C	44	Marc Jackson	6 ft 10 in (2.08 m)	270 lb (122 kg)		Temple
F	33	Antawn Jamison	6 ft 8 in (2.03 m)	223 lb (101 kg)		North Carolina
F	32	Adam Keefe	6 ft 9 in (2.06 m)	230 lb (104 kg)		Stanford
G	23	Paul McPherson	6 ft 4 in (1.93 m)	210 lb (95 kg)		DePaul
F	34	Chris Mills (injured)	6 ft 6 in (1.98 m)	215 lb (98 kg)		Arizona
F	17	Chris Mullin (injured)	6 ft 6 in (1.98 m)	200 lb (91 kg)		St. John's
F	4	Chris Porter	6 ft 7 in (2.01 m)	218 lb (99 kg)		Auburn
G	3	Bob Sura	6 ft 5 in (1.96 m)	200 lb (91 kg)		Florida State

Coaches
Head coach
- Dave Cowens
Assistant(s)
- Phil Hubbard
- Mark Osowski
- Clifford Ray
- Brian Winters

Legend
- (DP) Unsigned draft pick
- (FA) Free agent
- (S) Suspended
- Injured

Roster

== Regular season ==
=== Season standings ===
Pacific Division	W	L	PCT	GB	Home	Road	Div
y-Los Angeles Lakers	56	26	.683	–	31–10	25–16	14–10
x-Sacramento Kings	55	27	.671	1	33–8	22–19	16–8
x-Phoenix Suns	51	31	.622	5	31–10	20–21	12–12
x-Portland Trail Blazers	50	32	.610	6	28–13	22–19	12–12
e-Seattle SuperSonics	44	38	.537	12	26–15	18–23	17–7
e-Los Angeles Clippers	31	51	378	25	22–19	9–32	9–15
e-Golden State Warriors	17	65	.207	39	11–30	6–35	4–20

Western Conference
#	Team	W	L	PCT	GB
1	z-San Antonio Spurs	58	24	.707	–
2	y-Los Angeles Lakers	56	26	.683	2
3	x-Sacramento Kings	55	27	.671	3
4	x-Utah Jazz	53	29	.646	5
5	x-Dallas Mavericks	53	29	.646	5
6	x-Phoenix Suns	51	31	.622	7
7	x-Portland Trail Blazers	50	32	.610	8
8	x-Minnesota Timberwolves	47	35	.573	11
9	e-Houston Rockets	45	37	.549	13
10	e-Seattle SuperSonics	44	38	.537	14
11	e-Denver Nuggets	40	42	.488	18
12	e-Los Angeles Clippers	31	51	.378	27
13	e-Vancouver Grizzlies	23	59	.280	35
14	e-Golden State Warriors	17	65	.207	41

z - clinched division title
y - clinched division title
x - clinched playoff spot

=== Game log ===
2000–01 game log
Total: 17-65 (home: 11-30; road: 6-35)
October: 1–0 (home: 1–0; road: 0–0)

Game	Date	Team	Score	High points	High rebounds	High assists	Location Attendance	Record
1	October 31	Phoenix	W 96–94	Chris Mills (19)	Danny Fortson (18)	Larry Hughes (5)	The Arena in Oakland; 15,460	1–0

November: 3–0 (home: 1–0; road: 2–0)

Game	Date	Team	Score	High points	High rebounds	High assists	Location Attendance	Record
2	November 2	@ Denver	L 97–101	Larry Hughes (21)	Danny Fortson (13)	Mookie Blaylock (6)	Pepsi Center; 15,790	1–1
3	November 4	San Antonio	L 105–117	Antawn Jamison (32)	Danny Fortson (11)	Vonteego Cummings (7)	The Arena in Oakland; 16,121	1–2
4	November 8	@ Sacramento	L 84–117	Danny Fortson (17)	Danny Fortson (14)	Vinny Del Negro (8)	ARCO Arena; 17,317	1–3
5	November 10	Sacramento	L 107–114	Antawn Jamison (37)	Danny Fortson (17)	Larry Hughes (8)	The Arena in Oakland; 17,467	1–4
6	November 12	Orlando	L 99–105 (OT)	Antawn Jamison (23)	Danny Fortson (21)	Mookie Blaylock (15)	The Arena in Oakland; 13,626	1–5
7	November 14	@ Cleveland	L 86–96	Antawn Jamison (25)	Antawn Jamison (11)	Mookie Blaylock (7)	Gund Arena; 13,691	1–6
8	November 15	@ Minnesota	L 90–92	Larry Hughes (22)	Erick Dampier (16)	Mookie Blaylock (8)	Target Center; 16,034	1–7
9	November 17	@ Indiana	W 92–90	Antawn Jamison (28)	Adam Keefe (12)	Mookie Blaylock (7)	Conseco Fieldhouse; 17,101	2–7
10	November 19	@ New York	L 71–88	Larry Hughes (17)	Chris Mills (7)	Mookie Blaylock (5)	Madison Square Garden; 19,763	2–8
12	November 22	@ L.A. Lakers	L 91–111	Antawn Jamison (28)	Antawn Jamison (10)	Vinny Del Negro (6)	STAPLES Center; 18,208	3–9

2000–01 schedule

== Player statistics ==
Legend
GP	Games played	GS	Games started	MPG	Minutes per game
FG%	Field-goal percentage	3P%	3-point field-goal percentage	FT%	Free-throw percentage
RPG	Rebounds per game	APG	Assists per game	SPG	Steals per game
BPG	Blocks per game	PPG	Points per game

=== Regular season ===
Player	GP	GS	MPG	FG%	3P%	FT%	RPG	APG	SPG	BPG	PPG
Antawn Jamison	82	82	41.4	.442	.302	.715	8.7	2.0	1.4	.3	24.9
Mookie Blaylock	69	59	34.1	.396	.324	.697	3.9	6.7	2.4	.3	11.0
Adam Keefe	67	13	12.5	.403	.333	.619	3.1	.5	.4	.3	2.5
Vonteego Cummings	66	11	22.7	.344	.336	.681	2.1	3.4	1.0	.2	7.3
Adonal Foyle	58	37	25.1	.416		.441	7.0	.8	.5	2.7	5.9
Bob Sura	53	42	31.8	.390	.273	.714	4.3	4.6	1.0	.2	11.1
Chris Porter	51	35	22.5	.389	.000	.667	3.7	1.2	.9	.1	8.6
Larry Hughes	50	45	36.9	.383	.187	.766	5.5	4.5	1.9	.6	16.5
Marc Jackson	48	35	29.4	.467	.217	.802	7.5	1.2	.7	.6	13.2
Erick Dampier	43	26	24.1	.401	.000	.532	5.8	1.4	.4	1.3	7.4
Corie Blount^{†}	38	0	24.2	.433	.250	.632	8.3	1.3	.8	.4	6.8
Vinny Del Negro^{†}	29	1	13.7	.333	.111	1.000	1.1	2.1	.2	.0	2.7
Paul McPherson^{†}	22	0	13.0	.517	.333	.706	1.4	1.0	.6	.0	6.8
Chris Mullin	20	8	18.7	.340	.365	.857	2.1	1.0	.8	.5	5.8
Chris Mills	15	8	32.9	.372	.280	.861	6.2	1.2	.6	.3	12.0
Bill Curley^{†}	15	2	11.8	.558	1.000	.733	2.5	.2	.4	.5	4.0
Chris Garner	8	0	18.6	.189	.000	.833	1.5	2.3	.9	.1	2.4
Danny Fortson	6	6	33.8	.580		.778	16.3	.8	.3	.0	16.7
Chucky Brown^{†}	6	0	12.3	.450	.000	.600	3.0	.8	.5	.2	4.0
John Coker	6	0	5.3	.125			.8	.3	.2	.0	.3
Rubén Garcés^{†}	3	0	3.7	.000			2.3	.3	.3	.3	.0
Randy Livingston	2	0	3.5	.000	.000		.5	.5	.0	.0	.0

- ^{†} Denotes player spent time with another team in the season. Stats reflect time with the Warriors only.

Player statistics citation:

== Awards and records ==
- Marc Jackson was selected to the All-Rookie First Team.

== Transactions ==
=== Trades ===
June 27, 2000	To Golden State Warriors Vinny Del Negro (From Milwaukee); Bob Sura (From Cleveland) To Cleveland Cavaliers J. R. Reid (From Milwaukee); Robert Traylor (From Milwaukee)	To Milwaukee Bucks Jason Caffey (From Golden State); Billy Owens (From Golden State)

August 16, 2000	To Golden State Warriors Danny Fortson (From Boston); Adam Keefe (From Utah) To Boston Celtics Robert Pack (From Dallas); Hot Rod Williams (From Dallas); 2001 first-round pick (From Utah); Cash (From Dallas)	To Dallas Mavericks Bill Curley (From Golden State); Dana Barros (From Boston); Howard Eisley (From Utah) To Utah Jazz Donyell Marshall (From Golden State); Bruno Šundov (From Dallas)

January 26, 2001	To Golden State Warriors Corie Blount; Rubén Garcés; Paul McPherson	To Phoenix Suns Vinny Del Negro

=== Free agents ===
Additions
Player	Date signed	Former team
Chris Mullin	September 28	Indiana Pacers
Jerod Ward	September 30	Richmond Rhythm (IBL)
Marc Jackson	September 30	Cantabria Lobos (Spain)
Rick Hughes	September 30	Dallas Mavericks
Yinka Dare	September 30	Fort Wayne Fury (CBA)
Randy Livingston	November 15	Phoenix Suns
Bill Curley	December 1	Dallas Mavericks
John Coker	December 20	Quad City Thunder (CBA)
Bill Curley (10-day)	January 5	Golden State Warriors
John Coker (10-day)	January 8	Golden State Warriors
Chucky Brown (10-day)	January 13	Charlotte Hornets
Chris Garner (10-day)	April 6	Quad City Thunder (CBA)
Chris Garner (rest of season)	April 16	Golden State Warriors

Subtractions
Player	Date signed	New Team
Terry Cummings	October 2	retired
Jerod Ward	October 16	Los Angeles Stars (ABA)
Rick Hughes	October 16	N/A
Yinka Dare	October 16	none
Randy Livingston	November 21	Idaho Stampede (CBA)
Bill Curley	January 3	Golden State Warriors
John Coker	January 3	Golden State Warriors
Chucky Brown	January 26	Cleveland Cavaliers
Rubén Garcés	February 28	ASVEL Villeurbanne (France)

Player Transactions Citation:

== See also ==
- 2000-01 NBA season
