= 2000–01 Utah Jazz season =

NBA professional basketball team season

- Head coach: Jerry Sloan
- Arena: Delta Center

Results
- Record: 53–29 (.646)
- Place: Division: 2nd (Midwest); Conference: 4th (Western)
- Playoff finish: First round (lost to Mavericks 2-3)
- Stats at Basketball Reference

Local media
- Television: KJZZ-TV; Fox Sports Net Utah
- Radio: KFNZ

The 2000–01 Utah Jazz season was the 27th season for the Utah Jazz in the National Basketball Association, and their 22nd season in Salt Lake City, Utah.

== Season summary ==
=== Off-season ===
After the retirement of Jeff Hornacek, the Jazz signed free agents Danny Manning, and John Starks, and acquired Donyell Marshall from the Golden State Warriors in a four-team trade. The team also re-signed former Jazz forward David Benoit, and former Jazz guard John Crotty.

=== Regular season ===
With the addition of Marshall, Starks and Manning, the Jazz got off to a fast start by winning 16 of their first 20 games of the regular season. However, the team struggled a bit down the stretch losing 9 of their next 13 games, and held a 32–15 record at the All-Star break. The Jazz finished in second place in the Midwest Division with a 53–29 record, and earned the fourth seed in the Western Conference; the team qualified for the NBA playoffs for the 18th consecutive year. On a more positive note, the Jazz equaled the Los Angeles Lakers' record of sixteen consecutive winning seasons above .500 in winning percentage, set between 1976–77 and 1991–92; the Jazz were ultimately to make it nineteen consecutive winning seasons before finishing with only 26 wins in 2004–05.

Karl Malone averaged 23.2 points, 8.3 rebounds and 4.5 assists per game, and was named to the All-NBA Third Team. In addition, Marshall averaged 13.6 points and 7.0 rebounds per game, while Bryon Russell contributed 12.0 points per game, John Stockton provided the team with 11.5 points, 8.7 assists and 1.6 steals per game, and Starks contributed 9.3 points per game. Off the bench, Manning contributed 7.4 points per game, while Jacque Vaughn provided with 6.1 points and 3.9 assists per game, Greg Ostertag provided with 4.5 points, 5.1 rebounds and 1.8 blocks per game, and starting center Olden Polynice averaged 5.3 points and 4.7 rebounds per game.

During the NBA All-Star weekend at the MCI Center in Washington, D.C., Malone was selected for the 2001 NBA All-Star Game, as a member of the Western Conference All-Star team; it was his final All-Star appearance. Meanwhile, Russell participated in the NBA Three-Point Shootout, and also participated in the NBA 2Ball Competition, along with Natalie Williams of the WNBA's Utah Starzz, while rookie shooting guard, and first-round draft pick DeShawn Stevenson participated in the NBA Slam Dunk Contest. Malone also finished in seventh place in Most Valuable Player voting.

The Jazz finished seventh in the NBA in home-game attendance, with an attendance of 792,196 at the Delta Center during the regular season.

=== NBA playoffs ===
In the Western Conference First Round of the 2001 NBA playoffs, the Jazz faced off against the 5th–seeded Dallas Mavericks, who were led by the quartet of All-Star guard Michael Finley, Dirk Nowitzki, Juwan Howard and Steve Nash. The Jazz won the first two games over the Mavericks at home, which included a Game 2 win at the Delta Center, 109–98 to take a 2–0 series lead. However, the team lost the next two games on the road, including a Game 4 loss to the Mavericks at the Reunion Arena, 107–77. With the series tied at 2–2, the Jazz lost Game 5 to the Mavericks at the Delta Center, 84–83, thus losing in a hard-fought five-game series; it was the first time that the Jazz lost in the opening round of the NBA playoffs since the 1994–95 season.

=== Aftermath ===
Following the season, Manning signed as a free agent with the Dallas Mavericks, while Vaughn signed with the Atlanta Hawks, and Benoit and Polynice were both released to free agency.

== Draft picks ==
Round	Pick	Player	Position	Nationality	College
1	23	DeShawn Stevenson	SG	United States	
2	50	Kaniel Dickens	PF	United States	Idaho

== Roster ==
2000–01 Utah Jazz roster
Players

Pos.	No.	Player	Height	Weight	DOB	From
F	21	David Benoit	6 ft 8 in (2.03 m)	220 lb (100 kg)	1968–05–09	Alabama
G	22	John Crotty	6 ft 1 in (1.85 m)	185 lb (84 kg)	1969–07–15	Virginia
G/F	20	Quincy Lewis (injured)	6 ft 7 in (2.01 m)	215 lb (98 kg)	1977–06–26	Minnesota
F	32	Karl Malone	6 ft 9 in (2.06 m)	256 lb (116 kg)	1963–07–24	Louisiana Tech
F	15	Danny Manning	6 ft 10 in (2.08 m)	230 lb (104 kg)	1966–05–17	Kansas
F	42	Donyell Marshall	6 ft 9 in (2.06 m)	218 lb (99 kg)	1973–05–18	Connecticut
C	39	Greg Ostertag	7 ft 2 in (2.18 m)	280 lb (127 kg)	1973–03–06	Kansas
F	34	Scott Padgett (injured)	6 ft 9 in (2.06 m)	240 lb (109 kg)	1976–04–19	Kentucky
C	0	Olden Polynice	6 ft 11 in (2.11 m)	220 lb (100 kg)	1964–11–21	Virginia
F	3	Bryon Russell	6 ft 7 in (2.01 m)	225 lb (102 kg)	1970–12–31	Long Beach State
G	9	John Starks	6 ft 3 in (1.91 m)	180 lb (82 kg)	1965–08–10	Oklahoma State
G/F	2	DeShawn Stevenson	6 ft 5 in (1.96 m)	218 lb (99 kg)	1981–04–03	Washington Union HS (CA)
G	12	John Stockton	6 ft 1 in (1.85 m)	175 lb (79 kg)	1962–03–26	Gonzaga
G	11	Jacque Vaughn	6 ft 1 in (1.85 m)	190 lb (86 kg)	1975–02–11	Kansas

Coaches
Head coach
- Jerry Sloan
Assistant(s)
- Gordon Chiesa
- David Fredman
- Phil Johnson
- Kenny Natt
- Mark McKown (player development)

Legend
- (DP) Unsigned draft pick
- (FA) Free agent
- (S) Suspended
- Injured

Roster

== Regular season ==
=== Season standings ===
Midwest Division	W	L	PCT	GB	Home	Road	Div
z-San Antonio Spurs	58	24	.707	–	33–8	25–16	19–5
x-Utah Jazz	53	29	.646	5	28–13	25–16	14–10
x-Dallas Mavericks	53	29	.646	5	28–13	25–16	14–10
x-Minnesota Timberwolves	47	35	.573	11	30–11	17–24	11–13
e-Houston Rockets	45	37	.549	13	24–17	21–20	11–13
e-Denver Nuggets	40	42	.488	18	29–12	11–30	13–11
e-Vancouver Grizzlies	23	59	.280	35	15–26	8–33	2–22

Western Conference
#	Team	W	L	PCT	GB
1	z-San Antonio Spurs	58	24	.707	–
2	y-Los Angeles Lakers	56	26	.683	2
3	x-Sacramento Kings	55	27	.671	3
4	x-Utah Jazz	53	29	.646	5
5	x-Dallas Mavericks	53	29	.646	5
6	x-Phoenix Suns	51	31	.622	7
7	x-Portland Trail Blazers	50	32	.610	8
8	x-Minnesota Timberwolves	47	35	.573	11
9	e-Houston Rockets	45	37	.549	13
10	e-Seattle SuperSonics	44	38	.537	14
11	e-Denver Nuggets	40	42	.488	18
12	e-Los Angeles Clippers	31	51	.378	27
13	e-Vancouver Grizzlies	23	59	.280	35
14	e-Golden State Warriors	17	65	.207	41

== Game log ==
=== Regular season ===
2000–01 game log
Total: 53–29 (home: 28–13; road: 25–16)
November: 1–0 (home: 1–0; road: 0–0)

Game	Date	Team	Score	High points	High rebounds	High assists	Location Attendance	Record

November: 11–3 (home: 5–2; road: 6–1)

Game	Date	Team	Score	High points	High rebounds	High assists	Location Attendance	Record

December: 8–8 (home: 3–4; road: 5–4)

Game	Date	Team	Score	High points	High rebounds	High assists	Location Attendance	Record

January: 9–4 (home: 6–2; road: 3–2)

Game	Date	Team	Score	High points	High rebounds	High assists	Location Attendance	Record

February: 10–2 (home: 6–1; road: 4–1)

Game	Date	Team	Score	High points	High rebounds	High assists	Location Attendance	Record
All-Star Break

March: 9–7 (home: 5–2; road: 4–5)

Game	Date	Team	Score	High points	High rebounds	High assists	Location Attendance	Record

April: 5–5 (home: 2–2; road: 3–3)

Game	Date	Team	Score	High points	High rebounds	High assists	Location Attendance	Record

2000–01 schedule

== Playoffs ==
2001 playoff game log
First round: 2–3 (home: 2–1; road: 0–2)

Game	Date	Team	Score	High points	High rebounds	High assists	Location Attendance	Series
1	April 21	Dallas	W 88–86	Karl Malone (26)	Bryon Russell (12)	John Stockton (18)	Delta Center; 19,100	1–0
2	April 24	Dallas	W 109–98	Karl Malone (34)	Bryon Russell (8)	John Stockton (9)	Delta Center; 19,911	2–0
3	April 28	@ Dallas	L 91–94	Karl Malone (29)	Karl Malone (13)	John Stockton (10)	Reunion Arena; 18,187	2–1
4	May 1	@ Dallas	L 77–107	Karl Malone (25)	Donyell Marshall (9)	John Stockton (9)	Reunion Arena; 18,300	2–2
5	May 3	Dallas	L 83–84	Karl Malone (24)	Karl Malone (10)	John Stockton (11)	Delta Center; 19,911	2–3

2001 schedule

== Player statistics ==
Legend
GP	Games played	GS	Games started	MPG	Minutes per game
FG%	Field-goal percentage	3P%	3-point field-goal percentage	FT%	Free-throw percentage
RPG	Rebounds per game	APG	Assists per game	SPG	Steals per game
BPG	Blocks per game	PPG	Points per game

=== Season ===
Player	GP	GS	MPG	FG%	3FG%	FT%	RPG	APG	SPG	BPG	PPG
David Benoit	49	2	9.1	.483	.385	.795	1.7	.4	.1	.1	3.6
John Crotty	31	0	8.5	.338	.571	.895	.9	1.1	.2	.0	2.1
Quincy Lewis	35	2	11.5	.407	.360	.714	1.3	.5	.3	.3	3.5
Karl Malone	81	81	35.7	.498	.400	.793	8.3	4.5	1.1	.8	23.2
Danny Manning	82	0	15.9	.494	.250	.729	2.6	1.1	.6	.4	7.4
Donyell Marshall	81	49	28.7	.503	.320	.751	7.0	1.6	1.0	1.0	13.6
Greg Ostertag	81	3	18.4	.495	.500	.556	5.1	.3	.3	1.8	4.5
Scott Padgett	27	0	4.7	.419	.556	.750	1.4	.2	.2	.1	2.1
Olden Polynice	81	79	20.0	.496	.000	.262	4.7	.4	.3	1.0	5.3
Bryon Russell	78	46	31.7	.440	.413	.779	4.2	2.1	1.2	.3	12.0
John Starks	75	64	28.3	.398	.352	.802	2.1	2.4	1.0	.1	9.3
DeShawn Stevenson	40	2	7.3	.341	.083	.684	.7	.5	.3	.1	2.2
John Stockton	82	82	29.2	.504	.462	.817	2.8	8.7	1.6	.3	11.5
Jacque Vaughn	82	0	19.8	.433	.385	.780	1.8	3.9	.6	.0	6.1

=== Playoffs ===
Player	GP	GS	MPG	FG%	3FG%	FT%	RPG	APG	SPG	BPG	PPG
David Benoit	4	0	15.3	.368	.333	1.000	1.8	.5	.0	.5	5.8
John Crotty	4	0	4.8	.000		1.000	.8	.8	.3	.3	.8
Karl Malone	5	5	39.8	.405	.500	.796	8.8	3.4	1.0	.8	27.6
Danny Manning	5	0	19.2	.559	1.000	.750	2.2	.6	.6	.8	9.8
Donyell Marshall	5	5	32.0	.407	.125	.778	7.6	1.6	.4	1.0	10.4
Greg Ostertag	5	0	12.8	.364		.000	3.6	.2	.0	.4	1.6
Olden Polynice	5	5	20.0	.533	.000	.700	3.8	.2	.2	.4	7.8
Bryon Russell	5	5	42.8	.446	.455	.917	7.2	3.0	.6	.2	14.2
John Starks	3	0	12.0	.333	.250	1.000	1.0	.3	.3	.3	3.7
DeShawn Stevenson	1	0	8.0	.500			1.0	.0	.0	.0	2.0
John Stockton	5	5	37.2	.459	.000	.714	5.6	11.4	2.0	.6	9.8
Jacque Vaughn	5	0	11.4	.100	.500		.4	1.6	.0	.2	.6

Player statistics citation:

== Awards and records ==
- Karl Malone, All-NBA Third Team
