= 2000–01 Houston Rockets season =

- Head coach: Rudy Tomjanovich
- General manager: Carroll Dawson
- Owner: Leslie Alexander
- Arena: Compaq Center

Results
- Record: 45–37 (.549)
- Place: Division: 5th (Midwest); Conference: 9th (Western)
- Playoff finish: Did not qualify
- Stats at Basketball Reference

Local media
- Television: KTBU; Fox Sports Net Southwest
- Radio: KTRH

The 2000–01 Houston Rockets season was the 34th season for the Houston Rockets in the National Basketball Association, and their 30th season in Houston, Texas.

== Season summary ==
=== Off-season ===
The Rockets received the ninth overall pick in the 2000 NBA draft, and selected center Joel Przybilla from the University of Minnesota; however, the team soon traded Przybilla to the Milwaukee Bucks in exchange for rookie center, and first-round draft pick Jason Collier out of Georgia Tech University on draft day. In an effort to shore up their front line, the Rockets signed free agent Maurice Taylor during the off-season.

=== Regular season ===
With the addition of Taylor, and after the retirement of All-Star forward Charles Barkley, the Rockets got off to a 13–9 start to the regular season, but then went on a six-game losing streak afterwards. The team held a 25–25 record at the All-Star break, and then played above .500 basketball for the remainder of the season. However, the Rockets failed to qualify for the NBA playoffs despite finishing in fifth place in the Midwest Division with a winning record of 45–37, which was two games behind the 8th–seeded Minnesota Timberwolves.

Second-year star Steve Francis averaged 19.9 points, 6.9 rebounds, 6.5 assists and 1.8 steals per game, and led the Rockets with 133 three-point field goals, while Cuttino Mobley averaged 19.5 points and 5.0 rebounds per game, and Taylor provided the team with 13.0 points and 5.5 rebounds per game. In addition, Hakeem Olajuwon contributed 11.9 points, 7.4 rebounds and 1.5 blocks per game, but only played 58 games due to a blood condition in his left leg, while Shandon Anderson provided with 8.7 points per game, Walt Williams contributed 8.3 points per game, and second-year forward Kenny Thomas averaged 7.1 points and 5.6 rebounds per game.

During the NBA All-Star weekend at the MCI Center in Washington, D.C., Francis was selected for the NBA Rookie Challenge Game, as a member of the Sophomores team, while Mobley participated in the NBA 2Ball Competition, along with Sheryl Swoopes of the WNBA's Houston Comets. The Rockets finished last in the NBA in home-game attendance, with an attendance of 518,555 at the Compaq Center during the regular season, which was 29th in the league.

=== Aftermath ===
This season also marked an end of an era as Olajuwon was traded to the Toronto Raptors following the season, after seventeen seasons with the Rockets. Meanwhile, Anderson was traded to the New York Knicks, while Carlos Rogers signed as a free agent with the Indiana Pacers, and three-point specialist Matt Bullard signed with the Charlotte Hornets.

== Draft picks ==
Round	Pick	Player	Position	Nationality	College
1	9	Joel Przybilla	C	United States	Minnesota
2	38	Eduardo Nájera	PF/SF	Mexico	Oklahoma

== Roster ==
2000-01 Houston Rockets roster
Players

Pos.	No.	Player	Height	Weight	DOB	From
G/F	40	Shandon Anderson	6 ft 6 in (1.98 m)	208 lb (94 kg)	1973–12–31	Georgia
F	50	Matt Bullard	6 ft 10 in (2.08 m)	215 lb (98 kg)	1967–06–05	Iowa
F/C	13	Kelvin Cato	6 ft 11 in (2.11 m)	255 lb (116 kg)	1974–08–26	Iowa State
C	52	Jason Collier (injured)	7 ft 0 in (2.13 m)	260 lb (118 kg)	1977–09–08	Georgia Tech
G	20	Sean Colson	6 ft 0 in (1.83 m)	175 lb (79 kg)	1975–07–01	Charlotte
G	3	Steve Francis	6 ft 3 in (1.91 m)	195 lb (88 kg)	1977–02–21	Maryland
F	14	Dan Langhi	6 ft 11 in (2.11 m)	220 lb (100 kg)	1977–11–28	Vanderbilt
G/F	5	Cuttino Mobley	6 ft 4 in (1.93 m)	190 lb (86 kg)	1975–09–01	Rhode Island
G	12	Moochie Norris	6 ft 1 in (1.85 m)	175 lb (79 kg)	1973–07–27	West Florida
C	34	Hakeem Olajuwon	7 ft 0 in (2.13 m)	255 lb (116 kg)	1963–01–21	Houston
F/C	6	Carlos Rogers	6 ft 11 in (2.11 m)	220 lb (100 kg)	1971–02–06	Tennessee State
F/C	2	Maurice Taylor (injured)	6 ft 9 in (2.06 m)	260 lb (118 kg)	1976–10–30	Michigan
F	21	Kenny Thomas	6 ft 7 in (2.01 m)	261 lb (118 kg)	1977–07–25	New Mexico
F	42	Walt Williams	6 ft 8 in (2.03 m)	219 lb (99 kg)	1970–04–16	Maryland

Coaches
Head coach
- Rudy Tomjanovich
Assistant(s)
- Jim Boylen
- Larry Smith
- Mike Wells

Legend
- (DP) Unsigned draft pick
- (FA) Free agent
- (S) Suspended
- Injured

Roster

== Regular season ==
=== Season standings ===
Midwest Division	W	L	PCT	GB	Home	Road	Div
z-San Antonio Spurs	58	24	.707	–	33–8	25–16	19–5
x-Utah Jazz	53	29	.646	5	28–13	25–16	14–10
x-Dallas Mavericks	53	29	.646	5	28–13	25–16	14–10
x-Minnesota Timberwolves	47	35	.573	11	30–11	17–24	11–13
e-Houston Rockets	45	37	.549	13	24–17	21–20	11–13
e-Denver Nuggets	40	42	.488	18	29–12	11–30	13–11
e-Vancouver Grizzlies	23	59	.280	35	15–26	8–33	2–22

Western Conference
#	Team	W	L	PCT	GB
1	z-San Antonio Spurs	58	24	.707	–
2	y-Los Angeles Lakers	56	26	.683	2
3	x-Sacramento Kings	55	27	.671	3
4	x-Utah Jazz	53	29	.646	5
5	x-Dallas Mavericks	53	29	.646	5
6	x-Phoenix Suns	51	31	.622	7
7	x-Portland Trail Blazers	50	32	.610	8
8	x-Minnesota Timberwolves	47	35	.573	11
9	e-Houston Rockets	45	37	.549	13
10	e-Seattle SuperSonics	44	38	.537	14
11	e-Denver Nuggets	40	42	.488	18
12	e-Los Angeles Clippers	31	51	.378	27
13	e-Vancouver Grizzlies	23	59	.280	35
14	e-Golden State Warriors	17	65	.207	41

z – clinched division title
y – clinched division title
x – clinched playoff spot

== Game log ==
=== Regular season ===
2000–01 game log
Total: 45–37 (Home: 24–17; Road: 21–20)
October: 0–1 (home: 0–1; road: 0–0)

Game	Date	Team	Score	High points	High rebounds	High assists	Location Attendance	Record

November: 9–6 (home: 6–1; road: 3–5)

Game	Date	Team	Score	High points	High rebounds	High assists	Location Attendance	Record
2	November 2	Milwaukee	W 115–93				Compaq Center	1–1
5	November 7	L.A. Lakers	W 84–74				Compaq Center	2–3
8	November 12	@ L.A. Lakers	L 99–105				Staples Center	3–5
10	November 16	Charlotte	W 84–80				Compaq Center	5–5
15	November 28	Sacramento	L 81–88				Compaq Center	8–7

December: 5–8 (home: 1–6; road: 4–2)

Game	Date	Team	Score	High points	High rebounds	High assists	Location Attendance	Record
18	December 5	Dallas	W 109–102				Compaq Center	10–8
19	December 8	@ Sacramento	L 98–111				ARCO Arena	10–9
24	December 19	San Antonio	L 79–86				Compaq Center	13–11
25	December 21	L.A. Lakers	L 94–99				Compaq Center	13–12
27	December 26	@ San Antonio	L 95–103				Alamodome	13–14
29	December 30	@ Dallas	W 114–99				Reunion Arena	14–15

January: 8–8 (home: 3–4; road: 5–4)

Game	Date	Team	Score	High points	High rebounds	High assists	Location Attendance	Record
34	January 9	@ Toronto	W 110–91				Air Canada Centre	17–17
36	January 13	Sacramento	L 81–88				Compaq Center	18–18
38	January 16	Toronto	W 114–99				Compaq Center	19–19
40	January 19	@ L.A. Lakers	L 101–114				Staples Center	20–20
42	January 24	Philadelphia	L 84–85 (OT)				Compaq Center	20–22
44	January 27	@ Charlotte	W 110–97				Charlotte Coliseum	22–22

February: 9–4 (home: 5–2; road: 4–2)

Game	Date	Team	Score	High points	High rebounds	High assists	Location Attendance	Record
47	February 3	@ San Antonio	L 88–90				Alamodome	22–25
49	February 7	@ Philadelphia	W 112–87				First Union Center	24–25

March: 9–6 (home: 6–1; road: 3–5)

Game	Date	Team	Score	High points	High rebounds	High assists	Location Attendance	Record
59	March 1	@ Milwaukee	W 108–91				Bradley Center	32–27
60	March 3	@ Dallas	L 95–100				Reunion Arena	32–28
67	March 17	San Antonio	W 103–99				Compaq Center	38–29
68	March 20	@ Sacramento	L 109–125				ARCO Arena	38–30

April: 5–4 (home: 3–2; road: 2–2)

Game	Date	Team	Score	High points	High rebounds	High assists	Location Attendance	Record
75	April 3	Dallas	L 97–109				Compaq Center	40–35

2000–01 schedule

== Player statistics ==
Legend
GP	Games played	GS	Games started	MPG	Minutes per game
FG%	Field-goal percentage	3P%	3-point field-goal percentage	FT%	Free-throw percentage
RPG	Rebounds per game	APG	Assists per game	SPG	Steals per game
BPG	Blocks per game	PPG	Points per game

=== Season ===
Player	GP	GS	MPG	FG%	3FG%	FT%	RPG	APG	SPG	BPG	PPG
Shandon Anderson	82	82	29.2	.446	.271	.734	4.1	2.3	1.0	.5	8.7
Matt Bullard	61	5	16.4	.423	.404	.714	2.1	.7	.2	.1	5.8
Kelvin Cato	35	13	17.8	.577		.649	4.0	.3	.4	.9	4.7
Jason Collier	23	0	9.7	.380	.000	.708	1.6	.3	.1	.1	3.1
Sean Colson^{†}	10	0	3.0	.316	.250	.500	.3	.7	.1	.0	1.5
Steve Francis	80	79	39.9	.451	.396	.817	6.9	6.5	1.8	.4	19.9
Dan Langhi	33	0	7.3	.374	.000	.552	1.2	.1	.2	.0	2.7
Anthony Miller^{†}	1	0	3.0				.0	.0	.0	.0	.0
Cuttino Mobley	79	49	38.0	.434	.357	.831	5.0	2.5	1.1	.3	19.5
Moochie Norris	82	6	20.2	.446	.281	.778	2.4	3.5	.8	.0	6.6
Hakeem Olajuwon	58	55	26.6	.498	.000	.621	7.4	1.2	1.2	1.5	11.9
Carlos Rogers	39	0	13.9	.682	.000	.558	3.6	.2	.3	.5	4.6
Maurice Taylor	69	69	28.6	.489	.000	.735	5.5	1.5	.4	.6	13.0
Kenny Thomas	74	21	24.6	.443	.272	.722	5.6	1.0	.5	.6	7.1
Walt Williams	72	31	22.0	.394	.395	.770	3.4	1.3	.4	.4	8.3

Player statistics citation:

== See also ==
- 2000–01 NBA season
