= 2000–01 Portland Trail Blazers season =

American professional basketball season

- Head coach: Mike Dunleavy
- General manager: Bob Whitsitt
- Owner: Paul Allen
- Arena: Rose Garden Arena

Results
- Record: 50–32 (.610)
- Place: Division: 4th (Pacific); Conference: 7th (Western)
- Playoff finish: First round (lost to Lakers 0–3)
- Stats at Basketball Reference

Local media
- Television: KGW; Fox Sports Net Northwest
- Radio: KEX

The 2000–01 Portland Trail Blazers season was the 31st season for the Portland Trail Blazers in the National Basketball Association.

== Season summary ==
=== Off-season ===
During the off-season, the Trail Blazers acquired Dale Davis from the Indiana Pacers, and acquired All-Star forward Shawn Kemp from the Cleveland Cavaliers in a three-team trade.

=== Regular season ===
With the addition of Davis, the Trail Blazers struggled losing three of their first four games of the regular season, but soon recovered and later on posted a 10-game winning streak between January and February, and held a 35–15 record at the All-Star break. At mid-season, the team re-signed free agent and former Trail Blazers guard Rod Strickland, who the Washington Wizards previously released. Despite the strong start, the Trail Blazers struggled and played below .500 in winning percentage for the remainder of the season, posting a 15–17 record after the All-Star break. Falling nine games below the previous season's mark, the Trail Blazers finished in fourth place in the Pacific Division with a solid 50–32 record, and earning the seventh seed in the Western Conference; the team qualified for the NBA playoffs for the 19th consecutive year, and also for the 24th time in 25 years.

Rasheed Wallace averaged 19.2 points, 7.8 rebounds and 1.8 blocks per game, while Steve Smith provided the team with 13.6 points per game, and Bonzi Wells continued to show improvement, averaging 12.7 points and 1.3 steals per game. In addition, Damon Stoudamire averaged 13.0 points, 5.7 assists and 1.3 steals per game, while Scottie Pippen provided with 11.3 points, 4.6 assists and 1.5 steals per game, and Arvydas Sabonis contributed 10.1 points and 5.4 rebounds per game. Meanwhile, Davis averaged 7.2 points and 7.5 rebounds per game, Kemp provided with 6.5 points and 3.8 rebounds per game, Greg Anthony contributed 4.9 points per game, and Stacey Augmon contributed 4.7 points per game.

During the NBA All-Star weekend at the MCI Center in Washington, D.C., Wallace was selected for the 2001 NBA All-Star Game, as a member of the Western Conference All-Star team. Smith finished tied in sixth place in Sixth Man of the Year voting, while Wells finished tied in ninth place in Most Improved Player voting. The Trail Blazers finished third in the NBA in home-game attendance, with an attendance of 831,376 at the Rose Garden Arena during the regular season.

=== NBA playoffs ===
In the Western Conference First Round of the 2001 NBA playoffs, and for the second consecutive year, the Trail Blazers faced off against the 2nd–seeded, and defending NBA champion Los Angeles Lakers, who won the Pacific Division title, and were led by All-Star center Shaquille O'Neal, All-Star guard Kobe Bryant, and Derek Fisher. However, the Trail Blazers were without Wells, who was out due to a season-ending knee injury sustained during the final month of the regular season. Without Wells, the Trail Blazers lost the first two games to the Lakers on the road at the Staples Center, before losing Game 3 at home, 99–86 at the Rose Garden Arena, thus losing the series in a three-game sweep.

The Lakers would advance to the NBA Finals for the second consecutive year, and defeat the Philadelphia 76ers in five games in the 2001 NBA Finals, winning their second consecutive NBA championship.

=== Aftermath ===
Following the season, head coach Mike Dunleavy was fired after four seasons with the Trail Blazers, while Smith was traded to the San Antonio Spurs, and Strickland signed as a free agent with the Miami Heat. Meanwhile, Anthony was traded to the Chicago Bulls, Augmon signed with the Charlotte Hornets, and Sabonis and Detlef Schrempf both retired; however, Sabonis would return for the 2002–03 season.

== Draft picks ==
Round	Pick	Player	Position	Nationality	School/Club team
1	28	Erick Barkley	PG	United States	St. John's

== Roster ==
2000–01 Portland Trail Blazers roster
Players

Pos.	No.	Player	Height	Weight	DOB	From
G	50	Greg Anthony	6 ft 0 in (1.83 m)	176 lb (80 kg)	1967–11–15	UNLV
G/F	2	Stacey Augmon	6 ft 8 in (2.03 m)	205 lb (93 kg)	1968–08–01	UNLV
G	21	Erick Barkley (injured)	6 ft 1 in (1.85 m)	177 lb (80 kg)	1978–02–21	St. John's
F/C	34	Dale Davis	6 ft 11 in (2.11 m)	230 lb (104 kg)	1969–03–25	Clemson
F	4	Antonio Harvey	6 ft 11 in (2.11 m)	225 lb (102 kg)	1970–07–06	Pfeiffer
F/C	40	Shawn Kemp (injured)	6 ft 10 in (2.08 m)	230 lb (104 kg)	1969–11–26	Trinity Valley CC
C	55	Will Perdue (injured)	7 ft 0 in (2.13 m)	240 lb (109 kg)	1965–08–29	Vanderbilt
F	33	Scottie Pippen	6 ft 8 in (2.03 m)	210 lb (95 kg)	1965–09–25	Central Arkansas
C	11	Arvydas Sabonis	7 ft 3 in (2.21 m)	279 lb (127 kg)	1964–12–19	Lithuania
F	12	Detlef Schrempf	6 ft 9 in (2.06 m)	214 lb (97 kg)	1963–01–21	Washington
G	8	Steve Smith	6 ft 7 in (2.01 m)	200 lb (91 kg)	1969–03–31	Michigan State
G	3	Damon Stoudamire	5 ft 10 in (1.78 m)	171 lb (78 kg)	1973–09–03	Arizona
G	1	Rod Strickland	6 ft 3 in (1.91 m)	175 lb (79 kg)	1966–07–11	DePaul
F/C	30	Rasheed Wallace	6 ft 10 in (2.08 m)	225 lb (102 kg)	1974–09–17	North Carolina
G/F	6	Bonzi Wells (injured)	6 ft 5 in (1.96 m)	210 lb (95 kg)	1976–09–28	Ball State

Coaches
Head coach
- Mike Dunleavy
Assistant(s)
- Tony Brown
- Jim Eyen
- Tim Grgurich
- Elston Turner

Legend
- (DP) Unsigned draft pick
- (FA) Free agent
- (S) Suspended
- Injured

Roster

== Regular season ==
=== Season standings ===
Pacific Division	W	L	PCT	GB	Home	Road	Div
y-Los Angeles Lakers	56	26	.683	–	31–10	25–16	14–10
x-Sacramento Kings	55	27	.671	1	33–8	22–19	16–8
x-Phoenix Suns	51	31	.622	5	31–10	20–21	12–12
x-Portland Trail Blazers	50	32	.610	6	28–13	22–19	12–12
e-Seattle SuperSonics	44	38	.537	12	26–15	18–23	17–7
e-Los Angeles Clippers	31	51	378	25	22–19	9–32	9–15
e-Golden State Warriors	17	65	.207	39	11–30	6–35	4–20

Western Conference
#	Team	W	L	PCT	GB
1	z-San Antonio Spurs	58	24	.707	–
2	y-Los Angeles Lakers	56	26	.683	2
3	x-Sacramento Kings	55	27	.671	3
4	x-Utah Jazz	53	29	.646	5
5	x-Dallas Mavericks	53	29	.646	5
6	x-Phoenix Suns	51	31	.622	7
7	x-Portland Trail Blazers	50	32	.610	8
8	x-Minnesota Timberwolves	47	35	.573	11
9	e-Houston Rockets	45	37	.549	13
10	e-Seattle SuperSonics	44	38	.537	14
11	e-Denver Nuggets	40	42	.488	18
12	e-Los Angeles Clippers	31	51	.378	27
13	e-Vancouver Grizzlies	23	59	.280	35
14	e-Golden State Warriors	17	65	.207	41

z - clinched division title
y - clinched division title
x - clinched playoff spot

== Playoffs ==
2001 playoff game log
First Round: 0–3 (home: 0–1; road: 0–2)

Game	Date	Team	Score	High points	High rebounds	High assists	Location Attendance	Series
1	April 22	@ L.A. Lakers	L 93–106	Rasheed Wallace (24)	Arvydas Sabonis (9)	three players tied (4)	Staples Center; 18,997	0–1
2	April 26	@ L.A. Lakers	L 88–106	Scottie Pippen (21)	Scottie Pippen (8)	Damon Stoudamire (5)	Staples Center; 18,997	0–2
3	April 29	L.A. Lakers	L 86–99	Smith, Stoudamire (25)	Rasheed Wallace (13)	Stoudamire, Wallace (4)	Rose Garden; 20,580	0–3

2001 schedule

== Player statistics ==
Legend
GP	Games played	GS	Games started	MPG	Minutes per game
FG%	Field-goal percentage	3P%	3-point field-goal percentage	FT%	Free-throw percentage
RPG	Rebounds per game	APG	Assists per game	SPG	Steals per game
BPG	Blocks per game	PPG	Points per game

=== Regular season ===
Player	GP	GS	MPG	FG%	3P%	FT%	RPG	APG	SPG	BPG	PPG
Damon Stoudamire	82	82	32.4	.434	.374	.831	3.7	5.7	1.3	.1	13.0
Dale Davis	81	43	26.7	.497	.000	.632	7.5	1.3	.5	.9	7.2
Steve Smith	81	36	31.4	.456	.339	.890	3.4	2.6	.6	.3	13.6
Rasheed Wallace	77	75	38.2	.501	.321	.766	7.8	2.8	1.2	1.8	19.2
Bonzi Wells	75	46	26.6	.533	.340	.663	4.9	2.8	1.3	.3	12.7
Shawn Kemp	68	3	15.9	.407	.364	.771	3.8	1.0	.7	.3	6.5
Stacey Augmon	66	23	17.9	.477	.000	.655	2.4	1.5	.7	.3	4.7
Scottie Pippen	64	60	33.3	.451	.344	.739	5.2	4.6	1.5	.5	11.3
Arvydas Sabonis	61	42	21.3	.479	.067	.776	5.4	1.5	.7	1.0	10.1
Greg Anthony	58	0	14.8	.383	.409	.657	1.1	1.4	.7	.1	4.9
Detlef Schrempf	26	0	15.3	.411	.375	.852	3.0	1.7	.3	.1	4.0
Rod Strickland^{†}	21	0	16.7	.418	.000	.577	1.7	3.4	.5	.0	4.6
Will Perdue	13	0	4.5	.667		.500	1.4	.2	.2	.2	1.1
Antonio Harvey	12	0	6.0	.464		.833	1.2	.3	.1	.5	2.6
Erick Barkley	8	0	4.8	.364	.375		.4	.8	.3	.0	2.4
Gary Grant	4	0	4.3	.714			.0	.3	.0	.0	2.5

=== Playoffs ===
Player	GP	GS	MPG	FG%	3P%	FT%	RPG	APG	SPG	BPG	PPG
Rasheed Wallace	3	3	42.7	.373	.364	.571	8.0	2.3	.3	1.0	16.7
Steve Smith	3	3	40.7	.471	.364	.938	4.3	2.3	.7	.3	17.0
Scottie Pippen	3	3	39.0	.421	.176	.667	5.7	2.3	2.7	.7	13.7
Damon Stoudamire	3	3	38.0	.413	.154	1.000	3.0	4.3	.7	.3	17.7
Arvydas Sabonis	3	3	34.7	.483	.000	.750	8.3	2.7	.3	2.3	11.3
Detlef Schrempf	3	0	10.7	.667	.667	.667	1.7	.3	.0	.0	4.7
Will Perdue	3	0	1.7			.000	.7	.0	.0	.0	.0
Stacey Augmon	2	0	14.0	.400		1.000	2.0	2.0	.5	.0	5.0
Dale Davis	2	0	10.0	.000	.000	.500	2.0	.0	.5	.0	.5
Rod Strickland	2	0	9.5	.333		.667	2.0	1.0	1.0	.0	4.0
Greg Anthony	2	0	8.5	.333	.333		.0	.0	.5	.0	2.5
Antonio Harvey	2	0	7.0	.000			3.0	.0	.0	.0	.0

- ^{†} Denotes player spent time with another team in the season. Stats reflect time with the Trail Blazers only.

Player statistics citation:

== Awards and honors ==
- Rasheed Wallace, NBA All-Star

== Transactions ==
- July 21, 2000: Signed free agent Rodrick Rhodes
- August 13, 2000: Re-signed Greg Anthony
- August 30, 2000: Traded forward Brian Grant to the Miami Heat and guard Gary Grant to the Cleveland Cavaliers in exchange for Shawn Kemp (from the Cavaliers).
- August 31, 2000: Traded forward Jermaine O'Neal and center Joe Kleine to the Indiana Pacers in exchange for Dale Davis
- September 13, 2000: Signed free agent center Will Perdue
- September 12, 2000: Re-signed guard-forward Stacey Augmon
- September 15, 2000: Signed draft pick Erick Barkley
- October 3, 2000: Forward Detlef Schrempf retired
- October 4, 2000: Signed free agent C.J. Bruton
- October 4, 2000: Signed free agent Todd Lindeman
- October 4, 2000: Signed free agent Ime Udoka
- October 26, 2000: Waived Jamel Thomas
- October 26, 2000: Waived C.J. Bruton
- October 26, 2000: Waived Todd Lindeman
- October 28, 2000: Waived Ime Udoka
- October 30, 2000: Waived Rodrick Rhodes
- November 30, 2000: Forward Bonzi Wells was suspended one game by the NBA for striking an official.
- February 2, 2001: Forward Rasheed Wallace was suspended two games by the NBA
- March 5, 2001: Waived guard Gary Grant
- March 5, 2001: Signed guard Rod Strickland
- April 3, 2001: Guard Rod Strickland was suspended one game by the NBA due to a DUI charge
- April 3, 2001: Forward Rasheed Wallace was suspended one game by the Trail Blazers
- April 29, 2001: Forward-center Dale Davis was suspended one game by the NBA for elbowing the Los Angeles Lakers' forward Robert Horry.
- April 29, 2001: Guard-forward Stacey Augmon was suspended one game by the NBA for leaving the bench during an altercation on the court.

Player Transactions Citation:
