= 2000–01 Minnesota Timberwolves season =

NBA professional basketball team season

- Head coach: Flip Saunders
- General manager: Kevin McHale
- Owners: Glen Taylor
- Arena: Target Center

Results
- Record: 47–35 (.573)
- Place: Division: 4th (Midwest); Conference: 8th (Western)
- Playoff finish: First round (lost to Spurs 1–3)
- Stats at Basketball Reference

The 2000–01 Minnesota Timberwolves season was the 12th season for the Minnesota Timberwolves in the National Basketball Association.

== Season summary ==
=== Off-season ===
After the tragic death of Malik Sealy, the Timberwolves scrambled to find a replacement for him, signing free agent Chauncey Billups, a close friend of Kevin Garnett, and signing LaPhonso Ellis during the off-season. Meanwhile, the Timberwolves were involved in controversy, as their secret free-agent deal signed by Joe Smith was voided by the NBA, who ruled their proper procedure in signing the contract, while stripping their first-round draft picks for the next five seasons and fined the team $3.5 million. Timberwolves owner Glen Taylor, and General Manager Kevin McHale were both suspended for one year. Smith would later on sign a free-agent deal with the Detroit Pistons.

=== Regular season ===
With the addition of Billups and Ellis, the Timberwolves lost four of their first six games of the regular season, but then won 13 of their next 18 games. The team posted an 11-game winning streak between January and February, and held a 32–18 record at the All-Star break. At mid-season, the team signed free agent Felipe López, who was previously released by the Washington Wizards. The Timberwolves finished in fourth place in the Midwest Division with a 47–35 record, and earned the eighth seed in the Western Conference; the team qualified for the NBA playoffs for the fifth consecutive year.

Garnett averaged 22.0 points, 11.4 rebounds, 5.0 assists, 1.4 steals and 1.8 blocks per game, and was named to the All-NBA Second Team, and to the NBA All-Defensive First Team. In addition, second-year star Wally Szczerbiak averaged 14.0 points and 5.5 rebounds per game, while Terrell Brandon provided the team with 16.0 points, 7.5 assists and 2.1 steals per game, and Anthony Peeler contributed 10.5 points per game, and led the Timberwolves with 100 three-point field goals. Meanwhile, Billups contributed 9.3 points and 3.4 assists per game, Ellis provided with 9.4 points and 6.0 rebounds per game off the bench, and Rasho Nesterovic averaged 4.5 points and 3.9 rebounds per game.

During the NBA All-Star weekend at the MCI Center in Washington, D.C., Garnett was selected for the 2001 NBA All-Star Game, as a member of the Western Conference All-Star team, while Szczerbiak was selected for the NBA Rookie Challenge Game, as a member of the Sophomores team. Szczerbiak scored 27 points along with 8 rebounds, 2 steals, and made 5 out of 6 three-point field-goal attempts, and was named the Rookie Challenge Game's Most Valuable Player, as the Sophomores defeated the Rookies team, 121–113. Garnett finished in fifth place in Most Valuable Player voting with 1 first-place vote, and also finished in second place in Defensive Player of the Year voting, behind Dikembe Mutombo of the Philadelphia 76ers, while Ellis finished in third place in Sixth Man of the Year voting.

The Timberwolves finished eleventh in the NBA in home-game attendance, with an attendance of 717,371 at the Target Center during the regular season.

=== NBA playoffs ===
In the Western Conference First Round of the 2001 NBA playoffs, the Timberwolves faced off against the top–seeded, and Midwest Division champion San Antonio Spurs, who were led by All-Star forward Tim Duncan, All-Star center David Robinson, and Derek Anderson. The Timberwolves lost the first two games to the Spurs on the road at the Alamodome, but managed to win Game 3 at home, 93–84 at the Target Center. However, the Timberwolves lost Game 4 to the Spurs at home, 97–84, thus losing the series in four games; it was the fifth consecutive year that the Timberwolves lost in the opening round of the NBA playoffs.

=== Aftermath ===
Following the season, Ellis signed as a free agent with the Miami Heat, and Tom Hammonds retired.

== Draft picks ==
Round	Pick	Player	Position	Nationality	College
2	51	Igor Rakocevic	PG/SG	Serbia	

== Roster ==
2000–01 Minnesota Timberwolves roster
Players

Pos.	No.	Player	Height	Weight	DOB	From
PG	5	William Avery	6 ft 2 in (1.88 m)	197 lb (89 kg)	1979–08–08	Duke
SG	4	Chauncey Billups	6 ft 3 in (1.91 m)	202 lb (92 kg)	1976–09–25	Colorado
PG	7	Terrell Brandon	5 ft 11 in (1.80 m)	180 lb (82 kg)	1970–05–20	Oregon
SG	11	Todd Day	6 ft 6 in (1.98 m)	188 lb (85 kg)	1970–01–07	Arkansas
PF	3	LaPhonso Ellis	6 ft 8 in (2.03 m)	240 lb (109 kg)	1970–05–05	Notre Dame
PF	21	Kevin Garnett	6 ft 11 in (2.11 m)	220 lb (100 kg)	1976–05–19	Farragut Academy (IL)
C	22	Dean Garrett	6 ft 10 in (2.08 m)	225 lb (102 kg)	1966–11–27	Indiana
PF	20	Tom Hammonds	6 ft 9 in (2.06 m)	215 lb (98 kg)	1967–03–27	Georgia Tech
PG	13	Felipe López	6 ft 5 in (1.96 m)	180 lb (82 kg)	1974–12–19	St. John's
SF	42	Sam Mitchell	6 ft 6 in (1.98 m)	210 lb (95 kg)	1963–09–02	Mercer
C	8	Rasho Nesterović	7 ft 0 in (2.13 m)	255 lb (116 kg)	1976–05–30	Slovenia
SG	44	Anthony Peeler	6 ft 4 in (1.93 m)	208 lb (94 kg)	1969–11–25	Missouri
PF	35	Reggie Slater	6 ft 7 in (2.01 m)	215 lb (98 kg)	1970–08–27	Wyoming
SF	10	Wally Szczerbiak	6 ft 7 in (2.01 m)	244 lb (111 kg)	1977–03–05	Miami (OH)

Coaches
Head coach
- Flip Saunders
Assistant(s)
- Greg Ballard
- Jerry Sichting
- Jimmy Williams
- Don Zierden
- Gregg Farnam (trainer)

Legend
- (DP) Unsigned draft pick
- (FA) Free agent
- (S) Suspended
- Injured

Roster
Updated: February 28, 2001

== Regular season ==
=== Season standings ===
Midwest Division	W	L	PCT	GB	Home	Road	Div
z-San Antonio Spurs	58	24	.707	–	33–8	25–16	19–5
x-Utah Jazz	53	29	.646	5	28–13	25–16	14–10
x-Dallas Mavericks	53	29	.646	5	28–13	25–16	14–10
x-Minnesota Timberwolves	47	35	.573	11	30–11	17–24	11–13
e-Houston Rockets	45	37	.549	13	24–17	21–20	11–13
e-Denver Nuggets	40	42	.488	18	29–12	11–30	13–11
e-Vancouver Grizzlies	23	59	.280	35	15–26	8–33	2–22

Western Conference
#	Team	W	L	PCT	GB
1	z-San Antonio Spurs	58	24	.707	–
2	y-Los Angeles Lakers	56	26	.683	2
3	x-Sacramento Kings	55	27	.671	3
4	x-Utah Jazz	53	29	.646	5
5	x-Dallas Mavericks	53	29	.646	5
6	x-Phoenix Suns	51	31	.622	7
7	x-Portland Trail Blazers	50	32	.610	8
8	x-Minnesota Timberwolves	47	35	.573	11
9	e-Houston Rockets	45	37	.549	13
10	e-Seattle SuperSonics	44	38	.537	14
11	e-Denver Nuggets	40	42	.488	18
12	e-Los Angeles Clippers	31	51	.378	27
13	e-Vancouver Grizzlies	23	59	.280	35
14	e-Golden State Warriors	17	65	.207	41

z - clinched division title
y - clinched division title
x - clinched playoff spot

== Playoffs ==
2001 playoff game log
First Round: 1–3 (home: 1–1; road: 0–2)

Game	Date	Team	Score	High points	High rebounds	High assists	Location Attendance	Series
1	April 21	@ San Antonio	L 82–87	Kevin Garnett (25)	Kevin Garnett (13)	Terrell Brandon (8)	Alamodome; 33,983	0–1
2	April 23	@ San Antonio	L 69–86	Kevin Garnett (18)	Kevin Garnett (12)	six players tied (2)	Alamodome; 31,759	0–2
3	April 28	San Antonio	W 93–84	Kevin Garnett (22)	Kevin Garnett (8)	Terrell Brandon (9)	Target Center; 17,676	1–2
4	April 30	San Antonio	L 84–97	Wally Szczerbiak (20)	Kevin Garnett (15)	Terrell Brandon (6)	Target Center; 16,336	1–3

2001 schedule

== Player statistics ==
=== Ragular season ===
Player	POS	GP	GS	MP	REB	AST	STL	BLK	PTS	MPG	RPG	APG	SPG	BPG	PPG
Wally Szczerbiak	SF	82	82	2,856	447	260	59	33	1,145	34.8	5.5	3.2	.7	.4	14.0
LaPhonso Ellis	PF	82	5	1,948	494	93	67	74	772	23.8	6.0	1.1	.8	.9	9.4
Sam Mitchell	SF	82	4	983	123	57	26	10	285	12.0	1.5	.7	.3	.1	3.5
Kevin Garnett	PF	81	81	3,202	921	401	111	145	1,784	39.5	11.4	5.0	1.4	1.8	22.0
Terrell Brandon	PG	78	78	2,821	298	583	161	21	1,250	36.2	3.8	7.5	2.1	.3	16.0
Chauncey Billups	SG	77	33	1,790	158	260	51	11	713	23.2	2.1	3.4	.7	.1	9.3
Anthony Peeler	SG	75	41	2,126	192	192	91	18	791	28.3	2.6	2.6	1.2	.2	10.5
Rasho Nesterović	C	73	39	1,233	286	45	25	63	328	16.9	3.9	.6	.3	.9	4.5
Dean Garrett	C	70	21	831	217	24	26	49	177	11.9	3.1	.3	.4	.7	2.5
Reggie Slater	PF	55	16	686	186	26	18	9	254	12.5	3.4	.5	.3	.2	4.6
William Avery	PG	55	0	463	29	75	13	4	154	8.4	.5	1.4	.2	.1	2.8
Todd Day	SG	31	0	345	37	28	10	7	132	11.1	1.2	.9	.3	.2	4.3
Felipe López^{†}	PG	23	10	457	74	34	21	12	170	19.9	3.2	1.5	.9	.5	7.4
Sam Jacobson	PG	14	0	59	6	4	3	0	20	4.2	.4	.3	.2	.0	1.4
Tom Hammonds	PF	7	0	30	4	1	0	0	7	4.3	.6	.1	.0	.0	1.0

- ^{†} Denotes player spent time with another team in the season. Stats reflect time with the Timberwolves only.

=== Playoffs ===
Player	POS	GP	GS	MP	REB	AST	STL	BLK	PTS	MPG	RPG	APG	SPG	BPG	PPG
Kevin Garnett	PF	4	4	165	48	17	4	6	84	41.3	12.0	4.3	1.0	1.5	21.0
Terrell Brandon	PG	4	4	153	17	25	4	2	61	38.3	4.3	6.3	1.0	.5	15.3
Wally Szczerbiak	SF	4	4	143	18	10	5	3	56	35.8	4.5	2.5	1.3	.8	14.0
Anthony Peeler	SG	4	4	137	14	7	7	1	34	34.3	3.5	1.8	1.8	.3	8.5
Rasho Nesterović	C	4	2	49	12	3	1	3	10	12.3	3.0	.8	.3	.8	2.5
LaPhonso Ellis	PF	4	0	77	14	0	1	3	24	19.3	3.5	.0	.3	.8	6.0
Felipe López	PG	4	0	55	11	5	4	0	17	13.8	2.8	1.3	1.0	.0	4.3
Reggie Slater	PF	4	0	52	14	0	2	3	13	13.0	3.5	.0	.5	.8	3.3
Sam Mitchell	SF	4	0	50	7	3	1	0	6	12.5	1.8	.8	.3	.0	1.5
Dean Garrett	C	3	2	41	9	0	1	1	13	13.7	3.0	.0	.3	.3	4.3
Chauncey Billups	SG	3	0	26	5	2	0	0	3	8.7	1.7	.7	.0	.0	1.0
William Avery	PG	2	0	12	1	2	0	1	7	6.0	.5	1.0	.0	.5	3.5

== Awards and records ==
- Kevin Garnett, All-NBA Second Team
- Kevin Garnett, NBA All-Defensive First Team

== See also ==
- 2000-01 NBA season
