= 2000–01 Vancouver Grizzlies season =

- Head coach: Sidney Lowe
- President: Dick Versace
- General manager: Billy Knight
- Owner: Michael Heisley
- Arena: General Motors Place

Results
- Record: 23–59 (.280)
- Place: Division: 7th (Midwest); Conference: 13th (Western)
- Playoff finish: Did not qualify

Local media
- Television: VTV; CTV Sportsnet Pacific
- Radio: CKST

The 2000–01 Vancouver Grizzlies season was the sixth season for the Vancouver Grizzlies in the National Basketball Association; it would also be the team's final season in Vancouver, British Columbia, Canada.

== Season summary ==
=== Off-season ===
The Grizzlies received the second overall pick in the 2000 NBA draft, and selected power forward Stromile Swift out of Louisiana State University. During the off-season, the team acquired Isaac Austin from the Washington Wizards, re-acquired former Grizzlies forward Tony Massenburg after one season with the Houston Rockets, and signed free agents Damon Jones and Mahmoud Abdul-Rauf. The Grizzlies also hired Sidney Lowe as their new head coach.

For the season, the Grizzlies redesigned their white home uniforms, which featured the team name "Grizzlies" in black letters on the front of their jerseys. The uniforms also featured a V-shaped collar, a turquoise, black and red trim, turquoise side panels with red outlines on their jerseys and the left leg of their shorts, and their alternate logo of a grizzly bear scratching a turquoise letter "G" on the right leg of their shorts. Meanwhile, the team's black alternate uniforms became their primary road uniforms for this season.

Both uniforms, mainly the team's new home uniforms, would only last for just one season.

=== Regular season ===
Entering their sixth season as an NBA franchise, the rumors of a move became a reality. Club owner Michael Heisley decided that it was time for the Grizzlies to move on; after five losing seasons had given the team low morale and decreasing support in the community, the team found itself in debt. Under Lowe and with the addition of Swift, the Grizzlies got off to a good start by winning four of their first five games of the regular season. However, the team posted a seven-game losing streak afterwards, losing 21 of their next 25 games, and holding a 13–36 record at the All-Star break.

On February 19, 2001, the Grizzlies were in last place in the Midwest Division with a 17–36 record, and Heisley traveled to Memphis, Tennessee to discuss a deal between the city and the team; other city candidates for the team's relocation included Louisville, Kentucky, Anaheim, California and New Orleans, Louisiana. The NBA would grant the team permission to move to Memphis, as the league determined that its time in Vancouver was a failure. At mid-season, the team traded Othella Harrington to the New York Knicks in exchange for Erick Strickland.

Despite a five-game winning streak in mid-February, the Grizzlies posted another seven-game losing streak, and then posted a nine-game losing streak in March, finishing in last place in the Midwest Division again with a 23–59 record; it was the team's best record in Vancouver, and the first time they avoided 60 losses in a full 82-game season, but still missed the NBA playoffs for the sixth consecutive year. The Grizzlies lost their final two games against the Toronto Raptors, finishing with a 4–7 record in regular season games against their Canadian rival.

Shareef Abdur-Rahim averaged 20.5 points and 9.1 rebounds per game, while Michael Dickerson finished second on the team in scoring averaging 16.3 points per game, and Mike Bibby provided the team with 15.9 points, 8.4 assists and 1.3 steals per game, and also led them with 108 three-point field goals. In addition, Bryant Reeves averaged 8.3 points and 6.0 rebounds per game, while Jones contributed 6.5 points and 3.2 assists per game, Strickland provided with 6.4 points and 3.0 assists per game in 22 games after the trade, and Grant Long averaged 6.0 points and 4.2 rebounds per game. Meanwhile, Abdul-Rauf contributed 6.5 points per game, Swift averaged 4.9 points, 3.6 rebounds and 1.0 blocks per game, Massenburg averaged 4.5 points and 4.0 rebounds per game, and Austin provided with 4.3 points and rebounds per game each.

During the NBA All-Star weekend at the MCI Center in Washington, D.C., Swift participated in the NBA Slam Dunk Contest. The Grizzlies' home-game attendance continued to decrease, as the team finished 26th in the NBA with an attendance of 563,218 at General Motors Place during the regular season, which was the fourth-lowest in the league.

On April 14, the Grizzlies played their final home game at General Motors Place in Vancouver, losing to the Houston Rockets by a score of 100–95; second-year star Steve Francis, who had been drafted by the Grizzlies, but refused to play for them, was booed by the Grizzlies fans throughout the game. In their final game on April 18 as the "Vancouver Grizzlies", the team played against the Golden State Warriors on the road at The Arena in Oakland; the Grizzlies defeated the Warriors by a score of 95–81 to avoid another 60-loss season, as Abdur-Rahim posted a double-double of 26 points and 22 rebounds.

=== Aftermath ===
The franchise moved to Memphis, and became known as the Memphis Grizzlies the following season. On draft day, Abdur-Rahim was traded to the Atlanta Hawks after five seasons with the Grizzlies, while Bibby was traded to the Sacramento Kings. Meanwhile, Jones signed as a free agent with the Detroit Pistons, Strickland signed with the Boston Celtics, and Abdul-Rauf and Doug West both retired.

== Draft picks ==
Round	Pick	Player	Position	Nationality	College
1	2	Stromile Swift	PF/C	United States	LSU Fr.

== Roster ==
2000–01 Vancouver Grizzlies roster
Players

Pos.	No.	Player	Height	Weight	DOB	From
G	1	Mahmoud Abdul-Rauf	6 ft 1 in (1.85 m)	162 lb (73 kg)	3/9/69	LSU
F	3	Shareef Abdur-Rahim	6 ft 9 in (2.06 m)	225 lb (102 kg)	––	California
C	9	Isaac Austin	6 ft 10 in (2.08 m)	255 lb (116 kg)	––	Arizona State
G	10	Mike Bibby	6 ft 2 in (1.88 m)	195 lb (88 kg)	––	Arizona
G	8	Michael Dickerson	6 ft 5 in (1.96 m)	190 lb (86 kg)	––	Arizona
G	21	Kevin Edwards	6 ft 3 in (1.91 m)	190 lb (86 kg)	––	DePaul
G	11	Damon Jones	6 ft 3 in (1.91 m)	185 lb (84 kg)	––	Houston
F	43	Grant Long	6 ft 8 in (2.03 m)	225 lb (102 kg)	––	Eastern Michigan
F/C	44	Tony Massenburg	6 ft 9 in (2.06 m)	220 lb (100 kg)	––	Maryland
C	50	Bryant Reeves	7 ft 0 in (2.13 m)	290 lb (132 kg)	––	Oklahoma State
G	20	Brent Price	6 ft 1 in (1.85 m)	165 lb (75 kg)	––	Oklahoma
G	25	Erick Strickland	6 ft 3 in (1.91 m)	210 lb (95 kg)	––	Nebraska
F/C	4	Stromile Swift	6 ft 9 in (2.06 m)	225 lb (102 kg)	––	LSU
G/F	2	Doug West (injured)	6 ft 6 in (1.98 m)	200 lb (91 kg)	––	Villanova

Coaches
Head coach
- Sidney Lowe
Assistant(s)
- Michael Adams
- Mitchell Anderson
- Scott Roth
- Bob Staak

Legend
- (DP) Unsigned draft pick
- (FA) Free agent
- (S) Suspended
- Injured

Roster
Updated: January 30, 2001

== Regular season ==
=== Season standings ===
Midwest Division	W	L	PCT	GB	Home	Road	Div
z-San Antonio Spurs	58	24	.707	–	33–8	25–16	19–5
x-Utah Jazz	53	29	.646	5	28–13	25–16	14–10
x-Dallas Mavericks	53	29	.646	5	28–13	25–16	14–10
x-Minnesota Timberwolves	47	35	.573	11	30–11	17–24	11–13
e-Houston Rockets	45	37	.549	13	24–17	21–20	11–13
e-Denver Nuggets	40	42	.488	18	29–12	11–30	13–11
e-Vancouver Grizzlies	23	59	.280	35	15–26	8–33	2–22

Western Conference
#	Team	W	L	PCT	GB
1	z-San Antonio Spurs	58	24	.707	–
2	y-Los Angeles Lakers	56	26	.683	2
3	x-Sacramento Kings	55	27	.671	3
4	x-Utah Jazz	53	29	.646	5
5	x-Dallas Mavericks	53	29	.646	5
6	x-Phoenix Suns	51	31	.622	7
7	x-Portland Trail Blazers	50	32	.610	8
8	x-Minnesota Timberwolves	47	35	.573	11
9	e-Houston Rockets	45	37	.549	13
10	e-Seattle SuperSonics	44	38	.537	14
11	e-Denver Nuggets	40	42	.488	18
12	e-Los Angeles Clippers	31	51	.378	27
13	e-Vancouver Grizzlies	23	59	.280	35
14	e-Golden State Warriors	17	65	.207	41

=== Game log ===
#	Date	Opponent	Score	Record	Attendance
1	October 31	Seattle SuperSonics	94–88	1–0	15,779
2	November 2	@ Los Angeles Clippers	99–91	2–0	15,546
3	November 4	Los Angeles Lakers	89–98	2–1	18,183
4	November 6	Atlanta Hawks	97–87	3–1	11,639
5	November 8	@ Dallas Mavericks	101–74	4–1	11,500
6	November 9	@ Houston Rockets	78–85	4–2	10,906
7	November 11	@ San Antonio Spurs	78–91	4–3	18,556
8	November 16	Los Angeles Clippers	72–76	4–4	12,210
9	November 18	Dallas Mavericks	88–91	4–5	13,301
10	November 20	Denver Nuggets	92–95	4–6	11,809
11	November 22	@ Minnesota Timberwolves	100–101	4–7	16,783
12	November 24	@ Detroit Pistons	96–118	4–8	14,709
13	November 26	@ Boston Celtics	98–87	5–8	11,551
14	November 27	@ New York Knicks	72–97	5–9	19,763
15	November 29	Phoenix Suns	109–106 (2OT)	6–9	12,314
16	December 1	Indiana Pacers	76–86 (OT)	6–10	11,758
17	December 3	San Antonio Spurs	79–97	6–11	11,655
18	December 5	Detroit Pistons	91–83	7–11	12,578
19	December 7	@ Utah Jazz	87–98	7–12	17,958
20	December 9	Philadelphia 76ers	79–83	7–13	15,671
21	December 11	Houston Rockets	75–82	7–14	12,145
22	December 13	Seattle SuperSonics	93–94	7–15	15,102
23	December 15	@ Los Angeles Lakers	76–98	7–16	18,211
24	December 17	Orlando Magic	91–101	7–17	13,729
25	December 20	Washington Wizards	118–104	8–17	11,510
26	December 22	Sacramento Kings	93–95	8–18	14,656
27	December 23	@ Los Angeles Clippers	90–92	8–19	12,001
28	December 26	Phoenix Suns	95–97	8–20	16,110
29	December 29	@ Portland Trail Blazers	81–104	8–21	20,309
30	December 30	Golden State Warriors	101–102	8–22	14,485
31	January 3	Charlotte Hornets	99–89	9–22	11,873
32	January 5	@ Phoenix Suns	76–108	9–23	18,359
33	January 7	Milwaukee Bucks	120–117	10–23	11,771
34	January 9	Denver Nuggets	105–112	10–24	12,417
35	January 12	@ Seattle SuperSonics	102–115	10–25	13,196
36	January 13	Cleveland Cavaliers	119–107	11–25	12,540
37	January 15	@ Los Angeles Lakers	112–113 (OT)	11–26	18,318
38	January 17	@ Denver Nuggets	97–121	11–27	12,117
39	January 19	Miami Heat	86–97	11–28	14,281
40	January 21	Minnesota Timberwolves	94–96	11–29	13,108
41	January 23	@ San Antonio Spurs	77–110	11–30	14,764
42	January 25	@ Dallas Mavericks	83–120	11–31	12,690
43	January 26	@ Houston Rockets	89–106	11–32	12,316
44	January 29	New Jersey Nets	97–86	12–32	15,475
45	January 31	@ Phoenix Suns	92–101	12–33	16,502
46	February 2	@ Sacramento Kings	95–105	12–34	17,317
47	February 3	Chicago Bulls	91–84	13–34	16,845
48	February 5	@ Seattle SuperSonics	82–95	13–35	15,082
49	February 7	Utah Jazz	82–92	13–36	13,240
50	February 13	Boston Celtics	99–98	14–36	11,735
51	February 15	Golden State Warriors	99–89	15–36	10,612
52	February 16	@ Golden State Warriors	92–79	16–36	13,173
53	February 18	@ Minnesota Timberwolves	110–102	17–36	18,693
54	February 20	@ Washington Wizards	116–104	18–36	12,240
55	February 21	@ Philadelphia 76ers	91–107	18–37	17,944
56	February 23	@ Milwaukee Bucks	81–93	18–38	17,682
57	February 24	@ Chicago Bulls	75–90	18–39	21,496
58	February 27	Dallas Mavericks	112–116	18–40	12,977
59	February 28	@ Utah Jazz	83–101	18–41	19,452
60	March 3	Los Angeles Lakers	88–98	18–42	19,193
61	March 5	San Antonio Spurs	77–91	18–43	10,798
62	March 6	@ Portland Trail Blazers	105–97	19–43	20,580
63	March 9	Portland Trail Blazers	95–85	20–43	15,512
64	March 11	Toronto Raptors	84–101	20–44	19,193
65	March 13	@ Atlanta Hawks	99–109	20–45	9,664
66	March 14	@ Charlotte Hornets	95–100	20–46	16,018
67	March 16	@ Orlando Magic	99–103	20–47	15,278
68	March 17	@ Miami Heat	81–95	20–48	16,500
69	March 20	@ New Jersey Nets	90–104	20–49	14,531
70	March 22	@ Cleveland Cavaliers	95-109	20–50	12,168
71	March 23	@ Indiana Pacers	75–95	20–51	18,345
72	March 25	@ Toronto Raptors	92–102	20–52	19,800
73	March 29	New York Knicks	89–68	21–52	15,949
74	April 1	Utah Jazz	73–92	21–53	13,093
75	April 4	Los Angeles Clippers	86–78	22–53	11,312
76	April 6	Sacramento Kings	90–118	22–54	14,863
77	April 7	@ Denver Nuggets	97-98	22–55	14,934
78	April 10	Minnesota Timberwolves	91–104	22–56	10,430
79	April 12	Portland Trail Blazers	87–100	22–57	12,796
80	April 14	Houston Rockets	95–110	22–58	18,571
81	April 16	@ Sacramento Kings	100–110	22–59	17,317
82	April 18	@ Golden State Warriors	95–81	23–59	14,437

== Player statistics ==
=== Ragular season ===
Player	POS	GP	GS	MP	REB	AST	STL	BLK	PTS	MPG	RPG	APG	SPG	BPG	PPG
Mike Bibby	PG	82	82	3,190	304	685	107	12	1,301	38.9	3.7	8.4	1.3	.1	15.9
Shareef Abdur-Rahim	SF	81	81	3,241	735	250	90	77	1,663	40.0	9.1	3.1	1.1	1.0	20.5
Stromile Swift	PF	80	6	1,312	284	28	62	82	391	16.4	3.6	.4	.8	1.0	4.9
Bryant Reeves	C	75	48	1,832	452	80	43	54	622	24.4	6.0	1.1	.6	.7	8.3
Damon Jones	PG	71	10	1,415	124	224	36	1	461	19.9	1.7	3.2	.5	.0	6.5
Michael Dickerson	SG	70	69	2,618	229	233	62	27	1,142	37.4	3.3	3.3	.9	.4	16.3
Grant Long	PF	66	27	1,507	274	83	72	15	396	22.8	4.2	1.3	1.1	.2	6.0
Tony Massenburg	PF	52	20	823	210	9	10	28	233	15.8	4.0	.2	.2	.5	4.5
Isaac Austin	C	52	16	845	222	58	20	23	226	16.3	4.3	1.1	.4	.4	4.3
Kevin Edwards	SG	46	5	634	82	52	29	8	160	13.8	1.8	1.1	.6	.2	3.5
Othella Harrington^{†}	C	44	40	1,267	289	36	19	26	480	28.8	6.6	.8	.4	.6	10.9
Mahmoud Abdul-Rauf	PG	41	0	486	25	76	9	1	266	11.9	.6	1.9	.2	.0	6.5
Erick Strickland^{†}	PG	22	0	409	76	66	22	1	140	18.6	3.5	3.0	1.0	.0	6.4
Doug West	SG	15	6	171	15	14	3	4	28	11.4	1.0	.9	.2	.3	1.9
Brent Price	PG	6	0	30	4	5	2	0	13	5.0	.7	.8	.3	.0	2.2

- ^{†} Denotes player spent time with another team in the season. Stats reflect time with the Grizzlies only.
