= 2000–01 Los Angeles Clippers season =

NBA professional basketball team season

- Head coach: Alvin Gentry
- Owners: Donald Sterling
- Arena: Staples Center

Results
- Record: 31–51 (.378)
- Place: Division: 6th (Pacific); Conference: 12th (Western)
- Playoff finish: Did not qualify
- Stats at Basketball Reference

Local media
- Television: Fox Sports Net West 2, KCAL
- Radio: KXTA

The 2000–01 Los Angeles Clippers season was the 31st season for the Los Angeles Clippers in the National Basketball Association, and their 17th season in Los Angeles, California.

== Season summary ==
=== Off-season ===
After finishing with a league-worst 15–67 record the previous season, the Clippers received the third overall pick in the 2000 NBA draft, and selected small forward, and high school basketball star Darius Miles; the team also selected shooting guard Quentin Richardson out of DePaul University with the 18th overall pick. During the off-season, the team acquired second-year guard Corey Maggette, Derek Strong, and rookie point guard, and first-round draft pick Keyon Dooling out of the University of Missouri from the Orlando Magic on draft day, acquired Sean Rooks from the Dallas Mavericks, and hired Alvin Gentry as their new head coach. However, prior to the start of the regular season, center Keith Closs was suspended due to poor conditioning and would miss the entire season.

For the season, the Clippers redesigned their white home uniforms and red road uniforms, adding a V-shaped collar, a blue trim and blue side panels to their jerseys and shorts; the left leg of their shorts featured the team's primary logo. The team's new uniforms would remain in use until 2010.

=== Regular season ===
Under Gentry and with the addition of Miles, Maggette, Richardson and Rooks, the Clippers struggled losing 14 of their first 19 games of the regular season. After 14 games, the team traded Tyrone Nesby to the Washington Wizards. As the season progressed, the Clippers posted a nine-game losing streak in January, and held a 16–34 record at the All-Star break. However, the team played around .500 in winning percentage in the final three months of the season, as they doubled their previous season's win total by finishing in sixth place in the Pacific Division with a 31–51 record.

Second-year star Lamar Odom averaged 17.2 points, 7.8 rebounds, 5.2 assists and 1.6 blocks per game, while Jeff McInnis averaged 12.9 points and 5.5 assists per game, and Miles provided the team with 9.4 points, 5.9 rebounds and 1.5 blocks per game, and was named to the NBA All-Rookie First Team. In addition, three-point specialist Eric Piatkowski provided with 10.6 points per game, and led the Clippers with 120 three-point field goals, while Maggette contributed 10.0 points per game, and Michael Olowokandi averaged 8.5 points, 6.4 rebounds and 1.3 blocks per game. Meanwhile, Richardson contributed 8.1 points per game, Dooling provided with 5.9 points and 2.3 assists per game, and Rooks averaged 5.4 points and 3.7 rebounds.

During the NBA All-Star weekend at the MCI Center in Washington, D.C., Odom, Miles and Richardson were all selected for the NBA Rookie Challenge Game, as Odom was a member of the Sophomores team, while Miles and Richardson were both members of the Rookies team. Meanwhile, Maggette participated in the NBA Slam Dunk Contest. Miles also finished tied in fourth place in Rookie of the Year voting, while Gentry finished tied in fifth place in Coach of the Year voting.

The Clippers finished 24th in the NBA in home-game attendance, with an attendance of 601,587 at the Staples Center during the regular season.

=== Aftermath ===
Following the season, Brian Skinner was traded to the Chicago Bulls on draft day; however, the Bulls soon traded Skinner to the Toronto Raptors, who later on traded him to the Cleveland Cavaliers. Meanwhile, Strong and Closs were both released to free agency.

== Draft picks ==
Round	Pick	Player	Position	Nationality	College / Club Team
1	3	Darius Miles	SF	United States	
1	18	Quentin Richardson	SG/SF	United States	DePaul
2	30	Marko Jaric	G	Serbia	Paf Bologna (Italy)

== Roster ==
2000–01 Los Angeles Clippers roster
Players

Pos.	No.	Player	Height	Weight	DOB	From
G	11	Earl Boykins	5 ft 5 in (1.65 m)	220 lb (100 kg)	1976–06–02	Eastern Michigan
C	33	Keith Closs (S)	7 ft 3 in (2.21 m)	215 lb (98 kg)	1976–04–03	Central Connecticut State
G	1	Keyon Dooling	6 ft 3 in (1.91 m)	190 lb (86 kg)	1980–05–08	Missouri
C	25	Zendon Hamilton	6 ft 11 in (2.11 m)	254 lb (115 kg)	1975–04–27	St. John's
G/F	50	Corey Maggette	6 ft 6 in (1.98 m)	225 lb (102 kg)	1979–11–12	Duke
G	5	Jeff McInnis	6 ft 4 in (1.93 m)	179 lb (81 kg)	1974–10–22	North Carolina
F	21	Darius Miles	6 ft 9 in (2.06 m)	210 lb (95 kg)	1980–10–09	East St. Louis HS (IL)
F	7	Lamar Odom	6 ft 10 in (2.08 m)	221 lb (100 kg)	1979–11–06	Rhode Island
C	34	Michael Olowokandi	7 ft 0 in (2.13 m)	270 lb (122 kg)	1975–04–03	Pacific
C	44	Cherokee Parks	6 ft 11 in (2.11 m)	240 lb (109 kg)	1972–10–11	Duke
G/F	52	Eric Piatkowski	6 ft 7 in (2.01 m)	215 lb (98 kg)	1970–09–30	Nebraska
G/F	3	Quentin Richardson	6 ft 5 in (1.96 m)	238 lb (108 kg)	1980–04–13	DePaul
C	45	Sean Rooks	6 ft 10 in (2.08 m)	260 lb (118 kg)	1969–09–09	Arizona
F/C	32	Brian Skinner	6 ft 9 in (2.06 m)	230 lb (104 kg)	1976–05–19	Michigan
F	30	Derek Strong	6 ft 9 in (2.06 m)	240 lb (109 kg)	1968–02–09	Xavier

Coaches
Head coach
- Alvin Gentry
Assistant(s)
- Dennis Johnson
- John Hammond
- Rex Kalamian
- Igor Kokoskov

Legend
- (DP) Unsigned draft pick
- (FA) Free agent
- (S) Suspended
- Injured

Roster
Updated: 2000-12-01

=== Roster Notes ===
- Center Sean Rooks and power forward Derek Strong both became the 8th, and 9th former Lakers to play for the crosstown rival Clippers.
- Center Keith Closs was suspended indefinitely due to lack of physical conditioning.

== Regular season ==
=== Season standings ===
Pacific Division	W	L	PCT	GB	Home	Road	Div
y-Los Angeles Lakers	56	26	.683	–	31–10	25–16	14–10
x-Sacramento Kings	55	27	.671	1	33–8	22–19	16–8
x-Phoenix Suns	51	31	.622	5	31–10	20–21	12–12
x-Portland Trail Blazers	50	32	.610	6	28–13	22–19	12–12
e-Seattle SuperSonics	44	38	.537	12	26–15	18–23	17–7
e-Los Angeles Clippers	31	51	378	25	22–19	9–32	9–15
e-Golden State Warriors	17	65	.207	39	11–30	6–35	4–20

Western Conference
#	Team	W	L	PCT	GB
1	z-San Antonio Spurs	58	24	.707	–
2	y-Los Angeles Lakers	56	26	.683	2
3	x-Sacramento Kings	55	27	.671	3
4	x-Utah Jazz	53	29	.646	5
5	x-Dallas Mavericks	53	29	.646	5
6	x-Phoenix Suns	51	31	.622	7
7	x-Portland Trail Blazers	50	32	.610	8
8	x-Minnesota Timberwolves	47	35	.573	11
9	e-Houston Rockets	45	37	.549	13
10	e-Seattle SuperSonics	44	38	.537	14
11	e-Denver Nuggets	40	42	.488	18
12	e-Los Angeles Clippers	31	51	.378	27
13	e-Vancouver Grizzlies	23	59	.280	35
14	e-Golden State Warriors	17	65	.207	41

== Player statistics ==
Legend
GP	Games played	GS	Games started	MPG	Minutes per game
FG%	Field-goal percentage	3P%	3-point field-goal percentage	FT%	Free-throw percentage
RPG	Rebounds per game	APG	Assists per game	SPG	Steals per game
BPG	Blocks per game	PPG	Points per game

Player	GP	GS	MPG	FG%	3P%	FT%	RPG	APG	SPG	BPG	PPG
Lamar Odom	76	74	37.3	46.0	31.6	67.9	7.8	5.2	1.0	1.6	17.2
Jeff McInnis	81	81	35.0	46.3	36.1	80.7	2.7	5.5	0.9	0.1	12.9
Eric Piatkowski	81	40	26.5	43.3	40.4	87.3	3.0	1.2	0.6	0.2	10.6
Corey Maggette	69	9	19.7	46.2	30.4	77.4	4.2	1.2	0.5	0.1	10.0
Darius Miles	81	21	26.3	50.5	5.3	52.1	5.9	1.2	0.6	1.5	9.4
Michael Olowokandi	82	82	25.9	43.5	0.0	54.5	6.4	0.6	0.4	1.3	8.5
Quentin Richardson	76	28	17.9	44.2	33.1	62.7	3.4	0.8	0.6	0.1	8.1
Tyrone Nesby	14	12	23.8	32.5	21.7	78.3	3.0	0.8	0.7	0.3	7.7
Earl Boykins	10	0	14.9	39.7	12.5	82.4	1.1	3.2	0.5	0.0	6.5
Keyon Dooling	76	1	16.3	40.9	35.0	69.8	1.2	2.3	0.5	0.1	5.9
Sean Rooks	82	0	18.9	42.8	50.0	74.8	3.7	0.9	0.4	0.8	5.4
Cherokee Parks	52	31	16.8	49.2	0.0	70.4	3.6	0.8	0.4	0.5	4.8
Derek Strong	28	8	17.5	38.5	0.0	75.7	3.9	0.3	0.5	0.0	4.2
Brian Skinner	39	23	15.0	39.8	0.0	54.2	4.3	0.5	0.4	0.3	4.1
Zendon Hamilton	3	0	6.3	22.2	0.0	62.5	2.7	0.0	0.0	0.0	3.0

Player statistics citation:

== Awards, records and milestones ==
=== Awards ===
==== All-Star ====
- Corey Maggette participated in the NBA Slam Dunk Contest during NBA All Star Weekend. This makes him only the second Clipper player to compete in the Slam Dunk Contest.

== Transactions ==
The Clippers have been involved in the following transactions during the 2000–01 season.

=== Trades ===
June 28, 2000
To Los Angeles Clippers

- Corey Maggette, Derek Strong, draft rights to Keyon Dooling & 2000 2nd-round draft pick
To Orlando Magic

- 2006 1st-round draft pick
June 28, 2000
To Los Angeles Clippers

- Sean Rooks
To Dallas Mavericks

- Eric Murdock & 2000 2nd-round draft pick
November 28, 2000
To Los Angeles Clippers

- Obinna Ekezie & Cherokee Parks
To Washington Wizards

- Tyrone Nesby

=== Free agents ===
==== Additions ====
Player	Signed	Former team
Zendon Hamilton	September 29	Dafni Athens (Greek A2 League)
Earl Boykins	September 29	Orlando Magic

==== Subtractions ====
Player	Left	New team
Anthony Avent	free agency, July 1	PAOK Thessaloniki BC (GBL)
Charles R. Jones	waived, July 7	Libertad de Sunchales (LNB)
Derek Anderson	free agency, August 4	San Antonio Spurs
Maurice Taylor	free agency, August 25	Houston Rockets
Pete Chilcutt	free agency, October 4	Atlanta Hawks
Etdrick Bohannon	waived, October 25	New York Knicks
Obinna Ekezie	waived, December 1	Washington Wizards

Player Transactions Citation:

== See also ==
- 2000-01 NBA season
