= 2000–01 San Antonio Spurs season =

- Division champions
- Head coach: Gregg Popovich
- President: Gregg Popovich (vice)
- General manager: Gregg Popovich
- Owner: Peter Holt
- Arena: Alamodome

Results
- Record: 58–24 (.707)
- Place: Division: 1st (Midwest); Conference: 1st (Western)
- Playoff finish: Western Conference finals (lost to Lakers 0–4)
- Stats at Basketball Reference

Local media
- Television: Fox Sports Net Southwest, KRRT, KBEJ
- Radio: KLEY

The 2000–01 San Antonio Spurs season was the 25th season for the San Antonio Spurs in the National Basketball Association, their 28th season in San Antonio, Texas, and their 34th season as a franchise.

== Season summary ==
=== Off-season ===
During the off-season, the Spurs signed free agents Derek Anderson, and Danny Ferry. All-Star forward Tim Duncan had nearly signed a free-agent deal with the Orlando Magic, who had offered him a six-year contract worth $67.5 million; however, Duncan decided to stay with the Spurs.

=== Regular season ===
With the addition of Anderson and Ferry, the Spurs got off to a 13–9 start to the regular season, then won ten of their next twelve games, and held a 31–16 record at the All-Star break. The Spurs continued to be among the NBA's elite teams, winning 23 of their final 29 games to recapture the Midwest Division title with a 58–24 record, which was the best record in the league, as they earned the first seed in the Western Conference, while posting a league-best 33–8 home record at the Alamodome.

Duncan averaged 22.2 points, 12.2 rebounds and 2.3 blocks per game, and was named to the All-NBA First Team, and to the NBA-All Defensive First Team, while David Robinson averaged 14.4 points, 8.6 rebounds and 2.5 blocks per game, and was named to the All-NBA Third Team. In addition, Anderson provided the team with 15.5 points, 3.7 assists and 1.5 steals per game, and also led them with 101 three-point field goals, while Antonio Daniels contributed 9.4 points and 3.8 assists per game off the bench, Sean Elliott provided 7.9 points per game in only 52 games, and Malik Rose averaged 7.7 points and 5.4 rebounds per game off the bench in only 57 games. Three-point specialist Terry Porter contributed 7.2 points per game, Avery Johnson provided 5.6 points and 4.3 assists per game, and Ferry also contributed 5.6 points per game.

During the NBA All-Star weekend at the MCI Center in Washington, D.C., Duncan and Robinson were both selected for the 2001 NBA All-Star Game, as members of the Western Conference All-Star team; it was Robinson's final All-Star appearance. Duncan also finished in second place in Most Valuable Player voting, behind Allen Iverson of the Philadelphia 76ers, and in third place in Defensive Player of the Year voting, while Robinson finished tied in fifth place.

The Spurs led the NBA in home-game attendance, with an attendance of 913,176 at the Alamodome during the regular season.

=== NBA playoffs ===
In the Western Conference First Round of the 2001 NBA playoffs, the Spurs faced off against the 8th–seeded Minnesota Timberwolves, a team that featured All-Star forward Kevin Garnett, Terrell Brandon, and second-year star Wally Szczerbiak. The Spurs won the first two games over the Timberwolves at home at the Alamodome, before losing Game 3 on the road, 93–84 at the Target Center. The Spurs won Game 4 over the Timberwolves on the road, 97–84 to win the series in four games.

In the Western Conference Semi-finals, the team faced off against the 5th–seeded Dallas Mavericks, who were led by the quartet of All-Star guard Michael Finley, Dirk Nowitzki, Juwan Howard and Steve Nash. The Spurs won the first two games over the Mavericks at the Alamodome, before winning Game 3 on the road, 104–90 at the Reunion Arena to take a 3–0 series lead. After losing Game 4 on the road by a score of 112–108, the Spurs won Game 5 over the Mavericks at the Alamodome, 105–87 to win the series in five games.

In the Western Conference Finals, the Spurs then faced off against the 2nd–seeded, and defending NBA champion Los Angeles Lakers, who won the Pacific Division title, and were led by All-Star center Shaquille O'Neal, All-Star guard Kobe Bryant, and Derek Fisher. Despite having home-court advantage in the series, the Spurs lost their first two home games at the Alamodome, as the Lakers took a 2–0 series lead. In Game 3, the Spurs suffered a 39-point margin loss to the Lakers on the road, 111–72 at the Staples Center, only shooting .321 in field-goal percentage. The Spurs lost Game 4 to the Lakers on the road, 111–82, thus losing the series in a four-game sweep.

The Lakers would advance to the NBA Finals for the second consecutive year, and defeat the 76ers in five games in the 2001 NBA Finals, winning their second consecutive NBA championship.

=== Aftermath ===
Following the season, Anderson and Steve Kerr were both traded to the Portland Trail Blazers, while Johnson re-signed as a free agent with his former team, the Denver Nuggets. Meanwhile, Samaki Walker signed with the Los Angeles Lakers, and Elliott retired after twelve seasons in the NBA, eleven in which he spent playing with the Spurs.

== Draft picks ==
Round	Pick	Player	Position	Nationality	College
2	41	Chris Carrawell	G	United States	Duke
2	54	Cory Hightower	F	United States	Indian Hills Community College

== Roster ==
2000–01 San Antonio Spurs roster
Players

Pos.	No.	Player	Height	Weight	DOB	From
G/F	1	Derek Anderson	6 ft 5 in (1.96 m)	194 lb (88 kg)	1974–07–18	Kentucky
G	33	Antonio Daniels	6 ft 4 in (1.93 m)	205 lb (93 kg)	1975–03–19	Bowling Green
G	5	Derrick Dial (injured)	6 ft 4 in (1.93 m)	184 lb (83 kg)	1975–12–20	Eastern Michigan
F/C	21	Tim Duncan	6 ft 11 in (2.11 m)	255 lb (116 kg)	1976–04–25	Wake Forest
F	32	Sean Elliott	6 ft 8 in (2.03 m)	220 lb (100 kg)	1968–02–02	Arizona
F	35	Danny Ferry	6 ft 10 in (2.08 m)	230 lb (104 kg)	1966–10–17	Duke
G	2	Jaren Jackson (injured)	6 ft 4 in (1.93 m)	180 lb (82 kg)	1967–10–27	Syracuse
G	6	Avery Johnson	5 ft 10 in (1.78 m)	240 lb (109 kg)	1965–03–25	Southern
G	4	Steve Kerr	6 ft 3 in (1.91 m)	175 lb (79 kg)	1965–09–27	Arizona
F	3	Ira Newble (injured)	6 ft 7 in (2.01 m)	220 lb (100 kg)	1975–01–20	Miami (OH)
G	30	Terry Porter	6 ft 3 in (1.91 m)	195 lb (88 kg)	1963–04–08	UW–Stevens Point
C	50	David Robinson	7 ft 1 in (2.16 m)	235 lb (107 kg)	1965–08–06	Navy
F	31	Malik Rose	6 ft 7 in (2.01 m)	250 lb (113 kg)	1974–11–23	Drexel
C	36	Shawnelle Scott	6 ft 10 in (2.08 m)	250 lb (113 kg)	1972–06–16	St. John's
F/C	52	Samaki Walker	6 ft 9 in (2.06 m)	250 lb (113 kg)	1976–02–25	Louisville

Coaches
Head coach
- Gregg Popovich
Assistant(s)
- Mike Brown
- Mike Budenholzer
- Hank Egan
- Joe Prunty

Legend
- (DP) Unsigned draft pick
- (FA) Free agent
- (S) Suspended
- Injured

Roster

== Regular season ==
=== Season standings ===
Midwest Division	W	L	PCT	GB	Home	Road	Div
z-San Antonio Spurs	58	24	.707	–	33–8	25–16	19–5
x-Utah Jazz	53	29	.646	5	28–13	25–16	14–10
x-Dallas Mavericks	53	29	.646	5	28–13	25–16	14–10
x-Minnesota Timberwolves	47	35	.573	11	30–11	17–24	11–13
e-Houston Rockets	45	37	.549	13	24–17	21–20	11–13
e-Denver Nuggets	40	42	.488	18	29–12	11–30	13–11
e-Vancouver Grizzlies	23	59	.280	35	15–26	8–33	2–22

Western Conference
#	Team	W	L	PCT	GB
1	z-San Antonio Spurs	58	24	.707	–
2	y-Los Angeles Lakers	56	26	.683	2
3	x-Sacramento Kings	55	27	.671	3
4	x-Utah Jazz	53	29	.646	5
5	x-Dallas Mavericks	53	29	.646	5
6	x-Phoenix Suns	51	31	.622	7
7	x-Portland Trail Blazers	50	32	.610	8
8	x-Minnesota Timberwolves	47	35	.573	11
9	e-Houston Rockets	45	37	.549	13
10	e-Seattle SuperSonics	44	38	.537	14
11	e-Denver Nuggets	40	42	.488	18
12	e-Los Angeles Clippers	31	51	.378	27
13	e-Vancouver Grizzlies	23	59	.280	35
14	e-Golden State Warriors	17	65	.207	41

z - clinched division title
y - clinched division title
x - clinched playoff spot

== Game log ==
=== Regular season ===
2000–01 game log
Total: 58–24 (home: 33–8; road: 25–16)
October: 1–0 (home: 1–0; road: 0–0)

Game	Date	Team	Score	High points	High rebounds	High assists	Location Attendance	Record
1	October 31	Indiana	W 98–85	David Robinson (22)	Tim Duncan (10)	Antonio Daniels (6)	Alamodome; 17,450	1–0

November: 9–4 (home: 7–0; road: 2–4)

Game	Date	Team	Score	High points	High rebounds	High assists	Location Attendance	Record
2	November 2	Timberwolves	W 103–91	Derek Anderson (29)	Malik Rose (10)	Derek Anderson (5)	Alamodome; 14,193	2–0
3	November 4	@ Golden State	W 117–105	Malik Rose (26)	Tim Duncan (13)	Avery Johnson (6)	The Arena in Oakland; 16,121	3–0
4	November 7	@ Phoenix	L 81–100	Tim Duncan (18)	Tim Duncan (10)	Avery Johnson (5)	America West Arena; 16,683	3–1
5	November 8	L. A. Lakers	W 91–81	Tim Duncan (22)	Tim Duncan (17)	Avery Johnson, Antonio Daniels (7)	Alamodome; 26,065	4–1
6	November 10	@ Dallas	L 77–79	Derek Anderson (17)	Tim Duncan, David Robinson (14)	Tim Duncan (4)	Reunion Arena; 17,296	4–2
7	November 11	Vancouver	W 91–78	Tim Duncan (20)	Tim Duncan (13)	Antonio Daniels (7)	Alamodome; 18,556	5–2
8	November 14	Utah	W 86–79	Tim Duncan, Derek Anderson (15)	Tim Duncan (12)	Avery Johnson (6)	Alamodome; 17,296	6–2
9	November 16	@ Washington	W 99–95	David Robinson (21)	David Robinson (14)	Tim Duncan (6)	MCI Center; 19,832	7–2
10	November 17	@ Minnesota	L 94–99 (OT)	Tim Duncan (22)	Tim Duncan (14)	Tim Duncan, Avery Johnson (5)	Target Center; 17,288	7–3
11	November 22	Seattle	W 112–85	Malik Rose (22)	Tim Duncan (12)	Avery Johnson (6)	Alamodome; 22,828	8–3
12	November 24	@ Denver	L 92–102	Tim Duncan (21)	Tim Duncan (14)	Tim Duncan (5)	Pepsi Center; 13,300	8–4
13	November 25	Philadelphia	W 96–76	Derek Anderson, Antonio Daniels (16)	David Robinson (8)	Antonio Daniels (5)	Alamodome; 33,046	9–4
14	November 29	Sacramento	W 82–79	Tim Duncan (22)	Tim Duncan (13)	Avery Johnson (8)	Alamodome; 17,341	10–4

December: 9–7 (home: 5–2; road: 4–5)

Game	Date	Team	Score	High points	High rebounds	High assists	Location Attendance	Record
15	December 1	@ L. A. Lakers	L 100–109	Tim Duncan (24)	Tim Duncan (11)	Derek Anderson, Avery Johnson (5)	Staples Center; 18,997	10–5
16	December 3	@ Vancouver	W 97–79	Tim Duncan (30)	Tim Duncan (10)	Derek Anderson, Antonio Daniels (7)	General Motors Place; 11,655	11–5
17	December 5	@ Sacramento	L 75–81	Tim Duncan (23)	Tim Duncan (23)	Terry Porter (4)	ARCO Arena; 17,317	11–6
18	December 7	New York	L 83–86	Tim Duncan (28)	Tim Duncan (10)	Avery Johnson (3)	Alamodome; 18,370	11–7
19	December 9	Chicago	W 105–81	Tim Duncan (17)	Tim Duncan (10)	Terry Porter, Avery Johnson (5)	Alamodome; 19,447	12–7
20	December 11	@ Utah	W 91–83	Derek Anderson (18)	Malik Rose (11)	Antonio Daniels (4)	Delta Center; 19,911	13–7
21	December 13	@ Phoenix	L 93–103	Derek Anderson (26)	Tim Duncan (11)	Tim Duncan, Derek Anderson (3)	America West Arena; 17,333	13–8
22	December 14	Denver	L 96–102	David Robinson (23)	David Robinson (12)	Antonio Daniels (6)	Alamodome; 15,248	13–9
23	December 16	Phoenix	W 90–82	David Robinson (18)	Tim Duncan (8)	Antonio Daniels (6)	Alamodome; 30,555	14–9
24	December 19	@ Houston	W 86–79	Tim Duncan (25)	Tim Duncan (15)	Derek Anderson (4)	Compaq Center; 12,937	15–9
25	December 20	Cleveland	W 94–77	Danny Ferry (16)	David Robinson (13)	Terry Porter (7)	Alamodome; 17,336	16–9
26	December 22	Golden State	W 105–87	Tim Duncan (18)	Tim Duncan (13)	Tim Duncan, Derek Anderson (4)	Alamodome; 16,481	17–9
27	December 23	@ Charlotte	L 84–88	Tim Duncan (29)	Tim Duncan (16)	Antonio Daniels (8)	Charlotte Coliseum; 15,079	17–10
28	December 26	Houston	W 103–95	Antonio Daniels (26)	David Robinson (12)	Antonio Daniels (10)	Alamodome; 21,343	18–10
29	December 28	@ Chicago	L 104–105	David Robinson (28)	David Robinson (8)	Derek Anderson (7)	United Center; 21,793	18–11
30	December 30	@ Indiana	W 89–77	Malik Rose (20)	Malik Rose (13)	Derek Anderson (7)	Conseco Fieldhouse; 18,345	19–11

January: 9–4 (home: 4–2; road: 5–2)

Game	Date	Team	Score	High points	High rebounds	High assists	Location Attendance	Record
31	January 2	Miami	W 80–72	Antonio Daniels (19)	David Robinson, Tim Duncan (10)	Sean Elliott (5)	Alamodome; 18,412	20–11
32	January 6	Detroit	W 108–101	David Robinson (29)	David Robinson (22)	Derek Anderson, Antonio Daniels (6)	Alamodome; 20,333	21–11
33	January 9	@ Orlando	W 112–95	David Robinson (26)	Tim Duncan (11)	Derek Anderson (7)	TD Waterhouse Centre; 14,320	22–11
34	January 12	@ Detroit	W 111–90	Derek Anderson (25)	Tim Duncan (11)	Tim Duncan (7)	The Palace of Auburn Hills; 14,576	23–11
35	January 13	@ Philadelphia	L 83–100	Tim Duncan (29)	David Robinson, Danny Ferry (7)	Antonio Daniels (6)	First Union Center; 20,607	23–12
36	January 15	@ New York	L 82–104	Antonio Daniels, Tim Duncan, Ira Newble (14)	Tim Duncan (10)	Derek Anderson (4)	Madison Square Garden; 19,763	23–13
37	January 17	Toronto	L 91–98	Tim Duncan (22)	Tim Duncan (11)	Derek Anderson, Terry Porter (4)	Alamodome; 17,044	23–14
38	January 20	Orlando	L 109–112 (OT)	Tim Duncan (29)	Tim Duncan, David Robinson (17)	Antonio Daniels (12)	Alamodome; 31,888	23–15
39	January 23	Vancouver	W 110–77	Tim Duncan (23)	Samaki Walker (13)	Antonio Daniels (8)	Alamodome; 14,764	24–15
40	January 25	@ Sacramento	W 97–91	Tim Duncan (36)	Tim Duncan (21)	Antonio Daniels (10)	ARCO Arena; 17,317	25–15
41	January 27	@ Utah	W 99–86	Tim Duncan (33)	Tim Duncan, Terry Porter (10)	Terry Porter (8)	Delta Center; 19,911	26–15
42	January 29	@ L. A. Clippers	W 96–67	Tim Duncan (16)	Tim Duncan, Derek Anderson (8)	Derek Anderson (7)	Staples Center; 14,721	27–15
43	January 31	L. A. Clippers	W 92–70	Tim Duncan (22)	Tim Duncan (16)	Derek Anderson (5)	Alamodome; 13,738	28–15

February: 9–4 (home: 5–2; road: 4–2)

Game	Date	Team	Score	High points	High rebounds	High assists	Location Attendance	Record
44	February 3	Houston	W 90–88	Tim Duncan (28)	Tim Duncan (11)	Derek Anderson (9)	Alamodome; 24,870	29–15
45	February 5	Golden State	W 109–85	Tim Duncan (24)	Tim Duncan (12)	Tim Duncan, Malik Rose, Derrick Dial (4)	Alamodome; 13,889	30–15
46	February 7	@ Golden State	W 107–89	Tim Duncan (23)	Tim Duncan (12)	Antonio Daniels (12)	Gund Arena; 13,324	31–15
47	February 8	@ New Jersey	L 97–99	Tim Duncan (35)	Tim Duncan (21)	Terry Porter (7)	Continental Airlines Arena; 12,740	31–16
All-Star Break
48	February 13	Dallas	W 104–92	Tim Duncan (28)	Tim Duncan (15)	Tim Duncan, Derek Anderson (6)	Alamodome; 17,705	32–16
49	February 15	Washington	W 102–78	Tim Duncan (19)	Tim Duncan (12)	Antonio Daniels (6)	Alamodome; 14,613	33–16
50	February 16	@ Minnesota	W 91–85	Tim Duncan (26)	Tim Duncan (12)	Antonio Daniels (4)	Target Center; 18,881	34–16
51	February 18	@ Toronto	W 92–74	Tim Duncan (20)	Tim Duncan (13)	David Robinson (5)	Air Canada Centre; 19,800	35–16
52	February 19	@ Milwaukee	L 98–102	Derek Anderson (25)	Tim Duncan (13)	Derek Anderson, Antonio Daniels (6)	Bradley Center; 16,487	35–17
53	February 21	L. A. Lakers	L 99–101	Derek Anderson (23)	Derek Anderson, David Robinson (8)	Terry Porter (8)	Alamodome; 29,849	35–18
54	February 23	Boston	L 99–101	Derek Anderson (20)	Tim Duncan, David Robinson (10)	Tim Duncan (6)	Alamodome; 24,996	36–18
55	February 24	Dallas	W 107–104	Tim Duncan (31)	Tim Duncan (13)	Derek Anderson (6)	Reunion Arena; 18,187	37–18
56	February 27	Portland	L 87–95	Tim Duncan (31)	Tim Duncan (13)	Derek Anderson (6)	Alamodome; 20,323	37–19

March: 9–3 (home: 5–1; road: 4–2)

Game	Date	Team	Score	High points	High rebounds	High assists	Location Attendance	Record
57	March 1	Phoenix	W 91–71	Tim Duncan (25)	David Robinson (11)	Terry Porter (9)	Alamodome; 16,209	38–19
58	March 3	Atlanta	W 124–95	Tim Duncan (26)	David Robinson (15)	Danny Ferry (4)	Alamodome; 29,974	39–19
59	March 5	Vancouver	W 91–77	Derek Anderson (25)	Tim Duncan (13)	Antonio Daniels (5)	General Motors Place; 10,798	40–19
60	March 6	@ Seattle	W 101–73	Tim Duncan (22)	Tim Duncan, David Robinson (9)	Avery Johnson (6)	KeyArena; 14,392	41–19
61	March 8	@ Portland	W 93–79	Derek Anderson (29)	Tim Duncan (16)	Tim Duncan (6)	Rose Garden Arena; 20,267	42–19
62	March 9	@ L. A. Lakers	W 93–89 (OT)	Tim Duncan (29)	Tim Duncan (12)	Avery Johnson (5)	Staples Center; 18,997	43–19
63	March 12	L. A. Clippers	W 99–81	Tim Duncan (28)	David Robinson (12)	Antonio Daniels (6)	Alamodome; 21,974	44–19
64	March 14	Minnesota	W 106–100 (OT)	Derek Anderson (30)	Tim Duncan (20)	Terry Porter (5)	Alamodome; 35,676	45–19
65	March 16	New Jersey	W 95–86	Tim Duncan (29)	Tim Duncan (16)	Avery Johnson (5)	Alamodome; 21,726	46–19
66	March 17	@ Houston	L 99–103	Tim Duncan (25)	Tim Duncan (16)	Derek Anderson, Avery Johnson (5)	Compaq Center; 16,285	46–20
67	March 19	Portland	W 98–85	Derek Anderson (28)	Tim Duncan (23)	Terry Porter (10)	Alamodome; 22,393	47–20
68	March 21	@ Boston	W 97–77	Derek Anderson (26)	Tim Duncan (14)	Avery Johnson (7)	FleetCenter; 15,764	48–20
69	March 22	@ Atlanta	W 115–101	Derek Anderson (23)	David Robinson, Tim Duncan (10)	Terry Porter (8)	Philips Arena; 12,124	49–20
70	March 25	@ Atlanta	L 83–88	Tim Duncan (26)	Tim Duncan (14)	Derek Anderson (4)	AmericanAirlines Arena; 16,500	49–21
71	March 27	Charlotte	W 93–79	Tim Duncan (34)	Tim Duncan (19)	Avery Johnson (5)	Alamodome; 22,109	50–21
72	March 29	Utah	W 106–88	Tim Duncan (29)	Tim Duncan (7)	Derek Anderson (6)	Alamodome; 24,327	51–21
73	March 31	Milwaukee	L 77–86	Tim Duncan (20)	Tim Duncan (12)	Avery Johnson (5)	Alamodome; 35,944	51–22

April: 7–2 (home: 3–1; road: 4–1)

Game	Date	Team	Score	High points	High rebounds	High assists	Location Attendance	Record
74	April 3	Seattle	W 107–89	Tim Duncan (30)	Tim Duncan (14)	Avery Johnson (10)	Alamodome; 19,672	52–22
75	April 5	@ Denver	W 101–80	Tim Duncan (36)	Tim Duncan (13)	Avery Johnson (12)	Pepsi Center; 13,796	53–22
76	April 7	@ L. A. Clippers	W 93–83	Tim Duncan (32)	Tim Duncan (18)	Tim Duncan (6)	Staples Center; 18,964	54–22
77	April 8	@ Golden State	W 84–76	Tim Duncan (28)	Tim Duncan (9)	Avery Johnson (4)	The Arena in Oakland; 15,273	55–22
78	April 10	Dallas	W 91–79	David Robinson (34)	David Robinson (11)	Tim Duncan (6)	Alamodome; 25,682	56–22
79	April 12	Sacramento	L 105–107 (OT)	Tim Duncan (42)	Tim Duncan, David Robinson (11)	Tim Duncan, Avery Johnson (5)	Alamodome; 34,357	56–23
80	April 14	Denver	W 111–95	David Robinson (25)	Tim Duncan (15)	Derek Anderson (7)	Alamodome; 34,397	57–23
81	April 17	@ Portland	W 99–93	Tim Duncan (18)	David Robinson (9)	Antonio Daniels (6)	Rose Garden Arena; 20,580	58–23
82	April 18	@ Seattle	L 67–105	Shawnelle Scott (14)	Shawnelle Scott (14)	Derek Anderson (5)	KeyArena; 16,049	58–24

2000–01 season schedule

=== Playoffs ===
2001 playoff game log
First Round: 3–1 (home: 2–0; road: 1–1)

Game	Date	Team	Score	High points	High rebounds	High assists	Location Attendance	Series
1	April 21	Minnesota	W 87–82	Tim Duncan (33)	Tim Duncan (15)	Duncan, Ferry (4)	Alamodome; 33,983	1–0
2	April 23	Minnesota	W 86–69	Tim Duncan (18)	Duncan, Robinson (11)	Duncan, Porter (4)	Alamodome; 31,759	2–0
3	April 28	@ Minnesota	L 84–93	David Robinson (22)	David Robinson (17)	Derek Anderson (4)	Target Center; 17,676	2–1
4	April 30	@ Minnesota	W 97–84	Tim Duncan (24)	Tim Duncan (16)	Derek Anderson (6)	Target Center; 16,336	3–1

Conference semifinals: 4–1 (home: 3–0; road: 1–1)

Game	Date	Team	Score	High points	High rebounds	High assists	Location Attendance	Series
1	May 5	Dallas	W 94–78	Tim Duncan (31)	Tim Duncan (13)	Avery Johnson (8)	Alamodome; 32,798	1–0
2	May 7	Dallas	W 100–86	Tim Duncan (25)	Tim Duncan (22)	Terry Porter (9)	Alamodome; 27,690	2–0
3	May 9	@ Dallas	W 104–90	David Robinson (19)	Duncan, Robinson (14)	Avery Johnson (6)	Reunion Arena; 18,237	3–0
4	May 12	@ Dallas	L 108–112	Tim Duncan (29)	Tim Duncan (18)	Terry Porter (8)	Reunion Arena; 18,187	3–1
5	May 14	Dallas	W 105–87	Tim Duncan (32)	Tim Duncan (20)	Antonio Daniels (9)	Alamodome; 25,853	4–1

Conference finals: 0–4 (home: 0–2; road: 0–2)

Game	Date	Team	Score	High points	High rebounds	High assists	Location Attendance	Series
1	May 19	L.A. Lakers	L 90–104	Tim Duncan (28)	Tim Duncan (14)	Tim Duncan (6)	Alamodome; 36,068	0–1
2	May 21	L.A. Lakers	L 81–88	Tim Duncan (40)	Tim Duncan (15)	Antonio Daniels (5)	Alamodome; 35,574	0–2
3	May 25	@ L.A. Lakers	L 72–111	David Robinson (24)	Tim Duncan (13)	Tim Duncan (7)	Staples Center; 18,997	0–3
4	May 27	@ L.A. Lakers	L 82–111	Daniels, Duncan (15)	David Robinson (11)	Terry Porter (4)	Staples Center; 18,997	0–4

2001 schedule

== Player statistics ==
=== Regular season ===
Player	POS	GP	GS	MP	REB	AST	STL	BLK	PTS	MPG	RPG	APG	SPG	BPG	PPG
Tim Duncan	PF	82	82	3,174	997	245	70	192	1,820	38.7	12.2	3.0	.9	2.3	22.2
Derek Anderson	SG	82	82	2,859	363	301	120	14	1,269	34.9	4.4	3.7	1.5	.2	15.5
David Robinson	C	80	80	2,371	691	116	80	197	1,151	29.6	8.6	1.5	1.0	2.5	14.4
Terry Porter	PG	80	42	1,678	201	251	52	11	573	21.0	2.5	3.1	.7	.1	7.2
Danny Ferry	SF	80	29	1,688	223	71	28	21	448	21.1	2.8	.9	.4	.3	5.6
Antonio Daniels	PG	79	23	2,060	163	304	61	14	745	26.1	2.1	3.8	.8	.2	9.4
Samaki Walker	PF	61	1	963	243	29	10	41	321	15.8	4.0	.5	.2	.7	5.3
Malik Rose	PF	57	9	1,219	308	48	59	40	437	21.4	5.4	.8	1.0	.7	7.7
Avery Johnson	PG	55	20	1,290	85	237	33	4	310	23.5	1.5	4.3	.6	.1	5.6
Steve Kerr	PG	55	1	650	35	57	16	1	181	11.8	.6	1.0	.3	.0	3.3
Sean Elliott	SF	52	34	1,229	170	81	23	25	409	23.6	3.3	1.6	.4	.5	7.9
Derrick Dial	SG	33	0	207	38	21	4	6	86	6.3	1.2	.6	.1	.2	2.6
Ira Newble	SF	27	6	184	35	6	2	4	54	6.8	1.3	.2	.1	.1	2.0
Shawnelle Scott	C	27	1	144	50	4	5	6	43	5.3	1.9	.1	.2	.2	1.6
Jaren Jackson	SG	16	0	114	12	7	5	0	39	7.1	.8	.4	.3	.0	2.4

=== Playoffs ===
Player	POS	GP	GS	MP	REB	AST	STL	BLK	PTS	MPG	RPG	APG	SPG	BPG	PPG
Tim Duncan	PF	13	13	526	188	49	14	35	317	40.5	14.5	3.8	1.1	2.7	24.4
David Robinson	C	13	13	409	153	22	17	31	216	31.5	11.8	1.7	1.3	2.4	16.6
Terry Porter	PG	13	13	326	24	44	11	0	108	25.1	1.8	3.4	.8	.0	8.3
Danny Ferry	SF	13	11	334	41	17	4	1	75	25.7	3.2	1.3	.3	.1	5.8
Antonio Daniels	PG	13	8	406	26	38	7	1	176	31.2	2.0	2.9	.5	.1	13.5
Avery Johnson	PG	13	0	281	16	41	10	1	76	21.6	1.2	3.2	.8	.1	5.8
Malik Rose	PF	13	0	215	49	4	3	1	64	16.5	3.8	.3	.2	.1	4.9
Sean Elliott	SF	12	0	239	26	14	5	6	57	19.9	2.2	1.2	.4	.5	4.8
Samaki Walker	PF	12	0	76	14	3	1	1	14	6.3	1.2	.3	.1	.1	1.2
Steve Kerr	PG	9	0	101	9	6	4	1	30	11.2	1.0	.7	.4	.1	3.3
Derek Anderson	SG	7	7	194	19	17	3	0	54	27.7	2.7	2.4	.4	.0	7.7
Shawnelle Scott	C	7	0	13	2	0	0	0	3	1.9	.3	.0	.0	.0	.4

== Awards and records ==
- Tim Duncan, All-NBA First Team
- David Robinson, All-NBA Third Team
- Tim Duncan, NBA All-Defensive First Team

== See also ==
- 2000-01 NBA season
