= 2000–01 Seattle SuperSonics season =

NBA professional basketball team season

- Head coach: Paul Westphal (fired) (6–9); Nate McMillan (38–29)
- General manager: Wally Walker
- Owner: Barry Ackerley
- Arena: KeyArena at Seattle Center

Results
- Record: 44–38 (.537)
- Place: Division: 5th (Pacific); Conference: 10th (Western)
- Playoff finish: Did not qualify
- Stats at Basketball Reference

Local media
- Television: KONG; Fox Sports Net Northwest
- Radio: KJR

The 2000–01 Seattle SuperSonics season was the 34th season for the Seattle SuperSonics in the National Basketball Association.

== Season summary ==
=== Off-season ===
The SuperSonics had the 17th overall pick in the 2000 NBA draft, and selected small forward Desmond Mason out of Oklahoma State University. During the off-season, the team acquired All-Star center Patrick Ewing from the New York Knicks in a four-team trade, and signed free agent Pervis Ellison, but released him to free agency after nine games.

=== Regular season ===
Despite the addition of Ewing and Mason, the SuperSonics struggled losing seven of their first ten games of the regular season. Head coach Paul Westphal was fired after a 6–9 start to the season, and was replaced with former SuperSonics guard Nate McMillan. Under McMillan, the SuperSonics played above .500 in winning percentage for the remainder of the season, holding a 28–24 record at the All-Star break, and finishing in fifth place in the Pacific Division with a 44–38 record. However, the team failed to qualify for the NBA playoffs by finishing in tenth place in the Western Conference.

Gary Payton averaged 23.1 points, 8.1 assists and 1.6 steals per game, contributed 102 three-point field goals, and was named to the All-NBA Third Team, and to the NBA All-Defensive First Team, while Rashard Lewis showed improvement becoming the team's starting small forward, averaging 14.8 points and 6.9 rebounds per game, and also leading the SuperSonics with 123 three-point field goals, and Ruben Patterson averaged 13.0 points per game. In addition, Vin Baker provided the team with 12.2 points and 5.7 rebounds per game, while Ewing provided with 9.6 points, 7.4 rebounds and 1.2 blocks per game, Brent Barry contributed 8.8 points and 3.4 assists per game along with 109 three-point field goals, while shooting .476 in three-point percentage, Shammond Williams provided with 6.8 points and 2.8 assists per game, and Mason contributed 5.9 points per game off the bench, and was named to the NBA All-Rookie Second Team.

During the NBA All-Star weekend at the MCI Center in Washington, D.C., Payton was selected for the 2001 NBA All-Star Game, as a member of the Western Conference All-Star team. Meanwhile Lewis participated in the NBA Three-Point Shootout, and Mason won the NBA Slam Dunk Contest. The SuperSonics finished 17th in the NBA in home-game attendance, with an attendance of 640,847 at the KeyArena at Seattle Center during the regular season.

=== Aftermath ===
Following the season, Ewing signed as a free agent with the Orlando Magic after only one season with the SuperSonics, and Patterson signed with the Portland Trail Blazers.

== Draft picks ==
Round	Pick	Player	Position	Nationality	College/club team
1	17	Desmond Mason	SG/SF	United States	Oklahoma State
2	42	Olumide Oyedeji	C	Nigeria	DJK Würzburg
2	47	Josip Sesar	SG	Croatia	Cibona Zagreb

== Roster ==
2000–01 Seattle SuperSonics roster
Players

Pos.	No.	Player	Height	Weight	DOB	From
F	42	Vin Baker	6 ft 11 in (2.11 m)	232 lb (105 kg)	1971–11–23	Hartford
G	31	Brent Barry	6 ft 6 in (1.98 m)	185 lb (84 kg)	1971–12–31	Oregon State
G	15	Emanual Davis	6 ft 4 in (1.93 m)	195 lb (88 kg)	1968–08–27	Delaware State
C	33	Patrick Ewing	7 ft 0 in (2.13 m)	240 lb (109 kg)	1962–08–05	Georgetown
F	7	Rashard Lewis	6 ft 10 in (2.08 m)	235 lb (107 kg)	1979–08–08	Alief Elsik HS (TX)
F	24	Desmond Mason	6 ft 7 in (2.01 m)	224 lb (102 kg)	1977–10–11	Oklahoma State
C	34	Jelani McCoy (injured)	6 ft 10 in (2.08 m)	245 lb (111 kg)	1977–12–06	UCLA
C	00	Olumide Oyedeji	6 ft 10 in (2.08 m)	240 lb (109 kg)	1981–05–11	Nigeria
F	21	Ruben Patterson	6 ft 5 in (1.96 m)	224 lb (102 kg)	1975–07–31	Cincinnati
G	20	Gary Payton	6 ft 4 in (1.93 m)	180 lb (82 kg)	1968–07–23	Oregon State
G	1	Shammond Williams	6 ft 1 in (1.85 m)	201 lb (91 kg)	1975–04–05	North Carolina
G	25	David Wingate	6 ft 5 in (1.96 m)	185 lb (84 kg)	1963–12–15	Georgetown
F	45	Rubén Wolkowyski	6 ft 10 in (2.08 m)	270 lb (122 kg)	1973–09–30	Argentina

Coaches
Head coach
- Paul Westphal (fired)
- Nate McMillan
Assistant(s)
- Dwane Casey
- Dwight Daub
- Bob Weiss

Legend
- (DP) Unsigned draft pick
- (FA) Free agent
- (S) Suspended
- Injured

Roster
Updated: January 18, 2001

=== Roster Notes ===
- Power forward Pervis Ellison was waived on December 16, 2000.
- Point guard Shammond Williams holds American and Georgian dual citizenship. He was born in the United States, but he played on the Georgian national team.

== Regular season ==
=== Standings ===
Pacific Division	W	L	PCT	GB	Home	Road	Div
y-Los Angeles Lakers	56	26	.683	–	31–10	25–16	14–10
x-Sacramento Kings	55	27	.671	1	33–8	22–19	16–8
x-Phoenix Suns	51	31	.622	5	31–10	20–21	12–12
x-Portland Trail Blazers	50	32	.610	6	28–13	22–19	12–12
e-Seattle SuperSonics	44	38	.537	12	26–15	18–23	17–7
e-Los Angeles Clippers	31	51	378	25	22–19	9–32	9–15
e-Golden State Warriors	17	65	.207	39	11–30	6–35	4–20

Western Conference
#	Team	W	L	PCT	GB
1	z-San Antonio Spurs	58	24	.707	–
2	y-Los Angeles Lakers	56	26	.683	2
3	x-Sacramento Kings	55	27	.671	3
4	x-Utah Jazz	53	29	.646	5
5	x-Dallas Mavericks	53	29	.646	5
6	x-Phoenix Suns	51	31	.622	7
7	x-Portland Trail Blazers	50	32	.610	8
8	x-Minnesota Timberwolves	47	35	.573	11
9	e-Houston Rockets	45	37	.549	13
10	e-Seattle SuperSonics	44	38	.537	14
11	e-Denver Nuggets	40	42	.488	18
12	e-Los Angeles Clippers	31	51	.378	27
13	e-Vancouver Grizzlies	23	59	.280	35
14	e-Golden State Warriors	17	65	.207	41

== Player statistics ==
Legend
GP	Games played	GS	Games started	MPG	Minutes per game
FG%	Field-goal percentage	3P%	3-point field-goal percentage	FT%	Free-throw percentage
RPG	Rebounds per game	APG	Assists per game	SPG	Steals per game
BPG	Blocks per game	PPG	Points per game

Player	GP	GS	MPG	FG%	3P%	FT%	RPG	APG	SPG	BPG	PPG
Vin Baker	76	27	28.0	.422	.063	.723	5.7	1.2	0.5	1.0	12.2
Brent Barry	67	20	26.5	.494	.476	.816	3.1	3.4	1.2	0.2	8.8
Emanual Davis	62	39	20.8	.418	.394	.818	2.5	2.2	1.0	0.2	5.8
Pervis Ellison	9	0	4.4	.286	–	1.000	1.3	0.3	0.0	0.2	0.7
Patrick Ewing	79	79	26.7	.430	.000	.685	7.4	1.2	0.7	1.2	9.6
Rashard Lewis	78	78	34.9	.480	.432	.826	6.9	1.6	1.2	0.6	14.8
Desmond Mason	78	14	19.5	.431	.269	.736	3.2	0.8	0.5	0.3	5.9
Jelani McCoy	70	44	16.3	.523	–	.441	3.6	0.8	0.3	0.7	4.5
Olumide Oyedeji	30	1	7.4	.486	–	.750	2.2	0.1	0.2	0.3	1.5
Ruben Patterson	76	22	27.1	.494	.056	.681	5.0	2.1	1.4	0.6	13.0
Gary Payton	79	79	41.1	.456	.375	.766	4.6	8.1	1.6	0.3	23.1
Shammond Williams	69	6	17.9	.438	.459	.875	1.9	2.8	0.4	0.1	6.8
David Wingate	1	0	9.0	1.000	–	–	0.0	2.0	0.0	0.0	6.0
Rubén Wolkowyski	34	1	9.0	.316	.000	.735	1.4	0.1	0.2	0.5	2.2

Player statistics citation:

== Awards and records ==
=== Awards ===
- Gary Payton, All-NBA Third Team
- Gary Payton, NBA All-Defensive First Team
- Desmond Mason, NBA All-Rookie Team 2nd Team

== Transactions ==
=== Free agents ===
==== Additions ====
Player	Signed	Former team

==== Subtractions ====
Player	Left	New team

== See also ==
- 2000–01 NBA season
