= Utah's 10th State Senate district =

American legislative district

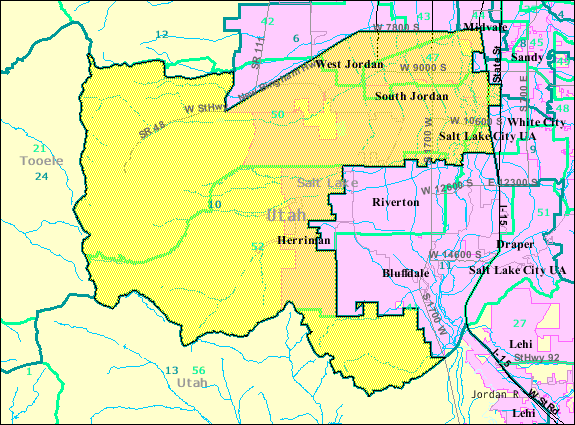
Map of the 10th Utah Senate District.

The 10th Utah Senate District is located in West Jordan, South Jordan and Herriman. It includes Utah House Districts 41, 42, 47, and 50 and 52. The current State Senator representing the 10th district is Lincoln Fillmore. Fillmore was elected to the Utah Senate in a special election after Senator Osmond resigned.

== Previous Utah State Senators (District 10) ==
| Name | Party | Term |
|---|---|---|
| Aaron Osmond | Republican | 2011-2015 |
| Chris Buttars | Republican | 2002–2011 |
| L. Alma Mansell | Republican | 1995–2002 |
| Arnold Christensen | Republican | 1979–1994 |
| M. James Macfarlane | Democratic | 1973–1979 |
| Edward T. Beck | Democratic | 1969–1972 |
| Carl R. Clark | Republican | 1967 |
| Vernon L. Holman | Democratic | 1961–1965 |
| Royal T. Harward | Republican | 1957–1959 |
| H. Roland Tietjen | Republican | 1953–1955 |
| Lewis H. Larsen | Republican | 1949–1951 |
| W. Wallace Houston | Republican | 1945–1947 |
| McKinley Morrill | Republican | 1941–1943 |
| Silas E. Tanner | Democratic | 1937–1939 |
| William T. Owens | | 1929–1931 |
| D.H. Robinson | | 1925–1927 |
| H.C. Tebbs | | 1921–1923 |
| Quince Kimball | | 1917–1919 |
| Joseph Eckersley | | 1913–1915 |
| R.W. Sevy | | 1909–1911 |
| Willis Johnson | | 1901–1907 |
| Isaac K. Wright | | 1897–1899 |
| John F. Chidester | Democratic | 1896 |

== Election results ==
=== 2004 General Election ===
Utah State Senate election, 2004
| Party | Candidate | Votes | % | ±% |
|---|---|---|---|---|
| Republican | D. Chris Buttars | 21,866 | 64.9 | |
| Democratic | Joey R. Foote | 11,822 | 35.1 | |
| Write In | Randy L. Browning | 6 | 0.0 | |

=== 2008 General Election Results ===
Note: Official results 11-19-08.

| District | Party | Incumbent | Status | Party | Candidate | Votes | % | Change from 2004 |
|---|---|---|---|---|---|---|---|---|
| 10 | Republican | D. Chris Buttars (West Jordan) | Winner | Constitution | Steve Maxfield | 2,128 | 5.33% | |
| 10 | Republican | D. Chris Buttars (West Jordan) | Winner | Democratic | John Rendell | 17,986 | 45.07% | |
| 10 | Republican | D. Chris Buttars (West Jordan) | Winner | Republican | D. Chris Buttars | 19,766 | 49.53% | |

== See also ==
- Utah Democratic Party
- Utah Republican Party
- Utah Senate
