= Senator Osmond =

Senator Osmond may refer to:

- Aaron Osmond (born 1969), Utah State Senate
- George Osmond (politician) (1836–1913), Wyoming State Senate
