= Chris Buttars =

American politician

Member of the Utah Senate from the 10th district
- In office January 15, 2001 – March 11, 2011
- Preceded by: L. Alma Mansell
- Succeeded by: Aaron Osmond

Personal details
- Born: April 1, 1942 Logan, Utah, U.S.
- Died: September 10, 2018 (aged 76) West Jordan, Utah, U.S.
- Party: Republican
- Spouse: Helen
- Education: Utah State University (BS)

D. Chris Buttars (April 1, 1942 – September 10, 2018) was an American politician who served in the Utah State Senate representing the 10th Utah Senate District. He began his service as a state senator in 2001 and resigned in 2011 citing health problems.

== Early life and career ==
Buttars was born in Logan, Utah on April 1, 1942, and graduated from Utah State University with a B.S. in Marketing/Economics in 1967. Upon graduating from Utah State University he was employed at Amoco Oil Company from 1967 to 1976 as a Retail Sales Manager. In 1976 he became the Executive Director of the Petroleum Retails Organization. He was director of the Utah Boys Ranch, now known as West Ridge Academy, a boarding school for boys.

Buttars was married to Helen; they had six children and lived in West Jordan, Utah. He successfully ran for the West Jordan City Council in 1970, and served on the City Council until 1983. Buttars ran for the Utah Senate in 2000, and served as Utah State Senator for district 10 from 2001 to 2011. Buttars served in various Republican Party leadership positions. Buttars was also a recipient of the Boy Scouts of America's Silver Beaver Award for distinguished service to the BSA. He died in 2018 after a period of declining health.

== Legislation and policy ==
Buttars sponsored legislation against gay straight alliances in public schools, introduced a resolution urging companies to have their employees say "Merry Christmas" rather than "Happy Holidays" to customers, as well as an Intelligent Design Bill. Buttars sponsored legislation to fund drug treatment programs, supported raising the minimum wage and assisting child crime victims.

In February, 2010, Buttars proposed eliminating the 12th grade from Utah high schools to close a budget shortfall.

=== Intelligent design ===
During the 2006 General Session of the 56th Utah State Legislature Buttars sponsored S.B. 96, an Intelligent Design Bill. The bill would allow instructors to teach students that evolution is a controversial theory and counter it with the pseudoscience of Creationism, using the term "Divine Design." The New York Times called the bill "Anti-Darwin" and critics have pointed to Buttars' words "Divine Design" as evidence for its religious undertone. The bill passed in the Senate but failed in the House of Representatives.

=== Accusations of racism ===
In an interview with radio hosts Tom Grover & Ryan Yonk, Buttars said that he "[doesn't] know of an example where the minority is being jeopardized by legislative action." When Grover mentioned Brown v. Board of Education, which desegregated American schools, Buttars responded that he thought "Brown v. Board of Education is wrong to begin with." In response to public reaction to his statements and accusations of racism, Buttars responded, "I don't think there's a racial [sic] bone in my body..." and "I don't see black and white. I see people. I always have."

During a debate of a school-funding bill on the floor of the State Senate in February 2008, the bill's sponsor compared the bill to the baby involved in the Biblical story of King Solomon. Buttars responded saying, "This baby is black, I'll tell you. This is a dark, ugly thing." Buttars apologized for a remark on the State Senate floor, saying, "I got a little carried away, and I made a comment that I think a lot of people could take as racist. I certainly did not mean that in any way, but it was wrong and could easily be taken in just that way. I apologize to anyone who took offense." In an interview, Buttars said, "We live in a very, very sensitive world. Although what I said had literally nothing in my mind to do with a human being at all — we were talking about an ugly bill — I made a statement that could be easily misinterpreted, and it was."

Accusations of racism were made an issue in his 2008 re-election bid against Democrat John Rendell. Less than six months after Buttars' re-election, he was recorded saying of the ACLU, "bless their black little hearts," in an interview with documentary maker and former KTVX ABC 4 reporter Reed Cowan. Cowan’s documentary is called, "8: The Mormon Proposition."

=== Gay rights ===
Buttars was outspoken on issues dealing with homosexuality, and co-sponsored Utah Constitutional Amendment 3 with Utah Boys Ranch colleague LaVar Christensen, which defined marriage in Utah as consisting "only of the legal union between a man and a woman." Buttars criticized the domestic partnership executive order signed by Salt Lake City Mayor Rocky Anderson. Buttars also introduced legislation that would ban gay clubs and gay-straight alliances in public schools.

In 2008 Salt Lake City's newly elected Mayor Ralph Becker introduced a domestic partnership registry that was unanimously approved by the City Council. On February 11, 2008 Buttars introduced a counter bill, SB0267, designed to prevent cities or counties from operating any kind of domestic partnership registry, on the grounds that such registries would violate Utah Constitutional Amendment 3's ban on same-sex marriage and domestic unions. The bill failed.

In a January 2009 interview with openly gay documentary filmmaker Reed Cowan, for the documentary 8: The Mormon Proposition, Buttars said that gays and lesbians were "the greatest threat to America going down," comparing members of the LGBT community to radical Muslims. "I believe they will destroy the foundation of the American society," he said.

On February 20, 2009, Buttars was removed as chairman and member of the Utah State Senate Judicial Standing Committee because of these remarks. Democrats pushed for further sanctions, demanding his removal from the Rules Committee and for his demotion on the Health and Human Services Committee. The Church of Jesus Christ of Latter-day Saints issued a statement urging "civil and respectful dialogue." It said, "From the outset, the Church's position has always been to engage in civil and respectful dialogue on this issue. Senator Buttars does not speak for the church."

== Electoral history ==
=== 2000 ===
2000 District 5 Utah State Senate election
Party	Candidate	Votes	%
Democratic	Bennion Spencer	11,556	31
Republican	D. Chris Buttars	23,717	64
Independent American	Kent L. Shelton	1,698	5
Republican hold			

=== 2004 ===
2004 District 10 Utah State Senate election
Party	Candidate	Votes	%	±%
Democratic	Joey R. Foote	11,822	35.1	+4.1
Republican	D. Chris Buttars (inc.)	21,866	64.9	+0.9
Republican hold				

=== 2008 ===
2008 District 10 Utah State Senate election
Party	Candidate	Votes	%	±%
Democratic	John Rendell	17,986	45.1	+10.0
Republican	D. Chris Buttars (inc.)	19,766	49.6	−15.3
Constitution	Steve Maxfield	2,128	5.3	+5.3
Republican hold				

== See also ==
- Utah Boys Ranch
- List of Utah State Legislatures
- Utah Republican Party
- Utah Senate
