= 2000–01 Dallas Mavericks season =

NBA professional basketball team season

- Head coach: Don Nelson
- General manager: Don Nelson
- Owner: Mark Cuban
- Arena: Reunion Arena

Results
- Record: 53–29 (.646)
- Place: Division: 3rd (Midwest); Conference: 5th (Western)
- Playoff finish: Conference semifinals (lost to Spurs 1–4)
- Stats at Basketball Reference

Local media
- Television: Fox Sports Net Southwest; KTXA
- Radio: KSKY

The 2000–01 Dallas Mavericks season was the 21st season for the Dallas Mavericks in the National Basketball Association.

== Season summary ==
=== Off-season ===
The Mavericks received the twelfth overall pick in the 2000 NBA draft, and selected power forward Etan Thomas out of Syracuse University. The Mavericks also made several trades on draft day. The team acquired shooting guard, and first-round draft pick Courtney Alexander out of Fresno State University from the Orlando Magic, power forward, and first-round draft pick Donnell Harvey out of the University of Florida from the New York Knicks, and power forward, and second-round draft pick Eduardo Nájera out of the University of Oklahoma from the Houston Rockets.

During the off-season, the Mavericks acquired Christian Laettner and Loy Vaught from the Detroit Pistons in two separate trades, and acquired Howard Eisley from the Utah Jazz in a four-team trade. However, before the start of the regular season, Thomas suffered a toe injury, and would never play for the Mavericks.

=== Regular season ===
After ten seasons of struggling, the Mavericks showed improvement by winning ten of their first fifteen games of the regular season, and played above .500 in winning percentage for the entire season, as the team held a 31–19 record at the All-Star break. At mid-season, the Mavericks traded Laettner, Thomas, Vaught, Alexander and Hubert Davis to the Washington Wizards in exchange for Juwan Howard, second-year center Calvin Booth, and second-year forward Obinna Ekezie. The team also signed free agent Vernon Maxwell, who was previously released by the Philadelphia 76ers. The Mavericks finished in third place in the Midwest Division with a 53–29 record, earned the fifth seed in the Western Conference, and qualified for the NBA playoffs for the first time since the 1989–90 season, ending a ten-year playoff drought.

Dirk Nowitzki averaged 21.8 points and 9.2 rebounds per game, led the Mavericks with 151 three-point field goals, and was named to the All-NBA Third Team, while Michael Finley averaged 21.5 points, 5.2 rebounds, 4.4 assists and 1.4 steals per game, and Howard provided the team with 17.8 points and 7.1 rebounds per game in 27 games after the trade. In addition, Steve Nash showed improvement averaging 15.6 points and 7.3 assists per game, while Eisley contributed 9.0 points and 3.6 assists per game, along with 107 three-point field goals, and Shawn Bradley provided with 7.1 points, 7.4 rebounds and 2.8 blocks per game.

During the NBA All-Star weekend at the MCI Center in Washington, D.C., Finley was selected for the 2001 NBA All-Star Game, as a member of the Western Conference All-Star team; it was his second and final All-Star appearance. Meanwhile, Nowitzki and Nash both participated in the NBA Three-Point Shootout; it was the second consecutive year that Nowitzki participated in the Three-Point Shootout. Nash also finished in third place in Most Improved Player voting, while Nowitzki finished tied in fifth place, and head coach Don Nelson finished in third place in Coach of the Year voting.

The Mavericks finished 14th in the NBA in home-game attendance, with an attendance of 680,238 at the Reunion Arena during the regular season.

=== NBA playoffs ===
In the Western Conference First Round of the 2001 NBA playoffs, the Mavericks faced off against the 4th–seeded Utah Jazz, who were led by All-Star forward Karl Malone, Bryon Russell, and All-Star guard John Stockton. The Mavericks lost the first two games to the Jazz on the road, which included a Game 2 loss at the Delta Center by a score of 109–98, as the Jazz took a 2–0 series lead. However, the Mavericks managed to win the next two games at home, including a Game 4 win over the Jazz at the Reunion Arena, 107–77 to even the series. The Mavericks won Game 5 over the Jazz at the Delta Center, 84–83 to win in a hard-fought five-game series; the team won their first NBA playoff series since the 1987–88 season.

In the Western Conference Semi-finals, the team faced off against the top–seeded, and Midwest Division champion San Antonio Spurs, who were led by All-Star forward Tim Duncan, All-Star center David Robinson, and Derek Anderson. The Spurs took a 3–0 series lead, but the Mavericks managed to win Game 4 at the Reunion Arena, 112–108. However, the Mavericks lost Game 5 to the Spurs on the road, 105–87 at the Alamodome, thus losing the series in five games.

=== Aftermath ===
This was also the Mavericks' final season in which they played their home games at the Reunion Arena. Following the season, Eisley was traded to the New York Knicks in a three-team trade, while Gary Trent signed with the Minnesota Timberwolves. Meanwhile, Booth signed with the Seattle SuperSonics, Ekezie was released to free agency, and Maxwell retired.

== Draft picks ==
Round	Pick	Player	Position	Nationality	College
1	12	Etan Thomas	C	United States	Syracuse
2	31	Dan Langhi	PF	United States	Vanderbilt
2	58	Pete Mickeal	F	United States	Cincinnati

== Roster ==
2000–01 Dallas Mavericks roster
Players

Pos.	No.	Player	Height	Weight	DOB	From
C	52	Calvin Booth	6 ft 11 in (2.11 m)	230 lb (104 kg)	1976–05–07	Penn State
C	44	Shawn Bradley	7 ft 6 in (2.29 m)	235 lb (107 kg)	1972–03–22	BYU
F	2	Mark Bryant	6 ft 9 in (2.06 m)	245 lb (111 kg)	1965–04–25	Seton Hall
G	21	Greg Buckner	6 ft 4 in (1.93 m)	210 lb (95 kg)	1976–09–16	Clemson
G	9	Howard Eisley	6 ft 2 in (1.88 m)	177 lb (80 kg)	1972–12–04	Boston College
G/F	4	Michael Finley	6 ft 7 in (2.01 m)	215 lb (98 kg)	1973–03–06	Wisconsin
F	1	Donnell Harvey	6 ft 8 in (2.03 m)	220 lb (100 kg)	1980–08–26	Florida
F	5	Juwan Howard	6 ft 9 in (2.06 m)	240 lb (109 kg)	1973–02–07	Michigan
G	3	Vernon Maxwell	6 ft 4 in (1.93 m)	180 lb (82 kg)	1965–09–12	Florida
F	14	Eduardo Nájera	6 ft 8 in (2.03 m)	240 lb (109 kg)	1976–07–11	Oklahoma
G	13	Steve Nash	6 ft 3 in (1.91 m)	195 lb (88 kg)	1974–02–07	Santa Clara
F/C	41	Dirk Nowitzki	7 ft 0 in (2.13 m)	237 lb (108 kg)	1978–06–19	Germany
F	33	Gary Trent	6 ft 8 in (2.03 m)	250 lb (113 kg)	1974–09–22	Ohio
C	16	Wang Zhizhi	7 ft 0 in (2.13 m)	255 lb (116 kg)	1977–07–08	China

Coaches
Head coach
- Don Nelson
Assistant(s)
- Rolando Blackman
- Brad Davis (player development)
- Del Harris
- Sidney Moncrief
- Donnie Nelson
- Charlie Parker
- Kiki VanDeWeghe

Legend
- (DP) Unsigned draft pick
- (FA) Free agent
- (S) Suspended
- Injured

Roster
Updated: February 28, 2001

=== Roster notes ===
- Center Shawn Bradley holds both American and German citizenship.

== Regular season ==
=== Standings ===
Midwest Division	W	L	PCT	GB	Home	Road	Div
z-San Antonio Spurs	58	24	.707	–	33–8	25–16	19–5
x-Utah Jazz	53	29	.646	5	28–13	25–16	14–10
x-Dallas Mavericks	53	29	.646	5	28–13	25–16	14–10
x-Minnesota Timberwolves	47	35	.573	11	30–11	17–24	11–13
e-Houston Rockets	45	37	.549	13	24–17	21–20	11–13
e-Denver Nuggets	40	42	.488	18	29–12	11–30	13–11
e-Vancouver Grizzlies	23	59	.280	35	15–26	8–33	2–22

Western Conference
#	Team	W	L	PCT	GB
1	z-San Antonio Spurs	58	24	.707	–
2	y-Los Angeles Lakers	56	26	.683	2
3	x-Sacramento Kings	55	27	.671	3
4	x-Utah Jazz	53	29	.646	5
5	x-Dallas Mavericks	53	29	.646	5
6	x-Phoenix Suns	51	31	.622	7
7	x-Portland Trail Blazers	50	32	.610	8
8	x-Minnesota Timberwolves	47	35	.573	11
9	e-Houston Rockets	45	37	.549	13
10	e-Seattle SuperSonics	44	38	.537	14
11	e-Denver Nuggets	40	42	.488	18
12	e-Los Angeles Clippers	31	51	.378	27
13	e-Vancouver Grizzlies	23	59	.280	35
14	e-Golden State Warriors	17	65	.207	41

z = clinched division title
y = clinched division title
x = clinched playoff spot

=== Game log ===
2000–01 game log
Total: 53–29 (home: 28–13; road: 25–16)
October: 1–0 (home: 1–0; road: 0–0)

Game	Date	Team	Score	High points	High rebounds	High assists	Location Attendance	Record
1	October 31	Milwaukee	W 97–93	Michael Finley (26)	Greg Buckner (11)	Michael Finley (8)	Reunion Arena; 16,600	1–0

November: 9–6 (home: 4–3; road: 5–3)

Game	Date	Team	Score	High points	High rebounds	High assists	Location Attendance	Record
2	November 2	Indiana	W 94–88	Steve Nash (18)	Shawn Bradley (7)	Steve Nash (5)	Reunion Arena; 11,750	2–0
3	November 4	Utah	L 106–112	Steve Nash (24)	Shawn Bradley (14)	Steve Nash (12)	Reunion Arena; 16,500	2–1
4	November 6	@ Denver	W 108–96	Michael Finley (26)	Finley, Nowitzki (6)	Howard Eisley (8)	Pepsi Center; 11,190	3–1
5	November 8	Vancouver	L 74–101	Christian Laettner (17)	Shawn Bradley (9)	Howard Eisley (5)	Reunion Arena; 11,500	3–2
6	November 10	San Antonio	W 79–77	Michael Finley (20)	Dirk Nowitzki (10)	Steve Nash (7)	Reunion Arena; 17,296	4–2
7	November 12	@ Sacramento	L 84–109	Dirk Nowitzki (16)	Loy Vaught (8)	Steve Nash (4)	ARCO Arena; 17,317	4–3
8	November 13	@ L.A. Clippers	W 90–76	Shawn Bradley (22)	Shawn Bradley (8)	Michael Finley (5)	Staples Center; 9,340	5–3
9	November 15	@ Phoenix	L 78–99	Steve Nash (19)	Greg Buckner (10)	Steve Nash (6)	America West Arena; 16,652	5–4
10	November 17	@ Seattle	W 99–95	Michael Finley (26)	Dirk Nowitzki (14)	Steve Nash (9)	KeyArena; 12,285	6–4
11	November 18	@ Vancouver	W 91–88	Nowitzki, Davis (20)	Dirk Nowitzki (10)	Steve Nash (4)	General Motors Place; 13,301	7–4
12	November 20	@ Utah	W 107–98	Michael Finley (29)	Dirk Nowitzki (14)	Steve Nash (17)	Delta Center; 18,869	8–4
13	November 21	Seattle	L 110–116	Hubert Davis (32)	Shawn Bradley (8)	Steve Nash (12)	Reunion Arena; 15,100	8–5
14	November 25	Denver	W 108–84	Dirk Nowitzki (24)	Dirk Nowitzki (13)	Finley, Eisley (6)	Reunion Arena; 16,234	9–5
15	November 28	Toronto	W 107–93	Michael Finley (32)	Bradley, Vaught (7)	Steve Nash (10)	Reunion Arena; 16,016	10–5
16	November 30	@ Portland	L 84–95	Courtney Alexander (20)	Dirk Nowitzki (9)	Christian Laettner (5)	Rose Garden Arena; 19,980	10–6

December: 10–6 (home: 5–2; road: 5–4)

Game	Date	Team	Score	High points	High rebounds	High assists	Location Attendance	Record
17	December 2	@ Golden State	W 97–78	Dirk Nowitzki (24)	Shawn Bradley (14)	Michael Finley (10)	The Arena in Oakland; 12,187	11–6
18	December 3	@ L.A. Lakers	L 97–99	Dirk Nowitzki (25)	Dirk Nowitzki (11)	Howard Eisley (10)	Staples Center; 18,997	11–7
19	December 5	@ Houston	L 102–109	Dirk Nowitzki (35)	Dirk Nowitzki (12)	Howard Eisley (7)	Compaq Center; 11,426	11–8
20	December 6	New York	W 94–85	Michael Finley (21)	Dirk Nowitzki (14)	Steve Nash (6)	Reunion Arena; 14,551	12–8
21	December 8	Chicago	W 105–86	Steve Nash (22)	three players tied (7)	Steve Nash (5)	Reunion Arena; 16,600	13–8
22	December 10	@ New Jersey	W 99–73	Dirk Nowitzki (31)	Dirk Nowitzki (8)	Eisley, Nash (6)	Continental Airlines Arena; 10,654	14–8
23	December 12	@ Cleveland	L 87–92	Steve Nash (21)	Michael Finley (7)	Steve Nash (8)	Gund Arena; 12,577	14–9
24	December 13	@ Indiana	L 92–97	Howard Eisley (27)	Dirk Nowitzki (7)	Steve Nash (8)	Conseco Fieldhouse; 16,740	14–10
25	December 15	@ Philadelphia	W 112–94	Dirk Nowitzki (36)	Laettner, Davis (8)	Steve Nash (13)	First Union Center; 18,563	15–10
26	December 17	@ Detroit	W 99–90	Dirk Nowitzki (25)	Dirk Nowitzki (7)	Steve Nash (9)	The Palace of Auburn Hills; 11,389	16–10
27	December 18	@ Boston	W 106–98	Dirk Nowitzki (31)	Shawn Bradley (6)	Steve Nash (14)	FleetCenter; 11,327	17–10
28	December 20	Portland	W 106–101	Dirk Nowitzki (29)	Nowitzki, Bradley (12)	Steve Nash (8)	Reunion Arena; 17,750	18–10
29	December 22	L.A. Lakers	L 103–108	Dirk Nowitzki (29)	Dirk Nowitzki (10)	Finley, Nash (8)	Reunion Arena; 18,201	18–11
30	December 26	Seattle	W 114–93	Michael Finley (38)	Dirk Nowitzki (11)	three players tied (8)	Reunion Arena; 13,755	19–11
31	December 28	L.A. Clippers	W 105–96	Michael Finley (25)	Dirk Nowitzki (15)	Steve Nash (8)	Reunion Arena; 14,260	20–11
32	December 30	Houston	L 99–114	Michael Finley (32)	Michael Finley (9)	Steve Nash (6)	Reunion Arena; 18,187	20–12

January: 8–6 (home: 3–4; road: 5–2)

Game	Date	Team	Score	High points	High rebounds	High assists	Location Attendance	Record
33	January 3	Detroit	L 104–107	Michael Finley (35)	Dirk Nowitzki (12)	Steve Nash (9)	Reunion Arena; 12,789	20–13
34	January 5	@ Toronto	W 115–105	Dirk Nowitzki (29)	Shawn Bradley (14)	Steve Nash (8)	Air Canada Centre; 19,800	21–13
35	January 6	@ Washington	W 103–85	Dirk Nowitzki (28)	Shawn Bradley (17)	Steve Nash (13)	MCI Center; 12,741	22–13
36	January 8	@ Chicago	W 104–91	Michael Finley (30)	Finley, Nowitzki (10)	Steve Nash (8)	United Center; 21,344	23–13
37	January 10	@ Minnesota	W 106–86	Dirk Nowitzki (28)	Laettner, Bradley (9)	Steve Nash (11)	Target Center; 16,274	24–13
38	January 11	@ Milwaukee	L 94–102	Michael Finley (30)	Christian Laettner (12)	Howard Eisley (4)	Bradley Center; 15,675	24–14
39	January 13	Phoenix	L 86–103	Michael Finley (27)	Shawn Bradley (13)	Michael Finley (6)	Reunion Arena; 18,187	24–15
40	January 15	Sacramento	L 105–116	Dirk Nowitzki (28)	Dirk Nowitzki (11)	Howard Eisley (8)	Reunion Arena; 18,187	24–16
41	January 17	@ Charlotte	W 91–90	Dirk Nowitzki (27)	Loy Vaught (10)	Howard Eisley (8)	Charlotte Coliseum; 14,134	25–16
42	January 18	Orlando	W 115–106 (OT)	Dirk Nowitzki (38)	Dirk Nowitzki (17)	Howard Eisley (7)	Reunion Arena; 13,355	26–16
43	January 20	Denver	W 97–79	Dirk Nowitzki (27)	Dirk Nowitzki (12)	Howard Eisley (10)	Reunion Arena; 18,187	27–16
44	January 23	Philadelphia	L 98–114	Michael Finley (27)	Dirk Nowitzki (15)	Finley, Nash (7)	Reunion Arena; 18,187	27–17
45	January 25	Vancouver	W 120–83	Steve Nash (21)	Dirk Nowitzki (10)	Steve Nash (7)	Reunion Arena; 12,690	28–17
46	January 27	@ Denver	L 100–102	Michael Finley (32)	Dirk Nowitzki (14)	Nowitzki, Finley (6)	Pepsi Center; 19,099	28–18

February: 8–4 (home: 5–2; road: 3–2)

Game	Date	Team	Score	High points	High rebounds	High assists	Location Attendance	Record
47	February 1	Miami	W 95–91 (OT)	Michael Finley (26)	Shawn Bradley (13)	Howard Eisley (4)	Reunion Arena; 14,497	29–18
48	February 3	Golden State	W 101–95	Dirk Nowitzki (23)	Dirk Nowitzki (9)	Howard Eisley (8)	Reunion Arena; 18,187	30–18
49	February 5	@ Atlanta	W 91–81	Eisley, Nowitzki (22)	Dirk Nowitzki (11)	Eisley, Laettner (4)	Philips Arena; 10,771	31–18
50	February 7	@ New York	L 93–96 (2OT)	Michael Finley (21)	Christian Laettner (8)	Michael Finley (5)	Madison Square Garden; 19,763	31–19
All-Star Break
51	February 13	@ San Antonio	L 92–104	Dirk Nowitzki (30)	Dirk Nowitzki (10)	Greg Buckner (3)	Alamodome; 17,705	31–20
52	February 15	Cleveland	W 102–81	Nowitzki, Finley (17)	Dirk Nowitzki (15)	Howard Eisley (5)	Reunion Arena; 14,265	32–20
53	February 17	Washington	W 112–105	Michael Finley (26)	Dirk Nowitzki (10)	Steve Nash (9)	Reunion Arena; 18,187	33–20
54	February 20	L.A. Lakers	L 109–119	Steve Nash (31)	Dirk Nowitzki (8)	Steve Nash (7)	Reunion Arena; 18,287	33–21
55	February 22	Boston	W 98–91	Dirk Nowitzki (23)	Eduardo Nájera (12)	Steve Nash (12)	Reunion Arena; 17,470	34–21
56	February 24	San Antonio	L 104–107	Steve Nash (29)	Dirk Nowitzki (9)	Steve Nash (10)	Reunion Arena; 18,187	34–22
57	February 26	@ L.A. Clippers	W 103–92	Michael Finley (23)	Shawn Bradley (10)	Steve Nash (11)	Staples Center; 13,521	35–22
58	February 27	@ Vancouver	W 116–112	Dirk Nowitzki (31)	Dirk Nowitzki (6)	Michael Finley (11)	General Motors Place; 12,977	36–22

March: 10–4 (home: 7–1; road: 3–3)

Game	Date	Team	Score	High points	High rebounds	High assists	Location Attendance	Record
59	March 3	Houston	W 100–95	Michael Finley (27)	Dirk Nowitzki (13)	Steve Nash (7)	Reunion Arena; 18,187	37–22
60	March 5	@ Orlando	L 81–95	Dirk Nowitzki (22)	Dirk Nowitzki (14)	Steve Nash (6)	TD Waterhouse Centre; 13,636	37–23
61	March 7	@ Miami	W 93–86	Dirk Nowitzki (29)	Howard, Bradley (14)	Steve Nash (7)	American Airlines Arena; 15,864	38–23
62	March 9	Golden State	W 102–73	Dirk Nowitzki (32)	Shawn Bradley (20)	Finley, Nash (7)	Reunion Arena; 18,187	39–23
63	March 11	L.A. Clippers	W 111–93	Dirk Nowitzki (22)	Shawn Bradley (11)	Michael Finley (8)	Reunion Arena; 18,187	40–23
64	March 13	New Jersey	W 122–98	Juwan Howard (27)	Juwan Howard (9)	Steve Nash (11)	Reunion Arena; 15,934	41–23
65	March 15	Minnesota	W 103–83	Michael Finley (22)	Dirk Nowitzki (14)	Steve Nash (7)	Reunion Arena; 17,472	42–23
66	March 17	Phoenix	W 109–99	Dirk Nowitzki (34)	Juwan Howard (14)	Michael Finley (11)	Reunion Arena; 18,187	43–23
67	March 20	Portland	L 88–96	Michael Finley (24)	Dirk Nowitzki (13)	Steve Nash (9)	Reunion Arena; 18,187	43–24
68	March 21	@ Minnesota	L 97–109	Dirk Nowitzki (30)	Shawn Bradley (7)	Howard Eisley (6)	Target Center; 18,101	43–25
69	March 24	Charlotte	W 103–100	Michael Finley (31)	Shawn Bradley (12)	Michael Finley (7)	Reunion Arena; 18,187	44–25
70	March 26	@ Utah	W 98–90	Michael Finley (33)	Dirk Nowitzki (13)	Steve Nash (9)	Delta Center; 19,911	45–25
71	March 28	@ Portland	W 94–84	Juwan Howard (24)	Dirk Nowitzki (14)	Steve Nash (8)	Rose Garden Arena; 20,580	46–25
72	March 30	@ L.A. Lakers	L 89–98	Dirk Nowitzki (24)	Dirk Nowitzki (9)	Howard Eisley (6)	Staples Center; 18,997	46–26

April: 7–3 (home: 3–1; road: 4–2)

Game	Date	Team	Score	High points	High rebounds	High assists	Location Attendance	Record
73	April 1	@ Sacramento	W 119–107	Juwan Howard (32)	Juwan Howard (12)	Steve Nash (12)	ARCO Arena; 17,317	47–26
74	April 3	@ Houston	W 109–97	Michael Finley (27)	Dirk Nowitzki (9)	Steve Nash (9)	Compaq Center; 11,926	48–26
75	April 5	Atlanta	W 108–94	Juwan Howard (20)	Shawn Bradley (15)	Howard Eisley (7)	Reunion Arena; 18,187	49–26
76	April 7	Utah	L 103–116	Juwan Howard (24)	Dirk Nowitzki (9)	Steve Nash (11)	Reunion Arena; 18,187	49–27
77	April 10	@ San Antonio	L 79–91	Michael Finley (25)	Calvin Booth (11)	Steve Nash (5)	Alamodome; 25,682	49–28
78	April 11	@ Phoenix	L 106–111	Michael Finley (34)	Dirk Nowitzki (11)	Steve Nash (5)	America West Arena; 19,023	49–29
79	April 13	Sacramento	W 101–97	Michael Finley (31)	Shawn Bradley (15)	Steve Nash (5)	Reunion Arena; 18,187	50–29
80	April 15	@ Seattle	W 107–99 (OT)	Michael Finley (26)	Dirk Nowitzki (15)	Steve Nash (6)	KeyArena; 15,194	51–29
81	April 16	@ Golden State	W 110–101	Juwan Howard (30)	Shawn Bradley (9)	Nash, Eisley (6)	The Arena in Oakland; 13,393	52–29
82	April 18	Minnesota	W 120–100	Michael Finley (24)	Dirk Nowitzki (8)	Finley, Nash (7)	Reunion Arena; 18,187	53–29

2000–01 schedule

== Playoffs ==
2001 playoff game log
First Round: 3–2 (home: 2–0; road: 1–2)

Game	Date	Team	Score	High points	High rebounds	High assists	Location Attendance	Series
1	April 21	@ Utah	L 86–88	Michael Finley (26)	Dirk Nowitzki (12)	Steve Nash (7)	Delta Center; 19,100	0–1
2	April 24	@ Utah	L 98–109	Michael Finley (32)	Bradley, Finley (8)	Steve Nash (6)	Delta Center; 19,911	0–2
3	April 28	Utah	W 94–91	Dirk Nowitzki (33)	Juwan Howard (11)	Steve Nash (7)	Reunion Arena; 18,187	1–2
4	May 1	Utah	W 107–77	Dirk Nowitzki (33)	Michael Finley (12)	Steve Nash (7)	Reunion Arena; 18,300	2–2
5	May 3	@ Utah	W 84–83	Michael Finley (33)	Juwan Howard (8)	Steve Nash (7)	Delta Center; 19,911	3–2

Conference semifinals: 1–4 (home: 1–1; road: 0–3)

Game	Date	Team	Score	High points	High rebounds	High assists	Location Attendance	Series
1	May 5	@ San Antonio	L 78–94	Michael Finley (17)	Shawn Bradley (12)	Steve Nash (6)	Alamodome; 32,798	0–1
2	May 7	@ San Antonio	L 86–100	Michael Finley (24)	Juwan Howard (11)	Michael Finley (7)	Alamodome; 27,690	0–2
3	May 9	San Antonio	L 90–104	Dirk Nowitzki (15)	Greg Buckner (12)	Michael Finley (5)	Reunion Arena; 18,237	0–3
4	May 12	San Antonio	W 112–108	Dirk Nowitzki (30)	Dirk Nowitzki (9)	Steve Nash (14)	Reunion Arena; 18,187	1–3
5	May 14	@ San Antonio	L 87–105	Dirk Nowitzki (42)	Dirk Nowitzki (18)	Eisley, Finley (4)	Alamodome; 25,853	1–4

2001 schedule

== Player statistics ==
=== Regular season ===
Player	POS	GP	GS	MP	REB	AST	STL	BLK	PTS	MPG	RPG	APG	SPG	BPG	PPG
Michael Finley	SF	82	82	3,443	425	360	118	32	1,765	42.0	5.2	4.4	1.4	.4	21.5
Dirk Nowitzki	PF	82	82	3,125	754	173	79	101	1,784	38.1	9.2	2.1	1.0	1.2	21.8
Howard Eisley	SG	82	40	2,426	197	295	99	12	741	29.6	2.4	3.6	1.2	.1	9.0
Shawn Bradley	C	82	35	2,001	608	38	36	228	579	24.4	7.4	.5	.4	2.8	7.1
Steve Nash	PG	70	70	2,387	223	509	72	5	1,092	34.1	3.2	7.3	1.0	.1	15.6
Christian Laettner^{†}	C	53	35	930	212	67	40	27	398	17.5	4.0	1.3	.8	.5	7.5
Hubert Davis^{†}	PG	51	7	1,261	109	61	29	1	371	24.7	2.1	1.2	.6	.0	7.3
Eduardo Nájera	PF	40	4	431	95	27	13	8	131	10.8	2.4	.7	.3	.2	3.3
Courtney Alexander^{†}	PG	38	6	472	63	21	16	3	160	12.4	1.7	.6	.4	.1	4.2
Greg Buckner	SG	37	9	820	157	49	33	9	229	22.2	4.2	1.3	.9	.2	6.2
Loy Vaught^{†}	PF	37	1	392	123	16	15	5	114	10.6	3.3	.4	.4	.1	3.1
Gary Trent	PF	33	4	319	92	10	13	8	133	9.7	2.8	.3	.4	.2	4.0
Juwan Howard^{†}	PF	27	27	993	193	70	29	16	481	36.8	7.1	2.6	1.1	.6	17.8
Vernon Maxwell^{†}	PG	19	0	285	29	20	9	3	81	15.0	1.5	1.1	.5	.2	4.3
Mark Bryant	PF	18	1	101	21	3	1	2	19	5.6	1.2	.2	.1	.1	1.1
Donnell Harvey	PF	18	0	65	20	2	3	1	22	3.6	1.1	.1	.2	.1	1.2
Calvin Booth^{†}	C	15	7	293	72	19	12	30	112	19.5	4.8	1.3	.8	2.0	7.5
Wang Zhizhi	C	5	0	38	7	0	0	0	24	7.6	1.4	.0	.0	.0	4.8
Bill Curley^{†}	PF	5	0	15	0	0	1	1	3	3.0	.0	.0	.2	.2	.6
Obinna Ekezie^{†}	PF	4	0	8	2	0	0	0	0	2.0	.5	.0	.0	.0	.0

- ^{†} Denotes player spent time with another team in the season. Stats reflect time with the Mavericks only.

=== Playoffs ===
Player	POS	GP	GS	MP	REB	AST	STL	BLK	PTS	MPG	RPG	APG	SPG	BPG	PPG
Michael Finley	SF	10	10	434	53	44	12	2	197	43.4	5.3	4.4	1.2	.2	19.7
Dirk Nowitzki	PF	10	10	399	81	14	11	8	234	39.9	8.1	1.4	1.1	.8	23.4
Juwan Howard	PF	10	10	391	83	14	6	5	134	39.1	8.3	1.4	.6	.5	13.4
Steve Nash	PG	10	10	370	32	64	6	1	136	37.0	3.2	6.4	.6	.1	13.6
Shawn Bradley	C	10	10	256	71	5	4	30	64	25.6	7.1	.5	.4	3.0	6.4
Calvin Booth	C	10	0	137	28	2	7	6	38	13.7	2.8	.2	.7	.6	3.8
Howard Eisley	SG	9	0	194	12	17	5	1	52	21.6	1.3	1.9	.6	.1	5.8
Eduardo Nájera	PF	7	0	44	15	1	1	1	21	6.3	2.1	.1	.1	.1	3.0
Greg Buckner	SG	5	0	75	21	3	5	0	30	15.0	4.2	.6	1.0	.0	6.0
Wang Zhizhi	C	5	0	23	2	1	1	1	10	4.6	.4	.2	.2	.2	2.0
Vernon Maxwell	PG	4	0	43	6	5	0	0	4	10.8	1.5	1.3	.0	.0	1.0
Mark Bryant	PF	4	0	34	6	0	1	0	2	8.5	1.5	.0	.3	.0	.5

== Awards and records ==
- Dirk Nowitzki, All-NBA Third Team
- Michael Finley, NBA All-Star Game

== Transactions ==
=== Trades ===
June 28, 2000	To Dallas Mavericks Courtney Alexander	To Orlando Magic 2001 2nd round pick
June 28, 2000	To Dallas Mavericks Eduardo Nájera; 2001 2nd round pick	To Houston Rockets Dan Langhi
August 16, 2000	To Dallas Mavericks Bill Curley (From Golden State); Dana Barros (From Boston); Howard Eisley (From Utah) To Utah Jazz Donyell Marshall (From Golden State); Bruno Šundov (From Dallas)	To Golden State Warriors Danny Fortson (From Boston); Adam Keefe (From Utah) To Boston Celtics Robert Pack (From Dallas); Hot Rod Williams (From Dallas); 2001 first-round pick (From Utah); Cash (From Dallas)

Player Transactions Reference:
