= Shawn Bradley =

American basketball player (born 1972)

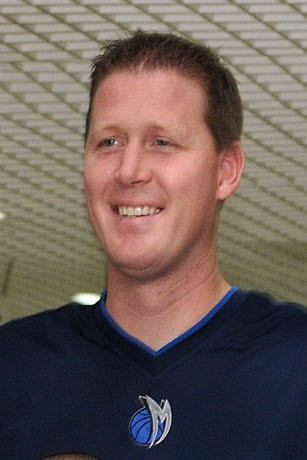
- Bradley in 2008

Personal information
- Born: March 22, 1972 (age 54) Landstuhl, West Germany
- Listed height: 7 ft 6 in (2.29 m)
- Listed weight: 275 lb (125 kg)

Career information
- High school: Emery (Castle Dale, Utah)
- College: BYU (1990–1991)
- NBA draft: 1993: 1st round, 2nd overall pick
- Drafted by: Philadelphia 76ers
- Playing career: 1993–2005
- Position: Center
- Number: 76, 45, 44

Career history
- 1993–1995: Philadelphia 76ers
- 1995–1997: New Jersey Nets
- 1997–2005: Dallas Mavericks

Career highlights
- NBA All-Rookie Second Team (1994); NBA blocks leader (1997); NCAA blocks leader (1991); Second-team All-WAC (1991); WAC Freshman of the Year (1991); Second-team Parade All-American (1990); Third-team Parade All-American (1989); McDonald's All-American Co-MVP (1990); Utah Mr. Basketball (1989)

Career NBA statistics
- Points: 6,752 (8.1 ppg)
- Rebounds: 5,268 (6.3 rpg)
- Blocks: 2,119 (2.5 bpg)
- Stats at NBA.com
- Stats at Basketball Reference

Shawn Paul Bradley (born March 22, 1972) is a German-American former professional basketball player. A center, he was drafted with the second pick in the 1993 NBA draft and played for the Philadelphia 76ers, New Jersey Nets, and Dallas Mavericks between 1993 and 2005. He is one of the tallest players in NBA history at 7 ft 6 in (2.29 m). Nicknamed The Stormin' Mormon, Bradley was named to the 1993-94 NBA All-Rookie Team and was the 1996-97 NBA blocks champion.

Bradley was born in Landstuhl, West Germany, as his family was stationed at the U.S. military base medical facility, and grew up in Castle Dale, Utah. He holds citizenship in both the United States and Germany. In 2021, he suffered a spinal cord injury that left him paralyzed from the shoulders down.

== Early life ==
Shawn Bradley was born on March 22, 1972, in Landstuhl, West Germany, where his father was working at a U.S. military hospital. Bradley came from a tall family: his father Reiner Bradley (1949–2010) was 6 ft 8 in (2.03 m) tall, and his mother Teresa was 6 ft 0 in (1.83 m). Bradley was already 6 ft 8 in (2.03 m) by the end of junior high school (age 13–14), and by the end of his junior year of high school (age 16–17) he had grown to 7 ft 5 in (2.26 m), one inch shy of his adult height of 7 ft 6 in (2.29 m). In 2018, genetic analysis of Bradley's DNA showed that his great height is not the result of any physical or genetic disorders, but simply a natural variation allowing for unusual height.

Bradley was raised on a farm outside the small town of Castle Dale, Utah. He and his siblings were raised in the Church of Jesus Christ of Latter-day Saints (LDS Church). Bradley was a standout basketball, football, and baseball player at Emery High School from 1987 to 1990. He was one of the most successful basketball players in Utah high school history, finishing with career averages of 20.3 points, 11.5 rebounds, and 5.4 blocked shots per game. During his time at the school, Emery compiled a 68–4 record and won two state championships. Bradley was named All-State three times and twice earned the season MVP award. In his senior year, he averaged 25 points, 17 rebounds, and 9 blocks per contest. He was named All-American by several national publications, including Parade Magazine, Street and Smith, USA Today, and others. He turned in a strong performance at the McDonald's All-American Game (12 points, 10 rebounds, and 6 blocks), earning the Most Valuable Player award for the West team. As of 2015, Bradley still holds Utah state records for blocked shots in a single game (18), season (209), and career (605).

== College career and LDS mission ==
Bradley was heavily recruited by many colleges from across the United States, but ultimately decided to play at Brigham Young University (BYU) in Provo, Utah. During his freshman season (1990–91), he started all 34 games for BYU, averaging 14.8 points and 7.7 rebounds per game. But his main contribution to the team was shot-blocking: he led the entire nation in total blocks (177) and average (5.2 per game)—setting an NCAA freshman record in both categories. In one game against Eastern Kentucky (EKU), Bradley blocked 14 shots, tying the NCAA single-game record set by Navy's David Robinson in 1986. In that same game, Bradley also established a new career high by scoring 29 points.

BYU received a bid to the NCAA tournament that season, and Bradley continued his dominant defense. In the first-round game against Virginia, he set a tournament single-game record with 10 blocked shots, leading the Cougars to a 61–48 victory. However, he struggled with foul trouble in the second round, and BYU lost to Arizona, 76–61. Bradley collected several awards and honors for his outstanding freshman season. He was named the Western Athletic Conference (WAC) Freshman of the Year, in addition to All-WAC defensive team and newcomer team honors. He was also named Honorable Mention All-American by the Associated Press (AP)

Bradley took a two-year leave of absence from BYU from 1991 to 1993 to serve as a full-time missionary for the LDS Church. He was assigned to serve in Sydney, Australia. After his mission, Bradley decided to forgo his final three years of NCAA eligibility and declared for the NBA draft.

== Professional career ==
=== Philadelphia 76ers (1993–1995) ===
Bradley entered the 1993 NBA draft as one of the most intriguing and highly debated prospects in the history of the NBA draft. Supporters claimed his tremendous size and surprising athleticism would allow him to dominate the league. Critics argued that he would struggle in the NBA due to his thin build – listed at just 235 pounds (107 kg), he was described by Ric Bucher of The Miami Herald as "rail-thin," and Lee Rose, player personnel director for the Milwaukee Bucks at the time, said, "Size-wise, he'll get pushed around a little bit," – and lack of experience (just one season of college basketball, followed by a two-year hiatus from the sport due to his church mission). Ultimately, he was drafted by the Philadelphia 76ers with the second overall pick, behind Chris Webber and ahead of Penny Hardaway. Given the novelty of a 7-foot-6 center playing for the 76ers, Bradley was issued jersey number 76.

Philadelphia's management saw Bradley as a major project with huge long-term potential. The team acquired legendary big man Moses Malone to serve as a mentor for Bradley, hoping to develop his skills in the low post. Also, the franchise hired strength and conditioning consultant Pat Croce and registered dietitian Jeanie Subach, as well as assistant coach Jeff Ruland, to add bulk to Bradley's skinny frame. His rookie season (1993–94) produced mixed results. In his first game, Bradley totaled just 6 points and 5 rebounds, but he did manage to block 8 shots in 25 minutes.

For much of his career, Bradley was inconsistent in scoring and rebounding, but he always excelled at blocking shots. He averaged 10.3 points, 6.2 rebounds, and 3.0 blocks per game in his first season – good enough to earn NBA All-Rookie Second Team honors. He shot 40.9 percent from the floor and constantly struggled with turnovers and foul trouble. He suffered a season-ending injury in February of that year, dislocating his kneecap in a collision with Portland's Harvey Grant.

Bradley returned to full strength in his second season, playing in all 82 games for the 76ers. His scoring actually declined slightly (9.5 points per game), but his rebounding and shot-blocking increased. He racked up 274 rejections, setting a franchise record for most blocks in a single season. Bradley gave Philly fans a glimpse of his potential in a game against the Los Angeles Clippers in November, posting career highs of 28 points and 22 rebounds in a 97–83 victory. He also tied a career high with 9 blocked shots, and was credited with 9 additional "intimidations" as the Clippers were held to their lowest-ever point total against the 76ers. He finished the season in strong fashion, posting 13 double-doubles in his last 17 games.

=== New Jersey Nets (1995–1997) ===
Despite these highlights, Bradley continued to baffle and frustrate Philadelphia with his inconsistent play. Just 12 games into his third season (1995–96), the 76ers traded Bradley to the New Jersey Nets for Derrick Coleman. He played the final 67 games of the year with the Nets, and tantalized Nets fans with some strong play in the second half of the season. In February, he dominated a match-up against fellow giant Gheorghe Mureșan, leading the Nets to a 99–81 victory against the Washington Bullets. Bradley scored a season-high 27 points over the 7-foot-7 Mureşan, and also added 9 rebounds and 4 blocked shots.

Bradley lifted his game to new levels in March 1996. He posted a career-high 32 points and added 15 rebounds against Dallas early in the month, and set another career high a week later with 10 blocked shots against the Phoenix Suns. He recorded his first career triple-double in the very next game, tallying 19 points, 17 rebounds, and a career-best 11 blocked shots in another match-up against Mureşan and the Bullets. In April, Bradley posted back-to-back triple-doubles (against Boston and Toronto); in the process, he became the first player in NBA history to record consecutive games of double-figure blocked shots twice in a single season. His season averages for 1995–96 were 11.9 points, 8.1 rebounds, and 3.7 blocks per game—all career highs.

The Nets began the 1996–97 season under new management: John Calipari was named head coach in the off-season, and John Nash replaced Willis Reed as general manager. Reed had been a big believer in Bradley, but Calipari and Nash weren't nearly as excited about the 7-foot-6 enigma. In an effort to save some cash against the salary cap, the Nets traded their big center (and his big contract) to the Dallas Mavericks in a blockbuster mid-season deal that involved nine players.

=== Dallas Mavericks (1997–2005) ===
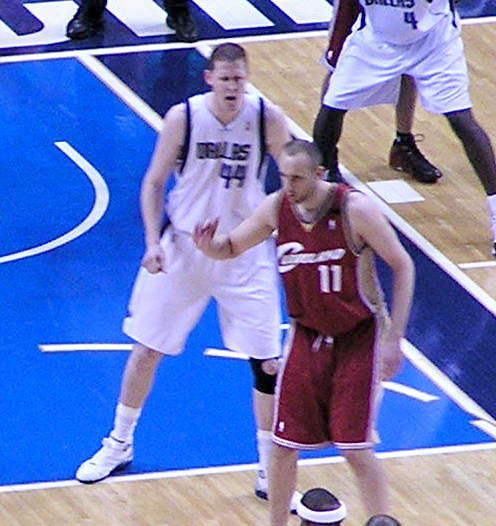
Bradley (left) with the Mavericks in 2005

Bradley embraced yet another "fresh start" with a new franchise. With increased playing time in Dallas, Bradley posted some of the best numbers of his career. In a game against the Clippers, he tied his career high by scoring 32 points—the most ever by a center in the history of the Mavericks franchise. He also added a season-high 16 rebounds in that same contest. He finished the year with averages of 13.2 points and 8.4 rebounds per game—breaking career highs set during the previous season. But most importantly, Bradley provided strong defense in the paint that Dallas had been lacking before his arrival. In fact, Bradley finished the year as the top shot-blocker in the entire league, averaging 3.4 swats per contest. It was the first time any Mavericks player had ever led the NBA in any statistical category.

And yet, Bradley continued to be plagued by the maddening inconsistency that defined his entire professional career. During the 1997–98 season, Dallas coach Jim Cleamons experimented by bringing Bradley off the bench in several games (instead of his usual role as starter). In one particular game, it paid off in a major way: Bradley totaled 22 points, 22 rebounds, and a career-high 13 blocked shots in an April contest against the Trail Blazers. Bradley became the fifth NBA player to record at least 20 points, 20 rebounds, and 10 blocks in a single game, and the first to do so off the bench. The previous players to record a 20–20–10 game with points, rebounds, and blocks were Kareem Abdul-Jabbar, Elvin Hayes, Hakeem Olajuwon, and Shaquille O'Neal. Bradley finished the year with a team-record 214 blocked shots; his average of 3.3 per game ranked third in the NBA.

Bradley played 7 more seasons in the league, remaining with the Mavericks until his retirement in 2005. Over that span, his playing time slowly declined, mainly due to some injuries and constant juggling of the team's lineups and rotations by coach Don Nelson. In particular, Bradley's offensive role became very limited, but he remained an imposing defensive presence. In fact, in the 2000–01 season, he broke his own team record by blocking 228 shots for Dallas—the highest total in the NBA that year. The Mavericks emerged as a perennial playoff contender, mostly due to the rise of star players such as Dirk Nowitzki and Steve Nash, but Bradley's defense made a significant contribution. He finished his career with averages of 8.1 points, 6.3 rebounds, and 2.5 blocks in 23.5 minutes of action per game.

Bradley's Mavericks memorabilia on display at the BYU Legacy Hall

== National team career ==
Bradley has competed internationally for Germany; he and Dallas teammate Dirk Nowitzki were members of the German national basketball team that finished in fourth place at the EuroBasket 2001 in Turkey. In order to participate in this tournament, Bradley made use of his birth by a German mother to obtain German citizenship.

== Post-basketball career ==
After his retirement as a player, Bradley became involved with West Ridge Academy, a coeducational private school for at-risk youths in West Jordan, Utah. Bradley's role with the school involves some of the functions of a vice principal, counselor, and coach. Describing Bradley, school executive director Ken Allen said, "Shawn has a great presence—due to his size—and has immediate credibility with the kids. His instant credibility when he's talking to kids makes him an incredible mentor. He is a great example of someone who has worked hard and been very successful. Being so tall wasn't always easy for him. He knows about being the 'odd kid' and dealing with that."

On March 19, 2010, Bradley filed papers to run as a Republican against incumbent Democratic Representative Tim Cosgrove for the 44th District seat in the Utah House of Representatives. On November 2, 2010, Bradley lost the election to Cosgrove, earning 46.49% of the vote against Cosgrove's 51.13%.

== Personal life ==
Bradley has participated in many charitable endeavors. In the 2000–01 season he donated $25 for each blocked shot to Bryan's House, a managed facility for children affected by HIV and AIDS. He is a national spokesman for the Children's Miracle Network Hospitals. Bradley has also participated in the "Basketball Without Borders" program with other NBA players like Dikembe Mutombo, DeSagana Diop and Malik Rose and found his experiences with children in Africa uplifting. He has also participated in treating leprosy colonies in India through the Rising Star Outreach.

While in the NBA, Bradley was fined $10,000 for refusing to attend a mandatory meeting which was held in a strip club, which he did not attend due to his religious beliefs.

Bradley married Annette Evertson in 1993, shortly after he signed with the Philadelphia 76ers. They had six children and later divorced, with Bradley commenting in 2022 how he was largely estranged from them.

In 2017, Bradley married Carrie Cannon, and in 2019 adopted her three children.

=== Spinal cord injury ===
On January 20, 2021, Bradley was struck from behind by a motorist while riding his bicycle near his home in St. George, Utah. Bradley was in the process of passing a car parked on the shoulder of the road when he drifted in front of a minivan who bumped him from behind; the driver of that vehicle was not charged with a crime. The incident resulted in a traumatic spinal cord injury in his neck that left him paralyzed. He has limited mobility in his upper body, and more total paralysis in his lower body.

In a 2022 interview with Sports Illustrated, Bradley stated he and his family intend to move into a more wheelchair-friendly home in Dallas, Texas, while he continues his rehabilitation. Bradley also described his height as a "hindrance" to his recovery, as quadriplegia at his height has no medical precedent.

== TV and movie appearances ==
Bradley had a role in the film Space Jam in 1996, depicted as one of the NBA stars who lose their talent alongside Muggsy Bogues, Larry Johnson, Charles Barkley, and Patrick Ewing. He also appeared as himself in an episode of Walker, Texas Ranger, and had a cameo appearance as an auto mechanic in The Singles Ward movie. In 2011, he appeared in a music video tribute to Jimmer Fredette, along with former BYU football star Chad Lewis and legendary coach LaVell Edwards. He has also appeared in an episode of Studio C.

Bradley was featured in the ESPN 30 for 30 short documentary "Posterized" given his propensity "for being on the wrong end of a lot of great dunks." This includes the legendary Tracy McGrady posterizing Bradley on April 25, 2005 in the 2nd game of the Western Conference playoffs.

== Career statistics ==
Legend
GP	Games played	GS	Games started	MPG	Minutes per game
FG%	Field goal percentage	3P%	3-point field goal percentage	FT%	Free throw percentage
RPG	Rebounds per game	APG	Assists per game	SPG	Steals per game
BPG	Blocks per game	PPG	Points per game	**Bold**	Career high
*	Led the league

=== NBA ===
==== Regular season ====
Year	Team	GP	GS	MPG	FG%	3P%	FT%	RPG	APG	SPG	BPG	PPG
1993–94	Philadelphia	49	45	28.3	.409	.000	.607	6.2	**2.0**	**0.9**	3.0	10.3
1994–95	Philadelphia	**82***	**59**	28.8	.455	.000	.638	8.0	0.6	0.7	3.3	9.5
1995–96	Philadelphia	12	11	27.8	.443	.000	.760	**8.8**	0.7	0.7	3.2	8.8
1995–96	New Jersey	67	57	29.8	.443	.250	.679	7.9	0.8	0.6	3.7	12.5
1996–97	New Jersey	40	38	30.7	.436	.000	.664	8.1	0.5	0.6	**4.0***	12.0
1996–97	Dallas	33	32	**32.1**	.461	.000	.642	8.7	1.0	0.5	2.7	**14.6**
1997–98	Dallas	64	46	28.5	.422	**.333**	.722	8.1	0.9	0.8	3.3	11.4
1998–99	Dallas	49	33	26.4	.480	.000	.748	8.0	0.8	0.7	3.2	8.6
1999–00	Dallas	77	54	24.7	.479	.200	.765	6.5	0.8	**0.9**	2.5	8.4
2000–01	Dallas	**82**	35	24.4	.490	.167	.787	7.4	0.5	0.4	2.8	7.1
2001–02	Dallas	53	16	14.3	.479	.000	**.922**	3.3	0.4	0.5	1.2	4.1
2002–03	Dallas	81	39	21.4	**.536**	.000	.806	5.9	0.7	0.8	2.1	6.7
2003–04	Dallas	66	5	11.7	.473	.000	.837	2.6	0.3	0.5	1.1	3.3
2004–05	Dallas	77	14	11.5	.452	.000	.683	2.8	0.2	0.3	0.8	2.7
Career		832	484	23.5	.457	.103	.716	6.3	0.7	0.6	2.5	8.1

==== Playoffs ====
Year	Team	GP	GS	MPG	FG%	3P%	FT%	RPG	APG	SPG	BPG	PPG
2000–01	Dallas	10	**10**	**25.6**	**.529**	.000	**.769**	**7.1**	**0.5**	**0.4**	**3.9**	**6.4**
2001–02	Dallas	7	0	3.6	.500	.000	.000	0.7	0.0	0.0	0.1	0.9
2002–03	Dallas	**17**	7	14.5	.400	.000	.750	3.8	0.3	0.2	0.8	2.9
2003–04	Dallas	2	0	1.5	.000	.000	.000	0.0	0.0	0.0	0.0	0.0
2004–05	Dallas	7	0	3.9	.667	.000	.500	0.9	0.0	0.0	0.3	1.3
Career		43	17	13.0	.478	.000	.741	3.4	0.2	0.2	1.1	3.0

=== College ===
*	Led NCAA Division I

Year	Team	GP	GS	MPG	FG%	3P%	FT%	RPG	APG	SPG	BPG	PPG
1990–91	BYU	34	34	28.9	.518	1.000	.692	7.7	1.2	.7	5.2*	14.8

== See also ==
- List of NBA career blocks leaders
- List of NBA annual blocks leaders
- List of NBA single-game blocks leaders
- List of tallest players in NBA history
- List of NCAA Division I men's basketball players with 13 or more blocks in a game
