= West Ridge Academy =

Defunct therapeutic boarding school in West Jordan, Utah, United States

Coordinates: 40.584239°N 112.019367°W

Location
- 5500 W Bagley Park Rd; West Jordan, Utah, United States; West Jordan, Utah

Information
- Former name: Utah Boys Ranch
- School type: Private
- Denomination: Non Denominational
- Closed: February 21, 2025
- NCES District ID: 21
- NCES School ID: A1904497
- Director: Daniel Mata M.D.
- Teaching staff: 10.0(on an FTE basis)
- Age range: 9 – 18
- Student to teacher ratio: 5.3
- Hours in school day: 6.5
- Colors: Blue, White, Yellow
- Sports: Basketball, Baseball, Soccer
- Mascot: Eagles
- Website: http://westridgeacademy.org/

West Ridge Academy (known as the Utah Boys Ranch until 2005), was a youth residential treatment center based in West Jordan, Utah, USA. It provided clinical services, education, and other programs for teens, both girls and boys, that were identified as at-risk. Until 2005, the Utah Boys Ranch was male-only. In early 2005, it opened new, separate facilities for girls and changed its name to West Ridge Academy. It was a non-profit 501(c)(3) corporation under the name Children and Youth Services, Inc. The academy states that it provides "quality clinical services, education, and experiences which promote spiritual awareness, personal accountability and change of heart." The facility has received criticism for past abusive practices toward residents, including facing lawsuits in 2008, 2010, and 2012 by former students. In 2016, the application to transition West Ridge Academy into a charter school, named Eagle Summit Academy, was approved by the Utah Board of Education after including caveats to keep public and private funding separate in the school's budgets and to ensure the safety of the new charter school's students.

West Ridge also provided a day program called Sunshine Solutions for underprivileged local kids, age five and up which provides "summer activities, positive mentors and emotional growth to help them learn how to make good decisions". The school was Christian but non-denominational, with the majority of students belonging to the Church of Jesus Christ of Latter-day Saints (LDS Church).

In February 2025, West Ridge announced its closure after 61 years.

== Leadership and governance ==
The board of directors had featured prominent Utah residents including Shawn Bradley, BYU religion instructor Sally Wyne, and LaVar Christensen. Past board members included Utah Senator Delpha Baird, West Jordan city Judge Ronald Kunz, and police chief Ken McGuire. Stan and Mary Ellen Smoot, and Richard and Linda J. Eyre serve on an advisory board. A former executive director was Kenneth R. Allen, who was also director of Proficio Management, a management company owned by the academy. Since their founding, over 25,000 teens have attended the institution. West Ridge was licensed by the Utah Department of Human Services. The license of West Ridge Academy was reviewed annually and the organization receives periodic visits from a licensing specialist to monitor and provide technical assistance and to insure compliance with Core and Categorical Rules of Treatment.

== History ==
Utah Boys Ranch navigation sign prior to renaming of the facility to West Ridge Academy in 2005

The Utah Boys Ranch was founded by William L. Hutchinson, Lowell L. Bennion and a group of primarily Salt Lake County educators in 1964. The group originally purchased five acres on which to build the Ranch. Bennion had twice during this initial period requested funding from LDS Church to support the Ranch, but in both instances the LDS Church refused. Soon after the second request, David O. McKay, then president of the LDS Church, donated $10,000 to support the Utah Boys Ranch. Later, leadership changed hands and Utah State Senator Chris Buttars became the executive director and remained so for more than fifteen years before retiring amid controversy.

In late 2015, an application was submitted Utah's Charter School Board. The Charter School Board approved the application and transition in January 2016, but the state's Board of Education reversed the decision the following month, denying the application without prejudice, amid allegations of abuse and financial insolvency. The Board of Education revisited the application in March 2016 following the preparation of a 60-page report prepared by the State's Office of Education providing details on the issues raised the previous month. After including caveats to keep public and private funding separate in the school's budgets and to ensure the safety of the new charter school's students, the Board of Education approved the application.

In early 2025, the school board announced their dissolution and the closure of the institution after 61 years. On February 21, 2025, the academy closed.

== Sports program ==
West Ridge Academy offered a comprehensive sports program, believing it to be a positive treatment for some students because it offers a chance to form a bond with their teammates. The school had been an official member of the 1A Utah High School Activities Association since 2002 with the boys' varsity athletics. It fields boys' high school teams in basketball, baseball and soccer. In 2006 West Ridge Academy started a girls' athletics program and has a girls' basketball team.

== Litigation and controversy ==
West Ridge has been the subject of several lawsuits, including personal injury lawsuits in 2008 and 2010. On January 2, 2009, a past student of the academy published an article alleging abuses and controversial practices at the ranch. On January 9, 2009, Salt Lake City radio station KRCL invited Buttars, current West Ridge staff, and the student to the talk show RadioActive! to discuss the article, but Buttars and West Ridge staff declined the invitation. On October 21, 2010, the student sued West Ridge Academy in California District court, alleging negligence, physical abuse, and sexual abuse.

Allegations of abuse from former students were one of the main reasons Utah's Board of Education initially denied the application for West Ridge Academy to become a charter school called Eagle Summit Academy. In response to the allegations, the State Office of Education prepared a 60-page report providing more details for the Board on the issues raised. The report identified several lawsuits against West Ridge Academy, several of which were settled out of court, but could not find any corroborating evidence to support the allegations of abuse. The report was also critical of school's proposed financial structure.

In 2020, West Ridge Academy was under investigation after a teen girl from Bermuda died by suicide there.

In 2021, an employee was charged with child abuse after breaking a child's wrist who was allegedly verbally acting out in class and being defiant.

== Relationship with LDS Church ==
The academy was nondenominational and open to all regardless of religious affiliation, but has had a number of connections with the LDS Church throughout the academy's history. The academy was established in 1964 with the assistance of a $10,000 donation from David O. McKay, then president of the LDS Church. There are several elderly couples called as LDS service missionaries at the academy. The service missionaries provide spiritual tutoring but do not proselytize, using the Book of Mormon and the Bible with LDS teens and only the Bible when interacting with teens of other faiths at the academy. Ken Allen, the academy's past director, has stated that the missionaries' role is pivotal in the reformation of the boys and girls who attend West Ridge Academy. Prior to 2005, while operating under the name, Utah Boys Ranch, the logo of the facility included the phrase, "Do What is Right, Let the Consequence Follow", taken from an LDS hymn. H. David Burton, when he was the Presiding Bishop of the LDS Church, said that the LDS Church "has been and continues to be a long-time supporter" of West Ridge Academy.
