= George Osmond (politician) =

American politician

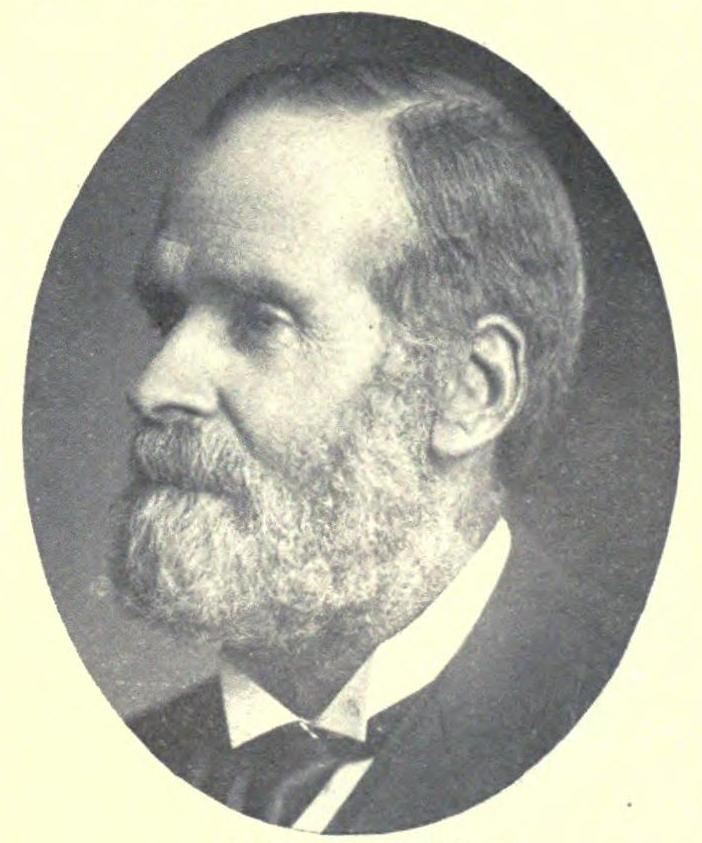
- Born: May 23, 1836; Hackney, London, England
- Died: March 25, 1913 (aged 76); Afton, Wyoming, USA
- Occupations: Judge, senator
- Known for: The Church of Jesus Christ of Latter-day Saints; Great-grandfather to The Osmonds
- Children: 17
- Relatives: George Osmond (grandson); Virl Osmond (great-grandson); Tom Osmond (great-grandson); Alan Osmond (great-grandson); Wayne Osmond (great-grandson); Merrill Osmond (great-grandson); Jay Osmond (great-grandson); Donny Osmond (great-grandson); Marie Osmond (great-granddaughter); Jimmy Osmond (great-grandson)

George Osmond (May 23, 1836 – March 25, 1913) was a leader in The Church of Jesus Christ of Latter-day Saints, a judge and state senator in Wyoming, and the paternal great-grandfather of The Osmonds.

== Biography ==
In 1850, he became a shipbuilder's apprentice in Woolwich. It was from fellow apprentices that he first heard of the LDS Church and was baptized on November 27, 1850. In 1854, he sailed on the Clara Wheeler to New Orleans, then onto St. Louis, where he worked for James Eads. In 1855, he married Oxfordshire native Mary Georgina Huckvale, then left for the Utah Territory, first settling in Bountiful, then in Willard. The couple had 9 children. The family ultimately settled in Bloomington, Idaho in 1864, where Osmond died in 1913.

He served as bishop in Bloomington for seven years, and then as a counselor to William Budge in the presidency of the Bear Lake Stake. From 1884 to 1886, Osmond served as a Mormon missionary in England during which time he was assistant editor of the Millennial Star. From 1890 to 1892, he was again on a mission to the British Isles, during which he served first as president of the Scottish District and then as president of the London District. Shortly after returning to the United States in 1892, he was called as president of the newly organized Star Valley Stake.

At various times, Osmond served as a probate judge and a justice of the peace. From 1899 to 1905, he served two terms as a member of the Wyoming State Senate as a Republican from Uinta County, Wyoming.

As did the majority of Mormon men, Osmond practiced polygamy.

=== Family ===
On September 8, 1881, he married 19-year-old Christina Lovinia Amelia Jacobsen while he was still married to Mary; the couple had 6 children. Their son, Rulon, was the father of George Virl Osmond, patriarch of the Osmonds of pop music fame. Aaron Osmond followed his great-great-grandfather and became a politician.

The Osmond family established farms in Utah, including a dairy farm owned by Rulon's son Rulon Jr. Travis Osmond, George's great-great-grandson through Rulon, George Virl and Merrill, has carried on the family's agricultural tradition.

Mary was buried with Osmond when she died in 1922. Christina died in 1946 and was buried in Wyoming.

== Sources ==
- Andrew Jenson. Latter-day Saints Biographical Encyclopedia. Vol. 1, p. 348.
