= Lincoln Fillmore =

American politician

Member of the Utah Senate
- Incumbent
- Assumed office January 5, 2016
- Preceded by: Aaron Osmond
- Constituency: 10th district (2016–2023); 17th district (2023–present)

Personal details
- Born: Salt Lake County, Utah, U.S.
- Party: Republican Party
- Education: University of Utah
- Occupation: Business owner

Lincoln Fillmore is a Republican senator for Utah State Senate District 17. Prior to redistricting, he represented Senate District 10. He was appointed by Governor Gary Herbert to fill a vacant seat caused by the resignation of Aaron Osmond.

Prior to his nomination to the Utah Senate in 2016, Fillmore served the Republican Party as a county and state delegate, as well as a precinct, legislative, and regional chair.

In addition to being a small-business owner, Fillmore is a baseball fan. He was a minor-league baseball announcer for nine years.

== Early life, education, and career ==
Lincoln was born in Salt Lake County and lived there until his teenage years when his family moved to the San Francisco Bay Area. While living in California as a teenager, he wrote a conservative news column for his town's newspaper, the Foster City Progress. At the age of 20, Lincoln moved back to Utah. There, he earned a degree from the University of Utah in Mass Communications. He has spent his professional career as an educator and an entrepreneur.

== Political career ==
Fillmore serves as the senator of district 17 in Utah. His legislative efforts focus on education, reducing taxes and regulation, and balanced spending.

Fillmore currently chairs the Legislative Process Committee, the Public Education Appropriations Subcommittee, and the Education Confirmation Committee, and is the vice chair of the Senate Rules Committee.

2024 committee assignments

- Education Interim Committee
- Ethnic Studies Commission
- Legislative Process Committee
- Natural Resources, Agriculture, and Environmental Quality Appropriations Subcommittee
- Public Education Appropriations Subcommittee
- Retirement and Independent Entities Interim Committee
- Revenue and Taxation Interim Committee
- Senate Education Committee
- Senate Education Confirmation Committee
- Senate Retirement and Independent Entities Confirmation Committee
- Senate Revenue and Taxation Committee
- Senate Revenue and Taxation Confirmation Committee
- Senate Rules Committee
- Senate Rules Interim Committee

=== Elections ===
Utah State Senate District 17 general election, 2024
Party	Candidate	Votes	%
Republican	Lincoln Fillmore	34,072	63.9%
Unaffiliated	Pamela Bloom	19,259	36.1%
Total votes		53,331	100%

Utah State Senate District 10 general election, 2020
Party	Candidate	Votes	%
Republican	Lincoln Fillmore	31,762	65.2%
Democratic	Dan McClellan	23,586	34.8%
Total votes		45,204	100%

Utah State Senate District 10 general election, 2016
Party	Candidate	Votes	%
Republican	Lincoln Fillmore	31,762	70.26%
Democratic	Dan Paget	13,442	29.74%
Total votes		45,204	100%

== Legislation ==
2020

- S.B. 110 Electronic Driver License Requirements
- S.B. 104 Local Education Levy State Guarantee Amendments
- S.B. 64 Special District Communications Amendments

2022

- S.B. 191 Regulatory Sandbox in Education
- S.B. 62 Special Needs Opportunity Scholarship Program Amendments

2021

- S.B. 115 Retirement System Transparency Requirements
- S.B. 86 Amendment to the Price Controls During Emergencies Act

2023

- S.B. 77 Education Scholarship Amendments
- S.B. 85 License Plate Requirement Amendments
- S.B. 174 Local Land Use and Development Revisions
- S.B. 55 Public School Instructional Material Requirements

2024

- S.B. 137 Teacher Empowerment
- S.B. 168 Affordable Building Amendments
- S.B. 173 Market Informed Compensation for Teachers
- S.B. 64 Effective Teachers in High Poverty Schools Incentive Program Amendments
