= L. Alma Mansell =

American politician

Member of the Utah State Senate
- In office 1994 – July 19, 2006

Personal details
- Born: Lloyd Alma Mansell; January 23, 1944 (age 82) Midvale, Utah, U.S.
- Party: Republican
- Spouse: Margurite
- Occupation: real estate broker

Lloyd Alma "Al" Mansell (born January 23, 1944) is an American former politician in the state of Utah. He served in the Utah State Senate as a Republican from the 10th district from 1995 to 2001. He also served stints as President of the Utah Senate, as well as Assistant Majority Leader.

He was born in Midvale, Utah and attended the University of Utah and worked as a real estate broker.
