= Aaron Osmond =

American politician (born 1969)

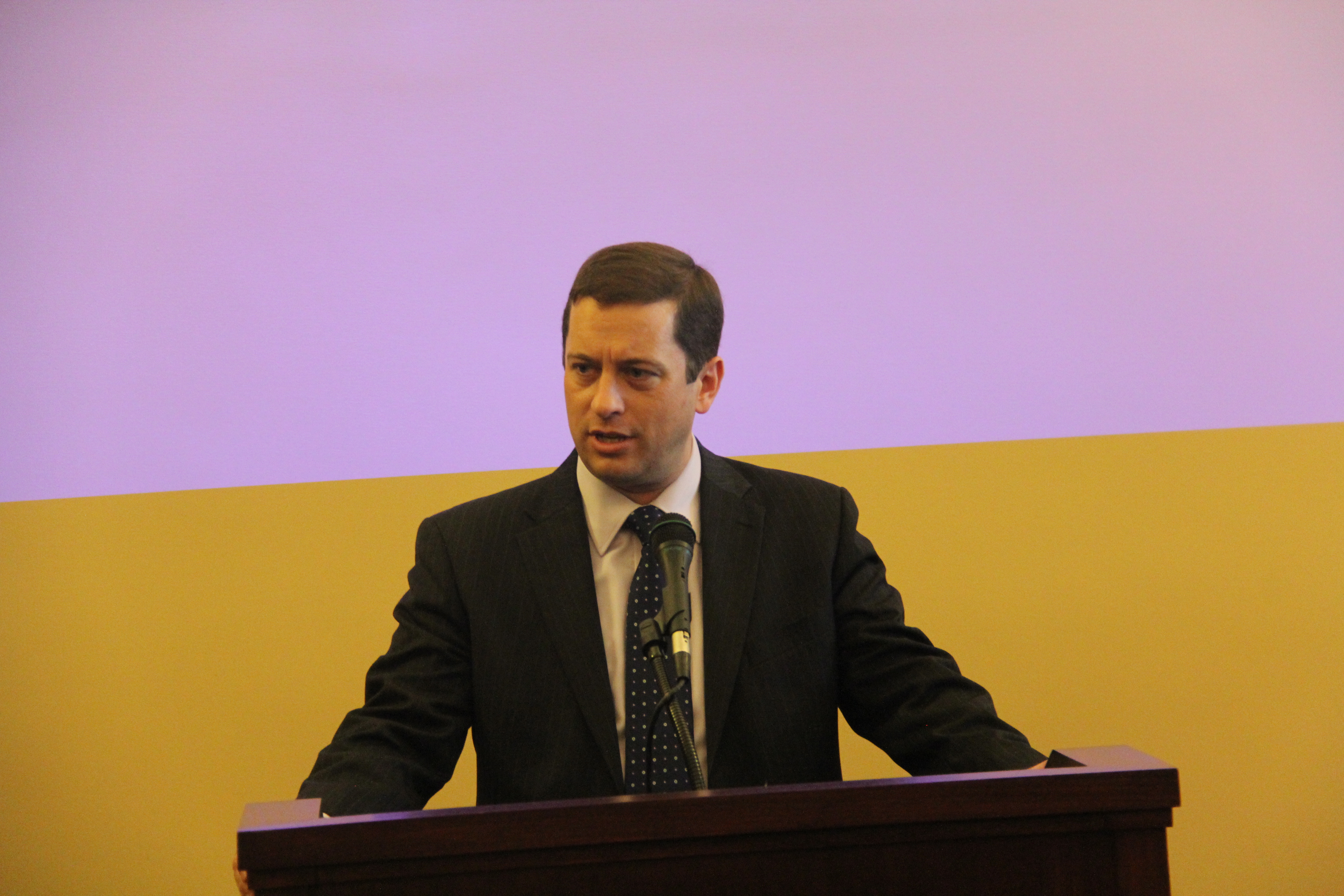
- Aaron Osmond

Member of the Utah Senate from the 10 district
- In office March 2011 – January 2016
- Preceded by: Chris Buttars
- Succeeded by: Lincoln Fillmore

Personal details
- Born: Aaron Virl Osmond; October 31, 1969 (age 56) Provo, Utah
- Party: Republican
- Spouse: Nancy Felt
- Children: 5
- Parent: Virl Osmond (father)
- Relatives: George Osmond (grandfather); Olive Osmond (grandmother); Tom Osmond (uncle); Alan Osmond (uncle); Wayne Osmond (uncle); Merrill Osmond (uncle); Jay Osmond (uncle); Donny Osmond (uncle); Marie Osmond (aunt); Jimmy Osmond (uncle)
- Education: University of Phoenix Brigham Young University
- Profession: Workforce Transformation Specialist, Worldwide Public Sector, Amazon Web Services
- Website: http://www.aaronosmond.com

Aaron Virl Osmond (born October 31, 1969) is a former Republican member of the Utah Senate, representing the 10th district. He resigned from office December 5, 2015.

== Early life, education, and career ==
Aaron Osmond was born and raised in Provo, Utah; he is the son of George Virl Osmond Jr., the oldest member of the Osmond Brothers, whose participation in the family's musical business was limited due to hearing impairment. Aaron served a two-year mission for the Church of Jesus Christ of Latter-day Saints (LDS Church) in Rome, Italy. He received a B.S. in business management from the University of Phoenix.

While taking his degree, he also worked for WordPerfect and Novell for twelve years. In 2003 he joined Microsoft, where he managed a $200 million educational product line. In 2007, he started investing in real estate. During that time he served as the CEO of Real Estate Investor Education, LLC for 3 years. In April 2012, he assumed responsibility as VP of North America for Certiport, an IT Education Testing Company. Since 2014, he has been vice president of global sales, initially remaining with Certiport, before shifting in 2018 to work directly for its parent company, Pearson Clinical Assessments.

Osmond volunteers as vice chair on the board of trustees for the Utah System of Technology Colleges. He also sits as a board member on the Employability to Careers Program Board and on the Sacred Innocence Foundation.

Aaron and his wife Nancy are the parents of 5 children. Nancy is a Pediatric Registered Nurse by profession. Their family has lived in South Jordan since 2006.

== Political career ==
In 2011, Osmond was elected as state senator for Utah's 10th district, formerly represented by Chris Buttars. In 2013, he attracted national attention when he called for an end to compulsory education. Senator Osmond has been affiliated with South Jordan Chamber of Commerce as the Vice Chair and the Provo City Planning Commission/Board of Adjustments. In 2014, Osmond served on the Higher Education Appropriations Subcommittee, Public Education Appropriations Subcommittee, the Chair of the Senate Economic Development and Workforce Services Committee, and the Senate Education Committee. In 2015, Osmond stepped down from the Senate after considering the top post at the Utah College of Applied Technology.

== Pivotal Bills/ In the News ==
=== 2012 ===
==== SB64 – Public Education Employment Reform ====
Senator Osmond wasted no time trying to make an impact on longstanding state laws. One notable bill from his freshman year as a senator was SB64, which targeted public education employment. The bill was introduced February 8, 2012, and the very next day, Osmond posted an introduction to the bill online, which stated some of the goals he was trying to achieve with the legislation.

The initial reaction to the bill was mixed, with particularly strong opponents among those in the field of public education. Osmond knew some changes needed to take place, so he did not want to back down, but he also wanted to ensure the changes he made would be informed and reflective of the problems actually facing the state. To achieve this goal, he put the bill on hold, brought a number of interested parties to the table, and took into account a number of varying views. Additional changes were made to the bill to the point that it received overwhelming support from both houses (it passed the House 73-1 and the Senate 26-2) and additional endorsements by parents, teachers, and other interested parties. The Utah Education Association (UEA) even published a piece discussing the good done by the bill. The UEA is careful to note the work Osmond put in to ensure he heard and applied input from voices on all sides of the issue.

The UEA article points out a number of changes Osmond made after soliciting his feedback. Where the initial bill made all educators at-will employees and based salary on performance evaluations, the final legislation removed both of these changes. Some voices in the Senate wanted these stronger provisions reinstated, but Osmond decided it was better to take small steps on these issues and involve educators, rather than making sweeping changes without their input.

The bill itself adjusts provisions regarding the status and termination of school district employees and educator evaluations. It directs the state board of education to make rules requiring annual performance evaluations for school district employees (with a few exceptions). The data on those educator ratings are to be publicly reported, and procedures are set forth for non-renewal or termination of a career employee’s contract based on unsatisfactory performance. Finally, the salaries of certain administrative positions are made contingent upon these evaluations.

This bill was not only an early satisfaction in Osmond’s legislative career, but it also gave him experience dealing with difficult topics, enforced the value of soliciting multiple perspectives, and enlarged his perspective on issues of public education. Many of the skills Osmond used throughout his time with the senate came from things he learned with this bill. After gleaning insight from interested parties, he wrote a piece called “Lessons Learned and Next Steps” in which he discusses what he discovered in the course of working with so many active citizens of the state.

=== 2013 ===
==== SB131 – Assault Amendments ====
In his sophomore year, Osmond carried a heavier legislative load. Notable in the 2013 general session was a bill he ran that amended the state definition of assault, providing additional offenses (second and third degree assault charges) for assaulting a peace officer or military service member in uniform.

==== An End to Compulsory Education? ====
In 2013, Osmond attracted national attention when he wrote a senate blog suggesting an end to compulsory education. He argued that requiring education had unintended negative consequences in that it allowed parents to disengage from their children’s education in ways that were detrimental.

"Some parents completely disengage themselves from their obligation to oversee and ensure the successful education of their children. Some parents act as if the responsibility to educate, and even care for their child, is primarily the responsibility of the public school system. As a result, our teachers and schools have been forced to become surrogate parents, expected to do everything from behavioral counseling, to providing adequate nutrition, to teaching sex education, as well as ensuring full college and career readiness. Unfortunately, in this system, teachers rarely receive meaningful support or engagement from parents and occasionally face retaliation when they attempt to hold a child accountable for bad behavior or poor academic performance."

While the call for ending compulsory education is what attracted the most attention, Osmond goes on to suggest other amendments to our school systems in line with his basic beliefs that parents should be more involved. Among these other changes, Osmond suggested increased and adequate state funding for schools, shifting more responsibility for education to local school boards, encouraging more people to attend and participate in school board meetings, and eliminating the statewide requirement of 990 educational hours each year (he suggested the decision of how many hours should rest with local school districts).

Osmond’s ideas received widespread criticism from some, while others suggested his radical changes did not go far enough. In future years, the core of these initial sentiments went on to shape much of Osmond’s legislative career. He never pressed the issue of compulsory education after that point, but championed legislation to place more educational responsibility on parents.

=== 2014 ===
==== SB39 – Home School Amendments ====
Osmond’s SB39 in 2014 provided greater freedom for homeschool students and their parents to pursue education with more freedom than had been previously allowed by the state. The bill modified procedures for getting a student excused from public school and eliminated mandatory instructional requirements for homeschool students. This allowed the homeschool students to focus on their education rather than meeting a mandated number of hours or topics as decided by the state. Many homeschool parents saw this as a victory that allowed them the freedom to emphasize and pace their children’s education in a way best suited for them. Osmond clarified that he believed parents should be primarily responsible for their children’s education, with the state serving in a secondary position. The bill sparked some concern that some homeschool parents would use this freedom as an excuse to not educate their children, or to do so inadequately. The bill addressed some of these concerns by requiring homeschool students to still qualify for college entrance exams or workforce readiness metrics. Additionally, if a homeschool student returns to public school, SB39 included assessment procedures to ensure proper academic placement of that student.

==== SB122 – Parental Rights in Public Education ====
The sentiments Osmond began with SB39 and his homeschool amendments continued with SB122, which reformed parent rights in their children’s education. He felt strongly that parents should hold the primary responsibility to educate their children, and schools and the state held a second responsibility with an obligation to support parents. To support this, he created what he called the “parental bill of rights”. Of note, this bill gave parents the freedom to retain a student on a grade level (for academic, social, emotional, or other reasons), select or change a teacher, visit and observe school freely, excuse their student without a doctor’s note, and determine placement in specialized or advanced courses.

==== A Stand Against Child Abuse – The HB286 Debate ====
While not a bill that Osmond was deeply involved with, HB286 was a turning point for him in both his legislative career and in his personal life. The legislation originated in the house and made its way to the senate with a number of important provisions to protect children against sexual abuse. One of these provisions allowed school districts and charter schools to provide instruction on recognizing and preventing abuse. The bill, as drafted, required such schools to send notification to parents of the instruction and include instructional materials to review. When the bill was on the senate floor, an amendment was proposed that would intensify these requirements and prohibit schools from providing such instruction unless parental consent had been obtained.

Osmond was very vocal in his defense of the original bill. He reiterated his firm belief in parental rights for education, but clarified that those rights were recognized in the bill as written. Parents would receive notification and have the opportunity to review the instructional materials. Requiring parental consent, he said, would allow too many children to slip through the cracks, leaving them vulnerable because their families missed the opportunity to give consent for these trainings. Osmond even went so far as to reveal—for the first time in his life—that he had been a victim of child abuse, and that, though he came from a strong family, the proposed amendment would require a consent that his parents may not have even seen a request for, much less given.

Osmond’s powerful stand for the bill against child abuse received a great deal of attention from the community, and he was recognized for his stance by the Prevent Child Abuse Utah association (PCAU) when they made him the recipient of the Anne Freimuth Child Advocate of the Year Award. A video was compiled, which included a recording of Osmond’s powerful defense of children and a speech given by his brother Joseph at the PCAU event where Osmond was honored.

=== 2015 ===
==== SB97 – Property Tax Equalization ====
For the 2015 session, Senator Osmond took on one of the most difficult issues of his time in the senate: education funding. Much of Utah’s education funding comes from property taxes, but the state’s property tax rate had not been adjusted since 1996, almost two decades before. Estimates indicated that inflation alone meant $90 million in losses due to this lack of change. At the same time, many school districts were not providing funding for their own students, and more than half were well below the state’s average per-pupil funding rate.

In an attempt to generate better funding for students, Osmond hoped to capture some of that revenue lost to inflation. He didn't go so far as to recapture all of it, but by capturing a portion ($75 million), he was able to bring all school districts up to at least that average per-pupil rate.

The bill Osmond proposed distributed the revenue generated by this property tax increase into existing funds (the Minimum Basic Growth Account, the Voted Levy Guarantee, the Capital Outlay Foundation Program, and the Capital Outlay Enrollment Growth Program). Districts that were most in need of funding received more of the revenue, while wealthy districts received less, thus equalizing to some degree the amount of per-pupil spending across the state. Early in the 2015 session, Osmond published a video explaining his hopes for the bill.

SB97 met with mixed responses. Some were very supportive of the increased and equalized school funding. Others were critical of the tax increase, especially since some districts in the state (Park City, for example) likely would not see much of the increased funding from the tax they paid. In the end, public polling showed support for the bill, but the margin was not large. Some members of Osmond’s own political party were ardently against this bill, which made democratic support essential to its passage. Osmond worked hard persuading members on both side of the aisle and managed to pass the bill 20-9 in the Senate and 43-31 in the house, with members from both parties working together to ensure its passage.

==== SB167 – Juvenile Offender Amendments ====
Also in 2015, Osmond ran a bill to alter the treatment of juvenile offenders in the criminal justice system. Among the amendments made, SB167 required new guidelines for housing convicted minors, required that the court ensure any waiver of counsel was knowing and intentional, and created a presumption that minors should not be shackled when appearing in court. Osmond felt very strongly that shackling all juvenile defendants was unnecessary and embarrassing, and ensured that such treatment would no longer be the norm.

== 2012 Legislation ==
Sponsored Bills
Number	Title of Bill	Primary Sponsor	Floor Sponsor	Status
SB0064	Public Education Employment Reform	Osmond, A.	Gibson, F.	Substituted
SB0064S01	Public Education Employment Reform	Osmond, A.	Gibson, F.	Enacted
SB0076	Collaborative Performance Bonus	Osmond, A.		Considered
SB0097	Grants For Online Testing	Osmond, A.	Wright, B.	Enacted
SB0109	Assault Amendments	Osmond, A.	Bird, J.	Considered
SB0162	Division of School Districts	Osmond, A.		Considered
SB0215	Teacher Induction and Remediation Assistance Pilot Program	Osmond, A.		Numbered
SB0216	Digital Safety for Utah Secondary Schools	Osmond, A.	Newbold, M.	Considered
SB0217	Math Materials Access Improvement Grant	Osmond, A.	Dougall, J.	Substituted
SB0217S01	Math Materials Access Improvement Grant	Osmond, A.	Dougall, J.	Enacted
SB0218	Public Education Engagement Reform	Osmond, A.		Numbered
SB0223	Pledge of Allegiance Amendments	Osmond, A.	Wright, B.	Enacted
SB0226	High Quality Preschool Project	Osmond, A.		Considered
SB0279	Health Funding Priorities	Osmond, A.		Numbered
SCR007	Concurrent Resolution Approving The Interlocal Agreement Creating The Jordan River Commons	Osmond, A.	Newbold, M.	Enacted
SCR013	Concurrent Resolution on Common Core Standards	Osmond, A.		Substituted
SCR013S01	Concurrent Resolution on Common Core Standards	Osmond, A.		Substituted
SCR013S02	Concurrent Resolution on Common Core Standards	Osmond, A.	Christensen, L.	Considered
SJR017	Joint Rules Resolution on Fiscal Notes	Osmond, A.		Numbered
SJR023	Joint Resolution on Human Life	Osmond, A.		Numbered
SJR026	Joint Resolution on Engagement on Public Education System	Osmond, A.	Wilson, B.	Considered

Floor Sponsored Bills
Number	Title of Bill	Primary Sponsor	Floor Sponsor	Co-Sponsor	Status
HB0062	Provisions Regarding School Supplies	Powell, K.	Osmond, A.		Enacted
HB0088	Custody Amendments	Wilcox, R.	Osmond, A.	Dee, B.; Gibson, F.; Hughes, G.; Ivory, K.; King, B.S.; Menlove, R.; Seelig, J.; Vickers, E.; Watkins, C.	Enacted
HB0105	Official Voter Register Amendments	Newbold, M.	Osmond, A.		Enacted
HB0014	Massage Therapy Act Amendments	Cosgrove, T.	Osmond, A.		Enacted
HB0115	Peer Assistance and Review Pilot Program	Moss, C.	Osmond, A.	Arent, P.; Bird, J.; Briscoe, J.; Cosgrove, T.; Edwards, R; Eliason, S.; Gibson, F.; Handy, S.; Hughes, G.; McIff, K.; Poulson, M.; Powell, K.; Watkins, C.	Enacted
HB0149	Online Education Survey	Eliason, S.	Osmond, A.		Enacted
HB0155	Drug Screening For Temporary Assistance For Needy Families Recipients	Wilson, B.	Osmond, A.	Barlow, S.; Bird, J.; Brown, D.; Daw, B.; Dee, B.; Dougall, J.; Draxler, J.; Eliason, S.; Greenwood, R.; Grover, K.; Herrod, C.; Hughes, G.; Ipson, D.; McCay, D.; Menlove, R.; Noel, M.; Oda, C; Perry, L.; Ray, P.; Sanpei, D.; Vickers, E.; Wilcox, R.	Enacted
HB0213	School Community Council Member Qualifications	Perry, L.	Osmond, A.		Substituted
HB0213S01	School Community Council Member Qualifications	Perry, L.	Osmond, A.		Enacted
HB0235	Offer of Judgment in Civil Cases	Ivory, K.	Osmond, A.		Considered
HB0236S01	Alimony Modifications	Sandstrom, S.	Osmond, A.		Considered
HB0240	Medical Retainer Agreements	Ivory, K.	Osmond, A.		Enacted
HB0261	Dividing of School Districts Amendments	Sumsion, K.	Osmond, A.		Enacted
HB0421	Local District Dissolution	McCay, D.	Osmond, A.		Considered
HB0500	Education Reporting Efficiency Amendments	Wilcox, R.	Osmond, A.		Enacted

Co-Sponsored Bills
Number	Title of Bill	Primary Sponsor	Floor Sponsor	Co-Sponsor	Status
SB0024	Research Tax Credit Amendments	Valentine, J.	Newbold, M.	Osmond, A.; Anderson, C.; Bramble, C.; Hinkins, D.; Jenkins, S.; Knudsen, P.; Madsen, M.; Mayne, K.; Morgan, K.; Okerlund, R.; Romero, R.; Stephenson, H.; Van Tassell, K.	Considered
SB0129	Unemployment Insurance Modifications	Bramble, C.	Peterson, J.	Osmond, A.; Adams, J.S.; Anderson, C.; Christensen, A.; Hillyard, L.; Hinkins, D.; Knudsen, P.; Madsen, M.; Okerlund, R.; Reid, S.; Stephenson, H.; Stevenson, J.; Thatcher, D.; Van Tassell, K.; Weiler, T.	Enacted
SB0289	K-3 Reading Program Technology	Adams, J.S.	Newbold, M.	Osmond, A.; Bramble, C.; Davis, G.; Escamilla (Robles), L.; Knudsen, P.; Madsen, M.; McAdams, B.; Morgan, K.; Niederhauser, W.; Okerlund, R.; Stevenson, J.; Urquhart, S.; Valentine, J.; Weiler, T.	Considered
SB0290	Utah Futures Program	Stephenson, H.	Hughes, G.	Osmond, A.	Substituted
SB0290S01	Utah Futures Program	Stephenson, H.	Hughes, G.	Osmond, A.	Enacted
SCR001	Concurrent Resolution Supporting Establishment of A Fund for Assistance to Families of Fallen Officers	Van Tassell, K.	Daw, B.	Osmond, A.; Adams, J.S.; Anderson, C.; Bramble, C.; Christensen, A.; Davis, G.; Dayton, M.; Escamilla (Robles), L.; Hillyard, L.; Hinkins, D.; Jenkins, S.; Jones, P.; Knudsen, P.; Madsen, M.; Mayne, K.; McAdams, B.; Morgan, K.; Niederhauser, W.; Okerlund, R.; Reid, S.; Romero, R.; Stephenson, H.; Stevenson, J.; Thatcher, D.; Urquhart, S.; Valentine, J.; Waddoups, M.; Weiler, T.	Enacted
SR0001	Informal Senate Poll on United States Senate Candidates Resolution	Anderson, C.		Osmond, A.; Adams, J.S.; Bramble, C.; Dayton, M.; Hinkins, D.; Jenkins, S.; Madsen, M.; Mayne, K.; McAdams, B.; Niederhauser, W.; Okerlund, R.; Reid, S.; Stephenson, H.; Stevenson, J.; Urquhart, S.; Valentine, J.; Van Tassell, K.; Weiler, T.	Enacted

2012 Special Session Bills
Number	Title of Bill	Primary Sponsor	Floor Sponsor	Status
SB4003	New School Year Supplemental Public Education Budget Adjustments	Osmond, A.	Brown, M.	Enacted

== 2013 Legislation ==
Sponsored Bills
Number	Title of BIll	Primary Sponsor	Floor Sponsor	Status
SB0071	Results-based Financing for Early Childhood Education	Osmond, A.	Hughes, G.	Substituted
SB0071S01	Results-based Financing for Early Childhood Education	Osmond, A.	Hughes, G.	Considered
SB0081	School Property Tax Funding	Osmond, A.	McCay, D.	Considered
SB0112	Work Week Amendments	Osmond, A.		Substituted
SB0112S01	Work Week Amendments	Osmond, A.	Bird, J.	Substituted
SB0112S03	Work Week Amendments	Osmond, A.	Bird, J.	Enacted
SB0122	Student Leadership Skills Development	Osmond, A.	Hughes, G.	Substituted
SB0122S01	Student Leadership Skills Development	Osmond, A.	Hughes, G.	Enacted
SB0131	Assault Amendments	Osmond, A.	Bird, J.	Enacted
SB0209	Grants for Personal Mobile Learning Devices	Osmond, A.	Hughes, G.	Considered
SCR007	Concurrent Resolution to Reduce Utah's Dependence on Federal Funds	Osmond, A.	Hutchings, E.	Enacted
SJR003	Joint Rules Resolution on Submitting and Numbering Legislation	Osmond, A.	Knotwell, J.	Substituted
SJR003S01	Joint Rules Resolution on Submitting and Numbering Legislation	Osmond, A.	Knotwell, J.	Enacted
SJR006	Joint Rules Resolution on Circled Bills	Osmond, A.		Considered
SJR013	Joint Resolution Urging Governor and Utah's Congressional Delegation to Secure Utah State Land	Osmond, A.	Stratton, K.	Enacted

Floor Sponsored Bills
Number	Title of Bill	Primary Sponsor	Floor Sponsor	Co-Sponsor(s)	Status
HB0013	Protection of Children Riding in Motor Vehicles	Arent, P.	Osmond, A.	Barlow, S.; Briscoe, J.; Brown, D.; Brown, M.; Chavez-Houck, R.; Crosgrove, T.; Draxler, J.; Edwards, R.; Eliason, S.; Hall, C.; King, B.S.; McIff, K.; Menlove, R.; Moss, C.; Perry, L.; Pitcher, D.; Poulson, M.; Powell, K.; Ray, P.; Redd, E.;Seelig, J.; Snow, V.L.	Enacted
HB0022	Utah Commission on Service and Volunteerism	Bird, J.	Osmond, A.		Enacted
HB0025	Agency Reporting Provisions	Bird, J.	Osmond, A.		Enacted
HB0115S02	Towing Amendments	Stratton, K.	Osmond, A.		Enacted
HB0157S01	Children's Hearing Aid Pilot Program	Edwards, R.	Osmond, A.		Enacted
HB0201	State Board of Education Leadership Amendments	Eliason, S.	Osmond, A.		Enacted
HB0204S04	Election Amendments	Eliason, S.	Osmond, A.		Substituted
HB0204S05	Election Amendments	Eliason, S.	Osmond, A.		Enacted
HB0220	Repeal of State Auditor Related Provisions	Knotwell, J.	Osmond, A.		Substituted
HB0220S01	Repeal of State Auditor Related Provisions	Knotwell, J.	Osmond, A.		Enacted
HB0239S02	Jury Service Amendments	Hall, C.	Osmond, A.		Enacted
HB0285	Modification of Education-related Reporting Requirements	Gibson, F.	Osmond, A.		Enacted
HB0298	Parent Seminar on Youth Protection	Eliason, S.	Osmond, A.		Enacted
HB0306	School Land Trust Program Amendments	Perry, L.	Osmond, A.		Enacted
HB0363	Public Education State Capitol Visit Funding	Eliason, S.	Osmond, A.		Enacted
HB0371	Interpreter Services for the Hearing Impaired Amendments	Menlove, R.	Osmond, A.		Enacted

Co-Sponsored Bills
Number	Title of Bill	Primary Sponsor	Floor Sponsor	Co-Sponsor(s)	Status
SB0079	Student-centered Learning Pilot Program	Stephenson, H.	McCay, D.	Osmond, A.; Adams, J.S.; Jenkins, S.; Knudson, P.; Madsen, M.; Reid, S.; Stevenson, J.; Urquhart, S.; Vickers, E.; Weiler, T.	Considered
SCR004S01	Standing with Israel Concurrent Resolution	Bramble, C.	Ivory, K.	Osmond, A.; Adams, J.S.; Christensen, A.; Dabakis, J.; Davis, G.; Dayton, M.; Escamilla (Robles) L.; Harper, W.; Henderson, D.; Hillyard, L.; Hinkins, D.; Jenkins, S.; Jones, P.; Knudson, P.; Madsen, M.; Mayne, K.; Neiderhauser, W.; Okerlund, R.; Reid, S.; Shiozawa, B.; Stephenson, H.; Stevenson, J.; Thatcher, D.; Urquhart, S.; Valentine, J.; Van Tassell, K.; Vickers, E.; Weiler, T.	

== 2014 Legislation ==
Sponsored
Number	Title of Bill	Primary Sponsor	Floor Sponsor	Co-Sponsor	Status
SB0031	State Agency Reporting Amendments	Osmond, A.	Edwards, R.		Enacted
SB0039	Home School Amendments	Osmond, A.			Substituted
SB0039S01	Home School Amendments	Osmond, A.	Knotwell, J.	Madsen, M.	Enacted
SB0042	Early Childhood Education	Osmond, A.	Menlove, R.		Considered
SB0101	Public Education Human Resource Management Amendments	Osmond, A.	Gibson, F.		Enacted
SB0103	Local Control of Classroom Time Requirements	Osmond, A.			Substituted
SB0103S01	Local Control of Classroom Time Requirements	Osmond, A.	Bird, J.		Enacted
SB0104	Improvement of Reading Instruction	Osmond, A.	Menlove, R.		Enacted
SB0109	Radon Testing for Home Purchase	Osmond, A.			Substituted
SB0109S02	Radon Awareness Campaign	Osmond, A.	Stratton, K.		Enacted
SB0110	Guardianship Costs for Parents of Disabled Adult Child	Osmond, A.			Substituted
SB0110S01	Guardianship Forms for Parents of Disabled Adult Child	Osmond, A.	McCay, D.		Enacted
SB0111	Education Funding Equalization	Osmond, A.			Substituted
SB0111S02	Education Funding Equalization	Osmond, A.			Substituted
SB0111S03	Education Funding Equalization	Osmond, A.			Considered
SB0122	Parental Rights and Accountability in Public Education	Osmond, A.			Substituted
SB0122S01	Parental Rights in Public Education	Osmond, A.	Cunningham, R.	Madsen, M.	Substituted
SB0122S02	Parental Rights in Public Education	Osmond, A.	Cunningham, R.	Madsen, M.	Enacted
SB0131	Student Leadership Grant	Osmond, A.	Briscoe, J.		Substituted
SB0131S01	Student Leadership Grant	Osmond, A.	Briscoe, J.		Enacted
SB0149	Drowsy Driving Amendments	Osmond, A.	Stratton, K.		Substituted
SB0149S01	Drowsy Driving Amendments	Osmond, A.	Stratton, K.		Enacted
SB0215	Public School Comprehensive Emergency Response Plan Amendments	Osmond, A.	Cunningham, R.		Enacted
SB0236	Higher Education Admission Amendments	Osmond, A.			Considered
SB0244	Modifications to Property Tax	Osmond, A.			Substituted
SB0244S01	Modifications to Property Tax	Osmond, A.	Hutchings, E.		Enacted
SCR001	Concurrent Resolution Recognizing the 60th Anniversary of the Inclusion of Under God in the Pledge of Allegiance	Osmond, A.	Christensen, L.		Enacted
SJR002	Joint Resolution on Legislative Power	Osmond, A.			Considered

Floor Sponsored
Number	Title of Bill	Primary Sponsor	Floor Sponsor	Co-Sponsor	Status
HB0022	Workforce Services Amendments	Edwards, R.	Osmond, A.		Enacted
HB0033	Reauthorization of Utah Commission on Service and Volunteerism	Edwards, R.	Osmond, A.		Enacted
HB0041	Clean Fuel School Buses and Infrastructure	Handy, S.	Osmond, A.	Anderson, Johnny; Anderson, Jerry; Arent, P.; Barlow, S.; Barrus, R.; Bird, J.; Briscoe, J.; Cosgrove, T.; Dee, B.; Draxler, J.; Duckworth, S.; Edwards, R.; Eliason, S.; Fisher, J.; Hemingway, L.; Hutchings, E.; Ipson, D.; Layton, D.; Lifferth, D.; Nelson, M.; Noel, M.; Perry, L.; Peterson, J.; Pitcher, D.; Poulson, M.; Redd, E.; Romero, A.; Sagers, D.; Seelig, J.; Snow, V.L.; Spendlove, R.; Stratton, K.; Tanner, E.; Westwood, J.; Wheatley, M.; Wiley, L.	Considered
HB0109S02	Public Education Capital Funding Equalization	Ivory, K.	Osmond, A.		Considered
HB0236	State School Board Nomination Revisions	Powell, K.	Osmond, A.		Considered
HB0274	Committee Subpoena Powers Amendment	Bird, J.	Osmond, A.		Enacted
HB0320S01	Educators' Professional Learning	Last, B.	Osmond, A.		Enacted
HB0329	Programs for Youth Protection	Eliason, S.	Osmond, A.		Enacted
HB0368	Jury Duty Amendments	Hall, C.	Osmond, A.		Considered
HB0409	Statewide Education Coordinating Committee	Eliason, S.	Osmond, A.		Considered

Co-Sponsored
Number	Title of Bill	Primary Sponsor	Floor Sponsor	Co-Sponsor	Status
SB0211	Water Rights Amendments	Dayton, M.	Grover, K.	Osmond, A.; Adams, J.; Bramble, C.; Christensen, A.; Henderson, D.; Hinkins, D.; Jenkins, S.; Knudson, P.; Niederhauser, W.; Okerlund, R.; Reid, S.; Stephenson, H.; Stevenson, J.; Thatcher, D.; Valentine, J.; Van Tassell, K.; Weiler, T.	Considered

== 2015 Legislation ==
Sponsored
Number	Title of Bill	Primary Sponsor	Floor Sponsor	Co-Sponsor	Status
SB0018	Governor's Office of Economic Development Revisions	Osmond, A.	Edwards, R.		Enacted
SB0033	Public School Early Graduation Amendments	Osmond, A.			Substituted
SB0033S01	Public School Early Graduation Amendments	Osmond, A.	McCay, D.		Considered
SB0034	Charter School Authorization Amendments	Osmond, A.		Stephenson, H.	Substituted
SB0034S01	Charter School Authorization Amendments	Osmond, A.		Stephenson, H.	Considered
SB0037	Data Reporting Regarding Front-line Teachers	Osmond, A.	Christensen, L.		Considered
SB0038	Behavioral Testing and Tracking Restrictions	Osmond, A.	Gibson, F.		Enacted
SB0048	Evaluating Federal Land	Osmond, A.			Substituted
SB0048S01	Evaluating Federal Land	Osmond, A.	Lifferth, D.		Considered
SB0053	State Domestic Animal	Osmond, A.	Daw, B.	Mayne, K.	Considered
SB0054	Credit Monitoring for Minors	Osmond, A.	Cunningham, R.		Substituted
SB0054S01	Credit Monitoring for Minors	Osmond, A.	Cunningham, R.		Enacted
SB0084	Federal Nutrition Standards Exemptions	Osmond, A.			Substituted
SB0084S01	State Control of School Nutrition Standards	Osmond, A.			Considered
SB0097	Property Tax Equalization Amendments	Osmond, A.			Substituted
SB0097S01	Property Tax Equalization Amendments	Osmond, A.			Substituted
SB0097S03	Property Tax Equalization Amendments	Osmond, A.	Last, B.		Enacted
SB0114	Board of Education Compensation Amendments	Osmond, A.	Hall, C.		Substituted
SB0114S01	Board of Education Compensation Amendments	Osmond, A.	Hall, C.		Enacted
SB0116	Public School Dropout Recovery	Osmond, A.			Substituted
SB0116S01	Public School Dropout Recovery	Osmond, A.		Bramble, C.; Hillyard, L.; Jackson, A.; Knudson, P.; Stephenson, H.; Stevenson, J.; Thatcher, D.; Urquhart, S.; Weiler, T.	Substituted
SB0116S02	Public School Dropout Recovery	Osmond, A.	Gibson, F.	Bramble, C.; Hillyard, L.; Jackson, A.; Knudson, P.; Stephenson, H.; Stevenson, J.; Thatcher, D.; Urquhart, S.; Weiler, T.	Substituted
SB0116S03	Public School Dropout Recovery	Osmond, A.	Gibson, F.	Bramble, C.; Hillyard, L.; Jackson, A.; Knudson, P.; Stephenson, H.; Stevenson, J.; Thatcher, D.; Urquhart, S.; Weiler, T.	Substituted
SB0116S05	Public School Dropout Recovery	Osmond, A.	Gibson, F.	Bramble, C.; Hillyard, L.; Jackson, A.; Knudson, P.; Stephenson, H.; Stevenson, J.; Thatcher, D.; Urquhart, S.; Weiler, T.	Enacted
SB0117	Interventions for Reading Difficulties Pilot Program	Osmond, A.	Gibson, F.		Enacted
SB0148	Children with Cancer Special License Plate	Osmond, A.			Considered
SB0151	National Board Certification Scholarships for Teachers	Osmond, A.			Substituted
SB0151S01	National Board Certification Scholarships for Teachers	Osmond, A.			Considered
SB0152	Sales and Use Tax Exemption for A Qualifying Artistic Work	Osmond, A.			Considered
SB0167	Juvenile Offender Amendments	Osmond, A.	Snow, V.L.		Enacted
SB0204	Parental Rights in Public Education Amendments	Osmond, A.			Substituted
SB0204S01	Parental Rights in Public Education Amendments	Osmond, A.	Cunningham, R.		Substituted
SB0204S02	Parental Rights in Public Education Amendments	Osmond, A.	Cunningham, R.		Enacted
SB0223	USTAR Governance Amendments	Osmond, A.	Edwards, R.		Substituted
SB0223S01	USTAR Governance Amendments	Osmond, A.	Edwards, R.		Enacted
SB0262	Intergenerational Poverty Education Amendments	Osmond, A.	Hutchings, E		Substituted
SB0262S02	Intergenerational Poverty Education Amendments	Osmond, A.	Hutchings, E		Considered
SB0268	Student Leadership Skills Grant	Osmond, A.	Eliason, S.		Enacted
SCR001	Concurrent Resolution to Change Utah's Designated Time Zone and Observance of Daylight Saving Time	Osmond, A.			Considered

Floor Sponsored Bills
Number	Title of Bill	Primary Sponsor	Floor Sponsor	Co-Sponsor(s)	Status
HB0018	Children's Hearing Aid Program Amendments	Edwards, R.	Osmond, A.		Substituted
HB0018S02	Children's Hearing Aid Program Amendments	Edwards, R.	Osmond, A.		Enacted
HB0020	Jury Duty Amendments	Hall, C.	Osmond, A.		Enacted
HB0021	Department of Workforce Services Sunset Authorization	Edwards, R.	Osmond, A.		Enacted
HB0045	Local Governing Body Amendments	Cunningham, R.	Osmond, A.		Substituted
HB0045S01	Local Governing Body Amendments	Cunningham, R.	Osmond, A.		Substituted
HB0045S02	Local Governing Body Amendments	Cunningham, R.	Osmond, A.		Substituted
HB0065S03	Workforce Services Amendments	Edwards, R.	Osmond, A.		Enacted
HB0112	Hearing Instrument Specialist Amendments	Froerer, G.	Osmond, A.		Substituted
HB0112S01	Hearing Instrument Specialist Amendments	Froerer, G.	Osmond, A.		Enacted
HB0118S01	Public Education Human Resource Management	Last, B.	Osmond, A.		Enacted
HB0172	Payroll Services Amendments	Spendlove, R.	Osmond, A.		Enacted
HB0225	Goblin Valley State Park Expansion	Eliason, S.	Osmond, A.		Considered
HB0248S02	Campaign Finance Reporting Revisions	Hall, C.	Osmond, A.		Enacted
HB0277	Statute of Limitations for Civil Actions	Ivory, K.	Osmond, A.	Anderegg, J.; Arent, P.; Briscoe, J.; Chavez-Houck, R.; Duckworth, S.; Grover, K.; Hollins, S.; Kennedy, M.; Lifferth, D.; Moss, C.; Poulson, M.; Romero, A.; Stratton, K.; Wheatley, M.	Enacted
HB0292	Emergency Medical Service Providers Amendments	McCay, D.	Osmond, A.		Enacted
HB0345S02	Education Abuse Policy	McCay, D.	Osmond, A.		Enacted
HB0366	Statute of Limitations for Sexual Offenses	Christofferson, K.	Osmond, A.	Eliason, S.	Substituted
HB0366S01	Statute of Limitations for Sexual Offenses	Christofferson, K.	Osmond, A.	Eliason, S.	Considered
HB0373	Connected Vehicle Testing	Knotwell, J.	Osmond, A.		Enacted
HB0403	Online Education Survey Program Amendments	Eliason, S.	Osmond, A.		Enacted
HCR001	Concurrent Resolution Designating Start by Believing Day	Romero, A.	Osmond, A.		Enacted
HCR007	Concurrent Resolution Urging Development of Methods to Minimize Excessive Testing and its Negative Impacts on the School Children of Utah	Poulson, M.	Osmond, A.		Enacted
HJR008S01	Proposal to Amend Utah Constitution - Oath of Office Change	Powell, K.	Osmond, A.		Enacted

Co-Sponsored Bills
Number	Title of Bill	Primary Sponsor	Floor Sponsor	Co-Sponsor(s)	Status
SB0119	Prescription Database Revisions	Weiler, T.	McCay, D.	Osmond, A.; Dabakis, J.; Escamilla, L.; Henderson, D.; Jackson, A.; Knudson, P.; Madsen, M.; Thatcher, D.	Substituted
SB0119	Prescription Database Revisions	Weiler, T.	McCay, D.	Osmond, A.; Dabakis, J.; Escamilla, L.; Henderson, D.; Jackson, A.; Knudson, P.; Madsen, M.; Thatcher, D.	Enacted
SCR006	Concurrent Resolution Supporting Vietnam Veterans	Bramble, C.	Peterson, V.	Osmond, A.; Adams, J.S.; Christensen, A.; Dabakis, J.; Davis, G.; Dayton, M.; Escamilla, L.; Harper, W.; Henderson, D.; Hillyard, L.; Hinkins, D.; Iwamoto, J.; Jackson, A.; Jenkins, S.; Knudson, P.; Madsen, M.; Mayne, K.; Milner, A.; Niederhauser, W.; Okerlund, R.; Shiozawa, B.; Stephenson, H.; Stevenson, J.; Thatcher, D.; Urquhart, S.; Van Tassell, K.; Vickers, E.; Weiler, T.	Enacted
SJR017	Joint Resolution Recognizing the 800th Anniversary of the Magna Carta	Stephenson, H.	Coleman, K.	Osmond, A.; Adams, J.S.; Bramble, C.; Christensen, A.; Dabakis, J.; Davis, G.; Dayton, M.; Escamilla, L.; Harper, W.; Henderson, D.; Hillyard, L.; Hinkins, D.; Iwamoto, J.; Jackson, A.; Jenkins, S.; Knudson, P.; Madsen, M.; Mayne, K.; Milner, A.; Niederhauser, W.; Okerlund, R.; Shiozawa, B.; Stevenson, J.; Thatcher, D.; Urquhart, S.; Van Tassell, K.; Vickers, E.; Weiler, T.	Substituted
SJR017S01	Joint Resolution Recognizing the 800th Anniversary of the Magna Carta	Stephenson, H.	Coleman, K.	Osmond, A.; Adams, J.S.; Bramble, C.; Christensen, A.; Dabakis, J.; Davis, G.; Dayton, M.; Escamilla, L.; Harper, W.; Henderson, D.; Hillyard, L.; Hinkins, D.; Iwamoto, J.; Jackson, A.; Jenkins, S.; Knudson, P.; Madsen, M.; Mayne, K.; Milner, A.; Niederhauser, W.; Okerlund, R.; Shiozawa, B.; Stevenson, J.; Thatcher, D.; Urquhart, S.; Van Tassell, K.; Vickers, E.; Weiler, T.	Enacted
