= Isaac Austin =

American basketball player-coach (born 1969)

Personal information
- Born: August 18, 1969 (age 57) Gridley, California, U.S.
- Listed height: 6 ft 10 in (2.08 m)
- Listed weight: 288 lb (131 kg)

Career information
- High school: Las Plumas (Oroville, California)
- College: Reedley (1987–1989); Arizona State (1989–1991)
- NBA draft: 1991: 2nd round, 48th overall pick
- Drafted by: Utah Jazz
- Playing career: 1991–2004
- Position: Center
- Number: 50, 8, 9
- Coaching career: 2004–2005

Career history

Playing
- 1991–1993: Utah Jazz
- 1993–1994: Oklahoma City Cavalry
- 1994: Philadelphia 76ers
- 1994–1995: CRO Lyon
- 1995–1996: Tuborg Pilsener
- 1996–1998: Miami Heat
- 1998: Los Angeles Clippers
- 1999: Orlando Magic
- 1999–2000: Washington Wizards
- 2000–2002: Vancouver / Memphis Grizzlies
- 2002: Ülkerspor
- 2003: Xinjiang Flying Tigers
- 2004: Jersey Squires

Coaching
- 2004–2005: Utah Snowbears

Career highlights
- NBA Most Improved Player (1997); First-team All-Pac-10 (1991)

Career NBA statistics
- Points: 3,285 (7.6 ppg)
- Rebounds: 2,030 (4.7 rpg)
- Assists: 538 (1.2 apg)
- Stats at NBA.com
- Stats at Basketball Reference

Isaac Edward "Ike" Austin (born August 18, 1969) is an American former professional basketball player who played for several different teams in the National Basketball Association between 1991 and 2002. He is the uncle of former Baylor University basketball player Isaiah Austin.

Austin was born in Gridley, California. A 6-foot-10-inch (2.08 m) center from Kings River Community College and Arizona State University, he was selected by the Utah Jazz in the second round (48th overall) of the 1991 NBA draft. He averaged two points and 1.1 rebounds during his rookie season with the Jazz, and after two more sub-par seasons, he signed to play with Tuborg İzmir, a Turkish basketball team. Austin averaged 22.3 points and 13.9 rebounds during the 1995–1996 season in Turkey, and he returned to the NBA the following season as a member of the Miami Heat.

With renewed confidence, Austin averaged 9.7 points and 5.8 rebounds for the Heat and received the NBA Most Improved Player Award in 1997. Austin had his best season in 1997–1998, when he averaged 13.5 points and 7.1 rebounds while playing for the Heat and the Los Angeles Clippers (to whom he was traded midseason for Brent Barry). After that season, he signed a lucrative contract with the Orlando Magic, but his play began to regress. Austin was traded to the Washington Wizards for Ben Wallace, Terry Davis, Tim Legler, and Jeff McInnis after one season with the Magic, and the Wizards later traded him to the Vancouver Grizzlies for Cherokee Parks, Obinna Ekezie, Dennis Scott, and Felipe Lopez. He ended his NBA career with the Grizzlies in 2002 (the team moved to Memphis in 2001).

From 2004 to 2005, Austin was owner and head coach of the Utah Snowbears, a team in the American Basketball Association. He led the Snowbears to a 27–1 record in the team's first season, but feuded with league officials during the playoffs and decided to forfeit the rest of the season (and later on, fold the team) in protest.
