= Zendon Hamilton =

American basketball player and coach (born 1975)

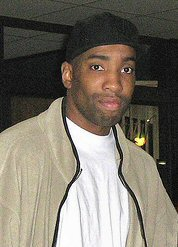
- Hamilton in 2007

Personal information
- Born: April 29, 1975 (age 51) South Floral Park, New York, U.S.
- Listed height: 6 ft 11 in (2.11 m)
- Listed weight: 254 lb (115 kg)

Career information
- High school: Sewanhaka (Floral Park, New York)
- College: St. John's (1994–1998)
- NBA draft: 1998: undrafted
- Playing career: 1998–2012
- Position: Center / power forward
- Number: 25, 54, 42, 31
- Coaching career: 2013–present

Career history

Playing
- 1998–1999: CB Valladolid
- 1999–2000: Dafni BC
- 2000–2001: Los Angeles Clippers
- 2001–2002: Denver Nuggets
- 2003: Toronto Raptors
- 2003: Joventut Badalona
- 2003: Yakima Sun Kings
- 2003–2004: Philadelphia 76ers
- 2004–2005: Milwaukee Bucks
- 2005–2006: Cleveland Cavaliers
- 2006: Philadelphia 76ers
- 2006–2007: Śląsk Wrocław
- 2007–2008: Enisey Krasnoyarsk
- 2008–2009: Spartak Primorye
- 2009–2010: Al-Jalaa SC
- 2010–2011: Polytekhnika-Halychyna Lviv
- 2012: Springfield Armor
- 2012: Institución Atlética Larre Borges

Coaching
- 2013–2014: Idaho Stampede (assistant)
- 2016–2018: Texas Legends (assistant)
- 2018–2020: Agua Caliente Clippers (assistant)

Career highlights
- 3× Second-team All-Big East (1996–1998); McDonald's All-American (1994); First-team Parade All-American (1994); Second-team Parade All-American (1993); Third-team Parade All-American (1992)

Career statistics
- Points: 585 (4.4 ppg)
- Rebounds: 464 (3.5 rpg)
- Steals: 39 (0.3 spg)
- Stats at NBA.com
- Stats at Basketball Reference

Zendon Alphonso Hamilton (born April 29, 1975) is an American professional basketball coach and former player. He played in the National Basketball Association (NBA) from 2000 to 2006.

== Amateur career ==
Hamilton, a 6'11" center played high school basketball at Floral Park, New York's Sewanhaka High School. Hamilton played college basketball at St. John's University, where he was a part of the same recruiting class as Sports Illustrated cover boy Felipe López.

== Pro career ==
After two seasons in Europe, Hamilton began his NBA career in the 2000–01 NBA season with the Los Angeles Clippers. He had previously played with the Dallas Mavericks in the NBA pre-season in 1999, but he did not play in any official NBA games with Dallas. He has also played for the Denver Nuggets, the Toronto Raptors, the Philadelphia 76ers, the Milwaukee Bucks, and the Cleveland Cavaliers. He was signed on October 1, 2006, by the Portland Trail Blazers, but after the pre-season he was waived on October 25, 2006, without playing any regular season games with the club.

In February 2007, he joined Śląsk Wrocław. In the summer of 2007, he moved to Russia and signed with Enisey Krasnoyarsk. In 2008, he joined Spartak Primorje. In 2010, he joined Polytekhnika-Halychyna Lviv. In 2012, he joined Larre Borges of Uruguay.

== NBA career statistics ==
Legend
GP	Games played	GS	Games started	MPG	Minutes per game
FG%	Field goal percentage	3P%	3-point field goal percentage	FT%	Free throw percentage
RPG	Rebounds per game	APG	Assists per game	SPG	Steals per game
BPG	Blocks per game	PPG	Points per game	**Bold**	Career high

=== Regular season ===
Year	Team	GP	GS	MPG	FG%	3P%	FT%	RPG	APG	SPG	BPG	PPG
2000–01	Los Angeles	3	0	6.3	.222	.000	.625	2.7	0.0	0.0	0.0	3.0
2001–02	Denver	**54**	**15**	**15.7**	.420	.000	.652	**4.7**	0.3	0.4	**0.3**	**6.0**
2002–03	Toronto	3	0	4.0	.400	.000	**1.000**	1.3	0.0	0.3	0.0	2.0
2003–04	Philadelphia	46	0	10.3	.537	.000	.698	3.2	0.3	0.2	0.2	3.7
2004–05	Milwaukee	16	0	9.9	.344	.000	.604	2.6	**0.4**	0.3	0.1	3.2
2005–06	Cleveland	11	0	4.2	**.538**	.000	.688	1.0	0.0	0.3	0.0	2.3
2005–06	Philadelphia	1	0	3.0	.000	.000	.500	0.0	0.0	**1.0**	0.0	1.0
Career		134	15	11.6	.440	.000	.660	3.5	0.2	0.3	0.2	4.4

== Coaching ==
In October 2013, Hamilton was hired by the Idaho Stampede as an assistant coach for the 2013–14 season.

On October 18, 2016, Hamilton was hired by the Texas Legends to be an assistant coach.

Hamilton joined the Agua Caliente Clippers as an assistant coach in 2018.
