= Willie Mitchell (basketball) =

American former professional basketball player

Personal information
- Born: May 6, 1975 (age 51) Detroit, Michigan, U.S.
- Listed height: 6 ft 8 in (2.03 m)

Career information
- High school: Pershing (Detroit, Michigan)
- College: Michigan (1994–1996); UAB (1997–1999)
- NBA draft: 1999: undrafted
- Playing career: 1999–2008
- Position: Forward

Career highlights
- Mr. Basketball of Michigan (1994); McDonald's All-American (1994); Second-team Parade All-American (1994); Fourth-team Parade All-American (1993)

Willie Dion Mitchell III (born May 6, 1975) is an American former professional basketball player. In high school, he was the 1994 Mr. Basketball of Michigan. He attended the University of Michigan and the University of Alabama at Birmingham before becoming a professional. He has had multiple stints in the Continental Basketball Association (CBA) and various foreign basketball leagues. He was a passenger in the rollover accident whose investigation led to the University of Michigan basketball scandal.

== High school ==
The 6-foot-8-inch (2.03 m) Mitchell earned the 1994 Mr. Basketball of Michigan title after leading Detroit Pershing High School to two Michigan High School Athletic Association (MHSAA) Class A basketball championships in 1992 and 1993 as well as a runner-up finish in 1994. During his time at Pershing the team accumulated a 92–11 record. He averaged 21.9 points and 11 rebounds during his senior season, but the team lost to Detroit Public School League rival Robert Traylor's Detroit Murray–Wright High School in the MHSAA championships. He was named both McDonald's All-American and Magic's Roundball Classic selections during his senior season. He was named Detroit News All-State his sophomore (4th team), junior and senior seasons.

== College ==
He was part of a highly touted Michigan Wolverines men's basketball recruiting class dubbed Fab Five II or Frosh Five that included Maurice Taylor, Jerod Ward, Maceo Baston, and Travis Conlan and that entered Michigan during the senior season of Jimmy King and Ray Jackson (the only two original Fab Five members who did not declare early for the National Basketball Association). During his sophomore 1995–1996 season he missed seven games between December 5, 1995–January 3, 1996 to a knee injury. After returning to the lineup, he was a passenger in the February 17, 1996 rollover accident whose investigation led to the University of Michigan basketball scandal. Although he was involved in the accident, he was not among the players called before the grand jury (Robert Traylor, Chris Webber, Jalen Rose, Maurice Taylor, and Louis Bullock) and was not found to have received large amounts of money. He and Ward were 1994 McDonald's All-American Team members and the following season 1995 McDonald's All-Americans Bullock, Traylor, and Albert White would also join Michigan. He had started the last three games prior to his knee injury after having started only five of the first thirty-five games of his Michigan career. After returning from the injury, he only started two of eighteen games. Willie Mitchell transferred to the UAB Blazers men's basketball team after the 1996 season.

== Professional ==
He was drafted in the 1999 CBA draft by the Yakama Sun Kings. He played one season for the Kings before playing professionally in Europe and Asia until 2006. In 2006, he played in the American Basketball Association before returning to the CBA in 2007 where he played for the Minot Skyrockets. He most recently played for the Quad City Riverhawks in 2008. Among the other teams he has played for are the Hong Kong Flying Dragons of the Chinese Basketball Association, Neptūnas Klaipėda of the Lithuanian Basketball League, Vantaa Pussihukat of the Korisliiga, and AZS Koszalin of the Dominet Basket Liga. He has also been affiliated with San Diego Stingrays of the International Basketball Association and the Detroit Wheels of the American Basketball Association.
