= 1994 McDonald's All-American Boys Game =

American high school basketball game

East	West
112	110
	1st half	2nd half	Total
East	60	52	112
West	56	54	110
- Date: April 3, 1994
- Venue: Alumni Hall (Carnesecca Arena), Queens, New York
- MVP: Felipe López
- Referees: 1 Tom Lopes; 2 Rich San Fillipo; 3 Joe Vigna
- Attendance: 6,008
- Network: CBS

McDonald's All-American

The 1994 McDonald's All-American Boys Game was an All-star basketball game played on Sunday, April 3, 1994 at Carnesecca Arena in Jamaica, New York. The game's rosters featured the best and most highly recruited high school boys graduating in 1994. The game was the 17th annual version of the McDonald's All-American Game first played in 1978.

== 1994 game ==
The game was telecast live by CBS. The East team included many guards, while the West could rely on more forwards and centers. Trajan Langdon became the first McDonald's All-American from the state of Alaska. Felipe López, the local fan favorite, was named the MVP of the game, having scored 24 points. Other players who starred were Zendon Hamilton, Kareem Reid, Antoine Walker and Jerod Ward. The game score was close, and the West almost completed a comeback, led by Andrae Patterson who scored many points in the last minutes. Of the 22 players, 10 went on to play in the NBA.

=== East roster ===
No.	Name	Height	Weight	Position	Hometown	High school	College of Choice
3	Curtis Staples	6-2	186	G	Mouth of Wilson, VA, U.S.	Oak Hill Academy	Virginia
12	Kareem Reid	5-11	165	G	Bronx, NY, U.S.	St. Raymond	Arkansas
13	Felipe López	6-5	199	G	Manhattan, NY, U.S.	Rice	St. John's
21	Steve Wojciechowski	5-11	170	G	Baltimore, MD, U.S.	Cardinal Gibbons	Duke
24	Chris Herren	6-2	197	G	Fall River, MA, U.S.	Durfee	Boston College
30	Adonal Foyle	6-10	250	C	Hamilton, NY, U.S.	Hamilton Central	Colgate
31	Zendon Hamilton	6-11	250	C	Floral Park, NY, U.S.	Sewanhaka	St. John's
33	Norman Nolan	6-8	240	F	Baltimore, MD, U.S.	Paul Laurence Dunbar	Virginia
44	LaMarr Greer	6-3	210	G	Cape May Courthouse, NJ, U.S.	Middle Township	Florida State
52	Corey Louis	6-10	225	C	Miami, FL, U.S.	Miami Northwestern	Florida State
54	Daniel Fortson	6-9	260	F	Pittsburgh, PA, U.S.	Shaler Area	Cincinnati

=== West roster ===
No.	Name	Height	Weight	Position	Hometown	High school	College of Choice
3	Ricky Price	6-5	195	F	Gardena, CA, U.S.	Serra	Duke
5	Neil Reed	6-4	190	G	Metairie, LA, U.S.	East Jefferson	Indiana
21	Trajan Langdon	6-4	197	G	Anchorage, AK, U.S.	East Anchorage	Duke
23	Antoine Walker	6-8	224	F	Chicago, IL, U.S.	Mount Carmel	Kentucky
24	Willie Mitchell	6-8	235	F	Detroit, MI, U.S.	Pershing	Michigan.
31	Jelani Gardner	6-6	205	G	Bellflower, CA, U.S.	St. John Bosco	Pepperdine
32	Jerod Ward	6-9	225	F	Clinton, MS, U.S.	Clinton	Michigan
42	Lorenzen Wright	6-10	225	C	Memphis, TN, U.S.	Booker T. Washington	Memphis
45	Raef LaFrentz	6-11	240	F / C	Monona, IA, U.S.	MFL MarMac	Kansas
50	Omm'A Givens	6-11	235	C	Aberdeen, WA, U.S.	Aberdeen	UCLA
53	Andrae Patterson	6-9	238	C	Abilene, TX, U.S.	Cooper	Indiana

=== Coaches ===
The East team was coached by:

- Head Coach Jack Curran of Archbishop Molloy High School (Queens, New York)

The West team was coached by:

- Coached by Vince Clemons of Merced High School

== All-American Week ==
=== Contest winners ===
- The 1994 Slam Dunk contest was won by Ricky Price.
- The 1994 3-point shoot-out was won by Trajan Langdon.
