= Andrae Patterson =

American basketball player (born 1975)

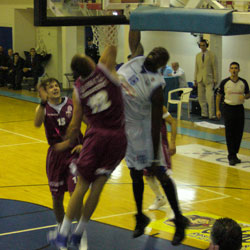

Portland Trail Blazers
- Title: Assistant general manager
- League: NBA

Personal information
- Born: November 12, 1975 (age 51) Riverside, California, U.S.
- Listed height: 6 ft 9 in (2.06 m)
- Listed weight: 255 lb (116 kg)

Career information
- High school: Cooper (Abilene, Texas)
- College: Indiana (1994–1998)
- NBA draft: 1998: 2nd round, 46th overall pick
- Drafted by: Minnesota Timberwolves
- Playing career: 1998–2009
- Position: Power forward / center
- Number: 45
- Coaching career: 2012–present

Career history

Playing
- 1998–2001: Minnesota Timberwolves
- 2001–2002: Estudiantes
- 2002–2003: Ricoh Manresa
- 2003–2005: Estudiantes
- 2005–2006: Ricoh Manresa
- 2006: Zadar
- 2006: Ironi Ashkelon
- 2006–2007: Panellinios
- 2007–2009: Aigaleo

Coaching
- 2012–2014: Texas–Arlington (assistant)
- 2014–2015: Idaho Stampede (assistant)

Career highlights
- Texas Mr. Basketball (1994); McDonald's All-American (1994); First-team Parade All-American (1994); Second-team Parade All-American (1993)
- Stats at NBA.com
- Stats at Basketball Reference

Andrae Malone Patterson (born November 12, 1975) is an American former professional basketball player who currently works with the Portland Trail Blazers as the assistant general manager. He played college basketball for the Indiana Hoosiers.

== College career ==
Patterson played college basketball for the Indiana Hoosiers under head coach Bobby Knight.

== Professional career ==
The Minnesota Timberwolves drafted him in the second round of the 1998 NBA draft with the 46th overall pick. He played in 40 career regular season games with Minnesota, through the 1999-2000 season. Following his NBA career, Patterson had several stops in Europe, including Zadar, Ricoh Manresa, Ironi Ashkelon, Panellinios, and most notably Adecco Estudiantes, before joining Aigaleo in 2007.

On July 1, 2015, Patterson joined the Utah Jazz front office as player personnel/player programs coordinator.
