= Omm'A Givens =

American basketball player (born 1975)

Personal information
- Born: 1975 (age 50–51) Frances, Washington, U.S.
- Listed height: 211 cm (6 ft 11 in)
- Listed weight: 109 kg (240 lb)

Career information
- High school: Aberdeen (Aberdeen, Washington)
- College: UCLA (1994–1996); Pepperdine (1997–1998)
- NBA draft: 1998: undrafted
- Position: Forward

Career history
- 1998–1999: Magic City Snowbears
- 1999–2000: La Crosse Bobcats
- 2000: Fort Wayne Fury
- 2000: Gallitos de Isabela
- 2001–2002: Roanoke Dazzle

Career highlights
- NCAA champion (1995); McDonald's All-American (1994); 2× Third-team Parade All-American (1993, 1994)

Omm'A Givens (born 1975) is an American former professional basketball player. A high school basketball All-American, he was a center for the UCLA Bruins on their 1995 national championship team.

== High school ==
Givens attended high school in Aberdeen, Washington, where he was a highly touted college basketball recruit. In his junior year he averaged 18.4 points and 8.8 rebounds per game, while in his senior year he improved his scoring average to 23.4 points per game. He was selected to the McDonald's All-American Team in his senior year, was the Washington state Gatorade Player of the Year, and was twice selected as a Parade All-American. He broke the tournament scoring record for boys high school basketball in Washington State.

== College ==
Givens joined UCLA in 1994–95, and won a national championship with the team that season. He opted out of his UCLA scholarship in 1996 after having spent the 1995–96 season as a reserve with 20 appearances (0 starts and 11.6 minutes per game) and transferred to Pepperdine University. He was suspended for two games by Pepperdine's coach Lorenzo Romar in January 1998 after punching and breaking the jaw of teammate Aaron Butler at practice. After being briefly reinstated he was suspended by the school for the rest of the season later that month. He left the Pepperdine basketball team after the season and passed up his final season of eligibility.

== Professional career ==
Givens played for Magic City Snowbears in the International Basketball Association during the 1998–1999 season, averaging 12.9 points and 7.8 rebounds, leading the team to home-court advantage in the IBA playoffs. In 2001 he joined Roanoke Dazzle of the National Basketball Development League. In 23 games during the 2001–2002 NBDL season, Givens averaged 3.0 points and 2.1 rebounds in 11.4 minutes per game.
