= Jelani Gardner =

American-French basketball coach and former professional player (born 1975)

Personal information
- Born: December 26, 1975 (age 50) Pasadena, California
- Listed height: 6 ft 6 in (1.98 m)
- Listed weight: 205 lb (93 kg)

Career information
- High school: St. John Bosco (Bellflower, California)
- College: California (1994–1996); Pepperdine (1997–1999)
- NBA draft: 1999: undrafted
- Playing career: 1999–2011
- Position: Shooting guard
- Coaching career: 2012–present

Career history

Playing
- 1999: Maccabi Rishon
- 1999–2000: Fort Wayne Fury
- 2000: Grand Rapids Hoops
- 2000: BCJ Hamburg
- 2000–2001: Roanoke Dazzle
- 2002–2003: Roche-St Etienne
- 2003: Reims
- 2003–2004: Etendard Brest
- 2004: ESPE Basket Châlons-en-Champagne
- 2004–2006: GET Vosges
- 2006–2007: Townsville Crocodiles
- 2007: Hermine Nantes Basket
- 2007–2008: Universitet Yugra Surgut
- 2008: Trikala Aries B.C.
- 2010: London Lions
- 2011: ADA Blois

Coaching
- 2012–2013: La Salle College Prep
- 2015–2016: Bristol
- 2016–2017: Duarte HS
- 2017–2018: Blair HS
- 2018–2019: South Hills HS

Career highlights
- McDonald's All-American (1994); Second-team Parade All-American (1994); California Mr. Basketball (1994)

Jelani Akil Gardner (born December 26, 1975) is an American-French basketball coach and former professional player. He is 1.98 m (6 ft 6 in) in height. He played mainly at the shooting guard position, but also at the point guard and small forward positions. He played with the Milton Keynes Lions Basketball Club until he was released in January 2011.

== College career ==
After playing high school basketball at St. John Bosco High School in Bellflower, California, Gardner played college basketball at the University of California. However, when his parents became disenchanted with their son's lack of playing time, they revealed to the NCAA that Todd Bozeman, Cal's head coach, had paid them about $30,000 over a two-year period so his parents could attend Jelani's games.

After the scandal broke, Gardner transferred to Pepperdine. Bozeman was ultimately forced to resign and effectively blackballed from the college ranks until 2005, and Cal was forced to forfeit every game in which Gardner played (the entire 1994–95 season and all but two games of the 1995–96 season).

== Professional career ==
A blood test as part of a pre-NBA draft physical examination in 1995 revealed that Gardner had kidney disease, further hurting his NBA Draft stock.

Gardner played professionally with clubs such as Maccabi Rishon, the Grand Rapids Hoops, the Fort Wayne Fury, the Hamburg Tigers, the Roanoke Dazzle, Reims, Krka Novo Mesto, ESPE Basket Châlons-en-Champagne, AS Golbey-Epinal, Universitet Yugra Surgut, Trikala 2000 in his professional career.

Finally, in 2002, after playing with kidney disease for 7 years, Gardner reached the critical stage of his condition and received a kidney transplant from his mother that year.
