= Jerod Ward =

American former professional basketball player

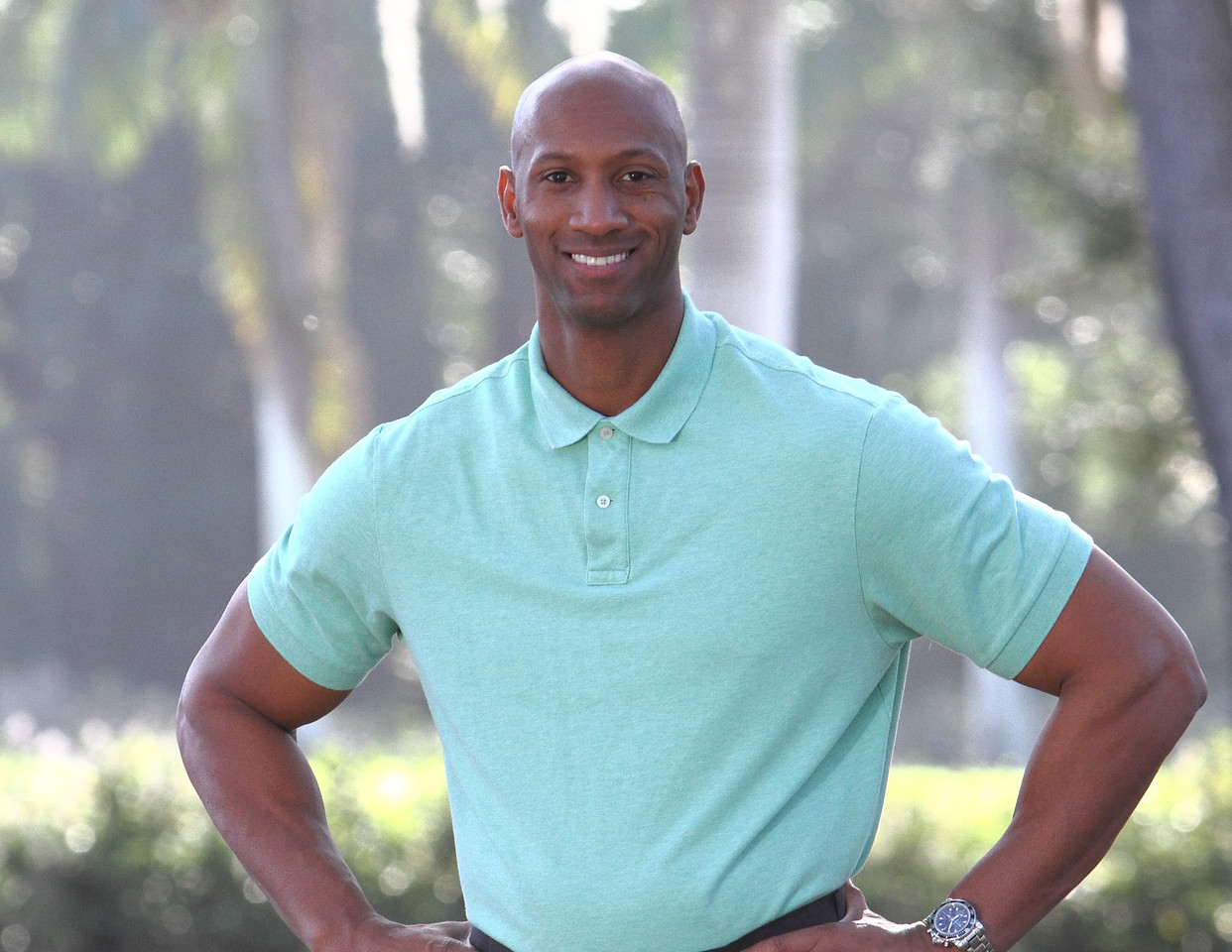

Personal information
- Born: May 5, 1976 (age 50) Jackson, Mississippi, U.S.
- Listed height: 6 ft 9 in (2.06 m)
- Listed weight: 235.4 lb (107 kg)

Career information
- High school: Clinton (Clinton, Mississippi)
- College: Michigan (1994–1998)
- NBA draft: 1998: undrafted
- Playing career: 1998–2011
- Position: Power forward / center
- Number: 32, 7, 20, 15, 3

Career history
- 1998–1999: Grand Rapids Hoops
- 1999–2000: Richmond Rhythm
- 2000–2001: Los Angeles Stars
- 2001: Mobiline Phone Pals
- 2001–2002: Granada
- 2002: Cibona Zagreb
- 2002–2003: Granada
- 2003–2004: Café Najjar
- 2004: JA Vichy
- 2004–2005: Jeonju KCC Egis
- 2005–2006: RB Montecatini Terme
- 2006: Sagesse Beirut
- 2007–2008: Shanghai Sharks
- 2009: Toyama Grouses
- 2009: Toros de Aragua
- 2009–2011: Fundación Adepal Alcázar

Career highlights
- CBA All-Rookie Team (1999); NIT champion (1997); McDonald's All-American (1994); Naismith Prep Player of the Year (1994); First-team Parade All-American (1994); * Later vacated

Jerod Davanta Ward (born May 5, 1976) is an American former professional basketball player, who played shooting guard, small forward, power forward and center positions. Currently, Ward is a TEDx & Motivational Keynote Speaker, Consultant, Coach and College Basketball Analyst for networks including ESPN, Fox Sports and Spectrum Sports.

== High school ==
Ward was the number one recruit in the nation winning the Naismith Prep Player of the Year award coming out of Clinton, Mississippi in 1994. The 1994 McDonald's All-American, First Team Parade & Slam magazine, USA Today, Basketball Times All-American scored 2,652 points with more than 800 rebounds in three varsity seasons at Clinton High School. As a senior, Ward averaged 29.8 points and 10.3 rebounds per game for the 26–3 Arrows. He posted 51 & 49 points games along with a 19-rebound game in his senior year campaign. As a junior, Ward averaged 29.5 points and 9.3 rebounds while leading Clinton Arrows to the Class 5A state championship, averaging 33.5 points in the state tournament. As a sophomore, Ward averaged 27.5 points and 9.5 rebounds. He was coached by Joel Boone. In the 2009–10 season Ward was honored by Clinton High School retiring his number 32 jersey.

== College career ==
In 1994, Ward signed with the University of Michigan and comprised part of its highly touted Fab Five II that included Travis Conlan, Maceo Baston, Willie Mitchell, and Maurice Taylor. Though plagued by injuries at Michigan, Ward ranked fifth in career three-point field goals.

== Professional career ==
The six foot nine inch, 235 lbs forward has played for the Grand Rapids Hoops of the CBA, In 1998–99, he averaged 14.9 points and 5.9 rebounds per game and was named to the CBA All-Rookie team. He also played for CB Granada in Spain, Cibona Zagreb (Croatia) and was part of the Toronto Raptors training camp in 2002.
