= Parade All-America Boys Basketball Team =

Defunct basketball award

The Parade All-America Boys Basketball Team was an annual selection by Parade that nationally honored the top high school boys' basketball players in the United States. It was part of the Parade All-American series that originated with boys basketball before branching to other sports. Started by the Sunday magazine in 1957, it had been the longest ongoing selection of high school basketball All-Americans in the country at the time of its final selections in 2015. Many of the honorees went on to star as college and professional basketball players. As of March 2011, there were 162 Parade All-Americans playing in the National Basketball Association (NBA).

At its onset, the selections were handled by a New York–based public relations firm, Publicity Enterprises, which was led by Haskell Cohen, who was a former sportswriter as well as the publicity director for the NBA at the time (1950–1969). The first All-America team in 1957 consisted of three five-player teams, and the first-team selections appeared on television on The Steve Allen Show. The following year, 20 players were selected and participated in the first annual Parade All-American high school game. The list later expanded to 40 of the nation's top players, divided into four teams of 10 each. Kareem Abdul-Jabbar, known then as Lew Alcindor, became the first sophomore in 1963 to be named a Parade All-American. Fifteen years later, Earl Jones became the next sophomore to earn first-team honors, and subsequently joined Abdul-Jabbar as the first two players to be named to the first team on three occasions. "It was a real thrill for me to make it on the Parade list early, when I was just a sophomore. The recognition is a great thing for kids to shoot for," said Abdul-Jabbar as part of the announcement for the 2000 team.

Starting in 2011, the selections were compiled in conjunction with Sporting News and their writer, Brian McLaughlin. Candidates also began to be limited to players in their senior year. The selections went to a single-team format in 2012, and the size was reduced from 40- to a 20-player first team in 2014. McLaughlin described the selections as mostly Division I college-bound players that had a stellar senior year in high school. Additionally, Parade differentiated itself from most other All-American teams by not focusing solely on a player's standing among college recruiters. For example, some selectors might choose top recruits that had been injured much of their senior year. Parade discontinued its boys' basketball All-America selections after 2015.

== Selections ==
=== 1957–1959 ===
Season	First team		Second team		Third team		Fourth team		Ref
Season	Player	High school	Player	High school	Player	High school	Player	High school	Ref
1957	Terry Bethel	Collinsville (Collinsville, Ill.)	Charles Brandt	Elgin (Elgin, Ill.)	Bobby Lee Slusher	Lone Jack (Four Miles, Ky.)	None selected		
1957	Tom Meschery	Lowell (San Francisco, Calif.)	Tom Stith	St. Francis (Brooklyn, N.Y.)	Johnny Kelso	Central (Fort Wayne, Ind.)	None selected		
1957	Jerry Lucas	Middletown (Middletown, Ohio)	Bill McGill	Jefferson (Los Angeles, Calif.)	Bjarne Jensen	Franklin (Portland, Ore.)	None selected		
1957	Al Butler	East (Rochester, N.Y.)	John Tidwell	Herrin Township (Herrin Township, Ill.)	Kay McFarland	Englewood (Englewood, Col.)	None selected		
1957	Tony Jackson	Thomas Jefferson (Brooklyn, N.Y.)	John Egan	Weaver (Hartford, Conn)	Bob Heffner	Allentown (Allentown, Pa.)	None selected		
1958	Bill McGill	Jefferson (Los Angeles, Calif.)	Norman Grow	Foley (Foley, Minn).	Wiliam LeFevre	Phillip Shuyler (Albany, Pa.)	Armand Reo	Catholic Central (Troy, N.Y.)	
1958	Sandy Pomerantz	University City (St. Louis, Mo.)	Terry Dischinger	Garfield (Terre Haute, Ind.)	Charles Hall	Gerstmeyer (Terre Haute, Ind.)	George Friedrich	Delhaas (Bristol, Pa.)	
1958	Jerry Lucas	Middletown (Middletown, Ohio)	Wayne Hightower	Overbrook (Philadelphia, Pa.)	Ralph Richardson	Russell Springs (Russell Springs, Ky.)	John Rudometkin	Santa Maria (Santa Maria, Calif.)	
1958	John Kelso	Fort Wayne Central (Fort Wayne, Ind.)	Doug Mills	Galesburg (Galesburg, Ill.)	Frank Pinchback	Christian Brothers Academy (Albany, N. Y.)	Dave DeBusschere	Austin (Detroit, Michigan)	
1958	John Foley	Assumption (Worcester, Mass.)	Robert McLoughlon	St. Joseph (West New York, N. J.)	Willis Thomas	Jefferson (Los Angeles, Ca.)	Tom Sizer	Middleton (Middleton, Ohio)	
1959	James Robinson	Crane Tech (Chicago, Ill.)	Matt Szykowny	North Catholic (Pittsburgh, Pa.)	Rodney Thorn	Princeton (Princeton, W Va.)	Bob Sommers	San Marino (San Marino, Ca.)	
1959	Art Heyman	Oceanside (Oceanside, N.Y.)	Ralph Heyward	Overbrook (Philadelphia, Pa.)	Roger Brown	Wingate (Brooklyn, N.Y.)	Pat Richter	Madison East (Madison, Wis.)	
1959	Tom Hoover	Archbishop Carroll (Washington D. C.)	Gordon Martin	Hawthorne (Los Angeles, Ca.)	George Wilson	Marshall (Chicago, Ill.)	Billy Galanti	James Madison (Brooklyn, N.Y.)	
1959	Bill Raftery	St. Cecilia's (Kearny, N. J.)	Lawrence "Bumpy" Nixon	Galesburg (Galesburg, Ill.)	Vinnie Ernst	St. Aloysius (Jersey City, N. J.)	Jimmy Rayl	Kokomo (Kokomo, Ind.)	
1959	Bernie Butts	Hialeah (Hialeah, Fla.)	Tom Bolyard	Fort Wayne South (Fort Wayne, Ind.)	Jim Chacko	Carleroi (Charleoi, Pa.)	Don Burks	Archbishop Molloy (Jamaica, N.Y.)	

=== 1960–1969 ===
Season	First team		Second team		Third team		Fourth team		Ref
Season	Player	High school	Player	High school	Player	High school	Player	High school	Ref
1960	Ron Bonham	Muncie Central IN	Bill Bradley	Crystal City MO	Roger Brown	Brooklyn Wingate NY	Tom Baxley	North Miami FL	
1960	Connie Hawkins	Brooklyn Boys NY	Joe Caldwell	Los Angeles Fremont CA	Charles Hotetz	Greenwich CT	Buster Briley	Madison IN	
1960	Barry Kramer	Schenectady Linton NY	Art Roberts	Holyoke MA	Ricky Kaminsky	Bellaire TX	Bill Chmielewski	Detroit Holy Redeemer MI	
1960	Jeff Mullins	Lexington Lafayette KY	Paul Silas	Oakland McClymonds CA	Cotton Nash	Lake Charles LA	Bill Maphis	Romney WV	
1960	George Wilson	Chicago Marshall IL	John Thompson	Washington Carroll DC	Lawrence Nixon	Galesburg IL	Ron Smith	Camden NJ	
1961	Bill Bradley	Crystal City MO	Freddie Goss	Compton CA	Danny Farrell	Logansport IN	Luther Harper	Phoenix Union AZ	
1961	Reggie Harding	Detroit Eastern MI	Brent Kichting	Sharon Hills PA	George Lee	Trenton Central NJ	Fred Hetzel	Bethesda Landon MD	
1961	Jim Jarvis	Roseburg OR	Don Rolfes	Harrison OH	Skip Thoren	Rockford East IL	Dave Hicks	New Haven Wilbur Cross CT	
1961	Ron Krick	West Reading PA	L. C. Snow	Dayton Roosevelt OH	Dick Van Arsdale	Indianapolis Manual IN	Larry Sheffield	Troy LaSalle NY	
1961	Bryan Williams	Danville Schlarman IL	Haskell Tison	Geneva IL	Tom Van Arsdale	Indianapolis Manual IN	Marv Van Leeuwen	Canajoharie NY	
1962	John Austin	Hyattsville DeMatha MD	Henry Burlong	Dayton Roosevelt OH	Bob Bruggers	Danube MN	Larry Enos	Corvallis OR	
1962	Larry Conley	Ashland KY	Ed Griffin	Hartford Public CT	Myron Erickson	Orland CA	Ron Fahnstock	Seattle Roosevelt WA	
1962	Edgar Lacy	Los Angeles (Jefferson CA)	Tony Horton	Los Angeles University CA	Wilson Graham	Cleveland East Tech OH	Cazzie Russell	Chicago Carver IL	
1962	Jim Ligon	Kokomo IN	Riney Lochmann	Wichita North KS	Darrell Hardy	Houston Jefferson Davis TX	John Serbin	Hammond IN	
1962	Mike Silliman	Louisville St. Xavier KY	Bob McIntyre	New York City Holy Cross NY	Gary Keller	St. Petersburg Hollins FL	Jim Williams	Norristown PA	
1963 (Note: A fifth team was selected, not shown here)	Edgar Lacey	Jefferson (Los Angeles, CA)	James Cummins	Cedar Rapids (Cedar Rapids, IA)	Bob Stuckey	Gilroy Union (Gilroy, CA)	Bill Soens	William Penn Charter (Philadelphia, PA)	
1963	Ronald Sepic	Uniontown (Uniontown, PA)	Paul Presthus	Rugby (Rugby, ND)	Vaughn Harper	Boys' (Brooklyn, NY)	Ed Hummer	Washington-Lee (Arlington, VA)	
1963	Lew Alcindor	Power Memorial Academy (New York, NY)	Robert King	Westfield (Westfield, NJ)	Nick Pino	St. Michael's (Santa Fe, NM)	Tom Niemeier	Rex Mundi (Evansville, IN)	
1963	Ian Morrison	St. Petersburg (St. Petersburg, FL)	Charles Coleman	Darby-Colwyn (Darby, PA)	Fred Hare	Omaha Tech (Omaha, NE)	Mike Gervasoni	Bishop O'Dowd (Oakland CA)	
1963	Bobby Lewis	St. John's College (Washington DC)	Mike Redd	Seneca (Louisville, KY)	Doug Hice	Cathedral (Trenton, NJ)	Doug Wardlaw	Wilbur L. Cross (New Haven, CT)	
1964	Wes Unseld	Seneca (Louisville, KY)	Rich Jones	Lester (Memphis, TN)	Glinder Torain	Central (Muncie, IN)	Bill Hosket Jr.	Belmont (Dayton, OH)	
1964	Mike Lewis	Missoula (Missoula, MT)	Rodger Bohnenstiehl	Collinsville (Collinsville, IL)	Don Chaney	McKinley (Baton Rouge, LA)	Ken Spain	Austin (Houston TX)	
1964	Lew Alcindor	Power Memorial Academy (New York, NY)	Butch Booker	Darby-Colwyn (Darby, PA)	Dave Newmark	Abraham Lincoln (Brooklyn, NY)	Manny Leaks	East (Cleveland OH)	
1964	Larry Miller	Catasauqua (Catasauqua, PA)	Ron Williams	Weirton (Weirton, WV)	Brendan McCarthy	DeMatha (Hyattsville, MD)	Jim Phillips	Bishop Barry (St. Petersburg, FL)	
1964	Jerry Sharman	Charter Oak (Charter Oak, CA)	Jack Bettridge	Power Memorial Academy (New York, NY)	Bob Tallent	Maytown (Maytown, KY)	Chris Ellis	Newport News (Newport News, VA)	
1965	Simmie Hill	Midlan (Midland, PA)	L. C. Bowen	Benton Harbor (Benton Harbor, MI)	Bernie Williams	DeMatha (Hyattsville, MD)	Dick Haucke	La Salle (Cincinnati, OH)	
1965	Don Ross	East (Waterloo, IA)	Howard Arndt	Republic (Republic, MO)	Walt Esdaile	Hillhouse (New Haven, CT)	Steve Vandenberg	Allegany (Cumberland, MD)	
1965	Lew Alcindor	Power Memorial Academy (New York, NY)	Melvin Bell	Clinton (Clinton, OK)	Sam Robinson	Jefferson (Los Angeles, CA)	Ted Wierman	Davis (Davis, WA)	
1965	Pete Maravich	Needham Broughton (Raleigh, NC)	Lucius Allen	Wyandotte (Kansas City, KS)	Dave Golden	Pekin (Pekin, IL)	Alan Goldfarb	Miami Beach (Miami Beach, FL)	
1965	Richard Braucher	Kutztown (Kutztown, PA)	Butch Beard	Breckinridge County (Hardinsburg, KY)	Charles Powell	McKinley (Baton Rouge, LA)	Larry Cannon	Abraham Lincoln (Philadelphia, PA)	
1966 (Note: Fifth and sixth teams were selected, not shown here)	Calvin Murphy	Norwalk (Norwalk, CT)	Perry Wallace	Pearl (Nashville, TN)	Mike Blevins	Springboro (Springboro, OH)	George Janky	St. Rita's (Chicago, IL)	
1966	Jim McMillian	Thomas Jefferson (Brooklyn, NY)	Richard Bradshaw	Marshall (Chicago, IL)	Doug Jackson	Shawnee Mission East (Shawnee Mission, KS)	Jerry Paluch	St. Mary's (Perth Amboy, NJ)	
1966	Joe Bergman	St. Mary's (Clinton, IA)	Bob Lienhard	Rice (New York, NY)	Sid Catlett	DeMatha (Hyattsville, MD)	Gregg Northington	Wood (Indianapolis, IN)	
1966	Sam Robinson	Jefferson (Los Angeles, CA)	Calvin Nicholson	Philip Schuyler (Albany, NY)	Nelson Isley	Reidsville (Reidsville, NC)	Eddie Fogler	Flushing (Flushing, NY)	
1966	Rick Mount	Lebanon (Lebanon, IN)	Pless Vann	Central (Tulsa, OK)	Marvin Winkler	Washington (Indianapolis, IN)	Jim Rose	Hazard (Hazard, KY)	
1967	Curtis Rowe	Fremont (Los Angeles, CA)	Ken Durrett	Schenley (Pittsburgh, PA)	Bart Johnson	Torrance (Torrance, CA)	Willie Long	South Side (Fort Wayne, IN)	
1967	Howard Porter	Booker (Sarasota, FL)	Craig Manwaring	Highland (Highland, IL)	Spencer Haywood	Pershing (Detroit, MI)	Lynn Howden	Waltrip (Houston, TX)	
1967	Jim McDaniels	Allen County (Allen County, KY)	Dana Lewis	Weequahic (Newark, NJ)	Artis Gilmore	Carver (Dothan, AL)	Gregg Northington	Wood (Indianapolis, IN)	
1967	Greg Starrick	Marion (Marion, IL)	Dana Pagett	El Segundo (El Segundo, CA)	Pierre Russell	Wyandotte (Kansas City, KS)	Austin Carr	Mackin (Washington DC)	
1967	Dick DeVenzio	Ambridge (Ambridge, PA)	Fred Hilton	McKinley (Baton Rouge, LA)	Dean Meminger	Rice (New York, NY)	Jim Rose	Hazard (Hazard. KY)	
1968	Dennis Wuycik	Ambridge (Ambridge, PA)	Tom Parker	Collinsville (Collinsville, IL)	Bob Zender	Edina (Edina, MN)	Chris Schweer	York (Elmhurst, IL)	
1968	Bob Ford	North (Evansville, IN)	James Speed	Valencia (Shreveport, LA)	Ron Riley	Jordan (Los Angeles, CA)	Cyril Baptiste	Archbishop Curley (Miami, FL)	
1968	Tom Riker	St. Dominic's (Oyster Bay, NY)	Steve Turner	Bartlett (Memphis, TN)	Ansley Truitt	Wilson (San Francisco, CA)	Bill Chamberlain	Long Island Lutheran (Brookville, NY)	
1968	Ralph Simpson	Pershing (Detroit, MI)	John Fraley	Middletown (Middletown, OH)	Phil Chenier	Berkeley (Berkeley, CA)	Billy Shepherd	Carmel (Carmel, IN)	
1968	Bob Kivisto	East (Aurora, IL)	Milton Horne	Philip Schuyler (Albany, NY)	Henry Bacon	Male (Louisville KY)	Joby Wright	Johnson (Savannah, GA)	
1969	George McGinnis	Washington (Indianapolis, IN)	Mel Davis	Boys' (Brooklyn, NY)	Jim Horne	Philip Schuyler (Albany, NY)	Mike Fink	Central Valley (Central Valley, CA)	
1969	Johnny Neumann	Overton (Memphis, TN)	Jim Brewer	Proviso East (Maywood, IL)	Nick Weatherspoon	McKinley (Canton, OH)	Ernie Johnson	Ottawa Hills (Grand Rapids, MI)	
1969	Tom McMillen	Mansfield (Mansfield, PA)	Jim Chones	St. Catherine (Racine, WI)	Randy Canfield	Southeast (Wichita, KS)	Tom Payne	Shawnee (Louisville, KY)	
1969	Norm Stevenson	Gibbs (St. Petersburg, FL)	Allan Hornyak	St. John's (Bellaire, OH)	Dan Kirkland	Columbus (Columbus, GA)	Tyrone Collins	Kennedy (Paterson, NJ)	
1969	Kevin Joyce	Archbishop Molloy (Jamaica, NY)	Joe Wills	Vashon (St. Louis, MO)	Pete Harris	Dunbar (Baltimore, MD)	Walter Williams	Wyandotte (Kansas City, KS)	

=== 1970–1979 ===
Season	First team		Second team		Third team		Fourth team		Ref
Season	Player	High school	Player	High school	Player	High school	Player	High school	Ref
1970	Tom McMillen	Mansfield (Mansfield, PA)	Dwight Jones	Wheatley (Houston, TX)	Bill Morris	Beaumont (St. Louis, MO)	Keith Bowman	Savannah (Savannah, GA)	
1970	Bill Walton	Helix (La Mesa, CA)	Jim Bradley	Roosevelt (East Chicago, IN)	Donald Washington	St. Anthony's (Washington DC)	Hal Sullinger	Camden (Camden, NJ)	
1970	Kris Berymon	Harper (Chicago, IL)	Tommy Burleson	Avery County (Avery, NC)	Les Cason	East Rutherford (East Rutherford, NJ)	Danny Moses	Williamson (Williamson, WV)	
1970	John Williamson	Wilbur L. Cross (New Haven, CT)	James Outlaw	Ballard-Hudson (Ballard, GA)	Don Smith	Roth (Dayton, OH)	Jeff Walker	Central (Detroit, MI)	
1970	Tom Gilbert	Speedway (Indianapolis, IN)	Sam Puckett	Hales Franciscan (Chicago, IL)	Bill Anderson	Skyline (Salt Lake City, UT)	Denton Jones	Central (Knoxville, TN)	
1971 (Note: A fifth, sixth and seventh team were selected, not shown here)	Tom Roy	South Windsor (South Windsor, CT)	Rick Suttle	Assumption (East St. Louis, IL)	Kessem Grimes	West Side (Gary, Indiana)	Lindsay Hairston	Kettering (Detroit, MI)	
1971	Campy Russell	Central (Pontiac, MI)	Donald Washington	St. Anthony's (Washington, D.C.)	Owen Brown	Lyons (LaGrange, IL)	Carlos Mina	Central Union (El Centro, CA)	
1971	Les Cason	East Rutherford (East Rutherford, NJ)	David Vaughn	Cameron (Nashville, TN)	Ed Stahl	Walnut Ridge (Columbus, OH)	Fessor Leonard	Carver (Columbus, GA)	
1971	Andre McCarter	Overbrook (Philadelphia, PA)	Raymond Lewis	Verbum Dei (Los Angeles, CA)	Ricky Coleman	Schenley (Pittsburgh, PA)	Jimmy Dan Conner	Anderson County (Lawrenceburg, KY)	
1971	Mike Flynn	Jeffersonville (Jeffersonville, IN)	Gus Williams	Mount Vernon (Mount Vernon, NY)	Ernie Douse	Boys (Brooklyn, NY)	Lloyd Walton	Mt. Carmel (Chicago, IL)	
1972	Major Jones	Desha Central; Rohwer, AR)	Casey Corliss	University West (Los Angeles, CA)	Phil Sellers	Jefferson (Brooklyn, NY)	None selected		
1972	Quinn Buckner	Thornridge (Dolton, IL)	John Engles	St. Peter's (Staten Island, NY)	Ira Terrell	Roosevelt (Dallas, TX)	None selected		
1972	Nino Samuel	Central (Salina, KS)	Jerry Thruston	Owensboro (Owensboro, KY)	Jeff Fosnes	Wheat Ridge (Wheat Ridge, CO)	None selected		
1972	Eugene Short	Hattiesburg (Hattiesburg, MS)	Ron Lee	Lexington (Lexington, MA)	Lamont Turner	Vashon (St. Louis, MO)	None selected		
1972	Ed Lawrence	Boston (Lake Charles, LA)	Greg Grady	Eastern District (Brooklyn, NY)	Merlin Wilson	St. Anthony's (Washington, D.C.)	None selected		
1972	Robert Parish	Woodlawn (Shreveport, LA)	Alvan Adams	Putnam City (War Acres, OK)	John Drew	Shields; Beatrice, AL)	None selected		
1972	Leon Douglas	Leighton (Leighton, AL)	Mo Howard	St. Joseph's Prep (Philadelphia, PA)	Bill Cook	White Station (Memphis, TN)	None selected		
1972	Walter Luckett	Kolbe (Bridgeport, CT)	Mickey Heard	Wilbur L. Cross (New Haven, CT)	Dave O'Connell	McNicholas (Cincinnati, OH)	None selected		
1972	Bubbles Hawkins	Pershing (Detroit, MI)	Eddie Owens	Wheatley (Houston, TX)	John Lucas	Hillside (Durham, NC)	None selected		
1972	Chuckie Williams	East (Columbus, OH)	Larry Fogle	Cooley (Detroit, MI)	Roger Powell	Central (Joliet, IL)	None selected		
1973	Bo Ellis	Parker (Chicago, IL)	Eddie Owens	Wheatley (Houston, TX)	Jeff Randall	Castlemont (Oakland, CA)	Bill Paterno	Christian Brothers Academy (Lincroft, NJ)	
1973	Richard Washington	Benson Tech (Portland, OR)	Wesley Cox	Male (Louisville, KY)	Ernie Grunfeld	Forest Hills (Forest Hills, NY)	Moses Malone	Petersburg (Petersburg, VA)	
1973	Cliff Pondexter	San Joaquin Memorial (Fresno, CA)	Gavin Smith	Van Nuys (Van Nuys, CA)	Bob Siegel	Fairbury (Fairbury, NE)	Walter Actwood	Greenville (Greenville, MS)	
1973	Adrian Dantley	DeMatha (Hyattsville, MD)	Jackie Robinson	Morningside (Inglewood, CA)	Bob Manker	Valley (West Des Moines, IA)	Herman Harris	Chester (Chester, PA)	
1973	Melvin Baker	Gallup (Gallup, NM)	Geoff Crompton	Williams (Burlington, NC)	Kent Benson	Chrysler (New Castle, IN)	Jeff Wilkins	Elgin (Elgin, IL)	
1973	Tom LaGarde	Central Catholic (Detroit, MI)	Lewis Brown	Verbum Dei (Los Angeles, CA)	Steve Puidokas	St. Laurence (Burbank, IL)	Donnie Von Moore	Kenwood (Chicago, IL)	
1973	T. R. Dunn	West End (Birmingham, AL)	Ernie Kent	West (Rockford, IL)	Jim Webb	Adams (South Bend, IN)	David Moss	Ringgold (Ringgold, GA)	
1973	Jim Spillane	Palos Verdes (Palos Verdes, CA)	Jeep Kelley	Schenley (Pittsburgh, PA)	John Kuester	Benedictine (Richmond, VA)	Marty Giovacchini	Judge Memorial (Salt Lake City, UT)	
1973	Wayne Smalls	Camden (Camden, NJ)	Dexter Reed	Parkview (Little Rock, AR)	Jim Smith	Lake Worth (Lake Worth, FL)	Wayne Golden	Shawnee (Louisville, KY)	
1973	Larry Wright	Western (Washington, D.C.)	Joe Hassett	La Salle Academy (Providence, RI)	Brian Williams	South (Columbus, OH)	Ray Martin	Mater Christi (Astoria, NY)	
1974	Moses Malone	Petersburg (Petersburg, VA)	Mark Olberding	Melrose (Melrose, MN)	Myles Patrick	Southwest (Macon, GA)	Darryl Dawkins	Evans (Orlando, FL)	
1974	Mike Mitchell	Price (Atlanta, GA)	Bruce Campbell	Wilbur L. Cross (New Haven, CT)	Jack Givens	Bryan Station (Lexington, KY)	Winford Boynes	Capitol Hill (Oklahoma City, OK)	
1974	Audie Matthews	Bloom Township (Chicago Heights, IL)	Jacky Dorsey	Archer (Atlanta, GA)	Rick Robey	Brother Martin (New Orleans, LA)	Kim Stewart	Ballard (Seattle, WA)	
1974	Earl Evans	Lincoln (Port Arthur, TX)	Billy Lewis	Farragut (Chicago, IL)	Dave Winey	St. John's Prep (Danvers, MA)	Lawrence Boston	Kennedy (Cleveland, OH)	
1974	Kenny Carr	DeMatha (Hyattsville, MD)	Chris Patton	St. Francis (Athol Springs, NY)	Bill Cartwright	Elk Grove (Elk Grove, CA)	Lucius Foster	Savannah (Savannah, GA)	
1974	Brett Vroman	Provo (Provo, UT)	Tony Smith	Saginaw (Saginaw, MI)	Dave Batton	Springfield (Springfield, PA)	Chad Nelson	Yankton (Yankton, SD)	
1974	Phil Ford	Rocky Mount (Rocky Mount, NC)	Kenny Higgs	Owensboro (Owensboro, KY)	Tony Flannagan	Southwest (Atlanta, PA)	Jack Gilloon	Memorial (West New York, NJ)	
1974	Mark Wulfemeyer	Troy (Fullerton, CA)	Steve Collier	Southwestern (Hanover, IN)	Brad Davis	Monaca (Monaca, PA)	Wayne Bracy	Hayes (Birmingham, AL)	
1974	Skip Wise	Dunbar (Baltimore, MD)	James Jackson	Crane Tech (Chicago, IL)	Duck Williams	Mackin (Washington, D.C.)	Gary Rosenberger	Marquette (Milwaukee, WI)	
1974	Stan Rome	Valdosta (Valdosta, GA)	John Gunn	Melrose (Memphis, TN)	Al Green	Maine Central Institute (Pittsfield, ME)	Alex Eldridge	Taft (Bronx, NY)	
1975	Bill Cartwright	Elk Grove (Elk Grove, CA)	Larry Gibson	Dunbar (Baltimore, MD)	Ron Perry	Catholic Memorial (West Roxbury, MA)	Larry Harrison	Towson Catholic (Baltimore, MD)	
1975	David Greenwood	Verbum Dei (Los Angeles, CA)	Sam Drummer	Muncie North (Muncie, Indiana)	Pete Boesen	Maine South (Park Ridge, IL)	Jay Feltz	Monongah (Monongah, WV)	
1975	Kyle Macy	Peru (Peru, IN)	Stacey Robinson	Crossland (Camp Springs, MD)	Wayne McKoy	Long Island Lutheran (Brookville, NY)	Mike Palma	St. Agnes (Rockville Centre, NY)	
1975	Bill Willoughby	Dwight Morrow (Englewood, NJ)	Reggie King	Jackson-Olin (Birmingham, AL)	Brad Holland	Crescenta Valley (La Crescenta, CA)	James Bradley	Melrose (Memphis, TN)	
1975	Roy Hamilton	Verbum Dei (Los Angeles, CA)	Glen Grunwald	East Leyden (Franklin Park, IL)	Jim Tillman	Eastern (Washington, D.C.)	Terry Crosby	DeVilbiss (Toledo, OH)	
1975	James Hardy	Jordan (Long Beach, CA)	Bob Bender	Bloomington (Bloomington, IL)	Chris Bennett	Catholic (Little Rock, AR)	Bernard Rencher	Mater Christi (Astoria, NY)	
1975	Bernard Toone	Gorton (Yonkers, NY)	Bill Laimbeer	Palos Verdes Estates (Palos Verdes, CA)	Jim Graziano	Farmingdale (Farmingdale, NY)	Pat Foschi	Virginia (Virginia, MN)	
1975	Darryl Dawkins	Evans (Orlando, FL)	Ernie Cobb	Stamford (Stamford, CT)	Larry Wilson	Central Lafourche (Mathews, LA)	Albert King	Fort Hamilton (Brooklyn, NY)	
1975	Bruce Flowers	Berkley (Berkley, MI)	Reggie Carter	Long Island Lutheran (Brookville, NY)	Bob Roma	Christian Bros Academy (Lincroft, NJ)	Mickey Crowe	J.F. Kennedy Prep (St. Nazianz, WI)	
1975	Winford Boynes	Capitol Hill (Oklahoma City, OK)	Lynbert Johnson	Haaren (New York, NY)	Rich Valavicius	Hammond (Hammond, IN)	Cedrick Hordges	Robert E. Lee (Montgomery, AL)	
1976	Gene Banks	West Philadelphia (Philadelphia, PA)	Jim Graziano	Farmingdale (Farmingdale, NY)	Charles Whitney	DeMatha (Washington, D.C.)	Johnny Parker	Central (St. Louis, MO)	
1976	Albert King	Fort Hamilton (Brooklyn, NY)	Mike O'Koren	Hudson Catholic (Jersey City, NJ)	James Wilkes	Dorsey (Los Angeles, CA)	Kiki VanDeWeghe	Palisades (Pacific Palisades, CA)	
1976	LaVon Williams	Manuel (Denver, CO)	Greg Johnson	Lockland (Cincinnati, OH)	Butch Carter	Middletown (Middletown, OH)	John Virgil	Elm City (Elm City, NC)	
1976	Glen Grunwald	East Leyden (Franklin Park, IL)	Stan Matzen	Lincoln (Tacoma, WA)	Antonio Martin	Arsenal Technical (Indianapolis, IN)	Albert Jones	Worthing (Houston, TX)	
1976	Stuart House	Denby (Detroit, MI)	Derek Holcomb	Richwoods (Peoria, IL)	Jawann Oldham	Cleveland (Seattle, WA)	Gig Sims	Redondo Beach (Redondo Beach, CA)	
1976	Rickey Brown	Southwest (Atlanta, GA)	Wayne McKoy	Long Island Lutheran (Brookville, NY)	LaVon Mercer	Metter (Metter, GA)	Larry Petty	Power Memorial (New York, NY)	
1976	Darrell Griffith	Male (Louisville, KY)	Jo Jo Hunter	Mackin (Washington, D.C.)	Jay Shidler	Lawrenceville (Lawrenceville, IL)	Bill Hanzlik	Beloit Memorial (Beloit, WI)	
1976	John Nash	Polytech (Long Beach, CA)	Brian Walker	Lebanon (Lebanon, IN)	Arnold Gaines	Lake Clifton (Baltimore, MD)	Tyrone Ladsdon	Carnarsie (Brooklyn, NY)	
1976	Ronnie Perry	Catholic Memorial (West Roxbury, MA)	James Daughtry	Berrien County (Nashville, GA)	Bob Turner	Male (Louisville, KY)	Baron Flenory	Valley (New Kensington, PA)	
1976	Rich Branning	Marina (Huntington Beach, CA)	Clyde Austin	Maggie Walker (Richmond, VA)	David Colescott	Marion (Marion, IN)	Lowes Moore	Mount Vernon (Mt. Vernon, NY)	
1977	Albert King	Fort Hamilton (Brooklyn, NY)	Bobby Cattage	J.O. Johnson (Huntsville, AL)	Gilberto Salinas	Burbank (San Antonio, TX)	Larry Petty	Power Memorial (New York, NY)	
1977	Gene Banks	West Philadelphia (Philadelphia, PA)	Jeff Ruland	Sachem (Lake Ronkonkoma, NY)	Pete Budko	Loyola (Towson, MD)	Brian Peterson	Prior Lake (Prior Lake, MN)	
1977	Earvin Johnson	Everett (Lansing, MI)	Danny Vranes	Skyline (Salt Lake City, UT)	Brian Allsmiller	Buffalo Grove (Buffalo Grove, IL)	Ray Tolbert	Madison Heights (Anderson, IN)	
1977	Wayne McKoy	Long Island Lutheran (Brookville, NY)	Steve Risley	Central (Lawrence, IN)	Kelly Tripucka	Bloomfield (Bloomfield, NJ)	Ken Matthews	Dunbar (Washington, D.C.)	
1977	Reggie Hannah	Titusville (Titusville, FL)	Eddie Johnson	Westinghouse (Chicago, IL)	Sam Clancy	Fifth Avenue (Pittsburgh, PA)	Wes Matthews	Warren Harding (Bridgeport, CT)	
1977	James Ratiff	Eastern (Washington, D.C.)	Oliver Lee	DeLand (DeLand, FL)	Tracy Jackson	Paint Branch (Burtonsville, MD)	Dwan Chandler	Main Central Institute (Boston, MA)	
1977	Herb Williams	Marion-Franklin (Columbus, OH)	Drake Morris	Washington (East Chicago, IN)	Felton Sealey	Don Bosco Prep (Boston, MA)	George Ratkovich	Alhambra (Alhambra, CA)	
1977	Al Wood	Jones County (Gray, GA)	Danny Ainge	North Eugene (Eugene, OR)	Willie Sims	Long Island City (Long Island City, NY)	James Crockett	Helena (Helena, AR)	
1977	Jeff Lamp	Ballard (Louisville, KY)	Tom Freeman	Lynwood (Lynwood, CA)	Greg Boyle	Mundelein (Mundelein, IL)	Wilbert Singleton	Sumter (Sumter, SC)	
1977	Darnell Valentine	Wichita Heights (Wichita, KS)	Wilmore Fowler	Palmetto (Palmetto, FL)	Ed Thurman	Lynn Classical (Lynn, MA)	Ken Page	McKee (Staten Island, NY)	
1978	Dwight Anderson	Roth (Dayton, OH)	Micah Blunt	East Jefferson (Metairie, LA)	Mark Aguirre	Westinghouse (Chicago, IL)	Thad Garner	Bishop Noll (Hammond, IN)	
1978	Greg Goorjian	Crescenta Valley (La Crescenta, CA)	Chris Brust	Babylon (Babylon, NY)	Lewis Card	Auburn (Auburn, AL)	Kevin Greaney	Nazareth (Brooklyn, NY)	
1978	Reggie Jackson	Roman Catholic (Philadelphia, PA)	Wallace Bryant	Emerson (Gary, IN)	Dwan Chandler	Maine Central (Pittsfield, MA)	Rick Harmon	Middle Township (Cape May, NJ)	
1978	Earl Jones	Mount Hope (Mount Hope, WV)	Darius Clemons	Phillips (Chicago, IL)	Ken McAlister	Oakland (Oakland, CA)	Gary Holmes	Central (Miami, FL)	
1978	Leonel Marquetti	Verbum Dei (Los Angeles, CA)	Jerry Eaves	Ballard (Louisville, KY)	Howard McNeill	Glassboro (Glassboro, NJ)	Anthony Lee	John Tyler (Tyler, TX)	
1978	Darryl Mitchell	North Shore (West Palm Beach, FL)	Tony Guy	Loyola (Towson, MD)	Guy Morgan	First Colonial (Virginia Bech, VA)	Dave Magley	LaSalle (South Bend, IN)	
1978	Corny Thompson	Middletown (Middletown, CT)	Derrick Hord	Tennessee (Bristol, TN)	Fred Roberts	Bingham (Riverton, UT)	Dean Marquardt	Washington (Milwaukee, WI)	
1978	Clarence Tillman	West Philadelphia (Philadelphia, PA)	Dan Larson	Ventura (Ventura, CA)	Walker Russell	Central (Pontiac, MI)	Raymond McCoy	Bloom (Chicago Heights, IL)	
1978	Landon Turner	Tech (Indianapolis, IN)	Vince Taylor	Tates Creek (Lexington, KY)	Mike Sanders	De Ridder (De Ridder, LA)	Scooter McCray	Mount Vernon (Mount Vernon, NY)	
1978	Terry White	Eastwood (El Paso, TX)	James Worthy	Ashbrook (Gastonia, NC)	Guy Williams	Bishop O'Dowd (Oakland, CA)	Dirk Minniefield	Lafayette (Lexington, KY)	
1979	Sam Bowie	Lebanon (Lebanon, PA)	Tim Andree	Brother Rice (Birmingham, MI)	Steve Bouchie	Washington (Washington, IN)	Jim Braddock	Baylor (Chattanooga, TN)	
1979	Derrick Hord	Tennessee (Bristol, TN)	Antoine Carr	Wichita Heights (Wichita, KS)	Howard Carter	Redemptorist (Baton Rouge, LA)	Randy Breuer	Lake City (Lake City, MN)	
1979	Earl Jones	Mount Hope (Mount Hope, WV)	Quintin Dailey	Cardinal Gibbons (Baltimore, MD)	Patrick Ewing	Rindge Latin (Cambridge, MA)	Tony Bruin	Mater Christi (Queens, NY)	
1979	Clark Kellogg	St. Joseph's (Cleveland, OH)	Darren Daye	Kennedy (Granada Hills, CA)	Terry Fair	Southwest (Macon, GA)	Mike Davis	Fayette County (Fayette, AL)	
1979	Ricky Ross	South (Wichita, KS)	Rod Foster	Aquinas (New Britain, CT)	Sidney Green	Jefferson (Brooklyn, NY)	Dale Ellis	Marietta (Marietta, GA)	
1979	Ralph Sampson	Harrisonburg (Harrisonburg, VA)	Teddy Grubbs	M.L. King (Chicago, IL)	Charles Hurt	Shelby County (Shelbyville, KY)	Michael Holton	Pasadena (Pasadena, CA)	
1979	Steve Stipanovich	DeSmet Jesuit (St. Louis, MO)	Greg Kite	Madison (Houston, TX)	Darrell Lockhart	Lee (Thomaston, GA)	Joe James	Rayen (Youngstown, OH)	
1979	Isiah Thomas	St. Joseph's (Westchester, IL)	Raymond McCoy	Bloom Township (Chicago Heights, IL)	John Paxson	Alter (Kettering, OH)	Paul Little	Latin (Boston, MA)	
1979	Dominique Wilkins	Washington (Washington, NC)	Dirk Minniefield	Lafayette (Lexington, KY)	Rob Williams	Milby (Houston, TX)	Rodney McCray	Mount Vernon (Mount Vernon, NY)	
1979	James Worthy	Ashbrook (Gastonia, NC)	Charlie Sitton	McMinnville (McMinnville, OR)	Leon Wood	Saint Monica (Saint Monica, CA)	Byron Scott	Morningside (Inglewood, CA)	

=== 1980–1989 ===
Season	First team		Second team		Third team		Fourth team		Ref
Season	Player	High school	Player	High school	Player	High school	Player	High school	Ref
1980	Russell Cross	Manley	James Banks	Hoke Smith	Donnell Allen	Murrah	Anthony Brown	Oak Hill Academy	
1980	Patrick Ewing	Rindge & Latin	Bret Bearup	Harborfields	Mike Brooks	Melrose	Freddie Brown	Adlai E. Stevenson	
1980	Vern Fleming	Mater Christi	Clarke Bynum	Wilson Hall Academy	Manuel Forrest	Moore	Tony Costner	Overbrook	
1980	Derek Harper	North Shore	Matt Doherty	Holy Trinity Diocesan	Dean Hopson	Huron	Greg Dreiling	Kapaun Mt. Carmel	
1980	Ralph Jackson	Inglewood	Kenny Fields	Verbum Dei	Ray Jones	Union	Carl Hill	Princeton Day	
1980	Earl Jones	Spingarn	Joe Kleine	Slater	Mike LaFave	Scecina Memorial	Pete Holbert	W. T. Woodson	
1980	Sam Perkins	Shaker	Jim Master	Paul Harding	Leonard Mitchell	St. Martinville	Al Miller	Ballard	
1980	Doc Rivers	Proviso East	Tim McCormick	Clarkston	Clayton Olivier	Los Amigos	Tim O'Shea	Wayland	
1980	Charlie Sitton	McMinnville	Ken Perry	South Spencer (Reo, Indiana)	Jim Petersen	St. Louis Park	Tom Sluby	Gonzaga College HS	
1980	Gary Springer	Benjamin Franklin	Barry Spencer	Catholic Central	Mike Wacker	San Marcos	Ennis Whatley	Phillips	
1981	Walter Downing	Providence Catholic	Mark Acres	Palos Verdes	John Brownlee	Southwest	Jeff Adkins	Martinsville	
1981	Greg Dreiling	Kapaun Mt. Carmel	Bobby Lee Hurt	S. R. Butler	Gerald Crosby	Parker	Uwe Blab	Effingham	
1981	Patrick Ewing	Rindge & Latin	Dwayne Johnson	Mater Christi	Mandy Johnson	St. Anthony	Adrian Branch	DeMatha	
1981	John Flowers	South Side	Ken Johnson	La Jolla	Eugene McDowell	Dixie County	Greg Cavener	Parkview	
1981	Manuel Forrest	Moore	Bill Martin	McKinley	Nigel Miguel	Notre Dame	Jimmy Miller	Princeton	
1981	Stuart Gray	John F. Kennedy	Michael Payne	Quincy	Ken Patterson	Forest Hills	Buzz Peterson	Asheville	
1981	Anthony Jones	Dunbar	Jeff Robinson	Broad Ripple	Dwayne Polee	Manual Arts	Ed Pinckney	Adlai E. Stevenson	
1981	Michael Jordan	Laney	Aubrey Sherrod	Wichita Heights	Johnny Rogers	La Quinta	Blair Rasmussen	Auburn	
1981	Sam Vincent	Eastern	Eric Turner	Flint Central	Greg Stokes	Hamilton	Joe Ward	Griffin	
1981	Ennis Whatley	Phillips	Milt Wagner	Camden	Billy Thompson	Camden	Bill Wennington	Long Island Lutheran	
1982	Benoit Benjamin	Carroll	Ken Barlow	Cathedral	Winston Bennett	Male	Mark Alarie	Brophy Prep	
1982	Kerry Boagni	Junípero Serra (Gardena)	Mark Cline	Williamson	Johnny Dawkins	Mackin Catholic	Len Bias	Northwestern	
1982	Brad Daugherty	Charles D. Owen	Bruce Douglas	Quincy Senior	Pat Ford	Cass Tech	Dell Curry	Fort Defiance	
1982	Curtis Hunter	Southern	Mike Giomi	Newark	Roger Harden	Valparaiso	Willie Cutts	Bryant	
1982	Ernie Myers	St. Nicholas of Tolentine	Buck Johnson	Hayes	Eldridge Hudson	Carson	Bruce Dalrymple	St. Johnsbury	
1982	Harold Pressley	St. Bernard	Brad Lohaus	Greenway	Ron Kellogg	Northwest	Paul Jokisch	Brother Rice	
1982	Richard Rellford	Suncoast	Dwayne Washington	Boys and Girls	Dave Popson	Bishop O'Reilly	Tim Kempton	St. Dominic	
1982	Billy Thompson	Camden	David Wingate	Dunbar	Tom Sheehey	McQuaid Jesuit	Lloyd Moore	Clairton	
1982	Wayman Tisdale	Booker T. Washington	Rickie Winslow	Yates	Kenny Walker	Crawford County	Kerry Trotter	Creighton Prep	
1982	Efrem Winters	King College Prep	Steve Woodside	Parkrose	Chris Washburn	Hickory	Butch Wade	Tech	
1983	Winston Bennett	Male	Dallas Comegys	Roman Catholic	Tommy Amaker	W. T. Woodson	Curtis Aiken	Bennett	
1983	James Blackmon	Marion	Bruce Dalrymple	St. Johnsbury	Mark Cline	Williamson	Johnny Fort	Wallace	
1983	Tom Curry	Redemptorist	Corey Gaines	St. Bernard's	Frank Ford	Osceola Senior	Willie Glass	Atlantic City	
1983	Antoine Joubert	Southwestern	Keith Gatlin	Conley	Todd Meier	Lourdes	Michael Graham	Spingarn	
1983	Dave Popson	Bishop O'Reilly	Kenny Hutchinson	Martin Luther King	Martin Nessley	Whitehall-Yearling	Scott Hicks	Cathedral	
1983	Tom Sheehey	McQuaid Jesuit	Carl Pollard	Mountain View	Gerald Perry	Dreher	Harold Jensen	Trumbull	
1983	Dwayne Washington	Boys and Girls	Kenny Smith	Archbishop Molloy	Michael Rutledge	Bibb County	Terry Long	Hermitage	
1983	Reggie Williams	Dunbar	Michael Smith	Los Altos	Daryl Thomas	St. Joseph	Russell Pierre	North Babylon	
1983	Rickie Winslow	Yates	Barry Sumpter	Lovejoy	Lawrence West	Morse	Rico Washington	Benjamin Franklin	
1983	Joe Wolf	Kohler	Chris Washburn	Fork Union Military	Curtis Wilson	St. Vincent-St. Mary	Nikita Wilson	Leesville	
1984	Delray Brooks	Rogers	Matt Beeuwsaert	Mater Dei	Ed Davender	Boys & Girls	Mike Abram	Northside	
1984	Mike Brown	Dunbar	Duane Ferrell	Calvert Hall	Craig Jackson	Montbello	Derrick Chievous	Holy Cross	
1984	Gary Grant	McKinley	Danny Ferry	DeMatha	Cedric Jenkins	Terrell County	Herman Harried	Dunbar	
1984	Tony Kimbro	Seneca	Lowell Hamilton	Providence St. Mel	Tom Lewis	Mater Dei	Tyrone Jones	Dunbar	
1984	Al Lorenzen	John F. Kennedy	Jeff Lebo	Carlisle	Troy Lewis	Anderson	Wally Lancaster	Calvin Coolidge	
1984	Richard Madison	Northside	Derrick Lewis	Archbishop Carroll	Robert Lock	Reedley	Mitchell Lee	American	
1984	Danny Manning	Lawrence	Kevin Madden	Robert E. Lee	Craig McMillan	Cloverdale	Roger McClendon	Centennial	
1984	Charles Smith	Warren Harding	David Rivers	St. Anthony	Steve Miller	Henry Clay	Kenny Sanders	McKinley Tech	
1984	Chris Washburn	Laurinburg Institute	Chris Sandle	Long Beach Polytechnic	Kevin Strickland	North Surrey	Ranzino Smith	Chapel Hill	
1984	John Williams	Crenshaw	Kevin Walls	Camden	John Thompson	Brunswick	Leonard Taylor	St. Bernard	
1985	Danny Ferry	DeMatha	Steve Bucknall	Governor Dummer Academy	Lance Blanks	McCullough	Mike Christian	Mullen	
1985	Lowell Hamilton	Providence St. Mel	Rick Calloway	Withrow	David Butler	Calvin Coolidge	Terry Dozier	Dunbar	
1985	Tom Hammonds	Crestview	Ron Huery	Whitehaven	Jonathan Edwards	O. P. Walker	Terence Greene	Central	
1985	Tito Horford	Marian Christian	Tony Kimbro	Seneca	Ed Horton	Lanphier	Boo Harvey	Andrew Jackson	
1985	Mike Jones	Oak Hill Academy	Walker Lambiotte	Central	Jerome Lane	St. Vincent-St. Mary's	Fess Irvin	East Ascension	
1985	Jeff Lebo	Carlisle	Tom Lewis	Mater Dei	Toney Mack	Brandon	Darryl Prue	Dunbar	
1985	Kevin Madden	Robert E. Lee	Kenny Payne	Northeast Jones	Roy Marble	Beecher	Glen Rice	Northwestern	
1985	Terry Mills	Romulus	Pooh Richardson	Benjamin Franklin	Richard Morgan	Salem	Charles Shackleford	Kinston	
1985	J. R. Reid	Kempsville	Doug Roth	Karns	Jerry Pryor	Southeast Bulloch County	Anthony Sherrod	Jenkins County	
1985	Rod Strickland	Oak Hill Academy	Roland Shelton	Columbia	Dennis Scott	Flint Hill Prep	Rodney Walker	Cardinal Gibbons	
1985	Irving Thomas	Miami Carol City	Mark Stevenson	Roman Catholic	Trevor Wilson	Grover Cleveland	Doug West	Altoona	
1986	Dwayne Bryant	De La Salle	Nelison Anderson	Simeon	Sean Higgins	Fairfax	Alaa Abdelnaby	Bloomfield	
1986	Rex Chapman	Apollo	Barry Bekkedam	Archbishop Carroll	Ron Huery	Whitehaven	Pete Chilcutt	Tuscaloosa Academy	
1986	Lloyd Daniels	Andrew Jackson	Chris Brooks	Oak Hill Academy	Sam Jefferson	Flint Hill	Phil Henderson	Crete-Monee	
1986	Fess Irvin	East Ascension	Perry Carter	Gonzaga College HS	Treg Lee	St. Joseph	Shawn Kemp	Concord	
1986	Ricky Jones	Pendleton	Sylvester Gray	Bolton	Eric Manuel	Southwest	Andy Kennedy	Louisville	
1986	Marcus Liberty	Martin Luther King	Alonzo Mourning	Indian River	Derrick Miller	Bible Baptist	Jerrod Mustaf	DeMatha	
1986	Terry Mills	Romulus	Larry Rembert	Keith	Chris Munk	Riordan	King Rice	Binghamton	
1986	Anthony Pendleton	Northwestern	Dennis Scott	Flint Hill	James Munlyn	South Aiken	Keith Robinson	Grover Cleveland	
1986	J. R. Reid	Kempsville	Felton Spencer	Eastern	Brian Oliver	Wills	Dwayne Schintzius	Brandon	
1986	Rumeal Robinson	Rindge & Latin	Stephen Thompson	Crenshaw	Mark Randall	Cherry Creek	Larry Smith	Alton	
1986	LaBradford Smith	Bay City	Scott Williams	Glen A. Wilson	Brian Shorter	Simon Gratz	Mark Tillmon	Gonzaga College HS	
1987	Perry Carter	Maine Central Institute	Kenny Anderson	Archbishop Molloy	Richard Dumas	Booker T. Washington	Eric Anderson	St. Francis de Sales	
1987	LeRon Ellis	Mater Dei	Eli Brewster	Wehrle Memorial	Mark Georgeson	Marina	Vic Carstarphen	Camden	
1987	Larry Johnson	Skyline	John Crotty	Christian Brothers Academy	Christian Laettner	Nichols	Livingston Chatman	Kathleen	
1987	Marcus Liberty	Martin Luther King	Jay Edwards	Marion	Mike Maddox	Putnam City North	Chris Corchiani	Hialeah-Miami Lakes	
1987	Mark Macon	Buena Vista	Jerome Harmon	Lew Wallace	Bobby Martin	Atlantic City	Brian Garner	Booker T. Washington	
1987	Eric Manuel	Southwest	Sean Higgins	Fairfax	Jerrod Mustaf	DeMatha	Bill Heppner	Crystal Lake Central	
1987	Rodney Monroe	St. Maria Goretti	Chris Jackson	Gulfport	Billy Owens	Carlisle	Chris Jent	Sparta	
1987	Alonzo Mourning	Indian River	Shawn Kemp	Concord	John Pittman	Terry	Lyndon Jones	Marion	
1987	Dennis Scott	Flint Hill	Greg Koubek	Shenendehowa	Stanley Roberts	Lower Richland	César Portillo	Miami Senior	
1987	Brian Shorter	Oak Hill Academy	Treg Lee	St. Joseph	Everick Sullivan	Hillcrest	Doug Smith	Mackenzie	
1987	LaBradford Smith	Bay City	Chris Mills	Fairfax	David White	Boca Ciega	Elmore Spencer	Booker T. Washington	
1987	Anthony Tucker	McKinley Technical	King Rice	Binghamton	Brian Williams	Santa Monica	David Whitmore	St. Bernard	
1988	Kenny Anderson	Archbishop Molloy	Eric Anderson	St. Francis de Sales	Arron Bain	Flint Hill	Damon Bailey	Bedford-North Lawrence	
1988	LaPhonso Ellis	Lincoln	Milton Bell	John Marshall	Mark Baker	Dunbar	Harold Boudreaux	Cecilia	
1988	Chris Jackson	Gulfport	Christian Laettner	Nichols	Elmer Bennett	Bellaire	Antoine Davison	Collins	
1988	Jim Jackson	Macomber-Whitney	Don MacLean	Simi Valley	Todd Day	Hamilton	Jamal Faulkner	Christ the King	
1988	Shawn Kemp	Concord	Jerrod Mustaf	DeMatha	Marc Dowdell	Christian Brothers Academy	Robert Horry	Andalusia	
1988	Darrick Martin	St. Anthony	Anthony Peeler	Paseo	Litterial Green	Moss Point	Bobby Hurley	St. Anthony	
1988	Chris Mills	Fairfax	Stacey Poole	Forrest	Donald Hodge	Coolidge	Chris Jent	Sparta	
1988	Alonzo Mourning	Indian River	César Portillo	Miami Senior	Zan Mason	Westchester	Adam Keefe	Woodbridge	
1988	Billy Owens	Carlisle	Matt Steigenga	South Christian	Conrad McRae	Brooklyn Tech	Lee Mayberry	Will Rogers	
1988	Stanley Roberts	Lower Richland	Everick Sullivan	Hillcrest	Crawford Palmer	Washington Lee	Mike Peplowski	De La Salle	
1988	Malik Sealy	St. Nicholas of Tolentine	Robert Werdann	Archbishop Molloy	Chris Smith	Kolbe Cathedral	Orlando Vega	Oak Hill Academy	
1988	Kenny Williams	Northeastern	David Young	Greenville	Bryant Stith	Brunswick	Greg Woodward	McQuaid Jesuit	
1989	Kenny Anderson	Archbishop Molloy	Adrian Autry	St. Nicholas of Tolentine	Shawn Bradley	Emery County	Anthony Douglas	East	
1989	Arron Bain	Flint Hill Prep	Damon Bailey	Bedford-North Lawrence	Mitchell Butler	Oakwood	Mike Hughes	Peoria	
1989	Doug Edwards	Miami Senior	Darryl Barnes	Franklin K. Lane	Deryl Cunningham	St. Joseph	Lee Mayberry	Cheyenne East	
1989	Darrin Hancock	Griffin	Carroll Boudreaux	Cecilia	Travis Ford	Madisonville North Hopkins	Billy McCaffrey	Central Catholic	
1989	Allan Houston	Ballard	Jamie Brandon	Martin Luther King	Shaun Golden	Riverside	Eric Mobley	Salesian	
1989	Bobby Hurley	St. Anthony	Calvin Byrd	St. Joseph Notre Dame	Greg Graham	Warren Central	Dwayne Morton	Central	
1989	Jim Jackson	Macomber-Whitney	Jamal Faulkner	Christ the King	Orlando Lightfoot	Chattanooga	Lloyd Mumford	Lexington	
1989	Ed O'Bannon	Artesia	Michael Tate	Oxon Hill	Malcolm Mackey	Brainerd	Chris Reynolds	Peoria Central	
1989	Shaquille O'Neal	Robert G. Cole	Jeff Webster	Carl Albert	Zan Mason	Westchester	James Robinson	Murrah	
1989	Deon Thomas	Simeon	Matt Wenstrom	Mayde Creek	Conrad McRae	Brooklyn Tech	Tony Tolbert	St. Martin DePorres	

=== 1990–1999 ===
Season	First team		Second team		Third team		Fourth team		Ref
Season	Player	High school	Player	High school	Player	High school	Player	High school	Ref
1990	Damon Bailey	Bedford-North Lawrence	Travis Best	Springfield Central	Adrian Autry	St. Nicholas of Tolentine	Fred Burley	Douglass	
1990	Penny Hardaway	Treadwell	Shawn Bradley	Emery County	Lee Green	Cheshire Academy	Brandon Cole	Bloom	
1990	Darrin Hancock	Griffin	Jamie Brandon	Martin Luther King	Grant Hill	South Lakes	Jevon Crudup	Raytown	
1990	Alan Henderson	Brebeuf Prep	Anthony Cade	Oak Hill Academy	Antonio Lang	LeFlore	Anthony Harris	Danbury	
1990	Eric Montross	Lawrence North	Bill Curley	Duxbury	Greg Minor	Washington County	Rodrick Rhodes	St. Anthony	
1990	Dwayne Morton	Central	Jamal Mashburn	Cardinal Hayes	Rodney Rogers	Hillside	Jalen Rose	Southwestern	
1990	Ed O'Bannon	Artesia	Derrick Phelps	Christ the King	Michael Smith	Dunbar	Melvin Simon	Archbishop Shaw	
1990	Cherokee Parks	Marina	Brian Reese	St. Nicholas of Tolentine	Pat Sullivan	Bogota	Kendrick Warren	Thomas Jefferson	
1990	Clifford Rozier	Southeast	Khalid Reeves	Christ the King	Shon Tarver	Santa Clara	Jamie Watson	Fike	
1990	Chris Webber	Detroit Country Day	Luther Wright	Elizabeth	Rodney Zimmerman	Air Academy	Thomas Wyatt	East Aurora	
1991	Cory Alexander	Oak Hill Academy	Orlando Antigua	St. Raymond	Percy Eberhart	Clarke Central	Derrick Carroll	Eau Claire	
1991	Travis Best	Springfield Central	Ben Davis	Oak Hill Academy	Othella Harrington	Murrah	Anthony Harris	Danbury	
1991	James Forrest	Southside	Jimmy King	Plano East	Keith LeGree	Statesboro	Donyell Marshall	Reading	
1991	Alan Henderson	Brebeuf Prep	Voshon Lenard	Southwestern	Loren Meyer	Ruthven-Ayrshire	Al Segova	Auburn	
1991	Juwan Howard	Chicago Vocational	Erik Meek	San Pasqual Escondido	Calvin Rayford	Washington	Duane Simpkins	DeMatha	
1991	Jason Kidd	St. Joseph Notre Dame	Howard Nathan	Manual	David Vaughn	Whites Creek	Greg Simpson	Lima Senior	
1991	Tom Kleinschmidt	Gordon Tech	Rodrick Rhodes	St. Anthony	Jayson Walton	Justin F. Kimball	Duane Spencer	Walter L. Cohen	
1991	Cherokee Parks	Marina	Jalen Rose	Southwestern	Antonio Watson	Eastmoor	Andre Riddick	Bishop Loughlin Memorial	
1991	Glenn Robinson	Roosevelt	Glen Whisby	Brookhaven	Corliss Williamson	Russellville	Donald Williams	Garner	
1991	Chris Webber	Detroit Country Day	Sharone Wright	Southwest	Bubba Wilson	Stone County	Julian Winfield	Cardinal Ritter Prep	
1992	Donta Bright	Dunbar	Damon Flint	Woodward	Joey Beard	South Lakes	Tony Delk	Haywood	
1992	Othella Harrington	Murrah	Ronnie Henderson	Murrah	Percy Eberhart	Clarke Central	Jerald Honeycutt	Grambling Laboratory	
1992	Jason Kidd	St. Joseph Notre Dame	Richard Keene	Collinsville	Steve Edwards	Miami Country Day	Chris Kingsbury	Hamilton	
1992	Randy Livingston	Isidore Newman School	Felipe López	Rice	Michael Evans	Booker T. Washington	Jason Lawson	Olney	
1992	Martice Moore	Oak Hill Academy	Charles Macon	Michigan City	Sylvester Ford	Fairley	Kenyon Murray	Central	
1992	Rodrick Rhodes	St. Anthony	Darnell Robinson	Emery	Rashard Griffith	King College Prep	Charles O'Bannon	Artesia	
1992	Jerry Stackhouse	Oak Hill Academy	Greg Simpson	Lima Senior	Zendon Hamilton	Sewanhaka	Duane Simpkins	DeMatha	
1992	Carlos Strong	Cedar Shoals	Jacque Vaughn	John Muir	Chuck Kornegay	Southern Wayne	Duane Spencer	W. L. Cohen	
1992	Rasheed Wallace	Simon Gratz	John Wallace	Greece Athena	Walter McCarty	Harrison	Vandale Thomas	Lawrence County	
1992	Corliss Williamson	Russellville	Dontonio Wingfield	Westover	Serge Zwikker	Harker Preparatory School	DeJuan Wheat	Ballard	
1993	Bobby Crawford	Eisenhower	Joey Beard	South Lakes	Damon Flint	Woodward	Rayshard Allen	John B. Ehret	
1993	Ronnie Henderson	Murrah	Keith Booth	Dunbar	Kiwane Garris	Westinghouse Vocational	Marcus Camby	Hartford Public	
1993	Allen Iverson	Bethel	Rashard Griffith	King College Prep	Omm'A Givens	Aberdeen	Jeff Capel	South View	
1993	Randy Livingston	Isidore Newman School	Zendon Hamilton	Sewanhaka	Cedric Henderson	Memphis East	James Collins	Andrew Jackson	
1993	Felipe López	Rice	Jason Lawson	Olney	Jerald Honeycutt	Grambling Laboratory	Dan Earl	Shawnee	
1993	Charles O'Bannon	Artesia	Antonio McDyess	Quitman	Avondre Jones	Artesia	Sylvester Ford	Fairley	
1993	Jerry Stackhouse	Oak Hill Academy	Jason Osborne	Louisville Male	Jeff McInnis	Oak Hill Academy	Charles Gelatt	Chenango Valley	
1993	Jacque Vaughn	John Muir	Andrae Patterson	Cooper	Scot Pollard	Torrey Pines	Willie Mitchell	Pershing	
1993	Rasheed Wallace	Simon Gratz	Terrance Roberson	Buena Vista	Joe Smith	Maury	Jess Settles	Winfield-Mount Union	
1993	Dontonio Wingfield	Westover	Darnell Robinson	Emery	Lee Wilson	Waco	Jeff Sheppard	McIntosh	
1994	Kevin Garnett	Farragut Career Academy	Jelani Gardner	St. John Bosco	Ronnie Fields	Farragut Career Academy	Ishua Benjamin	Concord	
1994	Zendon Hamilton	Sewanhaka	LaMarr Greer	Middle Township	Danny Fortson	Shaler Area	Chauncey Billups	George Washington	
1994	Felipe López	Rice	Chris Herren	Durfree	Adonal Foyle	Hamilton Central School	Mark Blount	Oak Hill Academy	
1994	Corey Louis	Miami Northwestern	Raef LaFrentz	MFL Mar-Mac	Omm'A Givens	Aberdeen	Luther Clay	Maine Central Institute	
1994	Stephon Marbury	Abraham Lincoln	Trajan Langdon	East Anchorage	Charlie Miller	South Miami	Lester Earl	Glen Oaks	
1994	Ron Mercer	Oak Hill Academy	Willie Mitchell	Pershing	Norman Nolan	Dunbar	Prince Fowler	Western	
1994	Bryant Notree	Simeon Career Academy	Tyrone Nesby	Cairo	Curtis Staples	Oak Hill Academy	Tremaine Fowlkes	Crenshaw	
1994	Andrae Patterson	Cooper	Terrance Roberson	Buena Vista	Mo Taylor	Henry Ford	Derek Hood	Central	
1994	Antoine Walker	Mount Carmel	Tim Thomas	Paterson Catholic	Samaki Walker	Whitehall	Ricky Price	Carson	
1994	Jerod Ward	Clinton	Lorenzen Wright	Booker T. Washington	Jahidi White	Cardinal Ritter College Prep	Kellii Taylor	Archbishop Carroll	
1995	Shareef Abdur-Rahim	Joseph Wheeler	Chauncey Billups	George Washington	Courtney Alexander	Charles E. Jordan	Lucas Barnes	South Miami	
1995	Ryan Blackwell	Sutherland	Rasheed Brokenborough	University City	Gary Bell	Joliet Township	Kobe Bryant	Lower Merion	
1995	Vince Carter	Mainland	Louis Bullock	Laurel Baptist Academy	Mark Blount	Oak Hill Academy	Chris Carrawell	Cardinal Ritter College Prep	
1995	Kevin Garnett	Farragut Career Academy	Taymon Domzalski	New Mexico Military Institute	Lester Earl	Glen Oaks	Luther Clay	Maine Central Institute	
1995	Stephon Marbury	Abraham Lincoln	Shaheen Holloway	St. Patrick	Ronnie Fields	Farragut Career Academy	Schea Cotton	St. Thomas More Prep	
1995	Ron Mercer	Oak Hill Academy	Derek Hood	Central	Tim James	Miami Northwestern	Bobby Joe Evans	McKinney	
1995	Tim Thomas	Paterson Catholic	Randell Jackson	The Winchendon School	Jermaine O'Neal	Eau Claire	Michael Gill	Dunbar	
1995	Robert Traylor	Murray-Wright	BJ McKie	Irmo	Sam Okey	Cassville	Melvin Levett	Euclid	
1995	Wayne Turner	Beaver Country Day	Paul Pierce	Inglewood	God Shammgod	La Salle Academy	Ricky Moore	Westside	
1995	Albert White	Inkster	Terrance Roberson	Buena Vista	Kenny Thomas	Albuquerque	Tyrone Washington	Mississippi State	
1996	Mike Bibby	Shadow Mountain	Lucas Barnes	South Miami	Jerald Brown	Aldine (Houston)	Malik Allen	Shawnee	
1996	Kobe Bryant	Lower Merion	Shane Battier	Detroit Country Day School	Mike Chappell	Southfield-Lathrup	Mike Babul	North Attleboro	
1996	Mateen Cleaves	Flint Northern	Corey Benjamin	Fontana	Jaraan Cornell	Clay	Nick Bradford	Fayetteville	
1996	Schea Cotton	St. Thomas More Prep	Jason Collier	Catholic Central	Ramel Lloyd	Cardinal Hayes	Ronald Curry	Hampton	
1996	Lester Earl	Glen Oaks	Ed Cota	St. Thomas More Prep	Olujimi Mann	Santa Ana Valley	Anthony Dent	Calhoun County	
1996	Ronnie Fields	Farragut Career Academy	Devonaire Deas	Albany	Doc Robinson	Selma	Willie Dersch	Holy Cross	
1996	Jermaine O'Neal	Eau Claire	Richard Hamilton	Coatesville Area	Mike Robinson	Richwoods	Vassil Evtimov	Long Island Lutheran	
1996	Lamar Odom	St. Thomas Aquinas Prep	Charles Hathaway	Hillwood	Jermaine Walker	Blanche Ely	David Jackson	Wilson	
1996	Tim Thomas	Paterson Catholic	Shaheen Holloway	St. Patrick	Vincent Whitt	Dudley	Derrick Thomas	Booker T. Washington	
1996	Winfred Walton	Pershing	Stephen Jackson	Oak Hill Academy	Loren Woods	Cardinal Ritter College Prep	Mohamed Woni	Prospect Hill	
1997	Shane Battier	Detroit Country Day School	Marcus Griffin	Manual	William Avery	Westside	Myron Anthony	Fletcher	
1997	Elton Brand	Peekskill	Larry Hughes	Christian Brothers College	Kenny Brunner	Dominguez	Charlie Bell	Flint Southwestern Academy	
1997	Chris Burgess	Woodbridge	Ryan Humphrey	Booker T. Washington	Khalid El-Amin	North Community	Eric Chenowith	Villa Park	
1997	Baron Davis	Crossroads School	Britton Johnsen	Murray	Marcus Fizer	Arcadia	Jarron Collins	Harvard-Westlake School	
1997	Melvin Ely	Thornton Township	Jumaine Jones	Mitchell-Baker	Tony Harris	Memphis East	Jason Collins	Harvard-Westlake School	
1997	Dion Glover	Cedar Grove	Corey Maggette	Fenwick	Brendan Haywood	James B. Dudley	Greedy Daniels	Cohen	
1997	Tracy McGrady	Mt. Zion Christian Academy	Chris Owens	Duncanville	Mark Karcher	St. Frances Academy	Ricky Davis	Iowa	
1997	Lamar Odom	St. Thomas Aquinas Prep	Anthony Perry	St. Anthony	Chris Mihm	Westlake	Kenny Gregory	Independence	
1997	JaRon Rush	The Pembroke Hill School	Luke Recker	DeKalb	Max Owens	Mt. Zion Christian Academy	Terence Morris	Governor Thomas Johnson	
1997	Korleone Young	Hargrave Military Academy	Ron Artest	La Salle Academy	Estaban Weaver	Independence	Edmund Saunders	Holy Cross	
1998	Ronald Curry	Hampton	Keith Bogans	DeMatha Catholic	Carlos Boozer	Juneau-Douglas	Jonathan Bender	Picayune	
1998	Dan Gadzuric	The Governor's Academy	Jason Capel	Saint John's Catholic Prep	Jeff Boschee	Valley City	Sam Clancy Jr.	St. Edward	
1998	Al Harrington	St. Patrick	Cory Hightower	Mt. Zion Christian Academy	Rasual Butler	Roman Catholic High School for Boys	Jason Gardner	North Central	
1998	DerMarr Johnson	Maine Central Institute	Kevin Lyde	Oak Hill Academy	Ajou Deng	Milford Academy	Donnell Harvey	Randolph-Clay	
1998	Rashard Lewis	Alief Elsik	Corey Maggette	Fenwick	Keyon Dooling	Dillard	Richard Jefferson	Moon Valley	
1998	Joel Przybilla	Monticello	Mike Miller	Mitchell	Teddy Dupay	Mariner	Kris Lang	Hunter Huss	
1998	JaRon Rush	The Pembroke Hill School	Tayshaun Prince	Dominguez	Dane Fife	Clarkston	Danny Miller	Rancocas Valley Regional	
1998	Stromile Swift	Fair Park	Quentin Richardson	Whitney Young	Adam Harrington	Pioneer Valley	Brett Nelson	St. Albans	
1998	Vincent Yarbrough	Cleveland	Frankie Williams	Manual	Marvin Stone	Virgil I. Grissom	J. R. VanHoose	Paintsville	
1998	Korleone Young	Hargrave Military Academy	Ray Young	St. Joseph Notre Dame	B. B. Waldon	Kathleen	Doug Wrenn	O'Dea	
1999	Jonathan Bender	Picayune	Nick Collison	Iowa Falls	Samuel Dalembert	St. Patrick	Matt Bonner	Concord	
1999	LaVell Blanchard	Ann Arbor Pioneer	Brian Cook	Lincoln Community	Mike Dunleavy Jr.	Jesuit	Marcus Cox	Kolbe Cathedral	
1999	Keith Bogans	DeMatha Catholic	Jamal Crawford	Rainier Beach	Chuck Eidson	Pinewood Preparatory School	Marquis Daniels	Mt. Zion Christian Academy	
1999	Carlos Boozer	Juneau-Douglas	Jason Gardner	North Central	Alton Ford	Milby	Kevin Gaines	Clark	
1999	Joseph Forte	DeMatha Catholic	Casey Jacobsen	Glendora	Drew Gooden	El Cerrito	Rod Grizzard	Central Park Christian	
1999	Donnell Harvey	Randolph-Clay	Brett Nelson	St. Albans	Majestic Mapp	St. Raymond High School for Boys	Donnell Knight	Corona del Sol	
1999	DerMarr Johnson	Maine Central Institute	Jason Richardson	Arthur Hill	Jason Parker	Memorial	Stéphane Pelle	Mercersburg Academy	
1999	Marvin Stone	Virgil I. Grissom	Marcus Taylor	Waverly	Leon Smith	King College Prep	Kareem Rush	The Pembroke Hill School	
1999	Jay Williams	St. Joseph	Damien Wilkins	Dr. Phillips	Travis Watson	Oak Hill Academy	Marshall Williams	Vincent	

=== 2000–2009 ===
Season	First team		Second team		Third team		Fourth team		Ref
Season	Player	High school	Player	High school	Player	High school	Player	High school	Ref
2000	Omar Cook	Christ the King	Mario Austin	Sumter County	Nick Anderson	Louisiana State University Laboratory School	Cedrick Banks	Westinghouse Vocational	
2000	Chris Duhon	Salmen	Andre Barrett	Rice	Travon Bryant	Jordan	Brian Boddicker	Duncanville	
2000	Eddie Griffin	Roman Catholic High School for Boys	Andre Brown	Leo Catholic	Abdou Diame	Oak Hill Academy	Adam Boone	Minnetonka	
2000	Jerome Harper	Keenan	Taliek Brown	St. John's Preparatory School	Neil Fingleton	Holy Name Central Catholic	Cliff Hawkins	Oak Hill Academy	
2000	Jared Jeffries	Bloomington High School North	Tyson Chandler	Dominguez	Orien Greene	Gainesville	A. J. Moye	Westlake	
2000	Darius Miles	East St. Louis Senior	Eddy Curry	Thornwood	Hervé Lamizana	St. Patrick	Ricky Paulding	Renaissance	
2000	Zach Randolph	Marion	Alton Ford	Milby	Garner Meads	Bridgton Academy	Justin Reed	Provine	
2000	DeShawn Stevenson	Washington Union	Rolando Howell	Lower Richland	Darius Rice	Lanier	Luke Ridnour	Blaine	
2000	Marcus Taylor	Waverly	Imari Sawyer	King College Prep	Scooter Sherrill	West Rowan	Eddie Starks	Miami Northwest Christian Academy	
2000	Gerald Wallace	Childersburg	Dajuan Wagner	Camden	Kelvin Torbert	Northwestern	Marcus Toney-El	Seton Hall Prep	
2001	Kwame Brown	Glynn Academy	John Allen	Coatesville Area	Rashaad Carruth	Oak Hill Academy	Alan Anderson	De La Salle	
2001	Tyson Chandler	Dominguez	Cedric Bozeman	Mater Dei	Josh Childress	Mayfair	Travis Diener	Goodrich	
2001	Ousmane Cisse	St. Jude	T. J. Ford	Willowridge	Billy Edelin	Oak Hill Academy	Channing Frye	St. Mary's	
2001	Eddy Curry	Thornwood	Julius Hodge	St. Raymond	Raymond Felton	Latta	Quemont Greer	The Berkshire School	
2001	Gavin Ludgood	Clarksville High School (AR)	LeBron James	St. Vincent St. Mary	Carlos Hurt	Moore	Chuck Hayes	Modesto Christian	
2001	David Harrison	Brentwood Academy	Aaron Miles	Jefferson	Pierre Pierce	Westmont	Rashad McCants	New Hampton School	
2001	David Lee	Chaminade College Preparatory School	Shavlik Randolph	Broughton	Anthony Richardson	Leesville	Earnest Shelton	White Station	
2001	Rick Rickert	Duluth East	Wayne Simien	Leavenworth	Anthony Roberson	Saginaw (Saginaw, Mich.)	Chris Thomas	Pike	
2001	Kelvin Torbert	Northwestern	James White	Hargrave Military Academy	Jamal Sampson	Mater Dei	Levi Watkins	Montrose Christian School	
2001	Dajuan Wagner	Camden	Jawad Williams	St. Edward	Mo Williams	Murrah	Shelden Williams	Midwest	
2002	Carmelo Anthony	Oak Hill Academy	Hassan Adams	Westchester	Mahmoud Abdul-Awwel	Woodrow Wilson	Derrick Byars	Ridgeway	
2002	Chris Bosh	Lincoln	Kevin Bookout	Stroud	Rashad Anderson	Kathleen	Alexander Johnson	Dougherty Comprehensive	
2002	Paul Davis	Rochester	Torin Francis	Tabor Academy	Brad Buckman	Westlake	Jimmy McKinney	Vashon	
2002	Raymond Felton	Latta	Jason Fraser	Amityville Memorial	Evan Burns	Fairfax	Gerry McNamara	Bishop Hannan	
2002	LeBron James	St. Vincent St. Mary	Daniel Horton	Cedar Hill	DeAngelo Collins	Inglewood	Steve Novak	Brown Deer	
2002	Sean May	Bloomington North	Andre Iguodala	Lanphier	Travis Garrison	DeMatha Catholic	Curtis Sumpter	Bishop Loughlin Memorial	
2002	Rashad McCants	New Hampton School	Elijah Ingram	St. Anthony	Jeff Horner	Mason City	Michael Thompson	Providence Catholic	
2002	Shavlik Randolph	Broughton	Kendrick Perkins	Ozen	Leon Powe	Oakland Technical	C. J. Watson	Bishop Gorman	
2002	Anthony Roberson	Saginaw (Saginaw, Mich.)	JJ Redick	Cave Spring	Eric Williams	Wake Forest-Rolesville	John Winchester	Milford	
2002	Amar'e Stoudemire	Cypress Creek	Bracey Wright	The Colony	Antoine Wright	Lawrence Academy at Groton	Kennedy Winston	Blount	
2003	Shannon Brown	Proviso East	Trevor Ariza	Westchester	Aaron Brooks	Benjamin Franklin	Ronnie Brewer	Fayetteville	
2003	Brian Butch	Appleton West	Brandon Bass	Capitol	J. R. Giddens	John Marshall	Olu Famutimi	Flint Northwestern	
2003	Luol Deng	Blair Academy	Jackie Butler	Coastal Christian Academy	Mike Jones	Thayer Academy	Daniel Gibson	Jesse H. Jones	
2003	Ndudi Ebi	Westbury Christian School	Brandon Cotton	Saint Martin de Porres	Linas Kleiza	Montrose Christian School	Ivan Harris	Oak Hill Academy	
2003	Kris Humphries	Hopkins	Dion Harris	Redford	Régis Koundjia	Laurinburg Institute	Shaun Livingston	Peoria Central	
2003	LeBron James	St. Vincent St. Mary	Ekene Ibekwe	Carson	Mike Nardi	St. Patrick	Cartier Martin	Aldine Nimitz	
2003	David Padgett	Reno	Drew Lavender	Brookhaven	Demetris Nichols	St. Andrew's	Rich McBride	Lanphier	
2003	Chris Paul	West Forsyth	Travis Outlaw	Starkville	Terrence Roberts	St. Anthony	Paul Millsap	Grambling Laboratory	
2003	Kendrick Perkins	Ozen	Sebastian Telfair	Abraham Lincoln	Rodrick Stewart	Rainier Beach	Ayinde Ubaka	Oakland Technical	
2003	Leon Powe	Oakland Technical	Von Wafer	Heritage Christian Academy	Chris Taft	Xaverian	Darius Washington	Edgewater	
2004	Glen Davis	Louisiana State University Laboratory School	LaMarcus Aldridge	Seagoville	Arron Afflalo	Centennial	Corey Brewer	Portland	
2004	Rudy Gay	Archbishop Spalding	Joe Crawford	Renaissance	Monta Ellis	Lanier	Toney Douglas	Jonesboro	
2004	Malik Hairston	Renaissance	Jordan Farmar	William Howard Taft	Richard Hendrix	Athens	Tasmin Mitchell	Denham Springs	
2004	Dwight Howard	Southwest Atlanta Christian Academy	Daniel Gibson	Jesse H. Jones	Jason Horton	Cedar Hill	Drew Neitzel	Wyoming Park (Wyoming, Mich.)	
2004	Al Jefferson	Prentiss	Jawann McClellan	Milby	Randolph Morris	Landmark Christian	Gabe Pruitt	Westchester	
2004	Shaun Livingston	Peoria Central	DeMarcus Nelson	Sheldon	Greg Oden	Lawrence North	A. J. Ratliff	North Central	
2004	Josh Smith	Oak Hill Academy	Rajon Rondo	Oak Hill Academy	Jason Rich	Dr. Phillips	Russell Robinson	Rice	
2004	Sebastian Telfair	Abraham Lincoln	J. R. Smith	Saint Benedict's Preparatory School	Josh Shipp	Fairfax	Cedric Simmons	West Brunswick	
2004	Darius Washington	Edgewater	Ronald Steele	John Carroll Catholic	Lou Williams	South Gwinnett	Robert Vaden	Bridgton Academy	
2004	Marvin Williams	Bremerton	Robert Swift	Bakersfield	Mike Williams	Wilcox Central	D. J. White	Hillcrest	
2005	Monta Ellis	Lanier	Jon Brockman	Snohomish Senior	Jamal Boykin	Fairfax	Korvotney Barber	Manchester	
2005	Tyler Hansbrough	Poplar Bluff	Kevin Durant	Montrose	Keith Brumbaugh	DeLand	Eric Boateng	St. Andrew's School	
2005	Richard Hendrix	Athens	Byron Eaton	Lincoln	Andrew Bynum	St. Joseph	Lewis Clinch	Crisp County	
2005	Josh McRoberts	Carmel	Jamont Gordon	Oak Hill Academy	Mario Chalmers	Bartlett	Darren Collison	Etiwanda	
2005	C. J. Miles	Skyline	Danny Green	St. Mary's	Wilson Chandler	Benton Harbor	Micah Downs	Juanita	
2005	Tasmin Mitchell	Denham Springs	Amir Johnson	Westchester	Brandon Costner	Seton Hall Preparatory School	Bobby Frasor	Brother Rice	
2005	Greg Oden	Lawrence North	James Keefe	Santa Margarita Catholic	Eric Devendorf	Oak Hill Academy	Dwight Lewis	Taylor	
2005	Martell Webster	Seattle Preparatory School	O. J. Mayo	North College Hill	Jerel McNeal	Hillcrest	Mike Mercer	South Gwinnett	
2005	Lou Williams	South Gwinnett	Greg Paulus	Christian Brothers Academy	J. P. Prince	White Station	Jon Scheyer	Glenbrook North	
2005	Brandan Wright	Brentwood Academy	Julian Wright	Homewood-Flossmoor	Derrick Rose	Simeon Career Academy	Kevin Swinton	James B. Dudley	
2006	Chase Budinger	La Costa Canyon	Michael Beasley	Notre Dame Preparatory	Darrell Arthur	South Oak Cliff	D. J. Augustin	Hightower	
2006	Kevin Durant	Montrose Christian School	Gerald Henderson	Episcopal Academy	Tweety Carter	Reserve Christian School	Jerryd Bayless	St. Mary's	
2006	Wayne Ellington	Episcopal Academy	Damion James	Nacogdoches	Sherron Collins	Crane	Earl Clark	Rahway	
2006	Spencer Hawes	Seattle Preparatory School	James Keefe	Santa Margarita Catholic	Mike Conley Jr.	Lawrence North	Eric Gordon	North Central	
2006	Ty Lawson	Oak Hill Academy	Vernon Macklin	Hargrave Military Academy	Daequan Cook	Dunbar	Raymar Morgan	Canton McKinley	
2006	Kevin Love	Lake Oswego	Stanley Robinson	Huffman	Duke Crews	Bethel	Derrick Rose	Simeon Career Academy	
2006	O. J. Mayo	North College Hill	Kyle Singler	South Medford	Javaris Crittenton	Southwest Atlanta Christian Academy	DeShawn Sims	Pershing	
2006	Greg Oden	Lawrence North	Lance Thomas	Saint Benedict's Preparatory School	Brook Lopez	San Joaquin Memorial	Jerry Smith	Wauwatosa East	
2006	Jon Scheyer	Glenbrook North	Henry Walker	North College Hill	Robin Lopez	San Joaquin Memorial	Alex Stepheson	Harvard-Westlake School	
2006	Brandan Wright	Brentwood Academy	Thaddeus Young	Mitchell	Scottie Reynolds	Herndon	Brian Zoubek	Haddonfield Memorial	
2007	Jerryd Bayless	St. Mary's	Cole Aldrich	Bloomington Jefferson	James Anderson	Junction City	Jon Diebler	Upper Sandusky	
2007	Nick Calathes	Lake Howell	Jonny Flynn	Niagara Falls	Blake Griffin	Oklahoma Christian	Tyreke Evans	American Christian Academy	
2007	Austin Freeman	DeMatha Catholic	James Harden	Artesia	Jrue Holiday	Campbell Hall School	Corey Fisher	St. Patrick	
2007	Eric Gordon	North Central	J. J. Hickson	Joseph Wheeler	Brandon Jennings	Oak Hill Academy	Senario Hillman	Wilkinson County	
2007	Donté Greene	Towson Catholic	Taylor King	Mater Dei	Gary Johnson	Aldine Nimitz	Rick Jackson	Neumann-Goretti	
2007	Kevin Love	Lake Oswego	Gani Lawal	Norcross	DeAndre Jordan	Christian Life Center	Alex Legion	Oak Hill Academy	
2007	O. J. Mayo	Huntington	Jai Lucas	Bellaire	Kosta Koufos	Glen Oak	Herb Pope	Aliquippa	
2007	Derrick Rose	Simeon Career Academy	Patrick Patterson	Huntington	Greg Monroe	Helen Cox	Anthony Randolph	Woodrow Wilson	
2007	Kyle Singler	South Medford	Corey Stokes	Saint Benedict's Preparatory School	E'Twaun Moore	East Chicago Central	Delvon Roe	St. Edward	
2007	Nolan Smith	Oak Hill Academy	Chris Wright	St. John's College	Dar Tucker	Arthur Hill	Durrell Summers	Redford	
2008	Brandon Jennings	Oak Hill Academy (Mouth of Wilson, Va.)	Ed Davis	Benedictine (Richmond, Va.)	Willie Warren	North Crowley (Fort Worth, Tex.)	Kenny Boynton	American Heritage (Plantation, Fla.)	
2008	Samardo Samuels	St. Benedict's (Newark, N. J.)	Derrick Favors	South Atlanta (Atlanta, Ga.)	Michael Dunigan	Farragut Academy (Chicago, Ill.)	DeQuan Jones	Wheeler (Marietta, Ga.)	
2008	Tyreke Evans	American Christian (Aston, Pa.)	Kemba Walker	Rice (New York, N. Y.)	JaMychal Green	St. Jude (Montgomery, Ala.)	Tony Woods	Rome (Rome, Ga.)	
2008	Jrue Holiday	Campbell Hall (North Hollywood, Calif.)	Lance Stephenson	Abraham Lincoln (Brooklyn, N. Y.)	Chris Singleton	Dunwoody (Dunwoody, Ga.)	Renardo Sidney	(Fairfax; Los Angeles, Calif.)	
2008	Tyler Zeller	Washington (Washington, Ind.)	Luke Babbitt	Galena (Reno, Nev.)	Larry Drew	Taft (Woodland Hills, Calif.)	Terrelle Pryor	Jeannette (Jeannette, Pa.)	
2008	Al-Farouq Aminu	Norcross (Norcross, Ga.)	Elliot Williams	St. George's (Collierville, Tenn.)	Iman Shumpert	Oak Park & River Forest (Oak Park, Ill.)	Yancy Gates	Withrow (Cincinnati, Ohio)	
2008	B. J. Mullens	Canal Winchester (Canal Winchester, Ohio)	Sylven Landesberg	Holy Cross (Flushing, N. Y.)	Leslie McDonald	Briarcrest Christian (Eads, Tenn.)	Draymond Green	Saginaw (Saginaw, Mich.)	
2008	DeMar DeRozan	Compton (Compton, Calif.)	Scotty Hopson	University Heights (Hopkinsville, Ky.)	Dexter Strickland	St. Patrick (Elizabeth, N. J.)	Kevin Jones	Mount Vernon (Mount Vernon, N. Y.)	
2008	William Buford	Libbey (Toledo, Ohio)	Xavier Henry	Putnam City (Oklahoma City, Okla.)	Howard Thompkins	Wesleyan (Norcross, Ga.)	Malcolm Lee	J. W. North (Riverside, Calif.)	
2008	Greg Monroe	Helen Cox (Harvey, La.)	Mike Rosario	St. Anthony (Jersey City, N. J.)	Darius Miller	Mason County (Maysville, Ky.)	Henry Sims	Mount St. Joseph (Baltimore, Md.)	
2009	Derrick Favors	South Atlanta (Atlanta, Ga.)	Abdul Gaddy	Bellarmine Prep (Tacoma, Wash.)	Dominic Cheek	St. Anthony (Jersey City, N. J.)	David Wear	Mater Dei (Santa Ana, Calif.)	
2009	Xavier Henry	Putnam City (Oklahoma City, Okla.)	Jared Sullinger	Northland (Columbus, Ohio)	Mason Plumlee	Christ School (Arden, N. C.)	Travis Wear	Mater Dei (Santa Ana, Calif.)	
2009	John Henson	Sickles (Tampa, Fla.)	Alex Oriakhi	The Tilton School (Tilton, N. H.)	Mouphtaou Yarou	Montrose Christian (Rockville, Md.)	Terrell Vinson	St. Frances (Baltimore, Md.)	
2009	DeMarcus Cousins	John LeFlore (Mobile, Ala.)	Joshua Smith	Kentwood (Covington, Wash.)	Keith Gallon	Oak Hill Academy (Mouth of Wilson, Va.)	Deshaun Thomas	Bishop Luers (Fort Wayne, Ind.)	
2009	Renardo Sidney	Fairfax (Los Angeles, Calif.)	Dante Taylor	National Christian (Fort Washington, Md.)	Maalik Wayns	Roman Catholic (Philadelphia, Pa.)	Lorenzo Brown	Centennial (Roswell, Ga.)	
2009	Lance Stephenson	Abraham Lincoln (Brooklyn, N. Y.)	Jeremy Tyler	San Diego (San Diego, Calif.)	Tyler Honeycutt	Sylmar (Sylmar, Calif.)	Thomas Robinson	Brewster Academy (Wolfeboro, N.H.)	
2009	Kenny Boynton	American Heritage (Plantation, Fla.)	Wally Judge	Arlington Country Day (Jacksonville, Fla.)	John Jenkins	Station Camp (Gallatin, Tenn.)	Leslie McDonald	Briarcrest Christian (Eads, Tenn.)	
2009	Ryan Kelly	Ravenscroft (Raleigh, N.C.)	Harrison Barnes	Ames (Ames, Iowa)	Mfon Udofia	Miller Grove (Lithonia, Ga.)	Erik Murphy	St. Mark's (Southborough, Mass.)	
2009	Avery Bradley	Findlay College Prep (Henderson, Nev.)	Brandon Knight	Pine Crest (Fort Lauderdale, Fla.)	Peyton Siva	Franklin (Seattle, Wash.)	Roger Franklin	Duncanville (Duncanville, Tex.)	
2009	Dexter Strickland	St. Patrick (Elizabeth, N.J.)	Milton Jennings	Pinewood Prep (Summerville, S. C.)	Durand Scott	Rice (New York, N. Y.)	D. J. Richardson	Findlay College Prep (Henderson, Nev.)	

=== 2010–2015 ===
Season	First team		Second team		Third team		Fourth team		Ref
Season	Player	High school	Player	High school	Player	High school	Player	High school	Ref
2010	Jared Sullinger	Northland (Columbus, Ohio)	Tristan Thompson	Findlay College Prep (Henderson, Nev.)	Ryan Harrow	Walton (Marietta, Ga.)	Allen Crabbe	Price (Los Angeles, Calif.)	
2010	Harrison Barnes	Ames (Ames, Iowa)	Michael Gilchrist	St. Patrick (Elizabeth, N. J.)	Kendall Marshall	Bishop O'Connell (Arlington, Va.)	Ian Miller	United Faith Christian; Charlotte, N. C.)	
2010	Brandon Knight	Pine Crest (Fort Lauderdale, Fla.)	Doron Lamb	Oak Hill Academy (Mouth of Wilson, Va.)	Josh Hairston	Montrose Christian (Rockville, Md.)	Adreian Payne	Jefferson (Dayton, Ohio)	
2010	Kyrie Irving	St. Patrick (Elizabeth, N. J.)	Austin Rivers	Winter Park (Winter Park, Fla.)	Nate Lubick	St. Mark's (Southborough, Ma.)	James McAdoo	Norfolk Christian (Norfolk, Va.)	
2010	Deshaun Thomas	Bishop Luers (Fort Wayne, Ind.)	Josh Selby	Lake Clifton (Baltimore, Md.)	Fab Melo	Sagemont (Weston, Fla.)	Marquis Teague	Pike (Indianapolis, Ind.)	
2010	Tobias Harris	Half Hollow Hills West (Dix Hills, N. Y.)	C. J. Leslie	Word of God Christian (Raleigh, N .C.)	Keith Appling	Pershing (Detroit, Mich.)	Marcus Thornton	Westlake (Atlanta, Ga.)	
2010	Cory Joseph	Findlay College Prep (Henderson, Nev.)	Dion Waiters	Life Center Academy (Burlington, N. J.)	Jereme Richmond	Waukegan (Waukegan, Ill.)	James Bell	Montverde Academy (Montverde, Fla.)	
2010	Terrence Jones	Jefferson (Portland, Ore.)	Patric Young	Providence (Jacksonville, Fla.)	Jelan Kendrick	Wheeler (Marietta, Ga.)	Tyler Lamb	Mater Dei (Santa Ana, Calif.)	
2010	Reggie Bullock	Kinston (Kinston, N. C.)	JayVaughn Pinkston	Bishop Loughlin (Brooklyn, N.Y.)	Joe Young	Yates (Houston, Tex.)	Corey Hawkins	Estrella Foothills (Goodyear, Ariz.)	
2010	Joe Jackson	White Station (Memphis, Tenn).	Ray McCallum Jr.	Detroit County Day (Beverly Hills, Mich.)	Perry Jones	Duncanville (Duncanville, Tex.)	Noah Cottrill	Logan; Logan, W. Va.	
2011	Austin Rivers	Winter Park (Fla.)	D'Angelo Harrison	Dulles (Tex.)	Wesley Saunders	Windward (Calif.)	Julien Lewis	La Marque (Tex.)	
2011	Bradley Beal	Chaminade (Mo.)	Adam Smith	Fayette County (Ga.)	Shelby Moats	Waconia (Minn.)	Jake White	Chaska (Minn.)	
2011	Anthony Davis	Perspectives (Ill.)	Tony Wroten	Garfield (Wash.)	Devonta Abron	Seagoville (Tex.)	Johnny O'Bryant	East Side (Miss.)	
2011	Chase Fischer	Ripley (W.Va.)	Chane Behanan	Bowling Green (Ky.)	Jarvis Threatt	Highland Springs (Va.)	Tanner Wozniak	Keswick Christian (Fla.)	
2011	Adonis Thomas	Melrose (Tenn.)	Cody Zeller	Washington (Ind.)	Amir Williams	Detroit C.D. (Mich.)	Myck Kabongo	Findlay Prep (Nev.)	
2011	Rodney Cooper	Russell County (Ala.)	Trey Burke	Northland (Ohio)	Jordan Baker	Tempe (Ariz.)	Reese Morgan	Palos Verdes Pen. (Calif.)	
2011	Dantley Walker	Lincoln County (Nev.)	Kyle Caudill	Brea Olinda (Calif.)	Branden Dawson	Wallace (Ind.)	Michael Gilchrist	St. Patrick (N.J.)	
2011	D. J. Gardner	Okolona (Miss.)	Jahii Carson	Mesa (Ariz.)	P. J. Hairston	Hargrave Military (Va.)	Colin Gruber	Harbor (Calif.)	
2011	Trevor Lacey	Butler (Ala.)	LeBryan Nash	Lincoln (Tex.)	James McAdoo	Norfolk Christian (Va.)	Ryan Spangler	Bridge Creek (Okla.)	
2011	Wayne Blackshear	Morgan Park (Ill.)	Angelo Chol	Hoover (Calif.)	Xavier Ford	Harrison (Colo.)	Marquis Teague	Pike (Ind.)	

Season	First team								Ref
Season	Player	High school	Player	High school	Player	High school	Player	High school	Ref
2012	Adolphus Washington	Taft (Cincinnati, Ohio)	Alex Poythress	Northeast (Clarksville, Tenn.)	Archie Goodwin	Sylvan (Sherwood, Ark)	Brandon Ashley	Findlay Prep (Henderson, Nev.)	
2012	Brice Johnson	Edisto (Cordova, S. C.)	Bruce Marshall	Fayette (Fayette, Mo.)	Cameron Biedscheid	Cardinal Ritter (St. Louis, Mo.)	Deandre Burnett	Carol City (Miami Gardens, Fla.)	
2012	Devonta Pollard	Kemper County (De Kalb, Miss.)	Dewayne Russell	Peoria (Peoria, Ariz.)	Gary Harris	Hamilton Southeastern (Fishers, Ind.)	Grant Jerrett	Lutheran (La Verne, Calif.)	
2012	Isaiah Cousins	Mount Vernon (Mount Vernon, N. Y.)	Javion Watson	San Ysidro (San Diego, Calif.)	Joe McDonald	Landon School (Bethesda, Md.)	John Ross Glover	Univ. School of Jackson (Jackson, Tenn.)	
2012	John Simons	Cadillac (Cadillac, Mich.)	Jordan Loveridge	West Jordan (West Jordan, Utah)	Josh Scott	Lewis-Palmer (Monument, Colo.)	Kaleb Tarczewski	St. Mark's (Southborough, Mass.)	
2012	Kenneth Gaines	Whitefield Academy (Mableton, Ga.)	Kris Dunn	New London (New London, Conn.)	Kyle Anderson	St. Anthony (Jersey City, N. J.)	Marcus Paige	Linn-Mar High (Marion, Iowa)	
2012	Matt Costello	Bay City Western (Auburn, Mich.)	Maurice Watson	Boys Latin Charter (Philadelphia, Penn.)	Mike Gesell	South Sioux City (South Sioux City, Neb.)	Mitch McGary	Brewster Academy (Wolfeboro, N. H.)	
2012	Nerlens Noel	Tilton School (Tilton, N. H.)	Omar Calhoun	Christ the King (Middle Village, N. Y.)	Perry Ellis	Heights (Wichita, Kan.)	Rasheed Sulaimon	Strake Jesuit (Houston, Texas)	
2012	Rodney Purvis	Upper Room Christian (Raleigh, N. C.)	Sam Dekker	Sheboygan Area Lutheran (Sheboygan, Wis.)	Savon Goodman	Constitution (Philadelphia, Penn.)	Shabazz Muhammad	Bishop Gorman (Las Vegas, Nev.)	
2012	Stefan Moody	Poinciana (Kissimmee, Fla.)	Tony Hicks	St. Rita (Chicago, Ill.)	Tony Parker	Miller Grove (Lithonia, Ga.)	Twymond Howard	Pearl High (Pearl, Miss.)	
2013	A. J. Jacobson	Shanley (Fargo, N.D.)	Aaron Gordon	Archbishop Mitty (San Jose, Calif.)	Aaron Harrison	Travis (Richmond, Texas)	Anders Broman	Lakeview Christian Academy (Duluth, Minn.)	
2013	Andrew Wiggins	Huntington Prep (Huntington, W.V.)	Austin Nichols	Briarcrest Christian (Eads, Tenn.)	Bobby Portis	Hall (Little Rock, Ark.)	Brannen Greene	Tift County (Tifton, Ga.)	
2013	Bryce Alford	La Cueva (Albuquerque, N.M.)	Chris Walker	Holmes County (Bonifay, Fla.)	Conner Frankamp	North (Wichita, Kan.)	Cullen Neal	Eldorado (Albuquerque, N.M.)	
2013	Derrick Walton Jr.	Chandler Park Academy (Harper Woods, Mich.)	De'Runnya Wilson	Wenonah (Birmingham, Ala.)	Dominique Hawkins	Madison Central (Richmond, Ky.)	Garet Beal	Jonesport-Beals (Jonesport, Maine)	
2013	Isaiah Hicks	J. F. Webb (Oxford, N.C.)	Jabari Parker	Simeon (Chicago, Ill.)	James Young	Rochester (Rochester Hills, Mich.)	Jarell Martin	Madison Prep Academy (Baton Rouge, La.)	
2013	Jon Severe	Christ The King (Queens, N. Y.)	Luke Fischer	Germantown (Wis.)	Mamadou N'Diaye	Brethren Christian (Huntington Beach, Calif.)	Marc Loving	St. John's (Toledo, Ohio)	
2013	Marcus Allen	Centennial (Las Vegas, Nev.)	Marcus Foster	Hirschi (Wichita Falls, Texas)	Marcus Lee	Deer Valley (Antioch, Calif.)	Monté Morris	Beecher (Flint, Mich.)	
2013	Nick King	Memphis East (Memphis, Tenn.)	Nigel Williams-Goss	Findlay Prep (Henderson, Nev.)	Peter Jok	Valley (West Des Moines, Iowa)	Ricky Seals-Jones	Sealy (Texas)	
2013	Roschon Prince	Poly (Long Beach, Calif.)	Rysheed Jordan	Vaux (Philadelphia)	Semi Ojeleye	Ottawa (Kan.)	Steve Vasturia	St. Joseph's (Philadelphia, Pa.)	
2013	Stevie Clark	Douglass (Oklahoma City)	Tyler Ennis	St. Benedict's Prep (Newark, N.J.)	Zach LaVine	Bothell (Wash.)	Zak Irvin	Hamilton Southeastern (Fishers, Ind.)	
2014	Cliff Alexander	Curie Metropolitan (Chicago, Ill.)	Joel Berry II	Lake Highland (Orlando, Fla.)	James Blackmon Jr.	Marion (Ind.)	Trevon Bluiett	Park Tudor School (Indianapolis)	
2014	Gabe DeVoe	Shelby (N.C.)	J. T. Escobar	FAMU High (Tallahassee, Fla.)	Daniel Hamilton	St. John Bosco (Bellflower, Calif.)	Justin Jackson	Homeschool Christian (Spring, Texas)	
2014	Stanley Johnson	Mater Dei (Santa Ana, Calif.)	Kevon Looney	Hamilton (Milwaukee, Wisc.)	Trey Lyles	Arsenal Tech (Indianapolis, Ind.)	Emmanuel Mudiay	Prime Prep Academy (Dallas, Texas)	
2014	Jahlil Okafor	Whitney Young (Chicago, Ill.)	Kelly Oubre	Findlay Prep (Henderson, Nev.)	Devin Robinson	Christchurch (Va.)	B. J. Taylor	Boone (Orlando, Fla.)	
2014	Karl-Anthony Towns	Saint Joseph (Metuchen, N.J.)	Myles Turner	Trinity (Euless, Texas)	Isaiah Whitehead	Lincoln (Brooklyn, N.Y.)	Justise Winslow	St. John's (Houston, Texas)	
2015	KeVaughn Allen	North Little Rock (Ark.)	Dwayne Bacon	Oak Hill (Mouth of Wilson, Va.)	Antonio Blakeney	Oak Ridge (Orlando, Fla.)	Isaiah Briscoe	Roselle Catholic (Newark, N.J.)	
2015	Bjorn Broman	Lakeview Christian (Duluth, Minn.)	Jaylen Brown	Wheeler (Marietta, Ga.)	Jalen Brunson	Stevenson (Lincolnshire, Ill.)	Deyonta Davis	Muskegon (Mich.)	
2015	Cheick Diallo	Our Savior (Centereach, N.Y.)	Tyler Dorsey	Maranatha (Pasadena, Calif.)	Henry Ellenson	Rice Lake (Wisc.)	Jawun Evans	Kimball (Dallas, Texas)	
2015	Admon Gilder	Madison (Dallas, Texas)	Brandon Ingram	Kinston (N.C.)	Camron Justice	Knott Co. Central (Hindman, Ky.)	Luke Kennard	Franklin (Ohio)	
2015	Skal Labissière	Reach Your Dream Prep (Memphis, Tenn.)	Dedric Lawson	Hamilton (Memphis, Tenn.)	Shake Milton	Owasso (Okla.)	Dejounte Murray	Rainier Beach (Seattle, Wash.)	
2015	Malik Newman	Callaway (Jackson, Miss.)	Ivan Rabb	Bishop O'Dowd (Oakland, Calif.)	Malachi Richardson	Trenton Catholic (Hamilton, N.J.)	Justin Robinson	Saint James (Hagerstown, Md.)	
2015	Matt Ryan	Iona Prep (Cortlandt Manor, N.Y.)	Ben Simmons	Montverde Academy (Montverde, Fla.)	Diamond Stone	Dominican (Milwaukee, Wisc.)	Caleb Swanigan	Homestead (Fort Wayne, Ind.)	
2015	Dean Wade	St. John (Kan.)	Jesse Wade	Davis (Kaysville, Utah)	N/A	N/A	N/A	N/A	
