= Felipe López (basketball) =

Dominican Republic basketball player (born 1974)

- López in 2016

Personal information
- Born: December 19, 1974 (age 51) Santo Domingo, Dominican Republic
- Listed height: 6 ft 5 in (1.96 m)
- Listed weight: 199 lb (90 kg)

Career information
- High school: Rice (New York City, New York)
- College: St. John's (1994–1998)
- NBA draft: 1998: 1st round, 24th overall pick
- Drafted by: San Antonio Spurs
- Playing career: 1998–2011
- Position: Shooting guard
- Number: 13

Career history
- 1998–2000: Vancouver Grizzlies
- 2000–2001: Washington Wizards
- 2001–2002: Minnesota Timberwolves
- 2002: Diablos de La Vega
- 2004–2005: Long Beach Jam
- 2005: Baskets Oldenburg
- 2005: Caballeros de Santiago
- 2006: Plus Pujol Lleida
- 2006–2007: Albany Patroons
- 2007: Villa Duarte de Calero
- 2007–2008: Minas Tênis Clube
- 2008: Gregorio Urbano Gilbert
- 2008: Marineros de Puerto Plata
- 2008: Gaiteros del Zulia
- 2009: Fuerza Regia de Monterrey
- 2009: Obras Sanitarias
- 2010–2011: Gregorio Urbano Gilbert

Career highlights
- First-team All-Big East (1998); 2x Third-team All-Big East (1995, 1997); Haggerty Award winner (1998); National high school player of the year (1994); Mr. New York Basketball (1994); McDonald's All-American MVP (1994); 2× First-team Parade All-American (1993, 1994); Second-team Parade All-American (1992)

Career statistics
- Points: 1,448
- Assists: 252
- Rebounds: 604
- Stats at NBA.com
- Stats at Basketball Reference

Luis Felipe López (born December 19, 1974) is a Dominican former professional basketball player. He starred as a high school player at Rice High School and for the St. John's Red Storm in college basketball. López played for four seasons in the National Basketball Association (NBA). He has played for teams in a half dozen countries, as well as in the Continental Basketball Association (CBA) in the U.S. Most recently, he has been a broadcaster with Spanish-language networks. His life story was the subject of an ESPN 30 for 30 documentary entitled The Dominican Dream.

== Early life ==
López's father, who played amateur baseball in the Dominican Republic, and his family immigrated to the U.S. when he was 14. López played high school basketball at Rice High School in New York City, where he followed New York high school player Dean Meminger in becoming one of the most highly touted recruits in U.S. high school history. The 6 ft 5 in (1.96 m) guard made many All-American lists in 1994, earning Player of the Year honors from Gatorade, USA Today, Parade, and many others.

== College career ==
López appeared on the cover of Sports Illustrated before he had played his first college game. He also appeared with Jim Brown and Jackie Joyner-Kersee at a televised town meeting on race and sports along with then-president Bill Clinton. López was the only Latino onstage during the discussion. López and Allen Iverson were the two most lauded recruits coming out of prep that year, and both went on to play in the Big East.

López finished his freshman season for the St. John's Red Storm with a 17.8-point-per-game scoring average. He earned a spot on the All-Big East Rookie Team and All-Big East Third Team. His numbers dipped slightly the next two years, bottoming out at 15.9 ppg as a junior.

As a senior, playing under head coach Fran Fraschilla whom he described as "a great person and a great coach," he averaged 17.6 points (7th in the Big East), 2.7 assists, and 1.2 steals per game, and garnered All-Big East First Team honors. He finished his career with 1,927 points, placing him fourth all-time in St. John's history behind former players Chris Mullin, Malik Sealy, and D'Angelo Harrison and sixth in Big East history with 1,222 conference points, while also ranking seventh all time in steals, 14th in assists, and 20th in rebounds. He once held the St. John's record for most three-pointers made in a single season (60) and in a career (148), but was surpassed by D'Angelo Harrison.

== Professional career ==
López was selected by the San Antonio Spurs with the 24th pick in the 1998 NBA draft and was immediately traded, along with Carl Herrera, to the Vancouver Grizzlies for point guard Antonio Daniels. López's drafting into the NBA was cause for great celebration in the heavily Dominican community of Washington Heights in New York City. He played 112 games for the Grizzlies before being traded to the Washington Wizards along with Dennis Scott, Cherokee Parks, and Obinna Ekezie in exchange for free agent Isaac Austin on August 22, 2000. López went on to sign as a free agent with both the Minnesota Timberwolves and Dallas Mavericks, although he never played a regular season game for the Mavs. He trained with the Orlando Magic and Los Angeles Clippers in the first months of the 2005–06 NBA season before signing a contract with Lleida.

López holds career NBA averages of 5.8 points, 2.4 rebounds and one assist per game.

== Career statistics ==
Legend
GP	Games played	GS	Games started	MPG	Minutes per game
FG%	Field goal percentage	3P%	3-point field goal percentage	FT%	Free throw percentage
RPG	Rebounds per game	APG	Assists per game	SPG	Steals per game
BPG	Blocks per game	PPG	Points per game	**Bold**	Career high

=== NBA ===
==== Regular season ====
Year	Team	GP	GS	MPG	FG%	3P%	FT%	RPG	APG	SPG	BPG	PPG
1998–99	Vancouver	47	32	**25.9**	.446	.273	.644	**3.5**	1.3	**1.0**	0.3	**9.3**
1999–00	Vancouver	65	0	12.0	.425	.167	.615	1.9	0.7	0.5	0.3	4.5
2000–01	Washington	47	**38**	23.6	.436	.207	**.732**	3.4	**1.6**	0.9	0.4	8.1
2000–01	Minnesota	23	10	19.9	**.454**	**.565**	.576	3.2	1.5	0.9	**0.5**	7.4
2001–02	Minnesota	**67**	0	8.7	.378	.424	.673	1.2	0.6	0.3	0.0	2.5
Career		249	80	16.6	.432	.327	.659	2.4	1.0	0.6	0.2	5.8

==== Playoffs ====
Year	Team	GP	GS	MPG	FG%	3P%	FT%	RPG	APG	SPG	BPG	PPG
2001	Minnesota	**4**	0	**13.8**	**.318**	.200	**.667**	**2.8**	**1.3**	**1.0**	.0	**4.3**
2002	Minnesota	3	0	10.0	.250	**.500**	.500	.3	.3	.3	.0	1.3
Career		7	0	12.1	.308	.286	.600	1.7	.9	.7	.0	3.0
