= Chris Herren =

American basketball player (born 1975)

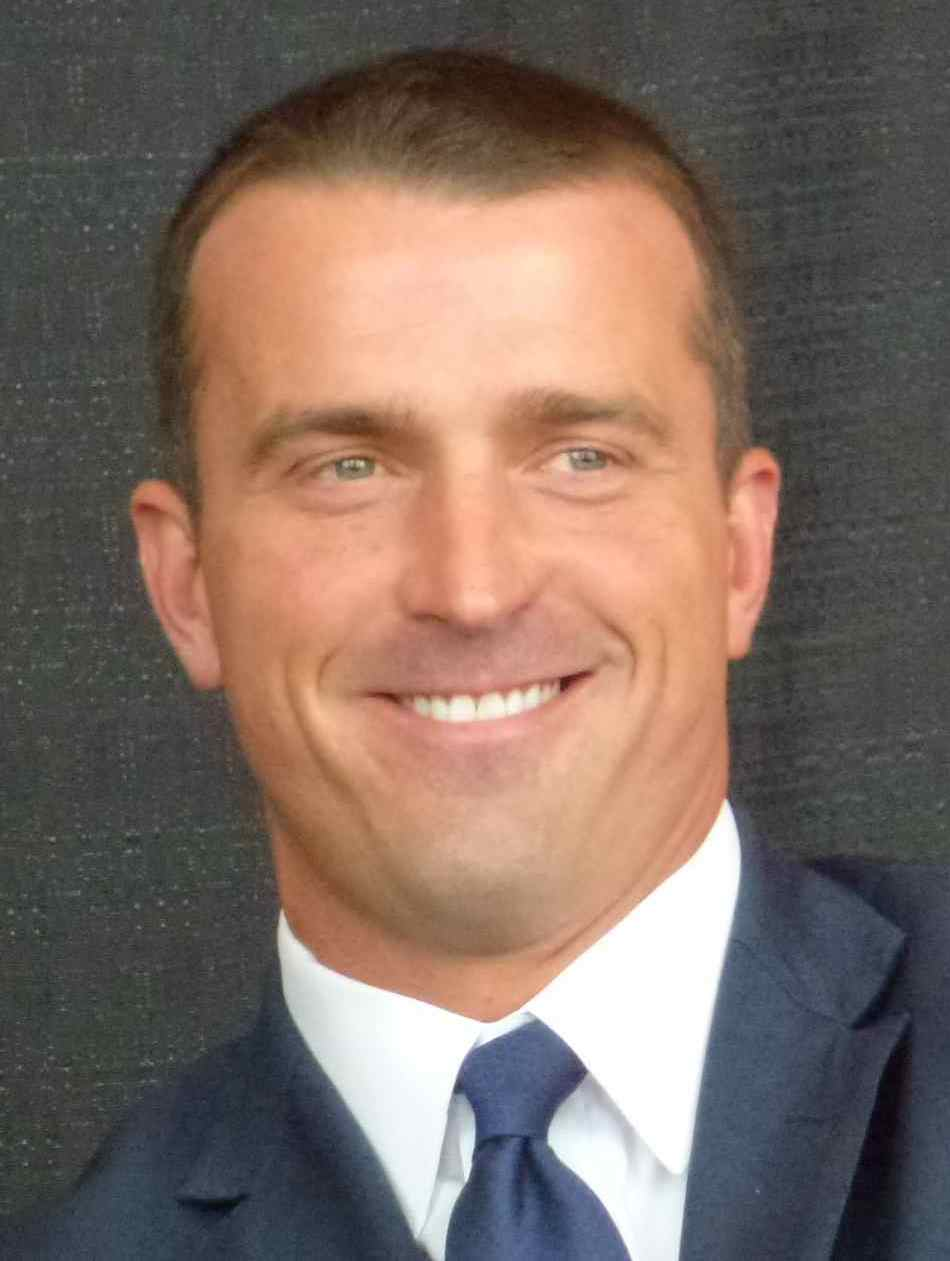
- Herren in 2013

Personal information
- Born: September 27, 1975 (age 51) Fall River, Massachusetts, U.S.
- Listed height: 6 ft 2 in (1.88 m)
- Listed weight: 195 lb (88 kg)

Career information
- High school: B.M.C. Durfee (Fall River, Massachusetts)
- College: Boston College (1994–1995); Fresno State (1996–1999)
- NBA draft: 1999: 2nd round, 33rd overall pick
- Drafted by: Denver Nuggets
- Playing career: 1999–2006
- Position: Point guard
- Number: 8, 12

Career history
- 1999–2000: Denver Nuggets
- 2000–2001: Boston Celtics
- 2001: Skipper Bologna
- 2002: Galatasaray
- 2002–2003: Beijing Ducks
- 2003–2004: Jiangsu Dragons
- 2004: Energy Braunschweig
- 2005: Paykan
- 2006: Anwil Wloclawek

Career highlights
- First-team All-WAC (1998); McDonald's All-American (1994); Second-team Parade All-American (1994)
- Stats at NBA.com
- Stats at Basketball Reference

Christopher Albert Herren (born September 27, 1975) is an American former professional basketball player and motivational speaker, primarily concerning his past drug and alcohol addiction. He played in the NBA and several leagues overseas.

== Youth and high school ==
Herren attended B.M.C. Durfee High School in Fall River, Massachusetts, from 1990 to 1994. His family's history at Durfee includes his father, grandfather, older brother, and three uncles who played basketball. Herren finished his career at Durfee High with a total of 2,073 points, the most career points in school history. In his senior year, Herren was named The Boston Globe and Gatorade player of the year. He also was named to the McDonald's All-America Team. Herren was the central figure in a book about Durfee High basketball entitled Fall River Dreams.

== College basketball ==
=== Boston College (1994) ===
Herren turned down offers from the University of Kentucky and Duke University to play at Boston College. Entering Boston College, Herren was featured in Sports Illustrated, hyping his possible success. Before playing, Herren failed a drug test for marijuana and cocaine use. On November 25, 1994, in his first game for Boston College, Herren scored 14 points in 21 minutes of playing time, but broke his wrist and was ruled out for the entire 1994–1995 season. Within three months of his injury, Herren failed two more drug tests for marijuana and cocaine use, and was subsequently expelled from the team and the university. Herren was a drug addict that couldn't stop his addition, with this he felt he needed more and his body relied on it to "survive".

=== Fresno State (1995–1999) ===
After being kicked out of Boston College, Herren transferred to Fresno State to play basketball under coach Jerry Tarkanian. Here he was hailed as much as at BC, featured in Rolling Stone magazine. After sitting out a year per NCAA transfer rules, Herren first made news in the Fresno Bee for his involvement in a disturbance at a local bar.

Herren impressed everyone at practice and made his debut, as a sophomore, on December 10, 1996. He averaged 31 points per game over his last four games and finished the season averaging 17.5 ppg. On November 25, 1997, Herren was found to have failed another drug test. After going to a rehabilitation center for 21 days, Herren returned to the team on January 10, 1998. This particular season was featured in the FoxSports documentary “Between the Madness.”

Both his exploits on and off the court as well as his mid-season crash after failing that drug test were featured in the two hour doc, culled together from over 600 hours of footage. Herren finished the season strong, willing Fresno State into the National Invitation Tournament by leading the Bulldogs past Hawaii. Herren led the squad into Madison Square Garden but the Bulldogs fell short. In a later press conference Herren announced his plan to stay at Fresno State another year.

During his senior season, Herren scored 29 points in the second round of the Great Alaska Shootout against No. 1 ranked Duke. Fresno lost the game, 93–82, which was nationally televised. Overall, Herren played in 86 games at Fresno State where he averaged 15.1 points and 5.1 assists per game.

== Professional basketball (1999–2006) ==
After his senior year at Fresno State, Herren entered the NBA draft and was selected by the Denver Nuggets in the second round with the 33rd overall pick. The following year as a member of the Boston Celtics, Herren received his first time as a regular starter. After starting 2–3, coach Rick Pitino inserted him into the starting lineup. He started seven games in a row, resulting in a 4–3 record while playing 29 minutes per night. He was later released by the Celtics. Herren ended up playing 70 games from 1999 to 2001 as a member of the Nuggets and Celtics. Overall, he averaged 3.2 points and 2.4 assists per game for his NBA career.

Herren went to play professionally for teams in Italy, Poland, Turkey, China, Germany and Iran. Herren once scored 63 points in a CBA game for the Beijing Ducks.

== NBA career statistics ==
Legend
GP	Games played	GS	Games started	MPG	Minutes per game
FG%	Field goal percentage	3P%	3-point field goal percentage	FT%	Free throw percentage
RPG	Rebounds per game	APG	Assists per game	SPG	Steals per game
BPG	Blocks per game	PPG	Points per game	**Bold**	Career high

Year	Team	GP	GS	MPG	FG%	3P%	FT%	RPG	APG	SPG	BPG	PPG
1999–00	Denver	**45**	1	13.3	**.363**	**.358**	.675	**1.2**	**2.5**	0.3	0.0	3.1
2000–01	Boston	25	**7**	**16.3**	.302	.291	**.750**	0.8	2.2	**0.6**	0.0	**3.3**
Career		70	8	14.4	.336	.328	.692	1.0	2.4	0.4	0.0	3.2

== Drug usage and recovery ==
Herren struggled with substance use for much of his career. While playing for the Boston Celtics, he started to use painkillers such as OxyContin, Vicodin, and Percocet. In December 2004, Herren was charged with possession of heroin after passing out in the drive thru of a Dunkin' Donuts in Portsmouth, Rhode Island. In June 2008 in Fall River, he overdosed on heroin and crashed into a utility pole. According to paramedics, he was dead for thirty seconds.

After completing intensive rehabilitation programs, Herren has been alcohol and drug-free since August 1, 2008. In June 2009, he launched Hoop Dreams, a basketball player development company to mentor players on and off the court. Herren wrote a book with Providence Journal columnist Bill Reynolds titled Basketball Junkie: A Memoir, documenting his career on and off the court. Basketball Junkie was released in May 2011. In 2011, ESPN aired a documentary, Unguarded, directed by Jonathan Hock, based upon Herren's basketball career and drug-related issues. On March 20, 2012, it was announced that Unguarded had been nominated for two Emmys: Outstanding Sports Documentary and Outstanding Editing. Herren now travels the United States sharing his story through Herren Talks, averaging 200 talks a year. Herren has spoken to over a million students and others, while also advocating for curriculum change to help youth get to the core of the need for alcohol and drug abuse - mental health and PTSD awareness. In 2011, Herren founded the nonprofit Herren Project. In 2018, he founded Herren Wellness, a residential drug rehabilitation and treatment center.

== Personal life ==
Herren was raised Catholic and served as an altar boy at the urging of his mother, Cynthia.

Herren and his wife Heather have three children including Chris Jr., who played college basketball for Boston College.
