= Cherokee Parks =

American basketball player (born 1972)

Personal information
- Born: October 11, 1972 (age 54) Huntington Beach, California, U.S.
- Listed height: 6 ft 11 in (2.11 m)
- Listed weight: 210 lb (95 kg)

Career information
- High school: Marina (Huntington Beach, California)
- College: Duke (1991–1995)
- NBA draft: 1995: 1st round, 12th overall pick
- Drafted by: Dallas Mavericks
- Playing career: 1995–2013
- Position: Center / power forward
- Number: 4, 44, 1, 18

Career history
- 1995–1996: Dallas Mavericks
- 1996–1998: Minnesota Timberwolves
- 1998–2000: Vancouver Grizzlies
- 2000: Washington Wizards
- 2000–2001: Los Angeles Clippers
- 2001–2002: San Antonio Spurs
- 2002–2003: Los Angeles Clippers
- 2003: Golden State Warriors
- 2011–2013: U. S. Aubenas

Career highlights
- NCAA champion (1992); 2× Second-team All-ACC (1994, 1995); McDonald's All-American (1991); 2× First-team Parade All-American (1990, 1991)
- Stats at NBA.com
- Stats at Basketball Reference
Medals
Men's basketball
Representing United States
Goodwill Games
Bronze medal – third place	1994 St. Petersburg	National team
FIBA U21 World Championship
Gold medal – first place	1993 Valladolid	National team
FIBA U19 World Championship
Gold medal – first place	1991 Edmonton	National team

Cherokee Bryan Parks (born October 11, 1972) is an American former professional basketball player. He played nine seasons in the National Basketball Association (NBA).

A 6 ft 11 in (211 cm), 240 lb (109 kg) center, Parks played college basketball for the Duke Blue Devils under coach Mike Krzyzewski and won the 1992 national title during his freshman year. After college, he was selected by the Dallas Mavericks in the 1st round (12th overall pick) of the 1995 NBA draft. In his nine-season NBA career (1995–2004), he played for the Mavericks, Minnesota Timberwolves, Vancouver Grizzlies, Los Angeles Clippers, San Antonio Spurs, Washington Wizards, and Golden State Warriors. He averaged career-highs of 7.1 points and 5.5 rebounds per game during the 1997–98 season with Minnesota. Parks came out of retirement in 2011 to play in the fourth tier of the French national league system.

Parks had a stint as a team liaison for the New Orleans Pelicans, and is now in charge of Player Development in the NBA.

In an interview with Sports Illustrated, Parks said that his mother named him "Cherokee" because in 1972, when she was pregnant, "she learned that her husband's great-grandmother had been a full-blooded Cherokee." Parks stated, "It was serious stuff...I was politically active then, and the name was a tribute." His sister was the original bass player for the band Nashville Pussy.
