= Eric Musselman =

American basketball coach (born 1964)

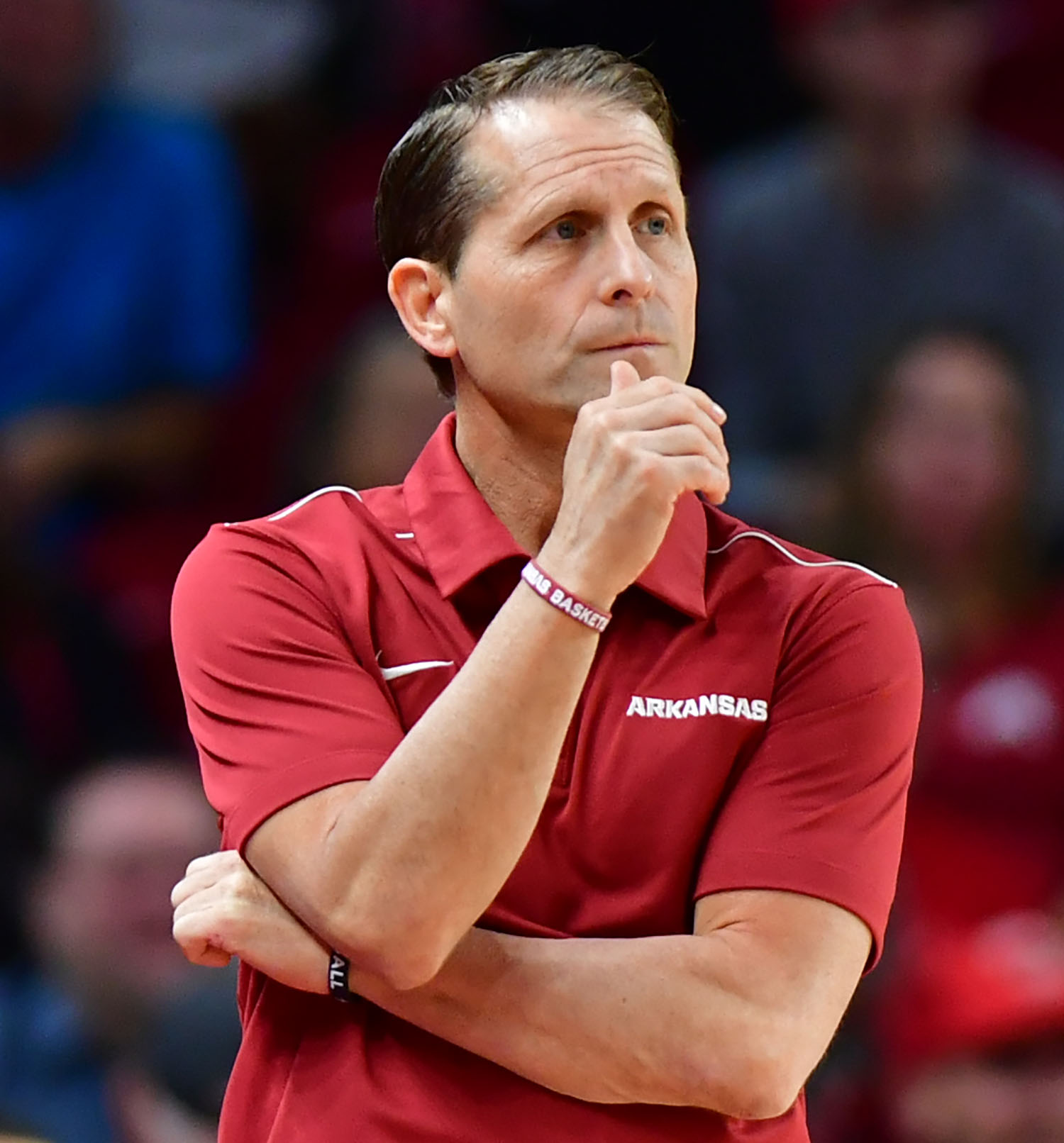
- Musselman with Arkansas in 2019

Current position
- Title: Head coach
- Team: USC
- Conference: Big Ten
- Record: 40–32 (.556)
- Annual salary: $4.25 million

Biographical details
- Born: November 19, 1964 (age 62); Ashland, Ohio, U.S.

Playing career
- 1983–1987: San Diego

Coaching career (HC unless noted)
- 1989–1990: Rapid City Thrillers
- 1990–1991: Minnesota Timberwolves (assistant)
- 1991–1997: Rapid City Thrillers/Florida Beach Dogs
- 1995–1996: Florida Sharks
- 1998–2000: Orlando Magic (assistant)
- 2000–2002: Atlanta Hawks (assistant)
- 2002–2004: Golden State Warriors
- 2004–2006: Memphis Grizzlies (assistant)
- 2006–2007: Sacramento Kings
- 2010–2011: Reno Bighorns
- 2011–2012: Los Angeles D-Fenders
- 2012–2013: Arizona State (assistant)
- 2013–2014: Arizona State (assoc. HC)
- 2014–2015: LSU (assoc. HC)
- 2015–2019: Nevada
- 2019–2024: Arkansas
- 2024–present: USC

International
- 2009: China
- 2010: USA
- 2010–2011: Dominican Republic
- 2011–2013: Venezuela

Administrative career (AD unless noted)
- 1988–1989: Rapid City Thrillers (GM)

Head coaching record
- Overall: 261–125 (.676) (NCAA); 108–138 (.439) (NBA); 270–122 (.689) (CBA); 77–30 (.720) (D-League); 53–3 (.946) (USBL)
- Tournaments: 10–6 (NCAA); 5–1 (CBI); 1–1 (CBC)

Accomplishments and honors

Championships
- 2× USBL (1995, 1996); CBI (2016); 3× MWC regular season (2017–2019); MWC tournament (2017)

Awards
- NBA D-League Coach of the Year (2012); MWC Coach of the Year (2018); USBL Coach of the Year (1996)

Eric Musselman (born November 19, 1964) is an American college basketball coach who is currently the head coach at the University of Southern California. He is the former head coach at the University of Arkansas, University of Nevada, Reno and of the Sacramento Kings and Golden State Warriors of the National Basketball Association (NBA). Between head coaching stints at Golden State and Sacramento, Musselman served as an assistant for the Memphis Grizzlies under Mike Fratello. He moved to the college coaching ranks in 2012 as an assistant at Arizona State. From 2014 to 2019, he was the head coach for the Nevada Wolf Pack. The son of former NBA head coach Bill Musselman, Eric Musselman was a head coach in the Continental Basketball Association (CBA) before becoming an assistant coach with the Minnesota Timberwolves, Orlando Magic (under Chuck Daly and Doc Rivers), and Atlanta Hawks (under Lon Kruger).

== Early life ==
=== High school ===
Musselman grew up in Minneapolis, Minnesota, and San Diego, California, before moving to suburban Cleveland, Ohio, where he attended Brecksville-Broadview Heights High School in Brecksville, a suburb about 15 miles south of Cleveland. There, he played on the same high school basketball team as former NBA player Scott Roth and former NFL Pro Bowl punter/quarterback Tom Tupa.

=== College playing career ===
Musselman graduated from the University of San Diego, where he played basketball for Jim Brovelli and Hank Egan, both of whom would later work as NBA assistants. While Musselman was at USD (1983–87), the Toreros compiled a 77–36 record. He was a member of the 1986–87 team that compiled a 24–6 record, the best in school history. The Toreros lost to Auburn University in the first round of the NCAA tournament, 62–61. Among Musselman's teammates at USD were Scott Thompson, a 7-foot center who was drafted in the fourth round by the Washington Bullets in the 1987 NBA draft, and Mike Whitmarsh, who won a silver medal in beach volleyball at the 1996 Summer Olympics in Atlanta.

Musselman was a fifth-round CBA draft choice of the Albany Patroons in 1987.

== Coaching career ==
=== Early coaching career (1989–1997) ===
In the CBA, Musselman posted a 270–122 record (.688), marking the second highest winning percentage in league history behind George Karl, who coached for five seasons in the CBA.

Musselman began his CBA career in 1988 as the general manager of the Rapid City Thrillers, a franchise his father Bill had coached to three consecutive CBA titles during the 1980s. His first week on the job, he hired Flip Saunders as the team's head coach. Saunders, who was recruited by Bill Musselman when Bill was the head coach at the University of Minnesota during the early 1970s, would go on to be one of the winningest coaches in CBA history before moving to the NBA as coach of the Minnesota Timberwolves.

In the 1989–90 season, at age 24, Musselman became the Thrillers head coach. The following season, Musselman joined his father Bill's staff on the NBA's Minnesota Timberwolves as assistant coach making him the youngest front-bench assistant coach in NBA history. Prior to joining the Thrillers, Musselman worked for the NBA's Los Angeles Clippers as an assistant to General Manager Elgin Baylor and Barry Hecker, the team's director of scouting.

From 1990 to 1997, Musselman had 24 players called up to the NBA, the highest number in the league during that span. He holds the distinction of being the only person in CBA history to coach in five league All-Star Games (1990, 1992, 1993, 1994, 1997) and was the first coach in professional basketball history to win 100 games by the age of 28. When he was 23, Musselman became the youngest coach in CBA history.

Musselman also served as head coach of the Florida Sharks of the United States Basketball League (USBL). In the summers of 1995 and 1996, he coached the Sharks to a combined 53–3 record (.946, including playoffs) and back-to-back USBL Championships. Musselman was selected as USBL Coach of the Year in 1996. He holds the highest winning percentage in league history.

=== Orlando Magic, Atlanta Hawks assistant (1998–2002) ===
Musselman was an assistant coach for the Orlando Magic from 1998 to 2000 under Chuck Daly and Doc Rivers who would go on to be named NBA Coach of the Year in the 1999–00 season, then also for the Atlanta Hawks from 2000 to 2002 under Lon Kruger.

=== Golden State Warriors (2002–2004) ===
In 2002, Musselman was named the head coach of the Golden State Warriors, a position he held for two years. He finished as runner-up to San Antonio's Gregg Popovich in NBA Coach of the Year Award voting in 2002–2003 with 231 points, including 26 first-place votes. That season, under Musselman's guidance, the Warriors, for the first time in nearly a decade, reached the .500 mark late in the season, holding a record of 30–30 on March 4, 2003. In Musselman's rookie season, his club finished 38–44, the most wins in more than 10 years.

Despite numerous injuries and the loss of the team's top two players in Gilbert Arenas (signed with Washington) and Antawn Jamison (traded to Dallas), the team still finished 37–45 under his direction during the 2003–2004 season. In two seasons as head coach in Golden State, Musselman compiled a 75–89 record. Nevertheless, he was let go after the 2004 season ended when Chris Mullin took over as the team's general manager.

Musselman's .457 winning percentage with Golden State ranks 10th all-time among Warriors coaches, behind Steve Kerr (.709 through 2019–2020), Neil Johnson (.617), Frank McGuire (.613), George Senesky (.551), Bill Sharman (.534), Al Attles (.518), Don Nelson (.487), Mark Jackson (.473) and George Lee (.470).

=== Memphis Grizzlies assistant (2004–2006) ===
After his two seasons as head coach of the Golden State Warriors, Musselman was an assistant coach for the Memphis Grizzlies under Mike Fratello from 2004 to 2006.

=== Sacramento Kings (2006–2007) ===
On June 2, 2006, Musselman was named head coach of the Sacramento Kings, replacing Rick Adelman. Four months into the job, on October 21, 2006, Musselman was cited for DUI in Sacramento. At the time, Musselman said, "Alcohol has never been a big part of my life. I don't allow it in my house. My sons have never seen me take a sip of anything." According to Ailine Voisin, a sports columnist for The Sacramento Bee, "[Musselman] drinks so infrequently, in fact, that he can count the number of beers he consumes per month."

In the first month of the season (November 2006) with Musselman at the helm, the Kings went 8–5. But the team slumped in December and January, posting a 10–21 record before going 7–6 in February 2007. The Kings finished 33–49 on the season.

Musselman was fired by Sacramento President of Basketball Operations Geoff Petrie on April 20, 2007.

=== NBA D-League (2010–2012) ===
On August 11, 2010, Musselman was named head coach of the NBA Development League's Reno Bighorns. Under his watch, several players, including Marcus Landry, Jeremy Lin, Courtney Fortson, Donald Sloan and Hassan Whiteside were called up to the NBA and the Bighorns finished 34–16 and first in the D-League Western Conference.

Musselman was named head coach of the Los Angeles D-Fenders on August 18, 2011. Sports Illustrated called Musselman one of the "best teachers" in the D-League. During the 2011–12 season, he guided the team to a 38–12 record, the best mark in league history. The D-Fenders, who finished with the best defensive FG percentage in the league, advanced to the D-League finals before losing to the Austin Toros, in a three-game series. In April 2012, Musselman was named the 2011–12 D-League Coach of the Year. A month later, in May 2012, the D-Fenders were named the 2011–12 NBA D-League Development Champion, which recognizes "the team that best embodies the NBA D-League's goals of developing NBA basketball talent via call-ups and assignments."

=== Arizona State assistant (2012–2014) ===
On August 30, 2012, Andy Katz reported on ESPN.com's College Basketball Nation Blog that Arizona State University was in talks to hire Musselman as an assistant coach on Herb Sendek's staff. On September 2, 2012, Katz confirmed Musselman's hiring, describing it as a "bold move" and a "coup" for Sendek.

Former NBA coach Jeff Van Gundy predicted that Musselman will be an excellent recruiter "because of his competitive nature and what he has to sell. This is a guy who can tell kids exactly what it takes to play in the NBA."

Fifteen games into Arizona State's 2012–13 season, ESPN's Andy Katz wrote that "It's hard to ignore the difference [guard Jahii] Carson and assistant coach Eric Musselman are making at Arizona State." According to Katz, "The Sun Devils were painful to watch last season. Now, ASU has multiple options and while it still grinds out wins (see OT game in the 50s to beat Utah), the Sun Devils are 2–0 in the Pac-12 and 13–2 heading to the Oregon schools." On January 9, 2013, ESPN's Jason King wrote that "adding former NBA head coach Eric Musselman...to his staff has also been a huge plus for Sendek and his players." Quoted in King's story, Arizona State center Jordan Bachynski said, "When [Musselman and Greer] speak, guys listen, just because they have that credibility from being in the league. The way they approach the game … it's no BS. They say, 'This is how it's done. If you don't like it, you're not going to play.'"

In a radio interview after the 2012–13 season, Arizona State athletic director Steve Patterson said, "I think Eric's going to have opportunities to look at head coaching jobs. He's a very qualified coach. He did a great job, I think, teaching and working here."

In a March 26, 2013, post on the ESPN Los Angeles UCLA blog, Peter Yoon described Musselman as one of the "best under-the-radar candidates out there."

In May 2013, he was promoted to associate head coach. Musselman resigned from Sendek's staff in April 2014.

In two seasons with the Sun Devils, Musselman helped ASU to the NIT Tournament in 2013 and the NCAA tournament in 2014. The team went 21–12 in both seasons.

=== LSU assistant (2014–2015) ===
Following the 2013–14 season, Musselman was a candidate for the head coaching position at the University of California, Berkeley, the University of South Florida and Oregon State University.

In June 2014, Musselman became associate head coach at LSU under Johnny Jones. In Musselman's one season with the Tigers, LSU went 22–10 and reached the NCAA tournament, losing to North Carolina State, 66–65, in the first round.

=== Nevada (2015–19) ===
On March 25, 2015, the University of Nevada, Reno hired Musselman as head coach for the Nevada Wolf Pack team.

In early March 2016, Bleacher Report named Musselman the Mountain West Coach of the Year after guiding the Wolf Pack to an 18–12 record, a 9-win improvement over the previous season. The team's winning percentage jumped from 31 to 60, which ranked as the 11th best improvement nationally.

Following the 2015–16 season, Nevada was invited to play in the College Basketball Invitational (CBI), winning its first three games to improve its season record to 21–12 and advance to the CBI championship series vs Morehead State. According to Chris Murray, a reporter who covered the team for the Reno Gazette-Journal, "No coach in Nevada basketball history has done a better job of getting everything out of the talent on the roster. It might be the best coaching job in Wolf Pack hoops history."

Nevada's 2016 recruiting class was ranked as the 35th best in the nation by 247Sports.

Musselman's 2016–17 Wolf Pack team went 14–4 in conference play to win the Mountain West regular season title. The team also won the 2017 MWC postseason tournament championship to earn a bid in the NCAA men's basketball tournament. Nevada finished 28–7 overall for the season, tied for the second-most wins in school history.

In December 2017, Musselman's Nevada team was ranked in the top 25, the first time since 2007 that the Wolf Pack had ranked among the top 25 teams nationally. Musselman was named 2017–18 Mountain West Coach of the Year after guiding the Wolf Pack to a 15–3 conference record and the MWC regular season title. He was also named the Coach of the Year for District 17 by the National Association of Basketball Coaches. The team set a school record for most wins in a season.

In March 2018, Nevada was announced as an at-large selection for the NCAA men's basketball tournament as a seventh seed. In their first-round game, the Wolf Pack came back from 14 points down to defeat Texas, 87–83. In Round 2, Nevada rallied from a 22-point deficit to upset second-seeded Cincinnati, 75–73, propelling the Wolf Pack to its second Sweet 16 appearance in school history.

During the 2017–18 season, Nevada finished 12–3 in true road games. Those 12 victories were a single-season school record and tied for most in the country.

In May 2018 Musselman and staff signed ESPN's 31st ranked recruit in the 2018 class Jordan Brown. Brown became the highest-ranked recruit to commit to Nevada since Reno native Luke Babbitt pledged to play for his local school in 2008.

On September 5, 2018, the Nevada athletics department announced that season tickets for the upcoming men's basketball season were officially sold out.

To start the 2018–19 season, Nevada, Reno was ranked #7 in the preseason Associated Press poll and #9 in the USA Today Coaches Poll. It is the highest ranking in school history for the Wolf Pack. The previous top ranking was #9 on February 26, 2007. Additionally, the #7 ranking was the highest preseason ranking in Mountain West Conference history. The Nevada Wolf Pack finished the year ranked in the Associated Press Top 25 all 20 weeks of the college basketball season, with the highest ranking in school history coming in week 4 with a #5 AP ranking.

On November 6, Nevada opened the season with an 86–70 victory over BYU. Caroline scored a game-high 25 points, with 21 coming in the second half. Nevada opened the season with the only starting lineup in college basketball consisting of all fifth-year seniors.

On November 27, the Wolf Pack avenged their Sweet 16 loss in March to Loyola-Chicago by defeating Loyola, 79–65, in Chicago. The Pack, now ranked No. 5 in the country, was led by Caleb Martin (21 points) and Cody Martin (20 points).

A week later, Nevada, Reno rallied in the 2nd half to defeat #20 Arizona State 72–66 in the Staples Center in Los Angeles, California. In front of the 12th-largest crowd in Lawlor Events Center History, the Wolf Pack honored its Seniors beating San Diego State 81–53, and earning its third straight Mountain West Conference regular season title.

The Pack became the third team in Mountain West Conference history to win three straight regular season conference titles.

Nevada's 2018–19 season shattered the all-time attendance record at Lawlor Events Center. The season total of 163,169 broke the former record set in 2005–06 of 150,674, and doing it in 3 less games. Additionally, the average home game attendance of 10,878, broke the record set previous year (2017–18), of 9,048.

Musselman joined Mark Few (Gonzaga), Dave Rose (BYU), Steve Fisher (SDSU), Steve Alford (New Mexico), and Shaka Smart (VCU), as recent mid-major coaches with four-year spans of 25+ wins per season, 3+ tournament appearances, 2+ tournament wins, and at least one week in AP Top 10.

After finishing the year with an overall record of 29–5, Musselman received one vote for AP Coach of the Year (tied 11th).

=== Arkansas (2019–2024) ===
Musselman was named Arkansas head coach on April 7, 2019.

His team got off to an 8–0 start heading into December, the school's best start to a season since the 1997–98 season. The Razorbacks went 11–1 in non-conference play going in to their conference schedule. They headed into SEC play with a 71–64 win on the road at Indiana University. Arkansas defeated TCU 78–67 at home in the mid season SEC vs Big 12 Challenge. Arkansas at that point had gone 3–3 in SEC play with wins over Vandy and Texas A&M at home, and Ole Miss on the road. Losses were to LSU and MSU on the road, and a loss at home to Kentucky. Arkansas was 16–5 (4–4) when they lost their 2nd leading scorer for a five-game stretch, where they posted a 0–5 record. At full strength over the final six games, the Razorbacks finished the season 4–2. Musselman, in his first year at Arkansas recruited the fifth and sixth-ranked recruiting class in the nation according to ESPN.com and 247sports.com respectively.

The season was cut short after a Wednesday victory at the 2020 SEC tournament due to COVID-19 pandemic concerns. The Razorbacks ended their season with a 20–12 record overall marking Musselman's fifth straight season with 20 or more wins.

Following the 2019–20 season, Musselman and staff reeled in the No. 3 ranked transfer recruiting class after three top 25 ranked graduate transfers signed with the Razorbacks.

Late in the 2020–21 season, his Razorbacks cracked the Top 25 for the first time since January 2018 and then hosted No. 6 Alabama as the No. 20 ranked team, the first matchup of ranked teams inside Bud Walton Arena since February 1998. On March 8, 2021, the Razorbacks entered the top 10 of the AP poll for the first time since February 1995, checking in at No. 8 heading into the postseason. Musselman was named one of 10 semifinalists for the 2021 Werner Ladder Naismith Men's Coach of the Year. Musselman entered the 2021 NCAA tournament as a #3 Seed, the highest seed for Arkansas since the 1994–95 national runner-up. On March 21, 2021, Musselman led Arkansas to its first Sweet 16 since 1996 in a 2-point win over 6-seed Texas Tech. Musselman ended the Cinderella run of 15-seed Oral Roberts on March 27, 2021, to advance Arkansas to its first Elite 8 since 1995. The Razorbacks finished the season ranked #10 in the final AP Men's Basketball Poll and #6 in the USA Today Coaches Poll.

On February 8, 2022, his team knocked off No. 1 Auburn in front of a then Bud Walton Arena record 20,327 in attendance. As Arkansas had not beaten a number 1 team at BWA, the students rushed the court, resulting in Arkansas paying a $250,000 fine. Arkansas entered the 2022 NCAA tournament as #4 seed. Arkansas beat New Mexico State to be the only SEC program to advance to the Sweet 16 of the 2022 NCAA tournament. Musselman followed that by knocking off #1 overall ranked Gonzaga to advance to the Elite 8, making the first time an Arkansas coach took the Razorbacks to back-to-back Elite 8 appearances since Nolan Richardson in 1994 and 1995. The Razorbacks would fall in the Elite 8 to Duke in head coach Mike Krzyzewski's 43rd and final season. Arkansas finished ranked #17 in the final AP Poll and #8 in the final USA Today Coaches Poll. His coaching career at Arkansas was further propelled into success with his 2022 recruiting class, which featured several five-star recruits like Anthony Black (basketball), Nick Smith Jr., and Jordan Walsh.

On March 18, 2023, Musselman's 8th-seeded Razorbacks knocked off a No. 1 seed and defending national champion Kansas in the Round of 32 to advance to the Sweet 16 for a third consecutive season. They would lose to eventual national champion UConn in the regional semifinals in Las Vegas.

In his fifth season, Arkansas struggled throughout SEC play after beating Duke in the non-conference, breaking the Bud Walton Arena attendance record in that game for the second time in his tenure. The team finished with a losing record overall, the first time Arkansas had done that since 2009–10.

=== USC ===
On April 4, 2024, Musselman was hired as the head coach at the University of Southern California, replacing Andy Enfield, who departed for the job at SMU.

== Head coaching record ==
=== NBA ===
Legend
Regular season	G	Games coached	W	Games won	L	Games lost	W–L %	Win–loss %
Playoffs	PG	Playoff games	PW	Playoff wins	PL	Playoff losses	PW–L %	Playoff win–loss %

Team	Year	G	W	L	W–L%	Finish	PG	PW	PL	PW–L%	Result
Golden State	2002–03	82	38	44	.463	6th in Pacific	—	—	—	—	Missed playoffs
Golden State	2003–04	82	37	45	.451	5th in Pacific	—	—	—	—	Missed playoffs
Sacramento	2006–07	82	33	49	.402	5th in Pacific	—	—	—	—	Missed playoffs
Career		246	108	138	.439		—	—	—	—	

=== College ===
Record table
Season	Team	Overall	Conference	Standing	Postseason
Nevada Wolf Pack (Mountain West Conference) (2015–2019)
2015–16	Nevada	24–14	10–8	T–4th	CBI champions
2016–17	Nevada	28–7	14–4	1st	NCAA Division I Round of 64
2017–18	Nevada	29–8	15–3	1st	NCAA Division I Sweet 16
2018–19	Nevada	29–5	15–3	1st	NCAA Division I Round of 64
Nevada:		110–34 (.764)	54–18 (.750)		
Arkansas Razorbacks (Southeastern Conference) (2019–2024)
2019–20	Arkansas	20–12	7–11	T–10th	postseason cancelled
2020–21	Arkansas	25–7	13–4	2nd	NCAA Division I Elite Eight
2021–22	Arkansas	28–9	13–5	4th	NCAA Division I Elite Eight
2022–23	Arkansas	22–14	8–10	T–9th	NCAA Division I Sweet 16
2023–24	Arkansas	16–17	6–12	T–11th	
Arkansas:		111–59 (.653)	47–42 (.528)		
USC Trojans (Big Ten Conference) (2024–present)
2024–25	USC	17–18	7–13	T–12th	CBC Quarterfinals
2025–26	USC	18–14	7–13	T–12th	
2026–27	USC	5–0	0–0		
USC:		40–32 (.556)	14–26 (.350)		
Total:		261–125 (.676)			
National champion Postseason invitational champion Conference regular season champion Conference regular season and conference tournament champion Division regular season champion Division regular season and conference tournament champion Conference tournament champion

=== Others ===
Year	Team	Season Record	Playoff record	Key Players
1989–90	Rapid City Thrillers (CBA)	42–14 (.750)	8–8	Keith Smart, Jarvis Basnight, Jim Thomas, Pat Durham, Micheal Williams, Conner Henry, Michael Higgins
1991–92	Rapid City Thrillers (CBA)	37–19 (.660)	9–7	Fennis Dembo, Joe Ward, Stephen Thompson, Fred Cofield, Carlton McKinney, Craig Neal, Nikita Wilson, Pat Cummings, Leon Wood
1992–93	Rapid City Thrillers (CBA)	44–12 (.785)	5–3	Shelton Jones, Cliff Robinson, Stanley Brundy, Craig Neal, Larry Robinson
1993–94	Rapid City Thrillers (CBA)	37–19 (.660)	5–5	Byron Dinkins, Gerald Paddio, John Morton, Wes Matthews, Tom Garrick, George Ackles
1994–95	Rapid City Thrillers (CBA)	31–25 (.553)	0–2	Wayne Tinkle, Corey Crowder, Greg Grant, Billy Thompson, Duane Washington, Ben Coleman, Lester Conner
1995	Florida/Bradenton Sharks (USBL)	24–2 (.923)	1–0	Nate Johnston, Charles E. Smith, Dexter Boney, Darvin Ham, Mark Hughes, Sylvester Gray, Kevin Salvadori
1995–96	Florida/West Palm Beachdogs (CBA)	41–15 (.732)	5–3	Manute Bol, Stanley Jackson, Herb Jones, Rodney Monroe, Keith Smart, Charles E. Smith
1996	Florida/Bradenton Sharks (USBL)	25–1 (.961)	3–0	Mark Boyd, Jarvis Lang, Larry Lewis, Dwayne Morton, Dexter Boney
1996–97	Florida/West Palm Beachdogs (CBA)	38–18 (.678)	7–6	Terrence Rencher, Rodney Monroe, Anthony Tucker, Anthony Miller, Ernest Hall, Mark Macon
2010	Dominican Republic National Team	5–1 (.833)	N/A	Charlie Villanueva, Ronald Ramon, Kelvin Pena, Jack Michael Martinez
2010–11	Reno Bighorns (D-League)	34–16 (.680)	2–3	Jeremy Lin, Bobby Simmons, Patrick Ewing Jr., Marcus Landry, Danny Green, Aaron Miles, D. J. Strawberry, Steve Novak, Salim Stoudamire, Patrick O'Bryant, Nick Fazekas
2011	Venezuela national basketball team	12–9 (.571)	N/A	Greivis Vásquez, Óscar Torres, Héctor Romero
2011–12	Los Angeles D-Fenders (D-League)	38–12 (.760)	5–2	Gerald Green, Jamaal Tinsley, Kareem Rush, Courtney Fortson, Malcolm Thomas, Darius Morris, Andrew Goudelock, Derrick Caracter, Christian Eyenaga, Jamario Moon, Ish Smith
2012	Venezuela national basketball team	7–4	N/A	Greivis Vásquez, Óscar Torres, Héctor Romero

== Coaching style ==
On his blog, Musselman wrote about the importance of matching an offense to the "team's make up." Depending on the roster, a half-court offense might make more sense. In other cases, a team may be better suited for an "open offense." According to Musselman, the idea is to allow players to "play to their strengths."

As head coach of the Golden State Warriors, Musselman would often use "three-guard rotations to create mismatches and fast-break opportunities for his club." As head coach of the Venezuela National Team, Musselman said his team's identity was that of a "fast-paced, up-tempo team."

According to former NBA coach Jeff Van Gundy, Musselman is "as competitive of a guy as I've ever coached against. He's a brilliant offensive mind."

According to University of Kentucky head coach John Calipari, "Eric is one of the best in our sport. Extremely driven and knowledgeable. I've watched and coached against him in the NBA and FIBA games. He has an uncanny feel for the game, and ability to read where the game is at. More importantly, is his ability to motivate and teach his players what it takes to improve and win. He is as good as it gets."

=== Player development ===
In an August 2011 interview on NBA.com, Musselman said that, as a coach, "you have to continually figure out a way to get your players better." According to Gerald Green, who played for Musselman with the D-League's Los Angeles D-Fenders in 2012, Musselman "did a hell of a job really motivating me, really pushing me every day in practice when I was with L.A. I have to give him credit [for improving my game]." Green said that Musselman "rode me about staying focused. Don’t take even a second off of any play. Don’t take any plays off. Don’t take practice for granted."

Like Green, Jeremy Lin has also credited Musselman with aiding his development. In February 2012, Lin said that when he played for Musselman in the D-League, "he gave me the opportunity to play through mistakes."

Gregory Echenique, who played for Musselman on the Venezuela National Team in 2011, said Musselman "had the most energy of any coach I've ever been around. He had a problem with his Achilles, and he would throw his crutches down and literally crawl to get after you. From the first day we met him to when we left him, his intensity never changed. It didn't matter who you were — he was in your face if he needed to be. At the same time, he was so positive. He always believed we could win. He was the guy that put the fire into us."

Kevin Martin, who played for Musselman with the Sacramento Kings in 2006–07, told NBA.com that Musselman helped him learn how to draw more fouls. According to Martin, Musselman "saw how teams were playing me and how they got up into me and told me to start absorbing that contact. He said I could score a lot more points in this league if I got to the free throw line. He put an emphasis on me night in night out with that part of the game. He was always pounding it into me and it paid off."

In a May 9, 2013, article by CBSSports.com college basketball writer Gary Parrish, Arizona State guard Jahii Carson credited Musselman with helping him develop as a player. "Coach Muss is a great guy with a lot of knowledge because he's coached a lot of great players", said Carson. "He's given me a lot of great advice … about what NBA people are looking for, about how NBA guys don't take days off, how they're always in the gym doing conditioning or something, always trying to better their games. A guy like me? I didn't know anything like that having never been around the NBA game. So, he's somebody who has helped me."

During the 2013–14 season, Musselman worked with Arizona State center Jordan Bachynski, helping the 7-foot-2 senior with his footwork. After the season, Bachynski earned Pac-12 Defensive Player of the Year honors.

== International coaching ==
In July 2009, Musselman reportedly turned down an offer to coach Spartak St. Petersburg in Russia. On May 19, 2010, Musselman was named head coach of the Dominican Republic national basketball team.

At the 2010 Men's Centro Basketball Championship in July 2010, FIBA Americas' top regional tournament, Musselman guided the Dominican Republic team to the gold medal game, losing to Puerto Rico, 89–80, the team's only loss of the tournament (5–1). By finishing second at the Centro Basketball Championship, the Dominican Republic qualifies for the 2011 FIBA Americas Championship, a qualifying tournament for the FIBA World Championships and the Olympic Games.

In August 2010, Musselman coached the U.S. 2011 team to the gold medal at the Adidas Global Experience in Chicago. The 2011 team is composed of the top high school seniors in the U.S. The tournament featured the world's top 18-and-under players from five regions of the world: Africa, Asia, Europe, Latin America, and the United States. Musselman was the head coach of Team China at the 2009 Adidas Nations camp/tournament in Beijing, China.

In May 2011, the FIBA World Championship website reported that Musselman had interviewed for the head coaching position of the Puerto Rico men's national basketball team. Earlier that month, he was mentioned as a candidate for the Venezuela national basketball team. On June 15, 2011, Musselman was named head coach of the Venezuela national basketball team.

Under Musselman, Venezuela qualified for the 2012 World Pre-Olympic Qualifier by going 4–4 at the FIBA Americas 2011 Pre-Olympic Qualifier in Mar del Plata, Argentina. Venezuela was the top-scoring team in the tournament, averaging 94.8 points per game, 9 points more than the second highest-scoring team. Venezuela went 8–5 in international exhibition games ("friendlies") leading up to the tournament.

Musselman guided Venezuela to a runner-up (silver) finish at the 2012 FIBA Men's South American Championship, posting a 3–2 record. With the second-place finish, Venezuela advanced to the 2013 FIBA Americas Championship, qualifier to the 2014 FIBA World Championship. The team went 1–1 in the 2012 FIBA Olympic qualifying tournament, defeating the Nigeria national team, the team that ultimately advanced to the 2012 Summer Olympics. Venezuela was also 3–1 in friendly games and won the 2012 Super 4 in Puerto la Cruz, Venezuela.

== Sports broadcasting career ==
From 2008 to 2010, he served as an NBA analyst for FOX Sports Radio and Clear Channel Radio, and as a color commentator for college basketball games on the regional sports network Comcast SportsNet California and for NBA Development League games on Versus. He's also worked as a basketball analyst for ESPN.

== Personal life ==
Musselman and his wife Danyelle Sargent, a former on-air personality and anchor for ESPN, FOX Sports, and the NFL Network, have a daughter together. Musselman has two sons from a previous marriage. Michael currently serves as the Director of Recruiting for University of Arkansas' Men's Basketball team. Matthew attends the University of San Diego. They live in Fayetteville, Arkansas. Musselman's sister, Nicole, is a fashion designer in Dallas, Texas.

=== Blog ===
In November 2007, Musselman launched a blog called "Eric Musselman's Basketball Notebook." It features more than 1,200 posts about coaching and leadership. His last post was on March 20, 2009. Several of the posts from Musselman's blog were reposted on The Fifth Down, the New York Times' NFL blog.
