= Miami Heat draft history =

Overview of the Miami Heat's draft history

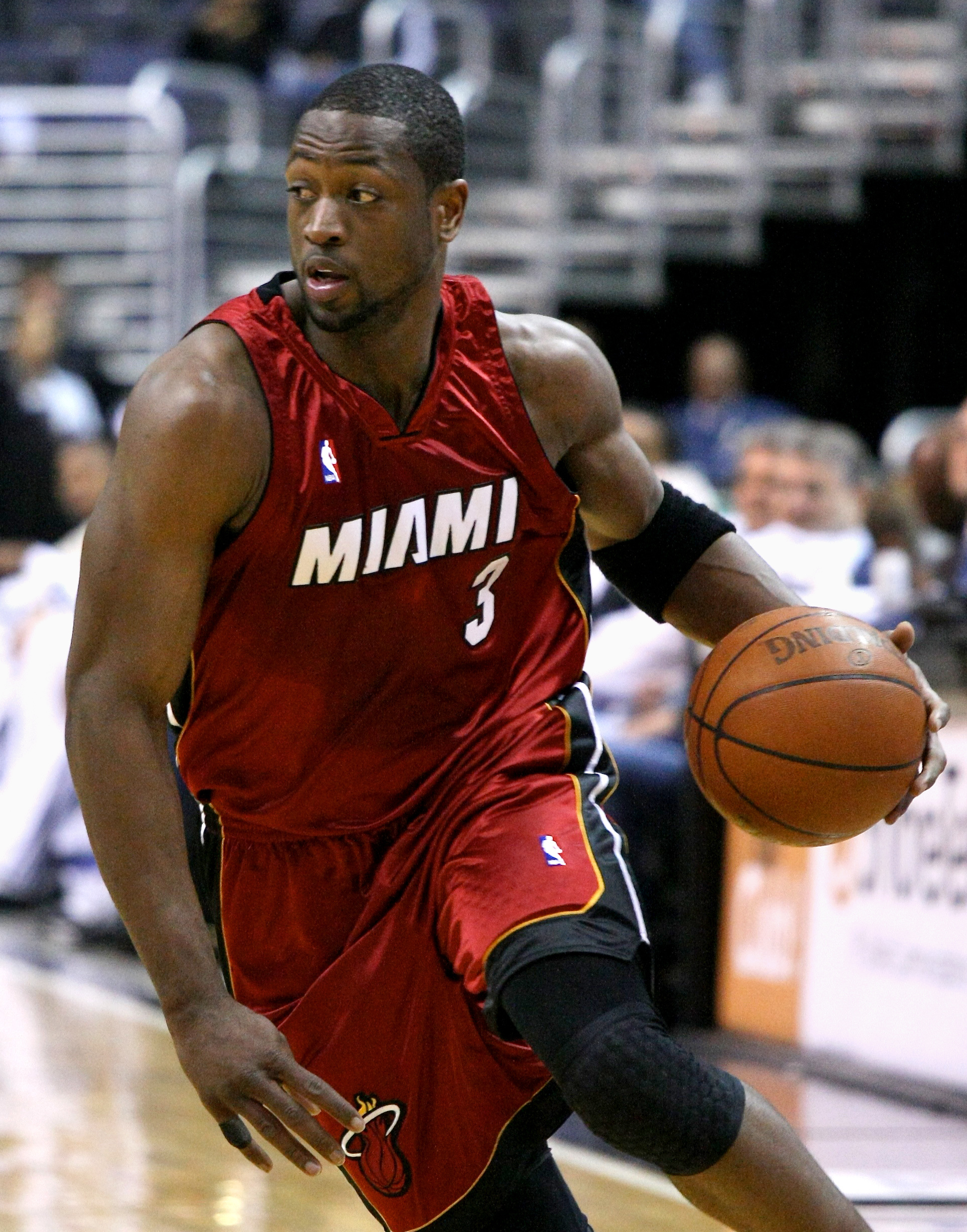
Dwyane Wade won the NBA Finals MVP en route to helping the Heat win its first NBA Championship.

The Miami Heat are an American professional basketball team based in Miami, Florida. They play in the Southeast Division of the Eastern Conference of the National Basketball Association (NBA).

The Heat first participated in the NBA draft on June 28, 1988, about five months before their inaugural NBA season. In 1989, the NBA agreed with the National Basketball Players' Association to limit drafts to two rounds, an arrangement that has remained the same up the present time. Before each draft, an NBA draft lottery determines the first round selection order for the teams that missed the playoffs during the prior season. Teams can also trade their picks, which means that in some drafts teams may have more or less than two draft picks, although they must have at least one first-round pick every other year.

== Key ==
Abbreviation	Meaning	Abbreviation	Meaning
Nat	Nationality	Pos	Position
SG	Shooting guard	F	Forward
SF	Small forward	PF	Power forward
C	Center		

Naismith Basketball Hall of Famer	First overall NBA draft pick	Selected for an NBA All-Star Game

== Selections ==
Year	Round	Pick	Player	Nationality	Position	College/High School/Club
1988	1	9	Rony Seikaly	LIB	C	Syracuse
1988	1	20	Kevin Edwards (from Dallas)^{[a]}	USA	SG	DePaul
1988	2	33	Grant Long	USA	F	Eastern Michigan
1988	2	35	Sylvester Gray (from New York via Chicago, Seattle, and Boston)^{[b]}	USA	SF	Memphis
1988	2	40	Orlando Graham (from Seattle)^{[c]}	USA	PF	Auburn–Montgomery
1988	3	59	Nate Johnston	USA	PF	Tampa
1989	1	4	Glen Rice	USA	SF	Michigan
1989	2	28	Sherman Douglas	USA	PG	Syracuse
1989	2	45	Scott Haffner (from Seattle via Milwaukee)^{[d]}	USA	PG	Evansville
1990	1	9	Willie Burton (from Washington, via Dallas and Denver)^{[e]}	USA	PG	Minnesota
1990	1	15	Dave Jamerson (from Denver,^{[e]} traded to Houston)^{[f]}	USA	SG	Ohio
1990	2	30	Carl Herrera (traded to Houston)^{[f]}	TRI	SF	Houston
1991	1	5	Steve Smith	USA	SG	Michigan State
1991	2	29	George Ackles	USA	C	UNLV
1992	1	12	Harold Miner	USA	SG	USC
1992	2	37	Isaiah Morris (traded to Detroit)^{[g]}	USA	PF	Arkansas
1992	2	42	Matt Geiger (from L.A. Lakers)^{[h]}	USA	C	Georgia Tech
1993	2	35	Ed Stokes (traded to Washington)^{[i]}	USA	C	Arizona
1994	1	12	Khalid Reeves	USA	G	Arizona
1994	2	40	Jeff Webster (traded to Washington)^{[i]}	USA	F	Oklahoma
1995	1	10	Kurt Thomas	USA	F	TCU
1995	2	42	George Banks	USA	F	UTEP
1997	1	26	Charles Smith	USA	G	New Mexico
1997	2	31	Mark Sanford	USA	F	Washington
1998	2	51	Corey Brewer	USA	G	Oklahoma
1999	1	25	Tim James	USA	F	Miami (FL)
1999	2	53	Rodney Buford	USA	G	Creighton
2000	2	37	Eddie House (from Cleveland via Denver)^{[j]}	USA	G	Arizona State
2000	2	52	Ernest Brown	USA	C	Indian Hills Community College
2001	2	49	Ken Johnson	USA	C	Ohio State
2002	1	10	Caron Butler	USA	SF	Connecticut
2002	2	53	Rasual Butler (from Detroit via Toronto and Houston)^{[k]}	USA	SF	La Salle
2003	1	5	Dwyane Wade	USA	G	Marquette
2003	2	33	Jerome Beasley	USA	F	North Dakota
2004	1	19	Dorell Wright	USA	SF	Leuzinger (H.S.)
2004	2	47	Pape Sow (traded to Toronto)^{[l]}	SEN	PF	Cal State Fullerton
2004	2	53	Matt Freije (from Dallas)^{[m]}	LIB	SF	Vanderbilt
2005	1	29	Wayne Simien	USA	PF	Kansas
2007	1	20	Jason Smith (traded to Philadelphia)^{[n]}	USA	PF	Colorado State
2007	2	39	Stanko Barać (from Sacramento via Utah and Orlando,^{[o]} traded to Indiana)^{[p]}	CRO	C	HKK Široki (Bosnia and Herzegovina)
2008	1	2	Michael Beasley	USA	PF	Kansas State
2008	2	52	Darnell Jackson (from Orlando,^{[o]} traded to Cleveland)^{[q]}	USA	PF	Kansas
2009	2	43	Marcus Thornton (from Indiana,^{[p]} traded to New Orleans)^{[r]}	USA	SG	LSU
2009	2	60	Robert Dozier	USA	PF	Memphis
2010	2	32	Dexter Pittman (from Minnesota via Oklahoma City)^{[s]}	USA	C	Texas
2010	2	41	Jarvis Varnado (from New Orleans)^{[r]}	USA	PF	Mississippi State
2010	2	42	Da'Sean Butler (from Toronto)^{[t]}	USA	SF	West Virginia
2010	2	48	Latavious Williams (traded to Oklahoma City)^{[u]}	USA	F	Tulsa 66ers (D-League)
2011	2	31	Bojan Bogdanović (from Minnesota, traded to New Jersey via Minnesota)	CRO	SF/SG	Cibona Zagreb (Croatia)
2012	1	27	Arnett Moultrie (traded to Philadelphia)^{[w]}	USA	PF	Mississippi St.
2014	1	26	P. J. Hairston (traded to Charlotte)^{[y]}	USA	G	North Carolina
2014	2	55	Semaj Christon (traded to Oklahoma City^{[z]} via Charlotte)^{[y]}	USA	PG	Xavier
2015	1	10	Justise Winslow	USA	SF	Duke
2015	2	40	Josh Richardson	USA	SG	Tennessee
2017	1	14	Bam Adebayo	USA	PF/C	Kentucky
2019	2	44	Bol Bol (traded to Denver)^{[y]}	SUD	C	Oregon
2019	1	13	Tyler Herro	USA	SG	Kentucky
2019	2	32	KZ Okpala (from Phoenix)	USA	F	Stanford
2020	1	20	Precious Achiuwa	NGA	F	Memphis
2022	1	27	Nikola Jović	SRB	F	Mega Mozzart (Serbia)
2023	1	18	Jaime Jaquez Jr.	USA	F	UCLA
2024	1	15	Kel'el Ware	USA	C	Indiana
2024	2	43	Nikola Đurišić (traded to Atlanta)^{[aa]}	SRB	SF/SG	Mega Mozzart (Serbia)
2025	1	20	Kasparas Jakučionis	LIT	PG	Illinois
2026	2	41	Otega Oweh (from Golden State via Charlotte, New York, Oklahoma City, and Atlanta, traded to Oklahoma City)^{[ab]}	USA	SG	Kentucky

== Notes ==
- ^{a} On June 23, 1988, the Heat received the 1988 NBA draft first-round draft pick from the Dallas Mavericks for not picking centers Bill Wennington and Uwe Blab or guard Steve Alford in the 1988 NBA expansion draft.
- ^{b} On October 30, 1986, the New York Knicks traded the 1988 NBA Draft second-round pick along with the Denver's 1987 NBA draft first-round pick to the Chicago Bulls for center Jawann Oldham.
  On June 22, 1987, the Chicago Bulls traded the New York's 1988 NBA Draft second-round pick along with the draft rights to center Olden Polynice and the Chicago's 1989 NBA Draft first-round pick to the Seattle SuperSonics for the draft rights to forward Scottie Pippen and the Seattle's 1989 NBA Draft first-round pick.
  On October 16, 1987, the Seattle SuperSonics traded the New York's 1988 NBA Draft second-round pick along with an undisclosed amount of cash to the Boston Celtics for guard Sam Vincent and forward Scott Wedman.
  On June 23, 1988, the Boston Celtics traded the New York's 1988 NBA Draft second-round draft pick to the Miami Heat for not selecting guard Dennis Johnson in the 1988 NBA Expansion Draft.
- ^{c} On June 23, 1988, the Heat received the 1988 NBA Draft second-round draft pick from the Seattle SuperSonics for not selecting guard Danny Young in the 1988 NBA Expansion Draft.
- ^{d} On July 1, 1987, the Seattle SuperSonics traded center Jack Sikma, along with the 1987 NBA Draft second-round pick and 1989 NBA draft second-round pick to the Milwaukee Bucks for center Alton Lister, 1987 NBA Draft first-round pick and 1989 NBA Draft first-round pick.
  On June 23, 1988, the Heat traded forward Fred Roberts to the Milwaukee Bucks for a 1989 second-round draft pick.
- ^{e 1} ^{2} On June 22, 1990, the Heat traded the 1990 NBA Draft first-round pick (#3 selection) to the Denver Nuggets for two 1990 NBA Draft first-round picks (#9 and #15 selections).
- ^{f 1} ^{2} On June 27, 1990, the Heat traded the draft rights to Dave Jamerson and Carl Herrera to the Houston Rockets for the draft rights to Alec Kessler.
- ^{g} On September 8, 1992, the Heat traded the 1993 NBA Draft first-round pick along with the draft rights to Isaiah Morris to the Detroit Pistons in exchange for center John Salley.
- ^{h} On June 23, 1988, the Heat received the 1992 NBA Draft second-round draft pick from the Los Angeles Lakers for not selecting center Kareem Abdul-Jabbar in the 1988 NBA Expansion Draft.
- ^{i 1} ^{2} On June 28, 1995, the Heat traded the draft rights to center Ed Stokes and forward Jeff Webster to the Washington Bullets in exchange for guard Rex Chapman and the draft rights to guard Terrence Rencher.
- ^{j} On June 27, 2000, the Heat acquired forward Chris Gatling and the 37th selection in the 2000 NBA draft from the Denver Nuggets in exchange for guard Voshon Lenard and forward Mark Strickland. Previously, on October 20, 1997, Denver acquired this 2000 second round pick along with guard Sherman Douglas from the Cleveland Cavaliers in exchange for guard Greg Graham.
- ^{k} On July 18, 2001, the Detroit Pistons traded their 2002 second round picks to the Toronto Raptors in exchange for Željko Rebrača. Later, on August 2, 2001, the Raptors traded one of these 2002 second round picks along with their 2002 first-round pick to the Houston Rockets in exchange for Hakeem Olajuwon. The Rockets swapped second round picks with the Heat on draft day in 2002.
- ^{l} On June 24, 2004, the Heat traded the draft rights to Pape Sow and the 2005 NBA Draft second-round pick to the Toronto Raptors for the draft rights to Albert Miralles.
- ^{m} On August 22, 2001, the Heat traded Tim Hardaway to the Dallas Mavericks for the 2004 NBA Draft second-round pick.
- ^{n} On June 28, 2007, the Heat traded the draft rights to 20th pick Jason Smith to the Philadelphia 76ers in exchange for the draft rights to 21st pick Daequan Cook, a 2009 second-round draft pick and cash considerations.
- ^{o 1} ^{2} On June 7, 2007, the Heat received Sacramento's 2007 and Orlando's 2008 second-round draft picks from Orlando as part of the hiring of Stan Van Gundy as Orlando's head coach. Previously, Orlando received Sacramento's second-round draft pick and DeShawn Stevenson on February 19, 2004, from Utah in exchange for Gordan Giriček. Earlier, Utah acquired 2004 and 2007 second-round draft picks and Keon Clark on August 3, 2003, from Sacramento in exchange for a 2004 second-round draft pick.
- ^{p 1} ^{2} On June 28, 2007, the Heat traded the draft rights to 39th pick Stanko Barać to the Indiana Pacers in exchange for a 2009 second-round draft pick.
- ^{q} On June 26, 2008, the Heat traded Darnell Jackson to the Cleveland Cavaliers in exchange for a 2009 second round pick.
- ^{r 1} ^{2} On June 25, 2009, the Heat received 2010 and 2012 second-round picks from the New Orleans Hornets for the draft rights to Marcus Thornton.
- ^{s} On July 27, 2009, the Minnesota Timberwolves traded Etan Thomas and their 2010 second round picks to the Oklahoma City Thunder in exchange for Chucky Atkins and Damien Wilkins. Later, on June 23, 2010, the Heat traded Daequan Cook and their 2010 first-round pick to the Thunder in exchange for one of these 2010 second round picks.
- ^{t} On June 13, 2009, the Heat traded Shawn Marion, Marcus Banks and cash considerations to the Toronto Raptors for Jermaine O'Neal, Jamario Moon, a future first-round pick and a 2010 second-round pick.
- ^{u} On June 24, 2010, the Heat traded the draft rights to 48th pick Latavious Williams to Oklahoma City Thunder in exchange for a future second-round pick.
- ^{v} On June 23, 2011, the Heat traded the 31st pick, a future second-round pick, and cash considerations to Minnesota Timberwolves in exchange for the 2011 28th pick.
- ^{w} The Philadelphia 76ers acquired the draft rights to 27th pick Arnett Moultrie from the Miami Heat in exchange for the draft rights to 45th pick Justin Hamilton and a future first-round draft pick.
- ^{x} Dwyane Wade is the all-time leading draft pick in points, assist, steals, field goals, free throws, points per game, and steals per game.
- ^{y 1} ^{2} On June 26, 2014, the Heat traded their draft rights to P. J. Hairston and Semaj Christon to the Charlotte Hornets in exchange for Shabazz Napier, a 2019 second round pick, and cash considerations.
- ^{z} On the same draft day in 2014, the Oklahoma City Thunder acquired the draft rights to Semaj Christon from the Charlotte Bobcats in exchange for cash considerations.
- ^{aa} On June 27, 2024, the Heat acquired the draft rights to Pelle Larsson and cash considerations from the Atlanta Hawks in exchange for the draft rights to Nikola Đurišić in a three-team trade involving the Houston Rockets in which Atlanta also sent AJ Griffin to Houston.
- ^{ab} On June 24, 2026, the Heat acquired the draft rights to Ryan Conwell from the Oklahoma City Thunder in exchange for the draft rights to Otega Oweh and cash considerations.
