= Florida Sharks =

- League: USBL
- Founded: 1995
- Dissolved: 1997
- History: Florida Sharks; 1995-1997
- Arena: Manatee Civic Center
- Capacity: 4,000
- Location: Bradenton, Florida
- Team colors: celeste, black, white
- Championships: 2 USBL (1995, 1996)
- Conference titles: 1996

The Florida Sharks was a professional basketball club in the United States Basketball League (USBL) from 1995 to 1997. They won two USBL titles during their three seasons with league.

== History ==
The team was based in Bradenton, Florida. The team debuted in 1995, winning the USBL title by defeating the Atlanta Trojans 109–104 in the final.

In 1996 the Sharks won the USBL again, after beating Atlantic City Seagulls 118–115 in the final. Despite their back-two-back championships the team showed up weakened in 1997 without their key players. As a result, they did not qualify to the USBL play-offs for the first time. The Sharks disbanded at the end of the 1997 season.

They played their home games at the Manatee Civic Center, now known as the Bradenton Area Convention Center, in Bradenton, Florida.

Notable players like former NBAers, Terence Stansbury, Charles Smith, Sylvester Gray, Irving Thomas, Nate Johnston and Wes Matthews played for the franchise.

== Seasons ==
Stagione	League	Name	W	L	%	Place	Play-off	Coach
1995	USBL	Florida Sharks	25	2	92,6	1º	Champions	Eric Musselman
1996	USBL	Florida Sharks	28	1	96,6	1º	Champions	Eric Musselman
1997	USBL	Florida Sharks	9	17	34,6	4º	-	Rory White

== Notable players ==
Note: Flags indicate national team eligibility at FIBA-sanctioned events. Players may hold other non-FIBA nationalities not displayed.

Criteria

To appear in this section a player must have either:

- Set a club record or won an individual award while at the club
- Played at least one official international match for their national team at any time
- Played at least one official NBA match at any time.

- (United States) Terence Stansbury
- (United States) Charles Smith
- (United States) Sylvester Gray
- (United States) Chuck Evans
- (United States) Irving Thomas
- (United States) Jarvis Lang
- (United States) Wes Matthews
- (United States) Stanley Jackson
- (United States) Travis Williams
- (United States) Nate Johnston
- (United States) Kevin Salvadori
- (United States) Darvin Ham

== Rosters ==
=== 1995 season ===
- Charles Smith, Jay Edwards, Sylvester Gray, Larry Lewis, Jesse Salters, Stanley Jackson, Wes Matthews, Louis Rowe, Kevin Salvadori, Travis Williams.

=== 1996 season ===
- Jarvis Lang, Tom Kleinschmidt, Larry Lewis, Dwayne Morton, Charles Smith, Louis Rowe, Daniel Watts, Howard Porter, Jesse Salters, Phil Handy, Roger Crawford, Darvin Ham.

=== 1997 season ===
- James Hunter, Artie Griffin, Mark Neal, Dennis Edwards, Keenan Jourdon, Lorenzo Pearson, Craig Buchanan, Chris Ward, Terence Stansbury, Louis Rowe, Chuck Evans, Howard Porter, Johnny Tyson.

== See also ==
- Miami Majesty
