= Irving Thomas =

American basketball player (born 1966)

Los Angeles Lakers
- Title: Head scout
- League: NBA

Personal information
- Born: January 2, 1966 (age 60) Brooklyn, New York, U.S.
- Listed height: 6 ft 8 in (2.03 m)
- Listed weight: 225 lb (102 kg)

Career information
- High school: Miami Carol City (Miami, Florida)
- College: Kentucky (1986–1988); Florida State (1988–1990)
- NBA draft: 1990: undrafted
- Playing career: 1990–1999
- Position: Power forward
- Number: 30

Career history
- 1990: PAOK
- 1990–1991: Los Angeles Lakers
- 1991–1992: Rapid City Thrillers
- 1992: Birmingham Bandits
- 1992: Tampa Bay Sunblasters
- 1992–1993: Fort Wayne Fury
- 1993: Argal Huesca
- 1993–1994: Dinamo Sassari
- 1994–1995: Basket CRO Lyon
- 1995: Florida Sharks
- 1995–1996: Olimpia Basket Pistoia
- 1996: Virtus Roma
- 1996–1997: Olimpia Basket Pistoia
- 1997–1998: Lineltex Trieste
- 1998–1999: Basket Livorno
- 1999: CB Gran Canaria

Career highlights
- McDonald's All-American (1985); First-team Parade All-American (1985)
- Stats at NBA.com
- Stats at Basketball Reference

Irving Thomas (born January 2, 1966) is an American basketball scout and former player. He spent most of his career playing in Europe in several countries but played one season in the National Basketball Association (NBA) with the Los Angeles Lakers.

A 6'8" power forward from the University of Kentucky and Florida State University played with the Los Angeles Lakers during the 1990-91 NBA season, appearing in 26 games, averaging 1.8 points and 1.4 rebounds per game. Since 2001, he has been a scout for the Lakers.
