= Travis Williams (basketball player) =

American basketball player (born 1969)

Personal information
- Born: May 27, 1969 (age 57) Columbia, South Carolina, U.S.
- Listed height: 6 ft 6 in (1.98 m)
- Listed weight: 215 lb (98 kg)

Career information
- High school: Richland Northeast (Columbia, South Carolina)
- College: South Carolina State (1988–1991)
- NBA draft: 1991: undrafted
- Playing career: 1991–2001
- Position: Small forward
- Number: 32

Career history
- 1991–1994: Fort Wayne Fury
- 1994–1995: Oklahoma City Cavalry
- 1995: Florida Sharks
- 1995–1996: Oklahoma City Cavalry
- 1996: Deportivo Roca
- 1996–1997: Rockford Lightning
- 1997: Florida Beach Dogs
- 1997: Tiburones de Aguadilla
- 1997–1998: Charlotte Hornets
- 1998–1999: Quad City Thunder
- 1999: Charlotte Hornets
- 1999: Maratonistas de Coamo
- 1999–2000: Kombassan Konya
- 2000–2001: Poliform Cantù
- Stats at NBA.com
- Stats at Basketball Reference
Medals
Men's basketball
Representing the United States
FIBA Americas Championship
Gold medal – first place	1997 Montevideo	Team competition
Pan American Games
Silver medal – second place	1999 Winnipeg	Team competition

Travis Williams (born May 27, 1969) is an American former professional basketball player.

Born in Columbia, South Carolina, he attended South Carolina State University and signed with the Charlotte Hornets in 1997 where he played until 1999.

Williams played in the Continental Basketball Association (CBA) for the Fort Wayne Fury, Oklahoma City Cavalry, Florida Beachdogs and Rockford Lightning from 1991 to 1997. He was selected to the All-CBA First Team in 1997.

From 2000 to 2001, he played with Vertical Vision Cantu of the Italian league.
