= Rory White =

American basketball player and coach (born 1959)

Personal information
- Born: August 16, 1959 (age 67) Tuskegee, Alabama, U.S.
- Listed height: 6 ft 8 in (2.03 m)
- Listed weight: 210 lb (95 kg)

Career information
- High school: Tuskegee (Tuskegee, Alabama)
- College: South Alabama (1977–1982)
- NBA draft: 1982: 4th round, 86th overall pick
- Drafted by: Phoenix Suns
- Playing career: 1982–1994
- Position: Power forward
- Number: 7, 10, 12, 22, 44

Career history

Playing
- 1982–1983: Phoenix Suns
- 1983–1984: Wyoming Wildcatters
- 1984: Milwaukee Bucks
- 1984: Albuquerque Silvers
- 1984–1987: San Diego / Los Angeles Clippers
- 1987–1988: Collado Villalba
- 1989: Caripe Pescara
- 1989: Maristas
- 1989–1990: Santa Barbara Islanders
- 1990–1991: Oostende
- 1991: Rapid City Thrillers
- 1991–1992: Ferro Carril Oeste
- 1992: Oklahoma City Cavalry
- 1992–1994: Fargo-Moorhead Fever

Coaching
- 1995–1997: Fargo-Moorhead Beez
- 1997: Florida Sharks
- 1997–1998: Fargo-Moorhead Beez
- 1999–2001: Idaho Stampede
- 2001: Marinos de Oriente
- 2001–2002: Fargo-Moorhead Beez
- 2002–2003: Idaho Stampede
- 2009–2011: Dakota Wizards

Career highlights
- Sun Belt Player of the Year (1979); 3× First-team All-Sun Belt (1979, 1981, 1982); No. 44 retired by South Alabama Jaguars
- Stats at NBA.com
- Stats at Basketball Reference

Rory Wilbur White (born August 16, 1959) is an American former professional basketball player. A 6-foot-8-inch (2.03 m) and 210 pounds (95 kg) power forward, he played college basketball for the South Alabama Jaguars, and was the Sun Belt Conference Player of the Year in 1979. He was selected with the 17th pick of the fourth round of the 1982 NBA draft by the Phoenix Suns. He averaged 11.7 points and 0.99 steals per game with the Los Angeles Clippers in 1985–86, arguably his best season.

== College career ==
White played college basketball at the University of South Alabama from 1977 to 1982. At South Alabama, he won numerous awards, including the Sun Belt Conference player of the year award in 1979. Additionally, White was named to the All-Conference team three times and was named to the 1982 Sun Belt All-Tournament team.

In 1979, White helped South Alabama to the Sun Belt regular season title and a trip to the 1979 NCAA tournament, where the Jaguars lost in the first round to Louisville University.

White would suffer a serious knee injury in 1980, causing him to miss nearly the entire 1979–80 season, playing in only two games.

== Professional career ==
After his career at South Alabama, White became just the second player from South Alabama at the time to be drafted into the NBA (after Ed Rains in 1981).

White spent five seasons in the NBA playing for various teams, including the Phoenix Suns, Milwaukee Bucks, and San Diego/Los Angeles Clippers.

After his NBA career ended in 1987, White played in the CBA (with Santa Barbara, Rapid City, Oklahoma City and Fargo-Moorhead) and overseas (Argentina, Belgium, Israel, Italy and Spain).

== Career statistics ==
Legend
GP	Games played	GS	Games started	MPG	Minutes per game
FG%	Field goal percentage	3P%	3-point field goal percentage	FT%	Free throw percentage
RPG	Rebounds per game	APG	Assists per game	SPG	Steals per game
BPG	Blocks per game	PPG	Points per game	**Bold**	Career high

=== NBA ===
==== Regular season ====
Year	Team	GP	GS	MPG	FG%	3P%	FT%	RPG	APG	SPG	BPG	PPG
1982–83	Phoenix	65	0	9.6	**.543**	.000	.642	1.6	0.5	0.2	0.0	5.0
1983–84	Phoenix	22	2	14.0	.479	.000	.571	2.8	0.6	0.6	0.1	7.4
1983–84	Milwaukee	8	0	5.6	.412	.000	.400	1.0	0.1	0.3	0.1	2.0
1983–84	San Diego	6	0	3.2	.444	.000	.000	0.7	0.0	0.0	0.0	1.3
1984–85	Los Angeles	**80**	14	13.8	.516	.000	.692	2.4	0.4	0.4	**0.3**	4.7
1985–86	Los Angeles	75	30	**23.5**	.519	**.111**	**.739**	2.4	1.0	**1.0**	0.1	**11.7**
1986–87	Los Angeles	68	**35**	22.7	.480	.000	.653	**2.9**	**1.2**	0.7	**0.3**	9.2
Career		324	81	16.7	.506	.077	.681	2.3	0.7	0.6	0.2	7.4

==== Playoffs ====
Year	Team	GP	GS	MPG	FG%	3P%	FT%	RPG	APG	SPG	BPG	PPG
1982–83	Phoenix	**3**	–	**13.3**	**.500**	.000	**.500**	**3.3**	0.0	0.0	0.0	**5.3**
Career		3	–	13.3	.500	.000	.500	3.3	0.0	0.0	0.0	5.3

=== College ===
Year	Team	GP	GS	MPG	FG%	3P%	FT%	RPG	APG	SPG	BPG	PPG
1977–78	South Alabama	28	–	19.2	.539	–	.635	4.4	0.3	–	**0.5**	8.1
1978–79	South Alabama	27	–	31.7	.553	–	.670	**8.4**	–	–	–	**19.0**
1979–80	South Alabama	2	–	5.0	**.750**	–	.000	0.5	–	–	–	3.0
1980–81	South Alabama	**31**	–	33.3	.589	–	**.721**	6.6	0.5	–	–	16.4
1981–82	South Alabama	28	**24**	**33.5**	.562	–	.703	6.5	**1.0**	**0.8**	0.4	16.9
Career		116	24	29.1	.564	–	.686	6.4	0.4	0.2	0.2	14.9
