= Stanley Jackson (basketball) =

American basketball player (born 1970)

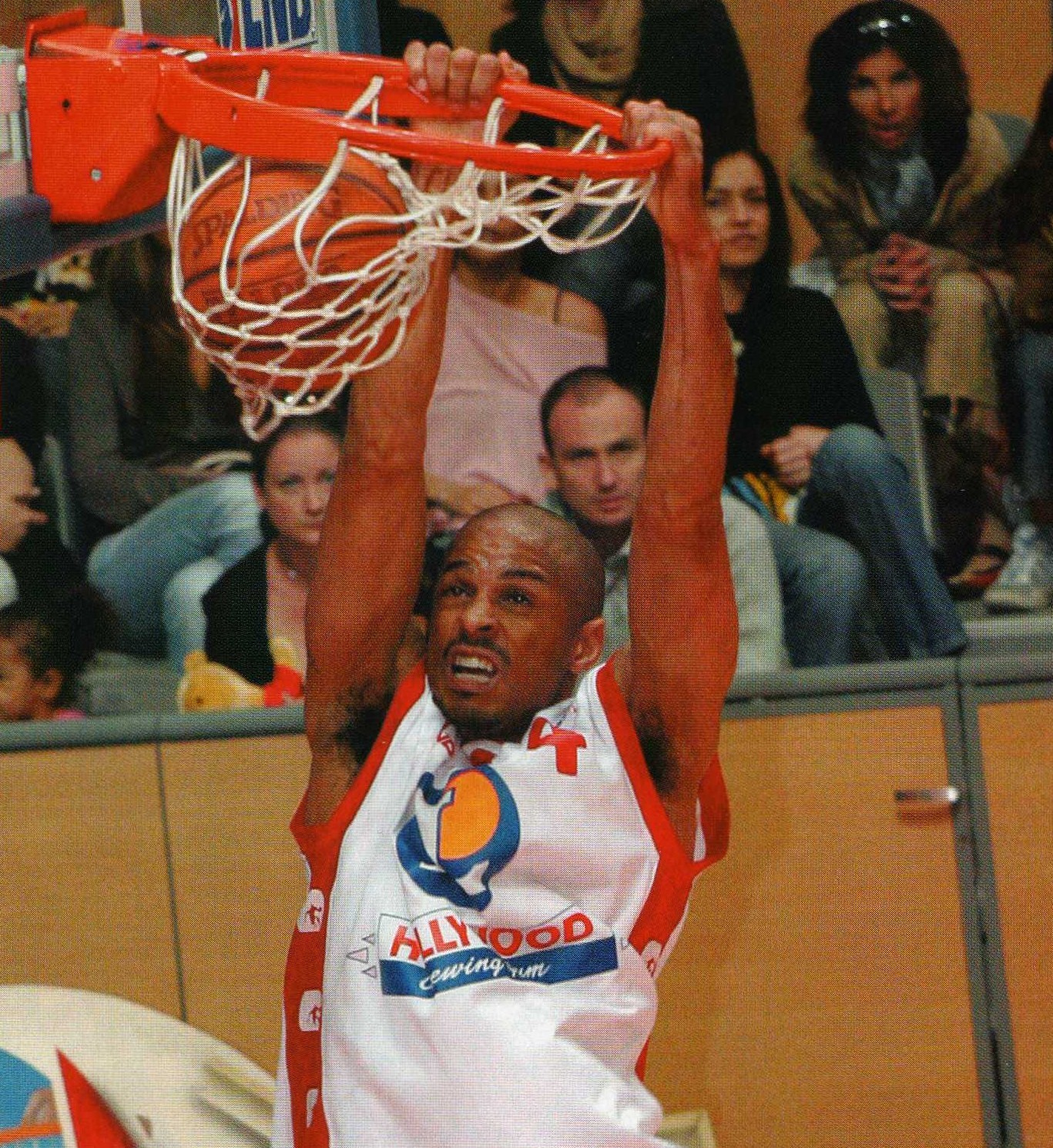
- Jackson dunks in a game with Élan Chalon

Personal information
- Born: October 10, 1970 (age 56) Tuskegee, Alabama
- Listed height: 6 ft 3 in (1.91 m)
- Listed weight: 185 lb (84 kg)

Career information
- High school: Valley (Valley, Alabama)
- College: UAB (1989–1993)
- NBA draft: 1993: undrafted
- Playing career: 1993–2006
- Position: Shooting guard
- Number: 7

Career history
- 1993–1994: Minnesota Timberwolves
- 1994–1995: AEK Larnaca
- 1995: Florida Sharks
- 1995–1996: Florida Beachdogs
- 1996–1997: CB Cáceres
- 1997–1998: Caja San Fernando
- 1998–1999: Quad City Thunder
- 1999–2000: JDA Dijon Basket
- 2000–2005: Élan Chalon
- 2005–2006: Strasbourg IG
- Stats at NBA.com
- Stats at Basketball Reference

Stanley Leon Jackson (born October 10, 1970) is an American former professional basketball player, at the shooting guard position. He played briefly in the National Basketball Association (NBA), as well as several other top leagues around the world.

Born in Tuskegee, Alabama, Jackson played collegiately at the University of Alabama-Birmingham, after attending the Valley High School in Valley, Alabama. Undrafted in 1993, he made the Minnesota Timberwolves' roster for the upcoming season, going on to appear in 17 regular season matches in his only National Basketball Association spell.

Subsequently, Jackson spent the next years overseas, playing in Cyprus, Spain and France (namely with ÉS Chalon-sur-Saône, where he stayed from 2000 to 2005), also having spells in the North American minor leagues.
