= Brian Martin (basketball) =

American basketball player (1962–2025)

Personal information
- Born: August 18, 1962 Fort Smith, Arkansas, U.S.
- Died: August 15, 2025 (aged 62) Wichita, Kansas, U.S.
- Listed height: 6 ft 9 in (2.06 m)
- Listed weight: 212 lb (96 kg)

Career information
- High school: Northwest (Wichita, Kansas)
- College: Hutchinson CC (1980–1981); Kansas (1981–1984)
- NBA draft: 1984: 9th round, 185th overall pick
- Drafted by: Indiana Pacers
- Playing career: 1984–1994
- Position: Power forward / small forward
- Number: 35, 21

Career history
- 1984–1985: Tampa Bay Thrillers
- 1985: Seattle SuperSonics
- 1986: Portland Trail Blazers
- 1988–1989: Rapid City Thrillers
- 1989: Cedar Rapids Silver Bullets
- 1989–1991: Columbus Horizon
- 1993–1994: Omaha Racers
- 1993–1994: Fort Wayne Fury

Career highlights
- CBA champion (1985); All-CBA Second Team (1986); CBA All-Defensive First Team (1986); CBA blocks leader (1986)
- Stats at NBA.com
- Stats at Basketball Reference

Brian Martin (August 18, 1962 – August 15, 2025) was an American professional basketball player, who had a brief career in the National Basketball Association (NBA). Born in Fort Smith, Arkansas, he attended Hutchinson Community College and the University of Kansas.

Martin, a 6 ft 9 in (2.06 m), 212 lb (96 kg) forward, was selected by the Indiana Pacers with the 185th overall pick in the 1984 NBA draft. His only NBA season (1985–86) was split with the Portland Trail Blazers and the Seattle SuperSonics.

He also had a lengthy career in the Continental Basketball Association (CBA). In 252 games over six seasons, he averaged 9.0 points and 8.7 rebounds per game. He played for the Tampa Bay/Rapid City Thrillers, Cedar Rapids Silver Bullets, Columbus Horizon, Omaha Racers, and Fort Wayne Fury, winning a league championship with Tampa Bay in 1985. His best year was the 1985–86 season, when he averaged 11.9 points and 11.6 rebounds per game for Tampa Bay, earning All-CBA Second Team and All-Defensive First Team honors.

Martin died on August 15, 2025, at the age of 62.

== Career statistics ==
Legend
GP	Games played	GS	Games started	MPG	Minutes per game
FG%	Field goal percentage	3P%	3-point field goal percentage	FT%	Free throw percentage
RPG	Rebounds per game	APG	Assists per game	SPG	Steals per game
BPG	Blocks per game	PPG	Points per game	**Bold**	Career high

=== NBA ===
==== Regular season ====
Year	Team	GP	GS	MPG	FG%	3P%	FT%	RPG	APG	SPG	BPG	PPG
1985–86	Seattle	3	0	2.3	**.500**	–	–	**1.3**	.0	.0	**.3**	.7
1985–86	Portland	**5**	0	**2.8**	.400	–	.000	.0	.0	.0	.0	**.8**
Career		8	0	2.6	.429	–	.000	.5	.0	.0	.1	.8
