= Fort Wayne Fury =

Professional basketball team in Fort Wayne, Indiana, US (1991–2001)

- Leagues: CBA
- Founded: 1991
- Folded: 2001
- History: Fort Wayne Fury (1991–2001)
- Arena: Allen County War Memorial Coliseum
- Capacity: 13,000
- Location: Fort Wayne, Indiana
- Team colors: red, black, teal

The Fort Wayne Fury was a professional basketball team in the Continental Basketball Association (CBA) from 1991 through the cessation of the CBA on February 8, 2001.

== History ==
The team played at the Allen County War Memorial Coliseum in Fort Wayne, Indiana. The Fury finished as the league's runner-up in the 1996 season. Former members of the team include former Indiana University standouts Damon Bailey, Jay Edwards, Michael Lewis, Eric Anderson and Greg Graham, NBA guard/forward Stephen Jackson, former multiple-time World Heavyweight Championship (professional wrestling) wrestler Kevin Nash, Mikki Moore, Lloyd Daniels and Percy Miller, better known as the rapper, "Master P". The original Fury coach was Gerald Oliver. NBA Hall of Famer Rick Barry also served as head coach of the team at one point. Another former coach was Keith Smart, who went on to coach the Cleveland Cavaliers of the NBA. Smart then went on to spend one season as the head coach of the Golden State Warriors of the NBA and was the head coach of the Sacramento Kings until June 2013, when he was replaced by Mike Malone as the new head coach.

== Head coaches ==
- Gerald Oliver
- Mo McHone
- Rick Barry
- Clifford Ray
- Bruce Stewart
- Sam Worthen
- Keith Smart

== Notable players ==
- Ashraf Amaya (born 1971), American former professional basketball player
- Eric Anderson (1970–2018), American NBA basketball player
- Roderick Anderson
- Damon Bailey
- Roosevelt Barnes
- Drew Barry
- Scooter Barry
- Emmanuel Bibb
- Alex Blackwell
- Etdrick Bohannon
- Bruce Bowen
- Marc Brown (born 1969), American basketball player and coach
- Myron Brown
- Torgeir Bryn
- Dante Calabria
- Michael Campbell (born 1975), American basketball player
- Jimmy Carruth
- Duane Cooper
- John Cooper (born 1969), head men's basketball coach at Miami University
- Pat Cummings
- William Cunningham (born 1974), American professional basketball player
- Lloyd Daniels
- Yinka Dare
- Danny Earl
- Jay Edwards
- Ron Ellis
- Jim Farmer
- Tony Farmer (born 1970), American basketball player
- Matt Fish
- Jelani Gardner
- Chris Garner (born 1975), American basketball player
- Marlon Garnett
- Tate George
- Derrick Gervin
- Omm'A Givens
- Greg Graham
- Evric Gray
- Thomas Hamilton (born 1975), American basketball player
- Darrin Hancock
- Jerome Harmon (born 1969), American basketball player
- Juaquin Hawkins
- Thomas Hill (born 1971), American basketball player
- Steve Hood
- Alfredrick Hughes
- Anderson Hunt
- Byron Irvin
- Mike Iuzzolino
- Jaren Jackson
- Randell Jackson
- Stephen Jackson
- Courtney James
- Mark Jones (born 1975), American NBA basketball player for the Orlando Magic
- Lari Ketner
- Greg Kite
- Frank Kornet
- Antonio Lang
- Priest Lauderdale
- Michael Lewis (basketball coach)
- Sam Mack
- Brian Martin (1962–2025), American basketball player
- Wes Matthews
- Amal McCaskill
- Michael McDonald
- Conrad McRae
- Master P (Percy Robert Miller, born 1970), American rapper, actor and businessman
- Mikki Moore
- Isaiah Morris
- Craig Neal
- Melvin Newbern
- Jeff Nordgaard
- Moochie Norris
- Anthony Pelle
- Mark Randall (born 1967), American basketball player
- Ken Redfield
- Jeff Sanders
- Brian Shorter
- Keith Smart
- Chris Smith (born 1970), American basketball player in the 1990s
- Clinton Smith
- Elmore Spencer
- Brook Steppe
- Mark Strickland
- Greg Sutton
- Larry Sykes
- Jay Taylor
- Álvaro Teherán
- Carl Thomas
- Charles Thomas (born 1969), American professional basketball player
- Irving Thomas
- Ray Tolbert
- Keith Tower
- Kelvin Upshaw
- Logan Vander Velden
- Fred Vinson
- Jameel Watkins
- Mitchell Wiggins
- Mike Williams (born 1963), American retired basketball player
- Travis Williams (born 1969), American basketball player
- Nikita Wilson

== See also ==
- History of sports in Fort Wayne, Indiana
- Fort Wayne General Electrics
- Fort Wayne Hoosiers
