= Jeff Webster =

American basketball player (born 1971)

Personal information
- Born: February 19, 1971 (age 55) Pine Bluff, Arkansas, U.S.
- Listed height: 6 ft 8 in (2.03 m)
- Listed weight: 232 lb (105 kg)

Career information
- High school: Carl Albert (Midwest City, Oklahoma)
- College: Oklahoma (1989–1994)
- NBA draft: 1994: 2nd round, 40th overall pick
- Drafted by: Miami Heat
- Position: Small forward
- Number: 42

Career history
- 1994–1995: Rapid City Thrillers
- 1995: Tri-City Chinook
- 1995: Sioux Falls Skyforce
- 1995: Washington Bullets

Career highlights
- First-team All-Big Eight (1994); Second-team Parade All-American (1989); McDonald's All-American (1989)
- Stats at NBA.com
- Stats at Basketball Reference
Medals
Men's basketball
Representing United States
Summer Universiade
Gold medal – first place	1993 Buffalo	National team

Jeffrey Tyrone Webster (born February 19, 1971) is an American former professional basketball player.

Webster played collegiately for the University of Oklahoma, where he scored 2,258 points and collected 781 rebounds.

Webster was selected 40th overall by the Miami Heat in the 1994 NBA draft, but he and fellow Heat draftee Ed Stokes were traded to the Washington Bullets in exchange for Rex Chapman and the draft rights to Terrence Rencher. He played 11 games with the Bullets during the 1995–96 season before his brief NBA career came to an end.

Webster also played in the Continental Basketball Association for the Rapid City Thrillers, Tri-City Chinook and the Sioux Falls Skyforce. His career averages were 3.9 points and 1.7 rebounds per game.

Webster’s daughter Jordan currently plays for the Texas A&M Aggies women's basketball team in her senior year.

Webster's son Justin currently plays for the UNLV Runnin Rebs basketball team.
