= Olimpia Basket Pistoia =

Italian professional basketball team

Olimpia Basket Pistoia, also known as Maltinti Pistoia after one of its historic sponsors, was an Italian professional basketball team from the town of Pistoia.

For a brief period, it was 50% owned by Kobe Bryant, for which his father had played.

It played in Serie A, the Italian top-level professional league, in the 1990s. Their best result was 8th place in the 1992/93 season. It participated in the Korać Cup in the 1996/97 season. After the 1998/99 season, when they were relegated from Serie A, the team went bankrupt and is currently defunct. Pistoia is currently represented in LegADue by another team, Carmatic Pistoia.

The team was established in 1965 and, due to sponsorship deals, was also known as Kleenex Pistoia (1988–94), Madigan Pistoia (1994-96), Rolly Pistoia (1996–97) and Mabo Pistoia (1997-99).

== Notable players ==
- (United States) Leon Douglas 4 seasons: '87-'91
- (United States) Joe Bryant 2 seasons: '87-'89
- (Italy) Andrea Daviddi 2 seasons: '87-'89
- (Italy) Claudio Crippa 10 seasons: '88-'98
- (United States) (Republic of Ireland) Ron Rowan 3 seasons: '89-'92
- (Italy) Luca Silvestrin 3 seasons: '89-'92
- (United States) Charles Jones 1 season: '90'-'91
- (United States) Dan Gay 3 seasons: '91-'93, '97-'98
- (Italy) Massimo Minto 5 seasons: '92-'93, '94-'98
- (Italy) Andrea Forti 3 seasons: '92-'95
- (United States) Joe Binion 2 seasons: '92-'94
- (Italy) Francesco Vescovi 2 seasons: '93-'94, '97-'98
- (United States) Tod Murphy 1 season: '93-'94
- (United States) Adrian Caldwell 1 season: '93-'94
- (United States) Stephen Howard 1 season: '94-'95
- (United States) Marty Embry 1 season: '94-'95
- (United States) Irving Thomas 2 seasons: '95-'97
- (Italy) Davide Ancilotto 1 season: '95-'96
- (United States) Ken Barlow 1 season: '95-'96
- (United States) Junior Burrough 1 season: '96
- (United States) (Germany) Derrick Taylor 1 season: '96-'97
- (United States) Thomas Burrough 1 season: '96-'97
- (Italy) Matteo Soragna 1 season: '96-'97
- (Italy) Vincenzo Esposito 1 season: '97-'98
- (The Bahamas) Ian Lockhart 1 season: '97-'98
- (United States) Ed Stokes 1 season: '97-'98
- (United States) James Forrest 1 season: '98-'99
- (United States) (Italy) Travis Mays 1 season: '98-'99
- (United States) John Turner 1 season: '98-'99
