= Scaligera Basket Verona =

Tezenis Verona
- Leagues: LBA
- Founded: 1951
- History: Scaligera Basket (1951–2002); Scaligera Basket Verona (2007–present)
- Arena: Pala MAGIS
- Capacity: 5,350
- Location: Verona, Veneto, Italy
- Team colors: Yellow and Blue
- President: Gianluigi Pedrollo
- Head coach: Alessandro Ramagli
- Team captain: Federico Zampini
- Championships: 1 Korać Cup; 1 Italian Cup; 1 Italian SuperCup; 1 Italian LNP Cup; 2 Serie A2
- Retired numbers: 2 (8, 9)
- Website: scaligerabasket.it
Home	Away

Scaligera Basket Verona, known for sponsorship reasons as Tezenis Verona, is an Italian professional basketball club based in Verona, Italy. They compete in the Lega Basket Serie A (LBA), the top tier of Italian basketball.

== History ==
=== 1951–1982: Decades within the minor leagues ===
Scaligera Basket was founded in Verona in 1951. From 1951 until 1971, Scaligera took part in local and regional competitions within the minor leagues of Italian basketball. In the early 1970s, a local entrepreneur, Giuseppe Vicenzi became the new owner of the club and sponsored the team Vicenzi Biscotti, which became one of the most recognizable names for Scaligera. In the 1976–77 season, Scaligera reached the Serie B. Despite a relegation to Serie C in the following season, the club was able to re-gain the promotion in 1977–78. In the 1982–83 season, under the leadership of coach Bruno Arrigoni, Verona was promoted to Serie A2, the second division of Italian basketball.

=== 1982–1991: Years in Serie A2 and the Italian Cup ===
In the first year of Serie A2, Scaligera had to play in Padua due to the lack of a sports hall in Verona and was relegated to Serie B. However, the team re-gained the Serie A2 in 1986 by returning to Verona. The team was sponsored by Citrosil, a product of Glaxo, a pharmaceutical company whose Italian headquarters was located in Verona and which, thanks to the determination of its president Mario Fertonani, decided to support the Vicenzi family. The 1987 relegation was immediately followed by the promotion to Serie A2 in 1988, when the team was directly sponsored by Glaxo. In 1989, Alberto Bucci became the new head coach of the team, however, Scaligera failed in reaching the promotion in the 1989–90 season.

The years in Serie A2 ended with the 1990–91 championship which was characterized by their first promotion to Serie A1 and, above all, with the victory of the Italian Basketball Cup, Scaligera's first trophy. On 21 February 1991, Scaligera won the Cup for 97–85 against Philips Milano. This success went down in the annals of Italian basketball, as it was the first and so far the only national cup won by a team from the second league. The important players of that season were Russ Schoene, Tim Kempton, Sandro Brusamarello, Giampiero Savio, Riccardo Morandotti and Paolo Moretti, as well as, the young Italian power forward Alessandro Frosini.

=== 1991–2002: At the top of Italian basketball ===
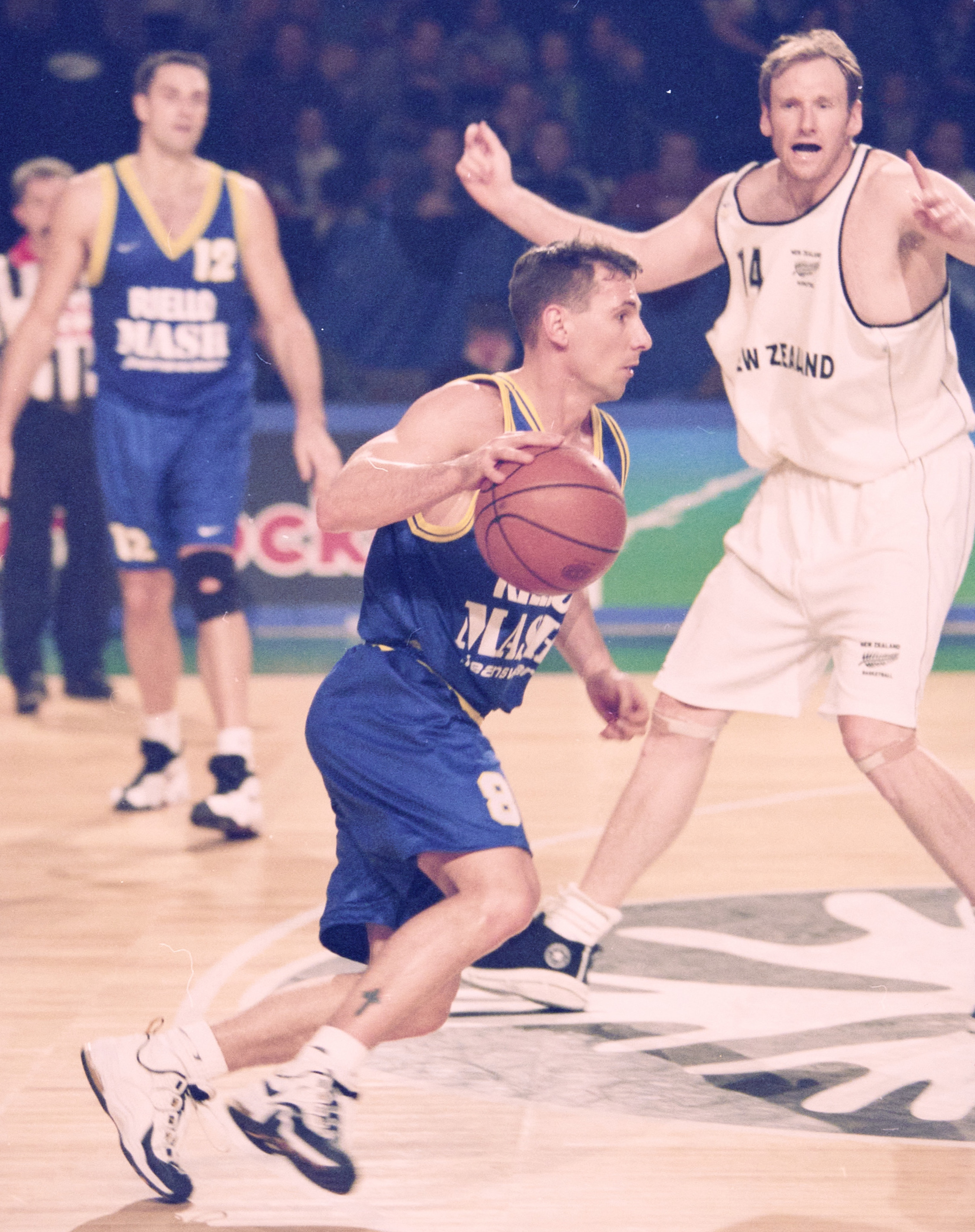
Mike Iuzzolino leading Verona against New Zealand during 1998 Haarlem Basketball Week

During the summer, coach Bucci left the club, being hired by Scavolini Pesaro, but Scaligera failed in finding a valuable substitute to coach Bucci and the 1991–92 championship ended with a relegation to Serie A2. However, under coach Franco Marcelletti the club was immediately promoted in the following season, thanks to important players like Alessandro Frosini, Davide Bonora, Henry Williams, Sylvester Gray and Giacomo Galanda. In 1993–94, the team arrived fourth in the regular season and, after having ousted 2–0 Olimpia Milano in the quarterfinals, Verona was eliminated by Virtus Bologna in the semi-finals by 2–1; the team also reached the Italian Cup final, which lost against Benetton Treviso. In 1995, the club signed the American pointguard Mike Iuzzolino. In the 1995–96, Marcelletti's team, was able to reach the Italian Cup final once again; however, it lost against Milano.

== Current roster ==
Note: Flags indicate national team eligibility at FIBA-sanctioned events. Players may hold other non-FIBA nationalities not displayed.

Tezenis Verona roster
Players
Coaches

Pos.	No.	Nat.	Name	Ht.	Wt.
G	0	(Italy)	Oliveri, Matteo	1.91 m (6 ft 3 in)		19 – 17 May 2007
SF	00	(United States)	Samuels Jr., Jermaine	1.98 m (6 ft 6 in)		27 – 13 November 1998
F/C	3	(Italy)	Poser, Federico	2.03 m (6 ft 8 in)		27 – 17 August 1999
SG	5	(United States)	Massinburg, CJ	1.96 m (6 ft 5 in)		29 – 4 April 1997
C	10	(Slovenia) (United States)	Tobey, Mike	2.13 m (7 ft 0 in)		32 – 10 October 1994
SF	11	(Italy)	Loro, Andrea	2.02 m (6 ft 8 in)		23 – 30 June 2003
PG	12	(United States)	Andrews, Andrew	1.88 m (6 ft 2 in)		33 – 25 May 1993
G	14	(Italy)	Ambrosin, Lorenzo	1.95 m (6 ft 5 in)		29 – 7 October 1997
C	15	(Senegal)	Mane, Maodo	2.11 m (6 ft 11 in)		18 – 31 December 2007
PG	18	(Italy)	Zampini, Federico (C)	1.91 m (6 ft 3 in)		27 – 27 June 1999
SF	21	(United States)	Brockington, Izaiah	1.95 m (6 ft 5 in)		27 – 12 July 1999
SF	22	(Puerto Rico)	Meléndez, RJ	2.00 m (6 ft 7 in)		23 – 3 December 2002
G	50	(France)	Barbitch, Milan	1.96 m (6 ft 5 in)		25 – 12 October 2001

Head coach

- (Italy) Alessandro Ramagli

Assistant coach(es)

- (Italy) Stefano Corengia
- (Italy) Stefano Bianchi

Legend

- (C) Team captain
- Injured

- Roster
Updated: October 30, 2026

== Honours and achievements ==
Total titles: (5)

=== Domestic competitions ===
- Italian Cup

Winners (1): 1990–91

- Italian Supercup

Winners (1): 1996

=== European competitions ===
- FIBA Korać Cup

Winners (1): 1997–98

== Notable players ==
Note: Flags indicate national team eligibility at FIBA-sanctioned events. Players may hold other non-FIBA nationalities not displayed.

Criteria

To appear in this section a player must have either:

- Set a club record or won an individual award while at the club
- Played at least one official international match for their national team at any time
- Played at least one official NBA match at any time.

- (Italy) Davide Bonora
- (Italy) Giuseppe Brumatti
- (Italy) Roberto Bullara
- (Italy) Riccardo Caneva
- (Italy) Claudio Capone
- (Italy) Vittorio Gallinari
- (Italy) Lino Lardo
- (Italy) Aniello Laezza
- (Italy) David Londero
- (Italy) Claudio Malagoli
- (Italy) Giacomo Galanda
- (Italy) Alessandro Frosini
- (Italy) Paolo Moretti
- (Italy) Rodolfo Rombaldoni
- (Albania) Klaudio Ndoja
- (Argentina) Antonio Porta
- (Canada) Leo Rautins
- (Germany) Hansi Gnad
- (Serbia) Miroslav Berić
- (Socialist Federal Republic of Yugoslavia) Dražen Dalipagić
- (United States) A.J. Abrams
- (United States) Corey Albano
- (United States) James Bailey
- (United States) Jay Bilas
- (United States) Louis Bullock
- (United States) Marty Conlon
- (United States) Corey Crowder
- (United States) Bill Edwards
- (United States) Bill Garnett
- (United States) Sylvester Gray
- (United States) Mike Iuzzolino
- (United States) Tim Kempton
- (United States) Randolph Keys
- (United States) Ryan Lorthridge
- (United States) Scott Meents
- (United States) Victor Page
- (United States) Casey Schmidt
- (United States) Russ Schoene
- (United States) Jeff Trepagnier
- (United States) Spud Webb
- (United States) Trevor Wilson
- (United States) Henry Williams
