= Kevin Salvadori =

American basketball player (born 1970)

Personal information
- Born: December 30, 1970 (age 55) Wheeling, West Virginia, U.S.
- Listed height: 7 ft 0 in (2.13 m)
- Listed weight: 231 lb (105 kg)

Career information
- High school: Seton-La Salle (Pittsburgh, Pennsylvania)
- College: North Carolina (1990–1994)
- NBA draft: 1994: undrafted
- Playing career: 1994–2000
- Position: Center
- Number: 32

Career history
- 1994–1995: Florida Sharks
- 1995–1996: Florida Beachdogs
- 1996–1998: Sacramento Kings
- 1998–1999: Rockford Lightning
- 2000: Spirou Charleroi

Career highlights
- NCAA champion (1993)
- Stats at NBA.com
- Stats at Basketball Reference

Kevin Michael Salvadori (born December 30, 1970) is an American former professional basketball player. A center, he played college basketball for the North Carolina Tar Heels, Salvadori went undrafted but did manage to play for the Sacramento Kings of the National Basketball Association (NBA) for two seasons from 1996 to 1998. He was listed at 7'0". He was an assistant basketball coach at Belmont Abbey College, a Division II program near Charlotte, North Carolina.

His father, Al Salvadori, was drafted by the Baltimore Bullets in the fourth round of the 1967 National Basketball Association (NBA) draft and was also selected by the Oakland Oaks of the American Basketball Association (ABA). Al Salvadori played one season for Oakland.

In his NBA career, Kevin Salvadori played in 39 games and scored a total of 42 points. He graduated from Seton-La Salle Catholic High School in Pittsburgh and was a member of North Carolina's 1993 National Championship team.
