= Nikita Wilson =

American basketball player (born 1964)

Personal information
- Born: February 25, 1964 (age 62) Pineville, Louisiana, U.S.
- Listed height: 6 ft 8 in (2.03 m)
- Listed weight: 200 lb (91 kg)

Career information
- High school: Leesville (Leesville, Louisiana)
- College: LSU (1983–1987)
- NBA draft: 1987: 2nd round, 30th overall pick
- Drafted by: Portland Trail Blazers
- Playing career: 1987–1996
- Position: Power forward
- Number: 41

Career history
- 1987: Portland Trail Blazers
- 1988: Tau Cerámica
- 1990–1991: Rapid City Thrillers
- 1992–1993: Rochester Renegade
- 1993: Grand Rapids Hoops
- 1993: Hartford Hellcats
- 1993–1994: Rockford Lightning
- 1994–1996: Fort Wayne Fury

Career highlights
- Second-team All-SEC (1985); Fourth-team Parade All-American (1983)
- Stats at NBA.com
- Stats at Basketball Reference

Nikita Franciscus Wilson (born February 25, 1964) is an American former professional basketball player. He was selected by the National Basketball Association's Portland Trail Blazers with the 30th overall pick in the second round of the 1987 NBA draft.

Wilson, whose nickname is "Bun," played at Leesville High School in Louisiana and was a member of the 1983 Parade All-American Fourth Team. He then played college basketball from 1983 to 1987 at Louisiana State University. After his college career ended, Wilson played 15 games for the Trail Blazers during the 1987-88 NBA season, averaging 1.3 points, and afterward played overseas, particularly in France.

== Career statistics ==
Legend
GP	Games played	GS	Games started	MPG	Minutes per game
FG%	Field goal percentage	3P%	3-point field goal percentage	FT%	Free throw percentage
RPG	Rebounds per game	APG	Assists per game	SPG	Steals per game
BPG	Blocks per game	PPG	Points per game	**Bold**	Career high

=== NBA ===
==== Regular season ====
Year	Team	GP	GS	MPG	FG%	3P%	FT%	RPG	APG	SPG	BPG	PPG
1987–88	Portland	15	0	3.6	.304	–	.833	.7	.2	.0	.0	1.3
