= Wes Matthews =

American basketball player (born 1959)

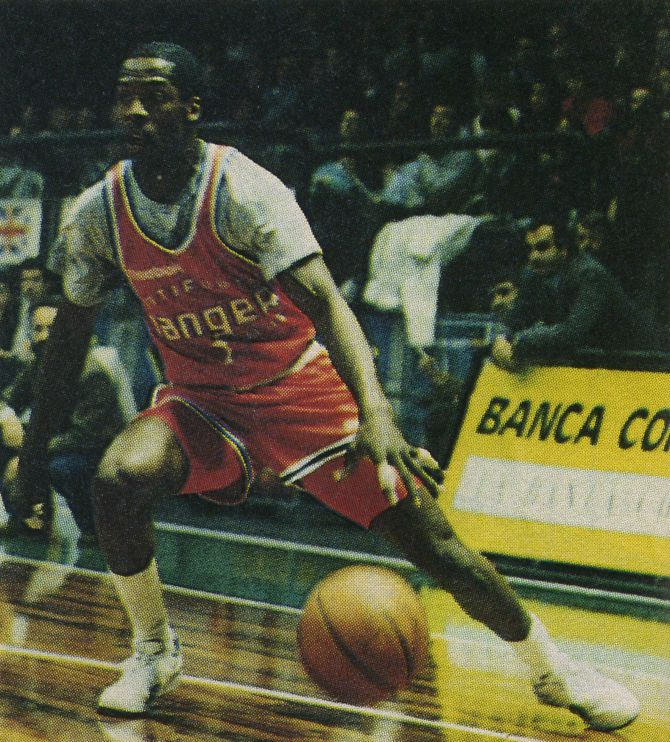
- Matthews with Ranger Varese in 1989

Personal information
- Born: August 24, 1959 (age 67) Sarasota, Florida, U.S.
- Listed height: 6 ft 1 in (1.85 m)
- Listed weight: 170 lb (77 kg)

Career information
- High school: Warren Harding (Bridgeport, Connecticut)
- College: Wisconsin (1977–1980)
- NBA draft: 1980: 1st round, 14th overall pick
- Drafted by: Washington Bullets
- Playing career: 1980–1996
- Position: Point guard
- Number: 1, 14

Career history
- 1980–1981: Washington Bullets
- 1981–1983: Atlanta Hawks
- 1983–1984: Ohio Mixers
- 1984: Atlanta Hawks
- 1984: Philadelphia 76ers
- 1984–1985: Chicago Bulls
- 1985–1986: San Antonio Spurs
- 1986–1988: Los Angeles Lakers
- 1988–1989: Tulsa Fast Breakers
- 1989: Ranger Varese
- 1990: Atlanta Hawks
- 1991: Atlanta Eagles
- 1991: Ginebra San Miguel
- 1992–1993: Rapid City Thrillers
- 1993–1994: Rochester Renegade
- 1994–1995: Fort Wayne Fury
- 1995: Florida Sharks
- 1995: Atlanta Trojans
- 1995: Memphis Fire
- 1996: Atlanta Trojans
- 1998: COC-Ribeirão Preto

Career highlights
- 2× NBA champion (1987, 1988); CBA champion (1989); PBA Best Import of the Conference award (1991 Third Conference); Fourth-team Parade All-American (1977)

Career NBA statistics
- Points: 3,654 (7.9 ppg)
- Rebounds: 626 (1.3 rpg)
- Assists: 1,955 (4.2 apg)
- Stats at NBA.com
- Stats at Basketball Reference

Wesley Joel Matthews Sr. (born August 24, 1959) is an American former professional basketball player who played in the National Basketball Association (NBA). He won two NBA championships with the Los Angeles Lakers. He is the father of former NBA player Wesley Matthews.

== Basketball career ==
Matthews graduated from Warren Harding High School in Bridgeport, Connecticut, in 1977. A 6 ft 1 in (1.85 m) point guard at the University of Wisconsin–Madison, he was selected by the Washington Bullets with the 14th pick of the 1980 NBA draft. He played nine seasons in the league with the Bullets, Atlanta Hawks (two stints), Philadelphia 76ers, Chicago Bulls, San Antonio Spurs and Los Angeles Lakers. Averaging eight points and four assists per game, he scored 3,654 career points and earned NBA Championship rings with the 1987 and 1988 Lakers.

Matthews retired from professional basketball in 1996. Besides his NBA stints, he also played in the United States Basketball League, in the Continental Basketball Association and in Italy, spending the 1989–90 season at Ranger Varese before being called by the Hawks for one regular season match.

He had a stint in the Philippine Basketball Association (PBA), winning the best import award in 1991 for Ginebra San Miguel.

== Career statistics ==
Legend
GP	Games played	GS	Games started	MPG	Minutes per game
FG%	Field goal percentage	3P%	3-point field goal percentage	FT%	Free throw percentage
RPG	Rebounds per game	APG	Assists per game	SPG	Steals per game
BPG	Blocks per game	PPG	Points per game	**Bold**	Career high
†	Won an NBA championship

=== NBA ===
==== Regular season ====
Year	Team	GP	GS	MPG	FG%	3P%	FT%	RPG	APG	SPG	BPG	PPG
1980–81	Washington	45	—	25.8	.499	.333	.767	1.5	4.4	1.0	0.2	12.3
1980–81	Atlanta	34	—	**32.5**	.488	.000	.837	**2.1**	6.2	**1.8**	0.2	**12.5**
1981–82	Atlanta	47	5	17.8	.440	.250	.759	1.2	3.0	1.1	0.0	6.9
1982–83	Atlanta	64	0	18.5	.403	.292	.768	1.4	3.9	0.9	0.1	6.9
1983–84	Atlanta	6	0	16.0	**.533**	.000	.818	0.7	3.5	0.8	0.2	8.3
1983–84	Philadelphia	14	5	20.9	.446	.143	.643	1.6	4.4	0.8	0.1	7.1
1984–85	Chicago	**78**	38	19.5	.495	.125	.694	0.9	4.5	0.9	0.2	5.7
1985–86	San Antonio	75	**46**	24.7	.531	.160	.820	1.7	**6.3**	1.2	**0.4**	10.9
1986–87†	L.A. Lakers	50	0	10.6	.476	**.333**	.806	0.9	2.0	0.5	0.1	4.2
1987–88†	L.A. Lakers	51	8	13.8	.460	.233	.831	1.3	2.7	0.5	0.1	5.7
1989–90	Atlanta	1	0	13.0	.333	.000	**1.000**	0.0	5.0	0.0	0.0	4.0
Career		465	102	20.0	.478	.225	.788	1.3	4.2	1.0	0.2	7.9

=== Playoffs ===
Year	Team	GP	GS	MPG	FG%	3P%	FT%	RPG	APG	SPG	BPG	PPG
1982	Atlanta	4	—	14.0	.200	—	**1.000**	0.0	2.0	0.0	**0.5**	4.0
1983	Atlanta	3	—	12.7	.333	.000	.800	0.0	3.7	0.0	0.3	3.3
1984	Philadelphia	4	—	5.8	.500	**.500**	.500	0.0	1.0	0.3	0.0	2.5
1985	Chicago	4	**4**	22.8	.344	.000	.778	1.5	3.0	1.3	0.0	7.3
1986	San Antonio	3	3	**38.7**	**.648**	.000	.750	**2.3**	**8.0**	**2.0**	0.0	**25.3**
1987†	L.A. Lakers	**12**	0	5.1	.478	.000	.857	0.3	0.8	0.1	0.0	2.3
1988†	L.A. Lakers	10	0	2.7	.400	.000	.800	0.1	0.2	0.1	0.0	1.2
Career		38	7	10.1	.482	.111	.800	0.5	1.7	0.4	0.1	4.6

== Personal life ==
Matthews' son, Wesley, also a basketball guard, played for Marquette University, and has played in the NBA since going undrafted in 2009.
