= Al Salvadori =

American basketball player (born 1945)

Personal information
- Born: May 6, 1945 (age 81) Wheeling, West Virginia, U.S.
- Listed height: 6 ft 9 in (2.06 m)
- Listed weight: 220 lb (100 kg)

Career information
- High school: Wheeling Central Catholic (Wheeling, West Virginia)
- College: South Carolina (1964–1967)
- NBA draft: 1967: 4th round, 32nd overall pick
- Drafted by: Baltimore Bullets
- Position: Forward
- Number: 15

Career history
- 1967: Oakland Oaks
- Stats at Basketball Reference

Albert Julian Salvadori (born May 6, 1945) is an American former professional basketball player. He was selected in the 1967 NBA draft but instead played in the American Basketball Association. Salvadori played for the Oakland Oaks during the 1967–68 ABA season and scored 54 points. He is also the father of Kevin Salvadori, who had a brief stint in the NBA in the mid-1990s.
