= Terrence Rencher =

American basketball player and coach (born 1973)

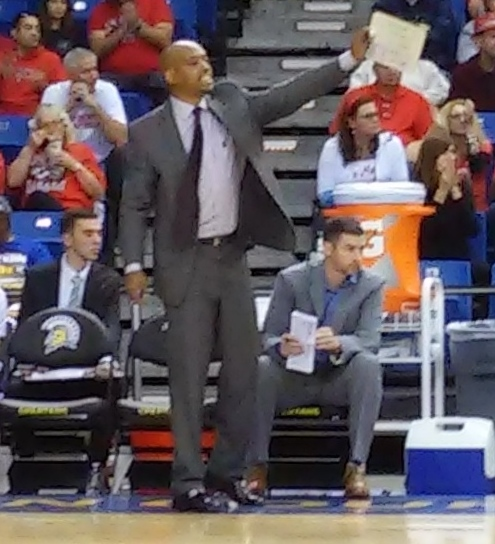
- Rencher in 2016 at the Event Center Arena

Texas A&M–Corpus Christi Islanders
- Title: Assistant coach
- League: Southland Conference

Personal information
- Born: February 19, 1973 (age 53) The Bronx, New York, U.S.
- Listed height: 6 ft 3 in (1.91 m)
- Listed weight: 185 lb (84 kg)

Career information
- High school: St. Raymond (The Bronx, New York)
- College: Texas (1991–1995)
- NBA draft: 1995: 2nd round, 32nd overall pick
- Drafted by: Washington Bullets
- Playing career: 1995–2007
- Position: Point guard
- Number: 15, 14
- Coaching career: 2007–present

Career history

Playing
- 1995–1996: Miami Heat
- 1996: Phoenix Suns
- 1996–1997: Grand Rapids Hoops
- 1997: Florida Beach Dogs
- 1997-1998: Bnei Herzliya
- 1999–2000: Canturina Cantù
- 2000–2001: KK Split
- 2001–2003: Telekom Baskets Bonn
- 2003–2004: Köln 99ers
- 2004: Eurofiditalia Reggio Calabria
- 2004–2005: Conad Rimini
- 2005–2006: Bnei HaSharon
- 2006–2007: Apollon Patras

Coaching
- 2007–2008: Regents HS
- 2008–2009: Saint Louis (GA)
- 2009–2011: Texas State (assistant)
- 2011–2012: Tulsa (assistant)
- 2012–2013: Sam Houston State (assistant)
- 2013–2015: Texas State (assistant)
- 2015–2017: New Mexico (assistant)
- 2017–2019: San Diego (assistant)
- 2019–2021: Creighton (assistant)
- 2021–2024: Oklahoma State (assistant)
- 2024–present: Texas A&M–Corpus Christi (assistant)

Career highlights
- 2× First-team All-SWC (1992, 1995); SWC Freshman of the Year (1992); Mr. New York Basketball (1991)

Career statistics
- Points: 106 (2.9 ppg)
- Rebounds: 44 (1.2 rpg)
- Assists: 54 (1.5 apg)
- Stats at NBA.com
- Stats at Basketball Reference

Terrence Lamont Rencher (born February 19, 1973) is an American former professional basketball player. He is an assistant coach for the Texas A&M–Corpus Christi Islanders.

== Playing career ==
Rencher was a prep star at St. Raymond High School for Boys in the Bronx, New York, earning New York City MVP honors in his senior year. Rencher attended the University of Texas at Austin, being drawn to the high-paced tempo of play that coach Tom Penders employed. There he finished his career with 2,306 points (making him both the school's and Southwest Conference's all-time career scorer in men's basketball) and 440 assists.

The Washington Bullets selected Rencher in the 1995 NBA draft, but his draft rights were traded along with Rex Chapman to the Miami Heat for the draft rights to Jeff Webster and Ed Stokes. He was traded midway through his rookie season (1995–96) with the Heat to the Phoenix Suns, in exchange for Tony Smith. Internationally, he played for Bnei Herzliya in Israel, Pallacanestro Cantù, Basket Rimini and Viola Reggio Calabria in Italy, KK Split in Croatia and Telekom Baskets Bonn and RheinEnergie Köln in Germany, amongst others.

== Post-playing career ==
Rencher moved back to the United States in 2006 and enrolled at UT for the 2007 spring semester. In addition to taking three semesters of classes and serving as a student mentor, Rencher also served as the basketball program director at the Regents School of Austin and coach of the boys' varsity team.

His college coaching career began as a graduate assistant at Saint Louis University under the late Rick Majerus during the 2008–09 season. In 2009–11 he worked as an assistant coach at Texas State University under Doug Davalos. In 2011–12 he worked as an assistant coach at the University of Tulsa under Doug Wojcik. In 2012–13 he worked as an assistant coach at Sam Houston State University under Jason Hooten. In 2013–15 he worked as an assistant coach at Texas State University under Danny Kaspar. In 2015-17 he worked as an assistant coach at University of New Mexico under Craig Neal. In 2017-19 he worked as an assistant coach at University of San Diego under Sam Scholl. In 2019-2021 he worked as an assistant coach at Creighton University under Greg McDermott. From 2021–present he works at Oklahoma State University under Mike Boynton.

He was hired as an assistant coach at University of New Mexico in July 2015 to work under head coach Craig Neal. After two winning seasons, he accepted a new position as an assistant coach at University of San Diego in 2017. In his first year at University of San Diego, Rencher assisted the team in earning a 20-win 2017–2018 season, inclusive of a quarterfinals appearance in the CollegeInsider.com (CIT) Post-Season Tournament. In his second year, Rencher assisted first-time head coach Sam Scholl in improving the team to a 21-win 2018–2019 season, which included a semi-finals finish in the West Coast ConferenceTournament, as well as a National Invitational Tournament (NIT) appearance, the program's first in school history.

As of 2019, Terrence Rencher has served as an assistant coach at Creighton University to head coach Greg McDermott. During this time, the Blue Jays clinched the Big East Men's Basketball Conference Regular Season Championship and McDermott achieved Big East Conference Men's Basketball Coach of the Year for the 2019–2020 season, and were set to appear in both the 2020 Big East men's basketball tournament, as well as the 2020 NCAA Division I men's basketball tournament prior to cancellation of those events. Most recently, the Creighton Blue Jays earned a spot in the Sweet 16 of the 2021 NCAA Division I men's basketball tournament for the first time in recent school history.
