= Rex Chapman =

American basketball player (born 1967)

Personal information
- Born: October 5, 1967 (age 59) Bowling Green, Kentucky, U.S.
- Listed height: 6 ft 4 in (1.93 m)
- Listed weight: 185 lb (84 kg)

Career information
- High school: Apollo (Owensboro, Kentucky)
- College: Kentucky (1986–1988)
- NBA draft: 1988: 1st round, 8th overall pick
- Drafted by: Charlotte Hornets
- Playing career: 1988–2000
- Position: Shooting guard / point guard
- Number: 3, 7

Career history
- 1988–1992: Charlotte Hornets
- 1992–1995: Washington Bullets
- 1995–1996: Miami Heat
- 1996–2000: Phoenix Suns

Career highlights
- NBA All-Rookie Second Team (1989); Third-team All-American – NABC (1988); First-team All-SEC (1988); Second-team All-SEC (1987); SEC tournament MVP (1988); McDonald's All-American (1986); First-team Parade All-American (1986); Kentucky Mr. Basketball (1986)

Career NBA statistics
- Points: 9,731 (14.6 ppg)
- Rebounds: 1,645 (2.5 rpg)
- Assists: 1,798 (2.7 apg)
- Stats at NBA.com
- Stats at Basketball Reference
Medals
Men's basketball
Representing United States
Pan American Games
Silver medal – second place	1987 Indianapolis	Team competition

Rex Everett Chapman (born October 5, 1967) is an American former professional basketball player and social media influencer, mostly known for his time with the Charlotte Hornets from 1988 to 1992 and for his time with the Phoenix Suns from 1996 to 2000. Chapman was a high school star in Kentucky, winning many awards for his play. In two seasons at the University of Kentucky, he won further awards and scored more than 1,000 points. Chapman was the first draft pick of the expansion Charlotte Hornets and played on four National Basketball Association (NBA) teams. Over his 12-year career, he averaged 14.6 points per game and appeared in two slam dunk competitions.

Injuries sustained on NBA courts led Chapman to an addiction to opioids. Following an arrest for shoplifting, he entered drug rehab for the third time and was able to overcome his addiction. After retiring, Chapman held several jobs with NBA teams, culminating in being the vice president of player personnel with the Denver Nuggets. He is a broadcaster for University of Kentucky basketball games.

== Early life and education ==
Rex Chapman was born October 5, 1967, in Bowling Green, Kentucky. Rex's father is Wayne Chapman, who played in the American Basketball Association and coached Kentucky Wesleyan College to two NCAA Division II national championships. Chapman had a turbulent relationship with his father; he and his sister, Jenny, "used to pray that Wayne's teams would win" so the mood of the house would not be tense, while his mother, Laura, would attempt to defuse the tension.

== Amateur career ==
Chapman was a high school basketball star at Apollo High School in Owensboro, Kentucky. During his junior year, Chapman led his team to the state quarterfinals. He racked up numerous awards and accolades his senior year, including Mr. Basketball of Kentucky, Gatorade State Player of the Year, Associated Press Player of the Year, and McDonalds's All-American. In 2020, radio host Matt Jones described Chapman as, "the biggest high school basketball player that ever came from the state." He was inducted into the Kentucky High School Basketball Hall of Fame in 2012. Chapman was heavily recruited by many universities, but he chose to stay close to home when he signed with the University of Kentucky.

Chapman was a star with the Kentucky Wildcats. His freshman year, he averaged 16 points a game, was named Southeastern Conference (SEC) Freshman of the Year, set a record for points by a freshman, and led the Wildcats to the 1987 NCAA tournament. Chapman improved his sophomore year average to 19 points a game. Chapman, joined by teammates such as future NBA journeyman Winston Bennett, helped lead Kentucky to the SEC title (Note: The SEC title was later vacated.) with a 27–6 record. The Wildcats were ranked as the sixth college basketball team in the nation by the AP and UPI and secured the No. 2 seed in the South region of the 1988 NCAA tournament. Kentucky reached the Sweet Sixteen, where Chapman scored a career best 30 points in a losing effort against Villanova. Chapman was named to the All-SEC Team both of his college years and amassed a total of 1,073 points before opting to enter the NBA draft. Chapman left the university as a "campus legend" with the nickname "King Rex".

Chapman found the off-court scrutiny and attention difficult. He said he was harassed by other students and the coaching staff for continuing to date his black high school girlfriend. "It wore on me," said Chapman, who is white. "It was hateful."

== Professional career ==
=== Charlotte Hornets ===
The Charlotte Hornets of the National Basketball Association (NBA), an expansion team, selected Chapman with the eighth overall pick in the 1988 NBA draft; he became the first player ever drafted by the Hornets. Chapman averaged 16.9 points per game in his rookie season. Chapman competed in the 1990 and 1991 Slam Dunk Contests, earning recognition for his dunks, where he would flip the ball. After two-and-a-half seasons with the Hornets, Chapman was traded midway through the 1991–1992 season to the Washington Bullets. He was injured, however, and could only participate in the final game of the season.

=== Washington Bullets and Miami Heat ===
On February 19, 1992, the Hornets traded Chapman to the Washington Bullets in exchange for Tom Hammonds. He played 60 games during the 1993–94 season and 45 games during the 1994–95 season. After getting off to a strong start in the 1994–95 season, Chapman injured his ankle.

The Bullets traded Chapman, with Terrence Rencher, to the Miami Heat for Ed Stokes and Jeff Webster in June 1995. Chapman averaged 14.8 points per game during the 1995–96 season. On February 23, 1996, he scored 39 points (converting 9-of-10 three-point attempts) and led an injury-plagued Miami Heat team, with an eight-man roster, to a 113–104 victory over the Chicago Bulls, handing the Bulls one of their 10 losses during their historic 72–10 run. Unfortunately, later in the season Chapman found himself on the injured list again and only participated in 56 games. He eventually signed with the Suns.

=== Phoenix Suns ===
Chapman played in 65 games, and scored 13 points per game for Phoenix for the 1996–1997 season. He played well in the Suns' last four games of the regular season. Chapman had two memorable games against the Seattle SuperSonics in the first round of the play-offs. In Game 1, he set a play-off record for made three-point shots by going 9 for 17 from behind the arc versus the Seattle SuperSonics. This record was later surpassed by Klay Thompson (11) in 2016 and Damian Lillard (12, 2OT) in 2021. In game four, Chapman hit an off-balance three-point shot on an inbounds pass to send the game to overtime, although the Suns went on to lose.

Chapman played 68 games during the 1997–1998 season for the Suns, scoring almost 16 points per game. However, he was injured again during the strike-shortened 1999 season, playing 38 games. During his time with the Suns, Chapman began having severe nerve pains in his foot, had seven surgeries, and began to regularly take Vicodin. After 53 games during the 1999–2000 season, Chapman's various injuries and declining performance led him to retire. In the spring before he retired, Chapman had an emergency appendectomy. After the surgery, he was prescribed OxyContin, which increased his drug dependency, in part because it also helped ease the social anxiety he felt.

Chapman played a total of 666 regular season NBA games, scoring 9,731 points for an average of 14.6 points per game, with 1,798 assists for an average of 2.7 assists per game, and 1,645 rebounds, for 2.5 rebounds per game.

Danny Ainge, who coached Chapman with the Phoenix Suns and became a close friend, said "Rex was a great competitor. I worried about keeping him healthy." and that "he was a very, very smart player. You could tell he was the son of a coach." Despite a respectable professional career, Chapman was never named an NBA All-Star.

== NBA career statistics ==
Legend
GP	Games played	GS	Games started	MPG	Minutes per game
FG%	Field goal percentage	3P%	3-point field goal percentage	FT%	Free throw percentage
RPG	Rebounds per game	APG	Assists per game	SPG	Steals per game
BPG	Blocks per game	PPG	Points per game	**Bold**	Career high

=== Regular season ===
Year	Team	GP	GS	MPG	FG%	3P%	FT%	RPG	APG	SPG	BPG	PPG
1988–89	Charlotte	**75**	44	29.6	.414	.314	.795	2.5	2.3	0.9	0.3	16.9
1989–90	Charlotte	54	52	32.6	.408	.331	.750	3.3	2.4	0.9	0.1	17.5
1990–91	Charlotte	70	**68**	30.0	.445	.324	.830	2.7	3.6	1.0	0.2	15.7
1991–92	Charlotte	21	11	26.0	.450	.296	.679	2.6	**4.1**	0.7	**0.4**	12.4
1991–92	Washington	1	0	22.0	.417	.000	−	**4.0**	3.0	1.0	0.0	10.0
1992-93	Washington	60	23	21.7	.477	.371	.810	1.5	1.9	0.6	0.2	12.5
1993-94	Washington	60	59	**33.8**	**.498**	**.388**	.816	2.4	3.1	1.0	0.1	**18.2**
1994-95	Washington	45	29	32.6	.397	.314	**.862**	2.5	2.8	**1.5**	0.3	16.2
1995-96	Miami	56	50	33.3	.426	.371	.735	2.6	3.0	0.8	0.2	14.0
1996–97	Phoenix	65	33	28.2	.443	.350	.832	2.8	2.8	0.8	0.1	13.8
1997–98	Phoenix	68	67	33.3	.427	.386	.781	2.5	3.0	1.0	0.2	15.9
1998–99	Phoenix	38	35	31.1	.359	.351	.835	2.7	2.9	0.9	0.2	12.1
1999–00	Phoenix	58	19	18.1	.388	.333	.756	1.5	1.2	0.4	0.0	6.6
Career		666	490	29.3	.430	.350	.800	2.5	2.7	0.9	0.2	14.6

=== Playoffs ===
Year	Team	GP	GS	MPG	FG%	3P%	FT%	RPG	APG	SPG	BPG	PPG
1996	Miami	3	3	29.3	.429	.231	−	2.0	1.7	**1.0**	0.0	9.0
1997	Phoenix	**5**	**5**	**38.2**	**.494**	**.458**	.680	**3.2**	**2.6**	0.4	0.0	**24.2**
1998	Phoenix	2	2	29.0	.261	.000	**.857**	0.0	2.0	**1.0**	0.0	9.0
1999	Phoenix	3	3	19.0	.286	.333	.750	2.0	2.0	0.3	0.0	5.7
Career		13	13	30.3	.419	.375	.722	2.2	2.2	0.6	0.0	14.1

== Post-playing life ==
After retiring from active play, Chapman's drug addiction intensified. He also began betting on horse racing daily. Betting on horses had been a distraction for him from childhood through his time in the NBA, where he hid his habit. Chapman eventually stopped betting and went to Gamblers Anonymous meetings. Urged by Ainge to enter rehab for his drug problem, Chapman was diagnosed with attention deficit disorder and depression, for which he was medicated. Following rehab, he was troubled by abdomen pain and had surgery to remove a pin from his wrist. Following the surgery, he was prescribed Vicodin and resumed his addiction, seeking treatment in 2002. After breaking the addiction, a doctor suggested he try Suboxone, a medicine used to treat opioid addiction, which successfully addressed a resurgence of his abdominal pains. Over time, Suboxone caused Chapman to lose energy and clouded his thinking.

Chapman held several jobs in rapid succession following his retirement. After his second time in rehab, he was hired by the Suns, first as a scout and later as Director of Basketball Operations. Chapman served as a color commentator on TNT during the 2004 and 2005 NBA playoffs. In 2005, he moved from Phoenix to accept a personnel scout position with the Minnesota Timberwolves. In 2006, Chapman accepted the position of vice president of player personnel with the Denver Nuggets, which he held for four years.

When Chapman left the Nuggets, his personal life was in turmoil. He was divorcing his wife, sharing custody of their four children. Chapman had also become estranged from his parents and sister. His life continued to spiral down after leaving basketball. Chapman worked in a variety of jobs as a basketball broadcaster, including for Grand Canyon University in 2013.

In September 2014, Chapman was arrested for shoplifting merchandise from an Apple Store in Scottsdale, Arizona. Chapman made it appear that he was paying for an item at self checkout, but left the store and pawned the item to pay for gambling debts. Returning to the store several times, he was eventually identified by multiple employees based on his tenure in the NBA. Following the arrest, Chapman entered a rehab facility in Louisville, Kentucky, run by a former University of Kentucky teammate. After a week of being drug free, his abdominal pain returned and he was taken to a hospital, where he was treated for an ulcer. Chapman's pain disappeared, but the experience angered him: "This whole time I've been thinking I've got this jones for pain medication, it was really just an ulcer". During this time in rehab, he was prescribed Zoloft for his depression and began deep psychotherapy for the first time.

Following his time in Louisville, Chapman continued to seek treatment in Texas and was hired by TNT to broadcast Kentucky's 2015 Final Four Game. In September 2015, Chapman pleaded guilty to four felony charges and was sentenced to probation. He agreed to pay more than $15,000 to the Apple Store and complete 750 hours of community service. Chapman eventually moved back to Lexington, where he states he stays clean, eats healthily, and swims daily. He hosts a pre-game show before Wildcat basketball games.

=== Social media influencer ===
Chapman has been labeled as a social media influencer for his activity on Twitter, with over a million followers. Chapman, however, does not agree with being labeled that way and commented in 2020, "I'm not even sure what that means... Me, an influencer? Man, I hope not." He first joined Twitter as part of his job as a broadcaster. He began attracting followers after posting a video of dolphins charging into a paddle boarder, the first in a series of "block or charge?" tweets.

After previously declining any kind of sponsorship, during the COVID-19 pandemic Chapman was able to raise more than $150,000 to support those experiencing financial hardship. Despite his social media success, Chapman said he is glad that it was not around when he was a professional athlete. Starting in 2019, Chapman was the television presenter of a Block or Charge show which appeared on Adult Swim, based on his tweets. The last episode aired in 2020. Until April 2023, he hosted a podcast called The Rex Chapman Show, which debuted on Basketballnews.com on March 16, 2021, with friend and actor Josh Hopkins.

=== Television ===
In January 2022, CNN announced that Chapman will appear as a host on CNN+, the network's streaming platform. The show, simply titled Rex Chapman, premiered on April 4, 2022, and aired four episodes before the service shut down on April 28.

In March 2022, Chapman served as a studio analyst for coverage of the NCAA men's basketball tournament.

In September 2022, entertainment business magazine Variety announced Chapman's podcast, “Charges with Rex Chapman”, would be turning into a TV show. Like the podcast, the new series will come from Portal A and Steve Nash's CTRL Media.

=== Memoir ===
In February 2024, Chapman's "blunt memoir about stardom, addiction, and American culture" It's Hard For Me To Live With Me was published.

== See also ==
- List of second-generation NBA players
