= Sylvester Gray =

American basketball player (born 1967)

Personal information
- Born: July 8, 1967 (age 59) Millington, Tennessee, U.S.
- Listed height: 6 ft 6 in (1.98 m)
- Listed weight: 230 lb (104 kg)

Career information
- High school: Bolton (Arlington, Tennessee)
- College: Memphis (1986–1988)
- NBA draft: 1988: 2nd round, 35th overall pick
- Drafted by: Miami Heat
- Playing career: 1988–2007
- Position: Small forward
- Number: 40

Career history
- 1988: Miami Tropics
- 1988–1989: Miami Heat
- 1989: Rapid City Thrillers
- 1989–1990: Cedar Rapids Silver Bullets
- 1990: Ginebra San Miguel
- 1990–1992: Stefanel Trieste
- 1992–1994: Scaligera Verona
- 1995: Florida Sharks
- 1996–1997: Yakima Sun Kings
- 1997: Scavolini Pesaro
- 1997: Alaska Aces
- 1997–1998: Dinamica Gorizia
- 1998–1999: Yakima Sun Kings
- 1999: Fenerbahçe
- 1999: Mydonose Kolejliler
- 1999–2001: Ducato / Montepaschi Siena
- 2001–2002: Fillattice Imola
- 2002–2004: Robur Basket Osimo
- 2004–2006: Tolentino
- 2006–2007: Supernova Montegranaro

Career highlights
- Second-team Parade All-American (1986); Tennessee Mr. Basketball (1986)
- Stats at NBA.com
- Stats at Basketball Reference

Sylvester Gray (born July 8, 1967) is an American former professional basketball player. He was selected by the Miami Heat in the second round (35th overall) of the 1988 NBA draft. A 6'6" small forward from Memphis State University, Gray played in only one NBA season.

As a member of the Heat during the 1988–89 season, he appeared in 55 games and averaged 8.0 ppg. Gray was the 4th ever draft pick in Miami Heat history.

He also played for CBA's Yakima Sun Kings, the Turkish club Fenerbahçe. He also suited up for the Alaska Aces and Ginebra San Miguel (Anejo Rhum) of the Philippine Basketball Association, coached by former player Robert Jaworski.

His life was chronicled in a book - "Sylvester. La storia di Sylvester Gray" - by writer Paola Rivolta, published as an e-book in English - "Sylvester. The Story of Sylvester Gray".

== Career statistics ==
Legend
GP	Games played	GS	Games started	MPG	Minutes per game
FG%	Field goal percentage	3P%	3-point field goal percentage	FT%	Free throw percentage
RPG	Rebounds per game	APG	Assists per game	SPG	Steals per game
BPG	Blocks per game	PPG	Points per game	**Bold**	Career high

=== NBA ===
==== Regular season ====
Year	Team	GP	GS	MPG	FG%	3P%	FT%	RPG	APG	SPG	BPG	PPG
1988–89	Miami	55	15	22.2	.420	.250	.673	5.2	2.1	.7	.5	8.0
