= Corey Crowder =

American basketball player (born 1969)

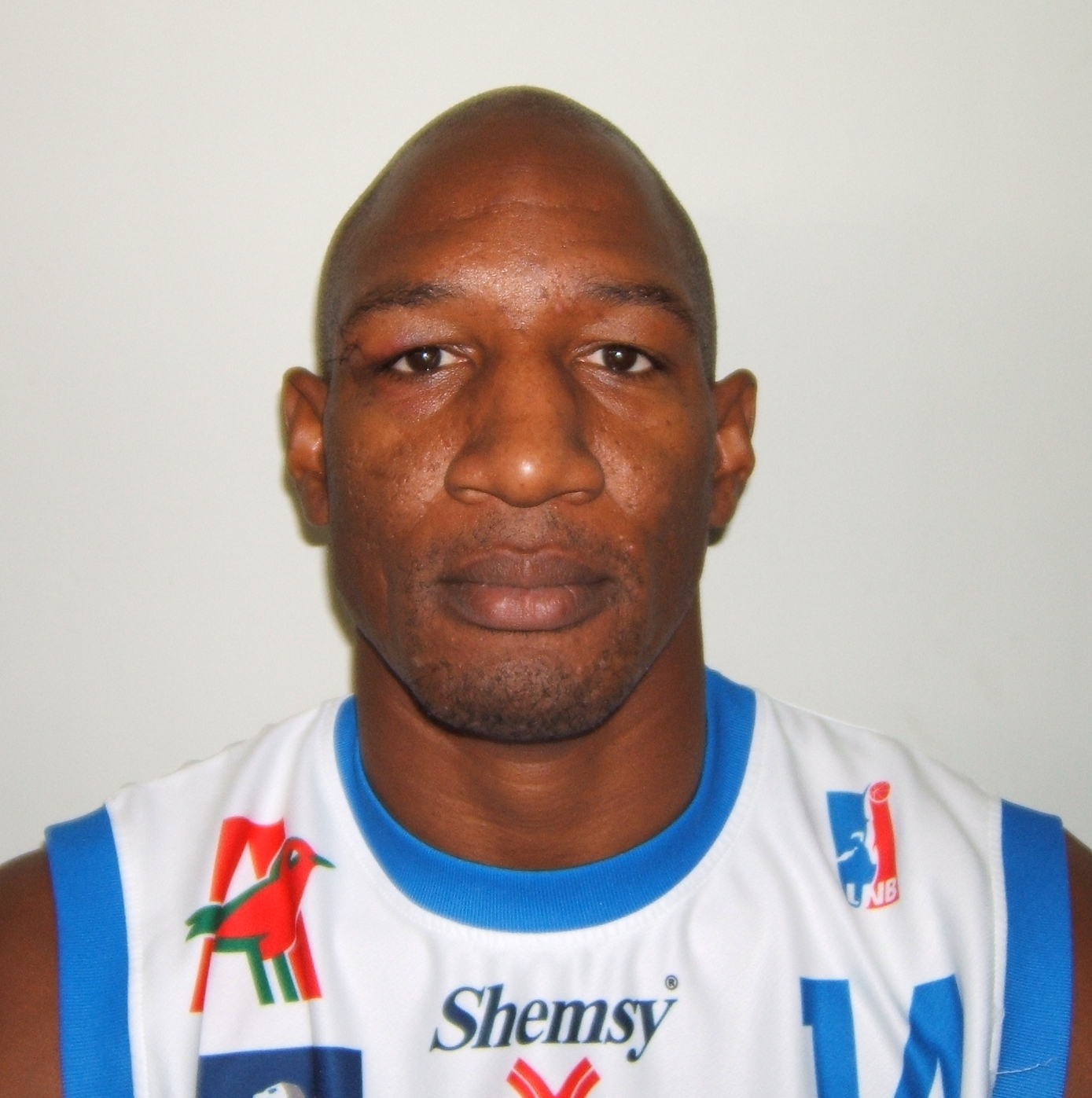

Personal information
- Born: April 13, 1969 (age 57) Carrollton, Georgia, U.S.
- Listed height: 6 ft 5 in (1.96 m)
- Listed weight: 214 lb (97 kg)

Career information
- High school: Carrollton (Carrollton, Georgia)
- College: Kentucky Wesleyan (1987–1991)
- NBA draft: 1991: undrafted
- Playing career: 1991–2006
- Position: Shooting guard / small forward
- Number: 15, 23

Career history
- 1991–1992: Utah Jazz
- 1992–1993: Scaligera Basket Verona
- 1993–1994: FC Barcelona
- 1994: San Antonio Spurs
- 1995: Rapid City Thrillers
- 1995: FC Barcelona
- 1995: CB Murcia
- 1995–1996: Florida Beachdogs
- 1996: Connecticut Pride
- 1996–1997: Pau Orthez
- 1997: La Crosse Bobcats
- 1997–1998: ASVEL Basket
- 1998–1999: Évreux
- 1999–2000: Hapoel Holon
- 2000–2001: Cholet Basket
- 2001–2005: Élan Chalon
- 2005–2006: St. Quentin

Career highlights
- Spanish Cup champion (1994); Spanish League champion (1995); NCAA Division II champion (1990); NABC Division II Player of the Year (1991); No. 23 retired by Kentucky Wesleyan Panthers
- Stats at NBA.com
- Stats at Basketball Reference

Jonathan Corey Crowder (born April 13, 1969) is an American former professional basketball player who played for the Utah Jazz and the San Antonio Spurs of the National Basketball Association (NBA).

A 6 ft 5 in (1.96 m) swingman from Kentucky Wesleyan College, Crowder played 58 games in the NBA between 1991 and 1995. He averaged 2.1 points per game for the Utah Jazz and San Antonio Spurs. Crowder later played in Italy, Spain, France and Israel. His son, Jae Crowder, last played for the Sacramento Kings of the NBA.
