= Isaiah Morris =

American basketball player (born 1969)

Personal information
- Born: April 2, 1969 (age 57) Richmond, Virginia, U.S.
- Listed height: 6 ft 8 in (2.03 m)
- Listed weight: 229 lb (104 kg)

Career information
- High school: Huguenot (Richmond, Virginia)
- College: San Jacinto (1988–1990); Arkansas (1990–1992)
- NBA draft: 1992: 2nd round, 37th overall pick
- Drafted by: Miami Heat
- Playing career: 1992–2007
- Position: Power forward
- Number: 35

Career history
- 1992–1993: Detroit Pistons
- 1993–1994: Teorematour Milano
- 1994: Fort Wayne Fury
- 1994–1995: Tri-City Chinook
- 1995: Trotamundos de Carabobo
- 1995–1996: Grupo AGB Huesca
- 1996: Unión Deportiva Española
- 1996–1997: Peñarol de Mar del Plata
- 1997: Guaiqueríes de Margarita
- 1997–1998: Apollon Limassol
- 1998: Quilmes de Mar del Plata
- 1998: Guaiqueríes de Margarita
- 1998: Gallitos de Isabela
- 1998–1999: Pogoń Ruda Śląska
- 1999: Guaiqueríes de Margarita
- 1999–2000: Pogoń Ruda Śląska
- 2000–2001: Proteas EKA AEL
- 2001: Avtodor Saratov
- 2001: Aris
- 2001–2002: Crvena zvezda
- 2002–2003: ENAD
- 2003: Toros de Aragua
- 2003: Maratonistas de Coamo
- 2003–2004: Stal Ostrów Wielkopolski
- 2004: Toros de Aragua
- 2006–2007: Arkansas Aeros
- Stats at NBA.com
- Stats at Basketball Reference

Isaiah Butch Morris (born April 2, 1969) is an American former professional basketball player. Morris played 25 games for the Detroit Pistons of the National Basketball Association (NBA) in the 1992-93 season. He played college basketball for San Jacinto College and the Arkansas Razorbacks.

== Professional career ==
Morris played two seasons at the University of Arkansas before being selected by the Miami Heat in the second round (10th pick, 37th overall) of the 1992 NBA draft. Morris played 25 games for the Detroit Pistons in the 1992-93 NBA season, averaging 2.2 points per game.

A six-foot, eight-inch tall power forward, Morris then moved overseas for most of the remainder of his career, playing in Venezuela, Spain, Uruguay, Poland, Yugoslavia (with Red Star Belgrade), Russia, the Dominican Republic, Greece, Cyprus and Puerto Rico. He returned to Arkansas to play for the Arkansas Aeros of the ABA in the 2006–07 season.

Morris was represented in his Basketball career by Gary Ebert.
