= Ed Stokes =

American basketball player (born 1971)

Personal information
- Born: September 3, 1971 (age 55) Syracuse, New York, U.S.
- Listed height: 7 ft 0 in (2.13 m)
- Listed weight: 264 lb (120 kg)

Career information
- High school: St. Bernard (Los Angeles, California)
- College: Arizona (1989–1993)
- NBA draft: 1993: 2nd round, 35th overall pick
- Drafted by: Miami Heat
- Playing career: 1993–2002
- Position: Center
- Number: 41

Career history
- 1993–1994: Panionios
- 1994: Olimpia Stefanel Milano
- 1995–1996: Aris
- 1996: Titanes de Morovis
- 1996–1997: Telemarket Roma
- 1997: Titanes de Morovis
- 1997: Toronto Raptors
- 1998: Mabo Pistoia
- 1998–1999: Keravnos
- 2000–2000: F.C. Porto
- 2001: Libertad de Sunchales
- 2001–2002: STB Le Havre
- 2002: Rimini Crabs

Career highlights
- Greek League All-Star (1994 I)
- Stats at NBA.com
- Stats at Basketball Reference
Medals
Men's basketball
Representing United States
FIBA U19 World Championship
Gold medal – first place	1991 Edmonton	Team competition

Edward Kobie Stokes (born September 3, 1971) is an American former professional basketball player, who played at the center position.

== College career ==
Stokes attended the University of Arizona, where he played college basketball with the Arizona Wildcats, from 1989 to 1993. During his collegiate career, he scored 984 points, grabbed 644 rebounds, and blocked 167 shots.

== Professional career ==
Stokes was selected by the Miami Heat, in the second round of the 1993 NBA draft, with the 35th overall pick. Stokes started his professional career in the Greek Basket League, playing with Panionios. During his pro career, Stokes went on to represent the following clubs: Stefanel Milano, Aris Thessaloniki, Titanes de Morovis, Telemarket Roma, the Toronto Raptors, Olimpia Basket Pistoia, Keravnos, FC Porto, Libertad de Sunchales, STB Le Havre, and Crabs Rimini.

In the NBA, the player rights to Stokes and Jeff Webster, were traded by the Miami Heat, to the Washington Bullets, in 1995, in exchange for Rex Chapman and Terrence Rencher. However, Stokes was released without appearing for the team in any regular season games. Stokes was also under preseason contracts with the Denver Nuggets, in October 1996, and with the Seattle SuperSonics (October 1997 and September–October 2000). He appeared sparingly for the Toronto Raptors in the 1997–98 season, in which he averaged 0.8 points and 1.0 rebounds, in 4.3 minutes per game, in 4 games played.
