= Nate Johnston =

American basketball player (born 1966)

Personal information
- Born: December 18, 1966 (age 59) Birmingham, Alabama
- Listed height: 6 ft 8 in (2.03 m)
- Listed weight: 209 lb (95 kg)

Career information
- High school: Belle Glade (Belle Glade, Florida)
- College: Tampa (1984–1988)
- NBA draft: 1988: 3rd round, 59th overall pick
- Drafted by: Miami Heat
- Playing career: 1988–2004
- Position: Power forward / small forward
- Number: 14, 33

Career history
- 1988–1989: Quad City Thunder
- 1989: Utah Jazz
- 1989–1990: Quad City Thunder
- 1991: Portland Trail Blazers
- 1990–1991: Grand Rapids Hoops
- 1991: Rapid City Thrillers
- 1991: Suncoast Sunblasters
- 1991–1992: Rapid City Thrillers
- 1992: Tampa Bay Sunblasters
- 1992–1993: Gandía Bàsquet
- 1993–1994: Rapid City Thrillers
- 1994–1995: Baloncesto Salamanca
- 1995–1996: Ortakoy S.K.
- 1996: Florida Sharks
- 1996–1997: Trotamundos de Carabobo
- 1997: Piratas de Quebradillas
- 1998: Deportivo Roca
- 1998: Capitanes de Arecibo
- 1998–1999: Gaiteros del Zulia
- 1999: Belgrano de San Nicolás
- 1999: Capitanes de Arecibo
- 1999–2000: Andino Sport Club
- 2000: Ovarense
- 2000: Gaiteros del Zulia
- 2000: Titanes de Morovis
- 2000–2001: Gaiteros del Zulia
- 2001: Oliveirense
- 2001–2002: Ovarense
- 2002–2003: Provincial Osorno
- 2003–2004: CAB Madeira

Career highlights
- Venezuelan League champion (2001); Portuguese League champion (2000); Portuguese Supercup champion (2000)
- Stats at NBA.com
- Stats at Basketball Reference

Nate Johnston (born December 18, 1966) is an American professional basketball player. He played briefly in the NBA for the Utah Jazz and the Portland Trail Blazers during the 1989–90 season. Johnston, a 6'8" forward, played collegiately at the University of Tampa from 1984–1988. Johnston was one of the first players drafted by the Miami Heat when they selected him in the third round (59th overall) of the 1988 NBA draft, prior to their inaugural season.
