= Rapid City Thrillers =

Basketball team

- Leagues: CBA 1984–1997; IBA 1998–1999
- Founded: 1984
- Folded: 1999
- History: Tampa Bay Thrillers; 1984–1987; Rapid City Thrillers; 1987–1995; Florida Beach Dogs; 1995–1997; Rapid City Thrillers; 1998–1999; Black Hills Gold; 1999–2000
- Arena: Rushmore Plaza Civic Center
- Location: Rapid City, South Dakota
- Team colors: red, white, blue
- Head coach: Bill Musselman 1985–1987; Tom Nissalke 1988; Flip Saunders 1989; Eric Musselman 1990; Keith Fowler 1991; Jim Calvin 1991; Eric Musselman 1992–1997
- Ownership: Pat Hall
- Championships: 3 (1985, 1986, 1987)
- Division/conference titles: 9 (1986, 1987, 1989, 1990, 1992, 1993, 1994, 1996, 1997)
Home	Away

The Rapid City Thrillers were a semi-professional basketball team in Rapid City, South Dakota, that competed in the Continental Basketball Association (CBA) beginning in the 1987 season. They were reincarnated in 1998 as an International Basketball Association franchise. One of the many notable players of the team was Keith Smart, who played for the Indiana Hoosiers when they won the NCAA tournament in 1987.

The Thrillers had some very notable head coaches in its time. First, Bill Musselman coached the team to three consecutive CBA titles during the 1980s. Musselman then moved to the NBA as coach of the Minnesota Timberwolves. Later, Flip Saunders coached the Thrillers for a season and later became head coach of the NBA's Washington Wizards. Keith Fowler coached the team during one of their only losing seasons. Eric Musselman (son of Bill Musselman) coached the team successfully for seven years but was never able to bring the championship back to the franchise, although the team was runner-up three separate times during its existence.

This team traced its history back to the Tampa Bay Thrillers of the Continental Basketball Association. They won consecutive CBA titles in their first two seasons. However, the team never drew well, and abruptly changed cities in 1987. The Thrillers moved to Rapid City at the conclusion of the regular season, but didn't stop the team's momentum, as they won their third consecutive title.

After eight and a half seasons, the team moved to West Palm Beach where they became the Florida Beach Dogs. The Beach Dogs lasted only two seasons folding after losing the championship series to the Oklahoma City Cavalry.

After the Thrillers left Rapid City, professional basketball continued in the form of the Black Hills Posse of the International Basketball Association. In 1998 the Black Hills Posse were sold to John Tuschman (former owner of the original Thrillers). Tuschman tried to spark the old spirit the Thrillers had from the late 1980s and early 1990s, by renaming the Posse to the Thrillers and bringing back the original "flaming basketball" logo. Tuschman was unsuccessful and the new Thrillers folded after the end of the 1998–99 season. The IBA continued for one more season in Rapid City, as the Black Hills Gold played in the 1999–2000 season for one year, before moving to Mitchell, South Dakota and becoming the South Dakota Gold. Rapid City has been without professional basketball since.

== Season-by-season ==
Year	League	GP	W	L	Pct.	Finish	Playoffs
1984/85	CBA	48	35	13	.729	2nd, Eastern	Won Eastern Division Semi Finals 3–0 Vs Lancaster Lightning, Won Eastern Division Finals 3–2 Vs Albany Patroons, Won CBA Championship 4–3 Vs Detroit Spirits
1985/86	CBA	48	34	14	.708	1st, Eastern	Won Eastern Division Semi Finals 4–3 Vs Albany Patroons, Won Eastern Division Finals 4–1 Vs Bay State Bombardiers, Won CBA Championship 4–1 Vs La Crosse Catbirds
1986/87	CBA	48	34	14	.708	1st, Eastern	Won Eastern Division Semi Finals 4–1 Vs Pensacola Tornados, Won Eastern Division Finals 4–0 Vs Albany Patroons, Won CBA Championship 4–1 Vs Rockford Lightning
1987/88	CBA	54	16	38	.296	6th, Western	did not qualify
1988/89	CBA	54	38	16	.704	1st, Western	Won Western Division Semi Finals 4–1 Vs Cedar Rapids Silver Bullets, Lost Western Division Finals 4–2 Vs Rockford Lightning
1989/90	CBA	56	42	14	.750	1st, National Midwest	Won National Conference Semi Finals 3–2 Vs San Jose Jammers, Won National Conference Finals 4–2 Vs Santa Barbara Islanders, Lost CBA Championship 4–1 Vs La Crosse Catbirds
1990/91	CBA	56	27	29	.482	2nd, American Midwest	Lost American Conference First Round 3–2 Vs Omaha Racers
1991/92	CBA	56	37	19	.661	1st, National Northern	Won National Conference Second Round 3–1 Vs Wichita Falls Texans, Won Western Conference Finals 3–2 Vs Omaha Racers, Lost CBA Championship 4–3 Vs La Crosse Catbirds
1992/93	CBA	56	44	12	.786	1st, National Midwest	Won National Conference First Round 3–0 Vs Tri-City Chinook, Lost National Conference Finals 3–2 Vs Omaha Racers
1993/94	CBA	56	37	19	.661	1st, National Midwest	Won National Conference First Round 3–2 Vs Wichita Falls Texans, Lost National Conference Finals 3–2 Vs Omaha Racers
1994/95	CBA	56	31	25	.554	4th, National West	Lost National Conference First Round 2–0 Vs Tri-City Chinook
1995/96	CBA	56	41	15	.732	1st, National Southern	Won National Conference First Round 3–0 Vs Omaha Racers, Lost National Conference Finals 3–2 Vs Sioux Falls Skyforce
1996/97	CBA	56	38	18	.679	1st, American	Won American Conference First Round 3–0 Vs Rockford Lightning, Won American Conference Finals 3–2 Vs Grand Rapids Hoops, Lost CBA Championship 4–2 Vs Oklahoma City Cavalry
1998/99	IBA	34	16	18	.471	3rd, West	Lost West Division Finals 2–1 Vs Magic City Snowbears
Totals	CBA	700	454	246	.649	–	3 CBA Championships
Totals	IBA	34	16	18	.471	–	1–2 Playoff Record
Totals	Franchise	734	470	264	.640	–	

== Notable players ==
- Keith Smart
- Brian Martin
- Sidney Lowe
- Ed Nealy
- Freeman Williams
- Richard Coffey
- Shelton Jones
- Stanley Brundy
- "Jumpin'" Joe Ward
- Larry Robinson
- Fennis Dembo
- Don Collins
- Ledell Eackles
- Craig Neal
- Tony Dawson
- Conner Henry
- Mark Macon
- Lorenzo Charles
- Pearl Washington
- Chris Jent
- Manute Bol
- Nate Johnston
- Leon Wood
- Alvin Robertson
- Constantin Popa
- Chris Whitney
- George McCloud
- Charles Smith
- Corey Crowder
