= 2016 FIBA Under-17 World Championship =

Tournament details
- Host country: Spain
- City: Zaragoza
- Dates: 23 June – 3 July
- Teams: 16 (from 5 confederations)
- Venues: 2 (in 1 host city)

Final positions
- Champions: United States (4th title)

Tournament statistics
- MVP: (United States) Collin Sexton
- Top scorer: (Bosnia and Herzegovina) Džanan Musa (34.0)
- Top rebounds: (Egypt) Ahmed Khalaf (14.0)
- Top assists: (Lithuania) Arnas Velička (4.7)
- PPG (Team): United States (106.1)
- RPG (Team): United States (57.6)
- APG (Team): United States (18.3)

Official website
- www.fiba.basketball

The 2016 FIBA Under-17 World Championship (Spanish: 2016 FIBA Campeonato Mundial Sub-17) was the 4th edition of the FIBA Under-17 World Championship, the biennial international men's youth basketball championship contested by the U17 national teams of the member associations of FIBA.

It was hosted by Zaragoza, Spain from 23 June to 3 July 2016. The United States won their fourth title in the competition after beating Turkey in the final, 96–56. USA extended their unbeaten streak in the U17 World Championship to 30–0.

== Teams ==
Sixteen teams have qualified for this year's edition.

- 2015 FIBA Africa Under-16 Championship
  - Egypt
  - Mali
- 2015 FIBA Asia Under-16 Championship
  - South Korea
  - Chinese Taipei
  - China
- 2015 FIBA Americas Under-16 Championship
  - United States
  - Canada
  - Argentina
  - Dominican Republic
- 2015 FIBA Europe Under-16 Championship
  - Bosnia and Herzegovina
  - Lithuania
  - Turkey
  - France
  - Finland (Note: Spain finished fourth at the 2015 FIBA Europe Under-16 Championship. By virtue of hosting this year's FIBA Under-17 World Championship, their European slot was given to the sixth-placed team, Finland.)
- 2015 FIBA Oceania Under-16 Championship
  - Australia
- Host country
  - Spain

== Preliminary round ==
The draw was held on 13 April 2016.

All times are local (UTC+2).

=== Group A ===
Pos	Team	Pld	W	L	PF	PA	PD	Pts
1	United States	3	3	0	307	168	+139	6
2	Turkey	3	2	1	213	201	+12	5
3	Egypt	3	1	2	206	246	−40	4
4	Chinese Taipei	3	0	3	172	283	−111	3

Source: FIBA
Rules for classification: 1) Points; 2) Head-to-head results; 3) Points difference; 4) Points scored.

23 June 2016
20:30

Boxscore

United States	119–45	Chinese Taipei
Scoring by quarter: 33–11, 34–13, 24–9, 28–12
Pts: Kevin Knox II 15; Rebs: Wiley 11; Asts: Howard 4		Pts: Lin 12; Rebs: Tang 9 Asts: Kao 4

Palacio de los Deportes, Utebo
Referees: Yener Yılmaz (TUR), Nicolas Fernandes (TAH), Gonzalo Salgueiro (URU)

23 June 2016
21:00

Boxscore

Egypt	61–71	Turkey
Scoring by quarter: 27–8, 11–21, 6–30, 17–11
Pts: Raafat 26; Rebs: Khalaf 15; Asts: Youssef 6		Pts: Konuk 13; Rebs: Atar 12; Asts: Akyüz 6

C.D.M. Siglo XXI, Zaragoza
Referees: Gediminas Petraitis (USA), Ingus Baumanis (LAT), Omar Bermúdez (MEX)

24 June 2016
20:30

Boxscore

Chinese Taipei	71–88	Egypt
Scoring by quarter: 13–21, 18–30, 19–13, 21–24
Pts: Lin 30; Rebs: Lin 6 Asts: Chen Y. 6		Pts: Abdelmaged 16; Rebs: Khalaf 16; Asts: Mostafa 4

Palacio de los Deportes, Utebo
Referees: Carlos Peruga (ESP), Nicolas Fernandes (TAH), Sebastián Negron (CHI)

24 June 2016
21:00

Boxscore

Turkey	66–84	United States
Scoring by quarter: 14–22, 17–25, 11–21, 24–16
Pts: Bitim 13; Rebs: Şenel 5 Asts: Bitim 3		Pts: Sexton 20; Rebs: Carter 14; Asts: Sexton 4

C.D.M. Siglo XXI, Zaragoza
Referees: Aare Halliko (EST), James Boyer (AUS), Juan Fernández (ARG)

26 June 2016
14:15

Boxscore

United States	104–57	Egypt
Scoring by quarter: 33–15, 19–16, 26–3, 26–23
Pts: Howard 19; Rebs: Brown, Wiley 11; Asts: Howard, Smart 6		Pts: Khalaf 17; Rebs: Mostafa 12; Asts: Mostafa 4

C.D.M. Siglo XXI, Zaragoza
Referees: Juan Fernández (ARG), Igor Mitrovski (MKD), Didier Shema-Maboko (RWA)

26 June 2016
14:15

Boxscore

Turkey	76–56	Chinese Taipei
Scoring by quarter: 29–11, 15–19, 13–11, 19–15
Pts: Duran 16; Rebs: Duran 15; Asts: three players 3		Pts: Lin 15; Rebs: Morisson 7 Asts: Tang 3

Palacio de los Deportes, Utebo
Referees: Ingus Baumanis (LAT), Matthew Kallio (CAN), Ivor Matějek (CZE)

=== Group B ===
Pos	Team	Pld	W	L	PF	PA	PD	Pts
1	Spain	3	3	0	210	165	+45	6
2	Lithuania	3	2	1	231	195	+36	5
3	Mali	3	1	2	184	229	−45	4
4	Argentina	3	0	3	153	189	−36	3

Source: FIBA
Rules for classification: 1) Points; 2) Head-to-head results; 3) Points difference; 4) Points scored.

23 June 2016
18:15

Boxscore

Spain	86–55	Mali
Scoring by quarter: 18–17, 16–6, 26–8, 26–24
Pts: González 20; Rebs: Martínez 14; Asts: Carrasco 5		Pts: Keita 18; Rebs: Keita 9 Asts: Keita 6

Palacio de los Deportes, Utebo
Referees: Juan Fernández (ARG), Tiffany Bird (USA), Amirhossein Safarzadeh (IRN)

23 June 2016
18:45

Boxscore

Argentina	57–74	Lithuania
Scoring by quarter: 12–24, 14–17, 17–19, 14–14
Pts: López 20; Rebs: Franco, López 8 Asts: López 3		Pts: Sargiūnas 15; Rebs: Balčiūnas, Kišūnas, 10; Asts: Vilys 4

C.D.M. Siglo XXI, Zaragoza
Referees: Daniel García (VEN), James Boyer (AUS), Susana Gómez (ESP)

24 June 2016
16:00

Boxscore

Mali	56–47	Argentina
Scoring by quarter: 12–15, 19–11, 14–12, 11–9
Pts: Haidara 13; Rebs: Coulibaly 14; Asts: Keita 3		Pts: López 18; Rebs: López 12; Asts: Franco 3

Palacio de los Deportes, Utebo
Referees: Gediminas Petraitis (USA), Tiffany Bird (USA), Mehdi Difallah (FRA)

24 June 2016
16:30

Boxscore

Lithuania	61–65	Spain
Scoring by quarter: 18–9, 22–23, 7–13, 14–20
Pts: Uleckas 12; Rebs: Balčiūnas, Vasiliauskas 10; Asts: Sargiūnas, Vasiliauskas 2		Pts: González 19; Rebs: Martínez 16; Asts: González 3

C.D.M. Siglo XXI, Zaragoza
Referees: Miloš Koljenšić (MNE), Omar Bermúdez (MEX), José Fernández (CRC)

26 June 2016
16:30

Boxscore

Argentina	49–59	Spain
Scoring by quarter: 8–14, 12–18, 19–11, 10–16
Pts: López 17; Rebs: Franco, López 6 Asts: López 3		Pts: Martínez 19; Rebs: Martínez 16; Asts: Busquets, Martínez 3

C.D.M. Siglo XXI, Zaragoza
Referees: José Fernández (CRC), Pavel Fuska (SVK), Miloš Koljenšić (MNE)

26 June 2016
16:30

Boxscore

Mali	73–96	Lithuania
Scoring by quarter: 22–30, 16–31, 15–21, 20–14
Pts: Coulibaly 29; Rebs: Sissoko 9 Asts: Keita 4		Pts: Kozys 20; Rebs: Balčiūnas 11; Asts: Sargiūnas, Velička 7

Palacio de los Deportes, Utebo
Referees: Daniel García (VEN), Nicolas Fernandes (TAH), Aare Halliko (EST)

=== Group C ===
Pos	Team	Pld	W	L	PF	PA	PD	Pts
1	Canada	3	3	0	278	200	+78	6
2	China	3	1	2	202	242	−40	4 (Note: China 3 Pts, +11 PD; Australia 3 Pts, −3 PD; Finland 3 Pts, −8 PD)
3	Australia	3	1	2	227	233	−6	4
4	Finland	3	1	2	195	227	−32	4

Source: FIBA
Rules for classification: 1) Points; 2) Head-to-head results; 3) Points difference; 4) Points scored.
Notes:

23 June 2016
09:45

Boxscore

Finland	65–58	China
Scoring by quarter: 23–12, 12–17, 13–14, 17–15
Pts: Valtonen 22; Rebs: Jantunen 8 Asts: Waxlax 4		Pts: Li 14; Rebs: Li 10; Asts: Chen 4

C.D.M. Siglo XXI, Zaragoza
Referees: José Fernández (CRC), Fabiano Huber (BRA), Manuel Mazzoni (ITA)

23 June 2016
12:00

Boxscore

Australia	78–81	Canada
Scoring by quarter: 17–22, 17–12, 16–26, 28–21
Pts: Elkaz 22; Rebs: Froling 8 Asts: Macdonald, Zunic 4		Pts: Shittu 22; Rebs: Shittu 12; Asts: Barrett 4

C.D.M. Siglo XXI, Zaragoza
Referees: Miloš Koljenšić (MNE), Aare Halliko (EST), Ivor Matějek (CZE)

25 June 2016
14:15

Boxscore

China	90–72	Australia
Scoring by quarter: 20–18, 26–12, 17–12, 27–30
Pts: Bai 21; Rebs: Zhu 7 Asts: Bai 4		Pts: Fullarton 25; Rebs: Froling 8 Asts: Colina 3

Palacio de los Deportes, Utebo
Referees: Carlos Peruga (ESP), Viola Györgyi (NOR), Igor Mitrovski (MKD)

25 June 2016
16:30

Boxscore

Canada	92–68	Finland
Scoring by quarter: 37–22, 19–9, 20–16, 16–21
Pts: Brazdeikis 17; Rebs: Barrett 10; Asts: Nembhard 6		Pts: Gustavson 17; Rebs: Gustavson, Jantunen 5 Asts: Heinonen 4

Palacio de los Deportes, Utebo
Referees: Gediminas Petraitis (USA), Ingus Baumanis (LAT), Takaki Kato (JPN)

26 June 2016
18:45

Boxscore

Australia	77–62	Finland
Scoring by quarter: 13–19, 18–11, 21–15, 25–17
Pts: Fullarton 19; Rebs: Froling 10; Asts: Froling 4		Pts: Valtonen 18; Rebs: three players 6 Asts: Valtonen 3

Palacio de los Deportes, Utebo
Referees: Carlos Peruga (ESP), Tiffany Bird (USA), Manuel Mazzoni (ITA)

26 June 2016
18:45

Boxscore

China	54–105	Canada
Scoring by quarter: 13–28, 16–28, 10–25, 15–24
Pts: Huang 15; Rebs: Zhu 8 Asts: Huang 3		Pts: Barrett 17; Rebs: Shittu 11; Asts: Nembhard, Sackey 5

C.D.M. Siglo XXI, Zaragoza
Referees: Sebastián Negron (CHI), James Boyer (AUS), Mehdi Difallah (FRA)

=== Group D ===
Pos	Team	Pld	W	L	PF	PA	PD	Pts
1	France	3	2	1	246	203	+43	5 (Note: France 3 Pts, +13 PD; Bosnia and Herzegovina 3 Pts, +1 PD; South Korea 3 Pts, −14 PD)
2	Bosnia and Herzegovina	3	2	1	254	228	+26	5
3	South Korea	3	2	1	252	260	−8	5
4	Dominican Republic	3	0	3	178	239	−61	3

Source: FIBA
Rules for classification: 1) Points; 2) Head-to-head results; 3) Points difference; 4) Points scored.
Notes:

23 June 2016
09:15

Boxscore

South Korea	90–84 (OT)	France
Scoring by quarter: 21–11, 18–22, 19–24, 20–21, Overtime: 12–6
Pts: Yang 32; Rebs: Yang 12; Asts: Lee J. 7		Pts: Hoard 41; Rebs: Bazille, Fevrier 9 Asts: Wiscart 5

Palacio de los Deportes, Utebo
Referees: Matthew Kallio (CAN), Sarah Carey (AUS), Tomislav Hordov (CRO)

23 June 2016
11:30

Boxscore

Bosnia and Herzegovina	84–59	Dominican Republic
Scoring by quarter: 25–9, 22–17, 13–13, 24–20
Pts: Musa 32; Rebs: Čerkezović, Mutić 12; Asts: Čerkezović 6		Pts: Rivera 17; Rebs: Minaya, Mirambeaux 6 Asts: Perdomo 3

Palacio de los Deportes, Utebo
Referees: Carlos Peruga (ESP), Mahdi Difallah (FRA), Takaki Kato (JPN)

25 June 2016
14:15

Boxscore

Dominican Republic	71–77	South Korea
Scoring by quarter: 10–16, 25–18, 16–21, 20–22
Pts: Mirambeaux 24; Rebs: Mirambeaux 22; Asts: Rivera 4		Pts: Shin 19; Rebs: Shin, Yang 7 Asts: Lee J. 5

C.D.M. Siglo XXI, Zaragoza
Referees: Miloš Koljenšić (MNE), Pavel Fuska (SVK), Matthew Kallio (CAN)

25 June 2016
16:30

Boxscore

France	84–65	Bosnia and Herzegovina
Scoring by quarter: 25–18, 18–18, 22–6, 19–23
Pts: Hoard 23; Rebs: Fevrier 10; Asts: Hoard 6		Pts: Musa 19; Rebs: Čerkezović 10; Asts: Musa 4

C.D.M. Siglo XXI, Zaragoza
Referees: Manuel Mazzoni (ITA), Danilo García (VEN), Sebastián Negron (CHI)

26 June 2016
21:00

Boxscore

Bosnia and Herzegovina	105–85	South Korea
Scoring by quarter: 32–18, 24–25, 24–25, 25–17
Pts: Musa 36; Rebs: Musa 11; Asts: Čampara 7		Pts: Lee J. 32; Rebs: Seo 3 Asts: Lee J. 6

C.D.M. Siglo XXI, Zaragoza
Referees: Gediminas Petraitis (USA), Takaki Kato (JPN), Yener Yılmaz (TUR)

26 June 2016
21:00

Boxscore

France	78–48	Dominican Republic
Scoring by quarter: 22–12, 21–12, 18–6, 17–18
Pts: Kayouloud 15; Rebs: Fevrier 11; Asts: three players 3		Pts: Mirambeaux 11; Rebs: Mirambeaux 7 Asts: Benitez 3

Palacio de los Deportes, Utebo
Referees: Gonzalo Salgueiro (URU), Tomislav Hordov (CRO), Fabiano Huber (BRA)

== Final round ==
Round of 16
28 June
United States	109
Argentina	56
28 June
China	70
South Korea	75
28 June
Egypt	65
Lithuania	80
28 June
Finland	38
France	60
28 June
Turkey	77
Mali	58
28 June
Canada	79
Dominican Republic	52
28 June
Chinese Taipei	60
Spain	112
28 June
Australia	75
Bosnia and Herzegovina	72

Quarterfinals
30 June
United States	133
South Korea	81
30 June
Lithuania (OT)	73
France	72
30 June
Turkey	80
Canada	74
30 June
Spain	74
Australia	63

Semifinals
1 July
United States	98
Lithuania	70
1 July
Turkey (OT)	83
Spain	79

Final
3 July
United States	96
Turkey	56
Third place
3 July
Lithuania	81
Spain	63

=== Round of 16 ===
28 June 2016
13:45

Boxscore

Egypt	65–80	Lithuania
Scoring by quarter: 11–22, 11–15, 17–15, 20–24
Pts: Khalaf 26; Rebs: Mostafa 18; Asts: four players 2		Pts: Sargiūnas 22; Rebs: Vasiliauskas 8 Asts: Kišūnas, Velička 4

Palacio de los Deportes, Utebo
Referees: Carlos Peruga (ESP), James Boyer (AUS), José Fernández (CRC)

28 June 2016
14:15

Boxscore

Finland	38–60	France
Scoring by quarter: 11–16, 12–18, 2–14, 13–12
Pts: Valtonen 9 Rebs: five players 5 Asts: Waxlax 3		Pts: Hoard 21; Rebs: Beyhurst, Fevrier 8 Asts: Beyhurst, Hoard 3

C.D.M. Siglo XXI, Zaragoza
Referees: Daniel García (VEN), Igor Mitrovski (MKD), Gonzalo Salgueiro (URU)

28 June 2016
16:00

Boxscore

Canada	79–52	Dominican Republic
Scoring by quarter: 12–17, 17–7, 28–15, 22–13
Pts: Brazdeikis 15; Rebs: Shittu 11; Asts: Barrett 3		Pts: Mirambeaux 16; Rebs: Mirambeaux 8 Asts: Benitez 6

Palacio de los Deportes, Utebo
Referees: Aare Halliko (EST), Ingus Baumanis (LAT), Tiffany Bird (USA)

28 June 2016
16:30

Boxscore

Turkey	77–58	Mali
Scoring by quarter: 21–9, 9–16, 25–14, 22–19
Pts: Atar 16; Rebs: Duran 19; Asts: Akyüz 5		Pts: Coulibaly 19; Rebs: Diallo, Diawara 8 Asts: Haidara, Keita 4

C.D.M. Siglo XXI, Zaragoza
Referees: Juan Fernández (ARG), Sebastián Negron (CHI), Amirhossein Safarzadeh (IRI)

28 June 2016
18:15

Boxscore

Australia	75–72	Bosnia and Herzegovina
Scoring by quarter: 21–15, 6–15, 20–22, 28–20
Pts: Elkaz 25; Rebs: Froling 10; Asts: Dalton 4		Pts: Musa 34; Rebs: Janković 14; Asts: three players 2

Palacio de los Deportes, Utebo
Referees: Gediminas Petraitis (USA), Omar Bermúdez (MEX), Mehdi Difallah (FRA)

28 June 2016
18:45

Boxscore

Chinese Taipei	60–112	Spain
Scoring by quarter: 18–31, 11–29, 15–35, 16–17
Pts: Lin 13; Rebs: Lin 6 Asts: Lin 7		Pts: Martínez 25; Rebs: Martínez 9 Asts: Alocén 7

C.D.M. Siglo XXI, Zaragoza
Referees: Yener Yılmaz (TUR), Takaki Kato (JPN), Manuel Mazzoni (ITA)

28 June 2016
20:30

Boxscore

United States	109–56	Argentina
Scoring by quarter: 26–5, 33–19, 30–18, 20–14
Pts: Gordon, Sexton 14; Rebs: Carter 10; Asts: T. Brown, Smart 4		Pts: Cáffaro 16; Rebs: Franco 10; Asts: Baralle, Farabello 2

Palacio de los Deportes, Utebo
Referees: Matthew Kallio (CAN), Nicolas Fernandes (TAH), Tomislav Hordov (CRO)

28 June 2016
21:00

Boxscore

China	70–75	South Korea
Scoring by quarter: 15–15, 12–19, 25–21, 18–20
Pts: Wang R. 16; Rebs: Li, Zhu 10; Asts: Huang 5		Pts: Lee J. 25; Rebs: Shin 9 Asts: Seo 4

C.D.M. Siglo XXI, Zaragoza
Referees: Miloš Koljenšić (MNE), Fabiano Huber (BRA), Ivor Matějek (CZE)

=== 9–16th classification playoffs ===
13th place game (July 2)
B4	Argentina	67
A4	Chinese Taipei	64
15th place game (July 2)
A3	Egypt	38
B3	Mali	61

13th-16th place semifinals (June 30)
B4	Argentina (3OT)	76
A3	Egypt	73
B3	Mali	61
A4	Chinese Taipei	77

9th-16th place quarterfinals (June 29)
B4	Argentina	74
C2	China	80
A3	Egypt	73
C4	Finland	84
B3	Mali	70
D4	Dominican Republic	74
A4	Chinese Taipei	75
D2	Bosnia and Herzegovina	105

9th-12th place semifinals (June 30)
C2	China	77
C4	Finland	57
D4	Dominican Republic	73
D2	Bosnia and Herzegovina	96

9th place game (July 2)
C2	China	84
D2	Bosnia and Herzegovina	88
11th place game (July 2)
C4	Finland	56
D4	Dominican Republic	65

==== 9–16th place quarterfinals ====
29 June 2016
13:45

Boxscore

Egypt	73–84	Finland
Scoring by quarter: 18–28, 23–6, 14–33, 18–17
Pts: Khalaf 20; Rebs: Khalaf 13; Asts: Raafat 4		Pts: Valtonen 24; Rebs: Jantunen, Valtonen 5 Asts: Heinonen 8

Palacio de los Deportes, Utebo
Referees: Matthew Kallio (CAN), Ingus Baumanis (LAT), Tomislav Hordov (CRO)

29 June 2016
16:00

Boxscore

Mali	70–74	Dominican Republic
Scoring by quarter: 14–23, 18–19, 16–24, 22–8
Pts: Diallo, Keita 11; Rebs: Diawara 12; Asts: Diawara 5		Pts: Frink 24; Rebs: Díaz, Frink 11; Asts: Benitez 5

Palacio de los Deportes, Utebo
Referees: Gediminas Petraitis (USA), Alexey Davydov (RUS), Manuel Mazzoni (ITA)

29 June 2016
18:15

Boxscore

Chinese Taipei	75–105	Bosnia and Herzegovina
Scoring by quarter: 15–21, 11–23, 19–22, 30–39
Pts: Lin 30; Rebs: Tang 8 Asts: Chen Y., Lin 3		Pts: Musa 50; Rebs: Mutić 8 Asts: Čampara 9

Palacio de los Deportes, Utebo
Referees: Juan Fernández (ARG), José Fernández (CRC), Gonzalo Salgueiro (URU)

29 June 2016
20:30

Boxscore

Argentina	74–80	China
Scoring by quarter: 22–27, 19–16, 11–19, 22–18
Pts: Cáffaro, López 19; Rebs: Franco 7 Asts: Farabello 3		Pts: Li, Zhu 16; Rebs: Zhu 15; Asts: Bai 4

Palacio de los Deportes, Utebo
Referees: Daniel García (VEN), James Boyer (AUS), Didier Shema-Maboko (RWA)

==== 13–16th place semifinals ====
30 June 2016
10:00

Boxscore

Mali	61–77	Chinese Taipei
Scoring by quarter: 19–18, 16–17, 14–23, 12–19
Pts: Haidara 13; Rebs: Keita 10; Asts: Maiga 7		Pts: Lin 20; Rebs: Chen F., Tang 9 Asts: Chen Y. 6

Palacio de los Deportes, Utebo
Referees: Sebastián Negrón (CHI), Abdelaziz Abassi (TUR), Ricardo Hayles (JAM)

30 June 2016
11:00

Boxscore

Argentina	76–73 (3OT)	Egypt
Scoring by quarter: 11–18, 12–11, 18–17, 11–6, Overtime: 11–11, 8–8, 5–2
Pts: López 20; Rebs: Farabello 10; Asts: Farabello 8		Pts: Khalaf 20; Rebs: Khalaf 22; Asts: Raafat 5

C.D.M. Siglo XXI, Zaragoza
Referees: José Fernandez (CRC), Igor Mitrovski (MKD), Amirhossein Safarzadeh (IRI)

==== 15th place game ====
2 July 2016
10:00

Boxscore

Egypt	38–61	Mali
Scoring by quarter: 12–16, 9–13, 7–12, 10–20
Pts: Khalaf 12; Rebs: Khalaf 13; Asts: three players 2		Pts: Coulibaly 22; Rebs: Dante 16; Asts: Haidara 3

Palacio de los Deportes, Utebo
Referees: Gonzalo Salgueiro (URU), Alexey Davydov (RUS), Didier Shema-Maboko (RWA)

==== 13th place game ====
2 July 2016
12:15

Boxscore

Argentina	67–64	Chinese Taipei
Scoring by quarter: 12–17, 22–18, 17–16, 16–13
Pts: López 23; Rebs: Cuassolo 7 Asts: Farabello 4		Pts: Lin 29; Rebs: Chen F. 7 Asts: Chen Y. 9

Palacio de los Deportes, Utebo
Referees: Aare Halliko (EST), Babacar Guèye (SEN), Ricardo Hayles (JAM)

==== 9–12th place semifinals ====
30 June 2016
12:15

Boxscore

Dominican Republic	73–96	Bosnia and Herzegovina
Scoring by quarter: 14–26, 20–28, 18–22, 21–20
Pts: Frink 23; Rebs: Frink 12; Asts: Benitez, Rivera 4		Pts: Musa 34; Rebs: Janković 18; Asts: Janković 10

Palacio de los Deportes, Utebo
Referees: Fabiano Huber (BRA), Ivor Matějek (CZE), Gonzalo Salgueiro (URU)

30 June 2016
14:30

Boxscore

China	77–57	Finland
Scoring by quarter: 11–16, 16–21, 26–7, 24–13
Pts: Wang Y. 21; Rebs: Li 10; Asts: Chen 4		Pts: Heinonen 11; Rebs: Pihlajamäki 8 Asts: Heinonen 3

Palacio de los Deportes, Utebo
Referees: Tomislav Hordov (CRO), Tiffany Bird (USA), Pavel Fuska (SVK)

==== Eleventh place game ====
2 July 2016
14:30

Boxscore

Finland	56–65	Dominican Republic
Scoring by quarter: 19–17, 19–11, 7–19, 11–18
Pts: Heinonen 11; Rebs: Jantunen 11; Asts: five players 2		Pts: Díaz 18; Rebs: Benitez, Díaz 7 Asts: Benitez, Melo 4

Palacio de los Deportes, Utebo
Referees: Gediminas Petraitis (USA), Pavel Fuska (SVK), Sebastián Negron (CHI)

==== Ninth place game ====
2 July 2016
16:45

Boxscore

China	84–88	Bosnia and Herzegovina
Scoring by quarter: 18–28, 12–21, 28–12, 22–27
Pts: Chen 30; Rebs: Zhu 9 Asts: Bai 8		Pts: Musa 33; Rebs: Janković, Musa 9 Asts: Čampara 5

Palacio de los Deportes, Utebo
Referees: Yener Yılmaz (TUR), Fabiano Huber (BRA), Ivor Matějek (CZE)

=== Quarterfinals ===
30 June 2016
13:30

Boxscore

Turkey	80–74	Canada
Scoring by quarter: 17–16, 23–20, 13–18, 27–20
Pts: Atar 28; Rebs: Atar 15; Asts: three players 2		Pts: Barrett 33; Rebs: Djuricic, Nembhard 8 Asts: Nembhard 3

C.D.M. Siglo XXI, Zaragoza
Referees: Daniel García (VEN), Omar Bermúdez (MEX), Mehdi Difallah (FRA)

30 June 2016
16:00

Boxscore

Lithuania	73–72 (OT)	France
Scoring by quarter: 25–10, 13–16, 10–20, 15–17, Overtime: 10–9
Pts: Velička 23; Rebs: Balciunas, Kisunas 6 Asts: Velička 5		Pts: Hoard 21; Rebs: four players 8 Asts: Beyhurst 4

C.D.M. Siglo XXI, Zaragoza
Referees: Miloš Koljenšić (MNE), Matthew Kallio (CAN), Takaki Kato (JPN)

30 June 2016
18:30

Boxscore

Spain	74–63	Australia
Scoring by quarter: 11–9, 19–24, 17–14, 27–16
Pts: Martínez 26; Rebs: Martínez 9 Asts: McCarthy 3		Pts: Fullarton 16; Rebs: Bines, Froling 13; Asts: Froling 3

C.D.M. Siglo XXI, Zaragoza
Referees: Gediminas Petraitis (USA), Aare Halliko (EST), Manuel Mazzoni (ITA)

30 June 2016
21:00

Boxscore

United States	133–81	South Korea
Scoring by quarter: 26–17, 39–15, 31–21, 37–28
Pts: Sexton 24; Rebs: Jackson 8 Asts: Smart 7		Pts: Yang 14; Rebs: Lee J., Shin 3 Asts: Shin 4

C.D.M. Siglo XXI, Zaragoza
Referees: Carlos Peruga (ESP), Juan Fernández (ARG), Yener Yılmaz (TUR)

=== 5–8th classification ===
5–8th place semifinals
1 July
South Korea	61
France	119
1 July
Canada	96
Australia	58

Fifth place
3 July
France	68
Canada	99
Seventh place
3 July
South Korea	76
Australia	83

==== 5–8th place semifinals ====
1 July 2016
16:45

Boxscore

Canada	96–58	Australia
Scoring by quarter: 27–12, 25–12, 34–18, 10 –16
Pts: Barrett 23; Rebs: Kirkwood 8 Asts: Shittu 4		Pts: Froling 12; Rebs: Froling 9 Asts: Fullarton 5

Palacio de los Deportes, Utebo
Referees: Carlos Peruga (ESP), Tiffany Bird (USA), Tomislav Hordov (CRO)

1 July 2016
19:00

Boxscore

South Korea	61–119	France
Scoring by quarter: 10–28, 14–34, 15–25, 22–32
Pts: Seomoon 25; Rebs: Lee J., Shin 6 Asts: four players 3		Pts: Hoard 22; Rebs: Beyhurst 11; Asts: Beyhurst 5

Palacio de los Deportes, Utebo
Referees: Fabiano Huber (BRA), Omar Bermúdez (MEX), Manuel Mazzoni (ITA)

==== Seventh place game ====
3 July 2016
13:30

Boxscore

South Korea	76–83	Australia
Scoring by quarter: 16–20, 16–20, 20–21, 24–22
Pts: Lee J. 21; Rebs: Shin 10; Asts: Lee J. 5		Pts: Bines 13; Rebs: Froling 15; Asts: Fullarton 4

C.D.M. Siglo XXI, Zaragoza
Referees: José Fernández (CRC), Fabiano Huber (BRA), Manuel Mazzoni (ITA)

==== Fifth place game ====
3 July 2016
16:00

Boxscore

France	68–99	Canada
Scoring by quarter: 17–21, 13–22, 18–36, 20–20
Pts: Hoard 17; Rebs: Fevrier 8 Asts: Beyhurst 8		Pts: Brazdeikis 26; Rebs: Brazdeikis 10; Asts: Nembhard 7

C.D.M. Siglo XXI, Zaragoza
Referees: Ingus Baumanis (LAT), Daniel García (VEN), Tomislav Hordov (CRO)

=== Semifinals ===
1 July 2016
18:30

Boxscore

Turkey	83–79 (OT)	Spain
Scoring by quarter: 18–19, 13–24, 22–14, 20–16, Overtime: 10–6
Pts: Bitim 23; Rebs: Duran 14; Asts: Duran, Şenel 2		Pts: Martínez 20; Rebs: Martínez 11; Asts: McCarthy 5

C.D.M. Siglo XXI, Zaragoza
Referees: Miloš Koljenšić (MNE), Juan Fernández (ARG), Aare Halliko (EST)

1 July 2016
21:00

Boxscore

United States	98–70	Lithuania
Scoring by quarter: 26–23, 21–14, 28–10, 23–23
Pts: Howard 16; Rebs: Brown, Gordon 9 Asts: four players 3		Pts: Sargiūnas 15; Rebs: Vasiliauskas 6 Asts: Velička 6

C.D.M. Siglo XXI, Zaragoza
Referees: Matthew Kallio (CAN), Mehdi Difallah (FRA), José Fernández (CRC)

=== Third place game ===
3 July 2016
18:30

Boxscore

Lithuania	81–63	Spain
Scoring by quarter: 23–8, 21–21, 22–10, 15–24
Pts: Velička 18; Rebs: Kozys 12; Asts: Velička 8		Pts: Martínez 17; Rebs: Martínez 15; Asts: Alocén 7

C.D.M. Siglo XXI, Zaragoza
Referees: Gediminas Petraitis (USA), Mehdi Difallah (FRA), Yener Yılmaz (TUR)

=== Final ===
3 July 2016
21:00

Boxscore

United States	96–56	Turkey
Scoring by quarter: 25–10, 25–10, 23–16, 23–20
Pts: Trent 17; Rebs: Carter 8 Asts: Sexton 8		Pts: Atar 13; Rebs: Duran 9 Asts: Akyüz, Ayca 2

C.D.M. Siglo XXI, Zaragoza
Referees: Carlos Peruga (ESP), Juan Fernández (ARG), Miloš Koljenšić (MNE)

== Final standings ==
Rank	Team	Record
1st place, gold medalist(s)	United States	7–0
2nd place, silver medalist(s)	Turkey	5–2
3rd place, bronze medalist(s)	Lithuania	5–2
4th	Spain	5–2
5th	Canada	6–1
6th	France	4–3
7th	Australia	3–4
8th	South Korea	3–4
9th	Bosnia and Herzegovina	5–2
10th	China	3–4
11th	Dominican Republic	2–5
12th	Finland	2–5
13th	Argentina	2–5
14th	Chinese Taipei	1–6
15th	Mali	2–5
16th	Egypt	1–6

== Awards ==
2016 FIBA Under-17
World Championship winner

United States
4th title

Most Valuable Player
(United States) Collin Sexton

All-Tournament Team

- (United States) Collin Sexton
- (Lithuania) Arnas Velička
- (Bosnia and Herzegovina) Džanan Musa
- (Spain) Sergi Martínez
- (United States) Wendell Carter Jr.

== Statistics ==
Points

Name	PPG
(Bosnia and Herzegovina) Džanan Musa	34.0
(France) Jaylen Hoard	22.4
(Chinese Taipei) Lin Ting-chien	21.3
(Spain) Sergi Martínez	19.9
(South Korea) Lee Jung-hyun	18.9

Rebounds

Name	RPG
(Egypt) Ahmed Khalaf	14.0
(Spain) Sergi Martínez	12.9
(Turkey) Ahmet Can Duran	12.0
(Egypt) Esam Mostafa	11.6
(Australia) Sam Froling	10.4
(Dominican Republic) Anderson Mirambeaux	10.4

Assists

Name	APG
(Lithuania) Arnas Velička	4.7
(Chinese Taipei) Chen Yu-wei	4.3
(United States) Collin Sexton	4.2
(Spain) Carlos Alocén	4.0
(Bosnia and Herzegovina) Sani Čampara	3.9
(South Korea) Lee Jung-hyun	3.9

Blocks

Name	BPG
(Egypt) Ahmed Khalaf	4.4
(China) Zhu Rongzhen	1.4
(France) Olivier Sarr	1.4
(Australia) Sam Froling	1.3
(France) Yves Pons	1.3
(Turkey) Berke Atar	1.3

Steals

Name	SPG
(Canada) Simisola Shittu	3.7
(Canada) Andrew Nembhard	3.0
(United States) Troy Brown	2.9
(Lithuania) Arnas Velička	2.8
(Mali) Lassana Haidara	2.8

Efficiency

Name	EFFPG
(Bosnia and Herzegovina) Džanan Musa	27.7
(Egypt) Ahmed Khalaf	26.0
(France) Jaylen Hoard	20.3
(Spain) Sergi Martínez	20.0
(Australia) Sam Froling	18.1
