= 1980 McDonald's All-American Boys Game =

American high school basketball game

West	East
135	111
- Date: April 12, 1980
- Venue: Oakland Coliseum Arena, Oakland, CA
- MVP: Russell Cross
- Attendance: 8,429

McDonald's All-American

The 1980 McDonald's All-American Boys Game was an All-star basketball game played on Saturday, April 12, 1980 at the Oakland Coliseum Arena in Oakland, California. The game's rosters featured the best and most highly recruited high school boys graduating in 1980. The game was the 3rd annual version of the McDonald's All-American Game first played in 1978.

== 1980 game ==
The game was not televised, but highlights were aired by NBC Sports during Sportsworld on April 13. The East roster could count on two promising big men, Earl Jones and Sam Perkins; the West had guard Doc Rivers and centers Russell Cross and Tim McCormick. The game saw the West prevail 135-111 thanks to the scoring efforts of Cross (20 points), Rivers (20), Kenny Fields (18) and James Banks (16). The top scorer for the East was Gary Springer with 18 points. Sam Perkins scored 12 points and had 24 rebounds, an all-time record for the McDonald's game. Russell Cross, who scored 12 of his 15 free throws in addition to 4 field goals, received the MVP award. Of the 25 players, 13 went on to play at least 1 game in the NBA.

=== East roster ===
No.	Name	Height	Weight	Position	Hometown	High school	College of Choice
–	Bret Bearup	6-9	–	F	Greenlawn, NY, U.S.	Harborfields	Kentucky
–	Clarke Bynum	6-8	–	F	Sumter, SC, U.S.	Wilson Hall Academy	Clemson
–	Matt Doherty	6-7	–	F	Hicksville, NY, U.S.	Holy Trinty Diocesan	North Carolina
–	Vern Fleming	6-5	–	G	Astoria, NY, U.S.	Mater Christi	Georgia
–	Derek Harper	6-3	–	G	West Palm Beach, U.S.	North Shore	Illinois
–	Pete Holbert	6-7	–	F	Fairfax, VA, U.S.	W. T. Woodson	Maryland
–	Earl Jones	6-11	–	C	Washington, D.C., U.S.	Spingarn	District of Columbia
–	Glenn Mayers	6-3	–	G	Mouth of Wilson, VA, U.S.	Oak Hill Academy	Wake Forest
–	Lonnie McFarlan	6-5	–	F	Philadelphia, PA, U.S.	Roman Catholic	St. Joseph's
–	Sam Perkins	6-9	–	F	Latham, NY, U.S.	Shaker	North Carolina
–	Tom Sluby	6-4	–	G	Washington, D.C., U.S.	Gonzaga	Notre Dame
–	Gary Springer	6-7	–	F	New York, NY, U.S.	Benjamin Franklin	Iona

=== West roster ===
No.	Name	Height	Weight	Position	Hometown	High school	College of Choice
–	James Banks	6-6	–	F	Atlanta, GA, U.S.	Hoke Smith	Georgia
–	Russell Cross	6-10	–	C	Chicago, IL, U.S.	Manley	Purdue
–	Kenny Fields	6-7	–	G	Los Angeles, CA, U.S.	Verbum Dei	UCLA
–	Ralph Jackson	6-3	–	G	Inglewood, CA, U.S.	Inglewood	UCLA
–	Joe Kleine	6-10	–	C	Slater, MO, U.S.	Slater	Notre Dame
–	Jim Master	6-4	–	G	Fort Wayne, IN, U.S.	Paul Harding	Kentucky
–	Tim McCormick	6-10	–	C	Clarkston, MI, U.S.	Clarkston	Michigan
–	Ricky Norton	6-1	–	G	Arkadelphia, AR, U.S.	Okolona	Arkansas
–	Jim Petersen	6-10	–	F	St. Louis Park, MN, U.S.	St. Louis Park	Minnesota
–	Doc Rivers	6-4	185	G	Maywood, IL, U.S.	Proviso East	Marquette
–	Charlie Sitton	6-8	–	F	McMinnville, OR, U.S.	McMinnville	Oregon State
–	Barry Spencer	6-7	–	F	Redford, MI, U.S.	Catholic Central	Notre Dame

=== Coaches ===
The East team was coached by:

- Head Coach John Wood of Spingarn High School (Washington, D.C.)

The West team was coached by:

- Head Coach Nick Robertson of McMinnville High School (McMinnville, Oregon)
