= 1985 McDonald's All-American Boys Game =

American high school basketball game

East	West
128	98
	1st half	2nd half	Total
East	67	61	128
West	53	45	98
- Date: April 13, 1985
- Venue: Moody Coliseum, University Park, TX
- MVP: Walker Lambiotte
- Referees: 1 Paul Galvan; 2 Mike Tanco; 3 Lynn Shortnacy
- Attendance: 9,007
- Network: ESPN
- Announcers: Jim Thacker, Dick Vitale and Bucky Waters

McDonald's All-American

The 1985 McDonald's All-American Boys Game was an All-star basketball game played on Saturday, April 13, 1985 at the Moody Coliseum in University Park, Texas. The game's rosters featured the best and most highly recruited high school boys graduating in 1985. The game was the 8th annual version of the McDonald's All-American Game first played in 1978.

== 1985 game ==
The game was telecast by ESPN. 1985 was the first year in which the McDonald's game was televised. The East team had 3 North Carolina commits (Bucknall, Lebo and Madden) and two of the top ranked centers of the 1985 class, Danny Ferry and Pervis Ellison. The West team had many forwards, including Ed Horton and Tony Kimbro, and center Tito Horford, a heavily recruited center born in the Dominican Republic. During the game Walker Lambiotte scored 24 points 10 for 12 from the field and 4 for 7 from the free throw line, winning the MVP award. Terry Dozier and Danny Ferry scored 17 points, and Mark Stevenson had 16; for the West team, Lowell Hamilton and Tito Horford both scored 13 points, while Ed Horton had 12. Of the 25 players, 15 went on to play at least 1 game in the NBA.

=== East roster ===
No.	Name	Height	Weight	Position	Hometown	High school	College of Choice
5	Michael Porter	5-11	165	G	Dublin, VA, U.S.	Pulaski County	Virginia
14	Jeff Lebo	6-2	180	G	Carlisle, PA, U.S.	Carlisle	North Carolina
21	Tom Hammonds	6-7½	210	F	Crestview, FL, U.S.	Crestview	Georgia Tech
22	Kevin Madden	6-5½	210	F	Staunton, VA, U.S.	Robert E. Lee	North Carolina
25	Steve Bucknall	6-6	205	F	Byfield, MA, U.S.	Governor Dummer Academy	North Carolina
30	Irving Thomas	6-8	215	F	Miami, FL, U.S.	Miami Carol City	Kentucky
31	Terry Dozier	6-9	190	F	Baltimore, MD, U.S.	Paul Laurence Dunbar	South Carolina
32	Walker Lambiotte	6-6	195	F	Woodstock, VA, U.S.	Central	NC State
33	Pooh Richardson	6-0	165	G	Philadelphia, PA, U.S.	Benjamin Franklin	UCLA
35	Danny Ferry	6-9½	230	C	Hyattsville, MD, U.S.	DeMatha	Duke
42	Pervis Ellison	6-9	195	C	Savannah, GA, U.S.	Savannah	Louisville
54	Rodney Walker	6-10	225	C	Baltimore, MD, U.S.	Cardinal Gibbons	Syracuse
55	Mark Stevenson	6-5	190	G	Philadelphia, PA, U.S.	Roman Catholic	Notre Dame

=== West roster ===
No.	Name	Height	Weight	Position	Hometown	High school	College of Choice
3	Quin Snyder	6-2	160	G	Mercer Island, WA, U.S.	Mercer Island	Duke
10	Sean Elliott	6-7	185	F	Tucson, AZ, U.S.	Cholla	Arizona
21	Roy Marble	6-6	190	F	Flint, MI, U.S.	Beecher	Iowa
23	Rick Calloway	6-6	190	F	Cincinnati, OH, U.S.	Withrow	Indiana
24	Ed Horton	6-8	205	F	Springfield, IL, U.S.	Lanphier	Iowa
30	Jerome Lane	6-6	195	G	Akron, OH, U.S.	St. Vincent–St. Mary	Pitt
32	Tom Lewis	6-7	200	F	Santa Ana, CA, U.S.	Mater Dei	USC
33	Kip Jones	6-7	200	F	Decatur, IN, U.S.	Bellmont	Purdue
34	Tito Horford	7-1	240	C	Houston, TX, U.S.	Marian Christian	Houston
44	Tony Kimbro	6-8	205	F	Louisville, KY, U.S.	Seneca	Louisville
45	Lowell Hamilton	6-7	202	F	Chicago, IL, U.S.	Providence St. Mel	Illinois
50	Doug Roth	6-11	250	C	Knoxville, TN, U.S.	Karns	Tennessee

=== Coaches ===
The East team was coached by:

- Head Coach Ed Kershner of Osceola High School (Kissimmee, Florida)

The West team was coached by:

- Head Coach Bill Green of Marion High School (Marion, Indiana)

== All-American Week ==
=== Contest winners ===
- The 1985 Slam Dunk contest was won by Michael Porter.
