= McDonald's All-American Game =

All-star basketball game for high school graduates

- Frequency: Annual
- Country: United States
- Years active: 1978–present
- Founder: Bob Geoghan
- Participants: High school basketball players
- Sponsor: McDonald's

The McDonald's All-American Game is an American all-star basketball game played each year for boys' and girls' high school basketball graduates. Consisting of the top players, each team plays a single exhibition game after the conclusion of the high-school basketball season, in an East vs. West format. As part of the annual event, boys and girls compete in a slam dunk contest and a three-point shooting competition, and compete alongside All-American Game alumni in a timed team shootout. The last of these competitions replaced separate overall timed skills competitions for boys and girls. While it is rare for girls to compete in the slam dunk contest, occasionally a girl will elect to participate. The contest has been won by a woman three times: Candace Parker won in 2004, Fran Belibi in 2019, and most recently in 2022 by Ashlyn Watkins. The boys' game has been played annually since 1978, and the girls' game has been played annually since 2002.

The McDonald's All-American designation began in 1977 with the selection of the inaugural team. That year, the All-Americans played in the McDonald's Capital Classic all-star game against a group of high school stars from the Washington, D.C. area. The following year, the McDonald's All American Game began with a boys contest between the East and West squads. In 2002, with the addition of a girls contest, the current girl-game / boy-game doubleheader format began.

The McDonald's All-American Team is the best-known of the American high-school basketball All-American teams. Designation as a McDonald's All-American instantly brands a player as one of the top high-school players in the United States. Selected athletes often go on to compete in college basketball. All but four of the teams to win the NCAA men's championship since 1978 have had at least one McDonald's All-American on their rosters. The exceptions are the 2002 Maryland Terrapins, the 2014 UConn Huskies, the 2021 Baylor Bears, and the 2023 UConn Huskies. The 2023 Final Four was the first in which no McDonald's All-Americans participated.

The teams are sponsored by McDonald's. Proceeds from the annual games go to local Ronald McDonald House Charities (RMHC) and their Ronald McDonald House programs.

== Greatest Boys McDonald's All-Americans ==
On January 31, 2012, McDonald's All-American Games unveiled its list of 35 of the Greatest McDonald's All-Americans, released in celebration of the 35th Anniversary of the McDonald's All-American High School Boys Basketball Game. In 2017, five players were added to the list in celebration of the 40th Anniversary. Another five players were added in 2022 to celebrate the 45th Anniversary of the game.

The Greatest Boys McDonald's All-Americans list includes some of the top names in men's basketball history, and features past and present Olympics, NBA and NCAA stars. The players were selected by members of the McDonald's All-American Games Selection Committee. In determining the list, all past McDonald's All-Americans were considered based on their high school careers and performances in the McDonald's All-American Games, success at the collegiate and professional level, and post-career accomplishments. The full list of players includes:

^	Inducted in 2017
*	Inducted in 2022
†	Inducted into the Naismith Memorial Basketball Hall of Fame

Year	Player	College
1977	Magic Johnson†	Michigan State
1979	Clark Kellogg	Ohio State
1979	Ralph Sampson†	Virginia
1979	Isiah Thomas†	Indiana
1979	Dominique Wilkins†	Georgia
1979	James Worthy†	North Carolina
1980	Sam Perkins	North Carolina
1980	Glenn "Doc" Rivers	Marquette
1981	Patrick Ewing†	Georgetown
1981	Michael Jordan†	North Carolina
1981	Chris Mullin†	St. John's
1983	Kenny Smith	North Carolina
1984	Danny Manning	Kansas
1987	Larry Johnson	Odessa / UNLV
1988	Christian Laettner	Duke
1988	Alonzo Mourning†	Georgetown
1989	Bobby Hurley	Duke
1989	Shaquille O'Neal†	LSU
1990	Grant Hill†	Duke
1991	Glenn Robinson	Purdue
1991	Chris Webber*†	Michigan
1992	Jason Kidd†	California
1993	Jerry Stackhouse	North Carolina
1993	Rasheed Wallace*	North Carolina
1995	Chauncey Billups†	Colorado
1995	Vince Carter†	North Carolina
1995	Kevin Garnett†	Did not attend
1995	Paul Pierce†	Kansas
1996	Kobe Bryant†	Did not attend
1996	Jermaine O'Neal*	Did not attend
1999	Jay Williams	Duke
2002	Carmelo Anthony†	Syracuse
2002	Chris Bosh*†	Georgia Tech
2002	Amar'e Stoudemire†	Did not attend
2003	LeBron James	Did not attend
2003	Chris Paul	Wake Forest
2004	Dwight Howard†	Did not attend
2005	Tyler Hansbrough	North Carolina
2006	Kevin Durant	Texas
2007	Blake Griffin^	Oklahoma
2007	James Harden^	Arizona State
2007	Kevin Love^	UCLA
2007	Derrick Rose	Memphis
2010	Kyrie Irving^	Duke
2011	Anthony Davis^	Kentucky

== Annual game results ==
An MVP/MOP award is presented each year to the most outstanding boy and girl players. The award is officially called the John R. Wooden Most Valuable Player Award.

=== Boys ===
East All-Stars (23 wins)	West All-Stars (22 wins)

Boys results
Year	Result	Host arena	Host city	Game MVP, High School	Attendance	TV Network	Commentators
1977	The inaugural 1977 team did not play in the current East versus West format (MVP: Gene Banks)					Games Not Televised	
1978	West 94, East 86	The Spectrum	Philadelphia, Pennsylvania	Rudy Woods, Bryan High School (TX)	13,063	Games Not Televised	
1979	East 106, West 105 (OT)	Charlotte Coliseum	Charlotte, North Carolina	Darren Daye, John F. Kennedy HS (CA)	11,666	Games Not Televised	
1980	West 135, East 111	Oakland Coliseum Arena	Oakland, California	Russell Cross, Manley HS (IL)	8,429	Games Not Televised	
1981	East 96, West 95	Levitt Arena	Wichita, Kansas	^{[a]}Adrian Branch, DeMatha HS (MD)^{[a]}Aubrey Sherrod, Wichita Heights HS (KS)	10,006	Games Not Televised	
1982	West 103, East 84	Rosemont Horizon	Rosemont, Illinois	Efrem Winters, King College Prep High School (IL)	15,836	Games Not Televised	
1983	West 115, East 113	Omni Coliseum	Atlanta, Georgia	^{[a]}Winston Bennett, Male HS (KY)^{[a]}Dwayne "Pearl" Washington, Boys and Girls High School (NY)	14,926	Games Not Televised	
1984	West 131, East 106	Pauley Pavilion	Los Angeles, California	John Williams, Crenshaw High School (CA)	10,214	Games Not Televised	
1985	East 128, West 98	Moody Coliseum	University Park, Texas	Walker Lambiotte, Central HS (VA)	9,007	ESPN	Jim Thacker; Dick Vitale
1986	East 104, West 101	Joe Louis Arena	Detroit, Michigan	J. R. Reid, Kempsville HS (VA)	15,527	ESPN	
1987	East 118, West 110	The Spectrum	Philadelphia, Pennsylvania	Mark Macon, Buena Vista THS (MI)	10,156	ABC	
1988	East 105, West 99	The Pit	Albuquerque, New Mexico	^{[a]}Alonzo Mourning, Indian River HS (VA)^{[a]}Billy Owens, Carlisle HS (PA)	12,815	ABC	Keith Jackson; Dick Vitale
1989	West 112, East 103	Kemper Arena	Kansas City, Missouri	^{[a]}Shaquille O'Neal, Robert G. Cole HS (TX)^{[a]}Bobby Hurley, St. Anthony HS (NJ)	9,419	ABC	Gary Bender; Dick Vitale
1990	East 115, West 104	Market Square Arena	Indianapolis, Indiana	^{[a]}Shawn Bradley, Emery County High School (UT)^{[a]}Khalid Reeves, Christ the King HS (NY)	12,033	ABC	Gary Bender; Dick Vitale
1991	West 108, East 106	Springfield Civic Center	Springfield, Massachusetts	^{[a]}Chris Webber, Detroit Country Day School (MI)^{[a]}Rick Brunson, Salem HS (MA)	8,246	CBS	Greg Gumbel; Billy Packer
1992	West 100, East 85	Alexander Memorial Coliseum	Atlanta, Georgia	Othella Harrington, Murrah HS (MS)	7,589	CBS	James Brown; Billy Packer
1993	East 105, West 95	Mid-South Coliseum	Memphis, Tennessee	^{[a]}Jacque Vaughn, John Muir HS (CA)^{[a]}Jerry Stackhouse, Oak Hill Academy (VA)	10,225	CBS	Greg Gumbel; Bill Raftery
1994	East 112, West 110	Nassau Veterans Memorial Coliseum	Uniondale, New York	Felipe López, Rice HS (NY)	6,008	CBS	Verne Lundquist; Bill Raftery
1995	West 125, East 115	Kiel Center	St. Louis, Missouri	Kevin Garnett, Farragut Academy HS (IL)	16,201	CBS	Verne Lundquist; Bill Raftery
1996	East 120, West 105	Civic Arena	Pittsburgh, Pennsylvania	Shaheen Holloway, St. Patrick HS (NJ)	13,411	CBS	Gus Johnson; Bill Raftery
1997	East 94, West 81	Clune Arena	Colorado Springs, Colorado	Kenny Gregory, Independence HS (OH)	5,858	CBS	Gus Johnson; Dan Bonner
1998	East 128, West 112	Norfolk Scope	Norfolk, Virginia	Ronald Curry, Hampton HS (VA)	10,253	ESPN	Dave Barnett, Bill Raftery, Jay Bilas
1999	West 141, East 128	Hilton Coliseum	Ames, Iowa	Jonathan Bender, Picayune Memorial HS (MS)	10,993	ESPN	Dave Barnett, Larry Conley, Jay Bilas
2000	West 146, East 120	FleetCenter	Boston, Massachusetts	Zach Randolph, Marion HS (IN)	18,624	ESPN	Dave Barnett; Tim McCormick
2001	West 131, East 125	Cameron Indoor Stadium	Durham, North Carolina	Eddy Curry, Thornwood HS (IL)	9,314	ESPN	Dave Sims
2002	East 138, West 107	Madison Square Garden	New York City, New York	JJ Redick, Cave Spring HS (VA)	16,505	ESPN	Dave Sims; Larry Conley
2003	East 122, West 107	Gund Arena	Cleveland, Ohio	LeBron James, St. Vincent-St. Mary HS (OH)	18,728	ESPN	Dan Shulman; Jay Bilas
2004	East 126, West 96	Ford Center	Oklahoma City, Oklahoma	^{[a]}Dwight Howard, Southwest Atlanta Christian Academy (GA)^{[a]}J. R. Smith, St. Benedict's Preparatory School (NJ)	14,402	ESPN	Dave Pasch, Doug Gottlieb, Tim McCormick
2005	East 115, West 110	Joyce Center	Notre Dame, Indiana	Josh McRoberts, Carmel (IN)	7,660	ESPN	
2006	West 112, East 94	Cox Arena	San Diego, California	^{[a]}Chase Budinger, La Costa Canyon HS (CA)^{[a]}Kevin Durant, Montrose Christian School (MD)	11,900	ESPN	Dave Pasch, Jay Williams, Tim McCormick
2007	West 114, East 112	Freedom Hall	Louisville, Kentucky	Michael Beasley, Notre Dame Prep (MA)	11,632	ESPN	Eric Collins, Len Elmore, Tim McCormick, Quint Kessenich
2008	East 107, West 102	Bradley Center	Milwaukee, Wisconsin	Tyreke Evans, American Christian Academy (PA)	10,914	ESPN	
2009	East 113, West 110	BankUnited Center	Coral Gables, Florida	Derrick Favors, South Atlanta HS (GA)	5,981	ESPN	
2010	West 107, East 104	Value City Arena	Columbus, Ohio	^{[a]}Harrison Barnes, Ames HS (IA)^{[a]}Jared Sullinger, Northland HS (OH)	9,210	ESPN	Bob Wischusen, Jay Williams, Quint Kessenich
2011	East 111, West 96	United Center	Chicago, Illinois	^{[a]}Michael Kidd-Gilchrist, St. Patrick HS (NJ)^{[a]}James Michael McAdoo, Norfolk Christian (VA)	19,909	ESPN	Bob Wischusen, Jay Williams, Stephen Bardo, Quint Kessenich
2012	West 106, East 102	United Center	Chicago, Illinois	Shabazz Muhammad, Bishop Gorman HS (NV)	16,308	ESPN	Bob Wischusen, Jay Williams, Stephen Bardo, Quint Kessenich
2013	West 110, East 99	United Center	Chicago, Illinois	Aaron Gordon, Archbishop Mitty HS (CA)	15,818	ESPN	Carter Blackburn, Jay Williams, Jalen Rose, Quint Kessenich
2014	West 105, East 102	United Center	Chicago, Illinois	^{[a]}Jahlil Okafor, Whitney Young (IL)^{[a]}Justin Jackson, Homeschool Christian Youth Association (TX)	17,116	ESPN	Carter Blackburn, Jay Williams, Jalen Rose, Quint Kessenich
2015	East 111, West 91	United Center	Chicago, Illinois	Cheick Diallo, Our Savior New American School (NY)		ESPN	Adam Amin, Jay Williams, Jalen Rose, Quint Kessenich
2016	West 114, East 107	United Center	Chicago, Illinois	^{[a]}Josh Jackson, Justin-Siena HS/Prolific Prep (CA)^{[a]}Frank Jackson, Lone Peak HS (UT)		ESPN	Adam Amin, Jay Williams, Jalen Rose, Quint Kessenich
2017	West 109, East 107	United Center	Chicago, Illinois	Michael Porter Jr., Nathan Hale HS/Father Tolton HS (MO)		ESPN	Adam Amin, Jay Williams, Jalen Rose, Quint Kessenich
2018	West 131, East 128	Philips Arena	Atlanta, Georgia	Nassir Little, Orlando Christian Prep (FL)		ESPN2	Mike Couzens, Jay Williams, Cory Alexander, Quint Kessenich
2019	East 115, West 100	State Farm Arena	Atlanta, Georgia	Cole Anthony, Oak Hill Academy (VA)		ESPN2	Mike Couzens, Jay Williams, Cory Alexander, Quint Kessenich
2020	Game Not Played	Toyota Center	Houston, Texas	Cancelled due to the COVID-19 pandemic			
2021	Game Not Played	—N/a	—N/a	Cancelled due to the COVID-19 pandemic			
2022	East 105, West 81	Wintrust Arena	Chicago, Illinois	Dariq Whitehead, Montverde Academy (FL)		ESPN	Ted Emrich, Cory Alexander, Paul Biancardi
2023	East 109, West 106	Toyota Center	Houston, Texas	^{[a]}D. J. Wagner, Camden High School^{[a]}Isaiah Collier, Wheeler High School		ESPN	Ted Emrich, Cory Alexander, Paul Biancardi
2024	East 88, West 86	Toyota Center	Houston, Texas	^{[a]}Dylan Harper, Don Bosco Prep^{[a]}Derik Queen, Montverde Academy		ESPN	Ted Emrich, Cory Alexander, Paul Biancardi
2025	West 105, East 92	Barclays Center	Brooklyn, New York	^{[a]}Darryn Peterson, Cuyahoga Valley Christian Academy^{[a]}Cameron Boozer, Christopher Columbus High School		ESPN	
2026	West 102, East 86	Desert Diamond Arena	Glendale, Arizona	^{[a]}Jason Crowe Jr., Inglewood High School^{[a]}Caleb Holt, Prolific Prep		ESPN	

^{a} Denotes All-Star Games in which joint winners were named

=== Girls ===
Girls MVP winners
Year	Host Arena	Host city	Player	High School	College
2002 (Note: Denotes All-Star Games in which more than one MVP was named.)	Madison Square Garden	New York City, New York	Ann Strother	Highlands Ranch HS (CO)	UConn
2002	Madison Square Garden	New York City, New York	Shanna Zolman	Wawasee High School (IN)	Tennessee
2003	Gund Arena	Cleveland, Ohio	Katie Gearlds	Beech Grove HS (IN)	Purdue
2004	Ford Center	Oklahoma City, Oklahoma	Alexis Hornbuckle	South Charleston HS (WV)	Tennessee
2005	Joyce Center	Notre Dame, Indiana	Courtney Paris	Piedmont HS (CA)	Oklahoma
2006	Cox Arena	San Diego, California	Jayne Appel	Carondelet HS (CA)	Stanford
2007	Freedom Hall	Louisville, Kentucky	Jasmine Thomas	Oakton HS (VA)	Duke
2008	Bradley Center	Milwaukee, Wisconsin	Brooklyn Pope	Paul Laurence Dunbar HS (TX)	Rutgers / Baylor
2009	BankUnited Center	Miami, Florida	Skylar Diggins	Washington HS (IN)	Notre Dame
2009	BankUnited Center	Miami, Florida	Tierra Ruffin-Pratt	T. C. Williams HS (VA)	North Carolina
2010	Value City Arena	Columbus, Ohio	Natasha Howard	Waite HS (OH)	Florida State
2010	Value City Arena	Columbus, Ohio	Meighan Simmons	Byron P. Steele II HS (TX)	Tennessee
2011	United Center	Chicago, Illinois	Elizabeth Williams	Princess Anne HS (VA)	Duke
2012	United Center	Chicago, Illinois	Alexis Prince	Edgewater HS (FL)	Baylor
2013	United Center	Chicago, Illinois	Mercedes Russell	Springfield HS (OR)	Tennessee
2014	United Center	Chicago, Illinois	Brianna Turner	Manvel High School (TX)	Notre Dame
2015	United Center	Chicago, Illinois	Marina Mabrey	Manasquan High School (NJ)	Notre Dame
2015	United Center	Chicago, Illinois	Te'a Cooper	McEachern High School (GA)	Tennessee
2016	United Center	Chicago, Illinois	Sabrina Ionescu	Miramonte High School (CA)	Oregon
2017	United Center	Chicago, Illinois	Rellah Boothe	IMG Academy (FL)	Texas
2018	Philips Arena	Atlanta, Georgia	Christyn Williams	Central Arkansas Christian High School (AR)	UConn
2019	State Farm Arena	Atlanta, Georgia	Jordan Horston	Columbus Africentric Early College (OH)	Tennessee
2020	Toyota Center	Houston, Texas	Cancelled due to the COVID-19 pandemic		
2021	—N/a	—N/a	Cancelled due to the COVID-19 pandemic		
2022	Wintrust Arena	Chicago, Illinois	Gabriela Jaquez	Adolfo Camarillo High School (CA)	UCLA
2022	Wintrust Arena	Chicago, Illinois	Kiki Rice	Sidwell Friends School (DC)	UCLA
2023	Toyota Center	Houston, TX	Hannah Hidalgo; JuJu Watkins	Paul VI High School; Sierra Canyon School	Notre Dame; USC
2024	Toyota Center	Houston, TX	Sarah Strong; Joyce Edwards	Grace Christian School; Camden High School	UConn; South Carolina
2025	Barclays Center	Brooklyn, New York	Sienna Betts	Grandview High School (CO)	UCLA
2026	Desert Diamond Arena	Glendale, Arizona	Saniyah Hall	SPIRE Institute (OH)	USC

== Morgan Wootten National Player of the Year ==
Prior to each game since 1997 (Boys)/2002 (Girls), a national player of the year has been chosen from the field of McDonald's All-Americans based on activity in the community, classroom and on the court. The award is named in honor of high school coach Morgan Wootten, one of the founders of the McDonald's game.

=== Past winners ===
Boys

- 1997: Shane Battier
- 1998: Ronald Curry
- 1999: Jonathan Bender
- 2000: Chris Duhon
- 2001: Aaron Miles
- 2002: Torin Francis
- 2003: LeBron James
- 2004: Dwight Howard
- 2005: Josh McRoberts
- 2006: Greg Oden
- 2007: Kevin Love
- 2008: Greg Monroe
- 2009: Derrick Favors
- 2010: Harrison Barnes
- 2011: Austin Rivers
- 2012: Shabazz Muhammad
- 2013: Jabari Parker
- 2014: Jahlil Okafor
- 2015: Ben Simmons
- 2016: Lonzo Ball
- 2017: Wendell Carter Jr.
- 2018: RJ Barrett
- 2019: James Wiseman
- 2020: Evan Mobley
- 2021: Chet Holmgren
- 2022: Dereck Lively II
- 2023: Isaiah Collier
- 2024: Dylan Harper
- 2025: Cameron Boozer
- 2026: Deron Rippey Jr.

Girls

- 2002: Nicole Wolff
- 2003: Ivory Latta
- 2004: Candace Parker
- 2005: Abby Waner
- 2006: Tina Charles
- 2007: Maya Moore
- 2008: Elena Delle Donne
- 2009: Kelsey Bone
- 2010: Chiney Ogwumike
- 2011: Elizabeth Williams
- 2012: Breanna Stewart
- 2013: Taya Reimer
- 2014: Ariel Atkins
- 2015: Katie Lou Samuelson
- 2016: Crystal Dangerfield
- 2017: Evina Westbrook
- 2018: Christyn Williams
- 2019: Haley Jones
- 2020: Paige Bueckers
- 2021: Azzi Fudd
- 2022: Kiki Rice
- 2023: Mikaylah Williams
- 2024: Joyce Edwards
- 2025: Sienna Betts
- 2026: Kate Harpring

== Sprite/Powerade Jam Fest Award Winners ==
The slam dunk contest was first held as an unofficial event in 1985, and became an official part of the festivities in 1987.

The three-point contest was first held for boys in 1989, with a girls' competition added alongside the inaugural girls' game in 2002.

The skills contest was added for both boys and girls in 2002, with separate events held for both sexes through 2015.

In 2016, the skills contest was discontinued and replaced with a "Legends & Stars Shootout", involving teams consisting of one boy, one girl, and one All-American Game alumnus of either sex. Within each individual entry of Legends & Stars Shootout winners, the teams are listed in the aforementioned order. The Shootout is a timed competition in which each team must make a layup, free throw, three-pointer, and halfcourt shot in that order.

Year	Dunk Contest	3-Point Contest	Skills Contest	Legends & Stars Shootout
1985	Michael Porter			
1987	Jerome Harmon			
1988	Matt Steigenga			
1989	James Robinson	Pat Graham		
1990	Darrin Hancock	Adrian Autry		
1991	Jimmy King	Sharone Wright		
1992	Carlos Strong	Chris Collins		
1993	Jerry Stackhouse	Chris Kingsbury		
1994	Ricky Price	Trajan Langdon		
1995	Vince Carter	Louis Bullock		
1996	Lester Earl	Nate James		
1997	Baron Davis	Shane Battier		
1998	Ronald Curry	Teddy Dupay		
1999	Donnell Harvey	Jason Kapono		
2000	DeShawn Stevenson	Chris Duhon		
2001	David Lee	Mo Williams		
2002	Carmelo Anthony	JJ Redick (boys); Shanna Zolman (girls)	Torin Francis (boys); Courtney LaVere (girls)	
2003	LeBron James	Mike Jones (boys); Ivory Latta (girls)	Brian Butch (boys); Erin Lawless (girls)	
2004	Candace Parker	Darius Washington Jr. (boys); Sa'de Wiley-Gatewood (girls)	LaMarcus Aldridge (boys); Charde Houston (girls)	
2005	Gerald Green	Mario Chalmers (boys); Erika Arriaran (girls)	Richard Hendrix (boys); Christina Wirth (girls)	
2006	Gerald Henderson, Jr.	Wayne Ellington (boys); Allison Hightower (girls)	James Keefe (boys); Michelle Harrison (girls)	
2007	Blake Griffin	Chris Wright (boys); Italee Lucas (girls)	Nolan Smith (boys); Cetera DeGraffenreid (girls)	
2008	DeMar DeRozan	Larry Drew II (boys); Ashley Corral (girls)	Jrue Holiday (boys); Nneka Ogwumike (girls)	
2009	Avery Bradley	Ryan Kelly (boys); Skylar Diggins (girls)	Dante Taylor (boys); China Crosby (girls)	
2010	Josh Selby	Cory Joseph (boys); Maggie Lucas (girls)	Keith Appling (boys); Chelsea Gray (girls)	
2011	Le'Bryan Nash	Kyle Wiltjer (boys); Kaleena Mosqueda-Lewis (girls)	Michael Carter-Williams (boys); Ariya Crook-Williams (girls)	
2012	Shabazz Muhammad	Rasheed Sulaimon (boys); Morgan Tuck (girls)	Tyler Lewis (boys); Jordan Jones (girls)	
2013	Chris Walker	Nigel Williams-Goss (boys); Kaela Davis (girls)	Demetrius Jackson (boys); Jessica Washington (girls)	
2014	Grayson Allen	James Blackmon Jr. (boys); Alexa Middleton (girls)	Tyus Jones (boys); Alexa Middleton (girls)	
2015	Dwayne Bacon	Luke Kennard (boys); Asia Durr (girls)	Jalen Brunson (boys); Napheesa Collier (girls)	
2016	Frank Jackson	Malik Monk (boys); Amber Ramirez (girls)		Jayson Tatum, Amber Ramirez, Candice Wiggins
2017	Collin Sexton	Trae Young (boys); Chasity Patterson (girls)		Quade Green, Anastasia Hayes, Jayne Appel
2018	Zion Williamson	Immanuel Quickley & Cam Reddish (boys); McKenzie Forbes (girls)		Romeo Langford, Christyn Williams, Candice Wiggins
2019	Francesca Belibi	Cole Anthony (boys); Samantha Brunelle (girls)		Tyrese Maxey, Samantha Brunelle, Diamond DeShields
2020	Cancelled due to the COVID-19 pandemic			
2021	Cancelled due to the COVID-19 pandemic			
2022	Ashlyn Watkins	Keyonte George (boys); Ashlon Jackson (girls)	Mark Mitchell (boys); Indya Nivar (girls)	
2023	Sean Stewart	Jared McCain (boys); Kymora Johnson (girls)	Ja'Kobe Walter (boys); Riley Nelson (girls)	
2024				
2026				

Note: The only female winners of the slam dunk contest are Candace Parker, Fran Belibi, and Ashlyn Watkins who respectively won in 2004, 2019, and 2022.

== See also ==
- All-American Bowl (high school football)
