= Kenny Fields =

American basketball player (born 1962)

Personal information
- Born: February 9, 1962 (age 64) Iowa City, Iowa, U.S.
- Listed height: 6 ft 5 in (1.96 m)
- Listed weight: 220 lb (100 kg)

Career information
- High school: Verbum Dei (Los Angeles, California)
- College: UCLA (1980–1984)
- NBA draft: 1984: 1st round, 21st overall pick
- Drafted by: Milwaukee Bucks
- Playing career: 1984–2000
- Position: Small forward / shooting guard
- Number: 7, 54

Career history
- 1984–1986: Milwaukee Bucks
- 1986–1987: Los Angeles Clippers
- 1987–1988: Rochester Flyers
- 1988: Los Angeles Clippers
- 1988: Great Taste Milkmasters
- 1988: Jersey Shore Bucs
- 1989–1990: Tulsa Fast Breakers
- 1990: Grand Rapids Hoops
- 1999–2000: U.D. Oliveirense

Career highlights
- Third team All-American – AP (1983); Pac-10 Player of the Year (1983); 3× First-team All-Pac-10 (1982–1984); Second-team Parade All-American (1980); McDonald's All-American (1980)

Career NBA statistics
- Points: 1,140 (6.2 ppg)
- Rebounds: 464 (2.5 rpg)
- Assists: 188 (1.0 apg)
- Stats at NBA.com
- Stats at Basketball Reference

Kenneth Henry Fields (born February 9, 1962) is an American former professional basketball player who was selected by the Milwaukee Bucks in the first round (21st pick overall) of the 1984 NBA draft. A 6'5" guard-forward from UCLA, Fields played in 4 seasons in the NBA from 1984 to 1988. He played for the Bucks and Los Angeles Clippers. His best year as a pro came during the 1986–87 season when he split time with the Bucks and Clippers, appearing in 48 games and averaging 8.2 ppg. Fields also played parts of two seasons in the Continental Basketball Association with three teams.

== NBA career statistics ==
Legend
GP	Games played	GS	Games started	MPG	Minutes per game
FG%	Field goal percentage	3P%	3-point field goal percentage	FT%	Free throw percentage
RPG	Rebounds per game	APG	Assists per game	SPG	Steals per game
BPG	Blocks per game	PPG	Points per game	**Bold**	Career high

=== Regular season ===
Year	Team	GP	GS	MPG	FG%	3P%	FT%	RPG	APG	SPG	BPG	PPG
1984–85	Milwaukee	51	1	10.5	.440	.000	.750	1.6	0.7	0.2	0.2	3.8
1985–86	Milwaukee	**78**	3	14.4	.513	.000	.689	2.6	1.0	**0.7**	0.2	6.4
1986–87	Milwaukee	4	0	5.5	**.750**	.000	.200	0.5	0.3	0.3	0.0	3.3
1986–87	Los Angeles	44	**17**	19.6	.445	**.250**	**.809**	3.3	**1.4**	**0.7**	**0.3**	**8.7**
1987–88	Los Angeles	7	0	**22.0**	.444	.000	.769	**4.1**	**1.4**	**0.7**	**0.3**	7.4
Career		184	21	14.6	.474	.188	.733	2.5	1.0	0.5	0.2	6.2

=== Playoffs ===
Year	Team	GP	GS	MPG	FG%	3P%	FT%	RPG	APG	SPG	BPG	PPG
1985–86	Milwaukee	12	4	13.2	.551	.333	.522	2.3	0.8	0.7	0.0	7.4
