= Russell Cross =

American basketball player (born 1961)

Personal information
- Born: September 5, 1961 (age 65) Chicago, Illinois, U.S.
- Listed height: 6 ft 10 in (2.08 m)
- Listed weight: 215 lb (98 kg)

Career information
- High school: Manley (Chicago, Illinois)
- College: Purdue (1980–1983)
- NBA draft: 1983: 1st round, 6th overall pick
- Drafted by: Golden State Warriors
- Playing career: 1983–1990
- Position: Center
- Number: 40

Career history
- 1983–1984: Golden State Warriors
- 1985–1986: Louisville / LaCrosse Catbirds
- 1986–1987: Alfasprint Napoli
- 1989: Granollers
- 1989-90: Cirsa L'Hospitalet
- 1990: Breogán

Career highlights
- McDonald's All-American MVP (1980); First-team Parade All-American (1980)
- Stats at NBA.com
- Stats at Basketball Reference

Russell Cross (born September 5, 1961) is an American former professional basketball player who was selected by the National Basketball Association's Golden State Warriors in the first round (6th pick overall) of the 1983 NBA draft.

== College career ==
Russell Cross attended and played basketball at Manley High School, located on the West Side of Chicago. He led Carver to an Illinois state title; he was selected to the McDonald's All-American team and was also a first-team Parade All-American; he was also the Parade Player of the Year. The 6'10" center moved on to attend Purdue University, where he played his freshman season under first year head coach, Gene Keady. In his first season as a Boilermaker, he set a freshman record with 540 points on the season and led Purdue to an NIT third-place finish and to a 21–11 record. In his sophomore season, Cross helped lead them to the NIT Finals with All-Big Ten teammate, Keith Edmonson. In his junior season, he led Purdue to a 21–9 record and onto a Second Round NCAA Tournament appearance. Russell was named First Team All-Big Ten his junior year.

== Professional career ==
Russell Cross skipped his senior year at Purdue to enter the 1983 NBA draft, where he was selected as the 6th pick in the first round by the Golden State Warriors. Cross played in only one NBA season, averaging 3.7 points in 45 games for the Warriors in the 1983–84 NBA season. Cross then signed a contract with the Denver Nuggets, but did not appear in a game and was waived late in the 1984–85 season. He spent the remainder of the 1984–85 season and the 1985–86 season with the Louisville Catbirds and then moved to Europe, where he spent the next seven seasons in the Italian and Spanish Leagues.

== Career statistics ==
Legend
GP	Games played	GS	Games started	MPG	Minutes per game
FG%	Field goal percentage	3P%	3-point field goal percentage	FT%	Free throw percentage
RPG	Rebounds per game	APG	Assists per game	SPG	Steals per game
BPG	Blocks per game	PPG	Points per game	**Bold**	Career high

=== NBA ===
==== Regular season ====
Year	Team	GP	GS	MPG	FG%	3P%	FT%	RPG	APG	SPG	BPG	PPG
1983–84	Golden State	45	0	7.9	.571	—	.418	1.8	0.5	0.3	0.2	3.7
