= Shenandoah County Public Schools =

School district in Virginia, United States

- 600 N Main St., Suite #200; Woodstock, Shenandoah County; Virginia, 22664-1855

District information
- Grades: K–12
- Established: April 8, 1871; 154 years ago
- Superintendent: Dr. Melody Sheppard
- Schools: 10
- Budget: $74,403,000 (2023)
- NCES District ID: 5103510
- District ID: VA-085

Students and staff
- Students: 5,693 (2023)
- Teachers: 443 (2023)
- Staff: 559 (2023)

Other information
- Website: shenandoah.k12.va.us

Shenandoah County Public Schools is the operating public school system within Shenandoah County, Virginia. It is governed by a Board of Education. The district operates 10 school sites, including 3 elementary schools, 3 middle schools, 3 high schools, and a career and technical education center. Dr. Melody Sheppard serves as the superintendent. Administrative offices are located in Woodstock.

As of 2023, the school district has an enrollment of 5,693 students.

== History ==
In September 1870, Capt. John H. Grabill was appointed as the first superintendent of schools for Shenandoah County under the provisions for the new public school system in Virginia. The first meeting of the Board of Education was held on April 8, 1871. In the early years of the district, it had over 114 schools, the majority of which were county one-room schools.

The Virginia Teachers League (now represented by the Virginia Education Association) was originally established in Mount Jackson in Shenandoah County in 1898.

== Schools ==
=== High schools ===
- Central High School
- Stonewall Jackson High School (formerly Mountain View High School, 2020–2024)
- Strasburg High School

=== Middle schools ===
- North Fork Middle School
- Peter Muhlenberg Middle School
- Signal Knob Middle School

=== Elementary schools ===
- Ashby Lee Elementary School (formerly Honey Run Elementary School, 2020–2024)
- Sandy Hook Elementary School
- W.W. Robinson Elementary School

=== Other ===
- Massanutten Regional Governor's School for Environmental Science and Technology
- Triplett Business and Technical Institute
