= Walker Lambiotte =

American former basketball player

Personal information
- Born: February 27, 1967 (age 59)
- Listed height: 6 ft 7 in (2.01 m)

Career information
- High school: Central (Woodstock, Virginia)
- College: NC State (1985–1987); Northwestern (1988–1990)
- NBA draft: 1990: undrafted
- Position: Small forward / shooting guard

Career highlights
- Second-team Parade All-American (1985); McDonald's All-American MVP (1985)

Walker Riley Lambiotte (born February 27, 1967) is an American former basketball player. While playing for Central High School in Woodstock, Virginia, he was named a Parade All-American and MVP of the 1985 McDonald's All-American Boys Game after scoring 24 points. Walker played college basketball for North Carolina State for head coach Jim Valvano before he transferred to Northwestern.

Lambiotte was not selected in the 1990 NBA draft, and then played three years professionally in Japan.
