= Amber Ramirez =

American basketball player (born 1998)

No. 23 – Arkansas
- Position: Point guard
- League: NCAA

Personal information
- Born: February 24, 1998 (age 28) San Antonio, Texas
- Listed height: 5 ft 9 in (1.75 m)

Career information
- High school: Wagner (San Antonio, Texas)
- College: TCU (2016–2018); Arkansas (2019–present)

Career highlights
- McDonald's All-American (2016)
Medals
Representing the USA
FIBA Under-18 Americas Championship
Gold medal – first place	2016 Chile	Team
3x3
Silver medal – second place	2016 Kazakhstan	Team competition

Amber Ramirez (born February 24, 1998) is an American basketball player with the Arkansas Razorbacks women's basketball team. She played her freshman and sophomore season with TCU In 2016 and 2017, then transferred to Arkansas. She sat out the 2018–19 season due to transfer rules, then played for Arkansas during her junior and senior years. Due to Covid rules, all active players were granted an additional year of eligibility, so she is playing in the 2021–22 season as a redshirt senior.

== High school ==
Ramirez attended Karen Wagner High School in San Antonio, Texas, where she played basketball. In her junior year, she was selected to be a member of the 2015 Express-News All-Area basketball team and was named the player of the year. She helped lead the team to the state tournament appearance for the second year in a row, scoring 26.9 points per game, and hitting over 40% of her three-point attempts. During the state tournament, she hit eight three-pointers in one game to set the state tournament record. ESPN graded her as a five star recruit, their highest ranking. She initially decided to attend Oklahoma State, but then decided to reopen her recruitment and ended up signing with TCU. Ramirez was selected to play in the McDonald's All-American Game in 2016. She also participated in the three-point shootout, winning the contest. She was also included in the Legends and Stars Shootout, paired with Candice Wiggins and Jayson Tatum who would go on to play for the Boston Celtics. Ramirez hit a half-court shot which resulted in a win for her team. Ramirez ended her high school career with 2,769 points, the second highest point total in the city of San Antonio history.

== USA Basketball ==
=== 2016 3x3 U18 Astana, Kazakhstan ===
Ramirez was selected for the under 18 3x3 basketball team which played in the world championships in Astana, Kazakhstan. She helped the team win the silver metal in the tournament.

=== 2016 U18 Valdivia, Chile ===
A month after competing in the 3x3 tournament in Kazakhstan, Ramirez was selected to be a member of the USA under 18 team to compete in the Americas championship for women in 2016. Ramirez started all five games, averaging 10.8 points per game third-best on the team and help the USA when all five games in the gold medal at the tournament in Valdivia, Chile.

== College career ==
=== 2016–17 TCU ===
As a freshman, Ramirez played in 23 of the team's 30 games, missing seven due to a midseason injury. She averaged 8.3 points per game good enough for third place among all conference freshmen. In her game against Butler she scored 19 points, hitting five of eight three-pointers which earned her the Big 12 Freshman of the Week award. She hit 85% of her free throws for the season.

=== 2017–18 TCU ===
As a sophomore, Ramirez played in all 36 games, starting 23 of them. She averaged 10.4 points per game. In the game against southeastern Louisiana she made 11 of her three-point attempts setting a single-game record for both TCU and the Big 12. She helped her team earn an invitation to the 2018 Women's National Invitation Tournament, where they won their first four games, and lost to the eventual champion, Indiana in the semi-finals.

=== 2018–19 Arkansas ===
Ramirez transferred to Arkansas, but sat out the season due to NCAA transfer rules. 8

=== 2019–20 Arkansas ===
In her junior year, she averaged 14.7 points per game, hitting 44.7% of her three-point attempts. This set the single-season record for the Arkansas program. She had 106 three-pointers over the course of the season which placed her second in the NCAA for the season, and set a single-season record for Arkansas. She recorded her 1000th career point in the SEC tournament.

=== 2020–21 Arkansas ===
Ramirez had one of her best career performances on senior day against Alabama, scoring 35 points for a career-high. She hit eight three-pointers helping the team to record 19 threes which is a single-game SEC record. This was a challenging season due to Covid causing cancellation of many games. For example, UConn's originally scheduled games against Louisville, Baylor and Providence, all of which were canceled. UConn wanted to add a game, an unusual occurrence during most seasons. Arkansas had also lost a game due to Vanderbilt's decision to end their season, so the two teams decided to meet on January 28, 2021. UConn was undefeated and ranked number three in the AP poll while Arkansas was 11–5 and ranked number 19 on the day of the game. Arkansas beat UConn 90–87, with Ramirez scoring 22 points.

=== TCU and Arkansas statistics ===
Ratios
Year	Team	GP	FG%	3P%	FT%	RBG	APG	BPG	SPG	PPG
2016–17	TCU	23	34.2%	36.8%	85.0%	2.00	1.39	0.48	0.65	8.26
2017–18	TCU	36	42.1%	39.2%	85.7%	1.89	2.89	0.11	0.83	10.42
2018–19	Arkansas	Redshirt per NCAA rules								
2019–20	Arkansas	32	44.2%	44.7%	92.3%	3.16	1.88	0.31	1.13	14.69
2020–21	Arkansas	27	43.0%	43.5%	80.8%	2.89	1.52	0.19	1.11	13.52
Career		118	41.7%	41.8%	85.6%	2.48	2.01	0.25	0.94	11.86

Totals
Year	Team	GP	FG	FGA	3P	3PA	FT	FTA	REB	A	BK	ST	PTS
2016–17	TCU	23	67	196	39	106	17	20	46	32	11	15	190
2017–18	TCU	36	131	311	65	166	48	56	68	104	4	30	375
2018–19	Arkansas	Redshirt per NCAA rules											
2019–20	Arkansas	32	164	371	106	237	36	39	101	60	10	36	470
2020–21	Arkansas	27	123	286	77	177	42	52	78	41	5	30	365
Career		118	485	1164	287	686	143	167	293	237	30	111	1400
