= Sergi Martínez =

Spanish basketball player (born 1999)

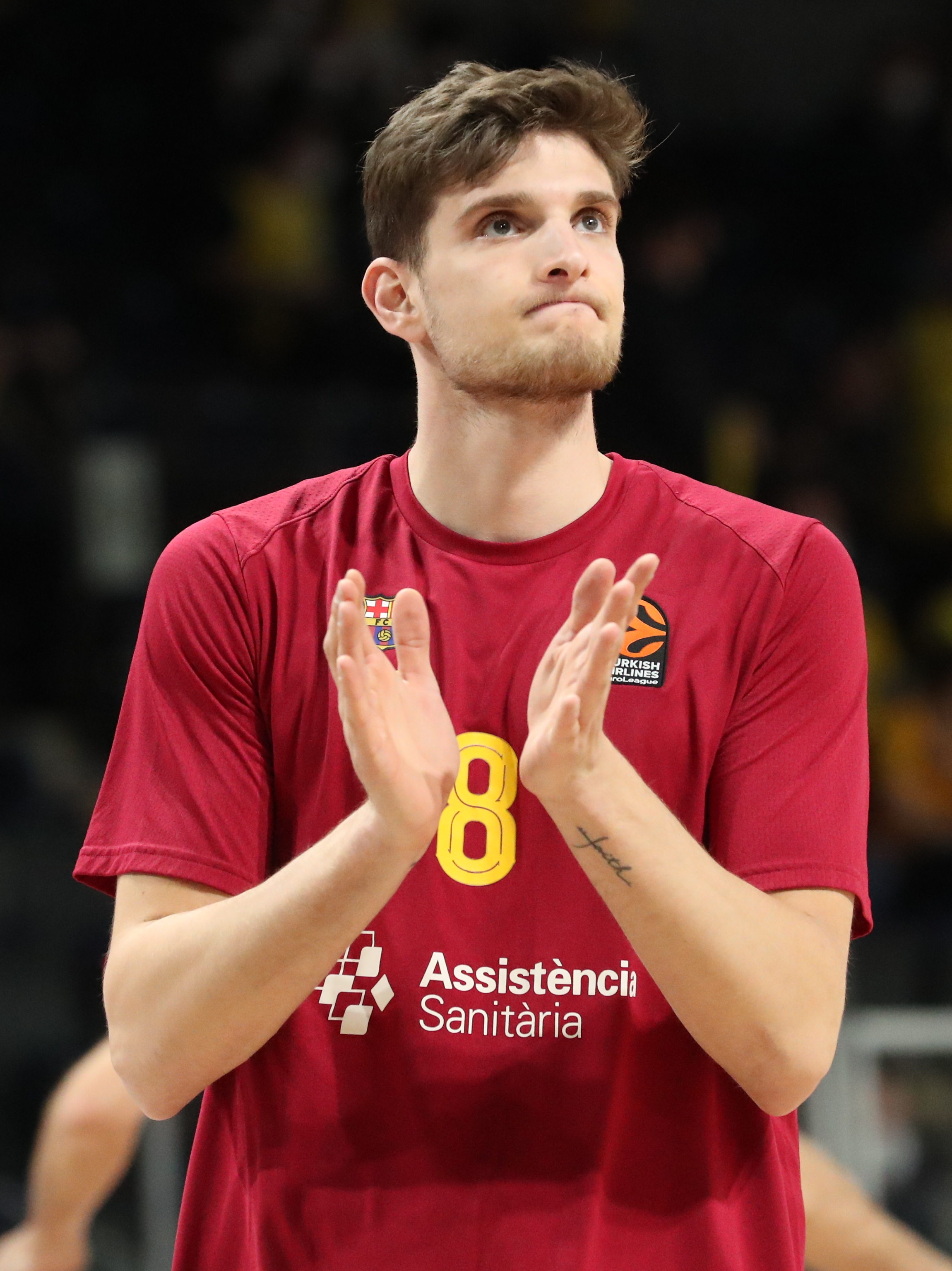
- Martínez with Barcelona in 2022

No. 23 – Bàsquet Girona
- Position: Small forward
- League: Liga ACB

Personal information
- Born: 10 May 1999 (age 26) Rubí, Spain
- Listed height: 2.02 m (6 ft 8 in)
- Listed weight: 90 kg (198 lb)

Career information
- Playing career: 2019–present

Career history
- 2019–2024: FC Barcelona
- 2019–2021: →FC Barcelona B
- 2023–2024: →Bàsquet Girona
- 2024–present: Bàsquet Girona

Career highlights
- 2× Liga ACB champion (2021, 2023); 2× Spanish Cup champion (2021, 2022)
Medals
Men's basketball
Representing Spain
U20 European Championship
Silver medal – second place	2019 Israel	U20 Team
U18 European Championship
Silver medal – second place	2017 Slovakia	U18 Team
U16 European Championship
Bronze medal – third place	2014 Latvia	U16 Team

Sergi Martínez Costa (born 10 May 1999), is a Spanish professional basketball player for Bàsquet Girona of the Spanish Liga ACB. He has also represented the Spanish national team. Standing at 6 ft 8 in (2.02 m), Martínez plays in the small forward position.

== Early life and youth career ==
Growing up in Rubí, Catalonia, Martínez started playing basketball for local club CEB Sant Jordi before joining the youth ranks of FC Barcelona at 9 years old. He would make his way through all the junior categories until reaching the reserve team, FC Barcelona B, in 2015, playing in the LEB Oro.

== Professional career ==
=== FC Barcelona (2019–2024) ===
In October 2019, Martínez made his professional debut with the FC Barcelona first team in a Liga ACB game against CB Gran Canaria, during the 2019–20 season. Still a reserve team player, Martínez played in the LEB Plata during the season. In October 2020, Martínez made his EuroLeague debut. He started being a usual in the first team roster during the 2020–21 season and officially joined the FC Barcelona roster in the 2021–22 season. He would extend his contract with Barcelona in July 2023, reaching an agreement to play the next season on loan with Bàsquet Girona.

He would join Bàsquet Girona on loan in July 2023, playing in the 2023–24 ACB with the Fontajau-based team. In June 2024, FC Barcelona decided not to activate a one year option on Martínez's contract, effectively ending the player's spell at Barcelona. With Barcelona, Martínez won 2 Liga ACB trophies (2021, 2023) and 2 Spanish Cups (2021, 2022).

=== Bàsquet Girona (2024–present) ===
Martínez was officially announced as a Bàsquet Girona player on June 27, 2024, having played the previous season with the Catalans on loan. He averaged 4.3 points per game and 4.7 rebounds in 28 games during the 2024–25 ACB season, helping Girona secure a spot in the 2025–26 ACB.

At the start of the 2025–26 season, he was named team captain for Girona. On April 28, 2026 he signed a contract extension linking him to Girona until 2028.

== National team career ==
Busquets has played in several international tournaments with the youth ranks of the Spanish national team, playing the U18 European Championship in 2017 and the U20 European Championship in 2019.

He made his debut the senior Spanish national team on July 3, 2021, in a friendly game against Iran.

== Awards and accomplishments ==
=== Spanish junior national team ===
- 2014 U16 European Championship: Bronze
- 2017 U18 European Championship: Silver
- 2019 U20 European Championship: Silver
