= Berke Atar =

Turkish basketball player (born 1999)

Ragıp Berke Atar
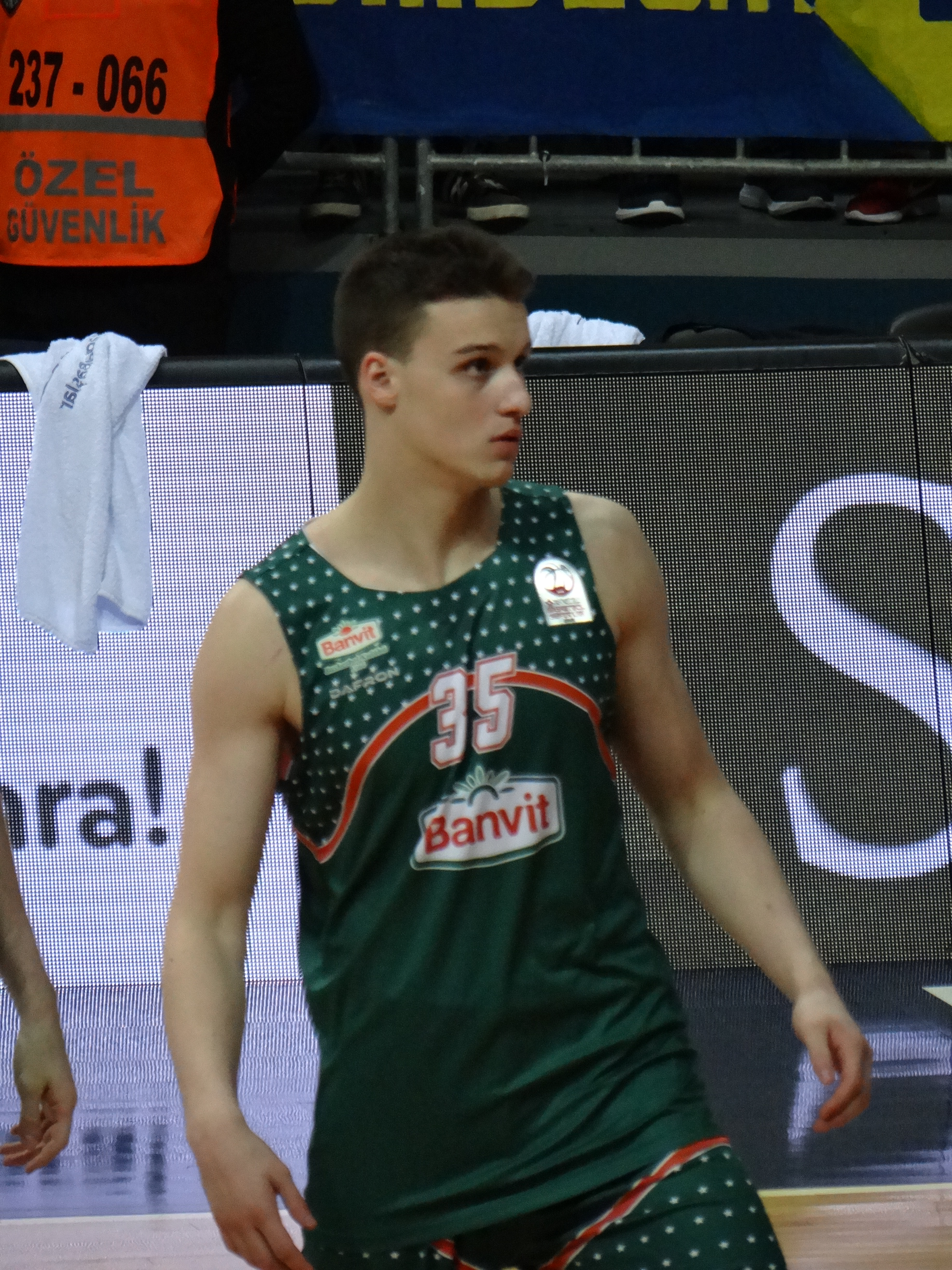
- Atar with Banvit in 2019

Free Agent
- Position: Center

Personal information
- Born: 13 July 1999 (age 27) Konak, Turkey
- Listed height: 6 ft 11 in (2.11 m)
- Listed weight: 231 lb (105 kg)

Career information
- NBA draft: 2021: undrafted
- Playing career: 2015–present

Career history
- 2015–2018: Bandırma Kırmızı
- 2018–2019: Teksüt Bandırma
- 2020: MZT Skopje
- 2020–2021: Galatasaray
- 2021–2023: Darüşşafaka
- 2023: Manisa Büyükşehir Belediyespor
- 2023–2024: Merkezefendi Bld. Denizli Basket
- 2024–2025: Ankaragücü
- 2025–2026: Gaziantep Basketbol

Ragıp Berke Atar (born 13 July 1999) is a Turkish professional basketball player who last played for Gaziantep of the Türkiye Basketbol Ligi (TBL). Standing at 2.11 m (6 ft 11 in), he plays as a center.

== Professional career ==
On 27 January 2019, Atar signed with Macedonian basketball team MZT Skopje.

On 3 July 2020, he signed with Galatasaray of the Basketbol Süper Ligi.

On 24 June 2021, he has signed with Darüşşafaka of the Turkish Basketball Super League.

On 1 April 2023, he signed with Manisa Büyükşehir Belediyespor of the Turkish Basketbol Süper Ligi.

On October 31, 2023, he signed with Merkezefendi Bld. Denizli Basket of the Basketbol Süper Ligi (BSL).

On August 30, 2024, he signed with CBet Jonava of the Lithuanian Basketball League (LKL).

On August 3, 2025, he signed with Gaziantep of the Türkiye Basketbol Ligi (TBL).
