= Utebo =

Town in Zaragoza, Spain

- Town
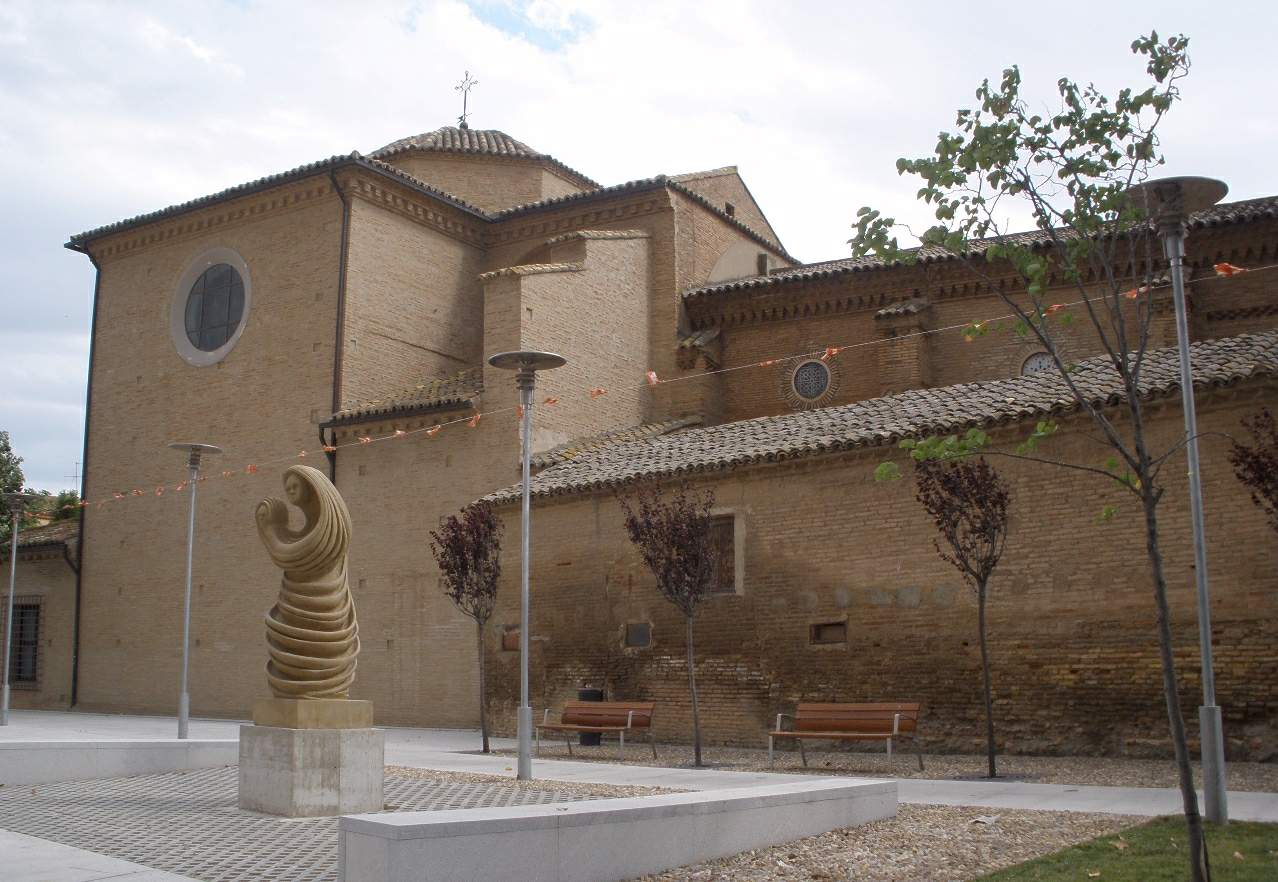

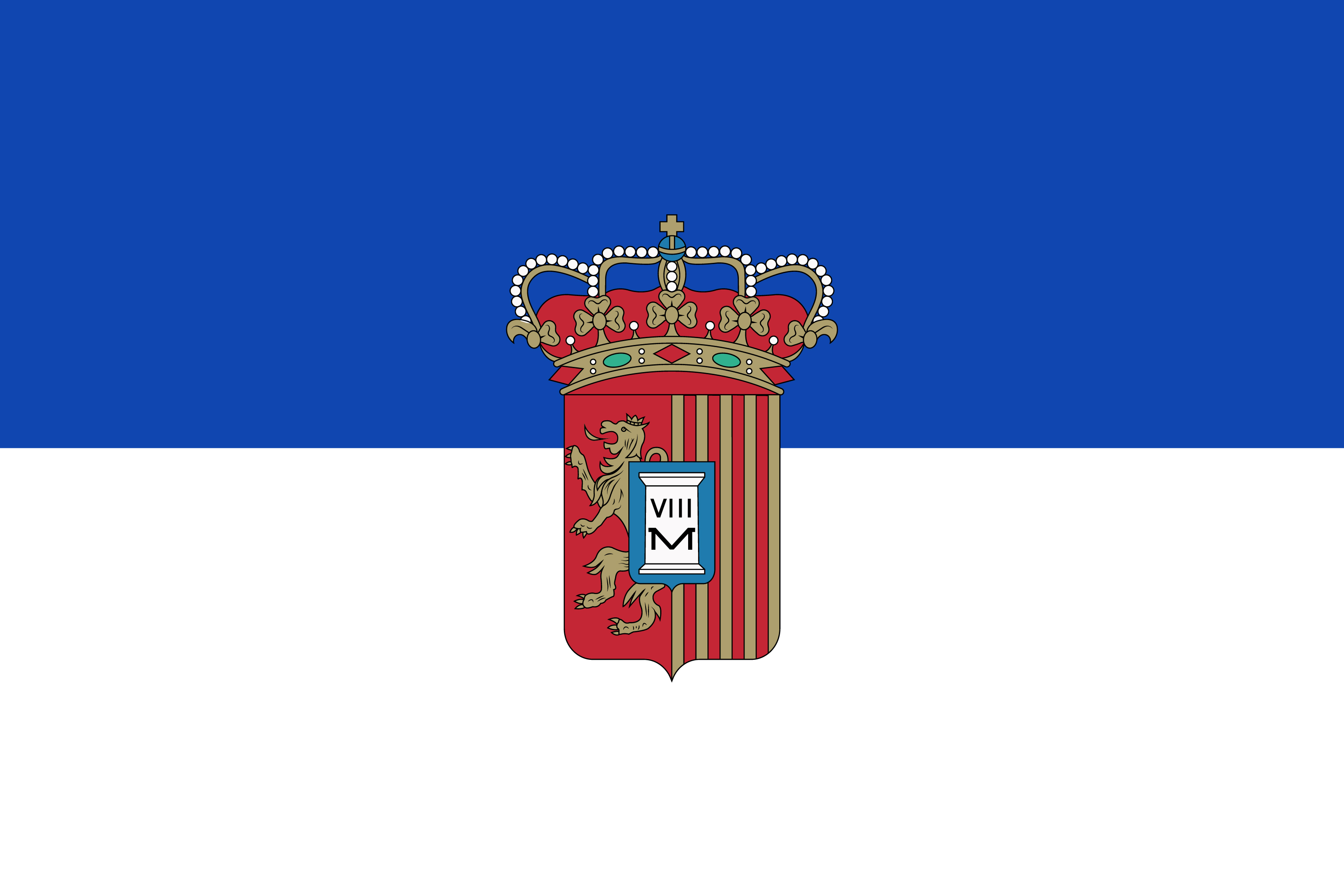
- Flag Coat of arms
- Interactive map of Utebo
- Coordinates: 41°43′N 1°00′W
- Country: Spain
- Autonomous community: Aragon
- Province: Zaragoza
- Municipality: Utebo

Government
  - Mayor: Gema Gutiérrez

Area
  - Total: 17.9 km^{2} (6.9 sq mi)
- Elevation: 207 m (679 ft)

Population (2025-01-01)
  - Total: 19,116
  - Density: 1,070/km^{2} (2,770/sq mi)
- Time zone: UTC+1 (CET)
  - Summer (DST): UTC+2 (CEST)
- ZIP Code: 50180
- Website: http://www.ayto-utebo.es/

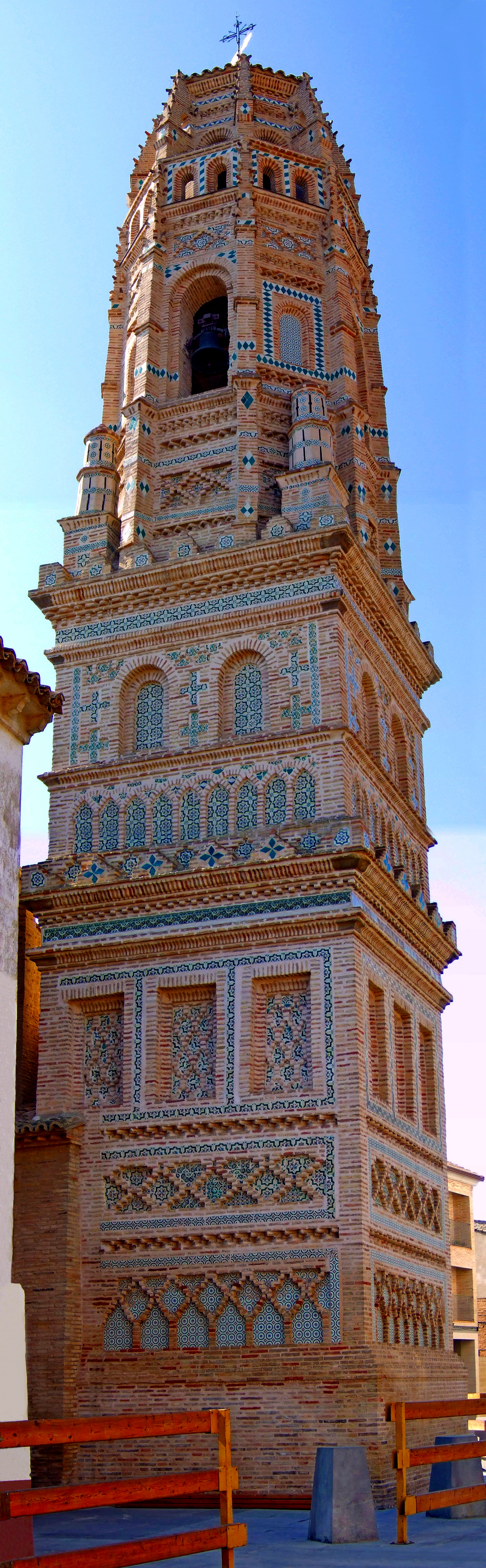
Church of Our Lady of the Assumption, Utebo

Utebo (Aragonese: Utevo) is a town located in the province of Zaragoza, Aragon, Spain. At the time of the 2011 census (INE), the municipality had a population of 18,602 inhabitants and was the third most populous town in the province, only surpassed by Zaragoza and Calatayud.

== Demography ==
In 2012 Utebo had a population of 18,281 inhabitants. In 1900 it had 1,799 inhabitants.

== Twin towns ==
Utebo is twinned with:

- Plaisance-du-Touch, France

== Notable people ==
- J. J. Arcega-Whiteside (born 1996), American football wide receiver

== See also ==
- List of municipalities in Zaragoza
