= Tom Fullarton =

Australian rules footballer and basketball player

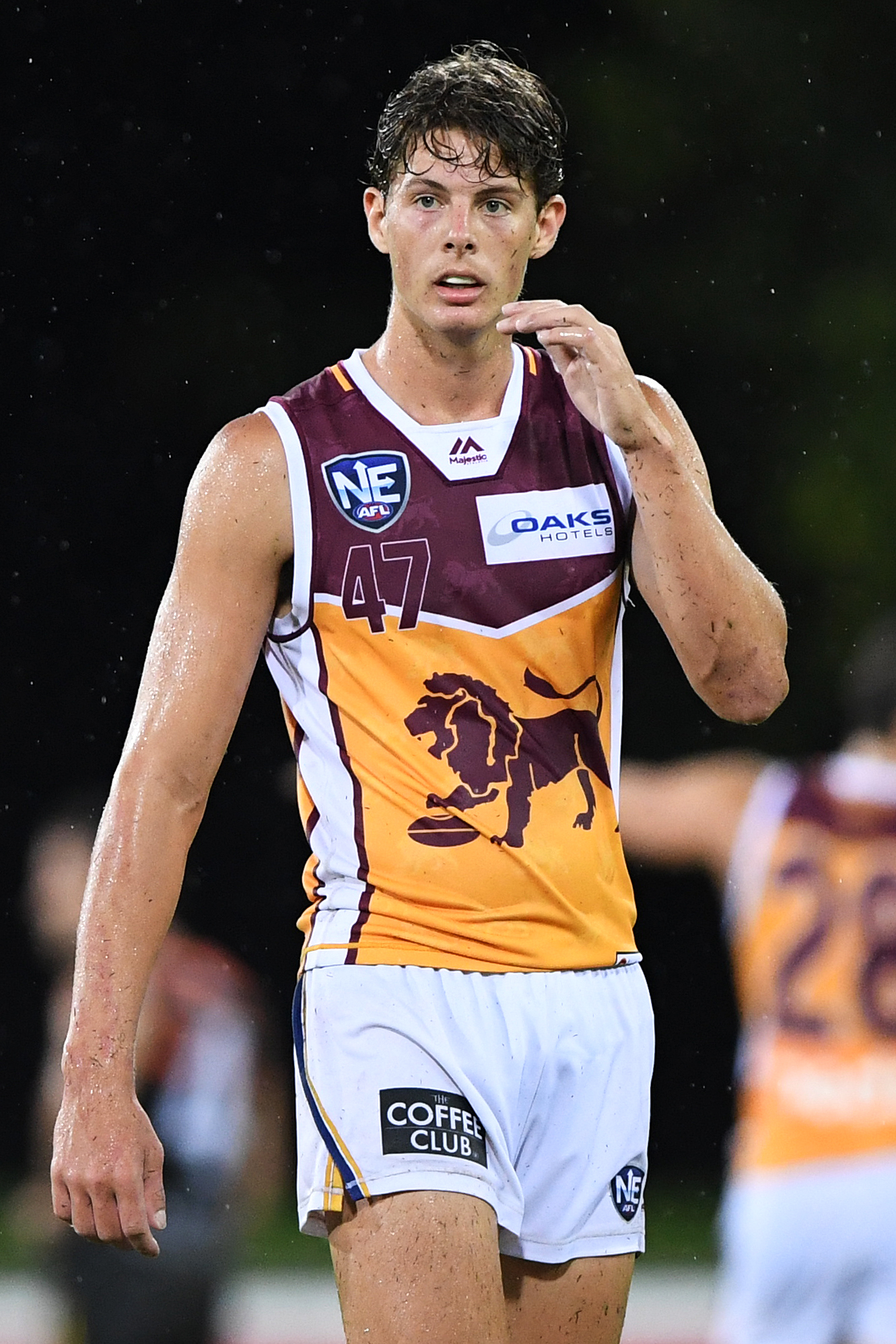
- Fullarton in April 2019
- Born: 23 February 1999 (age 27); Sunshine Coast, Queensland, Australia
- Height: 200 cm (6 ft 7 in)
- Basketball career

Career information
- Playing career: 2016–2018
- Number: 15

Career history
- 2016–2018: Brisbane Bullets
Australian rules football career
Personal information
- Debut: 23 August 2020, Brisbane Lions vs. St Kilda, at The Gabba
- Height: 198 cm (6 ft 6 in)
- Weight: 92 kg (203 lb)
- Position: Ruck
Playing career
Years	Club	Games (Goals)
2019–2023	Brisbane Lions	19 (6)
2024–2025	Melbourne	2 (0)
Total		21 (6)

Tom Adrian Fullarton (born 23 February 1999) is a former professional Australian rules footballer and basketball player who played for the Brisbane Lions and Melbourne in the Australian Football League (AFL), and the Brisbane Bullets in the National Basketball League (NBL).

== Basketball career ==
=== 2016 FIBA U-17 World Cup (Australia) ===
Fullarton was named captain of the Australian 2016 under 17 world cup squad. The team couldn't make it past the quarter-finals going down 74–63 to host nation Spain. The Australian national team coach, Andrej Lemanis stated he was "Boomers material".

=== Brisbane Bullets (2016–2018) ===
Fullarton was signed as a development player for the Brisbane Bullets, who were coached by Lemanis, in 2016 for their 2016–17 season when the Bullets rejoined the league after previously losing their licence in 2008. On 21 January 2017, the team released Jermaine Beal from the roster and signed Fullarton to a full contract for the 2017–2018 season. In May 2018, Fullarton announced he would leave the Bullets and basketball to play for Australian rules football for the Brisbane Lions in the AFL.

== AFL career ==
=== Brisbane Lions (2018–2023) ===
Fullarton spent the 2018 and 2019 seasons playing in the North East Australian Football League. He made his debut appearance in Round 13 of the 2020 AFL Season against St. Kilda coming off the bench, kicking one goal and two behinds. He kicked his first career AFL goal in the third quarter. The Lions won by two over St. Kilda 50 (6.14) to 48 (7.6).

=== Melbourne (2024–2025) ===
Fullarton was traded to the Melbourne Football Club on 13 October 2023 for a third round national draft pick.

In two seasons at the Demons, Fullarton played two senior games, before being delisted at the end of the 2025 season.

== Statistics ==
Legend
G	Goals	K	Kicks	D	Disposals	T	Tackles
B	Behinds	H	Handballs	M	Marks

Season	Team	No.	Games	Totals							Averages (per game)							Votes
Season	Team	No.	Games	G	B	K	H	D	M	T	G	B	K	H	D	M	T	Votes
2020 (Note: The 2020 season was played with 17 home-and-away matches per team (down from 22) and 16-minute quarters with time on (down from 20-minute quarters with time on) due to the impact of the COVID-19 pandemic.)	Brisbane Lions	47	2	1	3	5	4	9	1	2	0.5	1.5	2.5	2.0	4.5	0.5	1.0	0
2021	Brisbane Lions	21	12	3	1	52	73	125	22	21	0.3	0.1	4.3	6.1	10.4	1.8	1.8	0
2022	Brisbane Lions	21	5	2	0	23	15	38	12	4	0.4	0.0	4.6	3.0	7.6	2.4	0.8	0
2023	Brisbane Lions	21	0	—	—	—	—	—	—	—	—	—	—	—	—	—	—	0
2024	Melbourne	33	0	—	—	—	—	—	—	—	—	—	—	—	—	—	—	0
2025	Melbourne	33	2	0	0	5	4	9	1	2	0.0	0.0	2.5	2.0	4.5	0.5	1.0	0
Career			21	6	4	85	96	181	36	29	0.3	0.2	4.0	4.6	8.6	1.7	1.4	0
