= Francisco Farabello =

Argentine basketball player (born 2000)

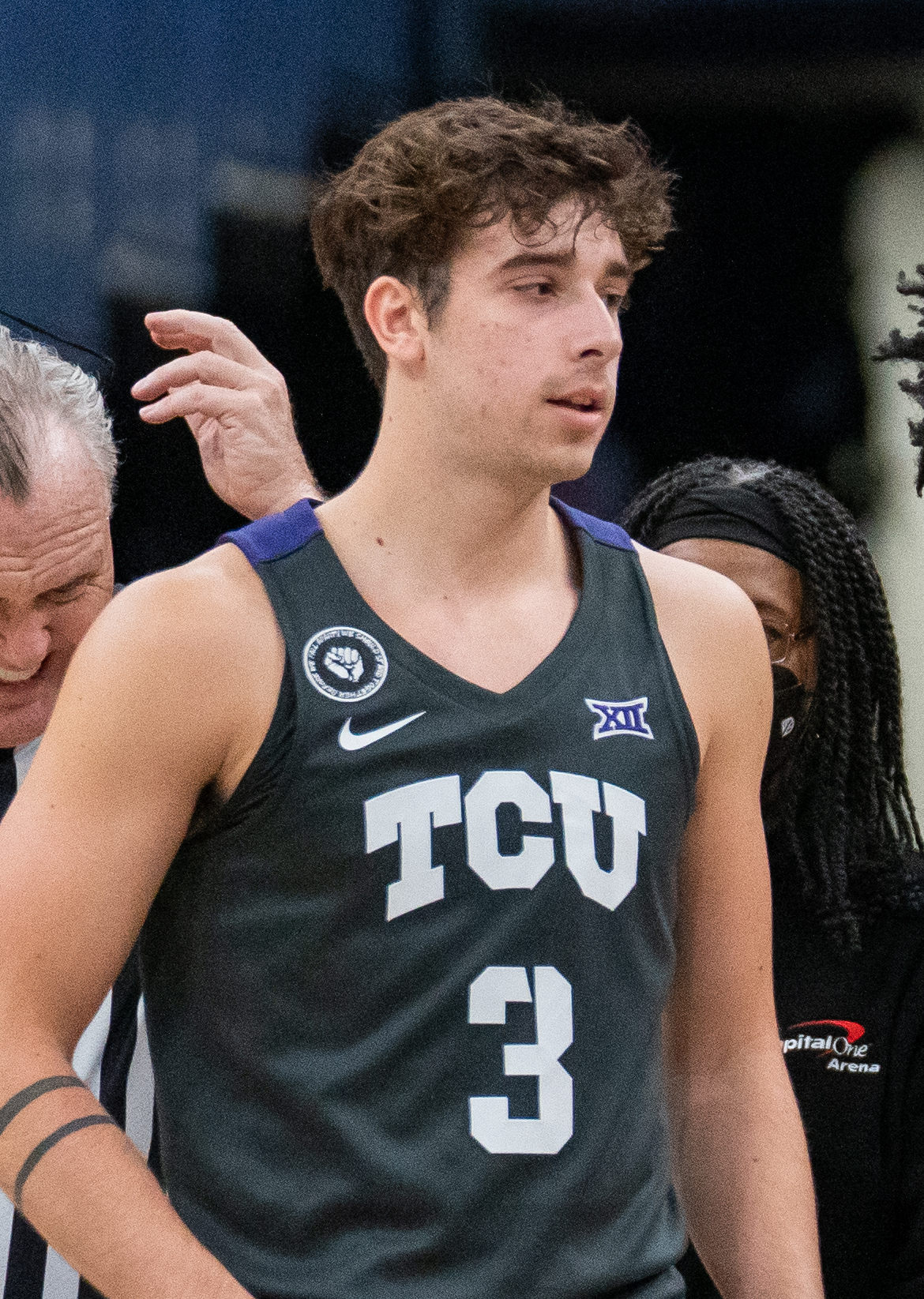
- Farabello with TCU in 2021

No. 5 – Pinheiros Basquete
- Position: Shooting guard
- League: Novo Basquete Brasil

Personal information
- Born: 1 November 2000 (age 24) Olavarría, Argentina
- Listed height: 6 ft 3 in (1.91 m)
- Listed weight: 178 lb (81 kg)

Career information
- College: TCU (2019–2022); Creighton (2022–2024)
- NBA draft: 2024: undrafted
- Playing career: 2024–present

Career history
- 2024–present: Pinheiros Basquete
Medals
Men's basketball
Representing Argentina
FIBA Americas Under-18 Championship
Bronze medal – third place	2018 Canada	Team

Francisco Farabello (born 1 November 2000) is an Argentine basketball player for Pinheiros Basquete of the Novo Basquete Brasil. He played college basketball for the TCU Horned Frogs and the Creighton Bluejays.

== Early life and career ==
Farabello is the son of Argentine basketball player Daniel Farabello and moved around growing up to follow his father's career. The younger Farabello attended the NBA Global Academy in Australia, as he considered the facilities in Argentina to be inadequate. He participated in Basketball Without Borders Americas camp in 2017, as well as the Basketball Without Borders Global Camp at the NBA All-Star game in 2018. Farabello committed to TCU in October 2018, citing a strong connection with the players and the coaching staff. He chose the Horned Frogs over offers from Davidson and Cincinnati.

== College career ==
On 22 February 2020, Farabello sustained a concussion in a game against West Virginia. He averaged 3.7 points, 1.4 rebounds and 2.2 assists per game as a freshman. Farabello dealt with injury and COVID-19 concerns during his sophomore season. He was ruled out for the season on 20 February 2021, after being sidelined for more than a month. Farabello averaged 5.3 points and 2.3 assists per game as a sophomore. He posted 4.4 points, 1.9 rebounds, and 1.8 assists per game as a junior. Following the season, Farabello transferred to Creighton. He served as the team's sixth man as a senior, averaging 3.0 points and 1.3 rebounds per game. In his final season, Farabello averaged 3.8 points, 2.1 rebounds, and 1.5 assists per game.

== Professional career ==
After going undrafted in 2024, Farabello signed with Pinheiros Basquete of the Novo Basquete Brasil.

== National team career ==
Farabello has represented Argentina in several international competitions. He won the bronze medal at the 2018 FIBA Under-18 Americas Championship. Farabello averaged 8.3 points, 5.3 assists, and 4.3 rebounds per game during the tournament. He was selected to participate in the 2019 FIBA Under-19 Basketball World Cup. Farabello averaged 6.4 points, 4 assists, and 3.7 rebounds per game.

== Career statistics ==
Legend
GP	Games played	GS	Games started	MPG	Minutes per game
FG%	Field goal percentage	3P%	3-point field goal percentage	FT%	Free throw percentage
RPG	Rebounds per game	APG	Assists per game	SPG	Steals per game
BPG	Blocks per game	PPG	Points per game	**Bold**	Career high

=== College ===
Year	Team	GP	GS	MPG	FG%	3P%	FT%	RPG	APG	SPG	BPG	PPG
2019–20	TCU	30	**7**	20.6	.409	.410	.846	1.4	2.2	0.8	**0.1**	3.7
2020–21	TCU	9	5	**24.4**	**.436**	**.448**	.200	1.7	**2.3**	**1.1**	0.0	**5.3**
2021–22	TCU	**34**	6	19.0	.385	.384	**.900**	**2.4**	1.3	0.6	0.0	4.7
Career		73	18	20.3	.402	.402	.813	1.9	1.8	0.7	0.1	4.4
