= Central High School (Woodstock, Virginia) =

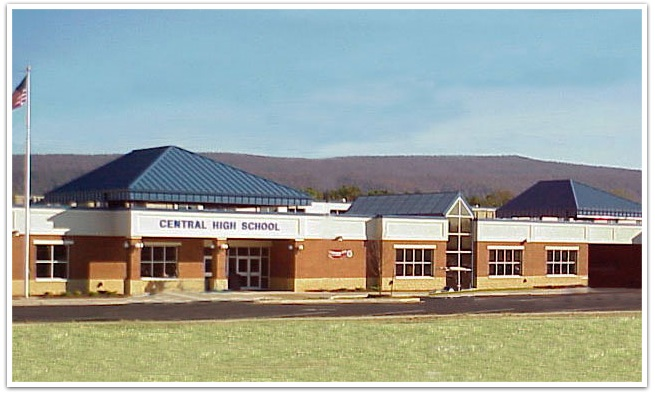

Location
- Woodstock, Virginia; United States
- Coordinates: 38°52′0.3″N 78°31′20.9″W

Information
- Type: Public
- School district: Shenandoah County Public Schools
- Principal: Elizabeth Bereczki
- Grades: 9-12
- Enrollment: 729
- Colors: Blue and Gold
- Mascot: Falcon
- Website: chs.shenandoah.k12.va.us

Central High School is a public High School located in the town of Woodstock, Virginia. It is part of the Shenandoah County Public Schools district. It was built in 1959, and it serves 729 students in grades 9-12.

Central High School's colors are royal blue and old gold. Their mascot is a Falcon. Central High School and the other two Shenandoah County high schools desegregated in 1963. In 2015, CHS was designated as a National Blue Ribbon School.

== Notable alumni ==
- Walker Lambiotte (1985), former basketball player
