= Manley Career Academy High School =

Manley High School

Location
- 2935 W. Polk Street; Chicago, Illinois 60612; United States; 41.8707°N 87.6999°W

Information
- School type: Public secondary
- Motto: "Journey To World Class"
- Opened: 1928
- School district: Chicago Public Schools
- Principal: Melanie Beatty
- Grades: 9–12
- Gender: Coed
- Enrollment: 108 (2017–18)
- Campus type: Urban
- Colors: Black; Red
- Athletics conference: Chicago Public League
- Team name: Wildcats
- Accreditation: North Central Association of Colleges and Schools
- Yearbook: Manley Memories
- Website: manleycareeracademy.org

Manley Career Academy High School (commonly known as Manley High School) is a public four-year high school located in the East Garfield Park neighborhood on the West Side of Chicago, Illinois, United States. Opened in 1928, Manley is a part of the Chicago Public Schools district.

== History ==
The school opened as Hugh Manley Junior High School in 1928 by the Chicago Public Schools and Chicago Board of Education. Manley was dedicated on September 28, 1928, along with another school; Spaulding School For The Crippled Children. The school cost $2.5 million and built to house a total of 3,000 students. Manley became a senior high school in 1933 when junior high schools were abolished in Chicago on July 12 of that year. Manley housed an elementary school within its building from 1933 until 1943. The U.S. Navy occupied the school building from January 1944 through the end of World War II to develop programs designed for and to aid in the war effort, which resulted in students being transferred to neighboring schools.

In September 1946, the school served as a trade school opening as Manley Trade and Vocational School, later becoming known as Cregier Vocational High School. By 1957, the trade school was relocated, and Manley was once again converted into an elementary and middle school. The elementary school was phased out and an extension of Marshall High School was created on the campus, serving at the location for two years: 1969–71. In June 1973, the Chicago Board of Education designated Manley as a "senior high school" and approved phasing out the seventh and eighth grade program. Manley's first senior high school graduating class occurred in June 1976.

== Athletics ==
Manley competes in the Chicago Public League (CPL) and is a member of the Illinois High School Association (IHSA). The school's sports teams are nicknamed the Wildcats. The boys' basketball team won the Public league championship twice (1978–79, 1979–80), and was Class AA champion once (1979–80).

In 1999, Manley fielded the first African American public high school rowing team in the United States, which was the subject of the 2020 documentary film A Most Beautiful Thing.

== Notable alumni ==
- Russell Cross (Class of 1980), former basketball player
- Luther Head (Class of 2001), former basketball player
