= ESPN Rise boys' high school basketball All-Americans =

An All-American team is an honorary sports team composed of the best amateur players of a specific season—who in turn are given the honorific "All-America" and typically referred to as "All-American athletes", or simply "All-Americans". Although the honorees generally do not compete together as a unit, the term is used in U.S. team sports to refer to players who are selected by members of the national media. Walter Camp selected the first All-America team in the early days of American football in 1889. Chuck Taylor made the first boys' high school basketball All-American selections in 1949. The ESPN RISE boys' high school basketball All-American (2009–2011), formerly EA Sports boys' high school basketball All-American (2005–2008) and Student Sports boys' high school basketball All-American (1989–2004), is an annual honorary list that includes twenty first team All-American selections of the best high school basketball players for a given season.

Each season the team is determined by the ESPN HS staff based solely on high school accomplishment, regardless of professional potential. A second team of thirty additional players is also chosen. Additionally, a single person has been recognized as Mr. Basketball USA since 1996.

This is considered to be one of the four current major boys' high school basketball All-American teams along with the Parade All-America and USA Today All-USA high school basketball teams, which are chosen after each season, as well as the preseason Street & Smith All-American team. Student Sports Magazine's executive editor Mark Tennis began overseeing All-America selections by the magazine in 1989, with a process that also chooses All-American teams by class (seniors, juniors, sophomores and freshmen). In 2005, EA Sports presented the Student Sports selections.

== Lists ==
=== 2012 ===
ESPN HS announced the 2012 All-American team.

First team

G -- Kyle Anderson, St. Anthony (Jersey City, N.J.) 6-8 Sr. – UCLA
G -- Marcus Smart, Marcus (Flower Mound, Texas) 6-4 Sr. – Oklahoma State
F -- Shabazz Muhammad, Bishop Gorman (Las Vegas) 6-6 Sr. – UCLA
F -- Jabari Parker, Simeon (Chicago) 6-8 Jr. – Duke (2013)
C -- Nerlens Noel, Tilton School (Tilton, N.H.; hometown: Everett, MA) 6-11 Sr. – Kentucky

Second team

G -- Marcus Paige, Linn-Mar (Marion, Iowa) 6-1 Sr. – North Carolina
G -- Rasheed Sulaimon, Strake Jesuit (Houston) 6-4 Sr. – Duke
F -- Alex Poythress, Northeast (Clarksville, Tenn.) 6-8 Sr. – Kentucky
F -- Julius Randle, Prestonwood Christian (Plano, Texas) 6-9 Jr. – Kentucky (2013)
C -- Isaiah Austin, Grace Prep (Arlington, Texas) 7-0 Sr. – Baylor

Third team

G -- Tyler Lewis, Oak Hill Academy (Mouth of Wilson, Va.; hometown: Statesville, NC) 5-11 Sr. – NC State
G -- Archie Goodwin, Sylvan Hills (Sherwood, Ark.) 6-5 Sr. – Kentucky
F -- Aaron Gordon, Archbishop Mitty (San Jose, Calif.) 6-8 Jr. – Arizona (2013)
F -- Perry Ellis, Wichita Heights (Wichita, Kan.) 6-8 Sr. – Kansas
C -- Tony Parker, Miller Grove (Lithonia, Ga.) 6-9 Sr. – UCLA

Fourth team

G -- Kris Dunn, New London (New London, Conn.) 6-3 Sr. – Providence
G -- Katin Reinhardt, Mater Dei (Santa Ana, Calif.) 6-5 Sr. – UNLV
F -- Sam Dekker, Sheboygan Lutheran (Sheboygan, Wis.) 6-7 Sr. – Wisconsin
F -- Winston Shepard, Findlay Prep (Henderson, Nev.; hometown: Sugar Land, TX) 6-8 Sr. – San Diego State
F -- Amile Jefferson, Friends' Central (Wynnewood, Pa.) 6-8 Sr. – Duke

=== 2011 ===
ESPN HS announced the 2011 All-American team.

G -- Bradley Beal, Chaminade (St. Louis, Mo.) 6-5 Sr. – Florida
G -- Quinn Cook, Oak Hill Academy (Mouth of Wilson, Va.; hometown: Washington, D.C.) 6-0 Sr. – Duke
F -- Anthony Davis, Perspectives Charter (Chicago, Ill.) 6-10 Sr. – Kentucky
F -- Perry Ellis, Wichita Heights (Wichita, Kan.) 6-8 Jr. – Kansas (2012)
F -- Dorian Finney-Smith, Norcom (Portsmouth, Va.) 6-7 Sr. – Virginia Tech (transferred to Florida after 2011–12 season)
F -- Mike Gilchrist, St. Patrick (Elizabeth, N.J.) 6-8 Sr. – Kentucky
G -- Tyrone Johnson, Montrose Christian (Rockville, Md.) 6-2 Sr. – Villanova (transferred to South Carolina after 2012 fall term)
G -- Myck Kabongo, Findlay Prep (Henderson, Nev.; hometown: Toronto) 6-2 Sr. – Texas
G -- Trevor Lacey, Butler (Huntsville, Ala.) 6-3 Sr. – Alabama
G -- Myles Mack, St. Anthony (Jersey City, N.J.) 5-8 Sr. – Rutgers
F -- Shabazz Muhammad, Bishop Gorman (Las Vegas, Nev.) 6-6 Jr. – UCLA
F -- James McAdoo, Norfolk Christian (Norfolk, Va.) 6-9 Sr. – North Carolina
F -- Le'Bryan Nash, Lincoln (Dallas, Texas) 6-7 Sr. – Oklahoma State
C -- Tony Parker, Miller Grove (Lithonia, Ga.) 6-9 Jr. – UCLA (2012)
G -- Austin Rivers, Winter Park (Winter Park, Fla.) 6-4 Sr. – Duke
G -- Shannon Scott, Milton (Milton, Ga.) 6-1 Sr. – Ohio State
G -- Marquis Teague, Pike (Indianapolis, Ind.) 6-2 Sr. – Kentucky
F -- Kyle Wiltjer, Jesuit (Portland, Ore.) 6-9 Sr. – Kentucky (transferred to Gonzaga after 2012–13 season)
G -- B. J. Young, McCluer North (Florissant, Mo.) Sr. – Arkansas
C -- Cody Zeller, Washington (Washington, Ind.) 6-10 Sr. – Indiana

=== 2010 ===
ESPN HS announced the 2010 All-American team.

Harrison Barnes, Ames (Ames, Iowa) 6-7 Sr. F North Carolina
Reggie Bullock, Kinston (Kinston, N.C.) 6-7 Sr. G North Carolina
Michael Gilchrist, St. Patrick (Elizabeth, N.J.) 6-7 Jr. F Kentucky
Tobias Harris, Half Hollow Hills West (Dix Hills, N.Y.) 6-8 Sr. F Tennessee
Ryan Harrow, Walton (Marietta, Ga.) 6-0 Sr. G NC State (transferred to Kentucky after 2010–11 season; transferred to Georgia State after 2012–13 season)
Kyrie Irving, St. Patrick (Elizabeth, N.J.) 6-2 Sr. G Duke
Joe Jackson, White Station (Memphis, Tenn.) 6-0 Sr. G Memphis
Terrence Jones, Jefferson (Portland, Ore.) 6-8 Sr. F Kentucky
Cory Joseph, Findlay Prep (Henderson, Nev.; hometown: Pickering, Ontario) 6-3 Sr. G Texas
Brandon Knight, Pine Crest (Fort Lauderdale, Fla.) 6-3 Sr. G Kentucky
Doron Lamb, Oak Hill Academy (Mouth of Wilson, Va.; hometown: Queens) 6-4 Sr. G Kentucky
C. J. Leslie, Word of God Academy (Raleigh, N.C.) 6-9 Sr. F NC State
Austin Rivers, Winter Park (Winter Park, Fla.) 6-3 Jr. G Duke
Josh Selby, Lake Clifton (Baltimore, Md.) 6-3 Sr. G Kansas
Jared Sullinger, Northland (Columbus, Ohio) 6-9 Sr. C Ohio State
Deshaun Thomas, Bishop Luers (Fort Wayne, Ind.) 6-7 Sr. F Ohio State
Tristan Thompson, Findlay Prep (Henderson, Nev.; hometown: Brampton, Ontario) 6-9 Sr. F Texas
Marcus Thornton, Westlake (Atlanta, Ga.) 6-7 Sr. F Georgia
Joseph Young, Yates (Houston, Texas) 6-2 Sr. G Providence
Patric Young, Providence (Jacksonville, Fla.) 6-9 Sr. F Florida

=== 2009 ===
ESPN HS announced the 2009 All-American team.

Avery Bradley, Findlay Prep (Henderson, NV; hometown: Tacoma, WA), 6-3 Sr – Texas
Kenny Boynton, American Heritage (Plantation, FL), 6-3 Sr. – Florida
DeMarcus Cousins, LeFlore (Mobile, AL), 6-10 Sr. – Kentucky
Derrick Favors, South Atlanta (Atlanta), 6-9 Sr. – Georgia Tech
Abdul Gaddy, Bellarmine Prep (Tacoma, WA) 6-3 Sr. – Washington
Keith "Tiny" Gallon Oak Hill Academy (Mouth of Wilson, VA; hometown: Vallejo, CA), 6-8 Sr. – Oklahoma
Michael Gilchrist, St. Patrick (Elizabeth, N.J.), 6-7 So. – Kentucky (2011)
Xavier Henry, Putnam City (Oklahoma City), 6-6 Sr. – Kansas
John Henson, Sickles (Tampa, FL), 6-10 Sr. – North Carolina
Wally Judge, Arlington Country Day (Jacksonville, FL), 6-8 Sr. – Kansas State (transferred to Rutgers after 2010–11 season)
Ryan Kelly, Ravenscroft School (Raleigh, NC), 6-10 Sr. – Duke
Brandon Knight, Pine Crest (Fort Lauderdale, FL), 6-3 Jr. – Kentucky (2010)
Mason Plumlee, Christ School (Arden, NC), 6-10 Sr. – Duke
Austin Rivers, Winter Park (FL), 6-4 So. – Duke (2011)
Renardo Sidney, Jr. Fairfax (Los Angeles), 6-9 Sr. – Mississippi State
Josh Smith, Kentwood (Covington, WA), 6-9 Jr. – UCLA (2010) (transferred to Georgetown after 2012 fall term)
Lance Stephenson, Lincoln (Brooklyn), 6-5 Sr. – Cincinnati
Jared Sullinger, Northland (Columbus, OH), 6-8 Jr – Ohio State (2010)
Dante Taylor, National Christian (Fort Washington, MD), 6-9 Sr – Pittsburgh
Tony Wroten, Jr., Garfield (Seattle), 6-5 So. – Washington (2011)

=== 2008 ===
Rivals.com announced the 2008 All-American team.

Al-Farouq Aminu (Norcross, GA) 6-8, Sr., Forward – Wake Forest
Luke Babbitt (Galena, Reno, NV) 6-8, Sr., Forward – Nevada
William Buford (Libbey, Toledo, OH) 6-5, Sr., Guard – Ohio State
Ed Davis (Benedictine, Richmond, VA) 6-8, Sr., Forward – North Carolina
DeMar DeRozan (Compton, CA) 6-6, Sr., Forward – USC
Tyreke Evans (American Christian, Aston, PA) 6-5, Sr., Guard – Memphis
Derrick Favors (South Atlanta, GA) 6-9, Jr., Center – Georgia Tech (2009)
Draymond Green (Saginaw, MI) 6-7, Sr., Forward – Michigan State
JaMychal Green (St. Jude, Montgomery, AL) 6-9, Sr., Forward – Alabama
Jrue Holiday (Campbell Hall, N. Hollywood, CA) 6-3, Sr., Guard – UCLA
Brandon Jennings (Oak Hill, Mouth of Wilson, VA; hometown: Compton, CA) 6-1, Sr., Guard – did not attend college; played professionally in Italy immediately after graduation
Greg Monroe (Helen Cox, Harvey, LA) 6-10, Sr., Forward – Georgetown
B.J. Mullens (Canal Winchester, OH) 7-1, Sr., Center – Ohio State
Mike Rosario (St. Anthony's, Jersey City, NJ) 6-2, Sr., Guard – Rutgers (transferred to Florida after 2009–10 season)
Samardo Samuels (St. Benedict's, Newark, NJ; hometown: Trelawny Parish, Jamaica) 6-9, Sr., Forward – Louisville
Lance Stephenson (Lincoln, Brooklyn, NY) 6-5, Jr., Guard – Cincinnati (2009)
Kemba Walker (Rice, New York, NY.) 6-0, Sr., Guard – Connecticut
Willie Warren (North Crowley, Fort Worth, TX) 6-3, Sr., Guard – Oklahoma
Elliot Williams (St. George's, Collierville, TN) 6-4, Sr., Guard – Duke
Tyler Zeller (Washington, IN) 7-0, Sr., Center – North Carolina

=== 2007 ===
Rivals.com announced the 2007 All-American team.

Jerryd Bayless (St. Mary's, Phoenix, AZ) 6-3, Sr., Guard – Arizona
Nick Calathes (Lake Howell, Winter Park, FL) 6-5, Sr., Guard – Florida
Jon Diebler (Upper Sandusky, OH) 6-7, Sr., Forward – Ohio State
Corey Fisher (St. Patrick's, Elizabeth, NJ) 6-1, Sr., Guard – Villanova
Jonny Flynn (Niagara Falls, NY) 6-0, Sr., Guard – Syracuse
Austin Freeman (DeMatha, Hyattsville, MD) 6-5, Sr., Forward – Georgetown
Eric Gordon (North Central, Indianapolis, IN) 6-5, Sr., Guard – Indiana
Blake Griffin (OK Christian, Edmond, OK) 6-8, Sr., Forward – Oklahoma
James Harden (Artesia, Lakewood, CA) 6-5, Sr., Guard – Arizona State
James Hickson (Wheeler, Marietta, GA) 6-9, Sr., Forward – NC State
Taylor King (Mater Dei, Santa Ana, CA) 6-8, Sr., Forward – Villanova
Gani Lawal (Norcross, GA) 6-9, Sr., Forward – Georgia Tech
Kevin Love (Lake Oswego, OR) 6-10, Sr., Forward – UCLA
O. J. Mayo (Huntington, WV) 6-5, Sr., Guard – USC
Patrick Patterson (Huntington, WV) 6-8, Sr., Center – Kentucky
Derrick Rose (Simeon, Chicago, IL) 6-4, Sr., Guard – Memphis
Kyle Singler (South Medford, Medford, OR) 6-9, Sr., Forward – Duke
Nolan Smith (Oak Hill Academy, VA; hometown: Washington, DC) 6-2, Sr., Guard – Duke
Corey Stokes (St. Benedict's, Newark, NJ) 6-6, Sr., Forward – Villanova
Chris Wright (St. John's, Washington, DC) 6-1, Sr., Guard – Georgetown

=== 2006 ===
Rivals.com announced the 2006 All-American team.

Darrell Arthur (South Oak Cliff, Dallas, TX) 6-9, Sr., Forward – Kansas
Michael Beasley (Oak Hill Academy, Mouth of Wilson, VA; hometown: Washington, DC) 6-9, Jr., Forward – Kansas State (2007)
Chase Budinger (La Costa Canyon, Carlsbad, CA) 6-7, Sr., Forward – Arizona
Demond Carter (Reserve Christian, LaPlace, LA) 5-10, Sr., Guard – Baylor
Daequan Cook (Dunbar, Dayton, OH) 6-5, Sr., Guard – Ohio State
Mike Conley Jr. (Lawrence North, Indianapolis, IN) 6-1, Sr., Guard – Ohio State
Kevin Durant (Montrose Christian, Rockville, MD) 6-9, Sr., Forward – Texas
Wayne Ellington (Episcopal Academy, Merion Station, PA) 6-5, Sr., Guard
Spencer Hawes (Seattle Prep, Seattle, WA) 7-0, Sr., Center – Washington
Gerald Henderson Jr. (Episcopal Academy, Merion Station, PA) 6-5, Sr., Forward – Duke
Tywon Lawson (Oak Hill Academy, Mouth of Wilson, VA; hometown: Clinton, MD) 6-0, Sr., Guard – North Carolina
Kevin Love (Lake Oswego, OR) 6-10, Jr., Forward – UCLA (2007)
O. J. Mayo (North College Hill, Cincinnati, OH) 6-5, Jr., Guard – USC (2007)
Vernon Macklin (Hargrave Military Academy, Chatham, VA; hometown: Portsmouth, VA) 6-9, Sr., Center – Florida
Greg Oden (Lawrence North, Indianapolis, IN) 7-0, Sr., Center – Ohio State
Scottie Reynolds (Herndon, VA) 6-1, Sr., Guard – Villanova
Jon Scheyer (Glenbrook North, Northbrook, IL) 6-6, Sr., Guard – Duke
Alex Stepheson (Harvard-Westlake, North Hollywood, CA) 6-10, Sr., Center – USC
Bill Walker (North College Hill, Cincinnati, OH) 6-6, Jr., Forward – Kansas State (2007)
Brandan Wright (Brentwood Academy, Brentwood, TN) 6-9, Sr., Forward – North Carolina
Thaddeus Young (Mitchell, Memphis, TN) 6-8, Sr., Forward – Georgia Tech

=== 2005 ===
Rivals.com announced the 2005 All-American team.

Jon Brockman (Snohomish, WA) 6-8 Sr. Forward
Mario Chalmers (Bartlett, Anchorage, AK) 6-2 Sr. Guard
Kevin Durant (Oak Hill Academy, Mouth of Wilson, VA; hometown: Washington, DC) 6-9 Jr. Forward
Monta Ellis (Lanier, Jackson, MS) 6-3 Sr. Guard
Bobby Frasor (Brother Rice, Chicago, IL) 6-3 Sr. Guard
Jamont Gordon (Oak Hill Academy, Mouth of Wilson, VA; hometown: Nashville, TN) 6-4 Sr. Guard
Danny Green (St. Mary's, Manhasset, NY) 6-6 Sr. Guard
Tyler Hansbrough (Poplar Bluff, MO) 6-9 Sr. Forward
Richard Hendrix (Athens, AL) 6-8 Sr. Forward
Amir Johnson (Westchester, Los Angeles, CA) 6-10 Sr. Center
O. J. Mayo (North College Hill, Cincinnati, OH) 6-5 Soph. Guard
Josh McRoberts (Carmel, IN) 6-10 Sr. Forward
C. J. Miles (Skyline, Dallas, TX) 6-6 Sr. Forward
Tasmin Mitchell (Denham Springs, LA) 6-7 Sr. Forward
Greg Oden (Lawrence North, Indianapolis, IN) 7-0 Jr. Center
Greg Paulus (Christian Brothers Academy, Syracuse, NY) 6-2 Sr. Guard
Martell Webster (Seattle Prep, Seattle, WA) 6-7 Sr. Forward
Louis Williams (South Gwinnett, Snellville, GA) 6-2 Sr. Guard
Brandan Wright (Brentwood Academy, Brentwood, TN) 6-9 Jr. Center
Julian Wright (Homewood-Flossmoor, Flossmoor, IL_ 6-8 Sr. Forward
