= Milton Jennings =

American basketball player

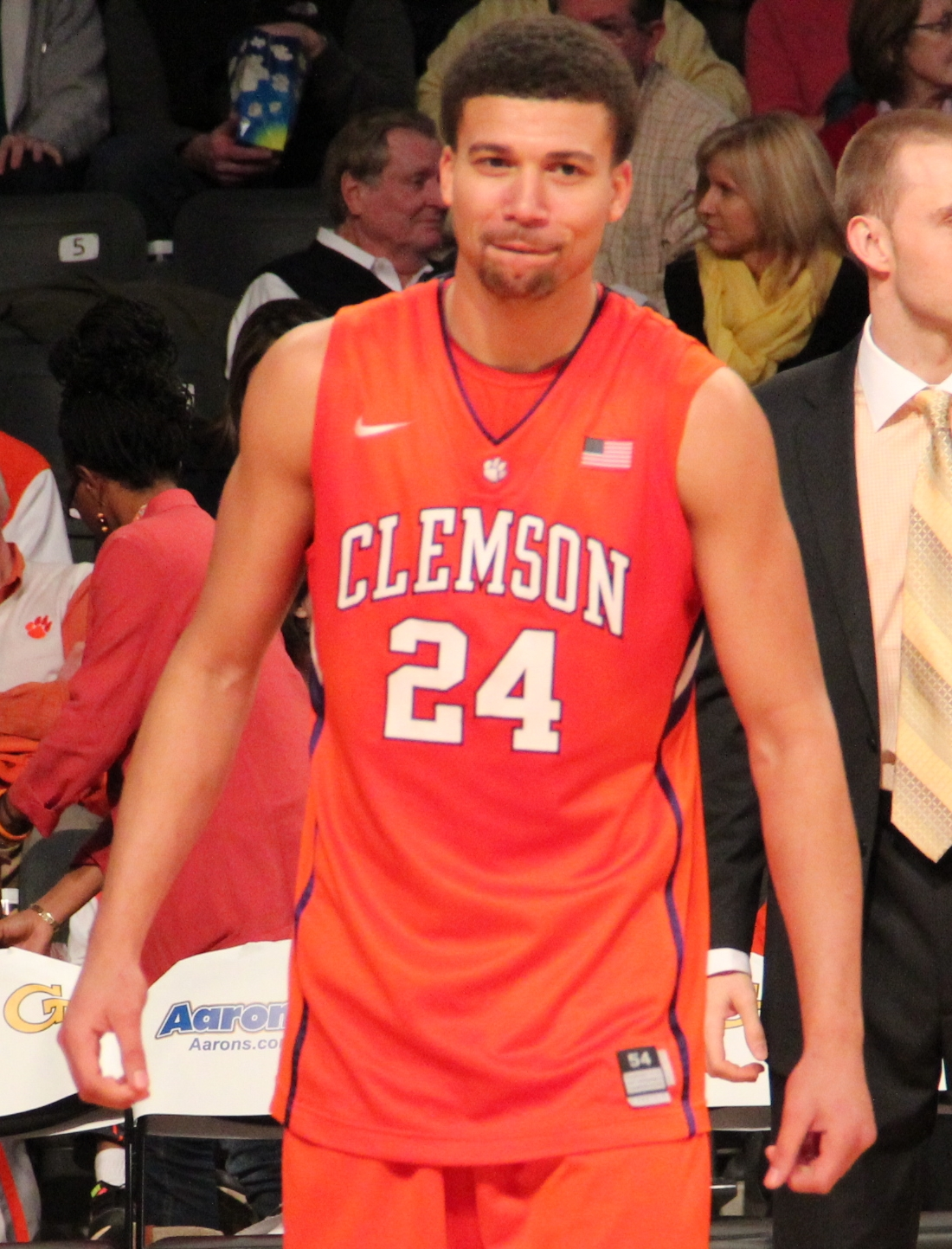
- Jennings playing for Clemson in 2013

Free agent
- Position: Forward

Personal information
- Born: June 26, 1990 (age 36) Charleston, South Carolina, U.S.
- Listed height: 6 ft 9 in (2.06 m)
- Listed weight: 225 lb (102 kg)

Career information
- High school: Pinewood Preparatory School (Summerville, South Carolina)
- College: Clemson (2009–2013)
- NBA draft: 2013: undrafted
- Playing career: 2013–present

Career history
- 2013–2014: Mobyt Ferrara
- 2016–2017: Basketballclub Winterthur
- 2017–2018: Torpan Pojat

Career highlights
- McDonald's All-American (2009); Second-team Parade All-American (2009); South Carolina Mr. Basketball (2009)

Milton Wayne Jennings (born June 26, 1990) is an American professional basketball player. He played collegiately for the Clemson Tigers.

== High school career ==
In high school, Jennings led Pinewood Preparatory School to four consecutive state championships at the AAA level, and was a two-time South Carolina Gatorade Player of the Year. He was a second-team Parade All-American and played in the 2009 McDonald's All-American game in Miami. He also played in the Capital Classic for the U.S. All-Stars. He was rated as the nation's #23 prospect by Scout.com, #25 by Rivals.com, and #26 by ESPNU. He was named to All-Tournament team of 2008 Chick-fil-A Classic, posting 25 points and 14 rebounds playing against Duke signee Mason Plumlee in the championship game. He posted 24 points and 12 rebounds vs. No. 1 Oak Hill Academy in the 2009 ESPN RISE National High School Invitational. He scored 2,536 points and pulled down 1,372 rebounds in his prep career playing for coach Pat Eidson at Pinewood.

== College career ==
In 2009, he was the highest-rated basketball recruit to enter Clemson in fifteen years. Jennings was the first McDonald's All-American to sign with Clemson since Sharone Wright in 1991, and the first McDonald's All-American from the state of South Carolina since Raymond Felton in 2002. Jennings signed with Clemson over offers from Florida, Connecticut, Georgetown and UCLA.

In 2010–11, Jennings was one of the most improved players on the Clemson roster. He was fourth on the team in scoring at 8.3 points per game and third on the team with an average of 5.2 rebounds per game. He averaged 20.1 minutes in playing time per game, the most of any Clemson reserve player. He led the team in free throw shooting with a 77.2 percentage. Jennings was at his best against the ACC's top two teams, Duke and North Carolina. He averaged 12.3 points and 8.7 rebounds in four games against those two schools. His top scoring effort was 16 points, which he accomplished twice, most importantly in the ACC tournament semifinals against the North Carolina. In that game, Jennings was 6 for 8 from the field, including 3 of 5 from three-point range, and added seven rebounds. Jennings had previously posted a double-double against the Tar Heels on February 12, 2011, with 15 points and a career-high 12 rebounds. He also posted double-double at Duke on the Blue Devils' Senior Night with 10 points and 11 rebounds. Jennings also notched eight points and six rebounds in a road win over College of Charleston, a homecoming game for the native of nearby Summerville.

== Professional career ==
Jennings went undrafted in the 2013 NBA draft. On July 24, 2013, he signed with Mobyt Ferrara of Italy for the 2013–14 season. In 39 games, he averaged 12.5 points, 7.7 rebounds and 1.1 assists per game.

On August 20, 2014, he signed with MZT Skopje of Macedonia. On September 17, 2014, he parted ways with MZT.

In August 2017, Jennings signed with Finland 1A-division club Torpan Pojat, Helsinki.

=== The Basketball Tournament ===
In 2017, Jennings participated in The Basketball Tournament with team Showtime. The team was eliminated in the first round of competition. The Basketball Tournament is an annual $2 million winner-take-all tournament broadcast on ESPN.
