= South Carolina Mr. Basketball =

Honor awarded to high school basketball players

The South Carolina Mr. Basketball honor recognized the top boys’ high school senior basketball player in the state of South Carolina. The award was presented annually by the Charlotte Observer.

== Award winners ==
Year	Player	High School	College	NBA/ABA draft
1990	Lawrence Mitchell	Conway	South Carolina	
1991	Larry Davis	Denmark-Olar	North Carolina; South Carolina	
1992	Marvin Orange	Irmo	Alabama	
1993	Ray Allen	Dalzell Hillcrest	Connecticut	1996 NBA draft: 1st Rnd, 5th overall by the Minnesota Timberwolves (traded to the Milwaukee Bucks)
1994	Kevin Garnett	Mauldin	None	1995 NBA draft: 1st Rnd, 5th overall by the Minnesota Timberwolves
1995	BJ McKie	Irmo	South Carolina	
1996	Jermaine O'Neal	Eau Claire	None	1996 NBA draft: 1st Rnd, 17th overall by the Portland Trail Blazers
1997	James Griffin	Greenville	College of Charleston	
1998	Tony Kitchings	South Aiken	South Carolina	
1999	Chuck Eidson	Pinewood Prep	South Carolina	
2000	Rolando Howell	Lower Richland	South Carolina	
2001	Jarod Gerald	Mullins High School	South Carolina Gamecocks Men's Basketball; South Carolina	
2002	Raymond Felton	Latta	North Carolina	2005 NBA draft: 1st Rnd, 5th overall by the Charlotte Bobcats
2003	Brandon Wallace	Silver Bluff	South Carolina	
2004	Ra'Sean Dickey	Marlboro County	Georgia Tech	
2005	Devan Downey	Chester	South Carolina; Cincinnati	
2006	Mike Jones	Lower Richland	Syracuse	
2007	Mike Holmes	Bishopville Lee Central	South Carolina; Coastal Carolina	
2008	Murphy Holloway	Dutch Fork	Ole Miss	
2009	Milton Jennings	Pinewood Prep	Clemson	
2010	Josh Corry	Gaffney	Limestone College	
2011	Rod Drummond	Wade Hampton	Roane State	
2012	Brice Johnson	Edisto	North Carolina	
2013	Justin McKie	Irmo	South Carolina	
2014	L. J. Peak	Gaffney	Georgetown	
2015	PJ Dozier	Spring Valley	South Carolina	
2016	Seventh Woods	Hammond	North Carolina	
2017	Jalek Felton	Gray Collegiate Academy	North Carolina	
2018	Zion Williamson	Spartanburg Day School	Duke	2019 NBA draft: 1st Rnd, 1st overall by the New Orleans Pelicans
2019	Josiah-Jordan James	Porter-Gaud School	Tennessee	
2021	Bryce McGowens	Legacy Early College	Nebraska	2022 NBA draft: 2nd Rnd, 40th overall by the Minnesota Timberwolves

=== Schools with multiple winners ===
School	Number of Awards	Years
Irmo	3	1992, 1995, 2013
Lower Richland	2	2000, 2006
Marlboro County	2	2001, 2004
Gaffney	2	2010, 2014
Pinewood Prep	2	1999, 2009

== See also ==
South Carolina Miss Basketball
