= 2009 McDonald's All-American Boys Game =

American high school basketball game

West	East
110	113
	1st half	2nd half	Total
West	63	47	110
East	55	58	113
- Date: April 1, 2009
- Venue: BankUnited Center, Coral Gables, Florida
- MVP: Derrick Favors
- Referees: Carl Bullard; Freddie Williams; Frank Raposo
- Attendance: 5,981
- Network: ESPN

McDonald's All-American

The 2009 McDonald's All-American Boys Game was an All-star basketball game played on Wednesday, April 1, 2009, at the BankUnited Center in Coral Gables, Florida, home of the University of Miami Hurricanes. The game's rosters featured the highest rated high school boys graduating in 2009. The game was the 32nd annual version of the McDonald's All-American Game, first played in 1978.

The 48 players were selected from 2,500 nominees by a committee of basketball experts. Coach Morgan Wootten, who had more than 1,200 wins as head basketball coach at DeMatha High School, was chairman of the selection committee. UCLA coach John Wooden, who has been involved in the McDonald's All-American Games since its inception, served as chairman of the Games and as an advisor to the selection committee.

Proceeds from the 2009 McDonald's All American High School Basketball Games went to Ronald McDonald House Charities (RMHC) of South Florida and its Ronald McDonald House program.

== 2009 Game ==
The 2009 game was held at the BankUnited Center on the University of Miami’s Coral Gables campus. The game was played on April 1, 2009 and was nationally televised on ESPN.

Prominent contributors to the East's victory included Derrick Favors, who earned the John R. Wooden MVP Award, tallying 19 points and eight rebounds, Dante Taylor, who recorded 15 points and six rebounds, Lance Stephenson, who delivered a performance with 12 points, four rebounds, six assists, and three steals, and Peyton Siva, who facilitated the offense with nine assists.

Conversely, the West Team executed a balanced offensive strategy, with six players reaching double figures in scoring. Keith Gallon of Oklahoma stood out as the primary performer for the West, leading in both points and rebounds with 20 and 7 respectively, followed by Avery Bradley Jr. of Texas, who contributed 15 points and six rebounds. John Henson of North Carolina showcased efficient shooting, shooting 70% from the field for 14 points.

The East Team staged a comeback from an eight-point halftime deficit, fueled by a strong second-half shooting performance of 60% and a substantial 19-point contribution from their bench players. This hard-fought 113-110 victory extends the East's lead to 18-14 in the overall series.

=== 2009 West Roster ===
ESPN 100 Rank	Name	Height	Weight	Position	Hometown	High school	College choice
1	Avery Bradley	6–3	180	G	Puyallup, Washington	Findlay Prep	Texas
14	Abdul Gaddy	6–3	183	G	Tacoma, Washington	Bellarmine Prep	Washington
11	Keith Gallon	6–9	293	C	Huffman, Texas	Oak Hill Academy	Oklahoma
6	John Henson	6–10	200	F	Odessa, Florida	Sickles High School	North Carolina
15	Wally Judge	6–9	230	F	Landover, Maryland	Arlington Country Day School	Kansas State
24	Tommy Mason-Griffin	5–11	192	G	Houston, Texas	James Madison High School	Oklahoma
10	Mason Plumlee	6–11	220	C	Winona Lake, Indiana	Christ School	Duke
7	Renardo Sidney	6–10	250	F	Los Angeles, California	Fairfax High School	Mississippi State
22	Michael Snaer	6–5	200	G	Moreno Valley, California	Rancho Verde High School	Florida State
36	David Wear	6–10	225	F	Huntington Beach, California	Mater Dei High School	North Carolina
37	Travis Wear	6–10	230	F	Huntington Beach, California	Mater Dei High School	North Carolina

=== 2009 East Roster ===
ESPN 100 Rank	Name	Height	Weight	Position	Hometown	High school	College choice
12	Lance Stephenson	6-6	220	G	Brooklyn, New York	Lincoln High School	Cincinnati
23	Maalik Wayns	6–1	185	G	Philadelphia, Pennsylvania	Roman Catholic High School	Villanova
17	Ryan Kelly	6–8	217	F	Raleigh, North Carolina	Ravenscroft School	Duke
27	Dexter Strickland	6–3	180	G	Rahway, New Jersey	St. Patrick High School	North Carolina
16	Dante Taylor	6–9	230	F	White Plains, New York	National Christian Academy	Pittsburgh
9	Kenny Boynton Jr.	6–3	190	G	Pompano Beach, Florida	American Heritage School	Florida
4	DeMarcus Cousins	6–10	269	C	Mobile, Alabama	LeFlore Magnet High School	Kentucky
26	Milton Jennings	6–9	215	F	Summerville, South Carolina	Pinewood Preparatory School	Clemson
25	Peyton Siva	6–0	175	G	Seattle, Washington	Franklin High School	Louisville
19	Dominic Cheek	6-6	185	G	Jersey City, New Jersey	St. Anthony High School	Villanova
20	Alex Oriakhi	6–9	240	C	Lowell, Massachusetts	Tilton School	UConn (Note: Oriakhi left Connecticut after his junior season of 2011–12, once the NCAA announced that UConn would be barred from the 2013 NCAA tournament due to academic sanctions. Since the postseason ban covered his final season of eligibility, he was allowed to transfer to another Division I school without sitting out a season, and played his final college season of 2012–13 at Missouri.)
2	Derrick Favors	6–9	225	C	Atlanta, Georgia	South Atlanta High School	Georgia Tech

=== Coaches ===
The West team was coached by:

- Head Coach Pat Clatchey of Mount St. Joseph High School (Baltimore, Maryland)
- Asst Coach Brett Davis (coach)
- Asst Coach Doug Nicholas

The East team was coached by:

- Co-Head Coach Darryl Burrows of Dillard High School (Fort Lauderdale, Florida)
- Co-Head Coach Mark Lieberman of Monsignor Edward Pace High School (Miami Gardens, Florida)
- Asst Coach Derek Heard

=== Boxscore ===
==== Visitors: West ====
##	Player	FGM/A	3PM/A	FTM/A	Points	Off Reb	Def Reb	Tot Reb	PF	Ast	TO	BS	ST	Min
1	*Renardo Sidney	5/14	1/ 3	0/ 0	11	2	4	6	2	3	0	1	0	17
3	*Abdul Gaddy	3/ 9	0/ 3	0/ 2	6	3	1	4	2	2	3	1	1	20
11	*Avery Bradley Jr.	6/10	1/ 2	2/ 3	15	3	3	6	2	1	2	0	2	23
13	*Xavier Henry	5/11	3/ 6	1/ 3	14	1	4	5	1	2	1	1	2	23
22	*John Henson	7/10	0/ 0	0/ 0	14	0	3	3	0	1	0	2	0	16
5	Tommy Mason-Griffin	2/11	1/ 6	0/ 0	5	0	1	1	1	4	3	0	1	20
12	David Wear	0/ 2	0/ 1	0/ 0	0	0	3	3	0	1	1	0	0	14
21	Michael Snaer	6/ 9	0/ 2	1/ 2	13	1	1	2	2	1	2	0	0	17
24	Travis Wear	3/ 5	0/ 0	0/ 0	6	1	0	1	2	3	1	0	1	11
31	Keith Gallon	8/11	1/ 1	3/ 3	20	1	6	7	3	0	1	0	1	21
32	Mason Plumlee	3/ 8	0/ 2	0/ 0	6	1	3	4	3	2	1	2	1	18
33	Wally Judge	Did not play – injury												
	Team					4	3	7						
	TOTALS	48/100	7/26	7/13	110	17	32	49	18	20	15	7	9	200

==== Home: East ====
##	Player	FGM/A	3PM/A	FTM/A	Points	Off Reb	Def Reb	Tot Reb	PF	Ast	TO	BS	ST	Min
1	*Lance Stephenson	6/11	0/ 2	0/ 2	12	0	4	4	5	6	6	0	3	23
2	*Maalik Wayns	2/ 6	0/ 1	1/ 1	5	0	1	1	0	7	1	0	0	18
4	*Ryan Kelly	3/ 6	0/ 1	0/ 0	6	0	2	2	2	0	0	0	0	13
7	*Dexter Strickland	0/ 4	0/ 2	2/ 2	2	0	4	4	2	1	1	0	0	15
34	*Derrick Favors	9/13	0/ 0	1/ 3	19	4	4	8	0	0	0	1	0	18
11	Dante Taylor	6/11	0/ 0	3/ 3	15	3	3	6	1	2	1	1	1	15
13	Kenny Boynton Jr.	4/11	0/ 4	2/ 3	10	1	3	4	1	3	2	0	0	20
15	DeMarcus Cousins	6/ 9	1/ 2	1/ 4	14	3	5	8	2	1	2	1	0	17
24	Milton Jennings	2/ 3	0/ 0	0/ 0	4	0	4	4	0	0	1	1	1	14
30	Peyton Siva	3/ 5	0/ 1	0/ 0	6	0	3	3	0	9	3	0	1	19
32	Dominic Cheek	6/ 8	2/ 2	1/ 5	15	1	2	3	1	0	0	1	1	14
33	Alex Oriakhi	1/ 3	0/ 0	3/ 5	5	2	2	4	1	1	0	1	1	14
	Team					1	3	4						
	TOTALS	48/90	3/15	14/28	113	15	40	55	15	30	17	6	8	200

(* = Starting Line-up)

== All-American Week ==
=== Schedule ===
- Tuesday, March 31: Powerade Jamfest
  - Slam Dunk Contest
  - Three-Point Shoot-out
  - Timed Basketball Skills Competition
- Wednesday, April 1: 32nd Annual Boys All-American Game

The Powerade JamFest is a skills-competition evening featuring basketball players who demonstrate their skills in three crowd-entertaining ways. The slam dunk contest was first held in 1987, and a 3-point shooting challenge was added in 1989. This year, for the first time, a timed basketball skills competition was added to the schedule of events.

=== Contest Winners ===
- The 2009 Powerade Slam Dunk contest was won by Avery Bradley Jr.
- Ryan Kelly was winner of the 2009 3-point shoot-out.
- The inaugural winner of the basketball skills competition was Dante Taylor.

== See also ==
2009 McDonald's All-American Girls Game
