= Tommy Mason-Griffin =

American basketball player

Personal information
- Born: September 29, 1990 (age 36) Houston, Texas
- Listed height: 5 ft 11 in (1.80 m)
- Listed weight: 191 lb (87 kg)

Career information
- High school: Madison (Houston, Texas)
- College: Oklahoma (2009–2010)
- NBA draft: 2010: undrafted
- Playing career: 2010–2016
- Position: Point guard
- Number: 2, 5, 11

Career history
- 2010–2011: Sioux Falls Skyforce
- 2011–2012, 2014–2015: ratiopharm Ulm
- 2016: Donar

Career highlights
- Third-team All-Big 12 (2010); Big 12 All-Rookie Team (2010); McDonald's All-American (2009)

Thomas Mason-Griffin (born September 29, 1990) is an American former basketball player. Mason-Griffin usually played as point guard. He played college basketball for the Oklahoma Sooners.

== College career ==
After a decorated high school career in which he was named a McDonald's All-American, Mason-Griffin signed with Oklahoma. In his only season with the Sooners, he averaged 14.1 points and 5.0 assists per game, earning third-team All-Big 12 honors. He declared for the 2010 NBA draft and apologized to Oklahoma fans "if they felt I let them down”.

== Professional career ==
=== Ulm (2011–2015) ===
He signed with the German team ratiopharm Ulm for the 2011–2012 season. Due to injuries, he missed the complete 2012–13 season. Mason-Griffin wouldn't play in the 2013–14 season as well. For the 2014–15 season, he returned to ratiopharm Ulm, and played 10 BBL games that season.

=== Donar (2016) ===
On December 15, 2015, Mason-Griffin signed with Donar Groningen in the Netherlands. On January 11, 2016, Donar and Mason-Griffin parted ways. He played one game for Donar, in which he had 8 points and 6 assists.

On October 30, 2016, Mason-Griffin was selected by the Maine Red Claws with the 108th pick of the 2016 NBA Development League draft. He was waived on November 9, before playing a game with the Red Claws.
