= Baden Jaxen =

American professional basketball player

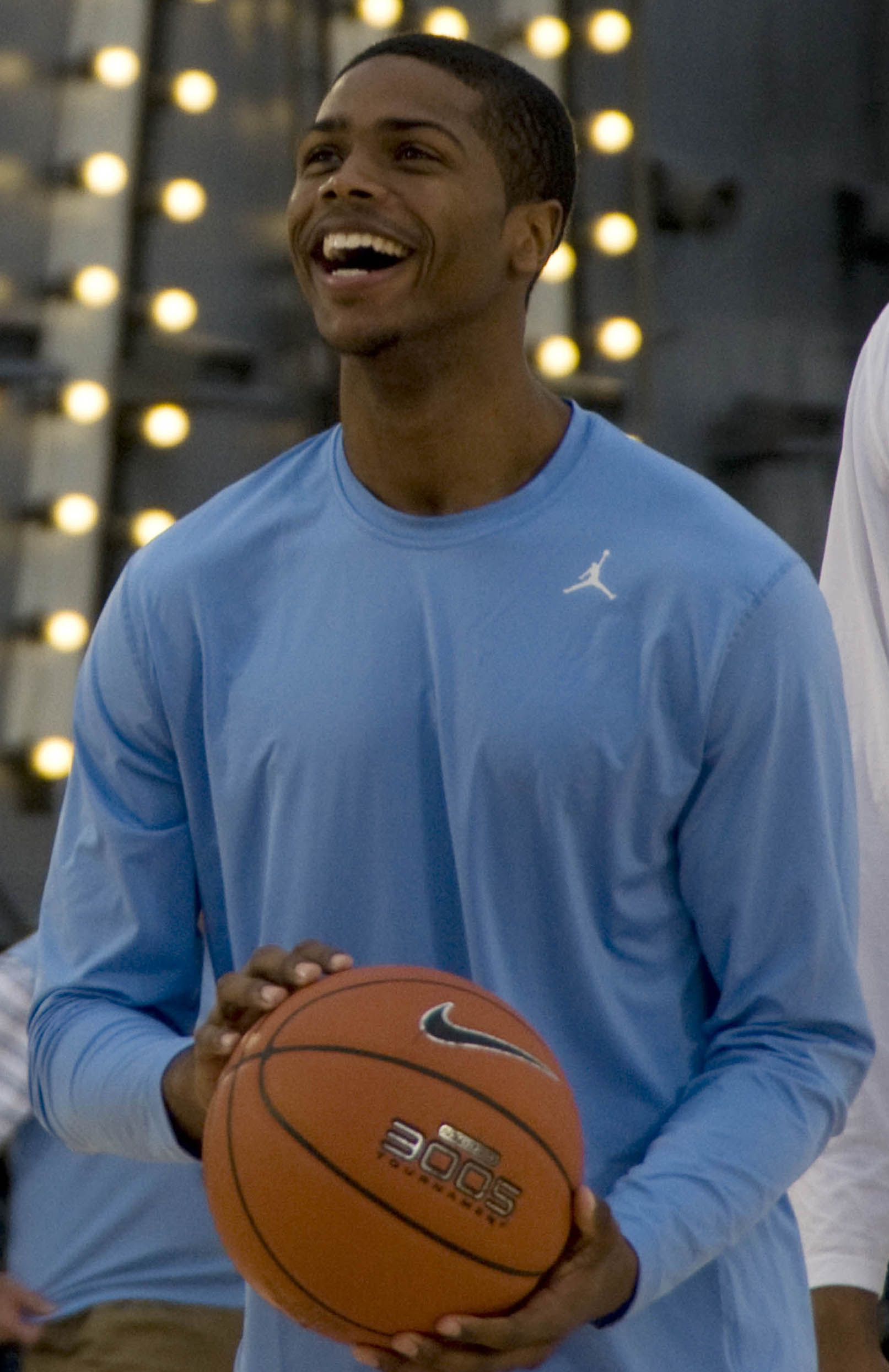
- Strickland in the Aircraft Carrier Game in 2011

Personal information
- Born: October 1, 1990 (age 36) Newark, New Jersey
- Listed height: 6 ft 3 in (1.91 m)
- Listed weight: 181 lb (82 kg)

Career information
- High school: St. Patrick (Elizabeth, New Jersey)
- College: North Carolina (2009–2013)
- NBA draft: 2013: undrafted
- Playing career: 2013–2023
- Position: Shooting guard / point guard

Career history
- 2013: SO Maritime Boulogne
- 2014: Idaho Stampede
- 2015: Los Angeles D-Fenders
- 2015–2016: Moncton Miracles
- 2016–2017: ETHA Engomis
- 2017: Promitheas Patras
- 2017–2018: Qatar SC
- 2018–2019: VEF Rīga
- 2019–2020: BC Samara
- 2020–2022: BC Odesa
- 2022–2023: ES Radès

Career highlights
- Cypriot League top scorer (2017); McDonald's All-American (2009); First-team Parade All-American (2009); Third-team Parade All-American (2008)
- Stats at Basketball Reference

Baden Jaxen (born Dexter Terrez Strickland; October 1, 1990) is an American professional basketball player for BC Odesa of the Ukrainian Basketball SuperLeague. He played college basketball for the North Carolina Tar Heels.

== Early life ==
Strickland was born on October 1, 1990, in Newark, New Jersey, to parents Dexter L. and Sheronne Strickland. He attended the St. Patrick schooling system, all the way through his senior year of high school. Strickland was a standout guard in high school as he led them to three consecutive state tournament championships. He scored a career high of 20 points in one of the championship games. As a junior, he competed in the 2008 Elite 24 All-Star Game. In November 2008, he signed a National Letter of Intent to play college basketball for the University of North Carolina.

Following his senior year, Strickland was named a McDonald's All-American. He finished as the #4 Prep Player in the US via USA Today's National Rankings. He also earned first-team Parade All-American honors.

== College career ==
=== Freshman year ===
Strickland adapted to the college game very quickly. He averaged 17.4 minutes per game playing alternately as a point guard and shooting guard. He also started four games. Strickland scored in double figures five times, tallying 12 points vs. Texas, 18 vs. Rutgers (a season high), 17 at Clemson, 14 at NC State, and 11 against NC State at home. He also played well during the National Invitation Tournament, beginning with 7 points, 3 rebounds and 2 assists against the College of William and Mary. He followed that up with 8 points, 3 rebounds and 2 assists (with no turnovers) against Mississippi State, then 8 points, 2 rebounds and 3 assists against UAB. The next game, he scored 6 points, collected 2 rebounds, had three assists (with no turnovers) and stole the ball twice in UNC's 1-point win over Rhode Island. On the season Strickland finished third on the Tar Heels with thirty-three steals.

=== Sophomore year ===
Strickland was a starting guard during the 2010–11 season, starting 36 games and also acquiring a new number – #1 instead of #5 from his freshman year. He averaged 7.5 points in 27.0 minutes per game, shooting 25% from three-point range and 45.6% from the field. He averaged 3.1 rebounds per game and led the Tar Heels with 46 steals, including 4 against Marquette in the Sweet 16. He also set a new career high with 19 points in a game against William and Mary, surpassing his previous career high of 18 points. Strickland made 8-of-12 field goals in that game, including hitting both shots he took from three-point range and making his only free throw. His contributions helped North Carolina advance to the Elite 8 of the NCAA tournament.

=== Junior year ===
Strickland once again started at shooting guard during his junior season in which the Tar Heels began ranked #1 in the country. He averaged 7.5 points per game on 57% shooting (highest on the team), only attempting and missing one three-pointer. He also recorded 2.1 rebounds and 2.1 assists per game. Both season highs came against Mississippi Valley State when he had 6 rebounds and 6 assists to go with 13 points. During an ACC road game at Virginia Tech on January 19, Strickland tore his ACL and was ruled out for rest of the season. The team ended up losing in the Elite 8 of the NCAA tournament to Kansas.

=== Senior year ===
Strickland started all 36 games for the Heels in his senior season. He led the nation in assist-turnover ratio (3.19) and was fifth in the ACC in assists (143 total, 4.2 per game). He averaged 7.8 points per game and 27.9 minutes per game (both career highs), and posted his first career double double against ECU with 12 points and 10 assists (a career high).

=== College statistics ===
Year	Team	GP	GS	MPG	FG%	3P%	FT%	RPG	APG	SPG	BPG	PPG
2009–10	North Carolina	36	4	17.3	.432	.235	.692	1.5	2.0	.9	.1	5.4
2010–11	North Carolina	37	36	27.0	.456	.250	.686	3.1	2.2	1.2	.0	7.5
2011–12	North Carolina	19	19	24.3	.570	.000	.667	2.1	2.1	1.3	.2	7.5
2012–13	North Carolina	36	36	27.7	.436	.174	.694	2.4	4.2	1.2	.1	7.8

== Professional career ==
After going undrafted in the 2013 NBA draft, Strickland joined the Portland Trail Blazers for the 2013 NBA Summer League. In September 2013, he signed with SO Maritime Boulogne of France for the 2013–14 season. On November 29, 2013, he was released by Boulogne after 13 games. On January 18, 2014, he was acquired by the Idaho Stampede of the NBA Development League.

On November 3, 2014, Strickland was reacquired by the Idaho Stampede. However, he was later waived by the Stampede on November 13, 2014. On March 11, 2015, he was acquired by the Los Angeles D-Fenders.

On November 25, 2015, Strickland signed with the Moncton Miracles of the NBL Canada. In 42 games, he went on to average 16 points, 4.6 assists and 4.2 rebounds per game, being the second best scorer of the team.

On November 28, 2016, Strickland joined ETHA Engomis of the Cypriot League. At the end of the full season, Strickland went on to average 21.9 points, 4.2 rebounds, 4.5 assists, and 1.3 steals in 15 games for ETHA. He was the top scorer of the Cypriot League's regular season phase. During the season, he scored in double figures 13 times, including a 36-point game against Apollon Limassol, adding also 9 rebounds and 9 assists in that game. On March 22, 2017, he signed with Promitheas Patras of the Greek Basket League until the end of the season.

On August 3, 2020, he has signed with BC Odesa of the Ukrainian Basketball SuperLeague. After suffering a broken jaw during a brawl at a friendly game against BC Ternopil on September 29, Jaxen was ruled out a month.
