= Wally Judge =

American basketball player

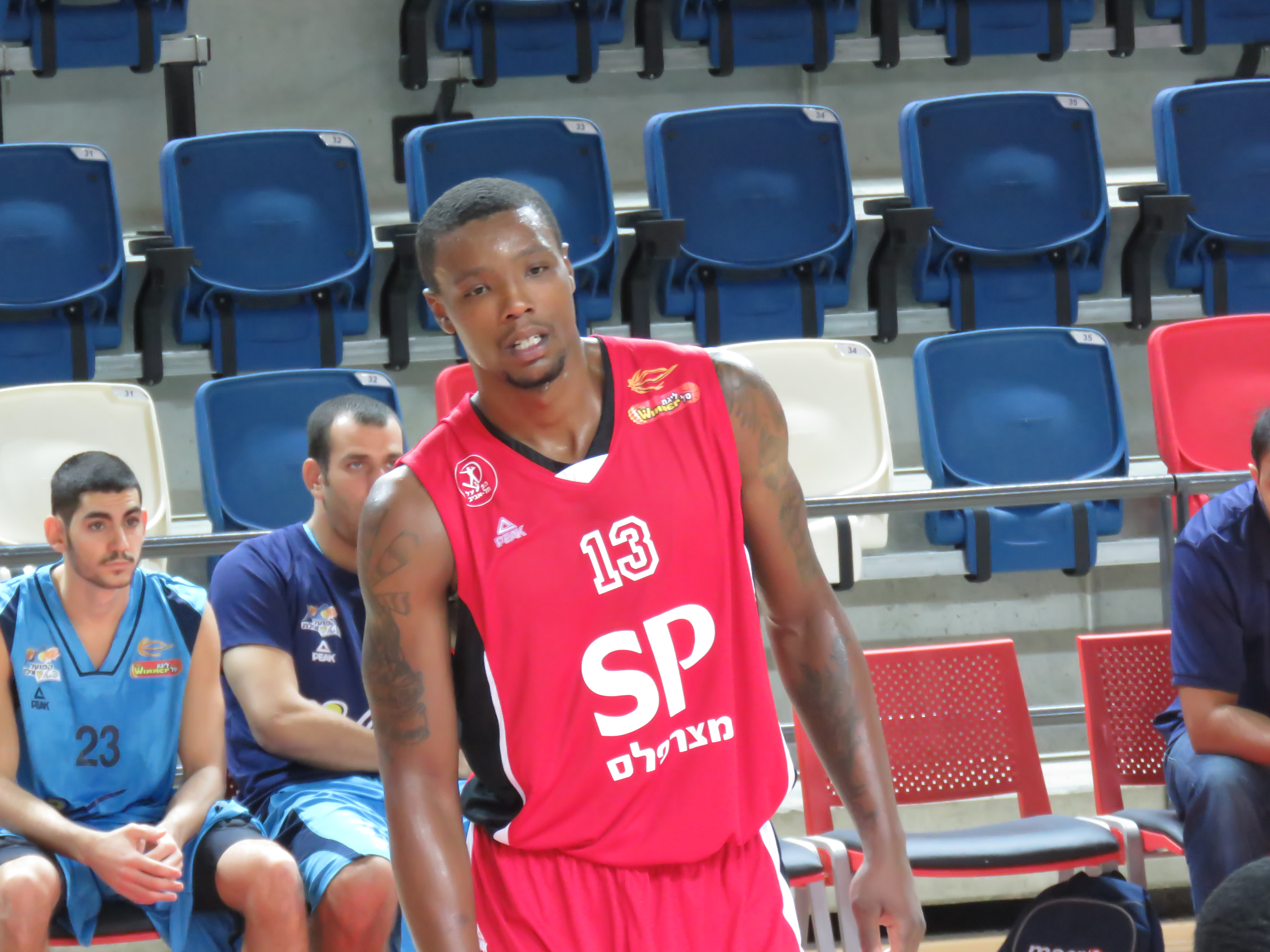
- Judge playing for Hapoel Tel Aviv in 2015

Free agent
- Position: Power forward / center

Personal information
- Born: August 24, 1990 (age 36) Washington, D. C.
- Listed height: 6 ft 9 in (2.06 m)
- Listed weight: 275 lb (125 kg)

Career information
- High school: Bladensburg (Bladensburg, Maryland); Arlington Country Day (Jacksonville, Florida)
- College: Kansas State (2009–2011); Rutgers (2012–2014)
- NBA draft: 2014: undrafted
- Playing career: 2014–present

Career history
- 2014–2015: V. L. Pesaro
- 2015: Hapoel Tel Aviv
- 2015–2016: Peñarol (MdP)
- 2016–2017: Tampereen Pyrintö

Career highlights
- McDonald's All-American (2009); Second-team Parade All-American (2009)

Wallace Eugene Judge Jr. (born August 24, 1990) is an American professional basketball player. He played high school basketball at Arlington Country Day School in Jacksonville, Florida, where he was a 5-star recruit and a McDonald's All-American in his senior year in 2009 where he averaged 20.8 points and 20.4 rebounds a game. He then played his freshman and sophomore seasons of college basketball with the Kansas State Wildcats, and then transferred to Rutgers, where he played his final two years of eligibility. After going undrafted in the 2014 NBA draft, Judge started a professional career in Europe with Italian team Victoria Libertas Pesaro. Throughout his career he has played in the top leagues of Argentina, Finland, Israel and Italy.

== High school career ==
Judge was born in Washington, D.C., the son of Wallace Sr. and Rosemary (née Yorn). He initially attended Bladensburg High School in Bladensburg, Maryland, and he was part of the varsity team starting his freshman year. In his sophomore season at Bladensburg, Judge averaged 14 points and 11 rebounds per game, and was an Honorable Mention in the All-Met team selected by the Washington Post. Halfway through his junior year, Judge transferred to Arlington Country Day School in Jacksonville, Florida, where he was coached by former NBA player Rex Morgan. At Arlington Country Day, Judge was a starter and was considered the team's best player together with Rodney McGruder; in his junior season Judge won the Florida state title, averaging 17 points and 11 rebounds per game.

During Judge's senior year, he won his second state title. On December 8, 2008, he recorded a season high in scoring with 29 points in a game against University Christian School, and on December 22 he posted 22 rebounds against Olympia High School. In the championship game, Judge scored 21 points and blocked 4 shots, shooting 9/12 from the field. In his senior season he averaged 18.5 points, 17.1 rebounds and 2.9 assists per game, and was a 5-star recruit, ranked among the best players in the nation by several recruiting services: Rivals.com ranked him 18th overall, and the 7th best forward in his class; ESPN ranked him the 15th best player in the nation, while Hoop Scoop ranked him the 5th best player overall. He was selected in the ESPN Rise All-American First Team, and was a second-team Parade All-American. He was selected to play in the Jordan Brand Classic and in the McDonald's All-American Boys Game. He scored 18 points and had 7 rebounds as a member of the White team during the 2009 Jordan Brand Classic, while he did not play in the McDonald's game due to an injury to his back occurred during a practice session.

=== Recruiting ===
College recruiting
Name	Hometown	School	Height	Weight	Commit date
Wally Judge; PF	Washington DC	Arlington Country Day School	6 ft 9 in (2.06 m)	210 lb (95 kg)	Oct 16, 2007
Wally Judge; PF	Recruit ratings: Scout: Rivals: (97)				
Overall recruit ranking: Scout: 28 Rivals: 20 ESPN: 16
Note: In many cases, Scout, Rivals, 247Sports, On3, and ESPN may conflict in their listings of height and weight.; In these cases, the average was taken. ESPN grades are on a 100-point scale.; Sources: "2009 Kansas State Basketball Commits". Rivals.; "2009 Kansas State Basketball Commits". Scout.; "2009 Kansas State Basketball Commits". ESPN.; "Scout.com Team Recruiting Rankings". Scout.; "2009 Team Ranking". Rivals.

== College career ==
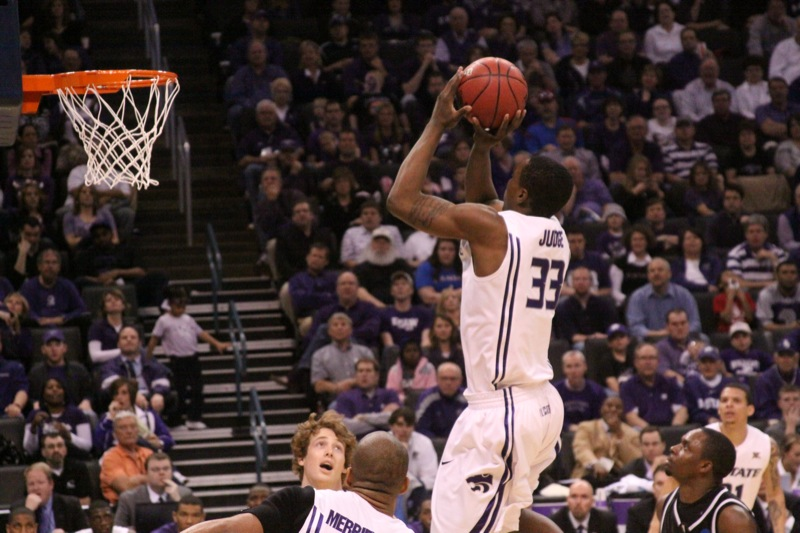
Judge shooting in 2010

Judge was recruited by several major NCAA Division I programs, and received offers from Georgetown, Kansas State, Maryland, Villanova and Virginia, among others; he committed to play for Kansas State on October 16, 2007 and signed on February 4, 2009. In a 2019 article, 247Sports.com mentioned him as the top player signed by KSU in the 2000–2009 decade. Coach Frank Martin put Judge in the rotation as a reserve, and over 36 appearances in his freshman year, Judge had 6 starts. Judge wore jersey number 33 and debuted with the Wildcats on November 13, 2009, scoring 5 points against Loyola; two days later, he had his first double-digits scoring game with 11 against Western Illinois. He scored a season-high 15 points in a December 19 game against Alabama, and on January 30, 2010, he had his best rebounding game, posting 9 against Kansas. He played 36 out of 37 possible games, averaging 3.3 points, 3 rebounds and 0.5 blocks per game in 11.7 minutes per game (8.5 minutes in Big 12 play); he was the 5th best rebounder on the team, and the 7th best scorer.

Judge's sophomore season under Martin ended after 17 games in which he made 11 starts. On December 31, 2010, he scored a career-high 22 points against North Florida and he posted improved averages of 5.5 points and 3.9 rebounds in 15.2 minutes per game, but he decided to leave the team in January. He declared himself available to transfer, and in May 2011 he opted to transfer to Rutgers, choosing the Scarlet Knights over Maryland and Washington.

Due to NCAA transfer rules, Judge had to redshirt the entire 2011–12 season, and was eligible to play for Rutgers in the 2012–13 season. In the preseason, CBSSports.com mentioned him one of the top transfers in Division I basketball. In his first year at Rutgers (his junior year of college eligibility), Judge started 30 out of 31 games, averaging a then career-high 22.2 minutes per game under coach Mike Rice Jr. He debuted with Rutgers on November 9, 2012, against St. Peter's, recording a double-double with 11 points and 12 rebounds. On March 12, 2013, he scored a season-high 20 points against DePaul during the 2013 Big East tournament. At the end of the season was the third best scorer on the team with 7.1 points per game, and he was the best rebounder with 5.4.

Judge was confirmed in the starting lineup for his senior season under newly appointed coach Eddie Jordan. He recorded career-highs in minutes (22.8), points (7.5) and rebounds (6.2) per game, starting 29 out of 31 games. He ranked 4th on the team in scoring and second in rebounding with 6.2 per game (behind Kadeem Jack's 6.8) and blocks with 1.1 (again behind Jack who had 1.3).

=== College statistics ===
Year	Team	GP	GS	MPG	FG%	3P%	FT%	RPG	APG	SPG	BPG	PPG
2009–10	Kansas State	36	6	11.7	.438	.000	.581	3.0	0.3	0.1	0.5	3.3
2010–11	Kansas State	17	11	15.2	.432	.000	.462	2.0	3.9	0.9	0.4	5.5
2011–12	Rutgers	Did not play – transfer										
2012–13	Rutgers	31	30	22.2	.526	.000	.493	5.4	1.0	0.4	0.6	7.1
2013–14	Rutgers	31	29	22.8	.481	.000	.532	6.2	0.7	0.6	1.1	7.5
Career		115	76	18.0	.480	.000	.520	4.7	0.7	0.3	0.7	5.8

== Professional career ==
After the end of his college career, Judge was automatically eligible for the 2014 NBA draft, where he went undrafted. In early August 2014, Italian Serie A team Victoria Libertas Pesaro announced the signing of Judge on a one-year contract. Judge made his debut with Pesaro October 12, 2014, in a game against Brindisi, scoring 4 points and grabbing 3 rebounds in 16 minutes of play. Judge played a total of 30 games during the 2014–15 Lega Basket Serie A, averaging 9 points, 7 rebounds and 0.6 blocks in 24.2 minutes of playing time playing as a center.

In June 2015 Judge announced that he was leaving Pesaro, and signed a two-year contract with Israeli team Hapoel Tel Aviv. Judge played only 2 games during the 2015–16 Israeli Basketball Super League, and scored 1 total point in 16.5 minutes of average playing time. He then transferred to Argentine side Peñarol de Mar del Plata: he appeared in 3 games during the 2015–16 Liga Nacional de Básquet season, and averaged 5.7 points and 4 rebounds per game.

In 2016 Judge signed with Tampereen Pyrintö of the Finnish Korisliiga, and he played 17 games in the 2016–17 season, averaging 10.9 points and 9.3 rebounds per game in 28.6 minutes per game, all career highs as a professional player.

Present day Judge is a management trainee in the Aldi (Albrecht Foods) stores in the northeast United States. He has 3 cats.
