= Renardo Sidney =

American professional basketball player (born 1989)

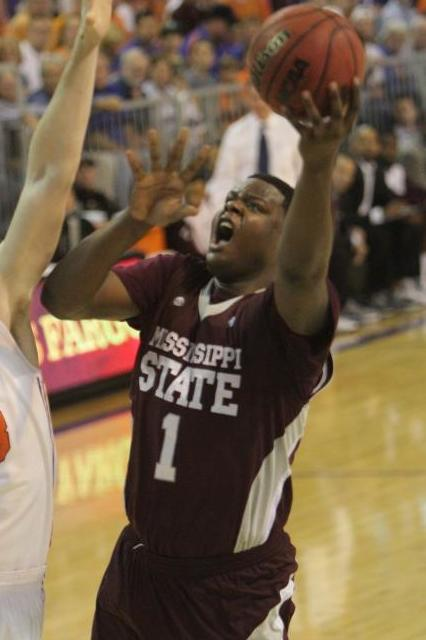

Personal information
- Born: December 6, 1989 (age 36) Jackson, Mississippi, U.S.
- Listed height: 6 ft 10 in (2.08 m)
- Listed weight: 280 lb (127 kg)

Career information
- High school: Artesia (Lakewood, California); Fairfax (Los Angeles, California)
- College: Mississippi State (2009–2012)
- NBA draft: 2012: undrafted
- Playing career: 2012–present
- Position: Center

Career highlights
- McDonald's All-American (2009); First-team Parade All-American (2009); Fourth-team Parade All-American (2008)

Renardo Sidney, Jr. (born December 6, 1989) is an American professional basketball player. An All-American in high school, he played college basketball for the Mississippi State Bulldogs from 2009 to 2012.

== High school ==
In Sidney's sophomore year of high school at Artesia High School, he averaged 18.6 points and 9.0 rebounds per game, earning All-State honors, and leading his team to the State Division 3 championship. After his sophomore season at Arestia High School, Sidney transferred to Fairfax High School. As a junior at Fairfax High School, Sidney averaged 24.0 points and 13.3 rebounds per game and was an all-state selection. In his senior season, Sidney averaged 26.5 points and 13.5 rebounds per game. He was also an all-state selection and was named a McDonald's and Parade All-American.

== College career ==
Sidney missed his entire freshman season at Mississippi State due to an NCAA suspension. After sitting out the first nine games of his sophomore season due to a suspension, Sidney appeared in 19 games and started 18. He averaged 14.2 points and 7.6 rebounds per game. In Sidney's junior season, he averaged 9.7 points and 5.2 rebounds per game. Following his junior season at Mississippi State, Sidney declared for the 2012 NBA draft, but went undrafted.

== Professional career ==
On November 7, 2012, Sidney joined the Los Angeles D-Fenders of the NBA D-League.

On December 13, 2013, Sidney signed with Guaros de Lara in Venezuela.

On January 10, 2016, Sidney was selected as the number one overall pick to the Compton Airmen in the inaugural draft of the California Basketball Association.
