= Ryan Kelly (basketball) =

American basketball player (born 1991)

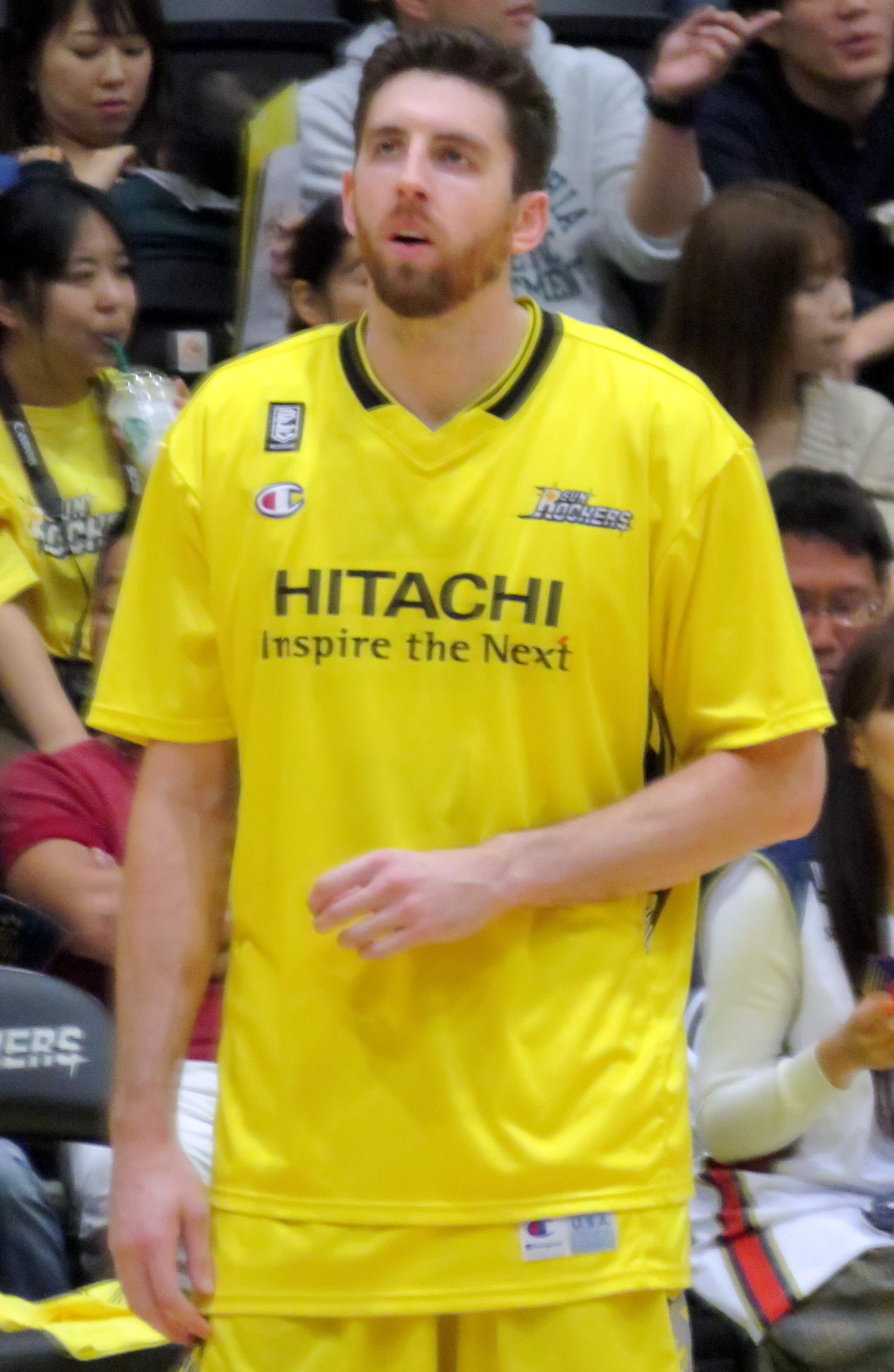
- Kelly with the Sun Rockers in 2018

No. 4 – Fukui Blowinds
- Position: Power forward
- League: B.League

Personal information
- Born: April 9, 1991 (age 35) Carmel, New York, U.S.
- Listed height: 6 ft 11 in (2.11 m)
- Listed weight: 230 lb (104 kg)

Career information
- High school: Ravenscroft (Raleigh, North Carolina)
- College: Duke (2009–2013)
- NBA draft: 2013: 2nd round, 48th overall pick
- Drafted by: Los Angeles Lakers
- Playing career: 2013–present

Career history
- 2013–2016: Los Angeles Lakers
- 2013–2016: →Los Angeles D-Fenders
- 2016–2017: Atlanta Hawks
- 2017: Maine Red Claws
- 2017–2018: Real Betis Energía Plus
- 2018–2024: Sun Rockers Shibuya
- 2024–present: Fukui Blowinds

Career highlights
- NCAA champion (2010); McDonald's All-American (2009); First-team Parade All-American (2009)
- Stats at NBA.com
- Stats at Basketball Reference
Medals
Men's basketball
Representing United States
FIBA Americas U-18 Championship
Silver medal – second place	2008 Argentina	Team

Ryan Matthew Kelly (born April 9, 1991) is an American professional basketball player for the Fukui Blowinds of the B.League in Japan. He played college basketball for the Duke Blue Devils.

== High school career ==
Kelly was a four-year forward at Ravenscroft School in Raleigh, North Carolina. He holds school career records in points (2,065), points per game (17.5), blocks (379), rebounds (950), free throws (312), field goals (864) and field goal percentage (.600, 864-of-1441). He also has single season records in points (882), points per game (25.2), rebounds (356), free throws (134), field goals (336) and field goal percentage (.620, 297-of-479). As a Sophomore, Kelly averaged 14.2 PPG, 8.7 rebounds, and 3.9 blocks. As a Junior, Kelly averaged 23.7 points, 8.1 rebounds and 3.1 blocks while leading his team to a 24–6 record and fifth-place finish in the state. He led Ravenscroft to a 28–7 record as a senior, posting 25.2 points, 10.2 rebounds, 2.8 blocks, 2.0 assists and 1.7 steals per game on the year. He was named a 2009 McDonald's All-American, as well as a Jordan Brand All-American and rated in the top 20 overall by Scout.com (No. 12), ESPN.com (No. 17) and Rivals.com (No. 20).

== College career ==
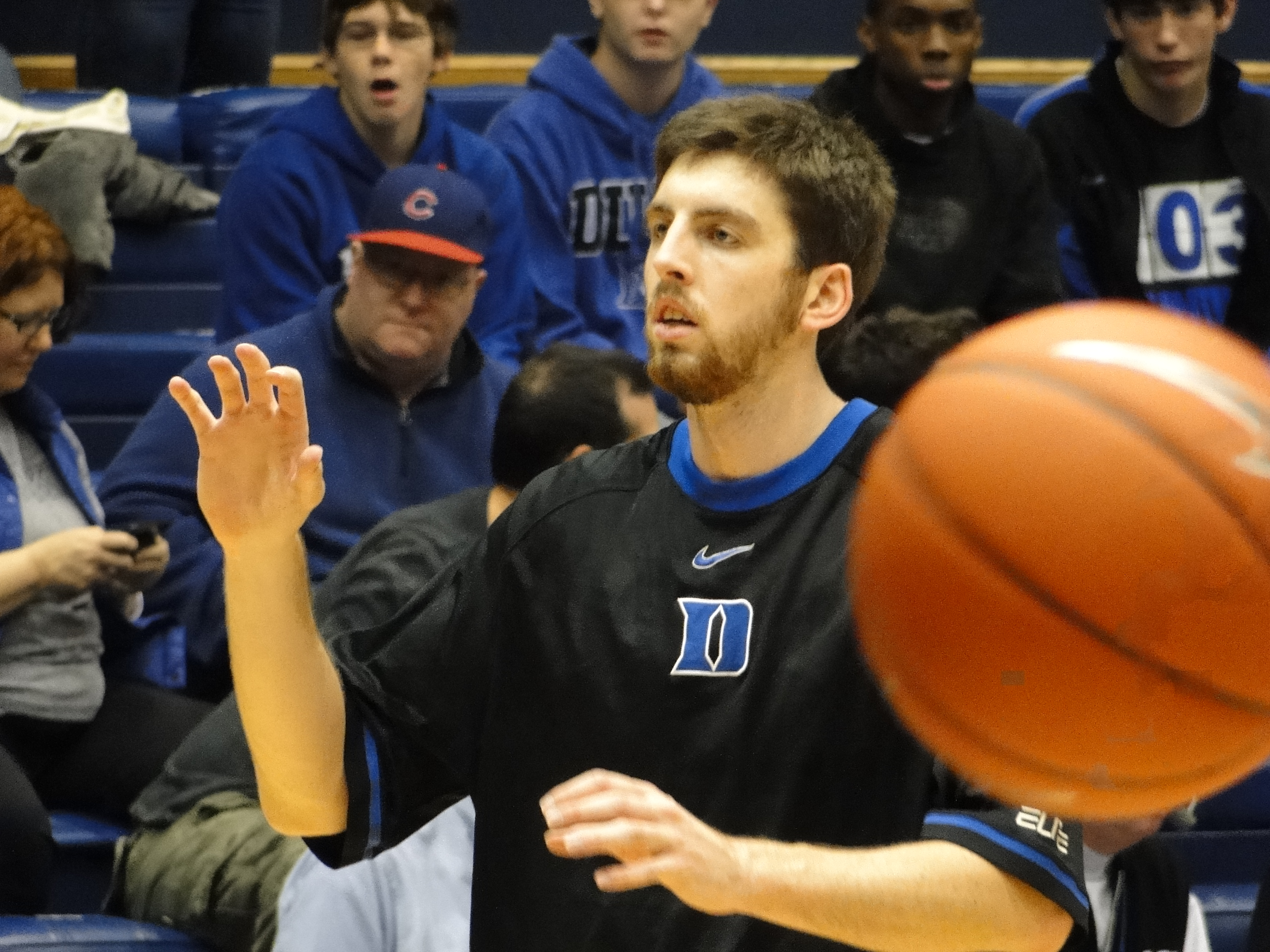
Kelly at Duke in 2010

Kelly committed to play for Duke under coach Mike Krzyzewski. During his freshman season, Kelly played backup to forward Kyle Singler, only playing in 35 games averaging 1.2 points per game. Kelly's sophomore year he was called on more, averaging 6.6 points, 3.7 rebounds and 1.4 blocks per game, in 37 games for the Blue Devils. For his junior season Kelly was asked to be team captain, playing in 31 games and starting in 19. He averaged 11.8 points, 5.4 rebounds, 1.1 assists and 1.1 blocks per game. He missed the last part of the season due to a foot injury. His senior year, Kelly was again bothered early in the year by the same foot injury, which had him sidelined for several weeks. He finished his career at Duke averaging 12.9 points, 1.6 blocks, and 5.3 rebounds. He was also named to the ACC All-Academic Team all 4 years at Duke.

== Professional career ==
=== Los Angeles Lakers (2013–2016) ===
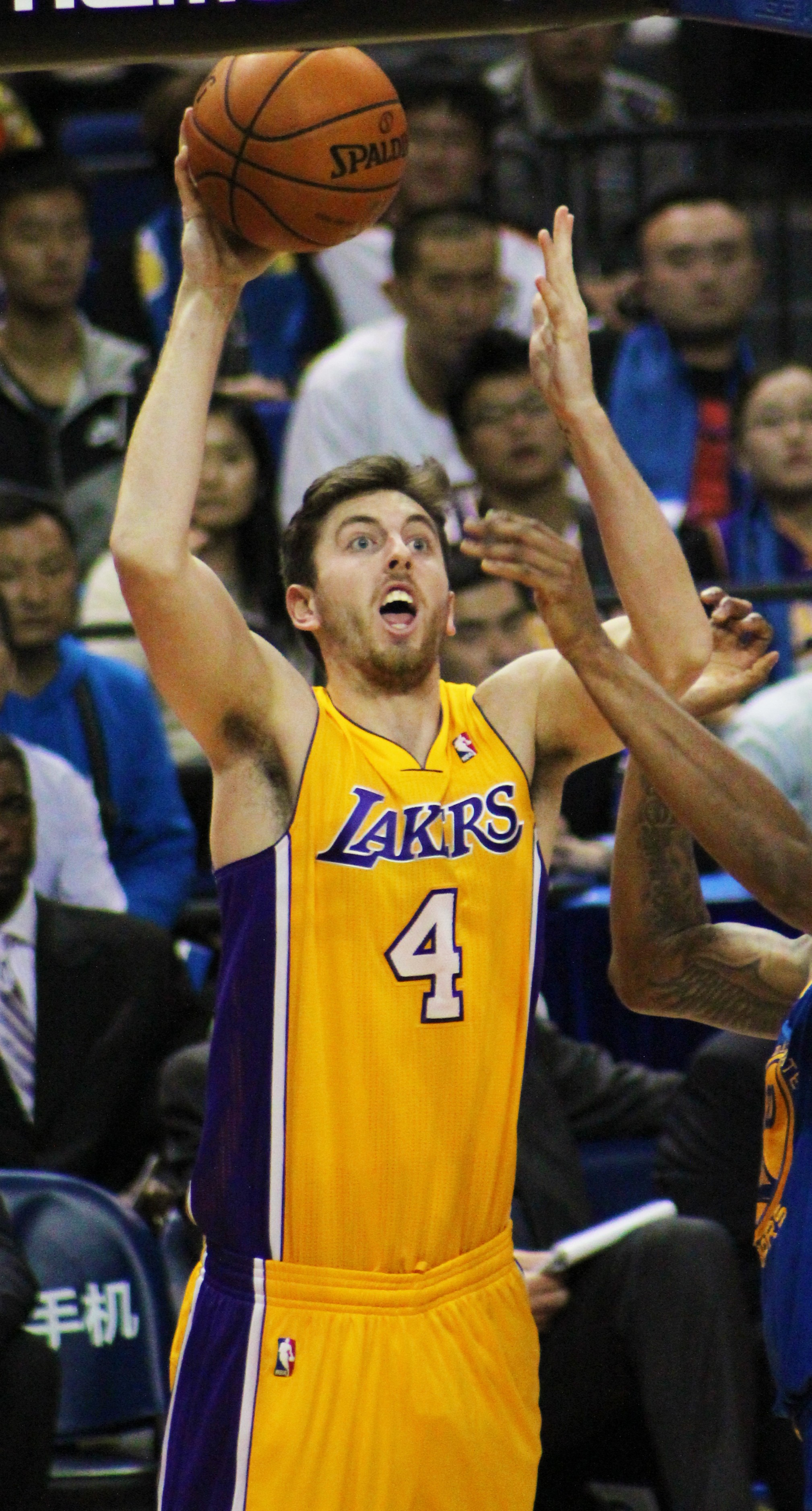
Kelly with the Lakers in 2013

Kelly was selected by the Los Angeles Lakers with the 48th overall pick in the 2013 NBA draft. On September 20, 2013, he signed with the Lakers. During his rookie season, he had multiple assignments with the Los Angeles D-Fenders of the NBA Development League. On February 5, 2014, he scored a career-high 26 points in a 119–108 win over the Cleveland Cavaliers.

On June 29, 2014, the Lakers tendered a $1 million qualifying offer to make Kelly a restricted free agent. On July 21, 2014, Kelly re-signed with the Lakers to a two-year deal. On January 30, 2015, he was reassigned to the D-Fenders, only to be recalled the next day.

During the 2015–16 season, Kelly received multiple assignments to the Los Angeles D-Fenders.

=== Atlanta Hawks and Maine Red Claws (2016–2017) ===
On September 20, 2016, Kelly signed with the Atlanta Hawks. However, he was waived by the Hawks on October 19 after appearing in six preseason games. He went on to sign with the Boston Celtics on October 21, but was waived the following day. He later re-signed with the Hawks on October 31. On January 6, 2017, he was waived by the Hawks after appearing in nine games. On January 13, 2017, Kelly was acquired by the Maine Red Claws of the NBA Development League. On February 24, 2017, Kelly returned to the Hawks after signing a multi-year contract with the team.

On June 28, 2017, Kelly was traded to the Houston Rockets in exchange for cash considerations. He was later waived on July 7, 2017; the Rockets made the move before his $1.5 million contract for 2017–18 became guaranteed.

=== Spain (2017–2018) ===
On September 12, 2017, Kelly signed with Real Betis Energía Plus of the Spanish Liga ACB.

=== Japan (2018–present) ===
In 2018, Kelly signed with the Sun Rockers Shibuya of the Japanese B.League. He played for them through the 2023–24 season.

In 2024, Kelly signed with the Fukui Blowinds of the Japanese B.League.

== Career statistics ==
Legend
GP	Games played	GS	Games started	MPG	Minutes per game
FG%	Field goal percentage	3P%	3-point field goal percentage	FT%	Free throw percentage
RPG	Rebounds per game	APG	Assists per game	SPG	Steals per game
BPG	Blocks per game	PPG	Points per game	**Bold**	Career high

=== NBA ===
==== Regular season ====
Year	Team	GP	GS	MPG	FG%	3P%	FT%	RPG	APG	SPG	BPG	PPG
2013–14	L.A. Lakers	**59**	25	22.2	**.423**	.338	.815	**3.7**	1.6	.5	**.8**	**8.0**
2014–15	L.A. Lakers	54	**32**	**23.7**	.337	.336	.832	2.8	**1.8**	**.6**	.5	6.4
2015–16	L.A. Lakers	36	0	13.1	.369	.135	.685	3.4	.6	.4	.3	4.2
2016–17	Atlanta	9	0	5.2	.300	**.400**	**1.000**	1.1	.6	.4	.2	1.1
Career		156	59	19.6	.380	.314	.797	3.2	1.4	.5	.5	6.2

=== College ===
Year	Team	GP	GS	MPG	FG%	3P%	FT%	RPG	APG	SPG	BPG	PPG
2009–10	Duke	35	0	6.5	.356	.263	.667	1.1	.4	.2	.4	1.2
2010–11	Duke	**37**	**27**	20.1	**.516**	.319	.805	3.7	.8	.7	1.4	6.6
2011–12	Duke	31	19	25.9	.444	.408	.807	**5.4**	1.1	**.8**	1.0	11.8
2012–13	Duke	23	23	**28.9**	.453	**.422**	**.812**	5.3	**1.7**	.7	**1.6**	**12.9**
**Career**		126	69	19.3	.460	.379	.805	3.7	.9	.6	1.1	7.5

== Personal life ==
Kelly is the son of Chris and Doreen Kelly. His father played basketball at Yale University, and his mother played volleyball at the University of Pennsylvania. He is married to Lindsay Cowher, the daughter of former NFL player and coach, Bill Cowher. His younger brother, Sean, joined the Duke Blue Devils in July 2014 as a walk-on for the 2014–15 season. Through his marriage, Kelly is the brother-in-law of former Los Angeles Kings forward Kevin Westgarth.
