= Abdul Gaddy =

American basketball player (born 1992)

Personal information
- Born: January 26, 1992 (age 34) Tacoma, Washington, U.S.
- Listed height: 6 ft 3 in (1.91 m)
- Listed weight: 195 lb (88 kg)

Career information
- High school: Bellarmine Prep (Tacoma, Washington)
- College: Washington (2009–2013)
- NBA draft: 2013: undrafted
- Playing career: 2013–2024
- Position: Point guard

Career history
- 2013–2014: Maine Red Claws
- 2014–2016: Virtus Bologna
- 2016–2017: VEF Riga
- 2017–2018: s.Oliver Würzburg
- 2018–2020: Oklahoma City Blue
- 2020: Peristeri
- 2020–2021: Bnei Herzliya
- 2021–2022: Promitheas Patras
- 2022–2024: Oklahoma City Blue
- 2024: Oradea

Career highlights
- LBL champion (2017); McDonald's All-American (2009); Second-team Parade All-American (2009)
- Stats at NBA.com
- Stats at Basketball Reference
Medals
Men's basketball
Representing the United States
FIBA Americas U18 Championship
Gold medal – first place	2010 San Antonio	Team

Abdul Gaddy Jr. (born January 26, 1992) is an American former professional basketball player He played college basketball for the Washington Huskies.

== College career ==
Gaddy was a highly sought after recruit for Washington: he was ranked the No. 2 point guard in the class by ESPN behind John Wall and was a McDonald's All-American in 2009. His collegiate career got off to a slow start as a backup to Venoy Overton and Isaiah Thomas. As a sophomore, he moved into the starting lineup and averaged 8.5 points and 3.8 assists before an ACL tear in January 2011 ended his season. Gaddy improved those numbers to 8.1 points and 5.2 assists as a junior. He led the Huskies to two NCAA tournament berths. As a senior, he averaged 11 points and 3 rebounds per game.

== Professional career ==
After going undrafted in the 2013 NBA draft, Gaddy joined the Charlotte Bobcats for the 2013 NBA Summer League. On September 23, 2013, he signed with the Bobcats, but he was later waived on October 10. On November 1, 2013, he was selected by the Iowa Energy in the second round of the 2013 NBA Development League Draft. His rights were then traded to the Santa Cruz Warriors on November 5, and then the Maine Red Claws on November 6. In 46 games for Maine in the 2013–14 season, he posted averages of 9.0 points, 5.0 assists and 3.2 rebounds per game, while shooting .420 from three-point range. He had the fourth triple double in Red Claws history on March 2 when he recorded 23 points, 11 assists and 10 rebounds against the Austin Toros.

Gaddy joined the New Orleans Pelicans for the 2014 NBA Summer League and averaged 5.2 points and 3.2 assists in five games. On July 30, 2014, he signed with Italian team Virtus Bologna for the 2014–15 season. In 33 games for Virtus, he averaged 7.3 points, 3.0 rebounds and 3.7 assists per game. On May 26, 2015, he signed a two-year contract extension with the club.

Following the 2016–17 campaign where he won the Latvian championship and made the VTB League playoffs with VEF Riga, Gaddy signed with s.Oliver Würzburg of the German Basketball Bundesliga. He averaged 8.1 points, 4.6 assists, 2.5 rebounds and 0.92 steals per game, shooting 48.1 percent from the field.

On September 23, 2018, Gaddy signed with the Oklahoma City Thunder. After playing in four preseason games, Gaddy was waived on October 12. Gaddy was added to the Oklahoma City Blue training camp roster on October 23, 2018. Gaddy joined the Orlando Magic for the 2019 Summer League and averaged 3 points and 3.25 assists in four games. On January 23, 2020, Gaddy registered 12 points, a G League season-high 20 assists, and 7 rebounds in a 144–140 loss to the Texas Legends. He missed three games in February and March 2020 due to a lower-body injury. Gaddy averaged 12.4 points, 9.0 assists and 3.3 rebounds per game during the 2019–20 season.

On July 1, 2020, Gaddy signed with Peristeri of the Greek Basket League. On December 16, 2020, Gaddy mutually parted ways with the Greek club. On December 16, 2020, Gaddy signed with Bnei Herzliya of the Israeli Basketball Premier League. He averaged 8.8 points and 5.4 assists per game. On July 16, 2021, Gaddy signed with EuroCup club Promitheas Patras, returning to Greece. On May 8, 2022, he was released from the Greek team, right before the start of the Greek Basket League playoffs.

=== Oklahoma City Blue (2022–2024) ===
Abdul Gaddy spent the 2022 NBA Summer League on the Oklahoma City Thunder roster. He was the 2nd oldest player on a summer league roster. On November 3, 2022, Gaddy was named to the opening night roster for the Oklahoma City Blue.

=== Oradea (2024) ===
On February 28, 2024, Gaddy signed with Oradea of the Liga Națională.

== National team career ==
In 2010, Gaddy was a member of USA Basketball's U18 team in the FIBA Americas tournament. He played a supporting role behind Kyrie Irving. In five games, Gaddy posted averages of 5.0 points and 2.8 assists in 13.4 minutes per game.
