= Pinewood Preparatory School =

Pinewood

Location
- 1114 Orangeburg Road; Summerville, South Carolina 29483; United States
- Coordinates: 33.024929°N 80.241718°W

Information
- Motto: Periculum, Veritas, Exploratio (Latin: Risk, Truth, Exploration)
- Established: 1952 (74 years ago)
- Founder: Henrietta Muckenfuss Allan
- Head of school: Daniel Seiden
- Faculty: 70
- Grades: K2–12
- Enrollment: 700
- Campus size: 43 acres (170,000 m^{2})
- Colors: Navy blue, Columbia blue, and white
- Athletics conference: Palmetto Association of Independent Schools, South Carolina Independent Schools Athletic Association (SCISAA)
- Team name: Panthers
- Rival: Porter-Gaud School; Northwood Academy
- Accreditation: SAIS, SACS
- Website: www.pinewoodprep.com

Founded in 1952, Pinewood Preparatory School is an independent, co-educational, college-preparatory day school located in Summerville, South Carolina, United States. It is jointly accredited by the Southern Association of Independent Schools and the Southern Association of Colleges and Schools. It holds membership in the Palmetto Association of Independent Schools and the South Carolina Independent Schools Athletic Association (SCISAA).

Pinewood admits academically qualified students without regard to race, creed, color, sex or national origin.

Pinewood is a member of the Network of Complementary Schools, a unique organization of 26 public and private schools, located in the United States, Canada, and Puerto Rico, which organizes and sponsors individual student exchanges among member schools. Each school in the network has a unique and unusual program or programs. Students who visit another network school have an opportunity to explore career options, focus on scientific disciplines, learn more about social institutions, pursue artistic interests, and learn about different lifestyles and cultures.

== History ==
Pinewood School was founded in 1952 by Henrietta M. Allan of Summerville. She served as Pinewood's Head of School for twenty years until her death in 1972. The original Pinewood campus was located on the grounds of the Historic Brokaw Mansion on South Main Street in the Summerville Historic District. For many years, the Pinewood campus was home to boarding students from New England and the Middle Atlantic states as well as local students from the Charleston area. During this time, Pinewood also owned and operated a summer school and camp in the Adirondack High Peaks near Lake Placid, New York. For its first 40 years, Pinewood was a kindergarten and primary school (K4-8) with a small ninth and tenth grade. After completing studies usually in either the eighth or tenth grade, Pinewood students transferred to Charleston area high schools or to other independent schools around the country.

After Allan's death, William E. McIntosh served as Head of School until 1980. From 1973 until 1977, Pinewood's student body grew from 184 students to 390 students. In 1980, Pinewood merged with The Summerville Academy and re-located to its present 43-acre (170,000 m^{2}) campus four miles (6.4 km) from downtown Summerville. Beginning in 1981, William S. Coursey, III, served as Head of School for fourteen years, a tenure second in length only to Henrietta Allan. During the Coursey era, the high school grades and athletic program were added and the school was renamed Pinewood Preparatory School.

=== Pinewood School ===
Henrietta Allan was born September 3, 1914, a daughter of Cantwell F. Muckenfuss and Vashti Daniel Muckenfuss, a school teacher. She was a graduate of Winthrop College with extensive postgraduate work at Columbia College, Cornell University, and Vassar College. In 1951, Allan contracted tuberculosis and went to the Will Rogers Institute in Saranac Lake, New York, to recover. During this time, she developed the idea of starting a school with her mother as a key member of the teaching staff. She and her husband Stephen Ford Allan of Summerville acquired the Brokaw Mansion and opened Pinewood School in 1952 with 52 students in grades 1–8.

In 1955, the first "graduating class" of the following eighth graders received their certificates: Elizabeth Barshay, Beryl Anne Lanneau, Andrea Niederhof, Mark H. Taylor Jr., Sandra Varney, Ellen Walker, and Mary Elizabeth Willis. In these days, Pinewood School "graduates" completed their high school education at local public and independent schools or they went off to boarding school. As it grew in numbers and reputation during the 1950s and 60s, Pinewood School added a pre-school, grades 9 and 10, a boarding department, and a summer school in the Adirondacks.

While pursuing graduate work each summer at Cornell, Allan became a pioneer in the study of children with high intelligence who were unable to fulfill their educational potential due to "perceptual problems" later more commonly known as Learning Disabilities. In 1970, she chartered a sister school, Reading Research, Inc., that operated next door to Pinewood for the next decade. Reading Research provided students with learning disabilities with small classes, close supervision, and a strategic curriculum designed to allow its students to transfer to Pinewood's college preparatory program.

When Mrs. Allan died of cancer in October 1972, Mr. Allan persuaded Summerville businessman Thomas W. Bailey and Charleston businessman Richardson M. Hanckel to organize Pinewood's first Board of Trustees. In April 1973, the new board named William E. McIntosh, who was then dean of students at nearby Trident Technical College, as Pinewood's second Head of School.

=== Summerville Academy ===
In 1968, a small group of local residents was banding together to start another independent school in Summerville. The prime movers in launching the new school were J. Taliaferro Taylor, III, M.D., a family physician, and James D. Martin, a lumber company president. Their goal was to form a school that would offer college preparatory curriculum through 12th grade plus athletics and other extracurricular activities not available at Pinewood School. The Summerville Academy opened in 1969 in the old Miles house across from Azalea Park on South Main Street with 51 students in grades 1–9. Hillyer Rudisill, III served as founding headmaster. He had an A.B. degree from Swarthmore College and an M.A. from the University of South Carolina, and had been the founding headmaster of Charleston Collegiate School, then known as Sea Island Academy, and of St. John's Christian Academy, then known as Lord Berkeley Academy.

As the academy began to outgrow its house on South Main Street, Hillyer Rudisill began looking for land to construct a new campus. He convinced the Board to purchase a 27-acre (110,000 m^{2}) farm on Old Orangeburg Road four miles (6.4 km) northwest of Summerville. In 1974, The academy opened its doors on its new campus which now serves as the heart of Pinewood Preparatory School's 43-acre (170,000 m^{2}) campus.

=== Heads of School ===
Pinewood School (1952–1980)	The Summerville Academy (1969–1980)	Pinewood Preparatory School
Henrietta Muckenfuss Allan (1952–1972); William E. McIntosh Jr. (1973–1980)	Hillyer Rudisill, III (1969–1977); Col. David R. Longacre (1977–1980)	Cabell C. Heyward (1980–1981); William S. Coursey, III (1981–1995); William M. Reeves Jr. (1995–1997); Glyn Cowlishaw, Ed.D. (1997–2011); Dr. Carolyn R. Baechtle, Ed.D. (interim, 2011–2012); Stephen M. Mandell (2012–2018); Dr. Daniel Seiden (2018–present)

=== Trustee Board Chairs ===
Pinewood School (1952–1980)	The Summerville Academy (1969–1980)	Pinewood Preparatory School
Richardson M. Hanckel (1972–75); Thomas Waring Bailey (1975–79); W. David Price, M.D. (1979–80)	J. Taliaferro Taylor, III, M.D. (1969–80)	W. David Price, M.D. (Co-chair, 1980–81); J. Taliaferro Taylor, III, M.D. (Co-chair, 1980–81); Rutherford P.C. Smith (1981–82 and 1987–88); Ronald L. Strawn (1982–83); Frances C. Welch, Ph.D. (1983–84); Wayne L. Phillips (1984–85); James R. Muscott, D.M.D. (1985–87); C. Dennis McKittrick (1988–91); J. Harry Robbins (1991–94); William B. Sheldon, M.D. (1994–96); Stephen F. Hutchinson (1996–97); George F. Milner (1997–2002); W. Kenneth Gibbs (2002–2006); Roy E. Strickland (2006–2009); James E. Mann, Ph.D. (2009–2013); Lisa S. Grossman (2013–2015); Don E. Kassing (2015–2017); Carolyn R. Baechtle, Ed.D. (2017–present)

== Athletics ==
In 2005, 2006, 2009 and 2010, Pinewood was awarded the James C. Williams Jr. President's Cup by SCISAA for fielding the best overall athletic program among South Carolina independent schools. In recent years, the Panthers have won SCISAA championships in baseball (2009 and 2012), boys' basketball (2006, 2007, 2008, 2009 and 2010), girls' basketball (2009, 2011, 2012 and 2013), competition cheer (2007, 2008, 2012 and 2013), boys' cross country (2014), girls' cross country (2012, 2013 and 2014), boys' golf (2006, 2008, 2009, 2010 and 2011), girls' golf (2010, 2011, 2012 and 2013), boys' soccer (2004, 2005, 2006, 2007, 2008, 2009 and 2010), girls' soccer (2009, 2010, 2014 and 2015), speed and strength (2005, 2010, 2012 and 2015), sporting clays (2013, 2016), boys' swimming (2004), girls' swimming (2005 and 2006) and boys' tennis (2007). Pinewood also fields competitive teams in football, volleyball, wrestling, girls' lacrosse, girls' tennis, and equestrian.

=== SCISA Championship Teams ===
- Boys' basketball

1993, 1997, 1998, 2006, 2007, 2008, 2009, 2010, 2026

- Boys' soccer

2004, 2005, 2006, 2007, 2008, 2009, 2010

- Boys' golf

2006, 2008, 2009, 2010, 2011

- Baseball

2009, 2012

- Boys' swimming

2003, 2004

- Boys' tennis

1993, 2007

- Boys' cross country

2014

- Competition cheer

2007, 2008, 2012, 2013, 2015

- Football

2024, 2025

- Girls' basketball

2009, 2011, 2012, 2013

- Girls' cross country

2011, 2013, 2014

- Girls' golf

2010, 2011, 2012, 2013

- Girls' soccer

2009, 2010, 2014, 2015

- Girls' swimming

2003, 2005, 2006

- Speed and strength

2005, 2010, 2012, 2015

- Sporting clays

2013, 2016

- Volleyball

1992,1994, 2003

== Notable alumni ==
- Chuck Eidson, professional basketball player
- Milton Jennings, professional basketball player
- Jalen Slawson, professional basketball player
- Ryan Steed, professional football player
