= Mason Plumlee =

American basketball player (born 1990)

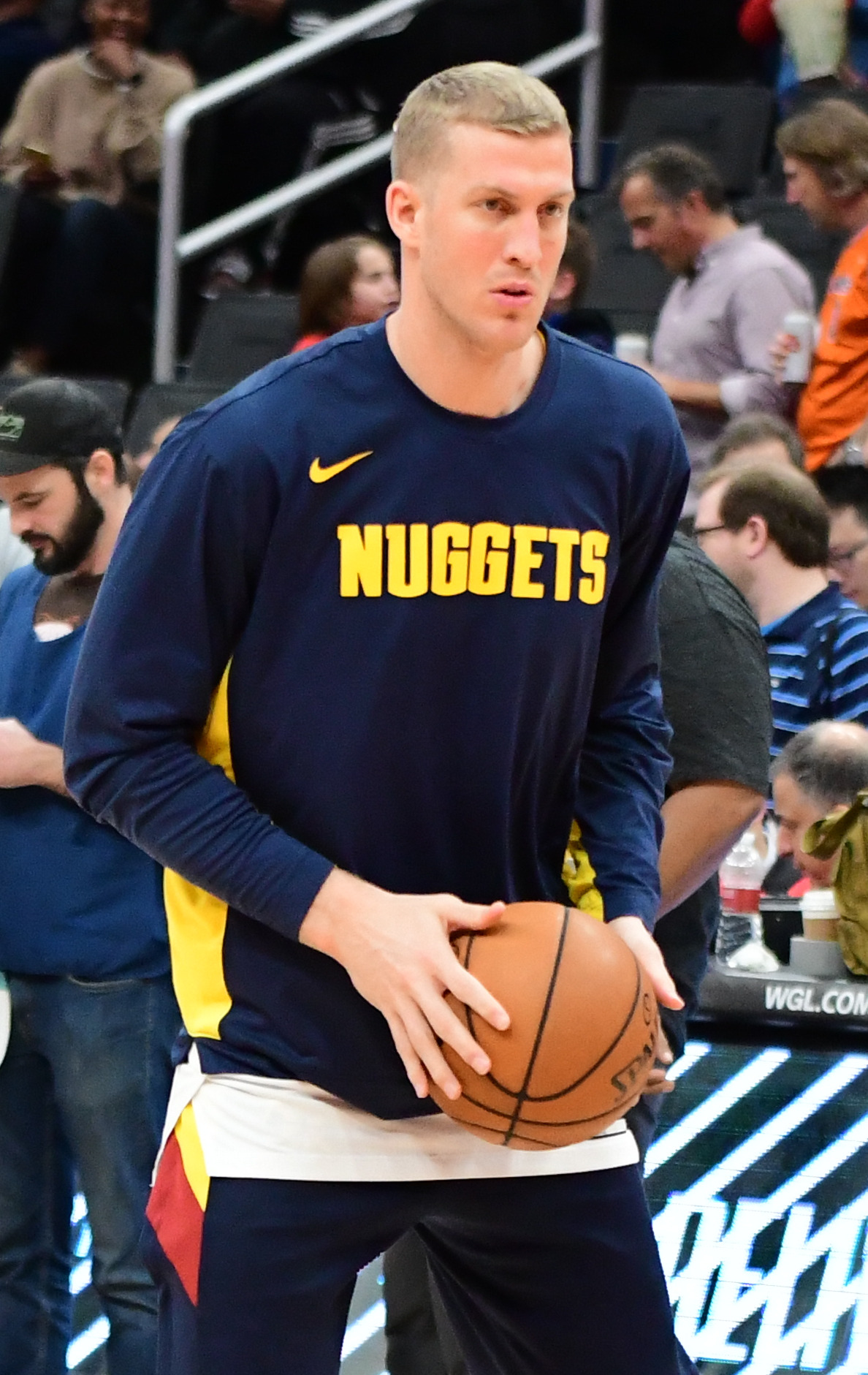
- Plumlee with the Denver Nuggets in 2020

No. 24 – Sacramento Kings
- Position: Center
- League: NBA

Personal information
- Born: March 5, 1990 (age 36) Fort Wayne, Indiana, U.S.
- Listed height: 7 ft 0 in (2.13 m)
- Listed weight: 254 lb (115 kg)

Career information
- High school: Warsaw Community (Warsaw, Indiana); Christ School (Arden, North Carolina)
- College: Duke (2009–2013)
- NBA draft: 2013: 1st round, 22nd overall pick
- Drafted by: Brooklyn Nets
- Playing career: 2013–present

Career history
- 2013–2015: Brooklyn Nets
- 2015–2017: Portland Trail Blazers
- 2017–2020: Denver Nuggets
- 2020–2021: Detroit Pistons
- 2021–2023: Charlotte Hornets
- 2023–2024: Los Angeles Clippers
- 2024: →Ontario Clippers
- 2024–2025: Phoenix Suns
- 2025–2026: Charlotte Hornets
- 2026: San Antonio Spurs
- 2026–present: Sacramento Kings

Career highlights
- NBA All-Rookie First Team (2014); NCAA champion (2010); Consensus second-team All-American (2013); Pete Newell Big Man Award (2013); First-team All-ACC (2013); Third-team All-ACC (2012); McDonald's All-American (2009); Third-team Parade All-American (2009); North Carolina Mr. Basketball (2009)
- Stats at NBA.com
- Stats at Basketball Reference
Medals
Men's basketball
Representing United States
World Cup
Gold medal – first place	2014 Spain	Team
FIBA Americas U18 Championship
Silver medal – second place	2008 Argentina	Team

Mason Alexander Plumlee (born March 5, 1990), nicknamed "Plumdog Millionaire", is an American professional basketball player for the Sacramento Kings of the National Basketball Association (NBA). He primarily plays the center position. As a freshman in 2009–10, he was a back-up forward for the Duke Blue Devils national championship team, playing with his older brother Miles. He was a 2009 McDonald's All-American in high school. During his senior year at Duke, he also played with his younger brother Marshall. He was selected with the 22nd overall pick by the Brooklyn Nets in the 2013 NBA draft. Plumlee was also a member of the United States national team that won a gold medal in the 2014 FIBA Basketball World Cup.

== High school career ==
Plumlee first attended Warsaw Community High School in Warsaw, Indiana, before transferring to Christ School in Arden, North Carolina, after his freshman year. At Christ School, Mason helped lead the team to three North Carolina High School Athletic Association state championships and a record of 99–8 over his last three years. He earned a silver medal with the 2008 USA U18 National Team at the FIBA Americas Under-18 Championship. Plumlee was named a 2009 McDonald's All-American as a senior after he averaged 15.3 points, 10.1 rebounds, 3.3 assists, and 2.5 blocks per game for the year, a Jordan Brand All-American, and a third-team Parade All-American and Slam All-American. He was named 2009 North Carolina Mr. Basketball by the Charlotte Observer, and was twice an All-State pick. In addition, he competed in the high jump in track and field, with an individual best jump of 6 feet 8 inches.

College recruiting
Name	Hometown	School	Height	Weight	Commit date
Mason Plumlee; PF/C	Warsaw, Indiana	Christ School (NC)	6 ft 10.5 in (2.10 m)	207.5 lb (94.1 kg)	Feb 27, 2008
Mason Plumlee; PF/C	Recruit ratings: Scout: Rivals: (98)				
Overall recruit ranking: Scout: 6 (PF) Rivals: 55, 14 (PF) ESPN: 10, 2 (C)
Note: In many cases, Scout, Rivals, 247Sports, On3, and ESPN may conflict in their listings of height and weight.; In these cases, the average was taken. ESPN grades are on a 100-point scale.; Sources: "Duke Basketball Commitments". Rivals.; "2009 Duke Basketball Commits". Scout.; "ESPN". ESPN.; "Scout.com Team Recruiting Rankings". Scout.; "2009 Team Ranking". Rivals.

== College career ==
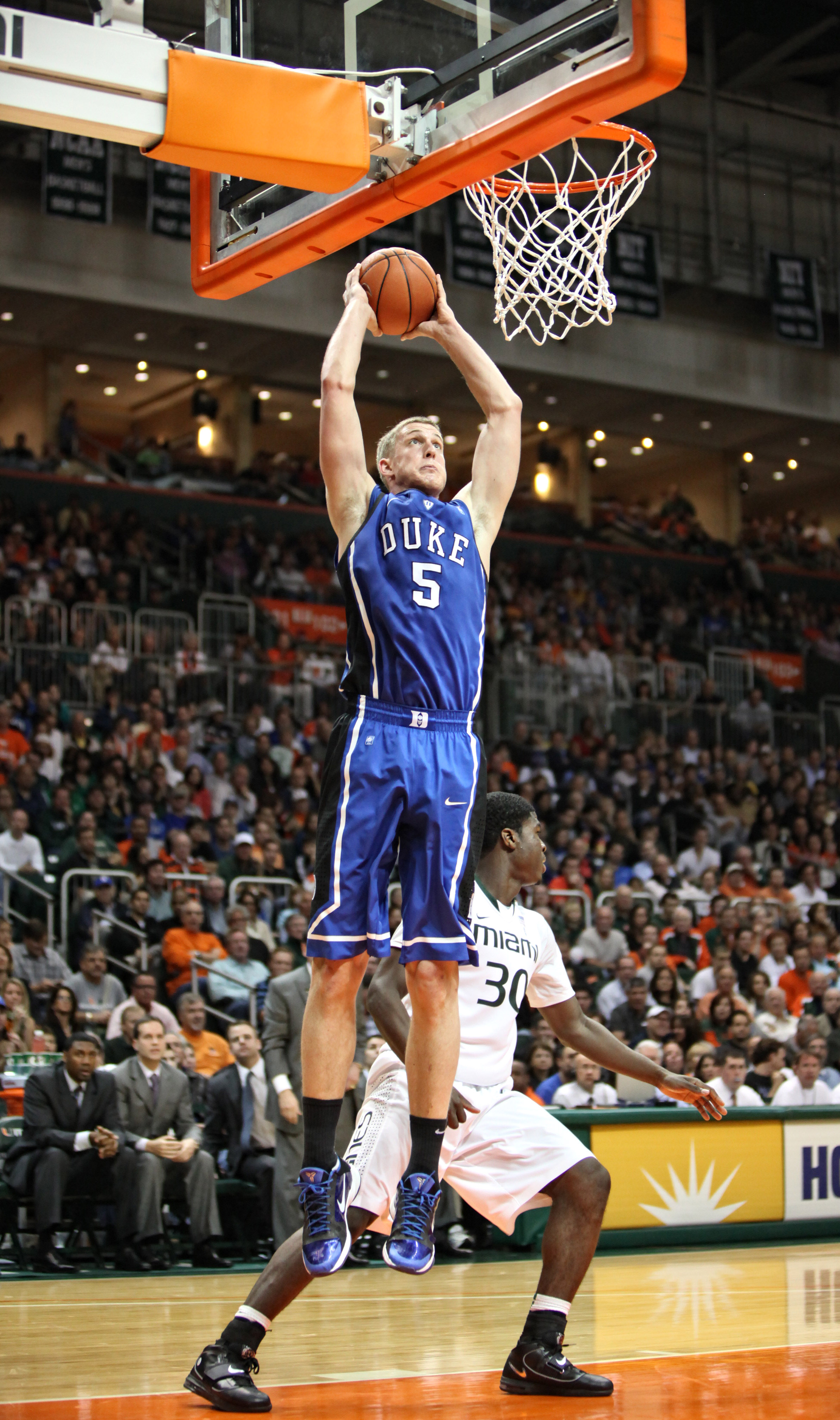
Plumlee going up for a dunk for Duke in 2011

His brother Miles had originally committed to play at Stanford, but chose to follow him to Duke after Stanford coach Trent Johnson left for LSU.

He missed the first six games of the 2009–10 season with a broken left wrist. He and Miles usually rotated into games together, replacing Brian Zoubek and Lance Thomas, and were often the first two players off the bench. Teammate Nolan Smith said: "He's an athlete. He can run and jump with the best of them in the country."

Through April 4, 2010, Mason was tied for first on the team in blocks, with 30, and second on the team with 21 dunks. In an average 14.1 minutes of play per game during the 2009–10 season, he averaged 3.1 rebounds and .9 blocks.

Coach Mike Krzyzewski said: "Mason has got a chance to be really, really good. He has skills of a guard and the body of a big man, and a great basketball mind. He's very competitive, he likes the stage, and he's comfortable with the ball."

It was anticipated that in 2010–11 the two brothers would both be in Duke's starting lineup. Georgia Tech coach Paul Hewitt viewed Mason as Duke's best pro prospect. Told in early April 2010 that some scouting services viewed him as the team's best pro prospect, Plumlee said: "I have seen that. I don't even really know what to say to those people. I mean, let's be real. I'm trying to play the best I can, but in reality nobody goes from the bench to the NBA. Come on."

Mason started 11 of the team's first 13 games in the 2010–2011 season, in 3 of which he recorded double doubles in points and rebounds. For the season, he averaged 7.5 points, 8 rebounds, and 1.5 blocks per game to help man the paint for the defending champion Blue Devils.

He was a 2012–13 first team Academic All-American selection. He was also a 2012–13 Senior CLASS Award finalist.

== Professional career ==
=== Brooklyn Nets (2013–2015) ===
==== 2013–14 season ====
Plumlee was selected with the 22nd overall pick by the Brooklyn Nets in the 2013 NBA draft. On July 3, 2013, he signed his rookie-scale contract with the Nets. On November 15, 2013, in his first game against his brother Miles and the Phoenix Suns, he recorded 7 points, 3 rebounds and 2 assists in a 100–98 overtime win. The following night, Plumlee played 26 minutes against the Los Angeles Clippers with both Brook Lopez and Kevin Garnett out injured, and had 19 points and 6 rebounds, both career highs. Plumlee was selected to play in the 2014 BBVA Rising Stars Challenge on Chris Webber's team, while his brother Miles was picked to play on Grant Hill's team. On February 9, 2014, Plumlee recorded his second NBA double-double, finishing with 22 points and 13 rebounds in a Nets victory. On March 17, 2014, both Miles and Mason Plumlee started for the Suns and the Nets, respectively. Mason had 14 points and 11 rebounds, while Miles had 3 points and 6 rebounds in a 108-95 Nets win.

On April 8, 2014, the Nets faced the two-time defending champion Miami Heat, looking to become the first team to sweep LeBron James in a four-game season series. With Kevin Garnett resting his back and Andray Blatche out with illness, Plumlee was the only active center on the Nets roster. The Nets held an 88–87 lead in the closing seconds when James attempted a dunk that would have won the game for the Heat. Plumlee blocked the shot and secured the season sweep in what the New York Times described as a signature moment in his career. Although James was visibly upset about the play, and claimed that he had been fouled, the NBA later announced that the call was correct and that the block was clean. In 70 games (22 starts), he averaged 7.4 points and 4.4 rebounds per game as he earned NBA All-Rookie first team honors, becoming the first Net since Brook Lopez (2008–09) to earn such honors.

==== 2014–15 season ====
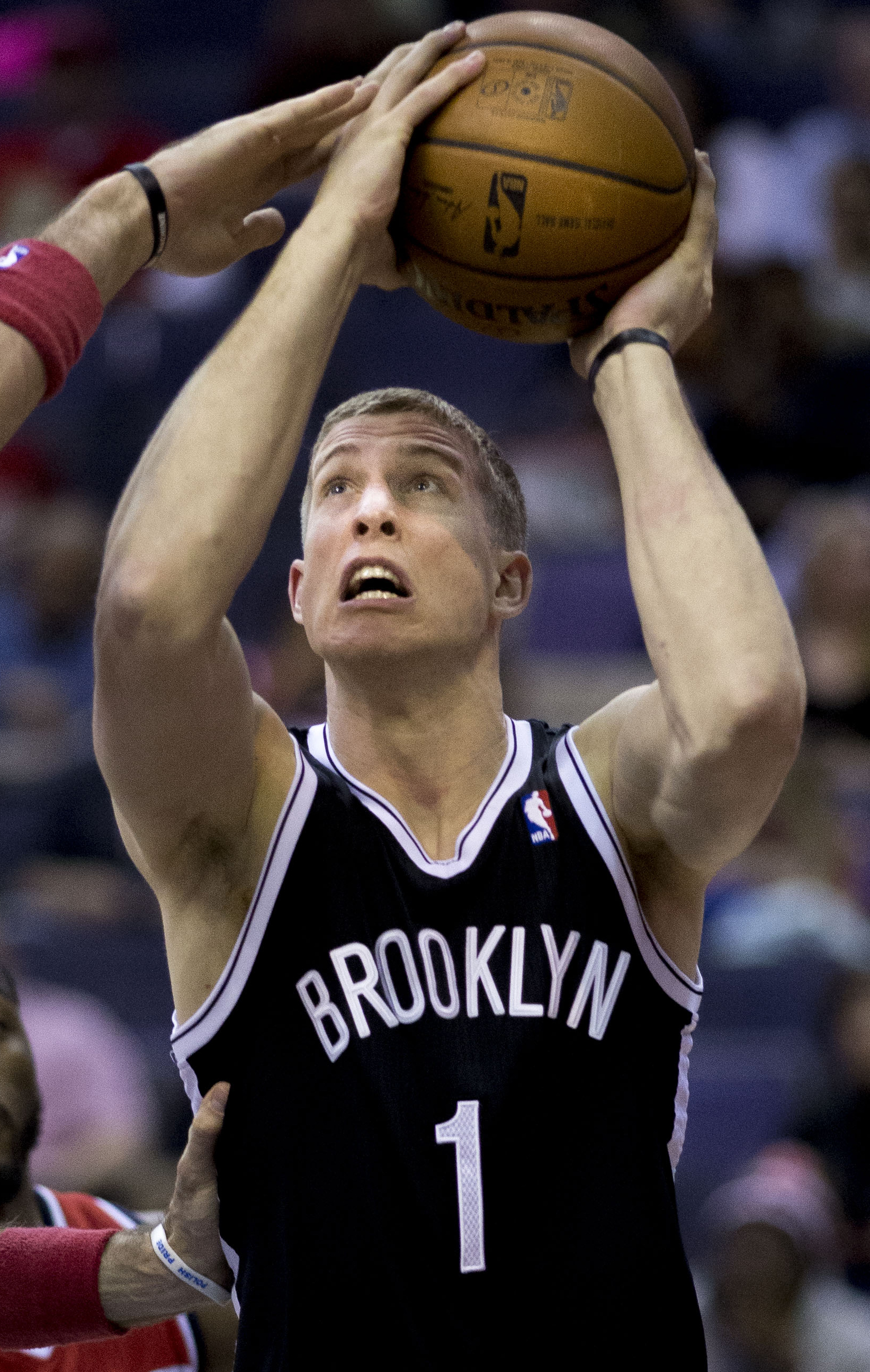
Plumlee with the Nets in 2014

Following the departure of Andray Blatche, Plumlee came into the season as the primary back-up to Brook Lopez. On October 24, 2014, the Nets exercised their third-year team option on Plumlee's rookie scale contract, extending the contract through the 2015–16 season.

After starting the first two games of the season in the absence of Lopez, Plumlee moved back to a bench role in the wake of Lopez's return until the starting center once again missed time during December, in which Plumlee was put back into the starting line-up. He subsequently scored a season-high 18 points and added 10 rebounds on December 12 in helping the Nets defeat the Philadelphia 76ers, 88–70. He surpassed his season high on December 23 with 19 points, while also grabbing a career-high 13 rebounds, in a 102–96 win over the Denver Nuggets. On January 12, 2015, he surpassed his season high again with a career-high 24 points in a 113–99 loss to the Houston Rockets.

=== Portland Trail Blazers (2015–2017) ===
On June 25, 2015, Plumlee was traded, along with the draft rights to Pat Connaughton, to the Portland Trail Blazers in exchange for Steve Blake and the draft rights to Rondae Hollis-Jefferson. On September 30, the Trail Blazers exercised their fourth-year team option on Plumlee's rookie-scale contract, extending the contract through the 2016–17 season. On December 14, he recorded 15 points, 13 rebounds and a then career-high six assists in a 105–101 win over the New Orleans Pelicans. On January 6, he scored a season-high 19 points in a loss to the Los Angeles Clippers. On January 18, he recorded his 12th double-double of the season with 10 points, 11 rebounds and a career-high seven assists in a 108–98 win over the Washington Wizards. On January 29, in a win over the Charlotte Hornets, Plumlee recorded 13 points and 12 rebounds for his career-high 13th double-double of the season. On March 20, he recorded 14 points and a then career-high 19 rebounds in a 132–120 overtime loss to the Dallas Mavericks.

In Game 3 of the Trail Blazers' 2016 first-round playoff series against the Los Angeles Clippers, Plumlee recorded career highs of 21 rebounds and nine assists in a 96–88 win. He became the first player with 19 or more rebounds and eight or more assists in a playoff game since LeBron James in 2010. He also became the first Blazer center with eight-plus assists in a postseason game since Arvydas Sabonis in 1999. In Game 4 of the series, Plumlee recorded 14 rebounds, 10 assists, three blocks and two points in a 98–84 win, tying the series at 2–2.

On December 7, 2016, in a loss to the Milwaukee Bucks, Plumlee became the fastest Portland player to tally 150 rebounds and 100 assists (23 games) since Scottie Pippen in 1999–2000 (22 games). On January 8, 2017, Plumlee recorded eight points, a career-high 12 assists, 10 rebounds, three blocks and one steal across 40 minutes in a 125–124 double-overtime loss to the Detroit Pistons. His 10 rebounds and 12 assists made him the first Blazers forward or center to have a double-double in those categories since Mychal Thompson in January 1984.

=== Denver Nuggets (2017–2020) ===
On February 13, 2017, Plumlee was traded, along with a 2018 second-round draft pick and cash considerations, to the Denver Nuggets in exchange for Jusuf Nurkić and a 2017 protected first-round pick.

On September 20, 2017, Plumlee re-signed with the Nuggets on a three-year, $41 million contract.

After the death of Kobe Bryant in January 2020, Plumlee decided to change his jersey number from 24 to 7 to honor Bryant, who wore the number 24 during the final ten seasons of his career. He then went on to play minutes off the bench while backing up MVP center Nikola Jokić in the 2020 bubble. The Nuggets would go on to reach the Western Conference Finals after becoming the first team to overcome multiple 3–1 series deficits in a single postseason, doing so against the Utah Jazz and Los Angeles Clippers in the First Round and Semi-Finals respectively, before Denver would end up losing to the eventual NBA champion Los Angeles Lakers in five games.

=== Detroit Pistons (2020–2021) ===
On December 1, 2020, Plumlee signed a three-year, $24.7 million contract with the Detroit Pistons. On February 14, 2021, he recorded his first career triple-double with 17 points 10 rebounds and 10 assists in a 123–112 victory over the New Orleans Pelicans. At 30 years and 346 days, he became the oldest player to record his first triple-double since Patrick Ewing at age 33 in 1996.

=== Charlotte Hornets (2021–2023) ===
On August 6, 2021, Plumlee and the draft rights to JT Thor were traded to the Charlotte Hornets in exchange for the draft rights to Balša Koprivica. Plumlee made his Hornets debut on October 20, recording eight points, ten rebounds and five assists in a 123–122 win over the Indiana Pacers. On December 27, he scored a season-high 15 points, alongside nine rebounds, three assists, two steals and three blocks, in a 123–99 win over the Houston Rockets.

On January 21, 2023, Plumlee scored a season-high 25 points, alongside eleven rebounds and two assists, in a 122–118 win over the Atlanta Hawks. During Plumlee's 2022–23 season with the Hornets as their starting center for the second straight year, he was averaging career highs in points (12.2) and rebounds (9.7) per game.

=== Los Angeles Clippers (2023–2024) ===
On February 9, 2023, Plumlee was traded to the Los Angeles Clippers in exchange for Reggie Jackson and a future second-round pick. As a member of the Clippers organization, Plumlee would join notable Clippers players Russell Westbrook, Kawhi Leonard, Paul George, and coach Tyronn Lue. Plumlee made his Clippers debut on February 14, recording eight points, five rebounds and three assists, in a 134–124 win over the Golden State Warriors.

On July 7, 2023, Plumlee re-signed with the Los Angeles Clippers on a one-year, $5 million contract.

=== Phoenix Suns (2024–2025) ===
On July 5, 2024, Plumlee signed a minimum deal with the Phoenix Suns. With the Suns sitting at 15–18 to begin the 2025 part of their 2024–25 campaign, the Suns elected to move Plumlee into their starting lineup in place of Jusuf Nurkić, beginning in their January 6, 2025 game against the Philadelphia 76ers.

=== Return to Charlotte (2025–2026) ===
On July 13, 2025, Plumlee signed a minimum contract with the Charlotte Hornets, returning to the franchise for a second stint. His return to Charlotte saw him appear in just 14 games, averaging 1.9 points, 2.9 rebounds, and 1.1 assists. On December 31, it was announced that Plumlee would miss at least six weeks after undergoing surgery to address a right groin injury.

On February 4, 2026, Plumlee was traded to the Oklahoma City Thunder, in exchange for Ousmane Dieng and a 2029 second-round pick, but was waived by the team the same day.

=== San Antonio Spurs (2026) ===
On February 17, 2026, Plumlee signed a 10-day contract with the San Antonio Spurs. On February 28, Plumlee signed a rest-of-season contract with San Antonio.

=== Sacramento Kings (2026–present) ===
On November 11, 2026, Plumlee signed with the Sacramento Kings.

== National team career ==
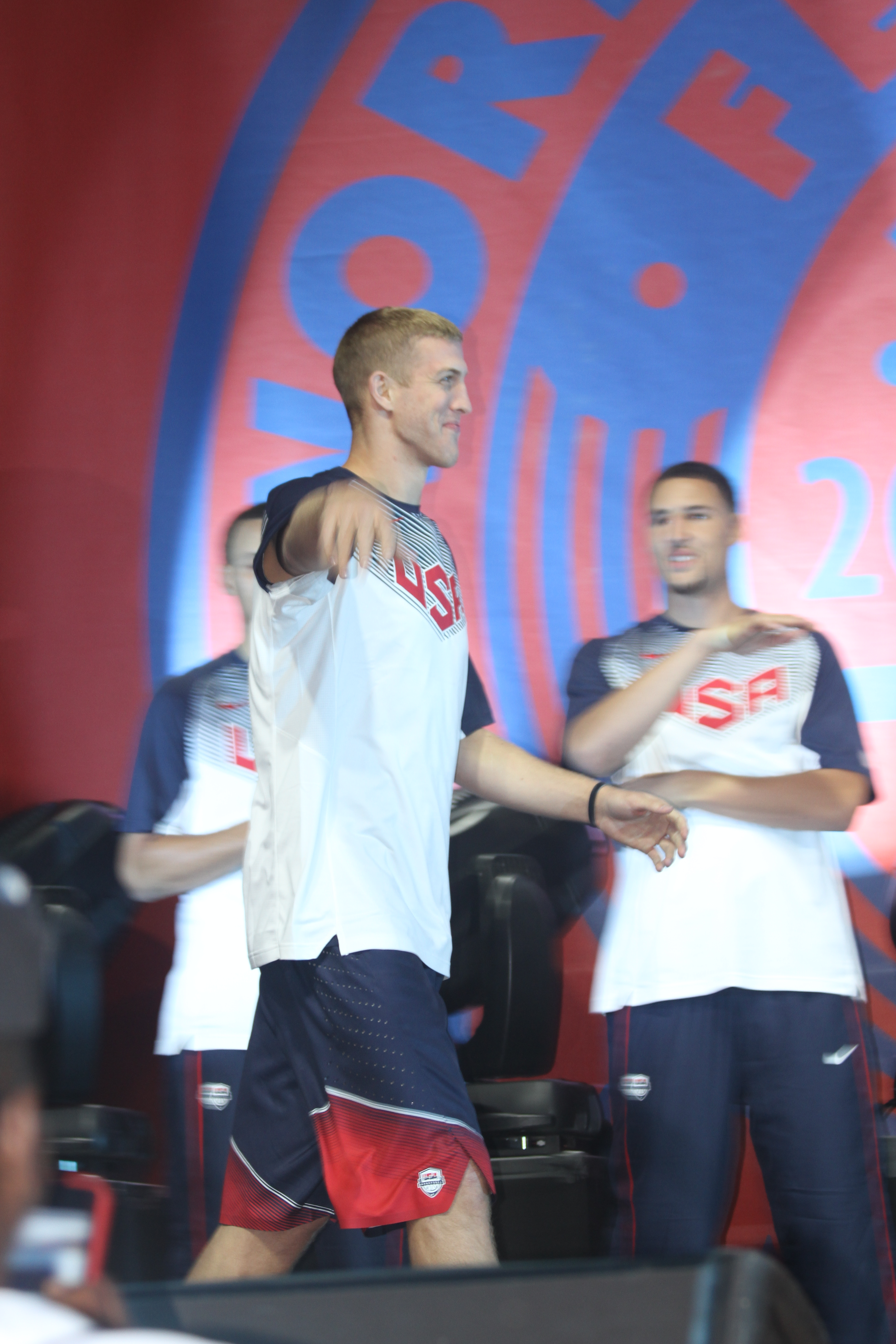
Plumlee with Team USA at the 2014 World Basketball Festival

Plumlee was a member of the United States national team that won the gold medal in the 2014 FIBA Basketball World Cup. He also won silver with the Under-18 team at the FIBA Americas Under-18 Championship in 2008.

== Career statistics ==
Legend
GP	Games played	GS	Games started	MPG	Minutes per game
FG%	Field goal percentage	3P%	3-point field goal percentage	FT%	Free throw percentage
RPG	Rebounds per game	APG	Assists per game	SPG	Steals per game
BPG	Blocks per game	PPG	Points per game	**Bold**	Career high
*	Led the league

=== NBA ===
==== Regular season ====
Year	Team	GP	GS	MPG	FG%	3P%	FT%	RPG	APG	SPG	BPG	PPG
2013–14	Brooklyn	70	22	18.2	.659	.000	.626	4.4	.9	.7	.8	7.4
2014–15	Brooklyn	**82**	45	21.3	.573	.000	.495	6.2	.9	.8	.8	8.7
2015–16	Portland	**82***	**82***	25.4	.516	.000	.642	7.7	2.8	.8	1.0	9.1
2016–17	Portland	54	54	28.1	.532	.000	.567	8.0	**4.0**	**.9**	**1.2**	11.1
2016–17	Denver	27	10	23.4	.547	.000	.618	6.4	2.6	.7	1.1	9.1
2017–18	Denver	74	26	19.5	.601	.000	.456	5.4	1.9	.7	1.1	7.1
2018–19	Denver	**82***	17	21.1	.593	**.200**	.561	6.4	3.0	.8	.9	7.8
2019–20	Denver	61	1	17.3	.615	.000	.535	5.2	2.5	.5	.6	7.2
2020–21	Detroit	56	56	26.8	.614	.000	.669	9.3	3.6	.8	.9	10.4
2021–22	Charlotte	73	73	24.6	.641	.000	.392	7.7	3.1	.8	.7	6.5
2022–23	Charlotte	56	56	**28.5**	.669	—	.605	**9.7**	3.7	.6	.6	**12.2**
2022–23	L.A. Clippers	23	4	19.9	.727	—	**.772**	6.9	1.7	.5	.5	7.5
2023–24	L.A. Clippers	46	11	14.7	.569	.000	.707	5.1	1.2	.3	.4	5.3
2024–25	Phoenix	74	21	17.6	.619	.000	.648	6.1	1.8	.4	.6	4.5
2025–26	Charlotte	14	2	8.9	.750	—	.667	2.9	1.1	.4	.0	1.9
2025–26	San Antonio	6	1	7.8	**1.000**	—	.500	2.2	.7	.7	.0	.8
Career		880	481	21.6	.596	.039	.577	6.6	2.3	.7	.8	7.9

==== Playoffs ====
Year	Team	GP	GS	MPG	FG%	3P%	FT%	RPG	APG	SPG	BPG	PPG
2014	Brooklyn	10	0	11.4	.438	—	.444	2.3	.2	.3	.7	2.2
2015	Brooklyn	6	0	8.2	.667	—	.364	1.3	.3	**.7**	.3	2.0
2016	Portland	11	**11**	**27.8**	.400	—	.636	**11.8**	**4.8**	.6	**1.0**	7.0
2019	Denver	14	0	15.6	.511	.000	.571	4.4	1.5	.5	.7	4.6
2020	Denver	**19**	0	10.9	.487	.000	.667	3.2	1.3	.2	.4	2.4
2023	L.A. Clippers	5	0	18.2	**.875**	—	**.929**	6.8	1.8	.4	.4	**8.2**
2024	L.A. Clippers	6	0	11.0	.389	—	.625	3.3	.7	.5	.3	3.2
2026	San Antonio	6	0	3.0	.667	—	—	.7	.3	.0	.5	.7
Career		77	11	13.9	.488	.000	.605	4.4	1.5	.4	.6	3.7

=== College ===
Year	Team	GP	GS	MPG	FG%	3P%	FT%	RPG	APG	SPG	BPG	PPG
2009–10	Duke	34	1	14.1	.462	**.250**	.543	3.1	.9	.5	.9	3.7
2010–11	Duke	**37**	31	25.9	.589	.000	.441	8.5	1.5	.9	**1.7**	7.2
2011–12	Duke	34	31	28.4	.572	—	.528	9.2	1.6	.8	1.6	11.1
2012–13	Duke	36	**36**	**34.7**	**.599**	—	**.681**	**9.9**	**1.9**	**1.0**	1.4	**17.1**
Career		141	99	25.9	.574	.200	.583	7.7	1.5	.8	.4	9.8

== Personal life ==
Plumlee grew up with brothers Miles, who also played for Duke and is a former professional basketball player, Marshall who also played for Duke and is a former professional basketball player, and sister Madeleine who played volleyball for the University of Notre Dame. He and Miles became the sixth pair of brothers to play at Duke at the same time. With Marshall's NCAA championship in 2015, all three Plumlee brothers won NCAA championships playing for Duke.

Plumlee's parents are Perky, a former Tennessee Tech basketball player, and Leslie (née Schultz), a former Purdue basketball player. The two met at a basketball camp during the summer of 1979. His grandfather Albert "Bud" Schultz played basketball at Michigan Tech (1944), his uncle William Schultz played basketball at Wisconsin-Eau Claire (1971–72), and his uncle Chad Schultz played basketball at Wisconsin-Oshkosh (1983–86).

Plumlee is a Christian, and stated about his beliefs, "I think, really, that's the point of my story, that you have to walk by faith and not by sight. You can't see the supernatural and what God has planned."

== See also ==
- List of NBA career field goal percentage leaders
- List of All-Atlantic Coast Conference men's basketball teams
