= ESPN HS =

Former monthly sports magazine

ESPN HS (2011-2012) RISE (2006-2011) SchoolSports (1997-2006)
- Categories: Sports
- Frequency: Monthly
- Total circulation (2011): 1,005,422
- Founded: 1997
- Final issue: September 2012
- Company: ESPN
- Country: United States
- Based in: Boston
- Language: English
- Website: espn.go.com/high-school/

Cover of magazine when it was titled RISE

Cover of magazine when it was titled SchoolSports

ESPN HS was a high school sports magazine published monthly during the school year in 25 markets around the United States. Founded as SchoolSports magazine in 1997, the publication changed its name to RISE in 2006 and was purchased by ESPN in January 2008. In 2011, the magazine's title was changed to ESPN HS.

The magazine ceased publication in September 2012 after ESPN decided to close its high school sports unit.

== History ==
Sensing the high school sports market was being undercovered by local newspapers and television stations, SchoolSports was founded in 1997 in the Greater Boston area. In addition to being one of the first publications dedicated to covering high school sports, SchoolSports also gave student-athletes a voice by allowing them to submit articles for publication in the SchoolBeat section. The magazine's distribution model was also unique, as the publication was sent directly to area high schools free of charge.

Over the next 10 years, the magazine expanded to 25 markets and was published in Boston, New York, Los Angeles, Chicago, Philadelphia, San Francisco, Dallas/Ft. Worth, Washington D.C., Atlanta, Miami, Detroit, Houston, Colorado, Arizona, Seattle, Pittsburgh, Cincinnati, Cleveland, Central Florida, St. Louis, Minnesota, Oregon, San Antonio/Austin, Indiana and New Jersey. All told, the magazine had a peak monthly circulation of more than 1,000,000.

In conjunction with the magazine's 10th year of publication in 2006–07, the name was changed from SchoolSports to RISE to reflect its emergence as the nation's leading teen lifestyle magazine in addition to its top-notch prep sports coverage.

The magazine's name was changed again to ESPN HS in 2011, but that name lasted only one year before the publication was discontinued.

== Other Ventures ==
In the summer of 2006, RISE first put on a groundbreaking high school basketball showcase called the Elite 24. The game brought together the nation's top 24 high school basketball players, regardless of school year, for a game at Harlem's historic Rucker Park. The game's official name is the Boost Mobile Elite 24 Hoops Classic.

Beginning during the 2006–07 school year, RISE teamed with Gatorade to continue Gatorade's long-standing Player of the Year program.

Beginning during the 2007–08 school year, RISE began publishing GIRL, a first-of-its-kind magazine dedicated solely to girls' high school athletics. Now-WNBA star Elena Delle Donne, then attending and playing for Ursuline Academy in Delaware, was the first cover subject of GIRL in the fall of 2007.
