= Game 6 of the 1998 NBA Finals =

Basketball game on June 14, 1998

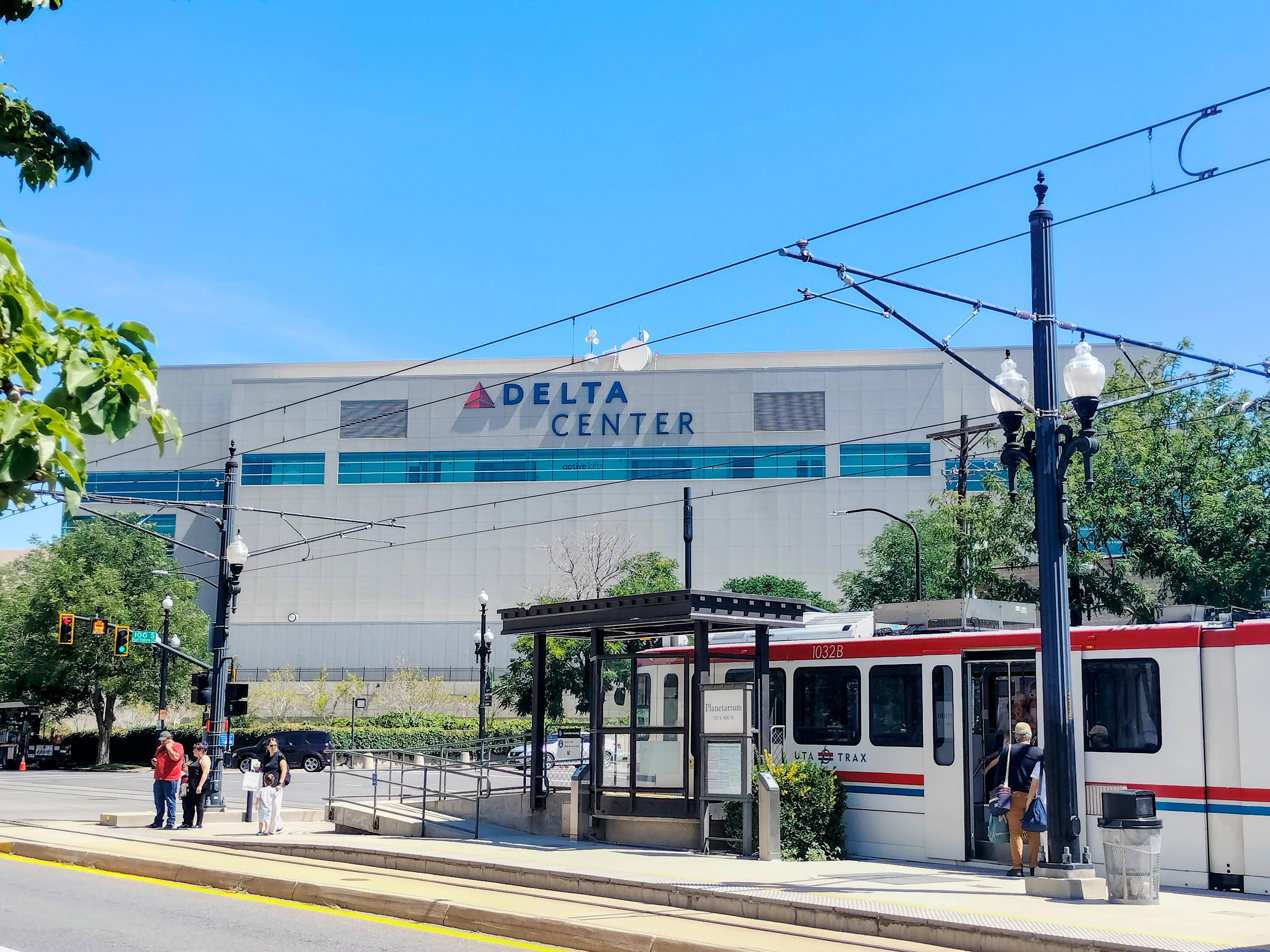
- Exterior of the Delta Center in 2023, where the game was held.
Chicago Bulls	Utah Jazz
87	86
Head coach: Phil Jackson	Head coach: Jerry Sloan
	1	2	3	4	Total
Chicago Bulls	22	23	16	26	87
Utah Jazz	25	24	17	20	86
- Date: June 14, 1998
- Venue: Delta Center, Salt Lake City, Utah
- Referees: Dick Bavetta, Hue Hollins, Danny Crawford
- Attendance: 19,911

Game 6 of the 1998 NBA Finals, the championship series for the National Basketball Association's (NBA) 1997–98 season, was held on June 14, 1998, at the Delta Center in Salt Lake City, Utah. It was contested between the visiting Chicago Bulls and the Utah Jazz, with Chicago having a 3-2 lead in the best-of-seven series. In the closing seconds of the game, the Bulls guard Michael Jordan executed a quick cross-over on Jazz forward Bryon Russell, and then hit a game-winning jumpshot from behind the free throw line to give the Bulls an 87–86 lead with 5.2 seconds remaining in the fourth quarter. The Bulls held on to win the game after John Stockton missed a three-point field goal, winning their sixth NBA championship in eight years.

Game 6 was the final game with the Bulls for Michael Jordan and coach Phil Jackson; both would retire from the NBA, then eventually return. It is widely cited as one of the most intense and iconic games in NBA history. It earned, and still holds, the highest television ratings of an NBA game of all time.

== Background ==
Both the Utah Jazz and the Chicago Bulls finished the regular season tied for the best record in the NBA at 62–20. The Jazz defeated the Los Angeles Lakers in the Western Conference finals, and the Bulls defeated the Indiana Pacers in the Eastern Conference finals, setting up a rematch of the prior year's NBA Finals, which the Bulls won in six games. The Jazz swept the regular season series against the Bulls 2–0, giving them the tiebreaker for home-court advantage.

In the Finals series, the Jazz won Game 1, while the Bulls won Games 2–4. At the United Center in Game 5, Michael Jordan missed a potential game-winning 3-pointer at the buzzer, allowing the Jazz to stave off elimination with an 83–81 victory and return to Utah for Game 6 and a potential Game 7. None of the previous five Finals appearances for the Bulls had gone to a Game 7.

== Game summary ==
External videos
- Full game broadcast by NBC on YouTube

Scottie Pippen scored the opening basket on a slam dunk that aggravated a back injury, causing him pain and difficulty moving throughout the game. Pippen was limited to 8 points on 4–7 shooting in 26 minutes played. Michael Jordan took 35 of the Bulls' 67 shots, leading the team in scoring and minutes played with 45 points in 44 minutes. Jordan's 45 points set a Finals record for the most points in a championship-clinching game on the road, a feat only matched 28 years later by Jalen Brunson (2026, Game 5). Karl Malone led the Jazz in both categories with 31 points in 43 minutes.

In the first half of the game, while the Jazz led 28–24 with just under 10 minutes left in the second quarter, Jazz guard Howard Eisley saved a pass that almost sent the ball out of bounds. As the shot clock was running down, Jazz forward/center Antoine Carr passed the ball a long distance to Shandon Anderson, but the ball flew over Anderson's hands. Eisley caught the ball and hit a 3-pointer, but referee Dick Bavetta ruled that Eisley released the ball after the shot clock expired. Replays showed that the ball had left Eisley's hands with a second left on the shot clock (the NBA did not use instant replay to review calls until 2002). Calling the game for NBC, Bob Costas narrated a replay of Eisley's shot: "See if the ball isn't out of his hand. One second...it's on the way, and they missed the call." Jazz head coach Jerry Sloan opted not to argue the call because it may risk a second technical foul which could lead to ejection. In the second half, Bulls guard Ron Harper made a jump shot as the shot clock went off that tied it at 79; at the NBC play-by-play, Costas announced that Harper released the ball on time, but commentator Isiah Thomas, narrating a replay of Harper's shot, considered it to be "a tough call." At the replay, Costas indicated the call was likely missed and gave context: "If they missed that call, it’s a five-point swing in missed calls on shot-clock situations. They took a Howard Eisley three away, wrongly, in the first half. This one was even closer but it appeared that Harper may have been just a fraction of a second behind the shot clock.” Thomas concluded, "I think that was a shot clock violation."

Although the Jazz held a 49–45 lead at halftime and a 66–61 at the end of the 3rd quarter, they let them slip away in the fourth. John Stockton hit a 3-pointer with 41.9 seconds left to give the Jazz an 86–83 lead. Michael Jordan scored a layup on the following possession to cut the lead to one. With 18.9 seconds left and the Jazz in possession, Jordan stole the ball from Karl Malone in the low post and dribbled down the court. Bryon Russell guarded Jordan as time wound down. Jordan drove inside the 3-point line, and executed a quick cross-over. Jordan then hit a 20-footer to give the Bulls an 87–86 lead with 5.2 seconds left. Neil Funk made the call for the Bulls' radio network.

Hornacek screens across. Malone to the post. Malone...stripped by Michael, to the floor, stolen by MJ! Michael the steal! 16 seconds left, Bulls down one...Michael against Russell, 12 seconds...11...10. Jordan, Jordan, a drive, hangs...fires...SCORES! HE SCORES! The Bulls lead 87-86 with five and two-tenths left, and now they're one stop away! Oh my goodness...oh, my goodness!

Bob Costas, calling the game on television for NBC, had this call.

Jordan with 43. Malone is doubled. They swat at him and steal it! Here comes Chicago. 17 seconds. 17 seconds, for Game 7, or for championship #6. Jordan, open, CHICAGO WITH THE LEAD! Timeout Utah, 5.2 seconds left. Michael Jordan, running on fumes, with 45 points.

Then as the replays of Jordan's shot were being shown, Costas added.

That may have been, who knows what will unfold over the next several months, but that may have been the last shot Michael Jordan will ever take in the NBA.

Utah called timeout to set up the final play of the game. John Stockton took the inbound pass, and missed a game-winning 3-pointer that would have sent the series to a Game 7, and the Bulls celebrated. It was mentioned by Costas that Ron Harper may have blocked the ball with his fingertips. Antoine Carr was open during the shot, but the rebound went just out of his reach. The game was Jordan's final shot as a Bulls player and his 25th game-winning shot for Chicago.

== Box score ==
NBC

June 14, 1998
9:00 PM (7:00 PM MDT)

NBA.com Box Score

Chicago Bulls 87, Utah Jazz 86
Scoring by quarter: 22–25, 23–24, 16–17, 26–20
Pts: Michael Jordan 45; Rebs: Dennis Rodman 8 Asts: Toni Kukoč, Scottie Pippen 4	Pts: Karl Malone 31; Rebs: Karl Malone 11; Asts: Karl Malone 7

Attendance: 19,911
Referees: Dick Bavetta, Hue Hollins, Danny Crawford

Chicago Bulls
Player	Min	FGM	FGA	FG%	3PM	3PA	3P%	FTM	FTA	FT%	OREB	DREB	REB	AST	STL	BLK	TO	PF	PTS	+/−
Michael Jordan	43:41	15	35	.429	3	7	.429	12	15	.800	0	1	1	1	4	0	1	2	45	+2
Toni Kukoč	42:06	7	14	.500	1	2	.500	0	0		0	3	3	4	0	0	0	3	15	+8
Ron Harper	28:34	3	4	.750	0	1	.000	2	2	1.000	0	3	3	3	1	2	1	2	8	+5
Scottie Pippen	25:43	4	7	.571	0	0		0	0		0	3	3	4	2	1	2	2	8	+16
Luc Longley	14:34	0	1	.000	0	0		0	0		0	2	2	0	1	0	0	4	0	−4
Dennis Rodman	38:59	3	3	1.000	0	0		1	2	.500	4	4	8	1	2	1	2	5	7	+5
Steve Kerr	24:05	0	0		0	0		0	0		0	0	0	3	1	0	1	3	0	−3
Scott Burrell	10:18	0	1	.000	0	0		0	0		0	0	0	0	0	0	0	0	0	−17
Jud Buechler	8:00	1	1	1.000	0	0		0	0		1	1	2	1	0	0	0	1	2	+3
Bill Wennington	4:00	1	1	1.000	0	0		0	0		0	0	0	0	0	0	2	1	2	−10
Randy Brown	Did not play																			
Dickey Simpkins	Did not play																			
Total	240	34	67	.507	4	10	.400	15	19	.789	5	17	22	17	11	4	11	23	87	

Utah Jazz
Player	Min	FGM	FGA	FG%	3PM	3PA	3P%	FTM	FTA	FT%	OREB	DREB	REB	AST	STL	BLK	TO	PF	PTS	+/−
Karl Malone	42:56	11	19	.579	0	0		9	11	.818	5	6	11	7	1	0	5	2	31	−2
Bryon Russell	37:28	2	5	.400	0	2	.000	3	4	.750	1	3	4	2	0	0	1	2	7	−2
Jeff Hornacek	36:53	6	12	.500	1	3	.333	4	4	1.000	1	5	6	0	1	0	3	0	17	+5
John Stockton	32:44	4	10	.400	1	4	.250	1	2	.500	0	3	3	5	0	0	3	4	10	−13
Adam Keefe	14:12	1	3	.333	0	0		0	0		1	0	1	0	1	0	0	1	2	−11
Antoine Carr	26:07	4	7	.571	0	0		1	2	.500	1	2	3	0	0	0	0	4	9	+9
Chris Morris	16:09	1	3	.333	0	1	.000	0	0		0	2	2	1	0	0	0	4	2	+3
Shandon Anderson	15:46	2	4	.500	0	0		1	1	1.000	1	0	1	1	0	0	0	0	5	−7
Howard Eisley	15:16	1	1	1.000	0	0		1	1	1.000	0	2	2	3	0	0	0	1	3	+12
Greg Foster	2:29	0	0		0	0		0	0		0	0	0	0	1	0	2	1	0	+1
Greg Ostertag	Did not play																			
Jacque Vaughn	Did not play																			
Total	240	32	64	.500	2	10	.200	20	25	.800	10	23	33	19	4	0	17	19	86	

== Broadcasting ==
In the United States, the NBC television network broadcast the game and all other 1998 NBA Finals games live under the NBA on NBC series. The game registered a 22.3 Nielsen rating and 38 share with average 35.9 million viewers – the highest rated and most watched game in the history of the NBA, 72 million people in the US watched at least part of the game. The previous record was a 21.2 rating and 37 share for Game 7 of the 1988 NBA Finals between the Los Angeles Lakers and Detroit Pistons.

== Legacy ==
Michael Jordan debuted the Air Jordan 14 during Game 6, a black and varsity red colorway of the shoe. Lead Air Jordan shoe designer Tinker Hatfield had given Jordan an early prototype of the shoe, asking him to refrain from wearing it, but Jordan refused and worn them anyways. The shoes have since been known as the “Last Shot”. With Jordan’s retirement following the game, this was the only time Jordan worn the Air Jordan 14 model, professionally.

Michael Jordan's game-winner to put the Bulls up 87–86 with 5.2 seconds left is remembered as one of the greatest plays in NBA history. In 2010, John Hollinger of ESPN ranked Jordan's last shot as a Bulls player fourth among 50 best single-game performances. The shot was recreated for the 2006 television ad "Second Generation".

The officiating of this game continued to be discussed decades later. In 2008, Tim Buckley of the Deseret News (a daily newspaper published in Salt Lake City) wrote in a profile of Jazz coach Jerry Sloan that the calls involving Howard Eisley and Ron Harper "to this day continue to be discussed and debated by disgruntled Jazz faithful."

Bryon Russell remarked in 2009: "Whether he pushed off or not, he was making that shot." John Stockton said Jordan did push off, but he would not have called it as an offensive foul. In The Last Dance documentary, Jordan shared his thoughts. "Everybody said I pushed off," Jordan told the documentary crew. "Bullshit. His energy was going that way. I didn't have to push him."

In 2009, Jordan mentioned Russell in his Hall of Fame induction speech, recalling an interaction they had during Jordan's first retirement in 1994: "[A]t this time, I had no thoughts of coming back and playing the game of basketball. Bryon Russell came over to me and said, 'Why did you quit? You know I could guard you.' ... From this day forward, if I ever see [Russell] in shorts, I'm coming at him." In response, Russell challenged Jordan to a game of one-on-one for charity. Such a match-up has not yet taken place, though the Utah Flash of the NBA Development League did stage a halftime game between Russell and a Jordan look-alike. The Flash offered refunds to fans who expected Jordan actually to appear.

After Michael Jordan retired, interest in the NBA declined, especially after the 1998–99 NBA lockout. Commenting on how the 1999 NBA Finals had the lowest television ratings for a Finals series since 1981, Eric Boehlert wrote in Salon.com: "Viewers stayed away because the season had been shortened; Michael Jordan had just retired; the Spurs and the Knicks faced each other in the Finals." Game 5 of the 2000 NBA Finals had only half as many viewers as Game 6 of the 1998 NBA Finals. However, during Game 5 of the 2001 Finals, when the Los Angeles Lakers won their second consecutive championship under former Bulls coach Phil Jackson, garnered the highest ratings for an NBA championship-winning game on NBC since Game 6 of the 1998 Finals. NBC's broadcast rights to NBA games expired after the 2002 NBA Finals, when the Lakers won their third consecutive championship under former Bulls coach Phil Jackson. The 2003 NBA Finals, now on ABC had even worse ratings (9.8 million), and only 11.5 million watched the 2005 Finals; the San Antonio Spurs won both years.
