= 1997–98 Chicago Bulls season =

Thirty-second NBA season, and sixth championship season, for the Chicago Bulls

- NBA champions
- Conference champions
- Division champions
- Head coach: Phil Jackson
- General manager: Jerry Krause
- Owners: Jerry Reinsdorf
- Arena: United Center

Results
- Record: 62–20 (.756)
- Place: Division: 1st (Central); Conference: 1st (Eastern)
- Playoff finish: NBA champions (Defeated Jazz 4–2)
- Stats at Basketball Reference

Local media
- Television: WGN-TV; SportsChannel/Fox Sports Chicago
- Radio: WMVP

The 1997–98 Chicago Bulls season was the 32nd season for the Chicago Bulls in the National Basketball Association. The Bulls entered the regular season as the 2-time defending NBA champions, and in the Finals, they met the Utah Jazz in a rematch from the prior year's NBA Finals and just like that year, they would go on to defeat the Jazz in six games to win their sixth championship in eight years and complete the franchise's second "3-peat".

== Season summary ==
=== Off-season ===
During the off-season, the Bulls acquired Scott Burrell from the Golden State Warriors, and signed free agent Joe Kleine. However, All-Star forward Scottie Pippen would miss the first half of the regular season, due to an injured toe on his left foot sustained from the 1997 NBA playoffs. Without Pippen, the Bulls started by winning the 1997 McDonald's Championship overseas in Paris, France in October, with Michael Jordan being named the Most Valuable Player.

=== Regular season ===
In the regular season, the team got off to a slow 8–7 start, but then won 15 of their next 18 games, including an eight-game winning streak in December, until Pippen eventually returned in January. However, three-point specialist Steve Kerr suffered a fractured collarbone in January, and only played just 50 games. Despite the injuries, the Bulls held a 34–15 record at the All-Star break.

At mid-season, the team traded Jason Caffey to the Golden State Warriors in exchange for David Vaughn. Vaughn only played just three games with the Bulls before being waived on March 2, 1998, as he later on signed as a free agent with the New Jersey Nets. Also in early March, the team re-signed former Bulls reserve forward Dickey Simpkins, who was previously released by the Warriors, and played in the final 21 games of the regular season. The Bulls posted another eight-game winning streak in February, then posted a 13-game winning streak between March and April, and still finished in first place in the Central Division with a 62–20 record, earning the first seed in the Eastern Conference; the team qualified for the NBA playoffs for the 14th consecutive year. The Bulls had the third best team defensive rating in the NBA.

Jordan once again led the league in scoring averaging 28.7 points, 5.8 rebounds, 3.5 assists and 1.7 steals per game; he was named to the All-NBA First Team, and to the NBA All-Defensive First Team, and also won his fifth and final NBA Most Valuable Player of the Year award. In addition, Pippen averaged 19.1 points, 5.2 rebounds, 5.8 assists and 1.8 steals per game in 44 games, and was named to the All-NBA Third Team, and also to the NBA All-Defensive First Team, while Toni Kukoč provided the team with 13.3 points and 4.2 assists per game, playing most of the season as the team's starting small forward in Pippen's absence, and Luc Longley provided with 11.4 points and 5.9 rebounds per game. Meanwhile, Ron Harper contributed 9.3 points and 1.3 steals per game, Kerr contributed 7.5 points per game, Burrell averaged 5.2 points per game, rebound-specialist Dennis Rodman provided with 4.7 points and 15.0 rebounds per game, and Randy Brown contributed 4.1 points per game.

During the NBA All-Star weekend at Madison Square Garden in New York City, New York, Jordan was selected for the 1998 NBA All-Star Game, as a member of the Eastern Conference All-Star team. Jordan scored 23 points along with 6 rebounds, 8 assists and 3 steals, and won his third and final NBA All-Star Game Most Valuable Player award, as the Eastern Conference defeated the Western Conference, 135–114. Jordan also finished in fourth place in Defensive Player of the Year voting, while Rodman finished tied in fifth place, and Pippen finished tied in ninth place; Pippen also finished in tenth place in Most Valuable Player voting, and head coach Phil Jackson finished tied in seventh place in Coach of the Year voting.

The Bulls led the NBA in home-game attendance, with an attendance of 983,444 at the United Center during the regular season.

=== NBA playoffs ===
In the Eastern Conference First Round of the 1998 NBA playoffs, the Bulls faced off against the 8th–seeded Nets, a team that featured Sam Cassell, rookie power forward Keith Van Horn, and All-Star center Jayson Williams. In their first two home games at the United Center, the Bulls won Game 1 over the Nets in overtime, 96–93, before winning Game 2 by a score of 96–91 to take a 2–0 series lead. The Bulls won Game 3 over the Nets on the road, 116–101 at the Continental Airlines Arena to win the series in a three-game sweep.

In the Eastern Conference Semi-finals, the team faced off against the 4th–seeded Charlotte Hornets, who were led by All-Star forward Glen Rice, Anthony Mason and Vlade Divac. The Bulls won Game 1 over the Hornets at the United Center, 83–70, but then lost Game 2 at home by a score of 78–76, as the Hornets evened the series. However, the Bulls won the next two games on the road at the Charlotte Coliseum, before winning Game 5 over the Hornets at the United Center, 93–84 to win the series in five games.

In the Eastern Conference Finals, the Bulls then faced off against the 3rd–seeded Indiana Pacers, who were led by All-Star guard Reggie Miller, All-Star center Rik Smits, and Chris Mullin, and were also coached by retired All-Star forward, and former Boston Celtics legend, Larry Bird. The Bulls won the first two games over the Pacers at the United Center to take a 2–0 series lead, before losing the next two games on the road, as Miller hit a game-winning three-point shot in Game 4, in which the Pacers defeated the Bulls, 96–94 at the Market Square Arena to even the series. The Bulls won Game 5 at the United Center by a score of 106–87, but then lost Game 6 to the Pacers at the Market Square Arena, 92–89. With the series tied at 3–3, the Bulls won Game 7 over the Pacers at the United Center, 88–83 to win in a hard-fought seven-game series, en route to advance to the NBA Finals for the third consecutive year.

In the 1998 NBA Finals, the Bulls once again faced off against the top–seeded Utah Jazz, who were led by the trio of All-Star forward Karl Malone, All-Star guard John Stockton, and Jeff Hornacek, in a rematch from the 1997 NBA Finals. Despite both teams finishing with a league-best 62–20 record, the Jazz had home-court advantage in the series, since they defeated the Bulls twice during the regular season. With the series starting at the Delta Center, the Bulls lost Game 1 to the Jazz in overtime, 88–85, but managed to win Game 2, 93–88 to even the series at 1–1. As the series moved to the United Center, the Bulls won Game 3 over the Jazz by a 42-point margin, 96–54, then won Game 4, 86–82 to take a 3–1 series lead; however, the Jazz won Game 5 on the road, 83–81.

In Game 6 at the Delta Center, and despite Pippen hurting his back after making a dunk early into the game, Jordan scored 45 points, and hit a memorable game-winning shot over Jazz forward Bryon Russell, as the Bulls defeated the Jazz, 87–86. Just like last year's Finals, the Bulls won the series over the Jazz in six games to win their third consecutive NBA championship, and sixth overall in eight years to complete the franchise's second "3-peat"; Jordan was named the NBA Finals Most Valuable Player for the sixth and final time.

At an average age of 32.096 years old, the Bulls became the oldest team to win an NBA championship.

=== Aftermath ===
This was Jordan's final season with the Bulls, as he announced his second retirement in January 1999, ending his NBA career after thirteen seasons; however, he would later on make a second comeback with the Washington Wizards in 2001. Following the season, Jackson resigned as head coach after nine seasons with the Bulls, while Pippen was traded to the Houston Rockets after eleven seasons in Chicago, and Rodman signed as a free agent with the Los Angeles Lakers. Meanwhile, Longley was traded to the Phoenix Suns, Kerr was dealt to the San Antonio Spurs, Burrell signed with the New Jersey Nets, Jud Buechler signed with the Detroit Pistons, and Kleine re-signed with the Suns, his former team.

Because of this dismantling of the team, this was the last season for the Bulls dynasty that had headlined the NBA throughout the 1990s. What followed was a long rebuilding process between 1998 and 2004, and the Bulls would not return to the NBA playoffs again until the 2004–05 season, and to date have not appeared in the NBA Finals since. The story of this season was captured in ESPN's The Last Dance, which aired in April 2020.

== Offseason ==
=== NBA draft ===
Round	Pick	Player	Position	Nationality	School/Club team
1	28	Keith Booth	SF	United States	Maryland
2	58	Roberto Dueñas	C	Spain	FC Barcelona (Spain)

== Roster ==
1997–98 Chicago Bulls roster
Players

Pos.	No.	Player	Height	Weight	DOB	From
F	22	Keith Booth	6 ft 6 in (1.98 m)	226 lb (103 kg)	1974–10–09	Maryland
G	1	Randy Brown	6 ft 2 in (1.88 m)	190 lb (86 kg)	1968–05–22	New Mexico State
F	30	Jud Buechler	6 ft 6 in (1.98 m)	220 lb (100 kg)	1968–06–19	Arizona
F	24	Scott Burrell	6 ft 7 in (2.01 m)	218 lb (99 kg)	1971–01–12	Connecticut
G	9	Ron Harper	6 ft 6 in (1.98 m)	185 lb (84 kg)	1964–01–20	Miami (OH)
G	23	Michael Jordan	6 ft 6 in (1.98 m)	215 lb (98 kg)	1963–02–17	North Carolina
G	25	Steve Kerr	6 ft 3 in (1.91 m)	175 lb (79 kg)	1965–09–27	Arizona
C	53	Joe Kleine	6 ft 11 in (2.11 m)	255 lb (116 kg)	1962–01–04	Arkansas
F	7	Toni Kukoč	6 ft 10 in (2.08 m)	192 lb (87 kg)	1968–09–18	Croatia
G	5	Rusty LaRue	6 ft 2 in (1.88 m)	210 lb (95 kg)	1973–12–10	Wake Forest
C	13	Luc Longley	7 ft 2 in (2.18 m)	265 lb (120 kg)	1969–01–19	New Mexico
F	33	Scottie Pippen	6 ft 7 in (2.01 m)	220 lb (100 kg)	1965–09–25	Central Arkansas
F	91	Dennis Rodman	6 ft 8 in (2.03 m)	210 lb (95 kg)	1961–05–13	SE Oklahoma State
F	8	Dickey Simpkins	6 ft 9 in (2.06 m)	248 lb (112 kg)	1972–04–06	Providence
C	34	Bill Wennington	7 ft 0 in (2.13 m)	245 lb (111 kg)	1963–04–26	St. John's

Coaches
Head coach
- Phil Jackson
Assistant(s)
- Bill Cartwright
- Frank Hamblen
- Jimmy Rodgers
- Tex Winter

Legend
- (DP) Unsigned draft pick
- (FA) Free agent
- (S) Suspended
- Injured

Roster
Updated: March 2, 1998

=== Roster notes ===
- Power forward David Vaughn was waived on March 2, 1998.

== Regular season ==
=== Season standings ===
Central Division	W	L	PCT	GB	Home	Road	Div
y-Chicago Bulls	62	20	.756	–	37–4	25–16	21–7
x-Indiana Pacers	58	24	.707	4	32–9	26–15	19–9
x-Charlotte Hornets	51	31	.622	11	32–9	19–22	16–12
x-Atlanta Hawks	50	32	.610	12	29–12	21–20	19–9
x-Cleveland Cavaliers	47	35	.573	15	27–14	20–21	14–14
Detroit Pistons	37	45	.451	25	25–16	12–29	12–16
Milwaukee Bucks	36	46	.439	26	21–20	15–26	9–19
Toronto Raptors	16	66	.195	46	9–32	7–34	2–26

#	Eastern Conference				
#	Team	W	L	PCT	GB
1	c-Chicago Bulls	62	20	.756	–
2	y-Miami Heat	55	27	.671	7
3	x-Indiana Pacers	58	24	.707	4
4	x-Charlotte Hornets	51	31	.622	11
5	x-Atlanta Hawks	50	32	.610	12
6	x-Cleveland Cavaliers	47	35	.573	15
7	x-New York Knicks	43	39	.524	19
8	x-New Jersey Nets	43	39	.524	19
9	Washington Wizards	42	40	.512	20
10	Orlando Magic	41	41	.500	21
11	Detroit Pistons	37	45	.451	25
12	Boston Celtics	36	46	.439	26
13	Milwaukee Bucks	36	46	.439	26
14	Philadelphia 76ers	31	51	.378	31
15	Toronto Raptors	16	66	.195	46

== Game log ==
=== Regular season ===
1997–98 game log
Total: 62–20 (Home: 37–4; Road: 25–16)
October: 0–1 (home: 0–0; road: 0–1)

Game	Date	Team	Score	High points	High rebounds	High assists	Location Attendance	Record
1	October 31	@ Boston	L 85–92	Michael Jordan (30)	Dennis Rodman (9)	Harper & Jordan (4)	FleetCenter; 18,624	0–1

November: 9–6 (home: 6–1; road: 3–5)

Game	Date	Team	Score	High points	High rebounds	High assists	Location Attendance	Record
2	November 1	Philadelphia	W 94–74	Ron Harper (17)	Dennis Rodman (13)	Ron Harper (8)	United Center; 24,196	1–1
3	November 3	San Antonio	W 87–83 (2OT)	Michael Jordan (29)	Dennis Rodman (22)	Jordan & Harper (4)	United Center; 23,868	2–1
4	November 5	Orlando	W 94–81	Michael Jordan (29)	Michael Jordan (17)	Steve Kerr (5)	United Center; 23,809	3–1
5	November 7	@ Atlanta	L 78–80	Michael Jordan (27)	Jordan & Longley (9)	Michael Jordan (6)	Georgia Dome; 45,790	3–2
6	November 8	New Jersey	W 99–86	Steve Kerr (21)	Dennis Rodman (12)	Toni Kukoč (7)	United Center; 23,898	4–2
7	November 11	@ Cleveland	L 80–101	Michael Jordan (19)	Jason Caffey (8)	Brown & Kerr (5)	Gund Arena; 20,562	4–3
8	November 12	Washington	L 83–90	Michael Jordan (28)	Dennis Rodman (14)	Harper & Longley (5)	United Center; 23,749	4–4
9	November 14	Charlotte	W 105–92	Michael Jordan (28)	Dennis Rodman (14)	Michael Jordan (7)	United Center; 23,894	5–4
10	November 15	Cleveland	W 79–70	Michael Jordan (27)	Dennis Rodman (18)	Toni Kukoč (7)	United Center; 23,906	6–4
11	November 20	@ Phoenix	L 85–89	Michael Jordan (30)	Dennis Rodman (14)	Ron Harper (5)	America West Arena; 19,023	6–5
12	November 21	@ L.A. Clippers	W 111–102 (2OT)	Michael Jordan (49)	Luc Longley (17)	Toni Kukoč (6)	Los Angeles Memorial Sports Arena; 16,199	7–5
13	November 23	@ Sacramento	W 103–88	Michael Jordan (33)	Dennis Rodman (14)	Toni Kukoč (8)	ARCO Arena; 17,317	8–5
14	November 25	@ Seattle	L 90–91	Toni Kukoč (30)	Dennis Rodman (17)	Harper & Kukoč (6)	KeyArena; 17,072	8–6
15	November 28	@ Indiana	L 83–94	Michael Jordan (26)	Dennis Rodman (11)	Toni Kukoč (4)	Market Square Arena; 16,736	8–7
16	November 29	@ Washington	W 88–83	Michael Jordan (29)	Dennis Rodman (17)	Ron Harper (7)	US Airways Arena; 18,756	9–7

December: 11–3 (home: 9–0; road: 2–3)

Game	Date	Team	Score	High points	High rebounds	High assists	Location Attendance	Record
17	December 3	@ Boston	W 97–87	Michael Jordan (29)	Dennis Rodman (17)	Toni Kukoč (11)	FleetCenter; 18,624	10–7
18	December 5	Milwaukee	W 82–64	Toni Kukoč (19)	Dennis Rodman (14)	Dennis Rodman (5)	United Center; 24,041	11–7
19	December 9	New York	W 100–82	Michael Jordan (29)	3 players tied (9)	Harper & Jordan (4)	United Center; 24,107	12–7
20	December 10	@ Orlando	L 98–106	Michael Jordan (25)	Dennis Rodman (16)	Toni Kukoč (7)	Orlando Arena; 17,248	12–8
21	December 12	@ Charlotte	L 77–79	Michael Jordan (28)	Dennis Rodman (19)	Toni Kukoč (7)	Charlotte Coliseum; 24,042	12–9
22	December 13	Toronto	W 97–70	Ron Harper (20)	Dennis Rodman (14)	Toni Kukoč (6)	United Center; 23,867	13–9
23	December 15	Phoenix	W 111–104	Michael Jordan (31)	Dennis Rodman (21)	Brown & Rodman (6)	United Center; 23,888	14–9
24	December 17	L.A. Lakers	W 104–83	Michael Jordan (36)	Dennis Rodman (14)	Toni Kukoč (8)	United Center; 24,119	15–9
25	December 20	@ New Jersey	W 100–92	Michael Jordan (24)	Dennis Rodman (24)	Dennis Rodman (5)	Continental Airlines Arena; 20,049	16–9
26	December 23	L.A. Clippers	W 94–89	Michael Jordan (27)	Dennis Rodman (25)	3 players tied (4)	United Center; 23,904	17–9
27	December 25	Miami	W 90–80	Michael Jordan (24)	Dennis Rodman (13)	Toni Kukoč (5)	United Center; 24,182	18–9
28	December 27	Atlanta	W 97–90	Michael Jordan (47)	Dennis Rodman (29)	Dennis Rodman (5)	United Center; 24,131	19–9
29	December 29	Dallas	W 111–105	Michael Jordan (41)	Dennis Rodman (27)	Dennis Rodman (8)	United Center; 23,712	20–9
30	December 30	@ Minnesota	L 95–99	Michael Jordan (33)	Dennis Rodman (13)	Toni Kukoč (8)	Target Center; 20,097	20–10

January: 13–3 (home: 6–1; road: 7–2)

Game	Date	Team	Score	High points	High rebounds	High assists	Location Attendance	Record
31	January 2	Milwaukee	W 114–100	Michael Jordan (44)	Dennis Rodman (21)	Luc Longley (8)	United Center; 23,897	21–10
32	January 3	@ Detroit	W 105–96	Michael Jordan (34)	Dennis Rodman (18)	Michael Jordan (9)	The Palace of Auburn Hills; 22,076	22–10
33	January 6	Boston	W 90–79	Jordan & Kukoč (19)	Dennis Rodman (20)	Toni Kukoč (6)	United Center; 23,804	23–10
34	January 7	@ Miami	L 72–99	Michael Jordan (26)	Dennis Rodman (17)	Brown, Harper (4)	Miami Arena; 15,200	23–11
35	January 9	@ New York	W 90–89	Michael Jordan (44)	Luc Longley (10)	Luc Longley (6)	Madison Square Garden; 19,763	24–11
36	January 10	Golden State	W 87–82	Michael Jordan (32)	Dennis Rodman (16)	Scottie Pippen (5)	United Center; 23,902	25–11
37	January 13	Seattle	W 101–91	Michael Jordan (40)	Dennis Rodman (17)	Dennis Rodman (6)	United Center; 24,112	26–11
38	January 15	@ Philadelphia	L 96–106	Scottie Pippen (22)	Dennis Rodman (20)	Harper & Pippen (5)	CoreStates Center; 21,104	26–12
39	January 16	@ Milwaukee	W 96–86	Michael Jordan (27)	Dennis Rodman (12)	Luc Longley (5)	Bradley Center; 18,717	27–12
40	January 18	Houston	W 106–100	Michael Jordan (45)	Longley & Rodman (5)	Scottie Pippen (10)	United Center; 24,209	28–12
41	January 21	Charlotte	W 110–79	Michael Jordan (33)	Luc Longley (13)	Scottie Pippen (7)	United Center; 23,967	29–12
42	January 23	@ New Jersey	W 100–98 (OT)	Michael Jordan (32)	Scottie Pippen (7)	Kukoč & Pippen (9)	Continental Airlines Arena; 20,049	30–12
43	January 25	Utah	L 94–101	Michael Jordan (32)	Dennis Rodman (14)	Scottie Pippen (10)	United Center; 24,361	30–13
44	January 27	@ Vancouver	W 103–85	Scottie Pippen (29)	Dennis Rodman (22)	Pippen & Rodman (6)	General Motors Place; 19,193	31–13
45	January 29	@ Portland	W 100–87	Michael Jordan (29)	Dennis Rodman (20)	Longley & Pippen (8)	Rose Garden; 21,538	32–13
46	January 30	@ Golden State	W 87–80	Scottie Pippen (22)	Dennis Rodman (22)	Scottie Pippen (4)	The Arena in Oakland; 19,804	33–13

February: 10–3 (home: 6–1; road: 4–2)

Game	Date	Team	Score	High points	High rebounds	High assists	Location Attendance	Record
47	February 1	@ L.A. Lakers	L 87–112	Michael Jordan (31)	Dennis Rodman (15)	Brown & Pippen (5)	Great Western Forum; 17,505	33–14
48	February 2	@ Denver	W 111–72	Scott Burrell (24)	Dennis Rodman (16)	Buechler & Caffey (4)	McNichols Sports Arena; 17,171	34–14
49	February 4	@ Utah	L 93–101	Michael Jordan (40)	Luc Longley (11)	Dennis Rodman (4)	Delta Center; 19,911	34–15
All-Star Break
50	February 10	Toronto	W 93–86	Toni Kukoč (21)	Dennis Rodman (17)	Scottie Pippen (9)	United Center; 23,881	35–15
51	February 11	@ Charlotte	W 92–90	Michael Jordan (29)	Dennis Rodman (11)	3 players tied (6)	Charlotte Coliseum; 24,042	36–15
52	February 13	Atlanta	W 112–110	Michael Jordan (37)	Michael Jordan (7)	Scottie Pippen (7)	United Center; 24,207	37–15
53	February 15	Detroit	W 99–90	Toni Kukoč (22)	Michael Jordan (12)	Jordan & Pippen (5)	United Center; 24,139	38–15
54	February 17	Indiana	W 105–97	Michael Jordan (27)	Dennis Rodman (13)	Michael Jordan (6)	United Center; 24,131	39–15
55	February 19	@ Toronto	W 123–86	Scottie Pippen (22)	Dennis Rodman (19)	Scottie Pippen (6)	SkyDome; 30,172	40–15
56	February 21	@ Washington	W 94–88	Scottie Pippen (23)	Dennis Rodman (17)	Toni Kukoč (5)	MCI Center; 20,674	41–15
57	February 23	Cleveland	W 97–75	Michael Jordan (17)	Ron Harper (10)	Brown & Kukoč (7)	United Center; 23,902	42–15
58	February 25	Portland	L 101–106	Michael Jordan (33)	Dennis Rodman (14)	Kukoč & Pippen (6)	United Center; 23,821	42–16
59	February 28	Sacramento	W 109–94	Scottie Pippen (29)	Dennis Rodman (18)	Pippen & Rodman (6)	United Center; 23,914	43–16

March: 13–1 (home: 6–0; road: 7–1)

Game	Date	Team	Score	High points	High rebounds	High assists	Location Attendance	Record
60	March 3	Denver	W 118–90	Michael Jordan (30)	Dennis Rodman (17)	Toni Kukoč (10)	United Center; 23,810	44–16
61	March 8	@ New York	W 102–89	Michael Jordan (42)	Dennis Rodman (20)	Jordan & Pippen (6)	Madison Square Garden; 19,763	45–16
62	March 10	Miami	W 106–91	Michael Jordan (37)	Dennis Rodman (10)	Kukoč & Pippen (8)	United Center; 24,102	46–16
63	March 12	@ Dallas	L 97–104 (OT)	Michael Jordan (26)	Dennis Rodman (22)	Toni Kukoč (6)	Reunion Arena; 18,255	46–17
64	March 14	@ San Antonio	W 96–86	Michael Jordan (30)	Dennis Rodman (16)	Scottie Pippen (5)	Alamodome; 37,492	47–17
65	March 16	New Jersey	W 88–72	Toni Kukoč (21)	Dennis Rodman (16)	Kukoč & Rodman (5)	United Center; 23,908	48–17
66	March 17	@ Indiana	W 90–84	Michael Jordan (35)	Dennis Rodman (19)	Scottie Pippen (5)	Market Square Arena; 16,729	49–17
67	March 20	Vancouver	W 98–92	Michael Jordan (24)	Toni Kukoč (11)	Ron Harper (4)	United Center; 24,023	50–17
68	March 22	@ Toronto	W 102–100	Jordan & Pippen (33)	Dennis Rodman (18)	3 players tied (5)	SkyDome; 33,216	51–17
69	March 23	Boston	W 111–88	Scottie Pippen (27)	Dennis Rodman (14)	Toni Kukoč (10)	United Center; 23,944	52–17
70	March 25	@ Orlando	W 85–70	Scottie Pippen (23)	Dennis Rodman (18)	Michael Jordan (8)	Orlando Arena; 17,248	53–17
71	March 27	@ Atlanta	W 89–74	Michael Jordan (34)	Dennis Rodman (15)	Ron Harper (6)	Georgia Dome; 62,046	54–17
72	March 29	@ Milwaukee	W 104–87	Michael Jordan (30)	Dennis Rodman (17)	Toni Kukoč (8)	Bradley Center; 18,717	55–17
73	March 31	Detroit	W 106–101 (OT)	Scottie Pippen (27)	Dennis Rodman (18)	Michael Jordan (8)	United Center; 23,942	56–17

April: 6–3 (home: 4–1; road: 2–2)

Game	Date	Team	Score	High points	High rebounds	High assists	Location Attendance	Record
74	April 3	Minnesota	W 107–93	Scottie Pippen (27)	Dennis Rodman (18)	Michael Jordan (8)	United Center; 23,985	57–17
75	April 5	@ Houston	W 109–94	Michael Jordan (40)	Dennis Rodman (12)	Pippen & Rodman (8)	Compaq Center; 16,285	58–17
76	April 7	Washington	W 103–85	Michael Jordan (30)	Dennis Rodman (20)	Scottie Pippen (7)	United Center; 23,969	59–17
77	April 9	@ Cleveland	L 85–91	Michael Jordan (29)	Dennis Rodman (20)	Scottie Pippen (8)	Gund Arena; 20,562	59–18
78	April 11	Orlando	W 87–78	Michael Jordan (37)	Dennis Rodman (10)	Pippen & Rodman (6)	United Center; 24,104	60–18
79	April 13	Indiana	L 105–114	Scottie Pippen (28)	Dennis Rodman (9)	Harper & Rodman (4)	United Center; 23,957	60–19
80	April 15	@ Detroit	L 79–87	Michael Jordan (19)	Dennis Rodman (15)	Harper & Kukoč (5)	The Palace of Auburn Hills; 22,076	60–20
81	April 17	@ Philadelphia	W 87–80	Michael Jordan (24)	Dennis Rodman (17)	Scottie Pippen (4)	CoreStates Center; 21,305	61–20
82	April 18	New York	W 111–109	Michael Jordan (44)	Dennis Rodman (8)	Scottie Pippen (10)	United Center; 24,182	62–20

1997–98 schedule

=== Playoffs ===
1998 playoff game log
Total: 15–6 (Home: 10–2; Road: 5–4)
First Round: 3–0 (home: 2–0; road: 1–0)

Game	Date	Team	Score	High points	High rebounds	High assists	Location Attendance	Series
1	April 24	New Jersey	W 96–93 (OT)	Michael Jordan (39)	Dennis Rodman (8)	3 players tied (5)	United Center; 23,844	1–0
2	April 26	New Jersey	W 96–91	Michael Jordan (32)	Dennis Rodman (16)	Burrell & Rodman (4)	United Center; 23,844	2–0
3	April 29	@ New Jersey	W 116–101	Michael Jordan (38)	Dennis Rodman (17)	Scottie Pippen (10)	Continental Airlines Arena; 19,889	3–0

Conference Semifinals: 4–1 (home: 2–1; road: 2–0)

Game	Date	Team	Score	High points	High rebounds	High assists	Location Attendance	Series
1	May 3	Charlotte	W 83–70	Michael Jordan (35)	Dennis Rodman (14)	Jordan & Pippen (4)	United Center; 23,844	1–0
2	May 6	Charlotte	L 76–78	Michael Jordan (22)	Dennis Rodman (18)	Michael Jordan (6)	United Center; 23,844	1–1
3	May 8	@ Charlotte	W 103–89	Michael Jordan (27)	Dennis Rodman (17)	Michael Jordan (6)	Charlotte Coliseum; 23,799	2–1
4	May 10	@ Charlotte	W 94–80	Michael Jordan (31)	Dennis Rodman (18)	Scottie Pippen (8)	Charlotte Coliseum; 23,799	3–1
5	May 13	Charlotte	W 93–84	Michael Jordan (33)	Dennis Rodman (21)	Longley & Pippen (5)	United Center; 23,844	4–1

Conference Finals: 4–3 (home: 4–0; road: 0–3)

Game	Date	Team	Score	High points	High rebounds	High assists	Location Attendance	Series
1	May 17	Indiana	W 85–79	Michael Jordan (31)	Dennis Rodman (10)	Scottie Pippen (7)	United Center; 23,844	1–0
2	May 19	Indiana	W 104–98	Michael Jordan (41)	Ron Harper (9)	Jordan & Pippen (5)	United Center; 23,844	2–0
3	May 23	@ Indiana	L 105–107	Michael Jordan (30)	Dennis Rodman (12)	Michael Jordan (7)	Market Square Arena; 16,576	2–1
4	May 25	@ Indiana	L 94–96	Michael Jordan (28)	Dennis Rodman (16)	Scottie Pippen (10)	Market Square Arena; 16,560	2–2
5	May 27	Indiana	W 106–87	Michael Jordan (29)	Scottie Pippen (8)	Kukoč & Pippen (7)	United Center; 23,844	3–2
6	May 29	@ Indiana	L 89–92	Michael Jordan (35)	Dennis Rodman (12)	3 players tied (2)	Market Square Arena; 16,566	3–3
7	May 31	Indiana	W 88–83	Michael Jordan (28)	Scottie Pippen (12)	Michael Jordan (8)	United Center; 23,844	4–3

NBA Finals: 4–2 (home: 2–1; road: 2–1)

Game	Date	Team	Score	High points	High rebounds	High assists	Location Attendance	Series
1	June 3	@ Utah	L 85–88 (OT)	Michael Jordan (33)	Dennis Rodman (10)	Steve Kerr (5)	Delta Center; 19,911	0–1
2	June 5	@ Utah	W 93–88	Michael Jordan (37)	Kukoč & Rodman (9)	Scottie Pippen (4)	Delta Center; 19,911	1–1
3	June 7	Utah	W 96–54	Michael Jordan (24)	Ron Harper (10)	Ron Harper (7)	United Center; 23,844	2–1
4	June 10	Utah	W 86–82	Michael Jordan (34)	Dennis Rodman (14)	Scottie Pippen (5)	United Center; 23,844	3–1
5	June 12	Utah	L 81–83	Toni Kukoč (30)	Scottie Pippen (11)	Scottie Pippen (11)	United Center; 23,844	3–2
6	June 14	@ Utah	W 87–86	Michael Jordan (45)	Dennis Rodman (8)	Kukoč & Pippen (4)	Delta Center; 19,911	4–2

1998 schedule

== Player stats ==
Legend
GP	Games played	GS	Games started	MPG	Minutes per game
FG%	Field-goal percentage	3P%	3-point field-goal percentage	FT%	Free-throw percentage
RPG	Rebounds per game	APG	Assists per game	SPG	Steals per game
BPG	Blocks per game	PPG	Points per game

=== Regular season ===
Player	GP	GS	MPG	FG%	3P%	FT%	RPG	APG	SPG	BPG	PPG
Keith Booth	6	0	2.8	.333	.000	1.000	.7	.2	.00	.00	1.7
Randy Brown	71	6	16.2	.384	.000	.718	1.3	2.1	1.00	.17	4.1
Jud Buechler	74	0	8.2	.483	.385	.500	1.0	.7	.30	.20	2.7
Scott Burrell	80	3	13.7	.424	.354	.734	2.5	.8	.80	.46	5.2
Jason Caffey	51	8	13.9	.503	.000	.660	3.4	.7	.25	.33	5.3
Ron Harper	82	82	27.9	.441	.190	.750	3.5	2.9	1.32	.59	9.3
Michael Jordan	82	82	38.8	.465	.238	.784	5.8	3.5	1.72	.55	28.7
Steve Kerr	50	0	22.4	.454	.438	.918	1.5	1.9	.52	.10	7.5
Joe Kleine	46	1	8.6	.368	.000	.833	1.7	.7	.09	.11	2.0
Toni Kukoč	74	52	30.2	.455	.362	.708	4.4	4.2	1.03	.50	13.3
Rusty LaRue	14	0	10.0	.408	.250	.625	.6	.4	.21	.07	3.5
Luc Longley	58	58	29.4	.455	.000	.736	5.9	2.8	.59	1.07	11.4
Scottie Pippen	44	44	37.5	.447	.318	.777	5.2	5.8	1.80	.98	19.1
Dennis Rodman	80	66	35.7	.431	.174	.550	15.0	2.9	.59	.22	4.7
Dickey Simpkins	21	0	11.3	.634	.000	.591	1.5	.8	.19	.14	3.7
David Vaughn III	3	0	2.0	1.000	.000	.500	.3	.0	.00	.00	1.3
Bill Wennington	48	8	9.7	.436	.000	.810	1.7	.4	.08	.10	3.5

=== Postseason ===
Player	GP	GS	MPG	FG%	3P%	FT%	RPG	APG	SPG	BPG	PPG
Randy Brown	14		5.1	.167	.000	.833	.6	.6	.14	.00	.6
Jud Buechler	16		4.0	.364	.600	.000	.7	.2	.19	.06	.7
Scott Burrell	21		12.4	.438	.300	.909	2.0	.5	.90	.14	3.8
Ron Harper	21	21	26.8	.459	.263	.615	3.7	2.3	.95	.86	6.7
Michael Jordan	21	21	41.5	.462	.302	.812	5.1	3.5	1.52	.57	32.4
Steve Kerr	21		19.8	.434	.463	.818	.8	1.7	.33	.00	4.9
Toni Kukoč	21	17	30.3	.486	.377	.645	3.9	2.9	1.24	.48	13.1
Luc Longley	18	16	25.3	.450	.000	.872	5.0	1.9	.67	.83	7.9
Scottie Pippen	21	21	39.8	.415	.228	.679	7.1	5.2	2.14	.95	16.8
Dennis Rodman	21	9	34.4	.371	.250	.605	11.8	2.0	.67	.62	4.9
Dickey Simpkins	13		5.7	.375	.000	.444	1.0	.2	.15	.08	1.2
Bill Wennington	16		7.4	.526	.000	.500	.9	.2	.38	.12	2.8

Player statistics citation:

== NBA finals ==
=== 1998 NBA Finals Roster ===
Chicago Bulls	Utah Jazz
Head Coach: Phil Jackson	Head Coach: Jerry Sloan
Michael Jordan	Karl Malone
Scottie Pippen	Jeff Hornacek
Dennis Rodman	John Stockton
Luc Longley	Bryon Russell
Ron Harper	Shandon Anderson
Steve Kerr	Adam Keefe
Keith Booth	Howard Eisley
Scott Burrell	Antoine Carr
Randy Brown	Greg Foster
Dickey Simpkins	Greg Ostertag
Rusty LaRue	Chris Morris
Bill Wennington	Jacque Vaughn
Jud Buechler	Troy Hudson
Toni Kukoč	William Cunningham

=== Series summary ===
Legend: OT denotes a game decided in overtime

Game	Date	Home team	Result	Road team
Game 1	June 3	Utah	88-85 (OT)	Chicago
Game 2	June 5	Utah	88-93	Chicago
Game 3	June 7	Chicago	96-54	Utah
Game 4	June 10	Chicago	86-82	Utah
Game 5	June 12	Chicago	81-83	Utah
Game 6	June 14	Utah	86-87	Chicago

Bulls win series 4-2

=== Games 1 and 2 ===
This was the first time in the 1990s that the same two teams played each other in two consecutive finals. The Jazz had won both regular season match-ups, and many analysts predicted a hard-fought seven-game series. Predictions of a Jazz championship were strengthened with their game one victory in overtime in Utah. The Bulls would tie the series in game 2 putting together a fourth quarter run to silence the Delta Center and holding on to win 93–88, finally securing their first victory against Utah all season.

=== Games 3, 4 and 5 ===
The Finals would move to Chicago with control of the series at stake in Game 3. Though anticipation was high, no one could have expected a blow-out of the proportions seen in Game 3. With a 96–54 triumph over Utah, the Bulls would help the Jazz set an embarrassing record for the lowest points scored in Finals history and biggest margin of defeat, while everyone on the Bulls scored. The Jazz would pull themselves together in Game 4 in a better attempt to tie the series, but lost 86–82.

The early Jazz series-lead seemed like a distant memory, a false indication of a tough series as they hit the floor for Game 5 behind 3–1. Chicago fans prepared for the last game they would host with the Jordan-led Bulls of the 1990s. But any notions of a championship at the United Center would be snuffed out when, with 0.8 seconds on the game, Michael Jordan airballed an off-balance 3 to the right of the basket giving the Jazz a narrow 83–81 win. The play might have been for Toni Kukoč to shoot a three. With the series shifting back to Utah with a far more generous 3-2 Bulls advantage, the promise of another Chicago championship was not so certain.

=== Game 6 ===
The Chicago Bulls had never let a Finals series go to a Game 7.

As they arrived at the Delta Center for Game 6, things didn't look good for the Bulls. Scottie Pippen's back gave out when he dunked the opening basket of the game and he was slowed down and held to just 8 points. The Jazz suffered a bad break when the referees incorrectly nullified a Howard Eisley three-pointer that, replays showed, was clearly released just before the 24-second clock expired. In the 4th quarter, the Bulls closed the gap as Michael Jordan tallied many of his 45 overall points. Then things got worse for Chicago when John Stockton hit a clutch 3 with 41.9 seconds left to give Utah an 86–83 lead as the Delta Center crowd roared happily. Down by 3, the Bulls had one last chance to stay alive. Running perilously low on energy, it would be imperative for Chicago to win the series before the game went into OT, and also for the Bulls to avoid a Game 7 on the road when Scottie Pippen was so badly injured and their entire lineup was exhausted.

After Michael Jordan made a quick layup to cut the Jazz lead to one, the Bulls needed to stop the Jazz from scoring again. When John Stockton passed the ball to Karl Malone, Michael Jordan stole the ball away and dribbled to the front. Guarding him was Bryon Russell, one of the Jazz's best perimeter defenders. Jordan drove inside the 3-point line, executed a quick cross-over, and drilled a 20-ft. jump shot to give the Bulls an 87–86 lead with 5.2 seconds left. After Utah took a timeout, Stockton's 3 hit the rim and bounced away, giving the Bulls their 6th title in 8 years. The famous winning shot has been immortalized in many records, as Jordan completed a perfect sextet: 6 NBA Finals, 6 championships, and 6 NBA Finals MVP trophies.

== Awards and honors ==
- 1997 McDonald's Championship Winners
- Michael Jordan, McDonald's Championship MVP
- Michael Jordan, All-NBA First Team
- Scottie Pippen, All-NBA Third Team
- Michael Jordan, NBA All-Star Game MVP
- Michael Jordan, NBA MVP
- Michael Jordan, NBA Finals MVP
- Michael Jordan, NBA All-Defensive First Team
- Scottie Pippen, NBA All-Defensive First Team
- Michael Jordan, Favorite Male Athlete
- Chicago Bulls, Favorite Sports Team

=== NBA All-Star Game ===
- Michael Jordan, Guard
