= 1997 NBA Finals =

1997 basketball championship series

| Team | Coach | Wins |
|---|---|---|
| Chicago Bulls | Phil Jackson | 4 |
| Utah Jazz | Jerry Sloan | 2 |
- Dates: June 1–13
- MVP: Michael Jordan (Chicago Bulls)
- Hall of Famers: Bulls: Michael Jordan (2009); Toni Kukoc (2021); Robert Parish (2003); Scottie Pippen (2010); Dennis Rodman (2011); Jazz: Karl Malone (2010); John Stockton (2009); Coaches: Phil Jackson (2007); Jerry Sloan (2009); Tex Winter (2011); Officials: Dick Bavetta (2015); Danny Crawford (2025); Hugh Evans (2022)
- Eastern finals: Bulls defeated Heat, 4–1
- Western finals: Jazz defeated Rockets, 4–2

The 1997 NBA Finals was the championship series of the National Basketball Association's (NBA) 1996–97 season and conclusion of the season's playoffs. The Western Conference champion Utah Jazz took on the defending NBA champion and Eastern Conference champion Chicago Bulls for the title, with the Bulls holding home court advantage. The series was played under a best-of-seven format, with the first 2 games in Chicago, the next 3 games in Salt Lake City, and the last 2 games in Chicago.

The Bulls won the series 4 games to 2. For the fifth time in as many Finals appearances, Michael Jordan was named NBA Finals MVP.

The Bulls and Jazz won a combined 133 regular season games, the second most in Finals history behind the previous year's 136. Until 2016, the 1997 NBA Finals was the last to feature teams that won a total of at least 130 regular season games.

== Background ==
=== Chicago Bulls ===
For the Chicago Bulls, the campaign was almost identical to their record-breaking 1995–96 season. They began the season 12–0, and by the All-Star break, were 42–6, putting them on pace to win 70 games for a second year in a row. But some late-season injuries and poor play, including Scottie Pippen's failed attempt at a game-winning three-pointer in the Bulls' final regular season game against the New York Knicks, and the Bulls settled for a league-best 69–13 record. This tied the 1971–72 Los Angeles Lakers for the second-best regular season, only behind the 1995–96 Bulls (72–10) at the time. 19 years later, the 2015–16 Golden State Warriors (73–9) would break the wins record.

In the playoffs, the Bulls swept the Washington Bullets in the first round, dispatched the Atlanta Hawks in five games in the second round, then defeated the Miami Heat in five games in the Eastern Conference finals.

=== Utah Jazz ===
The Jazz emerged as a force in the Western Conference as far back as the mid-1980s, powered by its All-Star duo of point guard John Stockton and power forward Karl Malone. They advanced to the Western Conference finals three times between 1992 and 1996 (1992, 1994 and 1996), but lost on each occasion.

However, a different story was written for the 1996–97 season. Powered by league MVP Karl Malone, along with the talented John Stockton, the Jazz finally asserted themselves atop the Western Conference, finishing with a franchise-record 64 wins. Also notable on the season was Utah's complete rebrand, as they replaced their classic "J-Note" logo and Mardi Gras colors with a bold, gradient "Purple Mountain" motif.

In the playoffs, Utah swept the Los Angeles Clippers in the opening round and eliminated the Los Angeles Lakers in five games in the second round. Utah then eliminated the Houston Rockets to advance to their first NBA Finals in franchise history, thanks to John Stockton's buzzer-beating, three-point shot in Game 6 of the Western Conference finals.

Another storyline heading into the Finals was Jazz head coach Jerry Sloan coaching against his former team as a player. Sloan made the All-Star game twice with the Bulls and was a key player on Dick Motta’s defensive-minded teams throughout the 1960s and 1970s.

=== Road to the Finals ===
| Utah Jazz (Western Conference champion) | | Chicago Bulls (Eastern Conference champion) |
|---|---|---|
| 1996–97 NBA West standings: # / Western Conference; # / Team / W / L / PCT / GB; 1 / c-Utah Jazz / 64 / 18 / .780 / –; 2 / y-Seattle SuperSonics / 57 / 25 / .695 / 7; 3 / x-Houston Rockets / 57 / 25 / .695 / 7; 4 / x-Los Angeles Lakers / 56 / 26 / .683 / 8; 5 / x-Portland Trail Blazers / 49 / 33 / .598 / 15; 6 / x-Minnesota Timberwolves / 40 / 42 / .488 / 24; 7 / x-Phoenix Suns / 40 / 42 / .488 / 24; 8 / x-Los Angeles Clippers / 36 / 46 / .439 / 28; 9 / Sacramento Kings / 34 / 48 / .415 / 30; 10 / Golden State Warriors / 30 / 52 / .366 / 34; 11 / Dallas Mavericks / 24 / 58 / .293 / 40; 12 / Denver Nuggets / 21 / 61 / .256 / 43; 13 / San Antonio Spurs / 20 / 62 / .244 / 44; 14 / Vancouver Grizzlies / 14 / 68 / .171 / 50; 1st seed in the West, 2nd-best league record | Regular season | 1996–97 NBA East standings: # / Eastern Conference; # / Team / W / L / PCT / GB; 1 / z-Chicago Bulls / 69 / 13 / .841 / –; 2 / y-Miami Heat / 61 / 21 / .744 / 8; 3 / x-New York Knicks / 57 / 25 / .695 / 12; 4 / x-Atlanta Hawks / 56 / 26 / .683 / 13; 5 / x-Detroit Pistons / 54 / 28 / .659 / 15; 6 / x-Charlotte Hornets / 54 / 28 / .659 / 15; 7 / x-Orlando Magic / 45 / 37 / .549 / 24; 8 / x-Washington Bullets / 44 / 38 / .537 / 25; 9 / Cleveland Cavaliers / 42 / 40 / .512 / 27; 10 / Indiana Pacers / 39 / 43 / .476 / 30; 11 / Milwaukee Bucks / 33 / 49 / .402 / 36; 12 / Toronto Raptors / 30 / 52 / .366 / 39; 13 / New Jersey Nets / 26 / 56 / .317 / 43; 14 / Philadelphia 76ers / 22 / 60 / .268 / 47; 15 / Boston Celtics / 15 / 67 / .183 / 54; 1st seed in the East, best league record |
| Defeated the (8) Los Angeles Clippers, 3–0 | First round | Defeated the (8) Washington Bullets, 3–0 |
| Defeated the (4) Los Angeles Lakers, 4–1 | Conference semifinals | Defeated the (4) Atlanta Hawks, 4–1 |
| Defeated the (3) Houston Rockets, 4–2 | Conference finals | Defeated the (2) Miami Heat, 4–1 |

=== Regular season series ===
Both teams split the two meetings, each won by the home team:

November 23, 1996

Chicago Bulls 100, Utah Jazz 105

Delta Center, Salt Lake City

January 6, 1997

Utah Jazz 88, Chicago Bulls 102

United Center, Chicago, Illinois

Despite Michael Jordan scoring a game-high 44 points, the Jazz rallied with strong performances from Karl Malone (36 points, 15 rebounds) and John Stockton (12 points, 13 assists) and gave the Bulls' their first loss of the season on November 23 at the Delta Center.

== 1997 NBA Finals rosters ==
=== Chicago Bulls ===
1996–97 Chicago Bulls roster
Players

| Pos. | No. | Player | Height | Weight | DOB | From |
|---|---|---|---|---|---|---|
| PG | 1 | Randy Brown | 6 ft 2 in (1.88 m) | 190 lb (86 kg) | 1968–05–22 | New Mexico State |
| SF | 30 | Jud Buechler | 6 ft 6 in (1.98 m) | 220 lb (100 kg) | 1968–06–19 | Arizona |
| PF | 35 | Jason Caffey | 6 ft 8 in (2.03 m) | 255 lb (116 kg) | 1973–06–12 | Alabama |
| SG | 9 | Ron Harper | 6 ft 6 in (1.98 m) | 185 lb (84 kg) | 1964–01–20 | Miami (OH) |
| SG | 23 | Michael Jordan | 6 ft 6 in (1.98 m) | 195 lb (88 kg) | 1963–02–17 | North Carolina |
| PG | 25 | Steve Kerr | 6 ft 3 in (1.91 m) | 175 lb (79 kg) | 1965–09–27 | Arizona |
| SF | 7 | Toni Kukoč | 6 ft 10 in (2.08 m) | 192 lb (87 kg) | 1968–09–18 | Croatia |
| C | 13 | Luc Longley | 7 ft 2 in (2.18 m) | 265 lb (120 kg) | 1969–01–19 | New Mexico |
| C | 00 | Robert Parish | 7 ft 0 in (2.13 m) | 230 lb (104 kg) | 1953–08–30 | Centenary |
| SF | 33 | Scottie Pippen | 6 ft 8 in (2.03 m) | 210 lb (95 kg) | 1965–09–25 | Central Arkansas |
| PF | 91 | Dennis Rodman | 6 ft 7 in (2.01 m) | 210 lb (95 kg) | 1961–05–13 | SE Oklahoma State |
| PF | 8 | Dickey Simpkins | 6 ft 9 in (2.06 m) | 248 lb (112 kg) | 1972–04–06 | Providence |
| C | 34 | Bill Wennington (injured) | 7 ft 0 in (2.13 m) | 245 lb (111 kg) | 1963–04–26 | St. John's |
| C | 18 | Brian Williams | 6 ft 9 in (2.06 m) | 235 lb (107 kg) | 1969–04–06 | Arizona |

Coaches
Head coach
- Phil Jackson
Assistant(s)
- Tex Winter
- Bill Cartwright
- Jimmy Rodgers
- Frank Hamblen

Legend
- (DP) Unsigned draft pick
- (FA) Free agent
- (S) Suspended
- Injured

Roster

=== Utah Jazz ===
1996–97 Utah Jazz roster
Players

| Pos. | No. | Player | Height | Weight | DOB | From |
|---|---|---|---|---|---|---|
| SG | 40 | Shandon Anderson | 6 ft 6 in (1.98 m) | 208 lb (94 kg) | 1973–12–31 | Georgia |
| PF | 55 | Antoine Carr | 6 ft 9 in (2.06 m) | 225 lb (102 kg) | 1961–07–23 | Wichita State |
| PG | 10 | Howard Eisley | 6 ft 2 in (1.88 m) | 177 lb (80 kg) | 1972–12–04 | Boston College |
| C | 44 | Greg Foster | 6 ft 11 in (2.11 m) | 240 lb (109 kg) | 1968–10–03 | UTEP |
| SG | 14 | Jeff Hornacek | 6 ft 3 in (1.91 m) | 190 lb (86 kg) | 1963–05–03 | Iowa State |
| SF | 43 | Stephen Howard | 6 ft 9 in (2.06 m) | 225 lb (102 kg) | 1970–07–15 | DePaul |
| C | 31 | Adam Keefe | 6 ft 9 in (2.06 m) | 230 lb (104 kg) | 1970–02–22 | Stanford |
| PF | 32 | Karl Malone | 6 ft 9 in (2.06 m) | 250 lb (113 kg) | 1963–07–24 | Louisiana Tech |
| SF | 34 | Chris Morris | 6 ft 8 in (2.03 m) | 210 lb (95 kg) | 1966–01–20 | Auburn |
| C | 00 | Greg Ostertag | 7 ft 2 in (2.18 m) | 280 lb (127 kg) | 1973–03–06 | Kansas |
| SF | 3 | Bryon Russell | 6 ft 7 in (2.01 m) | 225 lb (102 kg) | 1970–12–31 | Long Beach State |
| PG | 12 | John Stockton | 6 ft 1 in (1.85 m) | 170 lb (77 kg) | 1962–03–26 | Gonzaga |

Coaches
Head coach
- Jerry Sloan
Assistant(s)
- Gordon Chiesa
- David Fredman
- Phil Johnson
- Kenny Natt

Legend
- (DP) Unsigned draft pick
- (FA) Free agent
- (S) Suspended
- Injured

Roster

== Series summary ==
| Game | Date | Road team | Result | Home team |
|---|---|---|---|---|
| Game 1 | June 1 | Utah Jazz | 82–84 (0–1) | Chicago Bulls |
| Game 2 | June 4 | Utah Jazz | 85–97 (0–2) | Chicago Bulls |
| Game 3 | June 6 | Chicago Bulls | 93–104 (2–1) | Utah Jazz |
| Game 4 | June 8 | Chicago Bulls | 73–78 (2–2) | Utah Jazz |
| Game 5 | June 11 | Chicago Bulls | 90–88 (3–2) | Utah Jazz |
| Game 6 | June 13 | Utah Jazz | 86–90 (2–4) | Chicago Bulls |

The Finals were played using a 2–3–2 site format, where the first two and last two games are held at the team with home court advantage's (Chicago's) home court (United Center).

Had the Western Conference finals between the Jazz and the Houston Rockets reached a game 7, the Finals would have started on Wednesday, June 4 and followed the similar Wednesday-Friday-Sunday rotation.

All times are in Eastern Daylight Time (UTC−4).

=== Game 1 ===
NBC

June 1
7:30 et

Recap at the Wayback Machine (archived September 2, 2000)

Utah Jazz 82, Chicago Bulls 84
Scoring by quarter: 18–17, 24–21, 22–24, 18–22
| Pts: Karl Malone 23; Rebs: Karl Malone 15; Asts: John Stockton 12 | Pts: Michael Jordan 31; Rebs: Dennis Rodman 12; Asts: Michael Jordan 8 |
Chicago leads the series, 1–0

United Center, Chicago, Illinois
Attendance: 24,544
Referees:
- No. 43 Danny Crawford
- No. 21 Bill Oakes
- No. 4 Ed T. Rush

Despite injuring his foot in the Eastern Conference finals against Miami, Scottie Pippen helped the Bulls to an 84–82 victory over Utah on Sunday. He scored 27 points while Jordan scored 31. The Bulls trailed by one in the 4th, yet were able to grab an 81–79 lead after Pippen blocked Antoine Carr, then made his third 3-pointer with 1:11 remaining. However, John Stockton answered with a 3 of his own with 51.7 seconds left to give Utah an 82–81 lead. Michael Jordan made 1 of 2 free throws with 35.8 seconds left to tie it at 82. Then, Karl Malone was fouled by Rodman with 9.2 seconds left and had a chance to give Utah the lead. Scottie famously psyched him out, saying, "Just remember, the mailman doesn't deliver on Sundays, Karl", before he stepped up to the line. He missed them both. Jordan got the rebound and quickly called a time-out with 7.5 seconds left. With the game on the line, the Bulls put the ball in Jordan's hands. He dribbled out most of the waning seconds, then launched a 20-footer (game-winning shot) that went in at the buzzer to give Chicago a 1–0 series lead, after which he pumped his fist in triumph. The fist-pumping often draws comparisons to another famous Jordan reaction to a buzzer-beater, when he leaped into the air after hitting The Shot that eliminated the Cleveland Cavaliers in Game 5 of the 1989 Eastern Conference quarterfinals.

Jordan joined Cliff Hagan in Game 6 in 1957, Jerry West in Game 3 in 1962, Larry Wright in Game 1 in 1979, and Dennis Johnson in Game 4 in 1985 as the only NBA Finals buzzer-beaters. To date, there has not been another buzzer-beating shot to win a Finals game.

=== Game 2 ===
NBC

June 4
9:00 ET

Recap at the Wayback Machine (archived February 10, 2001)

Utah Jazz 85, Chicago Bulls 97
Scoring by quarter: 20–25, 11–22, 28–31, 26–19
| Pts: Karl Malone 20; Rebs: Karl Malone 13; Asts: John Stockton 7 | Pts: Michael Jordan 38; Rebs: Michael Jordan 13; Asts: Michael Jordan 9 |
Chicago leads the series, 2–0

United Center, Chicago, Illinois
Attendance: 24,544
Referees:
- No. 25 Hugh Evans
- No. 29 Steve Javie
- No. 15 Bennett Salvatore

The Bulls simply dominated Game 2. After a hard-fought first quarter, the Bulls took control of the game with a 12–0 second-quarter run. Utah's 31 points in the first half was only one point above an NBA low. Karl Malone, who missed those two key free throws in Game 1, had another bad night, making only 6 of 20 field goals. Dennis Rodman nailed a late 3-pointer to put the Bulls up 97–85.

=== Game 3 ===
NBC

June 6
9:00 et

Recap at the Wayback Machine (archived February 8, 2001)

Chicago Bulls 93, Utah Jazz 104
Scoring by quarter: 22–31, 23–30, 15–16, 33–27
| Pts: Scottie Pippen 27; Rebs: Ron Harper 7 Asts: Michael Jordan 6 | Pts: Karl Malone 37; Rebs: Karl Malone 10; Asts: John Stockton 12 |
Chicago leads the series, 2–1

Delta Center, Salt Lake City, Utah
Attendance: 19,911
Referees:
- No. 17 Joey Crawford
- No. 42 Hue Hollins
- No. 35 Jack Nies

Utah's fans welcomed their proud Western Conference champs with force. During the introductions of the Jazz's starting lineups, the Bulls players plugged their ears, due to the loud cheers and fireworks within the Delta Center. The Chicago Bulls started off the first three quarters with mediocre play, despite Scottie Pippen tying a then-Finals record with seven 3-pointers. Utah was led by Karl Malone, who scored 37 points and had 10 rebounds. Chicago attempted a 4th-quarter comeback, cutting a 24-point deficit down to 7, but Utah ultimately won its first game of the series. With the Bulls trailing by 18 points in the second quarter, Michael Jordan threw down an alley-oop slam which drew loud boos from the crowd. Dennis Rodman defended his poor performance in Game 3 with a vulgar remark denigrating Mormons and was fined a then record $50,000 for this remark and CKE Restaurants dropped his television commercials permanently. He apologized, claiming he was not aware that Mormon referred to a religion and intended his remark at obnoxious Jazz fans.

=== Game 4 ===
NBC

June 8
7:30 et

Recap at the Wayback Machine (archived February 24, 1999)

Chicago Bulls 73, Utah Jazz 78
Scoring by quarter: 16–21, 24–14, 16–21, 17–22
| Pts: Michael Jordan 22; Rebs: Scottie Pippen 12; Asts: Jordan, Kukoč, Pippen 4 each | Pts: Karl Malone 23; Rebs: Karl Malone 10; Asts: John Stockton 12 |
Series tied, 2–2

Delta Center, Salt Lake City, Utah
Attendance: 19,911
Referees:
- No. 27 Dick Bavetta
- No. 45 Joe Forte
- No. 4 Ed T. Rush

Due to the extremely loud Jazz fans in Game 3, Bulls coach Phil Jackson wore a pair of ear plugs. A tight game with many lead changes throughout, the Jazz led by five after the first quarter, but trailed by five at halftime. The score was tied going into the fourth quarter. Late in the game, Michael Jordan made a fast break dunk to give the Bulls a 71–66 lead, but John Stockton buried a momentum-shifting three-pointer at the top of the key to cut the deficit to 71–69. Jordan made a jumper to give the Bulls a 73–69 lead with 2:01 remaining, but the Bulls would not score again. The Jazz pulled to within one when Stockton stole the ball from Jordan and made two free throws at the other end. On the next possession, Stockton grabbed a rebound from a Jordan miss and threw a full-court pass to Karl Malone for a layup with 44.5 seconds left that put Utah in front for good, 74–73. After Stockton made the assist, he jumped up into the air several times pumping his fist. After some Bulls misses, Karl Malone made two free throws with 17 seconds left to put the Jazz up by three. On the next possession, Michael Jordan's potential game-tying three-pointer with less than 10 seconds left rattled out; Stockton grabbed the rebound and threw another full-court pass to Bryon Russell, who escaped the intentional foul and dunked with five seconds left in the game to seal it, drawing a huge roar from the crowd. The Jazz's 12–2 run tied the series at two games apiece. The Delta Center grew so loud that during the final moments of the game when Bryon Russell made the dunk that iced the game, Marv Albert was unable to be clearly heard. The 78–73 score was one of the lowest scores in NBA Finals history. Jackson later wrote that the team's equipment manager "had mistakenly served our players Gaterlode, a high-carbohydrate drink, instead of Gatorade," making the team "sluggish... Each of the players, it was estimated, had ingested the equivalent of about twenty baked potatoes."

=== Game 5 ===
NBC

June 11
9:00 et

Recap at the Wayback Machine (archived February 10, 2001)

Chicago Bulls 90, Utah Jazz 88
Scoring by quarter: 16–29, 33–24, 18–19, 23–16
| Pts: Michael Jordan 38; Rebs: Scottie Pippen 10; Asts: Jordan, Pippen 5 each | Pts: Karl Malone 19; Rebs: Greg Ostertag 15; Asts: Karl Malone 6 |
Chicago leads the series, 3–2

Delta Center, Salt Lake City, Utah
Attendance: 19,911
Referees:
- No. 43 Danny Crawford
- No. 25 Hugh Evans
- No. 21 Bill Oakes

Game 5, known as "The Flu Game", was one of Michael Jordan's most memorable games. At 2:30 a.m. on Tuesday morning, Jordan woke up and began to experience vomiting and diarrhea, and called his personal trainer to his hotel room, where he was found lying curled up in the fetal position, shaking, and sweating profusely. He hardly had the strength to sit up in bed and requested a doctor. He was diagnosed with a stomach virus or food poisoning, likely caused by a pizza ordered the night before. Jordan eventually claimed it was food poisoning in the 2020 docuseries The Last Dance. The Bulls' athletic trainers told Jordan that there was no way he could play the next day, but Jordan insisted that he play. The Jazz were a perfect 10–0 at home in the postseason up until that point, and a third consecutive win would give them the series lead. The Bulls needed Jordan to assist them, as it was a critical game, and despite his sickness, Jordan got out of bed at 5:50 p.m. on Wednesday, just in time for the 7 o'clock tip-off at the Delta Center.

Jordan was weak as he stepped on the court for Game 5, and missed team warmups. At first, he displayed little energy, and John Stockton, along with reigning MVP Karl Malone, led the Jazz to a 16-point lead (36–20) in the second quarter. But Jordan slowly began to make shots despite lacking his usual speed. He scored 17 points in the quarter as the Bulls ended the half with a large run cutting the Jazz lead to four (53–49). While Jordan was fatigued in the third and sitting on the bench, Utah was able to reclaim the lead and stretched it to 8 points (77–69). Jordan shot well again in the fourth quarter, scoring 15 points. With 46.4 seconds left and Chicago down 85–84, he was fouled and went to the free throw line. He made the first to tie the game, but missed the second. Toni Kukoč got the offensive rebound to Jordan, who dribbled back to allow the offense to set up. He passed the ball to Pippen, who was quickly double-teamed. Pippen then passed the ball back to a now-unguarded Jordan, who made a 3-point shot to give the Bulls an 88–85 lead with 25 seconds remaining in the game. A Greg Ostertag dunk brought the Jazz back within one point, but Luc Longley answered with a dunk of his own, and Chicago held on for a victory when John Stockton missed the first of two free throws in front of the stunned crowd. With only a few seconds remaining and the game's result safely in Chicago's favor, Jordan collapsed into Scottie Pippen's arms, creating an iconic image that has come to symbolize The Flu Game.

Malone was the high-scorer for the Jazz with 19 points but shot poorly during the game, air-balling an off-balance shot on the possession prior to Jordan's 3-pointer. Malone finished the second half 1-for-6 from the field. Jordan played 44 minutes, finishing the game with 38 points, 7 rebounds, 5 assists, 3 steals and 1 block.

=== Game 6 ===
NBC

June 13
9:00 et

Recap at the Wayback Machine (archived February 10, 2001)

Utah Jazz 86, Chicago Bulls 90
Scoring by quarter: 23–17, 21–20, 26–27, 16–26
| Pts: Karl Malone 21; Rebs: Greg Ostertag 8 Asts: John Stockton 5 | Pts: Michael Jordan 39; Rebs: Jordan, Rodman 11 each Asts: Michael Jordan 4 |
Chicago wins the NBA Finals, 4–2

United Center, Chicago, Illinois
Attendance: 24,544
Referees:
- No. 17 Joey Crawford
- No. 29 Steve Javie
- No. 15 Bennett Salvatore

Michael Jordan hadn't fully recovered from his illness, but he was feeling much better and led the Bulls with 39 points. Chicago struggled in the first half, scoring just 37 points and making only 9 of 27 field goals. With the Bulls struggling in the third quarter, Jordan dunked after a steal, bringing the crowd to its feet and Jud Buechler buried a 3 to help give the Bulls the momentum. The Bulls trailed by 9 early in the fourth quarter, but went on a 10–0 run to take their first lead since the opening minutes when Steve Kerr hit a 3-pointer, but the Jazz regained the lead and the game remained one possession until the final score. In the final minutes, Jordan's fadeaway jumper extended the Bulls lead to 3, before Bryon Russell hit a 3-pointer with 1:44 left to tie the game at 86. The two teams failed to score on their next possessions. Shandon Anderson then missed a reverse layup. The Jazz argued that this was due to Pippen grabbing the rim before the shot, causing the basketball standard to shake. However, the officials ruled that the ball had no chance of going in. Dennis Rodman grabbed the rebound and called time-out with 28 seconds left in a tie game. The Jazz expected Jordan to take the final shot. Instead, Jordan drew a double-team, then passed to a wide-open Steve Kerr, who hit a 17-footer with 5 seconds left to send the United Center into a frenzy. The Jazz looked for a final shot to stay alive, but Scottie Pippen made a significant defensive play as he knocked away Bryon Russell's inbound pass intended for Shandon Anderson and rolled the ball over to Toni Kukoč, who dunked the final 2 points of the game before the roaring crowd to bring the Finals to an end, despite there being 0.6 seconds left in the game. Jordan finished with 39 points to go along with 11 rebounds and four assists, and he was named Finals MVP for the 5th time.

This would also be the last United Center championship celebration until eighteen years later when the NHL's Chicago Blackhawks beat the Tampa Bay Lightning to win the 2015 Stanley Cup.

== Player statistics ==
Legend
| GP | Games played | GS | Games started | MPG | Minutes per game |
| FG% | Field-goal percentage | 3P% | 3-point field-goal percentage | FT% | Free-throw percentage |
| RPG | Rebounds per game | APG | Assists per game | SPG | Steals per game |
| BPG | Blocks per game | PPG | Points per game |

Chicago Bulls

Chicago Bulls statistics
| Player | GP | GS | MPG | FG% | 3P% | FT% | RPG | APG | SPG | BPG | PPG |
|---|---|---|---|---|---|---|---|---|---|---|---|
| Randy Brown | 5 | 0 | 4.8 | .200 | .000 | 1.000 | 0.2 | 0.2 | 0.2 | 0.2 | 0.8 |
| Jud Buechler | 6 | 0 | 8.7 | .500 | .250 | .500 | 1.2 | 0.3 | 0.5 | 0.5 | 1.7 |
| Jason Caffey | 5 | 0 | 3.4 | .000 | .000 | .000 | 0.4 | 0.2 | 0.0 | 0.0 | 0.0 |
| Bison Dele | 6 | 0 | 20.2 | .472 | .000 | .538 | 3.3 | 0.8 | 1.0 | 0.2 | 6.8 |
| Ron Harper | 6 | 6 | 27.0 | .344 | .273 | .667 | 4.5 | 2.3 | 1.0 | 1.0 | 4.8 |
| Michael Jordan | 6 | 6 | 42.7 | .456 | .320 | .764 | 7.0 | 6.0 | 1.2 | 0.8 | 32.3 |
| Steve Kerr | 6 | 0 | 19.5 | .360 | .250 | 1.000 | 0.8 | 1.0 | 0.7 | 0.2 | 4.3 |
| Toni Kukoč | 6 | 0 | 23.3 | .405 | .556 | .800 | 3.2 | 2.7 | 0.2 | 0.0 | 8.0 |
| Luc Longley | 6 | 6 | 21.8 | .606 | .000 | .200 | 3.8 | 1.2 | 0.7 | 0.5 | 6.8 |
| Scottie Pippen | 6 | 6 | 42.8 | .421 | .375 | .778 | 8.3 | 3.5 | 1.7 | 1.8 | 20.0 |
| Dennis Rodman | 6 | 6 | 27.2 | .250 | .167 | .375 | 7.7 | 1.5 | 0.7 | 0.2 | 2.3 |

Utah Jazz

Utah Jazz statistics
| Player | GP | GS | MPG | FG% | 3P% | FT% | RPG | APG | SPG | BPG | PPG |
|---|---|---|---|---|---|---|---|---|---|---|---|
| Shandon Anderson | 4 | 0 | 21.0 | .316 | .250 | .667 | 1.8 | 0.5 | 1.0 | 0.0 | 4.3 |
| Antoine Carr | 6 | 0 | 9.8 | .409 | .000 | .000 | 1.7 | 0.8 | 0.0 | 0.0 | 3.0 |
| Howard Eisley | 6 | 0 | 10.5 | .500 | .500 | .900 | 0.7 | 2.5 | 0.2 | 0.0 | 5.3 |
| Greg Foster | 6 | 0 | 16.0 | .476 | .333 | .923 | 3.5 | 0.7 | 0.3 | 0.3 | 5.5 |
| Jeff Hornacek | 6 | 6 | 34.3 | .379 | .375 | .846 | 3.5 | 2.2 | 0.7 | 0.0 | 12.0 |
| Adam Keefe | 4 | 0 | 7.5 | .333 | .000 | .500 | 1.8 | 0.3 | 0.3 | 0.3 | 0.8 |
| Karl Malone | 6 | 6 | 40.8 | .443 | .000 | .603 | 10.3 | 3.5 | 1.7 | 0.3 | 23.8 |
| Chris Morris | 6 | 0 | 11.5 | .471 | .500 | .000 | 1.7 | 0.2 | 0.3 | 0.5 | 3.5 |
| Greg Ostertag | 6 | 6 | 21.8 | .400 | .000 | .500 | 7.3 | 0.3 | 0.5 | 1.5 | 4.3 |
| Bryon Russell | 6 | 6 | 38.7 | .390 | .441 | .875 | 5.8 | 0.7 | 0.8 | 0.2 | 11.3 |
| John Stockton | 6 | 6 | 37.5 | .500 | .400 | .846 | 4.0 | 8.8 | 2.0 | 0.5 | 15.0 |

== Broadcasting ==
Marv Albert was the play-by-play announcer for his seventh straight NBA Finals for the NBA on NBC. It was his third straight NBA Finals working with color analysts Matt Guokas and Bill Walton. This would be the last NBA Finals that Albert would announce in the 1990s because of a sex scandal that would force NBC Sports to fire him later in 1997.

During these NBA Finals, NBC Sports' Hannah Storm became the first woman to serve as pre-game host of an NBA Finals. She would continue in this role for the next three NBA Finals.

NBC Sports also used Ahmad Rashad (Bulls sideline) and Jim Gray (Jazz sideline) as the sideline reporters.

This would be the only NBA Finals on NBC during the 1990s that would not include Bob Costas in any capacity. He had served as the pre-game host from 1991 to 1996. The next year, during the 1998 NBA Finals, Costas served as the play-by-play announcer, a role in which he would continue until after the 2000 NBA Finals.

The local NBC affiliates of the participating teams included WMAQ-TV (Chicago) and KSL-TV (Salt Lake City).

== Aftermath ==
Both teams met again in the Finals in 1998, the first time the same two teams met in the NBA Finals since 1989, when the Lakers and Pistons went up against each other. Only this time, the Jazz had home-court advantage. The Bulls won that series in 6 games, highlighted by Michael Jordan's last shot as a Bull in Game 6.

"I just kind of whispered in his ear that the Mailman doesn't deliver on Sunday"

— Scottie Pippen telling reporters after the game what he said to Karl Malone (nicknamed the Mailman) before crucial free throws in Game 1.

Nationally, Karl Malone, the MVP of the league in the regular season, was criticized heavily for a subpar NBA Finals. Dennis Rodman and Brian Williams forced Malone into taking more jump shots than he had in any playoff series in his career to that point. In the 1997 Finals, Malone shot 44% compared to 53% in the regular season and 60% at the free throw line compared to 78%. In Game 1, Malone missed 2 free throws with 9 seconds left, which left Michael Jordan to hit the game winner. In Game 5, he went 7-for-17 from the floor and 5-for-9 at the free throw line for 19 points in a Jazz two-point loss. In Game 6, he went 7-for-15 from both the field and free throw line in what turned out to be a close four-point loss. Directly after the Bulls' Game 6 clincher, Malone was interviewed by NBC analyst Peter Vecsey, who aggressively pressed Malone about his poor series and asked if he felt like he let his team down. To Malone's credit, he took full blame and stated he did not feel like he let his team down.

This was the only Bulls' championship Brian Williams was a part of. In 1998, Williams changed his name to Bison Dele to honor his Native American (Cherokee) and African ancestry. At the age of 30, he retired after the 1998–99 season, walking away from the remaining five years and US$36.45 million on his contract with the Detroit Pistons rather than be traded. In 2002, Dele, his girlfriend Serena Karlan, and boat captain Bertrand Saldo were killed by his Dele's brother, Miles Dabord, after the two got into an argument aboard Dele's boat near Tahiti across the Pacific Ocean.
