= 2001–02 Phoenix Suns season =

NBA team season

- Head coach: Scott Skiles (resigned); Frank Johnson
- General manager: Bryan Colangelo
- Owner: Jerry Colangelo
- Arena: America West Arena

Results
- Record: 36–46 (.439)
- Place: Division: 6th (Pacific); Conference: 10th (Western)
- Playoff finish: Did not qualify
- Stats at Basketball Reference

Local media
- Television: KUTP; Fox Sports Net Arizona; Cox 9
- Radio: KTAR

The 2001–02 Phoenix Suns season was the 34th season for the Phoenix Suns in the National Basketball Association.

== Season summary ==
=== Off-season ===
During the off-season, the Suns acquired All-Star point guard Stephon Marbury from the New Jersey Nets, re-signed former All-Star Suns guard and three-point specialist Dan Majerle, who was a member of the team when they appeared in the 1993 NBA Finals, acquired second-year center Jake Voskuhl from the Chicago Bulls, and acquired John Wallace and Jud Buechler from the Detroit Pistons.

=== Regular season ===
Early into the regular season, the Suns traded Buechler to the Orlando Magic in exchange for Bo Outlaw in a three-team trade in November. With the addition of Marbury and Majerle, and with Penny Hardaway back after only appearing in just four games the previous season due to a knee injury, the Suns lost three of their first four games of the regular season, but soon recovered by posting a five-game winning streak between November and December, and holding an 18–13 record at the end of December. However, the team soon struggled and fell below .500 in winning percentage by posting a five-game losing streak soon afterwards, and later on holding a 24–24 record at the All-Star break.

Head coach Scott Skiles resigned after a 25–26 start to the season, and was replaced with assistant coach, and former Suns guard Frank Johnson. Meanwhile, the Suns traded Rodney Rogers, and Tony Delk to the Boston Celtics in exchange for rookie shooting guard, and first-round draft pick Joe Johnson, and Randy Brown in a mid-season trade. Under Frank Johnson, the Suns posted a six-game losing streak in March, and lost eight of their final eleven games of the season, finishing in sixth place in the Pacific Division with a disappointing 36–46 record; the team failed to qualify for the NBA playoffs for the first time since the 1987–88 season.

Marbury averaged 20.4 points and 8.1 assists per game, while Shawn Marion averaged 19.1 points, 9.9 rebounds and 1.8 steals per game, and Hardaway provided the team with 12.0 points, 4.1 assists and 1.5 steals per game. In addition, Joe Johnson contributed 9.6 points and 3.6 assists per game in 27 games after the trade, and was named to the NBA All-Rookie Second Team, while second-year center Jake Tsakalidis provided with 7.3 points and 5.6 rebounds per game, and Tom Gugliotta averaged 6.5 points and 5.0 rebounds per game, but continued to struggle with knee injuries, as he only appeared in just 44 games due to left quadriceps tendonitis. Meanwhile, Voskuhl averaged 5.0 points and 4.3 rebounds per game, Wallace contributed 5.0 points per game, Outlaw provided with 4.7 points and 4.6 rebounds per game, and Majerle contributed 4.6 points per game, but shot just .343 in field-goal percentage.

The Suns finished 17th in the NBA in home-game attendance, with an attendance of 668,939 at the America West Arena during the regular season. This season was a disappointment for an organization looking to build a new core of talent. For the first time since the 1996–97 season, the NBA All-Star Game did not feature a Suns player. To complete the season on a low note, a franchise-record of thirteen consecutive NBA playoff appearances ended when the Suns failed to qualify for the postseason.

=== Aftermath ===
Following the season, Majerle retired after playing in his second stint with the Suns, and Wallace was released to free agency.

== Offseason ==
=== NBA draft ===
Round	Pick	Player	Position	Nationality	College / Club Team
2	51	Alton Ford	Center	United States	Houston

== Roster ==
2001–02 Phoenix Suns roster
Players

Pos.	No.	Player	Height	Weight	DOB	From
G	0	Randy Brown (injured) (IN)	6 ft 2 in (1.88 m)	190 lb (86 kg)	1968–05–22	New Mexico State
G	11	Joe Crispin	6 ft 0 in (1.83 m)	185 lb (84 kg)	1979–07–18	Penn State
F	4	Alton Ford	6 ft 9 in (2.06 m)	275 lb (125 kg)	1981–05–29	Houston
F	24	Tom Gugliotta (injured)	6 ft 10 in (2.08 m)	240 lb (109 kg)	1969–12–19	NC State
G	1	Penny Hardaway	6 ft 7 in (2.01 m)	195 lb (88 kg)	1971–07–18	Memphis
G	2	Joe Johnson	6 ft 8 in (2.03 m)	225 lb (102 kg)	1981–06–29	Arkansas
G	9	Dan Majerle	6 ft 6 in (1.98 m)	222 lb (101 kg)	1965–09–09	Central Michigan
G	3	Stephon Marbury	6 ft 2 in (1.88 m)	180 lb (82 kg)	1977–02–20	Georgia Tech
F	31	Shawn Marion	6 ft 7 in (2.01 m)	220 lb (100 kg)	1978–05–07	UNLV
F	45	Bo Outlaw	6 ft 8 in (2.03 m)	210 lb (95 kg)	1971–04–13	Houston
G	10	Milt Palacio	6 ft 3 in (1.91 m)	195 lb (88 kg)	1978–02–07	Colorado State
C	25	Jake Tsakalidis	7 ft 2 in (2.18 m)	285 lb (129 kg)	1979–06–10	Georgia (country)
C	43	Jake Voskuhl	6 ft 11 in (2.11 m)	245 lb (111 kg)	1977–11–01	Connecticut
F	22	John Wallace	6 ft 8 in (2.03 m)	225 lb (102 kg)	1974–02–09	Syracuse

Coaches
Head coach
- Scott Skiles (resigned)
- Frank Johnson
Assistant(s)
- Al Bianchi
- Jim Boylan
- Robin Pound
- Phil Weber

Legend
- (DP) Unsigned draft pick
- (FA) Free agent
- (S) Suspended
- (IN) Inactive
- Injured

Roster
Updated: February 20, 2002

=== Roster notes ===
- Point guard Randy Brown was acquired by the Suns from the Boston Celtics in a mid-season trade, but was placed on the injured reserve list due to a right adductor strain, and did not play for the Suns this season.

== Regular season ==
=== Standings ===
Pacific Division	W	L	PCT	GB	Home	Road	Div
y-Sacramento Kings	61	21	.744	–	36–5	25–16	15–9
x-Los Angeles Lakers	58	24	.707	3	34–7	24–17	16–8
x-Portland Trail Blazers	49	33	.598	12	30–11	19–22	14–10
x-Seattle SuperSonics	45	37	.549	16	26–15	19–22	13–11
e-Los Angeles Clippers	39	43	.476	22	25–16	14–27	9–15
e-Phoenix Suns	36	46	.439	25	23–18	13–28	12–12
e-Golden State Warriors	21	61	.256	40	14–27	7–34	5–19

#	Western Conference				
#	Team	W	L	PCT	GB
1	z-Sacramento Kings	61	21	.744	–
2	y-San Antonio Spurs	58	24	.707	3
3	x-Los Angeles Lakers	58	24	.707	3
4	x-Dallas Mavericks	57	25	.695	4
5	x-Minnesota Timberwolves	50	32	.610	11
6	x-Portland Trail Blazers	49	33	.598	12
7	x-Seattle SuperSonics	45	37	.549	16
8	x-Utah Jazz	44	38	.537	17
9	e-Los Angeles Clippers	39	43	.476	22
10	e-Phoenix Suns	36	46	.439	25
11	e-Houston Rockets	28	54	.341	33
12	e-Denver Nuggets	27	55	.329	34
13	e-Memphis Grizzlies	23	59	.280	38
14	e-Golden State Warriors	21	61	.256	40

== Awards and honors ==
=== Week/Month ===
- Shawn Marion was named Western Conference Player of the Month for March.
- Stephon Marbury was named Western Conference Player of the Week for games played November 26 through December 2.
- Shawn Marion was named Western Conference Player of the Week for games played March 25 through March 31.

=== Season ===
- Joe Johnson was named to the NBA All-Rookie Second Team.

== Player statistics ==
Legend
GP	Games played	GS	Games started	MPG	Minutes per game
FG%	Field-goal percentage	3P%	3-point field-goal percentage	FT%	Free-throw percentage
RPG	Rebounds per game	APG	Assists per game	SPG	Steals per game
BPG	Blocks per game	PPG	Points per game

=== Season ===
Player	GP	GS	MPG	FG%	3P%	FT%	RPG	APG	SPG	BPG	PPG
Charlie Bell*	5	0	8.4	.273	.000	1.000#	0.8	0.4	.0	.0	1.6
Jud Buechler*	6	0	9.0	.333	.333	.	1.3	0.5	.2	.0	1.0
Joe Crispin*	15	0	8.6	.411	.429^	1.000#	0.7	1.6	.3	.0	4.6
Vinny Del Negro	2	0	3.0	.250	.	.	0.0	1.0	.0	.0	1.0
Tony Delk*	41	1	21.4	.399	.320	.836	3.0	2.0	.8	.1	10.6
Alton Ford	53	0	8.5	.517†	.	.737	2.0	0.1	.1	.1	3.1
Tom Gugliotta	44	40	25.7	.422	.333	.757	5.0	1.8	.9	.7	6.5
Penny Hardaway	80	56	30.8	.418	.277	.810	4.4	4.1	1.5	.4	12.0
Joe Johnson*	29	27	31.5	.420	.333	.778	4.1	3.6	.9	.4	9.6
Dan Majerle	65	1	18.2	.343	.336^	.590	2.7	1.4	.7	.2	4.6
Stephon Marbury	82	80	38.9	.442	.286	.781	3.2	8.1	.9	.2	20.4
Shawn Marion	81	81	38.4	.469†	.393^	.845#	9.9	2.0	1.8	1.1	19.1
Bo Outlaw*	73	36	24.2	.550†	.500^	.417	4.6	1.7	.8	1.1	4.7
Milt Palacio*	28	1	9.7	.380	.143	.783	0.8	1.0	.3	.0	2.8
Rodney Rogers*	50	7	25.1	.466	.350^	.828	4.8	1.4	1.0	.3	12.6
Daniel Santiago	3	0	8.0	.500†	.	.	2.3	0.7	.0	.3	2.7
Jake Tsakalidis	67	47	23.6	.475†	.000	.698	5.6	0.3	.3	1.0	7.3
Jake Voskuhl	59	34	15.3	.554†	.	.752	4.3	0.3	.2	.4	5.0
John Wallace	46	0	10.7	.435	.385^	.870#	1.8	0.6	.2	.2	5.0

* – Stats with the Suns.
† – Minimum 300 field goals made.
^ – Minimum 55 three-pointers made.
# – Minimum 125 free throws made.

Player statistics citation:

== Transactions ==
=== Trades ===
July 18, 2001	To Detroit Pistons (United States) Clifford Robinson	To Phoenix Suns (United States) Jud Buechler (United States) John Wallace $1.6 million trade exception
July 18, 2001	To New Jersey Nets (United States) Chris Dudley (United States) Jason Kidd	To Phoenix Suns (United States) Stephon Marbury (United States) Johnny Newman (Mali) Soumaila Samake
October 29, 2001	To Chicago Bulls (Mali) Soumaila Samake 2003 second-round draft pick ( (United States) Matt Bonner)	To Phoenix Suns (United States) Jake Voskuhl
November 15, 2001	To Orlando Magic (United States) Jud Buechler	To Phoenix Suns (United States) Bo Outlaw 2002 first-round draft pick ( (United States) Amar'e Stoudemire)
November 15, 2001	To Los Angeles Clippers (United States) Vinny Del Negro Cash considerations
February 20, 2002	To Boston Celtics (United States) Tony Delk (United States) Rodney Rogers	To Phoenix Suns (United States) Randy Brown (United States) Joe Johnson (Belize) Milt Palacio 2002 first-round draft pick ( (United States) Casey Jacobsen)

=== Free agents ===
==== Additions ====
Date	Player	Contract	Former Team
July 6, 2001	Charlie Bell	Undisclosed	Michigan State Spartans
July 19, 2001	Dan Majerle	Signed to 1-year contract for $1 million	Miami Heat
August 29, 2001	Daniel Santiago	Re-signed to 1-year contract for $465,850	Phoenix Suns
September 27, 2001	Chris Andersen	Undisclosed	Fayetteville Patriots (NBA DL)
September 27, 2001	Dan McClintock	Undisclosed	Denver Nuggets
September 27, 2001	Derek Hood	Undisclosed	Snaidero Udine (Italy)
September 27, 2001	Kendrick Johnson	Undisclosed	
January 7, 2002	Joe Crispin	Signed for rest of season	Southern California Surf (ABA)

==== Subtractions ====
Date	Player	Reason left	New team
September 28, 2001	Johnny Newman	Waived	Dallas Mavericks
October 7, 2001	Chris Andersen	Waived	Denver Nuggets
October 9, 2001	Dan McClintock	Waived	Skipper Bologna
October 11, 2001	Kendrick Johnson	Waived	
October 20, 2001	Derek Hood	Waived	Mobile Revelers (NBA DL)
December 11, 2001	Charlie Bell	Waived	Phoenix Eclipse (ABA)
January 7, 2002	Daniel Santiago	Waived	Lottomatica Roma (Italy)

Player Transactions Citation:

== See also ==
- 2001–02 NBA season
