= Jason Caffey =

American former professional basketball player (born 1973)

Personal information
- Born: June 12, 1973 (age 53) Mobile, Alabama, U.S.
- Listed height: 6 ft 8 in (2.03 m)
- Listed weight: 256 lb (116 kg)

Career information
- High school: Davidson (Mobile, Alabama)
- College: Alabama (1991–1995)
- NBA draft: 1995: 1st round, 20th overall pick
- Drafted by: Chicago Bulls
- Playing career: 1995–2003
- Position: Power forward
- Number: 35, 21

Career history
- 1995–1998: Chicago Bulls
- 1998–2000: Golden State Warriors
- 2000–2003: Milwaukee Bucks

Career highlights
- 2× NBA champion (1996, 1997)

Career NBA statistics
- Points: 3,368 (7.3 ppg)
- Rebounds: 2,022 (4.4 rpg)
- Assists: 420 (0.9 apg)
- Stats at NBA.com
- Stats at Basketball Reference

Jason Andre Caffey (born June 12, 1973) is an American former professional basketball player who won two NBA championships with the Chicago Bulls in the 1990s. He later became the head coach of the American Basketball Association's Mobile Bay Hurricanes.

== Basketball career ==
Caffey was born in Mobile, Alabama and played basketball at Davidson High School, where he earned 1st team All State in Class 6A and was named Gatorade's choice for state Player Of The Year. The 6'8" power forward went on to play 4 years at the University of Alabama under coach Wimp Sanderson, and was selected by the Chicago Bulls with the 20th pick of the 1995 NBA draft. He averaged 7.3 points per game during the Bulls' second consecutive championship run in 1996–97. He started 5 playoff games this year, making him one of eleven Chicago Bulls players to start a playoff game amid their championship runs.

Before Caffey could win a third NBA championship with the Bulls, he was traded to the Golden State Warriors on February 19, 1998, in exchange for David Vaughn and two second round draft picks. This transaction was not well received by some of the Bulls' top players, with Michael Jordan stating that "Every time I've seen him (David Vaughn), he's never been in uniform. I think that says a lot," and Dennis Rodman calling it a "dumb" move. Before the beginning of the 1998-99 NBA season, Caffey re-signed with the Warriors on a 7-year, $35 million contract. He averaged career highs of 12.0 points and 6.8 rebounds during the 1999–2000 season with the Warriors.

Caffey joined the Milwaukee Bucks on June 27, 2000, with whom he played three more seasons before his career fizzled out amidst a series of personal problems, including an anxiety attack in 2002 and an assault charge in 2003. The Bucks bought out the remaining two seasons ($11.8 million) of his contract before the 2003–04 season started.

On June 18, 2010, Caffey was named head coach of the American Basketball Association expansion team, the Mobile Bay Hurricanes.

== Career statistics ==
Legend
GP	Games played	GS	Games started	MPG	Minutes per game
FG%	Field goal percentage	3P%	3-point field goal percentage	FT%	Free throw percentage
RPG	Rebounds per game	APG	Assists per game	SPG	Steals per game
BPG	Blocks per game	PPG	Points per game	**Bold**	Career high
†	Won an NBA championship

=== Regular season ===
Year	Team	GP	GS	MPG	FG%	3P%	FT%	RPG	APG	SPG	BPG	PPG
1995–96†	Chicago	57	0	9.6	.438	.000	.588	1.9	0.4	0.2	0.1	3.2
1996–97†	Chicago	**75**	19	18.7	**.532**	.000	.659	4.0	1.2	0.3	0.1	7.3
1997–98	Chicago	51	8	13.9	.503	.000	.660	3.4	0.7	0.3	0.3	5.3
1997–98	Golden State	29	6	24.6	.472	.000	.649	5.9	1.1	0.4	0.1	10.9
1998–99	Golden State	35	32	25.0	.444	.000	.633	5.9	0.5	0.7	0.3	8.8
1999–2000	Golden State	71	**56**	**30.4**	.479	.000	.597	**6.8**	**1.7**	**0.9**	0.3	**12.0**
2000–01	Milwaukee	70	33	20.9	.488	.000	**.673**	5.0	0.8	0.5	**0.4**	7.1
2001–02	Milwaukee	23	0	12.3	.500	.000	.628	2.2	0.5	0.2	0.2	4.3
2002–03	Milwaukee	51	16	17.5	.456	.000	.651	3.5	0.7	0.4	0.3	5.8
Career		462	170	19.6	.481	.000	.637	4.4	0.9	0.5	0.2	7.3

=== Playoffs ===
Year	Team	GP	GS	MPG	FG%	3P%	FT%	RPG	APG	SPG	BPG	PPG
1997†	Chicago	17	**5**	9.8	**.455**	.000	**.786**	2.5	**0.9**	**0.2**	0.2	2.4
2001	Milwaukee	**18**	0	**16.5**	.381	.000	.645	**4.1**	0.8	**0.2**	**0.3**	**3.8**
Career		35	5	13.3	.406	.000	.689	3.3	0.8	0.2	0.2	3.1

== Political career ==
Caffey announced in July 2021 that he would run for the city council district 2 seat in Mobile, Alabama.

== Legal troubles ==
On May 25, 2010, Caffey was arrested and charged with third-degree domestic violence in Mobile, Alabama for hitting and kicking a woman.

Caffey has fathered 10 children with 8 mothers and has been sued in multiple child support lawsuits.

== Personal life ==
Caffrey is the cousin of professional wrestler Tiana Caffey, better known as Jaida Parker in NXT.
