= Scott Burrell =

American basketball player and coach (born 1971)

Southern Connecticut Owls
- Title: Head coach
- League: Northeast-10 Conference

Personal information
- Born: January 12, 1971 (age 55) New Haven, Connecticut, U.S.
- Listed height: 6 ft 7 in (2.01 m)
- Listed weight: 218 lb (99 kg)

Career information
- High school: Hamden (Hamden, Connecticut)
- College: UConn (1989–1993)
- NBA draft: 1993: 1st round, 20th overall pick
- Drafted by: Charlotte Hornets
- Playing career: 1993–2006
- Position: Shooting guard / small forward
- Number: 24, 23, 2
- Coaching career: 2006–present

Career history

Playing
- 1993–1997: Charlotte Hornets
- 1997: Golden State Warriors
- 1997–1998: Chicago Bulls
- 1999–2000: New Jersey Nets
- 2001: Charlotte Hornets
- 2001–2002: Fayetteville Patriots
- 2002–2003: Shaanxi Gaitianli Kylins
- 2003–2004: Red Bull Barako
- 2004–2005: Idaho Stampede
- 2005: Bilbao Berri
- 2005–2006: Hitachi SunRockers

Coaching
- 2006–2007: Colorado 14ers (assistant)
- 2007–2015: Quinnipiac (assistant)
- 2015–present: Southern Connecticut

Career highlights
- As player: NBA champion (1998); Second-team All-Big East (1992); 2× Third-team All-Big East (1991, 1993); As head coach: Northeast-10 Southwest Division champion (2016); ECAC Coach of the Year (2016)

Career NBA statistics
- Points: 2,649 (6.9 ppg)
- Rebounds: 1,332 (3.5 rpg)
- Assists: 527 (1.4 apg)
- Stats at NBA.com
- Stats at Basketball Reference

Scott David Burrell (born January 12, 1971) is an American basketball coach and former player who is currently the men's basketball head coach at Southern Connecticut State University. He has played internationally and was also a professional baseball player, being the first athlete to ever be drafted in the 1st round of two professional leagues (MLB, NBA). In 1990, Burrell was drafted by the Toronto Blue Jays of MLB. He played in Minor League Baseball during the 1990 and 1991 seasons. After ending his baseball career, he was drafted in 1993 by the Charlotte Hornets of the NBA. He was later traded to the Golden State Warriors and then the Chicago Bulls, where he won a championship ring. He next played with the New Jersey Nets and then finished his NBA career with the Hornets in 2000–01. He played in other professional basketball leagues through the 2005–06 season.

== Early life ==
Born in New Haven, Connecticut, Burrell was raised in nearby Hamden and attended Hamden High School. At Hamden High, in addition to basketball, Burrell was a quarterback on the football team and pitcher on the baseball team. Burrell was named to the ABCA/Rawlings High School All-America Second Team as a senior in 1989. He was drafted by the Seattle Mariners in the first round of the 1989 Major League Baseball draft after graduating from high school. Burrell initially planned on attending the University of Miami to play baseball, before University of Connecticut assistant basketball coach Howie Dickenman convinced Burrell to commit to Connecticut.

== College career ==
From 1989 to 1993, Burrell played at guard and forward for the Connecticut Huskies under Jim Calhoun. As a freshman in 1989–90, Burrell averaged 8.2 points and 5.5 rebounds. In 1990, Burrell was drafted by another baseball team, the Toronto Blue Jays, and Burrell spent the next two summers playing minor league baseball.

As a junior in 1991–92, Burrell averaged a career high 16.3 points, and he had a career high 7.5 rebounds in 1990–91. Burrell became the first player in NCAA basketball history to compile over 1,500 points, 750 rebounds, 275 assists and 300 steals. Burrell is known for his full-court pass with one second on the clock to Tate George, who hit a shot as time expired to beat Clemson in the East Regional semi-final of the 1990 NCAA Division I men's basketball tournament.

Burrell went back to school and received his bachelor's degree in general studies from the University of Connecticut on May 8, 2010.

== Professional career ==
=== Minor league baseball (1990–1991) ===
After being drafted by the Toronto Blue Jays in the fifth round of the 1990 Major League Baseball draft, Burrell was a minor league baseball pitcher from 1990 to 1991, first with the St. Catharines Blue Jays in 1990 and splitting the 1991 season between the Myrtle Beach Hurricanes and St. Catharines Blue Jays. Burrell had a 3.71 ERA and 2–6 record as a minor league pitcher.

=== Charlotte Hornets (1993–1997) ===
Burrell was selected by the Charlotte Hornets with the 20th overall pick in the 1993 NBA draft.

He averaged 4.8 points per game during his rookie season, during which he missed 31 games due to knee, ankle, and Achilles tendon injuries. In the 1994–95 season, Burrell played in 65 games with 62 starts and averaged 11.5 points and 5.7 rebounds. Despite a season ending injury on April 1, 1995, Burrell finished third in NBA Most Improved Player Award votes. On February 11, he also finished third at the AT&T Long-Distance Shootout. During the 1995–96 NBA season, Burrell was limited to 20 games due to injuries, including Achilles tendon surgery. After that season, Burrell would play mostly off the bench.

=== Later NBA career (1997–2001) ===
On February 20, 1997, the Hornets traded Burrell to the Golden State Warriors for Donald Royal. Burrell averaged 5.9 points overall in 1996–97. On September 22, 1997, the Warriors traded Burrell to the Chicago Bulls for Dickey Simpkins. Bulls general manager Jerry Krause sought Burrell for his ability to play both forward spots. During the season, in which the Bulls won the NBA championship, Burrell played 80 games with three starts and averaged 5.2 points and 2.5 rebounds. On February 2, 1998, Burrell scored a season high 24 points in 18 minutes in a 111–72 victory over the Denver Nuggets. The Last Dance, a 2020 ESPN and Netflix documentary series on Burrell's Bulls teammate Michael Jordan, depicts Burrell as a common target of Jordan's competitive banter. Burrell contributed to the Bulls’ success that season by guarding Jordan in practice. His athleticism made him a good match for Jordan.

Shortly after the 1998–99 NBA lockout ended, the Bulls released Burrell on January 25, 1999. Burrell signed as a free agent with the New Jersey Nets nearly a week later on February 3; he would average 6.6 points in 1999 and 6.1 points in 1999–2000 with the Nets. Burrell had successful hand and knee surgery on April 27, 2000.

On April 10, 2001, Burrell returned to the Charlotte Hornets, where he played four games off the bench in what would be his final NBA season.

=== NBDL and overseas career (2001–2006) ===
Burrell signed with National Basketball Development League (NBDL, now NBA G League) team Fayetteville Patriots on March 8, 2002. In six games with five starts, Burrell averaged 5.5 points and 3.7 rebounds in his only NBDL season.

After leaving the NBDL, Burrell finished much of his professional basketball career internationally, starting with the Shaanxi Kylins of the Chinese Basketball Association where he averaged 18.0 points and 6.2 rebounds in 2002–03. In 2003–04, Burrell played for the Batang Thunder of the Philippine Basketball Association, averaging 25.1 points and 5.0 rebounds.

Burrell returned to the U.S. signing with the Idaho Stampede of the Continental Basketball Association on November 30, 2004. Burrell played 14 games for the Stampede, averaging 6.9 points and 3.9 rebounds. In 2005, Burrell signed with Bilbao Basket of the Spanish Liga ACB, where he played eight games and averaged 5.0 points. On January 24, 2005, Burrell signed with the Hitachi Sunrockers of the Japanese JBL Super League. Burrell averaged 6.2 points in his final pro basketball season with Hitachi in 2005–06.

== Coaching career ==
In the 2006–07 season, Burrell was an assistant coach for the Colorado 14ers of the NBA D-League (now G League).

On August 17, 2007, Burrell became an assistant coach for the Quinnipiac Bobcats men's basketball team at Quinnipiac University in his hometown of Hamden, Connecticut, under former UConn assistant coach Tom Moore. Burrell helped Quinnipiac win the regular season Northeast Conference title and qualify for the NIT in the 2009–10 season.

On July 13, 2015, Burrell was hired as head men's basketball coach at Southern Connecticut State University, a Division II school in New Haven. Inheriting a 24–8 team from former head coach Mike Donnelly, Burrell led the Southern Connecticut Fighting Owls to a 22–8 (17–3 conference) record, Northeast-10 Conference Southwest Division title, and NCAA tournament appearance in his first season; as a result of this success, Burrell earned Eastern College Athletic Conference Coach of the Year honors. Burrell followed up with an 18–13 record and second straight NCAA tournament under his tenure (fourth overall for the program) in 2016–17.

As of the 2019–20 season, Burrell has a 91–56 cumulative record at Southern Connecticut .

=== Head coaching record ===
Record table
Season	Team	Overall	Conference	Standing	Postseason
Southern Connecticut Fighting Owls (Northeast-10 Conference) (2015–present)
2015–16	Southern Connecticut	22–8	17–3	1st (Southwest)	NCAA Division II first round
2016–17	Southern Connecticut	18–13	13–7	3rd (Southwest)	NCAA Division II second round
2017–18	Southern Connecticut	16–12	11–9	4th (Southwest)	
2018–19	Southern Connecticut	19–12	12–8	4th (Southwest)	
2019–20	Southern Connecticut	16–11	11–8	T–2nd (Southwest)	No postseason held
2021–22	Southern Connecticut	7-18	4-14	13th	
2022–23	Southern Connecticut	18-12	11-9	T–4th	NE10 Tournament Quarterfinals
2023–24	Southern Connecticut	22-11	13-9	T–3rd	NCAA Division II first round
2024–25	Southern Connecticut	17-11	12-9	3rd	NE10 Tournament Quartfinals
2025–26	Southern Connecticut	11-15	7-11	6th	
Southern Connecticut:		166–123 (.574)	111–87 (.561)		
Total:		166–123 (.574)			
National champion Postseason invitational champion Conference regular season champion Conference regular season and conference tournament champion Division regular season champion Division regular season and conference tournament champion Conference tournament champion

== Personal life ==
Following the Chicago Bulls' 1998 championship, Connecticut Governor John G. Rowland issued a proclamation of October 20, 1998 as "Scott Burrell Day," after the town of Hamden presented Burrell with a "key to the city." Burrell is married to SportsNet New York reporter Jeané Coakley. They have two children. His niece is the USA Eagles women's Rugby Union Lock Alycia Washington.

== Career statistics ==
Legend
GP	Games played	GS	Games started	MPG	Minutes per game
FG%	Field goal percentage	3P%	3-point field goal percentage	FT%	Free throw percentage
RPG	Rebounds per game	APG	Assists per game	SPG	Steals per game
BPG	Blocks per game	PPG	Points per game	**Bold**	Career high
†	Won an NBA championship

=== NBA ===
==== Regular season ====
Year	Team	GP	GS	MPG	FG%	3P%	FT%	RPG	APG	SPG	BPG	PPG
1993–94	Charlotte	51	16	15.0	.419	.333	.657	2.6	1.2	.7	.3	4.8
1994–95	Charlotte	65	**62**	31.0	**.467**	**.409**	.694	**5.7**	**2.5**	1.2	.6	11.5
1995–96	Charlotte	20	20	**34.7**	.447	.378	.750	4.9	2.4	**1.4**	**.7**	**13.2**
1996–97	Charlotte	28	2	17.2	.344	.345	.792	2.8	1.4	.5	.4	5.4
1996–97	Golden State	29	0	15.8	.379	.361	.652	2.7	1.2	.5	.3	4.9
1997–98†	Chicago	**80**	3	13.7	.424	.354	.734	2.5	.8	.8	.5	5.2
1998–99	New Jersey	32	0	22.1	.361	.389	**.810**	3.7	1.4	1.3	.3	6.6
1999–2000	New Jersey	74	9	18.1	.394	.353	.780	3.5	1.0	.9	.6	6.1
2000–01	Charlotte	4	0	10.3	**.467**	.333	.250	.8	.3	.8	.0	4.3
Career		383	122	19.8	.418	.373	.723	3.5	1.4	.9	.5	6.9

==== Playoffs ====
Year	Team	GP	GS	MPG	FG%	3P%	FT%	RPG	APG	SPG	BPG	PPG
1998†	Chicago	**21**	0	**12.4**	.438	**.300**	**.909**	**2.0**	**.5**	.9	**.1**	**3.8**
2001	Charlotte	2	0	6.0	**.667**	0	.500	1.5	**.5**	**1.0**	.0	2.5
Career		23	0	11.9	.447	.286	.846	2.0	.5	.9	.1	3.7

=== College ===
Year	Team	GP	GS	MPG	FG%	3P%	FT%	RPG	APG	SPG	BPG	PPG
1989–90	Connecticut	**32**	20	25.8	.386	.313	.623	5.5	1.8	1.9	.9	8.2
1990–91	Connecticut	31	–	34.7	.440	.343	.592	**7.5**	**3.1**	**3.6**	**1.3**	12.7
1991–92	Connecticut	30	**30**	**35.3**	**.453**	**.396**	.611	6.1	2.9	2.5	1.0	**16.3**
1992–93	Connecticut	26	–	33.1	.411	.345	**.760**	6.0	2.1	2.4	1.1	16.1
Career		119	50+	32.1	.426	.357	.640	6.3	2.5	2.6	1.1	13.1
