= Bryon Russell =

American basketball player (b. 1970)

Personal information
- Born: December 31, 1970 (age 55) San Bernardino, California, U.S.
- Listed height: 6 ft 7 in (2.01 m)
- Listed weight: 225 lb (102 kg)

Career information
- High school: San Bernardino (San Bernardino, California)
- College: Long Beach State (1990–1993)
- NBA draft: 1993: 2nd round, 45th overall pick
- Drafted by: Utah Jazz
- Playing career: 1993–2010
- Position: Small forward / shooting guard
- Number: 34, 3, 2, 9

Career history
- 1993–2002: Utah Jazz
- 2002–2003: Washington Wizards
- 2003–2004: Los Angeles Lakers
- 2004–2006: Denver Nuggets
- 2006–2007: Hollywood Fame
- 2007–2008: Long Beach Breakers
- 2009–2010: Los Angeles Lightning

Career highlights
- IBL champion (2009); IBL All-Star (2009); Second-team All-Big West (1992); No. 32 retired by Long Beach State Beach

Career NBA statistics
- Points: 6,663 (7.9 ppg)
- Rebounds: 2,914 (3.5 rpg)
- Assists: 1,085 (1.3 apg)
- Stats at NBA.com
- Stats at Basketball Reference

Bryon Demetrise Russell (born December 31, 1970) is an American former professional basketball player. During a National Basketball Association (NBA) career that spanned 13 seasons, he played for the Denver Nuggets, Washington Wizards and Los Angeles Lakers and was a key member of the Utah Jazz, helping them reach back-to-back NBA finals appearances in 1997 and 1998. Russell also played for the Hollywood Fame and Long Beach Breakers of the American Basketball Association (ABA). He finished his career with the Los Angeles Lightning of the International Basketball League (IBA), winning a championship in 2009.

== NBA career ==
Russell began playing basketball at San Bernardino High School. After playing three years of college basketball with Long Beach State University, Russell was drafted forty-fifth overall in the 1993 NBA draft by the Utah Jazz. A renowned defender throughout his career, Russell often guarded the best player from opposing teams. From 1997 to 2000, he played in every regular-season game for the Jazz. He went to back-to-back NBA Finals with the Jazz in 1997 and 1998, but lost to the Chicago Bulls each time. Russell had arguably his best season with the Jazz in the 1999–2000 season, when he averaged 14.1 points and 5.2 rebounds per game. In 2001, Russell participated in the Three-Point Contest during all-star weekend. After playing nine seasons for the Jazz, Russell signed with the Washington Wizards as a free agent for the 2002–2003 season. Russell then signed with the Los Angeles Lakers as a free agent for the 2003–2004 season and made it to the 2004 NBA Finals but lost to the Detroit Pistons. He then signed with the Denver Nuggets as a free agent and played with them from 2004 to 2006. He was a part of the Seattle SuperSonics roster for a brief time in 2006 after being traded by the Nuggets but never appeared in a game for them.

Russell's alma mater, Long Beach State University, retired his jersey in 2010.

== Russell and Michael Jordan ==
Russell is best remembered for guarding Michael Jordan at the end of Game 6 of the 1998 NBA Finals. Jordan made the game-winning shot over Russell, although many fans believe Jordan pushed off Russell during the play. The referees did not call a foul on the play, and Russell later remarked, "Whether he pushed off or not, he was making that shot." He and Jordan were teammates when they played for the Washington Wizards during the 2002–03 NBA season, which was Jordan's last.

In 2009, Jordan mentioned Russell in his Hall of Fame induction speech, recalling an interaction they had during Jordan's first retirement in 1994: "[A]t this time, I had no thoughts of coming back and playing the game of basketball. Bryon Russell came over to me and said, 'Why did you quit? You know I could guard you.' ... From this day forward, if I ever see [Russell] in shorts, I'm coming at him." In response, Russell challenged Jordan to a game of one-on-one for charity. Such a match-up has not yet taken place, though the Utah Flash of the NBDL did stage a halftime game between Russell and a Jordan look-alike.

== Career statistics ==
=== NBA statistics ===
Legend
GP	Games played	GS	Games started	MPG	Minutes per game
FG%	Field goal percentage	3P%	3-point field goal percentage	FT%	Free throw percentage
RPG	Rebounds per game	APG	Assists per game	SPG	Steals per game
BPG	Blocks per game	PPG	Points per game	**Bold**	Career high
*	Led the league

=== Regular season ===
Year	Team	GP	GS	MPG	FG%	3P%	FT%	RPG	APG	SPG	BPG	PPG
1993–94	Utah	67	48	16.7	**.484**	.091	.614	2.7	.8	1.0	.3	5.0
1994–95	Utah	63	15	13.7	.437	.295	.667	2.2	.5	.8	.2	4.5
1995–96	Utah	59	9	9.8	.394	.350	.716	1.5	.5	.5	.1	2.9
1996–97	Utah	81	**81**	31.2	.479	.409	.701	4.1	1.5	**1.6**	.3	10.8
1997–98	Utah	**82***	7	27.1	.430	.341	.766	4.0	1.2	1.1	**.4**	9.0
1998–99	Utah	50*	50*	**35.4**	.464	.354	.795	**5.3**	1.5	1.5	.3	12.4
1999–2000	Utah	**82**	70	**35.4**	.446	.396	.750	5.2	1.9	**1.6**	.3	**14.1**
2000–01	Utah	78	46	31.7	.440	**.413**	.779	4.2	**2.1**	1.2	.3	12.0
2001–02	Utah	66	40	30.3	.380	.341	**.821**	4.5	**2.1**	1.0	.3	9.6
2002–03	Washington	70	23	19.8	.353	.329	.768	3.0	1.0	1.0	.1	4.5
2003–04	L.A. Lakers	72	1	13.1	.402	.384	.769	2.0	1.0	.4	.2	4.0
2004–05	Denver	70	2	14.7	.377	.376	.792	2.5	1.0	.6	.2	4.4
2005–06	Denver	1	0	3.0	...	...	...	1.0	1.0	.0	.0	.0
**Career**		841	392	23.5	.431	.369	.750	3.5	1.3	1.0	.2	7.9

=== Playoff statistics ===
Year	Team	GP	GS	MPG	FG%	3P%	FT%	RPG	APG	SPG	BPG	PPG
1994	Utah	6	0	6.0	.400	**.667**	**1.000**	1.5	.5	.0	.0	2.7
1995	Utah	2	0	6.5	**.571**	.500	.500	1.0	1.5	.5	.0	5.5
1996	Utah	18	0	25.5	.468	.472	.816	4.2	1.2	1.3	**.5**	9.6
1997	Utah	**20**	**20**	37.9	.461	.356	.721	4.6	1.4	1.1	.3	12.3
1998	Utah	**20**	13	34.9	.469	.365	.716	4.7	1.1	1.1	.3	11.0
1999	Utah	11	11	35.2	.426	.250	.722	6.1	1.2	1.8	.2	12.1
2000	Utah	10	10	37.1	.421	.289	.756	5.4	2.1	**1.6**	**.5**	14.0
2001	Utah	5	5	**42.8**	.446	.455	.917	**7.2**	**3.0**	.6	.2	**14.2**
2002	Utah	4	4	30.0	.250	.400	**1.000**	4.3	1.8	1.0	.0	7.0
2004	L.A. Lakers	6	0	2.7	.000	.000	...	.2	.3	.2	.0	.0
2005	Denver	3	0	3.0	.000	.000	**1.000**	.0	.0	.0	.0	1.0
**Career**		105	63	29.3	.440	.365	.759	4.2	1.3	1.0	.3	9.9
