= Bill Wennington =

Canadian basketball player (born 1963)

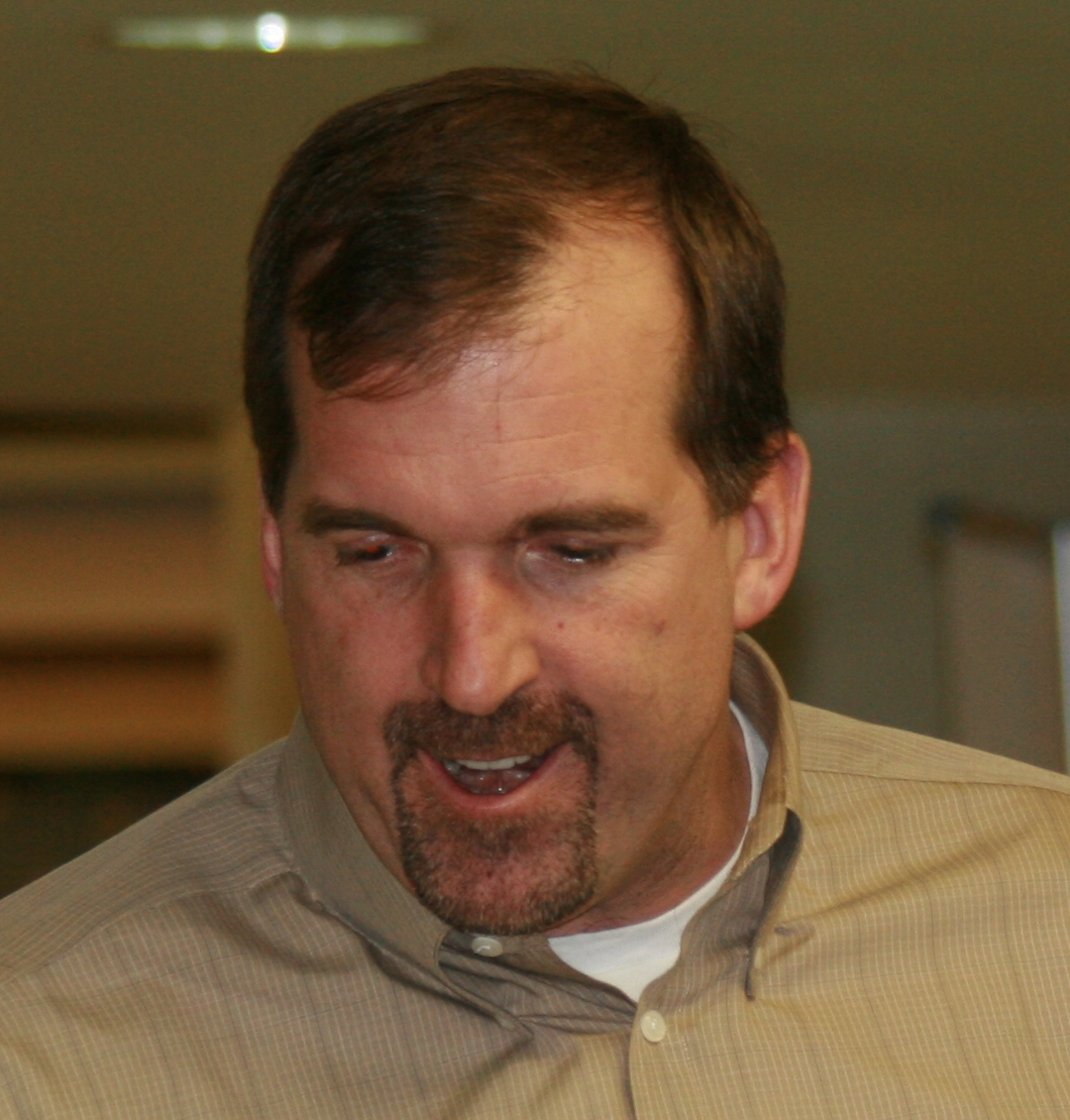

Personal information
- Born: April 26, 1963 (age 63) Montreal, Quebec, Canada
- Listed height: 7 ft 0 in (2.13 m)
- Listed weight: 245 lb (111 kg)

Career information
- High school: Long Island Lutheran (Brookville, New York)
- College: St. John's (1981–1985)
- NBA draft: 1985: 1st round, 16th overall pick
- Drafted by: Dallas Mavericks
- Playing career: 1985–2000
- Position: Center
- Number: 23, 34, 7

Career history
- 1985–1990: Dallas Mavericks
- 1990–1991: Sacramento Kings
- 1991–1993: Virtus Bologna
- 1993–1999: Chicago Bulls
- 1999–2000: Sacramento Kings

Career highlights
- 3× NBA champion (1996–1998); Italian League champion (1993); Second-team All-Big East (1985); Third-team All-Big East (1984); Fourth-team Parade All-American (1981); McDonald's All-American (1981)

Career NBA statistics
- Points: 3,301 (4.6 ppg)
- Rebounds: 2,148 (3.0 rpg)
- Assists: 440 (0.6 apg)
- Stats at NBA.com
- Stats at Basketball Reference

William Percey Wennington (born April 26, 1963) is a Canadian former professional basketball player who won three National Basketball Association (NBA) championships with the Chicago Bulls. A center, he represented Canada in the 1984 Olympics and the 1983 World University Games, where the team won gold. He was on the Canadian team which narrowly missed qualifying for the 1992 Olympics. Wennington has been inducted into the Quebec Basketball Hall of Fame and the Canadian Basketball Hall of Fame. In June 2026, Complex Canada named Wennington 17th in their ranking of The 20 Best Canadian Basketball Players of All Time.

== Amateur career ==
Born in Montreal, Wennington moved to Long Island as a child. He did not play basketball until moving to the United States and claimed he "didn't touch a basketball" until he was 11 years old. He attended Long Island Lutheran Middle and High School in Brookville, New York, where he played under coach Bob McKillop, and led the Crusaders to a No. 1 ranking in the northeast region and a top 10 ranking in the U.S. He was recruited to St. John's University in Queens, New York and he played on an NCAA Final Four team under coach Lou Carnesecca.

== Professional career ==
Wennington was drafted 16th in the first round of the 1985 NBA draft by the Dallas Mavericks. He made his NBA debut on October 29, 1985. On June 26, 1990, he was traded to the Sacramento Kings along with two 1990 first-round draft picks in exchange for Rodney McCray and two future second-round draft picks.

Before signing as a free agent with the Chicago Bulls in 1993, he spent a few years playing for Virtus (Knorr) in Bologna, Italy. In 1998, Chicago-area McDonald's restaurants sold a sandwich named after Wennington called the Beef Wennington. After the break-up of the Chicago Bulls dynasty of the 1990s, Wennington played his final NBA season with the Sacramento Kings.

== Post-basketball career ==
After his playing career ended, Wennington became a radio color commentator for the Bulls. He was inducted into the Canadian Basketball Hall of Fame in 2005. He was featured in the 2020 docuseries The Last Dance.

== Career statistics ==
Legend
GP	Games played	GS	Games started	MPG	Minutes per game
FG%	Field goal percentage	3P%	3-point field goal percentage	FT%	Free throw percentage
RPG	Rebounds per game	APG	Assists per game	SPG	Steals per game
BPG	Blocks per game	PPG	Points per game	**Bold**	Career high
†	Won an NBA championship

=== NBA ===
==== Regular season ====
Year	Team	GP	GS	MPG	FG%	3P%	FT%	RPG	APG	SPG	BPG	PPG
1985–86	Dallas	56	3	10.0	.471	.000	.726	2.4	.4	.3	.4	3.4
1986–87	Dallas	58	0	9.7	.424	.000	.750	2.2	.4	.2	.2	2.7
1987–88	Dallas	30	0	4.2	**.510**	.500	.632	1.3	.1	.2	.3	2.1
1988–89	Dallas	65	9	16.5	.433	.111	.744	4.4	.7	.2	.5	4.6
1989–90	Dallas	60	2	13.6	.449	.000	.800	3.3	.7	.3	.4	4.5
1990–91	Sacramento	**77**	**23**	**18.9**	.436	.200	.787	4.4	**.9**	**.6**	**.8**	5.7
1993–94	Chicago	76	0	18.0	.488	.000	.818	**4.6**	**.9**	**.6**	.4	**7.1**
1994–95	Chicago	73	1	13.1	.492	.000	.810	2.6	.5	.3	.2	5.0
1995–96†	Chicago	71	20	15.0	.493	**1.000**	.860	2.5	.6	.3	.2	5.3
1996–97†	Chicago	61	19	12.8	.498	.000	.830	2.1	.7	.2	.2	4.6
1997–98†	Chicago	48	8	9.7	.436	–	.810	1.7	.4	.1	.1	3.5
1998–99	Chicago	38	3	11.9	.348	**1.000**	.818	2.1	.5	.3	.3	3.8
1999–00	Sacramento	7	0	8.1	.316	–	**1.000**	2.7	.1	.3	.3	2.0
Career		720	88	13.5	.459	.139	.787	3.0	.6	.3	.3	4.6

==== Playoffs ====
Year	Team	GP	GS	MPG	FG%	3P%	FT%	RPG	APG	SPG	BPG	PPG
1986	Dallas	6	0	3.0	.333	**1.000**	**1.000**	.8	.0	.0	.0	1.2
1987	Dallas	4	0	11.8	.500	–	.600	2.5	**1.0**	.0	**.8**	3.8
1988	Dallas	6	0	2.3	.000	–	–	.7	.2	.2	.0	.0
1990	Dallas	3	0	8.3	.200	–	–	1.0	.3	.0	.3	.7
1994	Chicago	7	0	6.7	.500	–	.667	1.0	.6	.0	.1	1.1
1995	Chicago	10	0	**13.3**	.412	–	**1.000**	**2.8**	.3	.3	.3	**4.8**
1996†	Chicago	**18**	0	9.4	.520	.000	.500	1.7	.5	.2	.1	3.0
1998†	Chicago	16	0	7.4	**.526**	–	.500	.9	.2	**.4**	.1	2.8
Career		70	0	8.2	.459	.500	.679	1.4	.4	.2	.2	2.5

== See also ==
- List of Montreal athletes
- List of famous Montrealers
