= David Vaughn III =

American basketball player (born 1973)

David Vaughn
Personal information
- Born: March 23, 1973 (age 53) Tulsa, Oklahoma, U.S.
- Listed height: 6 ft 9 in (2.06 m)
- Listed weight: 240 lb (109 kg)

Career information
- High school: Whites Creek (Whites Creek, Tennessee)
- College: Memphis (1991–1995)
- NBA draft: 1995: 1st round, 25th overall pick
- Drafted by: Orlando Magic
- Playing career: 1995–2003
- Position: Power forward
- Number: 42, 34, 50

Career history
- 1995–1997: Orlando Magic
- 1997–1998: Golden State Warriors
- 1998: Chicago Bulls
- 1998–1999: New Jersey Nets
- 1998–1999: Near East
- 1999: New Jersey Nets
- 1999–2000: Cantabria Lobos
- 2000–2001: Near East
- 2001: Viola Reggio Calabria
- 2002–2003: G.S. Olympia Larissa

Career highlights
- First-team All-Great Midwest (1994); Second-team All-Great Midwest (1995); Great Midwest All-Newcomer team (1992); Third-team Parade All-American (1991); McDonald's All-American (1991)

Career NBA statistics
- Points: 341 (2.9 ppg)
- Rebounds: 361 (3.1 rpg)
- Stats at NBA.com
- Stats at Basketball Reference

David Vaughn III (born March 23, 1973) is an American retired professional basketball player.

Born in Tulsa, Oklahoma, Vaughn attended Whites Creek High School in Tennessee, and was a USA Today All-USA First-Team selection. He was later drafted out of the University of Memphis by the Orlando Magic in the first round (25th overall) of the 1995 NBA draft. A 6 ft 9 in (2.06 m) forward, Vaughn played four seasons in the National Basketball Association (NBA) from 1995 to 1999. He played for the Magic, Golden State Warriors, Chicago Bulls and New Jersey Nets.

In his NBA career, Vaughn played in 118 games and scored a total of 341 points.

After leaving the NBA, he played in Europe, then returned to Orlando. Having saved little money from his NBA playing days, he worked a number of blue-collar jobs, and for a time in 2008 was living out of his car. In 2009, his friends held a fundraiser for him. "I bought houses that were too big and too many luxurious cars. I wish I'd have lived more simply because I'd be better off. [...] I appreciate people stepping forward. It'll help me put some of my life back together," he said in an interview.

As of September 2009, Vaughn was supporting his wife and their two children in southwest Orlando, Florida.
