= Jud Buechler =

American basketball player and coach (born 1968)

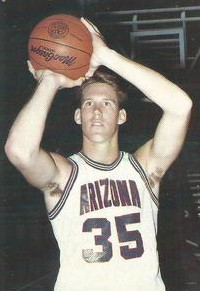
- Buechler, circa 1987

Personal information
- Born: June 19, 1968 (age 58) San Diego, California, U.S.
- Listed height: 6 ft 6 in (1.98 m)
- Listed weight: 228 lb (103 kg)

Career information
- High school: Poway (Poway, California)
- College: Arizona (1986–1990)
- NBA draft: 1990: 2nd round, 38th overall pick
- Drafted by: Seattle SuperSonics
- Playing career: 1990–2002
- Position: Small forward / shooting guard
- Number: 35, 33, 30, 26

Career history

Playing
- 1990–1991: New Jersey Nets
- 1991: San Antonio Spurs
- 1991–1994: Golden State Warriors
- 1994–1998: Chicago Bulls
- 1999–2001: Detroit Pistons
- 2001: Phoenix Suns
- 2001–2002: Orlando Magic

Coaching
- 2016–2018: Los Angeles Lakers (assistant)
- 2018–2020: New York Knicks (assistant)

Career highlights
- 3× NBA champion (1996–1998); First-team All-Pac-10 (1990)

Career NBA statistics
- Points: 2,385 (3.3 ppg)
- Assists: 560 (0.8 apg)
- Rebound: 1,266 (1.8 rpg)
- Stats at NBA.com
- Stats at Basketball Reference

Judson Donald Buechler (born June 19, 1968) is an American professional basketball coach and former player who played 12 seasons in the National Basketball Association (NBA). Playing for seven teams during his career, he was part of the Chicago Bulls during their three consecutive championship seasons between 1996 and 1998.

== Early life and college career ==
Buechler grew up in Poway, California, and attended Poway High School, where he was a top basketball recruit as well as a Top-50 men's volleyball prospect. He was a basketball player for all four seasons, and an All-American volleyball player at the University of Arizona, where he earned the nickname "The Judge". As a basketball player, his career averages with Arizona were 8.7 points, 4.9 rebounds, and 1.9 assists over 22.4 minutes per game across 131 games.

== NBA career ==
A sharp-shooting 6 ft 6 in guard/forward, Buechler was selected by the Seattle SuperSonics in the 2nd round, 38th overall, of the 1990 NBA draft. His draft rights were immediately traded to the New Jersey Nets, and he spent slightly over one season with the Nets before being waived in 1991.

After a brief stint with the San Antonio Spurs, he signed with the Golden State Warriors, with whom he averaged 6.2 points, 1.3 assists, and 2.8 rebounds (all career-highs) during the 1992–93 NBA season. However, Buechler would become best known for his four-year tenure (1994–1998) with the Chicago Bulls. With his former college teammate Steve Kerr, Buechler provided clutch shooting off the bench during the Bulls' second three-peat (1996–1998).

As the Bulls began their post-Jordan rebuilding process in 1999, Buechler signed with the Detroit Pistons, where he played for three seasons before being traded to the Phoenix Suns.

Buechler ended his career in 2002 after a short stint with the Orlando Magic. Buechler played 720 games across 12 seasons, with seven different franchises.

== NBA career statistics ==
Legend
GP	Games played	GS	Games started	MPG	Minutes per game
FG%	Field goal percentage	3P%	3-point field goal percentage	FT%	Free throw percentage
RPG	Rebounds per game	APG	Assists per game	SPG	Steals per game
BPG	Blocks per game	PPG	Points per game	**Bold**	Career high
†	Won an NBA championship	*	Led the league

=== Regular season ===
Year	Team	GP	GS	MPG	FG%	3P%	FT%	RPG	APG	SPG	BPG	PPG
1990–91	New Jersey	74	**10**	11.6	.416	.250	.652	1.9	.7	.4	.2	3.1
1991–92	New Jersey	2	0	14.5	**.500**	–	–	1.0	1.0	**1.0**	**.5**	4.0
1991–92	San Antonio	11	0	12.7	**.500**	–	.333	2.0	1.0	.7	.3	3.0
1991–92	Golden State	15	0	8.1	.303	.000	**.750**	1.9	.7	.6	.2	1.9
1992–93	Golden State	70	9	18.4	.437	.339	.747	**2.8**	**1.3**	.7	.3	**6.2**
1993–94	Golden State	36	0	6.1	**.500**	.414	.500	.9	.4	.2	.0	2.9
1994–95	Chicago	57	0	10.6	.492	.313	.564	1.7	.9	.4	.2	3.8
1995–96†	Chicago	74	0	10.0	.463	**.444**	.636	1.5	.8	.5	.1	3.8
1996–97†	Chicago	**76**	0	9.3	.367	.333	.357	1.7	.8	.3	.3	1.8
1997–98†	Chicago	74	0	8.2	.483	.385	.500	1.0	.7	.3	.2	2.7
1998–99	Detroit	50*	0	**21.1**	.417	.412	.722	2.7	1.1	.7	.3	5.5
1999–00	Detroit	58	5	11.3	.353	.217	.286	1.6	.6	.4	.3	2.2
2000–01	Detroit	57	3	12.9	.463	.416	**.750**	1.6	.7	.4	.2	3.4
2001–02	Phoenix	6	0	9.0	.333	.333	–	1.3	.5	.2	.0	1.0
2001–02	Orlando	60	2	10.5	.375	.352	.500	1.8	.5	.3	.1	1.8
Career		720	29	11.7	.433	.366	.633	1.8	.8	.4	.2	3.3

=== Playoffs ===
Year	Team	GP	GS	MPG	FG%	3P%	FT%	RPG	APG	SPG	BPG	PPG
1995	Chicago	10	0	10.4	.429	.000	.500	2.0	.5	.4	**.3**	2.0
1996†	Chicago	17	0	7.5	**.474**	.381	.500	.6	.4	.4	.0	**2.7**
1997†	Chicago	**18**	0	7.7	.419	.333	**.600**	1.3	.3	.2	.1	1.8
1998†	Chicago	16	0	4.0	.364	**.600**	–	.7	.2	.2	.1	.7
1999	Detroit	5	0	**16.8**	.200	.250	–	**2.6**	**.6**	**.6**	.2	1.6
2000	Detroit	3	0	11.3	.286	.400	–	1.3	.3	.0	**.3**	2.0
2002	Orlando	2	0	5.0	–	–	–	.5	.5	.5	.0	.0
Career		71	0	7.9	.398	.358	.538	1.2	.3	.3	.1	1.7
