= Randy Brown (basketball) =

American basketball player and coach

Personal information
- Born: May 22, 1968 (age 58) Chicago, Illinois, U.S.
- Listed height: 6 ft 2 in (1.88 m)
- Listed weight: 190 lb (86 kg)

Career information
- High school: Collins (Chicago, Illinois)
- College: Houston (1986–1988); New Mexico State (1989–1991)
- NBA draft: 1991: 2nd round, 31st overall pick
- Drafted by: Sacramento Kings
- Playing career: 1991–2003
- Position: Point guard
- Number: 3, 0, 1, 11
- Coaching career: 2015–2018

Career history

Playing
- 1991–1995: Sacramento Kings
- 1995–2000: Chicago Bulls
- 2000–2002: Boston Celtics
- 2002–2003: Phoenix Suns

Coaching
- 2008–2009: Sacramento Kings (assistant)
- 2015–2018: Chicago Bulls (assistant)

Career highlights
- 3× NBA champion (1996–1998); 2× First-team All-Big West (1990, 1991)

Career statistics
- Points: 3,148 (4.8 ppg)
- Assists: 1,420 (2.2 apg)
- Steals: 722 (1.1 spg)
- Stats at NBA.com
- Stats at Basketball Reference

Randy Brown (born May 22, 1968) is an American retired basketball player and former coach for the Chicago Bulls of the National Basketball Association (NBA). Brown was a guard who played at New Mexico State University and the University of Houston. He also popularized the "What time is it" chant as a pre-game ritual, which was innovated by Cliff Levingston.

== Professional career ==
Brown was selected by the Sacramento Kings in the second round of the 1991 NBA draft. He played four seasons in Sacramento, scoring 1,349 points, but he would become best known for his tenure with the Chicago Bulls.

Brown signed with the Bulls in 1995, and he provided valuable energy and aggressiveness off the bench during the Bulls' second "three-peat" (1996–1998). A fan favorite, Brown was also one of the few veteran players who stayed with the Bulls after the 1998–99 lockout. With the departure of Michael Jordan, Scottie Pippen, and Dennis Rodman, he became a full-time starter and averaged 8.8 points, 3.8 assists, and 3.4 rebounds (all career-highs) during the remainder of the 1998–99 season. After two more seasons in Chicago, Brown played briefly for the Boston Celtics and the Phoenix Suns, and he retired from the NBA in 2003 with 3,148 career points and 1,420 career assists.

== Coaching career ==
In July 2009, Brown was hired by the Bulls as their director of player development. The next year, he was named special assistant to the general manager. In 2013, he was promoted to assistant general manager. In 2017, it was widely reported that rifts between players and the front office were in large part due to a mole reporting on player activities within the locker room to management. The identity of the mole has been speculated to be Randy Brown.

== Career statistics ==
Legend
GP	Games played	GS	Games started	MPG	Minutes per game
FG%	Field goal percentage	3P%	3-point field goal percentage	FT%	Free throw percentage
RPG	Rebounds per game	APG	Assists per game	SPG	Steals per game
BPG	Blocks per game	PPG	Points per game	**Bold**	Career high
†	Won an NBA championship

=== NBA ===
==== Regular season ====
Year	Team	GP	GS	MPG	FG%	3P%	FT%	RPG	APG	SPG	BPG	PPG
1991–92	Sacramento	56	0	9.6	.456	.000	.655	1.2	1.1	.6	.2	3.4
1992–93	Sacramento	**75**	34	23.0	**.463**	.333	.732	2.8	2.6	1.4	.5	7.6
1993–94	Sacramento	61	2	17.1	.438	.000	.609	1.8	2.2	1.0	.2	4.5
1994–95	Sacramento	67	2	16.2	.432	.298	.671	1.6	2.0	1.5	.3	4.7
1995–96†	Chicago	68	0	9.9	.406	.091	.609	1.0	1.1	.8	.2	2.7
1996–97†	Chicago	72	3	14.7	.420	.182	.679	1.5	1.8	1.1	.2	4.7
1997–98†	Chicago	71	6	16.2	.384	.000	.718	1.3	2.1	1.0	.2	4.1
1998–99	Chicago	39	32	**29.2**	.414	.000	**.757**	**3.4**	**3.8**	**1.7**	.2	**8.8**
1999–00	Chicago	59	**55**	27.5	.361	**.500**	.738	2.4	3.4	1.0	.3	6.4
2000–01	Boston	54	35	22.9	.422	.000	.575	1.8	2.9	1.1	.2	4.1
2001–02	Boston	1	0	6.0	.000	–	–	.0	2.0	.0	**1.0**	.0
2002–03	Phoenix	32	0	8.2	.372	–	.750	.8	1.1	.5	.1	1.3
Career		655	169	17.6	.417	.200	.691	1.8	2.2	1.1	.2	4.8

==== Playoffs ====
Year	Team	GP	GS	MPG	FG%	3P%	FT%	RPG	APG	SPG	BPG	PPG
1996†	Chicago	16	0	**7.0**	**.571**	**.500**	.750	**.6**	.4	.3	**.1**	**2.8**
1997†	Chicago	**17**	0	5.8	.300	–	.600	**.6**	.4	**.5**	**.1**	1.2
1998†	Chicago	14	0	5.1	.167	–	**.833**	**.6**	**.6**	.1	.0	.6
Career		47	0	6.0	.386	.500	.739	.6	.5	.3	.1	1.6

== Personal life ==
He is married with three children.
