= 1997–98 Orlando Magic season =

NBA professional basketball team season

- Head coach: Chuck Daly
- President: Bob Vander Weide
- General manager: John Gabriel
- Owner: Richard DeVos
- Arena: Orlando Arena

Results
- Record: 41–41 (.500)
- Place: Division: 5th (Atlantic); Conference: 10th (Eastern)
- Playoff finish: Did not qualify
- Stats at Basketball Reference

Local media
- Television: Sunshine Network, WKCF

The 1997–98 Orlando Magic season was the ninth season for the Orlando Magic in the National Basketball Association.

== Season summary ==
=== Off-season ===
During the off-season, the Magic hired Chuck Daly as their new head coach; Daly led the Detroit Pistons to two consecutive NBA championships between 1989 and 1990. The team also acquired former All-Star guard Mark Price from the Golden State Warriors, acquired Derek Harper and Ed O'Bannon from the Dallas Mavericks, and signed free agent Bo Outlaw. However, O'Bannon was released to free agency shortly before the regular season began.

=== Regular season ===
Under Daly and with the addition of Price, Harper and Outlaw, the Magic got off to a solid 16–7 start to the regular season, which included a six-game winning streak in November. However, the team struggled losing nine of their next ten games, as Penny Hardaway only played just 19 games due to a left knee injury. The team posted a seven-game losing streak in January, as Darrell Armstrong was out for the remainder of the season after 48 games, due to a torn rotator cuff in his right shoulder. The Magic signed free agent Vernon Maxwell in January, but released him to free agency after eleven games, as he later on signed with the Charlotte Hornets. The Magic fell below .500 in winning percentage, and held a 23–25 record at the All-Star break.

At mid-season, the team traded Rony Seikaly to the Utah Jazz in exchange for Greg Foster and Chris Morris; however, the trade was voided due to Seikaly failing to report to the Jazz within the 48-hour deadline, because of a foot injury. Instead, he was then traded along with second-year forward Brian Evans to the New Jersey Nets in exchange for David Benoit, Kevin Edwards and Yinka Dare; Dare never played for the Magic and was soon released to free agency. Before the trade, Seikaly averaged 15.0 points and 7.6 rebounds per game in 47 games. After the trade, the Magic signed free agent and former Slam Dunk champion Spud Webb to a 10-day contract, as he appeared in four games for the team before being waived. The Magic played above .500 for the remainder of the season, and finished in fifth place in the Atlantic Division with a 41–41 record; the team failed to qualify for the NBA playoffs for the first time since the 1992–93 season.

Hardaway averaged 16.4 points, 3.6 assists and 1.5 steals per game, but struggled shooting .377 in field-goal percentage. In Hardaway's absence, Nick Anderson stepped up averaging 15.3 points and 5.1 rebounds per game in 58 games, while Derek Strong played a sixth man role off the bench, averaging 12.7 points and 7.4 rebounds per game also in 58 games, and Horace Grant provided the team with 12.1 points and 8.1 rebounds per game. In addition, Outlaw had a stellar season averaging 9.5 points, 7.8 rebounds, 1.3 steals and 2.2 blocks per game, and shooting .554 in field-goal percentage, while Price contributed 9.5 points and 4.7 assists per game, Armstrong provided with 9.2 points and 4.9 assists per game, and Harper contributed 8.6 points and 3.5 assists per game. Meanwhile, Danny Schayes became the team's starting center after Seikaly was traded, averaging 5.5 points and 3.3 rebounds per game, Benoit contributed 5.8 points per game in 24 games after the trade, and Wilkins contributed 5.3 points per game, but struggled as he shot just .325 in field-goal percentage.

During the NBA All-Star weekend at Madison Square Garden in New York City, New York, Hardaway was selected for the 1998 NBA All-Star Game, as a member of the Eastern Conference All-Star team; it was his fourth and final All-Star appearance. Hardaway was voted by the fans as the starting point guard for the Eastern Conference despite his knee injury, which drew controversy. Anderson finished tied in fourth place in Most Improved Player voting, while Outlaw finished tied in eighth place; Outlaw also finished tied in fifth place in Defensive Player of the Year voting, while Grant finished tied in eleventh place, and Daly finished tied in ninth place in Coach of the Year voting.

The Magic finished 18th in the NBA in home-game attendance, with an attendance of 667,322 at the Orlando Arena during the regular season.

=== Aftermath ===
Following the season, Price retired after twelve seasons in the NBA, while Harper signed as a free agent with the Los Angeles Lakers, and Benoit and Edwards were both released to free agency.

== Draft picks ==
Round	Pick	Player	Position	Nationality	School/Club team
1	17	Johnny Taylor	SF	United States	Chattanooga
2	47	Eric Washington	SG	United States	Alabama

== Roster ==
1997–98 Orlando Magic roster
Players

Pos.	No.	Player	Height	Weight	DOB	From
G/F	25	Nick Anderson	6 ft 6 in (1.98 m)	205 lb (93 kg)	1968–01–20	Illinois
G	10	Darrell Armstrong	6 ft 0 in (1.83 m)	170 lb (77 kg)	1968–06–22	Fayetteville State
F	2	David Benoit	6 ft 8 in (2.03 m)	220 lb (100 kg)	1968–05–09	Alabama
G	20	Kevin Edwards	6 ft 3 in (1.91 m)	190 lb (86 kg)	1965–10–30	DePaul
F/C	54	Horace Grant	6 ft 10 in (2.08 m)	215 lb (98 kg)	1965–07–04	Clemson
G	1	Penny Hardaway	6 ft 7 in (2.01 m)	195 lb (88 kg)	1971–07–18	Memphis
G	12	Derek Harper	6 ft 4 in (1.93 m)	185 lb (84 kg)	1961–10–13	Illinois
C	8	Jason Lawson	6 ft 11 in (2.11 m)	240 lb (109 kg)	1974–09–02	Villanova
G	3	Kevin Ollie	6 ft 4 in (1.93 m)	195 lb (88 kg)	1972–12–27	Connecticut
F	45	Bo Outlaw	6 ft 8 in (2.03 m)	210 lb (95 kg)	1971–04–13	Houston
G	5	Mark Price	6 ft 0 in (1.83 m)	170 lb (77 kg)	1964–02–15	Georgia Tech
C	24	Danny Schayes	6 ft 11 in (2.11 m)	235 lb (107 kg)	1959–05–10	Syracuse
F	33	Derek Strong	6 ft 8 in (2.03 m)	220 lb (100 kg)	1968–02–09	Xavier
F	17	Johnny Taylor	6 ft 9 in (2.06 m)	220 lb (100 kg)	1974–06–04	Chattanooga
G	21	Gerald Wilkins	6 ft 6 in (1.98 m)	185 lb (84 kg)	1963–09–11	Chattanooga

Coaches
Head coach
- Chuck Daly
Assistant(s)
- Tree Rollins
- Tom Sterner
- Brendan Suhr

Legend
- (DP) Unsigned draft pick
- (FA) Free agent
- (S) Suspended
- Injured

Roster
Updated: March 22, 1998

== Regular season ==
=== Season standings ===
Atlantic Division	W	L	PCT	GB	Home	Road	Div
y-Miami Heat	55	27	.671	–	30-11	25–16	18–6
x-New York Knicks	43	39	.524	12	28–13	15–26	13–11
x-New Jersey Nets	43	39	.524	12	26–15	17–24	12–12
Washington Wizards	42	40	.512	13	24–17	18–23	12–13
Orlando Magic	41	41	.500	14	24–17	17–24	11–13
Boston Celtics	36	46	.439	19	24–17	12–29	12–12
Philadelphia 76ers	31	51	.378	24	19–22	12–29	7–17

#	Eastern Conference				
#	Team	W	L	PCT	GB
1	c-Chicago Bulls	62	20	.756	–
2	y-Miami Heat	55	27	.671	7
3	x-Indiana Pacers	58	24	.707	4
4	x-Charlotte Hornets	51	31	.622	11
5	x-Atlanta Hawks	50	32	.610	12
6	x-Cleveland Cavaliers	47	35	.573	15
7	x-New York Knicks	43	39	.524	19
8	x-New Jersey Nets	43	39	.524	19
9	Washington Wizards	42	40	.512	20
10	Orlando Magic	41	41	.500	21
11	Detroit Pistons	37	45	.451	25
12	Boston Celtics	36	46	.439	26
13	Milwaukee Bucks	36	46	.439	26
14	Philadelphia 76ers	31	51	.378	31
15	Toronto Raptors	16	66	.195	46

z – clinched division title
y – clinched division title
x – clinched playoff spot

== Player statistics ==
=== Regular season ===
Player	POS	GP	GS	MP	REB	AST	STL	BLK	PTS	MPG	RPG	APG	SPG	BPG	PPG
Bo Outlaw	PF	82	76	2,953	637	216	107	181	783	36.0	7.8	2.6	1.3	2.2	9.5
Horace Grant	C	76	76	2,803	618	172	81	79	921	36.9	8.1	2.3	1.1	1.0	12.1
Danny Schayes	C	74	33	1,272	242	44	34	33	406	17.2	3.3	.6	.5	.4	5.5
Gerald Wilkins	SG	72	16	1,252	90	78	34	6	380	17.4	1.3	1.1	.5	.1	5.3
Derek Harper	SG	66	45	1,761	103	233	72	10	566	26.7	1.6	3.5	1.1	.2	8.6
Mark Price	PG	63	33	1,430	129	297	53	5	597	22.7	2.0	4.7	.8	.1	9.5
Nick Anderson	SF	58	44	1,701	297	119	72	23	890	29.3	5.1	2.1	1.2	.4	15.3
Derek Strong	PF	58	8	1,638	427	51	31	24	736	28.2	7.4	.9	.5	.4	12.7
Darrell Armstrong	PG	48	17	1,236	159	236	58	5	442	25.8	3.3	4.9	1.2	.1	9.2
Rony Seikaly^{†}	C	47	47	1,484	357	69	25	39	704	31.6	7.6	1.5	.5	.8	15.0
Brian Evans^{†}	SF	44	0	561	85	31	22	8	206	12.8	1.9	.7	.5	.2	4.7
David Benoit^{†}	SF	24	0	324	62	8	9	4	138	13.5	2.6	.3	.4	.2	5.8
Penny Hardaway	SG	19	15	625	76	68	28	15	311	32.9	4.0	3.6	1.5	.8	16.4
Kevin Ollie^{†}	PG	19	0	216	18	33	7	0	77	11.4	.9	1.7	.4	.0	4.1
Jason Lawson	C	17	0	80	27	5	4	4	26	4.7	1.6	.3	.2	.2	1.5
Kevin Edwards^{†}	SG	12	0	135	20	13	5	1	59	11.3	1.7	1.1	.4	.1	4.9
Johnny Taylor	SF	12	0	108	13	1	3	2	38	9.0	1.1	.1	.3	.2	3.2
Vernon Maxwell^{†}	SG	11	0	169	13	12	2	1	81	15.4	1.2	1.1	.2	.1	7.4
Spud Webb	PG	4	0	34	3	5	1	0	12	8.5	.8	1.3	.3	.0	3.0
Carl Thomas^{†}	SG	4	0	15	0	1	0	1	9	3.8	.0	.3	.0	.3	2.3
Tim Kempton^{†}	PF	3	0	15	1	1	0	0	0	5.0	.3	.3	.0	.0	.0
Donald Royal^{†}	SF	2	0	18	4	1	1	0	5	9.0	2.0	.5	.5	.0	2.5

- ^{†} Denotes player spent time with another team in the season. Stats reflect time with the Magic only.

== Awards and honors ==
- Penny Hardaway – All-Star
