= 1996–97 New Jersey Nets season =

NBA professional basketball team season

- Head coach: John Calipari
- Arena: Continental Airlines Arena

Results
- Record: 26–56 (.317)
- Place: Division: 5th (Atlantic); Conference: 13th (Eastern)
- Playoff finish: Did not qualify
- Stats at Basketball Reference

Local media
- Television: WBIS-TV; SportsChannel New York
- Radio: WOR

The 1996–97 New Jersey Nets season was the Nets' 30th season in the National Basketball Association, and 21st season in East Rutherford, New Jersey.

== Season summary ==
=== Off-season ===
The Nets received the eighth overall pick in the 1996 NBA draft, and selected shooting guard Kerry Kittles out of Villanova University. During the off-season, the team signed free agents Robert Pack, Tony Massenburg, David Benoit, and Xavier McDaniel, who played overseas in Greece during the previous season, and acquired Vincent Askew from the Seattle SuperSonics. The Nets also hired John Calipari as their new head coach. However, Benoit would miss the entire regular season due to a ruptured Achilles tendon, while after only just one game with the Nets, Askew was traded to the Indiana Pacers in exchange for Reggie Williams.

=== Regular season ===
Early into the regular season, the Nets traveled overseas to Tokyo, Japan to play two games against the Orlando Magic at the Tokyo Dome. In the first game on November 7, 1996, the Nets were the home team and lost to the Magic by a score of 108–95; Kendall Gill led the team with 22 points and 7 assists, while Shawn Bradley finished with a double-double of 18 points and 11 rebounds, and Jayson Williams also had a double-double, contributing 13 points and 16 rebounds. In the second game on November 8, the Nets were the road team and lost to the Magic by a score of 86–82; Pack led the team with 13 points, while Jayson Williams finished with a double-double of 12 points and 18 rebounds. Both games had an attendance of 38,639 fans at the Tokyo Dome.

Under Calipari and with the addition of Kittles, Pack, Massenburg and McDaniel, the Nets continued to struggle losing their first five games of the regular season. The team got off to a 5–16 start to the season, lost 11 of their 15 games in January, and later on held a 13–33 record at the All-Star break. At mid-season, the Nets traded Pack, Bradley, Khalid Reeves and second-year forward Ed O'Bannon to the Dallas Mavericks in exchange for Sam Cassell, Jim Jackson, Chris Gatling, Eric Montross and George McCloud; McCloud never played for the Nets, and was soon traded to the Los Angeles Lakers in exchange for Joe Kleine. Gatling only played just three games after the trade due to an ear infection, and was out for the remainder of the season, averaging 17.0 points, 7.3 rebounds and 1.3 steals per game during his short three-game stint. The Nets lost nine of their final twelve games of the season, and finished in fifth place in the Atlantic Division with a 26–56 record.

Gill averaged 21.8 points, 6.1 rebounds, 4.0 assists and 1.9 steals per game, while Cassell averaged 19.3 points, 6.5 assists and 1.6 steals per game in 23 games after the trade, and Jackson provided the team with 16.5 points, 5.9 rebounds and 5.2 assists per game in 31 games. In addition, Kittles contributed 16.4 points and 1.9 steals per game, led the Nets with 158 three-point field goals, and was named to the NBA All-Rookie Second Team, while Jayson Williams continued to show improvement, becoming the team's starting power forward averaging 13.4 points and 13.5 rebounds per game, but only played just 41 games due to a season-ending thumb injury, and Massenburg provided with 7.2 points and 6.5 rebounds per game. Meanwhile, Reggie Williams averaged 6.5 points per game in eleven games, Kevin Edwards contributed 5.9 points per game in only just 32 games, McDaniel provided with 5.6 points and 5.1 rebounds per game, and Montross averaged 5.1 points, 9.1 rebounds and 1.3 blocks per game in 31 games.

During the NBA All-Star weekend at the Gund Arena in Cleveland, Ohio, Kittles was selected for the NBA Rookie Game, as a member of the Eastern Conference Rookie team. Gill finished tied in fifth place in Most Improved Player voting, while Kittles finished in fifth place in Rookie of the Year voting, and Gatling finished in third place in Sixth Man of the Year voting. The Nets finished 18th in the NBA in home-game attendance, with an attendance of 670,628 at the Continental Airlines Arena during the regular season.

=== Aftermath ===
Following the season, Jackson and Montross were both traded to the Philadelphia 76ers, while Massenburg signed as a free agent with the Boston Celtics, who later on traded him to the Vancouver Grizzlies, and Kleine signed with the Chicago Bulls.

== Draft picks ==
Round	Pick	Player	Position	Nationality	College
1	8	Kerry Kittles	SG	United States	Villanova

== Roster ==
1996–97 New Jersey Nets roster
Players

Pos.	No.	Player	Height	Weight	DOB	From
F	2	David Benoit (injured) (IN)	6 ft 8 in (2.03 m)	220 lb (100 kg)	1968-05-09	Alabama
G	10	Sam Cassell (injured)	6 ft 3 in (1.91 m)	185 lb (84 kg)	1969-11-18	Florida State
C	33	Yinka Dare	7 ft 0 in (2.13 m)	265 lb (120 kg)	1972-10-10	George Washington
G	21	Kevin Edwards	6 ft 3 in (1.91 m)	190 lb (86 kg)	1965-10-30	DePaul
F	15	Chris Gatling (injured)	6 ft 10 in (2.08 m)	220 lb (100 kg)	1967-09-03	Old Dominion
G/F	13	Kendall Gill	6 ft 5 in (1.96 m)	195 lb (88 kg)	1968-05-25	Illinois
F	54	Jack Haley	6 ft 10 in (2.08 m)	240 lb (109 kg)	1964-01-27	UCLA
F	22	Jim Jackson	6 ft 6 in (1.98 m)	220 lb (100 kg)	1970-10-14	Ohio State
G	30	Kerry Kittles	6 ft 5 in (1.96 m)	179 lb (81 kg)	1974-06-12	Villanova
C	35	Joe Kleine	6 ft 11 in (2.11 m)	255 lb (116 kg)	1962-01-04	Arkansas
F	44	Tony Massenburg	6 ft 9 in (2.06 m)	220 lb (100 kg)	1967-07-31	Maryland
F	34	Xavier McDaniel	6 ft 7 in (2.01 m)	205 lb (93 kg)	1963-06-04	Wichita State
C	00	Eric Montross	7 ft 0 in (2.13 m)	270 lb (122 kg)	1971-09-23	North Carolina
F	55	Jayson Williams (injured)	6 ft 9 in (2.06 m)	240 lb (109 kg)	1968-02-22	St. John's
F	7	Reggie Williams (injured)	6 ft 7 in (2.01 m)	190 lb (86 kg)	1964-03-05	Georgetown

Coaches
Head coach
- John Calipari
Assistant(s)
- Don Casey
- Kenny Gattison
- Ed Schilling

Legend
- (DP) Unsigned draft pick
- (FA) Free agent
- (S) Suspended
- (IN) Inactive
- Injured

Roster

Roster notes

- Small forward David Benoit was on the injured reserve list due to a ruptured Achilles tendon, and missed the entire regular season.

== Regular season ==
=== Season standings ===
Atlantic Division	W	L	PCT	GB	Home	Road	Div
y-Miami Heat	61	21	.744	–	29–12	32–9	16–8
x-New York Knicks	57	25	.695	4	31–10	26–15	19–6
x-Orlando Magic	45	37	.549	16	26–15	19–22	13–11
x-Washington Bullets	44	38	.537	17	25–16	19–22	14–10
New Jersey Nets	26	56	.317	35	16–25	10–31	11–13
Philadelphia 76ers	22	60	.268	39	11–30	11–30	11–14
Boston Celtics	15	67	.183	46	11–30	4–37	1–23

1996–97 NBA East standings
#	Eastern Conference				
#	Team	W	L	PCT	GB
1	z-Chicago Bulls	69	13	.841	–
2	y-Miami Heat	61	21	.744	8
3	x-New York Knicks	57	25	.695	12
4	x-Atlanta Hawks	56	26	.683	13
5	x-Detroit Pistons	54	28	.659	15
6	x-Charlotte Hornets	54	28	.659	15
7	x-Orlando Magic	45	37	.549	24
8	x-Washington Bullets	44	38	.537	25
9	Cleveland Cavaliers	42	40	.512	27
10	Indiana Pacers	39	43	.476	30
11	Milwaukee Bucks	33	49	.402	36
12	Toronto Raptors	30	52	.366	39
13	New Jersey Nets	26	56	.317	43
14	Philadelphia 76ers	22	60	.268	47
15	Boston Celtics	15	67	.183	54

z – clinched division title
y – clinched division title
x – clinched playoff spot

== Player statistics ==
Legend
GP	Games played	GS	Games started	MPG	Minutes per game
FG%	Field-goal percentage	3P%	3-point field-goal percentage	FT%	Free-throw percentage
RPG	Rebounds per game	APG	Assists per game	SPG	Steals per game
BPG	Blocks per game	PPG	Points per game

=== Regular season ===
Player	GP	GS	MPG	FG%	3P%	FT%	RPG	APG	SPG	BPG	PPG
Kendall Gill	82	81	39.0	.443	.336	.797	6.1	4.0	1.9	0.6	21.8
Sam Cassell	23	22	33.8	.443	.392	.831	3.6	6.5	1.6	0.3	19.3
Chris Gatling	3	0	30.7	.419		.938	7.3	1.0	1.3	0.0	17.0
Jim Jackson	31	31	37.3	.417	.370	.852	5.9	5.2	0.9	0.5	16.5
Kerry Kittles	82	57	36.7	.426	.377	.771	3.9	3.0	1.9	0.4	16.4
Robert Pack	34	31	34.9	.407	.297	.788	2.5	9.6	1.7	0.1	15.9
Jayson Williams	41	40	34.9	.409	.000	.590	13.5	1.2	0.6	0.9	13.4
Shawn Bradley	40	38	30.7	.436	.000	.664	8.1	0.5	0.6	4.0	12.0
Khalid Reeves	50	18	21.0	.393	.396	.747	1.8	3.4	0.5	0.1	8.3
Tony Massenburg	79	49	24.7	.485	.000	.631	6.5	0.3	0.5	0.6	7.2
Reggie Williams	11	0	15.2	.403	.273	.800	2.2	0.7	0.7	0.4	6.5
Kevin Edwards	32	0	14.9	.377	.349	.860	1.3	1.8	0.5	0.1	5.9
Xavier McDaniel	62	5	18.9	.389	.200	.730	5.1	1.0	0.6	0.3	5.6
Lloyd Daniels	17	0	16.6	.330	.322	.833	2.3	1.5	0.5	0.2	5.4
Eric Montross	31	31	27.2	.451		.393	9.1	0.9	0.4	1.3	5.1
Ed O'Bannon	45	5	14.1	.367	.283	.870	2.5	0.6	0.5	0.2	4.2
Joe Kleine	28	0	16.2	.427	.500	.722	4.1	0.8	0.3	0.4	3.0
Evric Gray	5	0	8.4	.267	.250	1.000	0.6	0.4	0.2	0.0	2.6
Jack Haley	20	0	3.7	.351		.737	1.6	0.3	0.1	0.1	2.0
Adrian Caldwell	18	0	11.3	.286	.000	.529	3.1	0.3	0.4	0.1	1.6
Robert Werdann	6	0	5.2	.429		1.000	1.0	0.0	0.3	0.2	1.5
Yinka Dare	41	2	7.6	.352		.514	2.0	0.1	0.1	0.7	1.4
Vincent Askew	1	0	7.0				0.0	0.0	0.0	0.0	0.0

Player statistics citation:

== Awards and records ==
- Kerry Kittles, NBA All-Rookie Team 2nd Team
- Shawn Bradley, NBA 1996-1997 League Leader in Blocks

== See also ==
- 1996–97 NBA season
