= 1997–98 New Jersey Nets season =

NBA professional basketball team season

- Head coach: John Calipari
- General manager: John Nash
- Owners: Secaucus Seven
- Arena: Continental Airlines Arena

Results
- Record: 43–39 (.524)
- Place: Division: 3rd (Atlantic); Conference: 8th (Eastern)
- Playoff finish: First round (lost to Bulls 0–3)
- Stats at Basketball Reference

Local media
- Television: SportsChannel New York; WPXN
- Radio: WOR

The 1997–98 New Jersey Nets season was the Nets' 31st season in the National Basketball Association, and 22nd season in East Rutherford, New Jersey.

== Season summary ==
=== Off-season ===
The Nets received the seventh overall pick in the 1997 NBA draft, and selected small forward Tim Thomas out of Villanova University; however, the team soon traded Thomas to the Philadelphia 76ers in exchange for rookie power forward, and first-round draft pick Keith Van Horn from the University of Utah, Lucious Harris, Michael Cage and Don MacLean. On the first day of the regular season, which began on October 31, 1997, the team signed free agent Sherman Douglas.

For the season, the Nets redesigned their primary logo, replacing the color blue with dark navy blue and silver to their color scheme of red and white. The team's primary logo featured a dark navy blue shield with a silver outline, featuring the team name "Nets" in white letters with a red outline; below the team name featured a silver basketball with dark navy blue and white seams, going into a red hoop with a dark navy blue shadow underneath. The team also redesigned their home and road uniforms, which featured a dark navy blue, silver and red trim, and dark navy blue side panels with silver zig-zag inlines, next to silver and red outlines on their jerseys and shorts. The white home uniforms featured the word "Nets" on the front of their jerseys, while the road uniforms were changed from royal blue to dark navy blue, and featured the state name New Jersey; both uniforms featured the team's primary logo on the left leg of their shorts.

The team's new primary logo, and new home uniforms would both remain in use until 2012, while the new road uniforms would last until 2009.

=== Regular season ===
With the addition of Van Horn and Douglas, and despite Van Horn missing the first month of the regular season due to a preseason ankle injury, the Nets won their first four games, and played above .500 in winning percentage for the entire season, holding a 27–21 record at the All-Star break. At mid-season, the team traded David Benoit, Kevin Edwards and Yinka Dare to the Orlando Magic in exchange for Rony Seikaly, and second-year forward Brian Evans. Despite a seven-game losing streak between February and March, the Nets showed improvement by finishing in third place in the Atlantic Division with a 43–39 record, which earned them the eighth seed in the Eastern Conference, as the team qualified for the NBA playoffs.

Van Horn averaged 19.7 points and 6.6 rebounds per game in 62 games, and was named to the NBA All-Rookie First Team, while Sam Cassell averaged 19.6 points, 8.0 assists and 1.6 steals per game, and second-year star Kerry Kittles provided the team with 17.2 points and 1.7 steals per game, and led them with 110 three-point field goals. In addition, Kendall Gill contributed 13.4 points and 1.9 steals per game, while Jayson Williams provided with 12.9 points and 13.6 rebounds per game. Off the bench, sixth man Chris Gatling averaged 11.5 points and 5.9 rebounds per game, while Douglas contributed 8.0 points and 4.0 assists per game, Seikaly provided with 4.7 points and 4.0 rebounds per game in nine games after the trade, and Cage averaged 1.3 points and 3.9 rebounds per game.

During the NBA All-Star weekend at Madison Square Garden in New York City, New York, Williams was selected for the 1998 NBA All-Star Game, as a member of the Eastern Conference All-Star team; it was his first and only All-Star appearance. Meanwhile, Van Horn was selected for the NBA Rookie Game, as a member of the Eastern Conference Rookie team; Van Horn scored 17 points along with 10 rebounds, as the Eastern Conference defeated the Western Conference, 85–80. Van Horn also finished in second place in Rookie of the Year voting, behind Tim Duncan of the San Antonio Spurs, while Gill finished tied in eleventh place in Defensive Player of the Year voting, and head coach John Calipari finished tied in ninth place in Coach of the Year voting.

The Nets finished twelfth in the NBA in home-game attendance, with an attendance of 718,514 at the Continental Airlines Arena during the regular season.

=== NBA playoffs ===
In the Eastern Conference First Round of the 1998 NBA playoffs, the Nets faced off against the top–seeded, and 2-time defending NBA champion Chicago Bulls, who won the Central Division title, and were led by the trio of All-Star guard, and Most Valuable Player of the Year, Michael Jordan, All-Star forward Scottie Pippen, and rebound-specialist Dennis Rodman. However, the Nets dealt with injuries as Cassell had a strained groin, Williams had a broken thumb, and Van Horn had the stomach virus. The Nets lost Game 1 to the Bulls on the road in overtime, 96–93 at the United Center, before losing Game 2 on the road by a score of 96–91, in which the Bulls took a 2–0 series lead. The Nets lost Game 3 to the Bulls at home, 116–101 at the Continental Airlines Arena, thus losing the series in a three-game sweep.

The Bulls would go on to defeat the Utah Jazz in six games in the 1998 NBA Finals for their third consecutive NBA championship, and sixth overall in eight years.

=== Aftermath ===
Following the season, Douglas signed as a free agent with the Los Angeles Clippers, while Cage and MacLean were both traded to the Seattle SuperSonics, whom Cage used to play for, and Xavier McDaniel retired, although he was released to free agency in January.

== Off-season ==
=== NBA draft ===
Round	Pick	Player	Position	Nationality	College
1	7	Tim Thomas (traded to Philadelphia)	SF	United States	Villanova
1	21	Anthony Parker (from L.A. Lakers)	SG	United States	Bradley

== Roster ==
1997–98 New Jersey Nets roster
Players

Pos.	No.	Player	Height	Weight	DOB	From
C	45	Michael Cage	6 ft 9 in (2.06 m)	224 lb (102 kg)	1962-01-28	San Diego State
G	10	Sam Cassell	6 ft 3 in (1.91 m)	185 lb (84 kg)	1969-11-18	Florida State
G	20	Sherman Douglas	6 ft 0 in (1.83 m)	180 lb (82 kg)	1966-09-15	Syracuse
F	11	Brian Evans	6 ft 8 in (2.03 m)	220 lb (100 kg)	1973-09-13	Indiana
F	15	Chris Gatling	6 ft 10 in (2.08 m)	220 lb (100 kg)	1967-09-03	Old Dominion
F	13	Kendall Gill	6 ft 5 in (1.96 m)	195 lb (88 kg)	1968-05-25	Illinois
C	54	Jack Haley	6 ft 10 in (2.08 m)	240 lb (109 kg)	1964-01-27	UCLA
G	12	Lucious Harris	6 ft 5 in (1.96 m)	190 lb (86 kg)	1970-12-18	Long Beach State
G	30	Kerry Kittles	6 ft 5 in (1.96 m)	179 lb (81 kg)	1974-06-12	Villanova
F	24	Don MacLean	6 ft 10 in (2.08 m)	235 lb (107 kg)	1970-01-16	UCLA
C	2	Rony Seikaly	6 ft 11 in (2.11 m)	230 lb (104 kg)	1965-05-10	Syracuse
F	44	Keith Van Horn	6 ft 10 in (2.08 m)	220 lb (100 kg)	1975-10-23	Utah
F	42	David Vaughn	6 ft 9 in (2.06 m)	240 lb (109 kg)	1973-03-23	Memphis
C	55	Jayson Williams	6 ft 9 in (2.06 m)	240 lb (109 kg)	1968-02-22	St. John's

Coaches
Head coach
- John Calipari
Assistant(s)
- Don Casey
- Johnny Davis
- Kenny Gattison

Legend
- (DP) Unsigned draft pick
- (FA) Free agent
- (S) Suspended
- Injured

Roster
Updated: April 15, 1998

Roster notes

- Small forward Xavier McDaniel was waived on January 24, 1998.

== Regular season ==
The Nets began the season by winning their first four games, and maintained a winning record through all 82 games for the first time in the franchise's NBA history. The Nets clinched a playoff berth with a victory over the Detroit Pistons on the final day of the season. It was the Nets first postseason appearance since 1994, and the season brought excitement back to the Meadowlands. The heart and soul of the Nets was center Jayson Williams, who averaged 13.6 rebounds, (2nd in the NBA), and 12.9 points per game. Williams became the first Net to appear in an All-Star Game since Derrick Coleman in 1994. After missing the first 17 games of the season due to a leg injury, rookie Keith Van Horn quickly acclimated himself to the NBA game and led the Nets in scoring at 19.7 points per game. Another strong presence in the frontcourt was forward Kendall Gill, who averaged 13.4 points per game.

The Nets backcourt consisted of Sam Cassell and Kerry Kittles in the backcourt. Cassell ranked second on the team in scoring, behind Van Horn at 19.6 ppg, and led the Nets in assists with 8.0 apg. Kittles was in his second NBA season, and was third on the team in scoring with 17.2 ppg. The Nets bench included Sherman Douglas (8.0 ppg, 4.0 apg) and Chris Gatling (11.5 ppg, 5.9 rpg). Late in the season, the Nets added depth with the trade for Rony Seikaly, who joined the Nets in a five-player trade with the Orlando Magic on Feb. 19. Seikaly played in only nine games for New Jersey, because of a nagging injury to his right foot.

=== Season standings ===
Atlantic Division	W	L	PCT	GB	Home	Road	Div
y-Miami Heat	55	27	.671	–	30-11	25–16	18–6
x-New York Knicks	43	39	.524	12	28–13	15–26	13–11
x-New Jersey Nets	43	39	.524	12	26–15	17–24	12–12
Washington Wizards	42	40	.512	13	24–17	18–23	12–13
Orlando Magic	41	41	.500	14	24–17	17–24	11–13
Boston Celtics	36	46	.439	19	24–17	12–29	12–12
Philadelphia 76ers	31	51	.378	24	19–22	12–29	7–17

#	Eastern Conference				
#	Team	W	L	PCT	GB
1	c-Chicago Bulls	62	20	.756	–
2	y-Miami Heat	55	27	.671	7
3	x-Indiana Pacers	58	24	.707	4
4	x-Charlotte Hornets	51	31	.622	11
5	x-Atlanta Hawks	50	32	.610	12
6	x-Cleveland Cavaliers	47	35	.573	15
7	x-New York Knicks	43	39	.524	19
8	x-New Jersey Nets	43	39	.524	19
9	Washington Wizards	42	40	.512	20
10	Orlando Magic	41	41	.500	21
11	Detroit Pistons	37	45	.451	25
12	Boston Celtics	36	46	.439	26
13	Milwaukee Bucks	36	46	.439	26
14	Philadelphia 76ers	31	51	.378	31
15	Toronto Raptors	16	66	.195	46

== Playoffs ==
Injuries would become a problem in the playoffs for the Nets. In Game 1 against Chicago, Cassell nursed a strained groin and Williams played despite a broken thumb. Williams would manage to get 21 rebounds in the game. The Nets forced overtime at the United Center before falling by a score of 96–93. The Bulls ultimately swept the series, but the Nets' effort suggested that the team had a bright future.

1998 playoff game log
First Round: 0–3 (home: 0–1; road: 0–2)

Game	Date	Team	Score	High points	High rebounds	High assists	Location Attendance	Series
1	April 24	@ Chicago	L 93–96 (OT)	Chris Gatling (24)	Jayson Williams (21)	Sherman Douglas (5)	United Center; 23,844	0–1
2	April 26	@ Chicago	L 91–96	Kerry Kittles (23)	Jayson Williams (11)	Sherman Douglas (12)	United Center; 23,844	0–2
3	April 29	Chicago	L 101–116	Sherman Douglas (19)	Jayson Williams (10)	Sherman Douglas (8)	Continental Airlines Arena; 20,049	0–3

1998 schedule

== Player statistics ==
Legend
GP	Games played	GS	Games started	MPG	Minutes per game
FG%	Field-goal percentage	3P%	3-point field-goal percentage	FT%	Free-throw percentage
RPG	Rebounds per game	APG	Assists per game	SPG	Steals per game
BPG	Blocks per game	PPG	Points per game

=== Regular season ===
Legend
GP	Games played	GS	Games started	MPG	Minutes per game
FG%	Field-goal percentage	3P%	3-point field-goal percentage	FT%	Free-throw percentage
RPG	Rebounds per game	APG	Assists per game	SPG	Steals per game
BPG	Blocks per game	PPG	Points per game

New Jersey Nets statistics
Player	GP	GS	MPG	FG%	3P%	FT%	RPG	APG	SPG	BPG	PPG
Keith Van Horn	62	62	37.5	.426	.308	.846	6.6	1.7	1.0	0.4	19.7
Sam Cassell	75	72	34.7	.441	.188	.860	3.0	8.0	1.6	0.3	19.6
Kerry Kittles	77	76	36.5	.440	.418	.808	4.7	2.3	1.7	0.5	17.2
Kendall Gill	81	81	33.7	.429	.257	.688	4.8	2.5	1.9	0.8	13.4
Jayson Williams	65	65	36.0	.498	.000	.666	13.6	1.0	0.7	0.8	12.9
Chris Gatling	57	16	23.8	.455	.250	.600	5.9	0.9	0.9	0.5	11.5
Sherman Douglas	80	11	21.2	.495	.304	.669	1.7	4.0	0.7	0.1	8.0
David Benoit	53	0	15.1	.379	.345	.841	2.7	0.3	0.5	0.3	5.3
Rony Seikaly	9	2	16.9	.317		.593	4.0	0.9	0.3	0.4	4.7
Brian Evans	28	1	11.9	.434	.405	.667	1.9	0.9	0.3	0.2	4.1
Lucious Harris	50	0	13.4	.390	.308	.745	1.0	0.8	0.8	0.1	3.8
Kevin Edwards	27	5	13.0	.349	.364	.867	1.3	1.0	0.8	0.0	3.4
David Vaughn	15	2	10.7	.576		.667	3.3	0.1	0.3	0.3	2.9
Jack Haley	16	0	3.2	.278	.000	.571	0.9	0.0	0.0	0.1	1.4
Michael Cage	79	17	15.2	.512	.000	.556	3.9	0.4	0.6	0.6	1.3
Xavier McDaniel	20	0	9.0	.333		.625	1.6	0.5	0.2	0.1	1.3
Yinka Dare	10	0	6.0	.222		.500	1.7	0.1	0.0	0.2	1.2
Don MacLean	9	0	4.7	.100	.500		0.6	0.0	0.0	0.0	0.3

=== Playoffs ===
Legend
GP	Games played	GS	Games started	MPG	Minutes per game
FG%	Field-goal percentage	3P%	3-point field-goal percentage	FT%	Free-throw percentage
RPG	Rebounds per game	APG	Assists per game	SPG	Steals per game
BPG	Blocks per game	PPG	Points per game

New Jersey Nets statistics
Player	GP	GS	MPG	FG%	3P%	FT%	RPG	APG	SPG	BPG	PPG
Sherman Douglas	3	2	41.7	.523	.400	.700	2.7	8.3	2.0	0.0	18.3
Kerry Kittles	3	3	42.0	.425	.385	.909	5.0	2.7	1.3	0.7	16.3
Chris Gatling	3	1	27.0	.500		.667	3.3	0.7	0.7	0.7	15.3
Kendall Gill	3	3	33.3	.450		.875	4.3	1.0	1.3	0.3	14.3
Keith Van Horn	3	3	25.7	.448	.000	.800	3.0	0.3	0.0	0.0	12.7
Jayson Williams	3	2	38.7	.429		.500	14.0	1.7	0.7	1.0	7.0
Rony Seikaly	3	0	12.3	.778		.667	3.0	0.0	0.3	0.0	6.0
Lucious Harris	3	0	17.3	.333	.000	.833	2.7	0.3	0.7	0.0	3.0
Sam Cassell	3	1	8.7	.333			1.0	1.7	0.0	0.3	2.0
Brian Evans	3	0	1.3				0.3	0.0	0.0	0.0	0.0
David Vaughn	1	0	1.0				0.0	0.0	0.0	1.0	0.0

Player statistics citation:

== Awards, Records and Honors ==
- Jayson Williams, NBA All-Star Game
- Keith Van Horn, NBA All-Rookie Team 1st Team
