= Yinka Dare =

Nigerian basketball player (1972-2004)

Personal information
- Born: October 10, 1972 Kano, Nigeria
- Died: January 9, 2004 (aged 31) Englewood, New Jersey, U.S.
- Listed height: 7 ft 0 in (2.13 m)
- Listed weight: 265 lb (120 kg)

Career information
- High school: Milford Academy (New Berlin, New York)
- College: George Washington (1992–1994)
- NBA draft: 1994: 1st round, 14th overall pick
- Drafted by: New Jersey Nets
- Playing career: 1994–2003
- Position: Center
- Number: 11, 33

Career history
- 1994–1998: New Jersey Nets
- 1998–1999: New Jersey Shorecats
- 1999–2000: Fort Wayne Fury
- 2003: Pennsylvania ValleyDawgs

Career highlights
- Atlantic 10 Rookie of the Year (1993); 2× Second-team All-Atlantic 10 (1993, 1994)

Career NBA statistics
- Points: 233 (2.1 ppg)
- Rebounds: 281 (2.6 rpg)
- Blocks: 70 (0.6 bpg)
- Stats at NBA.com
- Stats at Basketball Reference

Yinka Dare DAR-eh (October 10, 1972 – January 9, 2004) was a Nigerian professional basketball player. A 7 ft 0 in (2.13 m), 265-pound (120 kg) center, he played four seasons in the National Basketball Association (NBA).

== Early years ==
Born in Kano, Dare was discovered by Nigerian-born lawyer Lloyd Ukwu during a visit to Lagos in 1991. While Ukwu was driving, he noticed a very tall man sitting on a bench eating a bowl of food. When he asked him how tall he was, Dare said he didn't know.

Dare had previously spent most of his free time playing tennis, but soon picked up basketball for the first time.

== High school/college career ==
Already in the United States, Dare played one season at Milford Academy High, a prep school in New Berlin, New York. Subsequently, he played college basketball for George Washington University, where he excelled as a player under coach Mike Jarvis, also helping revive the basketball program. As a freshman in 1992–93, he led the Colonials to the NCAA Tournament round of 16 ("The Sweet 16"), the furthest they had ever advanced.

The next year, Dare led the team to the second round of the tournament. He finished his college career averaging 13.8 points and 10.7 rebounds per game; additionally, after just two seasons, he had become the Colonials' all-time leader in blocked shots, averaging more than two per game.

== Professional career ==
Dare was selected in the first round (14th overall) of the 1994 NBA draft by the New Jersey Nets. He would sign a six-year, US$9 million guaranteed contract. In the NBA, he would appear in 110 games in four seasons, all with the Nets; in his rookie campaign, he played for three minutes before getting injured (torn ACL) and missing the rest of the season.

In his first full season (1995–96), in which he played a personal best 58 out of 82 games, he turned the ball over 72 times while registering no assists, holding the dubious NBA record for most games played in a season, 58 (769 minutes), without recording an assist. During his four-year career, he would rack up a total of four assists accompanied by 96 turnovers, while averaging 2.1 points, 2.6 rebounds, and less than 0.1 assists per game.

In early 1998, Dare was traded, along with David Benoit, Kevin Edwards, and a first round draft pick to the Orlando Magic, for Brian Evans and Rony Seikaly. He was almost immediately waived so the Magic could sign point guard Spud Webb. Dare's next involvement in the NBA would be receiving a training camp invite to join the Golden State Warriors in 2000; he was released before the start of the season. He would play intermittently in other leagues including the Continental Basketball Association and United States Basketball League, until 2003.

== Death ==
On January 9, 2004, Dare died after collapsing in his home in Englewood, New Jersey. A medical examiner determined that he had suffered a heart attack due to an arrhythmia condition discovered when he was in college. Dare was two weeks away from joining a team in Israel for another professional basketball season.

Lucious Harris, who joined the Nets in 1997–98, Dare's final season, said: "It's a bad situation. I feel for his family. Just 32, to have a heart attack, that's scary. It always seemed like he was in shape. But things happen and you don't understand why."

Kerry Kittles, who played with Dare in the latter's final two seasons with the Nets, said: "He was a quiet guy, didn't talk that much. He worked hard—he didn't really play much, but he was a fun guy to be around. [He was] young: It makes you think... anything can happen any time. It's in the back of your mind [that] it could happen to you."

Jarvis, who coached Dare at George Washington, told The Washington Post: "Yinka was a kind, gentle person. He was nice to my family, as respectful as anybody I've come into contact with. I don't remember him having a bad word to say about anybody; just a nice, sweet kid."

Dare was survived by parents Gabriel and Joan, two sisters and a brother.

== Other appearances ==
- Dare appears as a playable character in the Sega Genesis and Super NES ports of NBA Jam Tournament Edition as a "bonus" player, available on the all-rookie squad at the onset of the game.
- He appeared in a Puma shoe commercial.

== Career statistics ==
Legend
GP	Games played	GS	Games started	MPG	Minutes per game
FG%	Field goal percentage	3P%	3-point field goal percentage	FT%	Free throw percentage
RPG	Rebounds per game	APG	Assists per game	SPG	Steals per game
BPG	Blocks per game	PPG	Points per game	**Bold**	Career high

=== NBA ===
==== Regular season ====
Year	Team	GP	GS	MPG	FG%	3P%	FT%	RPG	APG	SPG	BPG	PPG
1994–95	New Jersey	1	0	3.0	.000	–	–	1.0	.0	.0	.0	.0
1995–96	New Jersey	**58**	**23**	**10.8**	**.438**	–	**.613**	**3.1**	.0	**.1**	**.7**	**2.8**
1996–97	New Jersey	41	2	7.6	.352	–	.514	2.0	**.1**	**.1**	**.7**	1.4
1997–98	New Jersey	10	0	6.0	.222	–	.500	1.7	**.1**	.0	.2	1.2
Career		110	25	9.1	.396	–	.570	2.6	.0	.1	.6	2.1
