= 1997–98 Miami Heat season =

NBA professional basketball team season

- Division champions
- Head coach: Pat Riley
- President: Pat Riley
- General manager: Randy Pfund
- Owner: Micky Arison
- Arena: Miami Arena

Results
- Record: 55–27 (.671)
- Place: Division: 1st (Atlantic); Conference: 2nd (Eastern)
- Playoff finish: First round (lost to Knicks 2–3)
- Stats at Basketball Reference

Local media
- Television: WBFS-TV; Sunshine Network
- Radio: WIOD

The 1997–98 Miami Heat season was the tenth season for the Miami Heat in the National Basketball Association.

== Season summary ==
=== Off-season ===
During the off-season, the Heat signed free agents Eric Murdock, three-point specialist Terry Mills, Todd Day, and acquired Duane Causwell from the Sacramento Kings. However, after only playing just five games for the Heat, Day was released to free agency after criticizing how head coach Pat Riley ran the team.

=== Regular season ===
Despite Alonzo Mourning missing the first 22 games of the regular season due to an off-season knee injury, the Heat got off to a 14–5 start to the season, as backup center Isaac Austin filled in the void as the team's starting center in Mourning's absence. Mourning eventually returned as the team later on held a 30–17 record at the All-Star break. At mid-season, the Heat traded Austin to the Los Angeles Clippers in exchange for Brent Barry; before the trade, Austin averaged 12.7 points and 6.3 rebounds per game in 52 games. Despite losing Jamal Mashburn to a thumb injury after 48 games, the team posted a 13–2 record in February, which included a 10-game winning streak between February and March, and then posted a seven-game winning streak in March. The Heat finished in first place in the Atlantic Division with a 55–27 record, and earned the second seed in the Eastern Conference.

Tim Hardaway averaged 18.9 points, 8.3 assists and 1.7 steals per game, led the Heat with 155 three-point field goals, and was named to the All-NBA Second Team, while Mourning averaged 19.2 points, 9.6 rebounds and 2.2 blocks per game in 58 games, and Mashburn provided the team with 15.1 points per game. In addition, Voshon Lenard contributed 12.3 points per game and 153 three-point field goals, while P.J. Brown provided with 9.6 points, 8.6 rebounds and 1.3 blocks per game. Off the bench, three-point specialist Dan Majerle contributed 7.2 points per game and 111 three-point field goals, while Mark Strickland averaged 6.8 points and 4.2 rebounds per game, Murdock provided with 6.2 points, 2.7 assists and 1.3 steals per game, and Mills contributed 4.2 points and 3.0 rebounds per game.

During the NBA All-Star weekend at Madison Square Garden in New York City, New York, Hardaway was selected for the 1998 NBA All-Star Game, as a member of the Eastern Conference All-Star team; it was his fifth and final All-Star appearance. Hardaway was also booed by the fans at Madison Square Garden during the All-Star introductions, due to the Heat–Knicks rivalry. Hardaway finished in sixth place in Most Valuable Player voting, while Riley finished in fourth place in Coach of the Year voting. The Heat had the sixth best team defensive rating in the NBA.

The Heat finished 23rd in the NBA in home-game attendance, with an attendance of 614,861 at the Miami Arena during the regular season.

=== NBA playoffs ===
In the Eastern Conference First Round of the 1998 NBA playoffs, the Heat faced off against the 7th–seeded New York Knicks for the second consecutive year. All-Star center Patrick Ewing was out due to a season-ending wrist injury, as the Knicks were led by Allan Houston, Larry Johnson, and sixth man John Starks. Despite losing Majerle for the remainder of the series to a groin injury in Game 2, in which the Heat lost to the Knicks at home, 96–86 at the Miami Arena, the Heat managed to win Game 3 on the road at Madison Square Garden, 91–85 to take a 2–1 series lead.

However, in Game 4 at Madison Square Garden, Mourning and Johnson, both former teammates on the Charlotte Hornets, got into a brawl in the closing seconds as the Knicks won the game, 90–85 to tie the series at 2–2; Mourning and Johnson were both suspended for two games. Without Mourning, the Heat lost Game 5 to the Knicks at the Miami Arena, 98–81, thus losing in a hard-fought five-game series.

=== Aftermath ===
Following the season, Barry, who did not participate in the NBA playoffs, due to a season-ending ankle injury after playing 17 games with the Heat, signed as a free agent with the Chicago Bulls, and Murdock signed with the New Jersey Nets.

== Offseason ==
=== Draft picks ===
Round	Pick	Player	Position	Nationality	School/Club team
1	26	Charles Smith	SG	United States	University of New Mexico
2	30	Mark Sanford	F	United States	University of Washington

== Roster ==
1997–98 Miami Heat roster
Players

Pos.	No.	Player	Height	Weight	DOB	From
F	2	Keith Askins	6 ft 7 in (2.01 m)	197 lb (89 kg)	1967–12–15	Alabama
G/F	17	Brent Barry	6 ft 6 in (1.98 m)	185 lb (84 kg)	1971–12–31	Oregon State
F	42	P. J. Brown	6 ft 11 in (2.11 m)	225 lb (102 kg)	1969–10–14	Louisiana Tech
C	31	Duane Causwell	7 ft 0 in (2.13 m)	240 lb (109 kg)	1968–05–31	Temple
C	40	Marty Conlon	6 ft 10 in (2.08 m)	224 lb (102 kg)	1968–01–19	Providence
G	10	Tim Hardaway	6 ft 0 in (1.83 m)	175 lb (79 kg)	1966–09–01	UTEP
F	22	Antonio Lang	6 ft 8 in (2.03 m)	205 lb (93 kg)	1972–05–15	Duke
G	21	Voshon Lenard	6 ft 4 in (1.93 m)	205 lb (93 kg)	1973–05–14	Minnesota
G/F	9	Dan Majerle	6 ft 6 in (1.98 m)	215 lb (98 kg)	1965–09–09	Central Michigan
F	24	Jamal Mashburn	6 ft 8 in (2.03 m)	240 lb (109 kg)	1972–11–29	Kentucky
F	6	Terry Mills	6 ft 10 in (2.08 m)	230 lb (104 kg)	1967–12–21	Michigan
C	33	Alonzo Mourning	6 ft 10 in (2.08 m)	240 lb (109 kg)	1970–02–08	Georgetown
G	5	Eric Murdock	6 ft 1 in (1.85 m)	190 lb (86 kg)	1968–06–14	Providence
F	30	Mark Strickland	6 ft 9 in (2.06 m)	210 lb (95 kg)	1970–07–14	Temple
G	23	Rex Walters	6 ft 4 in (1.93 m)	190 lb (86 kg)	1970–03–12	Kansas

Coaches
Head coach
- Pat Riley
Assistant(s)
- Jeff Bzdelik
- Tony Fiorentino
- Bob McAdoo
- Erik Spoelstra
- Stan Van Gundy

Legend
- (DP) Unsigned draft pick
- (FA) Free agent
- (S) Suspended
- Injured

Roster
Updated: March 16, 1998

== Regular season ==
=== Season standings ===
Atlantic Division	W	L	PCT	GB	Home	Road	Div
y-Miami Heat	55	27	.671	–	30-11	25–16	18–6
x-New York Knicks	43	39	.524	12	28–13	15–26	13–11
x-New Jersey Nets	43	39	.524	12	26–15	17–24	12–12
Washington Wizards	42	40	.512	13	24–17	18–23	12–13
Orlando Magic	41	41	.500	14	24–17	17–24	11–13
Boston Celtics	36	46	.439	19	24–17	12–29	12–12
Philadelphia 76ers	31	51	.378	24	19–22	12–29	7–17

#	Eastern Conference				
#	Team	W	L	PCT	GB
1	c-Chicago Bulls	62	20	.756	–
2	y-Miami Heat	55	27	.671	7
3	x-Indiana Pacers	58	24	.707	4
4	x-Charlotte Hornets	51	31	.622	11
5	x-Atlanta Hawks	50	32	.610	12
6	x-Cleveland Cavaliers	47	35	.573	15
7	x-New York Knicks	43	39	.524	19
8	x-New Jersey Nets	43	39	.524	19
9	Washington Wizards	42	40	.512	20
10	Orlando Magic	41	41	.500	21
11	Detroit Pistons	37	45	.451	25
12	Boston Celtics	36	46	.439	26
13	Milwaukee Bucks	36	46	.439	26
14	Philadelphia 76ers	31	51	.378	31
15	Toronto Raptors	16	66	.195	46

== Playoffs ==
1998 playoff game log
First round: 2–3 (home: 1–1; road: 1–2)

Game	Date	Team	Score	High points	High rebounds	High assists	Location Attendance	Series
1	April 24	New York	W 94–79	Tim Hardaway (34)	P. J. Brown (10)	Eric Murdock (5)	Miami Arena; 15,200	1–0
2	April 26	New York	L 86–96	Alonzo Mourning (30)	Alonzo Mourning (13)	Tim Hardaway (7)	Miami Arena; 15,200	1–1
3	April 28	@ New York	W 91–85	Voshon Lenard (28)	Alonzo Mourning (9)	Tim Hardaway (7)	Madison Square Garden; 19,763	2–1
4	April 30	@ New York	L 85–90	Tim Hardaway (33)	P. J. Brown (9)	Tim Hardaway (9)	Madison Square Garden; 19,763	2–2
5	May 3	New York	L 81–98	Tim Hardaway (21)	P. J. Brown (10)	Tim Hardaway (8)	Miami Arena; 15,200	2–3

1998 schedule

== Player statistics ==
=== Ragular season ===
Player	POS	GP	GS	MP	REB	AST	STL	BLK	PTS	MPG	RPG	APG	SPG	BPG	PPG
Eric Murdock	PG	82	1	1,395	156	219	103	13	507	17.0	1.9	2.7	1.3	.2	6.2
Tim Hardaway	PG	81	81	3,031	299	672	136	16	1,528	37.4	3.7	8.3	1.7	.2	18.9
Voshon Lenard	SG	81	81	2,621	292	180	58	16	1,020	32.4	3.6	2.2	.7	.2	12.6
P. J. Brown	PF	74	74	2,362	635	103	66	98	707	31.9	8.6	1.4	.9	1.3	9.6
Dan Majerle	SG	72	22	1,928	268	157	68	15	519	26.8	3.7	2.2	.9	.2	7.2
Alonzo Mourning	C	58	56	1,939	558	52	40	130	1,115	33.4	9.6	.9	.7	2.2	19.2
Isaac Austin^{†}	C	52	25	1,371	330	87	43	34	659	26.4	6.3	1.7	.8	.7	12.7
Mark Strickland	PF	51	8	847	213	26	18	34	349	16.6	4.2	.5	.4	.7	6.8
Terry Mills	PF	50	0	782	152	39	19	9	212	15.6	3.0	.8	.4	.2	4.2
Jamal Mashburn	SF	48	48	1,729	236	132	43	14	723	36.0	4.9	2.8	.9	.3	15.1
Keith Askins	SF	46	12	681	101	29	27	12	111	14.8	2.2	.6	.6	.3	2.4
Duane Causwell	C	37	2	363	99	5	7	27	89	9.8	2.7	.1	.2	.7	2.4
Rex Walters^{†}	SG	19	0	108	15	14	3	1	38	5.7	.8	.7	.2	.1	2.0
Marty Conlon	C	18	0	209	46	12	9	5	88	11.6	2.6	.7	.5	.3	4.9
Brent Barry^{†}	SG	17	0	259	28	21	14	4	70	15.2	1.6	1.2	.8	.2	4.1
Charles Smith^{†}	SG	11	0	32	8	2	2	1	10	2.9	.7	.2	.2	.1	.9
Antonio Lang	SF	6	0	29	5	1	2	0	12	4.8	.8	.2	.3	.0	2.0
Todd Day	SG	5	0	69	6	7	7	0	30	13.8	1.2	1.4	1.4	.0	6.0

- ^{†} Denotes player spent time with another team in the season. Stats reflect time with the Heat only.

=== Playoffs ===
Player	POS	GP	GS	MP	REB	AST	STL	BLK	PTS	MPG	RPG	APG	SPG	BPG	PPG
Tim Hardaway	PG	5	5	222	17	33	6	0	130	44.4	3.4	6.6	1.2	.0	26.0
P. J. Brown	PF	5	5	190	44	4	7	3	46	38.0	8.8	.8	1.4	.6	9.2
Voshon Lenard	SG	5	5	186	19	7	1	2	72	37.2	3.8	1.4	.2	.4	14.4
Jamal Mashburn	SF	5	3	129	22	9	3	1	31	25.8	4.4	1.8	.6	.2	6.2
Eric Murdock	PG	5	0	125	20	15	7	0	47	25.0	4.0	3.0	1.4	.0	9.4
Alonzo Mourning	C	4	4	138	34	5	3	10	77	34.5	8.5	1.3	.8	2.5	19.3
Keith Askins	SF	4	0	58	7	1	2	0	5	14.5	1.8	.3	.5	.0	1.3
Marty Conlon	C	3	0	46	4	3	1	1	7	15.3	1.3	1.0	.3	.3	2.3
Mark Strickland	PF	3	0	28	7	0	0	1	9	9.3	2.3	.0	.0	.3	3.0
Dan Majerle	SG	2	2	62	5	5	4	1	9	31.0	2.5	2.5	2.0	.5	4.5
Terry Mills	PF	2	0	11	3	0	0	0	4	5.5	1.5	.0	.0	.0	2.0
Duane Causwell	C	1	1	5	2	0	0	0	0	5.0	2.0	.0	.0	.0	.0

== Awards and records ==
- Tim Hardaway, All-NBA Second Team
