= Jack Haley (basketball) =

American professional basketball player (born 1964)

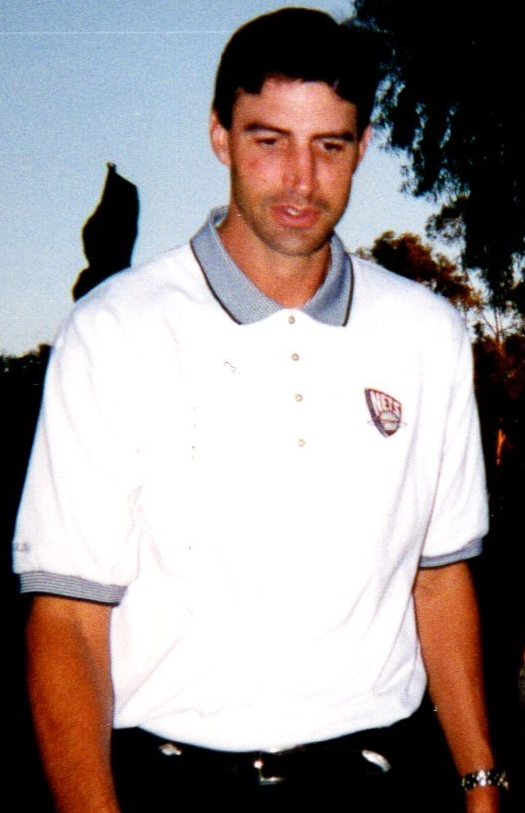
- Haley in 1998

Personal information
- Born: January 27, 1964 Long Beach, California, U.S.
- Died: March 16, 2015 (aged 51) Los Alamitos, California, U.S.
- Listed height: 6 ft 10 in (2.08 m)
- Listed weight: 240 lb (109 kg)

Career information
- High school: Huntington Beach (Huntington Beach, California)
- College: Golden West (1983–1984); UCLA (1984–1987)
- NBA draft: 1987: 4th round, 79th overall pick
- Drafted by: Chicago Bulls
- Playing career: 1987–1998

Career history
- 1987–1988: RCD Espanyol
- 1988–1989: Chicago Bulls
- 1989–1991: New Jersey Nets
- 1991–1992: Los Angeles Lakers
- 1993: AEK Athens
- 1993–1995: San Antonio Spurs
- 1995–1996: Chicago Bulls
- 1996–1997: La Crosse Bobcats
- 1997–1998: New Jersey Nets

Career highlights
- NBA champion (1996)

Career NBA statistics
- Points: 1,180 (3.5 ppg)
- Rebounds: 922 (2.7 rpg)
- Assists: 82 (0.2 apg)
- Stats at NBA.com
- Stats at Basketball Reference

Jack Kevin Haley (January 27, 1964 – March 16, 2015) was an American professional basketball player.

A 6'10" power forward/center from Huntington Beach High School and UCLA, Haley spent nine seasons (1988–1992; 1993–1998) in the National Basketball Association as a member of the Chicago Bulls, New Jersey Nets, Los Angeles Lakers, and San Antonio Spurs.

== Early life and education ==
Haley was the son of noted surfing pioneer Jack Haley Sr. He attended Huntington Beach High School and UCLA.

== Professional career ==
Haley was drafted in 1987 by the Chicago Bulls and made his NBA debut on November 9, 1988.

After several years playing elsewhere, Haley returned to the Bulls as a free agent in October 1995 and was a member of the 1995–96 Bulls team that won a league record 72 games and the NBA Championship. However, Haley spent almost the entire season on the injured list with tendinitis in his left knee. As a result, he only played in one game during the regular season and did not participate in the playoffs. At one point, another unidentified team complained to the league office, which sent out a doctor to examine Haley's knee. At the same time, Haley developed a reputation for his enthusiastic cheering of his teammates on the Bulls' bench all season long, compared to what one newspaper described as a more somber Bulls' bench.

On Sunday, April 21, 1996, Haley played in the Bulls' final regular-season game, drawing what the Chicago Tribune called "polite—albeit sarcastic—reception from the crowd." Haley ended up with five points. "It felt good to finally get in a game," he told the paper. "I was real excited and my adrenaline was pumping. I haven't played in a year. I missed some easy shots. I guess I was aggressive. I took almost a shot per minute played."

Haley was mainly known for his friendship with Dennis Rodman, and was sometimes referred to as Rodman's "babysitter". However, Haley bristled at the label, and argued that he had legitimately earned his spot on the team.

== NBA career statistics ==
Legend
| GP | Games played | GS | Games started | MPG | Minutes per game |
| FG% | Field goal percentage | 3P% | 3-point field goal percentage | FT% | Free throw percentage |
| RPG | Rebounds per game | APG | Assists per game | SPG | Steals per game |
| BPG | Blocks per game | PPG | Points per game | **Bold** | Career high |
| † | Won an NBA championship |

=== Regular season ===
| Year | Team | GP | GS | MPG | FG% | 3P% | FT% | RPG | APG | SPG | BPG | PPG |
|---|---|---|---|---|---|---|---|---|---|---|---|---|
| 1988–89 | Chicago | 51 | 1 | 5.7 | **.474** | – | .783 | 1.4 | .2 | .2 | .0 | 2.2 |
| 1989–90 | Chicago | 11 | 0 | 5.3 | .450 | – | **1.000** | 1.6 | **.4** | .0 | .1 | 2.3 |
| 1989–90 | New Jersey | 56 | **26** | **18.3** | .394 | .000 | .661 | **5.0** | **.4** | **.3** | .2 | **6.0** |
| 1990–91 | New Jersey | **78** | 18 | 15.1 | .469 | – | .619 | 4.6 | **.4** | **.3** | **.3** | 5.6 |
| 1991–92 | L.A. Lakers | 49 | 9 | 8.0 | .369 | – | .483 | 1.9 | .1 | .1 | .2 | 1.6 |
| 1993–94 | San Antonio | 28 | 0 | 3.4 | .438 | – | .810 | .9 | .0 | .0 | .0 | 2.1 |
| 1994–95 | San Antonio | 31 | 0 | 3.8 | .426 | .000 | .656 | .9 | .1 | .1 | .2 | 2.4 |
| 1995–96† | Chicago | 1 | 0 | 7.0 | .333 | – | .500 | 2.0 | .0 | .0 | .0 | 5.0 |
| 1996–97 | New Jersey | 20 | 0 | 3.7 | .351 | – | .737 | 1.6 | .3 | .1 | .1 | 2.0 |
| 1997–98 | New Jersey | 16 | 0 | 3.2 | .278 | .000 | .571 | .9 | .0 | .0 | .1 | 1.4 |
| Career | | 341 | 54 | 9.6 | .425 | .000 | .655 | 2.7 | .2 | .2 | .1 | 3.5 |

=== Playoffs ===
| Year | Team | GP | GS | MPG | FG% | 3P% | FT% | RPG | APG | SPG | BPG | PPG |
|---|---|---|---|---|---|---|---|---|---|---|---|---|
| 1989 | Chicago | **5** | 0 | 1.4 | **.667** | – | .500 | .2 | .2 | .0 | .0 | 1.0 |
| 1992 | L.A. Lakers | 2 | 0 | **6.0** | .250 | – | – | .5 | .5 | .0 | .0 | 1.0 |
| 1994 | San Antonio | 3 | 0 | 3.7 | .500 | – | **.833** | **2.3** | **.7** | .0 | .0 | **4.3** |
| 1995 | San Antonio | 4 | 0 | 3.3 | .143 | – | .500 | 1.5 | .0 | .0 | **.3** | .8 |
| Career | | 14 | 0 | 3.1 | .364 | – | .700 | 1.1 | .3 | .0 | .1 | 1.6 |

== Post-playing career ==
Following his playing career, Haley served as an assistant coach for the New Jersey Nets and as a television broadcaster for the Lakers, co-hosting the Lakers Live pre-game show with Bill Macdonald for Fox Sports Net West/Prime Ticket. Haley also acted, appearing in the films Eddie and Rebound, as well as the music video for Aerosmith's "Love in an Elevator."

== Death ==
Haley died on March 16, 2015, of heart disease at age 51. On April 16, 2015, a memorial service at the Walter Pyramid in Long Beach was attended by family and friends, including notable NBA players and coaches.
