= 1997–98 Milwaukee Bucks season =

NBA professional basketball team season

- Head coach: Chris Ford
- General manager: Bob Weinhauer
- Owner: Herb Kohl
- Arena: Bradley Center

Results
- Record: 36–46 (.439)
- Place: Division: 7th (Central); Conference: 13th (Eastern)
- Playoff finish: Did not qualify
- Stats at Basketball Reference

Local media
- Television: WVTV; Wisconsin Sports Network (Jim Paschke, Jon McGlocklin)
- Radio: WTMJ

The 1997–98 Milwaukee Bucks season was the 30th season for the Milwaukee Bucks in the National Basketball Association.

== Season summary ==
=== Off-season ===
The Bucks received the tenth overall pick in the 1997 NBA draft, and selected power forward Danny Fortson from the University of Cincinnati, but soon traded him to the Denver Nuggets in exchange for Ervin Johnson on draft day. During the off-season, the team acquired All-Star guard Terrell Brandon, and former All-Star forward Tyrone Hill from the Cleveland Cavaliers in a three-team trade, signed free agent Michael Curry, and re-signed former Bucks star and sixth man Ricky Pierce in December.

=== Regular season ===
With the addition of Brandon, Hill, Johnson and Curry, the Bucks won four of their first five games of the regular season. However, after an 11–8 start to the season, the team posted a five-game losing streak in December afterwards, and fell below .500 in winning percentage. After holding an 18–22 record as of January 20, 1998, the Bucks recovered and posted a six-game winning streak between January and February, and held a 24–23 record at the All-Star break. However, the team dealt with injuries as Glenn Robinson only played 56 games due to a left knee injury, and was out for the remainder of the season, while Brandon only played just 50 games due to an ankle injury, and Hill only appeared in 57 games due to a knee injury, and a strained back. The Bucks struggled posting a nine-game losing streak in March, while losing 13 of their 16 games during that month, and finished in seventh place in the Central Division with a 36–46 record; the team missed the NBA playoffs for the seventh consecutive year.

Robinson averaged 23.4 points and 5.5 rebounds per game, while second-year star Ray Allen had a stellar season, averaging 19.5 points, 4.3 assists and 1.4 steals per game, and leading the Bucks with 134 three-point field goals, and Brandon provided the team with 16.8 points, 7.7 assists and 2.2 steals per game. In addition, Hill contributed 10.0 points and 10.7 rebounds per game, while Armen Gilliam provided with 11.2 points and 5.4 rebounds per game, Johnson averaged 8.0 points, 8.5 rebounds and 2.0 blocks per game, Elliot Perry provided with 7.3 points and 2.8 assists per game, and Curry contributed 6.6 points per game.

Curry finished tied in sixth place in Sixth Man of the Year voting. The Bucks finished 22nd in the NBA in home-game attendance, with an attendance of 638,034 at the Bradley Center during the regular season.

=== Notable highlights ===
One notable highlight of the regular season occurred on January 2, 1998, in a road game against the 2-time defending NBA champion Chicago Bulls at the United Center. Robinson and All-Star guard Michael Jordan both scored 44 points each, while Brandon and Gilliam both posted double-doubles, as Brandon scored 24 points along with 13 assists, and Gilliam contributed 18 points and 11 rebounds. However, the Bucks lost to the Bulls by a score of 114–100. Despite a stellar season, Robinson was not selected for the 1998 NBA All-Star Game in New York City, New York.

=== Aftermath ===
Following the season, Pierce retired after playing in his second stint with the Bucks, while Andrew Lang signed as a free agent with the Chicago Bulls, and head coach Chris Ford was fired after two seasons with the Bucks.

== Draft picks ==
| Round | Pick | Player | Position | Nationality | College |
|---|---|---|---|---|---|
| 1 | 10 | Danny Fortson | PF | United States | Cincinnati |
| 2 | 38 | Jerald Honeycutt | SF | United States | Tulane |

== Roster ==
1997–98 Milwaukee Bucks roster
Players

| Pos. | No. | Player | Height | Weight | DOB | From |
|---|---|---|---|---|---|---|
| G | 34 | Ray Allen | 6 ft 5 in (1.96 m) | 205 lb (93 kg) | 1975–07–20 | Connecticut |
| G | 7 | Terrell Brandon | 5 ft 11 in (1.80 m) | 180 lb (82 kg) | 1970–05–20 | Oregon |
| G/F | 12 | Michael Curry | 6 ft 5 in (1.96 m) | 210 lb (95 kg) | 1968–08–22 | Georgia Southern |
| C | 11 | Jamie Feick | 6 ft 9 in (2.06 m) | 255 lb (116 kg) | 1974–07–03 | Michigan State |
| F | 10 | Armen Gilliam | 6 ft 9 in (2.06 m) | 230 lb (104 kg) | 1964–05–28 | UNLV |
| G | 9 | Litterial Green | 6 ft 1 in (1.85 m) | 185 lb (84 kg) | 1970–03–07 | Georgia |
| F | 42 | Tyrone Hill | 6 ft 9 in (2.06 m) | 240 lb (109 kg) | 1968–03–19 | Xavier |
| F | 25 | Jerald Honeycutt | 6 ft 9 in (2.06 m) | 245 lb (111 kg) | 1974–10–20 | Tulane |
| C | 40 | Ervin Johnson | 6 ft 11 in (2.11 m) | 245 lb (111 kg) | 1967–12–21 | LSU New Orleans |
| C | 28 | Andrew Lang | 6 ft 11 in (2.11 m) | 245 lb (111 kg) | 1966–06–28 | Arkansas |
| G | 5 | Elliot Perry | 6 ft 0 in (1.83 m) | 150 lb (68 kg) | 1969–03–28 | Memphis |
| G | 22 | Ricky Pierce | 6 ft 4 in (1.93 m) | 205 lb (93 kg) | 1959–08–19 | Rice |
| F | 13 | Glenn Robinson (injured) | 6 ft 7 in (2.01 m) | 240 lb (109 kg) | 1973–01–10 | Purdue |

Coaches
Head coach
- Chris Ford
Assistant(s)
- Jim Todd
- Dick Versace
- Mike Woodson

Legend
- (DP) Unsigned draft pick
- (FA) Free agent
- (S) Suspended
- Injured

Roster

== Regular season ==
=== Season standings ===
| Central Division | W | L | PCT | GB | Home | Road | Div |
|---|---|---|---|---|---|---|---|
| y-Chicago Bulls | 62 | 20 | .756 | – | 37–4 | 25–16 | 21–7 |
| x-Indiana Pacers | 58 | 24 | .707 | 4 | 32–9 | 26–15 | 19–9 |
| x-Charlotte Hornets | 51 | 31 | .622 | 11 | 32–9 | 19–22 | 16–12 |
| x-Atlanta Hawks | 50 | 32 | .610 | 12 | 29–12 | 21–20 | 19–9 |
| x-Cleveland Cavaliers | 47 | 35 | .573 | 15 | 27–14 | 20–21 | 14–14 |
| Detroit Pistons | 37 | 45 | .451 | 25 | 25–16 | 12–29 | 12–16 |
| Milwaukee Bucks | 36 | 46 | .439 | 26 | 21–20 | 15–26 | 9–19 |
| Toronto Raptors | 16 | 66 | .195 | 46 | 9–32 | 7–34 | 2–26 |

| # | Eastern Conference | | | | |
| # | Team | W | L | PCT | GB |
|---|---|---|---|---|---|
| 1 | c-Chicago Bulls | 62 | 20 | .756 | – |
| 2 | y-Miami Heat | 55 | 27 | .671 | 7 |
| 3 | x-Indiana Pacers | 58 | 24 | .707 | 4 |
| 4 | x-Charlotte Hornets | 51 | 31 | .622 | 11 |
| 5 | x-Atlanta Hawks | 50 | 32 | .610 | 12 |
| 6 | x-Cleveland Cavaliers | 47 | 35 | .573 | 15 |
| 7 | x-New York Knicks | 43 | 39 | .524 | 19 |
| 8 | x-New Jersey Nets | 43 | 39 | .524 | 19 |
| 9 | Washington Wizards | 42 | 40 | .512 | 20 |
| 10 | Orlando Magic | 41 | 41 | .500 | 21 |
| 11 | Detroit Pistons | 37 | 45 | .451 | 25 |
| 12 | Boston Celtics | 36 | 46 | .439 | 26 |
| 13 | Milwaukee Bucks | 36 | 46 | .439 | 26 |
| 14 | Philadelphia 76ers | 31 | 51 | .378 | 31 |
| 15 | Toronto Raptors | 16 | 66 | .195 | 46 |

z - clinched division title
y - clinched division title
x - clinched playoff spot

=== Game log ===
1997–98 game log
Total: 36–46 (Home: 3–1; Road: 2–1)
October: 1–0 (home: 0–0; road: 1–0)

| Game | Date | Team | Score | High points | High rebounds | High assists | Location Attendance | Record |
|---|---|---|---|---|---|---|---|---|
| 1 | October 31, 1997 | @ Philadelphia | W 103–88 | Ray Allen (29) | | | CoreStates Center | 1–0 |

November: 8–6 (home: 5–2; road: 3–4)

| Game | Date | Team | Score | High points | High rebounds | High assists | Location Attendance | Record |
|---|---|---|---|---|---|---|---|---|
| 2 | November 1, 1997 | New Jersey | L 109–113 | | | | Bradley Center; 18,717 | 1–1 |
| 3 | November 4, 1997 | Orlando | W 110–76 | Ray Allen (20) | | | Bradley Center; 12,764 | 2–1 |
| 4 | November 6, 1997 | Philadelphia | W 100–93 | | | | Bradley Center; 13,851 | 3–1 |
| 5 | November 8, 1997 | Boston | W 105–96 | | | | Bradley Center; 17,653 | 4–1 |
| 6 | November 12, 1997 | @ Phoenix | L 95–103 | | | | America West Arena; 19,023 | 4–2 |
| 7 | November 13, 1997 | @ L. A. Clippers | W 102–94 | | | | Los Angeles Memorial Sports Arena; 4,300 | 5–2 |
| 8 | November 15, 1997 | @ Vancouver | L 94–109 | | | | General Motors Place; 17,666 | 5–3 |
| 9 | November 16, 1997 | @ Seattle | L 99–119 | | | | Key Arena; 17,072 | 5–4 |
| 10 | November 18, 1997 | Detroit | W 87–79 | | | | Bradley Center; 13,065 | 6–4 |
| 11 | November 20, 1997 | Indiana | L 83–109 | | | | Bradley Center; 14,106 | 6–5 |
| 12 | November 22, 1997 | @ Dallas | W 104–109 | | | | Reunion Arena; 11,425 | 7–5 |
| 13 | November 26, 1997 | Vancouver | W 101–82 | | | | Bradley Center; 15,126 | 8–5 |
| 14 | November 28, 1997 | @ Orlando | L 95–103 | | | | Orlando Arena; 17,070 | 8–6 |
| 15 | November 29, 1997 | @ Miami | W 93–87 | | | | Miami Arena; 14,897 | 9–6 |

December: 5–9 (home: 5–4; road: 0–5)

| Game | Date | Team | Score | High points | High rebounds | High assists | Location Attendance | Record |
|---|---|---|---|---|---|---|---|---|
| 16 | December 2, 1997 | Phoenix | L 86–90 | | | | Bradley Center; 13,131 | 9–7 |
| 17 | December 4, 1997 | Charlotte | W 102–92 | | | | Bradley Center; 13,898 | 10–7 |
| 18 | December 5, 1997 | @ Chicago | L 62–84 | | | | United Center; 24,041 | 10–8 |
| 19 | December 7, 1997 | Seattle | W 97–91 | | | | Bradley Center; 15,806 | 11–8 |
| 20 | December 10, 1997 | @ Boston | L 91–96 | | | | Fleet Center; 17,012 | 11–9 |
| 21 | December 11, 1997 | Cleveland | L 77–79 | | | | Bradley Center; 13,105 | 11–10 |
| 22 | December 13, 1997 | Miami | L 87–87 | | | | Bradley Center; 15,803 | 11–11 |
| 23 | December 17, 1997 | @ Charlotte | L 90–99 | | | | Charlotte Coliseum; 20,691 | 11–12 |
| 24 | December 19, 1997 | @ Toronto | L 91–92 | | | | SkyDome; 15,076 | 11–13 |
| 25 | December 20, 1997 | New York | W 98–78 | | | | Bradley Center; 15,955 | 12–13 |
| 26 | December 22, 1997 | Washington | L 79–110 | | | | Bradley Center; 14,442 | 12–14 |
| 27 | December 26, 1997 | Atlanta | W 99–94 | | | | Bradley Center; 17,038 | 13–14 |
| 28 | December 27, 1997 | @ New Jersey | L 104–112 | | | | Meadowlands Arena; 16,351 | 13–15 |
| 29 | December 30, 1997 | Dallas | W 105–98 | | | | Bradley Center; 14,948 | 14–15 |

January: 1–3 (home: 0–1; road: 1–2)

| Game | Date | Team | Score | High points | High rebounds | High assists | Location Attendance | Record |
|---|---|---|---|---|---|---|---|---|
| 30 | January 2, 1998 | @ Chicago | L 100–114 | | | | United Center; 23,897 | 14–16 |
| 31 | January 3, 1998 | Boston | L 99–106 | | | | Bradley Center; 16,211 | 14–17 |
| 32 | January 5, 1998 | @ Portland | W 98–92 | | | | Rose Garden Arena; 19,215 | 15–17 |
| 33 | January 7, 1998 | @ L. A. Lakers | L 98–92 | | | | Great Western Forum; 15,483 | 15–18 |

February: 0–0 (home: 0–0; road: 0–0)

| Game | Date | Team | Score | High points | High rebounds | High assists | Location Attendance | Record |

March: 0–0 (home: 0–0; road: 0–0)

| Game | Date | Team | Score | High points | High rebounds | High assists | Location Attendance | Record |

April: 0–0 (home: 0–0; road: 0–0)

| Game | Date | Team | Score | High points | High rebounds | High assists | Location Attendance | Record |

1997–98 schedule

== Player statistics ==
Legend
| GP | Games played | GS | Games started | MPG | Minutes per game |
| FG% | Field-goal percentage | 3P% | 3-point field-goal percentage | FT% | Free-throw percentage |
| RPG | Rebounds per game | APG | Assists per game | SPG | Steals per game |
| BPG | Blocks per game | PPG | Points per game |

| Player | GP | GS | MPG | FG% | 3FG% | FT% | RPG | APG | SPG | BPG | PPG |
|---|---|---|---|---|---|---|---|---|---|---|---|
| Glenn Robinson | 56 | 56 | 41.0 | 47.0 | 38.5 | 80.8 | 5.5 | 2.8 | 1.2 | 0.6 | 23.4 |
| Ray Allen | 82 | 82 | 40.1 | 42.8 | 36.4 | 87.5 | 4.9 | 4.3 | 1.4 | 0.1 | 19.5 |
| Terrell Brandon | 50 | 48 | 35.7 | 46.4 | 33.3 | 84.6 | 3.5 | 7.7 | 2.2 | 0.3 | 16.8 |
| Armen Gilliam | 82 | 25 | 25.8 | 48.4 | 0.0 | 80.2 | 5.4 | 1.3 | 0.8 | 0.5 | 11.2 |
| Tyrone Hill | 57 | 56 | 36.2 | 49.8 | 0.0 | 60.8 | 10.7 | 1.5 | 1.2 | 0.5 | 10.0 |
| Ervin Johnson | 81 | 81 | 27.9 | 53.7 | 0.0 | 60.1 | 8.5 | 0.7 | 1.0 | 2.0 | 8.0 |
| Elliot Perry | 81 | 33 | 21.6 | 43.0 | 34.0 | 84.4 | 1.3 | 2.8 | 1.1 | 0.0 | 7.3 |
| Michael Curry | 82 | 27 | 24.1 | 46.9 | 44.4 | 83.5 | 1.2 | 1.7 | 0.7 | 0.2 | 6.6 |
| Jerald Honeycutt | 38 | 0 | 13.9 | 40.7 | 37.7 | 62.1 | 2.4 | 0.9 | 0.5 | 0.2 | 6.4 |
| Ricky Pierce | 39 | 0 | 11.3 | 36.4 | 30.8 | 82.7 | 1.2 | 0.9 | 0.2 | 0.0 | 3.9 |
| Andrew Lang | 57 | 0 | 12.1 | 37.8 | 0.0 | 77.2 | 2.7 | 0.3 | 0.3 | 0.5 | 2.7 |
| Tony Smith | 7 | 0 | 11.4 | 33.3 | 0.0 | 75.0 | 1.0 | 1.4 | 0.7 | 0.3 | 2.7 |
| Jamie Feick | 45 | 2 | 10.0 | 43.3 | 30.8 | 48.8 | 2.8 | 0.4 | 0.6 | 0.4 | 2.3 |
| Tim Breaux | 6 | 0 | 5.0 | 36.4 | 33.3 | 50.0 | 0.3 | 0.3 | 0.3 | 0.2 | 1.7 |
| Jeff Nordgaard | 13 | 0 | 3.7 | 27.8 | 0.0 | 88.9 | 1.1 | 0.2 | 0.2 | 0.0 | 1.4 |
| Litterial Green | 21 | 0 | 5.9 | 21.7 | 0.0 | 75.0 | 0.3 | 0.8 | 0.2 | 0.0 | 1.2 |

Player statistics citation:

== Transactions ==
=== Trades ===
June 25, 1997
September 25, 1997
To Milwaukee Bucks----
- Ervin Johnson
To Milwaukee Bucks

Terrell Brandon
Tyrone Hill
To Denver Nuggets----
- Danny Fortson
- Johnny Newman
- Joe Wolf
To Cleveland Cavaliers

Sherman Douglas
Shawn Kemp

To Seattle SuperSonics

Vin Baker

=== Free agents ===
| Player | Signed | Former team |
| Michael Curry | July 30, 1997 | Detroit Pistons |
| Tim Breaux | August 6, 1997 | Rockford Lightning |
| Jamie Feick | October 2, 1997 | San Antonio Spurs |
| Ricky Pierce | December 4, 1997 | Charlotte Hornets |

Player transactions citation:

== See also ==
- 1997-98 NBA season
