= 1994–95 New Jersey Nets season =

NBA professional basketball team season

- Head coach: Butch Beard
- General manager: Willis Reed
- Arena: Brendan Byrne Arena

Results
- Record: 30–52 (.366)
- Place: Division: 5th (Atlantic); Conference: 11th (Eastern)
- Playoff finish: Did not qualify
- Stats at Basketball Reference

Local media
- Television: WWOR-TV; SportsChannel New York
- Radio: WQEW

The 1994–95 New Jersey Nets season was the Nets' 28th season in the National Basketball Association, and 19th season in East Rutherford, New Jersey.

== Season summary ==
=== Off-season ===
The Nets had the 14th overall pick in the 1994 NBA draft, and selected Nigerian center Yinka Dare out of George Washington University. During the off-season, the team re-signed free agent Sleepy Floyd, signed Sean Higgins, and undrafted rookie point guard Chris Childs, and hired Butch Beard as their new head coach.

=== Regular season ===
Under Beard, the Nets lost five of their first six games of the regular season, but then won five of their next seven games, leading to a 6–7 start to the season. However, after holding a 12–15 record as of December 21, 1994, the team struggled losing eight of their next nine games, and played below .500 in winning percentage for the entire season, holding a 19–31 record at the All-Star break. The team dealt with injuries as Derrick Coleman missed 26 games due to assorted aches and pains, and a wrist injury, while Kevin Edwards only played just 14 games before sitting out the remainder of the season due to a partly torn Achilles tendon, Benoit Benjamin missed 21 games due to a lower back injury, and Dare only played just one game due to knee injuries. Both Coleman and Kenny Anderson had a public feud with Beard, as the Nets lost 15 of their final 19 games of the season, and finished in fifth place in the Atlantic Division with a disappointing 30–52 record, missing the NBA playoffs.

Coleman averaged 20.5 points, 10.6 rebounds and 1.7 blocks per game, while Anderson averaged 17.6 points, 9.4 assists and 1.4 steals per game, and Armen Gilliam provided the team with 14.8 points and 7.5 rebounds per game, and finished in ninth place in Sixth Man of the Year voting. In addition, Edwards contributed 14.0 points and 1.4 steals per game, while Chris Morris provided with 13.4 points and 5.7 rebounds per game, and led the Nets with 106 three-point field goals, Benjamin averaged 11.1 points and 7.2 rebounds per game, and second-year forward P.J. Brown contributed 8.1 points, 6.1 rebounds and 1.7 blocks per game. Off the bench, second-year guard Rex Walters contributed 6.5 points per game, while Childs provided with 5.8 points and 4.1 assists per game, Jayson Williams averaged 4.8 points and 5.7 rebounds per game, and Floyd contributed 4.1 points and 2.6 assists per game, but struggled as he shot just .335 in field-goal percentage.

The Nets finished twelfth in the NBA in home-game attendance, with an attendance of 684,102 at the Brendan Byrne Arena during the regular season.

=== Aftermath ===
Following the season, Morris signed as a free agent with the Utah Jazz, while Benjamin was left unprotected in the 1995 NBA expansion draft, where he was selected by the Vancouver Grizzlies expansion team, and Floyd retired.

== Draft picks ==
Round	Pick	Player	Position	Nationality	College
1	14	Yinka Dare	C	Nigeria	George Washington

== Roster ==
1994–95 New Jersey Nets roster
Players

Pos.	No.	Player	Height	Weight	DOB	From
G	7	Kenny Anderson	6 ft 0 in (1.83 m)	168 lb (76 kg)	1970-10-09	Georgia Tech
C	00	Benoit Benjamin (injured)	7 ft 0 in (2.13 m)	250 lb (113 kg)	1964-11-22	Creighton
F	42	P. J. Brown	6 ft 11 in (2.11 m)	225 lb (102 kg)	1969-10-14	Louisiana Tech
G	1	Chris Childs	6 ft 3 in (1.91 m)	195 lb (88 kg)	1970-11-20	Boise State
F	44	Derrick Coleman	6 ft 10 in (2.08 m)	230 lb (104 kg)	1967-06-21	Syracuse
C	11	Yinka Dare (injured)	7 ft 0 in (2.13 m)	265 lb (120 kg)	1972-10-10	George Washington
G	21	Kevin Edwards (injured)	6 ft 3 in (1.91 m)	190 lb (86 kg)	1965-10-30	DePaul
G	12	Sleepy Floyd	6 ft 3 in (1.91 m)	170 lb (77 kg)	1960-03-06	Georgetown
F	43	Armen Gilliam	6 ft 9 in (2.06 m)	230 lb (104 kg)	1964-05-28	UNLV
F	9	Sean Higgins	6 ft 9 in (2.06 m)	205 lb (93 kg)	1968-12-30	Michigan
F	4	Rick Mahorn	6 ft 10 in (2.08 m)	240 lb (109 kg)	1958-09-21	Hampton
F	34	Chris Morris	6 ft 8 in (2.03 m)	210 lb (95 kg)	1966-01-20	Auburn
C	33	Dwayne Schintzius	7 ft 1 in (2.16 m)	260 lb (118 kg)	1968-10-14	Florida
G	2	Rex Walters	6 ft 4 in (1.93 m)	190 lb (86 kg)	1970-03-12	Kansas
F	55	Jayson Williams	6 ft 9 in (2.06 m)	240 lb (109 kg)	1968-02-22	St. John's

Coaches
Head coach
- Butch Beard
Assistant(s)
- Jerry Eaves
- Paul Silas
- John Wetzel

Legend
- (DP) Unsigned draft pick
- (FA) Free agent
- (S) Suspended
- Injured

Roster

== Regular season ==
=== Season standings ===
Atlantic Division	W	L	PCT	GB	Home	Road	Div
c-Orlando Magic	57	25	.695	—	39–2	18–23	18–10
x-New York Knicks	55	27	.671	2	29–12	26–15	23–5
x-Boston Celtics	35	47	.427	22	20–21	15–26	14–14
Miami Heat	32	50	.390	25	22–19	10–31	9–19
New Jersey Nets	30	52	.366	27	20–21	10–31	13–15
Philadelphia 76ers	24	58	.293	33	14–27	10–31	12–16
Washington Bullets	21	61	.256	36	13–28	8–33	9–19

#	Eastern Conference				
#	Team	W	L	PCT	GB
1	c-Orlando Magic	57	25	.695	–
2	y-Indiana Pacers	52	30	.634	5
3	x-New York Knicks	55	27	.671	2
4	x-Charlotte Hornets	50	32	.610	7
5	x-Chicago Bulls	47	35	.573	10
6	x-Cleveland Cavaliers	43	39	.524	14
7	x-Atlanta Hawks	42	40	.512	15
8	x-Boston Celtics	35	47	.427	22
9	Milwaukee Bucks	34	48	.415	23
10	Miami Heat	32	50	.390	25
11	New Jersey Nets	30	52	.366	27
12	Detroit Pistons	28	54	.341	29
13	Philadelphia 76ers	24	58	.293	33
14	Washington Bullets	21	61	.256	36

z – clinched division title
y – clinched division title
x – clinched playoff spot

== Game log ==
=== Regular season ===
1994–95 game log
Total: 30–52 (Home: 20–21; Road: 10–31)
November: 6–9 (home: 4–2; road: 2–7)

Game	Date	Team	Score	High points	High rebounds	High assists	Location Attendance	Record
1	November 4, 1994; 8:30 p.m. EST	@ Houston	L 86–90	Coleman (20)	Coleman (15)	Anderson (8)	The Summit; 16,611	0–1
6	November 12, 1994; 7:30 p.m. EST	Houston	L 84–100	Anderson (26)	Coleman (14)	Anderson (8)	Brendan Byrne Arena; 20,049	1–5

December: 6–10 (home: 4–5; road: 2–5)

Game	Date	Team	Score	High points	High rebounds	High assists	Location Attendance	Record

January: 5–10 (home: 2–2; road: 3–8)

Game	Date	Team	Score	High points	High rebounds	High assists	Location Attendance	Record

February: 5–6 (home: 5–3; road: 0–3)

Game	Date	Team	Score	High points	High rebounds	High assists	Location Attendance	Record
All-Star Break

March: 5–9 (home: 2–5; road: 3–4)

Game	Date	Team	Score	High points	High rebounds	High assists	Location Attendance	Record

April: 3–8 (home: 3–4; road: 0–4)

Game	Date	Team	Score	High points	High rebounds	High assists	Location Attendance	Record

1994–95 schedule

== Player statistics ==
Legend
GP	Games played	GS	Games started	MPG	Minutes per game
FG%	Field-goal percentage	3P%	3-point field-goal percentage	FT%	Free-throw percentage
RPG	Rebounds per game	APG	Assists per game	SPG	Steals per game
BPG	Blocks per game	PPG	Points per game

=== Season ===
Player	GP	GS	MPG	FG%	3P%	FT%	RPG	APG	SPG	BPG	PPG
Derrick Coleman	56	54	37.6	.424	.233	.767	10.6	3.3	0.6	1.7	20.5
Kenny Anderson	72	70	37.3	.399	.330	.841	3.5	9.4	1.4	0.2	17.6
Armen Gilliam	82	30	30.1	.503	.000	.770	7.5	1.2	0.8	1.1	14.8
Kevin Edwards	14	14	33.3	.448	.400	.952	2.6	1.9	1.4	0.4	14.0
Chris Morris	71	49	30.0	.410	.334	.728	5.7	2.1	1.2	0.7	13.4
Benoit Benjamin	61	57	26.2	.510		.760	7.2	0.6	0.4	1.0	11.1
P.J. Brown	80	63	30.8	.446	.167	.671	6.1	1.7	0.9	1.7	8.1
Rex Walters	80	30	17.9	.439	.362	.769	1.2	1.5	0.5	0.2	6.5
Chris Childs	53	11	19.3	.380	.328	.753	1.3	4.1	0.8	0.1	5.8
Jayson Williams	75	6	13.1	.461	.000	.533	5.7	0.5	0.3	0.4	4.8
Sean Higgins	57	7	12.9	.385	.295	.875	1.4	0.5	0.2	0.2	4.7
Sleepy Floyd	48	1	17.3	.335	.284	.698	1.1	2.6	0.3	0.1	4.1
Rick Mahorn	58	7	10.9	.523	.333	.796	2.8	0.4	0.2	0.2	3.4
Dwayne Schintzius	43	11	7.4	.380		.545	1.9	0.3	0.1	0.4	2.0
Yinka Dare	1	0	3.0	.000			1.0	0.0	0.0	0.0	0.0

Player statistics citation:

== See also ==
- 1994–95 NBA season
