= Chris Gatling =

American basketball player (born 1967)

Personal information
- Born: September 3, 1967 (age 59) Elizabeth, New Jersey, U.S.
- Listed height: 6 ft 10 in (2.08 m)
- Listed weight: 220 lb (100 kg)

Career information
- High school: Elizabeth (Elizabeth, New Jersey)
- College: Old Dominion (1988–1991)
- NBA draft: 1991: 1st round, 16th overall pick
- Drafted by: Golden State Warriors
- Playing career: 1991–2003
- Position: Power forward / center
- Number: 25, 15, 32

Career history
- 1991–1996: Golden State Warriors
- 1996: Miami Heat
- 1996–1997: Dallas Mavericks
- 1997–1999: New Jersey Nets
- 1999: Milwaukee Bucks
- 1999–2000: Orlando Magic
- 2000: Denver Nuggets
- 2000–2001: Cleveland Cavaliers
- 2001–2002: Miami Heat
- 2002: CSKA Moscow
- 2003: Scavolini Pesaro

Career highlights
- NBA All-Star (1997); 2× Sun Belt Player of the Year (1990, 1991); 3× First-team All-Sun Belt (1989–1991)

Career NBA statistics
- Points: 7,232 (10.3 ppg)
- Rebounds: 3,741 (5.3 rpg)
- Assists: 461 (0.7 apg)
- Stats at NBA.com
- Stats at Basketball Reference
Medals
Men's basketball
Representing United States
FIBA World Championship
| Bronze medal – third place | 1990 Buenos Aires | National team |
Goodwill Games
| Silver medal – second place | 1990 Seattle | National team |

Chris Raymond Gatling (born September 3, 1967) is an American former professional basketball player. Gatling played for many National Basketball Association (NBA) teams from 1991 to 2002. He played for the US national team in the 1990 FIBA World Championship, winning the bronze medal.

== College career ==
Gatling played three years at Old Dominion University after transferring there from the University of Pittsburgh. He is ODU's sixth all-time scorer with 1,811 points. He also hauled down 859 career rebounds, which ranks him ninth all-time. Gatling is the school's all-time field goal percentage leader at .606 (697–1150), and is second all-time at ODU with (12) 30-point games. He shot .620 (251–405) from the field in 1991.

Gatling scored 36 points in a game against UNC Charlotte in 1991 and against Alabama-Birmingham in March 1989. He earned honorable mention All-American honors in 1990 and 1991. Gatling was named sophomore of the year in 1988, and then Sun Belt Conference Player of the Year in both 1990 and 1991. In 1991, he was named the Sun Belt Conference tournament Most Valuable Player as he led the then seventh seeded Monarchs to the finals before losing to South Alabama.

== Professional career ==
Gatling was drafted 16th overall by the Golden State Warriors in the 1991 NBA draft. He spent the first four years of his career with the Warriors, and averaged 13.7 points and 7.6 rebounds per game in his final full season with the Warriors, 1994–95. That same year, Gatling led the NBA in field goal percentage at 0.633-one of the ten highest percentages in NBA history. Gatling was traded, along with Tim Hardaway, to the Miami Heat halfway through the 1995–96 season, and also played for the Dallas Mavericks and New Jersey Nets during the 1996–97 season (representing the Mavericks in the 1997 NBA All-Star Game a few days before being traded to the Nets).

Gatling played 78 games in slightly more than two seasons with the Nets before requesting a trade. He played next with the Milwaukee Bucks for the final thirty games of the lockout-shortened 1998–99 season. He split the 1999–2000 season with the Denver Nuggets and the Orlando Magic. His final two NBA seasons saw him with the Cleveland Cavaliers and again, the Heat. Gatling retired from the NBA following the 2001–02 season with career averages of 10.3 points and 5.3 rebounds per game, and a .513 field goal percentage. After his NBA career ended in 2002, he played one season in Russian League with CSKA Moscow.

== Personal life ==
Gatling attended Elizabeth High School in Elizabeth, New Jersey. During his NBA career, Gatling was known for wearing a headband during games. Gatling stated that he started the practice after he fell out of a truck as a teenager, causing a serious head injury. The headband served as a reminder that he was lucky to be alive. In December 2017, Gatling was sentenced in Maricopa County, Arizona to two and a half years in prison for fraud.

== NBA career statistics ==
Legend
| GP | Games played | GS | Games started | MPG | Minutes per game |
| FG% | Field goal percentage | 3P% | 3-point field goal percentage | FT% | Free throw percentage |
| RPG | Rebounds per game | APG | Assists per game | SPG | Steals per game |
| BPG | Blocks per game | PPG | Points per game | **Bold** | Career high |
| * | Led the league |

=== Regular season ===
| Year | Team | GP | GS | MPG | FG% | 3P% | FT% | RPG | APG | SPG | BPG | PPG |
|---|---|---|---|---|---|---|---|---|---|---|---|---|
| 1991–92 | Golden State | 54 | 1 | 11.3 | .568 | .000 | .661 | 3.4 | .3 | .6 | .7 | 5.7 |
| 1992–93 | Golden State | 70 | 11 | 17.8 | .539 | .000 | .725 | 4.6 | .6 | .6 | .8 | 9.3 |
| 1993–94 | Golden State | 82 | **23** | 15.8 | .588 | .000 | .620 | 4.8 | .5 | .5 | .8 | 8.2 |
| 1994–95 | Golden State | 58 | 22 | 25.3 | **.633*** | .000 | .592 | 7.6 | .9 | .7 | **.9** | 13.7 |
| 1995–96 | Golden State | 47 | 2 | 18.3 | .555 | .000 | .636 | 5.1 | .6 | .4 | .6 | 9.1 |
| 1995–96 | Miami | 24 | 0 | 23.5 | .598 | .000 | .733 | 7.3 | .7 | .7 | .5 | 15.2 |
| 1996–97 | Dallas | 44 | 1 | 27.1 | .533 | .167 | .706 | **7.9** | .6 | .8 | .7 | **19.1** |
| 1996–97 | New Jersey | 3 | 0 | **30.7** | .419 | .000 | **.938** | 7.3 | **1.0** | **1.3** | .0 | 17.0 |
| 1997–98 | New Jersey | 57 | 16 | 23.8 | .455 | .250 | .600 | 5.9 | .9 | .9 | .5 | 11.5 |
| 1998–99 | New Jersey | 18 | 2 | 15.6 | .371 | .000 | .500 | 3.6 | .7 | .4 | .2 | 4.7 |
| 1998–99 | Milwaukee | 30 | 1 | 16.5 | .482 | .143 | .362 | 3.8 | .7 | .8 | .2 | 6.3 |
| 1999–00 | Orlando | **45*** | 0 | 23.1 | .455 | **.304** | .698 | 6.6 | .9 | 1.1 | .2 | 13.3 |
| 1999–00 | Denver | **40*** | 0 | 19.3 | .456 | .234 | .742 | 5.1 | .8 | .8 | .3 | 10.4 |
| 2000–01 | Cleveland | 74 | 6 | 22.6 | .449 | **.304** | .684 | 5.3 | .8 | .7 | .4 | 11.4 |
| 2001–02 | Miami | 54 | 1 | 15.0 | .447 | .125 | .701 | 3.8 | .5 | .3 | .2 | 6.4 |
| Career | | 700 | 86 | 19.7 | .513 | .249 | .660 | 5.3 | .7 | .7 | .5 | 10.3 |
| All-Star | | 1 | 0 | 12.0 | .125 | .000 | .000 | 2.0 | .0 | 1.0 | .0 | 2.0 |

=== Playoffs ===
| Year | Team | GP | GS | MPG | FG% | 3P% | FT% | RPG | APG | SPG | BPG | PPG |
|---|---|---|---|---|---|---|---|---|---|---|---|---|
| 1992 | Golden State | **4** | 0 | 20.3 | **.621** | .000 | .636 | 6.3 | .0 | .5 | **2.5** | 12.5 |
| 1994 | Golden State | 3 | **1** | 18.0 | .615 | .000 | **.769** | 5.7 | **1.3** | **.7** | .3 | 8.7 |
| 1996 | Miami | 3 | 0 | 22.7 | .273 | .000 | .500 | **8.0** | 0.3 | **.7** | .0 | 6.0 |
| 1998 | New Jersey | 3 | **1** | **27.0** | .500 | .000 | .667 | 3.3 | .7 | **.7** | .7 | **15.3** |
| 1999 | Milwaukee | 2 | 0 | 6.0 | .000 | .000 | .000 | 1.5 | .0 | .5 | .0 | .0 |
| Career | | 15 | 2 | 19.7 | .490 | .000 | .623 | 5.3 | .5 | .6 | .9 | 9.3 |
