= 1997–98 Charlotte Hornets season =

NBA professional basketball team season

- Head coach: Dave Cowens
- General manager: Bob Bass
- Owner: George Shinn
- Arena: Charlotte Coliseum

Results
- Record: 51–31 (.622)
- Place: Division: 3rd (Central); Conference: 4th (Eastern)
- Playoff finish: Conference semifinals (lost to Bulls 1–4)
- Stats at Basketball Reference

Local media
- Television: Fox Sports South; WJZY; WFVT
- Radio: WBT

The 1997–98 Charlotte Hornets season was the tenth season for the Charlotte Hornets in the National Basketball Association.

== Season summary ==
=== Off-season ===
During the off-season, the Hornets signed free agents David Wesley, and Bobby Phills, and re-signed former Hornets forward J.R. Reid.

For the season, the Hornets slightly redesigned their home and road uniforms, which featured a teal, purple and blue trim, side panels and additional pinstripes to their jerseys and shorts. The white home uniforms featured teal side panels with blue inlines, while the teal road uniforms featured purple side panels with blue and white inlines; both uniforms featured the team's primary logo on the leg left of their shorts. The team's new uniforms would remain in use until 2002.

=== Regular season ===
Early into the regular season, the Hornets traded long-time guard Muggsy Bogues, and second-year guard Tony Delk to the Golden State Warriors in exchange for B. J. Armstrong, who won three NBA championships with the Chicago Bulls in the early 1990s.

With the addition of Wesley and Phills, the Hornets won nine of their first twelve games of the regular season, and later on held a 29–18 record at the All-Star break. At mid-season, the team signed free agent Vernon Maxwell, who was previously released by the Orlando Magic. Despite injuries to Phills, Vlade Divac and long-time original Hornets guard Dell Curry, the Hornets had another stellar season by posting a 10-game winning streak between February and March, winning 15 of 16 games between February 21 and March 26, 1998. The Hornets finished in third place in the Central Division with a 51–31 record, earned the fourth seed in the Eastern Conference, and qualified for their fourth NBA playoff appearance.

Glen Rice averaged 22.3 points per game, led the Hornets with 130 three-point field goals, and was named to the All-NBA Third Team, while Wesley averaged 13.0 points, 6.5 assists and 1.7 steals per game, and Anthony Mason provided the team with 12.8 points, 10.2 rebounds and 4.2 assists per game. In addition, Matt Geiger provided with 11.3 points and 6.7 rebounds per game, while Phills contributed 10.4 points per game in 62 games, and Divac averaged 10.4 points, 8.1 rebounds and 1.5 blocks per game in 64 games. Off the bench, Curry contributed 9.4 points per game in only 52 games, while Maxwell contributed 6.8 points per game in 31 games, Reid averaged 4.9 points and 2.7 rebounds per game, and Armstrong provided with 3.9 points and 2.3 assists per game.

During the NBA All-Star weekend at Madison Square Garden in New York City, New York, Rice was selected for the 1998 NBA All-Star Game, as a member of the Eastern Conference All-Star team; it was his third and final All-Star appearance. Off the bench, Rice scored 16 points and made 4 out of 6 three-point field-goal attempts, as the Eastern Conference defeated the Western Conference, 135–114. In addition, Rice participated in the NBA Three-Point Shootout for the fourth consecutive year, and also participated in the inaugural NBA 2Ball Competition, along with Andrea Stinson of the WNBA's Charlotte Sting. Rice also finished in eleventh place in Most Valuable Player voting, while Mason finished tied in ninth place in Defensive Player of the Year voting, and Geiger finished tied in 13th place in Most Improved Player voting.

The Hornets finished second in the NBA in home-game attendance behind the Chicago Bulls, with an attendance of 959,634 at the Charlotte Coliseum during the regular season. On November 25, 1997, the team's sellout streak ended at 364 consecutive games (371 including post-season contests); this was the second longest active sell-out streak at the time, behind the Bulls' 465.

=== NBA playoffs ===
In the Eastern Conference First Round of the 1998 NBA playoffs, the Hornets faced off against the 5th–seeded Atlanta Hawks, a team that featured All-Star center, and Defensive Player of the Year, Dikembe Mutombo, All-Star guard Steve Smith, and Mookie Blaylock; Smith was Rice's former teammate on the Miami Heat. The Hornets won the first two games over the Hawks at home at the Charlotte Coliseum, before losing Game 3 on the road by a 32-point margin, 96–64 at the Georgia Dome. The Hornets won Game 4 over the Hawks on the road, 91–82 to win the series in four games.

In the Eastern Conference Semi-finals, the team faced off against the top–seeded, and 2-time defending NBA champion Bulls, who won the Central Division title, and were led by the trio of All-Star guard, and Most Valuable Player of the Year, Michael Jordan, All-Star forward Scottie Pippen, and rebound-specialist Dennis Rodman. The Hornets lost Game 1 to the Bulls on the road, 83–70 at the United Center, but managed to win Game 2 on the road, 78–76 to even the series. However, the Hornets lost their next two home games at the Charlotte Coliseum, before losing Game 5 to the Bulls at the United Center, 93–84, thus losing the series in five games.

The Bulls would go on to reach the 1998 NBA Finals, where they defeated the Utah Jazz in six games to win their third consecutive NBA championship, and sixth overall in eight years.

=== Aftermath ===
Following the season, Divac and Maxwell both signed as free agents with the Sacramento Kings, while Curry signed with the Milwaukee Bucks after ten seasons with the Hornets, and Geiger signed with the Philadelphia 76ers. As of 2026, this was the final season in which the franchise won 50 or more games during the regular season.

== Offseason ==
=== NBA draft ===
The Hornets had no draft picks in 1997.

== Roster ==
1997–98 Charlotte Hornets roster
Players

| Pos. | No. | Player | Height | Weight | DOB | From |
|---|---|---|---|---|---|---|
| G | 10 | B. J. Armstrong | 6 ft 2 in (1.88 m) | 175 lb (79 kg) | 1967–09–09 | Iowa |
| G | 15 | Corey Beck | 6 ft 1 in (1.85 m) | 190 lb (86 kg) | 1971–05–27 | Arkansas |
| G | 30 | Dell Curry | 6 ft 4 in (1.93 m) | 190 lb (86 kg) | 1964–06–25 | Virginia Tech |
| C | 12 | Vlade Divac | 7 ft 1 in (2.16 m) | 243 lb (110 kg) | 1968–02–03 | Yugoslavia |
| C | 52 | Matt Geiger | 7 ft 0 in (2.13 m) | 243 lb (110 kg) | 1969–09–10 | Georgia Tech |
| F | 14 | Anthony Mason | 6 ft 7 in (2.01 m) | 250 lb (113 kg) | 1966–12–14 | Tennessee State |
| G | 11 | Vernon Maxwell | 6 ft 4 in (1.93 m) | 180 lb (82 kg) | 1965–09–12 | Florida |
| C | 42 | Michael McDonald | 6 ft 10 in (2.08 m) | 232 lb (105 kg) | 1969–02–13 | LSU New Orleans |
| G | 13 | Bobby Phills | 6 ft 5 in (1.96 m) | 210 lb (95 kg) | 1969–12–20 | Southern |
| F | 7 | J.R. Reid | 6 ft 9 in (2.06 m) | 247 lb (112 kg) | 1968–03–31 | North Carolina |
| F | 41 | Glen Rice | 6 ft 7 in (2.01 m) | 215 lb (98 kg) | 1967–05–28 | Michigan |
| F | 5 | Donald Royal | 6 ft 8 in (2.03 m) | 210 lb (95 kg) | 1966–05–22 | Notre Dame |
| G | 4 | David Wesley | 6 ft 0 in (1.83 m) | 190 lb (86 kg) | 1970–11–14 | Baylor |
| F | 32 | Travis Williams | 6 ft 6 in (1.98 m) | 215 lb (98 kg) | 1969–05–27 | South Carolina State |

Coaches
Head coach
- Dave Cowens
Assistant(s)
- Mark Osowski
- Lee Rose
- Paul Silas

Legend
- (DP) Unsigned draft pick
- (FA) Free agent
- (S) Suspended
- Injured

Roster
Updated: March 24, 1998

== Regular season ==
=== Season standings ===
| Central Division | W | L | PCT | GB | Home | Road | Div |
|---|---|---|---|---|---|---|---|
| y-Chicago Bulls | 62 | 20 | .756 | – | 37–4 | 25–16 | 21–7 |
| x-Indiana Pacers | 58 | 24 | .707 | 4 | 32–9 | 26–15 | 19–9 |
| x-Charlotte Hornets | 51 | 31 | .622 | 11 | 32–9 | 19–22 | 16–12 |
| x-Atlanta Hawks | 50 | 32 | .610 | 12 | 29–12 | 21–20 | 19–9 |
| x-Cleveland Cavaliers | 47 | 35 | .573 | 15 | 27–14 | 20–21 | 14–14 |
| Detroit Pistons | 37 | 45 | .451 | 25 | 25–16 | 12–29 | 12–16 |
| Milwaukee Bucks | 36 | 46 | .439 | 26 | 21–20 | 15–26 | 9–19 |
| Toronto Raptors | 16 | 66 | .195 | 46 | 9–32 | 7–34 | 2–26 |

| # | Eastern Conference | | | | |
| # | Team | W | L | PCT | GB |
|---|---|---|---|---|---|
| 1 | c-Chicago Bulls | 62 | 20 | .756 | – |
| 2 | y-Miami Heat | 55 | 27 | .671 | 7 |
| 3 | x-Indiana Pacers | 58 | 24 | .707 | 4 |
| 4 | x-Charlotte Hornets | 51 | 31 | .622 | 11 |
| 5 | x-Atlanta Hawks | 50 | 32 | .610 | 12 |
| 6 | x-Cleveland Cavaliers | 47 | 35 | .573 | 15 |
| 7 | x-New York Knicks | 43 | 39 | .524 | 19 |
| 8 | x-New Jersey Nets | 43 | 39 | .524 | 19 |
| 9 | Washington Wizards | 42 | 40 | .512 | 20 |
| 10 | Orlando Magic | 41 | 41 | .500 | 21 |
| 11 | Detroit Pistons | 37 | 45 | .451 | 25 |
| 12 | Boston Celtics | 36 | 46 | .439 | 26 |
| 13 | Milwaukee Bucks | 36 | 46 | .439 | 26 |
| 14 | Philadelphia 76ers | 31 | 51 | .378 | 31 |
| 15 | Toronto Raptors | 16 | 66 | .195 | 46 |

== Playoffs ==
1998 playoff game log
Total: 4–5 (home: 2–2; road: 2–3)
First Round: 3–1 (home: 2–0; road: 1–1)

| Game | Date | Team | Score | High points | High rebounds | High assists | Location Attendance | Series |
|---|---|---|---|---|---|---|---|---|
| 1 | April 23 | Atlanta | W 97–87 | Glen Rice (34) | Divac, Mason (7) | David Wesley (12) | Charlotte Coliseum; 19,176 | 1–0 |
| 2 | April 25 | Atlanta | W 92–85 | Anthony Mason (25) | Glen Rice (13) | Divac, Wesley (6) | Charlotte Coliseum; 20,390 | 2–0 |
| 3 | April 28 | @ Atlanta | L 64–96 | Anthony Mason (12) | Vlade Divac (7) | Divac, Wesley (5) | Georgia Dome; 19,745 | 2–1 |
| 4 | May 1 | @ Atlanta | W 91–82 | Anthony Mason (29) | Anthony Mason (14) | David Wesley (10) | Georgia Dome; 22,074 | 3–1 |

Conference semifinals: 1–4 (home: 0–2; road: 1–2)

| Game | Date | Team | Score | High points | High rebounds | High assists | Location Attendance | Series |
|---|---|---|---|---|---|---|---|---|
| 1 | May 3 | @ Chicago | L 70–83 | Glen Rice (25) | Vlade Divac (14) | David Wesley (9) | United Center; 23,844 | 0–1 |
| 2 | May 6 | @ Chicago | W 78–76 | Mason, Curry (15) | Vlade Divac (19) | Mason, Rice (4) | United Center; 23,844 | 1–1 |
| 3 | May 8 | Chicago | L 89–103 | Glen Rice (31) | Vlade Divac (13) | David Wesley (8) | Charlotte Coliseum; 23,799 | 1–2 |
| 4 | May 10 | Chicago | L 80–94 | Vlade Divac (15) | Glen Rice (9) | Anthony Mason (5) | Charlotte Coliseum; 23,799 | 1–3 |
| 5 | May 13 | @ Chicago | L 84–93 | Glen Rice (30) | Vlade Divac (15) | three players tied (5) | United Center; 23,844 | 1–4 |

1998 schedule

== Player statistics ==
=== Regular season ===
| Player | POS | GP | GS | MP | REB | AST | STL | BLK | PTS | MPG | RPG | APG | SPG | BPG | PPG |
|---|---|---|---|---|---|---|---|---|---|---|---|---|---|---|---|
| Glen Rice | SF | 82 | 82 | 3,295 | 353 | 182 | 77 | 22 | 1,826 | 40.2 | 4.3 | 2.2 | .9 | .3 | 22.3 |
| David Wesley | PG | 81 | 81 | 2,845 | 213 | 529 | 140 | 30 | 1,054 | 35.1 | 2.6 | 6.5 | 1.7 | .4 | 13.0 |
| Anthony Mason | PF | 81 | 80 | 3,148 | 826 | 342 | 68 | 18 | 1,039 | 38.9 | 10.2 | 4.2 | .8 | .2 | 12.8 |
| J. R. Reid | PF | 79 | 1 | 1,109 | 210 | 51 | 35 | 19 | 384 | 14.0 | 2.7 | .6 | .4 | .2 | 4.9 |
| Matt Geiger | C | 78 | 42 | 1,839 | 521 | 78 | 68 | 87 | 885 | 23.6 | 6.7 | 1.0 | .9 | 1.1 | 11.3 |
| Vlade Divac | C | 64 | 41 | 1,805 | 518 | 172 | 83 | 94 | 667 | 28.2 | 8.1 | 2.7 | 1.3 | 1.5 | 10.4 |
| Bobby Phills | SG | 62 | 61 | 1,887 | 216 | 187 | 81 | 18 | 642 | 30.4 | 3.5 | 3.0 | 1.3 | .3 | 10.4 |
| B. J. Armstrong^{†} | PG | 62 | 0 | 772 | 69 | 144 | 25 | 0 | 244 | 12.5 | 1.1 | 2.3 | .4 | .0 | 3.9 |
| Corey Beck | PG | 59 | 14 | 738 | 90 | 98 | 33 | 7 | 191 | 12.5 | 1.5 | 1.7 | .6 | .1 | 3.2 |
| Dell Curry | SG | 52 | 1 | 971 | 101 | 69 | 31 | 4 | 490 | 18.7 | 1.9 | 1.3 | .6 | .1 | 9.4 |
| Travis Williams | SF | 39 | 0 | 365 | 92 | 20 | 18 | 5 | 136 | 9.4 | 2.4 | .5 | .5 | .1 | 3.5 |
| Vernon Maxwell^{†} | SG | 31 | 0 | 467 | 44 | 40 | 14 | 3 | 210 | 15.1 | 1.4 | 1.3 | .5 | .1 | 6.8 |
| Donald Royal^{†} | SF | 29 | 5 | 305 | 37 | 16 | 6 | 1 | 74 | 10.5 | 1.3 | .6 | .2 | .0 | 2.6 |
| Tony Farmer | C | 27 | 2 | 169 | 32 | 5 | 10 | 4 | 67 | 6.3 | 1.2 | .2 | .4 | .1 | 2.5 |
| Tony Delk^{†} | PG | 3 | 0 | 34 | 2 | 3 | 0 | 0 | 8 | 11.3 | .7 | 1.0 | .0 | .0 | 2.7 |
| Muggsy Bogues^{†} | PG | 2 | 0 | 16 | 1 | 4 | 2 | 0 | 6 | 8.0 | .5 | 2.0 | 1.0 | .0 | 3.0 |
| Jeff Grayer^{†} | SG | 1 | 0 | 11 | 0 | 1 | 0 | 0 | 0 | 11.0 | .0 | 1.0 | .0 | .0 | .0 |
| Michael McDonald | C | 1 | 0 | 4 | 1 | 0 | 0 | 0 | 0 | 4.0 | 1.0 | .0 | .0 | .0 | .0 |

- ^{†} Denotes player spent time with another team in the season. Stats reflect time with the Hornets only.

=== Playoffs ===
| Player | POS | GP | GS | MP | REB | AST | STL | BLK | PTS | MPG | RPG | APG | SPG | BPG | PPG |
|---|---|---|---|---|---|---|---|---|---|---|---|---|---|---|---|
| Glen Rice | SF | 9 | 9 | 369 | 51 | 13 | 5 | 3 | 205 | 41.0 | 5.7 | 1.4 | .6 | .3 | 22.8 |
| Anthony Mason | PF | 9 | 9 | 367 | 71 | 31 | 8 | 0 | 139 | 40.8 | 7.9 | 3.4 | .9 | .0 | 15.4 |
| Vlade Divac | C | 9 | 9 | 345 | 98 | 31 | 7 | 14 | 104 | 38.3 | 10.9 | 3.4 | .8 | 1.6 | 11.6 |
| David Wesley | PG | 9 | 9 | 285 | 18 | 60 | 7 | 0 | 90 | 31.7 | 2.0 | 6.7 | .8 | .0 | 10.0 |
| Bobby Phills | SG | 9 | 9 | 269 | 23 | 24 | 10 | 2 | 57 | 29.9 | 2.6 | 2.7 | 1.1 | .2 | 6.3 |
| Dell Curry | SG | 9 | 0 | 171 | 19 | 10 | 7 | 3 | 52 | 19.0 | 2.1 | 1.1 | .8 | .3 | 5.8 |
| B. J. Armstrong | PG | 9 | 0 | 146 | 10 | 18 | 6 | 0 | 37 | 16.2 | 1.1 | 2.0 | .7 | .0 | 4.1 |
| J. R. Reid | PF | 9 | 0 | 114 | 20 | 2 | 3 | 2 | 30 | 12.7 | 2.2 | .2 | .3 | .2 | 3.3 |
| Corey Beck | PG | 6 | 0 | 26 | 1 | 0 | 4 | 0 | 15 | 4.3 | .2 | .0 | .7 | .0 | 2.5 |
| Donald Royal | SF | 4 | 0 | 28 | 4 | 1 | 0 | 0 | 9 | 7.0 | 1.0 | .3 | .0 | .0 | 2.3 |
| Matt Geiger | C | 4 | 0 | 22 | 5 | 1 | 0 | 0 | 2 | 5.5 | 1.3 | .3 | .0 | .0 | .5 |
| Travis Williams | SF | 4 | 0 | 18 | 5 | 0 | 1 | 1 | 5 | 4.5 | 1.3 | .0 | .3 | .3 | 1.3 |

== Awards and records ==
- Glen Rice, All-NBA Third Team

== Transactions ==
- July 1, 1997

Released Rafael Addison.

Signed David Wesley as a free agent.

- July 16, 1997

Signed J.R. Reid as a free agent.

- August 19, 1997

Signed Bobby Phills as a free agent.

Released Malik Rose.

Waived Ricky Pierce.

- September 10, 1997

Signed Tony Farmer as a free agent.

Signed Travis Williams as a free agent.

- October 2, 1997

Signed Corey Beck as a free agent.

- November 7, 1997

Traded Muggsy Bogues and Tony Delk to the Golden State Warriors for B. J. Armstrong.

- January 16, 1998

Signed Donald Royal to the first of two 10-day contracts.

- January 22, 1998

Signed Michael McDonald as a free agent.

- February 2, 1998

Signed Jeff Grayer to a 10-day contract.

Signed Vernon Maxwell to a 10-day contract.

- February 4, 1998

Signed Donald Royal to a contract for the rest of the season.

- February 13, 1998

Signed Vernon Maxwell to a contract for the rest of the season.

- March 24, 1998

Waived Tony Farmer.

Player transactions citation:
