= 1997–98 Philadelphia 76ers season =

NBA professional basketball team season

- Head coach: Larry Brown
- General manager: Larry Brown
- Owners: Comcast Spectacor
- Arena: CoreStates Center

Results
- Record: 31–51 (.378)
- Place: Division: 7th (Atlantic); Conference: 14th (Eastern)
- Playoff finish: Did not qualify
- Stats at Basketball Reference

Local media
- Television: WPSG; CSN Philadelphia
- Radio: WIP

The 1997–98 Philadelphia 76ers season was the 49th season for the Philadelphia 76ers in the National Basketball Association, and their 35th season in Philadelphia, Pennsylvania.

== Season summary ==
=== Off-season ===
The 76ers received the second overall pick in the 1997 NBA draft, and selected power forward Keith Van Horn from the University of Utah; however, Van Horn refused to play for the 76ers, and was soon traded to the New Jersey Nets in exchange for Jim Jackson, Eric Montross, rookie small forward, and first-round draft pick Tim Thomas out of Villanova University, and rookie shooting guard, and first-round draft pick Anthony Parker out of Bradley University. The 76ers also signed free agent and former All-Star forward Terry Cummings, and hired Larry Brown as their new head coach during the off-season.

For the season, the 76ers redesigned their primary logo, replacing the color slated blue with black, bronze, silver and light blue to their color scheme of red and white. The team's primary logo featured the team name "76ers" in bronze letters with white shadows, in front of a black background and red outline; the logo also featured a silver star with a red outline behind the number 7, and with a bronze basketball with light blue stripes below the team name. The team also redesigned their home and road uniforms, which featured a red, black and bronze trim; the white home uniforms featured the team nickname "Sixers" in bronze letters on the front of their jerseys, while the road uniforms were changed from red to black, and featured the nickname in white letters.

The team's new primary logo would remain in use until 2009, while the new uniforms would be slightly redesigned in 2000.

=== Regular season ===
Under Brown and with the addition of Jackson and Thomas, the 76ers got off to a rough start losing their first five games of the regular season. In November, the team traded their second-round draft pick, Slovenian rookie small forward Marko Milič, to the Phoenix Suns in exchange for former All-Star forward Tom Chambers; however, after only just one game for the 76ers, Chambers retired in December. In late December, the team traded Montross, and Jerry Stackhouse to the Detroit Pistons in exchange for Theo Ratliff, and Aaron McKie, and then later on in January, acquired Eric Snow from the Seattle SuperSonics in exchange for a draft pick.

At mid-season, the 76ers traded Jackson, and Clarence Weatherspoon to the Golden State Warriors in exchange for Joe Smith, and Brian Shaw, while Cummings was dealt to the New York Knicks in exchange for Herb Williams, who was released by the 76ers, and re-signed with the Knicks. Before the trades, Stackhouse averaged 16.0 points and 1.4 steals per game in 22 games, while Jackson provided the team with 13.7 points and 4.6 assists per game in 48 games, and Weatherspoon contributed 8.4 points and 7.0 rebounds per game also in 48 games. With a 14–31 record at the All-Star break, the 76ers showed improvement posting a 17–20 record for the remainder of the season, and finished in last place in the Atlantic Division with a 31–51 record; however, the team missed the NBA playoffs for the seventh consecutive year.

Second-year star Allen Iverson had a stellar season averaging 22.0 points, 6.2 assists and 2.2 steals per game, while Derrick Coleman provided the team with 17.6 points and 9.9 rebounds per game, but only played 59 games due to an irregular heartbeat, and an ankle injury, and Thomas contributed 11.0 points per game, and was named to the NBA All-Rookie Second Team. In addition, for the players who were acquired via trades during the regular season, Ratliff averaged 11.2 points, 7.3 rebounds and 3.5 blocks per game in 58 games, while off the bench, Smith averaged 10.3 points and 4.4 rebounds per game in 30 games, Shaw provided with 6.1 points and 4.4 assists per game in 20 games, and Snow contributed 3.9 points, 3.5 assists and 1.3 steals per game in 47 games. McKie contributed 3.9 points and 1.4 steals per game in 57 games, but struggled as he only shot .346 in field-goal percentage.

During the NBA All-Star weekend at Madison Square Garden in New York City, New York, Thomas was selected for the NBA Rookie Game, as a member of the Eastern Conference Rookie team. Despite a stellar season, Iverson was not selected for the 1998 NBA All-Star Game. Ratliff finished in sixth place in Most Improved Player voting. The 76ers finished 20th in the NBA in home-game attendance, with an attendance of 655,417 at the CoreStates Center during the regular season.

=== Aftermath ===
Following the season, Coleman signed as a free agent with the Charlotte Hornets, while Smith signed with the Minnesota Timberwolves, and Shaw and Mark Davis were both released to free agency. The start of the rebuilding of the franchise began with the acquisitions of Ratliff, McKie and Snow; these three players blended well with coach Brown's philosophy, and this would be the last season in which the 76ers missed the playoffs until the 2003–04 season.

== Offseason ==
=== Draft picks ===
Round	Pick	Player	Position	Nationality	College
1	2	Keith Van Horn	SF/PF	United States	University of Utah
2	33	Marko Milič	SG/SF	Slovenia	
2	35	Kebu Stewart	PF	United States	California State University, Bakersfield
2	36	James Collins	SG	United States	Florida State University

== Roster ==
1997–98 Philadelphia 76ers roster
Players

Pos.	No.	Player	Height	Weight	DOB	From
C	00	Benoit Benjamin	7 ft 0 in (2.13 m)	250 lb (113 kg)	1964–11–22	Creighton
F	44	Derrick Coleman	6 ft 10 in (2.08 m)	230 lb (104 kg)	1967–06–21	Syracuse
F	7	Mark Davis	6 ft 7 in (2.01 m)	210 lb (95 kg)	1973–04–26	Texas Tech
G	3	Allen Iverson	6 ft 0 in (1.83 m)	165 lb (75 kg)	1975–06–07	Georgetown
G	8	Aaron McKie	6 ft 5 in (1.96 m)	209 lb (95 kg)	1972–10–02	Temple
G	11	Doug Overton	6 ft 3 in (1.91 m)	190 lb (86 kg)	1969–08–03	La Salle
G	12	Anthony Parker	6 ft 6 in (1.98 m)	215 lb (98 kg)	1975–06–19	Bradley
C	42	Theo Ratliff	6 ft 10 in (2.08 m)	225 lb (102 kg)	1973–04–17	Wyoming
G	22	Brian Shaw	6 ft 6 in (1.98 m)	190 lb (86 kg)	1966–03–22	UC Santa Barbara
F	9	Joe Smith	6 ft 10 in (2.08 m)	225 lb (102 kg)	1975–07–26	Maryland
G	20	Eric Snow	6 ft 3 in (1.91 m)	190 lb (86 kg)	1973–04–24	Michigan State
F	41	Kebu Stewart	6 ft 8 in (2.03 m)	239 lb (108 kg)	1973–12–19	Cal State Bakersfield
F	1	Tim Thomas	6 ft 10 in (2.08 m)	230 lb (104 kg)	1977–02–26	Villanova
C	55	Scott Williams	6 ft 10 in (2.08 m)	230 lb (104 kg)	1968–03–21	North Carolina

Coaches
Head coach
- Larry Brown
Assistant(s)
- Maurice Cheeks
- Gar Heard
- John Kuester
- Mark Turgeon

Legend
- (DP) Unsigned draft pick
- (FA) Free agent
- (S) Suspended
- Injured

Roster
Updated: March 30, 1998

== Regular season ==
=== Season standings ===
Atlantic Division	W	L	PCT	GB	Home	Road	Div
y-Miami Heat	55	27	.671	–	30-11	25–16	18–6
x-New York Knicks	43	39	.524	12	28–13	15–26	13–11
x-New Jersey Nets	43	39	.524	12	26–15	17–24	12–12
Washington Wizards	42	40	.512	13	24–17	18–23	12–13
Orlando Magic	41	41	.500	14	24–17	17–24	11–13
Boston Celtics	36	46	.439	19	24–17	12–29	12–12
Philadelphia 76ers	31	51	.378	24	19–22	12–29	7–17

#	Eastern Conference				
#	Team	W	L	PCT	GB
1	c-Chicago Bulls	62	20	.756	–
2	y-Miami Heat	55	27	.671	7
3	x-Indiana Pacers	58	24	.707	4
4	x-Charlotte Hornets	51	31	.622	11
5	x-Atlanta Hawks	50	32	.610	12
6	x-Cleveland Cavaliers	47	35	.573	15
7	x-New York Knicks	43	39	.524	19
8	x-New Jersey Nets	43	39	.524	19
9	Washington Wizards	42	40	.512	20
10	Orlando Magic	41	41	.500	21
11	Detroit Pistons	37	45	.451	25
12	Boston Celtics	36	46	.439	26
13	Milwaukee Bucks	36	46	.439	26
14	Philadelphia 76ers	31	51	.378	31
15	Toronto Raptors	16	66	.195	46

z - clinched division title
y - clinched division title
x - clinched playoff spot
° - did not make playoffs

== Player statistics ==
Legend
GP	Games played	GS	Games started	MPG	Minutes per game
FG%	Field-goal percentage	3P%	3-point field-goal percentage	FT%	Free-throw percentage
RPG	Rebounds per game	APG	Assists per game	SPG	Steals per game
BPG	Blocks per game	PPG	Points per game

=== Regular season ===
Player	GP	GS	MPG	FG%	3P%	FT%	RPG	APG	SPG	BPG	PPG
Benoit Benjamin	14	0	14.1	.537		.633	3.8	.2	.3	.3	4.5
Tom Chambers	1	0	10.0	1.000		1.000	2.0	.0	2.0	.0	6.0
Derrick Coleman	59	58	36.2	.411	.265	.772	9.9	2.5	.8	1.2	17.6
Terry Cummings^{†}	44	2	14.9	.458	.000	.672	3.4	.5	.5	.1	5.3
William Cunningham^{†}	1	0	1.0				2.0	.0	.0	.0	.0
Mark Davis	71	12	12.8	.447	.000	.634	2.2	1.0	.7	.3	4.0
Allen Iverson	80	80	39.4	.461	.298	.729	3.7	6.2	2.2	.3	22.0
Jim Jackson^{†}	48	47	37.3	.460	.348	.818	4.7	4.6	.9	.1	13.7
Aaron McKie^{†}	57	31	23.5	.347	.196	.688	2.9	2.4	1.4	.2	3.9
Eric Montross^{†}	20	20	16.9	.395		.368	4.6	.4	.4	.6	3.4
Doug Overton	23	2	12.0	.381	.000	.875	.6	1.6	.3	.0	2.7
Anthony Parker	37	0	5.3	.397	.321	.650	.7	.5	.3	.1	1.9
Theo Ratliff^{†}	58	55	32.1	.512		.706	7.3	.7	.7	3.5	11.2
Brian Shaw^{†}	20	2	25.1	.367	.250	.632	3.2	4.4	.7	.2	6.1
Joe Smith^{†}	30	6	23.3	.448	.000	.788	4.4	.9	.6	.4	10.3
Eric Snow^{†}	47	0	18.0	.429	.125	.721	1.6	3.5	1.3	.1	3.9
Jerry Stackhouse^{†}	22	22	34.0	.452	.348	.802	3.5	3.0	1.4	1.0	16.0
Kebu Stewart	15	0	7.3	.462		.640	2.1	.1	.3	.1	2.7
Tim Thomas	77	48	23.1	.447	.363	.740	3.7	1.2	.7	.2	11.0
Rex Walters^{†}	19	0	6.7	.379	.214	1.000	.5	1.1	.3	.0	2.2
Clarence Weatherspoon^{†}	48	18	26.9	.426		.707	7.0	.8	.9	1.1	8.4
Scott Williams	58	7	13.8	.437	.000	.810	3.6	.5	.3	.4	4.1

- ^{†} Denotes player spent time with another team in the season. Stats reflect time with the 76ers only.

Player statistics citation:

== Awards and records ==
- Tim Thomas, NBA All-Rookie Team 2nd Team

== See also ==
- 1997–98 NBA season
