= Kevin Edwards =

American basketball player (born 1965)

Personal information
- Born: October 30, 1965 (age 61) Cleveland Heights, Ohio, U.S.
- Listed height: 6 ft 3 in (1.91 m)
- Listed weight: 190 lb (86 kg)

Career information
- High school: St. Joseph (Cleveland, Ohio)
- College: Lakeland CC (1984–1986); DePaul (1986–1988)
- NBA draft: 1988: 1st round, 20th overall pick
- Drafted by: Miami Heat
- Playing career: 1988–2001
- Position: Shooting guard
- Number: 21, 20

Career history
- 1988–1993: Miami Heat
- 1993–1998: New Jersey Nets
- 1998: Orlando Magic
- 2000–2001: Vancouver Grizzlies

Career highlights
- NBA All-Rookie Second Team (1989)

Career NBA statistics
- Points: 6,596 (10.9 ppg)
- Rebounds: 1,653 (2.7 rpg)
- Assists: 1,609 (2.7 apg)
- Stats at NBA.com
- Stats at Basketball Reference

Kevin Durell Edwards (born October 30, 1965) is an American former professional basketball player who currently serves as DePaul University men's basketball team's director of community, corporate, and professional relations. Edwards was selected by the Miami Heat with the 20th overall pick of the 1988 NBA draft. Edwards was the second ever draft pick in Miami Heat history, behind teammate Rony Seikaly who was selected as the 9th pick in the same draft.

He played in 11 NBA seasons for the Heat, New Jersey Nets, Orlando Magic and Vancouver Grizzlies. Edwards best year as a pro came during the 1993–94 season as a member of the Nets, appearing in all 82 games and averaging 14.0 ppg. He had the most points in all of his seasons with the Nets. In his NBA career, Edwards scored a total of 6,596 points in 604 games. He retired as a member of the Grizzlies in 2001. He has a wife and three children.

He played collegiately at DePaul University and Lakeland Community College (in Kirtland, Ohio).

After retiring from basketball, Edwards produced movies.

== Career statistics ==
Legend
GP	Games played	GS	Games started	MPG	Minutes per game
FG%	Field goal percentage	3P%	3-point field goal percentage	FT%	Free throw percentage
RPG	Rebounds per game	APG	Assists per game	SPG	Steals per game
BPG	Blocks per game	PPG	Points per game	**Bold**	Career high
*	Led the league

=== NBA ===
==== Regular season ====
Year	Team	GP	GS	MPG	FG%	3P%	FT%	RPG	APG	SPG	BPG	PPG
1988–89	Miami	79	62	29.7	.425	.270	.746	3.3	**4.4**	**1.8**	.3	13.8
1989–90	Miami	78	54	28.3	.412	.300	.760	**3.6**	3.2	1.6	.4	12.0
1990–91	Miami	79	16	25.3	.410	.286	.803	2.6	3.0	1.6	**.6**	12.1
1991–92	Miami	81	1	22.7	.454	.219	.848	2.6	2.1	1.2	.2	10.1
1992–93	Miami	40	30	28.4	**.468**	.294	.844	3.0	3.0	1.7	.3	13.9
1993–94	New Jersey	**82***	**82***	**33.3**	.458	.354	.770	3.4	2.8	1.5	.4	**14.0**
1994–95	New Jersey	14	14	**33.3**	.448	.400	**.952**	2.6	1.9	1.4	.4	**14.0**
1995–96	New Jersey	34	33	29.6	.364	.404	.810	2.2	2.1	1.6	.2	11.6
1996–97	New Jersey	32	0	14.9	.377	.349	.860	1.3	1.8	.5	.1	5.9
1997–98	New Jersey	27	5	13.0	.349	.364	.867	1.3	1.0	.8	.0	3.4
1997–98	Orlando	12	0	11.3	.339	**.500**	.850	1.7	1.1	.4	.1	4.9
2000–01	Vancouer	46	5	13.8	.329	.263	.811	1.8	1.1	.6	.2	3.5
Career		604	302	25.4	.423	.335	.803	2.7	2.7	1.4	.3	10.9

==== Playoffs ====
Year	Team	GP	GS	MPG	FG%	3P%	FT%	RPG	APG	SPG	BPG	PPG
1992	Miami	3	0	18.3	**.385**	–	.625	2.3	**2.3**	.7	.0	5.0
1994	New Jersey	**4**	**4**	**37.0**	.360	.000	**.929**	**4.0**	**2.3**	**1.3**	**.3**	**12.3**
Career		7	4	29.0	.365	.000	.818	3.3	2.3	1.0	.1	9.1
