= 1997–98 Boston Celtics season =

NBA basketball team season

- Head coach: Rick Pitino
- General manager: Rick Pitino
- Owner: Paul Gaston
- Arena: Fleet Center

Results
- Record: 36–46 (.439)
- Place: Division: 6th (Atlantic); Conference: 12th (Eastern)
- Playoff finish: Did not qualify
- Stats at Basketball Reference

Local media
- Television: WSBK-TV; SportsChannel/Fox Sports New England
- Radio: WEEI

The 1997–98 Boston Celtics season was the 52nd season for the Boston Celtics in the National Basketball Association.

== Season summary ==
=== Off-season ===
The Celtics received the third overall pick in the 1997 NBA draft, and selected point guard Chauncey Billups from the University of Colorado; the team also selected shooting guard Ron Mercer from the University of Kentucky with the sixth overall pick. The Celtics acquired the sixth pick in the draft from the Dallas Mavericks via trade. Despite finishing with the league's second worst record at 15–67 the previous season, the Celtics were back in the headlines after hiring University of Kentucky head coach Rick Pitino as their new coach, and team president.

During the off-season, the team signed free agents Chris Mills, second-year center Travis Knight, Andrew DeClercq, Bruce Bowen, Tony Massenburg, and Tyus Edney. However, later on in October, the Celtics traded Mills to the New York Knicks in exchange for second-year forward Walter McCarty, rookie power forward, and first-round draft pick John Thomas from the University of Minnesota, rookie small forward Dontae' Jones, and Scott Brooks. The team also traded Massenburg to the Vancouver Grizzlies in exchange for second-year forward Roy Rogers. The Celtics soon released Brooks to free agency as he later on signed with the Cleveland Cavaliers in December.

=== Regular season ===
In their regular season opener on October 31, 1997, and in their first game under Pitino, the Celtics faced off against All-Star guard Michael Jordan, and the 5-time defending NBA champion Chicago Bulls at home at the FleetCenter. Despite trailing 32–12 at the end of the first quarter, the Celtics defeated the Bulls by a score of 92–85, in front of a sellout crowd of 18,624 fans in attendance; the victory gave Pitino's career with the Celtics an auspicious beginning. Second-year star Antoine Walker contributed 31 points, 8 rebounds and 5 steals, while Jordan led the Bulls with 30 points, but struggled only making 7 out of 23 field-goal attempts.

Under Pitino and with the addition of Mercer, Billups, McCarty, Knight and DeClercq, the Celtics struggled losing five of their first six games of the regular season, but then won six of their next seven games. The team held a 16–14 record as of January 3, 1998, but soon fell below .500 in winning percentage losing eight of their next nine games, and later on held a 22–25 record at the All-Star break. At mid-season, the team traded Billups, Thomas, Rogers and Dee Brown to the Toronto Raptors in exchange for Kenny Anderson, Popeye Jones and Žan Tabak; the Raptors had acquired Anderson from the Portland Trail Blazers in a previous trade. Before the trade, Billups averaged 11.1 points, 4.3 assists and 1.5 steals per game in 51 games, while Brown contributed 6.8 points per game in 41 games. The Celtics posted a six-game losing streak in March, and finished in sixth place in the Atlantic Division with a 36–46 record, which was a 21-game improvement over the previous season; however, the team failed to qualify for the NBA playoffs.

Walker averaged 22.4 points, 10.2 rebounds and 1.7 steals per game, while Mercer averaged 15.3 points and 1.6 steals per game, and was named to the NBA All-Rookie First Team, and Anderson provided the team with 11.2 points, 6.3 assists and 1.6 steals per game in 16 games after the trade. In addition, McCarty provided with 9.6 points and 1.3 steals per game, while Dana Barros contributed 9.8 points and 3.6 assists per game, and led the Celtics with 100 three-point field goals, and Knight averaged 6.5 points and 4.9 rebounds per game. Meanwhile, Bowen provided with 5.6 points and 1.4 steals per game, DeClercq averaged 5.4 points and 4.8 rebounds per game, and Greg Minor contributed 5.0 points per game.

During the NBA All-Star weekend at Madison Square Garden in New York City, New York, Walker was selected for the 1998 NBA All-Star Game, as a member of the Eastern Conference All-Star team; it was his first ever All-Star appearance. Meanwhile, before the mid-season trade, Mercer and Billups were both selected for the NBA Rookie Game, as members of the Eastern Conference Rookie team. Walker finished in twelfth place in Most Valuable Player voting, and also finished tied in eighth place in Most Improved Player voting, while Pitino finished tied in seventh place in Coach of the Year voting.

The Celtics finished tenth in the NBA in home-game attendance, with an attendance of 739,422 at the FleetCenter during the regular season.

=== Aftermath ===
Following the season, Knight was traded back to his former team, the Los Angeles Lakers, after only one season with the Celtics, and Edney, Tabak and Dontae' Jones were all released to free agency.

== Draft picks ==
Round	Pick	Player	Position	Nationality	College
1	3	Chauncey Billups	PG	United States	Colorado
1	6	Ron Mercer	SF/SG	United States	Kentucky
2	56	Ben Pepper	C	Australia	Newcastle Falcons

== Roster ==
1997–98 Boston Celtics roster
Players

Pos.	No.	Player	Height	Weight	DOB	From
G	7	Kenny Anderson	6 ft 0 in (1.83 m)	168 lb (76 kg)	1970–10–09	Georgia Tech
G	11	Dana Barros	5 ft 11 in (1.80 m)	163 lb (74 kg)	1967–04–13	Boston College
F	12	Bruce Bowen	6 ft 7 in (2.01 m)	185 lb (84 kg)	1971–06–14	Cal State Fullerton
C	45	Andrew DeClercq	6 ft 10 in (2.08 m)	230 lb (104 kg)	1973–02–01	Florida
G	20	Tyus Edney	5 ft 10 in (1.78 m)	152 lb (69 kg)	1973–02–14	UCLA
F	29	Pervis Ellison	6 ft 9 in (2.06 m)	210 lb (95 kg)	1967–04–03	Louisville
F	34	Reggie Hanson	6 ft 8 in (2.03 m)	195 lb (88 kg)	1968–10–06	Kentucky
F	13	Dontae' Jones	6 ft 8 in (2.03 m)	220 lb (100 kg)	1975–06–02	Mississippi State
F	4	Popeye Jones (IN)	6 ft 8 in (2.03 m)	250 lb (113 kg)	1970–06–17	Murray State
C	40	Travis Knight	7 ft 0 in (2.13 m)	235 lb (107 kg)	1974–09–13	Connecticut
F	0	Walter McCarty	6 ft 10 in (2.08 m)	230 lb (104 kg)	1974–02–01	Kentucky
G	5	Ron Mercer	6 ft 7 in (2.01 m)	210 lb (95 kg)	1976–05–18	Kentucky
G	9	Greg Minor	6 ft 6 in (1.98 m)	210 lb (95 kg)	1971–09–18	Louisville
C	55	Žan Tabak	7 ft 0 in (2.13 m)	245 lb (111 kg)	1970–06–15	Croatia
F	8	Antoine Walker	6 ft 8 in (2.03 m)	224 lb (102 kg)	1976–08–12	Kentucky

Coaches
Head coach
- Rick Pitino
Assistant(s)
- Winston Bennett
- John Carroll
- Jim O'Brien

Legend
- (DP) Unsigned draft pick
- (FA) Free agent
- (S) Suspended
- (IN) Inactive
- Injured

Roster
Updated: April 14, 1998

=== Roster notes ===
- Power forward Popeye Jones was acquired by the Celtics from the Toronto Raptors in a mid-season trade, but was placed on the injured reserve list due to a season-ending left knee injury he sustained with the Raptors, and did not play for the Celtics this season.

== Regular season ==
=== Season standings ===
Atlantic Division	W	L	PCT	GB	Home	Road	Div
y-Miami Heat	55	27	.671	–	30-11	25–16	18–6
x-New York Knicks	43	39	.524	12	28–13	15–26	13–11
x-New Jersey Nets	43	39	.524	12	26–15	17–24	12–12
Washington Wizards	42	40	.512	13	24–17	18–23	12–13
Orlando Magic	41	41	.500	14	24–17	17–24	11–13
Boston Celtics	36	46	.439	19	24–17	12–29	12–12
Philadelphia 76ers	31	51	.378	24	19–22	12–29	7–17

#	Eastern Conference				
#	Team	W	L	PCT	GB
1	c-Chicago Bulls	62	20	.756	–
2	y-Miami Heat	55	27	.671	7
3	x-Indiana Pacers	58	24	.707	4
4	x-Charlotte Hornets	51	31	.622	11
5	x-Atlanta Hawks	50	32	.610	12
6	x-Cleveland Cavaliers	47	35	.573	15
7	x-New York Knicks	43	39	.524	19
8	x-New Jersey Nets	43	39	.524	19
9	Washington Wizards	42	40	.512	20
10	Orlando Magic	41	41	.500	21
11	Detroit Pistons	37	45	.451	25
12	Boston Celtics	36	46	.439	26
13	Milwaukee Bucks	36	46	.439	26
14	Philadelphia 76ers	31	51	.378	31
15	Toronto Raptors	16	66	.195	46

== Player statistics ==
Legend
GP	Games played	GS	Games started	MPG	Minutes per game
FG%	Field-goal percentage	3P%	3-point field-goal percentage	FT%	Free-throw percentage
RPG	Rebounds per game	APG	Assists per game	SPG	Steals per game
BPG	Blocks per game	PPG	Points per game

=== Regular season ===
Boston Celtics statistics
Player	GP	GS	MPG	FG%	3P%	FT%	RPG	APG	SPG	BPG	PPG
Kenny Anderson^{†}	16	16	24.1	.435	.370	.837	2.4	6.3	1.6	.0	11.2
Dana Barros	80	15	21.1	.461	.407	.847	1.9	3.6	1.0	.1	9.8
Chauncey Billups^{†}	51	44	25.4	.390	.339	.817	2.2	4.3	1.5	.0	11.1
Bruce Bowen	61	9	21.4	.409	.339	.623	2.9	1.3	1.4	.5	5.6
Dee Brown^{†}	41	10	19.8	.427	.381	.679	1.5	1.3	1.1	.1	6.8
Andrew DeClercq	81	49	18.8	.497	.000	.601	4.8	.7	1.0	.6	5.4
Tyus Edney	52	7	12.0	.431	.300	.793	1.1	2.7	1.0	.0	5.3
Pervis Ellison	33	8	13.5	.571		.588	3.3	.9	.6	.9	3.0
Reggie Hanson	8	0	3.3	.500			.8	.1	.3	.1	.8
Dontae' Jones	15	0	6.1	.333	.261		.6	.3	.1	.2	2.9
Travis Knight	74	21	20.3	.441	.273	.786	4.9	1.4	.7	1.1	6.5
Walter McCarty	82	64	28.5	.404	.309	.742	4.4	2.2	1.3	.5	9.6
Ron Mercer	80	62	33.3	.450	.107	.839	3.5	2.2	1.6	.2	15.3
Greg Minor	69	16	16.3	.436	.194	.686	2.2	1.3	.8	.2	5.0
Roy Rogers^{†}	9	0	4.1	.375		.500	.6	.1	.2	.4	.8
Žan Tabak^{†}	18	5	12.9	.473		.538	3.2	.7	.3	.6	3.3
John Thomas^{†}	33	2	11.2	.513		.788	2.1	.4	.6	.3	3.3
Antoine Walker	82	82	39.9	.423	.312	.645	10.2	3.3	1.7	.7	22.4

- ^{†} Denotes player spent time with another team in the season. Stats reflect time with the Celtics only.

Player statistics citation:

== Awards and records ==
- Ron Mercer, NBA All-Rookie Team 1st Team

== See also ==
- 1997–98 NBA season
