= Brian Evans (basketball) =

American basketball player (born 1973)

Brian "Dutch" Evans
Personal information
- Born: September 13, 1973 (age 53) Rockford, Illinois, U.S.
- Listed height: 6 ft 8 in (2.03 m)
- Listed weight: 220 lb (100 kg)

Career information
- High school: South (Terre Haute, Indiana)
- College: Indiana (1992–1996)
- NBA draft: 1996: 1st round, 27th overall pick
- Drafted by: Orlando Magic
- Playing career: 1996–2005
- Position: Power forward
- Number: 34, 11

Career history
- 1996–1998: Orlando Magic
- 1998–1999: New Jersey Nets
- 1999: Minnesota Timberwolves
- 1999–2000: Lineltex Imola
- 2000–2001: Montepaschi Siena
- 2001–2002: Viola Reggio Calabria
- 2002–2003: Bipop-Carire Reggio Emilia
- 2003–2005: Hitachi SunRockers

Career highlights
- Third-team All-American – AP, NABC, UPI (1996); Big Ten Player of the Year (1996)

Career NBA statistics
- Points: 375 (3.7 ppg)
- Rebounds: 164 (1.6 rpg)
- Stats at NBA.com
- Stats at Basketball Reference
Medals
Men's basketball
Representing United States
Summer Universiade
Gold medal – first place	1995 Fukuoka	Team competition

Brian Keith Evans (born September 13, 1973) is an American former professional basketball player who played in the National Basketball Association (NBA) and other leagues. A 6'8" and 220 lb forward, he played high school basketball at Terre Haute, Indiana South. Evans attended Indiana University from 1991–96, and played for the Hoosiers from 1992–96. Evans was named Big Ten MVP in 1996. He was selected with the 27th overall pick in the 1996 NBA draft by the Orlando Magic.

He played professionally in Italy for Lineltex Imola (1999–2000), Montepaschi Siena (2000–2001) and Viola Reggio Calabria (2001–2002).

As of February 2016, he was the co-owner of Precision Medical Group, an Indianapolis-based company that sells medical products.
