= 1997–98 Indiana Pacers season =

NBA professional basketball team season

- Head coach: Larry Bird
- President: Donnie Walsh
- General manager: Donnie Walsh
- Owners: Herbert Simon; Melvin Simon
- Arena: Market Square Arena

Results
- Record: 58–24 (.707)
- Place: Division: 2nd (Central); Conference: 3rd (Eastern)
- Playoff finish: Eastern Conference finals (lost to Bulls 3–4)
- Stats at Basketball Reference

Local media
- Television: WTTV; Fox Sports Midwest
- Radio: WIBC

The 1997–98 Indiana Pacers season was the 22nd season for the Indiana Pacers in the National Basketball Association, and their 31st season as a franchise.

== Season summary ==
=== Off-season ===
The Pacers received the twelfth overall pick in the 1997 NBA draft, and selected power forward Austin Croshere out of Providence College. During the off-season, the team hired former Indiana State University, and Boston Celtics All-Star legend Larry Bird as their new head coach, acquired All-Star forward Chris Mullin from the Golden State Warriors, and signed free agent Mark West; Bird and Mullin were once teammates on the "Dream Team" from the 1992 Summer Olympics in Barcelona, Spain.

For the season, the Pacers redesigned their home and road uniforms, which featured pinstripes, a dark navy blue and golden yellow trim, golden yellow side panels on their jerseys and shorts, and the team's primary logo on both legs of their shorts. The white home uniforms featured dark navy blue pinstripes and outlines, while the dark navy blue road uniforms featured golden yellow pinstripes, and dark navy blue and white outlines. The team's new pinstriped uniforms would remain in use until 2005.

=== Regular season ===
Under Bird and with the addition of Mullin, the Pacers struggled losing five of their first seven games of the regular season, but then played above .500 in winning percentage for the remainder of the season, winning 15 of their next 18 games. The team won 12 of their 14 games in January, posted a seven-game winning streak between January and February, and held the best record in the Eastern Conference at 33–13 before the All-Star break. The Pacers won nine of their final eleven games of the season, which included another seven-game winning streak in April, and returned to the NBA playoffs after a one-year absence, finishing in second place in the Central Division with a 58–24 record, and earning the third seed in the Eastern Conference. It was also the first time since joining the NBA that the Pacers finished with a winning road record above. 500, posting a 26–15 road record during the regular season. Bird was named the NBA Coach of the Year, after leading the Pacers to a 19-game improvement over the previous season. The Pacers had the fifth best team defensive rating in the NBA.

Reggie Miller averaged 19.5 points per game, led the Pacers with 164 three-point field goals, and was named to the All-NBA Third Team, while Rik Smits averaged 16.7 points and 6.9 rebounds per game, and Mullin provided the team with 11.3 points per game and 107 three-point field goals. In addition, Mark Jackson contributed 8.3 points and 8.7 assists per game, while Dale Davis provided with 8.0 points and 7.8 rebounds per game. Off the bench, sixth man Antonio Davis averaged 9.6 points and 6.8 rebounds per game, while Jalen Rose contributed 9.4 points per game, Travis Best provided with 6.5 points and 3.4 assists per game, Derrick McKey averaged 6.3 points per game, but only played 57 games due to a ruptured Achilles tendon, and Fred Hoiberg contributed 4.0 points per game.

During the NBA All-Star weekend at Madison Square Garden in New York City, New York, Miller and Smits were both selected for the 1998 NBA All-Star Game, as members of the Eastern Conference All-Star team, while Bird was selected to coach the Eastern Conference; it was Smits's first and only All-Star appearance. Miller was also booed by the fans at Madison Square Garden during the All-Star introductions, due to the Knicks–Pacers rivalry. In addition, Miller also participated in the NBA Three-Point Shootout for the fifth time. Miller and Smits both finished tied in 16th place in Most Valuable Player voting, while Rose finished tied in 13th place in Most Improved Player voting.

The Pacers finished 21st in the NBA in home-game attendance, with an attendance of 645,302 at the Market Square Arena during the regular season.

=== NBA playoffs ===
In the Eastern Conference First Round of the 1998 NBA playoffs, the Pacers faced off against the 6th–seeded Cleveland Cavaliers, a team that featured All-Star forward Shawn Kemp, three-point specialist Wesley Person, and rookie center Zydrunas Ilgauskas. The Pacers won the first two games over the Cavaliers at home at the Market Square Arena, before losing Game 3 on the road, 86–77 at the Gund Arena. The Pacers won Game 4 over the Cavaliers on the road, 80–74 to win the series in four games.

In the Eastern Conference Semi-finals, the team faced off against the 7th–seeded New York Knicks, a team that featured Allan Houston, Larry Johnson, and sixth man John Starks. All-Star center Patrick Ewing returned from a season-ending wrist injury to play in Game 2. The Pacers took a 2–0 series lead before losing Game 3 to the Knicks on the road, 83–76 at Madison Square Garden, but managed to win Game 4 on the road in overtime, 118–107, which featured a 38-point performance from Miller. The Pacers won Game 5 over the Knicks at the Market Square Arena, 99–88 to win the series in five games.

In the Eastern Conference Finals, the Pacers then faced off against the top–seeded, and 2-time defending NBA champion Chicago Bulls, who won the Central Division title, and were led by the trio of All-Star guard, and Most Valuable Player of the Year, Michael Jordan, All-Star forward Scottie Pippen, and rebound-specialist Dennis Rodman, and were also led by head coach Phil Jackson. The Pacers lost the first two games to the Bulls on the road at the United Center, but managed to win their next two home games, as Miller hit a game-winning three-pointer in Game 4, in which the Pacers defeated the Bulls, 96–94 at the Market Square Arena. After losing Game 5 at the United Center by a score of 106–87, the Pacers won Game 6 over the Bulls at the Market Square Arena, 92–89 to even the series at 3–3. In Game 7 at the United Center, the Pacers held a 72–69 lead with 8:54 left in the game, but lost to the Bulls, 88–83, thus losing in a hard-fought seven-game series.

The Bulls would go on to defeat the Utah Jazz in six games in the 1998 NBA Finals for their third consecutive NBA championship, and sixth overall in eight years.

=== Notable highlights ===
One notable highlight of the regular season occurred on February 27, 1998, in which the Pacers defeated the Portland Trail Blazers at home, 124–59 at the Market Square Arena. It was the first time in NBA history that a team scored twice as more points than their opponent.

=== Aftermath ===
Following the season, West signed as a free agent with the Atlanta Hawks, and Haywoode Workman, who missed the entire regular season due to a knee injury, was released to free agency and signed with the Milwaukee Bucks midway through the next season.

== Draft picks ==
Round	Pick	Player	Position	Nationality	College
1	12	Austin Croshere	SF/PF	United States	Providence

== Roster ==
1997–98 Indiana Pacers roster
Players

Pos.	No.	Player	Height	Weight	DOB	From
G	4	Travis Best	5 ft 11 in (1.80 m)	182 lb (83 kg)	1972–07–12	Georgia Tech
F	21	Etdrick Bohannon	6 ft 9 in (2.06 m)	220 lb (100 kg)	1973–05–29	Auburn Montgomery
F	44	Austin Croshere	6 ft 9 in (2.06 m)	235 lb (107 kg)	1975–05–01	Providence
F/C	33	Antonio Davis	6 ft 9 in (2.06 m)	215 lb (98 kg)	1968–10–31	UTEP
F/C	32	Dale Davis	6 ft 11 in (2.11 m)	230 lb (104 kg)	1969–03–25	Clemson
G	20	Fred Hoiberg	6 ft 4 in (1.93 m)	203 lb (92 kg)	1972–10–15	Iowa State
G	13	Mark Jackson	6 ft 1 in (1.85 m)	180 lb (82 kg)	1965–04–01	St. John's
F	9	Derrick McKey	6 ft 9 in (2.06 m)	205 lb (93 kg)	1966–10–10	Alabama
G	31	Reggie Miller	6 ft 7 in (2.01 m)	185 lb (84 kg)	1965–08–24	UCLA
F	17	Chris Mullin	6 ft 6 in (1.98 m)	200 lb (91 kg)	1963–07–30	St. John's
F	43	Mark Pope	6 ft 10 in (2.08 m)	235 lb (107 kg)	1972–09–11	Kentucky
F	5	Jalen Rose	6 ft 8 in (2.03 m)	210 lb (95 kg)	1973–01–30	Michigan
C	45	Rik Smits	7 ft 4 in (2.24 m)	250 lb (113 kg)	1966–08–23	Marist
C	41	Mark West	6 ft 10 in (2.08 m)	230 lb (104 kg)	1960–11–05	Old Dominion
G	3	Haywoode Workman (IN)	6 ft 2 in (1.88 m)	180 lb (82 kg)	1966–01–23	Oral Roberts

Coaches
Head coach
- Larry Bird
Assistant(s)
- Rick Carlisle
- Dick Harter

Legend
- (DP) Unsigned draft pick
- (FA) Free agent
- (S) Suspended
- (IN) Inactive
- Injured

Roster
Updated: September 8, 1997

=== Roster notes ===
- Point guard Haywoode Workman was on the injured reserve list due to a knee injury, and missed the entire regular season.

== Regular season ==
=== Season standings ===
Central Division	W	L	PCT	GB	Home	Road	Div
y-Chicago Bulls	62	20	.756	–	37–4	25–16	21–7
x-Indiana Pacers	58	24	.707	4	32–9	26–15	19–9
x-Charlotte Hornets	51	31	.622	11	32–9	19–22	16–12
x-Atlanta Hawks	50	32	.610	12	29–12	21–20	19–9
x-Cleveland Cavaliers	47	35	.573	15	27–14	20–21	14–14
Detroit Pistons	37	45	.451	25	25–16	12–29	12–16
Milwaukee Bucks	36	46	.439	26	21–20	15–26	9–19
Toronto Raptors	16	66	.195	46	9–32	7–34	2–26

#	Eastern Conference				
#	Team	W	L	PCT	GB
1	c-Chicago Bulls	62	20	.756	–
2	y-Miami Heat	55	27	.671	7
3	x-Indiana Pacers	58	24	.707	4
4	x-Charlotte Hornets	51	31	.622	11
5	x-Atlanta Hawks	50	32	.610	12
6	x-Cleveland Cavaliers	47	35	.573	15
7	x-New York Knicks	43	39	.524	19
8	x-New Jersey Nets	43	39	.524	19
9	Washington Wizards	42	40	.512	20
10	Orlando Magic	41	41	.500	21
11	Detroit Pistons	37	45	.451	25
12	Boston Celtics	36	46	.439	26
13	Milwaukee Bucks	36	46	.439	26
14	Philadelphia 76ers	31	51	.378	31
15	Toronto Raptors	16	66	.195	46

z - clinched division title
y - clinched division title
x - clinched playoff spot

== Game log ==
=== Regular season ===
1997–98 game log
Total: 58–24 (home: 31–10; road: 27–14)
October: 0–1 (home: 0–0; road: 0–1)

Game	Date	Team	Score	High points	High rebounds	High assists	Location Attendance	Record
1	October 31, 1997	@ New Jersey	L 95–97				Continental Airlines Arena	0–1

November: 8–5 (home: 5–3; road: 3–2)

Game	Date	Team	Score	High points	High rebounds	High assists	Location Attendance	Record
2	November 1, 1997	Golden State	W 96–83				Market Square Arena	1–1
3	November 4, 1997	@ Cleveland	L 77–80				Gund Arena	1–2
4	November 5, 1997	@ Detroit	W 99–87				The Palace of Auburn Hills	2–2
5	November 7, 1997	Seattle	L 93–99				Market Square Arena	2–3
6	November 8, 1997	@ Charlotte	L 82–89				Charlotte Coliseum	2–4
7	November 12, 1997	Atlanta	L 86–89				Market Square Arena	2–5
8	November 14, 1997	Miami	W 82–78				Market Square Arena	3–5
9	November 15, 1997	@ Toronto	W 105–77				SkyDome	4–5
10	November 20, 1997	@ Milwaukee	W 109–83				Bradley Center	5–5
11	November 22, 1997	Charlotte	L 94–95				Market Square Arena	5–6
12	November 27, 1997	Vancouver	W 106–85				Market Square Arena	6–6
13	November 28, 1997	Chicago	W 94–83				Market Square Arena	7–6
14	November 30, 1997	Philadelphia	W 101–89				Market Square Arena	8–6

December: 11–4 (home: 6–0; road: 5–4)

Game	Date	Team	Score	High points	High rebounds	High assists	Location Attendance	Record
15	December 3, 1997	@ Minnesota	W 94–90				Target Center	9–6
16	December 5, 1997	@ Denver	W 96–85				McNichols Sports Arena	10–6
17	December 7, 1997	@ Phoenix	W 99–97 (OT)				America West Arena	11–6
18	December 8, 1997	@ Utah	L 97–106				Delta Center	11–7
19	December 10, 1997	@ Portland	L 85–93				Rose Garden	11–8
20	December 12, 1997	Miami	W 104–89				Market Square Arena	12–8
21	December 13, 1997	Washington	W 109–92				Market Square Arena	13–8
22	December 15, 1997	@ Toronto	W 108–101				SkyDome	14–8
23	December 17, 1997	New York	W 87–80				Market Square Arena	15–8
24	December 19, 1997	Detroit	W 98–90				Market Square Arena	16–8
25	December 20, 1997	@ Orlando	W 95–92				Orlando Arena	17–8
26	December 23, 1997	@ San Antonio	L 79–91				Alamodome	17–9
27	December 26, 1997	Orlando	W 107–81				Market Square Arena	18–9
28	December 28, 1997	@ Miami	L 90–101				Miami Arena	18–10
29	December 30, 1997	New Jersey	W 109–91				Market Square Arena	19–10

January: 12–2 (home: 7–1; road: 5–1)

Game	Date	Team	Score	High points	High rebounds	High assists	Location Attendance	Record
30	January 2, 1998	@ Washington	W 99–81				MCI Center	20–10
31	January 3, 1998	Toronto	W 89–77				Market Square Arena	21–10
32	January 6, 1998	Phoenix	L 80–81				Market Square Arena	21–11
33	January 8, 1998	@ Houston	W 87–80				Compaq Center	22–11
34	January 10, 1998	@ Dallas	W 84–79				Reunion Arena	23–11
35	January 14, 1998	Detroit	W 100–93				Market Square Arena	24–11
36	January 16, 1998	Sacramento	W 117–92				Market Square Arena	25–11
37	January 18, 1998	@ Boston	W 103–96				FleetCenter	26–11
38	January 21, 1998	@ New York	L 89–97				Madison Square Garden	26–12
39	January 23, 1998	Utah	W 106–102				Market Square Arena	27–12
40	January 24, 1998	Boston	W 95–88				Market Square Arena	28–12
41	January 27, 1998	Washington	W 85–84				Market Square Arena	29–12
42	January 28, 1998	@ Philadelphia	W 93–90 (OT)				CoreStates Center	30–12
43	January 30, 1998	Cleveland	W 89–83				Market Square Arena	31–12

February: 8–5 (home: 3–2; road: 5–3)

Game	Date	Team	Score	High points	High rebounds	High assists	Location Attendance	Record
44	February 1, 1998	@ L.A. Clippers	W 99–92				Los Angeles Memorial Sports Arena	32–12
45	February 3, 1998	@ Sacramento	W 115–93				ARCO Arena	33–12
46	February 4, 1998	@ Seattle	L 97–104				KeyArena	33–13
All-Star Break
47	February 10, 1998	Orlando	W 85–66				Market Square Arena	34–13
48	February 11, 1998	@ Miami	W 110–101				Miami Arena	35–13
49	February 13, 1998	Dallas	L 82–85 (2OT)				Market Square Arena	35–14
50	February 14, 1998	@ Atlanta	W 96–92				Georgia Dome	36–14
51	February 17, 1998	@ Chicago	L 97–105				United Center	36–15
52	February 19, 1998	Philadelphia	W 82–77				Market Square Arena	37–15
53	February 20, 1998	@ Orlando	L 91–93				Orlando Arena	37–16
54	February 22, 1998	@ Philadelphia	W 97–92				CoreStates Center	38–16
55	February 25, 1998	L.A. Lakers	L 89–96				Market Square Arena	38–17
56	February 27, 1998	Portland	W 124–59				Market Square Arena	39–17

March: 11–5 (home: 6–3; road: 5–2)

Game	Date	Team	Score	High points	High rebounds	High assists	Location Attendance	Record
57	March 1, 1998	Denver	W 90–63				Market Square Arena	40–17
58	March 3, 1998	@ Vancouver	W 111–103				General Motors Place	41–17
59	March 4, 1998	@ L.A. Lakers	L 95–104				Great Western Forum	41–18
60	March 6, 1998	@ Golden State	W 101–87				The Arena in Oakland	42–18
61	March 8, 1998	Boston	W 104–100				Market Square Arena	43–18
62	March 11, 1998	@ Detroit	L 91–122				The Palace of Auburn Hills	43–19
63	March 13, 1998	Milwaukee	W 96–76				Market Square Arena	44–19
64	March 15, 1998	@ New York	W 91–86				Madison Square Garden	45–19
65	March 17, 1998	Chicago	L 84–90				Market Square Arena	45–20
66	March 19, 1998	@ Washington	W 95–91				MCI Center	46–20
67	March 20, 1998	New Jersey	W 99–92				Market Square Arena	47–20
68	March 22, 1998	@ Milwaukee	W 96–94 (OT)				Bradley Center	48–20
69	March 25, 1998	Houston	L 81–86				Market Square Arena	48–21
70	March 27, 1998	Charlotte	W 133–96				Market Square Arena	49–21
71	March 29, 1998	San Antonio	L 55–74				Market Square Arena	49–22
72	March 31, 1998	L.A. Clippers	W 128–106				Market Square Arena	50–22

April: 9–1 (home: 5–0; road: 4–1)

Game	Date	Team	Score	High points	High rebounds	High assists	Location Attendance	Record
73	April 2, 1998	Minnesota	W 111–108				Market Square Arena	51–22
74	April 3, 1998	@ Charlotte	L 89–96				Charlotte Coliseum	51–23
75	April 5, 1998	Milwaukee	W 93–92				Market Square Arena	52–23
76	April 7, 1998	Cleveland	W 82–80				Market Square Arena	53–23
77	April 9, 1998	@ Atlanta	W 105–102 (OT)				Georgia Dome	54–23
78	April 12, 1998	@ Boston	W 93–87				FleetCenter	55–23
79	April 13, 1998	@ Chicago	W 114–105				United Center	56–23
80	April 15, 1998	Atlanta	W 82–70				Market Square Arena	57–23
81	April 17, 1998	Toronto	W 107–98				Market Square Arena	58–23
82	April 18, 1998	@ Cleveland	L 92–96				Gund Arena	58–24

1997–98 schedule

== Playoffs ==
1998 playoff game log
Eastern Conference First Round: 3–1 (home: 2–0; road: 1–1)

Game	Date	Team	Score	High points	High rebounds	High assists	Location Attendance	Series
1	April 23, 1998	Cleveland	W 106–77	Mullin (20)	Mullin (6)	Jackson (10)	Market Square Arena; 16,644	1–0
2	April 25, 1998	Cleveland	W 92–86	Miller (18)	D. Davis (10)	Jackson (11)	Market Square Arena; 16,617	2–0
3	April 27, 1998	@ Cleveland	L 77–86	Smits (26)	D. Davis (9)	Jackson (17)	Gund Arena; 17,495	2–1
4	April 30, 1998	@ Cleveland	W 80–74	Miller (19)	A. Davis (9)	Jackson (6)	Gund Arena; 18,188	3–1

Eastern Conference semifinals: 4–1 (home: 3–0; road: 1–1)

Game	Date	Team	Score	High points	High rebounds	High assists	Location Attendance	Series
1	May 5, 1998	New York	W 93–83	Miller (17)	D. Davis (11)	Jackson (6)	Market Square Arena; 16,630	1–0
2	May 7, 1998	New York	W 85–77	Smits (22)	D. Davis (9)	Jackson (5)	Market Square Arena; 16,765	2–0
3	May 9, 1998	@ New York	L 76–83	Miller (23)	D. Davis (9)	Jackson (9)	Madison Square Garden; 19,763	2–1
4	May 10, 1998	@ New York	W 118–107 (OT)	Miller (38)	A. Davis (9)	Jackson (15)	Madison Square Garden; 19,763	3–1
5	May 13, 1998	New York	W 99–88	Miller (24)	Jackson (14)	Jackson (13)	Market Square Arena; 16,767	4–1

Eastern Conference finals: 3–4 (home: 3–0; road: 0–4)

Game	Date	Team	Score	High points	High rebounds	High assists	Location Attendance	Series
1	May 17, 1998	@ Chicago	L 79–85	Miller (16)	A. Davis (11)	Jackson (6)	United Center; 23,844	0–1
2	May 19, 1998	@ Chicago	L 98–104	Miller (19)	D. Davis (9)	Jackson (8)	United Center; 23,844	0–2
3	May 23, 1998	Chicago	W 107–105	Miller (28)	A. Davis (12)	Jackson, Rose (6)	Market Square Arena; 16,576	1–2
4	May 25, 1998	Chicago	W 96–94	Smits (26)	Mullin (9)	Jackson (7)	Market Square Arena; 16,560	2–2
5	May 27, 1998	@ Chicago	L 87–106	Miller (14)	A. Davis, Smits (7)	Jackson (5)	United Center; 23,844	2–3
6	May 29, 1998	Chicago	W 92–89	Smits (25)	D. Davis (8)	Best, A. Davis, Jackson (3)	Market Square Arena; 16,566	3–3
7	May 31, 1998	@ Chicago	L 83–88	Miller (22)	A. Davis (10)	Jackson (6)	United Center; 23,844	3–4

1998 schedule

== Player statistics ==
=== Regular season ===
Player	POS	GP	GS	MP	REB	AST	STL	BLK	PTS	MPG	RPG	APG	SPG	BPG	PPG
Mark Jackson	PG	82	82	2,413	322	713	84	2	678	29.4	3.9	8.7	1.0	.0	8.3
Chris Mullin	SF	82	82	2,177	249	186	95	39	927	26.5	3.0	2.3	1.2	.5	11.3
Antonio Davis	PF	82	12	2,191	560	61	45	72	785	26.7	6.8	.7	.5	.9	9.6
Jalen Rose	SF	82	0	1,706	195	155	56	14	771	20.8	2.4	1.9	.7	.2	9.4
Travis Best	PG	82	0	1,547	122	281	85	5	535	18.9	1.5	3.4	1.0	.1	6.5
Reggie Miller	SG	81	81	2,795	232	171	78	11	1,578	34.5	2.9	2.1	1.0	.1	19.5
Dale Davis	C	78	78	2,174	611	70	51	87	626	27.9	7.8	.9	.7	1.1	8.0
Rik Smits	C	73	69	2,085	505	101	40	88	1,216	28.6	6.9	1.4	.5	1.2	16.7
Fred Hoiberg	SG	65	1	874	123	45	40	3	261	13.4	1.9	.7	.6	.0	4.0
Derrick McKey	SF	57	4	1,316	211	88	57	30	359	23.1	3.7	1.5	1.0	.5	6.3
Mark Pope	SF	28	0	193	26	7	3	6	39	6.9	.9	.3	.1	.2	1.4
Austin Croshere	PF	26	0	243	45	8	9	5	76	9.3	1.7	.3	.3	.2	2.9
Mark West	C	15	1	105	15	2	2	4	23	7.0	1.0	.1	.1	.3	1.5
Etdrick Bohannon	PF	5	0	11	6	1	0	2	0	2.2	1.2	.2	.0	.4	.0

=== Playoffs ===
Player	POS	GP	GS	MP	REB	AST	STL	BLK	PTS	MPG	RPG	APG	SPG	BPG	PPG
Reggie Miller	SG	16	16	628	28	32	19	3	319	39.3	1.8	2.0	1.2	.2	19.9
Mark Jackson	PG	16	16	494	73	133	23	0	147	30.9	4.6	8.3	1.4	.0	9.2
Rik Smits	C	16	16	476	85	20	8	14	265	29.8	5.3	1.3	.5	.9	16.6
Dale Davis	C	16	16	466	120	12	5	18	141	29.1	7.5	.8	.3	1.1	8.8
Chris Mullin	SF	16	16	412	57	23	15	9	142	25.8	3.6	1.4	.9	.6	8.9
Antonio Davis	PF	16	0	459	108	14	12	18	147	28.7	6.8	.9	.8	1.1	9.2
Travis Best	PG	16	0	280	16	31	11	3	97	17.5	1.0	1.9	.7	.2	6.1
Jalen Rose	SF	15	0	293	27	28	11	6	122	19.5	1.8	1.9	.7	.4	8.1
Derrick McKey	SF	15	0	284	40	11	9	8	67	18.9	2.7	.7	.6	.5	4.5
Mark Pope	SF	7	0	42	5	1	1	0	9	6.0	.7	.1	.1	.0	1.3
Mark West	C	4	0	11	1	0	0	0	3	2.8	.3	.0	.0	.0	.8
Fred Hoiberg	SG	2	0	20	4	1	1	0	9	10.0	2.0	.5	.5	.0	4.5

== Awards ==
- Larry Bird, NBA Coach of the Year Award
- Larry Bird, All-Star East Head Coach
- Reggie Miller, NBA All-Star Game
- Rik Smits, NBA All-Star Game
- Reggie Miller, All-NBA Third Team

== See also ==
- 1997–98 NBA season
