= Antonio Davis =

American basketball player (born 1968)

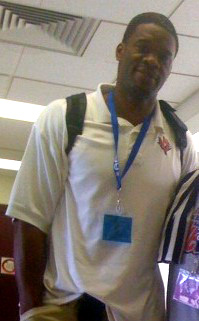
- Davis in 2009

Personal information
- Born: October 31, 1968 (age 58) Oakland, California, U.S.
- Listed height: 6 ft 9 in (2.06 m)
- Listed weight: 245 lb (111 kg)

Career information
- High school: McClymonds (Oakland, California)
- College: UTEP (1986–1990)
- NBA draft: 1990: 2nd round, 45th overall pick
- Drafted by: Indiana Pacers
- Playing career: 1990–2006
- Position: Power forward / center
- Number: 33, 34, 32, 11

Career history
- 1990–1992: Panathinaikos
- 1992–1993: Philips Milano
- 1993–1999: Indiana Pacers
- 1999–2003: Toronto Raptors
- 2003–2005: Chicago Bulls
- 2005–2006: New York Knicks
- 2006: Toronto Raptors

Career highlights
- NBA All-Star (2001); FIBA Korać Cup champion (1993); Greek League All-Star (1991)

Career NBA statistics
- Points: 9,041 (10.0 ppg)
- Rebounds: 6,755 (7.5 rpg)
- Blocks: 889 (1.0 bpg)
- Stats at NBA.com
- Stats at Basketball Reference
Medals
Men's basketball
Representing the United States
FIBA Americas Championship
Silver medal – second place	1989 Mexico City	Team competition

Antonio Lee Davis (born October 31, 1968) is an American former professional basketball player who played for the Indiana Pacers, Toronto Raptors, Chicago Bulls, and New York Knicks of the National Basketball Association (NBA). He also played for Panathinaikos B.C. in Greece and Philips Milano in Italy. Davis is also the former president of the National Basketball Players Association (NBPA). On October 31, 2012, ESPN announced the hiring of Davis as a studio analyst for NBA broadcasts. He is also currently a co-host/analyst on SiriusXM NBA Radio.

== College career ==
Davis played college basketball at UTEP under coach Don Haskins from 1986 to 1990. Teaming up with fellow future NBA-All star Tim Hardaway, Davis helped the Miners win 25 games and earn the seventh seed in the 1987 NCAA tournament as they defeated the number ten seed Arizona in overtime by a score of 98–91; they would, however, lose in the second round to Iowa by a score of 84–82. The next year, Davis started 30 games and averaged nearly 10 points with 6 rebounds as the Miners won 23 games and again advanced to the tournament, only to lose to number nine seed Seton Hall by a score of 80–64. As a junior, Davis averaged 14 points (second to Hardaway) with 8 rebounds a game as the Miners won 26 games and again gained the seventh seed, in the 1989 NCAA tournament, where they defeated number 10 seed LSU by a score of 85–74, only to lose in the second round to second-seeded Indiana by a score of 92–69. In Davis' senior year, (despite the departure of Hardaway to the NBA) the Miners still won 21 games, with Davis averaging 10 points and 7 rebounds a game; they would lose to the number six seed coming out of the tournament that year, Minnesota. After four seasons at UTEP, Davis declared for the 1990 NBA draft.

== European career ==
Davis was drafted by the Indiana Pacers in the second round, 45th overall of the 1990 NBA draft. He initially went on to play with professional teams in Europe, rather than play in the NBA. He played with Panathinaikos in the Greek League from 1990 to 1992, and with Philips Milano of the Italian League, during the 1992–93 season.

Davis also played in Europe's 3rd-tier level league, the FIBA Korać Cup, with both teams and while he was with Milano, he won the Korać Cup championship in the 1992–93 season.

== NBA career ==
=== Early career ===
==== Indiana Pacers ====
In 1993, Davis returned to the United States to play in the NBA for the 1993–94 season when he signed with the Indiana Pacers as a free agent. As a rookie off the bench, Davis played in 81 games and helped the Pacers to the playoffs where they swept the Orlando Magic in three straight games then upset the top-seeded Atlanta Hawks in six games in the first two rounds en route to facing the Patrick Ewing-led New York Knicks in the Eastern Conference Finals. The Pacers dropped the first two games in New York before rebounding to take the next two in Indiana; in game five in New York teammate Reggie Miller scored 25 points in the fourth quarter to lead the Pacers to the victory. The Pacers then returned to Indianapolis with the chance to clinch the Eastern Conference title but lost both game six and the series.

The next year the Pacers won 52 games and the Central Division title thanks to the addition of Mark Jackson; Davis meanwhile played in 44 games averaging 7.6 points a game with 6.4 rebounds a game as he missed significant time due to injury. In the playoffs the Pacers faced the Atlanta Hawks for the second consecutive season. The Pacers swept the Hawks in three straight games, then found themselves in a rematch with the Knicks in the second round; in game one (which saw the ejections of Davis and Derek Harper) teammate Reggie Miller made a three-pointer and then stole the inbounds pass and tied the game with another three-pointer right in front of Knicks fan Spike Lee who was just a few feet away. Miller added 2 free throws and gave the Pacers a comeback win. The Pacers lost Game 2 and the series returned to Indiana. After four games, the Pacers took a 3–1 series lead; however, the Knicks bounced back and forces the seventh game at Madison Square Garden. The Pacers emerged victorious as Patrick Ewing's last-second shot did not go in the basket. With a 1-point win, the Pacers qualified for the Eastern Conference Finals for the second consecutive season. As with their first and second-round opponents, the Pacers played a young talented Orlando Magic team led by Shaquille O'Neal and Penny Hardaway in a rematch of the previous postseason. The Pacers pushed Orlando to a 7th game before losing the series.

The following season was the most challenging in franchise history but despite that the Pacers duplicated their record from the previous season, 52–30, with Davis averaging 8.8 points a game with 6.1 rebounds a game. In the playoffs, the Pacers were defeated by the sixth-seeded Atlanta Hawks in five games.

Dale and Antonio [Davis], two of the roughest forwards in the game.

— Shaquille O'Neal on Antonio and Dale Davis

In the 1996–97 season the Pacers finished sixth in the Central Division with a record of 39–43 and missed the playoffs for the first time since 1989 despite Davis playing in 82 games, starting 28 of them and averaging 10.5 points with 7.3 rebounds a game. The next year the Pacers bounced back and won 58 games and the second seed in the Eastern Conference (with the additions of former Boston Celtics player Larry Bird as head coach and veteran all-star Chris Mullin) with Davis playing in 82 games for the third year in a row while starting 12 of them and averaging 9.6 points a game and 6.8 rebounds a game, in the postseason the Pacers defeated the Shawn Kemp-led Cleveland Cavaliers and Ewing-led New York Knicks in the first two rounds before being matched up with the Michael Jordan-led Chicago Bulls in the Eastern Conference Finals, after losing the first two games in Chicago, the Pacers responded by winning games three and four to forced a deciding game five back in Chicago, a game in which the Bulls won by a score of 106–87 to force a deciding sixth game back in Indiana, game six would be a hard-fought game in which the Pacers won by a score of 92–89 to send the series back to the United Center in Chicago for a deciding seventh game of the series, in game seven the Pacers fought and claw their way to every possession but it was not enough in the end as the eventual champion Bulls still prevailed by a score of 88–83 to win the series.

The Pacers entered the season as a heavy favorite because Michael Jordan had retired and other members of the Chicago Bulls were broken up by their management. After a four-month lockout, the Pacers won the Central Division with a record of 33 wins and 17 losses and although he was unable to break into the first team Davis still averaged 9.4 points a game, with 7.0 rebounds a game solidifying his role as rebounder shot blocker and inside scorer. In the playoffs the Pacers swept the Milwaukee Bucks in the first round, and the Philadelphia 76ers in the semifinals advancing to the Eastern Conference Finals for the second consecutive season, and for the fourth time in six seasons. Once again, the Pacers were up against the New York Knicks. Each game was nip and tuck with both teams trading wins as the Knicks won games one, three (a game best-remembered for Davis fouling Larry Johnson on a four-point play) and five while the Pacers won games two and four to set up a sixth game back at Madison Square Garden in New York. After fighting their way through most of the first three quarters the Pacers lost game six and the series to the Knicks, (marking the second year in a row and fourth overall that the Pacers lost in the Eastern Conference Finals). With a couple of Eastern Conference Finals disappointments coupled with Davis begging for more playing time, Davis announced his intentions to be traded.

=== Toronto Raptors ===
==== 1999–2000 season ====
On August 1, 1999, Davis was traded to the Toronto Raptors in exchange for the 5th pick of the 1999 NBA draft in high schooler Jonathan Bender. In the 1999–00 season he solidified his role as a starter and started almost all 79 games that he appeared in. He averaged 11.5 points, 8.8 rebounds with 1.3 blocks for the Raptors as they won 45 games and advanced to the playoffs for the first time in franchise history where they faced a strong, talented New York Knicks team now led by Ewing, Latrell Sprewell and Allan Houston in the first round. The Knicks swept the Raptors in three games, despite Davis averaging 13.0 points with 8.3 rebounds and 1.3 blocks a game.

==== 2000–2001 season ====
In the 2000–01 season, Davis had his most productive season yet, averaging 13.7 points, with 10.1 rebounds plus 1.4 blocks a game and was elected to the NBA All-Star Team for the first and only time in his career. That season the Raptors won 47 games, good enough for second place in the Central Division and advanced to the playoffs for the second year in a row, where they faced a talented Knicks team led by Sprewell and Houston and no longer featured Ewing. The Raptors defeated the Knicks in five games including a 93–89 game five victory with 14 points, 12 rebounds, and 2 blocks from Davis. In the second round, the Raptors matched up against the top-seeded Philadelphia 76ers led by league MVP Allen Iverson and defensive lynchpin Dikembe Mutombo. Every game was neck and neck with both teams trading wins in the first six games of the series, especially a game six win by the Raptors featuring a score of 101–89 with Davis scoring 17 points, grabbing 13 rebounds and blocking 2 shots despite being bothered by a strained triceps muscle in his left arm. In-game seven (a game that would prove to be the most memorable of the series), the first three quarters were nip and tuck with both teams trading leads entering the fourth quarter, and although the Raptors lost game seven to the Sixers by a score of 88–87 and the series, Davis, for the most part, enjoyed a very good series averaging 16.9 points with 11.1 rebounds and 1.8 blocks a game.

==== 2001–2002 season ====
The 2001–02 season however would be even better for Davis as he averaged his most points per game for a season yet at 14.5 points, with 9.6 rebounds and 2.0 blocks a game. Although they regressed from 47 wins from a year ago to 42, the Raptors still advanced to the playoffs for the third year in a row, where they faced their Central Division rivals (also great lakes rivals) the Detroit Pistons led by All-star Jerry Stackhouse and rebounding specialist Ben Wallace in the first round. After losing the first two games in Detroit, the Raptors responded by winning the next two games in Toronto, including a 94–84 game three victory thanks to a 30-point 8 rebound performance from Davis to send the series back to Detroit for a deciding game 5. That would prove to be the most memorable game of the series. The game was nip and tuck with both teams trading leads throughout the game and although the Raptors lost Game 5 to the Pistons by a score of 85–82 and the series, Davis enjoyed his best playoff series yet as he increased his playoff production to 17.0 points with 10.6 rebounds and 1.0 blocks a game.

==== 2002–2003 season ====
The 2002–03 season would prove to be the most difficult season for the Raptors in franchise history as they struggled with injuries all season long and sputtered to a 24–58 record, missing the playoffs for the first time since 1999 despite Davis averaging 13.9 points with 8.2 rebounds a game.

==== 2003–2004 season ====
In the 2003–04 season despite being bothered by trade rumors, Davis still averaged double-doubles for stretches of the season including 14 points with 12 rebounds in a home win against the New Jersey Nets, followed by 13 points with 12 rebounds in a home win against the Dallas Mavericks and finally 10 points with 11 rebounds in a road win against the Atlanta Hawks and his last game with the Raptors against the Orlando Magic, Davis scored 15 points and grabbed 8 rebounds in a road win against the Magic, thus ending an era of Toronto Raptors basketball in which had relied on him as a second-leading scorer, rebounder and defensive presence inside.

=== Chicago Bulls ===
That season, he was traded to the Chicago Bulls, where he fit in well as a veteran influence on a young team that included Tyson Chandler, Eddy Curry and Kirk Hinrich, although his overall averages decreased from previous years Davis continued to be relied on for his scoring, rebounding and shot-blocking and in the 2004–05 season, Davis averaged 7.0 points with 5.9 rebounds for the season as the Bulls won 47 games and advanced to the playoffs for the first time since 1998 where they faced the Washington Wizards led by Gilbert Arenas, Antawn Jamison, and Larry Hughes in the first round, the Bulls would lose to the Wizards in six games. Davis averaged 9.5 points a game with 6.8 rebounds in 6 playoff games. That summer Davis was elected the President of the NBA Players' Association at the union's annual convention on June 28, 2005.

=== New York Knicks ===
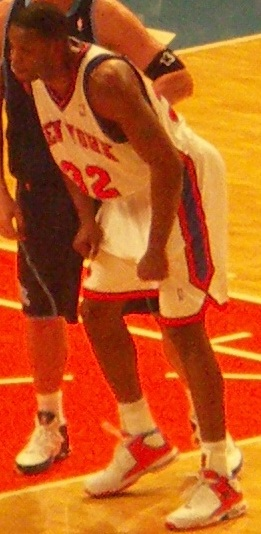
Davis with the Knicks in 2005

Just before the start of the training camp of the 2005–06 season, Davis was traded along with Curry to the New York Knicks for Michael Sweetney, Tim Thomas and Jermaine Jackson. Through 36 games with the Knicks, Davis averaged 5.0 points with 4.8 rebounds a game. Davis had a season-high of 14 rebounds along with 3 points and 1 assist in a loss against the Wizards and had 11 points and five rebounds with 2 assists and 2 steal as the Knicks defeated the Bulls by a score of 109–101, then a few weeks later he had 11 points again with 9 rebounds as the Knicks defeated the Mavericks by a score of 117–115.

==== Fan incident ====
On January 18, 2006, Davis was ejected from a Knicks-Bulls game for going into the stands and confronting a fan he alleges was intoxicated and abusive. He said he was concerned about his wife, whom he thought he had seen falling back and being touched by the fan. His wife claims that the fan was using inappropriate language around the Davis' child and that she had asked him to stop, which then prompted harassment from the fan. Though public opinion allegedly swung in Davis' favor, the NBA suspended him for five games on January 19. The fan in question, Michael Axelrod, the son of David Axelrod, the 2008 campaign manager for Barack Obama, has stated that he was attacked by Davis' wife, and his lawyer revealed plans to sue for roughly a million dollars and a public apology by the Davis family. Mr. Davis responded by stating, "I'm not apologizing to anybody for anything." On January 23, Davis and Axelrod settled their disputes outside of court, issuing the following joint statement.

"It's clear that the episode at the United Center last week, and its aftermath, evolved from some misunderstandings. This has produced regrets from all parties involved. Common sense strongly suggests that we collectively put this episode behind us and move on. That's what the Davis' and Michael Axelrod plan to do, and we hope everyone else will, as well."

=== Return to Raptors ===
On February 3, 2006, Davis was traded back to the Raptors for Jalen Rose and a first-round draft pick (from the Denver Nuggets), and an undisclosed sum of cash (believed to be around $3 million). In his first game back with the Raptors, Davis scored 7 points and grabbed 7 rebounds in an overtime loss to the San Antonio Spurs, Davis went on to start the next seven games for the Raptors before missing the next twelve with an ailing back injury. On March 23, 2006, Davis was released by the Raptors after his injury was diagnosed by the team's doctors as being season-ending.

== National team career ==
Davis played for United States national team in the 1989 Tournament of the Americas and 2002 FIBA World Championship, winning the silver medal in the 1989 event.

== NBA career statistics ==
Legend
GP	Games played	GS	Games started	MPG	Minutes per game
FG%	Field goal percentage	3P%	3-point field goal percentage	FT%	Free throw percentage
RPG	Rebounds per game	APG	Assists per game	SPG	Steals per game
BPG	Blocks per game	PPG	Points per game	**Bold**	Career high
*	Led the league

=== Regular season ===
Year	Team	GP	GS	MPG	FG%	3P%	FT%	RPG	APG	SPG	BPG	PPG
1993–94	Indiana	81	4	21.4	**.508**	.000	.642	6.2	.7	.6	1.0	7.7
1994–95	Indiana	44	1	23.4	.445	–	.672	6.4	.6	.4	.7	7.6
1995–96	Indiana	**82**	14	25.5	.490	**.500**	.713	6.1	.5	.4	.8	8.8
1996–97	Indiana	**82**	28	28.5	.480	.071	.666	7.3	.8	.5	1.0	10.5
1997–98	Indiana	**82***	12	26.7	.481	–	.696	6.8	.7	.5	.9	9.6
1998–99	Indiana	49	1	25.9	.471	–	.703	7.0	.7	.4	.9	9.4
1999–00	Toronto	79	**78**	31.4	.440	–	.765	8.8	1.3	.5	1.3	11.5
2000–01	Toronto	78	77	35.0	.433	.000	.754	**10.1**	1.4	.3	**1.9**	13.7
2001–02	Toronto	77	77	**38.7**	.426	.000	**.818**	9.6	2.0	**.7**	1.1	**14.5**
2002–03	Toronto	53	52	35.7	.407	–	.771	8.2	**2.5**	.4	1.2	13.9
2003–04	Toronto	15	15	35.9	.383	–	.755	9.5	.9	.5	.5	8.6
2003–04	Chicago	65	64	31.3	.407	–	.768	8.1	1.9	.4	.9	8.9
2004–05	Chicago	72	62	25.6	.461	–	.757	5.9	1.1	.4	.6	7.0
2005–06	New York	36	31	20.8	.428	.000	.738	4.8	.4	.6	.3	5.0
2005–06	Toronto	8	8	23.9	.452	–	.350	4.5	.9	.4	.1	4.4
Career		903	524	28.9	.448	.087	.727	7.5	1.1	.5	1.0	10.0

=== Playoffs ===
Year	Team	GP	GS	MPG	FG%	3P%	FT%	RPG	APG	SPG	BPG	PPG
1994	Indiana	16	0	25.1	.539	1.000	.561	6.6	.4	.7	1.1	8.4
1995	Indiana	**17**	0	21.6	.451	–	.627	5.7	.4	.5	.6	5.9
1996	Indiana	5	0	25.4	.520	–	**.867**	6.2	.6	.6	1.2	7.8
1998	Indiana	16	0	28.7	.462	–	.670	6.8	.9	.8	1.1	9.2
1999	Indiana	13	0	25.1	.413	–	.661	7.1	.6	.4	1.1	7.9
2000	Toronto	3	3	35.0	**.583**	–	.786	8.3	1.0	.3	1.3	13.0
2001	Toronto	12	**12**	**40.4**	.500	–	.811	**11.1**	**1.9**	**.8**	**1.8**	16.4
2002	Toronto	5	5	40.3	.453	–	.607	10.6	1.4	.4	1.0	**17.0**
2005	Chicago	6	6	28.8	.435	–	.739	6.8	1.8	.7	.7	9.5
Career		93	26	28.4	.478	1.000	.674	7.4	.9	.6	1.1	9.7

== Honors ==
In 2000, Davis won the Sears Community Service Award for his charity work.

In 2010, he was inducted into the African-American Ethnic Sports Hall of Fame.

== Personal life ==
Davis studied computer information systems in college. With his wife, Kendra, Davis has twins, named Antonio Jr. and Kaela. In 2019, through his Attorney, Antavius Weems, Davis announced that he was divorcing his wife, Kendra, stating that they both had decided to move on. In 2012, Kaela Davis committed to play basketball at Georgia Tech, and his son, Antonio Jr. ("A. J."), committed to play at the University of Tennessee. Kaela transferred to the University of South Carolina to play for Coach Dawn Staley. She was a part of the 2017 National Championship team and was drafted 10th in the 2017 WNBA draft by the Dallas Wings forgoing her last year of college eligibility. A. J. transferred to the University of Central Florida and now plays professionally overseas.

== See also ==
- Toronto Raptors accomplishments and records
