= 1997–98 Detroit Pistons season =

NBA team season

- Head coach: Doug Collins (fired); Alvin Gentry
- General manager: Rick Sund
- Owner: Bill Davidson
- Arena: The Palace of Auburn Hills

Results
- Record: 37–45 (.451)
- Place: Division: 6th (Central); Conference: 11th (Eastern)
- Playoff finish: Did not qualify
- Stats at Basketball Reference

Local media
- Television: WKBD-TV; Fox Sports Detroit

The 1997–98 Detroit Pistons season was the 50th season for the Detroit Pistons in the National Basketball Association, and their 41st season in Detroit, Michigan.

== Season summary ==
=== Off-season ===
The Pistons had the 19th overall pick in the 1997 NBA draft, and selected center Scot Pollard from the University of Kansas. During the off-season, the team signed free agents Brian Williams, and Malik Sealy; Williams previously won an NBA championship with the Chicago Bulls, who defeated the Utah Jazz in six games in the 1997 NBA Finals.

=== Regular season ===
With the addition of Brian Williams and Sealy, the Pistons won their first two games of the regular season, but then posted a five-game losing streak afterwards. The team struggled with a 6–11 start, as Joe Dumars missed ten games due to a shoulder injury during the first month of the season. In late December, the Pistons traded Theo Ratliff, and Aaron McKie to the Philadelphia 76ers in exchange for Jerry Stackhouse, and Eric Montross. At mid-season, head coach Doug Collins was fired after a 21–24 start to the season, and was replaced with assistant coach Alvin Gentry; Collins would later on get a job as a color analyst for the NBA on NBC. The Pistons held a 22–25 record at the All-Star break, and later on posted a seven-game losing streak between March and April, finishing in sixth place in the Central Division with a disappointing 37–45 record, and failing to qualify for the NBA playoffs.

Grant Hill had another stellar season, averaging 21.1 points, 7.7 rebounds, 6.8 assists and 1.8 steals per game, and was named to the All-NBA Second Team, while Brian Williams averaged 16.2 points and 8.9 rebounds per game, and Stackhouse mostly played off the bench as the team's sixth man, averaging 15.7 points per game in 57 games after the trade; Stackhouse struggled as he only shot .208 in three-point field-goal percentage. In addition, Dumars contributed 13.1 points and 3.5 assists per game, and led the Pistons with 158 three-point field goals, while Lindsey Hunter provided with 12.1 points, 3.2 assists and 1.7 steals per game. Off the bench, Sealy contributed 7.7 points per game, while second-year forward Jerome Williams averaged 5.3 points and 4.9 rebounds per game, Grant Long provided with 3.5 points and 3.8 rebounds per game, and starting power forward Don Reid contributed 3.5 points and 2.6 rebounds per game.

During the NBA All-Star weekend at Madison Square Garden in New York City, New York, Hill was selected for the 1998 NBA All-Star Game, as a member of the Eastern Conference All-Star team. Hill also finished in ninth place in Most Valuable Player voting, while Stackhouse finished in fifth place in Sixth Man of the Year voting. The Pistons finished seventh in the NBA in home-game attendance, with an attendance of 794,567 at The Palace of Auburn Hills during the regular season.

=== Aftermath ===
Following the season, Sealy signed as a free agent with the Minnesota Timberwolves, while Long re-signed with his former team, the Atlanta Hawks, and Rick Mahorn re-signed with his former team, the Philadelphia 76ers. Meanwhile, Pollard was traded to the Hawks, who soon released him to free agency; he later on signed with the Sacramento Kings during the following season.

== Draft picks ==
Round	Pick	Player	Position	Nationality	College
1	19	Scot Pollard	C/PF	United States	Kansas
2	31	Charles O'Bannon	SG/SF	United States	UCLA

== Roster ==
1997–98 Detroit Pistons roster
Players

Pos.	No.	Player	Height	Weight	DOB	From
G	4	Joe Dumars	6 ft 3 in (1.91 m)	190 lb (86 kg)	1963–05–24	McNeese State
G	12	Steve Henson	5 ft 11 in (1.80 m)	177 lb (80 kg)	1968–02–02	Kansas State
F	33	Grant Hill	6 ft 8 in (2.03 m)	225 lb (102 kg)	1972–10–05	Duke
G	1	Lindsey Hunter	6 ft 2 in (1.88 m)	170 lb (77 kg)	1970–12–03	Jackson State
F	43	Grant Long	6 ft 8 in (2.03 m)	225 lb (102 kg)	1966–03–12	Eastern Michigan
C	44	Rick Mahorn	6 ft 10 in (2.08 m)	240 lb (109 kg)	1958–09–21	Hampton
C	00	Eric Montross	7 ft 0 in (2.13 m)	270 lb (122 kg)	1971–09–23	North Carolina
G	5	Charles O'Bannon	6 ft 5 in (1.96 m)	209 lb (95 kg)	1975–02–22	UCLA
C	31	Scot Pollard	6 ft 11 in (2.11 m)	265 lb (120 kg)	1975–02–12	Kansas
F	52	Don Reid	6 ft 8 in (2.03 m)	250 lb (113 kg)	1973–12–30	Georgetown
G	14	Malik Sealy	6 ft 8 in (2.03 m)	190 lb (86 kg)	1970–02–01	St. John's
G	42	Jerry Stackhouse	6 ft 6 in (1.98 m)	218 lb (99 kg)	1974–11–05	North Carolina
C	8	Brian Williams	6 ft 11 in (2.11 m)	260 lb (118 kg)	1969–04–06	Arizona
F	13	Jerome Williams	6 ft 9 in (2.06 m)	206 lb (93 kg)	1973–05–10	Georgetown

Coaches
Head coach
- Doug Collins (fired)
- Alvin Gentry
Assistant(s)
- Johnny Bach
- John Hammond
- Brian James
- Mike Abdenour (trainer)

Legend
- (DP) Unsigned draft pick
- (FA) Free agent
- (S) Suspended
- Injured

Roster
Updated: February 9, 1998

=== Roster notes ===
- Point guard Rumeal Robinson was signed by the Pistons during the off-season, only playing with the team during the preseason, and did not appear in any regular season games; he was waived on November 20, 1997.

== Regular season ==
=== Season standings ===
Central Division	W	L	PCT	GB	Home	Road	Div
y-Chicago Bulls	62	20	.756	–	37–4	25–16	21–7
x-Indiana Pacers	58	24	.707	4	32–9	26–15	19–9
x-Charlotte Hornets	51	31	.622	11	32–9	19–22	16–12
x-Atlanta Hawks	50	32	.610	12	29–12	21–20	19–9
x-Cleveland Cavaliers	47	35	.573	15	27–14	20–21	14–14
Detroit Pistons	37	45	.451	25	25–16	12–29	12–16
Milwaukee Bucks	36	46	.439	26	21–20	15–26	9–19
Toronto Raptors	16	66	.195	46	9–32	7–34	2–26

#	Eastern Conference				
#	Team	W	L	PCT	GB
1	c-Chicago Bulls	62	20	.756	–
2	y-Miami Heat	55	27	.671	7
3	x-Indiana Pacers	58	24	.707	4
4	x-Charlotte Hornets	51	31	.622	11
5	x-Atlanta Hawks	50	32	.610	12
6	x-Cleveland Cavaliers	47	35	.573	15
7	x-New York Knicks	43	39	.524	19
8	x-New Jersey Nets	43	39	.524	19
9	Washington Wizards	42	40	.512	20
10	Orlando Magic	41	41	.500	21
11	Detroit Pistons	37	45	.451	25
12	Boston Celtics	36	46	.439	26
13	Milwaukee Bucks	36	46	.439	26
14	Philadelphia 76ers	31	51	.378	31
15	Toronto Raptors	16	66	.195	46

z - clinched division title
y - clinched division title
x - clinched playoff spot

=== Game log ===
1997–98 game log
Total: 37-45 (Home: 25–16; Road: 12–29)
October: 1–0 (home: 1–0; road: 0–0)

Game	Date	Team	Score	High points	High rebounds	High assists	Location Attendance	Record
1	October 31	Washington	W 92–79	Grant Hill (25)	Grant Hill (12)	Grant Hill (8)	The Palace Of Auburn Hills; 22,076	1–0

November: 5–11 (home: 3–4; road: 2–7)

Game	Date	Team	Score	High points	High rebounds	High assists	Location Attendance	Record
2	November 2	@ New York	W 94–86	Grant Hill (34)	Grant Hill (9)	Grant Hill (5)	Madison Square Garden; 19,763	2–0
3	November 4	@ Atlanta	L 71–82	Brian Williams (16)	Brian Williams (11)	Grant Hill (5)	Georgia Dome; 13,961	2–1
4	November 5	Indiana	L 87–99	Grant Hill (29)	Brian Williams (13)	Grant Hill (8)	The Palace Of Auburn Hills; 18,241	2–2
5	November 7	Orlando	L 84–89	Malik Sealy (18)	Grant Hill (8)	Grant Hill (11)	The Palace Of Auburn Hills; 22,076	2–3
6	November 9	@ Vancouver	L 96–104 (OT)	Lindsey Hunter (23)	Grant Hill (10)	Grant Hill (14)	General Motors Place; 14,295	2–4
7	November 10	@ Portland	L 82–86	Grant Hill (21)	Theo Ratliff (11)	Grant Hill (7)	Rose Garden Arena; 20,411	2–5
8	November 12	@ Golden State	W 102–71	Lindsey Hunter (22)	B. Williams & J. Williams (9)	Grant Hill (13)	The Arena in Oakland; 10,629	3–5
9	November 13	@ Seattle	L 89–95	Grant Hill (20)	Grant Hill (12)	Hill & McKie (5)	KeyArena at Seattle Center; 17,072	3–6
10	November 15	New Jersey	W 96–88 (OT)	Lindsey Hunter (35)	Brian Williams (12)	Lindsey Hunter (5)	The Palace Of Auburn Hills; 19,191	4–6
11	November 18	@ Milwaukee	L 79–87	Brian Williams (28)	Brian Williams (10)	Grant Hill (8)	Bradley Center; 13,065	4–7
12	November 20	Portland	L 87–93	Hill & Sealy (17)	Brian Williams (14)	Grant Hill (7)	The Palace Of Auburn Hills; 16,205	4–8
13	November 22	Atlanta	W 87–85	Brian Williams (23)	Brian Williams (8)	Grant Hill (9)	The Palace Of Auburn Hills; 18,481	5–8
14	November 23	@ Boston	L 86–90	Grant Hill (21)	Grant Hill (11)	3 players tied (4)	FleetCenter; 17,070	5–9
15	November 25	@ Charlotte	L 85–90	Brian Williams (27)	Brian Williams (10)	Lindsey Hunter (6)	Charlotte Coliseum; 22,617	5–10
16	November 28	New York	W 86–78	Brian Williams (26)	Brian Williams (14)	Grant Hill (7)	The Palace Of Auburn Hills; 22,076	6–10
17	November 30	Vancouver	L 95–97	Brian Williams (26)	Brian Williams (9)	Grant Hill (8)	The Palace Of Auburn Hills; 16,030	6–11

December: 8–6 (home: 6–3; road: 2–3)

Game	Date	Team	Score	High points	High rebounds	High assists	Location Attendance	Record
18	December 3	Phoenix	W 108–103 (3OT)	Grant Hill (27)	Brian Williams (17)	Grant Hill (10)	The Palace Of Auburn Hills; 15,548	7–11
19	December 5	Seattle	L 89–94	Grant Hill (27)	Brian Williams (20)	Grant Hill (8)	The Palace Of Auburn Hills; 18,424	7–12
20	December 7	@ Toronto	W 93–83	Hill & J. Williams (20)	Jerome Williams (11)	Grant Hill (5)	SkyDome; 16,829	8–12
21	December 9	Denver	W 92–83	Brian Williams (21)	Theo Ratliff (10)	Grant Hill (10)	The Palace Of Auburn Hills; 14,856	9–12
22	December 11	New Jersey	W 103–99	Joe Dumars (22)	Brian Williams (11)	Grant Hill (9)	The Palace Of Auburn Hills; 14,365	10–12
23	December 13	Boston	W 93–77	Brian Williams (31)	Brian Williams (15)	Grant Hill (8)	The Palace Of Auburn Hills; 22,076	11–12
24	December 16	@ New York	L 78–83	Brian Williams (19)	Brian Williams (10)	Grant Hill (6)	Madison Square Garden; 19,763	11–13
25	December 17	@ New Jersey	L 101–105	Grant Hill (25)	Brian Williams (10)	Grant Hill (6)	Continental Airlines Arena; 16,028	11–14
26	December 19	@ Indiana	L 90–98	Jerry Stackhouse (33)	Brian Williams (14)	Grant Hill (7)	Market Square Arena; 14,743	11–15
27	December 20	Philadelphia	W 115–78	Jerome Williams (22)	Eric Montross (14)	Lindsey Hunter (7)	The Palace Of Auburn Hills; 22,076	12–15
28	December 22	@ Philadelphia	W 96–92	Grant Hill (22)	Grant Hill (10)	Grant Hill (8)	CoreStates Center; 16,798	13–15
29	December 26	Miami	L 74–88	Brian Williams (20)	Brian Williams (14)	Grant Hill (5)	The Palace Of Auburn Hills; 22,076	13–16
30	December 28	Minnesota	L 89–93	Grant Hill (27)	Brian Williams (16)	Grant Hill (6)	The Palace Of Auburn Hills; 19,450	13–17
31	December 30	Toronto	W 100–95	Grant Hill (29)	Brian Williams (15)	Joe Dumars (7)	The Palace Of Auburn Hills; 19,087	14–17

January: 7–7 (home: 4–3; road: 3–4)

Game	Date	Team	Score	High points	High rebounds	High assists	Location Attendance	Record
32	January 2	@ Toronto	W 91–88	Brian Williams (26)	Brian Williams (13)	Grant Hill (10)	SkyDome; 17,292	15–17
33	January 3	Chicago	L 96–105	Grant Hill (31)	Grant Hill (7)	Hill & Dumars (6)	The Palace Of Auburn Hills; 22,076	15–18
34	January 9	Golden State	W 101–72	Jerry Stackhouse (19)	Jerome Williams (12)	Grant Hill (9)	The Palace Of Auburn Hills; 18,366	16–18
35	January 11	L.A. Clippers	W 113–85	Grant Hill (33)	Malik Sealy (11)	Jerry Stackhouse (8)	The Palace Of Auburn Hills; 17,696	17–18
36	January 14	@ Indiana	L 93–100	Grant Hill (37)	Jerome Williams (8)	Grant Hill (5)	Market Square Arena; 15,826	17–19
37	January 15	Charlotte	W 95–94 (OT)	Grant Hill (30)	Brian Williams (9)	Hill & Dumars (9)	The Palace Of Auburn Hills; 16,716	18–19
38	January 19	@ Utah	L 89–98	Grant Hill (26)	Brian Williams (17)	Joe Dumars (6)	Delta Center; 19,911	18–20
39	January 21	@ Denver	W 87–67	Jerry Stackhouse (21)	Grant Hill (10)	Malik Sealy (7)	McNichols Sports Arena; 10,821	19–20
40	January 22	@ L.A. Clippers	W 94–76	Grant Hill (35)	Grant Long (10)	Grant Hill (4)	Arrowhead Pond; 12,677	20–20
41	January 24	New York	L 92–99	Jerry Stackhouse (35)	Brian Williams (10)	Grant Hill (7)	The Palace Of Auburn Hills; 22,076	20–21
42	January 27	@ Milwaukee	L 81–83	Joe Dumars (20)	Grant Hill (13)	Grant Hill (6)	Bradley Center; 13,389	20–22
43	January 28	Orlando	W 91–86	Grant Hill (29)	Grant Hill (12)	Grant Hill (6)	The Palace Of Auburn Hills; 17,473	21–22
44	January 30	Washington	L 95–102	Grant Hill (28)	Hill & J. Williams (10)	Grant Hill (5)	The Palace Of Auburn Hills; 22,076	21–23
45	January 31	@ Cleveland	L 88–90	Grant Hill (19)	Grant Hill (10)	Grant Hill (7)	Gund Arena; 20,562	21–24

February: 5–6 (home: 4–1; road: 1–5)

Game	Date	Team	Score	High points	High rebounds	High assists	Location Attendance	Record
46	February 2	@ Washington	L 101–113	Jerry Stackhouse (22)	Grant Hill (10)	Joe Dumars (6)	MCI Center; 20,124	21–25
47	February 5	Houston	W 104–92	Grant Hill (24)	Brian Williams (11)	Joe Dumars (10)	The Palace Of Auburn Hills; 17,534	22–25
All-Star Break
48	February 11	Milwaukee	W 95–83	Grant Hill (21)	Grant Hill (6)	Grant Hill (9)	The Palace Of Auburn Hills; 17,534	23–25
49	February 13	@ Miami	L 86–100	Grant Hill (22)	Brian Williams (16)	Grant Hill (5)	Miami Arena; 15,200	23–26
50	February 15	@ Chicago	L 90–99	Lindsey Hunter (31)	Hill & J. Williams (9)	Grant Hill (13)	United Center; 24,139	23–27
51	February 17	@ San Antonio	L 94–95	Joe Dumars (21)	Hunter & Pollard (5)	Grant Hill (12)	Alamodome; 14,474	23–28
52	February 19	@ Houston	L 90–100	Joe Dumars (19)	Eric Montross (8)	Grant Hill (5)	The Summit; 16,285	23–29
53	February 21	@ Dallas	W 94–82	Brian Williams (19)	Brian Williams (9)	Grant Hill (6)	Reunion Arena; 18,042	24–29
54	February 23	Sacramento	W 111–85	Grant Hill (28)	Grant Hill (13)	Lindsey Hunter (7)	The Palace Of Auburn Hills; 16,228	25–29
55	February 25	Charlotte	L 88–98	Grant Hill (27)	Rick Mahorn (12)	Grant Hill (7)	The Palace Of Auburn Hills; 17,477	25–30
56	February 27	Cleveland	W 90–87	B. Williams & J. Williams (17)	Jerome Williams (12)	Grant Hill (7)	The Palace Of Auburn Hills; 22,076	26–30

March: 8–9 (home: 5–2; road: 3–7)

Game	Date	Team	Score	High points	High rebounds	High assists	Location Attendance	Record
57	March 1	@ Minnesota	L 113–115 (2OT)	Joe Dumars (28)	Brian Williams (12)	Hunter & Hill (9)	Target Center; 18,651	26–31
58	March 2	Dallas	W 100–94	Grant Hill (35)	Jerome Williams (14)	Joe Dumars (7)	The Palace Of Auburn Hills; 15,682	27–31
59	March 4	@ Sacramento	L 89–109	Grant Hill (22)	Brian Williams (10)	Grant Hill (3)	ARCO Arena; 14,772	27–32
60	March 5	@ Phoenix	L 93–102	Joe Dumars (20)	Grant Hill (7)	Hill & Hunter (5)	America West Arena; 19,023	27–33
61	March 8	@ L.A. Lakers	L 89–96	Jerry Stackhouse (23)	Grant Hill (12)	Hill & Hunter (6)	Great Western Forum; 17,505	27–34
62	March 11	Indiana	W 122–91	Grant Hill (23)	Grant Hill (12)	Grant Hill (5)	The Palace Of Auburn Hills; 20,987	28–34
63	March 13	@ Boston	W 96–92	Hill & Stackhouse (19)	B. Williams & J. Williams (8)	Lindsey Hunter (4)	FleetCenter; 18,624	29–34
64	March 15	Utah	L 98–109	Grant Hill (29)	Brian Williams (14)	Jerry Stackhouse (6)	The Palace Of Auburn Hills; 22,076	29–35
65	March 16	@ Miami	W 103–90	Grant Hill (26)	Brian Williams (10)	Hill & Hunter (3)	Miami Arena; 14,783	30–35
66	March 18	Philadelphia	L 96–104	Grant Hill (31)	Hill & B. Williams (9)	Grant Hill (6)	The Palace Of Auburn Hills; 18,310	30–36
67	March 20	Toronto	W 105–99	Grant Hill (25)	Brian Williams (18)	B. Williams & Hill (5)	The Palace Of Auburn Hills; 22,076	31–36
68	March 22	Atlanta	W 105–98	Grant Hill (24)	Brian Williams (9)	Grant Hill (11)	The Palace Of Auburn Hills; 22,076	32–36
69	March 23	@ Philadelphia	W 94–79	Joe Dumars (20)	Brian Williams (13)	Hill & Dumars (5)	CoreStates Center; 14,294	33–36
70	March 25	San Antonio	W 103–94	Grant Hill (24)	Hill & J. Williams (7)	Grant Hill (10)	The Palace Of Auburn Hills; 18,862	34–36
71	March 27	@ Cleveland	L 87–88 (OT)	Jerry Stackhouse (26)	Brian Williams (12)	Stackhouse & Dumars (6)	Gund Arena; 19,105	34–37
72	March 29	@ Atlanta	L 95–118	Brian Williams (22)	B. Williams & J. Williams (8)	3 players tied (3)	Georgia Dome; 24,693	34–38
73	March 31	@ Chicago	L 101–106 (OT)	Grant Hill (37)	Brian Williams (13)	Jerry Stackhouse (7)	United Center; 23,942	34–39

April: 3–6 (home: 2–3; road: 1–3)

Game	Date	Team	Score	High points	High rebounds	High assists	Location Attendance	Record
74	April 1	Cleveland	L 90–92	Lindsey Hunter (17)	Brian Williams (8)	Grant Hill (10)	The Palace Of Auburn Hills; 17,846	34–40
75	April 3	Boston	L 100–101	Brian Williams (29)	Jerome Williams (9)	Hill & Dumars (7)	The Palace Of Auburn Hills; 22,076	34–41
76	April 5	L.A. Lakers	L 103–105 (OT)	Brian Williams (26)	Grant Hill (16)	Grant Hill (12)	The Palace Of Auburn Hills; 22,076	34–42
77	April 8	@ Orlando	L 87–95	Lindsey Hunter (20)	Don Reid (15)	Grant Hill (9)	Orlando Arena; 17,248	34–43
78	April 9	@ Washington	W 102–83	Joe Dumars (33)	Grant Hill (9)	Lindsey Hunter (8)	MCI Center; 20,674	35–43
79	April 12	@ Charlotte	L 86–88	Joe Dumars (20)	Grant Hill (13)	Grant Hill (10)	Charlotte Coliseum; 24,042	35–44
80	April 15	Chicago	W 87–79	Brian Williams (25)	Brian Williams (17)	Grant Hill (12)	The Palace Of Auburn Hills; 22,076	36–44
81	April 17	Milwaukee	W 108–102	Grant Hill (31)	Grant Hill (12)	Grant Hill (9)	The Palace Of Auburn Hills; 22,076	37–44
82	April 19	@ New Jersey	L 101–114	Grant Hill (21)	Grant Hill (12)	Hill & Stackhouse (7)	Continental Airlines Arena; 20,049	37–45

1997–98 schedule

== Player statistics ==
Legend
GP	Games played	GS	Games started	MPG	Minutes per game
FG%	Field-goal percentage	3P%	3-point field-goal percentage	FT%	Free-throw percentage
RPG	Rebounds per game	APG	Assists per game	SPG	Steals per game
BPG	Blocks per game	PPG	Points per game

Player	GP	GS	MPG	FG%	3P%	FT%	RPG	APG	SPG	BPG	PPG
Joe Dumars	72	72	32.3	.416	.371	.825	1.4	3.5	0.6	0.0	13.1
Steve Henson	23	0	2.8	.500	.375	1.000	0.1	0.2	0.0	0.0	1.6
Grant Hill	81	81	40.7	.452	.143	.740	7.7	6.8	1.8	0.7	21.1
Lindsey Hunter	71	67	35.3	.383	.321	.740	3.5	3.2	1.7	0.1	12.1
Grant Long	40	17	18.5	.427	.000	.719	3.8	0.6	0.7	0.3	3.5
Rick Mahorn	59	0	12.0	.457	—	.676	3.3	0.3	0.2	0.1	2.4
Aaron McKie	24	1	19.7	.413	.176	.870	2.8	1.6	1.0	0.0	4.5
Eric Montross	28	10	12.6	.456	—	.429	3.8	0.1	0.2	0.5	2.5
Charles O'Bannon	30	0	7.8	.377	.000	.800	1.1	0.6	0.3	0.0	2.1
Scot Pollard	33	0	9.6	.500	—	.826	2.2	0.3	0.2	0.3	2.7
Theo Ratliff	24	12	24.4	.514	—	.683	5.0	0.6	0.5	2.3	6.5
Don Reid	68	44	14.6	.534	—	.704	2.6	0.4	0.4	0.8	3.5
Malik Sealy	77	10	21.3	.428	.220	.824	2.8	1.3	0.8	0.3	7.7
Jerry Stackhouse	57	15	31.5	.428	.208	.782	3.3	3.1	1.0	0.7	15.7
Brian Williams	78	78	33.6	.511	.333	.707	8.9	1.2	0.9	0.7	16.2
Jerome Williams	77	3	16.9	.524	.000	.651	4.9	0.6	0.7	0.1	5.3

Player statistics citation:

== Awards and records ==
- Grant Hill, All-NBA Second Team

== Transactions ==
- August 7, 1997: Acquired the 2003 1st Round Draft Pick (Darko Miličić) from the Vancouver Grizzlies for Otis Thorpe
- August 16, 1997: Signed Brian Williams
- October 9, 1997: Waived Randolph Childress
- October 25, 1997: Signed Malik Sealy
- December 18, 1997: Acquired Jerry Stackhouse, Eric Montross and a 2005 2nd Round Draft Pick (Alex Acker) from the Philadelphia 76ers for Aaron McKie, Theo Ratliff and a 2003 1st Round Draft Pick (Carlos Delfino)
- January 17, 1998: Signed Steve Henson to the first of two 10-day contracts
- February 9, 1998: Signed Steve Henson for the remainder of the season

Player transactions citation:

== See also ==
- 1997-98 NBA season
