= 1997–98 New York Knicks season =

Season of National Basketball Association team the New York Knicks

- Head coach: Jeff Van Gundy
- General manager: Ernie Grunfeld
- Owners: Cablevision
- Arena: Madison Square Garden

Results
- Record: 43–39 (.524)
- Place: Division: 2nd (Atlantic); Conference: 7th (Eastern)
- Playoff finish: Conference semifinals (lost to Pacers 1–4)
- Stats at Basketball Reference

Local media
- Television: MSG Network
- Radio: WFAN

The 1997–98 New York Knicks season was the 52nd season for the Knicks in the National Basketball Association. The city of New York City, New York hosted the NBA All-Star weekend at Madison Square Garden this season, which featured the 1998 NBA All-Star Game.

== Season summary ==
=== Off-season ===
During the off-season, the Knicks acquired Chris Mills from the Boston Celtics, and acquired Chris Dudley from the Portland Trail Blazers in a three-team trade.

For the season, the Knicks redesigned their white home uniforms, which featured a V-shaped collar, a blue, orange and black trim, and blue side panels with orange and black outlines on their jerseys and shorts; their shorts also featured the jersey number on the left leg, and the team's primary logo on the right leg. Meanwhile, the team's blue alternate uniforms with black side panels, which they wore on the road frequently for the previous two seasons, became their primary road jerseys starting this season.

Both uniforms would remain in use until 2012, although they were slightly redesigned in 2001, where the side panels were removed from the bottom of their shorts; in addition, the jersey number and the team's primary logo were removed from the left and right legs of their shorts, respectively, as the primary logo was added to the left leg.

=== Regular season ===
In the regular season, and with the addition of Mills and Dudley, the Knicks won 9 of their first 13 games, and later on held a 25–21 record at the All-Star break. At mid-season, the team traded Herb Williams to the Philadelphia 76ers in exchange for former All-Star forward Terry Cummings; however, Williams never played for the 76ers, and was re-signed by the Knicks for the remainder of the season. The Knicks lost eight of their final eleven games of the season, and finished with a 43–39 record, which placed them in a tie for second place in the Atlantic Division with the New Jersey Nets, and earned them the seventh seed in the Eastern Conference; it was their lowest winning percentage since the 1990–91 season. The Knicks qualified for the NBA playoffs for the eleventh consecutive year, and also had the fourth-best team defensive rating in the NBA.

This season saw All-Star center Patrick Ewing break his right wrist during a road game against the Milwaukee Bucks at the Bradley Center on December 20, 1997. Late in the second quarter, Ewing was trying to catch an alley-oop pass from teammate Charlie Ward, where he was fouled by Bucks center Andrew Lang, and landed on his tailbone. The injury kept Ewing out for the remainder of the regular season, as he averaged 20.8 points, 10.2 rebounds and 2.2 blocks per game in 26 games.

Without their star center for most of the season, Allan Houston finished second on the team in scoring, averaging 18.4 points per game, while Larry Johnson averaged 15.5 points and 5.7 rebounds per game, and sixth man John Starks provided scoring off the bench, averaging 12.9 points per game and leading the Knicks with 130 three-point field goals. In addition, Charles Oakley provided the team with 9.0 points and 9.2 rebounds per game, and was named to the NBA All-Defensive Second Team, while Mills contributed 9.7 points and 5.1 rebounds per game off the bench, and Cummings averaged 7.8 points and 4.5 rebounds per game in 30 games after the trade. Meanwhile, the team also used Ward as its starting point guard, with Chris Childs coming off the bench; Ward contributed 7.8 points, 5.7 assists and 1.8 steals per game, and Childs provided the Knicks with 6.3 points and 3.9 assists per game. On the defensive side, Buck Williams averaged 4.9 points and 4.5 rebounds per game in 41 games, and Dudley contributed 3.1 points, 5.4 rebounds and 1.0 blocks per game in 51 games.

During the NBA All-Star weekend at Madison Square Garden in New York City, Houston participated in the inaugural NBA 2Ball Competition, along with Rebecca Lobo of the WNBA's New York Liberty, while Ward participated in the NBA Three-Point Shootout. The 2Ball Competition replaced the NBA Slam Dunk Contest this season. Due to his wrist injury, Ewing was not selected for the NBA All-Star Game; Ewing received 441,347 votes from the fans in balloting as the starting center for the Eastern Conference All-Star team, but lost the spot to All-Star center Dikembe Mutombo of the Atlanta Hawks, who received 476,432 votes. Starks finished in fourth place in Sixth Man of the Year voting, while head coach Jeff Van Gundy finished tied in ninth place in Coach of the Year voting.

The Knicks finished fifth in the NBA in home-game attendance, with an attendance of 810,283 at Madison Square Garden during the regular season.

=== NBA playoffs ===
In the Eastern Conference First Round of the 1998 NBA playoffs, and for the second consecutive year, the Knicks faced off against the 2nd–seeded, and Atlantic Division champion Miami Heat, who were led by All-Star guard Tim Hardaway, Alonzo Mourning and Jamal Mashburn. The Heat had eliminated the Knicks in the 1997 NBA playoffs, in a full seven-game second-round series that featured a brawl during Game 5; the altercation led to the suspension of six players, including five from the Knicks. With Ewing out for the 1998 series due to his wrist injury, the Heat took a 2–1 series lead over the Knicks, defeating them in Game 3 at Madison Square Garden, 91–85.

In Game 4 at Madison Square Garden, which the Knicks won by a score of 90–85, to even the series at two games each, another brawl occurred in the closing seconds. Johnson and Mourning, both former teammates on the Charlotte Hornets, exchanged punches, and Van Gundy clung to one of Mourning's legs at one point in an attempt to separate the two. Three players were suspended for Game 5: Johnson and Mourning were both suspended for two games, and Mills, who left the bench during the fight, was suspended for one game. Despite the loss of Johnson and Mills, the Knicks won Game 5 over the Heat on the road, 98–81 at the Miami Arena to win the series in five hard-fought games, and advance to the Eastern Conference Semi-finals.

In the Semi-finals, the Knicks faced off against the 3rd–seeded Indiana Pacers, who were led by All-Star guard Reggie Miller, All-Star center Rik Smits, and Chris Mullin. Ewing returned to play in Game 2, in which the Knicks lost to the Pacers on the road, 85–77 at the Market Square Arena, as the Pacers took a 2–0 series lead. The Knicks won Game 3 at Madison Square Garden, 83–76, but then lost Game 4 to the Pacers at home in overtime, 118–107. The Knicks lost Game 5 to the Pacers at the Market Square Arena, 99–88, thus losing the series in five games.

=== Aftermath ===
Following the season, Oakley was traded to the Toronto Raptors after ten seasons with the Knicks, while Starks, Mills and Cummings were all traded to the Golden State Warriors, who Starks had previously played for during the 1988–89 season. Meanwhile, Buck Williams retired after seventeen seasons in the NBA.

== NBA draft ==
| Round | Pick | Player | Position | Nationality | School/Club team |
|---|---|---|---|---|---|
| 1 | 25 | John Thomas | PF | United States | Minnesota |

== Roster ==
1997–98 New York Knicks roster
Players

| Pos. | No. | Player | Height | Weight | DOB | From |
|---|---|---|---|---|---|---|
| G | 13 | Anthony Bowie | 6 ft 6 in (1.98 m) | 190 lb (86 kg) | 1963–11–09 | Oklahoma |
| G | 1 | Chris Childs | 6 ft 3 in (1.91 m) | 195 lb (88 kg) | 1970–11–20 | Boise State |
| F | 35 | Terry Cummings | 6 ft 9 in (2.06 m) | 220 lb (100 kg) | 1961–03–15 | DePaul |
| F | 4 | Ben Davis (injured) | 6 ft 9 in (2.06 m) | 240 lb (109 kg) | 1972–12–26 | Arizona |
| C | 14 | Chris Dudley | 6 ft 11 in (2.11 m) | 235 lb (107 kg) | 1965–02–22 | Yale |
| C | 33 | Patrick Ewing | 7 ft 0 in (2.13 m) | 240 lb (109 kg) | 1962–08–05 | Georgetown |
| G | 20 | Allan Houston | 6 ft 6 in (1.98 m) | 200 lb (91 kg) | 1971–04–20 | Tennessee |
| F | 2 | Larry Johnson | 6 ft 6 in (1.98 m) | 250 lb (113 kg) | 1969–03–14 | UNLV |
| F | 42 | Chris Mills | 6 ft 6 in (1.98 m) | 215 lb (98 kg) | 1970–01–25 | Arizona |
| F | 34 | Charles Oakley | 6 ft 8 in (2.03 m) | 225 lb (102 kg) | 1963–12–18 | Virginia Union |
| G | 3 | John Starks | 6 ft 3 in (1.91 m) | 180 lb (82 kg) | 1965–08–10 | Oklahoma State |
| G | 7 | Brooks Thompson | 6 ft 4 in (1.93 m) | 193 lb (88 kg) | 1970–07–19 | Oklahoma State |
| G | 21 | Charlie Ward | 6 ft 2 in (1.88 m) | 190 lb (86 kg) | 1970–10–12 | Florida State |
| F | 52 | Buck Williams | 6 ft 8 in (2.03 m) | 215 lb (98 kg) | 1960–03–08 | Maryland |
| C | 32 | Herb Williams | 6 ft 10 in (2.08 m) | 242 lb (110 kg) | 1958–02–16 | Ohio State |

Coaches
Head coach
- Jeff Van Gundy
Assistant(s)
- Greg Brittenham
- Don Chaney
- Brendan Malone
- Jeff Nix
- Tom Thibodeau

Legend
- (DP) Unsigned draft pick
- (FA) Free agent
- (S) Suspended
- Injured

Roster

=== Roster notes ===
- Center Herb Williams was traded to the Philadelphia 76ers at mid-season, but did not play for them, and was re-signed by the Knicks for the remainder of the regular season.

== Regular season ==
=== Season standings ===
| Atlantic Division | W | L | PCT | GB | Home | Road | Div |
|---|---|---|---|---|---|---|---|
| y-Miami Heat | 55 | 27 | .671 | – | 30-11 | 25–16 | 18–6 |
| x-New York Knicks | 43 | 39 | .524 | 12 | 28–13 | 15–26 | 13–11 |
| x-New Jersey Nets | 43 | 39 | .524 | 12 | 26–15 | 17–24 | 12–12 |
| Washington Wizards | 42 | 40 | .512 | 13 | 24–17 | 18–23 | 12–13 |
| Orlando Magic | 41 | 41 | .500 | 14 | 24–17 | 17–24 | 11–13 |
| Boston Celtics | 36 | 46 | .439 | 19 | 24–17 | 12–29 | 12–12 |
| Philadelphia 76ers | 31 | 51 | .378 | 24 | 19–22 | 12–29 | 7–17 |

| # | Eastern Conference | | | | |
| # | Team | W | L | PCT | GB |
|---|---|---|---|---|---|
| 1 | c-Chicago Bulls | 62 | 20 | .756 | – |
| 2 | y-Miami Heat | 55 | 27 | .671 | 7 |
| 3 | x-Indiana Pacers | 58 | 24 | .707 | 4 |
| 4 | x-Charlotte Hornets | 51 | 31 | .622 | 11 |
| 5 | x-Atlanta Hawks | 50 | 32 | .610 | 12 |
| 6 | x-Cleveland Cavaliers | 47 | 35 | .573 | 15 |
| 7 | x-New York Knicks | 43 | 39 | .524 | 19 |
| 8 | x-New Jersey Nets | 43 | 39 | .524 | 19 |
| 9 | Washington Wizards | 42 | 40 | .512 | 20 |
| 10 | Orlando Magic | 41 | 41 | .500 | 21 |
| 11 | Detroit Pistons | 37 | 45 | .451 | 25 |
| 12 | Boston Celtics | 36 | 46 | .439 | 26 |
| 13 | Milwaukee Bucks | 36 | 46 | .439 | 26 |
| 14 | Philadelphia 76ers | 31 | 51 | .378 | 31 |
| 15 | Toronto Raptors | 16 | 66 | .195 | 46 |

== Playoffs ==
1998 playoff game log
First Round: 3–2 (home: 1–1; road: 2–1)

| Game | Date | Team | Score | High points | High rebounds | High assists | Location Attendance | Series |
|---|---|---|---|---|---|---|---|---|
| 1 | April 24 | @ Miami | L 79–94 | Larry Johnson (21) | Charles Oakley (12) | Charles Oakley (4) | Miami Arena; 15,200 | 0–1 |
| 2 | April 26 | @ Miami | W 96–86 | John Starks (25) | Terry Cummings (14) | Charlie Ward (7) | Miami Arena; 15,200 | 1–1 |
| 3 | April 28 | Miami | L 85–91 | Allan Houston (27) | Johnson, Oakley (7) | four players tied (3) | Madison Square Garden; 19,763 | 1–2 |
| 4 | April 30 | Miami | W 90–85 | Houston, Johnson (18) | Larry Johnson (9) | Charlie Ward (7) | Madison Square Garden; 19,763 | 2–2 |
| 5 | May 3 | @ Miami | W 98–81 | Allan Houston (30) | Buck Williams (14) | Charlie Ward (14) | Miami Arena; 15,200 | 3–2 |

Conference semifinals: 1–4 (home: 1–1; road: 0–3)

| Game | Date | Team | Score | High points | High rebounds | High assists | Location Attendance | Series |
|---|---|---|---|---|---|---|---|---|
| 1 | May 5 | @ Indiana | L 83–93 | John Starks (17) | Charles Oakley (11) | Charlie Ward (6) | Market Square Arena; 16,630 | 0–1 |
| 2 | May 7 | @ Indiana | L 77–85 | John Starks (20) | Charles Oakley (9) | Charlie Ward (10) | Market Square Arena; 16,765 | 0–2 |
| 3 | May 9 | Indiana | W 83–76 | Patrick Ewing (19) | Chris Mills (8) | Chris Childs (5) | Madison Square Garden; 19,763 | 1–2 |
| 4 | May 10 | Indiana | L 107–118 (OT) | Houston, Starks (19) | Charles Oakley (10) | Chris Childs (6) | Madison Square Garden; 19,763 | 1–3 |
| 5 | May 13 | @ Indiana | L 88–99 | Allan Houston (33) | Patrick Ewing (7) | Patrick Ewing (11) | Market Square Arena; 16,767 | 1–4 |

1998 schedule

== Player statistics ==
Legend
| GP | Games played | GS | Games started | MPG | Minutes per game |
| FG% | Field-goal percentage | 3P% | 3-point field-goal percentage | FT% | Free-throw percentage |
| RPG | Rebounds per game | APG | Assists per game | SPG | Steals per game |
| BPG | Blocks per game | PPG | Points per game |

=== Regular season ===
| Player | GP | GS | MPG | FG% | 3P% | FT% | RPG | APG | SPG | BPG | PPG |
|---|---|---|---|---|---|---|---|---|---|---|---|
| Anthony Bowie | 27 | 3 | 8.3 | .542 | .750 | .889 | 1.0 | .4 | .2 | .1 | 2.8 |
| Chris Childs | 68 | 0 | 23.5 | .421 | .310 | .825 | 2.4 | 3.9 | .8 | .1 | 6.3 |
| Terry Cummings^{†} | 30 | 1 | 17.6 | .477 | | .700 | 4.5 | .9 | .5 | .2 | 7.8 |
| Ben Davis | 7 | 0 | 1.9 | .200 | | | .9 | .0 | .1 | .0 | .6 |
| Chris Dudley | 51 | 22 | 16.8 | .406 | | .446 | 5.4 | .4 | .3 | 1.0 | 3.1 |
| Patrick Ewing | 26 | 26 | 32.6 | .504 | .000 | .720 | 10.2 | 1.1 | .6 | 2.2 | 20.8 |
| Allan Houston | 82 | 82 | 34.7 | .447 | .385 | .851 | 3.3 | 2.6 | .8 | .3 | 18.4 |
| Larry Johnson | 70 | 70 | 34.5 | .485 | .238 | .756 | 5.7 | 2.1 | .6 | .2 | 15.5 |
| Chris Mills | 80 | 29 | 27.3 | .433 | .292 | .804 | 5.1 | 1.7 | .6 | .4 | 9.7 |
| Pete Myers | 9 | 0 | 4.4 | .500 | | .667 | 1.1 | .3 | .4 | .0 | 1.6 |
| Charles Oakley | 79 | 79 | 34.6 | .440 | .000 | .851 | 9.2 | 2.5 | 1.6 | .3 | 9.0 |
| John Starks | 82 | 10 | 26.7 | .393 | .327 | .787 | 2.8 | 2.7 | 1.0 | .1 | 12.9 |
| Brooks Thompson^{†} | 17 | 0 | 7.1 | .448 | .286 | .600 | .6 | 1.4 | .4 | .1 | 1.9 |
| Charlie Ward | 82 | 82 | 28.3 | .455 | .377 | .805 | 3.3 | 5.7 | 1.8 | .5 | 7.8 |
| Buck Williams | 41 | 6 | 18.0 | .503 | | .732 | 4.5 | .5 | .4 | .4 | 4.9 |
| Herb Williams | 27 | 0 | 6.6 | .419 | | .125 | 1.1 | .1 | .2 | .3 | 1.4 |

=== Playoffs ===
| Player | GP | GS | MPG | FG% | 3P% | FT% | RPG | APG | SPG | BPG | PPG |
|---|---|---|---|---|---|---|---|---|---|---|---|
| Anthony Bowie | 7 | 0 | 3.3 | .500 | | | .0 | .1 | .1 | .0 | .6 |
| Chris Childs | 10 | 0 | 25.4 | .414 | .308 | .733 | 2.5 | 3.3 | .6 | .0 | 6.3 |
| Terry Cummings | 8 | 1 | 15.0 | .441 | | .250 | 4.4 | .6 | .5 | .3 | 4.0 |
| Chris Dudley | 6 | 3 | 8.8 | .333 | | .500 | 3.0 | .0 | .3 | .2 | 1.3 |
| Patrick Ewing | 4 | 4 | 33.0 | .357 | | .593 | 8.0 | 1.3 | .8 | 1.3 | 14.0 |
| Allan Houston | 10 | 10 | 40.3 | .434 | .391 | .862 | 3.8 | 2.8 | .5 | .1 | 21.1 |
| Larry Johnson | 8 | 8 | 38.8 | .486 | .200 | .740 | 6.6 | 1.6 | 1.3 | .4 | 17.9 |
| Chris Mills | 9 | 2 | 18.7 | .429 | .400 | .833 | 3.0 | .6 | .9 | .2 | 4.9 |
| Charles Oakley | 10 | 10 | 34.2 | .408 | | .920 | 8.5 | 1.4 | 1.1 | .2 | 8.1 |
| John Starks | 10 | 2 | 31.4 | .472 | .424 | .875 | 4.0 | 2.3 | 1.6 | .1 | 16.4 |
| Charlie Ward | 10 | 10 | 26.1 | .418 | .429 | .688 | 2.8 | 6.0 | 2.0 | .2 | 6.6 |
| Buck Williams | 3 | 0 | 15.0 | .444 | | .750 | 5.3 | .3 | .0 | .3 | 4.7 |

- ^{†} Denotes player spent time with another team in the season. Stats reflect time with the Knicks only.

Player statistics citation:

== Awards and records ==
- Charles Oakley, NBA All-Defensive Second Team
