= 1997–98 Cleveland Cavaliers season =

NBA professional basketball team season

- Head coach: Mike Fratello
- General manager: Wayne Embry
- Owners: Gordon Gund; George Gund III
- Arena: Gund Arena

Results
- Record: 47–35 (.573)
- Place: Division: 5th (Central); Conference: 6th (Eastern)
- Playoff finish: First round (lost to Pacers 1–3)
- Stats at Basketball Reference

Local media
- Television: SportsChannel/Fox Sports Ohio; WUAB
- Radio: WTAM

The 1997–98 Cleveland Cavaliers season was the 28th season for the Cleveland Cavaliers in the National Basketball Association.

== Season summary ==
=== Off-season ===
In the 1997 NBA draft, the Cavaliers selected shooting guard Derek Anderson from the University of Kentucky with the 13th overall pick, selected point guard Brevin Knight out of Stanford University with the 16th overall pick, and selected small forward Cedric Henderson from the University of Memphis with the 45th overall pick. Lithuanian rookie center Zydrunas Ilgauskas, who was drafted by the Cavaliers as the 20th overall pick in the 1996 NBA draft, but missed all of the previous season due to a foot injury, made his debut in the NBA this season. During the off-season, the team acquired All-Star forward Shawn Kemp from the Seattle SuperSonics in a three-team trade, acquired Wesley Person from the Phoenix Suns in another three-team trade, and signed free agent Mitchell Butler.

For the season, the Cavaliers slightly updated their home and road uniforms; the uniforms still featured the controversial light blue splash across their jerseys, but were removed from their shorts and replaced with a much smaller light blue splash on the bottom of the left leg. The team nickname "Cavs" was changed from orange to black with orange inlines on their white home uniforms, while the city name "Cleveland" was changed from orange to white with orange inlines on their black road uniforms; both uniforms featured the team's primary logo of a basketball going into a net on the right leg of their shorts. The team's updated uniforms would remain in use until 1999.

=== Regular season ===
With the addition of Kemp, Person, Ilgauskas and Knight, the Cavaliers struggled with a 4–6 start to the regular season, as Bob Sura only played just 46 games due to an ankle injury, and Butler was out for the remainder of the season due to a neck injury after 18 games. In December, the team signed free agent Scott Brooks. However, the Cavaliers posted a 10-game winning streak between November and December afterwards, and later on held a 27–20 record at the All-Star break. The Cavaliers played above .500 in winning percentage for the remainder of the season, finishing in fifth place in the Central Division with a 47–35 record, earning the sixth seed in the Eastern Conference, and qualifying for the NBA playoffs after a one-year absence. The Cavaliers had the best team defensive rating in the NBA.

Kemp averaged 18.0 points, 9.3 rebounds and 1.4 steals per game, but only shot .445 in field-goal percentage, while Person averaged 14.7 points and 1.6 steals per game, and also led the league with 192 three-point field goals, and Ilgauskas provided the team with 13.9 points, 8.8 rebounds and 1.6 blocks per game. In addition, Anderson played a sixth man role off the bench, averaging 11.7 points and 1.3 steals per game in 66 games due to a knee injury, while Henderson provided with 10.1 points and 4.0 rebounds per game, and Knight contributed 9.0 points, 8.2 assists and 2.5 steals per game. Off the bench, second-year center Vitaly Potapenko averaged 7.1 points and 3.9 rebounds per game, while Sura provided with 5.8 points and 3.7 assists per game, and Ferry contributed 4.2 points per game. Ilgauskas and Knight were both named to the NBA All-Rookie First Team, while Anderson and Henderson were both named the NBA All-Rookie Second Team.

During the NBA All-Star weekend at Madison Square Garden in New York City, New York, Kemp was selected for the 1998 NBA All-Star Game, as a member of the Eastern Conference All-Star team; it was his sixth and final All-Star appearance. Meanwhile, Ilgauskas, Knight, Henderson and Anderson were all selected for the NBA Rookie Game, as members of the Eastern Conference Rookie team, although Anderson did not participate due to injury. Ilgauskas scored 18 points along with 7 rebounds and 2 blocks, and was named the Rookie Game's Most Valuable Player, as the Eastern Conference defeated the Western Conference, 85–80. In addition, Person participated in the inaugural NBA 2Ball Competition, along with Michelle Edwards of the WNBA's Cleveland Rockers. Knight finished tied in eleventh place in Defensive Player of the Year voting, while head coach Mike Fratello finished in third place in Coach of the Year voting.

The Cavaliers finished 14th in the NBA in home-game attendance, with an attendance of 694,629 at the Gund Arena during the regular season.

=== NBA playoffs ===
In the Eastern Conference First Round of the 1998 NBA playoffs, the Cavaliers faced off against the 3rd–seeded Indiana Pacers, who were led by All-Star guard Reggie Miller, All-Star center Rik Smits, and Chris Mullin. The Cavaliers lost the first two games to the Pacers on the road at the Market Square Arena, but managed to win Game 3 at home, 86–77 at the Gund Arena. However, the Cavaliers lost Game 4 to the Pacers at home, 80–74, thus losing the series in four games.

This would also be the team's final NBA playoff appearance until the 2005–06 season, as what would follow was a seven-year playoff drought.

=== Aftermath ===
Following the season, Brooks was released to free agency. Until the 2022–23 season, this was the final season in which the Cavaliers qualified for the NBA playoffs without future All-Star LeBron James, who was selected by the team as the first overall pick in the 2003 NBA draft.

== Draft picks ==
Round	Pick	Player	Position	Nationality	School/Club team
1	13	Derek Anderson	SG	United States	Kentucky
1	16^{*}	Brevin Knight	PG	United States	Stanford
2	45	Cedric Henderson	SF	United States	Memphis

^{*}1st round pick acquired from Phoenix in three-way Antonio McDyess deal.

== Roster ==
1997–98 Cleveland Cavaliers roster
Players

Pos.	No.	Player	Height	Weight	DOB	From
G/F	23	Derek Anderson	6 ft 5 in (1.96 m)	220 lb (100 kg)	1974–07–18	Kentucky
G	2	Scott Brooks	5 ft 11 in (1.80 m)	165 lb (75 kg)	1965–07–31	UC Irvine
G	6	Mitchell Butler	6 ft 5 in (1.96 m)	210 lb (95 kg)	1970–12–15	UCLA
G	27	Tony Dumas	6 ft 6 in (1.98 m)	190 lb (86 kg)	1972–08–25	UMKC
F	35	Danny Ferry	6 ft 10 in (2.08 m)	230 lb (104 kg)	1966–10–17	Duke
F	45	Cedric Henderson	6 ft 7 in (2.01 m)	215 lb (98 kg)	1975–03–11	Memphis
C	11	Zydrunas Ilgauskas	7 ft 3 in (2.21 m)	238 lb (108 kg)	1975–06–05	Lithuania
F	32	Henry James	6 ft 8 in (2.03 m)	220 lb (100 kg)	1965–07–29	St. Mary's (TX)
F	4	Shawn Kemp	6 ft 10 in (2.08 m)	230 lb (104 kg)	1969–11–26	Trinity Valley CC
G	12	Brevin Knight	5 ft 10 in (1.78 m)	170 lb (77 kg)	1975–11–08	Stanford
G	1	Wesley Person	6 ft 6 in (1.98 m)	195 lb (88 kg)	1971–03–28	Auburn
C	52	Vitaly Potapenko	6 ft 10 in (2.08 m)	280 lb (127 kg)	1975–03–21	Wright State
C	44	Shawnelle Scott	6 ft 10 in (2.08 m)	250 lb (113 kg)	1972–06–16	St. John's
G	3	Bob Sura	6 ft 5 in (1.96 m)	200 lb (91 kg)	1973–03–25	Florida State
G	30	Carl Thomas	6 ft 4 in (1.93 m)	175 lb (79 kg)	1969–10–03	Eastern Michigan

Coaches
Head coach
- Mike Fratello
Assistant(s)
- Marc Iavaroni
- Sidney Lowe
- Ron Rothstein

Legend
- (DP) Unsigned draft pick
- (FA) Free agent
- (S) Suspended
- Injured

Roster
Updated: February 22, 1998

== Regular season ==
=== Season standings ===
Central Division	W	L	PCT	GB	Home	Road	Div
y-Chicago Bulls	62	20	.756	–	37–4	25–16	21–7
x-Indiana Pacers	58	24	.707	4	32–9	26–15	19–9
x-Charlotte Hornets	51	31	.622	11	32–9	19–22	16–12
x-Atlanta Hawks	50	32	.610	12	29–12	21–20	19–9
x-Cleveland Cavaliers	47	35	.573	15	27–14	20–21	14–14
Detroit Pistons	37	45	.451	25	25–16	12–29	12–16
Milwaukee Bucks	36	46	.439	26	21–20	15–26	9–19
Toronto Raptors	16	66	.195	46	9–32	7–34	2–26

#	Eastern Conference				
#	Team	W	L	PCT	GB
1	c-Chicago Bulls	62	20	.756	–
2	y-Miami Heat	55	27	.671	7
3	x-Indiana Pacers	58	24	.707	4
4	x-Charlotte Hornets	51	31	.622	11
5	x-Atlanta Hawks	50	32	.610	12
6	x-Cleveland Cavaliers	47	35	.573	15
7	x-New York Knicks	43	39	.524	19
8	x-New Jersey Nets	43	39	.524	19
9	Washington Wizards	42	40	.512	20
10	Orlando Magic	41	41	.500	21
11	Detroit Pistons	37	45	.451	25
12	Boston Celtics	36	46	.439	26
13	Milwaukee Bucks	36	46	.439	26
14	Philadelphia 76ers	31	51	.378	31
15	Toronto Raptors	16	66	.195	46

z - clinched division title
y - clinched division title
x - clinched playoff spot

=== Game log ===
1997–98 game log
Total: 47–35 (home: 27–14; road: 20–21)
October: 0-1 (home: 0–0; road: 0–1)

Game	Date	Opponent	Score	Location/Attendance	Record

November: 9-5 (home: 4–3; road: 5–2)

Game	Date	Opponent	Score	Location/Attendance	Record

December: 8-5 (home: 4–3; road: 4–2)

Game	Date	Opponent	Score	Location/Attendance	Record

January: 9-7 (home: 5–3; road: 4–4)

Game	Date	Opponent	Score	Location/Attendance	Record

February: 4-9 (home: 2–3; road: 2–6)

Game	Date	Opponent	Score	Location/Attendance	Record

March: 11-4 (home: 7–1; road: 4–3)

Game	Date	Opponent	Score	Location/Attendance	Record

April: 6-4 (home: 5–1; road: 1–3)

Game	Date	Opponent	Score	Location/Attendance	Record

== Playoffs ==
1998 playoff game log
First round: 1–3 (home: 1–1; road: 0–2)

Game	Date	Team	Score	High points	High rebounds	High assists	Location Attendance	Series
1	April 23	@ Indiana	L 77–106	Shawn Kemp (25)	Shawn Kemp (13)	Brevin Knight (5)	Market Square Arena; 16,644	0–1
2	April 25	@ Indiana	L 86–92	Shawn Kemp (27)	Zydrunas Ilgauskas (10)	Brevin Knight (7)	Market Square Arena; 16,617	0–2
3	April 27	Indiana	W 86–77	Shawn Kemp (31)	Kemp, Knight (7)	three players tied (5)	Gund Arena; 17,495	1–2
4	April 30	Indiana	L 74–80	Shawn Kemp (21)	Shawn Kemp (12)	Brevin Knight (6)	Gund Arena; 18,188	1–3

1998 schedule

== Player stats ==
Legend
GP	Games played	GS	Games started	MPG	Minutes per game
FG%	Field-goal percentage	3P%	3-point field-goal percentage	FT%	Free-throw percentage
RPG	Rebounds per game	APG	Assists per game	SPG	Steals per game
BPG	Blocks per game	PPG	Points per game

=== Regular season ===
Player	GP	GS	MPG	FG%	3P%	FT%	RPG	APG	SPG	BPG	PPG
Shawn Kemp	80	80	34.6	44.5	25.0	72.7	9.3	2.5	1.4	1.1	18.0
Wesley Person	82	82	39.0	46.0	43.0	77.6	4.4	2.3	1.6	0.6	14.7
Zydrunas Ilgauskas	82	81	29.0	51.8	25.0	76.2	8.8	0.9	0.6	1.6	13.9
Derek Anderson	66	13	27.9	40.8	20.2	87.3	2.8	3.4	1.3	0.2	11.7
Cedric Henderson	82	71	30.8	48.0	0.0	71.6	4.0	2.0	1.2	0.5	10.1
Brevin Knight	80	76	31.0	44.1	0.0	80.1	3.2	8.2	2.5	0.2	9.0
Vitaly Potapenko	80	0	17.7	48.0	0.0	70.8	3.9	0.7	0.3	0.4	7.1
Bob Sura	46	4	20.5	37.7	31.7	56.5	2.0	3.7	1.0	0.2	5.8
Danny Ferry	69	3	15.0	39.5	33.3	80.0	1.7	0.9	0.4	0.2	4.2
Henry James	28	0	5.9	40.7	44.0	95.5	0.5	0.2	0.0	0.0	2.9
Carl Thomas	29	0	9.4	38.6	39.5	61.5	1.3	0.3	0.6	0.2	2.7
Greg Graham	6	0	9.3	58.3	0.0	100.0	0.2	1.0	0.2	0.0	2.7
Mitchell Butler	18	0	11.4	31.9	16.7	60.0	1.2	1.0	0.4	0.0	2.1
Tony Dumas	7	0	6.7	50.0	50.0	0.0	0.7	0.7	0.0	0.0	2.0
Scott Brooks	43	0	7.3	42.4	45.5	90.0	0.7	1.1	0.4	0.1	1.8
Shawnelle Scott	41	0	4.6	44.4	0.0	66.7	1.4	0.2	0.1	0.2	1.1

=== Playoffs ===
Player	GP	GS	MPG	FG%	3P%	FT%	RPG	APG	SPG	BPG	PPG
Shawn Kemp	4	4	38.0	46.5	0.0	84.4	10.3	2.0	1.3	1.0	26.0
Zydrunas Ilgauskas	4	4	36.8	57.1	0.0	52.0	7.5	0.5	0.5	1.3	17.3
Derek Anderson	4	0	25.8	45.5	0.0	88.5	2.3	2.8	1.3	0.3	10.8
Wesley Person	4	4	34.0	37.9	36.8	75.0	2.3	2.5	0.8	0.0	8.0
Cedric Henderson	4	4	39.3	39.3	0.0	61.5	4.3	2.8	1.5	0.0	7.5
Brevin Knight	4	4	33.0	28.6	0.0	60.0	4.0	5.8	2.5	0.3	4.5
Vitaly Potapenko	4	0	17.5	40.0	0.0	50.0	2.8	0.8	0.5	0.0	4.3
Carl Thomas	1	0	11.0	0.0	0.0	66.7	1.0	0.0	0.0	0.0	2.0
Scott Brooks	1	0	8.0	0.0	0.0	100.0	0.0	2.0	0.0	0.0	2.0
Shawnelle Scott	1	0	3.0	50.0	0.0	0.0	0.0	0.0	0.0	1.0	2.0
Bob Sura	3	0	10.3	20.0	0.0	66.7	1.0	1.3	0.3	0.0	1.3
Danny Ferry	3	0	3.3	0.0	0.0	0.0	0.3	0.0	0.0	0.0	0.0

Player statistics citation:

== Awards and records ==
=== Awards ===
- Zydrunas Ilgauskas, NBA All-Rookie First Team
- Brevin Knight, NBA All-Rookie First Team
- Derek Anderson, NBA All-Rookie Second Team
- Cedric Henderson, NBA All-Rookie Second Team

=== All-Star ===
Shawn Kemp – 1998 NBA All-Star Game
