= Cedric Henderson (basketball, born 1975) =

American basketball player (born 1975)

Personal information
- Born: March 11, 1975 (age 51) Memphis, Tennessee U.S.
- Listed height: 6 ft 7 in (2.01 m)
- Listed weight: 225 lb (102 kg)

Career information
- High school: East (Memphis, Tennessee)
- College: Memphis (1993–1997)
- NBA draft: 1997: 2nd round, 44th overall pick
- Drafted by: Cleveland Cavaliers
- Playing career: 1997–2007
- Position: Power forward / small forward
- Number: 45
- Coaching career: 2012–present

Career history

Playing
- 1997–2001: Cleveland Cavaliers
- 2001–2002: Golden State Warriors
- 2003: Mobile Revelers
- 2003: Sagesse Beirut
- 2003: Yakima Sun Kings
- 2004: Great Lakes Storm
- 2004: Fayetteville Patriots
- 2004: Seoul SK Knights
- 2005: Huntsville Flight
- 2005: Blue Stars
- 2006–2007: Khimik
- 2007: Keravnos

Coaching
- 2012–2013: Southwest Tennessee CC (assistant)
- 2013–2014: Wooddale HS
- 2017–2018: Trezevant HS
- 2018–2019: Southwest Tennessee CC
- 2020–2021: Christian Brothers
- 2021–2022: Collierville HS (interim)
- 2022-present: Overton High

Career highlights
- Cypriot Cup champion (2007); CBA champion (2003); NBA All-Rookie Second Team (1998); Third-team Parade All-American (1993); McDonald's All-American (1993)

Career NBA statistics
- Points: 1,885 (7.3 ppg)
- Rebounds: 755 (2.9 rpg)
- Assists: 419 (1.6 apg)
- Stats at NBA.com
- Stats at Basketball Reference

Cedric Earl Henderson (born March 11, 1975) is an American former professional basketball player who played five seasons in the National Basketball Association (NBA).

== Basketball career ==
Henderson was a standout at Memphis East High School and named to the McDonald's All-American Team. At the University of Memphis he played as a small forward. He had a five-year career in the National Basketball Association. Before the 2002–03 NBA season he was signed as a free agent by the Milwaukee Bucks, but he was waived after one month. After he left the NBA, he went to play in the NBDL, France (Division 1), Lebanon (Bluestars), Cyprus and Ukraine, ending his playing years in 2007.

== NBA career statistics ==
Legend
GP	Games played	GS	Games started	MPG	Minutes per game
FG%	Field goal percentage	3P%	3-point field goal percentage	FT%	Free throw percentage
RPG	Rebounds per game	APG	Assists per game	SPG	Steals per game
BPG	Blocks per game	PPG	Points per game	**Bold**	Career high
*	Led the league

=== Regular season ===
Year	Team	GP	GS	MPG	FG%	3P%	FT%	RPG	APG	SPG	BPG	PPG
1997–98	Cleveland	**82***	**71**	**30.8**	.480	.000	.716	**4.0**	2.0	**1.2**	**.5**	**10.1**
1998–99	Cleveland	50*	48	30.3	.417	.167	**.813**	3.9	**2.3**	**1.2**	**.5**	9.1
1999–00	Cleveland	61	7	18.1	.396	.067	.663	2.3	.9	.6	.3	5.4
2000–01	Cleveland	55	10	17.5	.389	.125	.652	1.6	1.4	.5	.4	4.3
2001–02	Golden State	12	0	5.8	**.484**	**.500**	.571	.3	.3	.5	.2	3.0
Career		260	136	23.8	.436	.140	.715	2.9	1.6	.9	.4	7.3

=== Playoffs ===
Year	Team	GP	GS	MPG	FG%	3P%	FT%	RPG	APG	SPG	BPG	PPG
1998	Cleveland	4	4	39.3	.393	.000	.615	4.3	2.8	1.5	.0	7.5
Career		4	4	39.3	.393	.000	.615	4.3	2.8	1.5	.0	7.5

== Coaching career ==
=== College ===
Henderson became the assistant coach and head coach of the men's basketball team at Southwest Tennessee Community College for the 2012–2013 and 2018–2019 seasons, respectively. At Southwest Tennessee, Henderson coached his son and led the team to a 15–10 record in the 2018–2019 season. After Southwest Tennessee Community College he was an assistant coach of the men's basketball team at Christian Brothers University for the 2020–2021 season.

=== High school ===
Henderson also coached high school teams in Memphis. In 2013–2014, he was the head coach at Wooddale High School and the team finished with a 9–16 season. In 2017–2018, he coached at Trezevant High School where the team had a 2–20 record. On October 25, 2021, Henderson was named the interim head coach at Collierville High School in Collierville, Tennessee. On January 20, 2022, he resigned as interim head coach following an internal investigation and reported potential failure to adhere to Collierville Schools Coaches' Code of Conduct Policy. Henderson is currently the Head Men's Basketball Coach at Memphis Day Academy.

== Personal life ==
Henderson received his Bachelor of Interdisciplinary Studies from The University of Memphis in 2008. He became a member of Kappa Alpha Psi in 2021. Henderson's son, Cedric Henderson Jr., was a basketball player at Campbell University and Arizona.
