= Zydrunas Ilgauskas =

Lithuanian-American basketball player (born 1975)

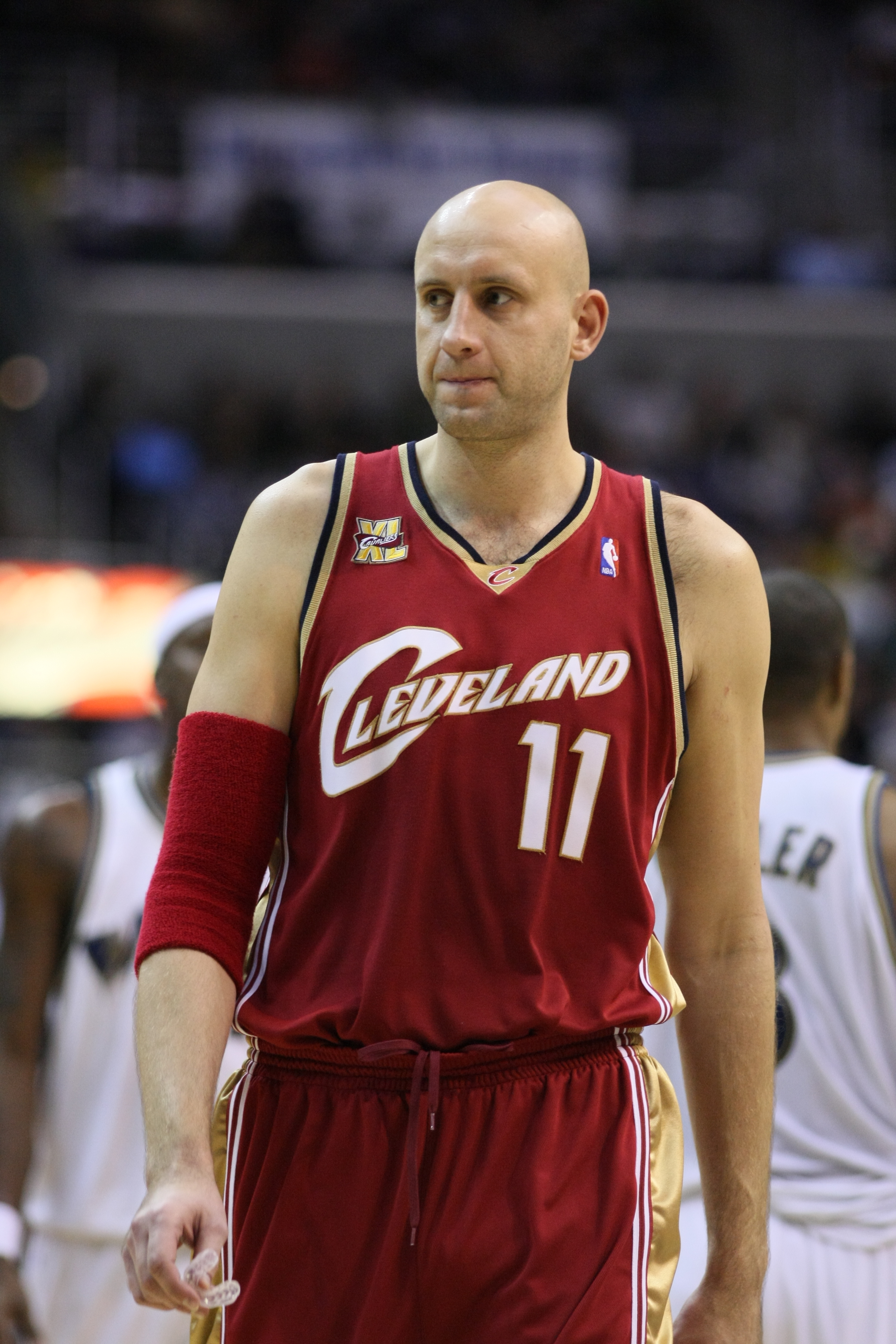
- Ilgauskas with the Cleveland Cavaliers in November 2009

Personal information
- Born: June 5, 1975 (age 51) Kaunas, Lithuania
- Listed height: 7 ft 3 in (2.21 m)
- Listed weight: 260 lb (118 kg)

Career information
- NBA draft: 1996: 1st round, 20th overall pick
- Drafted by: Cleveland Cavaliers
- Playing career: 1993–2011
- Position: Center
- Number: 11

Career history
- 1993–1996: Atletas Kaunas
- 1996–2010: Cleveland Cavaliers
- 2010–2011: Miami Heat

Career highlights
- 2× NBA All-Star (2003, 2005); NBA All-Rookie First Team (1998); No. 11 retired by Cleveland Cavaliers

Career statistics
- Points: 10,976 (13.0 ppg)
- Rebounds: 6,191 (7.3 rpg)
- Blocks: 1,327 (1.6 bpg)
- Stats at NBA.com
- Stats at Basketball Reference

Zydrunas Ilgauskas (Lithuanian: Žydrūnas Ilgauskas; Lithuanian pronunciation: [ʑiːˈdrûːnɐs ɪɫˈɡɐ̂ˑʊ̯skɐs]; born June 5, 1975) is a Lithuanian-born American former professional basketball player who played the center position. The 7 ft 3 in (2.21 m) Ilgauskas played for the Cleveland Cavaliers of the National Basketball Association from 1997 to 2010 and played for the Miami Heat during the 2010–11 season. He was named to the 1997–98 All-Rookie First Team and is a two-time NBA All-Star.

Ilgauskas played in the 2007 NBA Finals as a member of the Cavaliers. He is known for his accurate jump shot, for his rebounding, and for overcoming difficult injury challenges during his career. Nicknamed Big Z, Ilgauskas is the Cavaliers' career leader in blocked shots; his jersey no. 11 has been retired by the team. In 2012, Ilgauskas joined the Cavaliers' front office, becoming a special advisor to the organization.

== Professional career ==
=== Atletas (1993–1996) ===
Ilgauskas made his professional debut in his birthplace of Kaunas, with local club Atletas in 1993. He averaged 20.3 points, 12.8 rebounds and 2.8 blocks per game in the 1994–95 season.

=== Cleveland Cavaliers (1996–2010) ===
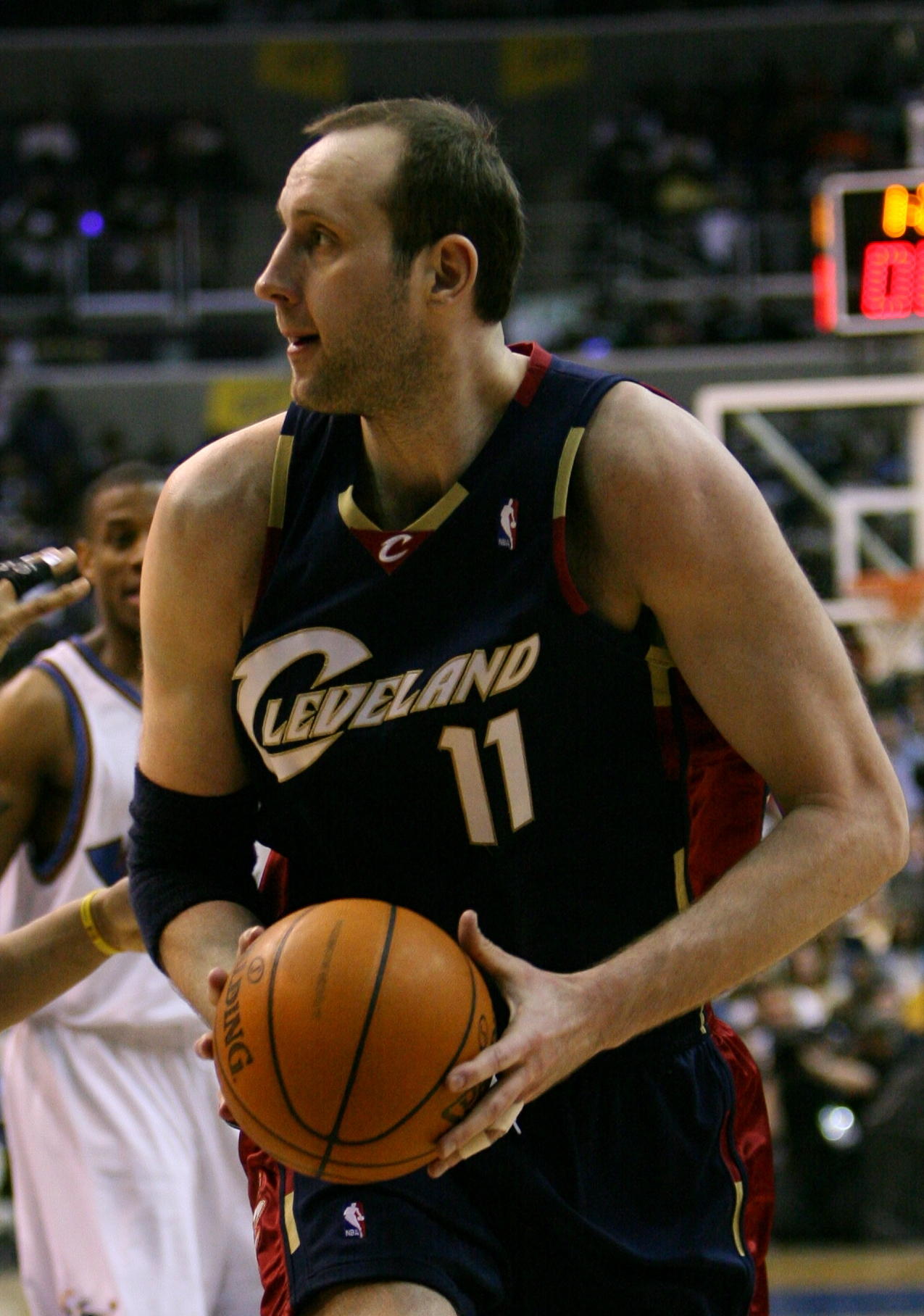
Ilgauskas with the Cavaliers in 2007

Ilgauskas was selected by the Cleveland Cavaliers with the 20th overall pick in the 1996 NBA draft. On August 1, 1996, he signed a multi-year deal with the Cavaliers. In the earliest parts of his career he suffered through a myriad of foot and ankle injuries. He spent the entire 1996–97 season on the injured list due to a broken bone in his right foot.

He was named the most valuable player of the Rookie Challenge during All-Star Weekend and selected to the All-Rookie First Team in 1997–98. He signed a contract extension in 1998 that was worth $70.9 million over six years. However, Ilgauskas played in only five games over the next two seasons. On January 26, 2000, he had a surgery on a fractured navicular bone in his left foot.

He regained the starting center spot for the Cavaliers in 2000–01. He was injured again in December 2000 and was out for the season. The injury dealt a blow to the Cavaliers. After winning 15 out of 23 games with Ilgauskas, they finished with a 30–52 record.

He returned in December 2001 and was mostly used as a backup to Chris Mihm for the rest of the season.

Ilgauskas averaged 17.2 points and 7.5 rebounds in 2002–03. He was selected as an All-Star, but the Cavaliers finished with the third-worst record in team history (17–65) and landed the number one draft pick.

The Cavaliers drafted high school phenomenon and future NBA MVP LeBron James in 2003. James teamed up with Ilgauskas and Drew Gooden to form the core of the team. Ilgauskas only missed nine games over the next three seasons and was selected as an All-Star again in 2005.

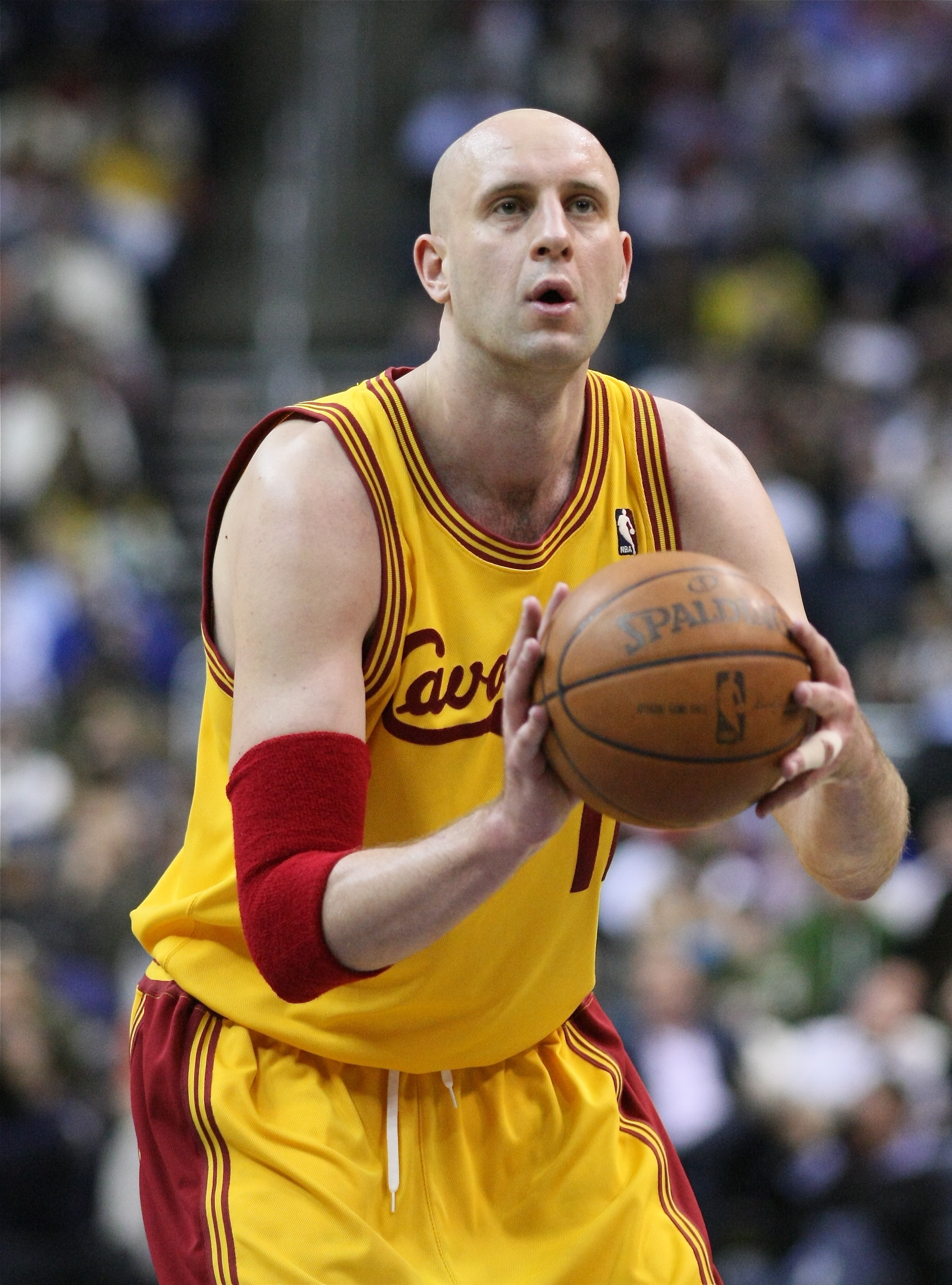
Ilgauskas attempting a free throw in 2009

On July 12, 2005, Ilgauskas signed a contract extension with the Cavaliers. The deal was reportedly worth over $55 million over five years.

For the next four seasons, Ilgauskas was the starting center for the team, which had turned into a contender. They reached the NBA Finals in 2007 and the Eastern Conference Finals in 2009. In summer 2009, the Cavaliers acquired Shaquille O'Neal. When asked about the trade, Ilgauskas responded: "I was just reading the news. That means I'll probably be coming off the bench." On December 2, 2009, Ilgauskas came off the bench in a game against Phoenix Suns to break the team record for career games played, overtaking then-general manager Danny Ferry.

On February 17, 2010, Ilgauskas, along with a 2010 first round pick and the rights to Emir Preldžič, was traded from the Cavaliers to the Washington Wizards as part of a three-team, six-player trade that sent Antawn Jamison from Washington to Cleveland, Al Thornton from the Los Angeles Clippers to Washington, Drew Gooden from Washington to Los Angeles, and Sebastian Telfair from Los Angeles to Cleveland. On February 25, 2010, the Wizards bought out his contract, making him a free agent. Ilgauskas did not play in any games for the Wizards. It was possible for Ilgauskas to return to the Cavaliers, but only after a 30-day waiting period policy required for players traded from their former teams after being bought out of their contract by their new team. He was still free to sign with any other team. As part of the 2011 Collective Bargaining Agreement (CBA), this loophole was changed so that a player acquired in a trade and waived by his new team cannot re-sign with his original team until one year after the trade or July 1 after the expiration of his contract, whichever is sooner. Some have coined this the "Zydrunas Ilgauskas rule".

On March 23, 2010, Ilgauskas signed a one-year deal for the remainder of the 2009–10 season with the Cleveland Cavaliers. He made his return a day later in a win over the New Orleans Hornets. In his first home game back with the team, against the Sacramento Kings, Ilgauskas received huge ovations and support from the crowd. Quicken Loans Arena was affectionately renamed "The Z" for the day, in honor of the Lithuanian.

The 2010 NBA playoffs marked the first time in Ilgauskas' career in which he was not a significant part of the Cavaliers' rotation. Ilgauskas saw only 69 minutes of floor time in the entire postseason, resulting in averages of 1.7 PPG and 1.6 RPG, far below his career playoff production. The Cavaliers were eliminated by the Boston Celtics in the Eastern Conference semifinals.

On March 8, 2014, Ilgauskas' number 11 was retired by the Cleveland Cavaliers. At the time, he was only the third European to be honored in this way by an NBA team, after Dražen Petrović and Vlade Divac.

=== Miami Heat (2010–2011) ===
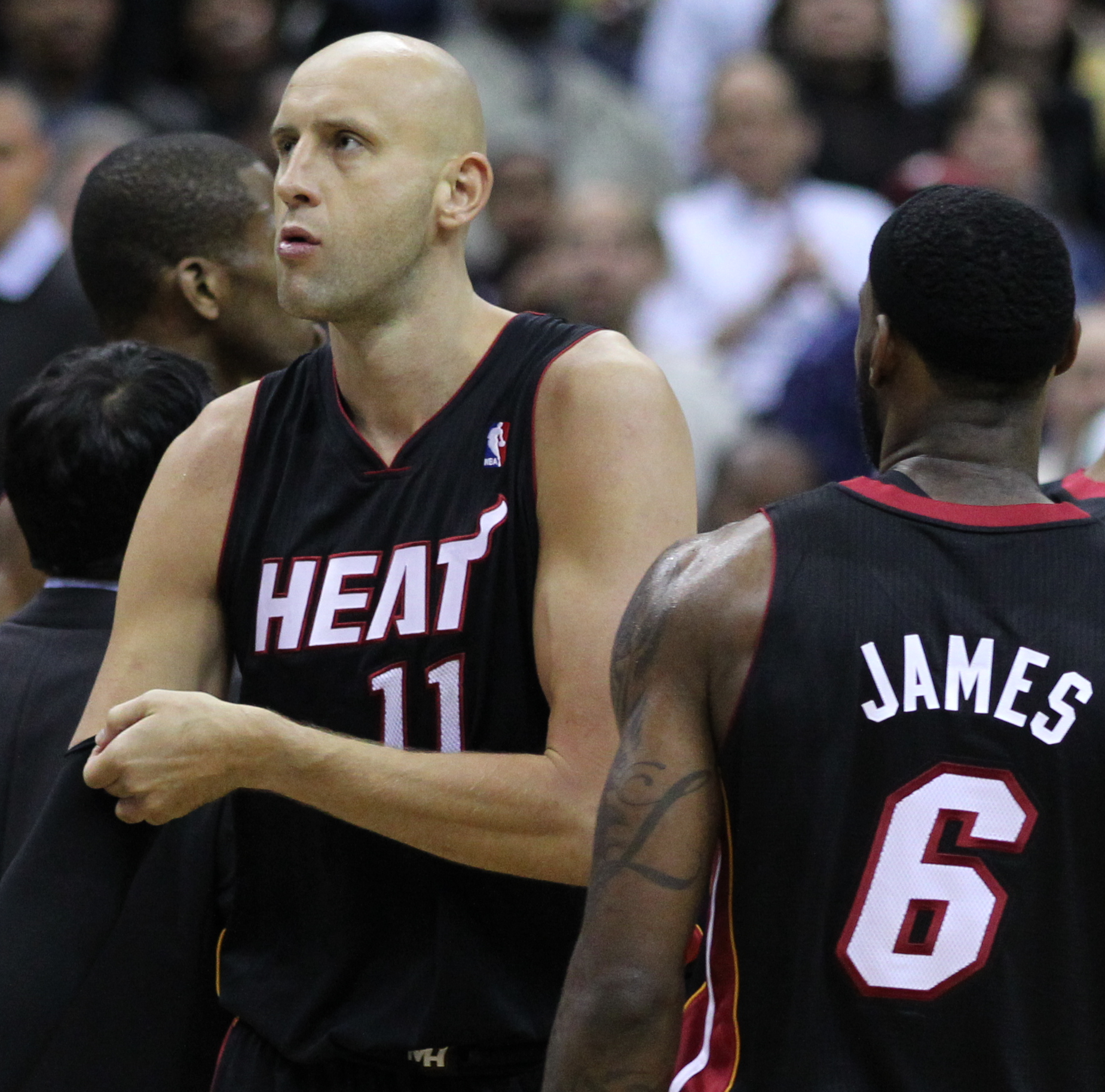
Ilgauskas with the Heat in 2011

On July 17, 2010, Ilgauskas signed with the Miami Heat. The Heat's signings of Chris Bosh and long-time teammate LeBron James influenced Ilgauskas' decision to join the Heat. On December 2, during the Heat's first game in Cleveland, the fans cheered Ilgauskas in pre-game introductions, while booing the rest of the starters, including James. The Heat made it to the 2011 NBA Finals, but fell short to the Dallas Mavericks in six games.

In September 2011, Ilgauskas announced that he was retiring from basketball, saying he wanted to spend more time with his family as well as citing long-term personal physical fatigue and basic bodily wear-and-tear.

== National team career ==
Ilgauskas made his debut with the Lithuania national team in 1994, when the team was qualifying for a spot in the EuroBasket 1995. He averaged 7.7 points and 7.0 rebounds per game. He later wanted to play for the Lithuania national team in the 2008 Summer Olympics, but the Cavaliers did not permit him to play due to his injury history.

== NBA career statistics ==
Legend
GP	Games played	GS	Games started	MPG	Minutes per game
FG%	Field goal percentage	3P%	3-point field goal percentage	FT%	Free throw percentage
RPG	Rebounds per game	APG	Assists per game	SPG	Steals per game
BPG	Blocks per game	PPG	Points per game	**Bold**	Career high
*	Led the league

=== Regular season ===
Year	Team	GP	GS	MPG	FG%	3P%	FT%	RPG	APG	SPG	BPG	PPG
1997–98	Cleveland	**82***	**81**	29.0	**.518**	.250	.762	8.8	.9	.6	1.6	13.9
1998–99	Cleveland	5	5	**34.2**	.509	—	.600	8.8	.8	**.8**	1.4	15.2
2000–01	Cleveland	24	24	25.7	.487	.000	.679	6.7	.8	.6	1.5	11.7
2001–02	Cleveland	62	23	21.4	.425	.000	.754	5.4	1.1	.3	1.4	11.1
2002–03	Cleveland	81	**81**	30.0	.441	.000	.781	7.5	**1.6**	.7	1.9	**17.2**
2003–04	Cleveland	81	**81**	31.3	.483	.286	.746	8.1	1.3	.5	**2.5**	15.3
2004–05	Cleveland	78	78	33.5	.468	.286	.799	8.6	1.3	.7	2.1	16.9
2005–06	Cleveland	78	78	29.3	.506	.000	.**834**	7.6	1.2	.5	1.7	15.6
2006–07	Cleveland	78	78	27.3	.485	.000	.807	7.7	**1.6**	.6	1.3	11.9
2007–08	Cleveland	73	73	30.4	.474	.000	.802	**9.3**	1.4	.5	1.6	14.1
2008–09	Cleveland	65	65	27.2	.472	.385	.799	7.5	1.0	.4	1.3	12.9
2009–10	Cleveland	64	6	20.9	.443	**.478**	.743	5.4	.8	.2	.8	7.4
2010–11	Miami	72	51	15.9	.508	.000	.783	4.0	.4	.3	.8	5.0
Career		843	724	27.2	.476	.310	.780	7.3	1.1	.5	1.6	13.0
All-Star		2	0	10.5	.556	.000	1.000	3.5	.5	.0	1.0	6.0

=== Playoffs ===
Year	Team	GP	GS	MPG	FG%	3P%	FT%	RPG	APG	SPG	BPG	PPG
1998	Cleveland	4	4	**36.8**	**.571**	—	.520	7.5	.5	**.5**	1.3	**17.3**
2006	Cleveland	13	13	27.2	.454	—	.750	6.3	.8	.4	**2.1**	10.4
2007	Cleveland	**20**	**20**	32.5	.492	—	**.838**	**9.7**	.9	**.5**	.8	12.6
2008	Cleveland	13	13	30.2	.479	—	.818	7.5	**1.6**	.4	1.1	13.1
2009	Cleveland	14	14	29.1	.449	**.154**	.636	7.8	1.2	.4	.9	10.5
2010	Cleveland	7	0	9.9	.385	—	.667	1.6	.4	.0	1.0	1.7
2011	Miami	9	8	11.6	.467	—	.667	3.6	.3	.0	.3	3.6
Career		80	72	26.5	.477	.154	.744	6.9	.9	.3	1.1	10.2

== Front office work ==
On January 11, 2012, Ilgauskas made a return to Cleveland when he was hired by then Cleveland Cavaliers GM Chris Grant to serve as his assistant. His duties included evaluating amateur and pro talent prospects.

== Coaching career ==
On September 18, 2015, Ilgauskas joined Saint Ignatius High School as the assistant coach for the boys' team.

== Personal life ==
Ilgauskas and his wife were married during the summer of 2004. In 2007, the couple lost a set of twins due to pregnancy complications that caused the infants to be born four months premature. In the summer of 2009, Ilgauskas adopted two Lithuanian brothers (aged five and four at the time) from his hometown of Kaunas. On September 13, 2022, it was announced that Ilgauskas' wife died at the age of 50 on September 11.

Ilgauskas is an avid reader. He particularly enjoys military history. During his playing career, he often read in the locker room before games.

Ilgauskas became a United States citizen in 2013. In doing so, he lost his Lithuanian citizenship, as Lithuania limits the possibility of dual citizenship.

== Filmography ==
Year	Title	Role	Notes	Ref
2004	Lietuvos Krepšinis 1920–2004	Himself	Documentary about basketball in Lithuania in 1920–2004.	
2012	The Other Dream Team	Himself	Documentary about the Lithuania men's national basketball team at the 1992 Summer Olympics.	

== See also ==
- List of tallest players in NBA history
- List of European basketball players in the United States
