= 1998 NBA All-Star Game =

48th edition of the National Basketball Association All-Star Game

	1	2	3	4	Total
West	25	33	33	23	114
East	33	34	34	34	135
- Date: February 8, 1998
- Arena: Madison Square Garden
- City: New York City
- MVP: Michael Jordan
- National anthem: Cast of 1776 (USA); Robert Cuccioli (Canada)
- Halftime show: Broadway All-Stars (featuring cast members from Chicago, Bring'n Da Noise Bring'n Da Funk, Phantom of the Opera, Cats, The Scarlet Pimpernel, Jekyll and Hyde, Miss Saigon, Smokey Joe's Cafe, Les Misérables, Titanic)
- Attendance: 18,323
- Network: NBC; TNT (All-Star Saturday)
- Announcers: Bob Costas, Isiah Thomas and Bill Walton

NBA All-Star Game
< 1997	2000 >

The 1998 NBA All-Star Game was the 48th edition of the National Basketball Association (NBA) All-Star Game. The event was held at Madison Square Garden in New York City, home of the New York Knicks. This was the fourth time that New York City hosted the All-Star Game; the first three were in 1954, 1955, and 1968, at the previous Madison Square Garden. The current arena was originally selected to host the game in 1968, but it was moved to the older arena due to construction delays.

The East won the game 135–114. Michael Jordan was named as the game's Most Valuable Player. Besides the NBA All-Star game, there were two other events that occurred in the All-Star Weekend including the Rookies Game and the Three-Point Shootout.

== Background ==
The Madison Square Garden in New York City was announced to host the All-Star Game on September 25, 1996, when reports surfaced ahead of a formal joint announcement by the NBA and the New York Knicks. The NBA selected the arena over competing bids from Portland, Oregon (Rose Garden) and Philadelphia (CoreStates Center).

== Summary ==
=== Coaches ===
The Western All-Stars were coached by George Karl, the head coach of the Western Conference leader Seattle SuperSonics. The Eastern All-Stars were coached by Larry Bird, the head coach of the Eastern Conference leader Indiana Pacers.

=== Players ===
This would be the All-Star debut of Kobe Bryant, who became the youngest All-Star in NBA history at 19 years of age. It would also be the debut for rookie Tim Duncan. Bryant had a team-high 18 points. Michael Jordan earned MVP honors, scoring 23 points, grabbing six rebounds, and dishing out eight assists. This was Jordan's third MVP award. The game featured four all-stars from the Los Angeles Lakers.

This was the first All-Star game to feature both Kobe Bryant and Michael Jordan. Jordan would come out of retirement once more in 2001 and play two more seasons (earning All-Star selections both years) for the Washington Wizards. In 1998, Michael Jordan led all the players in All-Star Game votes with 1,028,235 votes from the fans. This was also the first year that Shaquille O'Neal was able to play in the All-Star Game as a member of the Los Angeles Lakers as he was sidelined in 1997 due to a knee injury.

This would be the last All-Star Game until 2000, as a labor dispute caused the following season to be shortened. A total of 9 players from this game would not play in another All-Star Game: Nick Van Exel, Steve Smith, Penny Hardaway, Tim Hardaway, Shawn Kemp, Mitch Richmond, Vin Baker, Rik Smits and Jayson Williams.

=== Roster ===
Western Conference All-Stars
Pos	Player	Team	No. of selections	Votes
Starters
G	Gary Payton	Seattle SuperSonics	5th	555,715
G	Kobe Bryant	Los Angeles Lakers	1st	395,686
F	Kevin Garnett	Minnesota Timberwolves	2nd	513,325
F	Karl Malone	Utah Jazz	11th	616,251
C	Shaquille O'Neal	Los Angeles Lakers	6th	565,184
Reserves
G	Jason Kidd	Phoenix Suns	2nd	305,834
G	Eddie Jones	Los Angeles Lakers	2nd	300,658
G	Nick Van Exel	Los Angeles Lakers	1st	232,274
G	Mitch Richmond	Sacramento Kings	6th	197,695
F	Tim Duncan	San Antonio Spurs	1st	423,970
F	Vin Baker	Seattle SuperSonics	4th	360,079
C	David Robinson	San Antonio Spurs	8th	548,633
Head coach: George Karl (Seattle SuperSonics)

Eastern Conference All-Stars
Pos	Player	Team	No. of selections	Votes
Starters
G	Penny Hardaway	Orlando Magic	4th	509,626
G	Michael Jordan	Chicago Bulls	12th	1,028,235
F	Grant Hill	Detroit Pistons	4th	838,692
F	Shawn Kemp	Cleveland Cavaliers	6th	518,361
C	Dikembe Mutombo	Atlanta Hawks	5th	476,432
Reserves
G	Tim Hardaway	Miami Heat	5th	349,621
G	Reggie Miller	Indiana Pacers	4th	221,814
G	Steve Smith	Atlanta Hawks	1st	114,982
F	Glen Rice	Charlotte Hornets	3rd	270,277
F	Antoine Walker	Boston Celtics	1st	137,994
F	Jayson Williams	New Jersey Nets	1st	—
C	Rik Smits	Indiana Pacers	1st	117,744
Head coach: Larry Bird (Indiana Pacers)

=== Game ===
NBC

February 8, 1998

Western Conference 114, Eastern Conference 135
Scoring by quarter: 25–33, 33–34, 33–34, 23–34
Pts: Kobe Bryant 18; Rebs: Eddie Jones, Tim Duncan 11 each Asts: Gary Payton 13	Pts: Michael Jordan 23; Rebs: Shawn Kemp 11; Asts: Michael Jordan 8

Madison Square Garden, New York City, New York
Attendance: 18,323
Referees:
- Hue Hollins
- Bernie Fryer
- Bob Delaney

Grant Hill and Michael Jordan shot the best field goal percentages this game when comparing players who shot ten or more shots. Grant Hill was 7/11 from the field and he knocked down a three (.636%). Michael Jordan was 10/18 from the field and he also knocked down one three (.556%).

The halftime show featured the Broadway All-Stars.

=== Boxscore ===
Eastern Conference

Team	Player	Min	Fg	3pt	Ft	Off	Def	Reb	Ast	Pf	St	To	Bs	Pts
CLE	Shawn Kemp	25	5–10	0–1	2–2	2	9	11	2	2	4	4	0	12
DET	Grant Hill	28	7–11	1–1	0–0	0	3	3	5	1	1	0	0	15
ATL	Dikembe Mutombo	19	4–5	0–0	1–2	1	6	7	0	3	0	0	1	9
CHI	Michael Jordan	32	10–18	1–1	2–3	1	5	6	8	0	3	2	0	23
ORL	Penny Hardaway	12	3–5	0–1	0–0	0	0	0	3	0	0	1	0	6
MIA	Tim Hardaway	17	3–8	2–5	0–0	0	1	1	6	0	0	6	0	8
NJN	Jayson Williams	19	2–3	0–0	0–0	3	7	10	1	2	0	0	0	4
IND	Rik Smits	21	3–7	0–0	4–4	2	5	7	4	3	0	0	2	10
IND	Reggie Miller	20	6–8	1–2	1–2	0	0	0	0	2	1	0	0	14
CHA	Glen Rice	16	6–14	4–6	0–0	1	0	1	0	0	0	1	0	16
ATL	Steve Smith	16	6–12	2–5	0–0	2	1	3	0	0	0	0	0	14
BOS	Antoine Walker	15	2–8	0–3	0–0	1	2	3	3	0	1	1	0	4
	TOTAL	240	57–109	11–25	10–13	13	39	52	32	13	10	15	3	135

Western Conference

Team	Player	Min	Fg	3pt	Ft	Off	Def	Reb	Ast	Pf	St	To	Bs	Pts
UTA	Karl Malone	17	2–4	0–0	0–0	0	3	3	2	1	2	0	0	4
MIN	Kevin Garnett	21	6–11	0–1	0–0	1	3	4	2	0	2	3	1	12
LAL	Shaquille O'Neal	18	5–10	0–0	2–4	2	2	4	1	2	0	2	0	12
LAL	Kobe Bryant	22	7–16	2–3	2–2	2	4	6	1	1	2	1	0	18
SEA	Gary Payton	24	3–7	1–3	0–0	2	1	3	13	0	2	4	0	7
SEA	Vin Baker	21	3–12	0–0	2–2	6	2	8	0	1	1	0	0	8
LAL	Eddie Jones	25	7–19	0–7	1–2	7	4	11	1	1	2	0	0	15
SAS	David Robinson	22	3–4	0–0	9–10	2	4	6	0	1	2	2	2	15
SAC	Mitch Richmond	17	4–11	0–2	0–0	0	1	1	2	0	0	0	0	8
PHO	Jason Kidd	19	0–1	0–0	0–0	0	1	1	9	2	0	2	0	0
SAS	Tim Duncan	14	1–4	0–1	0–0	1	10	11	1	0	0	2	0	2
LAL	Nick Van Exel	20	5–14	1–6	2–2	1	2	3	2	0	0	2	0	13
	TOTAL	240	46–113	4–23	18–22	24	37	61	34	9	13	18	3	114

== Rookies Game ==
The NBA Rookies game took place on the Friday before the All-Star Game. The coaches of the teams were Willis Reed for the East and Dave DeBusschere for the West. The East would win their consecutive rookies game as Zydrunas Ilgauskas, the Cleveland Cavalier's center became the first international player to be recognized as the game's MVP. The final box score of the 1998 NBA Rookies was 85-80 for the East.

Eastern Conference

Team	Player	Min	Fg	3pt	Ft	Off	Def	Reb	Ast	Pf	St	To	Bs	Pts
PHLA	Tim Thomas	19	3–6	0-3	3-3	2	3	5	0	3	0	1	0	9
NJ	Keith Van Horn	25	6–12	0-1	5-6	3	7	10	0	0	1	3	0	17
CLE	Zydrunas Ilgauskas	24	8–10	0-0	2-2	3	4	7	2	3	0	1	2	18
CLE	Brevin Knight	17	0-1	0-0	1-2	0	3	3	8	1	0	3	0	1
BOS	Ron Mercer	22	4-10	0-0	0-0	2	2	4	2	1	0	3	0	8
BOS	Chauncey Billups	16	3-7	2-4	1-5	3	2	5	7	0	2	2	0	9
CLE	Cedric Henderson	17	7-13	0-0	0-0	1	1	2	2	1	0	1	1	14
TOR	Tracy McGrady	10	4-7	1-2	0-0	1	1	2	1	0	0	0	0	9
	TOTAL	150	35-66	3-10	12-18	15	23	38	22	9	3	14	3	85

Western Conference

Team	Player	Min	Fg	3pt	Ft	Off	Def	Reb	Ast	Pf	St	To	Bs	Pts
HOU	Rodrick Rhodes	25	2–8	0-1	0–0	0	2	2	2	1	2	3	0	4
LAC	Maurice Taylor	24	6–14	0-0	0–0	1	5	6	2	0	2	1	0	12
SAC	Michael Stewart	19	6–9	0-0	1-1	3	3	6	1	2	2	0	0	13
DEN	Bobby Jackson	24	7–14	0-3	1-1	0	2	2	13	4	2	1	0	15
VAN	Antonio Daniels	25	7–11	0-0	0-0	1	3	4	0	1	1	1	0	14
POR	Kelvin Cato	11	3–7	0-1	1-3	2	1	3	1	2	2	1	1	9
DEN	Danny Fortson	11	4–7	0-0	3-4	5	1	6	0	0	2	0	1	9
POR	Alvin Williams	11	1–3	1-1	1-4	0	0	0	0	1	2	1	0	4
	TOTAL	150	36–73	1-6	7-12	12	17	29	19	11	12	8	2	80

Score by periods:	1	2	Final
Western Conference	38	47	80
Eastern Conference	42	38	85

== Three - Point Shootout ==
The 3 Point shootout was held during the NBA All-Star Saturday. Eight players were selected to compete, all from different teams. There were three rounds in which the four top players will advance to the semifinal round and the top two in the semifinals will advance to the final round. Jeff Hornacek, Hubert Davis, Dale Ellis, and Charlie Ward advanced to the semifinals with Jeff Hornacek and Hubert Davis competing in the finals. In the end, it was Jeff Hornacek who won the 3 Point Shootout.

Players	1st Round	Semifinal	Final
Jeff Hornacek	17	15*	16
Hubert Davis	15	24	10
Dale Ellis	18	15*
Charlie Ward	15	11
Sam Mack	14
Glen Rice	13
Tracy Murray	12
Reggie Miller	12

- Hornacek and Ellis tied during the semifinals and were given an extra 30-second round to break the tie.
