= Marcus Camby =

American basketball player (born 1974)

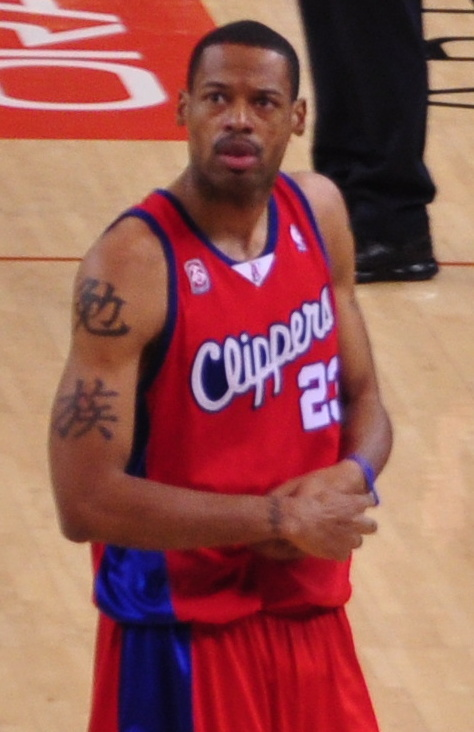
- Camby with the Los Angeles Clippers in 2009

Personal information
- Born: March 22, 1974 (age 52) Hartford, Connecticut, U.S.
- Listed height: 6 ft 11 in (2.11 m)
- Listed weight: 240 lb (109 kg)

Career information
- High school: Conard (West Hartford, Connecticut); Hartford Public (Hartford, Connecticut)
- College: UMass (1993–1996)
- NBA draft: 1996: 1st round, 2nd overall pick
- Drafted by: Toronto Raptors
- Playing career: 1996–2013
- Position: Center / power forward
- Number: 23, 21, 29

Career history
- 1996–1998: Toronto Raptors
- 1998–2002: New York Knicks
- 2002–2008: Denver Nuggets
- 2008–2010: Los Angeles Clippers
- 2010–2012: Portland Trail Blazers
- 2012: Houston Rockets
- 2012–2013: New York Knicks

Career highlights
- NBA Defensive Player of the Year (2007); 2× NBA All-Defensive First Team (2007, 2008); 2× NBA All-Defensive Second Team (2005, 2006); 4× NBA blocks leader (1998, 2006–2008); NBA All-Rookie First Team (1997); National college player of the year (1996); Consensus first-team All-American (1996); Atlantic 10 Player of the Year (1996); First Team All-Atlantic 10 (1996); No. 21 retired by UMass Minutemen; Fourth-team Parade All-American (1993)

Career statistics
- Points: 9,262 (9.5 ppg)
- Rebounds: 9,513 (9.8 rpg)
- Blocks: 2,331 (2.4 bpg)
- Stats at NBA.com
- Stats at Basketball Reference

Marcus Dion Camby (born March 22, 1974) is an American former professional basketball player who played 17 seasons in the National Basketball Association (NBA). He was named Defensive Player of the Year during the 2006–07 NBA season, leading the league in blocked shots per game. Camby is also a four-time member of the NBA All-Defensive Team and is 12th on the NBA's all-time career blocks list.

== Early life ==
Marcus Dion Camby was born on March 22, 1974, in Hartford, Connecticut. Camby began his high school career at Conard High School in West Hartford, Connecticut. He transferred to Hartford Public High School. In his senior season, Camby averaged 27 points, 11 rebounds, 8 blocks and 8 assists, en route to a 27–0 record and state title. He was named Gatorade's Connecticut Player of the Year.

== College career ==
Camby played three seasons for the UMass Minutemen. He had an NCAA freshman record 105 total blocks during his first year at UMass, and was named the Atlantic 10's Freshman of the Year. Camby was named to the A-10's First Team during his sophomore season in 1994–95, as the Minutemen reached the Elite Eight of the NCAA Tournament.

Camby won the John R. Wooden Award and the Naismith College Player of the Year Award during the 1995–96 season. He led UMass to numerous #1 rankings and the 1996 NCAA Final Four. In the NCAA tournament, Camby set a tourney record of 43 total blocked shots in 11 games. On April 29, 1996, Camby announced that he would forgo his senior year at UMass and enter the NBA draft.

In 1997, UMass' visit to the Final Four was vacated by the NCAA because Camby had been found to have accepted $28,000 from two sports agents. As part of the penalty, the school was forced to return their $151,617 in revenue from the 1996 NCAA Tournament. Camby later reimbursed the school for the amount lost. According to a 1997 Sports Illustrated article, the agents, John Lounsbury and Wesley Spears of Connecticut, had hoped that Camby would hire them to represent him when he became a professional. The article reported that Camby had also received "jewelry, rental cars and prostitutes" from the agents.

Camby was inducted into the UMass Athletic Hall of Fame on September 10, 2010. Though some criticized the school for inducting a student-athlete who caused their Final Four achievement to be vacated, others saw it as a positive recognition of one of the school's best ever athletes.

Camby returned to school, taking online courses from UMass, and earned his degree on May 12, 2017.

== Professional career ==
=== Toronto Raptors (1996–1998) ===
Camby was selected second overall in the first round of the 1996 NBA draft by the Toronto Raptors. In his rookie season, he made the NBA All-Rookie First Team, averaging 14.8 points, 6.3 rebounds, and 2.1 blocks per game. On March 27, 1997, Camby had perhaps his best game as a rookie, scoring 37 points (a remarkable 47% of Toronto's points) and grabbing 8 rebounds in a 90–79 loss against the Atlanta Hawks. In the following season, Camby led the league in blocked shots with 3.7 per game. However, Camby's disagreements with Butch Carter led Toronto to trade him to the Knicks.

=== New York Knicks (1998–2002) ===
In 1998, Camby was traded to the New York Knicks in a draft-day deal for longtime Knick Charles Oakley and the draft rights of Sean Marks. Following the trade, Camby stated of Oakley: "No one can replace Oak. He was the heart and soul and team leader. I play different positions. I bring versatility. We'll take it one day at a time and focus on winning, that's what I'm about."

For his first two seasons in New York, Camby backed up veteran All-Star center Patrick Ewing. The Knicks struggled to establish on-court chemistry in the lockout-shorted 1998–99 season, finishing with a 27–23 record, which was just good enough to qualify for the 8th and final seed in the Eastern Conference. In the playoffs, Camby and teammate (and close friend) Latrell Sprewell began to assert themselves as the Knicks shocked the top-seeded Miami Heat and swept the Atlanta Hawks in the first two rounds, setting up a meeting with the rival Indiana Pacers in the Eastern Conference Finals. After Ewing went down with a season-ending Achilles injury early in the series, Camby filled the void, averaging double-doubles in the last three games of the series to lead the Knicks to a six-game upset series win over the Pacers and into the NBA Finals. The Knicks became the first 8th-seeded team to make it to the NBA Finals, where they matched up with the San Antonio Spurs. The Spurs defeated the Knicks in five games to win the 1999 Championship.

In the 1999–00 season the Knicks with Ewing back at center bounced back and won 50 games thanks to the contributions of many of the veteran players, including the Sixth Man of the Year Award-type season from Camby. In the playoffs, the Knicks defeated the Toronto Raptors in three games and Miami Heat in seven games in the first two rounds of the playoffs en route to making it to the Eastern Conference Finals for the second year in a row. There they faced the top seed in the East, the Indiana Pacers, and were defeated by them in six games.

During a game against the San Antonio Spurs on January 15, 2001, Camby took a roundhouse swing at Spurs' forward Danny Ferry after he was hit in the eye on a box-out. The punch missed Ferry because Knicks' head coach Jeff Van Gundy stepped in at the last second, resulting in his being head-butted by Camby. Van Gundy required 15 stitches to close a gash above his left eye. Camby, who ended up with scratches on his face from both incidents, was suspended for five games and fined $25,000. Ferry was suspended for one game and fined $7,500 for the initial foul. Upon returning from the suspension, Camby began to play his best ball of the season in averaging 12 points with 11 rebounds and 2 blocks a game; however, it was not enough as the Knicks were defeated by the Toronto Raptors in five games in the first round of the playoffs. Camby spent most of the 2001–02 season injured, and without him as an inside presence, the Knicks struggled with a 30–52 record and missed the playoffs. Camby, after getting traded to Denver, accused the Knicks training staff of misdiagnosing his injury and causing him to miss more games than he should have. The Nuggets however, sided with the Knicks.

=== Denver Nuggets (2002–2008) ===
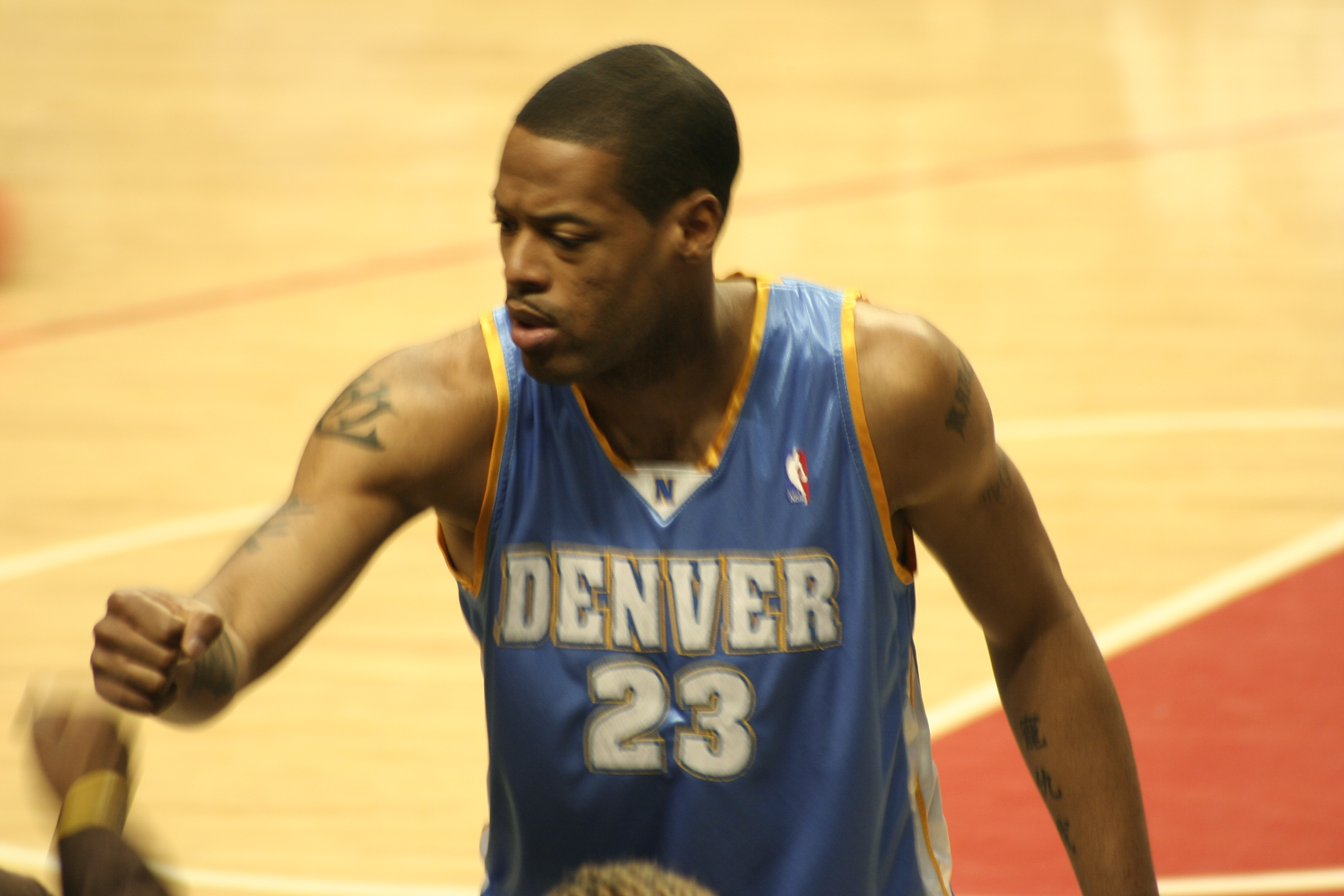
Camby with the Nuggets in 2008

During the 2002 NBA draft, the Knicks traded Camby, Mark Jackson and Nenê to the Denver Nuggets in exchange for Antonio McDyess and Frank Williams.

In the 2003–04 season, along with rookie teammate Carmelo Anthony, Camby helped lead the Nuggets back to the playoffs where they were defeated by the Minnesota Timberwolves.

Camby led the NBA in blocked shots four times - 1997-'98, '05-'06, '06-'07, and '07-'08. During the 2005–06 season with the Nuggets he had 12.0 rebounds per game, 9.6 defensive rebounds per game and 1.4 steals per game. He also averaged 12.8 points per game and led the league in blocks per game (3.3), while helping Denver earn a playoff berth by winning the Northwest Division.

On December 16, 2006, Camby was involved in the Knicks–Nuggets brawl. He was one of 10 players ejected from the game, but received no suspension.

On January 14, 2006, Marcus Camby achieved a perfect shooting performance, scoring a career-high 31 points without a single missed shot, including free throws. He finished the game 12-of-12 from the field and 7-of-7 from the free-throw line in a victory over the Milwaukee Bucks. This stands as the highest-scoring game in NBA history with a 100% shooting percentage from both the field and the free-throw line. The widely recognized NBA record for most points in a game without missing a field goal belongs to Wilt Chamberlain, who scored 42 points on February 24, 1967, but he missed free throws in that contest (making 6 of 10 attempts).

Camby won the NBA Defensive Player of the Year Award for the 2006–07 season. The honor was the first of Camby's career. He received the actual award from NBA commissioner David Stern on April 28, 2007, during a pregame ceremony at the Nuggets' first home 2006–07 playoff game against the San Antonio Spurs. During the 2006–07 season, Camby averaged 3.3 blocks per game (first in the league), 11.7 rebounds per game (fifth in the league), 9.3 defensive rebounds per game (second in the league) and 1.24 steals per game (second among centers).

During the 2007–08 NBA season, Camby continued to make his mark as one of the best defensive players and centers in the game. He finished the season averaging 13.1 rebounds per game (second in the league), 18.1 rebounds per 48 minutes (first in the league), 10.2 defensive rebounds per game (second in the league), 14.1 defensive rebounds per 48 minutes (first in the league), 3.61 blocks per game (first in the league), 4.96 blocks per 48 minutes (first in the league), 285 total blocks (first in the league), 1.06 steals per game (third among centers) and 3.3 assists per game (second among centers). On December 26, 2007, in a Nuggets home win against the Milwaukee Bucks, Camby posted a triple-double, with 10 points (which included a three-pointer), 11 rebounds and 10 blocks. The triple-double was Camby's third of his career and the first since April 19, 1998, against the Philadelphia 76ers. On January 14, 2008, in a Nuggets road loss against the Charlotte Bobcats, Camby had a game of 20 points, 23 rebounds, 6 assists, and 6 blocks. He became only the fourth player since 1990 to have at least 20 points, 20 rebounds, 6 assists, and 6 blocks in one game. On January 17, 2008, in a Nuggets home win against the Utah Jazz, Camby became just the third player since blocked shots became an official NBA stat in 1973–74 with at least 24 rebounds and 11 blocks in a game. On January 25, 2008, in a Nuggets home win against the New Jersey Nets, Camby blocked 4 shots—and in the process—recorded his 1,000th blocked shot as a member of the Nuggets. On March 16, 2008, in a historic 168–116 home win in regulation over the Seattle SuperSonics (the 168 points were the most points scored in franchise history – fourth most in NBA history – for a non-overtime game), Camby recorded his second triple-double of the 2007–08 NBA season when he had 13 points, 15 rebounds and 10 assists. The triple-double was accomplished in an NBA record-tying 27 minutes.

=== Los Angeles Clippers (2008–2010) ===
On July 15, 2008, Camby was traded to the Los Angeles Clippers for the option to swap second-round draft picks in the 2010 NBA draft. Camby said that he was unhappy that he was traded from the Nuggets, essentially being made the scapegoat for their lack of post-season success.

"I thought I had done everything possible that I could do with that team, and just tried to go about things the right way. I just thought the way they went about it was classless; they didn't let me know anything. That's a thing of the past right now, that's something I put behind me and I'm looking forward to embarking on this journey."

In the first part of the 2008–09 NBA season, he started at power forward, with Chris Kaman remaining as the starting center. Then, an injury that occurred to Kaman and the arrival of forward Zach Randolph brought Camby back to the starting center position. On December 17, 2008, Camby pulled down a career-high 27 rebounds in a 115–109 overtime loss against the Chicago Bulls. He also had 19 points, 2 assists, 1 steal, and 4 blocks.

=== Portland Trail Blazers (2010–2012) ===
On February 16, 2010, Camby was traded to the Portland Trail Blazers for Steve Blake, Travis Outlaw, and 1.5 million dollars in cash.

Camby played in 23 games for the Portland Trail Blazers in the 2009–2010 season. With injuries to fellow centers Greg Oden and Joel Przybilla, Camby helped the team secure a playoff berth as the Western Conference's sixth seed. On April 12, 2010, in a game in Portland against the Oklahoma City Thunder Camby led the team in scoring with 30 points and grabbed 13 rebounds. On April 20, 2010, he signed a two-year contract extension to stay with the Blazers.

On January 27, 2012, Camby became only the second-ever NBA player (Dennis Rodman being the first) to snare 20 or more rebounds but score zero points in a game, in a 109-71 win over the Phoenix Suns.

=== Houston Rockets (2012) ===
Camby was traded at the deadline on March 15, 2012, to the Houston Rockets in exchange for Jonny Flynn, Hasheem Thabeet and a second round draft pick.

=== Return to Knicks (2012–2013) ===
On July 11, 2012, Camby was traded to the New York Knicks in a sign-and-trade deal that also involved Toney Douglas, Josh Harrellson, Jerome Jordan, and two future draft picks going to the Rockets. He missed most of the 2012–13 season with a strained plantar fascia in his left foot, playing only 24 games.

On July 10, 2013, Camby, Steve Novak, Quentin Richardson, a future first round draft pick, and two future second round draft picks were traded from the Knicks to the team that drafted him 2nd overall in 1996, the Toronto Raptors in exchange for Andrea Bargnani. The Raptors then bought out Camby's contract.

On July 29, 2013, Camby re-signed with the Houston Rockets. However, he was waived by the Rockets on October 28, 2013.

== NBA career statistics ==
Legend
GP	Games played	GS	Games started	MPG	Minutes per game
FG%	Field goal percentage	3P%	3-point field goal percentage	FT%	Free throw percentage
RPG	Rebounds per game	APG	Assists per game	SPG	Steals per game
BPG	Blocks per game	PPG	Points per game	**Bold**	Career high
*	Led the league

=== Regular season ===
Year	Team	GP	GS	MPG	FG%	3P%	FT%	RPG	APG	SPG	BPG	PPG
1996–97	Toronto	63	38	30.1	.482	.143	.693	6.3	1.5	1.0	2.1	**14.8**
1997–98	Toronto	63	58	31.8	.412	.000	.611	7.4	1.8	1.1	**3.7***	12.1
1998–99	New York	46	0	20.5	.521	.000	.553	5.5	.3	.6	1.6	7.2
1999–00	New York	59	11	26.2	.480	**.500**	.670	7.8	.8	.7	2.0	10.2
2000–01	New York	63	63	33.8	**.524**	.125	.667	11.5	.8	1.0	2.2	12.0
2001–02	New York	29	29	34.7	.448	.000	.626	11.1	1.1	1.2	1.7	11.1
2002–03	Denver	29	9	21.2	.410	.400	.660	7.2	1.6	.7	1.4	7.6
2003–04	Denver	72	72	30.0	.477	.000	.721	10.1	1.8	1.2	2.6	8.6
2004–05	Denver	66	66	30.5	.465	.000	.723	10.0	2.3	.9	3.0	10.3
2005–06	Denver	56	54	33.2	.465	.091	.712	11.9	2.1	**1.4**	3.3*	12.8
2006–07	Denver	70	70	33.8	.473	.000	**.729**	11.7	3.2	1.2	3.3*	11.2
2007–08	Denver	**79**	**79**	**34.9**	.450	.300	.708	**13.1**	**3.3**	1.1	3.6*	9.1
2008–09	L.A. Clippers	62	55	31.0	.512	.250	.725	11.1	2.0	.8	2.1	10.3
2009–10	L.A. Clippers	51	51	31.3	.466	.333	.659	12.1	3.0	1.4	1.9	7.7
2009–10	Portland	23	23	31.2	.497	.000	.581	11.1	1.5	1.1	2.0	7.0
2010–11	Portland	59	51	26.1	.398	.000	.614	10.3	2.1	.7	1.6	4.7
2011–12	Portland	40	40	22.4	.416	.000	.474	8.8	1.9	.8	1.4	3.8
2011–12	Houston	19	13	24.1	.484	.400	.423	9.3	1.7	.9	1.5	7.1
2012–13	New York	24	4	10.4	.321	.000	.421	3.3	.6	.3	.6	1.8
Career		973	786	29.5	.466	.205	.670	9.8	1.9	1.0	2.4	9.5

=== Playoffs ===
Year	Team	GP	GS	MPG	FG%	3P%	FT%	RPG	APG	SPG	BPG	PPG
1999	New York	**20**	3	25.5	.566	.000	.616	7.7	.3	1.2	1.9	10.4
2000	New York	16	0	24.1	.337	.000	.613	7.0	.4	.5	1.4	4.8
2001	New York	4	4	35.3	.385	.000	.385	8.0	1.8	.5	2.3	6.3
2004	Denver	5	5	**38.8**	.491	.500	.571	11.4	2.4	.8	1.4	**12.6**
2005	Denver	5	5	36.8	.415	.000	.630	11.2	1.8	.6	**3.2***	10.2
2006	Denver	5	5	35.0	.419	.000	.556	11.0	2.2	.8	2.8*	11.4
2007	Denver	5	5	36.8	.378	.000	**.667**	**14.8**	2.0	.8	**3.2***	7.6
2008	Denver	4	4	31.0	.238	**1.000**	.333	13.3	**3.0**	1.0	3.0	3.3
2010	Portland	6	**6**	29.7	.421	.000	.500	10.0	2.3	.7	1.2	5.8
2011	Portland	6	**6**	27.8	.455	**1.000**	.000	9.7	1.3	.7	1.5	3.5
2013	New York	3	0	1.0	**1.000**	.000	.000	.7	.0	.0	.0	.7
Career		79	43	28.4	.443	.429	.578	9.0	1.2	.8	1.9	7.5

== Awards and honors ==
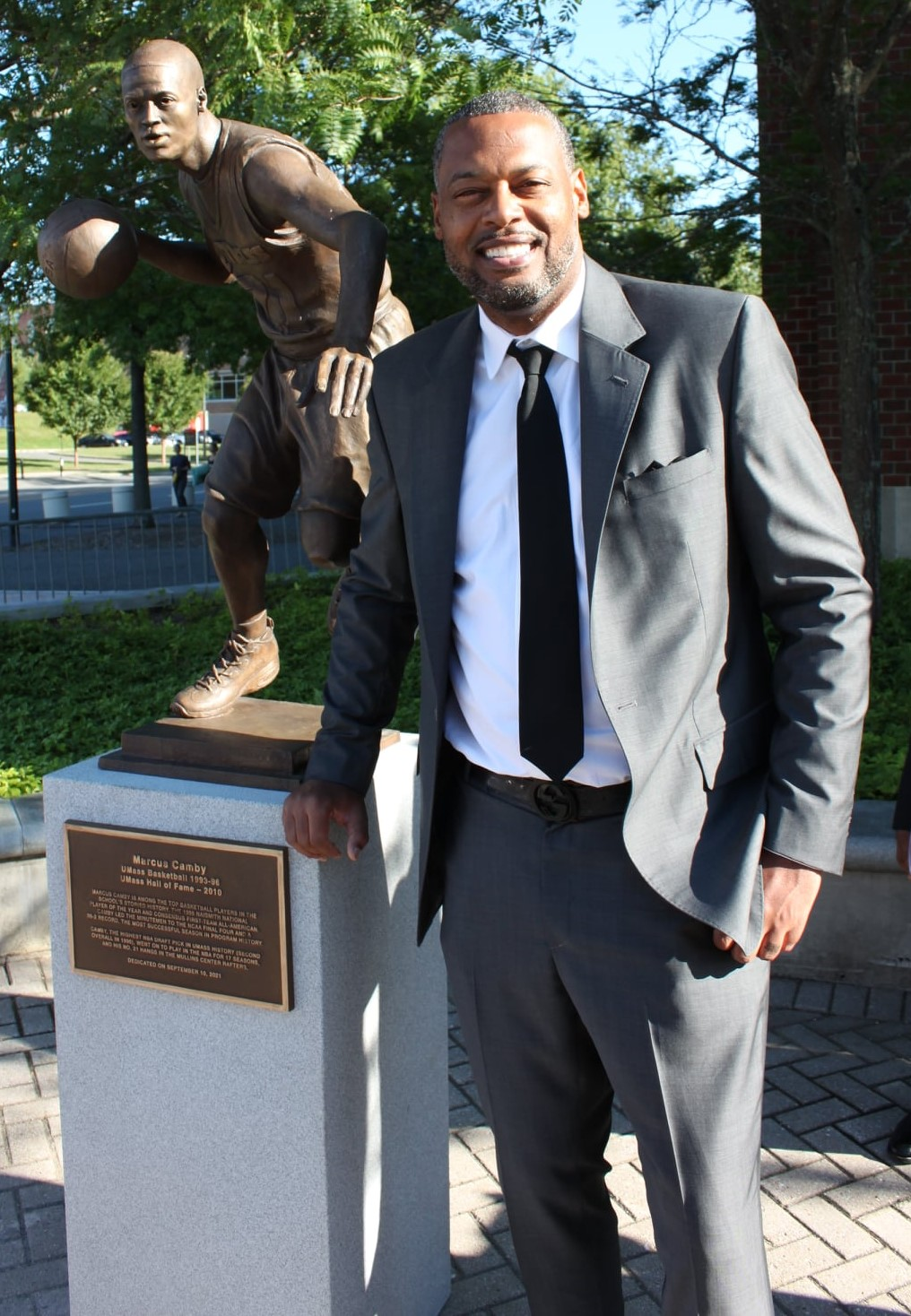
Camby poses next to his statue at the UMass dedication ceremony on September 10, 2021.

- NBA Defensive Player of the Year Award (2006–07)
- NBA All-Defensive First Team (2006–07, 2007–08)
- NBA All-Defensive Second Team (2004–05, 2005–06)
- NBA All-Rookie First Team (1996–97)
- Holds the distinction of having won a major award (DPOY) without being named to an All-Star team
- John R. Wooden Award (1995–96)
- Naismith College Player of the Year Award (1995–96)
- Oscar Robertson Trophy (1995–96)
- The Sporting News College Player of the Year
- Associated Press First-Team All-American (1995–96)
- UPI First-Team All-American (1995–96)
- Basketball Weekly First-Team All-American (1995–96)
- NCAA East Regional Most Outstanding Player (1995–96)
- All-Atlantic 10 First Team (1993–94, 1994–95, 1995–96)
- Atlantic 10 Freshman of the Year (1993–94)
- New Haven Register All-State Team (1992–1993)

== Off the court ==
=== Personal life ===
Camby lives in Pearland, TX - a suburb of Houston, TX.

=== Charitable ===
Camby tutored South Hadley students while at UMass, and was active with charities throughout his career. He was active with several Denver-area charities as a Nugget. As a pro he also toured Africa with Basketball Without Borders.

In 1996, Camby established the Cambyland Foundation, a non-profit organization. Cambyland partners with school and community organizations to provide opportunities for young people.

=== Kidnapping incident ===
On April 23, 2001, Camby's mother and two sisters were taken hostage in their own home by Hartford resident Troy Crooms. Crooms, who was charged with kidnapping, first-degree sexual assault, burglary and possession of a weapon, held them at knife-point over an eight-hour-long stand-off with police. Camby himself was at the scene with police during the stand-off. Crooms eventually pleaded guilty to first-degree sexual assault, second-degree burglary and violating probation. After initially facing 95 years in prison, Crooms was sentenced to 18 years in prison.

== See also ==
- List of NBA career blocks leaders
- List of NBA career rebounding leaders
- List of NBA annual blocks leaders
- List of NBA single-game blocks leaders
- Toronto Raptors accomplishments and records
