= Chauncey Billups =

American basketball player and coach (born 1976)

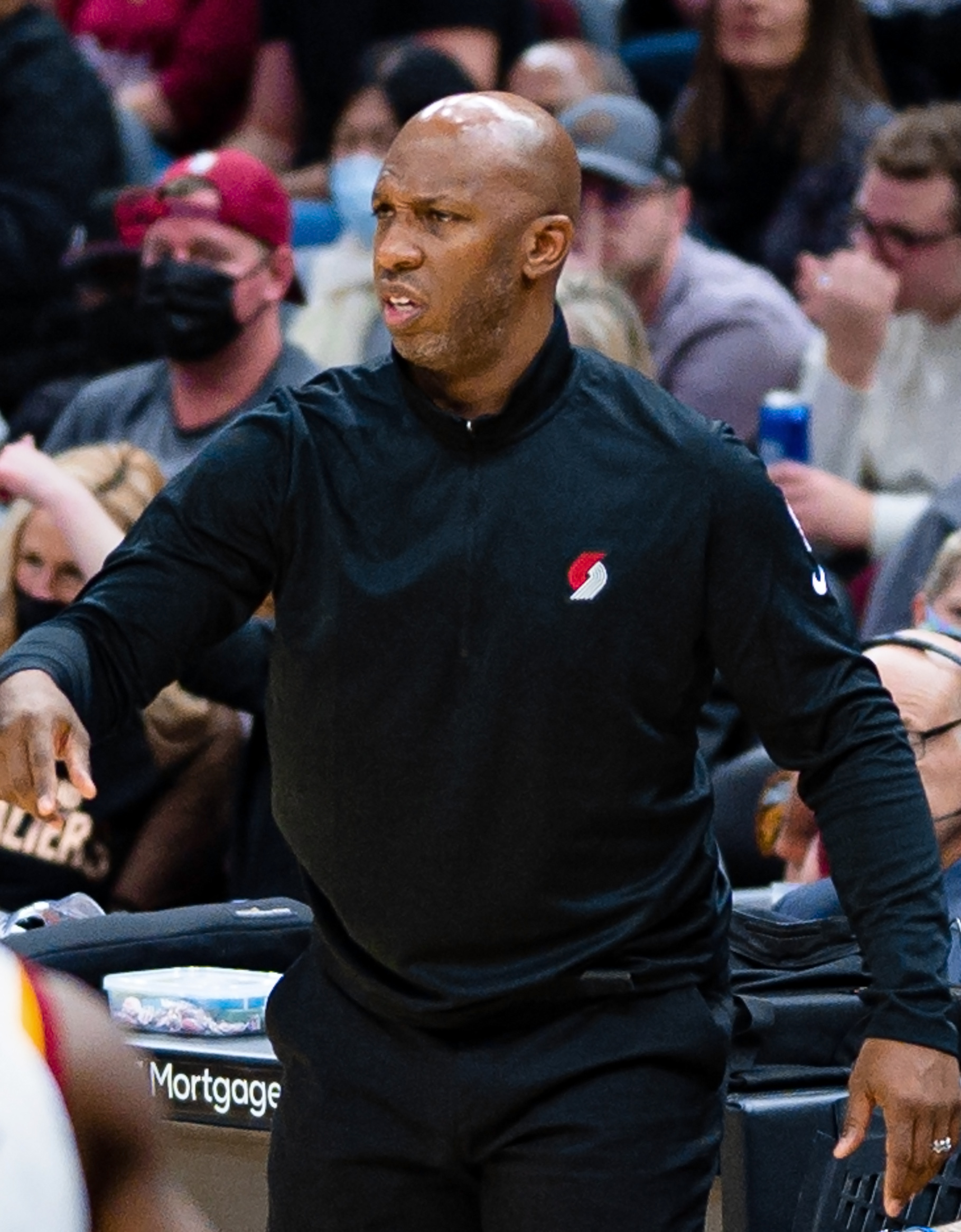
- Billups coaching the Portland Trail Blazers in 2021

Personal information
- Born: September 25, 1976 (age 50) Denver, Colorado, U.S.
- Listed height: 6 ft 3 in (1.91 m)
- Listed weight: 210 lb (95 kg)

Career information
- High school: George Washington (Denver, Colorado)
- College: Colorado (1995–1997)
- NBA draft: 1997: 1st round, 3rd overall pick
- Drafted by: Boston Celtics
- Playing career: 1997–2014
- Position: Point guard
- Number: 4, 3, 1, 7
- Coaching career: 2020–present

Career history

Playing
- 1997–1998: Boston Celtics
- 1998–1999: Toronto Raptors
- 1999–2000: Denver Nuggets
- 2000–2002: Minnesota Timberwolves
- 2002–2008: Detroit Pistons
- 2008–2011: Denver Nuggets
- 2011: New York Knicks
- 2011–2013: Los Angeles Clippers
- 2013–2014: Detroit Pistons

Coaching
- 2020–2021: Los Angeles Clippers (assistant)
- 2021–2025: Portland Trail Blazers

Career highlights
- NBA champion (2004); NBA Finals MVP (2004); 5× NBA All-Star (2006–2010); All-NBA Second Team (2006); 2× All-NBA Third Team (2007, 2009); 2× NBA All-Defensive Second Team (2005, 2006); No. 1 retired by Detroit Pistons; Consensus second-team All-American (1997); First-team All-Big 12 (1997); No. 4 retired by Colorado Buffaloes; McDonald's All-American (1995); Second-team Parade All-American (1995); Fourth-team Parade All-American (1994); 3× Mr. Colorado Basketball (1993–1995)

Career statistics
- Points: 15,802 (15.2 ppg)
- Rebounds: 2,992 (2.9 rpg)
- Assists: 5,636 (5.4 apg)
- Stats at NBA.com
- Stats at Basketball Reference
- Basketball Hall of Fame
Medals
Men's basketball
Representing the United States
FIBA Americas Championship
Gold medal – first place	2007 Las Vegas	Team competition
FIBA World Championship
Gold medal – first place	2010 Turkey	Team competition

Chauncey Ray Billups (born September 25, 1976) is an American professional basketball coach and former player who last served as the head coach of the Portland Trail Blazers of the National Basketball Association (NBA).

After playing college basketball with the Colorado Buffaloes, he was selected third overall in the 1997 NBA draft by the Boston Celtics. A point guard, Billups played for seven NBA franchises over his 17-year basketball career, most notably the Detroit Pistons, for whom he won the NBA Finals MVP in 2004 after helping the Pistons beat the Los Angeles Lakers in the Finals. He was given the nickname "Mr. Big Shot" for making late-game shots with Detroit. A five-time NBA All-Star, a three-time All-NBA selection, and two-time NBA All-Defensive selection, Billups also played for the Toronto Raptors, Denver Nuggets, Minnesota Timberwolves, New York Knicks, and Los Angeles Clippers during his NBA career. He was inducted into the Naismith Memorial Basketball Hall of Fame in 2024.

Billups worked as a studio analyst after his retiring from playing in 2014. The Pistons retired his No. 1 jersey in 2016. He started coaching as an assistant for the Los Angeles Clippers during the 2020–21 season. Billups was appointed as head coach of the Trail Blazers in 2021.

In October 2025, Billups was arrested by the FBI for his alleged involvement in an illegal gambling scheme. He was subsequently suspended indefinitely by the NBA.

== High school career ==
Born in Denver, Colorado, Billups graduated from George Washington High School in 1995. At George Washington, he was a four-time All-State first team pick, Colorado Mr. Basketball three times, and Colorado Player of the Year as a sophomore and as a junior. He started on varsity as a freshman. He was selected to the 1995 McDonald's All-American Team but did not play due to a shoulder injury. In 2013, he was inducted into the National High School Hall of Fame.

== College career ==
For college, Billups chose the University of Colorado Boulder over Kansas, Georgia Tech, University of California-Berkeley and Oklahoma State. He averaged 18.5 points, 5.1 assists and 5.6 rebounds per game over his two seasons with the Buffaloes. In the 1996–97 season, he was named to the All-Big 12 Conference First Team, the Basketball Times All-American First Team, and Consensus 2nd team All-American. That same season, Colorado finished second in the Big 12 conference with an overall record of 22–10. Billups then led the Buffaloes to their first NCAA tournament appearance in 28 years. As a 9-seed, Billups and the Buffalos upset the 8-seed Indiana Hoosiers 80–62 but then lost to the North Carolina Tar Heels 56–73. Billups averaged 17.5 points, 5.5 rebounds and 3.0 assists per game.

=== College awards and honors ===
- Consensus second-team All-American (1997)
- All-Big 12 First Team (1997)
- AllBuffs.com All-Time Colorado Buffaloes Men's Basketball Team
- No. 4 retired by University of Colorado

== Professional career ==
=== Boston Celtics (1997–1998) ===
Billups was drafted third overall in the 1997 NBA draft by the Boston Celtics. He did not mesh with new Celtics head coach Rick Pitino. In his first career game, Billups recorded 15 points, 2 rebounds and 4 assists in 16 minutes of playing time as a reserve in a win against the Michael Jordan-led Bulls. In his eighth career game, Billups posted a then career-high 22 points, on 5-for-14 shooting from the field and 9-for-10 from the free throw line, to go along with 3 assists and 4 steals, in a 103–99 win over the visiting Raptors. Years later, Billups reflected on his stint in Boston, commenting, "That didn't help. That didn't give me a chance to really slow down and listen to myself, listen to the game and what's going on. I never really had that chance. It was a recipe for disaster there." In addition, the Celtics coaching staff did not know whether to play him as a point guard or shooting guard. Fifty-one games later, Billups was traded to the Toronto Raptors on the trade deadline.

=== Toronto Raptors (1998–1999) ===
On February 18, 1998, Billups was traded to the Toronto Raptors, along with Roy Rogers, Dee Brown and John Thomas in exchange for All-Star point guard Kenny Anderson, Žan Tabak and Popeye Jones. On February 22, in just his second career game with the Raptors, Billups recorded a then-career high of 27 points on 5-for-13 shooting from the field and 13-for-16 from the free throw line, to go along with 2 rebounds and 5 assists in a 113–105 win over the Vancouver Grizzlies. On March 3, Billups recorded 26 points to go along with 5 rebounds and 6 assists in a 93–108 loss to the visiting Utah Jazz. On April 14, Billups recorded 19 points, 6 rebounds and 4 assists in a 96–92 road win over the New Jersey Nets.

=== Denver Nuggets (1999–2000) ===
On January 21, 1999, Billups was dealt to his hometown Denver Nuggets in a three-way deal involving one of Billups's future teams, the Minnesota Timberwolves. Minnesota received Dean Garrett and Bobby Jackson from Denver, Toronto received future teammate Željko Rebrača and Micheal Williams from Minnesota and the 5th pick in the 1999 NBA draft from Denver, and Billups, along with Tyson Wheeler, were sent to Denver from Toronto. Three months into his first tenure with the Nuggets, Billups visited a local Denver hospital in order to comfort and inspire Patrick Ireland, a victim of the 1999 Columbine High School Shooting Massacre. A year later, on February 1, 2000, Billups was traded to the Orlando Magic along with Ron Mercer and Johnny Taylor in exchange for Chris Gatling, Tariq Abdul-Wahad, a future first-round pick and cash.

Billups was on the injured list until season's end due to an injured shoulder and never played a game for the Magic. Despite this, he was included in the season-ending team photo. Among NBA circles, Billups was considered a draft bust.

=== Minnesota Timberwolves (2000–2002) ===
Billups was signed on a three-year, $7.4 million contract by the Minnesota Timberwolves (who had been involved in the trade that sent Billups to Denver) as a back-up to then point guard Terrell Brandon, who would mentor the troubled player alongside Sam Mitchell, Wally Szczerbiak and Kevin Garnett. Billups would work with his more experienced teammates on shooting, scouting, decision-making and the other attributes that came with playing point guard in the NBA, such as learning to work more effectively with teammates and deciding which plays would be most beneficial for the team in a specific situation.

In his first career game with the Timberwolves, Billups recorded 15 points, 2 rebounds and 5 assists in a 106–98 road win over the Houston Rockets. On November 11, 2000, Billups recorded his season-high in terms of points scored with 31 points to go along with 5 rebounds and 9 assists in a 103–92 road win over the Bucks.

During the 2001–02 season, Brandon suffered a serious knee injury. Billups replaced him and had a breakthrough 2001–02 season. The Timberwolves won 50 games before they were swept by the Dallas Mavericks in the first round of the playoffs, with Billups averaging 22 points per game in the series.

=== Detroit Pistons (2002–2008) ===
==== First year in Detroit (2002–2003) ====
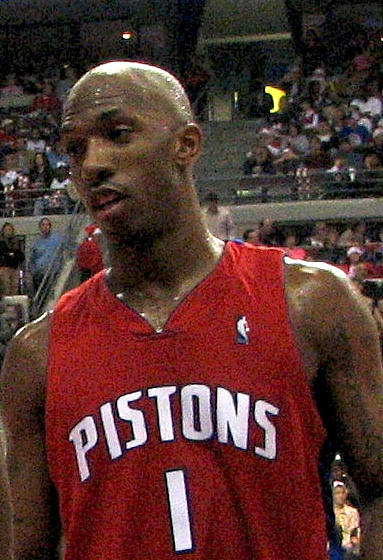
Billups with the Detroit Pistons in 2005

After his breakthrough season, Billups became a free agent. Billups wanted to return to the Timberwolves, but the team wanted to see how Brandon would respond to his knee injury.

In July 2002, Billups signed a 6-year, $34 million contract with the Detroit Pistons to be the team's new starting point guard. When he signed with the Pistons, he was forced to take the number 1 because number 4 was retired in honor of Joe Dumars. Billups quickly earned respect from Pistons fans and colleagues for his tenacious defense and clutch shooting.

In 2002–03, Billups helped Detroit finish first overall in the Eastern Conference with a 50–32 regular season record. Billups earned the nickname "Mr. Big-Shot" during the regular season for two events. He first made a game winning three on March 9 as time expired to beat the Golden State Warriors 107–105 and Billups scored 31 points. The second event was just over two weeks later on March 26. The Pistons were tied in overtime with the Atlanta Hawks 99–99 until Billups made a top-of-the-key triple with 0.5 seconds left to win the game. Billups finished with 22 points against the Hawks. In the 2003 playoffs, the top-seed Pistons surprisingly fell behind the upstart 8-seed Orlando Magic in the first-round series 3 games to 1. In game 5, Billups played a contributing role in his team's dominating 98–67 victory by scoring 15 points, tied for second on the Pistons. Having helped the Pistons stave off elimination in game 5, Billups scored 40 points in game 6 to help the Pistons force a seventh game. In the decisive game 7, Billups scored 37 points to help clinch the series 4–3.

Detroit then beat the Philadelphia 76ers in the Eastern Conference Semifinals, 4–2, to advance to the Eastern Conference Finals. However, Detroit was swept by the New Jersey Nets, 4–0. Rick Carlisle was fired as the head coach in the offseason and Larry Brown was hired.

==== Championship season and Finals MVP (2003–2004) ====
In the 2004 season, Billups averaged 16.9 points, 5.7 assists, 3.5 rebounds and 1.1 steals per game. The Pistons improved their record to 54–28, but it was only good for the third seed overall in the Eastern Conference playoff standings.

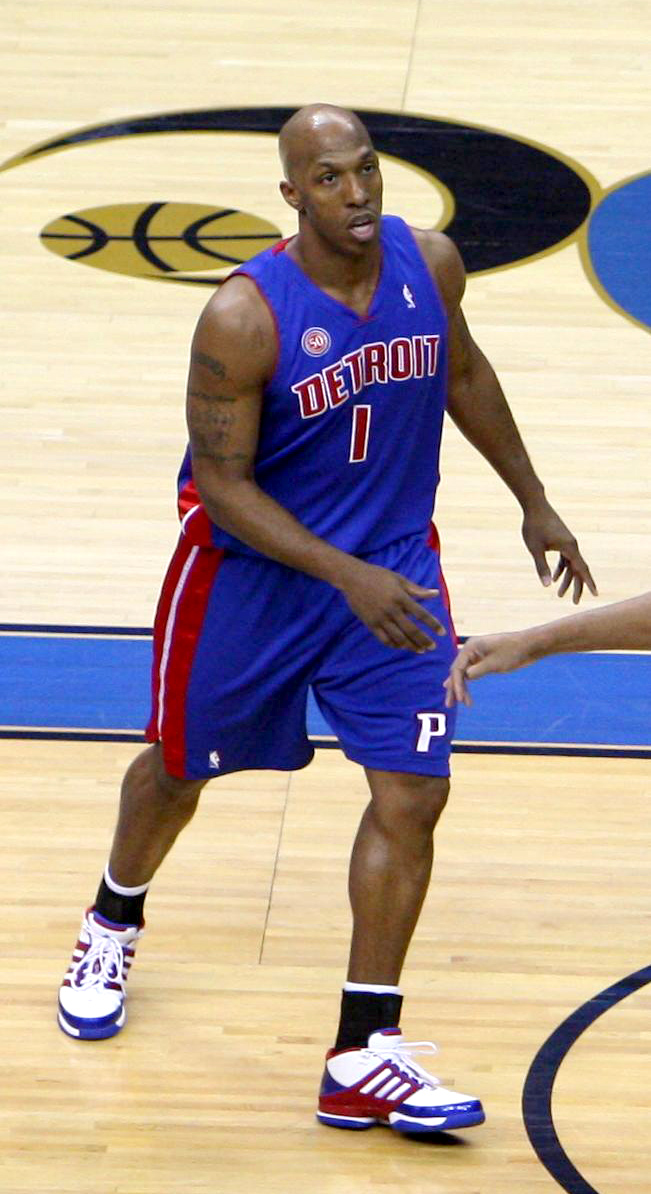
Billups in 2008

In the pivotal game 3 during the first round series against the Milwaukee Bucks, which was tied 1–1, Billups led all scorers with 21 points and finished the scoring for his team by sinking 4 of 4 free throws in the final 31.2 seconds. These free throws were a key part of the Pistons effort to stave off the Bucks' relentless defense which kept Detroit from scoring a normal field goal during the last 5:34. In the Eastern Conference Semifinals versus the defending Eastern Conference Champions the New Jersey Nets, Billups banked in a half-court three as time expired in game 5 to send the game into overtime. The Pistons would lose in triple overtime. Finally, he helped Detroit overcome a 3–2 series deficit to win the series, 4–3.

In the Eastern Conference Finals against the Indiana Pacers, the Pistons won the gritty, defensive series, 4–2, by an average score of 75.2 PPG to the Pacers' 72.7 PPG.

Billups helped Detroit win the 2004 NBA Finals over the heavily favored Los Angeles Lakers, 4–1. He averaged per game 21 points, 5.2 assists, 3.2 rebounds, 1.2 steals, as well as shooting 50.1 percent field goals, 47.1 percent three-pointers and 92.9 percent free throws to earn the NBA Finals MVP Award. Billups said of his MVP award, "Everybody deserves this. Not just me. I wish I could turn it into thirteen pieces and give a little bit to everybody."

==== Back-to-back All-Defensive honors (2004–2006) ====
The following season, Billups was named to the 2005 NBA Second All-Defensive Team, along with teammate Tayshaun Prince, while teammate and co-captain of the Pistons Ben Wallace took home the Defensive Player of the Year Award. The Pistons reached the 2005 NBA Finals but lost in their bid to repeat as champions to the San Antonio Spurs in seven games.

In 2006, Billups was co-captain of the team. Billups was selected to play in the 2006 NBA All-Star Game as a reserve for the Eastern Conference, along with teammates Rip Hamilton, Rasheed Wallace and Ben Wallace. Pistons head coach Flip Saunders coached the Eastern Conference squad and put all four Pistons in the game when the east was falling behind; they were able to get the Eastern All-Star team back in the game. During the 2006 NBA All-Star Weekend, Billups participated in the Three-point Shootout contest. He was eliminated in the first round of the contest after scoring 12 points. Billups called this moment when all four Pistons entered the game at the same time, one of the highlight moments of his career. Although he captained the Pistons to a franchise best 64–18 record, they failed to make it to the NBA Finals for the first time in three years.

==== Final seasons in Detroit (2006–2008) ====
In the 2007 NBA All-Star Game, Billups was chosen as a reserve, along with teammate Rip Hamilton, for the Eastern Conference, despite an injury that kept Billups out of five games early on in the season. Billups also took part in the Shooting Stars Competition alongside former Piston and Detroit Shock head coach Bill Laimbeer and Shock star Swin Cash. Team Detroit won the competition with Billups hitting the final half-court shot.

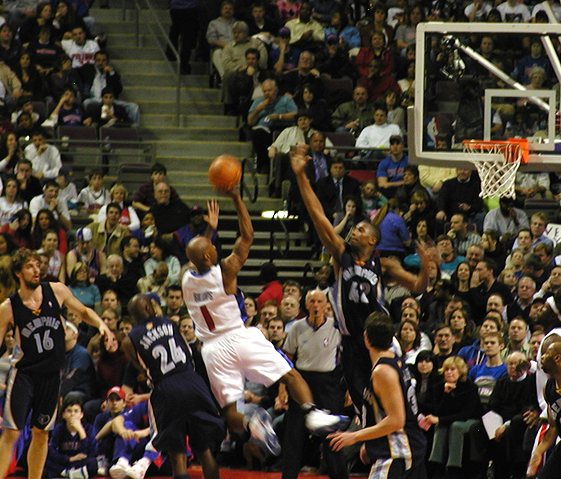
Billups taking a shot in a game against the Memphis Grizzlies, 2006

On July 11, 2007, Billups signed a $46 million, four-year contract with the Pistons (which includes a team option for a fifth year at $14 million). He had been an unrestricted free agent for several days after he opted out of the previous contract, which he had signed in 2002. Billups was selected to play as a reserve in the 2008 NBA All-Star Game, along with teammates Richard Hamilton and Rasheed Wallace, an injury replacement.

In the first round of the 2008 NBA playoffs, during game 3 against the Orlando Magic, Billups injured his right hamstring when Orlando Magic guard Jameer Nelson tangled with Billup's left leg on a drive to the bucket. Billups would sit for the 3 remaining games of the series. Billups and the Pistons again made it to the Eastern Conference Finals against the Celtics, but lost the series, 4–2, to the eventual champions.

=== Return to Denver (2008–2011) ===
On November 3, 2008, Billups was traded back to his hometown team the Denver Nuggets along with Antonio McDyess and Cheikh Samb for Allen Iverson. Pistons GM Joe Dumars said that it was "the hardest and toughest" move he had made as a general manager, describing Billups as "... a guy that I have looked at as a little brother."

Billups chose the #7 jersey to honor Denver Broncos quarterback John Elway, since two of his other favorite numbers, 1 and 4, were already worn by J. R. Smith and Kenyon Martin, respectively. He played his first game of the Nuggets' 2008–09 season on November 7, 2008. He recorded 15 points, four rebounds and three assists in 30 minutes of play in a 108–105 Nuggets' home win. Billups was the only Nugget to be selected to the 2009 NBA All-Star Game. He finished the season averaging 17.7 points and 6.4 assists per game.

With Billups and Carmelo Anthony, the Nuggets accomplished a number of franchise milestones. Their 54–28 record matched a franchise record, and their 27–14 start was also a franchise record for wins in the first half of a season. This also marked the first time in the franchise's history the team had gotten 50 wins in back-to-back seasons. They led the Northwest division for much of the season, eventually winning the division and gaining the number two seed in the Western Conference, matching the highest the team had ever been seeded for the playoffs. In the first round, they defeated the New Orleans Hornets in 5 games, which included a record-equaling 58-point margin of victory. Billups also set a Nuggets franchise record with the most three-pointers in a playoff game with 8, and his 19 three-pointers in total is a Nuggets record for threes made in a playoff series. In his first year with the Nuggets, Billups led them back to the NBA Conference Finals for the first time since 1985. They would play the Lakers for the second straight year (the Lakers had swept them in the first round the year before). The Nuggets would ultimately lose the series 4–2. This was Billups's 7th straight conference finals. He joined Magic Johnson, Michael Cooper, Kareem Abdul-Jabbar and Kurt Rambis as the only players to accomplish this feat since the Boston Celtics of the 1950s and 1960s led by Bill Russell. Billups finished the season sixth in voting for the 2009 NBA Most Valuable Player Award. He was also selected to his second All-NBA Third Team.

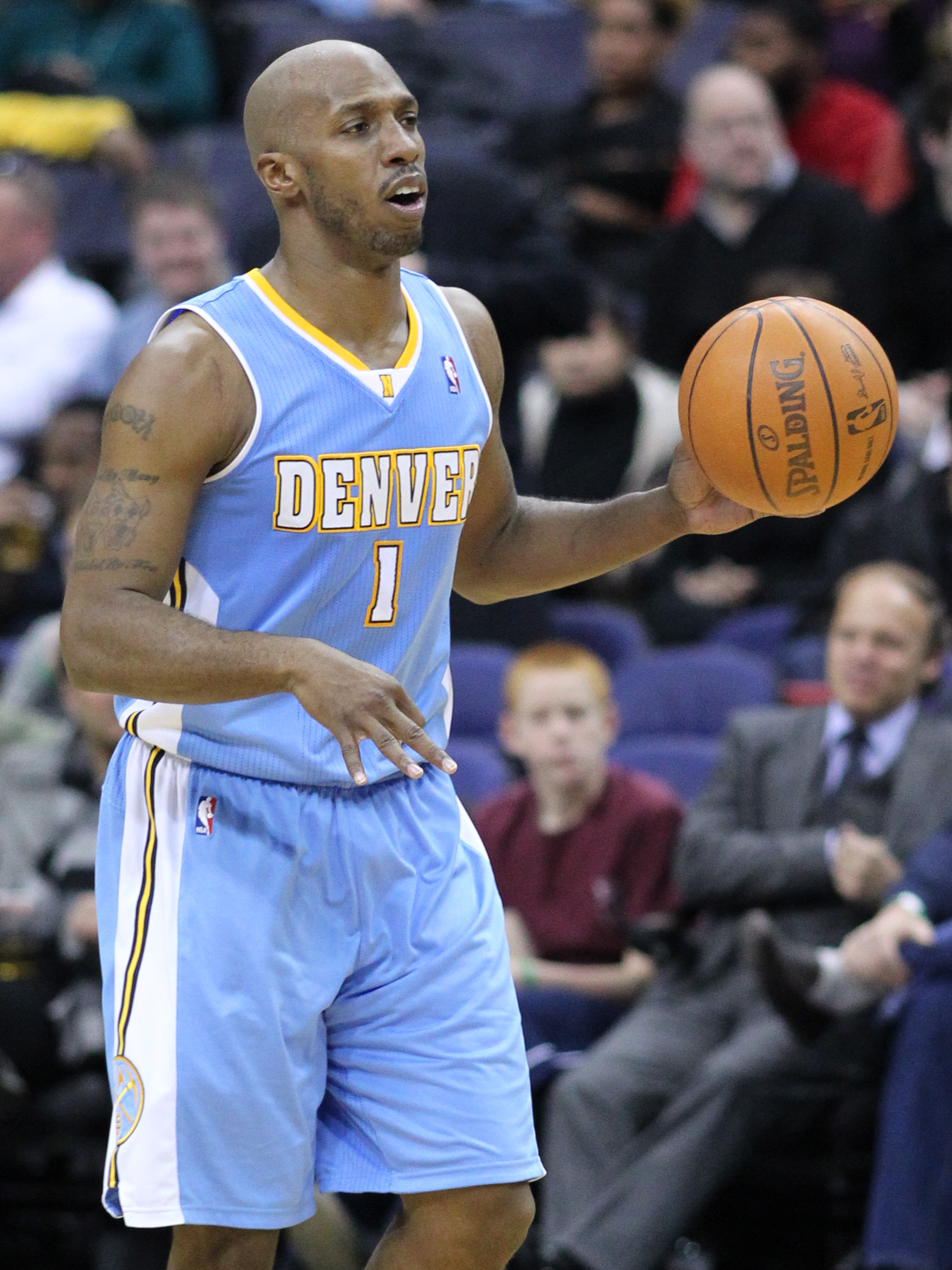
Billups with the Denver Nuggets in 2011

For the 2009–10 season, Billups reverted to wearing #1, the same number he wore with the Pistons. Teammate J. R. Smith, who had previously worn #1 since being acquired by the Nuggets in 2006, changed to the #5 jersey. On November 27, 2009, in the Nuggets' 128–125 win over the New York Knicks, Billups scored 32 points while teammate Carmelo Anthony scored 50. This made them only the third duo in NBA history to score at least 30 and 50 points, respectively. On February 5, 2010, Billups set a career high in points with a 39-point performance in a road win over the Los Angeles Lakers with 27 of them coming from 9 three-pointers. Billups was chosen as the replacement by David Stern for injured New Orleans Hornets point guard Chris Paul at the 2010 NBA All-Star Game. During the 2010–11 season, he averaged 16.5 points, 5.3 assists and 2.5 rebounds in 32.3 minutes per game. His .441 three-point field goal percentage was a career high.

=== New York Knicks (2011) ===
Despite publicly professing his desire to finish his career in hometown Denver and retire as a member of the Nuggets, Billups was traded to the New York Knicks on February 22, 2011 as part of the Carmelo Anthony deal. Billups was "collateral damage"—as more than one sportswriter put it—of Carmelo Anthony's desire to play in New York and the Nuggets' desire to trade Anthony before he became a free agent. "Oh it was hard, hardest thing I've ever had to do", Billups said. "I had to tell my girls that daddy was traded, that he was leaving to play across the country. I told them it wasn't my choice, that nothing could be done about it. I had to go. It wasn't a happy scene."

The Knicks finished 42–40 and clinched the sixth seed in the Eastern Conference and made the playoffs for the first time since 2004. Billups suffered a knee injury while playing against the Celtics in game 1 of the 2011 NBA Playoffs. The injury would keep Billups sidelined for the remainder of the playoffs.

Shortly after the Knicks were eliminated from the playoffs by the Boston Celtics, Billups mentioned he would love to return to the Knicks next season. "I would love the opportunity to really try it up with these guys", Billups said. "Not like play 30 games after a trade, like really have a season. Have an opportunity to really get a fair shake with these guys. I would love to." In December 2011, the Knicks used their amnesty clause on Billups and put him on waivers, ending his tenure with the Knicks.

=== Los Angeles Clippers (2011–2013) ===
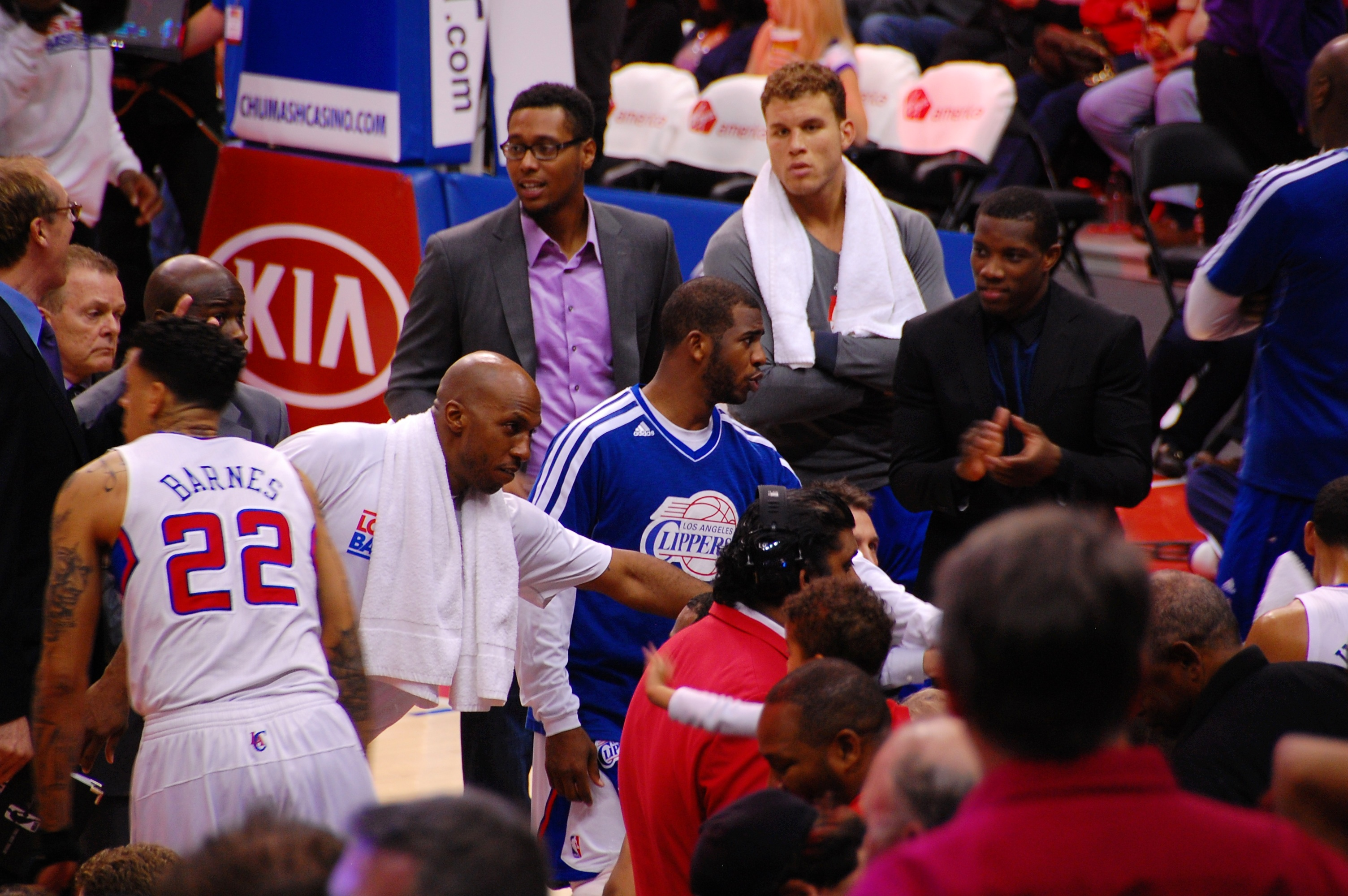
Billups (center-left, with towel) with the Clippers in 2013

After his tenure with the Knicks came to an end, Billups became an unrestricted free agent. Many believed that a contender like the Miami Heat or the Los Angeles Lakers would end up acquiring Billups. However, on December 12, 2011, the Los Angeles Clippers claimed him off waivers. Billups indicated that he did not want to be picked up by a team that was not contending for a championship and said he would retire if he was, pushing the NBA to warn him and his agent that he would be "in breach of his contract" if he did not show up. However, the Clippers ended up trading for the Hornets' superstar point guard Chris Paul two days later. After the Chris Paul trade, Billups said that he was happy to be with the Clippers, saying that "I think these guys are ready to take the next leap and hopefully I can help with that."

Billups, a point guard, was moved into the shooting guard position, which he was still getting used to when he was injured. On February 7, 2012, an MRI revealed a tear in Billups's Achilles tendon, ending his season after only 20 game appearances. Billups helped the Clippers beat Miami, Oklahoma City, Orlando and the Los Angeles Lakers en route to a 19–9 start.

On July 13, 2012, Billups re-signed with the Clippers on a one-year deal. He made his season debut on November 28, 2012, against the Minnesota Timberwolves. He was limited to only 22 games during the season because of various injuries, including a sore back and tendinitis in his left foot.

On June 10, 2013, Billups received the inaugural Twyman–Stokes Teammate of the Year Award. He was humbled by the award and said, "For my name to be mentioned with [Jack Twyman], I really don't feel worthy, to be honest with you. It's kind of embarrassing." During the 2012–13 season, Billups averaged a new career high free-throw percentage. He became a free agent after the season.

=== Return to Detroit (2013–2014) ===
On July 16, 2013, Billups signed a two-year, $5 million contract to return to the Detroit Pistons. More knee problems caused him to miss most of the 2013–14 season, as he appeared in his fewest games since the 1999–2000 season and averaged career lows in points, minutes, steals, field goal percentage and three-point percentage during the year. The Pistons finished the season at 29–53 and missed the postseason.

On June 30, 2014, the Pistons announced they would not pick up their team option on Billups's contract for the 2014–15 season.

On September 9, 2014, Billups announced his retirement from the NBA after 17 years. Billups cited his health as the main reason for his retirement, as he never appeared in more than 22 games in his last three seasons in the league.

On February 10, 2016, the Pistons retired Billups's No. 1 jersey.

== BIG3 ==
In 2017, the creation of the 3-on-3 professional basketball league BIG3 was announced, with Billups set to be a player for the Killer 3's. He ended up playing there for 2 seasons, rarely playing, before leaving.

== Coaching career ==
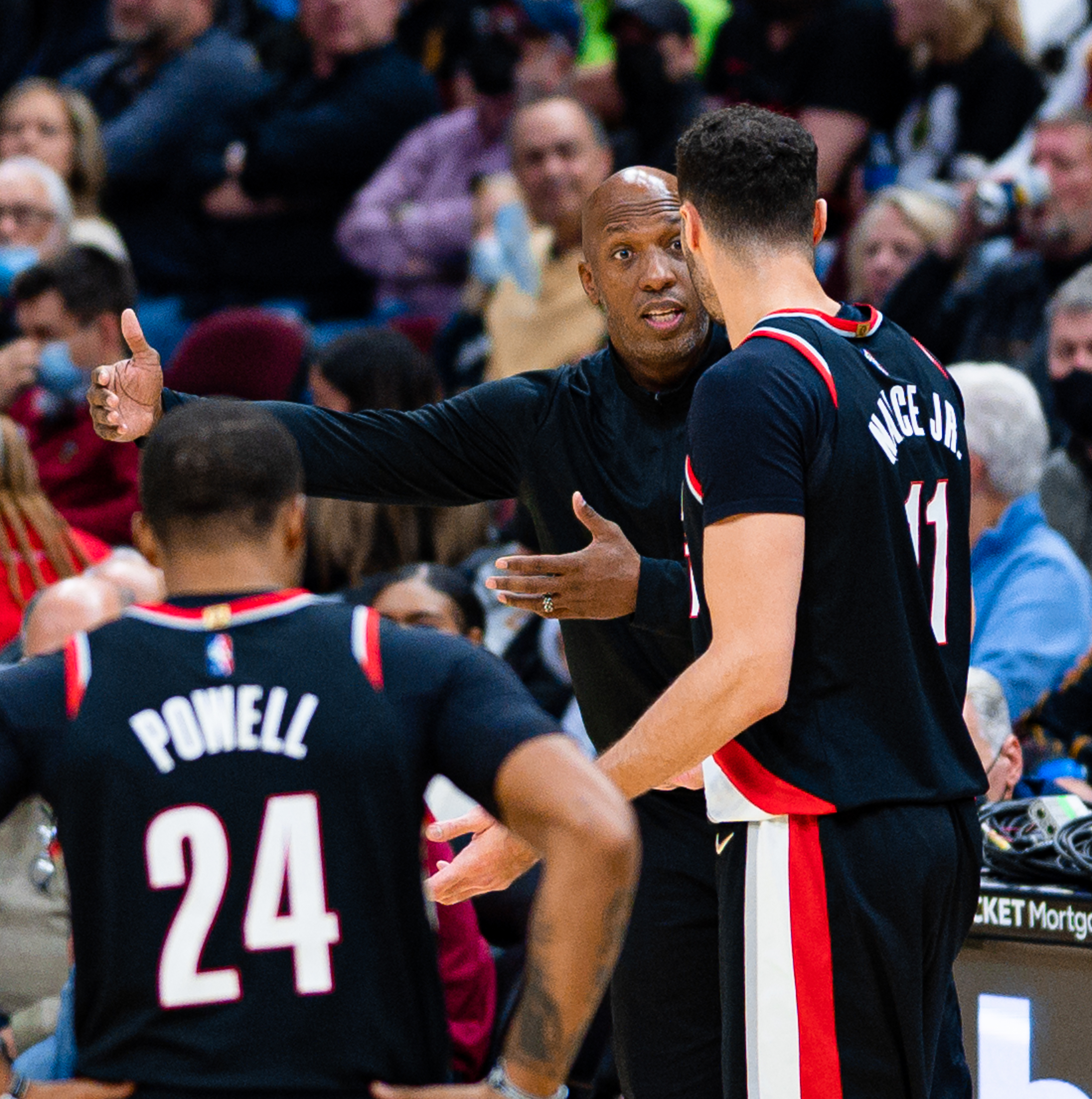
Billups as head coach of the Portland Trail Blazers, 2021

=== Los Angeles Clippers (2020–2021) ===
On November 16, 2020, Billups was hired as an assistant coach for the Los Angeles Clippers under head coach Tyronn Lue. Despite losing Kawhi Leonard to injury, the Clippers reached their first ever Conference Finals in franchise history that season.

=== Portland Trail Blazers (2021–2025) ===
On June 27, 2021, Billups was hired as head coach of the Portland Trail Blazers.

Coming to a team coming off eight straight playoff appearances, Billups failed to lead the team to the playoffs in any of his first four seasons. Despite this, on April 13, 2025, Billups and the Trail Blazers agreed to a multiyear contract extension.

On October 23, 2025, following his arrest as part of an investigation into illegal gambling, the NBA placed Billups on leave effective immediately just one game into the season. Assistant coach Tiago Splitter was named interim head coach and led the Trail Blazers to their first playoff appearance since Billups was hired.

== Career statistics ==
Legend
GP	Games played	GS	Games started	MPG	Minutes per game
FG%	Field goal percentage	3P%	3-point field goal percentage	FT%	Free throw percentage
RPG	Rebounds per game	APG	Assists per game	SPG	Steals per game
BPG	Blocks per game	PPG	Points per game	**Bold**	Career high
†	Won an NBA championship

=== Regular season ===
Year	Team	GP	GS	MPG	FG%	3P%	FT%	RPG	APG	SPG	BPG	PPG
1997–98	Boston	51	44	25.4	.390	.339	.817	2.2	4.3	**1.5**	.0	11.1
1997–98	Toronto	29	26	31.7	.349	.316	.919	2.7	3.3	1.0	.1	11.3
1998–99	Denver	45	41	33.1	.386	.362	.913	2.1	3.8	1.3	.3	13.9
1999–00	Denver	13	5	23.5	.337	.171	.841	2.6	3.0	.8	.2	8.6
2000–01	Minnesota	77	33	23.2	.422	.376	.842	2.1	3.4	.7	.1	9.3
2001–02	Minnesota	**82**	54	28.7	.423	.394	.885	2.8	5.5	.8	.2	12.5
2002–03	Detroit	74	74	31.4	.421	.392	.878	**3.7**	3.9	.9	.2	16.2
2003–04†	Detroit	78	78	35.4	.394	.388	.878	3.5	5.7	1.1	.1	16.9
2004–05	Detroit	80	80	35.8	.442	.426	.898	3.4	5.8	1.0	.1	16.5
2005–06	Detroit	81	**81**	36.1	.418	.433	.894	3.1	**8.6**	.9	.1	18.5
2006–07	Detroit	70	70	**36.2**	.427	.345	.883	3.4	7.2	1.2	.2	17.0
2007–08	Detroit	78	78	32.3	**.448**	.401	.918	2.7	6.8	1.3	.2	17.0
2008–09	Detroit	2	2	35.0	.333	.286	.918	5.0	7.5	**1.5**	**.5**	12.5
2008–09	Denver	77	77	35.3	.420	.410	.900	3.0	6.4	1.2	.2	17.9
2009–10	Denver	73	73	34.1	.418	.386	.910	3.1	5.6	1.1	.1	**19.5**
2010–11	Denver	51	51	32.3	.438	**.441**	.923	2.5	5.3	1.0	.2	16.5
2010–11	New York	21	21	31.6	.403	.328	.902	3.1	5.5	.9	.1	17.5
2011–12	L.A. Clippers	20	20	30.4	.364	.384	.895	2.5	4.0	.5	.2	15.0
2012–13	L.A. Clippers	22	22	19.0	.402	.367	**.938**	1.5	2.2	.5	.0	8.4
2013–14	Detroit	19	7	16.3	.304	.292	.833	1.5	2.2	.4	.1	3.8
Career		1043	937	31.6	.415	.387	.894	2.9	5.4	1.0	.2	15.2
All-Star		5	0	19.0	.455	.320	.750	2.2	5.0	.4	.0	10.2

=== Playoffs ===
Year	Team	GP	GS	MPG	FG%	3P%	FT%	RPG	APG	SPG	BPG	PPG
2001	Minnesota	3	0	8.7	.167	.000	**1.000**	1.7	.7	.0	.0	1.0
2002	Minnesota	3	3	**44.7**	.451	.400	.700	**5.0**	5.7	1.0	.3	**22.0**
2003	Detroit	14	14	34.6	.374	.310	.933	3.4	4.7	.6	.1	18.0
2004†	Detroit	23	23	38.3	.385	.346	.890	3.0	5.9	**1.3**	.1	16.4
2005	Detroit	**25**	**25**	39.4	.428	.349	.893	4.3	6.5	1.0	.2	18.7
2006	Detroit	18	18	39.2	.406	.340	.905	3.4	6.5	1.2	.1	17.9
2007	Detroit	16	16	40.6	.435	.389	.832	3.3	5.7	1.2	.1	18.6
2008	Detroit	15	15	32.0	.401	.375	.832	2.9	5.5	.8	.1	16.1
2009	Denver	16	16	38.7	**.457**	**.468**	.906	3.8	**6.8**	**1.3**	.3	20.6
2010	Denver	6	6	34.5	.446	.355	.881	2.3	6.3	1.0	**.5**	20.3
2011	New York	1	1	35.0	.273	.333	**1.000**	2.0	4.0	.0	.0	10.0
2013	L.A. Clippers	6	6	19.2	.306	.353	.818	2.0	1.0	.2	.2	6.2
Career		146	143	36.4	.411	.366	.880	3.4	5.7	1.0	.2	17.3

== Head coaching record ==
Legend
Regular season	G	Games coached	W	Games won	L	Games lost	W–L %	Win–loss %
Playoffs	PG	Playoff games	PW	Playoff wins	PL	Playoff losses	PW–L %	Playoff win–loss %

Team	Year	G	W	L	W–L%	Finish	PG	PW	PL	PW–L%	Result
Portland	2021–22	82	27	55	.329	4th in Northwest	—	—	—	—	Missed playoffs
Portland	2022–23	82	33	49	.402	5th in Northwest	—	—	—	—	Missed playoffs
Portland	2023–24	82	21	61	.256	5th in Northwest	—	—	—	—	Missed playoffs
Portland	2024–25	82	36	46	.439	4th in Northwest	—	—	—	—	Missed playoffs
Portland	2025–26	1	0	1	.000	(suspended)	—	—	—	—	—
Career		329	117	212	.356		0	0	0	–	

== National team career ==
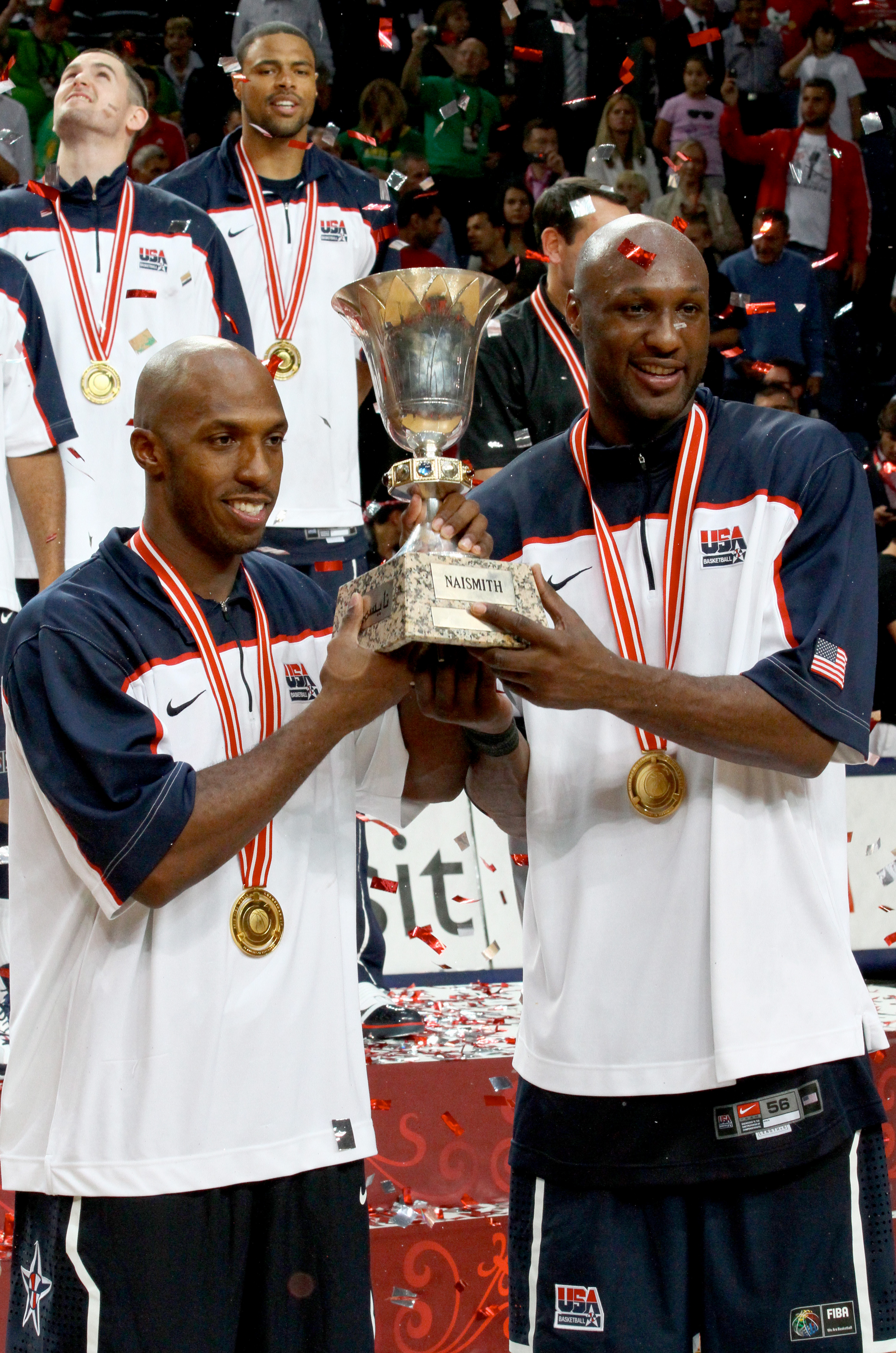
Billups (left) and Lamar Odom holding the 2010 FIBA World Championship trophy

On March 5, 2006, Billups was selected to be a part of the 2006–2008 USA Men's Senior National Team program developed to restore Team USA back to the top of the basketball world after disappointments in the 2002 FIBA World Championship and the 2004 Summer Olympic Games. After missing out in the 2006 FIBA World Championship for personal reasons, on August 20, 2007, Billups was selected to be a part of Team USA that competed at the 2007 FIBA Americas Championship, a qualifying tournament for the Beijing Olympics. Coming off the bench, he along with the other new members of the team including All-Star Kobe Bryant helped USA go unbeaten at the tournament held in Las Vegas and earn a spot at next Summer Olympics. On June 17, 2008, Billups announced he would not compete for a spot to be on the Olympic squad stating family reasons though he did say "they'll be fine. And when they win the gold, I'll feel like I had a big hand in regaining our dominance because of what we did last summer." During the tournament, Team USA went unbeaten on their way to their first gold medal since the 2000 Olympics, defeating Spain in the final. In 2010, Billups was named to the US men's team that won gold in the 2010 FIBA World Championship, averaging 9.8 points and 2.6 assists per game in the tournament.

== Television career ==
Billups joined ESPN in the 2014–15 NBA season as a studio analyst on SportsCenter and other programming. The following season, Billups joined NBA Countdown as a studio analyst on Wednesdays. In the ensuing three seasons, he began splitting time between the studio and working as a game analyst on selected telecasts. Finally, on August 16, 2019, Billups announced that he was exiting his role on NBA Countdown to become the game analyst on Los Angeles Clippers telecasts as part of that team's restructuring of the broadcast crew due to the retirement of longtime play-by-play announcer Ralph Lawler. Billups indicated that he would also continue to call selected NBA game telecasts on ESPN in addition to his duties with the Clippers.

== Personal life ==
Billups and his wife have three daughters. His younger brother, Rodney, played point guard for the University of Denver from 2002 to 2005, was drafted in the NBA Development League, played professionally in Europe, and went on to a coaching career, becoming head coach of the Denver Pioneers in 2016.

Billups is the first cousin of running back LenDale White. His second cousin Amir Billups of the Buffalo 716ers was killed in a 2015 car accident.

Billups wore the #4 through high school and college and at times during his professional career because he idolized former Pistons guard Joe Dumars, the Pistons' President of Basketball Operations during his time with Detroit. His favorite NFL team is the Denver Broncos.

Billups was featured on the cover of the video game NBA Ballers: Phenom and is the player's mentor.

On June 16, 2008, Billups appeared at Joe Louis Arena for a Barack Obama rally.

The Coors Events Center has a large mural of Billups in the northeast corner of the arena as part of his "Chauncey's Kid Roundup" program.

== Controversies ==
=== Rape allegation ===
In 1997, Billups and fellow former Boston Celtics player Ron Mercer were accused of raping a woman at the home of teammate Antoine Walker. According to a civil suit, Billups, Mercer and Walker's roommate Michael Irvin raped the woman at Walker's condo after leaving a Boston comedy club on November 9, 1997. A medical examination on the following day revealed injuries consistent with the victim's testimony. No criminal charges were filed, but Billups and Mercer settled a civil suit in 2000. Before he was hired as the head coach for the Portland Trail Blazers, the club asserted that they had investigated this allegation and concluded it did not disqualify him from taking the role.

=== Federal gambling investigation ===
On October 23, 2025, Billups was arrested as part of an ongoing federal gambling investigation by the FBI. According to reports, his arrest was connected to an illegal poker operation with alleged ties to organized crime. Authorities stated that the case was not related to any games he coached. Billups's alleged involvement primarily centered on participating in poker games that he knew were rigged. Earlier that same day, Miami Heat player Terry Rozier and former player Damon Jones were also taken into custody in connection with the investigation. More than 30 people were charged in the investigation.

The indictments alleged that the defendants were part of a sophisticated criminal conspiracy involving several members and associates of the Bonanno, Genovese, Gambino and Lucchese crime families in New York. Prosecutors claimed that the group organized rigged high-stakes poker games in cities including Las Vegas, Miami, Manhattan, and the Hamptons, where victims were enticed to play alongside former professional athletes such as Billups and Jones. Participants allegedly used concealed technology—including contact lenses and glasses designed to read marked cards, modified shuffling machines, and an X-ray table—to cheat players out of millions of dollars. Officials stated that when victims refused to pay their debts, members of the crime families resorted to threats and intimidation. The scheme is believed to have defrauded victims of approximately $7 million, according to federal authorities.

Although Billups was not directly named in Rozier's federal indictment, it reportedly referenced an unnamed "Co-Conspirator 8," described as an Oregon resident who played in the NBA from 1997 to 2014 and has been a coach since 2021—details matching Billups's career timeline. The indictment alleged that this individual provided inside information about a Trail Blazers game in March 2023, indicating the team would be tanking and that several players would be sidelined with injuries. Prosecutors claimed that this information was later used by other defendants to place bets against the Trail Blazers.

== See also ==
- List of NBA career 3-point scoring leaders
- List of NBA career free throw percentage leaders
- List of NBA career playoff 3-point scoring leaders
- List of NBA career playoff free throw scoring leaders
- List of people banned or suspended by the NBA
