= 1997–98 Toronto Raptors season =

NBA professional basketball team season

- Head coach: Darrell Walker (resigned); Butch Carter (interim)
- General manager: Isiah Thomas (through November 20, 1997); Glen Grunwald (after November 20, 1997)
- Owner: Allan Slaight
- Arena: SkyDome; Maple Leaf Gardens

Results
- Record: 16–66 (.195)
- Place: Division: 8th (Central); Conference: 15th (Eastern)
- Playoff finish: Did not qualify
- Stats at Basketball Reference

Local media
- Television: TSN; The Score; CKVR
- Radio: CFRB

The 1997–98 Toronto Raptors season was the third season for the Toronto Raptors in the National Basketball Association.

== Season summary ==
=== Off-season ===
The Raptors received the ninth overall pick in the 1997 NBA draft, and selected small forward, and high school basketball star Tracy McGrady. During the off-season, the team acquired second-year forward John Wallace from the New York Knicks in a three-team trade. In November, Isiah Thomas resigned as the Raptors' General Manager, and would soon take up a job as a color analyst for the NBA on NBC.

=== Regular season ===
With the addition of McGrady and Wallace, the Raptors got off to a 1–2 start to the regular season, but then struggled posting a 17-game losing streak afterwards, leading to a dreadful 1–19 start to the season. The team improved in January with a 6–8 record, including a four-game winning streak, and later on held an 11–36 record at the All-Star break. At mid-season, the Raptors traded Damon Stoudamire, Walt Williams, and Carlos Rogers to the Portland Trail Blazers in exchange for Kenny Anderson, Gary Trent, and rookie point guard and second-round draft pick Alvin Williams, as head coach Darrell Walker resigned after 49 games. However, Anderson refused to play for the Raptors, and was soon traded along with Popeye Jones, and Žan Tabak to the Boston Celtics in exchange for rookie point guard, and first-round draft pick Chauncey Billups, Dee Brown, rookie power forward John Thomas, and second-year forward Roy Rogers. Before the trades, Stoudamire averaged 19.4 points, 8.1 assists and 1.6 steals per game in 49 games, while Walt Williams provided the team with 12.4 points and 1.4 steals per game in 28 games, and Jones contributed 8.6 points and 7.3 rebounds per game in 14 games.

The team also released Shawn Respert to free agency, as he later on signed as a free agent with the Dallas Mavericks. Under interim coach Butch Carter, the Raptors continued to struggle posting a 5–28 record for the remainder of the season, which included a 13-game losing streak between March and April, and losing 16 of their final 17 games. The Raptors finished in last place in the Central Division with a franchise worst record of 16–66; this was also the first, and only season in which the Raptors finished with a worse record than their Canadian rival, the Vancouver Grizzlies, who finished with a 19–63 record.

Doug Christie averaged 16.5 points, 5.2 rebounds, 3.6 assists and 2.4 steals per game, and led the Raptors with 100 three-point field goals, while Wallace averaged 14.0 points, 4.5 rebounds and 1.2 blocks per game, and second-year star Marcus Camby provided the team with 12.1 points, 7.4 rebounds and led the league with 3.7 blocks per game. In addition, Trent provided with 12.2 points and 8.0 rebounds per game in 13 games after the trade, while Brown contributed 12.2 points, 3.3 assists and 1.2 steals per game in 31 games, and Billups averaged 11.3 points and 3.3 assists per game in 31 games, but only shot .349 in field-goal percentage. Meanwhile, Reggie Slater contributed 8.0 points and 3.9 rebounds per game, while McGrady provided with 7.0 points and 4.2 rebounds per game off the bench, and Oliver Miller averaged 6.3 points and rebounds per game each.

During the NBA All-Star weekend at Madison Square Garden in New York City, New York, McGrady was selected for the NBA Rookie Game, as a member of the Eastern Conference Rookie team; before the mid-season trade, Billups also participated in the Rookie Game as a member of the Eastern Conference, while playing for the Celtics. Wallace finished tied in eighth place in Most Improved Player voting. The Raptors finished 16th in the NBA in home-game attendance, with an attendance of 674,685 at the SkyDome during the regular season.

=== Aftermath ===
This was also the Raptors' final full season in which they played their home games at the SkyDome. Following the season, Camby was traded to the New York Knicks after two seasons with the Raptors, while Billups was traded to the Denver Nuggets, and Trent signed as a free agent with the Dallas Mavericks. Meanwhile, Miller was released to free agency, Rogers was dealt to the Houston Rockets, and Sharone Wright, who only played just seven games this season due to an off-season car accident, retired after four seasons in the NBA.

== Draft picks ==
| Round | Pick | Player | Position | Nationality | College |
|---|---|---|---|---|---|
| 1 | 9 | Tracy McGrady | SG/SF | United States | |

== Roster ==
1997–98 Toronto Raptors roster
Players

| Pos. | No. | Player | Height | Weight | DOB | From |
|---|---|---|---|---|---|---|
| G | 3 | Chauncey Billups | 6 ft 3 in (1.91 m) | 202 lb (92 kg) | 1976–09–25 | Colorado |
| G | 7 | Dee Brown | 6 ft 1 in (1.85 m) | 160 lb (73 kg) | 1968–11–29 | Jacksonville |
| F/C | 21 | Marcus Camby | 6 ft 11 in (2.11 m) | 220 lb (100 kg) | 1974–03–22 | UMass |
| G | 13 | Doug Christie | 6 ft 6 in (1.98 m) | 200 lb (91 kg) | 1970–05–09 | Pepperdine |
| G | 00 | Chris Garner | 5 ft 10 in (1.78 m) | 156 lb (71 kg) | 1975–02–02 | Memphis |
| F | 1 | Tracy McGrady | 6 ft 8 in (2.03 m) | 210 lb (95 kg) | 1979–05–24 | Mt. Zion Christian Academy HS (NC) |
| C | 2 | Oliver Miller | 6 ft 9 in (2.06 m) | 280 lb (127 kg) | 1970–04–06 | Arkansas |
| F | 9 | Roy Rogers (injured) | 6 ft 10 in (2.08 m) | 235 lb (107 kg) | 1973–08–19 | Alabama |
| F | 35 | Reggie Slater | 6 ft 7 in (2.01 m) | 215 lb (98 kg) | 1970–08–27 | Wyoming |
| F | 12 | John Thomas | 6 ft 9 in (2.06 m) | 265 lb (120 kg) | 1975–09–08 | Minnesota |
| F | 33 | Gary Trent | 6 ft 8 in (2.03 m) | 250 lb (113 kg) | 1974–09–22 | Ohio |
| F | 44 | John Wallace | 6 ft 8 in (2.03 m) | 225 lb (102 kg) | 1974–02–09 | Syracuse |
| G | 22 | Alvin Williams | 6 ft 5 in (1.96 m) | 185 lb (84 kg) | 1974–08–06 | Villanova |
| C | 4 | Sharone Wright (injured) | 6 ft 11 in (2.11 m) | 260 lb (118 kg) | 1973–01–30 | Clemson |

Coaches
Head coach
- Butch Carter
Assistant(s)
- Bob Kloppenburg
- John Shumate
- Brendan Suhr
- Jim Thomas
- Bob Zuffelato

Legend
- (DP) Unsigned draft pick
- (FA) Free agent
- (S) Suspended
- Injured

Roster
Updated: March 19, 1998

== Regular season ==
In February 1998, Damon Stoudamire was traded by the Raptors along with Walt Williams and Carlos Rogers to the Portland Trail Blazers, for Kenny Anderson, Alvin Williams, Gary Trent, two first-round draft choices, a second-round draft choice and an amount of money. Anderson refused to report to the team, because he did not want to play in Canada. He was then sent along with Popeye Jones and Žan Tabak to the Boston Celtics for Chauncey Billups, Dee Brown, John Thomas and Roy Rogers.

=== Highs ===
In his second year, Marcus Camby led the league in blocks with 3.7 per game

=== Lows ===
A seventeen-game losing streak at the start of the season. Their season was over before it even started.

=== Season standings ===
| Central Division | W | L | PCT | GB | Home | Road | Div |
|---|---|---|---|---|---|---|---|
| y-Chicago Bulls | 62 | 20 | .756 | – | 37–4 | 25–16 | 21–7 |
| x-Indiana Pacers | 58 | 24 | .707 | 4 | 32–9 | 26–15 | 19–9 |
| x-Charlotte Hornets | 51 | 31 | .622 | 11 | 32–9 | 19–22 | 16–12 |
| x-Atlanta Hawks | 50 | 32 | .610 | 12 | 29–12 | 21–20 | 19–9 |
| x-Cleveland Cavaliers | 47 | 35 | .573 | 15 | 27–14 | 20–21 | 14–14 |
| Detroit Pistons | 37 | 45 | .451 | 25 | 25–16 | 12–29 | 12–16 |
| Milwaukee Bucks | 36 | 46 | .439 | 26 | 21–20 | 15–26 | 9–19 |
| Toronto Raptors | 16 | 66 | .195 | 46 | 9–32 | 7–34 | 2–26 |

| # | Eastern Conference | | | | |
| # | Team | W | L | PCT | GB |
|---|---|---|---|---|---|
| 1 | c-Chicago Bulls | 62 | 20 | .756 | – |
| 2 | y-Miami Heat | 55 | 27 | .671 | 7 |
| 3 | x-Indiana Pacers | 58 | 24 | .707 | 4 |
| 4 | x-Charlotte Hornets | 51 | 31 | .622 | 11 |
| 5 | x-Atlanta Hawks | 50 | 32 | .610 | 12 |
| 6 | x-Cleveland Cavaliers | 47 | 35 | .573 | 15 |
| 7 | x-New York Knicks | 43 | 39 | .524 | 19 |
| 8 | x-New Jersey Nets | 43 | 39 | .524 | 19 |
| 9 | Washington Wizards | 42 | 40 | .512 | 20 |
| 10 | Orlando Magic | 41 | 41 | .500 | 21 |
| 11 | Detroit Pistons | 37 | 45 | .451 | 25 |
| 12 | Boston Celtics | 36 | 46 | .439 | 26 |
| 13 | Milwaukee Bucks | 36 | 46 | .439 | 26 |
| 14 | Philadelphia 76ers | 31 | 51 | .378 | 31 |
| 15 | Toronto Raptors | 16 | 66 | .195 | 46 |

=== Game log ===
1997–98 game log
October: 0–1 (home: 0–0; road: 0–1)

| Game | Date | Team | Score | High points | High rebounds | High assists | Location Attendance | Record |
|---|---|---|---|---|---|---|---|---|
| 1 | October 31 | @ Miami | L 101–114 | Doug Christie, Walt Williams (18) | Marcus Camby (12) | Walt Williams (4) | Miami Arena; 14,795 | 0–1 |

November: 1–14 (home: 1–7; road: 0–7)

| Game | Date | Team | Score | High points | High rebounds | High assists | Location Attendance | Record |
|---|---|---|---|---|---|---|---|---|
| 2 | November 1 | @ Atlanta | L 85–90 | Damon Stoudamire (21) | Popeye Jones (7) | Damon Stoudamire (6) | Alexander Memorial Coliseum; 8,539 | 0–2 |
| 3 | November 4 | Golden State | W 104–86 | John Wallace (17) | Doug Christie (8) | Damon Stoudamire (13) | SkyDome; 16,624 | 1–2 |
| 4 | November 6 | Seattle | L 92–109 | Damon Stoudamire (22) | Marcus Camby (9) | Damon Stoudamire (7) | SkyDome; 15,459 | 1–3 |
| 5 | November 8 | @ Orlando | L 87–96 | Marcus Camby (17) | Doug Christie (7) | Damon Stoudamire (9) | Orlando Arena; 17,248 | 1–4 |
| 6 | November 10 | San Antonio | L 98–100 | Doug Christie (26) | Popeye Jones (12) | Damon Stoudamire (13) | SkyDome; 18,174 | 1–5 |
| 7 | November 12 | New York | L 70–93 | John Wallace (13) | Popeye Jones (7) | Damon Stoudamire (7) | SkyDome; 18,143 | 1–6 |
| 8 | November 14 | @ Boston | L 99–103 | Walt Williams (25) | Walt Williams (12) | Damon Stoudamire (9) | FleetCenter; 17,224 | 1–7 |
| 9 | November 15 | Indiana | L 77–105 | John Wallace (17) | Tracy McGrady (11) | Damon Stoudamire (14) | SkyDome; 17,188 | 1–8 |
| 10 | November 18 | Boston | L 109–122 | John Wallace (30) | John Wallace (12) | Shawn Respert, Damon Stoudamire (6) | SkyDome; 16,343 | 1–9 |
| 11 | November 20 | @ Houston | L 97–127 | Damon Stoudamire (25) | Damon Stoudamire (11) | Damon Stoudamire (4) | Compaq Center; 16,285 | 1–10 |
| 12 | November 22 | @ Miami | L 104–108 | John Wallace (28) | Žan Tabak (9) | Damon Stoudamire (11) | Miami Arena; 14,381 | 1–11 |
| 13 | November 24 | Portland | L 90–91 | Damon Stoudamire (29) | Popeye Jones, Reggie Slater (7) | Damon Stoudamire (11) | SkyDome; 15,051 | 1–12 |
| 14 | November 26 | Atlanta | L 104–109 (2OT) | John Wallace (30) | Popeye Jones (16) | Damon Stoudamire (13) | SkyDome; 15,639 | 1–13 |
| 15 | November 28 | @ Dallas | L 91–93 | Doug Christie (27) | John Wallace (10) | Damon Stoudamire (6) | Reunion Arena; 13,327 | 1–14 |
| 16 | November 30 | @ L.A. Lakers | L 99–105 | John Wallace (25) | Popeye Jones (9) | Damon Stoudamire (11) | Great Western Forum; 14,940 | 1–15 |

December: 3–11 (home: 1–5; road: 2–6)

| Game | Date | Team | Score | High points | High rebounds | High assists | Location Attendance | Record |
|---|---|---|---|---|---|---|---|---|
| 17 | December 3 | @ Utah | L 98–115 | Damon Stoudamire (25) | Oliver Miller (8) | Oliver Miller (4) | Delta Center; 19,590 | 1–16 |
| 18 | December 5 | @ Phoenix | L 91–110 | John Wallace (20) | Oliver Miller (9) | Damon Stoudamire (4) | America West Arena; 19,023 | 1–17 |
| 19 | December 7 | Detroit | L 83–93 | John Wallace (23) | Oliver Miller (9) | Damon Stoudamire (9) | SkyDome; 16,289 | 1–18 |
| 20 | December 9 | Charlotte | L 82–95 | Damon Stoudamire (20) | Oliver Miller (12) | Damon Stoudamire (7) | SkyDome; 16,325 | 1–19 |
| 21 | December 10 | @ Philadelphia | W 104–97 | Walt Williams (39) | Oliver Miller (11) | Damon Stoudamire (14) | CoreStates Center; 11,833 | 2–19 |
| 22 | December 13 | @ Chicago | L 70–97 | John Wallace (14) | John Wallace (7) | Chris Garner, Damon Stoudamire (3) | United Center; 23,867 | 2-20 |
| 23 | December 15 | Indiana | L 101–108 | Marcus Camby (28) | Oliver Miller (8) | Damon Stoudamire (15) | SkyDome; 14,562 | 2-21 |
| 24 | December 17 | Boston | L 83–88 | Tracy McGrady (17) | Oliver Miller (8) | Damon Stoudamire (5) | SkyDome; 14,771 | 2-22 |
| 25 | December 19 | Milwaukee | W 92–91 | Damon Stoudamire (36) | Marcus Camby (14) | Damon Stoudamire (8) | SkyDome; 15,076 | 3-22 |
| 26 | December 20 | Washington | L 92–94 | Marcus Camby, Damon Stoudamire (18) | Damon Stoudamire (7) | Damon Stoudamire (8) | SkyDome; 15,434 | 3-23 |
| 27 | December 22 | @ Charlotte | L 79–81 | Damon Stoudamire (21) | Doug Christie, Damon Stoudamire (7) | Doug Christie (6) | Charlotte Coliseum; 23,449 | 3-24 |
| 28 | December 27 | @ New York | W 97–94 | Damon Stoudamire (30) | Reggie Slater (11) | Damon Stoudamire (5) | Madison Square Garden; 19,763 | 4-24 |
| 29 | December 30 | @ Detroit | L 95–100 | Damon Stoudamire (36) | Oliver Miller (11) | Damon Stoudamire (8) | The Palace of Auburn Hills; 19,087 | 4-25 |
| 30 | December 31 | @ Washington | L 91–118 | Damon Stoudamire (19) | Tracy McGrady, Damon Stoudamire (5) | Damon Stoudamire (7) | MCI Center; 19,651 | 4–26 |

January: 6–8 (home: 4–5; road: 2–3)

| Game | Date | Team | Score | High points | High rebounds | High assists | Location Attendance | Record |
|---|---|---|---|---|---|---|---|---|
| 31 | January 2 | Detroit | L 88–91 | Doug Christie (23) | Doug Christie (8) | Damon Stoudamire (16) | SkyDome; 17,292 | 4-27 |
| 32 | January 3 | @ Indiana | L 77–89 | John Wallace (18) | Oliver Miller (12) | Damon Stoudamire (6) | Market Square Arena; 16,259 | 4-28 |
| 33 | January 5 | Houston | L 96–120 | Oliver Miller (22) | Doug Christie, Žan Tabak (7) | Damon Stoudamire (12) | SkyDome; 16,375 | 4-29 |
| 34 | January 7 | Orlando | L 81–83 | Damon Stoudamire (26) | Doug Christie (12) | Damon Stoudamire (7) | SkyDome; 15,168 | 4-30 |
| 35 | January 10 | @ Cleveland | W 102–93 | Damon Stoudamire (34) | Oliver Miller (11) | Damon Stoudamire (7) | Gund Arena; 17,864 | 5-30 |
| 36 | January 12 | New Jersey | L 100–108 | Damon Stoudamire (19) | Marcus Camby (13) | Damon Stoudamire (6) | SkyDome; 14,376 | 5-31 |
| 37 | January 14 | L.A. Clippers | W 109–101 | Damon Stoudamire (36) | Marcus Camby, Oliver Miller (6) | Damon Stoudamire (11) | SkyDome; 15,073 | 6-31 |
| 38 | January 17 | New York | L 82–93 | Marcus Camby (22) | Carlos Rogers (11) | Damon Stoudamire (10) | SkyDome; 18,898 | 6-32 |
| 39 | January 19 | @ Charlotte | L 88–109 | Žan Tabak (23) | Žan Tabak (7) | Damon Stoudamire (12) | Charlotte Coliseum; 21,934 | 6-33 |
| 40 | January 21 | Sacramento | W 99–98 | Damon Stoudamire (36) | Marcus Camby (18) | Damon Stoudamire (11) | SkyDome; 14,212 | 7-33 |
| 41 | January 24 | Minnesota | W 113–107 (OT) | Doug Christie (31) | Marcus Camby, Oliver Miller (12) | Damon Stoudamire (10) | SkyDome; 15,778 | 8-33 |
| 42 | January 26 | Philadelphia | W 91–87 | Doug Christie (26) | Marcus Camby (10) | Damon Stoudamire (8) | SkyDome; 14,458 | 9-33 |
| 43 | January 29 | @ Denver | W 84–80 | Damon Stoudamire (22) | Oliver Miller (8) | Damon Stoudamire (5) | McNichols Sports Arena; 9,629 | 10–33 |
| 44 | January 30 | @ Sacramento | L 97–123 | John Wallace (18) | Marcus Camby, Carlos Rogers (6) | Doug Christie, John Wallace (3) | ARCO Arena; 14,170 | 10–34 |

February: 3–9 (home: 2–4; road: 1–5)

| Game | Date | Team | Score | High points | High rebounds | High assists | Location Attendance | Record |
|---|---|---|---|---|---|---|---|---|
| 45 | February 1 | @ Portland | L 90–97 | Damon Stoudamire (21) | John Wallace (9) | Damon Stoudamire (9) | Rose Garden; 20,792 | 10–35 |
| 46 | February 3 | Phoenix | L 105–110 | Doug Christie, Walt Williams (24) | Marcus Camby (10) | Damon Stoudamire (8) | SkyDome; 14,344 | 10–36 |
| 47 | February 5 | Dallas | W 101–93 | Damon Stoudamire (21) | Marcus Camby (16) | Damon Stoudamire (8) | SkyDome; 14,292 | 11–36 |
| 48 | February 10 | @ Chicago | L 86–93 | Damon Stoudamire (19) | Marcus Camby (11) | Damon Stoudamire, Walt Williams (4) | United Center; 23,881 | 11–37 |
| 49 | February 12 | Cleveland | L 94–103 | Doug Christie (26) | Oliver Miller (8) | Oliver Miller (10) | SkyDome; 14,348 | 11–38 |
| 50 | February 13 | @ New Jersey | L 115–130 | John Wallace (29) | John Wallace (12) | John Wallace (6) | Continental Airlines Arena; 14,263 | 11–39 |
| 51 | February 15 | Miami | L 95–116 | John Wallace (27) | Tracy McGrady (8) | Chris Garner (7) | SkyDome; 16,888 | 11–40 |
| 52 | February 19 | Chicago | L 86–123 | John Wallace (19) | Oliver Miller (7) | Doug Christie (5) | SkyDome; 30,172 | 11–41 |
| 53 | February 20 | @ Milwaukee | L 89–94 | Doug Christie (23) | Marcus Camby (10) | Oliver Miller (4) | Bradley Center; 17,856 | 11–42 |
| 54 | February 22 | Vancouver | W 113–105 (OT) | Chauncey Billups (27) | Gary Trent (15) | Doug Christie (7) | SkyDome; 16,932 | 12–42 |
| 55 | February 26 | @ San Antonio | L 86–97 | Doug Christie (17) | Gary Trent (10) | Oliver Miller (6) | Alamodome; 13,978 | 12–43 |
| 56 | February 27 | @ Orlando | W 115–107 (3OT) | Doug Christie (35) | Marcus Camby (13) | Dee Brown (9) | Orlando Arena; 16,947 | 13–43 |

March: 2–13 (home: 1–7; road: 1–6)

| Game | Date | Team | Score | High points | High rebounds | High assists | Location Attendance | Record |
|---|---|---|---|---|---|---|---|---|
| 57 | March 3 | Utah | L 93–108 | Chauncey Billups (26) | Gary Trent (7) | Oliver Miller (8) | SkyDome; 16,448 | 13–44 |
| 58 | March 4 | @ Cleveland | L 88–122 | Doug Christie (16) | Marcus Camby, Oliver Miller (5) | Dee Brown, John Wallace (4) | Gund Arena; 15,017 | 13–45 |
| 59 | March 6 | @ Minnesota | L 91–113 | Chauncey Billups (20) | Marcus Camby (9) | Oliver Miller (4) | Target Center; 18,156 | 13–46 |
| 60 | March 8 | @ Vancouver | L 106–113 | Dee Brown (21) | Doug Christie (8) | Oliver Miller (8) | General Motors Place; 16,098 | 13–47 |
| 61 | March 10 | @ Seattle | L 93–111 | John Wallace (25) | John Wallace (9) | Doug Christie, John Wallace (5) | KeyArena; 17,072 | 13–48 |
| 62 | March 13 | @ L.A. Clippers | L 120–152 | Reggie Slater (20) | Oliver Miller (7) | Oliver Miller (4) | Los Angeles Memorial Sports Arena; 6,152 | 13–49 |
| 63 | March 15 | @ Golden State | W 100–98 (OT) | Doug Christie (24) | Marcus Camby (16) | Oliver Miller (4) | The New Arena in Oakland; 13,063 | 14–49 |
| 64 | March 17 | Atlanta | L 105–117 | Doug Christie (30) | Oliver Miller (9) | Doug Christie (8) | SkyDome; 16,546 | 14–50 |
| 65 | March 19 | Denver | W 104–103 (OT) | Dee Brown (24) | Doug Christie (9) | Dee Brown, Doug Christie, Oliver Miller (5) | SkyDome; 14,274 | 15–50 |
| 66 | March 20 | @ Detroit | L 99–105 | Chauncey Billups (22) | Marcus Camby (8) | Doug Christie (7) | The Palace of Auburn Hills; 22,076 | 15–51 |
| 67 | March 22 | Chicago | L 100–102 | John Wallace (26) | Doug Christie, Tracy McGrady (9) | Tracy McGrady (8) | SkyDome; 33,216 | 15–52 |
| 68 | March 24 | Charlotte | L 89–106 | Marcus Camby (20) | John Wallace (10) | Chauncey Billups (6) | SkyDome; 14,490 | 15–53 |
| 69 | March 26 | Cleveland | L 96–97 | Doug Christie (26) | Marcus Camby (13) | Doug Christie (8) | SkyDome; 14,120 | 15–54 |
| 70 | March 29 | Orlando | L 68–95 | Doug Christie (20) | Oliver Miller (11) | Chauncey Billups (4) | SkyDome; 16,876 | 15–55 |
| 71 | March 31 | L.A. Lakers | L 105–114 | Chauncey Billups (21) | Marcus Camby, Gary Trent (7) | Chauncey Billups, Oliver Miller (6) | Maple Leaf Gardens; 16,086 | 15–56 |

April: 1–10 (home: 0–4; road: 1–6)

| Game | Date | Team | Score | High points | High rebounds | High assists | Location Attendance | Record |
|---|---|---|---|---|---|---|---|---|
| 72 | April 1 | @ Atlanta | L 91–105 | Doug Christie, Gary Trent (14) | Marcus Camby, Tracy McGrady (9) | Doug Christie (3) | Georgia Dome; 10,441 | 15–57 |
| 73 | April 3 | @ Washington | L 112–120 | Dee Brown (30) | Gary Trent (10) | Dee Brown (6) | MCI Center; 18,324 | 15–58 |
| 74 | April 5 | @ Philadelphia | L 104–116 | Gary Trent (25) | Tracy McGrady (13) | Dee Brown (6) | CoreStates Center; 15,808 | 15–59 |
| 75 | April 7 | @ Milwaukee | L 105–114 | Doug Christie (20) | Reggie Slater (8) | Doug Christie (5) | Bradley Center; 13,288 | 15–60 |
| 76 | April 8 | Milwaukee | L 100–107 | Gary Trent (24) | Chauncey Billups, Tracy McGrady (9) | Doug Christie (8) | SkyDome; 14,168 | 15–61 |
| 77 | April 10 | Miami | L 105–111 (OT) | Doug Christie (26) | Tracy McGrady (15) | Doug Christie (7) | SkyDome; 16,111 | 15–62 |
| 78 | April 12 | New Jersey | L 109–116 | Dee Brown (30) | Marcus Camby (11) | Tracy McGrady (6) | SkyDome; 14,088 | 15–63 |
| 79 | April 14 | @ New Jersey | W 96–92 | Doug Christie (23) | Marcus Camby (12) | Chauncey Billups, Doug Christie (4) | Continental Airlines Arena; 17,521 | 16–63 |
| 80 | April 16 | @ New York | L 79–108 | Doug Christie (14) | Doug Christie, Tracy McGrady (7) | Dee Brown (4) | Madison Square Garden; 19,763 | 16–64 |
| 81 | April 17 | @ Indiana | L 98–107 | Doug Christie (24) | Gary Trent (12) | Chauncey Billups (5) | Market Square Arena; 16,059 | 16–65 |
| 82 | April 19 | Philadelphia | L 78–107 | Doug Christie (16) | Marcus Camby (11) | Doug Christie (4) | Maple Leaf Gardens; 14,578 | 16–66 |

1997–98 season schedule

== Player statistics ==
=== Ragular season ===
| Player | POS | GP | GS | MP | REB | AST | STL | BLK | PTS | MPG | RPG | APG | SPG | BPG | PPG |
|---|---|---|---|---|---|---|---|---|---|---|---|---|---|---|---|
| John Wallace | SF | 82 | 36 | 2,361 | 373 | 110 | 62 | 101 | 1,147 | 28.8 | 4.5 | 1.3 | .8 | 1.2 | 14.0 |
| Doug Christie | SG | 78 | 78 | 2,939 | 404 | 282 | 190 | 57 | 1,287 | 37.7 | 5.2 | 3.6 | 2.4 | .7 | 16.5 |
| Reggie Slater | PF | 78 | 28 | 1,662 | 305 | 74 | 45 | 30 | 625 | 21.3 | 3.9 | .9 | .6 | .4 | 8.0 |
| Oliver Miller | C | 64 | 53 | 1,628 | 400 | 196 | 58 | 72 | 401 | 25.4 | 6.3 | 3.1 | .9 | 1.1 | 6.3 |
| Tracy McGrady | SF | 64 | 17 | 1,179 | 269 | 98 | 49 | 61 | 451 | 18.4 | 4.2 | 1.5 | .8 | 1.0 | 7.0 |
| Marcus Camby | C | 63 | 58 | 2,002 | 466 | 111 | 68 | 230 | 765 | 31.8 | 7.4 | 1.8 | 1.1 | 3.7 | 12.1 |
| Damon Stoudamire^{†} | PG | 49 | 49 | 2,033 | 217 | 399 | 80 | 5 | 952 | 41.5 | 4.4 | 8.1 | 1.6 | .1 | 19.4 |
| Shawn Respert^{†} | SG | 47 | 4 | 696 | 73 | 44 | 29 | 1 | 257 | 14.8 | 1.6 | .9 | .6 | .0 | 5.5 |
| Žan Tabak^{†} | C | 39 | 29 | 752 | 154 | 36 | 15 | 27 | 248 | 19.3 | 3.9 | .9 | .4 | .7 | 6.4 |
| Chris Garner | PG | 38 | 0 | 293 | 24 | 45 | 21 | 4 | 53 | 7.7 | .6 | 1.2 | .6 | .1 | 1.4 |
| Dee Brown^{†} | SG | 31 | 2 | 908 | 90 | 101 | 38 | 17 | 378 | 29.3 | 2.9 | 3.3 | 1.2 | .5 | 12.2 |
| Chauncey Billups^{†} | PG | 29 | 26 | 920 | 77 | 97 | 30 | 2 | 328 | 31.7 | 2.7 | 3.3 | 1.0 | .1 | 11.3 |
| Walt Williams^{†} | SF | 28 | 16 | 876 | 118 | 69 | 40 | 23 | 348 | 31.3 | 4.2 | 2.5 | 1.4 | .8 | 12.4 |
| John Thomas^{†} | PF | 21 | 0 | 167 | 36 | 4 | 3 | 3 | 43 | 8.0 | 1.7 | .2 | .1 | .1 | 2.0 |
| Carlos Rogers^{†} | PF | 18 | 0 | 351 | 65 | 16 | 9 | 8 | 108 | 19.5 | 3.6 | .9 | .5 | .4 | 6.0 |
| Popeye Jones | PF | 14 | 4 | 352 | 102 | 18 | 10 | 3 | 120 | 25.1 | 7.3 | 1.3 | .7 | .2 | 8.6 |
| Gary Trent^{†} | PF | 13 | 7 | 355 | 104 | 14 | 8 | 8 | 159 | 27.3 | 8.0 | 1.1 | .6 | .6 | 12.2 |
| Alvin Williams^{†} | SG | 13 | 3 | 207 | 21 | 20 | 8 | 1 | 41 | 15.9 | 1.6 | 1.5 | .6 | .1 | 3.2 |
| Sharone Wright | C | 7 | 0 | 44 | 9 | 4 | 0 | 0 | 16 | 6.3 | 1.3 | .6 | .0 | .0 | 2.3 |
| Lloyd Daniels | SG | 6 | 0 | 82 | 7 | 4 | 3 | 2 | 34 | 13.7 | 1.2 | .7 | .5 | .3 | 5.7 |
| Roy Rogers^{†} | PF | 6 | 0 | 69 | 12 | 1 | 1 | 4 | 13 | 11.5 | 2.0 | .2 | .2 | .7 | 2.2 |
| Tim Kempton^{†} | PF | 5 | 0 | 32 | 5 | 2 | 1 | 2 | 4 | 6.4 | 1.0 | .4 | .2 | .4 | .8 |
| Ed Stokes | C | 4 | 0 | 17 | 4 | 1 | 1 | 2 | 3 | 4.3 | 1.0 | .3 | .3 | .5 | .8 |
| Bob McCann | SF | 1 | 0 | 5 | 1 | 0 | 0 | 0 | 0 | 5.0 | 1.0 | .0 | .0 | .0 | .0 |

- ^{†} Denotes player spent time with another team in the season. Stats reflect time with the Raptors only.
