= Canadian Basketball League =

Defunct Canadian basketball league

- Sport: Basketball
- Founded: 2014
- First season: 2016–17
- Folded: 2017
- CEO: Butch Carter
- Motto: Development League
- No. of teams: 4
- Country: Canada
- Continent: FIBA Americas (Americas)
- Last champion: Scarborough Basketball Club
- Broadcaster: yes tv
- Website: canadianbasketball.com

The Canadian Basketball League (CBL) was a professional basketball minor league based around the Greater Toronto Area of Southern Ontario. The CBL was founded in July 2014 by former NBA coach Butch Carter.

== Teams ==
Team	City	Arena
Durham United Basketball Club	Oshawa, Ontario	Durham Campus Recreation & Wellness Centre
Hamilton United Basketball Club	Hamilton, Ontario	David Braley Athletics & Recreation Centre
Scarborough Basketball Club	Toronto, Ontario	Toronto Pan Am Sports Centre
