= Butch Carter =

American basketball player and coach (born 1958)

Personal information
- Born: June 11, 1958 (age 68) Springfield, Ohio, U.S.
- Listed height: 6 ft 5 in (1.96 m)
- Listed weight: 180 lb (82 kg)

Career information
- High school: Middletown (Middletown, Ohio)
- College: Indiana (1976–1980)
- NBA draft: 1980: 2nd round, 37th overall pick
- Drafted by: Los Angeles Lakers
- Playing career: 1980–1986
- Position: Shooting guard
- Number: 24, 12, 7
- Coaching career: 1987–2000

Career history

Playing
- 1980–1981: Los Angeles Lakers
- 1981–1984: Indiana Pacers
- 1984–1985: New York Knicks
- 1985: Philadelphia 76ers
- 1985–1986: Cincinnati Slammers

Coaching
- 1987–1989: Middletown HS
- 1989–1990: Long Beach State (assistant)
- 1990–1991: Dayton (assistant)
- 1991–1996: Milwaukee Bucks (assistant)
- 1997–1998: Toronto Raptors (assistant)
- 1998: Toronto Raptors (interim)
- 1998–2000: Toronto Raptors

Career highlights
- Third-team Parade All-American (1976)

Career NBA statistics
- Points: 3,137 (8.7 ppg)
- Rebounds: 546 (1.5 rpg)
- Assists: 683 (1.9 apg)
- Stats at NBA.com
- Stats at Basketball Reference

Clarence Eugene "Butch" Carter Jr. (born June 11, 1958) is an American former professional basketball player and coach. He played college basketball for the Indiana Hoosiers.

== Early years ==
Carter excelled in basketball and football at Middletown High School in Middletown, Ohio from 1973 to 1976, and was named Ohio's "Player of the Year" in 1976. Carter became the first McDonalds All-American basketball player to play in the classic in Washington, D.C. in 1976.

== College career ==
Carter accepted a basketball scholarship from Indiana University Bloomington and earned a degree in marketing and business from Kelley School of Business in 1980. He broke his 5th metatarsal bone in his left foot and was physically unable to play for most of his first two years.

He played guard for the Hoosiers from 1976 to 1980 and graduated with a degree in marketing from the Kelley School of Business. There, he was notable for hitting the game-winning shot in the 1979 NIT championship game vs. Purdue as a junior, earning him the tournament's MVP award, alongside teammate Ray Tolbert. He also hit the free throws that tied the Championship game against Ohio State with two seconds remaining.

Carter was named co-captain as a senior and led the team to the 1980 Big Ten Championship. He was the first guard to lead the Big Ten field goal percentage at .547 and shot .511 for his college career.

== Professional career ==
Carter was selected by the Los Angeles Lakers in the second round (37th overall) of the 1980 NBA draft. On October 15, 1981, he was traded to the Indiana Pacers in exchange for a third round draft choice (#54-Willie Jones).

In 1984, the Pacers opted to go with a youth movement, keeping rookies Vern Fleming and Devin Durrant as their shooting guards. On October 19, Carter was traded to the New York Knicks in exchange for a second round draft choice (#27-Dwayne McClain).

On November 12, 1985, he was released to make room for the recently re-signed Louis Orr. On December 5, he was signed as a free agent by the Philadelphia 76ers, to provide depth for an injured Sedale Threatt. He was released on December 16.

Carter played a total of six years in the NBA with the Los Angeles Lakers (1980–1981), Indiana Pacers (1981–1984), New York Knicks (1984–1985), and Philadelphia 76ers (1985). He averaged 8.7 points per game over the six seasons. He held the NBA record for most points in an overtime period (14) for twenty years until surpassed by Earl Boykins.

== Coaching career ==
From 1987 to 1989, after leaving the NBA, Carter returned to his alma mater, Middletown High School. There, he improved the team from a previous losing record to an 18–3 record. He was acknowledged for this two-year turnaround by being named Ohio Basketball High School Coach of the Year. Carter is the only person to be named both Player and Coach of the Year in the state of Ohio.

Carter served as an assistant basketball coach at Long Beach State for Joe Harrington 1989. From 1990 to 1991, he was an assistant coach at the University of Dayton.

=== Milwaukee Bucks ===
Carter served as an assistant coach with the Milwaukee Bucks from 1991 to 1996 under Frank Hamblen (1991) and Mike Dunleavy (1992–1996). He was promoted to the position of the Bucks scout in 1996–1997.

=== Toronto Raptors ===
During the 1997–1998 season, Carter served as an assistant coach for the Toronto Raptors under Darrell Walker. He was promoted to head coach midway through the 1997–1998 season after Walker resigned from the team with a franchise low 11–38 record. Carter finished the remainder of the season as interim Coach with a 5–28 record.

During the shortened 1998–99 NBA season, Carter coached the Raptors to a 23–27 record, improving the team's winning percentage by .308 from the all-time franchise low 16–66 season. Carter developed a reputation for developing young players, such as Rookie of the Year and NBA All-Star Vince Carter, and eventual NBA All-Star Tracy McGrady.

In the 1999–2000 season, Carter coached the Raptors to their first winning season (with a 45–37 record), resulting in the team's first playoff appearance. He became the first coach in NBA history to take a team from less than 20 wins to the playoffs in less than two years. However, the playoff berth was short-lived as the Raptors were eliminated in the first round by the Knicks. On June 14, 2000, Carter was fired. Richard Peddie, then president and CEO of the owner of the Raptors, accused Carter of trying to take general manager Glen Grunwald's job, which Carter denied, saying he only asked for the assistant general manager position.

== Autobiography ==
In 2000, Carter published his autobiography (co-written with his brother Cris Carter). In the book, he detailed playing under Indiana University coach, Bobby Knight, including how one night, Knight stormed into the locker room after a practice and chewed out another player, saying he would end up like "all the rest of the n------ in Chicago, including your brothers." Knight denied the claim and former teammates Isiah Thomas and Mike Woodson denied ever hearing Knight use the slur. Knight and Carter also had issues after the coach learned how Carter had used athletic department phones for more than $1,000 in long-distance calls.

== Post-coaching career ==
After his coaching career ended, Carter went into business, owning a car parts manufacturer and car dealership. He was the CEO and founder of the Canadian Basketball League, which was formed in 2014 as a pro basketball league in the Greater Toronto Area that began play in 2016. It ceased operations after one year.

== Career playing statistics ==
Legend
GP	Games played	GS	Games started	MPG	Minutes per game
FG%	Field goal percentage	3P%	3-point field goal percentage	FT%	Free throw percentage
RPG	Rebounds per game	APG	Assists per game	SPG	Steals per game
BPG	Blocks per game	PPG	Points per game	**Bold**	Career high

=== NBA ===
==== Regular season ====
Year	Team	GP	GS	MPG	FG%	3P%	FT%	RPG	APG	SPG	BPG	PPG
1980–81	L.A. Lakers	54		12.4	.462	.300	.737	1.2	1.0	.4	.0	5.6
1981–82	Indiana	75	0	13.8	.468	.320	.829	1.1	.8	.5	.1	5.9
1982–83	Indiana	**81**	28	21.2	**.501**	**.333**	.805	1.9	2.4	1.0	**.2**	10.5
1983–84	Indiana	73	**54**	**28.0**	.479	.326	.764	**2.1**	**2.8**	**1.8**	**.2**	**13.4**
1984–85	New York	69	11	18.5	.450	.256	.813	1.4	2.4	.8	.1	7.9
1985–86	New York	5	0	6.2	.250	.000	**1.000**	.6	.6	.2	.0	1.0
1985–86	Philadelphia	4	0	9.0	.313	–	.833	.3	.3	.0	.0	3.8
Career		361	93	18.9	.475	.307	.788	1.5	1.9	.9	.1	8.7

== Head coaching record ==
Legend
Regular season	G	Games coached	W	Games won	L	Games lost	W–L %	Win–loss %
Playoffs	PG	Playoff games	PW	Playoff wins	PL	Playoff losses	PW–L %	Playoff win–loss %

Team	Year	G	W	L	W–L%	Finish	PG	PW	PL	PW–L%	Result
Toronto	1997–98	33	5	28	.152	8th in Central	–	–	–	–	Missed playoffs
Toronto	1998–99	50	23	27	.460	6th in Central	–	–	–	–	Missed playoffs
Toronto	1999–2000	82	45	37	.549	3rd in Central	3	0	3	.000	Lost in First Round
Career		165	73	92	.442		3	0	3	.000	

== Personal life ==
He is the older brother of Pro Football Hall of Fame wide receiver Cris Carter.
