= 1997–98 Vancouver Grizzlies season =

- Head coach: Brian Hill
- General manager: Stu Jackson
- Owners: John McCaw, Jr.
- Arena: General Motors Place

Results
- Record: 19–63 (.232)
- Place: Division: 6th (Midwest); Conference: 11th (Western)
- Playoff finish: Did not qualify
- Stats at Basketball Reference

Local media
- Television: CHEK-TV; Showcase
- Radio: CKNW

The 1997–98 Vancouver Grizzlies season was the third season for the Vancouver Grizzlies in the National Basketball Association.

== Season summary ==
=== Off-season ===
After finishing with the league's worst record in their first two seasons, the Grizzlies received the fourth overall pick in the 1997 NBA draft, and selected point guard Antonio Daniels out of Bowling Green State University. During the off-season, the team acquired former All-Star forward Otis Thorpe from the Detroit Pistons, acquired three-point specialist Sam Mack from the Houston Rockets, and acquired Tony Massenburg from the Boston Celtics. The Grizzlies also hired Brian Hill as their new head coach; Hill previously coached the Orlando Magic, and led them to the 1995 NBA Finals, where they lost to the 6th–seeded Houston Rockets in a four-game sweep.

For the season, the Grizzlies revealed new black alternate road uniforms, which featured a V-shaped collar, the city name "Vancouver" on the front of their jerseys, a turquoise, white and red trim, and turquoise side panels with a red outline on their jerseys and the left leg of their shorts; the leg left also featured the team's alternate logo of a grizzly bear scratching a turquoise letter "G". The team's new alternate uniforms would eventually become their primary road jerseys for the 2000–01 season, where they would also redesign their home uniforms by adding a V-shaped collar and turquoise side panels.

Both uniforms would remain in use until 2004, although "Vancouver" would be replaced with the city name "Memphis" in 2001, after the franchise's relocation to Memphis, Tennessee.

=== Regular season ===
Under Hill and with the addition of Thorpe, Mack and Daniels, the Grizzlies played slightly below .500 in winning percentage with a 6–7 start to the regular season. However, the team continued to struggle posting a 13-game losing streak between December and January, and later on held a 13–36 record at the All-Star break. At mid-season, the team traded Thorpe along with second-year guard Chris Robinson back to his former team, the Sacramento Kings, in exchange for Michael Smith and Bobby Hurley, and traded Anthony Peeler to the Minnesota Timberwolves in exchange for Doug West. Before the trade, Thorpe averaged 11.2 points and 7.9 rebounds per game in 47 games, while Peeler averaged 9.9 points per game in only just eight games;

Thorpe and Peeler were both disgruntled in Vancouver, while Peeler spent most of the first half of the season on the Grizzlies' bench, as Hill mainly used Mack and sixth man Blue Edwards at shooting guard. Meanwhile, West, who sustained a hip contusion injury before the trade, struggled with substance abuse and depression, and went into rehab for alcohol treatment, as he was out for the remainder of the season; West refused to play for the Grizzlies after suffering from losing in his first seven seasons with the Timberwolves since their inaugural season. In late February, the Grizzlies continued to make changes to their starting lineup, as Hill replaced Daniels with Lee Mayberry as the team's starting point guard; Daniels played third-string behind Hurley, the team's backup point guard behind Mayberry, for the remainder of the season.

The Grizzlies posted a seven-game losing streak between January and February, posted an eight-game losing streak between February and March, another seven-game losing streak in March, and then posted a six-game losing streak between March and April. The Grizzlies finally escaped last place by finishing in sixth place in the Midwest Division with a 19–63 record, as the Denver Nuggets finished in last place with a league-worst 11–71 record; this was also the first, and only season in which the Grizzlies finished with a better record than their Canadian rival, the Toronto Raptors, who finished with a 16–66 record.

Second-year star Shareef Abdur-Rahim averaged 22.3 points and 7.1 rebounds per game, while Bryant Reeves averaged 16.3 points and 7.9 rebounds per game, and Mack provided the team with 10.8 points per game, and also led them with 110 three-point field goals. In addition, Edwards contributed 10.8 points per game, while Daniels provided with 7.8 points and 4.5 assists per game, George Lynch contributed 7.5 points and 4.4 rebounds per game, and Massenburg averaged 6.5 points and 3.8 rebounds per game. Meanwhile, Smith averaged 6.1 points and 6.9 rebounds per game in 30 games after the trade, Pete Chilcutt provided with 4.9 points and 3.7 rebounds per game, Mayberry contributed 4.6 points and 4.4 assists per game, and Hurley contributed 4.5 points and 3.6 assists per game in 27 games.

During the NBA All-Star weekend at Madison Square Garden in New York City, New York, Mack participated in the NBA Three-Point Shootout, while Daniels was selected for the NBA Rookie Game, as a member of the Western Conference Rookie team. The Grizzlies finished 19th in the NBA in home-game attendance, with an attendance of 660,457 at General Motors Place during the regular season.

=== Aftermath ===
Following the season, Daniels was traded to the San Antonio Spurs on draft day after only one season with the Grizzlies, while Edwards signed as a free agent with the Miami Heat during the next season, Lynch signed with the Philadelphia 76ers, and Hurley was released to free agency.

== Draft picks ==
The Grizzlies first draft pick was Antonio Daniels, which was the fourth overall pick in the draft.

Round	Pick	Player	Position	Nationality	College
1	4	Antonio Daniels	PG/SG	United States	Bowling Green State University
2	52	C.J. Bruton	G	United States	Indian Hills Community College

== Roster ==
1997–98 Vancouver Grizzlies roster
Players

Pos.	No.	Player	Height	Weight	DOB	From
F	3	Shareef Abdur-Rahim	6 ft 9 in (2.06 m)	225 lb (102 kg)	––	California
F/C	23	Pete Chilcutt	6 ft 10 in (2.08 m)	230 lb (104 kg)	––	North Carolina
G	33	Antonio Daniels	6 ft 4 in (1.93 m)	205 lb (93 kg)	––	Bowling Green
G	30	Blue Edwards	6 ft 4 in (1.93 m)	200 lb (91 kg)	––	East Carolina
G	12	Bobby Hurley	6 ft 0 in (1.83 m)	165 lb (75 kg)	––	Duke
F	9	George Lynch	6 ft 8 in (2.03 m)	218 lb (99 kg)	––	North Carolina
G	7	Sam Mack (injured)	6 ft 7 in (2.01 m)	220 lb (100 kg)	––	Houston
F/C	44	Tony Massenburg	6 ft 9 in (2.06 m)	220 lb (100 kg)	––	Maryland
G	11	Lee Mayberry	6 ft 1 in (1.85 m)	172 lb (78 kg)	––	Arkansas
F	40	Ivano Newbill	6 ft 9 in (2.06 m)	245 lb (111 kg)	––	Georgia Tech
C	50	Bryant Reeves (injured)	7 ft 0 in (2.13 m)	290 lb (132 kg)	––	Oklahoma State
G	6	Larry Robinson	6 ft 3 in (1.91 m)	190 lb (86 kg)	––	Centenary
F	34	Michael Smith	6 ft 8 in (2.03 m)	230 lb (104 kg)	––	Providence
G	2	Doug West (injured) (IN)	6 ft 6 in (1.98 m)	200 lb (91 kg)	––	Villanova

Coaches
Head coach
- Brian Hill
Assistant(s)
- Jim Boylan
- Lionel Hollins
- Jack Nolan

Legend
- (DP) Unsigned draft pick
- (FA) Free agent
- (S) Suspended
- (IN) Inactive
- Injured

Roster

=== Roster Notes ===
- Shooting guard Doug West was acquired by the Grizzlies from the Minnesota Timberwolves in a mid-season trade, but was placed on the injured reserve list; West struggled with substance abuse and depression, and went into rehab for alcohol treatment, also sustained a hip contusion injury with the Timberwolves, and did not play for the Grizzlies this season.

== Regular season ==
The Grizzlies got off to their best start in team history, as thirteen games into the season, the team had a 6–7 record. On October 31, 1997, Violet Palmer made history in Vancouver when she officiated the NBA season opener between the Vancouver Grizzlies and the Dallas Mavericks, in British Columbia, Canada. The team would then fall into a slump, which included a thirteen-game losing streak as they fell out of playoff contention. Vancouver would finish the year with a 19–63 record, their best in team history, and finish out of last place for the first time ever.

=== Highs ===
- Vancouver recorded their first ever three game winning streak, as on January 20, they defeated the Denver Nuggets, followed by sweeping a home and home series against the Golden State Warriors.
- On March 23, 1998, Vancouver defeated the Los Angeles Clippers 106–95 to earn their sixteenth win of the season, a team record. Vancouver finished with nineteen wins, four higher than their previous high of fifteen, set in 1995–96.
- The Grizzlies finished out of the Midwest Division cellar for the first time in team history, as they had a 19–63 record, eight games better than the Denver Nuggets, who finished the year 11–71.

=== Lows ===
- On January 15, 1998, the Washington Wizards defeat Vancouver 112–110, sending the Grizzlies to their thirteenth consecutive loss.
- From January 27 to April 5, the Grizzlies win only 3 of 31 games.

=== Season standings ===
Midwest Division	W	L	PCT	GB	Home	Road	Div
z-Utah Jazz	62	20	.756	–	36–5	26–15	22–2
x-San Antonio Spurs	56	26	.683	6	31–10	25–16	18–6
x-Minnesota Timberwolves	45	37	.549	17	26–15	19–22	14–10
x-Houston Rockets	41	41	.500	21	24–17	17–24	14–10
Dallas Mavericks	20	62	.244	42	13–28	7–34	9–15
Vancouver Grizzlies	19	63	.232	43	14–27	5–36	4–20
Denver Nuggets	11	71	.134	51	9–32	2–39	3–21

#	Western Conference				
#	Team	W	L	PCT	GB
1	z-Utah Jazz	62	20	.756	–
2	y-Seattle SuperSonics	61	21	.744	1
3	x-Los Angeles Lakers	61	21	.744	1
4	x-Phoenix Suns	56	26	.683	6
5	x-San Antonio Spurs	56	26	.683	6
6	x-Portland Trail Blazers	46	36	.561	16
7	x-Minnesota Timberwolves	45	37	.549	17
8	x-Houston Rockets	41	41	.500	21
9	Sacramento Kings	27	55	.329	35
10	Dallas Mavericks	20	62	.244	42
11	Vancouver Grizzlies	19	63	.232	43
12	Golden State Warriors	19	63	.232	43
13	Los Angeles Clippers	17	65	.207	45
14	Denver Nuggets	11	71	.134	51

=== Game log ===
#	Date	Opponent	Score	Record	Attendance
1	October 31	Dallas Mavericks	88–90	0–1	17,021
2	November 1	Sacramento Kings	97–96	1–1	15,460
3	November 4	@ Dallas Mavericks	87–92	1–2	14,285
4	November 5	@ San Antonio Spurs	79–87	1–3	14,523
5	November 7	Minnesota Timberwolves	97–108	1–4	15,302
6	November 9	Detroit Pistons	104–96 (OT)	2–4	14,925
7	November 11	Los Angeles Clippers	119–113	3–4	15,160
8	November 12	@ Utah Jazz	80–98	3–5	19,851
9	November 15	Milwaukee Bucks	109–94	4–5	17,666
10	November 16	@ Los Angeles Lakers	95–121	4–6	17,139
11	November 18	@ Denver Nuggets	100–87	5–6	9,718
12	November 19	@ Seattle SuperSonics	87–107	5–7	17,072
13	November 21	Denver Nuggets	99–96	6–7	15,988
14	November 23	@ New York Knicks	84–104	6–8	19,763
15	November 26	@ Milwaukee Bucks	82–101	6–9	15,126
16	November 27	@ Indiana Pacers	85–106	6–10	14,391
17	November 29	@ Minnesota Timberwolves	87–106	6–11	17,494
18	November 30	@ Detroit Pistons	97–95	7–11	16,030
19	December 3	Orlando Magic	97–101	7–12	15,069
20	December 5	Cleveland Cavaliers	98–107	7–13	15,558
21	December 9	@ Phoenix Suns	85–107	7–14	19,023
22	December 12	Golden State Warriors	95–88	8–14	14,810
23	December 14	Houston Rockets	110–105	9–14	14,411
24	December 16	@ Houston Rockets	91–118	9–15	16,285
25	December 17	@ San Antonio Spurs	87–98	9–16	13,576
26	December 19	@ Portland Trail Blazers	91–96	9–17	19,863
27	December 21	Portland Trail Blazers	88–86	10–17	15,174
28	December 26	Phoenix Suns	100–118	10–18	17,023
29	December 28	Utah Jazz	88–89	10–19	16,488
30	December 30	San Antonio Spurs	115–124	10–20	15,872
31	January 1	Philadelphia 76ers	104–115	10–21	15,495
32	January 2	@ Sacramento Kings	80–94	10–22	13,925
33	January 4	Seattle SuperSonics	108–120	10–23	15,122
34	January 6	Los Angeles Lakers	87–100	10–24	15,837
35	January 7	@ Los Angeles Clippers	102–110	10–25	4,107
36	January 9	Charlotte Hornets	90–98	10–26	15,251
37	January 11	Miami Heat	90–96	10–27	15,186
38	January 13	@ Philadelphia 76ers	89–107	10–28	10,838
39	January 15	@ Boston Celtics	93–97	10–29	16,855
40	January 16	@ Washington Wizards	110–112	10–30	16,763
41	January 20	Denver Nuggets	88–77	11–30	15,852
42	January 23	@ Golden State Warriors	88–80	12–30	12,359
43	January 24	Golden State Warriors	107–96	13–30	16,223
44	January 27	Chicago Bulls	85–103	13–31	19,193
45	January 29	Minnesota Timberwolves	106–112	13–32	15,111
46	January 31	New Jersey Nets	106–116	13–33	17,094
47	February 2	@ Dallas Mavericks	90–104	13–34	11,049
48	February 3	@ Houston Rockets	97–110	13–35	16,285
49	February 5	@ Charlotte Hornets	93–108	13–36	21,984
50	February 12	Houston Rockets	103–112	13–37	15,620
51	February 14	Washington Wizards	110–108	14–37	16,105
52	February 18	Boston Celtics	105–114	14–38	16,703
53	February 20	@ Atlanta Hawks	92–115	14–39	9,022
54	February 22	@ Toronto Raptors	105–113 (OT)	14–40	16,932
55	February 24	@ New Jersey Nets	101–110	14–41	13,335
56	February 25	@ Cleveland Cavaliers	101–106	14–42	13,701
57	March 1	Atlanta Hawks	76–101	14–43	15,371
58	March 3	Indiana Pacers	103–111	14–44	15,095
59	March 6	Sacramento Kings	96–98	14–45	14,605
60	March 8	Toronto Raptors	113–106	15–45	16,098
61	March 12	@ Denver Nuggets	93–98	15–46	9,112
62	March 13	@ Utah Jazz	101–110	15–47	19,911
63	March 15	Los Angeles Lakers	110–119	15–48	18,983
64	March 17	@ Orlando Magic	92–99	15–49	17,248
65	March 18	@ Miami Heat	91–94	15–50	14,653
66	March 20	@ Chicago Bulls	92–98	15–51	24,023
67	March 21	@ Minnesota Timberwolves	88–102	15–52	18,336
68	March 23	Los Angeles Clippers	106–95	16–52	15,392
69	March 26	@ Portland Trail Blazers	102–108	16–53	20,581
70	March 27	New York Knicks	89–97 (OT)	16–54	17,630
71	March 29	@ Phoenix Suns	98–106	16–55	19,023
72	March 31	Dallas Mavericks	101–104	16–56	15,120
73	April 3	Seattle SuperSonics	98–138	16–57	19,193
74	April 5	Utah Jazz	93–99	16–58	18,068
75	April 7	@ Los Angeles Clippers	110–94	17–58	5,124
76	April 8	@ Los Angeles Lakers	102–113	17–59	17,505
77	April 11	Portland Trail Blazers	105–96 (OT)	18–59	16,432
78	April 12	Phoenix Suns	106–129	18–60	16,266
79	April 14	@ Seattle SuperSonics	98–110	18–61	17,072
80	April 16	San Antonio Spurs	97–110	18–62	17,485
81	April 18	@ Golden State Warriors	100–112	18–63	16,481
82	April 19	@ Sacramento Kings	112–108 (OT)	19–63	15,329

== Player statistics ==
=== Ragular season ===
Player	POS	GP	GS	MP	REB	AST	STL	BLK	PTS	MPG	RPG	APG	SPG	BPG	PPG
Shareef Abdur-Rahim	SF	82	82	2,950	581	213	89	76	1,829	36.0	7.1	2.6	1.1	.9	22.3
George Lynch	SF	82	0	1,493	362	122	65	41	616	18.2	4.4	1.5	.8	.5	7.5
Pete Chilcutt	PF	82	0	1,420	306	104	53	37	405	17.3	3.7	1.3	.6	.5	4.9
Blue Edwards	SG	81	20	1,968	217	201	86	27	872	24.3	2.7	2.5	1.1	.3	10.8
Lee Mayberry	PG	79	32	1,835	114	349	65	10	363	23.2	1.4	4.4	.8	.1	4.6
Bryant Reeves	C	74	74	2,527	585	155	39	80	1,207	34.1	7.9	2.1	.5	1.1	16.3
Antonio Daniels	SG	74	50	1,956	143	334	55	10	579	26.4	1.9	4.5	.7	.1	7.8
Tony Massenburg	C	61	13	894	232	21	25	24	396	14.7	3.8	.3	.4	.4	6.5
Sam Mack	SF	57	54	1,414	133	101	41	11	616	24.8	2.3	1.8	.7	.2	10.8
Otis Thorpe^{†}	PF	47	46	1,574	371	161	30	23	528	33.5	7.9	3.4	.6	.5	11.2
Michael Smith^{†}	PF	30	29	706	206	59	26	6	182	23.5	6.9	2.0	.9	.2	6.1
Ivano Newbill	PF	28	2	249	69	9	10	3	58	8.9	2.5	.3	.4	.1	2.1
Bobby Hurley^{†}	PG	27	0	458	30	97	10	0	122	17.0	1.1	3.6	.4	.0	4.5
Chris Robinson^{†}	SG	16	0	143	13	10	7	1	54	8.9	.8	.6	.4	.1	3.4
Anthony Peeler^{†}	SG	8	8	202	20	23	9	0	79	25.3	2.5	2.9	1.1	.0	9.9
Larry Robinson	SF	6	0	41	12	1	4	0	17	6.8	2.0	.2	.7	.0	2.8

- ^{†} Denotes player spent time with another team in the season. Stats reflect time with the Grizzlies only.

== Transactions ==
Vancouver acquired forward-center Otis Thorpe in a trade with the Detroit Pistons. The Grizzlies gave up a conditional first round draft pick. Vancouver also acquired Sam Mack from the Houston Rockets to become the team's starting shooting guard. Midway through the season, Thorpe was traded along with Chris Robinson to the Sacramento Kings for Michael Smith and Bobby Hurley.

The Grizzlies hired Brian Hill to become the head coach. Hill had previously been the head coach of the Orlando Magic from 1993 to 1997, leading them to a 191–104 record under his helm. The Magic advanced to the 1995 NBA Finals and had a 60 win season in 1995–96.
