= 1997–98 Sacramento Kings season =

NBA professional basketball team season

- Head coach: Eddie Jordan
- President: Geoff Petrie
- General manager: Geoff Petrie
- Owner: Jim Thomas
- Arena: ARCO Arena

Results
- Record: 27–55 (.329)
- Place: Division: 5th (Pacific); Conference: 9th (Western)
- Playoff finish: Did not qualify
- Stats at Basketball Reference

Local media
- Television: KPWB-TV; SportsChannel Pacific/Fox Sports Bay Area
- Radio: KHTK

The 1997–98 Sacramento Kings season was the 49th season for the Sacramento Kings in the National Basketball Association, and their 13th season in Sacramento, California.

== Season summary ==
=== Off-season ===
The Kings received the eleventh overall pick in the 1997 NBA draft, and selected shooting guard, and French basketball star Olivier Saint Jean out of San Jose State University; the team also selected point guard Anthony Johnson out of the College of Charleston with the 39th overall pick. Saint Jean would later on change his name to Tariq Abdul-Wahad after converting to Islam the previous year. During the off-season, the Kings signed free agent Terry Dehere, and undrafted rookie center Michael Stewart from the University of California. Rookie power forward Lawrence Funderburke out of Ohio State University, who was drafted by the Kings as the 51st overall pick in the 1994 NBA draft, but went to play overseas in Greece and France, made his debut in the NBA this season.

=== Regular season ===
With the addition of Funderburke, Johnson, Abdul-Wahad, Dehere and Stewart, the Kings got off to a 5–9 start to the regular season, and then posted a six-game losing streak between November and December afterwards. The team won 8 of their 14 games in January, and later on held a 20–28 record at the All-Star break. At mid-season, the Kings traded Michael Smith, and Bobby Hurley to the Vancouver Grizzlies in exchange for former Kings forward Otis Thorpe, and second-year guard Chris Robinson.

However, with a 24–29 record as of February 17, 1998, the Kings struggled losing 26 of their final 29 games of the season. The team posted a seven-game losing streak between February and March, suffered a 12-game losing streak between March and April, and then posted another seven-game losing streak to close the season; Mitch Richmond missed twelve games late in the season due to a sore right knee injury. The Kings finished in fifth place in the Pacific Division with a 27–55 record, which was fourteen games behind the 8th–seeded Houston Rockets; the team also set a record of fifteen consecutive losing seasons under .500 in winning percentage.

Richmond averaged 23.2 points, 4.0 assists and 1.3 steals per game, led the Kings with 130 three-point field goals, and was named to the All-NBA Third Team. In addition, Corliss Williamson showed improvement becoming the team's starting small forward, averaging 17.7 points and 5.6 rebounds per game, while Billy Owens provided the team with 10.5 points and 7.5 rebounds per game, and Funderburke played a sixth man role off the bench, averaging 9.5 points and 4.5 rebounds per game, but only played 52 games due to a strained right rotator cuff injury. Meanwhile, Thorpe averaged 8.3 points and 6.1 rebounds per game in 27 games after the trade, Johnson contributed 7.5 points and 4.3 assists per game, and Olden Polynice provided with 7.9 points and 6.3 rebounds per game. Mahmoud Abdul-Rauf contributed 7.3 points per game, but only played just 31 games, missing the final three months of the regular season due to the flu, and an corneal ulcer, while Dehere provided with 6.4 points and 2.5 assists per game, Abdul-Wahad contributed 6.4 points per game, and Stewart averaged 4.6 points, 6.6 rebounds and 2.4 blocks per game.

During the NBA All-Star weekend at Madison Square Garden in New York City, New York, Richmond was selected for the 1998 NBA All-Star Game, as a member of the Western Conference All-Star team; it was his sixth and final All-Star appearance. In addition, Richmond also participated in the inaugural NBA 2Ball Competition, along with Ruthie Bolton-Holifield of the WNBA's Sacramento Monarchs, and Stewart was selected for the NBA Rookie Game, as a member of the Western Conference Rookie team. Richmond finished in 15th place in Most Valuable Player voting, while Williamson finished in second place in Most Improved Player voting, behind Alan Henderson of the Atlanta Hawks.

The Kings finished 25th in the NBA in home-game attendance, with an attendance of 605,443 at the ARCO Arena II during the regular season, which was the fifth-lowest in the league. For the first time since moving to Sacramento, the team failed to sell out a home game at the ARCO Arena II on November 6, 1997, ending their 497-game sellout streak.

=== Aftermath ===
Following the season, Richmond and Thorpe were both traded to the Washington Wizards, after Richmond spent seven seasons with the Kings. Meanwhile, Owens and Polynice both signed as free agents with the Seattle SuperSonics, whom Polynice used to play for, Johnson signed with the Atlanta Hawks, Stewart signed with the Toronto Raptors, Abdul-Rauf left to play overseas in Turkey, and head coach Eddie Jordan was fired.

== Draft picks ==
Round	Pick	Player	Position	Nationality	College
1	11	Tariq Abdul-Wahad	SG/SF	France	San Jose State
2	39	Anthony Johnson	PG	United States	College of Charleston

== Roster ==
1997–98 Sacramento Kings roster
Players

Pos.	No.	Player	Height	Weight	DOB	From
G	3	Mahmoud Abdul-Rauf	6 ft 1 in (1.85 m)	162 lb (73 kg)	1969–03–09	LSU
G/F	9	Tariq Abdul-Wahad	6 ft 6 in (1.98 m)	205 lb (93 kg)	1974–11–03	San José State
G	24	Terry Dehere	6 ft 2 in (1.88 m)	190 lb (86 kg)	1971–09–12	Seton Hall
F	51	Lawrence Funderburke	6 ft 9 in (2.06 m)	230 lb (104 kg)	1970–12–15	Ohio State
F	42	Mark Hendrickson	6 ft 9 in (2.06 m)	220 lb (100 kg)	1974–06–23	Washington State
G	10	Anthony Johnson	6 ft 3 in (1.91 m)	190 lb (86 kg)	1974–10–02	College of Charleston
F	30	Billy Owens	6 ft 8 in (2.03 m)	220 lb (100 kg)	1969–05–01	Syracuse
C	0	Olden Polynice	6 ft 11 in (2.11 m)	220 lb (100 kg)	1964–11–21	Virginia
G	2	Mitch Richmond	6 ft 5 in (1.96 m)	215 lb (98 kg)	1965–06–30	Kansas State
G	5	Chris Robinson	6 ft 5 in (1.96 m)	200 lb (91 kg)	1974–04–02	Western Kentucky
C	13	Michael Stewart	6 ft 10 in (2.08 m)	230 lb (104 kg)	1975–04–25	California
C	33	Otis Thorpe	6 ft 9 in (2.06 m)	225 lb (102 kg)	1962–08–05	Providence
F	4	Corliss Williamson	6 ft 7 in (2.01 m)	245 lb (111 kg)	1973–12–04	Arkansas

Coaches
Head coach
- Eddie Jordan
Assistant(s)
- Mike Bratz
- Pete Carril
- Ralph Lewis

Legend
- (DP) Unsigned draft pick
- (FA) Free agent
- (S) Suspended
- Injured

Roster
Updated: February 20, 1998

=== Roster Notes ===
- Small forward Kevin Gamble was waived on February 20, 1998.
- Center Kevin Salvadori was waived on February 20, 1998.

== Regular season ==
=== Season standings ===
Pacific Division	W	L	PCT	GB	Home	Road	Div
y-Seattle SuperSonics	61	21	.744	–	35–6	26–15	19–5
x-Los Angeles Lakers	61	21	.744	–	33–8	28–13	16–8
x-Phoenix Suns	56	26	.683	5	30–11	26–15	17–7
x-Portland Trail Blazers	46	36	.561	15	26–15	20–21	14–10
Sacramento Kings	27	55	.329	34	21–20	6–35	6–18
Golden State Warriors	19	63	.232	42	12–29	7–34	6–18
Los Angeles Clippers	17	65	.207	44	11–30	6–35	6–18

#	Western Conference				
#	Team	W	L	PCT	GB
1	z-Utah Jazz	62	20	.756	–
2	y-Seattle SuperSonics	61	21	.744	1
3	x-Los Angeles Lakers	61	21	.744	1
4	x-Phoenix Suns	56	26	.683	6
5	x-San Antonio Spurs	56	26	.683	6
6	x-Portland Trail Blazers	46	36	.561	16
7	x-Minnesota Timberwolves	45	37	.549	17
8	x-Houston Rockets	41	41	.500	21
9	Sacramento Kings	27	55	.329	35
10	Dallas Mavericks	20	62	.244	42
11	Vancouver Grizzlies	19	63	.232	43
12	Golden State Warriors	19	63	.232	43
13	Los Angeles Clippers	17	65	.207	45
14	Denver Nuggets	11	71	.134	51

z - clinched division title
y - clinched division title
x - clinched playoff spot

== Player statistics ==
Legend
GP	Games played	GS	Games started	MPG	Minutes per game
FG%	Field-goal percentage	3P%	3-point field-goal percentage	FT%	Free-throw percentage
RPG	Rebounds per game	APG	Assists per game	SPG	Steals per game
BPG	Blocks per game	PPG	Points per game

=== Regular season ===
Player	GP	GS	MPG	FG%	3P%	FT%	RPG	APG	SPG	BPG	PPG
Michael Stewart	81	37	21.7	.480		.458	6.6	.8	.4	2.4	4.6
Corliss Williamson	79	75	35.7	.495	.000	.630	5.6	2.9	1.0	.6	17.7
Billy Owens	78	78	30.1	.464	.371	.589	7.5	2.8	1.2	.5	10.5
Anthony Johnson	77	62	29.4	.371	.328	.727	2.2	4.3	.8	.1	7.5
Terry Dehere	77	18	18.3	.399	.379	.798	1.4	2.5	.7	.1	6.4
Mitch Richmond	70	70	36.7	.445	.389	.864	3.3	4.0	1.3	.2	23.2
Olden Polynice	70	25	20.8	.459	.000	.452	6.3	1.5	.5	.6	7.9
Tariq Abdul-Wahad	59	16	16.3	.403	.211	.672	2.0	.9	.6	.2	6.4
Lawrence Funderburke	52	1	21.0	.490	.143	.679	4.5	1.2	.4	.3	9.5
Mark Hendrickson	48	1	15.4	.389	.000	.825	3.0	.9	.5	.2	3.4
Bobby Hurley^{†}	34	3	12.3	.409	.267	.811	1.1	2.4	.4	.0	3.8
Mahmoud Abdul-Rauf	31	0	17.1	.377	.161	1.000	1.2	1.9	.5	.0	7.3
Otis Thorpe^{†}	27	20	23.1	.459	.000	.657	6.1	2.3	.7	.3	8.3
Chris Robinson^{†}	19	0	14.3	.378	.405	.500	1.7	1.5	.6	.2	5.7
Michael Smith^{†}	18	4	19.3	.426		.567	5.6	1.6	.8	.5	3.8
Kevin Salvadori	16	0	5.4	.077		.500	1.3	.2	.0	.7	.3
Derek Grimm	9	0	3.8	.286	.333	1.000	.4	.0	.3	.1	1.6

- ^{†} Denotes player spent time with another team in the season. Stats reflect time with the Kings only.

Player statistics citation:

== Awards and records ==
- Mitch Richmond, All-NBA Third Team

== See also ==
- 1997-98 NBA season
