= 1997–98 Dallas Mavericks season =

NBA professional basketball team season

- Head coach: Jim Cleamons (fired); Don Nelson
- General manager: Don Nelson
- Arena: Reunion Arena

Results
- Record: 20–62 (.244)
- Place: Division: 5th (Midwest); Conference: 10th (Western)
- Playoff finish: Did not qualify
- Stats at Basketball Reference

Local media
- Television: KXTX-TV; Fox Sports Southwest
- Radio: WBAP

The 1997–98 Dallas Mavericks season was the 18th season for the Dallas Mavericks in the National Basketball Association.

== Season summary ==
=== Off-season ===
The Mavericks had the 15th overall pick in the 1997 NBA draft, and selected center Kelvin Cato out of Iowa State University, but soon traded him to the Portland Trail Blazers in exchange for Australian rookie center, and first-round draft pick Chris Anstey; the Mavericks originally had the sixth overall pick in the draft, but traded it to the Boston Celtics. During the off-season, the team acquired three-point specialist Dennis Scott from the Orlando Magic, and signed free agent Hubert Davis.

=== Regular season ===
With the addition of Scott and Davis, the Mavericks won their first three games of the regular season, but continued to struggle posting a 10-game losing streak afterwards. Head coach Jim Cleamons was fired after a 4–12 start to the season, and was replaced with General Manager Don Nelson. Along the way, forward A.C. Green broke the NBA's "Iron Man" record of most consecutive games played, breaking Randy Smith's record, which was 906 consecutive games. The Mavericks won their first game under Nelson, in a home victory over the New York Knicks by a score of 105–91 at the Reunion Arena on December 4, 1997. However, the team suffered a 15-game losing streak between December and January afterwards, which led to a dreadful 5–27 start to the season. Players like Shawn Bradley, Robert Pack, Kurt Thomas and second-year forward Samaki Walker all missed large parts of the season due to injuries, as the team held a 9–38 record at the All-Star break.

At mid-season, the team traded Scott to the Phoenix Suns in exchange for Cedric Ceballos; before the trade, Scott averaged 13.6 points per game in 52 games, while Ceballos only played just twelve games with the Mavericks after the trade, due to a season-ending knee injury. The team also signed free agent Shawn Respert, who was previously released by the Toronto Raptors. The Mavericks played around .500 in winning percentage by posting an 8–8 record in March, but then lost eight of their final nine games of the season, finishing in fifth place in the Midwest Division with a 20–62 record, and missing the NBA playoffs for the eighth consecutive year.

Michael Finley averaged 21.5 points, 5.3 rebounds, 4.9 assists and 1.6 steals per game, while Ceballos averaged 16.9 points and 6.0 rebounds per game after the trade, and Bradley provided the team with 11.4 points, 8.1 rebounds and 3.3 blocks per game in 64 games. In addition, Davis contributed 11.1 points per game and led the Mavericks with 101 three-point field goals, while Walker provided with 8.9 points and 7.4 rebounds per game in only just 41 games, Khalid Reeves contributed 8.7 points per game, and Pack averaged 7.8 points, 3.5 assists and 1.7 steals per game in only just twelve games. Meanwhile, Respert contributed 8.2 points per game in ten games, second-year guard Erick Strickland provided with 7.6 points and 2.5 assists per game, but only shot .357 in field-goal percentage, Green averaged 7.3 points and 8.1 rebounds per game, Anstey averaged 5.9 points and 3.8 rebounds per game in 41 games, and second-year forward Martin Müürsepp contributed 5.7 points per game also in 41 games.

During the NBA All-Star weekend at Madison Square Garden in New York City, New York, Davis participated in the NBA Three-Point Shootout for the second time; Davis lost in the final round to Jeff Hornacek of the Utah Jazz. Finley finished tied in fourth place in Most Improved Player voting, and also finished tied in 18th place in Most Valuable Player voting. The Mavericks finished 26th in the NBA in home-game attendance, with an attendance of 503,936 at the Reunion Arena during the regular season, which was the fourth-lowest in the league.

=== Notable highlights ===
One notable highlight of the regular season occurred on December 6, 1997, in which the Mavericks traveled to Mexico City, Mexico to play against the Houston Rockets at the Palacio de los Deportes (Sports Palace). Despite the Mavericks being the home team, the fans cheered for the Rockets. The Mavericks lost to the Rockets by a score of 108–106, in front of a sellout crowd of 20,635 fans in attendance; Finley led the team with 35 points, 7 rebounds and 6 assists. It was the first ever NBA regular season game played in Mexico.

Another notable highlight of the season occurred on December 29, 1997, in a road game against the 2-time defending NBA champion Chicago Bulls at the United Center; Wells fouled out of the game in just three minutes, which was an NBA record for fouling out in the shortest amount of time. Nelson used a strategy for Wells to foul Bulls forward, and rebound-specialist Dennis Rodman, who is known as a poor free throw shooter. However, the plan backfired as Rodman shot 9–12 from the foul line, and the Bulls defeated the Mavericks by a score of 111–105. The Bulls would go on to defeat the Utah Jazz in six games in the 1998 NBA Finals for their third consecutive NBA championship, and sixth overall in eight years.

=== Aftermath ===
Following the season, Thomas signed as a free agent with the New York Knicks, while Müürsepp and rookie small forward, and second-round draft pick Bubba Wells were both traded to the Phoenix Suns on draft day, and Respert was released to free agency.

== Offseason ==
=== Draft picks ===
Round	Pick	Player	Position	Nationality	College
1	15	Kelvin Cato	C	United States	Iowa State
2	34	Bubba Wells	SF/SG	United States	Austin Peay State

== Roster ==
1997–98 Dallas Mavericks roster
Players

Pos.	No.	Player	Height	Weight	DOB	From
C	11	Chris Anstey	7 ft 0 in (2.13 m)	249 lb (113 kg)	1975–01–01	Australia
C	44	Shawn Bradley	7 ft 6 in (2.29 m)	235 lb (107 kg)	1972–03–22	BYU
G/F	23	Cedric Ceballos (injured)	6 ft 6 in (1.98 m)	190 lb (86 kg)	1969–08–02	Cal State Fullerton
G	24	Hubert Davis	6 ft 5 in (1.96 m)	183 lb (83 kg)	1970–05–17	North Carolina
G/F	4	Michael Finley	6 ft 7 in (2.01 m)	215 lb (98 kg)	1973–03–06	Wisconsin
F	45	A.C. Green	6 ft 9 in (2.06 m)	220 lb (100 kg)	1963–10–04	Oregon State
F	13	Martin Müürsepp	6 ft 9 in (2.06 m)	235 lb (107 kg)	1974–09–26	Estonia
G	14	Robert Pack (injured)	6 ft 2 in (1.88 m)	180 lb (82 kg)	1969–02–03	USC
G	6	Khalid Reeves	6 ft 3 in (1.91 m)	199 lb (90 kg)	1972–07–15	Arizona
G	21	Shawn Respert	6 ft 3 in (1.91 m)	195 lb (88 kg)	1972–02–06	Michigan State
C	50	Eric Riley	7 ft 0 in (2.13 m)	245 lb (111 kg)	1970–06–02	Michigan
G	20	Erick Strickland	6 ft 3 in (1.91 m)	210 lb (95 kg)	1973–11–25	Nebraska
F	40	Kurt Thomas (injured)	6 ft 9 in (2.06 m)	230 lb (104 kg)	1972–10–04	TCU
F/C	52	Samaki Walker (injured)	6 ft 9 in (2.06 m)	240 lb (109 kg)	1976–02–25	Louisville
G/F	35	Bubba Wells	6 ft 5 in (1.96 m)	230 lb (104 kg)	1974–07–26	Austin Peay

Coaches
Head coach
- Don Nelson
Assistant(s)
- Sonny Allen
- Butch Beard
- Ron Ekker
- Donnie Nelson
- Charlie Parker
- Scott Roth
- Bob Salmi
- Kurt Thomas

Legend
- (DP) Unsigned draft pick
- (FA) Free agent
- (S) Suspended
- (IN) Inactive
- Injured

Roster
Updated: March 27, 1998

=== Roster notes ===
- Center Shawn Bradley holds both American and German citizenship.
- Rookie power forward Ace Custis was on the injured reserve list due to a preseason knee injury, and missed the entire regular season.

== Regular season ==
=== Season standings ===
Midwest Division	W	L	PCT	GB	Home	Road	Div
z-Utah Jazz	62	20	.756	–	36–5	26–15	22–2
x-San Antonio Spurs	56	26	.683	6	31–10	25–16	18–6
x-Minnesota Timberwolves	45	37	.549	17	26–15	19–22	14–10
x-Houston Rockets	41	41	.500	21	24–17	17–24	14–10
Dallas Mavericks	20	62	.244	42	13–28	7–34	9–15
Vancouver Grizzlies	19	63	.232	43	14–27	5–36	4–20
Denver Nuggets	11	71	.134	51	9–32	2–39	3–21

#	Western Conference				
#	Team	W	L	PCT	GB
1	z-Utah Jazz	62	20	.756	–
2	y-Seattle SuperSonics	61	21	.744	1
3	x-Los Angeles Lakers	61	21	.744	1
4	x-Phoenix Suns	56	26	.683	6
5	x-San Antonio Spurs	56	26	.683	6
6	x-Portland Trail Blazers	46	36	.561	16
7	x-Minnesota Timberwolves	45	37	.549	17
8	x-Houston Rockets	41	41	.500	21
9	Sacramento Kings	27	55	.329	35
10	Dallas Mavericks	20	62	.244	42
11	Vancouver Grizzlies	19	63	.232	43
12	Golden State Warriors	19	63	.232	43
13	Los Angeles Clippers	17	65	.207	45
14	Denver Nuggets	11	71	.134	51

z - clinched division title
y - clinched division title
x - clinched playoff spot

=== Game log ===
1997–98 game log
Total: 20–62 (Home: 13–28; Road: 7–34)
October: 0–0 (home: 0–0; road: 0–0)

Game	Date	Team	Score	High points	High rebounds	High assists	Location Attendance	Record

November: 0–0 (home: 0–0; road: 0–0)

Game	Date	Team	Score	High points	High rebounds	High assists	Location Attendance	Record

December: 0–0 (home: 0–0; road: 0–0)

Game	Date	Team	Score	High points	High rebounds	High assists	Location Attendance	Record

January: 0–0 (home: 0–0; road: 0–0)

Game	Date	Team	Score	High points	High rebounds	High assists	Location Attendance	Record

February: 0–0 (home: 0–0; road: 0–0)

Game	Date	Team	Score	High points	High rebounds	High assists	Location Attendance	Record

March: 0–0 (home: 0–0; road: 0–0)

Game	Date	Team	Score	High points	High rebounds	High assists	Location Attendance	Record

April: 0–0 (home: 0–0; road: 0–0)

Game	Date	Team	Score	High points	High rebounds	High assists	Location Attendance	Record

1997–98 schedule

== Player statistics ==
=== Ragular season ===
Player	POS	GP	GS	MP	REB	AST	STL	BLK	PTS	MPG	RPG	APG	SPG	BPG	PPG
Michael Finley	SF	82	82	3,394	438	405	132	30	1,763	41.4	5.3	4.9	1.6	.4	21.5
A.C. Green	PF	82	68	2,649	668	123	78	27	600	32.3	8.1	1.5	1.0	.3	7.3
Khalid Reeves	PG	82	54	1,950	185	230	80	10	717	23.8	2.3	2.8	1.0	.1	8.7
Hubert Davis	SG	81	30	2,378	169	157	43	5	898	29.4	2.1	1.9	.5	.1	11.1
Erick Strickland	SG	67	19	1,505	161	167	56	8	511	22.5	2.4	2.5	.8	.1	7.6
Shawn Bradley	C	64	46	1,822	518	60	51	214	731	28.5	8.1	.9	.8	3.3	11.4
Dennis Scott^{†}	SF	52	42	1,797	197	129	43	32	707	34.6	3.8	2.5	.8	.6	13.6
Samaki Walker	PF	41	19	1,027	302	24	30	40	365	25.0	7.4	.6	.7	1.0	8.9
Chris Anstey	C	41	8	680	157	35	31	27	240	16.6	3.8	.9	.8	.7	5.9
Martin Müürsepp	PF	41	7	603	114	30	29	14	233	14.7	2.8	.7	.7	.3	5.7
Eric Riley	C	39	14	544	133	22	15	46	139	13.9	3.4	.6	.4	1.2	3.6
Bubba Wells	SG	39	2	395	68	34	15	4	128	10.1	1.7	.9	.4	.1	3.3
Kevin Ollie^{†}	PG	16	0	214	21	32	6	0	46	13.4	1.3	2.0	.4	.0	2.9
Robert Pack	PG	12	10	292	34	42	20	1	94	24.3	2.8	3.5	1.7	.1	7.8
Cedric Ceballos^{†}	SF	12	9	364	72	25	11	8	203	30.3	6.0	2.1	.9	.7	16.9
Shawn Respert^{†}	SG	10	0	215	27	17	5	0	82	21.5	2.7	1.7	.5	.0	8.2
Kurt Thomas	PF	5	0	73	24	3	1	0	37	14.6	4.8	.6	.2	.0	7.4
Adrian Caldwell	PF	1	0	3	0	0	0	0	0	3.0	.0	.0	.0	.0	.0

- ^{†} Denotes player spent time with another team in the season. Stats reflect time with the Mavericks only.

== See also ==
- 1997-98 NBA season
