= 1997–98 Minnesota Timberwolves season =

NBA professional basketball team season

- Head coach: Flip Saunders
- General manager: Kevin McHale
- Owner: Glen Taylor
- Arena: Target Center

Results
- Record: 45–37 (.549)
- Place: Division: 3rd (Midwest); Conference: 7th (Western)
- Playoff finish: First round (lost to SuperSonics 2–3)
- Stats at Basketball Reference

Local media
- Television: KARE; KLGT-TV; Midwest Sports Channel
- Radio: KFAN

The 1997–98 Minnesota Timberwolves season was the ninth season for the Minnesota Timberwolves in the National Basketball Association.

== Season summary ==
=== Off-season ===
During the off-season, the Timberwolves acquired Stanley Roberts from the Los Angeles Clippers on draft day, and later on signed free agent Tom Hammonds in November. In October, All-Star forward Kevin Garnett signed a six-year contract extension with the Timberwolves, which was worth $126 million.

=== Regular season ===
With the addition of Roberts and Hammonds, the Timberwolves won six of their first nine games of the regular season, but then lost nine of their next eleven games, falling below .500 in winning percentage. The team soon recovered posting a seven-game winning streak in January, and later on held a 26–20 record at the All-Star break. However, Tom Gugliotta suffered an ankle injury after 41 games, and was out for the remainder of the season, while Chris Carr, who became the team's starting shooting guard this season, also suffered a season-ending ankle injury after 51 games. At mid-season, the team traded long-time Timberwolves guard Doug West to the Vancouver Grizzlies in exchange for Anthony Peeler. The Timberwolves won seven of their final eight games of the season, and finished in third place in the Midwest Division with a 45–37 record, earning the seventh seed in the Western Conference; it was their first winning record above .500, as the team qualified for their second NBA playoff appearance.

Gugliotta averaged 20.1 points, 8.7 rebounds, 4.1 assists and 1.5 steals per game, while Garnett averaged 18.5 points, 9.6 rebounds, 4.2 assists, 1.7 steals and 1.8 blocks per game, and second-year star Stephon Marbury provided the team with 17.7 points, 8.6 assists and 1.3 steals per game. In addition, Peeler contributed 13.0 points, 3.8 assists and 1.7 steals per game in 30 games after the trade, while Sam Mitchell provided with 12.3 points and 4.8 rebounds per game, Carr contributed 9.9 points per game, and Terry Porter contributed 9.5 points and 3.3 assists per game. On the defensive side, Cherokee Parks averaged 7.1 points and 5.5 rebounds per game, while Roberts contributed 6.2 points and 4.9 rebounds per game, and Hammonds provided with 6.1 points and 4.8 rebounds per game.

During the NBA All-Star weekend at Madison Square Garden in New York City, New York, Garnett was selected for the 1998 NBA All-Star Game, as a member of the Western Conference All-Star team. Despite a stellar season, Marbury was not selected for the NBA All-Star Game. Garnett also finished tied in eleventh place in Defensive Player of the Year voting. The Timberwolves finished eleventh in the NBA in home-game attendance, with an attendance of 738,590 at the Target Center during the regular season.

=== NBA playoffs ===
In the Western Conference First Round of the 1998 NBA playoffs, the Timberwolves faced off against the 2nd–seeded, and Pacific Division champion Seattle SuperSonics, who were led by the All-Star trio of Gary Payton, Vin Baker and Detlef Schrempf. The Timberwolves lost Game 1 to the SuperSonics on the road, 108–83 at the KeyArena at Seattle Center, but managed to win Game 2 on the road, 98–93 to even the series; it was the first time in franchise history that the Timberwolves won an NBA playoff game. The Timberwolves won Game 3 over the SuperSonics at home, 98–90 at the Target Center to take a 2–1 series lead. However, the Timberwolves lost the next two games, which included a Game 5 loss to the SuperSonics at the KeyArena at Seattle Center, 97–84, thus losing in a hard-fought five-game series.

=== Aftermath ===
Following the season, Gugliotta signed as a free agent with the Phoenix Suns, while Porter signed with the Miami Heat, Roberts signed with the Houston Rockets, and Parks signed with the Vancouver Grizzlies. Meanwhile, the oft-injured Michael Williams, who returned to play for the Timberwolves for the first time in two years due to a left heel injury, was released to free agency.

== Draft picks ==
Round	Pick	Player	Position	Nationality	College
1	20	Paul Grant	C	United States	Wisconsin
2	43	Gordon Malone	PF	United States	West Virginia

== Roster ==
1997–98 Minnesota Timberwolves roster
Players

Pos.	No.	Player	Height	Weight	DOB	From
G	43	Chris Carr	6 ft 5 in (1.96 m)	207 lb (94 kg)	1974–03–12	Southern Illinois
F	17	Bill Curley	6 ft 9 in (2.06 m)	220 lb (100 kg)	1972–05–29	Boston College
F/C	21	Kevin Garnett	6 ft 11 in (2.11 m)	220 lb (100 kg)	1976–05–19	Farragut Academy (IL)
F	24	Tom Gugliotta	6 ft 10 in (2.08 m)	240 lb (109 kg)	1969–12–19	NC State
F	20	Tom Hammonds	6 ft 9 in (2.06 m)	215 lb (98 kg)	1967–03–27	Georgia Tech
G	31	Reggie Jordan	6 ft 4 in (1.93 m)	195 lb (88 kg)	1968–01–26	New Mexico State
G	3	Stephon Marbury	6 ft 2 in (1.88 m)	180 lb (82 kg)	1977–02–20	Georgia Tech
F	42	Sam Mitchell	6 ft 6 in (1.98 m)	210 lb (95 kg)	1963–09–02	Mercer
C	44	Cherokee Parks	6 ft 11 in (2.11 m)	235 lb (107 kg)	1972–10–11	Duke
G	1	Anthony Peeler	6 ft 4 in (1.93 m)	208 lb (94 kg)	1969–11–25	Missouri
G	30	Terry Porter	6 ft 3 in (1.91 m)	195 lb (88 kg)	1963–04–08	UW–Stevens Point
C	53	Stanley Roberts	7 ft 0 in (2.13 m)	285 lb (129 kg)	1970–02–07	LSU
G	6	DeJuan Wheat	6 ft 0 in (1.83 m)	165 lb (75 kg)	1973–10–14	Louisville
G	4	Micheal Williams	6 ft 2 in (1.88 m)	175 lb (79 kg)	1966–07–23	Baylor

Coaches
Head coach
- Flip Saunders
Assistant(s)
- Greg Ballard
- Jerry Sichting
- Randy Wittman

Legend
- (DP) Unsigned draft pick
- (FA) Free agent
- (S) Suspended
- (IN) Inactive
- Injured

Roster
Updated: February 18, 1998

=== Roster Notes ===
- Rookie center Paul Grant was on the injured reserve list due to foot and ankle injuries, and missed the entire regular season.

== Regular season ==
=== Season standings ===
Midwest Division	W	L	PCT	GB	Home	Road	Div
z-Utah Jazz	62	20	.756	–	36–5	26–15	22–2
x-San Antonio Spurs	56	26	.683	6	31–10	25–16	18–6
x-Minnesota Timberwolves	45	37	.549	17	26–15	19–22	14–10
x-Houston Rockets	41	41	.500	21	24–17	17–24	14–10
Dallas Mavericks	20	62	.244	42	13–28	7–34	9–15
Vancouver Grizzlies	19	63	.232	43	14–27	5–36	4–20
Denver Nuggets	11	71	.134	51	9–32	2–39	3–21

#	Western Conference				
#	Team	W	L	PCT	GB
1	z-Utah Jazz	62	20	.756	–
2	y-Seattle SuperSonics	61	21	.744	1
3	x-Los Angeles Lakers	61	21	.744	1
4	x-Phoenix Suns	56	26	.683	6
5	x-San Antonio Spurs	56	26	.683	6
6	x-Portland Trail Blazers	46	36	.561	16
7	x-Minnesota Timberwolves	45	37	.549	17
8	x-Houston Rockets	41	41	.500	21
9	Sacramento Kings	27	55	.329	35
10	Dallas Mavericks	20	62	.244	42
11	Vancouver Grizzlies	19	63	.232	43
12	Golden State Warriors	19	63	.232	43
13	Los Angeles Clippers	17	65	.207	45
14	Denver Nuggets	11	71	.134	51

z - clinched division title
y - clinched division title
x - clinched playoff spot

== Playoffs ==
1998 playoff game log
First round: 2–3 (home: 1–1; road: 1–2)

Game	Date	Team	Score	High points	High rebounds	High assists	Location Attendance	Series
1	April 24	@ Seattle	L 83–108	Kevin Garnett (18)	Kevin Garnett (18)	Stephon Marbury (5)	KeyArena; 17,072	0–1
2	April 26	@ Seattle	W 98–93	Stephon Marbury (25)	Anthony Peeler (14)	Stephon Marbury (7)	KeyArena; 17,072	1–1
3	April 28	Seattle	W 98–90	Anthony Peeler (20)	Kevin Garnett (8)	Stephon Marbury (11)	Target Center; 19,006	2–1
4	April 30	Seattle	L 88–92	Kevin Garnett (20)	Kevin Garnett (10)	Stephon Marbury (7)	Target Center; 19,006	2–2
5	May 2	@ Seattle	L 84–97	Anthony Peeler (28)	Reggie Jordan (8)	Stephon Marbury (8)	KeyArena; 17,072	2–3

1998 schedule

== Player statistics ==
=== Ragular season ===
Player	POS	GP	GS	MP	REB	AST	STL	BLK	PTS	MPG	RPG	APG	SPG	BPG	PPG
Kevin Garnett	PF	82	82	3,222	786	348	139	150	1,518	39.3	9.6	4.2	1.7	1.8	18.5
Stephon Marbury	PG	82	81	3,112	230	704	104	7	1,450	38.0	2.8	8.6	1.3	.1	17.7
Terry Porter	PG	82	8	1,786	168	271	63	16	777	21.8	2.0	3.3	.8	.2	9.5
Sam Mitchell	SF	81	33	2,239	385	107	64	22	1,000	27.6	4.8	1.3	.8	.3	12.3
Cherokee Parks	C	79	43	1,703	437	53	36	86	558	21.6	5.5	.7	.5	1.1	7.1
Stanley Roberts	C	74	44	1,328	363	27	24	72	457	17.9	4.9	.4	.3	1.0	6.2
Tom Hammonds	PF	57	2	1,140	271	36	15	17	346	20.0	4.8	.6	.3	.3	6.1
Reggie Jordan	SG	57	1	487	97	50	35	9	149	8.5	1.7	.9	.6	.2	2.6
Chris Carr	SG	51	40	1,165	155	85	17	11	504	22.8	3.0	1.7	.3	.2	9.9
Tom Gugliotta	SF	41	41	1,582	356	167	61	22	823	38.6	8.7	4.1	1.5	.5	20.1
Doug West	SG	38	10	688	82	45	11	5	157	18.1	2.2	1.2	.3	.1	4.1
DeJuan Wheat	PG	34	0	150	11	25	6	1	57	4.4	.3	.7	.2	.0	1.7
Anthony Peeler^{†}	SG	30	24	991	103	114	52	6	390	33.0	3.4	3.8	1.7	.2	13.0
Micheal Williams	PG	25	0	161	14	32	9	2	64	6.4	.6	1.3	.4	.1	2.6
Bill Curley	PF	11	1	146	28	4	3	1	34	13.3	2.5	.4	.3	.1	3.1
Clifford Rozier	C	6	0	30	6	0	0	0	6	5.0	1.0	.0	.0	.0	1.0

- ^{†} Denotes player spent time with another team in the season. Stats reflect time with the Timberwolves only.

=== Playoffs ===
Player	POS	GP	GS	MP	REB	AST	STL	BLK	PTS	MPG	RPG	APG	SPG	BPG	PPG
Anthony Peeler	SG	5	5	213	38	18	10	3	81	42.6	7.6	3.6	2.0	.6	16.2
Stephon Marbury	PG	5	5	209	16	38	12	0	69	41.8	3.2	7.6	2.4	.0	13.8
Kevin Garnett	PF	5	5	194	48	20	4	12	79	38.8	9.6	4.0	.8	2.4	15.8
Sam Mitchell	SF	5	5	177	27	8	1	1	72	35.4	5.4	1.6	.2	.2	14.4
Terry Porter	PG	5	4	188	25	16	5	0	79	37.6	5.0	3.2	1.0	.0	15.8
Tom Hammonds	PF	5	1	113	22	2	0	1	36	22.6	4.4	.4	.0	.2	7.2
Micheal Williams	PG	4	0	58	9	11	3	1	20	14.5	2.3	2.8	.8	.3	5.0
Reggie Jordan	SG	2	0	29	9	3	1	0	12	14.5	4.5	1.5	.5	.0	6.0
Bill Curley	PF	2	0	7	0	0	0	0	0	3.5	.0	.0	.0	.0	.0
Stanley Roberts	C	1	0	8	2	0	0	0	1	8.0	2.0	.0	.0	.0	1.0
DeJuan Wheat	PG	1	0	3	1	0	1	0	2	3.0	1.0	.0	1.0	.0	2.0
Cherokee Parks	C	1	0	1	0	0	0	0	0	1.0	.0	.0	.0	.0	.0

== See also ==
- 1997-98 NBA season
