= Joe Stephens (basketball) =

American basketball player

Personal information
- Born: January 28, 1973 (age 52) Riverside, California, U.S.
- Listed height: 6 ft 7 in (2.01 m)
- Listed weight: 210 lb (95 kg)

Career information
- High school: North Shore (Houston, Texas)
- College: Colorado (1991–1993); Little Rock (1994–1996)
- NBA draft: 1996: undrafted
- Playing career: 1996–2003
- Position: Power forward / small forward
- Number: 41, 23

Career history
- 1996–1997: La Crosse Bobcats
- 1997–1998: Houston Rockets
- 1997: Panteras de Miranda
- 1998: Independiente
- 1998–1999: Idaho Stampede
- 1999: Vancouver Grizzlies
- 2000: Idaho Stampede
- 2000: Purefoods
- 2000: ASVEL Basket
- 2001–2002: Toshiba Brave Thunders
- 2002–2003: Sagesse
- Stats at NBA.com
- Stats at Basketball Reference

Joe Stephens (born January 28, 1973) is an American former professional basketball player. He played college basketball for the Colorado Buffaloes and Little Rock Trojans.

Stephens went undrafted in the 1996 NBA draft. He signed with the Houston Rockets on October 1, 1996, but was later waived on October 30. He subsequently joined the La Crosse Bobcats of Continental Basketball Association (CBA) for the 1996–97 season. On February 12, 1997, he signed a 10-day contract with the Rockets. After playing two games, the contract was terminated on February 19. He later played for Panteras de Miranda in Venezuela during the year.

On July 25, 1997, Stephens re-signed with the Houston Rockets. He played seven games during the 1997–98 season.

Stephens started the 1998–99 season with Independiente in Argentina. In November 1998, he joined the Idaho Stampede of the CBA.

On January 21, 1999, Stephens signed with the Utah Jazz. He was waived by the Jazz on February 2 before he played in a game for them.

On October 4, 1999, Stephens signed with the Vancouver Grizzlies. He was waived on November 30 after appearing in 13 games to start the 1999–2000 season. In February 2000, he re-joined the Idaho Stampede.

In August 2000, Stephens played one game for Purefoods in the Philippines. In October 2000, he signed with French team ASVEL Basket. He was released in December 2000.

In the 2001–02 season, Stephens played for Toshiba Brave Thunders in Japan.

In the 2002–03 season, Stephens played for Sagesse in Lebanon.
