= 1997–98 Houston Rockets season =

- Head coach: Rudy Tomjanovich
- General manager: Carroll Dawson
- Owner: Leslie Alexander
- Arena: The Summit

Results
- Record: 41–41 (.500)
- Place: Division: 4th (Midwest); Conference: 8th (Western)
- Playoff finish: First round (lost to Jazz 2–3)
- Stats at Basketball Reference

Local media
- Television: KHTV; Fox Sports Southwest
- Radio: KTRH

The 1997–98 Houston Rockets season was the 31st season for the Houston Rockets in the National Basketball Association, and their 27th season in Houston, Texas.

== Season summary ==
=== Off-season ===
The Rockets had the 24th overall pick in the 1997 NBA draft, and selected shooting guard Rodrick Rhodes from the University of Southern California.

=== Regular season ===
The Rockets got off to a slow 3–5 start to the regular season, but then posted a nine-game winning streak afterwards, winning 12 of their first 17 games of the season. However, Hakeem Olajuwon suffered a left knee injury in November and only played just 47 games. Without Olajuwon for most of the first half of the season, and with aging players on the team, the Rockets struggled and fell below .500 in winning percentage, holding a 22–24 record at the All-Star break. In February, head coach Rudy Tomjanovich changed the team's starting lineup, replacing Charles Barkley at power forward with Kevin Willis, as Barkley played a sixth man role off the bench for the remainder of the season; Willis had previously started at center in Olajuwon's absence. Olajuwon eventually returned as the Rockets finished in fourth place in the Midwest Division with a mediocre 41–41 record, and earned the eighth seed in the Western Conference; the team qualified for the NBA playoffs for the sixth consecutive year.

Clyde Drexler averaged 18.4 points, 5.5 assists and 1.8 steals per game, and contributed 106 three-point field goals, while Willis averaged 16.1 points and 8.4 rebounds per game, and Olajuwon provided the team with 16.4 points, 9.8 rebounds, 1.8 steals and 2.0 blocks per game. In addition, Barkley provided with 15.2 points and 11.7 rebounds per game, while second-year guard, and three-point specialist Matt Maloney contributed 8.6 points per game, and led the Rockets with 126 three-point field goals, and Mario Elie and Eddie Johnson both averaged 8.4 points per game each. Meanwhile, three-point specialist Matt Bullard provided with 7.0 points per game, second-year forward Othella Harrington averaged 6.0 points and 3.6 rebounds per game, Rhodes contributed 5.8 points per game, and Brent Price provided with 5.6 points and 2.7 assists per game.

During the NBA All-Star weekend at Madison Square Garden in New York City, New York, Drexler won the inaugural NBA 2Ball Competition, along with Cynthia Cooper of the WNBA's Houston Comets. Meanwhile, Rhodes was selected for the NBA Rookie Game, as a member of the Western Conference Rookie team. Neither Drexler, Olajuwon or Barkley were selected for the 1998 NBA All-Star Game. The Rockets finished 17th in the NBA in home-game attendance, with an attendance of 670,117 at The Summit during the regular season.

=== NBA playoffs ===
In the Western Conference First Round of the 1998 NBA playoffs, and for the second consecutive year, and the fourth time in five years, the Rockets faced off against the top–seeded, and Midwest Division champion Utah Jazz, who were led by the trio of All-Star forward Karl Malone, All-Star guard John Stockton, and Jeff Hornacek. In a rematch of last year's Western Conference Finals, and with the series tied at 1–1, the Rockets won Game 3 over the Jazz at home, 89–85 at The Summit to take a 2–1 series lead. However, Barkley suffered a torn triceps muscle injury in Game 4, in which the Rockets lost to the Jazz at home, 93–71. Without Barkley, the Rockets lost Game 5 to the Jazz on the road, 84–70 at the Delta Center, thus losing in a hard-fought five-game series. It was the first time that the Rockets lost in the opening round of the NBA playoffs since the 1990–91 season.

The Jazz would go on to lose in six games to the 2-time defending NBA champion Chicago Bulls in the 1998 NBA Finals for the second straight year.

=== Notable highlights ===
One notable highlight of the regular season occurred on December 6, 1997, in which the Rockets traveled to Mexico City, Mexico to play against the Dallas Mavericks at the Palacio de los Deportes (Sports Palace). Despite the Mavericks being the home team, the fans cheered for the Rockets. The Rockets defeated the Mavericks by a score of 108–106, in front of a sellout crowd of 20,635 fans in attendance; Barkley led the team with 19 points, 17 rebounds and 6 assists. It was the first ever NBA regular season game played in Mexico.

=== Aftermath ===
This was also the final season for Drexler, who received a standing ovation after the Rockets' Game 5 loss to the Jazz at the Delta Center; he then retired to take over the head coaching job at the University of Houston, where he had played college basketball along with Olajuwon, ending his 15-year career in the NBA. Also following the season, Willis was traded to the Toronto Raptors, while Elie signed as a free agent with the San Antonio Spurs, and reserve defensive center Charles Jones, the oldest player in the league during the season, retired at age 41.

== Offseason ==
=== Draft picks ===
Round	Pick	Player	Position	Nationality	College
1	24	Rodrick Rhodes	SG	United States	USC
2	29	Serge Zwikker	C	Netherlands	North Carolina

== Roster ==
1997–98 Houston Rockets roster
Players

Pos.	No.	Player	Height	Weight	DOB	From
F	4	Charles Barkley	6 ft 6 in (1.98 m)	252 lb (114 kg)	1963–02–20	Auburn
F	50	Matt Bullard	6 ft 10 in (2.08 m)	215 lb (98 kg)	1967–06–05	Iowa
G	15	Emanual Davis	6 ft 4 in (1.93 m)	195 lb (88 kg)	1968–08–27	Delaware State
G	22	Clyde Drexler	6 ft 7 in (2.01 m)	210 lb (95 kg)	1962–06–22	Houston
G/F	17	Mario Elie	6 ft 5 in (1.96 m)	210 lb (95 kg)	1963–11–26	American International
F/C	32	Othella Harrington	6 ft 9 in (2.06 m)	235 lb (107 kg)	1974–01–31	Georgetown
F	8	Eddie Johnson	6 ft 7 in (2.01 m)	215 lb (98 kg)	1959–05–01	Illinois
F/C	27	Charles Jones	6 ft 9 in (2.06 m)	215 lb (98 kg)	1957–04–03	Albany State
G	12	Matt Maloney	6 ft 3 in (1.91 m)	192 lb (87 kg)	1971–12–06	Penn
C	34	Hakeem Olajuwon	7 ft 0 in (2.13 m)	255 lb (116 kg)	1963–01–21	Houston
G	20	Brent Price	6 ft 1 in (1.85 m)	165 lb (75 kg)	1968–12–09	Oklahoma
G/F	1	Rodrick Rhodes	6 ft 6 in (1.98 m)	225 lb (102 kg)	1973–09–24	USC
F	41	Joe Stephens	6 ft 7 in (2.01 m)	210 lb (95 kg)	1973–01–28	Little Rock
F/C	42	Kevin Willis	7 ft 0 in (2.13 m)	220 lb (100 kg)	1962–09–06	Michigan State

Coaches
Head coach
- Rudy Tomjanovich
Assistant(s)
- Bill Berry
- Jim Boylen
- Larry Smith

Legend
- (DP) Unsigned draft pick
- (FA) Free agent
- (S) Suspended
- Injured

Roster

=== Roster Notes ===
- Rookie center Serge Zwikker was placed on the inactive list, and never played for the Rockets.

== Regular season ==
=== Season standings ===
Midwest Division	W	L	PCT	GB	Home	Road	Div
z-Utah Jazz	62	20	.756	–	36–5	26–15	22–2
x-San Antonio Spurs	56	26	.683	6	31–10	25–16	18–6
x-Minnesota Timberwolves	45	37	.549	17	26–15	19–22	14–10
x-Houston Rockets	41	41	.500	21	24–17	17–24	14–10
Dallas Mavericks	20	62	.244	42	13–28	7–34	9–15
Vancouver Grizzlies	19	63	.232	43	14–27	5–36	4–20
Denver Nuggets	11	71	.134	51	9–32	2–39	3–21

#	Western Conference				
#	Team	W	L	PCT	GB
1	z-Utah Jazz	62	20	.756	–
2	y-Seattle SuperSonics	61	21	.744	1
3	x-Los Angeles Lakers	61	21	.744	1
4	x-Phoenix Suns	56	26	.683	6
5	x-San Antonio Spurs	56	26	.683	6
6	x-Portland Trail Blazers	46	36	.561	16
7	x-Minnesota Timberwolves	45	37	.549	17
8	x-Houston Rockets	41	41	.500	21
9	Sacramento Kings	27	55	.329	35
10	Dallas Mavericks	20	62	.244	42
11	Vancouver Grizzlies	19	63	.232	43
12	Golden State Warriors	19	63	.232	43
13	Los Angeles Clippers	17	65	.207	45
14	Denver Nuggets	11	71	.134	51

z – clinched division title
y – clinched division title
x – clinched playoff spot

== Playoffs ==
1998 playoff game log
First Round: 2–3 (home: 1–1; road: 1–2)

Game	Date	Team	Score	High points	High rebounds	High assists	Location Attendance	Series
1	April 23	@ Utah	W 103–90	Clyde Drexler (22)	Kevin Willis (14)	Clyde Drexler (6)	Delta Center; 19,911	1–0
2	April 25	@ Utah	L 90–105	Hakeem Olajuwon (16)	Kevin Willis (12)	Matt Maloney (6)	Delta Center; 19,911	1–1
3	April 29	Utah	W 89–85	Hakeem Olajuwon (28)	Hakeem Olajuwon (12)	Drexler, Maloney (5)	The Summit; 16,285	2–1
4	May 1	Utah	L 71–93	Hakeem Olajuwon (27)	Hakeem Olajuwon (15)	Clyde Drexler (5)	The Summit; 16,285	2–2
5	May 3	@ Utah	L 70–84	Kevin Willis (16)	Kevin Willis (11)	three players tied (3)	Delta Center; 19,911	2–3

1998 schedule

== Player statistics ==
Legend
GP	Games played	GS	Games started	MPG	Minutes per game
FG%	Field-goal percentage	3P%	3-point field-goal percentage	FT%	Free-throw percentage
RPG	Rebounds per game	APG	Assists per game	SPG	Steals per game
BPG	Blocks per game	PPG	Points per game

=== Season ===
Player	GP	GS	MPG	FG%	3FG%	FT%	RPG	APG	SPG	BPG	PPG
Charles Barkley	68	41	33.0	.485	.214	.746	11.7	3.2	1.0	.4	15.2
Matt Bullard	67	24	17.8	.450	.416	.741	2.2	.9	.5	.4	7.0
Emanual Davis	45	0	13.3	.444	.375	.838	1.0	1.3	.4	.1	4.1
Clyde Drexler	70	70	35.3	.427	.317	.801	4.9	5.5	1.8	.6	18.4
Mario Elie	73	59	27.2	.452	.291	.833	2.1	3.0	1.1	.1	8.4
Othella Harrington	58	3	15.6	.485	.000	.754	3.6	.4	.2	.5	6.0
Eddie Johnson	75	1	19.9	.417	.333	.831	2.0	1.2	.4	.0	8.4
Charles Jones	24	0	5.3	.700		.500	1.0	.2	.0	.3	.6
Matt Maloney	78	78	28.4	.408	.364	.833	1.8	2.8	.8	.1	8.6
Hakeem Olajuwon	47	45	34.7	.483	.000	.755	9.8	3.0	1.8	2.0	16.4
Brent Price	72	2	18.5	.413	.390	.786	1.5	2.7	.7	.1	5.6
Rodrick Rhodes	58	13	18.4	.367	.250	.617	1.2	1.9	1.1	.2	5.8
Joe Stephens	7	0	5.3	.357	.300	.667	.9	.1	.3	.0	3.9
Kevin Willis	81	74	31.2	.510	.143	.793	8.4	1.0	.7	.5	16.1

=== Playoffs ===
Player	GP	GS	MPG	FG%	3FG%	FT%	RPG	APG	SPG	BPG	PPG
Charles Barkley	4	0	21.8	.522	.000	.571	5.3	1.0	1.3	.0	9.0
Matt Bullard	5	4	14.0	.333	.300	1.000	1.6	1.0	.2	.0	3.4
Clyde Drexler	5	5	36.4	.309	.192	.757	5.4	4.6	1.6	.6	15.0
Mario Elie	5	1	26.6	.444	.333	.667	2.6	1.2	.4	.0	6.6
Othella Harrington	3	0	7.7	.500	.000	.800	2.3	.0	.0	.3	5.3
Eddie Johnson	5	0	17.8	.333	.300	.875	1.6	.2	.0	.0	5.6
Charles Jones	4	0	2.8			1.000	.8	.3	.0	.0	.5
Matt Maloney	5	5	33.0	.333	.250	.889	1.6	3.6	.4	.4	6.6
Hakeem Olajuwon	5	5	38.0	.394	.000	.727	10.8	2.4	1.0	3.2	20.4
Brent Price	5	0	15.0	.400	.385	.667	1.8	1.2	.8	.0	3.8
Rodrick Rhodes	3	0	2.3	.667		.500	.3	.0	.3	.0	2.0
Kevin Willis	5	5	33.6	.400	.000	.750	10.6	1.0	1.6	.6	11.2

Player statistics citation:

== See also ==
- 1997–98 NBA season
