= 1997–98 Los Angeles Lakers season =

NBA professional basketball team season

- Head coach: Del Harris
- General manager: Jerry West
- Owner: Jerry Buss
- Arena: Great Western Forum

Results
- Record: 61–21 (.744)
- Place: Division: 2nd (Pacific); Conference: 3rd (Western)
- Playoff finish: Western Conference finals (lost to Jazz 0–4)
- Stats at Basketball Reference

Local media
- Television: KCAL-TV; Fox Sports West
- Radio: KLAC

The 1997–98 Los Angeles Lakers season was the 50th season for the Los Angeles Lakers in the National Basketball Association, and their 38th season in Los Angeles, California.

== Season summary ==
=== Off-season ===
During the off-season, the Lakers signed free agents Rick Fox, and three-point specialist Jon Barry.

=== Regular season ===
With the addition of Fox, the Lakers got off to a fast start to the regular season by winning their first eleven games, before losing Shaquille O'Neal to a strained stomach muscle that forced him to sit out 20 games; in his absence, the team posted a 13–7 record. In January, Nick Van Exel suffered a knee injury missing 18 games, and was replaced with second-year guard Derek Fisher as the team's starting point guard for the remainder of the season. The Lakers held a 34–11 record at the All-Star break, and won 22 of their final 25 games to tie the Pacific Division title with the Seattle SuperSonics with a 61–21 record, earning the third seed in the Western Conference. It was the team's best record since the 1989–90 season.

O'Neal averaged 28.3 points, 11.4 rebounds and 2.4 blocks per game, and was named to the All-NBA First Team, while Eddie Jones averaged 16.9 points and 2.0 steals per game, led the Lakers with 143 three-point field goals, and was named to the NBA All-Defensive Second Team, and second-year guard Kobe Bryant emerged as a star in his second season, playing an increased role as the team's sixth man off the bench, averaging 15.4 points per game. In addition, Van Exel provided the team with 13.8 points and 6.9 assists per game, and contributed 123 three-point field goals, while Fox contributed 12.0 points per game, and Robert Horry averaged 7.4 points, 7.5 rebounds, 1.6 steals and 1.3 blocks per game. Meanwhile, Elden Campbell provided with 10.1 points, 5.6 rebounds and 1.3 blocks per game, Fisher contributed 5.8 points and 4.1 assists per game, and Corie Blount averaged 3.6 points and 4.3 rebounds per game.

During the NBA All-Star weekend at Madison Square Garden in New York City, New York, four members of the team, O'Neal, Bryant, Jones and Van Exel, were all selected for the 1998 NBA All-Star Game, as members of the Western Conference All-Star team; it was Bryant's first ever All-Star appearance, and the first and only All-Star appearance for Van Exel. Despite playing a sixth man role off the bench, Bryant was voted by the fans as the starting shooting guard for the Western Conference at the age of 19; he scored 18 points in 22 minutes, despite the Western Conference losing to the Eastern Conference, 135–114. In addition, Bryant also participated in the inaugural NBA 2Ball Competition, along with Lisa Leslie of the WNBA's Los Angeles Sparks. O'Neal finished in fourth place in Most Valuable Player voting, while Bryant finished in second place in Sixth Man of the Year voting, behind Danny Manning of the Phoenix Suns, and also finished in seventh place in Most Improved Player voting.

The Lakers finished 15th in the NBA in home-game attendance, with an attendance of 676,101 at the Great Western Forum during the regular season.

=== NBA playoffs ===
In the Western Conference First Round of the 1998 NBA playoffs, and for the second consecutive year, the Lakers faced off against the 6th–seeded Portland Trail Blazers, a team that featured Isaiah Rider, Arvydas Sabonis and Rasheed Wallace. The Lakers won the first two games over the Trail Blazers at home at the Great Western Forum, before losing Game 3 on the road, 99–94 at the Rose Garden Arena. The Lakers won Game 4 over the Trail Blazers on the road, 110–99 to win the series in four games.

In the Western Conference Semi-finals, the team faced off against the 2nd–seeded, and Pacific Division champion SuperSonics, who were led by the All-Star trio of Gary Payton, Vin Baker and Detlef Schrempf. Despite both teams finishing with the same regular-season record, the SuperSonics had home-court advantage in the series. The Lakers lost Game 1 to the SuperSonics on the road, 106–92 at the KeyArena at Seattle Center, but managed to win Game 2 on the road, 92–68. The Lakers won their next two home games at the Great Western Forum, before winning Game 5 over the SuperSonics at the KeyArena at Seattle Center, 110–95 to win the series in five games.

In the Western Conference Finals, and also for the second consecutive year, the Lakers faced off against the top–seeded, and Midwest Division champion Utah Jazz, who were led by the trio of All-Star forward Karl Malone, All-Star guard John Stockton, and Jeff Hornacek. The Lakers lost the first two games to the Jazz on the road, which included a 35-point margin loss in Game 1, 112–77 at the Delta Center; the Lakers struggled only shooting .295 in field-goal percentage in Game 1. The Lakers lost the next two games at home, including a Game 4 loss to the Jazz at the Great Western Forum, 96–92, thus losing the series in a four-game sweep.

The Jazz would go on to lose in six games to the 2-time defending NBA champion Chicago Bulls in the 1998 NBA Finals for the second consecutive year.

=== Aftermath ===
Following the season, Van Exel was traded to the Denver Nuggets on draft day after five seasons with the Lakers, and after feuding with head coach Del Harris, and Barry signed as a free agent with the Sacramento Kings.

== Draft picks ==
Round	Pick	Player	Position	Nationality	College
2	52	DeJuan Wheat	PG	United States	Louisville
2	54	Paul Rogers	C	Australia	Gonzaga

== Roster ==
1997–98 Los Angeles Lakers roster
Players

Pos.	No.	Player	Height	Weight	DOB	From
G	20	Jon Barry	6 ft 4 in (1.93 m)	195 lb (88 kg)	1969–07–25	Georgia Tech
F	23	Mario Bennett	6 ft 6 in (1.98 m)	235 lb (107 kg)	1973–08–01	Arizona State
F	43	Corie Blount	6 ft 9 in (2.06 m)	240 lb (109 kg)	1969–01–04	Cincinnati
G	8	Kobe Bryant	6 ft 6 in (1.98 m)	205 lb (93 kg)	1978–08–23	Lower Merion HS
C	41	Elden Campbell	6 ft 11 in (2.11 m)	215 lb (98 kg)	1968–07–23	Clemson
G	2	Derek Fisher	6 ft 1 in (1.85 m)	210 lb (95 kg)	1974–08–09	Little Rock
F	17	Rick Fox	6 ft 7 in (2.01 m)	230 lb (104 kg)	1969–07–24	North Carolina
F	5	Robert Horry	6 ft 10 in (2.08 m)	220 lb (100 kg)	1970–08–25	Alabama
G	6	Eddie Jones	6 ft 6 in (1.98 m)	190 lb (86 kg)	1971–10–20	Temple
C	34	Shaquille O'Neal	7 ft 1 in (2.16 m)	325 lb (147 kg)	1972–03–06	LSU
C	45	Sean Rooks	6 ft 10 in (2.08 m)	250 lb (113 kg)	1969–09–09	Arizona
G	24	Shea Seals	6 ft 5 in (1.96 m)	210 lb (95 kg)	1975–08–26	Tulsa
G	9	Nick Van Exel	6 ft 1 in (1.85 m)	170 lb (77 kg)	1971–11–27	Cincinnati

Coaches
Head coach
- Del Harris
Assistant(s)
- Bill Bertka
- Larry Drew
- Kurt Rambis

Legend
- (DP) Unsigned draft pick
- (FA) Free agent
- (S) Suspended
- Injured

Roster
Updated: October 20, 1997

== Regular season ==
=== Season standings ===
Pacific Division	W	L	PCT	GB	Home	Road	Div
y-Seattle SuperSonics	61	21	.744	–	35–6	26–15	19–5
x-Los Angeles Lakers	61	21	.744	–	33–8	28–13	16–8
x-Phoenix Suns	56	26	.683	5	30–11	26–15	17–7
x-Portland Trail Blazers	46	36	.561	15	26–15	20–21	14–10
Sacramento Kings	27	55	.329	34	21–20	6–35	6–18
Golden State Warriors	19	63	.232	42	12–29	7–34	6–18
Los Angeles Clippers	17	65	.207	44	11–30	6–35	6–18

#	Western Conference				
#	Team	W	L	PCT	GB
1	z-Utah Jazz	62	20	.756	–
2	y-Seattle SuperSonics	61	21	.744	1
3	x-Los Angeles Lakers	61	21	.744	1
4	x-Phoenix Suns	56	26	.683	6
5	x-San Antonio Spurs	56	26	.683	6
6	x-Portland Trail Blazers	46	36	.561	16
7	x-Minnesota Timberwolves	45	37	.549	17
8	x-Houston Rockets	41	41	.500	21
9	Sacramento Kings	27	55	.329	35
10	Dallas Mavericks	20	62	.244	42
11	Vancouver Grizzlies	19	63	.232	43
12	Golden State Warriors	19	63	.232	43
13	Los Angeles Clippers	17	65	.207	45
14	Denver Nuggets	11	71	.134	51

== Game log ==
=== Preseason ===
1997 preseason game log
Total: 6–2 (home: 6–0; road: 0–2)
Preseason: 6–2 (home: 6–0; road: 0–2)

Game	Date	Team	Score	High points	High rebounds	High assists	Location Attendance	Record
1	October 9	Denver	W 135-102	Kobe Bryant (31)	Corie Blount (7)	Jon Barry (6)	San Diego Sports Arena (San Diego, CA); 10,754	1–0
2	October 10	@ Phoenix	L 91-93	Shaquille O'Neal (27)	Shaquille O'Neal (15)	Shaquille O'Neal (4)	American West Arena; 19,023	1-1
3	October 17	L.A. Clippers	W 116-85	Shaquille O'Neal (28)	Shaquille O'Neal (10)	Fisher & Van Exel (5)	Kiel Center (St. Louis, MO); 17,398	2–1
4	October 18	Cleveland	W 117-107	Shaquille O'Neal (34)	Shaquille O'Neal (9)	Rick Fox (7)	Great Western Forum; 18,123	3–1
5	October 21	@ Denver	L 92-101	Bryant & Campbell (15)	Mario Bennett (11)	Kobe Bryant (4)	McNichols Sports Arena; 7,121	3–2
6	October 22	Washington	W 124-113 (OT)	Elden Campbell (33)	Elden Campbell (13)	Barry & Horry (4)	Thomas & Mack Center (Las Vegas, NV); 10,771	4–2
7	October 24	Atlanta	W 93-89	Rick Fox (18)	Elden Campbell (12)	Nick Van Exel (9)	Great Western Forum; 11,814	5–2
8	October 25	Seattle	W 85-79	Nick Van Exel (15)	Corie Blount (9)	Derek Fisher (5)	Great Western Forum; 13,862	6–2

1997–98 schedule

=== Regular season ===
1997–98 game log
Total: 61-21 (home: 33-8; road: 28–13)
October: 1–0 (home: 1–0; road: 0–0)

Game	Date	Team	Score	High points	High rebounds	High assists	Location Attendance	Record
1	October 31	Utah	W 104-87	Kobe Bryant (23)	Robert Horry (13)	Horry & Van Exel (7)	Great Western Forum; 16,234	1–0

November: 12–2 (home: 6–0; road: 6–2)

Game	Date	Team	Score	High points	High rebounds	High assists	Location Attendance	Record
2	November 4	@ Sacramento	W 101-98	Eddie Jones (35)	Corie Blount (7)	Nick Van Exel (6)	ARCO Arena; 17,317	2–0
3	November 7	New York	W 99-94	Horry & O'Neal (17)	Robert Horry (10)	Nick Van Exel (6)	Great Western Forum; 17,505	3–0
4	November 9	Golden State	W 132-97	Shaquille O'Neal (27)	Shaquille O'Neal (19)	Derek Fisher (10)	Great Western Forum; 14,623	4–0
5	November 11	@ Dallas	W 118-96	Shaquille O'Neal (37)	Shaquille O'Neal (12)	Robert Horry (9)	Reunion Arena; 13,722	5–0
6	November 13	@ San Antonio	W 109-100 (OT)	Shaquille O'Neal (34)	Shaquille O'Neal (15)	Eddie Jones (7)	Alamodome; 20,557	6–0
7	November 14	@ Houston	W 113-103 (2OT)	Nick Van Exel (35)	Shaquille O'Neal (13)	Shaquille O'Neal (8)	Compaq Center; 16,285	7–0
8	November 16	Vancouver	W 121-95	Eddie Jones (28)	Robert Horry (12)	Nick Van Exel (8)	Great Western Forum; 17,139	8–0
9	November 18	@ Utah	W 97-92	Bryant & Van Exel (19)	Shaquille O'Neal (9)	Nick Van Exel (5)	Delta Center; 19,911	9–0
10	November 19	Minnesota	W 118-93	Eddie Jones (31)	Shaquille O'Neal (12)	Derek Fisher (9)	Great Western Forum; 17,505	10–0
11	November 23	L.A. Clippers	W 119-102	Eddie Jones (28)	Corie Blount (9)	Nick Van Exel (11)	Great Western Forum; 17,505	11–0
12	November 25	@ Miami	L 86-103	Nick Van Exel (21)	3 players tied (7)	Eddie Jones (6)	Miami Arena; 15,200	11–1
13	November 26	@ Boston	W 118-103	Elden Campbell (22)	Robert Horry (9)	Nick Van Exel (9)	Fleet Center; 18,624	12–1
14	November 28	@ Philadelphia	L 95-105	Bryant & Campbell (19)	Robert Horry (9)	Nick Van Exel (6)	CoreStates Center; 20,714	12–2
15	November 30	Toronto	W 105-99	Eddie Jones (32)	Blount & Horry (8)	Nick Van Exel (10)	Great Western Forum; 14,940	13–2

December: 10–5 (home: 5–2; road: 5–3)

Game	Date	Team	Score	High points	High rebounds	High assists	Location Attendance	Record
16	December 3	@ Denver	W 107-89	Elden Campbell (25)	Elden Campbell (12)	Kobe Bryant (5)	McNichols Sports Arena; 14,503	14–2
17	December 5	San Antonio	W 98-88	Nick Van Exel (25)	Corie Blount (10)	Nick Van Exel (6)	Great Western Forum; 17,505	15–2
18	December 7	Cleveland	L 84-94	Kobe Bryant (21)	Robert Horry (10)	Nick Van Exel (4)	Great Western Forum; 16,945	15–3
19	December 8	@ Portland	L 99-105	Nick Van Exel (24)	Elden Campbell (12)	Nick Van Exel (12)	Rose Garden; 20,721	15–4
20	December 10	@ Golden State	L 92-93	Kobe Bryant (20)	Elden Campbell (9)	Nick Van Exel (8)	The Arena in Oakland; 13,414	15–5
21	December 12	Houston	W 119-102	Rick Fox (30)	Robert Horry (8)	Nick Van Exel (8)	Great Western Forum; 17,505	16–5
22	December 14	Dallas	W 119-89	Kobe Bryant (30)	Elden Campbell (8)	Fisher & Van Exel (7)	Great Western Forum; 15,893	17–5
23	December 16	@ Minnesota	W 109-96	Eddie Jones (32)	4 players tied (6)	Nick Van Exel (14)	Target Center; 16,874	18–5
24	December 17	@ Chicago	L 83-104	Kobe Bryant (33)	Robert Horry (6)	Nick Van Exel (5)	United Center; 24,119	18–6
25	December 19	@ Atlanta	W 98-96	Kobe Bryant (19)	Robert Horry (8)	Nick Van Exel (7)	Georgia Dome; 25,288	19–6
26	December 20	@ Charlotte	W 109-100	Nick Van Exel (24)	Corie Blount (11)	Nick Van Exel (8)	Charlotte Coliseum; 24,042	20–6
27	December 22	@ Houston	W 94-83	Kobe Bryant (19)	Elden Campbell (14)	Nick Van Exel (10)	Compaq Center; 16,285	21–6
28	December 26	L.A. Clippers	W 118-114 (OT)	Nick Van Exel (30)	Elden Campbell (11)	Nick Van Exel (12)	Great Western Forum; 17,505	22–6
29	December 28	Boston	L 102-108	Rick Fox (27)	3 players tied (9)	Nick Van Exel (10)	Great Western Forum; 17,505	22–7
30	December 30	Sacramento	W 93-80	Elden Campbell (23)	Elden Campbell (9)	Nick Van Exel (11)	Great Western Forum; 16,283	23–7

January: 9–4 (home: 6–3; road: 3–1)

Game	Date	Team	Score	High points	High rebounds	High assists	Location Attendance	Record
31	January 2	Atlanta	W 116-106	Eddie Jones (23)	Shaquille O'Neal (9)	Nick Van Exel (13)	Great Western Forum; 17,505	24–7
32	January 4	Philadelphia	L 107-113	Shaquille O'Neal (26)	Shaquille O'Neal (16)	Nick Van Exel (9)	Great Western Forum; 17,505	24–8
33	January 6	@ Vancouver	W 100-87	Shaquille O'Neal (25)	Shaquille O'Neal (14)	Nick Van Exel (7)	General Motors Place; 15,837	25–8
34	January 7	Milwaukee	W 114-102	Shaquille O'Neal (38)	Horry & O'Neal (9)	Nick Van Exel (18)	Great Western Forum; 15,483	26–8
35	January 9	@ L.A. Clippers	W 125-115	Shaquille O'Neal (32)	Elden Campbell (10)	Nick Van Exel (5)	Los Angeles Memorial Sports Arena; 16,067	27–8
36	January 11	Charlotte	L 93-98	Shaquille O'Neal (32)	Shaquille O'Neal (13)	Eddie Jones (7)	Great Western Forum; 17,505	27–9
37	January 14	Denver	W 132-114	Shaquille O'Neal (34)	Shaquille O'Neal (10)	Derek Fisher (13)	Great Western Forum; 15,067	28–9
38	January 17	Miami	W 108-99	Shaquille O'Neal (24)	Shaquille O'Neal (14)	Nick Van Exel (4)	Great Western Forum; 17,505	29–9
39	January 19	Orlando	W 92-89	Shaquille O'Neal (35)	Shaquille O'Neal (15)	Robert Horry (7)	Great Western Forum; 17,505	30–9
40	January 21	@ Phoenix	W 119-109	Shaquille O'Neal (26)	Shaquille O'Neal (11)	Nick Van Exel (6)	American West Arena; 19,023	31–9
41	January 24	@ Seattle	L 95-101	Shaquille O'Neal (30)	Shaquille O'Neal (12)	Nick Van Exel (8)	KeyArena; 17,072	31–10
42	January 28	New Jersey	L 95-106	Shaquille O'Neal (27)	Shaquille O'Neal (19)	Nick Van Exel (8)	Great Western Forum; 15,643	31–11
43	January 30	Minnesota	W 121-114	Rick Fox (30)	Shaquille O'Neal (17)	Derek Fisher (9)	Great Western Forum; 17,505	32–11

February: 7–5 (home: 4–2; road: 3–3)

Game	Date	Team	Score	High points	High rebounds	High assists	Location Attendance	Record
44	February 1	Chicago	W 112-87	Rick Fox (25)	Corie Blount (13)	Blount & Fisher (7)	Great Western Forum; 17,505	33–11
45	February 4	Portland	W 122-115	Eddie Jones (28)	Shaquille O'Neal (10)	Nick Van Exel (11)	Great Western Forum; 15,389	34–11
All-Star Break
46	February 10	@ Portland	L 105-117	Shaquille O'Neal (31)	Shaquille O'Neal (12)	Barry & Fox (6)	Rose Garden; 21,538	34–12
47	February 11	Golden State	W 105-99	Shaquille O'Neal (33)	Shaquille O'Neal (10)	Nick Van Exel (14)	Great Western Forum; 14,674	35–12
48	February 13	Seattle	L 108-113 (OT)	Shaquille O'Neal (44)	Robert Horry (14)	Eddie Jones (7)	Great Western Forum; 17,505	35–13
49	February 15	Houston	L 88-90	3 players tied (18)	Shaquille O'Neal (13)	Nick Van Exel (9)	Great Western Forum; 17,505	35–14
50	February 18	@ Phoenix	L 103-110	Shaquille O'Neal (30)	Shaquille O'Neal (10)	Derek Fisher (5)	American West Arena; 19,023	35–15
51	February 19	Denver	W 131-92	Rick Fox (22)	Mario Bennett (13)	Kobe Bryant (7)	Great Western Forum; 15,159	36–15
52	February 22	@ Orlando	L 94-96	Shaquille O'Neal (20)	Shaquille O'Neal (10)	Fisher & Fox (5)	Orlando Arena; 17,238	36–16
53	February 24	@ Milwaukee	W 98-81	Shaquille O'Neal (21)	Shaquille O'Neal (12)	Derek Fisher (6)	Bradley Center; 18,717	37–16
54	February 25	@ Indiana	W 96-89	Shaquille O'Neal (24)	Horry & O'Neal (9)	Derek Fisher (6)	Market Square Arena; 16,726	38–16
55	February 27	@ Minnesota	W 104-91	Shaquille O'Neal (35)	Robert Horry (8)	Derek Fisher (8)	Target Center; 20,197	39–16

March: 13–4 (home: 8–0; road: 5–4)

Game	Date	Team	Score	High points	High rebounds	High assists	Location Attendance	Record
56	March 1	@ New York	L 89-101	Shaquille O'Neal (19)	Robert Horry (12)	Shaquille O'Neal (5)	Madison Square Garden; 19,763	39–17
57	March 2	@ Washington	L 86-96	Shaquille O'Neal (28)	Shaquille O'Neal (15)	Derek Fisher (10)	MCI Center; 20,674	39–18
58	March 4	Indiana	W 104-95	Shaquille O'Neal (29)	Shaquille O'Neal (12)	Derek Fisher (7)	Great Western Forum; 17,505	40–18
59	March 6	San Antonio	W 91-84	Shaquille O'Neal (23)	Elden Campbell (7)	Fisher & Fox (5)	Great Western Forum; 17,505	41–18
60	March 8	Detroit	W 96-89	Shaquille O'Neal (32)	Shaquille O'Neal (13)	Derek Fisher (11)	Great Western Forum; 17,505	42–18
61	March 11	Portland	W 121-107	Shaquille O'Neal (33)	Elden Campbell (11)	Derek Fisher (10)	Great Western Forum; 16,758	43–18
62	March 12	@ L.A. Clippers	W 108-85	Shaquille O'Neal (32)	Robert Horry (14)	Rick Fox (5)	Arrowhead Pond; 18,521	44–18
63	March 15	@ Vancouver	W 119-110	Shaquille O'Neal (24)	Robert Horry (13)	3 players tied (6)	General Motors Place; 18,983	45–18
64	March 16	@ Seattle	L 89-101	Shaquille O'Neal (25)	Shaquille O'Neal (8)	Fox & Jones (4)	KeyArena; 17,072	45–19
65	March 18	Phoenix	W 99-93	Shaquille O'Neal (33)	Shaquille O'Neal (22)	Nick Van Exel (7)	Great Western Forum; 17,505	46–19
66	March 20	Seattle	W 93-80	Shaquille O'Neal (24)	Shaquille O'Neal (16)	Rick Fox (7)	Great Western Forum; 17,505	47–19
67	March 22	@ Sacramento	W 96-93	Shaquille O'Neal (33)	Robert Horry (14)	Nick Van Exel (5)	ARCO Arena; 17,317	48–19
68	March 23	@ Denver	W 107-86	Eddie Jones (27)	Shaquille O'Neal (9)	Nick Van Exel (6)	McNichols Sports Arena; 17,171	49–19
69	March 25	Sacramento	W 114-91	Shaquille O'Neal (25)	Shaquille O'Neal (14)	Nick Van Exel (6)	Great Western Forum; 16,634	50–19
70	March 28	@ Utah	L 91-106	Shaquille O'Neal (31)	Robert Horry (7)	Nick Van Exel (6)	Delta Center; 19,911	50–20
71	March 29	Washington	W 116-89	Shaquille O'Neal (33)	Shaquille O'Neal (13)	Derek Fisher (9)	Great Western Forum; 17,505	51–20
72	March 31	@ Toronto	W 114-105	Rick Fox (31)	Shaquille O'Neal (13)	Derek Fisher (7)	Maple Leaf Gardens; 16,086	52–20

April: 9–1 (home: 3–1; road: 6–0)

Game	Date	Team	Score	High points	High rebounds	High assists	Location Attendance	Record
73	April 2	@ New Jersey	W 117-106	Shaquille O'Neal (50)	Robert Horry (10)	Nick Van Exel (6)	Continental Airlines Arena; 20,049	53–20
74	April 3	@ Cleveland	W 105-93	Shaquille O'Neal (26)	Shaquille O'Neal (11)	Nick Van Exel (6)	Gund Arena; 20,562	54–20
75	April 5	@ Detroit	W 105-103 (OT)	Shaquille O'Neal (35)	Shaquille O'Neal (12)	Nick Van Exel (4)	The Palace of Auburn Hills; 22,076	55–20
76	April 8	Vancouver	W 113-102	Shaquille O'Neal (30)	Corie Blount (15)	Nick Van Exel (6)	Great Western Forum; 17,505	56–20
77	April 10	Phoenix	L 105-114	Shaquille O'Neal (24)	Mario Bennett (14)	Fox & Van Exel (7)	Great Western Forum; 17,505	56–21
78	April 11	@ Golden State	W 96-84	Shaquille O'Neal (35)	Shaquille O'Neal (15)	Rick Fox (6)	The Arena in Oakland; 19,821	57–21
79	April 13	@ San Antonio	W 99-75	Shaquille O'Neal (28)	Shaquille O'Neal (16)	Derek Fisher (6)	Alamodome; 26,783	58–21
80	April 14	@ Dallas	W 111-95	Shaquille O'Neal (34)	Robert Horry (13)	Derek Fisher (9)	Reunion Arena; 18,107	59–21
81	April 17	Dallas	W 124-95	Shaquille O'Neal (43)	Robert Horry (10)	Derek Fisher (10)	Great Western Forum; 17,505	60–21
82	April 19	Utah	W 102-98	Shaquille O'Neal (33)	Shaquille O'Neal (15)	Nick Van Exel (7)	Great Western Forum; 17,505	61–21

1997–98 schedule

=== Playoffs ===
1998 playoff game log
Total: 7–6 (home: 4–2; road: 3–4)
First round: 3–1 (home: 2–0; road: 1–1)

Game	Date	Team	Score	High points	High rebounds	High assists	Location Attendance	Series
1	April 24	Portland	W 104–102	Shaquille O'Neal (30)	Jones & O'Neal (7)	Robert Horry (5)	Great Western Forum; 17,505	1–0
2	April 26	Portland	W 108–99	Rick Fox (24)	Shaquille O'Neal (9)	Derek Fisher (7)	Great Western Forum; 17,505	2–0
3	April 28	@ Portland	L 94–99	Shaquille O'Neal (36)	Shaquille O'Neal (16)	Robert Horry (7)	Rose Garden; 21,558	2–1
4	April 30	@ Portland	W 110–99	Shaquille O'Neal (31)	Shaquille O'Neal (15)	Nick Van Exel (7)	Rose Garden; 21,558	3–1

Conference Semi-finals: 4–1 (home: 2–0; road: 2–1)

Game	Date	Team	Score	High points	High rebounds	High assists	Location Attendance	Series
1	May 4	@ Seattle	L 92–106	Shaquille O'Neal (27)	Shaquille O'Neal (11)	Rick Fox (10)	KeyArena; 17,072	0–1
2	May 6	@ Seattle	W 92–68	Shaquille O'Neal (26)	Horry & O'Neal (10)	Derek Fisher (7)	KeyArena; 17,072	1–1
3	May 8	Seattle	W 119–103	Shaquille O'Neal (30)	Shaquille O'Neal (10)	Derek Fisher (7)	Great Western Forum; 17,505	2–1
4	May 10	Seattle	W 112–100	Shaquille O'Neal (39)	Shaquille O'Neal (8)	O'Neal & Van Exel (7)	Great Western Forum; 17,505	3–1
5	May 12	@ Seattle	W 110–95	Shaquille O'Neal (31)	Robert Horry (11)	Derek Fisher (6)	KeyArena; 17,072	4–1

Conference finals: 0–4 (home: 0–2; road: 0–2)

Game	Date	Team	Score	High points	High rebounds	High assists	Location Attendance	Series
1	May 16	@ Utah	L 77–112	Shaquille O'Neal (19)	Corie Blount (9)	Nick Van Exel (3)	Delta Center; 19,911	0–1
2	May 18	@ Utah	L 95–99	Shaquille O'Neal (31)	Corie Blount (10)	Rick Fox (7)	Delta Center; 19,911	0–2
3	May 22	Utah	L 98–109	Shaquille O'Neal (39)	Shaquille O'Neal (15)	Nick Van Exel (7)	Great Western Forum; 17,505	0–3
4	May 24	Utah	L 92–96	Shaquille O'Neal (38)	Robert Horry (8)	Eddie Jones (6)	Great Western Forum; 17,505	0–4

1998 schedule

== Player statistics ==
Legend
GP	Games played	GS	Games started	MPG	Minutes per game
FG%	Field-goal percentage	3P%	3-point field-goal percentage	FT%	Free-throw percentage
RPG	Rebounds per game	APG	Assists per game	SPG	Steals per game
BPG	Blocks per game	PPG	Points per game

=== Regular season ===
Player	GP	GS	MPG	FG%	3FG%	FT%	RPG	APG	SPG	BPG	PPG
Jon Barry	49	1	7.6	.365	.295	.931	0.8	1.0	0.5	0.1	2.5
Mario Bennett	45	4	7.9	.593	.500	.364	2.8	0.4	0.4	0.2	3.9
Corie Blount	70	3	14.7	.572	.000	.500	4.3	0.5	0.4	0.4	3.6
Kobe Bryant	79	1	26.0	.428	.341	.794	3.1	2.5	0.9	0.5	15.4
Elden Campbell	81	28	22.0	.463	.500	.693	5.6	1.0	0.4	1.3	10.1
Derek Fisher	82	36	21.5	.434	.383	.757	2.4	4.1	0.9	0.1	5.8
Rick Fox	82	82	33.0	.471	.325	.743	4.4	3.4	1.2	0.6	12.0
Robert Horry	72	71	30.4	.476	.204	.692	7.5	2.3	1.6	1.3	7.4
Eddie Jones	80	80	36.4	.484	.389	.765	3.8	3.1	2.0	0.7	16.9
Shaquille O'Neal	60	57	36.3	.584	.	.527	11.4	2.4	0.7	2.4	28.3
Sean Rooks	41	1	10.4	.455	.	.595	2.9	0.6	0.0	0.6	3.4
Shea Seals	4	0	2.3	.125	.000	.500	1.0	.	0.3	.	1.0
Nick Van Exel	64	46	32.1	.419	.389	.791	2.5	6.9	1.0	0.1	13.8

=== Playoffs ===
Player	GP	GS	MPG	FG%	3FG%	FT%	RPG	APG	SPG	BPG	PPG
Jon Barry	7	0	2.6	.000	.000		.3	.0	.1	.0	.0
Mario Bennett	4	0	2.5	.500		1.000	1.5	.0	.0	.3	1.0
Corie Blount	12	0	17.4	.500		.636	5.3	.6	.5	.3	2.6
Kobe Bryant	11	0	20.0	.408	.214	.689	1.9	1.5	.3	.7	8.7
Elden Campbell	13	0	13.8	.451		.647	3.5	.6	.2	.9	5.2
Derek Fisher	13	13	21.4	.397	.300	.621	1.9	3.8	1.3	.0	6.0
Rick Fox	13	13	32.9	.447	.396	.826	4.5	3.9	.8	.2	10.9
Robert Horry	13	13	32.5	.557	.353	.683	6.5	3.1	1.1	1.1	8.6
Eddie Jones	13	13	36.6	.466	.417	.829	3.9	2.5	2.0	1.6	17.0
Shaquille O'Neal	13	13	38.5	.612		.503	10.2	2.9	.5	2.6	30.5
Sean Rooks	4	0	2.8	.333			.3	.0	.0	.8	1.0
Nick Van Exel	13	0	28.2	.331	.314	.725	2.5	4.2	.6	.1	11.6

== Awards and records ==
=== Awards ===
- Shaquille O'Neal was named to the All-NBA First Team
- Eddie Jones was named to the NBA All-Defensive Second Team

==== All-Star ====
- Kobe Bryant was selected to his first NBA All-Star Game.
- Eddie Jones was selected to his second NBA All-Star Game.
- Nick Van Exel was selected to his first NBA All-Star Game.
- Shaquille O'Neal was selected to his sixth NBA All-Star Game.

==== Weekly and monthly ====
- Shaquille O'Neal was named NBA Player of the Week for games played from November 9 through November 15.
- Eddie Jones was named NBA Player of the Month for November.
- Shaquille O'Neal was named NBA Player of the Month for January.
- Shaquille O'Neal was named NBA Player of the Week for games played from March 15 to March 21.
- Shaquille O'Neal was named NBA Player of the Month for April.
- Del Harris was named NBA Coach of the Month for April.
