= 1997–98 Los Angeles Clippers season =

NBA professional basketball team season

- Head coach: Bill Fitch
- Owners: Donald Sterling
- Arena: Los Angeles Memorial Sports Arena; Arrowhead Pond

Results
- Record: 17–65 (.207)
- Place: Division: 7th (Pacific); Conference: 13th (Western)
- Playoff finish: Did not qualify
- Stats at Basketball Reference

Local media
- Television: KCAL-TV; Fox Sports West 2 (Ralph Lawler, Bill Walton)
- Radio: KXTA (Rory Markas)

The 1997–98 Los Angeles Clippers season was the 28th season for the Los Angeles Clippers in the National Basketball Association, their 14th season in Los Angeles, California, and their fourth season in which they played occasional home games in Anaheim, California.

== Season summary ==
=== Off-season ===
The Clippers had the 14th overall pick in the 1997 NBA draft, and selected power forward Maurice Taylor from the University of Michigan. During the off-season, the team signed free agent James Robinson, and acquired Stojko Vrankovic from the Minnesota Timberwolves on draft day.

=== Regular season ===
Despite the addition of Taylor, the Clippers struggled losing 14 of their first 16 games of the regular season, as Loy Vaught suffered a back injury after only just ten games, and was out for the remainder of the season; Vaught averaged 7.5 points and 6.5 rebounds per game. After holding a 5–24 start to the season, the team managed to win four of their next five games, but then lost 12 of their next 13 games afterwards, and held an 11–37 record at the All-Star break. At mid-season, the team traded Brent Barry to the Miami Heat in exchange for last season's Most Improved Player Isaac Austin, and rookie shooting guard Charles Smith; before the trade, Barry averaged 13.7 points per game in 41 games. The Clippers lost 15 of their final 17 games of the season, including a 10-game losing streak between March and April, and finished in last place in the Pacific Division with a 17–65 record.

Lamond Murray showed improvement becoming the team's starting small forward, averaging 15.4 points, 6.1 rebounds and 1.5 steals per game, while Austin averaged 15.2 points and 8.7 rebounds per game in 26 games after the trade, and Rodney Rogers provided the team with 15.1 points and 5.6 rebounds per game. In addition, Taylor provided with 11.5 points and 4.2 rebounds per game, and was named to the NBA All-Rookie Second Team, while three-point specialist Eric Piatkowski contributed 11.3 points per game and 106 three-point field goals, Darrick Martin provided with 10.3 points and 4.0 assists per game, and led the Clippers with 107 three-point field goals, and second-year center Lorenzen Wright averaged 9.0 points, 8.8 rebounds and 1.3 blocks per game. Meanwhile, Robinson contributed 7.7 points per game, Pooh Richardson provided with 4.2 points and 3.3 assists per game, and Vrankovic averaged 3.0 points and 4.0 rebounds per game.

During the NBA All-Star weekend at Madison Square Garden in New York City, New York, Taylor was selected for the NBA Rookie Game, as a member of the Western Conference Rookie team. Murray finished tied in eighth place in Most Improved Player voting. For the fifth consecutive year, the Clippers finished last in the NBA in home-game attendance, with an attendance of 254,840 at the Los Angeles Memorial Sports Arena during the regular season, which was 29th in the league.

=== Aftermath ===
Following the season, Austin signed as a free agent with the Orlando Magic, while Vaught signed with the Detroit Pistons after eight seasons with the Clippers, and head coach Bill Fitch was fired after four seasons with the Clippers. Fitch's most losses record in NBA history with 1,106 losses stood for five years, until Lenny Wilkens would break his mark later on during the 2002–03 season while coaching for the Toronto Raptors.

== Draft picks ==
Round	Pick	Player	Position	Nationality	College
1	14	Maurice Taylor	PF	United States	Michigan

== Roster ==
1997–98 Los Angeles Clippers roster
Players

Pos.	No.	Player	Height	Weight	DOB	From
C	8	Isaac Austin	6 ft 10 in (2.08 m)	270 lb (122 kg)	––	Arizona State
C	33	Keith Closs	7 ft 3 in (2.21 m)	215 lb (98 kg)	––	Central Connecticut State
G	32	James Collins	6 ft 4 in (1.93 m)	196 lb (89 kg)	––	Florida State
G	15	Darrick Martin	5 ft 11 in (1.80 m)	170 lb (77 kg)	––	UCLA
F	7	Lamond Murray	6 ft 7 in (2.01 m)	236 lb (107 kg)	––	California
G	52	Eric Piatkowski	6 ft 7 in (2.01 m)	215 lb (98 kg)	––	Nebraska
G	24	Pooh Richardson	6 ft 1 in (1.85 m)	180 lb (82 kg)	––	UCLA
G	26	James Robinson	6 ft 2 in (1.88 m)	180 lb (82 kg)	––	Alabama
F	54	Rodney Rogers	6 ft 7 in (2.01 m)	260 lb (118 kg)	––	Wake Forest
G	14	Charles Smith	6 ft 5 in (1.96 m)	194 lb (88 kg)	––	New Mexico
F	23	Maurice Taylor	6 ft 9 in (2.06 m)	260 lb (118 kg)	––	Michigan
F	35	Loy Vaught	6 ft 9 in (2.06 m)	230 lb (104 kg)	––	Michigan
C	11	Stojko Vrankovic	7 ft 2 in (2.18 m)	260 lb (118 kg)	––	Croatia
F/C	55	Lorenzen Wright	6 ft 11 in (2.11 m)	240 lb (109 kg)	––	Memphis

Coaches
Head coach
- Bill Fitch
Assistant(s)
- Jim Brewer
- Barry Hecker
- Rex Kalamian

Legend
- (DP) Unsigned draft pick
- (FA) Free agent
- (S) Suspended
- Injured

Roster
Updated: 2009-10-04

=== Roster Notes ===
- Rookie center Keith Closs played for the Lakers during the pre-season and had a strong performance; when he was released to free agency, the Clippers quickly signed him to their roster.

== Regular season ==
=== Season standings ===
Pacific Division	W	L	PCT	GB	Home	Road	Div
y-Seattle SuperSonics	61	21	.744	–	35–6	26–15	19–5
x-Los Angeles Lakers	61	21	.744	–	33–8	28–13	16–8
x-Phoenix Suns	56	26	.683	5	30–11	26–15	17–7
x-Portland Trail Blazers	46	36	.561	15	26–15	20–21	14–10
Sacramento Kings	27	55	.329	34	21–20	6–35	6–18
Golden State Warriors	19	63	.232	42	12–29	7–34	6–18
Los Angeles Clippers	17	65	.207	44	11–30	6–35	6–18

#	Western Conference				
#	Team	W	L	PCT	GB
1	z-Utah Jazz	62	20	.756	–
2	y-Seattle SuperSonics	61	21	.744	1
3	x-Los Angeles Lakers	61	21	.744	1
4	x-Phoenix Suns	56	26	.683	6
5	x-San Antonio Spurs	56	26	.683	6
6	x-Portland Trail Blazers	46	36	.561	16
7	x-Minnesota Timberwolves	45	37	.549	17
8	x-Houston Rockets	41	41	.500	21
9	Sacramento Kings	27	55	.329	35
10	Dallas Mavericks	20	62	.244	42
11	Vancouver Grizzlies	19	63	.232	43
12	Golden State Warriors	19	63	.232	43
13	Los Angeles Clippers	17	65	.207	45
14	Denver Nuggets	11	71	.134	51

z - clinched division title
y - clinched division title
x - clinched playoff spot

== Player statistics ==
Legend
GP	Games played	GS	Games started	MPG	Minutes per game
FG%	Field-goal percentage	3P%	3-point field-goal percentage	FT%	Free-throw percentage
RPG	Rebounds per game	APG	Assists per game	SPG	Steals per game
BPG	Blocks per game	PPG	Points per game

Player	GP	GS	MPG	FG%	3P%	FT%	RPG	APG	SPG	BPG	PPG
Lamond Murray	79	65	32.6	48.1	35.3	74.8	6.1	1.8	1.5	0.7	15.4
Isaac Austin	26	25	34.4	45.4	0.0	65.2	8.7	3.4	0.7	0.8	15.2
Rodney Rogers	76	70	32.9	45.6	34.0	68.6	5.6	2.7	1.2	0.5	15.1
Brent Barry	41	36	32.7	42.8	40.0	84.4	3.5	3.2	1.2	0.6	13.7
Maurice Taylor	71	3	21.3	47.6	0.0	70.9	4.2	0.7	0.5	0.6	11.5
Eric Piatkowski	67	35	26.0	45.2	40.9	82.4	3.5	1.3	0.8	0.2	11.3
Darrick Martin	82	63	28.0	37.7	36.5	84.8	2.0	4.0	1.0	0.1	10.3
Lorenzen Wright	69	38	30.0	44.5	0.0	65.9	8.8	0.8	0.8	1.3	9.0
James Robinson	70	13	17.6	38.9	32.9	72.0	1.6	1.9	0.5	0.1	7.7
Loy Vaught	10	6	26.5	42.9	0.0	37.5	6.5	0.7	0.4	0.2	7.5
Charles Smith	23	0	11.3	42.1	31.8	55.6	0.8	0.8	0.4	0.2	4.7
Pooh Richardson	69	17	18.1	37.2	19.3	69.8	1.4	3.3	0.6	0.0	4.2
Keith Closs	58	1	12.8	44.9	0.0	59.7	2.9	0.3	0.2	1.4	4.0
Stojko Vrankovic	65	38	15.3	42.5	0.0	56.9	4.0	0.6	0.2	1.0	3.0
James Collins	23	0	4.5	38.2	45.0	57.1	0.6	0.1	0.3	0.1	2.6

Player statistics citation:

== Transactions ==
The Clippers have been involved in the following transactions during the 1997–98 season.

=== Trades ===
June 25, 1997
To Los Angeles Clippers

- Stojko Vrankovic
To Minnesota Timberwolves

- Stanley Roberts
June 25, 1997
To Los Angeles Clippers

- Draft rights to James Collins
To Philadelphia 76ers

- 1998 2nd-round draft pick
February 19, 1998
To Los Angeles Clippers

- Isaac Austin, Charles C. Smith & 1998 1st-round draft pick
To Miami Heat

- Brent Barry

=== Free agents ===
==== Additions ====
Player	Signed	Former team
Keith Closs	August 8	Los Angeles Lakers
James Robinson	August 16	Minnesota Timberwolves

==== Subtractions ====
Player	Left	New team
Terry Dehere	waived, July 2	Sacramento Kings
Dwayne Schintzius	released, July 2	Boston Celtics
Malik Sealy	renounced, August 8	Detroit Pistons
Bo Outlaw	free agency, September 5	Orlando Magic
Rich Manning	waived, October 28	Oyak Renault (TBL)

Player transactions citation:

== See also ==
- 1997-98 NBA season
