= Lorenzen Wright =

American basketball player (1975–2010)

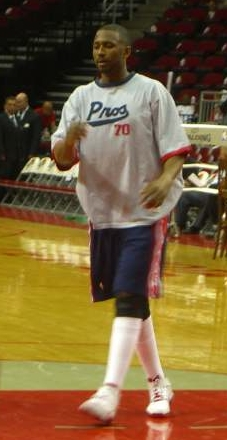
- Wright in 2005

Personal information
- Born: November 4, 1975 Oxford, Mississippi, U.S.
- Died: July 19, 2010 (aged 34) Memphis, Tennessee, U.S.
- Listed height: 6 ft 11 in (2.11 m)
- Listed weight: 255 lb (116 kg)

Career information
- High school: Lafayette (Oxford, Mississippi); Booker T. Washington (Memphis, Tennessee)
- College: Memphis (1994–1996)
- NBA draft: 1996: 1st round, 7th overall pick
- Drafted by: Los Angeles Clippers
- Playing career: 1996–2009
- Position: Center
- Number: 55, 42

Career history
- 1996–1999: Los Angeles Clippers
- 1999–2001: Atlanta Hawks
- 2001–2006: Memphis Grizzlies
- 2006–2008: Atlanta Hawks
- 2008: Sacramento Kings
- 2008–2009: Cleveland Cavaliers

Career highlights
- Consensus second-team All-American (1996); First-team All-Conference USA (1996); First-team All-Great Midwest (1995); Great Midwest Newcomer of the Year (1995); McDonald's All-American (1994); Second-team Parade All-American (1994)

Career NBA statistics
- Points: 6,191 (8.0 ppg)
- Rebounds: 4,943 (6.4 rpg)
- Assists: 622 (0.8 apg)
- Stats at NBA.com
- Stats at Basketball Reference
Medals
Men's basketball
Representing United States
Summer Universiade
Gold medal – first place	1995 Fukuoka	Team competition

Lorenzen Vern-Gagne Wright (November 4, 1975 – July 19, 2010) was an American professional basketball player for thirteen seasons in the National Basketball Association (NBA). He was drafted seventh overall in the 1996 NBA draft by the Los Angeles Clippers and also played for the Atlanta Hawks, Memphis Grizzlies, Sacramento Kings and Cleveland Cavaliers.

Wright went missing on July 18, 2010, and was found shot to death ten days later. In December 2017, his ex-wife Sherra Wright-Robinson was charged with facilitating his murder; a year and a half later, she pleaded guilty. Her friend, Billy Ray Turner, was convicted of first-degree murder, conspiracy to commit first-degree murder, and attempted first-degree murder in March 2022, receiving a sentence of life imprisonment. Wright's status as an NBA player and local celebrity in Memphis led to the prosecution of his murder being highly publicized.

== Early life and college ==
Raised in Oxford, Mississippi, Wright played for Lafayette High School in Mississippi before moving to Memphis, where he spent his senior year playing for Booker T. Washington High School. He played all levels of basketball in Memphis – high school, collegiate, and professional. His father, Herb, was a professional basketball player who competed in Finland, and once had a tryout with the Utah Jazz. When Wright was seven years old, Herb was working for the Memphis Police Department when he was paralyzed by a gunshot to the back.

Wright was recognized as a Third Team All-American by the Associated Press as a sophomore at the University of Memphis. Wright was a member of Kappa Alpha Psi.

== Professional career ==
Wright was selected seventh overall by the Los Angeles Clippers in the 1996 NBA draft out of the University of Memphis. On April 26, 1997, as a rookie, Wright scored what would be a postseason career-high 17 points in a Game 2 loss against the Utah Jazz. The Clippers would go on to lose the series. The following season, on December 26, 1997, Wright scored a season-high 32 points and grabbed 15 rebounds in an overtime loss to the Los Angeles Lakers. Wright moved on to the Atlanta Hawks in 1999, and averaged a career high 12.4 points per game with them during the 2000-01 NBA season. He was traded to the Memphis Grizzlies on June 27, 2001. On January 6, 2003, Wright scored 20 points and grabbed 14 rebounds in a 106–102 win over the New Orleans Hornets. Wright returned to the Hawks in 2006.

On February 16, 2008, he was involved in a multiplayer trade, going from Atlanta to Sacramento for Mike Bibby.

He held career averages of 8.0 points and 6.4 rebounds per game, playing in 778 (793 including playoffs) NBA games over 13 seasons.

== Personal life ==
Lorenzen began dating Sherra Robinson when he was in high school and she was managing a designer clothing store. They married on June 6, 1998. They had seven children: Lorenzen Wright Jr. (born 1995), Loren (born 1997), twins Lamar and Shamar (born 2000), Sierra (born 2002), Sofia (born 2007), and Lawson.

His daughter, Sierra, died of Sudden Infant Death Syndrome on March 1, 2003. Wright and Memphis Grizzlies players and staff founded the Sierra Simone Wright Scholarship Fund after her death.

Lorenzen and Sherra separated in February 2010, with Sherra filing for divorce.

In 2000, Wright and three native-Memphis NBA players, Todd Day, Penny Hardaway and Elliot Perry, provided financial assistance to Travis Butler, a Memphis orphan whose tragic story garnered national attention.

== Disappearance and death ==
On July 18, 2010, Wright left his ex-wife's home in Collierville, Tennessee. This was the last time he was seen alive. His family filed a missing-persons report on July 22, 2010. Wright's body was found six days later in a wooded area on Callis-Cutoff Road, just west of Hacks Cross Road.

In the early-morning hours of July 19, 2010, at 12:18 a.m., a 911 call from Wright's cell phone was received by the 911 dispatch center in Germantown, Tennessee. The caller was speaking with the dispatcher when 11 gunshots rang out. The dispatcher did not report the call to her supervisor until July 28, 10 days after Lorenzen was last seen. Why it took that long remains a question, but this hindered the police investigation and resulted in a payout to Wright's family. The case was investigated as a homicide. Wright's body is buried in Calvary Cemetery in Memphis, Tennessee. In 2011, a reward for information related to the killing stood at $21,000; the state of Tennessee contributed $10,000, the city of Memphis and the Memphis Grizzlies each promised $5,000, and Crime Stoppers promised $1,000.

On November 9, 2017, the gun believed to have been used to murder Wright was found in a lake in Walnut, Mississippi. On December 5, 2017, Billy R. Turner, a landscaper and church deacon at Mt. Olive No. 1 Missionary Baptist Church in Collierville, was indicted on first-degree murder charges and held on $1 million bond.

On December 15, 2017, Wright's ex-wife Sherra Wright-Robinson was arrested in Riverside, California, in connection with the murder. Wright-Robinson was a former member of Turner's church. The seven-year investigation into his death was one of the Memphis Police Department's more high-profile unsolved cases. Wright's mother, Deborah Marion, told The Commercial Appeal that a police official told her Wright-Robinson would be charged with first-degree murder, the same charge Turner faced. Marion said she believes her former daughter-in-law was motivated by money, specifically a life insurance policy for $1 million held by Lorenzen Wright.

In 2014, Wright-Robinson agreed to a confidential settlement of a dispute in circuit court over how she spent the $1 million of insurance money meant to benefit their six children.

On July 25, 2019, Wright-Robinson pleaded guilty to facilitation of first-degree murder in the shooting death of Lorenzen Wright and was sentenced to 30 years in prison.

== See also ==
- Lists of solved missing person cases

== NBA career statistics ==
Legend
GP	Games played	GS	Games started	MPG	Minutes per game
FG%	Field goal percentage	3P%	3-point field goal percentage	FT%	Free throw percentage
RPG	Rebounds per game	APG	Assists per game	SPG	Steals per game
BPG	Blocks per game	PPG	Points per game	**Bold**	Career high

=== Regular season ===
Year	Team	GP	GS	MPG	FG%	3P%	FT%	RPG	APG	SPG	BPG	PPG
1996–97	L.A. Clippers	77	51	25.1	.481	.250	.587	6.1	.6	.6	.8	7.3
1997–98	L.A. Clippers	69	38	**30.0**	.445	.000	.659	8.8	.8	**.8**	**1.3**	9.0
1998–99	L.A. Clippers	48	15	23.6	.458	.000	.692	7.5	.7	.5	.8	6.6
1999–2000	Atlanta	75	0	16.1	**.499**	**.333**	.644	4.1	.3	.4	.5	6.0
2000–01	Atlanta	71	46	28.0	.448	.000	.718	7.5	**1.2**	.6	.9	**12.4**
2001–02	Memphis	43	33	29.1	.459	.000	.569	**9.4**	1.0	.7	.5	12.0
2002–03	Memphis	70	49	28.3	.454	.000	.659	7.5	1.1	.7	.8	11.4
2003–04	Memphis	65	46	25.8	.439	.000	**.733**	6.8	1.1	.7	.9	9.4
2004–05	Memphis	**80**	**77**	28.6	.469	.000	.662	7.7	1.1	.7	.9	9.6
2005–06	Memphis	78	58	21.7	.478	.000	.564	5.1	.6	.7	.6	5.8
2006–07	Atlanta	67	31	15.4	.448	.000	.281	3.2	.6	.4	.4	2.6
2007–08	Atlanta	13	1	11.4	.294	.000	.500	2.8	.2	.2	.2	1.0
2007–08	Sacramento	5	0	2.6	.250	.000	.000	.2	.2	.0	.0	.4
2008–09	Cleveland	17	2	7.4	.370	.000	.375	1.5	.2	.2	.3	1.4
Career		778	447	23.8	.459	.069	.645	6.4	.8	.6	.7	8.0

=== Playoffs ===
Year	Team	GP	GS	MPG	FG%	3P%	FT%	RPG	APG	SPG	BPG	PPG
1997	L.A. Clippers	3	3	**30.7**	.406	.000	**1.000**	**7.3**	.7	**1.0**	.7	**10.3**
2004	Memphis	**4**	**4**	25.0	.435	.000	.333	4.3	.5	**1.0**	.5	5.5
2005	Memphis	**4**	**4**	21.3	.571	.000	.500	5.0	**2.3**	.3	.3	8.3
2006	Memphis	**4**	0	21.5	**.611**	.000	.700	5.0	.8	.0	**1.0**	7.3
Career		15	11	24.2	.495	.000	.652	5.3	1.1	.5	.6	7.7
