= 1997–98 Portland Trail Blazers season =

NBA professional basketball team season

- Head coach: Mike Dunleavy
- Arena: Rose Garden Arena

Results
- Record: 46–36 (.561)
- Place: Division: 4th (Pacific); Conference: 6th (Western)
- Playoff finish: First round (lost to Lakers 1–3)
- Stats at Basketball Reference

Local media
- Television: KGW; Fox Sports Northwest
- Radio: KEX

The 1997–98 Portland Trail Blazers season was the 28th season for the Portland Trail Blazers in the National Basketball Association.

== Season summary ==
=== Off-season ===
The Trail Blazers had the 18th overall pick in the 1997 NBA draft, and selected Australian center Chris Anstey, but soon traded him to the Dallas Mavericks in exchange for rookie center, and first-round draft pick Kelvin Cato out of Iowa State University; the team also selected shooting guard Alvin Williams out of Villanova University with the 48th overall pick. During the off-season, the Trail Blazers signed free agents Brian Grant, and Vincent Askew, and hired former Milwaukee Bucks General Manager, and head coach Mike Dunleavy as their new coach.

=== Regular season ===
Under Dunleavy and with the addition of Brian Grant, the Trail Blazers got off to a 13–6 start to the regular season, which included a five-game winning streak in early November. The team continued to play above .500 in winning percentage as the season progressed, later on holding a 26–20 record at the All-Star break. At mid-season, the Trail Blazers traded Kenny Anderson, Gary Trent and Alvin Williams to the Toronto Raptors in exchange for Damon Stoudamire, Walt Williams and Carlos Rogers; however, Anderson refused to play for the Raptors, who soon traded him to the Boston Celtics. Before the trade, Anderson averaged 12.6 points, 5.4 assists and 1.4 steals per game in 45 games; in 41 games, Trent provided with 11.5 points and 5.7 rebounds per game, and Alvin Williams contributed 6.9 points per game. The Trail Blazers later on signed free agent Gary Grant in March, while Askew was released to free agency after 30 games. The Trail Blazers finished in fourth place in the Pacific Division with a 46–36 record, and earned the sixth seed in the Western Conference; the team qualified for the NBA playoffs for the 16th consecutive year, and also for the 21st time in 22 years.

Isaiah Rider averaged 19.7 points per game and led the Trail Blazers with 135 three-point field goals, while Arvydas Sabonis averaged 16.0 points and 10.0 rebounds per game, and Rasheed Wallace provided the team with 14.6 points and 6.2 rebounds per game. In addition, Stoudamire contributed 12.4 points, 8.2 assists and 1.5 steals per game in 22 games after the trade, while Brian Grant provided with 12.1 points and 9.1 rebounds per game, but only played 61 games due to a leg injury. Off the bench, Walt Williams contributed 8.4 points per game in 31 games, while Stacey Augmon contributed 5.7 points per game, Gary Grant averaged 4.8 points and 3.8 assists per game in 22 games, second-year forward Jermaine O'Neal averaged 4.5 points and 3.4 rebounds per game, and Cato provided with 3.8 points, 3.4 rebounds and 1.3 blocks per game.

During the NBA All-Star weekend at Madison Square Garden in New York City, New York, and before the mid-season trade, Cato and Alvin Williams were both selected for the NBA Rookie Game, as members of the Western Conference Rookie team. Despite a stellar season, Rider was not selected for the 1998 NBA All-Star Game. The Trail Blazers finished third in the NBA in home-game attendance, with an attendance of 846,559 at the Rose Garden Arena during the regular season.

=== NBA playoffs ===
In the Western Conference First Round of the 1998 NBA playoffs, and for the second consecutive year, the Trail Blazers faced off against the 3rd–seeded Los Angeles Lakers, who were led by the All-Star quartet of Shaquille O'Neal, Eddie Jones, second-year star Kobe Bryant, and Nick Van Exel. The result was identical to that of the previous year's playoffs; the Trail Blazers lost the first two games to the Lakers on the road at the Great Western Forum, before winning Game 3 at home, 99–94 at the Rose Garden Arena, and then losing Game 4 to the Lakers at home, 110–99, thus losing the series in four games. It was also the sixth consecutive year that the Trail Blazers lost in the opening round of the NBA playoffs.

=== Notable highlights ===
One notable game of the regular season occurred on November 14, 1997, in which the Trail Blazers lost to the Phoenix Suns at home in quadruple-overtime, 140–139 at the Rose Garden Arena. Three players posted double-doubles; Rider finished with 35 points and 11 rebounds, while Grant contributed 34 points and 17 rebounds, and Sabonis added 31 points and 10 rebounds.

The Trail Blazers also set an ignominious record during a road game against the Indiana Pacers at the Market Square Arena on February 27, 1998, which ended with an embarrassing loss by a score of 124–59; it was the first and only time in NBA history in which a team has had their score doubled.

== NBA draft ==
Round	Pick	Player	Position	Nationality	School/Club team
1	18	Chris Anstey	C	Australia	
2	48	Alvin Williams	SG	United States	Villanova

== Roster ==
1997–98 Portland Trail Blazers roster
Players

Pos.	No.	Player	Height	Weight	DOB	From
G/F	2	Stacey Augmon	6 ft 8 in (2.03 m)	205 lb (93 kg)	1968–08–01	UNLV
G	9	Rick Brunson	6 ft 4 in (1.93 m)	190 lb (86 kg)	1972–06–14	Temple
C	31	Kelvin Cato	6 ft 11 in (2.11 m)	255 lb (116 kg)	1974–08–26	Iowa State
G	12	John Crotty (injured)	6 ft 1 in (1.85 m)	185 lb (84 kg)	1969–07–15	Virginia
F	44	Brian Grant	6 ft 9 in (2.06 m)	254 lb (115 kg)	1972–03–05	Xavier
G	23	Gary Grant	6 ft 3 in (1.91 m)	185 lb (84 kg)	1965–04–21	Michigan
C	53	Alton Lister	7 ft 0 in (2.13 m)	240 lb (109 kg)	1958–10–01	Arizona State
F/C	5	Jermaine O'Neal	6 ft 11 in (2.11 m)	226 lb (103 kg)	1978–10–13	Eau Claire HS (SC)
G	34	Isaiah Rider	6 ft 5 in (1.96 m)	215 lb (98 kg)	1971–03–12	UNLV
C	4	Carlos Rogers (injured)	6 ft 11 in (2.11 m)	220 lb (100 kg)	1971–02–06	Tennessee State
C	11	Arvydas Sabonis	7 ft 3 in (2.21 m)	279 lb (127 kg)	1964–12–19	Lithuania
G	3	Damon Stoudamire	5 ft 10 in (1.78 m)	171 lb (78 kg)	1973–09–03	Arizona
F	30	Rasheed Wallace	6 ft 10 in (2.08 m)	225 lb (102 kg)	1974–09–17	North Carolina
F	42	Walt Williams	6 ft 8 in (2.03 m)	219 lb (99 kg)	1970–04–16	Maryland

Coaches
Head coach
- Mike Dunleavy
Assistant(s)
- Tony Brown
- Jim Eyen
- Elston Turner

Legend
- (DP) Unsigned draft pick
- (FA) Free agent
- (S) Suspended
- Injured

Roster

=== Roster notes ===
- Small forward Vincent Askew was waived on March 24, 1998.
- Small forward Dontonio Wingfield was waived on March 5, 1998.

== Regular season ==
=== Season standings ===
Pacific Division	W	L	PCT	GB	Home	Road	Div
y-Seattle SuperSonics	61	21	.744	–	35–6	26–15	19–5
x-Los Angeles Lakers	61	21	.744	–	33–8	28–13	16–8
x-Phoenix Suns	56	26	.683	5	30–11	26–15	17–7
x-Portland Trail Blazers	46	36	.561	15	26–15	20–21	14–10
Sacramento Kings	27	55	.329	34	21–20	6–35	6–18
Golden State Warriors	19	63	.232	42	12–29	7–34	6–18
Los Angeles Clippers	17	65	.207	44	11–30	6–35	6–18

#	Western Conference				
#	Team	W	L	PCT	GB
1	z-Utah Jazz	62	20	.756	–
2	y-Seattle SuperSonics	61	21	.744	1
3	x-Los Angeles Lakers	61	21	.744	1
4	x-Phoenix Suns	56	26	.683	6
5	x-San Antonio Spurs	56	26	.683	6
6	x-Portland Trail Blazers	46	36	.561	16
7	x-Minnesota Timberwolves	45	37	.549	17
8	x-Houston Rockets	41	41	.500	21
9	Sacramento Kings	27	55	.329	35
10	Dallas Mavericks	20	62	.244	42
11	Vancouver Grizzlies	19	63	.232	43
12	Golden State Warriors	19	63	.232	43
13	Los Angeles Clippers	17	65	.207	45
14	Denver Nuggets	11	71	.134	51

z - clinched division title
y - clinched division title
x - clinched playoff spot

== Playoffs ==
1998 playoff game log
First round: 1–3 (home: 1–1; road: 0–2)

Game	Date	Team	Score	High points	High rebounds	High assists	Location Attendance	Series
1	April 24	@ L.A. Lakers	L 102–104	Isaiah Rider (25)	Brian Grant (12)	Damon Stoudamire (10)	Great Western Forum; 17,505	0–1
2	April 26	@ L.A. Lakers	L 99–108	Isaiah Rider (24)	three players tied (7)	Damon Stoudamire (14)	Great Western Forum; 17,505	0–2
3	April 28	L.A. Lakers	W 99–94	Rider, Stoudamire (18)	Brian Grant (12)	Damon Stoudamire (6)	Rose Garden; 21,558	1–2
4	April 30	L.A. Lakers	L 99–110	Damon Stoudamire (24)	Brian Grant (12)	Damon Stoudamire (8)	Rose Garden; 21,558	1–3

1998 schedule

== Player statistics ==
Legend
GP	Games played	GS	Games started	MPG	Minutes per game
FG%	Field-goal percentage	3P%	3-point field-goal percentage	FT%	Free-throw percentage
RPG	Rebounds per game	APG	Assists per game	SPG	Steals per game
BPG	Blocks per game	PPG	Points per game

=== Regular season ===
Player	GP	GS	MPG	FG%	3P%	FT%	RPG	APG	SPG	BPG	PPG
Rasheed Wallace	77	77	37.6	.533	.205	.662	6.2	2.5	1.0	1.1	14.6
Isaiah Rider	74	66	37.6	.423	.321	.828	4.7	3.1	.7	.3	19.7
Kelvin Cato	74	8	13.6	.428	.000	.688	3.4	.3	.4	1.3	3.8
Arvydas Sabonis	73	73	32.0	.493	.261	.798	10.0	3.0	.9	1.1	16.0
Stacey Augmon	71	23	20.4	.414	.143	.603	3.3	1.2	.8	.5	5.7
Brian Grant	61	49	31.5	.508	.000	.750	9.1	1.4	.7	.7	12.1
Jermaine O'Neal	60	9	13.5	.485	.000	.506	3.4	.3	.3	1.0	4.5
Kenny Anderson^{†}	45	40	32.7	.387	.353	.772	3.0	5.4	1.4	.0	12.6
Gary Trent^{†}	41	13	24.5	.493	.444	.693	5.7	1.4	.7	.5	11.5
Alvin Williams^{†}	41	10	21.1	.458	.292	.734	1.5	2.0	.7	.0	6.9
Rick Brunson	38	10	16.4	.348	.361	.677	1.5	2.6	.7	.1	4.3
Walt Williams^{†}	31	1	19.2	.378	.344	.908	2.6	1.7	.6	.4	8.4
Vincent Askew	30	5	14.8	.352	.000	.718	2.3	1.3	.6	.2	2.2
John Crotty	26	2	14.6	.322	.300	.941	1.2	2.4	.4	.0	3.7
Damon Stoudamire^{†}	22	22	36.6	.364	.263	.787	3.7	8.2	1.5	.1	12.4
Gary Grant	22	2	16.3	.462	.368	.857	2.2	3.8	.8	.1	4.8
Alton Lister	7	0	6.3	.375			1.6	.1	.1	.1	.9
Carlos Rogers^{†}	3	0	8.3	.500	.000		.7	.7	.3	.0	1.3
Dontonio Wingfield	3	0	3.0	.000		.500	1.3	.0	.0	.0	.3
Sean Higgins	2	0	6.0	.000	.000		.0	.0	1.0	.0	.0

=== Playoffs ===
Player	GP	GS	MPG	FG%	3P%	FT%	RPG	APG	SPG	BPG	PPG
Isaiah Rider	4	4	41.5	.418	.091	.769	5.0	4.3	1.3	.0	19.3
Damon Stoudamire	4	4	41.5	.397	.364	1.000	4.3	9.5	1.3	.3	17.8
Rasheed Wallace	4	4	39.3	.489	.800	.500	4.8	2.8	.5	.5	14.5
Brian Grant	4	4	33.8	.528		.833	10.8	1.5	1.0	.8	13.3
Arvydas Sabonis	4	4	26.8	.450	.500	.857	7.8	1.5	1.8	.8	12.3
Walt Williams	4	0	25.5	.548	.533	.786	3.5	2.3	.3	.0	13.3
Kelvin Cato	4	0	14.5	.529	.000	.727	3.0	.3	.3	1.8	6.5
Stacey Augmon	4	0	7.0	.500		.500	.8	.3	.5	.3	1.3
Gary Grant	4	0	6.8	.286	.250		1.3	1.8	.3	.3	1.3
Alton Lister	2	0	5.5	.333			1.0	.0	.0	.5	1.0
Jermaine O'Neal	1	0	3.0	.000	.000		1.0	.0	.0	2.0	.0

- ^{†} Denotes player spent time with another team in the season. Stats reflect time with the Trail Blazers only.

Player statistics citation:
