= Kelvin Cato =

American basketball player (born 1974)

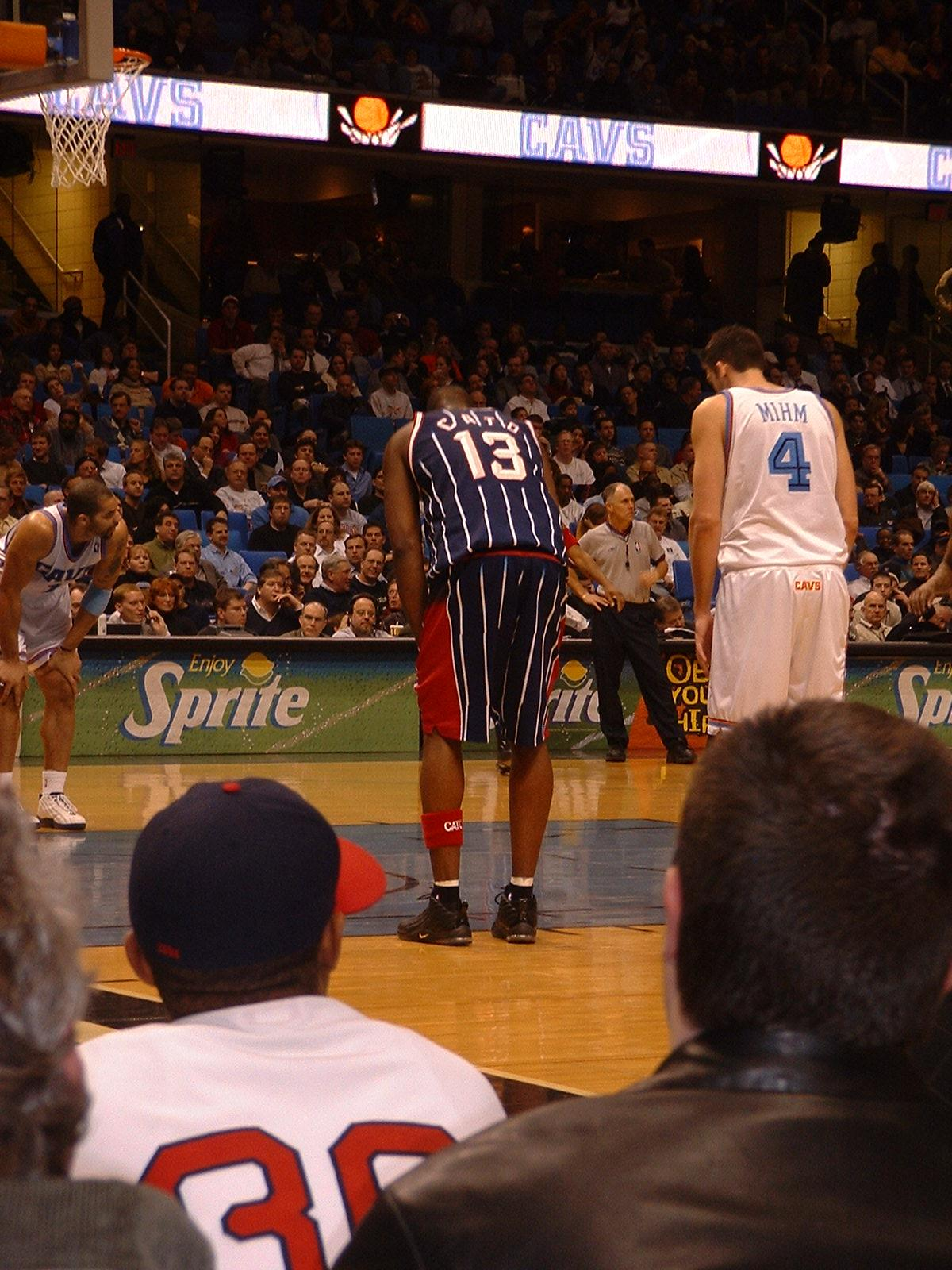
- Cato, center, as a member of the Houston Rockets during the 2002-03 NBA season.

Personal information
- Born: August 26, 1974 (age 52) Atlanta, Georgia, U.S.
- Listed height: 6 ft 11 in (2.11 m)
- Listed weight: 275 lb (125 kg)

Career information
- High school: Lithonia (Lithonia, Georgia)
- College: South Alabama (1992–1993); Iowa State (1995–1997)
- NBA draft: 1997: 1st round, 15th overall pick
- Drafted by: Dallas Mavericks
- Playing career: 1997–2007
- Position: Center
- Number: 31, 13, 26

Career history
- 1997–1999: Portland Trail Blazers
- 1999–2004: Houston Rockets
- 2004–2006: Orlando Magic
- 2006: Detroit Pistons
- 2006–2007: New York Knicks

Career highlights
- Third-team All-Big 12 (1997)

Career NBA statistics
- Points: 2,960 (5.5 ppg)
- Rebounds: 2,874 (5.3 rpg)
- Blocks: 685 (1.3 bpg)
- Stats at NBA.com
- Stats at Basketball Reference

Kelvin Tavares Cato (born August 26, 1974) is an American former professional basketball player. A 6'11" center from the University of South Alabama and Iowa State University, Cato played in the National Basketball Association (NBA) as a member of the Portland Trail Blazers, Houston Rockets, Orlando Magic, Detroit Pistons, and New York Knicks.

== College career ==
Cato was not a well-known player in his freshman year, averaging six points and six rebounds at the University of South Alabama in 1992–93. In 1993, he struck up a relationship with then University of New Orleans coach Tim Floyd, who saw potential in Cato as a rebounder and shot blocker. In 1994, Floyd took over as head coach at Iowa State University and convinced Cato to transfer to Iowa State after disagreements with South Alabama head coach Ronnie Arrow. Cato averaged 11 points, eight rebounds and four blocks per game for an Iowa State team that reached the Sweet Sixteen of the 1997 NCAA basketball tournament.

== NBA career ==
Drafted 15th overall in the 1997 NBA draft by the Dallas Mavericks, Cato's draft rights were immediately traded to the Portland Trail Blazers for the draft rights to Chris Anstey and $800,000 in cash considerations. Cato averaged 3.8 and 3.5 points per game in his first and second seasons respectively in Portland, before being bundled in a six-for-one deal with the Houston Rockets that sent Scottie Pippen to the Trail Blazers.

He spent five years in Houston, averaging a career-high 8.7 points per game in 1999–2000, and started all but two of the games he played in both the 2001–02 and 2003–04 seasons. On October 28, 1999, Cato signed a six-year, $42,000,000 contract extension that increased in controversy as his playing statistics cooled. With Yao Ming as the Rockets' new starting center, the Rockets traded Cato in a seven-player deal that sent Steve Francis, Cuttino Mobley, and Cato to the Orlando Magic for Tracy McGrady, Juwan Howard, Tyronn Lue, and Reece Gaines. While he started 50 games in the 2004–05 season for the Magic, his playing minutes went down significantly the following season as he battled shoulder injuries.

On February 15, 2006, Cato, along with the Magic's first-round pick in the 2007 NBA draft, was traded to the Detroit Pistons for center Darko Miličić and point guard Carlos Arroyo. Cato finished out the season with the Pistons. He signed with the New York Knicks for the 2006–07 season.

== Career statistics ==
Legend
GP	Games played	GS	Games started	MPG	Minutes per game
FG%	Field goal percentage	3P%	3-point field goal percentage	FT%	Free throw percentage
RPG	Rebounds per game	APG	Assists per game	SPG	Steals per game
BPG	Blocks per game	PPG	Points per game	**Bold**	Career high

=== NBA ===
==== Regular season ====
Year	Team	GP	GS	MPG	FG%	3P%	FT%	RPG	APG	SPG	BPG	PPG
1997–98	Portland	74	8	13.6	.428	.000	.688	3.4	.3	.4	1.3	3.8
1998–99	Portland	43	0	12.7	.450	**1.000**	.507	3.5	.4	.5	1.3	3.5
1999–00	Houston	65	32	24.3	.537	.000	.649	6.0	.4	.5	**1.9**	**8.7**
2000–01	Houston	35	13	17.8	.577	–	.649	4.0	.3	.4	.9	4.7
2001–02	Houston	**75**	**73**	**25.6**	**.583**	.000	.582	**7.0**	.4	.5	1.3	6.6
2002–03	Houston	73	5	17.1	.520	.000	.532	5.9	.3	.5	1.2	4.5
2003–04	Houston	69	67	25.3	.447	–	.676	6.8	**1.0**	.8	1.4	6.1
2004–05	Orlando	62	50	24.6	.539	–	**.783**	6.7	.6	**.9**	1.3	7.0
2005–06	Orlando	23	0	13.0	.431	–	.743	2.7	.1	.3	.4	3.8
2005–06	Detroit	4	0	8.5	.417	–	–	1.8	.5	.0	.5	2.5
2006–07	New York	18	0	5.3	.318	–	.667	1.7	.0	.2	.6	1.2
Career		541	248	19.6	.507	.077	.644	5.3	.5	.5	1.3	5.5

==== Playoffs ====
Year	Team	GP	GS	MPG	FG%	3P%	FT%	RPG	APG	SPG	BPG	PPG
1998	Portland	4	0	14.5	.529	.000	**.727**	3.0	.3	.3	**1.8**	**6.5**
1999	Portland	**8**	0	5.4	.111	–	.400	.9	.3	.1	.1	.8
2004	Houston	5	**5**	**29.6**	.591	–	.429	**6.8**	**.4**	**1.0**	.8	5.8
2006	Detroit	4	0	3.8	**.600**	–	–	1.8	.0	.0	.0	1.5
Career		21	5	12.6	.491	.000	.536	2.9	.2	.3	.6	3.2
