= Chris Robinson (basketball) =

American basketball player

Personal information
- Born: April 2, 1974 (age 52) Columbus, Georgia, U.S.
- Listed height: 6 ft 5 in (1.96 m)
- Listed weight: 200 lb (91 kg)

Career information
- High school: Southwest Magnet (Macon, Georgia)
- College: Western Kentucky (1992–1996)
- NBA draft: 1996: 2nd round, 51st overall pick
- Drafted by: Vancouver Grizzlies
- Playing career: 1996–2005
- Position: Shooting guard / small forward
- Number: 5

Career history
- 1996–1998: Vancouver Grizzlies
- 1998: Sacramento Kings
- 1999: Sioux Falls Skyforce
- 1999–2000: La Crosse Bobcats
- 2001: Gaiteros del Zulia
- 2001: North Charleston Lowgators
- 2002: Huntsville Flight
- 2002: SLUC Nancy
- 2002–2003: Verviers-Pepinster
- 2004–2005: Carolina Thunder

Career highlights
- Sun Belt Player of the Year (1995); 3× First-team All-Sun Belt (1994–1996)

Career NBA statistics
- Points: 350 (4.6 ppg)
- Rebounds: 117 (1.5 rpg)
- Assists: 104 (1.4 apg)
- Stats at NBA.com
- Stats at Basketball Reference

Chris Sean Robinson (born April 2, 1974) is an American former professional basketball player who played briefly in the National Basketball Association (NBA). He played college basketball for the Western Kentucky Hilltoppers.

After graduating from Southwest Magnet High School in Macon, Georgia, Robinson attended Western Kentucky University where he averaged 13.8 points per game over four seasons.

He was selected by the Vancouver Grizzlies with the 51st overall pick in the 1996 NBA draft. As a rookie for the Grizzlies, Robinson appeared in 41 games of the 1996–97 NBA season (six as a starter), averaging 4.6 points per game.
