= Howard Eisley =

American basketball player and coach (born 1972)

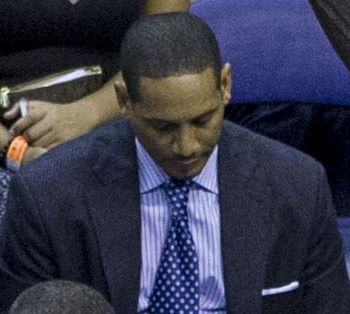
- Eisley in 2013

Personal information
- Born: December 4, 1972 (age 53) Detroit, Michigan, U.S.
- Listed height: 6 ft 2 in (1.88 m)
- Listed weight: 185 lb (84 kg)

Career information
- High school: Southwestern (Detroit, Michigan)
- College: Boston College (1990–1994)
- NBA draft: 1994: 2nd round, 30th overall pick
- Drafted by: Minnesota Timberwolves
- Playing career: 1994–2006
- Position: Point guard / shooting guard
- Number: 10, 1, 9, 4, 12, 6
- Coaching career: 2010–present

Career history

Playing
- 1994–1995: Minnesota Timberwolves
- 1995: San Antonio Spurs
- 1995: Rockford Lightning
- 1995–2000: Utah Jazz
- 2000–2001: Dallas Mavericks
- 2001–2004: New York Knicks
- 2004: Phoenix Suns
- 2004–2005: Utah Jazz
- 2005–2006: Los Angeles Clippers
- 2006: Denver Nuggets

Coaching
- 2010–2014: Los Angeles Clippers (assistant)
- 2014–2016: Washington Wizards (assistant)
- 2016–2019: New York Knicks (assistant)
- 2019–2024: Michigan (assistant)

Career highlights
- Second-team All-Big East (1993)

Career NBA statistics
- Points: 5,116 (6.5 ppg)
- Rebounds: 1,324 (1.7 rpg)
- Assists: 2,748 (3.5 apg)
- Stats at NBA.com
- Stats at Basketball Reference

Howard Jonathan Eisley (born December 4, 1972) is an American former professional basketball player and current coach. Born in Detroit, Eisley played college basketball for the Boston College Eagles and was drafted in 1994 by the Minnesota Timberwolves. Eisley spent twelve seasons in the National Basketball Association (NBA): six with the Utah Jazz (1995–2000, 2004–2005) and the other six with seven other teams.

== Early life and college ==
Eisley graduated from Southwestern High School in Detroit, where he was teammates with future NBA players Jalen Rose and Voshon Lenard, and played for the Boston College Eagles basketball team for four years before being drafted by the Minnesota Timberwolves in the second round (30th overall) in 1994. He graduated from Boston College with a degree in communications. In his senior season, Eisley led the Eagles to the eastern regional finals or "Elite Eight" round of the 1994 NCAA tournament and earned regional All-Tournament honors.

== NBA career ==
=== Minnesota Timberwolves (1994–1995) ===
Eisley was selected by the Minnesota Timberwolves with the 30th overall pick in the 1994 NBA draft. As a rookie in 1994–95, Eisley started in four games for the Timberwolves out of 34. With an average playing time of 14.6 minutes per game, Eisley averaged 3.3 points and 2.3 assists. On February 13, 1995, Eisley was waived by the Timberwolves.

=== San Antonio Spurs (1995) ===
On February 26, 1995, Eisley signed the first of two 10-day contracts with the San Antonio Spurs. He signed for the rest of the season on March 18, and was released on April 14. In 15 games and 56 minutes with the Spurs, Eisley recorded 7 points and 18 assists.

=== Utah Jazz (1995–2000) ===
Eisley began the next season with the Rockford Lightning of the Continental Basketball Association (CBA) before signing with the Utah Jazz, who sought a point guard to back up John Stockton and to replace the injured Jamie Watson. Previously, Eisley was the final player cut from Jazz training camp. By December 1995, Eisley had the top free throw percentage (17 for 17) in the CBA. In seven games with the Lightning, Eisley improved his performance: in 24 minutes per game, he averaged 12.4 points and 3.3 assists. Jazz coach Jerry Sloan commented that Eisley was "a focused young man" and: "So many people play with their athletic ability alone and forget to play with the other people on the court. He's adjusted as quickly to what we're doing as anybody we've had." Eisley was known for his quiet manner.

In the first half of Game 6 of the 1998 NBA Finals, Eisley made a 3-point shot that replays clearly showed was released before the shot clock expired. Referee Dick Bavetta mistakenly disallowed the shot. (This game took place four years before the NBA instituted instant replay to review calls.) The Chicago Bulls would beat the Utah Jazz in that game 87–86 and win the championship series four games to two.

=== Dallas Mavericks (2000–2001) ===
Eisley was traded to the Dallas Mavericks during the 2000 season. He would play 82 games for the Mavericks during the 2000–01 season, averaging 9.0 points, 2.4 rebounds, and 3.6 assists per game. That season he would also appear in nine games for the Mavericks in the 2001 NBA playoffs where Dallas defeated the Utah Jazz in the first round 3-2 and lost to the San Antonio Spurs in the western conference semifinals 4–1.

=== New York Knicks (2001–2004) ===
Eisley was traded to the New York Knicks in 2001 in a three-team trade involving the Houston Rockets, sending Muggsy Bogues to Dallas. He spent three seasons with the Knicks from 2001 until 2003, including the 2002–03 season when he averaged a career-high 9.1 points per game.

=== Phoenix Suns (2004) ===
Eisley was traded to the Phoenix Suns in 2004, alongside Maciej Lampe, Antonio McDyess, Charlie Ward, the rights to Miloš Vujanić, and draft considerations, in exchange for Stephon Marbury, Penny Hardaway and Cezary Trybański. He would only play 34 games for the Suns in the 2003–04 season before being waived by the Suns on October 29, 2004.

=== Utah Jazz (2004–2005) ===
On November 3, 2004, the first day of the regular season for the Utah Jazz, Eisley signed a $1.1 million, one-year contract with the team, for which he played five seasons from 1995 to 2000. He scored four points and made three assists, and the Jazz beat the Los Angeles Lakers 104–78. In 74 games, Eisley averaged 19.3 minutes, 5.6 points, 1.2 rebounds, and 3.4 assists. Among his milestones in his comeback season with the Jazz included his 700th career game (December 12, 2004 against the Portland Trail Blazers), 5,000th career point (April 15, 2005 against the Minnesota Timberwolves), and a career-high eight defensive rebounds (February 1, 2005 against the Charlotte Bobcats). In 19 games, Eisley led the Jazz in assists.

=== Los Angeles Clippers (2005–2006) ===
On November 17, 2005, Eisley signed as a free agent with the Clippers. In 13 games with the Clippers, Eisley averaged 0.7 points, 1.1 rebounds, and 1.9 assists. The Clippers, having experimented with a three-guard lineup as Corey Maggette was out due to injury, released Eisley on January 3, 2006.

=== Denver Nuggets (2006) ===
Following two 10-day contracts, the Nuggets kept Eisley for the rest of the season from March 23, 2006. With the Nuggets, Eisley played in 19 games and averaged 4.8 points, 1.0 rebounds, and 2.3 assists. On July 20, 2006, the Nuggets traded Eisley to the Chicago Bulls, but the Bulls later waived him.

== Coaching career ==
In 2010, Eisley became a player development assistant for the Los Angeles Clippers.

Eisley was hired as an assistant coach for the Washington Wizards on September 4, 2014. Following a three-year stint as an assistant with the New York Knicks, Eisley joined Juwan Howard's staff at the University of Michigan as an assistant coach.

On October 13, 2025, the Dallas Mavericks hired Eisley to serve as a scout.

== NBA career statistics ==
Legend
GP	Games played	GS	Games started	MPG	Minutes per game
FG%	Field goal percentage	3P%	3-point field goal percentage	FT%	Free throw percentage
RPG	Rebounds per game	APG	Assists per game	SPG	Steals per game
BPG	Blocks per game	PPG	Points per game	**Bold**	Career high
*	Led the league

=== Regular season ===
Year	Team	GP	GS	MPG	FG%	3P%	FT%	RPG	APG	SPG	BPG	PPG
1994–95	Minnesota	34	4	14.6	.352	.250	.775	1.2	2.3	.5	.1	3.3
1994–95	San Antonio	15	0	3.7	.176	.200	–	.4	1.2	.0	.1	.5
1995–96	Utah	65	0	14.8	.430	.226	.844	1.2	2.2	.4	.0	4.4
1996–97	Utah	**82**	0	13.2	**.451**	.278	.787	1.0	2.4	.5	.1	4.5
1997–98	Utah	**82***	18	21.0	.441	.407	.852	2.0	4.2	.7	**.2**	7.7
1998–99	Utah	50*	0	20.8	.446	**.420**	.838	1.9	3.7	.6	.0	7.4
1999–00	Utah	**82**	5	25.6	.418	.368	.824	2.1	4.2	.7	.1	8.6
2000–01	Dallas	**82**	40	**29.6**	.393	.398	.825	**2.4**	3.6	**1.2**	.1	9.0
2001–02	New York	39	0	15.6	.337	.241	.796	1.3	2.6	.6	.1	4.4
2002–03	New York	**82**	**76**	27.4	.417	.389	.848	2.3	**5.4**	.9	.1	**9.1**
2003–04	New York	33	23	22.1	.396	.329	**.889**	2.0	4.7	.9	.1	6.7
2003–04	Phoenix	34	0	21.4	.345	.308	.830	1.9	3.4	.8	.1	7.1
2004–05	Utah	74	1	19.4	.398	.262	.795	1.2	3.4	.6	.1	5.6
2005–06	L.A. Clippers	13	0	8.6	.235	.250	–	1.1	1.9	.2	.0	.7
2005–06	Denver	19	0	14.9	.349	.316	.833	1.0	2.3	.4	.1	4.8
Career		786	167	20.4	.407	.350	.827	1.7	3.5	.7	.1	6.5

=== Playoffs ===
Year	Team	GP	GS	MPG	FG%	3P%	FT%	RPG	APG	SPG	BPG	PPG
1996	Utah	18	0	11.2	.381	.333	.818	1.2	2.4	.2	.1	2.9
1997	Utah	**20**	0	10.9	**.500**	**.474**	.964	.9	2.0	.2	.0	5.6
1998	Utah	**20**	0	18.3	.368	.296	.923	**2.0**	**4.1**	**.6**	**.3**	5.6
1999	Utah	11	0	**21.9**	.366	.208	.828	1.8	2.9	**.6**	**.3**	**7.4**
2000	Utah	10	0	20.0	.309	**.474**	.889	1.8	1.9	**.6**	.1	5.1
2001	Dallas	9	0	21.6	.358	.385	**1.000**	1.3	1.9	**.6**	.1	5.8
Career		88	0	16.1	.384	.355	.886	1.5	2.6	.4	.1	5.2
