= 1997–98 Seattle SuperSonics season =

NBA professional basketball team season

- Division champions
- Head coach: George Karl
- General manager: Wally Walker
- Arena: KeyArena at Seattle Center

Results
- Record: 61–21 (.744)
- Place: Division: 1st (Pacific); Conference: 2nd (Western)
- Playoff finish: West Semi-finals (lost to Lakers 1–4)
- Stats at Basketball Reference

Local media
- Television: KSTW; Fox Sports Northwest
- Radio: KJR

The 1997–98 Seattle SuperSonics season was the 30th season for the Seattle SuperSonics in the National Basketball Association.

== Season summary ==
=== Off-season ===
During the off-season, the SuperSonics acquired All-Star forward Vin Baker from the Milwaukee Bucks in a three-team trade, re-acquired former SuperSonics All-Star guard Dale Ellis from the Denver Nuggets, and signed free agents Jerome Kersey, and Greg Anthony.

=== Regular season ===
With the addition of Baker and Ellis, the SuperSonics got off to a fast start with a 13–3 record, after posting a seven-game winning streak in November, despite losing Kersey to a stress fracture in his left foot, as he only played just 37 games. The team posted an eight-game winning streak between December and January, winning 29 of their first 35 games of the regular season, and then later on holding the league's best record at 37–10 before the All-Star break. The SuperSonics finished tied in first place in the Pacific Division along with the Los Angeles Lakers with a 61–21 record, and earned the second seed in the Western Conference; the team qualified for the NBA playoffs for the eighth consecutive year.

Baker averaged 19.2 points and 8.0 rebounds per game, and was named to the All-NBA Second Team, while Gary Payton averaged 19.2 points, 8.3 assists and 2.3 steals per game, led the SuperSonics with 134 three-point field goals, and was named to the All-NBA First Team, and to the NBA All-Defensive First Team. In addition, Detlef Schrempf provided the team with 15.8 points, 7.1 rebounds and 4.4 assists per game, while Ellis played a sixth man role off the bench, averaging 11.8 points per game along 127 three-point field goals, while shooting .464 in three-point field goal percentage, and Hersey Hawkins contributed 10.5 points and 1.8 steals per game, along with 125 three-point field goals. Also off the bench, Sam Perkins contributed 7.2 points per game, while Kersey averaged 6.3 points and 3.6 rebounds per game, Anthony contributed 5.2 points and 2.6 assists per game, and starting center Jim McIlvaine provided with 3.2 points, 3.3 rebounds and 1.8 blocks per game.

During the NBA All-Star weekend at Madison Square Garden in New York City, New York, Baker and Payton were both selected for the 1998 NBA All-Star Game, as members of the Western Conference All-Star team, while head coach George Karl was selected to coach the Western Conference for the third time in five years. It was Baker's fourth and final All-Star appearance. Meanwhile, Ellis participated in the NBA Three-Point Shootout for the second consecutive year. Payton finished in third place in Most Valuable Player voting, behind Michael Jordan of the Chicago Bulls, and Karl Malone of the Utah Jazz, while Baker finished in eighth place; Payton also finished in second place in Defensive Player of the Year voting, behind Dikembe Mutombo of the Atlanta Hawks, while Baker finished tied in eighth place in Most Improved Player voting, Ellis finished in third place in Sixth Man of the Year voting, and Karl finished tied in fifth place in Coach of the Year voting.

The SuperSonics finished 13th in the NBA in home-game attendance, with an attendance of 699,952 at the KeyArena at Seattle Center during the regular season.

=== NBA playoffs ===
In the Western Conference First Round of the 1998 NBA playoffs, the SuperSonics faced off against the 7th–seeded Minnesota Timberwolves, a team that featured All-Star forward Kevin Garnett, second-year star Stephon Marbury, and Anthony Peeler. The Timberwolves were without All-Star forward Tom Gugliotta, who was out due to a season-ending ankle injury. The SuperSonics won Game 1 over the Timberwolves at home, 108–83 at the KeyArena at Seattle Center, but then struggled and faced elimination again, losing the next two games, which included a Game 3 road loss at the Target Center, 98–90 as the Timberwolves took a 2–1 series lead. However, the SuperSonics managed to win the next two games, including a Game 5 win over the Timberwolves at the KeyArena at Seattle Center, 97–84 to win in a hard-fought five-game series.

In the Western Conference Semi-finals, the team faced off against the 3rd–seeded Lakers, who were led by the All-Star quartet of Shaquille O'Neal, Eddie Jones, second-year star Kobe Bryant, and Nick Van Exel. Despite both teams finishing with the same regular-season record, the SuperSonics had home-court advantage in the series. The SuperSonics won Game 1 over the Lakers at home, 106–92 at the KeyArena at Seattle Center, but then lost Game 2 at home, 92–68 as the Lakers evened the series; the SuperSonics struggled only shooting .329 in field-goal percentage in Game 2. The SuperSonics lost the next two games on the road at the Great Western Forum, before losing Game 5 to the Lakers at the KeyArena at Seattle Center, 110–95, thus losing the series in five games.

=== Aftermath ===
Following the season, Karl was fired as head coach in late May, and was then hired three months later by the Milwaukee Bucks, while Perkins signed as a free agent with the Indiana Pacers, and long-time SuperSonics defensive guard Nate McMillan retired after only playing just 18 games this season due to knee surgery. Meanwhile, Kersey signed with the San Antonio Spurs, Anthony signed with the Portland Trail Blazers, McIlvaine was traded to the New Jersey Nets, and David Wingate signed with the New York Knicks.

== Draft picks ==
Round	Pick	Player	Position	Nationality	College
1	23	Bobby Jackson	PG/SG	United States	Minnesota
2	41	Ed Elisma	F	United States	Georgia Tech
2	55	Mark Blount	C	United States	Pittsburgh

== Roster ==
1997–98 Seattle SuperSonics roster
Players

Pos.	No.	Player	Height	Weight	DOB	From
PG	2	Greg Anthony	6 ft 0 in (1.83 m)	176 lb (80 kg)	1967–11–15	UNLV
PF	42	Vin Baker	6 ft 11 in (2.11 m)	232 lb (105 kg)	1971–11–23	Hartford
SG	4	James Cotton	6 ft 5 in (1.96 m)	220 lb (100 kg)	1975–12–14	Long Beach State
SF	9	Dale Ellis	6 ft 7 in (2.01 m)	205 lb (93 kg)	1960–08–06	Tennessee
SG	33	Hersey Hawkins	6 ft 3 in (1.91 m)	190 lb (86 kg)	1966–09–29	Bradley
SF	44	Stephen Howard (injured)	6 ft 9 in (2.06 m)	225 lb (102 kg)	1970–07–15	DePaul
SF	7	Jerome Kersey	6 ft 7 in (2.01 m)	215 lb (98 kg)	1962–06–26	Longwood
C	22	Jim McIlvaine	7 ft 1 in (2.16 m)	240 lb (109 kg)	1972–07–30	Marquette
SG	10	Nate McMillan	6 ft 5 in (1.96 m)	195 lb (88 kg)	1964–08–03	NC State
PG	20	Gary Payton	6 ft 4 in (1.93 m)	180 lb (82 kg)	1968–07–23	Oregon State
PF	14	Sam Perkins	6 ft 9 in (2.06 m)	235 lb (107 kg)	1961–06–14	North Carolina
SF	11	Detlef Schrempf	6 ft 10 in (2.08 m)	214 lb (97 kg)	1963–01–21	Washington
C	15	Aaron Williams	6 ft 9 in (2.06 m)	220 lb (100 kg)	1971–10–02	Xavier
SG	25	David Wingate	6 ft 5 in (1.96 m)	185 lb (84 kg)	1963–12–15	Georgetown

Coaches
Head coach
- George Karl
Assistant(s)
- Dwane Casey
- Tim Grgurich
- Terry Stotts
- Bob Weiss

Legend
- (DP) Unsigned draft pick
- (FA) Free agent
- (S) Suspended
- Injured

== Regular season ==
=== Season standings ===
Pacific Division	W	L	PCT	GB	Home	Road	Div
y-Seattle SuperSonics	61	21	.744	–	35–6	26–15	19–5
x-Los Angeles Lakers	61	21	.744	–	33–8	28–13	16–8
x-Phoenix Suns	56	26	.683	5	30–11	26–15	17–7
x-Portland Trail Blazers	46	36	.561	15	26–15	20–21	14–10
Sacramento Kings	27	55	.329	34	21–20	6–35	6–18
Golden State Warriors	19	63	.232	42	12–29	7–34	6–18
Los Angeles Clippers	17	65	.207	44	11–30	6–35	6–18

#	Western Conference				
#	Team	W	L	PCT	GB
1	z-Utah Jazz	62	20	.756	–
2	y-Seattle SuperSonics	61	21	.744	1
3	x-Los Angeles Lakers	61	21	.744	1
4	x-Phoenix Suns	56	26	.683	6
5	x-San Antonio Spurs	56	26	.683	6
6	x-Portland Trail Blazers	46	36	.561	16
7	x-Minnesota Timberwolves	45	37	.549	17
8	x-Houston Rockets	41	41	.500	21
9	Sacramento Kings	27	55	.329	35
10	Dallas Mavericks	20	62	.244	42
11	Vancouver Grizzlies	19	63	.232	43
12	Golden State Warriors	19	63	.232	43
13	Los Angeles Clippers	17	65	.207	45
14	Denver Nuggets	11	71	.134	51

== Playoffs ==
1998 playoff game log
First round: 3–2 (home: 2–1; road: 1–1)

Game	Date	Team	Score	High points	High rebounds	High assists	Location Attendance	Series
1	April 24	Minnesota	W 108–83	Vin Baker (25)	Vin Baker (12)	Gary Payton (7)	KeyArena; 17,072	1–0
2	April 26	Minnesota	L 93–98	Gary Payton (32)	Detlef Schrempf (10)	Nate McMillan (6)	KeyArena; 17,072	1–1
3	April 28	@ Minnesota	L 90–98	Gary Payton (26)	Vin Baker (12)	three players tied (5)	Target Center; 19,006	1–2
4	April 30	@ Minnesota	W 92–88	Payton, Hawkins (24)	Vin Baker (12)	Gary Payton (8)	Target Center; 19,006	2–2
5	May 2	Minnesota	W 97–84	Gary Payton (29)	Detlef Schrempf (11)	three players tied (4)	KeyArena; 17,072	3–2

Conference Semi-finals: 1–4 (home: 1–2; road: 0–2)

Game	Date	Team	Score	High points	High rebounds	High assists	Location Attendance	Series
1	May 4	L.A. Lakers	W 106–92	Gary Payton (25)	Hawkins, Baker (8)	Gary Payton (6)	KeyArena; 17,072	1–0
2	May 6	L.A. Lakers	L 68–92	Vin Baker (13)	Detlef Schrempf (8)	Gary Payton (5)	KeyArena; 17,072	1–1
3	May 8	@ L.A. Lakers	L 103–119	Detlef Schrempf (26)	Vin Baker (12)	Gary Payton (13)	Great Western Forum; 17,505	1–2
4	May 10	@ L.A. Lakers	L 100–112	Gary Payton (31)	Gary Payton (8)	Gary Payton (13)	Great Western Forum; 17,505	1–3
5	May 12	L.A. Lakers	L 95–110	Vin Baker (28)	Vin Baker (9)	Hersey Hawkins (6)	KeyArena; 17,072	1–4

1998 schedule

== Player statistics ==
Legend
GP	Games played	GS	Games started	MPG	Minutes per game
FG%	Field-goal percentage	3P%	3-point field-goal percentage	FT%	Free-throw percentage
RPG	Rebounds per game	APG	Assists per game	SPG	Steals per game
BPG	Blocks per game	PPG	Points per game

=== Season ===
Player	GP	GS	MPG	FG%	3P%	FT%	RPG	APG	SPG	BPG	PPG
Gary Payton	82	82	38.4	.453	.338	.744	4.6	8.3	2.3	.2	19.2
Vin Baker	82	82	35.9	.542	.143	.591	8.0	1.9	1.1	1.0	19.2
Hersey Hawkins	82	82	31.7	.440	.415	.868	4.1	2.7	1.8	.2	10.5
Sam Perkins	81	0	20.7	.416	.392	.789	3.1	1.4	.8	.4	7.2
Greg Anthony	80	0	12.8	.430	.415	.663	1.4	2.6	.8	.0	5.2
Dale Ellis	79	0	24.5	.497	.464	.782	2.3	1.1	.8	.1	11.8
Detlef Schrempf	78	78	35.2	.487	.415	.844	7.1	4.4	.8	.2	15.8
Jim McIlvaine	78	72	15.5	.453	.000	.556	3.3	.2	.3	1.8	3.2
Aaron Williams	65	9	11.6	.523	.000	.776	2.3	.2	.3	.6	4.6
David Wingate	58	2	9.4	.471	.429	.517	1.4	.6	.4	.1	2.6
Jerome Kersey	37	2	19.4	.416	.100	.600	3.6	1.2	1.4	.4	6.3
Nate McMillan	18	1	15.5	.343	.441	1.000	2.2	3.1	.8	.2	3.4
Eric Snow^{†}	17	0	4.4	.435	.000	.500	.2	.8	.0	.1	1.5
Stephen Howard	13	0	4.1	.381		.500	.9	.2	.2	.1	1.9
James Cotton	9	0	3.7	.381	.000	.889	.7	.0	.1	.1	2.7
George Zidek^{†}	6	0	3.7	.214	.500	1.000	.7	.2	.0	.0	1.8

=== Playoffs ===
Player	GP	GS	MPG	FG%	3P%	FT%	RPG	APG	SPG	BPG	PPG
Gary Payton	10	10	42.8	.475	.380	.940	3.4	7.0	1.8	.1	24.0
Detlef Schrempf	10	10	37.5	.512	.143	.816	7.7	3.9	.7	.1	16.1
Vin Baker	10	10	37.1	.530		.421	9.4	1.8	1.8	1.5	15.8
Hersey Hawkins	10	10	33.7	.466	.395	.875	5.7	3.6	1.8	.1	13.4
Jerome Kersey	10	5	21.3	.431	.000	.842	4.0	.9	1.0	1.0	7.8
Sam Perkins	10	1	21.0	.381	.417	.600	3.2	1.4	.3	.5	5.4
Dale Ellis	10	0	17.0	.377	.423	.833	1.3	.6	.2	.0	5.6
Greg Anthony	9	0	13.1	.300	.263	.375	1.1	1.1	.6	.1	3.6
Nate McMillan	7	0	14.1	.333	.167	1.000	2.3	2.1	.4	.3	2.3
Jim McIlvaine	6	4	9.8	.300	.000	.500	1.7	.2	.3	1.0	2.2
David Wingate	3	0	4.3	.400		.667	1.3	.7	.3	.0	2.7
Aaron Williams	3	0	2.3	.000		1.000	.3	.0	.0	.3	.7

Player statistics citation:

== Awards and records ==
=== Awards ===
- Gary Payton, All-NBA First Team
- Gary Payton, NBA All-Defensive First Team
- Vin Baker, All-NBA Second Team

== Transactions ==
=== Free agents ===
==== Additions ==== : Player / Signed / Former team	==== Subtractions ==== : Player / Left / New team

== See also ==
- 1997–98 NBA season
