= 1997–98 Denver Nuggets season =

NBA professional basketball team season

- Head coach: Bill Hanzlik
- General manager: Allan Bristow; Mike D'Antoni; Dan Issel
- Arena: McNichols Sports Arena

Results
- Record: 11–71 (.134)
- Place: Division: 7th (Midwest); Conference: 14th (Western)
- Playoff finish: Did not qualify
- Stats at Basketball Reference

Local media
- Television: KWGN-TV; Fox Sports Rocky Mountain
- Radio: KKFN

The 1997–98 Denver Nuggets season was the 22nd season for the Denver Nuggets in the National Basketball Association, and their 31st season as a franchise.

== Season summary ==
=== Off-season ===
The Nuggets received the fifth overall pick in the 1997 NBA draft, and selected power forward Tony Battie out of Texas Tech University; the team also acquired Johnny Newman, Joe Wolf, and rookie power forward, and first-round draft pick Danny Fortson out of the University of Cincinnati from the Milwaukee Bucks on draft day. During the off-season, the Nuggets acquired Eric Williams from the Boston Celtics, acquired rookie point guard, and first-round draft pick Bobby Jackson out of the University of Minnesota from the Seattle SuperSonics, acquired rookie shooting guard, and second-round draft pick Eric Washington out of the University of Alabama from the Orlando Magic, and signed free agent and second-year center Dean Garrett. The team also hired former Nuggets player Bill Hanzlik as their new head coach.

=== Regular season ===
Under Hanzlik and despite the addition of Williams, Garrett, Jackson, Battie and Fortson, the Nuggets set numerous unwanted records during this season, which started off with the team losing their first twelve games of the regular season. Williams suffered a devastating knee injury after only just four games, and was out for the remainder of the season, averaging 19.8 points and 5.3 rebounds per game, while Bryant Stith only played just 31 games due to ankle and foot injuries. After 40 games and a dreadful 23-game losing streak, which was tied with the 1995–96 Vancouver Grizzlies, the Nuggets had a 2–38 record (.050 in winning percentage), a mark equalled only by the 1993–94 Dallas Mavericks. With the team holding a 4–42 record at the All-Star break, General Manager Allan Bristow was fired.

At mid-season, the Nuggets signed free agent Cory Alexander, who was previously released by the San Antonio Spurs. The team later on posted a 16-game losing streak between February and March, before finally avoiding a possibility of the worst-ever NBA record against the Golden State Warriors on March 27, 1998. The Nuggets finished in last place in the Midwest Division with the league's worst record at 11–71, which was also the team's worst record in franchise history. Their eleven wins equaled the third-fewest in an 82-game NBA season along with the 1992–93 Dallas Mavericks, and just like the Mavericks were for a long time viewed as likely to beat the 1972–73 Philadelphia 76ers record of winning only nine games in a full season, and the 2015–16 76ers, who only won just ten games. Incidentally, the NFL's Denver Broncos had won the Super Bowl earlier in 1998 and would go towards the Super Bowl again in the same year when this occurred.

Newman played a sixth man role off the bench, leading the Nuggets in scoring with 14.7 points per game, while LaPhonso Ellis averaged 14.3 points and 7.2 rebounds per game, and Alexander provided the team with 14.0 points, 6.0 assists and 2.0 steals per game in 23 games. In addition, Jackson contributed 11.6 points, 4.7 assists and 1.5 steals per game, and was named to the NBA All-Rookie Second Team, while Fortson provided with 10.2 points and 5.6 rebounds per game, Anthony Goldwire contributed 9.2 points and 3.4 assists per game, and Battie averaged 8.4 points and 5.4 rebounds per game. Meanwhile, Garrett averaged 7.3 points, 7.9 rebounds and 1.6 blocks per game, Washington contributed 7.7 points per game, and Stith contributed 7.6 points per game. The Nuggets had the worst team defensive rating in the NBA.

During the NBA All-Star weekend at Madison Square Garden in New York City, New York, Jackson and Fortson were both selected for the NBA Rookie Game, as members of the Western Conference Rookie team. Jackson scored 15 points along with 7 assists and 4 steals, despite the Western Conference losing to the Eastern Conference, 85–80. The Nuggets finished 28th in the NBA in home-game attendance, with an attendance of 380,590 at the McNichols Sports Arena during the regular season, which was the second-lowest in the league.

=== Aftermath ===
The unfortunate season meant Hanzlik was fired after a single season in charge of the team. Following the season, Ellis signed as a free agent with the Atlanta Hawks after six seasons with the Nuggets, while Newman re-signed with his former team, the Cleveland Cavaliers, and Garrett and Jackson were both traded to the Minnesota Timberwolves. Meanwhile, Battie was traded to the Los Angeles Lakers on draft day, who then traded him to the Boston Celtics several months later, and Goldwire and Wolf were both released to free agency.

In his 2007 study The NBA from Top to Bottom, basketball enthusiast Kyle Wright argued that in fact the 1997–98 Nuggets were a worse team than the 1972–73 76ers, saying that they played a worse schedule in the Midwest Division than the 1972–73 76ers did in their Atlantic Division where a dominant Boston Celtics team was played seven times by the 76ers. In contrast, Wright says, "the Nuggets got to play the 62–20 Utah Jazz only four times".

== Draft picks ==
Round	Pick	Player	Position	Nationality	School/Club team
1	5	Tony Battie	PF/C	United States	Texas Tech
2	33	James Cotton	SG	United States	Long Beach State
2	42	Jason Lawson	C	United States	Villanova

== Roster ==
1997–98 Denver Nuggets roster
Players

Pos.	No.	Player	Height	Weight	DOB	From
G	7	Cory Alexander	6 ft 1 in (1.85 m)	185 lb (84 kg)	1973–06–22	Virginia
F/C	4	Tony Battie	6 ft 11 in (2.11 m)	230 lb (104 kg)	1976–02–11	Texas Tech
G/F	3	Harold Ellis	6 ft 5 in (1.96 m)	200 lb (91 kg)	1970–10–07	Morehouse
F	20	LaPhonso Ellis	6 ft 8 in (2.03 m)	240 lb (109 kg)	1970–05–05	Notre Dame
F	15	Danny Fortson	6 ft 7 in (2.01 m)	260 lb (118 kg)	1976–03–27	Cincinnati
C	21	Dean Garrett	6 ft 10 in (2.08 m)	225 lb (102 kg)	1966–11–27	Indiana
G	5	Anthony Goldwire	6 ft 1 in (1.85 m)	182 lb (83 kg)	1971–09–06	Houston
G	13	Bobby Jackson	6 ft 1 in (1.85 m)	185 lb (84 kg)	1973–03–13	Minnesota
C	30	Priest Lauderdale	7 ft 4 in (2.24 m)	325 lb (147 kg)	1973–08–31	Central State
G/F	22	Johnny Newman	6 ft 7 in (2.01 m)	190 lb (86 kg)	1963–11–28	Richmond
G	23	Bryant Stith	6 ft 5 in (1.96 m)	208 lb (94 kg)	1970–12–10	Virginia
G	14	Eric Washington	6 ft 4 in (1.93 m)	190 lb (86 kg)	1974–03–23	Alabama
F	32	Eric Williams (injured)	6 ft 8 in (2.03 m)	220 lb (100 kg)	1972–07–17	Providence
F/C	17	Joe Wolf (injured)	6 ft 11 in (2.11 m)	230 lb (104 kg)	1964–12–17	North Carolina

Coaches
Head coach
- Bill Hanzlik
Assistant(s)
- Mike D'Antoni
- T. R. Dunn
- Brian Winters

Legend
- (DP) Unsigned draft pick
- (FA) Free agent
- (S) Suspended
- Injured

Roster
Updated: March 13, 1998

== Regular season ==
=== Season standings ===
Midwest Division	W	L	PCT	GB	Home	Road	Div
z-Utah Jazz	62	20	.756	–	36–5	26–15	22–2
x-San Antonio Spurs	56	26	.683	6	31–10	25–16	18–6
x-Minnesota Timberwolves	45	37	.549	17	26–15	19–22	14–10
x-Houston Rockets	41	41	.500	21	24–17	17–24	14–10
Dallas Mavericks	20	62	.244	42	13–28	7–34	9–15
Vancouver Grizzlies	19	63	.232	43	14–27	5–36	4–20
Denver Nuggets	11	71	.134	51	9–32	2–39	3–21

#	Western Conference				
#	Team	W	L	PCT	GB
1	z-Utah Jazz	62	20	.756	–
2	y-Seattle SuperSonics	61	21	.744	1
3	x-Los Angeles Lakers	61	21	.744	1
4	x-Phoenix Suns	56	26	.683	6
5	x-San Antonio Spurs	56	26	.683	6
6	x-Portland Trail Blazers	46	36	.561	16
7	x-Minnesota Timberwolves	45	37	.549	17
8	x-Houston Rockets	41	41	.500	21
9	Sacramento Kings	27	55	.329	35
10	Dallas Mavericks	20	62	.244	42
11	Vancouver Grizzlies	19	63	.232	43
12	Golden State Warriors	19	63	.232	43
13	Los Angeles Clippers	17	65	.207	45
14	Denver Nuggets	11	71	.134	51

z – clinched division title
y – clinched division title
x – clinched playoff spot

=== Game log ===
1997–98 game log
Total: 11–71 (home: 9–32; road: 2–39)
October: 0–1 (home: 0–1; road: 0–0)

Game	Date	Team	Score	Location Attendance	Record
1	October 31	San Antonio Spurs	96–107	McNichols Sports Arena	0–1

November: 1–11 (home: 1–4; road: 0–7)

Game	Date	Team	Score	Location Attendance	Record
2	November 1	@ Utah Jazz	84–102	Delta Center	0–2
3	November 4	Washington Wizards	96–120	McNichols Sports Arena	0–3
4	November 7	Utah Jazz	89–91	McNichols Sports Arena	0–4
5	November 11	@ New York Knicks	90–93	Madison Square Garden	0–5
6	November 12	@ Boston Celtics	86–96	Fleet Center	0–6
7	November 14	@ Orlando Magic	85–103	Orlando Arena	0–7
8	November 15	@ Miami Heat	93–96	Miami Arena	0–8
9	November 18	Vancouver Grizzlies	87–100	McNichols Sports Arena	0–9
10	November 21	@ Vancouver Grizzlies	96–99	General Motors Place	0–10
11	November 22	Seattle SuperSonics	80–84	McNichols Sports Arena	0–11
12	November 25	@ Sacramento Kings	93–97	ARCO Arena	0–12
13	November 28	Minnesota Timberwolves	95–84	McNichols Sports Arena	1–12

December: 1–14 (home: 1–7; road: 0–7)

Game	Date	Team	Score	Location Attendance	Record
14	December 2	@ Houston Rockets	101–112	The Summit	1–13
15	December 3	Los Angeles Lakers	89–107	McNichols Sports Arena	1–14
16	December 5	Indiana Pacers	85–96	McNichols Sports Arena	1–15
17	December 7	Los Angeles Clippers	100–92	McNichols Sports Arena	2–15
18	December 9	@ Detroit Pistons	83–92	The Palace of Auburn Hills	2–16
19	December 10	@ Cleveland Cavaliers	106–119	Gund Arena	2–17
20	December 12	@ Phoenix Suns	81–102	America West Arena	2–18
21	December 13	@ New Jersey	95–133	Continental Airlines Arena	2–19
22	December 16	San Antonio Spurs	85–99	McNichols Sports Arena	2–20
23	December 18	@ Seattle SuperSonics	106–119	KeyArena	2–21
24	December 20	Phoenix Suns	81–102	McNichols Sports Arena	2–22
25	December 23	@ Golden State Warriors	75–87	The Arena in Oakland	2–23
26	December 26	Golden State Warriors	120–131	McNichols Sports Arena	2–24
27	December 27	@ Los Angeles Clippers	103–105	Los Angeles Memorial Sports Arena	2–25
28	December 30	Utah Jazz	99–132	McNichols Sports Arena	2–26

January: 2–14 (home: 1–7; road: 1–7)

Game	Date	Team	Score	Location Attendance	Record
29	January 2	Houston Rockets	115–116 OT	McNichols Sports Arena	2–27
30	January 3	@ Minnesota Timberwolves	87–109	Target Center	2–28
31	January 6	@ Dallas Mavericks	90–108	Reunion Arena	2–29
32	January 7	@ San Antonio Spurs	89–96	Alamodome	2–30
33	January 9	Miami Heat	79–98	McNichols Sports Arena	2–31
34	January 13	Orlando Magic	84–98	McNichols Sports Arena	2–32
35	January 14	@ Los Angeles Lakers	114–132	Great Western Forum	2–33
36	January 16	Cleveland Cavaliers	74–99	McNichols Sports Arena	2–34
37	January 18	@ Portland Trail Blazers	82–94	Rose Garden Arena	2–35
38	January 20	@ Vancouver Grizzlies	77–88	General Motors Place	2–36
39	January 21	Detroit Pistons	67–87	McNichols Sports Arena	2–37
40	January 23	@ Phoenix Suns	77–93	America West Arena	2–38
41	January 24	@ Los Angeles Clippers	99–81	Los Angeles Memorial Sports Arena	3–38
42	January 27	New Jersey Nets	87–120	McNichols Sports Arena	3–39
43	January 29	Toronto Raptors	80–84	McNichols Sports Arena	3–40
44	January 31	Dallas Mavericks	110–98	McNichols Sports Arena	4–40

February: 1–11 (home: 1–6; road: 0–5)

Game	Date	Team	Score	Location Attendance	Record
45	February 2	Chicago Bulls	72–111	McNichols Sports Arena	4–41
46	February 4	Sacramento Kings	99–101	McNichols Sports Arena	4–42
47	February 10	Boston Celtics	112–99	McNichols Sports Arena	5–42
48	February 12	@ Sacramento Kings	84–87	ARCO Arena	5–43
49	February 13	Minnesota Timberwolves	80–107	McNichols Sports Arena	5–44
50	February 15	@ Portland Trail Blazers	82–117	Rose Garden Arena	5–45
51	February 17	New York Knicks	77–91	McNichols Sports Arena	5–46
52	February 19	@ Los Angeles Lakers	114–132	Great Western Forum	5–47
53	February 20	@ Golden State Warriors	88–95	The Arena in Oakland	5–48
54	February 22	@ Seattle SuperSonics	68–88	KeyArena	5–49
55	February 23	Charlotte Hornets	98–118	McNichols Sports Arena	5–50
56	February 25	Atlanta Hawks	88–112	McNichols Sports Arena	5–51
57	February 27	Philadelphia 76ers	78–79	McNichols Sports Arena	5–52

March: 4–11 (home: 3–4; road: 1–7)

Game	Date	Team	Score	Location Attendance	Record
58	March 1	@ Indiana Pacers	63–90	Market Square Arena	5–53
59	March 3	@ Chicago Bulls	90–118	United Center	5–54
60	March 5	@ Milwaukee Bucks	87–104	Bradley Center	5–55
61	March 6	@ Atlanta Hawks	94–115	Alexander Memorial Coliseum	5–56
62	March 8	Los Angeles Clippers	89–100	McNichols Sports Arena	5–57
63	March 10	Phoenix Suns	106–104	McNichols Sports Arena	5–58
64	March 12	Vancouver Grizzlies	98–93	McNichols Sports Arena	6–58
65	March 14	Portland Trail Blazers	92–82	McNichols Sports Arena	7–58
66	March 16	Charlotte Hornets	87–109	Charlotte Coliseum	7–59
67	March 17	@ Washington Wizards	90–89	MCI Center	8–59
68	March 19	@ Toronto Raptors	103–104 OT	SkyDome	8–60
69	March 20	@ Minnesota Timberwolves	88–104	Target Center	8–61
70	March 23	Los Angeles Lakers	86–107	McNichols Sports Arena	8–62
71	March 25	Dallas Mavericks	94–105	McNichols Sports Arena	8–63
72	March 27	Golden State Warriors	97–89	McNichols Sports Arena	9–63

April: 2–8 (home: 2–3; road: 0–5)

Game	Date	Team	Score	Location Attendance	Record
73	April 1	Milwaukee Bucks	100–106	McNichols Sports Arena	9–64
74	April 3	@ Utah Jazz	75–97	Delta Center	9–65
75	April 5	Seattle SuperSonics	83–87	McNichols Sports Arena	9–66
76	April 7	Houston Rockets	87–104	McNichols Sports Arena	9–67
77	April 9	Sacramento Kings	128–103	McNichols Sports Arena	10–67
78	April 11	@ Dallas Mavericks	81–99	Reunion Arena	10–68
79	April 14	@ Houston Rockets	88–94	The Summit	10–69
80	April 15	@ Phoenix Suns	89–96	America West Arena	10–70
81	April 17	Portland Trail Blazers	109–101	McNichols Sports Arena	11–70
82	April 19	@ San Antonio Spurs	82–96	Alamodome	11–71

1997–98 schedule

== Player statistics ==
Legend
GP	Games played	GS	Games started	MPG	Minutes per game
FG%	Field-goal percentage	3P%	3-point field-goal percentage	FT%	Free-throw percentage
RPG	Rebounds per game	APG	Assists per game	SPG	Steals per game
BPG	Blocks per game	PPG	Points per game

Player	GP	GS	MPG	FG%	3FG%	FT%	RPG	APG	SPG	BPG	PPG
Dean Garrett	82	82	32.1	.428	N/A	.648	7.9	1.1	0.7	1.6	7.3
Anthony Goldwire	82	32	27.0	.423	.384	.806	1.8	3.4	1.0	0.1	9.2
Danny Fortson	80	23	22.6	.452	.333	.776	5.6	1.0	0.6	0.4	10.2
LaPhonso Ellis	76	71	33.9	.407	.284	.805	7.2	2.8	0.9	0.6	14.3
Johnny Newman	74	15	29.4	.431	.343	.820	1.9	1.9	1.0	0.3	14.7
Bobby Jackson	68	53	30.0	.392	.259	.814	4.4	4.7	1.5	0.2	11.6
Eric Washington	66	36	23.3	.404	.321	.783	1.9	1.2	0.8	0.4	7.7
Tony Battie	65	49	23.2	.446	.214	.702	5.4	0.9	0.8	1.1	8.4
Joe Wolf	57	8	10.9	.331	.200	.500	2.6	0.5	0.4	0.1	1.5
Priest Lauderdale	39	0	8.8	.417	N/A	.551	2.2	0.5	0.2	0.4	3.7
Bryant Stith	31	15	23.2	.333	.208	.872	2.1	1.6	0.7	0.3	7.6
Kiwane Garris	28	0	8.0	.338	.357	.760	0.7	1.0	0.3	0.0	2.4
Harold Ellis	27	3	12.7	.559	.000	.635	1.9	0.7	0.7	0.1	6.1
Cory Alexander	23	19	34.7	.435	.411	.846	4.3	6.0	2.0	0.3	14.0
George Zidek	6	0	7.0	.267	N/A	.833	2.2	0.2	0.0	0.3	3.0
Eric Williams	4	4	36.3	.393	N/A	.689	5.3	3.0	1.0	0.0	19.8

Player statistics citation:

== Awards and records ==
- Bobby Jackson, NBA All-Rookie Team 2nd Team

== See also ==
- 1997–98 NBA season
