= 1997–98 Utah Jazz season =

NBA professional basketball team season

- Conference champions
- Division champions
- Head coach: Jerry Sloan
- General manager: Tim Howells
- Owner: Larry H. Miller
- Arena: Delta Center

Results
- Record: 62–20 (.756)
- Place: Division: 1st (Midwest); Conference: 1st (Western)
- Playoff finish: NBA Finals (lost to Bulls 2–4)
- Stats at Basketball Reference

Local media
- Television: KJZZ-TV; Fox Sports Utah
- Radio: KFNZ

The 1997–98 Utah Jazz season was the 24th season for the Utah Jazz in the National Basketball Association, and their 19th season in Salt Lake City, Utah. The Jazz had been runner-ups in the 1997 NBA Finals, where they lost to the Chicago Bulls in six games. In the 1997–98 season, the Jazz again reached the Finals, and were again defeated by the Bulls in six games.

== Season summary ==
=== Regular season ===
During the off-season, All-Star point guard John Stockton sustained a knee injury that caused him to miss the first 18 games of the regular season. Without Stockton, the Jazz lost four of their first six games, and got off to an 11–7 start to the season. The team also changed their starting lineup, replacing Bryon Russell at small forward with Adam Keefe, and replacing Greg Ostertag at center with Greg Foster. However, Stockton eventually returned as the Jazz posted a seven-game winning streak between December and January, and later on held a 31–15 record at the All-Star break.

At mid-season, the team traded Foster and Chris Morris to the Orlando Magic in exchange for Rony Seikaly. However, after Seikaly failed to report within the mandated 48 hours required by NBA rules because of a foot injury, the trade was called off as the Jazz took Foster and Morris back; the Magic then traded Seikaly to the New Jersey Nets. The Jazz won 31 of their final 36 games after the All-Star break, including an 11-game winning streak between February and March. The Jazz finished in first place in the Midwest Division with a league-best 62–20 record, and earned the first seed in the Western Conference; their record was also tied with the Bulls as the league's best record. The team qualified for the NBA playoffs for the 15th consecutive year.

Karl Malone averaged 27.0 points, 10.3 rebounds and 3.9 assists per game, and was named to the All-NBA First Team, and to the NBA All-Defensive First Team, while Jeff Hornacek averaged 14.2 points, 4.4 assists and 1.4 steals per game, and Stockton provided the team with 12.0 points, 8.5 assists and 1.4 steals per game. In addition, Russell played a sixth man role off the bench, averaging 9.0 points per game, while second-year guard Shandon Anderson contributed 8.3 points per game, and Howard Eisley, who started at point guard for the first 18 games in Stockton's absence, provided with 7.7 points and 4.2 assists per game. On the defensive side, Keefe averaged 7.8 points and 5.5 rebounds per game, while Foster provided with 5.7 points and 3.5 rebounds per game, Antoine Carr contributed 5.7 points per game, and Ostertag averaged 4.7 points, 5.9 rebounds and 2.1 blocks per game.

During the NBA All-Star weekend at Madison Square Garden in New York City, New York, Malone was selected for the 1998 NBA All-Star Game, as a member of the Western Conference All-Star team. In addition, Malone also participated in the inaugural NBA 2Ball Competition, along with Tammi Reiss of the WNBA's Utah Starzz, and Hornacek won the NBA Three-Point Shootout. Malone finished in second place in Most Valuable Player voting behind Michael Jordan of the Chicago Bulls, who won his fifth MVP award with 92 first-place votes, while Malone had 20 first-place votes, while Stockton finished tied in 13th place; Malone also finished tied in 13th place in Most Improved Player voting, and head coach Jerry Sloan finished in second place in Coach of the Year voting, behind Larry Bird of the Indiana Pacers.

The Jazz finished fourth in the NBA in home-game attendance with an attendance of 815,889 at the Delta Center during the regular season.

=== NBA playoffs ===
In the Western Conference First Round of the 1998 NBA playoffs, and for the second consecutive year, the Jazz faced off against the 8th–seeded Houston Rockets, a team that featured the All-Star trio of Hakeem Olajuwon, Clyde Drexler and Charles Barkley. With the series tied at 1–1, the Jazz struggled and faced elimination after losing Game 3 to the Rockets on the road, 89–85 at The Summit as the Rockets took a 2–1 series lead. However, the Jazz managed to win Game 4 on the road, 93–71 to even the series, before winning Game 5 over the Rockets at home, 84–70 at the Delta Center, thus winning in a hard-fought five-game series.

In the Western Conference Semi-finals, the team faced off against the 5th–seeded San Antonio Spurs, who were led by All-Star center David Robinson, All-Star forward and Rookie of the Year, Tim Duncan, and Avery Johnson. The Jazz took a 2–0 series lead before losing Game 3 to the Spurs on the road, 86–64 at the Alamodome; the Jazz struggled only shooting .286 in field-goal percentage in Game 3. However, the Jazz won the next two games, including a Game 5 home win over the Spurs at the Delta Center, 87–77 to win the series in five games.

In the Western Conference Finals, and also for the second consecutive year, the Jazz faced off against the 3rd–seeded Los Angeles Lakers, who were led by the All-Star quartet of Shaquille O'Neal, Eddie Jones, second-year star Kobe Bryant, and Nick Van Exel. The Jazz won the first two games at the Delta Center, which included a Game 1 win over the Lakers by a 35-point margin, 112–77. The Jazz won the next two games on the road, including a Game 4 win over the Lakers at the Great Western Forum, 96–92 to win the series in a four-game sweep, and advance to the NBA Finals for the second consecutive year.

In the 1998 NBA Finals, and in a rematch of last year's Finals, the Jazz once again faced off against the top–seeded, and 2-time defending NBA champion Bulls, who were led by the trio of All-Star guard, and Most Valuable Player of the Year, Michael Jordan, All-Star forward Scottie Pippen, and rebound-specialist Dennis Rodman. The Jazz had home-court advantage in the series after winning the regular-season series over the Bulls in two games. The Jazz won Game 1 over the Bulls at the Delta Center in overtime, 88–85, but then lost the next three games as the Bulls took a 3–1 series lead. The Jazz managed to win Game 5 over the Bulls on the road, 83–81 at the United Center. However, the Jazz lost Game 6 to the Bulls at the Delta Center, 87–86, with Jordan making the game-winning shot over Russell. The Jazz lost the series in six games, as the Bulls won their third consecutive NBA championship and sixth overall in eight years.

Game 3 of the NBA Finals would especially be infamous for the Jazz by it being the lowest-scoring effort by a team not just in a playoff match, but in an NBA Finals match in general with only 54 total points scored by them in a blowout 96–54 defeat that night. Game 6 of the 1998 NBA Finals is known for a notable moment in NBA history, as it featured the last shot that Jordan would ever make while playing for the Bulls. To date, this is the last NBA Finals appearance for the Jazz (or the Bulls).

== Offseason ==
=== NBA draft ===
| Round | Pick | Player | Position | Nationality | College |
|---|---|---|---|---|---|
| 1 | 27 | Jacque Vaughn | PG | United States | Kansas |
| 2 | 56 | Nate Erdmann | SG | United States | Oklahoma |

The Jazz used two picks; a first-round pick on point guard Jacque Vaughn and a second round pick on Nate Erdmann. Vaughn would play with the team for four seasons before going to the Atlanta Hawks and Erdmann was cut from the team before regular season began.

== Roster ==
1997–98 Utah Jazz roster
Players

| Pos. | No. | Player | Height | Weight | DOB | From |
|---|---|---|---|---|---|---|
| G | 40 | Shandon Anderson | 6 ft 6 in (1.98 m) | 208 lb (94 kg) | 1973–12–31 | Georgia |
| F | 55 | Antoine Carr | 6 ft 9 in (2.06 m) | 225 lb (102 kg) | 1961–07–23 | Wichita State |
| G | 10 | Howard Eisley | 6 ft 2 in (1.88 m) | 177 lb (80 kg) | 1972–12–04 | Boston College |
| C | 44 | Greg Foster | 6 ft 11 in (2.11 m) | 240 lb (109 kg) | 1968–10–03 | UTEP |
| G | 14 | Jeff Hornacek | 6 ft 3 in (1.91 m) | 190 lb (86 kg) | 1963–05–03 | Iowa State |
| F/C | 31 | Adam Keefe | 6 ft 9 in (2.06 m) | 230 lb (104 kg) | 1970–02–22 | Stanford |
| F | 32 | Karl Malone | 6 ft 9 in (2.06 m) | 250 lb (113 kg) | 1963–07–24 | Louisiana Tech |
| F | 34 | Chris Morris | 6 ft 8 in (2.03 m) | 210 lb (95 kg) | 1966–01–20 | Auburn |
| C | 00 | Greg Ostertag | 7 ft 2 in (2.18 m) | 280 lb (127 kg) | 1973–03–06 | Kansas |
| F | 3 | Bryon Russell | 6 ft 7 in (2.01 m) | 225 lb (102 kg) | 1970–12–31 | Long Beach State |
| G | 12 | John Stockton | 6 ft 1 in (1.85 m) | 170 lb (77 kg) | 1962–03–26 | Gonzaga |
| G | 11 | Jacque Vaughn | 6 ft 1 in (1.85 m) | 190 lb (86 kg) | 1975–02–11 | Kansas |

Coaches
Head coach
- Jerry Sloan
Assistant(s)
- Gordon Chiesa
- David Fredman
- Phil Johnson
- Mark McKown
- Kenny Natt

Legend
- (DP) Unsigned draft pick
- (FA) Free agent
- (S) Suspended
- Injured

Roster
Updated: February 14, 1998

=== Roster Notes ===
- Rookie point guard Troy Hudson was waived on December 28, 1997.

=== Salaries ===
| Player | Salary |
|---|---|
| Karl Malone | $5,118,578 |
| John Stockton | $5,000,000 |
| Jeff Hornacek | $4,195,000 |
| Chris Morris | $3,000,000 |
| Bryon Russell | $2,857,144 |
| Adam Keefe | $2,300,000 |
| Antoine Carr | $1,600,000 |
| Howard Eisley | $1,240,000 |
| Shandon Anderson | $1,200,000 |
| Greg Ostertag | $647,400 |
| Jacque Vaughn | $601,320 |
| Greg Foster | $504,000 |
| Troy Hudson | $242,000 |
| Total | $28,505,442 |

== Regular season ==
=== Season standings ===
| Midwest Division | W | L | PCT | GB | Home | Road | Div |
|---|---|---|---|---|---|---|---|
| z-Utah Jazz | 62 | 20 | .756 | – | 36–5 | 26–15 | 22–2 |
| x-San Antonio Spurs | 56 | 26 | .683 | 6 | 31–10 | 25–16 | 18–6 |
| x-Minnesota Timberwolves | 45 | 37 | .549 | 17 | 26–15 | 19–22 | 14–10 |
| x-Houston Rockets | 41 | 41 | .500 | 21 | 24–17 | 17–24 | 14–10 |
| Dallas Mavericks | 20 | 62 | .244 | 42 | 13–28 | 7–34 | 9–15 |
| Vancouver Grizzlies | 19 | 63 | .232 | 43 | 14–27 | 5–36 | 4–20 |
| Denver Nuggets | 11 | 71 | .134 | 51 | 9–32 | 2–39 | 3–21 |

| # | Western Conference | | | | |
| # | Team | W | L | PCT | GB |
|---|---|---|---|---|---|
| 1 | z-Utah Jazz | 62 | 20 | .756 | – |
| 2 | y-Seattle SuperSonics | 61 | 21 | .744 | 1 |
| 3 | x-Los Angeles Lakers | 61 | 21 | .744 | 1 |
| 4 | x-Phoenix Suns | 56 | 26 | .683 | 6 |
| 5 | x-San Antonio Spurs | 56 | 26 | .683 | 6 |
| 6 | x-Portland Trail Blazers | 46 | 36 | .561 | 16 |
| 7 | x-Minnesota Timberwolves | 45 | 37 | .549 | 17 |
| 8 | x-Houston Rockets | 41 | 41 | .500 | 21 |
| 9 | Sacramento Kings | 27 | 55 | .329 | 35 |
| 10 | Dallas Mavericks | 20 | 62 | .244 | 42 |
| 11 | Vancouver Grizzlies | 19 | 63 | .232 | 43 |
| 12 | Golden State Warriors | 19 | 63 | .232 | 43 |
| 13 | Los Angeles Clippers | 17 | 65 | .207 | 45 |
| 14 | Denver Nuggets | 11 | 71 | .134 | 51 |

=== Game log ===
1997–98 game log
Total: 62–20 (home: 36–5; road: 26–15)
October: 0–1 (home: 0–0; road: 0–1)

| Game | Date | Team | Score | High points | High rebounds | High assists | Location Attendance | Record |
|---|---|---|---|---|---|---|---|---|
| 1 | October 31 | @ L.A. Lakers | L 87–104 | Shandon Anderson (21) | Karl Malone (14) | Howard Eisley (6) | Great Western Forum; 16,234 | 0–1 |

November: 9–5 (home: 6–2; road: 3–3)

| Game | Date | Team | Score | High points | High rebounds | High assists | Location Attendance | Record |
|---|---|---|---|---|---|---|---|---|
| 2 | November 1 | Denver | W 102–84 | Karl Malone (24) | Greg Ostertag (11) | Eisley, Hornacek (6) | Delta Center; 19,911 | 1–1 |
| 3 | November 3 | Washington | L 86–90 | Karl Malone (21) | Karl Malone (16) | Hornacek, Vaughn (6) | Delta Center; 19,911 | 1–2 |
| 4 | November 4 | @ Phoenix | L 84–106 | Karl Malone (22) | Malone, Ostertag (11) | Jeff Hornacek (4) | America West Arena; 19,023 | 1–3 |
| 5 | November 7 | @ Denver | W 91–89 | Karl Malone (20) | Karl Malone (11) | Howard Eisley (6) | McNichols Sports Arena; 10,317 | 2–3 |
| 6 | November 8 | @ San Antonio | L 80–87 | Karl Malone (26) | Hornacek, Malone (7) | Howard Eisley (6) | Alamodome; 19,100 | 2–4 |
| 7 | November 12 | Vancouver | W 98–80 | Karl Malone (26) | Keefe, Ostertag (9) | Howard Eisley (10) | Delta Center; 19,851 | 3–4 |
| 8 | November 14 | Seattle | W 110–104 | Hornacek, Malone (23) | Karl Malone (12) | Howard Eisley (6) | Delta Center; 19,830 | 4–4 |
| 9 | November 15 | @ Dallas | W 85–77 | Karl Malone (26) | Karl Malone (10) | Jeff Hornacek (10) | Reunion Arena; 14,323 | 5–4 |
| 10 | November 18 | L.A. Lakers | L 92–97 | Karl Malone (26) | Karl Malone (9) | Howard Eisley (7) | Delta Center; 19,911 | 5–5 |
| 11 | November 20 | @ Sacramento | L 95–97 | Karl Malone (32) | Karl Malone (9) | Howard Eisley (8) | ARCO Arena; 14,648 | 5–6 |
| 12 | November 22 | San Antonio | W 103–74 | Karl Malone (20) | Karl Malone (11) | Hornacek, Malone (7) | Delta Center; 19,911 | 6–6 |
| 13 | November 24 | Minnesota | W 133–124 (OT) | Karl Malone (33) | Foster, Malone (9) | Howard Eisley (10) | Delta Center; 19,911 | 7–6 |
| 14 | November 28 | Golden State | W 111–82 | Karl Malone (21) | Greg Ostertag (10) | Jacque Vaughn (8) | Delta Center; 19,911 | 8–6 |
| 15 | November 29 | @ L.A. Clippers | W 94–91 | Karl Malone (42) | Karl Malone (18) | Jeff Hornacek (7) | Los Angeles Memorial Sports Arena; 14,956 | 9–6 |

December: 10–5 (home: 5–1; road: 5–4)

| Game | Date | Team | Score | High points | High rebounds | High assists | Location Attendance | Record |
|---|---|---|---|---|---|---|---|---|
| 16 | December 1 | New Jersey | W 100–95 | Karl Malone (19) | Karl Malone (14) | Howard Eisley (7) | Delta Center; 19,911 | 10–6 |
| 17 | December 3 | Toronto | W 115–98 | Karl Malone (23) | Karl Malone (15) | Eisley, Hornacek (8) | Delta Center; 19,590 | 11–6 |
| 18 | December 5 | @ Portland | L 77–94 | Karl Malone (24) | Karl Malone (12) | Jeff Hornacek (8) | Rose Garden Arena; 19,545 | 11–7 |
| 19 | December 8 | Indiana | W 106–97 | Karl Malone (31) | Greg Ostertag (9) | John Stockton (7) | Delta Center; 19,911 | 12–7 |
| 20 | December 9 | @ Sacramento | L 101–113 | Karl Malone (34) | Karl Malone (10) | John Stockton (5) | ARCO Arena; 13,624 | 12–8 |
| 21 | December 12 | Dallas | W 68–66 | Karl Malone (23) | Adam Keefe (11) | Malone, Stockton (4) | Delta Center; 19,911 | 13–8 |
| 22 | December 15 | @ Washington | L 86–88 | Karl Malone (26) | Karl Malone (13) | Eisley, Malone (6) | MCI Center; 18,756 | 13–9 |
| 23 | December 16 | @ Miami | W 103–95 | Karl Malone (29) | Antoine Carr (7) | Howard Eisley (6) | Miami Arena; 15,200 | 14–9 |
| 24 | December 18 | @ Orlando | W 85–73 | Karl Malone (30) | Greg Ostertag (10) | Malone, Stockton (5) | Orlando Arena; 17,258 | 15–9 |
| 25 | December 21 | @ Cleveland | L 101–106 | Karl Malone (24) | Karl Malone (13) | Hornacek, Stockton (6) | Gund Arena; 19,178 | 15–10 |
| 26 | December 22 | @ Atlanta | W 101–99 | Karl Malone (27) | Adam Keefe (10) | John Stockton (8) | Georgia Dome; 28,371 | 16–10 |
| 27 | December 25 | Houston | W 107–103 | John Stockton (24) | Karl Malone (10) | Jeff Hornacek (9) | Delta Center; 19,911 | 17–10 |
| 28 | December 27 | Portland | L 91–102 | Karl Malone (24) | Karl Malone (11) | John Stockton (9) | Delta Center; 19,911 | 17–11 |
| 29 | December 28 | @ Vancouver | W 89–88 | Karl Malone (26) | Karl Malone (13) | John Stockton (7) | General Motors Place; 16,488 | 18–11 |
| 30 | December 30 | @ Denver | W 132–99 | Greg Ostertag (21) | Karl Malone (10) | John Stockton (9) | McNichols Sports Arena; 14,230 | 19–11 |

January: 10–3 (home: 8–1; road: 2–2)

| Game | Date | Team | Score | High points | High rebounds | High assists | Location Attendance | Record |
|---|---|---|---|---|---|---|---|---|
| 31 | January 3 | Atlanta | W 97–82 | Karl Malone (20) | Greg Ostertag (10) | John Stockton (12) | Delta Center; 19,911 | 20–11 |
| 32 | January 6 | Philadelphia | W 98–95 (OT) | Hornacek, Malone (21) | Greg Ostertag (9) | John Stockton (14) | Delta Center; 19,911 | 21–11 |
| 33 | January 8 | Milwaukee | W 116–109 | Karl Malone (39) | Greg Ostertag (10) | John Stockton (13) | Delta Center; 19,911 | 22–11 |
| 34 | January 10 | @ Houston | W 111–84 | Karl Malone (24) | Karl Malone (9) | Anderson, Eisley (7) | The Summit; 16,285 | 23–11 |
| 35 | January 12 | Cleveland | W 106–99 | Jeff Hornacek (23) | Karl Malone (11) | John Stockton (12) | Delta Center; 19,911 | 24–11 |
| 36 | January 16 | @ Portland | L 86–96 | Karl Malone (23) | Karl Malone (15) | John Stockton (6) | Rose Garden Arena; 21,538 | 24–12 |
| 37 | January 17 | Orlando | W 107–93 | Karl Malone (32) | Keefe, Malone (9) | John Stockton (10) | Delta Center; 19,911 | 25–12 |
| 38 | January 19 | Detroit | W 98–89 | Karl Malone (30) | Karl Malone (15) | John Stockton (13) | Delta Center; 19,911 | 26–12 |
| 39 | January 21 | Golden State | W 98–85 | Karl Malone (27) | Adam Keefe (8) | John Stockton (13) | Delta Center; 19,911 | 27–12 |
| 40 | January 23 | @ Indiana | L 102–106 | Karl Malone (26) | Greg Ostertag (11) | John Stockton (11) | Market Square Arena; 16,670 | 27–13 |
| 41 | January 25 | @ Chicago | W 101–94 | Karl Malone (35) | Karl Malone (11) | John Stockton (10) | United Center; 24,361 | 28–13 |
| 42 | January 28 | Seattle | L 93–101 | Karl Malone (27) | Karl Malone (15) | John Stockton (14) | Delta Center; 19,911 | 28–14 |
| 43 | January 30 | Dallas | W 104–94 | Karl Malone (29) | Greg Ostertag (12) | Eisley, Stockton (10) | Delta Center; 19,911 | 29–14 |

February: 9–2 (home: 6–1; road: 3–1)

| Game | Date | Team | Score | High points | High rebounds | High assists | Location Attendance | Record |
|---|---|---|---|---|---|---|---|---|
| 44 | February 1 | @ Golden State | W 115–88 | Karl Malone (20) | Karl Malone (8) | Karl Malone (9) | The Arena In Oakland; 11,269 | 30–14 |
| 45 | February 3 | @ L.A. Clippers | L 102–111 | Karl Malone (23) | Karl Malone (7) | John Stockton (10) | Los Angeles Memorial Sports Arena; 13,553 | 30–15 |
| 46 | February 4 | Chicago | W 101–93 | Karl Malone (30) | Karl Malone (8) | John Stockton (18) | Delta Center; 19,911 | 31–15 |
All-Star Break
| 47 | February 10 | L.A. Clippers | W 106–98 | Karl Malone (29) | Karl Malone (14) | John Stockton (10) | Delta Center; 19,911 | 32–15 |
| 48 | February 12 | Boston | W 118–100 | Karl Malone (31) | Karl Malone (12) | Howard Eisley (10) | Delta Center; 19,911 | 33–15 |
| 49 | February 14 | @ Seattle | W 111–91 | Karl Malone (34) | Karl Malone (8) | John Stockton (12) | KeyArena; 17,072 | 34–15 |
| 50 | February 16 | Charlotte | W 96–90 | Karl Malone (23) | Adam Keefe (12) | John Stockton (9) | Delta Center; 19,911 | 35–15 |
| 51 | February 18 | New York | W 94–78 | Karl Malone (25) | Adam Keefe (12) | Jeff Hornacek (6) | Delta Center; 19,911 | 36–15 |
| 52 | February 21 | @ San Antonio | W 79–77 | Karl Malone (24) | Karl Malone (13) | John Stockton (6) | Alamodome; 26,572 | 37–15 |
| 53 | February 24 | Miami | L 102–104 | Karl Malone (26) | Karl Malone (11) | John Stockton (10) | Delta Center; 19,911 | 37–16 |
| 54 | February 26 | Phoenix | W 108–97 | Karl Malone (28) | Karl Malone (17) | Howard Eisley (10) | Delta Center; 19,911 | 38–16 |

March: 15–2 (home: 5–0; road: 10–2)

| Game | Date | Team | Score | High points | High rebounds | High assists | Location Attendance | Record |
|---|---|---|---|---|---|---|---|---|
| 55 | March 1 | @ Houston | W 106–100 | Karl Malone (21) | Karl Malone (9) | John Stockton (14) | The Summit; 16,285 | 39–16 |
| 56 | March 3 | @ Toronto | W 108–93 | Shandon Anderson (26) | Karl Malone (10) | John Stockton (11) | SkyDome; 16,448 | 40–16 |
| 57 | March 4 | @ Boston | W 110–94 | Karl Malone (32) | Karl Malone (15) | John Stockton (9) | FleetCenter; 18,624 | 41–16 |
| 58 | March 6 | @ New Jersey | W 122–115 | Karl Malone (32) | Karl Malone (12) | John Stockton (9) | Continental Airlines Arena; 20,049 | 42–16 |
| 59 | March 7 | @ Milwaukee | W 110–92 | Karl Malone (40) | Karl Malone (8) | John Stockton (7) | Bradley Center; 18,717 | 43–16 |
| 60 | March 9 | Houston | W 100–93 | Karl Malone (29) | Karl Malone (21) | Karl Malone (6) | Delta Center; 19,911 | 44–16 |
| 61 | March 11 | Sacramento | W 110–95 | Karl Malone (25) | Karl Malone (9) | Karl Malone (9) | Delta Center; 19,911 | 45–16 |
| 62 | March 13 | Vancouver | W 110–101 | Karl Malone (30) | Adam Keefe (11) | John Stockton (11) | Delta Center; 19,911 | 46–16 |
| 63 | March 15 | @ Detroit | W 109–98 | Karl Malone (28) | Karl Malone (9) | Eisley, Stockton (7) | The Palace of Auburn Hills; 22,076 | 47–16 |
| 64 | March 16 | @ Minnesota | W 102–96 | Karl Malone (29) | Greg Foster (10) | three players tied (8) | Target Center; 17,333 | 48–16 |
| 65 | March 18 | @ Charlotte | L 85–111 | Karl Malone (17) | Malone, Russell (9) | John Stockton (7) | Charlotte Coliseum; 23,305 | 48–17 |
| 66 | March 20 | @ Philadelphia | W 91–79 | Karl Malone (23) | Karl Malone (16) | Howard Eisley (7) | CoreStates Center; 20,832 | 49–17 |
| 67 | March 22 | @ New York | W 124–119 (2OT) | Karl Malone (30) | Karl Malone (14) | John Stockton (14) | Madison Square Garden; 19,763 | 50–17 |
| 68 | March 24 | Phoenix | W 92–73 | Karl Malone (19) | Greg Foster (15) | John Stockton (11) | Delta Center; 19,911 | 51–17 |
| 69 | March 27 | @ Dallas | W 99–90 | Karl Malone (33) | Karl Malone (14) | Jeff Hornacek (8) | Reunion Arena; 13,763 | 52–17 |
| 70 | March 28 | L.A. Lakers | W 106–91 | Karl Malone (31) | Keefe, Malone (8) | John Stockton (9) | Delta Center; 19,911 | 53–17 |
| 71 | March 31 | @ Seattle | L 86–88 | Karl Malone (20) | Karl Malone (10) | Jeff Hornacek (7) | KeyArena; 17,072 | 53–18 |

April: 9–2 (home: 6–0; road: 3–2)

| Game | Date | Team | Score | High points | High rebounds | High assists | Location Attendance | Record |
|---|---|---|---|---|---|---|---|---|
| 72 | April 1 | Portland | W 98–89 | Jeff Hornacek (31) | Greg Ostertag (9) | John Stockton (9) | Delta Center; 19,911 | 54–18 |
| 73 | April 3 | Denver | W 97–75 | Karl Malone (22) | Greg Ostertag (8) | Howard Eisley (9) | Delta Center; 19,911 | 55–18 |
| 74 | April 5 | @ Vancouver | W 99–93 | Karl Malone (25) | Greg Ostertag (9) | John Stockton (8) | General Motors Place; 18,068 | 56–18 |
| 75 | April 7 | @ Golden State | W 101–99 | Karl Malone (56) | Foster, Malone (9) | John Stockton (14) | The Arena In Oakland; 14,430 | 57–18 |
| 76 | April 8 | San Antonio | W 98–88 | Karl Malone (32) | Karl Malone (10) | John Stockton (9) | Delta Center; 19,911 | 58–18 |
| 77 | April 10 | L.A. Clippers | W 126–109 | Jeff Hornacek (23) | Greg Foster (10) | Jeff Hornacek (6) | Delta Center; 19,911 | 59–18 |
| 78 | April 11 | @ Minnesota | L 103–110 | Karl Malone (37) | Karl Malone (12) | Jeff Hornacek (8) | Target Center; 20,051 | 59–19 |
| 79 | April 14 | Minnesota | W 126–109 | Karl Malone (44) | Karl Malone (14) | Malone, Stockton (6) | Delta Center; 19,911 | 60–19 |
| 80 | April 16 | Sacramento | W 99–86 | Karl Malone (21) | Karl Malone (8) | Jeff Hornacek (11) | Delta Center; 19,911 | 61–19 |
| 81 | April 17 | @ Phoenix | W 102–99 | Karl Malone (29) | Karl Malone (9) | Howard Eisley (10) | America West Arena; 19,023 | 62–19 |
| 82 | April 19 | @ L.A. Lakers | L 98–102 | Karl Malone (27) | Karl Malone (9) | Howard Eisley (4) | Great Western Forum; 17,505 | 62–20 |

1997–98 schedule

== Playoffs ==
1998 playoff game log
First Round: 3–2 (home: 2–1; road: 1–1)

| Game | Date | Team | Score | High points | High rebounds | High assists | Location Attendance | Series |
|---|---|---|---|---|---|---|---|---|
| 1 | April 23 | Houston | L 90–103 | Karl Malone (25) | Karl Malone (11) | John Stockton (8) | Delta Center; 19,911 | 0–1 |
| 2 | April 25 | Houston | W 105–90 | Karl Malone (29) | Greg Ostertag (11) | John Stockton (10) | Delta Center; 19,911 | 1–1 |
| 3 | April 29 | @ Houston | L 85–89 | Malone, Russell (19) | Karl Malone (14) | Stockton, Eisley (6) | Compaq Center; 16,285 | 1–2 |
| 4 | May 1 | @ Houston | W 93–71 | Karl Malone (29) | Karl Malone (13) | John Stockton (7) | Compaq Center; 16,285 | 2–2 |
| 5 | May 3 | Houston | W 84–70 | Karl Malone (31) | Karl Malone (15) | John Stockton (10) | Delta Center; 19,911 | 3–2 |

Conference semifinals: 4–1 (home: 3–0; road: 1–1)

| Game | Date | Team | Score | High points | High rebounds | High assists | Location Attendance | Series |
|---|---|---|---|---|---|---|---|---|
| 1 | May 5 | San Antonio | W 83–82 | Karl Malone (25) | Karl Malone (8) | John Stockton (8) | Delta Center; 19,911 | 1–0 |
| 2 | May 7 | San Antonio | W 109–106 (OT) | Karl Malone (22) | Karl Malone (12) | John Stockton (12) | Delta Center; 19,911 | 2–0 |
| 3 | May 9 | @ San Antonio | L 64–86 | Karl Malone (18) | Greg Ostertag (9) | Hornacek, Vaughn (3) | Alamodome; 26,086 | 2–1 |
| 4 | May 10 | @ San Antonio | W 82–73 | Karl Malone (34) | Karl Malone (12) | John Stockton (7) | Alamodome; 28,587 | 3–1 |
| 5 | May 12 | San Antonio | W 87–77 | Karl Malone (24) | Karl Malone (13) | Howard Eisley (7) | Delta Center; 19,911 | 4–1 |

Conference finals: 4–0 (home: 2–0; road: 2–0)

| Game | Date | Team | Score | High points | High rebounds | High assists | Location Attendance | Series |
|---|---|---|---|---|---|---|---|---|
| 1 | May 16 | L.A. Lakers | W 112–77 | Karl Malone (29) | Shandon Anderson (11) | Stockton, Eisley (9) | Delta Center; 19,911 | 1–0 |
| 2 | May 18 | L.A. Lakers | W 99–95 | Karl Malone (33) | Malone, Russell (7) | John Stockton (6) | Delta Center; 19,911 | 2–0 |
| 3 | May 22 | @ L.A. Lakers | W 109–98 | Karl Malone (26) | Karl Malone (10) | John Stockton (8) | Great Western Forum; 17,505 | 3–0 |
| 4 | May 24 | @ L.A. Lakers | W 96–92 | Karl Malone (32) | Karl Malone (14) | John Stockton (8) | Great Western Forum; 17,505 | 4–0 |

NBA Finals: 2–4 (home: 1–2; road: 1–2)

| Game | Date | Team | Score | High points | High rebounds | High assists | Location Attendance | Series |
|---|---|---|---|---|---|---|---|---|
| 1 | June 3 | Chicago | W 88–85 (OT) | John Stockton (24) | Karl Malone (14) | John Stockton (8) | Delta Center; 19,911 | 1–0 |
| 2 | June 5 | Chicago | L 88–93 | Jeff Hornacek (20) | Karl Malone (12) | Eisley, Stockton (7) | Delta Center; 19,911 | 1–1 |
| 3 | June 7 | @ Chicago | L 54–96 | Karl Malone (22) | Greg Ostertag (9) | John Stockton (7) | United Center; 23,844 | 1–2 |
| 4 | June 10 | @ Chicago | L 82–86 | Karl Malone (21) | Karl Malone (14) | John Stockton (13) | United Center; 23,844 | 1–3 |
| 5 | June 12 | @ Chicago | W 83–81 | Karl Malone (39) | Karl Malone (9) | John Stockton (12) | United Center; 23,844 | 2–3 |
| 6 | June 14 | Chicago | L 86–87 | Karl Malone (31) | Karl Malone (11) | Karl Malone (7) | Delta Center; 19,911 | 2–4 |

1998 schedule

== Player statistics ==
Legend
| GP | Games played | GS | Games started | MPG | Minutes per game |
| FG% | Field-goal percentage | 3P% | 3-point field-goal percentage | FT% | Free-throw percentage |
| RPG | Rebounds per game | APG | Assists per game | SPG | Steals per game |
| BPG | Blocks per game | PPG | Points per game |

=== Season ===
| Player | GP | GS | MPG | FG% | 3FG% | FT% | RPG | APG | SPG | BPG | PPG |
|---|---|---|---|---|---|---|---|---|---|---|---|
| Shandon Anderson | 82 | 2 | 19.5 | .538 | .219 | .735 | 2.8 | 1.1 | .8 | .2 | 8.3 |
| Antoine Carr | 66 | 8 | 16.5 | .465 | . | .776 | 2.0 | .7 | .2 | .8 | 5.7 |
| William Cunningham | 6 | 2 | 6.3 | .444 | . | . | 1.3 | .2 | .3 | .0 | 1.3 |
| Howard Eisley | 82 | 18 | 21.0 | .441 | .407 | .852 | 2.0 | 4.2 | .7 | .2 | 7.7 |
| Greg Foster | 78 | 49 | 18.5 | .445 | .222 | .770 | 3.5 | .7 | .2 | .4 | 5.7 |
| Jeff Hornacek | 80 | 80 | 30.8 | .482 | .441 | .885 | 3.4 | 4.4 | 1.4 | .2 | 14.2 |
| Troy Hudson | 8 | 0 | 2.9 | .429 | .000 | . | .3 | .5 | .3 | .0 | 1.5 |
| Adam Keefe | 80 | 75 | 25.6 | .540 | . | .810 | 5.5 | 1.1 | .7 | .3 | 7.8 |
| Karl Malone | 81 | 81 | 37.4 | .530 | .333 | .761 | 10.3 | 3.9 | 1.2 | .9 | 27.0 |
| Chris Morris | 54 | 1 | 10.0 | .411 | .306 | .721 | 2.1 | .4 | .5 | .3 | 4.3 |
| Greg Ostertag | 63 | 23 | 20.4 | .481 | . | .479 | 5.9 | .4 | .4 | 2.1 | 4.7 |
| Bryon Russell | 82 | 7 | 27.1 | .430 | .341 | .766 | 4.0 | 1.2 | 1.1 | .4 | 9.0 |
| John Stockton | 64 | 64 | 29.0 | .528 | .429 | .827 | 2.6 | 8.5 | 1.4 | .2 | 12.0 |
| Jacque Vaughn | 45 | 0 | 9.3 | .361 | .375 | .706 | .8 | 1.9 | .2 | .0 | 3.1 |

=== Playoffs ===
| Player | GP | GS | MPG | FG% | 3FG% | FT% | RPG | APG | SPG | BPG | PPG |
|---|---|---|---|---|---|---|---|---|---|---|---|
| Shandon Anderson | 20 | 0 | 18.9 | .515 | .273 | .676 | 3.2 | 1.0 | .3 | .1 | 6.7 |
| Antoine Carr | 20 | 0 | 14.6 | .456 | . | .750 | 2.1 | .6 | .1 | .6 | 4.4 |
| Howard Eisley | 20 | 0 | 18.3 | .368 | .296 | .923 | 2.0 | 4.1 | .6 | .3 | 5.6 |
| Greg Foster | 20 | 16 | 16.8 | .453 | .500 | .600 | 3.4 | .3 | .1 | .3 | 4.1 |
| Jeff Hornacek | 20 | 20 | 31.8 | .416 | .467 | .846 | 2.5 | 3.2 | 1.0 | .2 | 10.9 |
| Adam Keefe | 15 | 10 | 10.3 | .345 | . | .647 | 2.3 | .1 | .3 | .1 | 2.1 |
| Karl Malone | 20 | 20 | 39.8 | .471 | .000 | .788 | 10.9 | 3.4 | 1.1 | 1.0 | 26.3 |
| Chris Morris | 17 | 0 | 14.1 | .406 | .304 | .700 | 2.8 | .6 | .3 | .2 | 4.5 |
| Greg Ostertag | 19 | 1 | 17.7 | .565 | . | .480 | 4.3 | .3 | .4 | 1.9 | 3.4 |
| Bryon Russell | 20 | 13 | 34.9 | .469 | .365 | .716 | 4.7 | 1.1 | 1.1 | .3 | 11.0 |
| John Stockton | 20 | 20 | 29.8 | .494 | .346 | .718 | 3.0 | 7.8 | 1.6 | .2 | 11.1 |
| Jacque Vaughn | 7 | 0 | 3.4 | .200 | .500 | 1.000 | .4 | .6 | . | . | 1.0 |

Player statistics citation:

== Awards and records ==
- Karl Malone, All-NBA First Team
- Karl Malone, NBA All-Defensive First Team
- Karl Malone, NBA Leader, Free Throw Attempts (825)

== See also ==
- 1997–98 NBA season
