= 1997–98 San Antonio Spurs season =

- Head coach: Gregg Popovich
- President: Gregg Popovich (vice)
- General manager: Gregg Popovich
- Owner: Peter Holt
- Arena: Alamodome

Results
- Record: 56–26 (.683)
- Place: Division: 2nd (Midwest); Conference: 5th (Western)
- Playoff finish: Conference semifinals (lost to Jazz 1–4)
- Stats at Basketball Reference

Local media
- Television: KSAT-TV; KRRT; Fox Sports Southwest
- Radio: WOAI

The 1997–98 San Antonio Spurs season was the 22nd season for the San Antonio Spurs in the National Basketball Association, and their 31st season as a franchise.

== Season summary ==
=== Off-season ===
This season was most memorable when the Spurs won the NBA draft lottery after finishing with a 20–62 record the previous season, and selected power forward Tim Duncan out of Wake Forest University with the first overall pick in the 1997 NBA draft. During the off-season, the team signed free agents, three-point specialist Jaren Jackson and second-year forward Malik Rose.

=== Regular season ===
With the addition of Duncan and Jackson, the Spurs won six of their first seven games of the regular season, but then lost 9 of their next 13 games, leading to a mediocre 10–10 start to the season. However, the team soon recovered winning 17 of their next 19 games, which included a seven-game winning streak in December, and later on held a 34–14 record at the All-Star break. Despite losing Sean Elliott for the remainder of the season due to a knee injury after 36 games, the Spurs finished in second place in the Midwest Division with a 56–26 record, which was a 36-game improvement over the previous season; the team earned the fifth seed in the Western Conference, and returned to the NBA playoffs after a one-year absence. The Spurs had the second best team defensive rating in the NBA.

Duncan averaged 21.1 points, 11.9 rebounds and 2.7 blocks per game, and was named the NBA Rookie of the Year, and was also named to the All-NBA First Team, and to the NBA All-Rookie First Team, while David Robinson averaged 21.6 points, 10.6 rebounds and 2.6 blocks per game, and was named to the All-NBA Second Team; Duncan and Robinson were both named to the NBA All-Defensive Second Team. In addition, Avery Johnson provided the team with 10.2 points and 7.9 assists per game, while Vinny Del Negro contributed 9.5 points and 3.4 assists per game, and Elliott provided with 9.3 points per game. Off the bench, Jackson contributed 8.8 points per game and led the Spurs with 112 three-point field goals, while three-point specialist Chuck Person contributed 6.7 points per game, Monty Williams provided with 6.3 points per game, and Will Perdue averaged 5.0 points and 6.8 rebounds per game.

During the NBA All-Star weekend at Madison Square Garden in New York City, New York, Duncan and Robinson were both selected for the 1998 NBA All-Star Game, as members of the Western Conference All-Star team; it was Duncan's first ever All-Star appearance. Duncan finished in fifth place in Most Valuable Player voting, while Robinson finished in seventh place; Robinson also finished in third place in Defensive Player of the Year voting, while Duncan finished tied in fifth place.

The Spurs finished eighth in the NBA in home-game attendance, with an attendance of 783,455 at the Alamodome during the regular season.

=== NBA playoffs ===
In the Western Conference First Round of the 1998 NBA playoffs, the Spurs faced off against the 4th–seeded Phoenix Suns, a team that featured Rex Chapman, Antonio McDyess, and All-Star guard Jason Kidd. Despite both teams finishing with the same regular-season record, the Suns had home-court advantage in the series; this was also Duncan's first ever NBA playoff appearance. In their first two road games at the America West Arena, the Spurs won Game 1 over the Suns, 102–96, but then lost Game 2 by a score of 108–101, as the Suns evened the series. The Spurs won the next two games at home, which included a Game 4 win over the Suns at the Alamodome, 99–80 to win the series in four games.

In the Western Conference Semi-finals, the team faced off against the top–seeded, and Midwest Division champion Utah Jazz, who were led by the trio of All-Star forward Karl Malone, All-Star guard John Stockton, and Jeff Hornacek. The Spurs lost the first two games to the Jazz on the road at the Delta Center, but managed to win Game 3 at the Alamodome, 86–64. However, the Spurs lost the next two games, including a Game 5 loss to the Jazz at the Delta Center, 87–77, thus losing the series in five games.

The Jazz would go on to lose in six games to the 2-time defending NBA champion Chicago Bulls in the 1998 NBA Finals for the second consecutive year.

=== Aftermath ===
Following the season, Del Negro signed as a free agent with the Milwaukee Bucks, while Person signed with the Charlotte Hornets, Williams was released to free agency, and Carl Herrera was traded to the Vancouver Grizzlies on draft day. Following the 1997–98 season, the Spurs would enjoy immense levels of success, winning five championships between 1999 and 2014, and qualifying for the playoffs every year until 2019, the longest playoff streak in NBA history, tied with the Syracuse Nationals/Philadelphia 76ers from 1950 to 1971.

== NBA draft ==
| Round | Pick | Player | Position | Nationality | College |
|---|---|---|---|---|---|
| 1 | 1 | Tim Duncan | PF/C | United States Virgin Islands | Wake Forest |

== Roster ==
1997–98 San Antonio Spurs roster
Players

| Pos. | No. | Player | Height | Weight | DOB | From |
|---|---|---|---|---|---|---|
| SF | 9 | Willie Burton | 6 ft 8 in (2.03 m) | 210 lb (95 kg) | 1968–05–26 | Minnesota |
| SG | 15 | Vinny Del Negro | 6 ft 4 in (1.93 m) | 185 lb (84 kg) | 1966–08–09 | NC State |
| PF | 21 | Tim Duncan | 6 ft 11 in (2.11 m) | 250 lb (113 kg) | 1976–04–25 | Wake Forest |
| SF | 32 | Sean Elliott | 6 ft 8 in (2.03 m) | 205 lb (93 kg) | 1968–02–02 | Arizona |
| PG | 4 | Reggie Geary | 6 ft 2 in (1.88 m) | 187 lb (85 kg) | 1973–08–31 | Arizona |
| PF | 7 | Carl Herrera | 6 ft 9 in (2.06 m) | 215 lb (98 kg) | 1966–12–14 | Houston |
| SG | 2 | Jaren Jackson | 6 ft 4 in (1.93 m) | 190 lb (86 kg) | 1967–10–27 | Georgetown |
| PG | 6 | Avery Johnson | 5 ft 10 in (1.78 m) | 175 lb (79 kg) | 1965–03–25 | Southern |
| PF | 54 | Brad Lohaus | 6 ft 11 in (2.11 m) | 230 lb (104 kg) | 1964–09–29 | Iowa |
| C | 41 | Will Perdue | 7 ft 0 in (2.13 m) | 240 lb (109 kg) | 1965–08–29 | Vanderbilt |
| PF | 45 | Chuck Person | 6 ft 8 in (2.03 m) | 220 lb (100 kg) | 1964–06–27 | Auburn |
| C | 50 | David Robinson | 7 ft 1 in (2.16 m) | 235 lb (107 kg) | 1965–08–06 | Navy |
| PF | 31 | Malik Rose | 6 ft 7 in (2.01 m) | 250 lb (113 kg) | 1974–11–23 | Drexel |
| SF | 3 | Monty Williams | 6 ft 8 in (2.03 m) | 225 lb (102 kg) | 1971–10–08 | Notre Dame |

Coaches
Head coach
- Gregg Popovich
Assistant(s)
- Mike Budenholzer
- Hank Egan
- Paul Pressey

Legend
- (DP) Unsigned draft pick
- (FA) Free agent
- (S) Suspended
- Injured

Roster

== Regular season ==
=== Tim Duncan ===
The Spurs were coming off a poor 1996–97 NBA season; in which their best player, David Robinson—himself a number one draft pick in 1987—was sidelined for most of the year with an injury. The Spurs had finished with a 20–62 win–loss record. However, as the 1997–98 NBA season approached, the Spurs were considered a notable threat in the NBA. With both an experienced center in Robinson and the number one pick in Duncan, the Spurs featured one of the best frontcourts in the NBA. Duncan and Robinson became known as the "Twin Towers", having earned a reputation for their exceptional defense close to the basket, forcing opponents to take lower percentage shots from outside. From the beginning, Duncan established himself as a quality player: in his second-ever road game, he grabbed 22 rebounds against opposing Chicago Bulls power forward Dennis Rodman, a multiple rebounding champion and NBA Defensive Player of the Year.

Later, when Duncan played against opposing Houston Rockets Hall-of-Fame power forward Charles Barkley, Barkley was so impressed he said: "I have seen the future and he wears number 21 [Duncan's jersey number]." In his rookie season, Duncan lived up the expectations of being the number one draft pick, starting in all 82 regular-season games, and averaging 21.1 points, 11.9 rebounds, 2.7 assists and 2.5 blocks per game. His defensive contributions ensured that he was elected to the NBA All-Defensive Second Team and was also named NBA Rookie of the Year. Spurs coach Gregg Popovich lauded Duncan's mental toughness, stating his rookie's "demeanor was singularly remarkable", Duncan always "put things into perspective" and never got "too upbeat or too depressed." Center Robinson was equally impressed with Duncan: "He's the real thing. I'm proud of his attitude and effort. He gives all the extra effort and work and wants to become a better player."

=== Season standings ===
| Midwest Division | W | L | PCT | GB | Home | Road | Div |
|---|---|---|---|---|---|---|---|
| z-Utah Jazz | 62 | 20 | .756 | – | 36–5 | 26–15 | 22–2 |
| x-San Antonio Spurs | 56 | 26 | .683 | 6 | 31–10 | 25–16 | 18–6 |
| x-Minnesota Timberwolves | 45 | 37 | .549 | 17 | 26–15 | 19–22 | 14–10 |
| x-Houston Rockets | 41 | 41 | .500 | 21 | 24–17 | 17–24 | 14–10 |
| Dallas Mavericks | 20 | 62 | .244 | 42 | 13–28 | 7–34 | 9–15 |
| Vancouver Grizzlies | 19 | 63 | .232 | 43 | 14–27 | 5–36 | 4–20 |
| Denver Nuggets | 11 | 71 | .134 | 51 | 9–32 | 2–39 | 3–21 |

| # | Western Conference | | | | |
| # | Team | W | L | PCT | GB |
|---|---|---|---|---|---|
| 1 | z-Utah Jazz | 62 | 20 | .756 | – |
| 2 | y-Seattle SuperSonics | 61 | 21 | .744 | 1 |
| 3 | x-Los Angeles Lakers | 61 | 21 | .744 | 1 |
| 4 | x-Phoenix Suns | 56 | 26 | .683 | 6 |
| 5 | x-San Antonio Spurs | 56 | 26 | .683 | 6 |
| 6 | x-Portland Trail Blazers | 46 | 36 | .561 | 16 |
| 7 | x-Minnesota Timberwolves | 45 | 37 | .549 | 17 |
| 8 | x-Houston Rockets | 41 | 41 | .500 | 21 |
| 9 | Sacramento Kings | 27 | 55 | .329 | 35 |
| 10 | Dallas Mavericks | 20 | 62 | .244 | 42 |
| 11 | Vancouver Grizzlies | 19 | 63 | .232 | 43 |
| 12 | Golden State Warriors | 19 | 63 | .232 | 43 |
| 13 | Los Angeles Clippers | 17 | 65 | .207 | 45 |
| 14 | Denver Nuggets | 11 | 71 | .134 | 51 |

== Playoffs ==
1998 playoff game log
First Round: 3–1 (home: 2–0; road: 1–1)

| Game | Date | Team | Score | High points | High rebounds | High assists | Location Attendance | Series |
|---|---|---|---|---|---|---|---|---|
| 1 | April 23 | @ Phoenix | W 102–96 | Tim Duncan (32) | David Robinson (15) | Vinny Del Negro (6) | America West Arena; 19,023 | 1–0 |
| 2 | April 25 | @ Phoenix | L 101–108 | David Robinson (23) | David Robinson (16) | Avery Johnson (8) | America West Arena; 19,023 | 1–1 |
| 3 | April 27 | Phoenix | W 100–88 | Tim Duncan (22) | Tim Duncan (14) | Avery Johnson (5) | Alamodome; 20,486 | 2–1 |
| 4 | April 29 | Phoenix | W 99–80 | Avery Johnson (30) | David Robinson (21) | Avery Johnson (7) | Alamodome; 27,528 | 3–1 |

Conference semifinals: 1–4 (home: 1–1; road: 0–3)

| Game | Date | Team | Score | High points | High rebounds | High assists | Location Attendance | Series |
|---|---|---|---|---|---|---|---|---|
| 1 | May 5 | @ Utah | L 82–83 | Tim Duncan (33) | David Robinson (16) | Avery Johnson (8) | Delta Center; 19,911 | 0–1 |
| 2 | May 7 | @ Utah | L 106–109 | Tim Duncan (26) | David Robinson (14) | Vinny Del Negro (5) | Delta Center; 19,911 | 0–2 |
| 3 | May 9 | Utah | W 86–64 | David Robinson (21) | Will Perdue (11) | Avery Johnson (5) | Alamodome; 26,086 | 1–2 |
| 4 | May 10 | Utah | L 73–82 | Tim Duncan (22) | David Robinson (11) | Avery Johnson (7) | Alamodome; 28,587 | 1–3 |
| 5 | May 12 | @ Utah | L 77–87 | David Robinson (21) | David Robinson (13) | Avery Johnson (8) | Delta Center; 19,911 | 1–4 |

1998 schedule

== Player statistics ==
=== Regular season ===
| Player | POS | GP | GS | MP | REB | AST | STL | BLK | PTS | MPG | RPG | APG | SPG | BPG | PPG |
|---|---|---|---|---|---|---|---|---|---|---|---|---|---|---|---|
| Tim Duncan | PF | 82 | 82 | 3,204 | 977 | 224 | 55 | 206 | 1,731 | 39.1 | 11.9 | 2.7 | .7 | 2.5 | 21.1 |
| Jaren Jackson | SG | 82 | 45 | 2,226 | 210 | 156 | 60 | 8 | 722 | 27.1 | 2.6 | 1.9 | .7 | .1 | 8.8 |
| Will Perdue | C | 79 | 30 | 1,491 | 535 | 57 | 22 | 50 | 394 | 18.9 | 6.8 | .7 | .3 | .6 | 5.0 |
| Avery Johnson | PG | 75 | 73 | 2,674 | 150 | 591 | 84 | 18 | 766 | 35.7 | 2.0 | 7.9 | 1.1 | .2 | 10.2 |
| David Robinson | C | 73 | 73 | 2,457 | 775 | 199 | 64 | 192 | 1,574 | 33.7 | 10.6 | 2.7 | .9 | 2.6 | 21.6 |
| Monty Williams | SF | 72 | 16 | 1,314 | 179 | 89 | 34 | 24 | 453 | 18.3 | 2.5 | 1.2 | .5 | .3 | 6.3 |
| Reggie Geary | PG | 62 | 2 | 685 | 67 | 74 | 37 | 12 | 152 | 11.0 | 1.1 | 1.2 | .6 | .2 | 2.5 |
| Chuck Person | PF | 61 | 11 | 1,455 | 204 | 86 | 29 | 10 | 409 | 23.9 | 3.3 | 1.4 | .5 | .2 | 6.7 |
| Carl Herrera | PF | 58 | 1 | 516 | 91 | 22 | 19 | 12 | 170 | 8.9 | 1.6 | .4 | .3 | .2 | 2.9 |
| Vinny Del Negro | SG | 54 | 38 | 1,721 | 152 | 183 | 39 | 6 | 513 | 31.9 | 2.8 | 3.4 | .7 | .1 | 9.5 |
| Malik Rose | PF | 53 | 0 | 429 | 90 | 19 | 21 | 7 | 158 | 8.1 | 1.7 | .4 | .4 | .1 | 3.0 |
| Cory Alexander^{†} | PG | 37 | 3 | 501 | 47 | 71 | 25 | 5 | 165 | 13.5 | 1.3 | 1.9 | .7 | .1 | 4.5 |
| Sean Elliott | SF | 36 | 36 | 1,012 | 124 | 62 | 24 | 14 | 334 | 28.1 | 3.4 | 1.7 | .7 | .4 | 9.3 |
| Willie Burton | SF | 13 | 0 | 43 | 9 | 1 | 2 | 2 | 27 | 3.3 | .7 | .1 | .2 | .2 | 2.1 |
| Brad Lohaus | PF | 9 | 0 | 102 | 12 | 5 | 1 | 2 | 19 | 11.3 | 1.3 | .6 | .1 | .2 | 2.1 |

- ^{†} Denotes player spent time with another team in the season. Stats reflect time with the Spurs only.

=== Playoffs ===
| Player | POS | GP | GS | MP | REB | AST | STL | BLK | PTS | MPG | RPG | APG | SPG | BPG | PPG |
|---|---|---|---|---|---|---|---|---|---|---|---|---|---|---|---|
| Tim Duncan | PF | 9 | 9 | 374 | 81 | 17 | 5 | 23 | 186 | 41.6 | 9.0 | 1.9 | .6 | 2.6 | 20.7 |
| David Robinson | C | 9 | 9 | 353 | 127 | 23 | 11 | 30 | 175 | 39.2 | 14.1 | 2.6 | 1.2 | 3.3 | 19.4 |
| Avery Johnson | PG | 9 | 9 | 342 | 13 | 55 | 9 | 0 | 156 | 38.0 | 1.4 | 6.1 | 1.0 | .0 | 17.3 |
| Jaren Jackson | SG | 9 | 8 | 319 | 39 | 14 | 5 | 1 | 92 | 35.4 | 4.3 | 1.6 | .6 | .1 | 10.2 |
| Will Perdue | C | 9 | 7 | 191 | 60 | 1 | 6 | 9 | 36 | 21.2 | 6.7 | .1 | .7 | 1.0 | 4.0 |
| Vinny Del Negro | SG | 9 | 3 | 283 | 24 | 29 | 8 | 0 | 96 | 31.4 | 2.7 | 3.2 | .9 | .0 | 10.7 |
| Chuck Person | PF | 9 | 0 | 196 | 27 | 7 | 4 | 0 | 52 | 21.8 | 3.0 | .8 | .4 | .0 | 5.8 |
| Reggie Geary | PG | 7 | 0 | 46 | 2 | 6 | 1 | 0 | 9 | 6.6 | .3 | .9 | .1 | .0 | 1.3 |
| Monty Williams | SF | 5 | 0 | 28 | 6 | 1 | 0 | 0 | 12 | 5.6 | 1.2 | .2 | .0 | .0 | 2.4 |
| Carl Herrera | PF | 5 | 0 | 25 | 4 | 1 | 0 | 0 | 2 | 5.0 | .8 | .2 | .0 | .0 | .4 |
| Malik Rose | PF | 5 | 0 | 18 | 7 | 1 | 1 | 0 | 10 | 3.6 | 1.4 | .2 | .2 | .0 | 2.0 |
| Brad Lohaus | PF | 4 | 0 | 10 | 2 | 1 | 1 | 0 | 0 | 2.5 | .5 | .3 | .3 | .0 | .0 |

== Award winners ==
- Tim Duncan, Forward, NBA Rookie of the Year
- Tim Duncan, Forward, All-NBA First Team
- Tim Duncan, Forward, All-NBA Rookie First Team
- Tim Duncan, Forward, All-NBA Second Defensive Team
- David Robinson, Center, All-NBA Second Team
- David Robinson, Center, All-NBA Second Defensive Team
