= 1997–98 Phoenix Suns season =

NBA team season

- Head coach: Danny Ainge
- General manager: Bryan Colangelo
- Owner: Jerry Colangelo
- Arena: America West Arena

Results
- Record: 56–26 (.683)
- Place: Division: 3rd (Pacific); Conference: 4th (Western)
- Playoff finish: First round (lost to Spurs 1–3)
- Stats at Basketball Reference

Local media
- Television: KUTP; Fox Sports Arizona; Cox Sports
- Radio: KTAR

The 1997–98 Phoenix Suns season was the 30th season for the Phoenix Suns in the National Basketball Association.

== Season summary ==
=== Off-season ===
During the off-season, the Suns acquired Antonio McDyess from the Denver Nuggets in a three-team trade, and signed free agents Clifford Robinson, and George McCloud. The team also signed former Suns, and All-Star forward Tom Chambers, who played for the team from 1988 to 1993, and also appeared in the 1993 NBA Finals; however, he was out due to a lower strained back injury prior to the regular season. In November, Chambers got into trouble after punching Suns strength and conditioning coach Robin Pound during an altercation, and was soon traded to the Philadelphia 76ers in exchange for Slovenian rookie small forward Marko Milič; Chambers would play one game for the 76ers before retiring from the NBA in December.

=== Regular season ===
In Danny Ainge's first full season as the team's head coach, and with the addition of McDyess and Robinson, the Suns won nine of their first eleven games of the regular season, and later on held a 31–15 record at the All-Star break. At mid-season, the team traded Cedric Ceballos to the Dallas Mavericks in exchange for three-point specialist Dennis Scott; before the trade, Ceballos averaged 9.5 points and 4.3 rebounds per game in 35 games. The Suns posted a 10-game winning streak between March and April, won eleven of their final twelve games of the season, and finished in third place in the Pacific Division with a 56–26 record, earning the fourth seed in the Western Conference; the team qualified for the NBA playoffs for the tenth consecutive year.

The team's top scorer Rex Chapman led the Suns with 15.9 points per game, and 120 three-point field goals, while McDyess averaged 15.1 points, 7.6 rebounds and 1.7 blocks per game, and Robinson provided the team with 14.2 points and 5.1 rebounds per game. In addition, Jason Kidd contributed 11.6 points, 6.2 rebounds, 9.1 assists and 2.0 steals per game, while sixth man Danny Manning averaged 13.5 points and 5.6 rebounds per game off the bench, and was named the NBA Sixth Man of the Year, and Kevin Johnson averaged 9.5 points and 4.9 assists per game, but only played just 50 games, starting in just 12 of them due to tendinitis in his right knee. Meanwhile, second-year guard Steve Nash provided with 9.1 points and 3.4 assists per game, McCloud contributed 7.2 points and 3.5 rebounds per game, Scott contributed 6.2 points per game in 29 games after the trade, Mark Bryant averaged 4.2 points and 3.5 rebounds per game, and Hot Rod Williams provided with 3.6 points and 4.4 rebounds per game.

During the NBA All-Star weekend at Madison Square Garden in New York City, New York, Kidd was selected for the 1998 NBA All-Star Game, as a member of the Western Conference All-Star team. Meanwhile, Nash participated in the inaugural NBA 2Ball Competition, along with Michele Timms of the WNBA's Phoenix Mercury. Kidd also finished tied in 13th place in Most Valuable Player voting, while Ainge finished tied in fifth place in Coach of the Year voting.

The Suns finished ninth in the NBA in home-game attendance, with an attendance of 779,943 at the America West Arena during the regular season.

=== NBA playoffs ===
In the Western Conference First Round of the 1998 NBA playoffs, the Suns faced off against the 5th–seeded San Antonio Spurs, who were led by All-Star center David Robinson, All-Star forward and Rookie of the Year, Tim Duncan, and Avery Johnson. Despite both teams finishing with the same regular-season record, the Suns had home-court advantage in the series; however, the team was without Manning, who was out due to a season-ending knee injury. The Suns lost Game 1 to the Spurs at home, 102–96 at the America West Arena, but managed to win Game 2 at home, 108–101 to even the series. However, the Suns lost the next two games on the road, which included a Game 4 loss to the Spurs at the Alamodome, 99–80, thus losing the series in four games.

=== Notable highlights ===
One notable highlight of the regular season occurred on November 14, 1997, in which the Suns defeated the Portland Trail Blazers on the road in quadruple-overtime, 140–139 at the Rose Garden Arena. Manning posted a double-double of 35 points and 10 rebounds off the bench, while Chapman scored 28 points, and McDyess added 17 points; Johnson posted a double-double of 15 points and 13 rebounds, and Kidd contributed 16 assists and 5 steals.

=== Aftermath ===
Following the season, McDyess re-signed as a free agent with his former team, the Denver Nuggets after only one season with the Suns, while Kevin Johnson retired after eleven seasons in the NBA, but would eventually make a comeback late during the 1999–2000 season. Meanwhile, Nash was traded to the Dallas Mavericks on draft day, Williams signed as a free agent with the Mavericks, Scott signed with the New York Knicks, and Bryant was traded to the Chicago Bulls.

== Offseason ==
=== NBA draft ===
| Round | Pick | Player | Position | Nationality | College |
|---|---|---|---|---|---|
| 2 | 43 | Stephen Jackson | SF/SG | United States | Butler CC |

The Suns used their only draft pick to select future star Stephen Jackson, who was waived before the start of the season. The Suns traded their first-round pick to the Cleveland Cavaliers in 1995 when they dealt Dan Majerle and Antonio Lang for John "Hot Rod" Williams.

== Roster ==
1997–98 Phoenix Suns roster
Players

| Pos. | No. | Player | Height | Weight | DOB | From |
|---|---|---|---|---|---|---|
| C | 52 | Mike Brown | 6 ft 9 in (2.06 m) | 257 lb (117 kg) | 1963–07–19 | George Washington |
| C | 2 | Mark Bryant | 6 ft 9 in (2.06 m) | 245 lb (111 kg) | 1965–04–25 | Seton Hall |
| G/F | 3 | Rex Chapman | 6 ft 4 in (1.93 m) | 185 lb (84 kg) | 1967–10–05 | Kentucky |
| G | 7 | Kevin Johnson | 6 ft 1 in (1.85 m) | 180 lb (82 kg) | 1966–03–04 | California |
| G | 32 | Jason Kidd | 6 ft 4 in (1.93 m) | 205 lb (93 kg) | 1973–03–23 | California |
| C | 17 | Horacio Llamas | 6 ft 11 in (2.11 m) | 285 lb (129 kg) | 1973–07–17 | Grand Canyon |
| F/C | 15 | Danny Manning (injured) | 6 ft 10 in (2.08 m) | 230 lb (104 kg) | 1966–05–17 | Kansas |
| F | 21 | George McCloud | 6 ft 6 in (1.98 m) | 205 lb (93 kg) | 1967–05–27 | Florida State |
| F | 34 | Antonio McDyess | 6 ft 9 in (2.06 m) | 220 lb (100 kg) | 1974–09–07 | Alabama |
| C | 40 | Loren Meyer (injured) (IN) | 6 ft 10 in (2.08 m) | 257 lb (117 kg) | 1972–12–30 | Iowa State |
| F | 20 | Marko Milič | 6 ft 6 in (1.98 m) | 235 lb (107 kg) | 1977–05–07 | Slovenia |
| G | 13 | Steve Nash | 6 ft 3 in (1.91 m) | 195 lb (88 kg) | 1974–02–07 | Santa Clara |
| F | 30 | Clifford Robinson | 6 ft 10 in (2.08 m) | 225 lb (102 kg) | 1966–12–16 | Connecticut |
| F | 4 | Dennis Scott | 6 ft 8 in (2.03 m) | 229 lb (104 kg) | 1968–09–05 | Georgia Tech |
| C | 18 | John Williams | 6 ft 11 in (2.11 m) | 215 lb (98 kg) | 1962–08–09 | Tulane |

Coaches
Head coach
- Danny Ainge
Assistant(s)
- Frank Johnson
- Roger Reid
- Scott Skiles

Legend
- (DP) Unsigned draft pick
- (FA) Free agent
- (S) Suspended
- (IN) Inactive
- Injured

=== Roster Notes ===
- Center Mike Brown did not play in any regular season games with the Suns this season, due to previously playing overseas in Italy. However, he was re-signed by the team on April 18, 1998, just one day before the final day of the regular season, and only played in one playoff game.
- Center Loren Meyer was on the injured reserve list due to a back injury, and missed the entire regular season.

=== Salaries ===
| Player | Salary |
|---|---|
| Kevin Johnson | $8,000,000 |
| Danny Manning | $6,833,333 |
| Jason Kidd | $5,223,333 |
| Hot Rod Williams | $4,550,000 |
| Antonio McDyess | $2,876,640 |
| Cedric Ceballos | $2,605,000 |
| Mark Bryant | $2,250,000 |
| Steve Nash | $1,053,360 |
| Clifford Robinson | $1,000,000 |
| Loren Meyer | $722,760 |
| Mario Bennett | $630,000 |
| Rex Chapman | $326,700 |
| Tom Chambers | $272,250 |
| George McCloud | $272,250 |
| Horacio Llamas | $272,250 |
| William Cunningham | $50,000 |
| Total | $36,937,876 |

== Regular season ==
=== Standings ===
| Pacific Division | W | L | PCT | GB | Home | Road | Div |
|---|---|---|---|---|---|---|---|
| y-Seattle SuperSonics | 61 | 21 | .744 | – | 35–6 | 26–15 | 19–5 |
| x-Los Angeles Lakers | 61 | 21 | .744 | – | 33–8 | 28–13 | 16–8 |
| x-Phoenix Suns | 56 | 26 | .683 | 5 | 30–11 | 26–15 | 17–7 |
| x-Portland Trail Blazers | 46 | 36 | .561 | 15 | 26–15 | 20–21 | 14–10 |
| Sacramento Kings | 27 | 55 | .329 | 34 | 21–20 | 6–35 | 6–18 |
| Golden State Warriors | 19 | 63 | .232 | 42 | 12–29 | 7–34 | 6–18 |
| Los Angeles Clippers | 17 | 65 | .207 | 44 | 11–30 | 6–35 | 6–18 |

| # | Western Conference | | | | |
| # | Team | W | L | PCT | GB |
|---|---|---|---|---|---|
| 1 | z-Utah Jazz | 62 | 20 | .756 | – |
| 2 | y-Seattle SuperSonics | 61 | 21 | .744 | 1 |
| 3 | x-Los Angeles Lakers | 61 | 21 | .744 | 1 |
| 4 | x-Phoenix Suns | 56 | 26 | .683 | 6 |
| 5 | x-San Antonio Spurs | 56 | 26 | .683 | 6 |
| 6 | x-Portland Trail Blazers | 46 | 36 | .561 | 16 |
| 7 | x-Minnesota Timberwolves | 45 | 37 | .549 | 17 |
| 8 | x-Houston Rockets | 41 | 41 | .500 | 21 |
| 9 | Sacramento Kings | 27 | 55 | .329 | 35 |
| 10 | Dallas Mavericks | 20 | 62 | .244 | 42 |
| 11 | Vancouver Grizzlies | 19 | 63 | .232 | 43 |
| 12 | Golden State Warriors | 19 | 63 | .232 | 43 |
| 13 | Los Angeles Clippers | 17 | 65 | .207 | 45 |
| 14 | Denver Nuggets | 11 | 71 | .134 | 51 |

== Playoffs ==
Even with a 56–26 record, the Suns were the fourth seed in the West heading into the Playoffs. They would face the fifth-seeded San Antonio Spurs, headlined by star center David Robinson and Rookie of the Year forward Tim Duncan. Duncan led the Spurs to a game one upset in Phoenix, scoring 28 second-half points in a 102–96 victory. The Suns recovered to win game two 108–101. Antonio McDyess led the Suns with 21 points and 11 rebounds, while holding Duncan to 16 points with six turnovers. On the night he received the Rookie of the Year Award, Duncan again led the Spurs with 22 points, 14 rebounds and 3 blocks. Despite 26 points and 17 rebounds from McDyess, the Suns fell 88–100 and into a 1–2 series hole. The Spurs would clinch the series 3–1 in San Antonio, behind 30 points from Avery Johnson, 21 rebounds from Robinson, and 6 blocks from Duncan. McDyess pulled down 19 rebounds for the Suns, but shot only 5 of 14 from the field, while Kevin Johnson led the team with 18 points.

=== Game log ===
1998 playoff game log
First Round: 1–3 (home: 1–1; road: 0–2)

| Game | Date | Team | Score | High points | High rebounds | High assists | Location Attendance | Series |
|---|---|---|---|---|---|---|---|---|
| 1 | April 23 | San Antonio | L 96–102 | Kevin Johnson (18) | George McCloud (9) | Jason Kidd (11) | America West Arena; 19,023 | 0–1 |
| 2 | April 25 | San Antonio | W 108–101 | George McCloud (22) | Antonio McDyess (11) | Jason Kidd (10) | America West Arena; 19,023 | 1–1 |
| 3 | April 27 | @ San Antonio | L 88–100 | Antonio McDyess (26) | Antonio McDyess (17) | Johnson, Kidd (6) | Alamodome; 20,486 | 1–2 |
| 4 | April 29 | @ San Antonio | L 80–99 | Kevin Johnson (18) | Antonio McDyess (19) | Steve Nash (5) | Alamodome; 27,528 | 1–3 |

1998 schedule

== Awards and honors ==
=== Week/Month ===
- Jason Kidd was named Player of the Week for games played March 8 through March 14.
- Jason Kidd was named Player of the Week for games played April 12 through April 18.

=== All-Star ===
- Jason Kidd was selected as a reserve for the Western Conference in the All-Star Game. It was his second All-Star selection. Kidd finished fifth in voting among Western Conference guards with 305,834 votes.

=== Season ===
- Danny Manning was awarded the Sixth Man of the Year Award.
- Jason Kidd finished in 13th place in MVP voting.

== Injuries/Missed games ==
- 10/28/97: George McCloud: Deep knee bruise; did not play
- 10/30/97: Loren Meyer: Lumbar spine surgery; placed on injured reserve for season
- 10/30/97: Tom Chambers; Strained lower back; placed on injured list until November 21
- 10/31/97: George McCloud: Concussion; did not play
- 11/20/97: Horacio Llamas: Strained lower back; placed on injured list until January 30
- 12/02/97: Kevin Johnson: Right knee tendinitis; out until December 11
- 12/09/97: George McCloud: Flu; did not play
- 12/09/97: Rex Chapman: Strained left hamstring; out until December 16
- 12/11/97: Kevin Johnson: Right knee tendinitis; placed on injured list until January 31
- 12/26/97: George McCloud: Thigh bruise; did not play
- 12/26/97: Brooks Thompson: Ill; did not play
- 12/29/97: Danny Manning: Abdominal strain; out until January 12
- 01/04/98: Jason Kidd: Sprained right ankle; left game
- 01/18/98: Hot Rod Williams; Flu, did not play
- 01/30/98: Cedric Ceballos: Strained right calf; placed on injured list until February 12
- 02/12/98: Horacio Llamas: Bruised left heel; placed on injured list until April 9
- 02/17/98: Rex Chapman: Sprained left ankle; did not play
- 02/22/98: Steve Nash: Did not play
- 03/05/98: Rex Chapman: Sore right foot; out until March 13
- 03/09/98: Antonio McDyess: Suspended one game for fighting Hakeem Olajuwon on March 7; did not play
- 03/13/98: Mark Bryant: Flu; out until March 17
- 03/25/98: Rex Chapman: Pulled right groin; out until April 4
- 04/06/98: Steve Nash: Did not play
- 04/09/98: Danny Manning: Injured right ACL; placed on injured list, out for season
- 04/18/98: Rex Chapman: Aggravated left hamstring; placed on injured reserve until April 23
- 04/23/98: Rex Chapman: Aggravated left hamstring; did not play
- 04/29/98: Rex Chapman: Aggravated left hamstring; did not play

== Player statistics ==
Legend
| GP | Games played | GS | Games started | MPG | Minutes per game |
| FG% | Field-goal percentage | 3P% | 3-point field-goal percentage | FT% | Free-throw percentage |
| RPG | Rebounds per game | APG | Assists per game | SPG | Steals per game |
| BPG | Blocks per game | PPG | Points per game |

=== Season ===
| Player | GP | GS | MPG | FG% | 3P% | FT% | RPG | APG | SPG | BPG | PPG |
|---|---|---|---|---|---|---|---|---|---|---|---|
| Mark Bryant | 70 | 22 | 15.9 | .484 | .000 | .768 | 3.5 | 0.7 | .5 | .2 | 4.2 |
| Cedric Ceballos* | 35 | 16 | 17.9 | .500 | .300 | .714 | 4.3 | 1.0 | .6 | .2 | 9.5 |
| Rex Chapman | 68 | 67 | 33.3 | .427 | .386 | .781 | 2.5 | 3.0 | 1.0 | .2 | 15.9 |
| Kevin Johnson | 50 | 12 | 25.8 | .447 | .154 | .871 | 3.3 | 4.9 | .5 | .2 | 9.5 |
| Jason Kidd | 82 | 82 | 38.0 | .416 | .313 | .799 | 6.2 | 9.1 | 2.0 | .3 | 11.6 |
| Horacio Llamas | 8 | 0 | 5.3 | .381 | .333 | .700 | 2.3 | 0.1 | .1 | .4 | 3.0 |
| Danny Manning | 70 | 11 | 25.6 | .516 | .000 | .739 | 5.6 | 2.0 | 1.0 | .7 | 13.5 |
| George McCloud | 63 | 13 | 19.3 | .405 | .341 | .765 | 3.5 | 1.3 | .9 | .2 | 7.2 |
| Antonio McDyess | 81 | 81 | 30.1 | .536† | .000 | .702 | 7.6 | 1.3 | 1.2 | 1.7 | 15.1 |
| Marko Milič | 33 | 0 | 4.9 | .609† | .500^ | .647 | 0.8 | 0.4 | .3 | .0 | 2.8 |
| Steve Nash | 76 | 9 | 21.9 | .459 | .415^ | .860 | 2.1 | 3.4 | .8 | .1 | 9.1 |
| Clifford Robinson | 80 | 64 | 29.5 | .479 | .321 | .689 | 5.1 | 2.1 | 1.2 | 1.1 | 14.2 |
| Dennis Scott* | 29 | 3 | 17.0 | .438 | .449^ | .667 | 1.7 | 0.8 | .3 | .2 | 6.2 |
| Brooks Thompson* | 13 | 0 | 3.5 | .370 | .313 | .333 | 0.4 | 0.2 | .3 | .0 | 2.0 |
| John Williams | 71 | 30 | 18.8 | .470 | . | .699 | 4.4 | 0.7 | .5 | .8 | 3.6 |

* – Stats with the Suns.
† – Minimum 300 field goals made.
^ – Minimum 55 three-pointers made.

=== Playoffs ===
| Player | GP | GS | MPG | FG% | 3P% | FT% | RPG | APG | SPG | BPG | PPG |
|---|---|---|---|---|---|---|---|---|---|---|---|
| Mike Brown | 1 | 0 | 1.0 | . | . | . | 0.0 | 0.0 | .0 | .0 | 0.0 |
| Mark Bryant | 4 | 1 | 23.3 | .500 | . | .500 | 5.8 | 0.3 | 1.0 | .5 | 10.0 |
| Rex Chapman | 2 | 2 | 29.0 | .261 | .000 | .857^ | 0.0 | 2.0 | 1.0 | .0 | 9.0 |
| Kevin Johnson | 4 | 1 | 30.5 | .548† | .250 | .667 | 2.3 | 4.8 | .5 | .2 | 13.8 |
| Jason Kidd | 4 | 4 | 42.8 | .379 | .000 | .813^ | 5.8 | 7.8 | 4.0 | .5 | 14.3 |
| George McCloud | 4 | 3 | 31.5 | .512 | .571 | .750 | 4.8 | 2.0 | .2 | .2 | 14.3 |
| Antonio McDyess | 4 | 4 | 36.8 | .477 | . | .643 | 13.3 | 1.0 | .5 | 1.5 | 17.8 |
| Marko Milič | 2 | 0 | 2.0 | .667† | . | . | 0.5 | 0.0 | .5 | .0 | 2.0 |
| Steve Nash | 4 | 1 | 12.8 | .444 | .200 | .625 | 2.5 | 1.8 | .5 | .0 | 5.5 |
| Clifford Robinson | 4 | 4 | 23.0 | .273 | .000 | .778 | 3.0 | 0.8 | .7 | .5 | 6.3 |
| Dennis Scott | 4 | 0 | 15.5 | .412 | .375 | . | 2.0 | 0.3 | .2 | .0 | 4.3 |
| John Williams | 3 | 0 | 11.0 | .286 | . | .667 | 1.3 | 0.3 | .0 | .7 | 2.0 |

† – Minimum 20 field goals made.
^ – Minimum 10 free throws made.

Player statistics citation:

== Transactions ==
=== Trades ===
| October 1, 1997 | To Denver Nuggets 1998 first-round draft pick ( (United States) Tyronn Lue) 1999 first-round draft pick ( (United States) James Posey) 2000 second-round draft pick ( (United States) Dan McClintock) 2001 first-round draft pick ( (United States) Joseph Forte) 2002 second-round draft pick ( (United States) Rod Grizzard) | To Phoenix Suns (United States) Antonio McDyess 2005 first-round draft pick ( (United States) Sean May) | To Cleveland Cavaliers (United States) Wesley Person (United States) Tony Dumas |
| November 21, 1997 | To Philadelphia 76ers (United States) Tom Chambers | To Phoenix Suns (Slovenia) Marko Milič |
| February 18, 1998 | To Dallas Mavericks (United States) Cedric Ceballos | To Phoenix Suns (United States) Dennis Scott |

=== Free agents ===
==== Additions ====
| Date | Player | Contract | Former Team |
|---|---|---|---|
| June 23, 1997 | Kevin Johnson | Signed one-year contract for $8,000,000 | Phoenix Suns |
| July 1, 1997 | Mark Bryant | Signed two-year contract for $4,300,000 | Phoenix Suns |
| July 8, 1997 | John "Hot Rod" Williams | Signed one-year contract for $4,550,000 | Phoenix Suns |
| July 8, 1997 | Rex Chapman | Signed one-year contract for $326,700 | Phoenix Suns |
| July 8, 1997 | Horacio Llamas | Signed one-year contract for $272,250 | Sioux Falls Skyforce |
| August 22, 1997 | Tom Chambers | Signed one-year contract for $272,250 | Charlotte Hornets |
| August 22, 1997 | William Cunningham | Undisclosed | n/a |
| August 25, 1997 | Clifford Robinson | Signed one-year contract for $1 million | Portland Trail Blazers |
| September 2, 1997 | George McCloud | Signed one-year contract for $272,250 | Los Angeles Lakers |
| December 11, 1997 | Brooks Thompson | Undisclosed | Denver Nuggets |
| January 9, 1998 | Brooks Thompson | Signed two 10-day contracts | Phoenix Suns |
| April 18, 1998 | Mike Brown | Signed for rest of season | Viola Reggio Calabria (Italy) |

==== Subtractions ====
| Date | Player | Reason left | New team |
|---|---|---|---|
| May 3, 1997 | Kevin Johnson | Retired | Phoenix Suns |
| July 1, 1997 | Wayman Tisdale | Free agent | n/a |
| July 1, 1997 | Mike Brown | Free agent | Viola Reggio Calabria (Italy) |
| September 29, 1997 | Ben Davis | Free agent | Miami Heat |
| October 13, 1997 | William Cunningham | Waived | Utah Jazz |
| October 30, 1997 | Stephen Jackson | Waived | La Crosse Bobcats (CBA) |
| January 7, 1998 | Brooks Thompson | Waived | Phoenix Suns |
| January 29, 1998 | Brooks Thompson | 10-day contract expired | New York Knicks |

Player transactions citation:
