= 1997–98 NBA season =

52nd NBA season

1997–98 NBA Season
- League: National Basketball Association
- Sport: Basketball
- Duration: October 31, 1997 – April 19, 1998; April 23 – May 31, 1998 (Playoffs); June 3 – 14, 1998 (Finals)
- Teams: 29
- TV partner(s): NBC, TBS, TNT

Draft
- Top draft pick: Tim Duncan
- Picked by: San Antonio Spurs

Regular season
- Top seed: Utah Jazz
- Season MVP: Michael Jordan (Chicago)
- Top scorer: Michael Jordan (Chicago)

Playoffs
- Eastern champions: Chicago Bulls
- Eastern runners-up: Indiana Pacers
- Western champions: Utah Jazz
- Western runners-up: Los Angeles Lakers

Finals
- Champions: Chicago Bulls
- Runners-up: Utah Jazz
- Finals MVP: Michael Jordan (Chicago)

NBA seasons
- ← 1996–97 1998–99 →

The 1997–98 NBA season was the 52nd season of the National Basketball Association (NBA). The season ended with the Chicago Bulls winning their third straight championship and sixth in the last eight years, beating the Utah Jazz 4 games to 2 in the 1998 NBA Finals. It also marked the temporary departure of Michael Jordan and the end of the dynasty for the Chicago Bulls.

This was the last time that both NBA and NHL regular seasons ended on the same day.

== Notable occurrences ==
Coaching changes
Offseason
Team	1996–97 coach	1997–98 coach
Boston Celtics	M. L. Carr	Rick Pitino
Denver Nuggets	Dick Motta	Bill Hanzlik
Golden State Warriors	Rick Adelman	P. J. Carlesimo
Indiana Pacers	Larry Brown	Larry Bird
Orlando Magic	Richie Adubato	Chuck Daly
Philadelphia 76ers	Johnny Davis	Larry Brown
Portland Trail Blazers	P. J. Carlesimo	Mike Dunleavy Sr.
Vancouver Grizzlies	Stu Jackson	Brian Hill
In-season
Team	Outgoing coach	Incoming coach
Dallas Mavericks	Jim Cleamons	Don Nelson
Detroit Pistons	Doug Collins	Alvin Gentry
Toronto Raptors	Darrell Walker	Butch Carter

- The 1998 NBA All-Star Game was played at Madison Square Garden. However, the Slam Dunk Contest was not held, due to the risk of player injuries, lack of new dunking tricks and lack of big-name players in recent competitions. Instead, a 2Ball competition was held. Los Angeles Lakers guard Kobe Bryant became the youngest All-Star starter at age 19. The East beat the West, 135–114 for the third consecutive year, as Michael Jordan won his third All-Star MVP.
- The Washington Bullets were renamed the "Wizards". They began the season at US Airways Arena, then in December, they played their first game at the MCI Center (later Verizon Center, now Capital One Arena) during this season.
- Due to the demolition of The Omni and the construction of the new Philips Arena, the Atlanta Hawks split home games between Georgia Tech's Alexander Coliseum (Their original home where they played for four seasons when they moved to Atlanta in 1968.) and the Georgia Dome.
- Golden State Warriors swingman Latrell Sprewell made headlines by choking Warriors head coach P. J. Carlesimo during practice on December 1, 1997. Sprewell was ultimately suspended for 68 games, at the time the longest in NBA history. Sprewell would be traded to the New York Knicks in the off-season that followed.
- Michael Jordan passed Kareem Abdul-Jabbar as the all-time leader in points scored in the NBA Playoffs. The record stood for nearly 20 years until it was broken by LeBron James in 2017.
- The Utah Jazz and the Chicago Bulls shared the league's best record at 62–20, and met each other in the NBA Finals. The Jazz had home-court advantage by virtue of the head-to-head match-up (the Jazz won the season series 2–0).
- Two new records were set in Game 3 of the NBA Finals: biggest margin of victory (42 points) and fewest points scored in an NBA Finals game (54) in the Bulls' rout of the Jazz.
- The San Antonio Spurs set a league record for the biggest single-season turnaround (36 wins), breaking their own record set in the 1989–90 NBA season; it was later broken by the 2007–08 Boston Celtics.
- Following head coach Phil Jackson's decision to not return to the Bulls, Michael Jordan announced his second retirement from the NBA during the following offseason. This was Jordan's final season with the Chicago Bulls. Scottie Pippen was traded for Roy Rogers (who was released in February 1999) and a conditional second-round draft pick from the Houston Rockets. Dennis Rodman was not re-signed either, leading to the end of an era for the Bulls and the NBA.
- Houston Rockets guard Clyde Drexler retired after fifteen seasons, twelve of which he spent with the Portland Trail Blazers, where he led the team to two NBA Finals, in 1990 and 1992. He won his only NBA championship in 1995 while playing for the Rockets.
- Dallas Mavericks forward A.C. Green breaks the NBA's Iron Man Streak of most consecutive games played, surpassing Randy Smith who played 906 consecutive games.
- The restricted area arc known as the no charge zone was allowed.
- The NBA reverted the three point field goal line back to 23 ft 9 inch from a uniform 22 ft beginning in 1994–95 season
- On February 27, the Indiana Pacers defeated the Portland Trail Blazers 124–59, marking the first time in NBA history that one team scored more than twice as many points as its opponent.
- Nike became the official outfitter for select NBA teams (Boston Celtics, Chicago Bulls, Dallas Mavericks, Detroit Pistons, Los Angeles Lakers, Miami Heat, Portland Trail Blazers, San Antonio Spurs, Toronto Raptors and Washington Wizards), which ran for seven years. Other NBA teams were outfitted by Starter Clothing Line, Puma, Reebok or Champion.
- The Denver Nuggets lost 71 games, joining the 1972–73 Philadelphia 76ers, 1986–87 Los Angeles Clippers, and 1992–93 Dallas Mavericks (plus subsequently the 2009–10 Nets and 2015–16 76ers) as the only teams to lose 70 games in a season. The Nuggets also equaled the longest single-season losing streak with 23 consecutive losses, sharing the mark with the 1995–96 Vancouver Grizzlies.
- All the Western Conference teams who missed the playoffs had 55 or more losses. Four of them lost more than 62 games. The ninth-placed Sacramento Kings finished the season with a 27–55 record, losing twenty six of their last twenty nine games. The Kings finished fourteen games behind the #8 seeded Houston Rockets, who finished with a 41–41 record, while the tenth-placed Dallas Mavericks ended with a 20–62 record. All the Eastern Conference teams who missed the playoffs had 31 or more wins except for the Toronto Raptors, who finished with a 16–66 record.
- Violet Palmer and Dee Kantner became the first two female officials in NBA history (as well as any of the four major professional sports leagues). Kantner would be fired following the 2001–02 season, while Palmer would go on to have long 19-year career before retiring after the 2015–16 season.

== 1997–98 NBA changes ==
- The Atlanta Hawks split their home games playing in the Alexander Memorial Coliseum and the Georgia Dome, due to the demolition of The Omni.
- The Charlotte Hornets changed their uniforms adding teal (home), and purple (road) to the side panels to their jerseys and shorts.
- The Chicago Bulls removed the pinstripes from their black alternate uniforms.
- The Cleveland Cavaliers slightly changed their uniforms.
- The Golden State Warriors changed their logo and uniforms, changing their colors to navy, orange and gold.
- The Indiana Pacers changed their uniforms adding pinstripes with side panels to their jerseys and shorts.
- The New Jersey Nets changed their logo and uniforms, replacing blue with navy to go with red and grey to their color scheme, added side panels to their jerseys and shorts.
- The New York Knicks changed their home uniforms, adding blue side panels to their jerseys and shorts. Meanwhile, the blue alternate road uniforms with black side panels to their jerseys and shorts they wore for the past two seasons became their primary road jersey.
- The Philadelphia 76ers changed their logo and uniforms, replacing their red, white and blue colors with black and gold.
- The Vancouver Grizzlies added new black road alternate uniforms.
- The Washington Bullets changed their name to the Washington Wizards, and got a new logo and new uniforms. They scrap the red, white and blue colors to blue, old gold and black. Also in December that season, they moved into their new home arena called the MCI Center (later the Verizon Center, now Capital One Arena).

== Final standings ==
=== By division ===
Eastern Conference

Atlantic Division	W	L	PCT	GB	Home	Road	Div
y-Miami Heat	55	27	.671	–	30-11	25–16	18–6
x-New York Knicks	43	39	.524	12	28–13	15–26	13–11
x-New Jersey Nets	43	39	.524	12	26–15	17–24	12–12
Washington Wizards	42	40	.512	13	24–17	18–23	12–13
Orlando Magic	41	41	.500	14	24–17	17–24	11–13
Boston Celtics	36	46	.439	19	24–17	12–29	12–12
Philadelphia 76ers	31	51	.378	24	19–22	12–29	7–17

Central Division	W	L	PCT	GB	Home	Road	Div
y-Chicago Bulls	62	20	.756	–	37–4	25–16	21–7
x-Indiana Pacers	58	24	.707	4	32–9	26–15	19–9
x-Charlotte Hornets	51	31	.622	11	32–9	19–22	16–12
x-Atlanta Hawks	50	32	.610	12	29–12	21–20	19–9
x-Cleveland Cavaliers	47	35	.573	15	27–14	20–21	14–14
Detroit Pistons	37	45	.451	25	25–16	12–29	12–16
Milwaukee Bucks	36	46	.439	26	21–20	15–26	9–19
Toronto Raptors	16	66	.195	46	9–32	7–34	2–26

Western Conference

Midwest Division	W	L	PCT	GB	Home	Road	Div
z-Utah Jazz	62	20	.756	–	36–5	26–15	22–2
x-San Antonio Spurs	56	26	.683	6	31–10	25–16	18–6
x-Minnesota Timberwolves	45	37	.549	17	26–15	19–22	14–10
x-Houston Rockets	41	41	.500	21	24–17	17–24	14–10
Dallas Mavericks	20	62	.244	42	13–28	7–34	9–15
Vancouver Grizzlies	19	63	.232	43	14–27	5–36	4–20
Denver Nuggets	11	71	.134	51	9–32	2–39	3–21

Pacific Division	W	L	PCT	GB	Home	Road	Div
y-Seattle SuperSonics	61	21	.744	–	35–6	26–15	19–5
x-Los Angeles Lakers	61	21	.744	–	33–8	28–13	16–8
x-Phoenix Suns	56	26	.683	5	30–11	26–15	17–7
x-Portland Trail Blazers	46	36	.561	15	26–15	20–21	14–10
Sacramento Kings	27	55	.329	34	21–20	6–35	6–18
Golden State Warriors	19	63	.232	42	12–29	7–34	6–18
Los Angeles Clippers	17	65	.207	44	11–30	6–35	6–18

=== By conference ===
#	Eastern Conference				
#	Team	W	L	PCT	GB
1	c-Chicago Bulls	62	20	.756	–
2	y-Miami Heat	55	27	.671	7
3	x-Indiana Pacers	58	24	.707	4
4	x-Charlotte Hornets	51	31	.622	11
5	x-Atlanta Hawks	50	32	.610	12
6	x-Cleveland Cavaliers	47	35	.573	15
7	x-New York Knicks	43	39	.524	19
8	x-New Jersey Nets	43	39	.524	19
9	Washington Wizards	42	40	.512	20
10	Orlando Magic	41	41	.500	21
11	Detroit Pistons	37	45	.451	25
12	Boston Celtics	36	46	.439	26
13	Milwaukee Bucks	36	46	.439	26
14	Philadelphia 76ers	31	51	.378	31
15	Toronto Raptors	16	66	.195	46

#	Western Conference				
#	Team	W	L	PCT	GB
1	z-Utah Jazz	62	20	.756	–
2	y-Seattle SuperSonics	61	21	.744	1
3	x-Los Angeles Lakers	61	21	.744	1
4	x-Phoenix Suns	56	26	.683	6
5	x-San Antonio Spurs	56	26	.683	6
6	x-Portland Trail Blazers	46	36	.561	16
7	x-Minnesota Timberwolves	45	37	.549	17
8	x-Houston Rockets	41	41	.500	21
9	Sacramento Kings	27	55	.329	35
10	Dallas Mavericks	20	62	.244	42
11	Vancouver Grizzlies	19	63	.232	43
12	Golden State Warriors	19	63	.232	43
13	Los Angeles Clippers	17	65	.207	45
14	Denver Nuggets	11	71	.134	51

Notes

- z – Clinched home court advantage for the entire playoffs
- c – Clinched home court advantage for the conference playoffs
- y – Clinched division title
- x – Clinched playoff spot

== Playoffs ==
Teams in bold advanced to the next round. The numbers to the left of each team indicate the team's seeding in its conference, and the numbers to the right indicate the number of games the team won in that round. The division champions are marked by an asterisk. Home court advantage does not necessarily belong to the higher-seeded team, but instead the team with the better regular season record; teams enjoying the home advantage are shown in italics.

First Round	Conference Semifinals
**E1**	**Chicago***	**3**
E8	New Jersey	0
**E1**	**Chicago***	**4**
E4	Charlotte	1
**E4**	**Charlotte**	**3**
E5	Atlanta	1
**Eastern Conference**
**E3**	**Indiana**	**3**
E6	Cleveland	1
**E3**	**Indiana**	**4**
E7	New York	1
E2	Miami*	2
**E7**	**New York**	**3**
**W1**	**Utah***	**3**
W8	Houston	2
**W1**	**Utah***	**4**
W5	San Antonio	1
W4	Phoenix	1
**W5**	**San Antonio**	**3**
**Western Conference**
**W3**	**LA Lakers**	**3**
W6	Portland	1
**W3**	**LA Lakers**	**4**
W2	Seattle*	1
**W2**	**Seattle***	**3**
W7	Minnesota	2

Conference Finals
**E1**	**Chicago***	**4**
E3	Indiana	3
**W1**	**Utah***	**4**
W3	LA Lakers	0

NBA Finals
**E1**	**Chicago***	**4**
W1	Utah*	2

- * Division winner
- **Bold** Series winner
- Italic Team with home-court advantage

== Statistics leaders ==
Category	Player	Team	Stat
Points per game	Michael Jordan	Chicago Bulls	28.7
Rebounds per game	Dennis Rodman	Chicago Bulls	15.0
Assists per game	Rod Strickland	Washington Wizards	10.5
Steals per game	Mookie Blaylock	Atlanta Hawks	2.61
Blocks per game	Marcus Camby	Toronto Raptors	3.65
FG%	Shaquille O'Neal	Los Angeles Lakers	.584
FT%	Chris Mullin	Indiana Pacers	.939
3FG%	Dale Ellis	Seattle SuperSonics	.464

== NBA awards ==
=== Yearly awards ===
- Most Valuable Player: Michael Jordan, Chicago Bulls
- Rookie of the Year: Tim Duncan, San Antonio Spurs
- Defensive Player of the Year: Dikembe Mutombo, Atlanta Hawks
- Sixth Man of the Year: Danny Manning, Phoenix Suns
- Most Improved Player: Alan Henderson, Atlanta Hawks
- Coach of the Year: Larry Bird, Indiana Pacers

- All-NBA First Team:
  - F – Tim Duncan, San Antonio Spurs
  - F – Karl Malone, Utah Jazz
  - C – Shaquille O'Neal, Los Angeles Lakers
  - G – Michael Jordan, Chicago Bulls
  - G – Gary Payton, Seattle SuperSonics
- All-NBA Second Team:
  - F – Vin Baker, Seattle SuperSonics
  - F – Grant Hill, Detroit Pistons
  - C – David Robinson, San Antonio Spurs
  - G – Tim Hardaway, Miami Heat
  - G – Rod Strickland, Washington Wizards
- All-NBA Third Team:
  - F – Scottie Pippen, Chicago Bulls
  - F – Glen Rice, Charlotte Hornets
  - C – Dikembe Mutombo, Atlanta Hawks
  - G – Mitch Richmond, Sacramento Kings
  - G – Reggie Miller, Indiana Pacers

- NBA All-Defensive First Team:
  - F – Scottie Pippen, Chicago Bulls
  - F – Karl Malone, Utah Jazz
  - C – Dikembe Mutombo, Atlanta Hawks
  - G – Gary Payton, Seattle SuperSonics
  - G – Michael Jordan, Chicago Bulls
- NBA All-Defensive Second Team:
  - F – Charles Oakley, New York Knicks
  - F – Tim Duncan, San Antonio Spurs
  - C – David Robinson, San Antonio Spurs
  - G – Eddie Jones, Los Angeles Lakers
  - G – Mookie Blaylock, Atlanta Hawks

- All-NBA Rookie First Team:
  - Tim Duncan, San Antonio Spurs
  - Keith Van Horn, New Jersey Nets
  - Zydrunas Ilgauskas, Cleveland Cavaliers
  - Ron Mercer, Boston Celtics
  - Brevin Knight, Cleveland Cavaliers
- All-NBA Rookie Second Team:
  - Maurice Taylor, Los Angeles Clippers
  - Cedric Henderson, Cleveland Cavaliers
  - Tim Thomas, Philadelphia 76ers
  - Bobby Jackson, Denver Nuggets
  - Derek Anderson, Cleveland Cavaliers

=== Player of the week ===
The following players were named NBA Player of the Week.

Week	Player
Oct. 31 – Nov. 8	Dikembe Mutombo (Atlanta Hawks)
Nov. 9 – Nov. 15	Shaquille O'Neal (Los Angeles Lakers)
Nov. 16 – Nov. 22	Michael Jordan (Chicago Bulls)
Nov. 23 – Nov. 29	Karl Malone (Utah Jazz)
Nov. 30 – Dec. 6	Wesley Person (Cleveland Cavaliers)
Dec. 7 – Dec. 13	Glen Rice (Charlotte Hornets)
Dec. 14 – Dec. 20	Michael Jordan (Chicago Bulls)
Dec. 21 – Dec. 27	David Robinson (San Antonio Spurs)
Dec. 28 – Jan. 3	Rik Smits (Indiana Pacers)
Jan. 4 – Jan. 10	Steve Smith (Atlanta Hawks)
Jan. 11 – Jan. 17	Allen Iverson (Philadelphia 76ers)
Jan. 18 – Jan. 24	Jayson Williams (New Jersey Nets)
Jan. 25 – Jan. 31	David Robinson (San Antonio Spurs)
Feb. 10 – Feb. 14	Karl Malone (Utah Jazz)
Feb. 15 – Feb. 21	Nick Anderson (Orlando Magic)
Feb. 22 – Feb. 28	Tim Duncan (San Antonio Spurs)
Mar. 1 – Mar. 7	Karl Malone (Utah Jazz)
Mar. 8 – Mar. 14	Jason Kidd (Phoenix Suns)
Mar. 15 – Mar. 21	Shaquille O'Neal (Los Angeles Lakers)
Mar. 22 – Mar. 28	Alonzo Mourning (Miami Heat)
Mar. 29 – Apr. 4	Michael Jordan (Chicago Bulls)
Apr. 5 – Apr. 11	Sam Cassell (New Jersey Nets)
Apr. 12 – Apr. 18	Jason Kidd (Phoenix Suns)

=== Player of the month ===
The following players were named NBA Player of the Month.

Month	Player
November	Eddie Jones (Los Angeles Lakers)
December	Michael Jordan (Chicago Bulls)
January	Shaquille O'Neal (Los Angeles Lakers)
February	Karl Malone (Utah Jazz)
March	Michael Jordan (Chicago Bulls)
April	Shaquille O'Neal (Los Angeles Lakers)

=== Rookie of the month ===
The following players were named NBA Rookie of the Month.

Month	Rookie
November	Tim Duncan (San Antonio Spurs)
December	Tim Duncan (San Antonio Spurs)
January	Tim Duncan (San Antonio Spurs)
February	Tim Duncan (San Antonio Spurs)
March	Tim Duncan (San Antonio Spurs)
April	Tim Duncan (San Antonio Spurs)

=== Coach of the month ===
The following coaches were named NBA Coach of the Month.

Month	Coach
November	Lenny Wilkens (Atlanta Hawks)
December	George Karl (Seattle SuperSonics)
January	Larry Bird (Indiana Pacers)
February	Pat Riley (Miami Heat)
March	Jerry Sloan (Utah Jazz)
April	Del Harris (Los Angeles Lakers)

== See also ==
- List of NBA regular season records
