= Minnesota Timberwolves draft history =

Overview of Minnesota Timberwolves draft picks

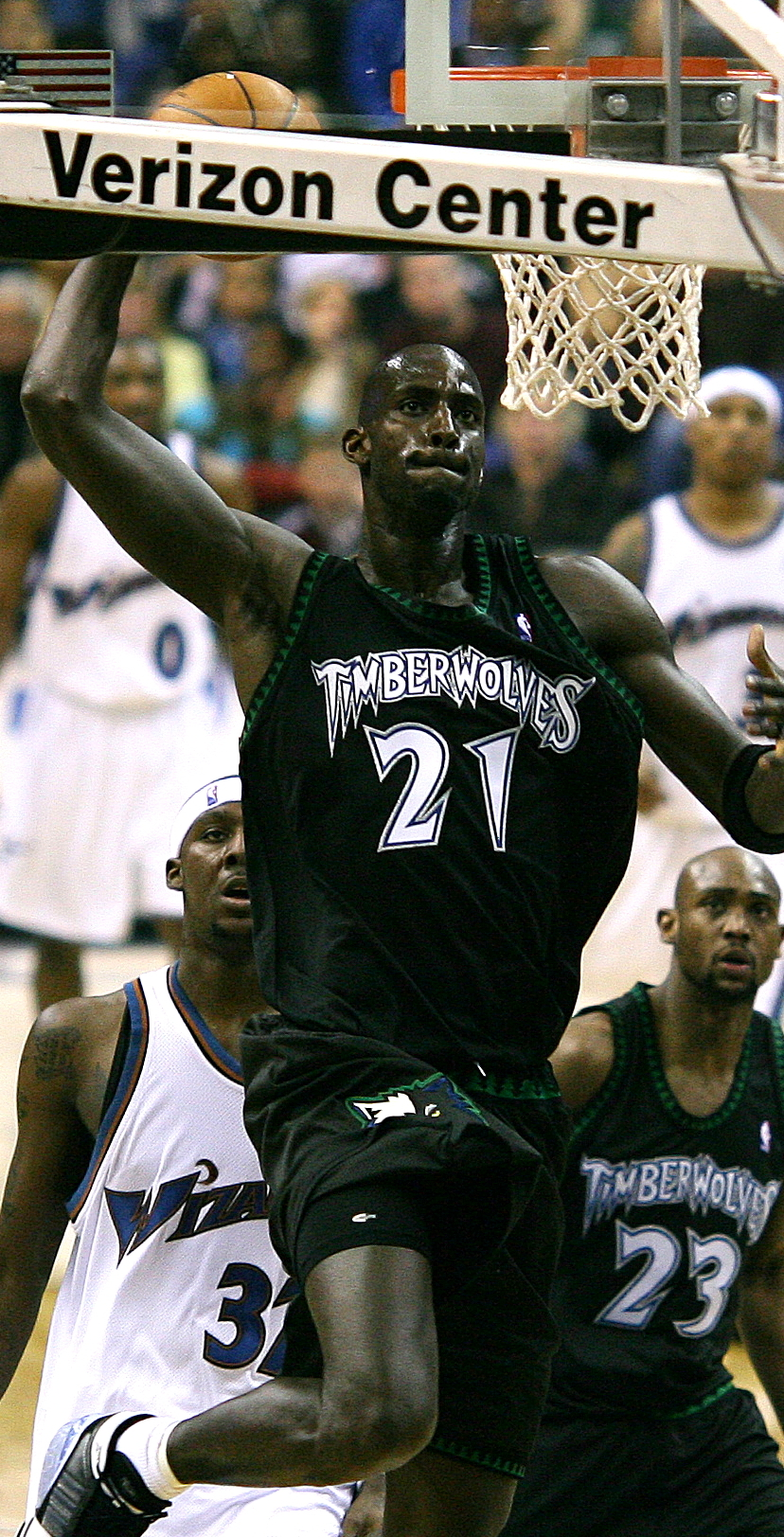
Kevin Garnett was drafted fifth overall by the Minnesota Timberwolves in 1995.

The Minnesota Timberwolves first participated in the National Basketball Association (NBA) Draft on June 27, 1989, about five months before their inaugural NBA season. The Timberwolves are currently the second NBA team to be based in Minneapolis since the Minneapolis Lakers were there from 1948 to 1960.

Before each draft, an NBA draft lottery determines the first round selection order for the teams that did not make the playoffs during the prior season. Teams can also trade their picks, which means that a team could have more than or less than two picks in one draft. As a result of the various trades, the Minnesota Timberwolves had four draft picks in 1992 and 2006. The Timberwolves drafted Pooh Richardson with their first ever draft pick, tenth overall, in the 1989 NBA draft. In 1995, the Timberwolves picked Kevin Garnett fifth overall, who went on to be a 15-time All-Star. In 1996, the Timberwolves drafted Ray Allen fifth overall but was traded to the Milwaukee Bucks with a future first-round pick for the draft rights of Stephon Marbury. In the 2008 NBA draft, the Timberwolves drafted O. J. Mayo third overall but was traded to the Memphis Grizzlies along with three other players from the Timberwolves for the draft rights to Kevin Love along with three other players from the Grizzlies. The Timberwolves have landed the first overall pick twice in franchise history, selecting Karl-Anthony Towns in the 2015 NBA draft and Anthony Edwards in the 2020 NBA draft.

== Key ==
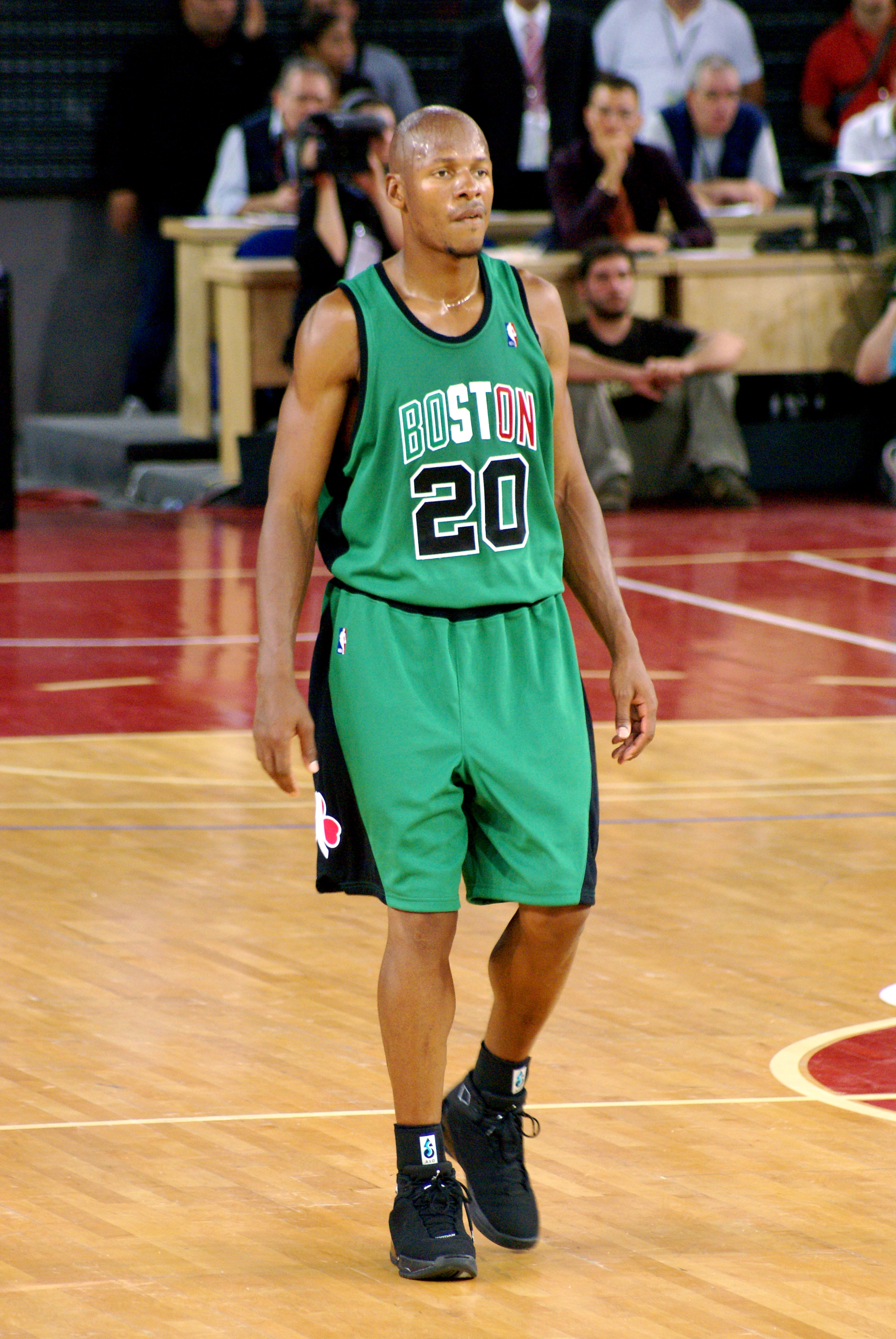
Ray Allen was drafted fifth overall in 1996 but was later traded

Abbreviation	Meaning	Abbreviation	Meaning
Nat	Nationality	Pos	Position
G	Guard	PG	Point guard
SG	Shooting guard	F	Forward
SF	Small forward	PF	Power forward
C	Center		

Naismith Basketball Hall of Famer	First overall NBA draft pick	Selected for an NBA All-Star Game

== Selections ==
Draft	Round	Pick	Player	Nationality	Position	College/High School/Club
1989	1	10	Pooh Richardson	United States	PG	UCLA
1989	2	34	Gary Leonard (from Milwaukee)^{[a]}	United States	C	Missouri
1989	2	38	Doug West	United States	SG/SF	Villanova
1990	1	6	Felton Spencer	United States	C	Louisville
1990	1	20	Gerald Glass (from Philadelphia)^{[b]}	United States	SG/SF	Mississippi
1991	1	7	Luc Longley	Australia	C	New Mexico
1991	2	34	Myron Brown	United States	G	Slippery Rock
1992	1	3	Christian Laettner	United States	PF/C	Duke
1992	2	28	Marlon Maxey	United States	F	UTEP
1992	2	34	Chris Smith (from Milwaukee)^{[c]}	United States	G	Connecticut
1992	2	51	Tim Burroughs (from Utah)^{[d]}	United States	PF	Jacksonville
1993	1	5	Isaiah Rider	United States	SG/SF	UNLV
1993	2	29	Sherron Mills (from Detroit)^{[e]}	United States	F	Virginia Commonwealth
1994	1	4	Donyell Marshall	United States	F	Connecticut
1994	2	30	Howard Eisley	United States	G	Boston College
1995	1	5	Kevin Garnett	United States	PF/C	Farragut Academy (HS)
1995	2	48	Mark Davis	United States	SG/SF	Texas Tech
1995	2	49	Jerome Allen	United States	G	Pennsylvania
1996	1	5	Ray Allen (traded to Milwaukee)^{[f]}	United States	SG	Connecticut
1997	1	20	Paul Grant (from Portland)^{[g]}	United States	C	Wisconsin
1997	2	43	Gordon Malone	United States	PF	West Virginia
1998	1	17	Rasho Nesterović	Slovenia	C	Kinder Bologna (Italy)
1998	2	46	Andrae Patterson	United States	F	Indiana
1999	1	6	Wally Szczerbiak (from New Jersey)^{[h]}	United States	F	Miami (OH)
1999	1	14	William Avery	United States	G	Duke
1999	2	42	Louis Bullock	United States	SG	Michigan
2000	2	51	Igor Rakočević	FR Yugoslavia (now Serbia)	G	Red Star Belgrade (Yugoslavia)
2001	2	45	Loren Woods	Lebanon	PF/C	Arizona
2002	2	51	Marcus Taylor	United States	PG	Michigan State
2003	1	26	Ndudi Ebi	United Kingdom	SF	Westbury Christian (HS)
2003	2	55	Rick Rickert	United States	PF	Minnesota
2004	2	58	Blake Stepp	United States	PG	Gonzaga
2005	1	14	Rashad McCants	United States	SG	North Carolina
2005	2	34	Bracey Wright	United States	G	Indiana
2006	1	6	Brandon Roy (traded to Portland)^{[i]}	United States	SG	Washington
2006	2	36	Craig Smith	United States	F	Boston College
2006	2	37	Bobby Jones (traded to Philadelphia)^{[j]}	United States	F	Washington
2006	2	57	Loukas Mavrokefalidis (from Phoenix)^{[k]}	Greece	F/C	PAOK (Greece)
2007	1	7	Corey Brewer	United States	SG	Florida
2007	2	41	Chris Richard (from Philadelphia)^{[j]}	United States	F	Florida
2008	1	3	O. J. Mayo (traded to Memphis)^{[l]}	United States	SG	USC
2008	2	31	Nikola Peković (from Miami via Boston)^{[m]}	Montenegro	C	KK Partizan (Serbia and Adriatic League)
2008	2	34	Mario Chalmers (traded to Miami)^{[n]}	United States	PG	Kansas
2009	1	5	Ricky Rubio (from Washington)^{[o]}	Spain	PG	DKV Joventut (Spain)
2009	1	6	Jonny Flynn	United States	PG	Syracuse
2009	1	18	Ty Lawson (from Miami) (traded to Denver)^{[p]}	United States	PG	North Carolina
2009	1	28	Wayne Ellington (from Boston)^{[q]}	United States	SG	North Carolina
2009	2	45	Nick Calathes (from Philadelphia via Miami)^{[r]}	United States	PG	Florida
2009	2	47	Henk Norel (from Miami)^{[s]}	Netherlands	PF	DKV Joventut (Spain)
2010	1	4	Wesley Johnson	United States	SF	Syracuse
2010	1	30	Lazar Hayward	United States	SF	Marquette
2011	1	2	Derrick Williams	United States	SF	Arizona
2012	2	58	Robbie Hummel (from Oklahoma City)^{[t]}	United States	PF	Purdue
2013	1	9	Trey Burke (traded to Utah)^{[u]}	United States	PG	Michigan
2013	1	26	André Roberson (from Memphis via Houston Rockets,^{[v]} traded to Oklahoma City via Golden State)^{[w]}	United States	SG	Colorado
2013	2	52	Lorenzo Brown (from Brooklyn via Minnesota and New Orleans)^{[x]}	United States	PG	NC State
2013	2	59	Bojan Dubljević (from Oklahoma City)^{[t]}	Montenegro	PF	Valencia Basket (Spain)
2014	1	13	Zach LaVine	United States	SG	UCLA
2014	2	40	Glenn Robinson III (from New Orleans)^{[y]}	United States	SF	Michigan
2014	2	44	Markel Brown (traded to Brooklyn)^{[z]}	United States	SG	Oklahoma State
2014	2	53	Alessandro Gentile (from Golden State^{[w]}, traded to Houston)^{[aa]}	Italy	SF	Olimpia Milano (Italy)
2015	1	1	Karl-Anthony Towns	Dominican Republic; United States	C	Kentucky
2015	2	31	Cedi Osman (traded to Cleveland)^{[ab]}	Turkey	SG/SF	Anadolu Efes (Turkey)
2015	2	36	Rakeem Christmas (from Sacramento via Houston^{[ac]}, traded to Cleveland)^{[ab]}	United States	PF/C	Syracuse
2016	1	5	Kris Dunn	United States	PG	Providence
2017	1	7	Lauri Markkanen (traded to Chicago Bulls)^{[ad]}	Finland	PF	Arizona
2018	1	20	Josh Okogie (from Oklahoma City via Utah)^{[ae]}	Nigeria; United States	SG	Georgia Tech
2018	2	48	Keita Bates-Diop	United States	SF	Ohio State
2019	1	6	Jarrett Culver	United States	G	Texas Tech
2020	1	1	Anthony Edwards	United States	G	Georgia
2020	1	17	Aleksej Pokuševski (from Brooklyn via Atlanta, traded to Oklahoma City)	Serbia	F	Olympiacos (Greece)
2020	2	33	Daniel Oturu (traded to L. A. Clippers)	United States	C	Minnesota
2022	1	19	Jake LaRavia (traded to Memphis Grizzlies)^{[af]}	United States	PF	Wake Forest
2022	2	40	Bryce McGowens (traded to Charlotte Hornets)^{[ag]}	United States	SG	Nebraska
2022	2	48	Kendall Brown (traded to Indiana Pacers)^{[ah]}	United States	SG	Baylor
2022	2	50	Matteo Spagnolo	Italy	G	Vanoli Cremona (Italy)
2023	2	53	Jaylen Clark	United States	G	UCLA
2024	1	27	Terrence Shannon Jr.	United States	SG	Illinois
2024	2	37	Bobi Klintman	Sweden	SF/PF	
2025	1	17	Joan Beringer	France	C	
2025	2	31	Rasheer Fleming	United States	PF	

== Notes ==
- ^{a} The Minnesota Timberwolves acquired a second-round draft pick (Gary Leonard) from the Milwaukee Bucks for agreeing to select Mark Davis in the 1989 NBA Expansion Draft.
- ^{b} The Minnesota Timberwolves trade Rick Mahorn to the Philadelphia 76ers for a 1990 first-round (Gerald Glass) and a second-round draft pick, a 1991 second-round draft pick and a conditional 1992 second-round draft pick.
- ^{c} The Minnesota Timberwolves traded Brad Lohaus to the Milwaukee Bucks for Randy Breuer and a conditional one-time exchange of a second-round draft pick in 1992 (Chris Smith).
- ^{d} The Minnesota Timberwolves traded Tyrone Corbin to the Utah Jazz for Thurl Bailey and a 1992 second-round draft pick (Tim Burroughs).
- ^{e} The Minnesota Timberwolves traded Gerald Glass and Mark Randall to the Detroit Pistons for Lance Blanks, Brad Sellers and a future second-round draft pick (Sherron Mills).
- ^{f} The Milwaukee Bucks traded the draft rights of Stephon Marbury to the Minnesota Timberwolves for Ray Allen and a future first-round pick.
- ^{g} The Minnesota Timberwolves traded Isaiah Rider to the Portland Trail Blazers for James Robinson, Bill Curley and a first-round draft pick in 1997 or 1998 (became the 20th pick in the 1997 draft on June 23, 1997) (Paul Grant).
- ^{h} The Minnesota Timberwolves traded Stephon Marbury, Chris Carr and Bill Curley to the New Jersey Nets and Paul Grant to the Milwaukee Bucks in a three-team deal. The Minnesota Timberwolves acquired Terrell Brandon from the Milwaukee Bucks, and Brian Evans and future considerations from the Nets (turned out to be first-round draft pickin 1999 NBA Draft) (Wally Szczcerbiak).
- ^{i} The Minnesota Timberwolves acquired the draft rights to Randy Foye from the Portland Trail Blazers for the draft rights to Brandon Roy.
- ^{j 1} ^{2} The Philadelphia 76ers acquired the draft rights to Bobby Jones from the Minnesota Timberwolves for a future second-round pick (Chris Richard) and cash considerations.
- ^{k} The Phoenix Suns acquired Nikoloz Tskitishvili from the Minnesota Timberwolves in exchange for a 2006 second-round draft pick (Loukas Mavrokefalidis).
- ^{l} The Memphis Grizzlies acquired the draft rights to O. J. Mayo along with Marko Jarić, Antoine Walker, and Greg Buckner from the Minnesota Timberwolves in exchange for the draft rights to Kevin Love along with Mike Miller, Brian Cardinal, and Jason Collins.
- ^{m} The Minnesota Timberwolves received a second-round draft pick (Nikola Peković) from the Miami Heat in a trade involving Antoine Walker via the Boston Celtics in a trade involving Ricky Davis.
- ^{n} The Miami Heat acquired the draft rights to Mario Chalmers from the Minnesota Timberwolves in exchange for two future second-round picks and cash considerations.
- ^{o} On June 24, 2009, Minnesota acquired the 5th pick, Etan Thomas, Darius Songaila and Oleksiy Pecherov from Washington in exchange for Randy Foye and Mike Miller. Minnesota used the 5th pick to draft Ricky Rubio.
- ^{p} On October 24, 2007, Minnesota acquired a 2009 first-round draft pick, Antoine Walker, Wayne Simien, Michael Doleac and cash considerations from Miami in exchange for Ricky Davis and Mark Blount. Minnesota used the 18th pick to draft Ty Lawson.
- ^{q} On July 31, 2007, Minnesota re-acquired their 2009 first-round draft pick along with Al Jefferson, Gerald Green, Ryan Gomes, Sebastian Telfair, Theo Ratliff, a 2009 first-round draft pick and cash considerations from Boston in exchange for Kevin Garnett. Previously, Boston acquired a 2009 first round draft pick, Wally Szczerbiak, Michael Olowokandi and Dwayne Jones on January 26, 2006, from Minnesota in exchange for Ricky Davis, Marcus Banks, Mark Blount, Justin Reed and two second-round draft picks. Minnesota used the 28th pick to draft Wayne Ellington.
- ^{r} ^{s} On June 26, 2008, Minnesota acquired Philadelphia's and Miami's 2009 second-round draft picks and cash considerations from Miami in exchange for the draft rights to Mario Chalmers. Previously, Miami acquired a 2009 second-round draft pick, the draft rights to Daequan Cook and cash considerations on June 28, 2007, from Philadelphia in exchange for the draft rights to Jason Smith. Minnesota used the 45th and 47th pick to draft Nick Calathes and Henk Norel respectively. Later, on June 26, 2009. the Dallas Mavericks acquired the draft rights to 45th pick Nick Calathes from Minnesota in exchange for a 2010 second-round draft pick and cash considerations.
- ^{t 1} ^{2} On December 13, 2011, the Minnesota Timberwolves acquired Robert Vaden, a 2012 second-round draft pick (the 58th pick) and a future conditional second-round draft pick from the Oklahoma City Thunder in exchange for Lazar Hayward.
- ^{u} On June 27, 2013, the Minnesota Timberwolves traded 9th pick Trey Burke to the Utah Jazz in exchange for the 14th pick Shabazz Muhammad and the 21st pick Gorgui Dieng.
- ^{v} On June 23, 2011, the Minnesota Timberwolves acquired Brad Miller, rights to Nikola Mirotić and Chandler Parsons and a 2013 first round pick (the 26th pick) from the Houston Rockets in exchange for Jonny Flynn, rights to Donatas Motiejūnas and a 2012 second-round pick. Previously, on February 24, 2011, the Rockets acquired Hasheem Thabeet, DeMarre Carroll and a 2013 first-round draft pick from Memphis in exchange for Shane Battier and Ish Smith.
- ^{w 1} ^{2} The Minnesota Timberwolves traded 26th pick Andre Roberson and Malcolm Lee to the Golden State Warriors in exchange for a 2014 second-round pick (the 53rd pick) and cash. Golden State then traded Roberson to the Oklahoma City Thunder in exchange for the 29th pick (Archie Goodwin) and cash.
- ^{x} On June 23, 2011, the Minnesota Timberwolves acquired a 2013 second round pick (the 52nd pick) from the New Jersey Nets in exchange for the draft rights to Bojan Bogdanović.
- ^{y} On September 9, 2009, Minnesota acquired Antonio Daniels and a 2014 second-round pick (the 40th pick) from New Orleans in exchange for Bobby Brown and Darius Songaila.
- ^{z} On June 26, 2014, the Brooklyn Nets acquired the draft rights to Markel Brown from Minnesota in exchange for cash considerations.
- ^{aa} On the same draft day, Minnesota traded their draft rights to Alessandro Gentile to the Houston Rockets in exchange for cash considerations.
- ^{ab} On June 25, 2015, the Cleveland Cavaliers acquired draft rights to 31st pick Cedi Osman, draft rights to 36th pick Rakeem Christmas, and a 2019 second-round pick from Minnesota Timberwolves in return for the draft rights to 24th pick Tyus Jones.
- ^{ac} On September 17, 2014, the Sacramento Kings acquired Jason Terry, a 2015 second-round pick (the 36th pick) and a 2016 second-round pick from the Houston Rockets in return for Alonzo Gee and Scotty Hopson Later, on December 19, 2014, the Houston Rockets acquired Corey Brewer from Minnesota Timberwolves and Alexey Shved from Philadelphia 76ers; Minnesota acquired Troy Daniels, Sacramento's 2015 second-round pick (the 36th pick), a 2016 second-round pick and cash considerations from Houston; and Philadelphia acquired draft rights to Sergei Lishouk and a 2015 second-round pick from Houston and Ronny Turiaf from Minnesota.
- ^{ad} On June 22, 2017, Chicago acquired Minnesota's first round pick (No. 7), Kris Dunn, and Zach LaVine from Minnesota for Jimmy Butler and Chicago's first round pick (No. 16)
- ^{ae} On June 30, 2017, the Minnesota Timberwolves acquired the Utah Jazz's 2018 first round pick (the 20th pick) in exchange for Ricky Rubio.
- ^{af} On June 24, 2022, Memphis acquired draft rights of 19th pick Jake LaRavia and a 2023 2nd round pick for the draft rights of 22nd pick Walker Kessler and 29th pick TyTy Washington
- ^{ag} On June 24, 2022, Charlotte acquired draft rights of 40th pick Bryce McGowens for the draft rights of 45th pick Josh Minott and the New York Knicks' 2023 2nd round pick.
- ^{[ah]}On June 24, 2022, Indiana acquired Brown for a 2026 2nd round pick swap and cash considerations.
