= Ricky Dandan =

Filipino basketball coach (1961–2024)

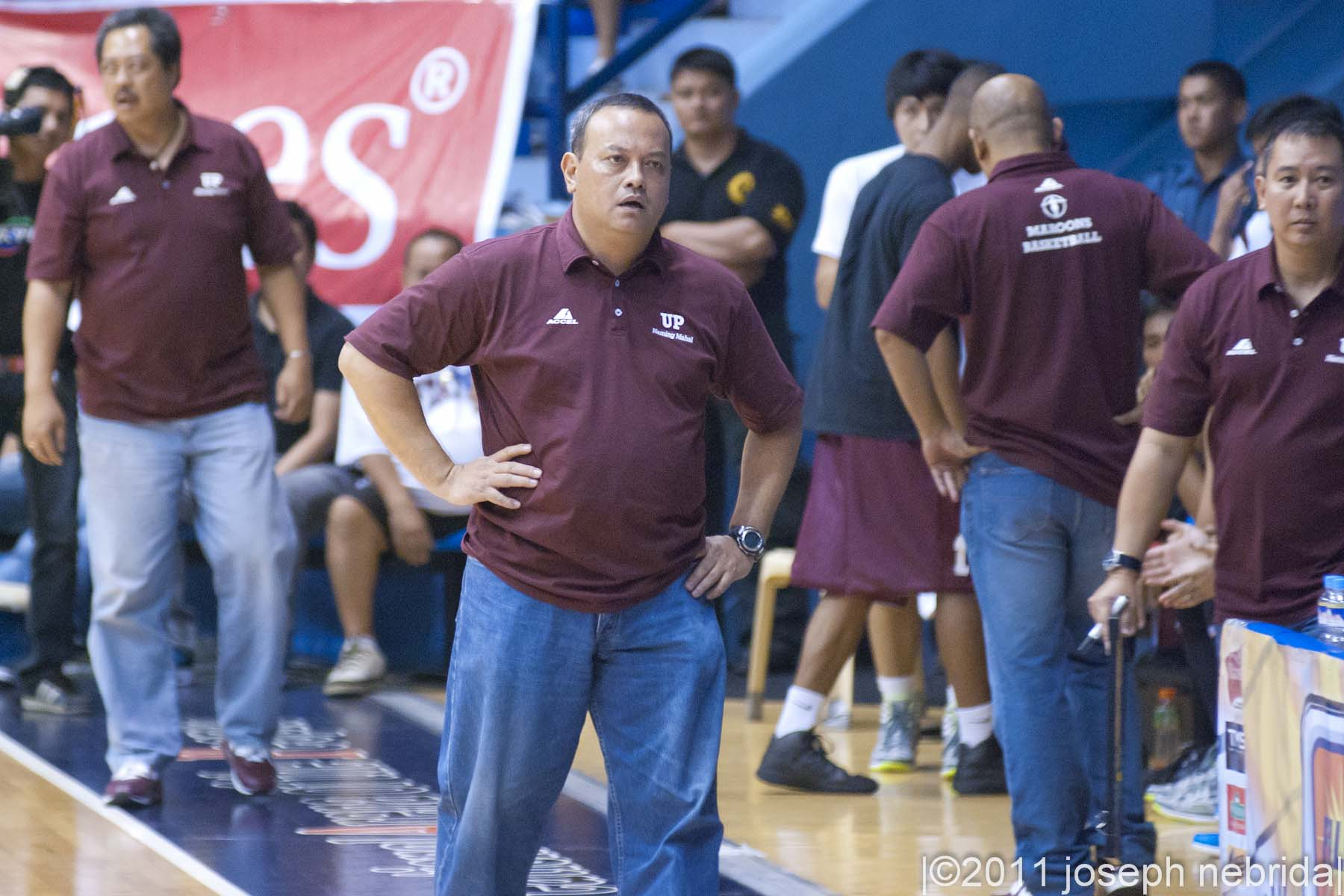

Personal information
- Born: 9 December 1961
- Died: 13 November 2024 (aged 62) Ermita, Manila, Metro Manila, Philippines

Career information
- College: UP
- Coaching career: 1998–2024

Career history

Coaching
- 1998: Manila Metrostars
- 2000–2001: Ateneo-Hapee
- 2001–2002: Ateneo-Pioneer
- 2005–2009: Air21 Express (assistant)
- 2010–2012: Powerade Tigers (assistant)
- 2011–2013: UP
- 2012–2013: GlobalPort Batang Pier (assistant)
- 2017: Columbian Dyip (assistant)
- 2017–2018: Columbian Dyip
- 2016–2021: UP (assistant)
- 2022–2023: Bataan Risers

Frederick Oliver B. Dandan (9 December 1961 – 13 November 2024) was a Filipino basketball coach.

Dandan both played for and coached the University of the Philippines Diliman basketball teams, the Fighting Maroons.

== Career ==
Dandan, nicknamed Ricky, was born on 9 December 1961.

Dandan played for the UP Fighting Maroons in the UAAP until 1985 under coach Joe Lipa.

In 1998, Dandan started his coaching career in Manila Metrostars. He also worked as head coach of Ateneo Blue Eagles' PBL teams. He later worked as an assistant coach for Air21 Express and Powerade Tigers, and on its successor team GlobalPort Batang Pier.

While at Powerade, he served as head coach of his alma mater UP Fighting Maroons. But due to multiple dismal finishes, he was replaced.

Dandan also served as lead assistant for Columbian Dyip, but after Chris Gavina resigned after two games, he was appointed head coach. Due to two low-ranking finishes in the conferences he coached in, he resigned in order to focus as an assistant to Bo Perasol for the Maroons.

He last coached for the Bataan Risers in the MPBL.

== Personal life and death ==
Dandan was married to Annielou and had two children. He died from renal cell carcinoma at the Philippine General Hospital in Manila on 13 November 2024, aged 62.

== Coaching record ==
=== Collegiate record ===
| Season | Team | GP | W | L | PCT | Finish | PG | PW | PL | PCT | Results |
|---|---|---|---|---|---|---|---|---|---|---|---|
| 2011 | UP | 14 | 2 | 12 | .143 | 8th | — | — | — | — | Eliminated |
| 2012 | UP | 14 | 1 | 13 | .071 | 8th | — | — | — | — | Eliminated |
| 2013 | UP | 14 | 0 | 14 | .000 | 8th | — | — | — | — | Eliminated |
| Totals | | 42 | 3 | 39 | .071 | | 0 | 0 | 0 | .000 | 0 championship |

=== PBA ===
| Team | Season | Conference | Finish | GP | W | L | PCT | GP | PW | PL | PCT | Results |
|---|---|---|---|---|---|---|---|---|---|---|---|---|
| Columbian | 2017–18 | Philippine Cup | 12th | 11 | 1 | 10 | .091 | — | — | — | — | Eliminated |
| Columbian | 2017–18 | Commissioner's Cup | 9th | 11 | 4 | 7 | .364 | — | — | — | — | (resigned) |
| Career Total | | | | 15 | 4 | 18 | .364 | 0 | 0 | 0 | .000 | 0 championships |
