= Powerade Tigers all-time roster =

This is a list of players for the Powerade Tigers, a Philippine Basketball Association team formed on 2002 who appeared for at least one game.

== A ==
Name	Position	School/Club Team	Season	Acquisition via	Ref.
Johnny Abarrientos	Guard	Far Eastern	2002–2006	Trade	
Freddie Abuda	Forward	Cebu	2002	Free Agency	
Rommel Adducul	Forward	San Sebastian	2011–2012	Free Agency	
Francis Allera	Forward	Santo Tomas	2009–2012	Rookie Draft	
Rabeh Al-Hussaini	Center	Ateneo de Manila	2012	Trade	
Sean Anthony	Forward	McGill	2010–2012	Trade	
William Antonio	Forward	Chaminade	2002–2006, 2010–2012	Rookie Draft	
John Arigo	Forward	North Florida	2005–2009	Trade	
Leo Avenido	Guard	Far Eastern	2002–2004, 2006, 2008–2009	Rookie Draft	

== B ==
Name	Position	School/Club Team	Season	Acquisition via	Ref.
Edwin Bacani	Guard	Far Eastern	2006	Trade	
Froilan Baguion	Guard	National	2008	Free Agency	
Estong Ballesteros	Forward	Santo Tomas	2002	Free Agency	
Bryant Basemore	Guard	–	2002	Import	
Nic Belasco	Forward	Notre Dame	2008–2009, 2012	Trade, Free Agency	
Rashad Bell	Forward	Boston	2007, 2010	Import	
Cris Bolado	Center	National	2002–2003	Free Agency	
Ken Bono	Center	Adamson	2009–2010	Trade	
Lawrence Bonus	Center	Manila	2008–2009	Free Agency	
Torraye Braggs	Center	Xavier	2002	Import	
Lowell Briones	Forward	–	2002	Free Agency	
Ronjay Buenafe	Guard	Emilio Aguinaldo	2007–2009	Rookie Draft	

== C ==
Name	Position	School/Club Team	Season	Acquisition via	Ref.
Alex Cabagnot	Guard	Hawaii-Hilo	2007–2009	Trade	
Manuel Caceres	Forward	PSBA	2006–2007	Rookie Draft	
Calvin Cage	Guard	Buffalo	2008	Import	
Ricky Calimag	Forward	San Beda	2007–2012	Trade	
Ronald Capati	Forward	St. Benilde	2006	Free Agency	
Alex Carcamo	Forward	–	2005	Import	
Jeffrey Cariaso	Guard	Sonoma State	2002–2005	Trade	
Russell Carter	Guard	Notre Dame	2011	Import	
JV Casio	Point Guard	La Salle	2011–2012	Rookie Draft	
Cesar Catli	Forward	Far Eastern	2007–2010	Trade	
Gec Chia	Guard	Ateneo	2002–2005	Rookie Draft	
Donald Copeland	Guard	Seton Hall	2008	Import	
Alex Crisano	Center/Forward	Brooklyn	2011–2012	Free Agency	
Celino Cruz	Guard	Far Eastern	2010–2012	Free Agency	
Marvin Cruz	Guard	UP Diliman	2009–2010	Trade	

== D ==
Name	Position	School/Club Team	Season	Acquisition via	Ref.
Carlos Daniel	Forward	–	2002	Import	
Gary David	Guard	Lyceum	2004–05; 2010–2012	Rookie Draft; Trade	
Brandon Dean	Guard	Arkansas	2008	Import	
Aries Dimaunahan	Guard	Santo Tomas	2007–2009	Trade	
Jason Dixon	Center	–	2008	Import	
Kenneth Duremdes	Guard	Adamson	2007–2008	Trade	

== E ==
Name	Position	School/Club Team	Season	Acquisition via	Ref.
Edgar Echavez	Guard	Misamis Institute	2007	Free Agency	
Rosell Ellis	Forward	McNeese State	2002	Import	
Ronjay Enrile	Guard	Letran	2006–2012	Rookie Draft	
Dennis Espino	Center	Santo Tomas	2009–2011	Free Agency	
Tony Boy Espinosa	Guard	La Salle	2006	Free Agency	

== F ==
Name	Position	School/Club Team	Season	Acquisition via	Ref.
Kalani Ferreria	Guard	Moorpark C.C.	2006	Trade	
Jason Forte	Guard	Southern Mississippi	2012	Import	
Gerard Francisco	Forward	Santo Tomas	2005–2006	Trade	
Bernzon Franco	Center	Philippine Christian	2006	Trade	

== G ==
Name	Position	School/Club Team	Season	Acquisition via	Ref.
Michael Gavino	Center	UP Diliman	2006–2007	Rookie Draft	
Allen Gamboa	Forward	State	2002	Rookie Draft	
George Gervin Jr.	Guard	Houston	2008	Import	
Norman Gonzales	Forward	San Beda	2009–2011	Free Agency	
Wesley Gonzales	Forward-Guard	Ateneo	2009–2010	Free Agency	
Rey Guevarra	Guard-Forward	Letran	2012	Trade	

== H ==
Name	Position	School/Club Team	Season	Acquisition via	Ref.
Ron Hale	Forward	–	2002	Import	
Rudy Hatfield	Forward	Michigan	2002–2005	Free Agency	
Bong Hawkins	Forward	Perpetual Help	2002	Free Agency	
Bakari Hendrix	Forward	Gonzaga	2005	Import	
Reynel Hugnatan	Forward	Manila	2003–2005	Rookie Draft	

== I ==
Name	Position	School/Club Team	Season	Acquisition via	Ref.
Mark Isip	Forward	Far Eastern	2007	Trade	

== J ==
Name	Position	School/Club Team	Season	Acquisition via	Ref.
Darell Johns	Center	–	2005	Import	
Anthony Johnson	Forward	–	2007	Import	
Dwayne Jones	Center	Saint Joseph's	2012	Import	
Poch Juinio	Center	State	2002–2005	Trade	

== K ==
Name	Position	School/Club Team	Season	Acquisition via	Ref.
Doug Kramer	Center	Ateneo	2011–2012	Trade	

== L ==
Name	Position	School/Club Team	Season	Acquisition via	Ref.
Chico Lanete	Guard	Lyceum	2010–2011	Trade	
Gilbert Lao	Center	Santo Tomas	2002; 2004–2006	Free Agency	
Marcio Lassiter	Guard-Forward	Cal State Fullerton	2011–2012	Rookie Draft	
Eddie Laure	Forward	Adamson	2010–2011	Free Agency	
Rudy Lingganay	Guard	East	2011–2012	Rookie Draft	

== M ==
Name	Position	School/Club Team	Season	Acquisition via	Ref.
Mark Macapagal	Guard	San Sebastian	2007–2011	Trade	
Billy Mamaril	Center	Bakersfield	2005–2006	Trade	
Jojo Manalo	Guard	Perpetual Help	2002	Rookie Draft	
James Martinez	Guard	East	2011–2012	Trade	
Rashad McCants	Guard/Forward	North Carolina	2012	Import	
Artemus McClary	Forward	Jacksonville	2003	Import	
Paolo Mendoza	Guard	UP Diliman	2010–2011	Trade	
Dennis Miranda	Guard	Far Eastern	2005–2007	Rookie Draft	
Jason Misolas	Forward	Letran	2002, 2006–2009	Rookie Draft	
Renato Morano	Guard	San Beda	2002–2006	Rookie Draft	

== P ==
Name	Position	School/Club Team	Season	Acquisition via	Ref.
Chris Pacana	Guard	St. Francis	2006–2007	Rookie Draft	
Ali Peek	Center	St. Mary's	2005–2007	Trade	
James Penny	Center	Texas Christian	2009, 2010	Import	
Chris Porter	Center	Chipola/Auburn	2011	Import	

== Q ==
Name	Position	Number	School/Club Team	Season	Acquisition via	Ref.
J.R. Quiñahan	Forward	48	Visayas	2010–2011	Trade	

== R ==
Name	Position	School/Club Team	Season	Acquisition via	Ref.
Manny Ramos	Forward	La Salle	2007	Trade	
Neil Rañeses	Forward	Visayas	2005–2006	Rookie Draft	
Rafi Reavis	Center/Forward	Coppin State	2002–2006	Rookie Draft	
Jai Reyes	Guard	Ateneo	2010–2011	Rookie Draft	
Rob Reyes	Forward/center	Flagler	2010–2011	Free Agency	
Jaja Richards	Forward/center	Loyola	2004	Import	
Renren Ritualo	Guard	La Salle	2010–2011	Free Agency	
R.J Rizada	Guard	Far Eastern	2006–2011	Far Eastern	
Larry Rodriguez	Forward	PMI	2009–2010	Trade	
Chris Ross	Guard	Marshall	2009–2010	Trade	

== S ==
Name	Position	School/Club Team	Season	Acquisition via	Ref.
Allan Salangsang	Forward	Letran	2006–2007	Free Agency	
Jondan Salvador	Forward/center	Saint Benilde	2012	Trade	
Mark Sanford	Forward/center	Washington	2004–2005	Import	
Rodney Santos	Guard/Forward	San Sebastian	2009	Free Agency	
Jovy Sese	Forward	Manuel Luis Quezon	2002	Free Agency	
Dale Singson	Guard	Santo Tomas	2005–2006, 2009–2010	Trade	
Omar Sneed	Forward	Memphis	2012	Import	
Ervin Sotto	Forward/center	Saint Francis	2007	Trade	
JJ Sullinger	Forward/center	Ohio State	2009	Import	

== T ==
Name	Position	School/Club Team	Season	Acquisition via	Ref.
Asi Taulava	Center	BYU-Hawaii	2007–2010	Trade	
Mark Telan	Forward	De La Salle	2007–2009	Trade	
Omar Thomas	Forward	UTEP	2006	Import	
Chester Tolomia	Forward	Perpetual Help	2006–2008	Free Agency	
Lordy Tugade	Guard/Forward	National	2012	Trade	

== V ==
Name	Position	School/Club Team	Season	Acquisition via	Ref.
Josh Vanlandingham	Guard	Pacific Lutheran	2011–2012	Trade	
Jeff Varem	Center	Buffalo Traditional High School	2007	Import	

== W ==
Name	Position	School/Club Team	Season	Acquisition via	Ref.
Rob Wainwright	Forward	Solano	2002–2006	Free Agency	
Fred Williams	Forward	–	2002	Import	
John Williamson	Forward	Cincinnati	2010	Import	

== Y ==
Name	Position	School/Club Team	Season	Acquisition via	Ref.
Joseph Yeo	Guard	De La Salle	2006–2007	Rookie Draft	

== Z ==
Name	Position	School/Club Team	Season	Acquisition via	Ref.
Martin Zeno	Guard	Texas Tech	2011	Import	
