= 2023 Letran Knights basketball team =

2023 Letran Knights men's basketball

Record
- Elims rank: #9
- 2023 record: 2-16
- Head coach: Rensy Bajar (1st season)
- Assistant coaches: Raymund Tiongco; Lou Gatumbato; Matthew Sia; John Paul Caparas
- Captain: Kurt Reyson (4th season)

The 2023 Letran Knights men's basketball team represented Colegio de San Juan de Letran in the 99th season of the National Collegiate Athletic Association in the Philippines. The men's basketball tournament for the school year 2023-24 began on September 24, 2023, and the host school for the season is Jose Rizal University.

The Knights, the Season 98 champions, began their campaign on September 24, 2023, against the hosts JRU Heavy Bombers in a losing effort.

The four-peat seeking Knights concluded their campaign on a sour note, finished the elimination round at ninth place with 2 wins and 16 losses, the worst record in school history.

Point guard Jay Garupil bagged the inaugural Freshman of the Year award.

== Coaching changes ==
Bonnie Tan formally parted ways with the Knights as he was named as the new head coach of NorthPort Batang Pier in the PBA.

Tan was replaced by his deputy, Rensy Bajar, as the new head coach of the Knights.

Joining Bajar on the side lines are Raymund Tiongco, Lou Gatumbato, Matthew Sia, and John Paul Caparas.

== Roster changes ==
The Knights lost five of its key players from the 2022 championship team. Fran Yu, King Caralipio, Brent Paraiso, Louie Sangalang, and Tommy Olivario have used up all their playing years & were drafted in the Philippine Basketball Association.

Former UST Growling Tiger and De La Salle Green Archer guard Deo Cuajao will finally play for the Knights after redshirting for one year.

Among the rookies who will suit up for the Knights are Former UST Tiger Cub James Jumao-as, Paolo Galvez, and Jay Garupil.

Former UST Growling Tiger Ira Bataller, who joined the Knights in 2020, will finally play this season.

== Roster ==
Letran Knights roster
Players
Coaches

Pos.	No.	Nat.	Name	Height	Year	High School
SF	17	(Philippines)	Ariar, Kint Devone I.	6'3" (1.91m)	3rd	Saint Dominic Savio Learning Center
SG	24	(Philippines)	Bojorcelo, Josef Enrico	6'2" (1.88m)	2nd	Caybiga High School
PF	23	(Philippines)	Brillantes, Ken Randolph	6'5" (1.96m)	1st	University of Santo Tomas
SG	10	(Philippines)	Cuajao, Vincent Petdeo D.	6'0" (1.83m)	1st	Holy Child College of Davao
PG	12	(Philippines)	Fajardo, Nicko M.	6'0" (1.83m)	1st	College of the Immaculate Conception
PG	2	(Philippines)	Garupil, Jay Stephen	6'0" (1.83m)	1st	Asian College Dumaguete
SF	5	(Philippines)	Go, Rafael S.	6'4" (1.93m)	2nd	Chiang Kai Shek College
PF	35	(Philippines)	Guarino, Neil Andrey A.	6'6" (1.98m)	4th	Colegio de San Juan de Letran
PF	9	(Philippines)	Javillonar, Marc Paolo J.	6'6" (1.98m)	4th	Nazareth School of National University
PG	20	(Philippines)	Jumao-as, James	6'0" (1.83m)	1st	University of Santo Tomas
SG	39	(Philippines)	Monje, Kobe Bryan	6'3" (1.91m)	2nd	Colegio de San Juan de Letran
PF	1	(Philippines)	Nunag, Joseph Jr	6'5" (1.96m)	1st	Dela Paz Libutad High School
PG	8	(Philippines)	Reyson, Kurt Spencer E. (injured) (C)	5'10" (1.78m)	4th	Colegio de San Juan de Letran
PF	4	(Philippines)	Santos, Kevin Kyle	6'6" (1.98m)	2nd	St. Augustine Institute of Pampanga
SG	7	(United States)	Tolentino, Kyle Dominic P.	6'3" (1.91m)	3rd	Colegio de San Juan de Letran
SG	18	(Philippines)	Bautista, Justine	6'3" (1.91m)	2nd	Colegio de San Juan de Letran
PF	0	(Philippines)	Bataller, Ira Spencer	6'5" (1.96m)	1st	Arellano University
PG	11	(Philippines)	Galvez, Kier Paolo	5'10" (1.78m)	1st	St. Jerome School of Novaliches

Head coach

- Rensy Bajar

Assistant coach(es)

- Raymund Tiongco
- Lou Gatumbato
- Matthew Sia
- John Paul Caparas

Team manager

- Joey Uy

Legend

- (C) Team captain
- Injured

=== Depth chart ===
Pos.	Starting 5	Bench 1	Bench 2
C	Javillonar	Santos	Brillantes
PF	Ariar	Guarino	Go
SF	Monje	Tolentino	Bojorcelo
SG	Cuajao	Garupil	Jumao-as
PG	Reyson	Fajardo	Nunag

== NCAA Season 99 games results ==
Elimination games were played in a double round-robin format. All games were aired on GMA, and livestreamed via the Facebook pages and YouTube channels of NCAA Philippines and GMA Sports.

Date	Time	Opponent	Venue	Result	Record
First round of eliminations
Sep 24	3:00 p.m.	JRU Heavy Bombers	Mall of Asia Arena • Pasay	L 79–85^{OT}	0–1
Game Highs: Points: Reyson – 18; Rebounds: Javillonar – 11; Assists: Fajardo, Reyson – 4 each
Sep 27	4:00 p.m.	Lyceum Pirates	Filoil EcoOil Centre • San Juan	L 69–70	0–2
Game Highs: Points: Reyson – 17; Rebounds: Go, Santos – 8 each; Assists: Reyson – 6
Oct 1	10:00 a.m.	EAC Generals	Filoil EcoOil Centre • San Juan	L 65–75	0–3
Game Highs: Points: Cuajao – 12; Rebounds: Go – 6; Assists: Reyson – 5
Oct 6	4:00 p.m.	San Beda Red Lions	Filoil EcoOil Centre • San Juan	L 63–68	0–4
Game Highs: Points: Reyson – 22; Rebounds: Monje – 7; Assists: Ariar – 4
Oct 8	12:20 p.m.	Arellano Chiefs	Filoil EcoOil Centre • San Juan	L 80–87	0–5
Game Highs: Points: Monje – 18; Rebounds: Monje, Nunag – 11 each; Assists: Reyson – 7
Oct 11	4:00 p.m.	Mapúa Cardinals	Filoil EcoOil Centre • San Juan	L 71–77	0–6
Game Highs: Points: Cuajao – 20; Rebounds: Santos – 11; Assists: Reyson – 6
Oct 15	12:20 p.m.	Perpetual Altas	Filoil EcoOil Centre • San Juan	L 59–74	0–7
Game Highs: Points: Cuajao – 15; Rebounds: Nunag, Santos – 12 each; Assists: Ariar, Reyson – 3 each
Oct 18	4:00 p.m.	San Sebastian Stags	Filoil EcoOil Centre • San Juan	W 86–71	1–7
Game Highs: Points: Cuajao – 14; Rebounds: Santos – 13; Assists: Ariar – 5
Oct 22	2:40 p.m.	Benilde Blazers	Filoil EcoOil Centre • San Juan	L 55–68	1–8
Game Highs: Points: Cuajao – 11; Rebounds: Ariar – 11; Assists: Fajardo – 3
Tenth place at 1 win–8 losses after 1st round
Second round of eliminations
Oct 25	2:00 p.m.	Perpetual Altas	Filoil EcoOil Centre • San Juan	L 61–73	1–9
Game Highs: Points: Javillonar – 14; Rebounds: Javillonar – 8; Assists: Garupil – 5
Oct 28	3:00 p.m.	Mapúa Cardinals	Filoil EcoOil Centre • San Juan	L 66–69	1–10
Game Highs: Points: Cuajao – 12; Rebounds: Ariar – 8; Assists: Bataller – 5
Nov 3	1:30 p.m.	EAC Generals	Filoil EcoOil Centre • San Juan	L 69–82	1–11
Game Highs: Points: Monje – 14; Rebounds: Monje, Santos – 7 each; Assists: Cuajao, Reyson – 3 each
Nov 5	12:00 p.m.	Lyceum Pirates	Filoil EcoOil Centre • San Juan	L 79–85	1–12
Game Highs: Points: Cuajao – 24; Rebounds: Santos – 9; Assists: Fajardo, Garupil – 3 each
Nov 8	1:30 p.m.	San Sebastian Stags	Filoil EcoOil Centre • San Juan	L 75–94	1–13
Game Highs: Points: Garupil – 16; Rebounds: Garupil – 6; Assists: Garupil – 5
Nov 11	3:00 p.m.	JRU Heavy Bombers	Filoil EcoOil Centre • San Juan	L 74–79	1–14
Game Highs: Points: Monje – 18; Rebounds: Ariar, Garupil, Monje, Santos – 5 each; Assists: Garupil – 11
Nov 14	1:30 p.m.	Arellano Chiefs	Filoil EcoOil Centre • San Juan	W 67–58	2–14
Game Highs: Points: Monje – 13; Rebounds: Garupil – 6; Assists: Garupil – 3
Nov 19	3:30 p.m.	Benilde Blazers	Filoil EcoOil Centre • San Juan	L 54–72	2–15
Game Highs: Points: Monje – 18; Rebounds: Javillonar, Monje – 9 each; Assists: Bataller – 3
Nov 24	3:30 p.m.	San Beda Red Lions	Filoil EcoOil Centre • San Juan	L 68–77	2–16
Game Highs: Points: Monje – 17; Rebounds: Monje – 11; Assists: Garupil – 5
Ninth place after 2nd round (1 win–8 losses in the 2nd round)

Times listed above are in UTC+08:00

Source: GMA Network

== Awards ==
Player	Award
Jay Garupil	NCAA Freshman of the Year
