= Rosell Ellis =

American basketball player

Personal information
- Born: February 19, 1975 (age 51) Seattle, Washington, U.S.
- Listed height: 6 ft 6 in (1.98 m)
- Listed weight: 209 lb (95 kg)

Career information
- High school: Rainier Beach (Seattle, Washington)
- College: USU Eastern (1993–1995); McNeese State (1995–1997)
- NBA draft: 1997: undrafted
- Playing career: 1997–2011
- Position: Small forward / power forward

Career history
- 1997: Deportivo Roca
- 1997–1999: Des Moines Dragons
- 1999–2001: Yakima Sun Kings
- 2001: Chicago Skyliners
- 2001: Pop Cola Panthers
- 2002: Coca-Cola Tigers
- 2002–2003: Yakima Sun Kings
- 2003: Great Lakes Storm
- 2003: Barangay Ginebra Kings
- 2003–2004: ASPAC Hewlett-Packard Jakarta
- 2004: Barangay Ginebra Kings
- 2004–2005: Perth Wildcats
- 2006: Yakima Sun Kings
- 2006: Cocodrilos de Caracas
- 2006–2007: South Dragons
- 2007: Alaska Aces
- 2007–2009: Townsville Crocodiles
- 2009: Alaska Aces
- 2009–2010: Al Ittihad Jeddah
- 2010–2011: Townsville Crocodiles

Career highlights
- SPL champion (2010); PBA champion (2007 Fiesta); Best Import of the Conference (2007 Fiesta); CBA champion (2000, 2006); 2× CBA All-Star (2001, 2003); All-NBL Third Team (2005); Southland Player of the Year (1997); First-team All-Southland (1997)

Rosell Ellis (born February 19, 1975) is an American former professional basketball player.

== High school and college ==
From 1993–1995, he played college basketball at the College of Eastern Utah. In 1995, he then moved to McNeese State of the NCAA Division I for his junior and senior years. During his senior year at McNeese State, Ellis averaged 18.5 points per game on almost 67 percent shooting.

== Professional ==
After his college career, Ellis joined Deportivo Roca of Argentina for the 1997 season. Later that year, he joined the Des Moines Dragons of the now-defunct International Basketball Association for the 1997–98 season, becoming the league's fifth-leading scorer. He attracted scouts to his games but had an incident in January 1998. There were NBA scouts in the stands when Ellis lost his mind and put an IBA referee in a choke hold. According to Ellis, a referee, Bob Schoewe, was berating players as they lined up around the paint for free throws. Ellis snapped back at Schoewe, who denies insulting the players, and in turn gave Ellis a technical foul in retaliation. Ellis protested again and the ref called a second technical and ejected him from the game. Ellis ran to the scorer's table where Schoewe was reporting the ejection, leaped on the referee's back, and put Schoewe in a sleeper hold. A throng of coaches, players, referees, and security officers pulled Ellis away from Schoewe and brought him to the locker room. The IBA banned him for a year for this action. This action was after Latrell Sprewell's choking of his coach, thus Ellis was shunned by NBA scouts. Now, Ellis looks at this incident as one of his big misdeeds.

On October 2, 2000, he signed with the Detroit Pistons. However, he was waived on October 21.

Ellis joined the Perth Wildcats for the 2004–05 season as a late replacement for Jaron Brown, where he played both power forward and small forward. He was the best shooter in the NBL for that season, shooting 61% from the floor. He was named the Round 21 NBL Player of the Week in 2005. In the same season, he also collected the 2005 Gordon Ellis Medal, the Wildcats' highest individual player honour and the team's Best Defensive Player award. He set his NBL-career best 38 points and 15 rebounds vs Crocodiles on November 26, 2004. He finished the 2004–05 season with averages of 17.8ppg, 9.6rpg, 2.7apg and 2.0spg.

In October 2006, he signed with the South Dragons for the 2006–07 season. Ellis led the NBL in rebounding in 2007 by averaging 11.3 rebounds in 27 games. In March 2007, he joined the Alaska Aces. Later that year, he signed with the Townsville Crocodiles for the 2007–08 season. However, just two games into the season, he suffered a season-ending chest injury and returned to the United States for rehab.

In September 2008, he signed a new two-year deal with the Crocodiles. In March 2009, he re-joined the Alaska Aces. In July 2009, the second year of his two-year contract was terminated by the Crocodiles.

On December 15, 2010, he re-signed with the Townsville Crocodiles for the rest of the 2010–11 NBL season.
