= 2007 PBA Fiesta Conference finals =

Team	Coach	Wins
Alaska Aces	Tim Cone	4
Talk 'N Text Phone Pals	Derrick Pumaren	3
- Dates: July 6–20, 2007
- MVP: Willie Miller
- Television: ABC
- Announcers: See broadcast notes
- Radio network: Sports Radio 918
- Announcers: See broadcast notes

PBA Fiesta Conference finals chronology
- < 2005–06 2008 >

PBA finals chronology
- < 2006–07 Philippine 2007–08 Philippine >

The 2007 PBA Fiesta Conference finals was the best-of-7 championship series of the 2007 PBA Fiesta Conference and the conclusion of the conference's playoffs. The series was a best-of-seven affair and was the 93rd championship disputed in the league.

== Road to the finals ==
Alaska		Talk 'N Text
Finished 12–6 (.667): 2nd	Elimination round	Finished 11–7 (.611): 4th
Bye	Wildcard phase	Def. Air21, 2-1 (QF)
Bye	Quarterfinals	Def. Air21, 2-1 (QF)
Def. San Miguel, 4–2	Semifinals	Def. Red Bull, 4–2

== Series scoring summary ==
Team	Game 1	Game 2	Game 3	Game 4	Game 5	Game 6	Game 7	Wins
Alaska	113	113	87	86	104	121	99	4
Talk 'N Text	85	120	95	82	107	110	96	3
Venue	Araneta	Araneta	Araneta	Araneta	Araneta	Araneta	Cuneta

=== Game 1 ===
ABC

July 6
7:30 P.M.

boxscore

Alaska Aces 113, Talk 'N Text Phone Pals 85
Scoring by quarter: 16–28, 29–16, 37–19, 31–22
Pts: Cortez, Ellis 22; Rebs: Rossel Ellis 13; Asts: Rossel Ellis 10	Pts: James Sullinger 25; Rebs: James Sullinger 12; Asts: Mark Cardona 3

Araneta Coliseum, Quezon City
Referees: Cruz, Herrera, Ferrer

=== Game 2 ===
ABC

July 8
6:30 P.M.

boxscore

Alaska Aces 113, Talk 'N Text Phone Pals 120
Scoring by quarter: 28–30, 25–30, 31–33, 29–27
Pts: Rossel Ellis 40; Rebs: Rossel Ellis 18; Asts: Rossel Ellis 7	Pts: Mark Cardona 30; Rebs: Yancy de Ocampo 9 Asts: Mark Cardona 5

Araneta Coliseum, Quezon City
Referees: Calungcaguin, Aldaba, Ferrer

=== Game 3 ===
ABC

July 11
7:30 P.M.

boxscore

Alaska Aces 87, Talk 'N Text Phone Pals 95
Scoring by quarter: 30–15, 26–25, 12–27, 19–28
Pts: Willie Miller 29; Rebs: Rossel Ellis 13; Asts: Ellis, Hugnatan 3	Pts: James Sullinger 30; Rebs: James Sullinger 15; Asts: James Sullinger 8

Araneta Coliseum, Quezon City
Referees: Montiel, Herrera, Canizares

The Phone Pals trailed by 23 points in the second quarter and then launched an amazing comeback for a 2-1 lead in the series. Mark Cardona, named best player of the conference earlier, and Felix Belano, once again hit the big baskets for Talk 'N Text, which went down, 20-43, midway in the second quarter and went ahead 75-74, midway in the fourth.

=== Game 4 ===
ABC

July 13
7:30 P.M.

boxscore

Alaska Aces 86, Talk 'N Text Phone Pals 82
Scoring by quarter: 21–25, 24–18, 18–23, 23–16
Pts: Willie Miller 29; Rebs: Rossel Ellis 14; Asts: Willie Miller 4	Pts: James Sullinger 26; Rebs: James Sullinger 13; Asts: Felix Belano 5

Araneta Coliseum, Quezon City
Referees: Canizares, Aldaba, Cruz

Willie Miller, who before the game just become the seventh player in league history to win the Most Valuable Player (MVP) trophy more than once, scored 10 of his 29 points in the fourth quarter, eight in an 11-0 run that erased a seven-point deficit, down 73-80 with 3:57 to go, Miller took over and not only scored the points that mattered but dished out a brilliant assist to Sonny Thoss for a three-point play that capped the Alaska run and gave the Aces an 82-80 lead, 1:40 to go.

=== Game 5 ===
ABC

July 15
6:30 p.m.

boxscore

Alaska Aces 104, Talk 'N Text Phone Pals 107
Scoring by quarter: 25–31, 20–23, 27–25, 32–28
Pts: Rossel Ellis 28; Rebs: Rossel Ellis 16; Asts: Ellis, Miller 5	Pts: James Sullinger 24; Rebs: Carey, Sullinger 8 Asts: Mark Cardona 5

Araneta Coliseum, Quezon City
Attendance: 11,097
Referees: Quilinguen, Herrera, Montiel

=== Game 6 ===
ABC

July 18
7:05 p.m.

boxscore

Alaska Aces 121, Talk 'N Text Phone Pals 110
Scoring by quarter: 22–34, 34–11, 38–31, 27–34
Pts: Willie Miller 37; Rebs: Rossel Ellis 16; Asts: Cortez, Ellis 8	Pts: Mark Cardona 29; Rebs: James Sullinger 9 Asts: James Sullinger 3

Araneta Coliseum, Quezon City
Referees: Cruz, Calungcaguin, Canizares

Willie Miller erupted for a career-high 37 points as he redeemed himself from his lackluster six-point showing in Game five. The season MVP starred in Alaska's amazing 22-0 romp in the second quarter that fuelled the Aces' charge after a sluggish start. The Phone Pals took the opening quarter at 34-22 but went scoreless in the first seven minutes of the second period. The Aces went ahead 44-34 after the fiery salvo presided over by Miller, John Ferriols and Rosell Ellis.

It was the largest run by any team in a PBA finals since Ginebra came through with a 30-0 attack against Shell in their 1991 First Conference title playoff. The Aces sustained the momentum up to the finish, with their backs against the wall, played with great resolve, leading by as many as 22 points at 98-76 with 11:08 left to play.

=== Game 7 ===
ABC

July 20
7:05 P.M.

boxscore

Alaska Aces 99, Talk 'N Text Phone Pals 96
Scoring by quarter: 25–26, 20–27, 25–19, 29–24
Pts: Ellis 30; Rebs: Ellis 10; Asts: Ellis 9	Pts: Sullinger 30; Rebs: Sullinger 13; Asts: Sullinger 5
Alaska wins series 4-3

Cuneta Astrodome, Pasay
Attendance: 10,040
Referees: Quilinguen, Aldaba, Calungcaguin

Willie Miller came up with two big-time plays inside the final 1:17 as the Aces broke the game's last deadlock at 94 for a 98-94 lead which help Alaska cushion the impact of five missed free throws the rest of the way. The Phone Pals came within two and had a chance to tie the game in the dying seconds but JJ Sullinger was smothered by an Alaska defense that all but snuffed Talk 'N Text's hopes. After a split by Reynel Hugnatan, a last-second attempt by Sullinger from beyond the arc rimmed out.

2007 Fiesta Conference Champions

Alaska Aces
12th title

== Rosters ==
Alaska Aces roster
Players

Pos.	#	POB	Name	Height	Weight	DOB (YYYY–MM–DD)	From
G	1	(Philippines)	Mike Cortez	5 ft 11 in (1.80 m)			De La Salle
F	3	(United States)	Nic Belasco	6 ft 6 in (1.98 m)			Notre Dame (MD)
G	5	(Philippines)	Rensy Bajar	5 ft 10 in (1.78 m)			San Beda
C	7	(Papua New Guinea)	Sonny Thoss	6 ft 8 in (2.03 m)			James Cook
G	9	(Philippines)	Christian Luanzon (R)	6 ft 4 in (1.93 m)			UST
F	11	(Philippines)	Eddie Laure	6 ft 3 in (1.91 m)			Adamson
G	13	(Philippines)	Willie Miller	5 ft 11 in (1.80 m)			Letran
G/F	17	(Philippines)	Aaron Aban	6 ft 3 in (1.91 m)			Letran
F	21	(Philippines)	Reynel Hugnatan	6 ft 5 in (1.96 m)			Manila
G	22	(United States)	Jeffrey Cariaso (C)	6 ft 2 in (1.88 m)			Sonoma State
C	32	(Philippines)	Poch Juinio	6 ft 5 in (1.96 m)			Philippines
G	35	(United States)	Tony Dela Cruz (injured)	6 ft 4 in (1.93 m)			UC Irvine
G	50	(Philippines)	Dale Singson	6 ft 0 in (1.83 m)			UST
F	55	(Philippines)	John Ferriols	6 ft 4 in (1.93 m)			USJ–R
F	75	(United States)	Rosell Ellis (I)	6 ft 3 in (1.91 m)			McNeese State

Coaches
Head coach
- (United States) Tim Cone (James Madison)
Assistant(s)
- (Philippines) Joel Banal (Mapúa)
- (Philippines) Dickie Bachmann (De La Salle)
- (Philippines) Jojo Lastimosa (Ateneo)
- (Philippines) Luigi Trillo (De La Salle)

Legend
- (DP) Unsigned draft pick
- (FA) Free agent
- (S) Suspended
- (I) Import
- (R) Rookie
- Injured

Light	Dark	Alternate

Talk 'N Text Phone Pals roster
Players

Pos.	#	POB	Name	Height	Weight	DOB (YYYY–MM–DD)	From
F	0	(United States)	JJ Sullinger (I)	6 ft 6 in (1.98 m)	196 lb (89 kg)		Ohio State
SF	1	(Philippines)	Abby Santos (R)	6 ft 3 in (1.91 m)			UP Diliman
PG	3	(Philippines)	Jimmy Alapag (N)	5 ft 9 in (1.75 m)			Cal State San Bernardino
G	4	(United States)	Harvey Carey	6 ft 3 in (1.91 m)	210 lb (95 kg)		Sonoma State
F	7	(United States)	Jay Washington	6 ft 7 in (2.01 m)			Eckerd
G	8	(Philippines)	Patrick Fran	6 ft 1 in (1.85 m)			UST
G	9	(Philippines)	Mark Cardona	6 ft 0 in (1.83 m)	180 lb (82 kg)		De La Salle
F	12	(Philippines)	Jonathan Aldave	6 ft 3 in (1.91 m)			Letran
SG	14	(Philippines)	Renren Ritualo (N)	6 ft 0 in (1.83 m)			De La Salle
C	18	(Philippines)	Yancy de Ocampo	6 ft 9 in (2.06 m)	235 lb (107 kg)		Saint Francis of Assisi
F/C	28	(United States)	Miguel Noble	6 ft 5 in (1.96 m)	215 lb (98 kg)		Utica
PG	29	(Philippines)	Egay Billones	5 ft 9 in (1.75 m)	651 lb (295 kg)		Centro Escolar Las Piñas
PF	33	(Philippines)	Victor Pablo	6 ft 4 in (1.93 m)	200 lb (91 kg)		Far Eastern
F	41	(Philippines)	Don Allado	6 ft 6 in (1.98 m)	225 lb (102 kg)		De La Salle
PG	42	(Philippines)	Donbel Belano	5 ft 10 in (1.78 m)	178 lb (81 kg)		Visayas
C	88	(Tonga)	Asi Taulava (N)	6 ft 9 in (2.06 m)	245 lb (111 kg)		BYU–Hawaii

Coaches
Head coach
- (Philippines) Derrick Pumaren (UE)
Assistant(s)
- (Philippines) Bong Ramos (Mapúa)
- (Philippines) Tonichi Yturri (De La Salle)
- (Philippines) Agustin Tiongco
- (Philippines) Bong Ravena (UE)

Legend
- (DP) Unsigned draft pick
- (FA) Free agent
- (S) Suspended
- (I) Import
  - (R) Rookie
  - (N) Did not play due to NT commitment
- Injured

Light	Dark

== Broadcast notes ==
The Associated Broadcasting Company and DZSR Sports Radio broadcast the games nationwide.

Game	Play-by-play	Analyst(s)
Game 1	Ed Picson	Quinito Henson
Game 2	Ed Picson	Jason Webb
Game 3	Mico Halili	Quinito Henson
Game 4	Mico Halili	Jason Webb
Game 5	Ed Picson	Quinito Henson
Game 6	Mico Halili	Jason Webb
Game 7	Ed Picson	Quinito Henson

== Awards ==
- Best Player of the Conference: Mark Cardona (Talk 'N Text)
- Best Import of the Conference: Rossel Ellis (Alaska)
- Finals Most Valuable Player: Willie Miller (Alaska)
