= Rensy Bajar =

Filipino basketball coach and former player

Personal information
- Born: October 6, 1976 (age 50)
- Listed height: 5 ft 10 in (1.78 m)
- Listed weight: 155 lb (70 kg)

Career information
- College: San Beda
- PBA draft: 2002: 3rd round, 24th overall pick
- Drafted by: Shell Turbo Chargers
- Playing career: 2002–2007
- Position: Head coach
- Number: 5,7
- Coaching career: 2015–present

Career history

Playing
- 1998: Pangasinan Presidents
- 1999–2000: Nueva Ecija Patriots
- 2003–2005: Shell Turbo Chargers
- 2005–2007: Alaska Aces

Coaching
- 2015: UP
- 2017–2023: Diliman College
- 2018–2025: NorthPort Batang Pier (assistant)
- 2018–2023: Letran (assistant)
- 2023–2024: Letran
- 2024–present: Diliman College
- 2025: Titan Ultra Giant Risers (assistant)
- 2026: Titan Ultra Giant Risers

Career highlights
- As player: PBA champion (2007 Fiesta); As head coach: 2× UCBL champions (2018, 2019)

Rensy Bajar (born October 6, 1976) is a Filipino basketball coach. He most recently served as the head coach for the Titan Ultra Giant Risers of the Philippine Basketball Association (PBA). He's also coaching the Diliman Blue Dragons of UCAL (formerly UCBL). He played in the MBA for the team of the Pangasinan Presidents & Nueva Ecija Patriots.

He formerly coached Colegio de San Juan de Letran's men's basketball team of the National Collegiate Athletic Association (NCAA).

== Career ==
=== Playing career ===
Bajar played for San Beda Red Lions for collegiate basketball. He was drafted by Shell Turbo Chargers, but when the Shell was file leave of absence, he was picked by Alaska Aces, and win the 2007 Fiesta Conference.

=== Coaching career ===
==== UP Fighting Maroons ====
In 2015, UP Fighting Maroons, the season's host decided to hire him as their basketball head coach, with Joe Ward as its leading assistant. He guided the Fighting Maroons to a 2–0 start, with an opening win against UE Red Warriors, the next game was against La Salle, in a 66–71 fashion.

But the team went to lose next more games after losing to Kevin Ferrer-led UST.

==== Diliman Blue Dragons ====
In 2017, Bajar was hired as head coach of Diliman Blue Dragons, and led the team to back-to-back UCBL championships in 2018 and 2019.

==== NorthPort Batang Pier ====
Bajar was hired by NorthPort Batang Pier as an assistant coach in 2018.

==== Letran Knights ====
Due to Bonnie Tan's appointment as NorthPort Batang Pier's head coach, he recommended Bajar to be the head coach of Letran Knights. But due to dismal performance, he was replaced.

==== Return to Diliman Blue Dragons ====
Bajar returned to Diliman Blue Dragons after his stint with Knights.

==== Titan Ultra Giant Risers ====
In the aftermath of the sale of the NorthPort Batang Pier to Pureblends Corporation, Bajar retained his position as assistant coach of its successor franchise, the Titan Ultra Giant Risers. In February 2026, he was promoted as the head coach of Titan Ultra.

== Coaching record ==
=== College ===
Season	Team	Elimination round					Playoffs				
Season	Team	GP	W	L	PCT	Finish	GP	W	L	PCT	Results
2015	UP	14	3	11	.214	7th	–	–	–	–	Eliminated
2023	Letran	18	2	16	.211	9th	–	–	–	–	Eliminated
Totals		32	5	27	.156		–	–	–	–	0 championship
