= Mark Sanford (basketball) =

American basketball player (born 1976)

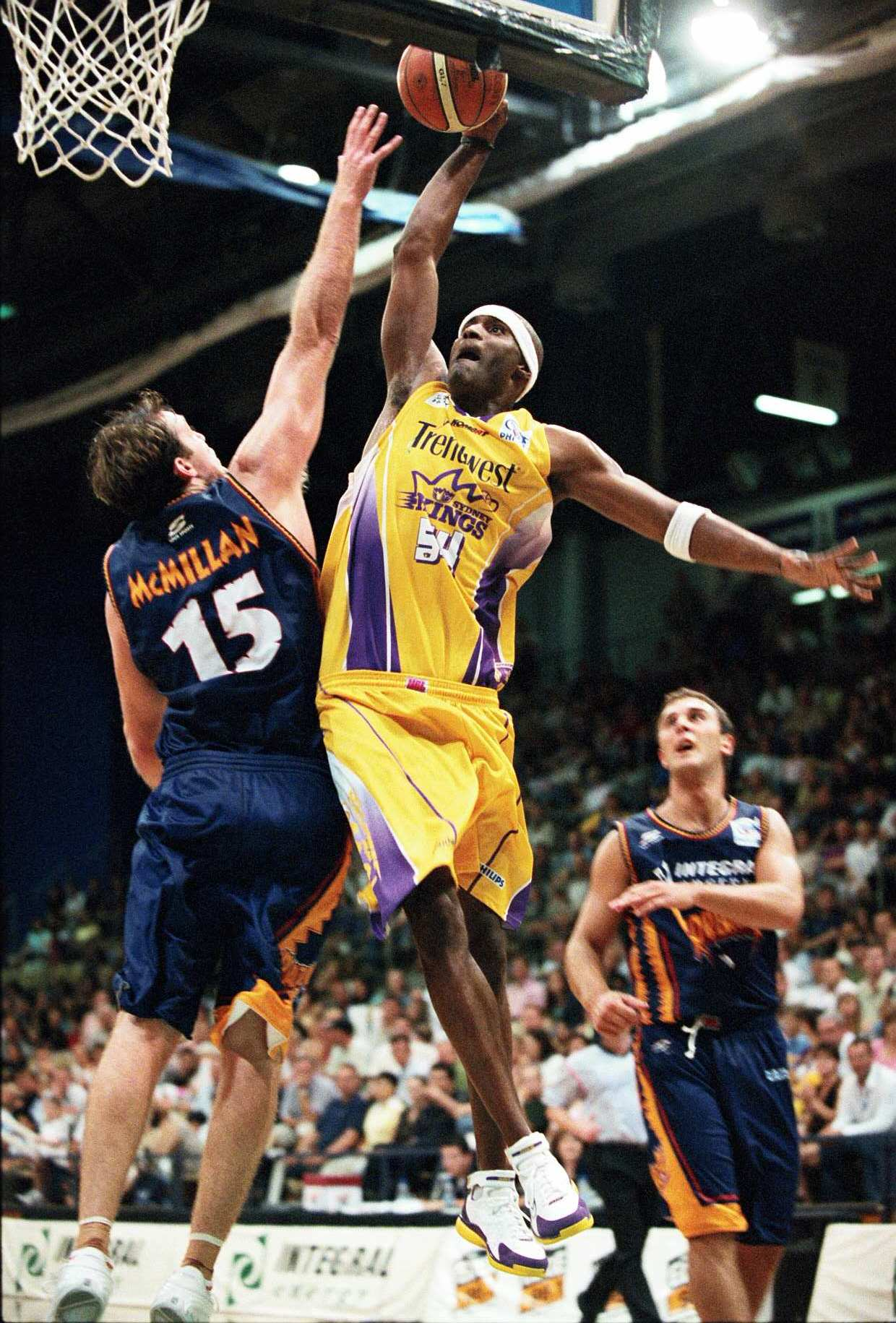

Personal information
- Born: February 7, 1976 (age 50) Dallas, Texas, U.S.
- Listed height: 6 ft 10 in (2.08 m)
- Listed weight: 230 lb (104 kg)

Career information
- High school: Carter (Dallas, Texas); Kimball (Dallas, Texas); Lincoln (San Diego, California)
- College: Washington (1994–1997)
- NBA draft: 1997: 2nd round, 30th overall pick
- Drafted by: Miami Heat
- Playing career: 1997–2008
- Position: Forward / guard
- Number: 3, 1, 54

Career highlights
- 2x First-team All-Pac-10 (1996, 1997)
- Stats at Basketball Reference

Eumarkjah Tywan "Mark" Sanford (born February 7, 1976) is an American former professional basketball player.

== Personal life ==
Sanford was born in Dallas, Texas, to Beverley and Richard Sanford. He is the second oldest of five children, Richard, Anthony, Zakirah, and Crystal. In his early years he was a big football fan. He played and was coached by his father Richard until his untimely murder in 1990. Richard Sanford never saw his son play basketball. When he died, Mark was 14 years old, stood 5 feet 8 inches and played football.

Mark told his father that he would play in the NFL, but in his heart - even back then - he felt he would never leave the impoverished neighborhood of South Oak Cliff, in Dallas, Texas. In the year following his father's death, Mark grew 8 inches, going from 5 feet 10 inches to 6 feet 6 inches. He stopped growing at 6 feet 10 inches.

== High school career ==
Sanford attended Dallas Carter High School and did not start playing basketball until he was in the tenth grade. In his first year of playing organized basketball Sanford won a share of the Sophomore of the Year award with Maceo Baston of Spruce High School. Halfway through his junior year, he transferred to Carter's cross town rival Kimball High School. That year he led Kimball to an undefeated record the second half of the season while averaging 26ppg 14rebs and 4blk. Their only loss came in the Championship game to Waco High School. Kimball finished the season ranked number 6 in the Southwest.

The summer after Sanford's junior year his mother moved him to San Diego California, where he enrolled into Lincoln High School. He led Lincoln Prep to the city of San Diego's first ever State Championship. Along the way he collected numerous honors from California State POY to All-State and All-American. He ranked 22nd nationally by Parade All-America in the class of 1994. Sanford was voted the MVP of the San Diego City All-Star Challenge after managing a record 10 3pts on 13 attempts and amassing 48pts. In 1996 He was inducted into the San Diego Sports Hall of fame. In his brief High School Career he scored 2,373 points, grabbed 1059 rebounds, and 413 blocks.

== College career ==
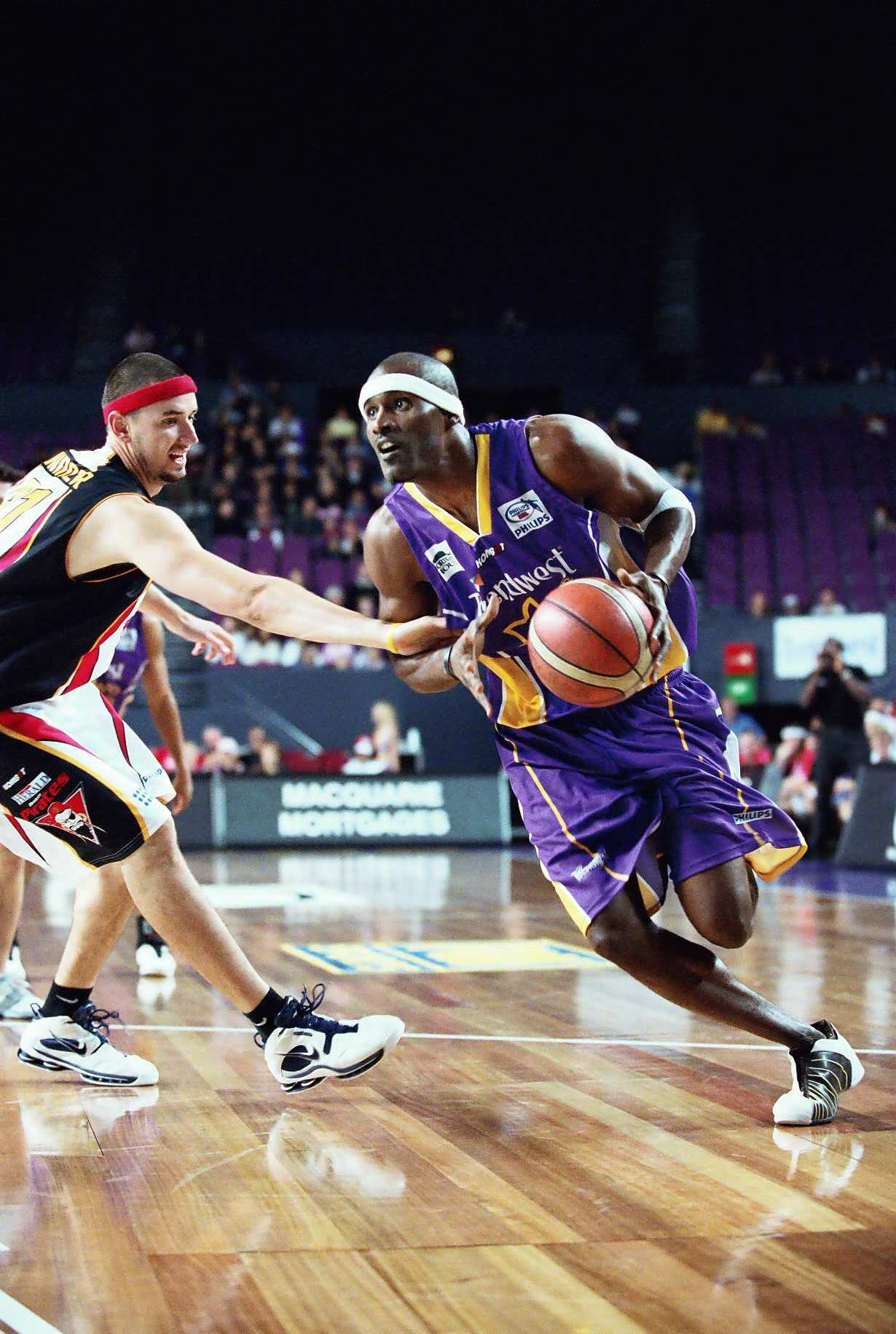
Mark Sanford goes on offense.

At the University of Washington, Sanford played for the Washington Huskies. He played three seasons with the team before he entered the 1997 NBA draft. Originally, Sanford had intended to declare for the 1996 NBA draft, but he withdrew his name from consideration. He played a total of 82 games for the Huskies scoring 1319 career point.

It did not take Sanford long to get into the Husky record books by scoring 15 points as a true Freshman in the 1st game/start of his career. In doing so he amassed the most points ever by a player in their 1st game. He was the fastest Husky to score 500 points doing so in just 32 games. He amassed 27 career 20+ point games and scored his career high of 35 points twice against USC and Jackson State, both during his sophomore year.

Sanford led the huskies in both scoring and rebounding in his Sophomore and Junior seasons. In his true Freshman year, he led all Pac-10 Freshman in scoring and rebounding with 14.5ppg, 5.7rpg. After his Freshman year he was invited to try out for the Under 19 Junior World Games in Athens, Greece. At the trials amongst other notable player such as Allen Iverson, Ray Allen, Kerry Kittles, Vince Carter, Stephon Marbury, Tim Duncan, and Marcus Camby, Sanford finished in the top 3 in 5 statistical categories (1st-scoring, 1st-steals, 2nd blocks, 2nd-FGP, 3rd-rebounds) becoming the first player to rank as high since Charles Barkley who finished number 1 in the same five categories.

He is the first player to ever leave the University of Washington early for the NBA draft. He was ranked 13th on Washington's all-time scoring list after only 3 seasons and 82 games played. He was a dunker capable of bringing fans out of their homes on a rainy December evening and into Edmundson Pavilion.

During Sanford's tenure at Washington, season-ticket sales increased nearly 11.8 percent. Prior to his sophomore season, Washington sold 3,261 men's season tickets. His junior season, 3,701 were sold. Twelve Washington games appeared on cable television, while two aired on network TV. The Huskies sold-out home crowds against top-ranked Cincinnati, No. 11 Arizona and No. 13 UCLA.

When asked about the support and exposure for the program Sanford stated, "We've finally got the exposure this year after years when nobody cared too much about Washington basketball." He went on to say, "Now that we got the exposure and expectations, we need to win."

For his career he was a two-time first-team All-Pac-10 selection and first-team All-Freshman. He was also an All-American selection following his Junior year. He's scored 1,000 points faster than any other Washington player, but his place in UW history is largely unknown. When his career ended, he became widely remembered for his role in reviving Husky men's basketball. With one step he was known to have a 41-inch leap, able to reach as high as 12 feet 4 inches.

== Harlem Globetrotters ==
In 1999, during the strike-shortened NBA lockout season, Sanford opted to join the Harlem Globetrotters. For his jumping ability, he earned the nickname "Airplane".

== NBA ==
Sanford was projected to be drafted as high as #11 to the Sacramento Kings in the 1997 NBA draft. Former Sacramento Kings Head Coach Eddie Jordan said that he thought that Sanford was the best defender in college basketball and compared him offensively to Billy Owens. After putting Sanford through a workout, former Indiana Pacers Head Coach Larry Bird stated that he thought that "Mark Sanford was the most athletic and skilled player that he had seen enter the draft in the last 5 years". Bird also declared that, had Sanford stayed in school for his senior season, he would have been projected as a top-3 draft pick.

Sanford would later watched his stock plummet in the days prior to the draft after being involved in a confrontation with his then agent. As a result of the confrontation, questions about his character arose and he was eventually selected with the second pick in the second round (30th overall) by the Miami Heat. He signed a guaranteed contract in July for the 1997–98 season. Two weeks before training camp began Sanford tore his plantar fascias. After failing to play through the injury with the Miami Heat, he was released following training camp.

In 1999, he signed a league minimum contract with the Sacramento Kings going by his middle name Tywan. He suffered another injury in training camp and was released upon his return. In 2002 Sanford re-entered the NBA with the New Jersey Nets on another non-guaranteed contract after turning down two other non-guaranteed offers in previous years with Utah and New Jersey. He sustained another injury and left the NBA for good after his recovery midway through the season. Although his NBA career ended without ever playing in a regular season game. He did go on to have a strong international playing career.

== International ==
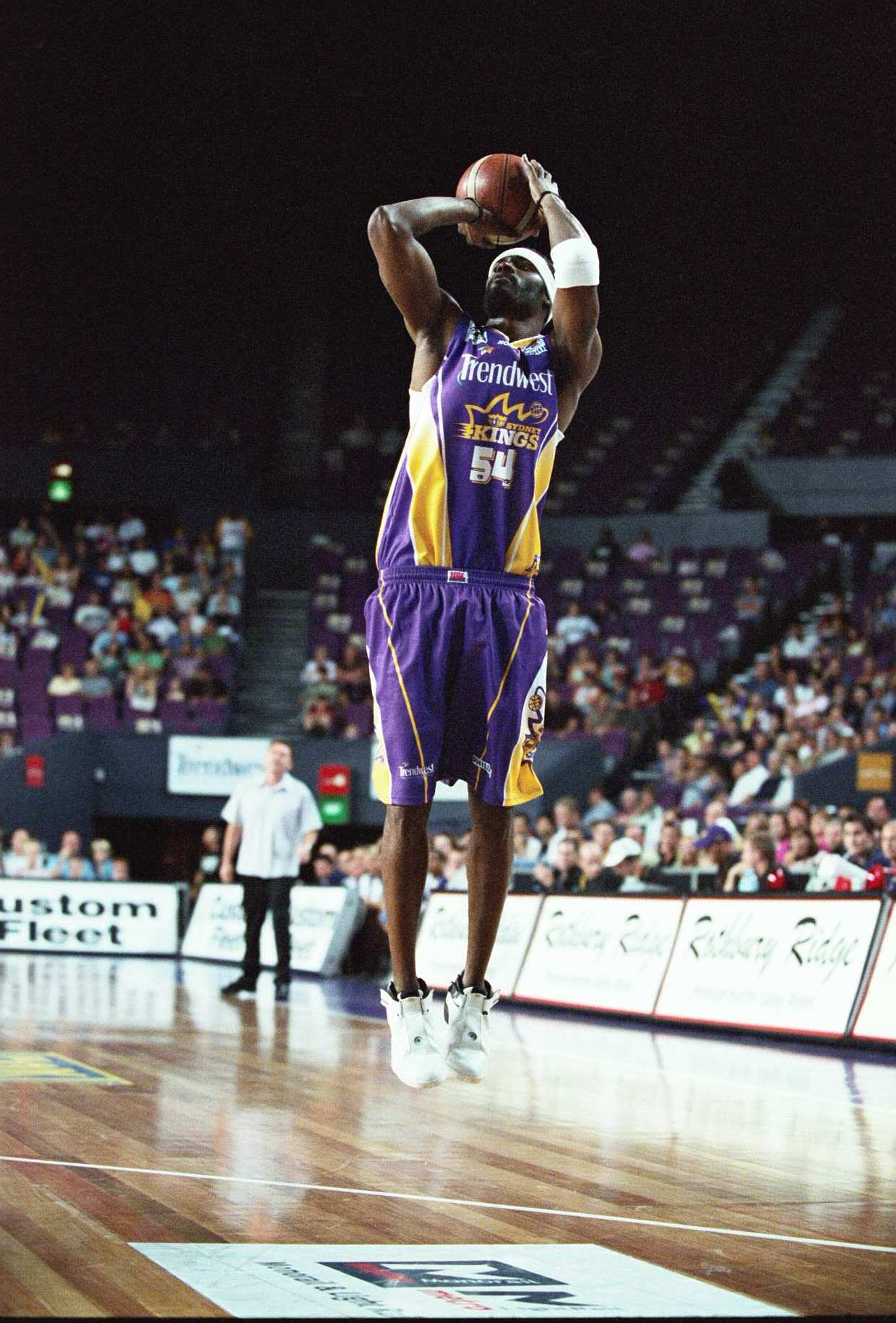
Mark Sanford in midair.

In 2001 Sanford received an offer to play for Frankfurt of the Euroleague a week after he signed a contract to play in Japan. He won four International Championships and appeared in seven international finals.

He would often use his mid-range jumper and quick first step to beat defenders to the rim or creating space to get off a jumper. Sanford has played basketball internationally for several clubs outside the US, including France, Belgium, Spain, the Philippines, Japan, and Australia, in which he played for the Sydney Kings of the National Basketball League (Australia)..

His career scoring and rebounding averages in Europe and Asia combined are 24.4 points and 11.2 rebounds.. He has helped four teams win the Championship while failing in three other attempts..

For his international career he has twenty-two 40+ point games and three games of more than 50 points with a career high of 57. Over a six-year period he had at least one game in which he scored 40+ points. That streak expanded over nine different countries.. He once scored 41 points in three quarters of a game while making 10 of 11 from three-point range and had another game in which he scored 51 points in 36 minutes. In another game he scored 32 straight points for his team expanding over two quarters finishing with 47 points. He had numerous 30+ points game in which he did not attempt a free throw.

== Coaching career ==
=== College coaching career ===
Sanford begun his coaching career in 2009 as a volunteer Assistant Coach for the 13th-ranked Men's team at Northwood University (Florida Campus) under legendary Hall of Fame head coach Rollie Massimino. That year Coach Massimino put Sanford in charge of strength & conditioning and player development. He also assisted in breaking down game film on their opponents and game planning. In his second year at Northwood Sanford became a full-time assistant coach. He took on more duties as the Seahawks shot to No. 1 in the country going 27–3 in the regular season. The 2010-11 Seahawks would finish the postseason ranked No. 2 with a 32–4 record and a loss in the final 4. One player would be named Player Of The Year while two players were named to the All-America team.

In 2011 Sanford was named the Head Women's Basketball Coach at Northwood University (Florida Campus). After taking over a program with a record of 4-26 and that finished last in The Sun Conference with a 1–13 record, in Sanford's two seasons at Northwood he compiled a win–loss record of 25–33. His Sun Conference record in two seasons was an impressive 18–10. The Seahawks finished in 3rd place in the two seasons that Sanford was named head coach. His up-tempo fast breaking and full-court pressing and trapping system saw 4 different players at 4 different positions be named to the Sun Conference All-Conference team, with 2 of the 4 players also being named Sun Conference Newcomer of the year in consecutive seasons. One of the 2 newcomers was also named Sun Conference Defensive Player of the Year after ranking in the top 5 nationally in steals. His teams would also see two different PG's in consecutive seasons lead the conference in assist and two different players in consecutive seasons lead the conference in steals.

=== NBA coaching career ===
In 2013 Sanford allowed for the Memphis Grizzlies to created the position of Player Development Coach when he accepted an offer from Head Coach Dave Joeger to join his coaching staff. He accepted the position of Lead Player Development Coach and Assistant Video Coordinator.

During his 3 years with the Grizzlies he served many positions. Along with Player Development and Assistant Video Coordinator he also worked as a College Scout, Pro Personnel Scout, NBA Draft Evaluation, and Advanced Scout.

== College statistics ==
- 1994–1995: Washington (NCAA): 14.5ppg, 5.7rpg
- 1995–1996: Washington (NCAA): 16.5ppg, 6.1rpg
- 1996–1997: Washington (NCAA): 17ppg, 8rpg

== European career and statistics ==
- 1998: Sunair Oostende (Belgium), was signed in Mar.'1998: 18.1ppg, 6.4rpg
- 1998–1999: La Crosse Bobcats (CBA): 4 games, 2.7ppg 1.2rpg, in Mar.'99 signed with Harlem Globetrotters for the summer season
- 2000: in December 1999 was signed by Évreux (France-ProA), but injured after 1 game: 21 pts 11 rebs, (dislocated shoulder) replaced in March 2000 by Dathon Brown due to injury: 13 games: 12.3 ppg, 3.4 rpg
- 2000–2001: Great Danes Magic (Denmark): the team created just for NEBL games: 27.3 ppg, 13.3 rpg, 2.1 apb, 2.1 spg, 1.8 blpg
- 2001– Los Angeles Stars (ABA, starting five): 17 ppg, 5.9 rpg, 1.8 apg, 1.2 spg, 2FGP 49%, 3FGP 40.3%, FT 80.1%
- 2001: In June signed with Los Potros de Villa Francisca (DominicanRepublic): 14 games: 24.4 ppg, 11.1 rpg, 2FGP 47%, 3FGP 41%, FT 72%
- 2001–2002: At the beginning of season was signed by Matsushita Electric Panasonic Kangaroos (Japan-Superleague): Score-4 (24.5 ppg), 9.3 rpg, 3.1 apg, 2.2 spg, 2FGP 51%, 3FGP 38%, FT 73%
- 2003: Played for Hapoel Tel Aviv (Israel-Premier League): 3 games: 12.3 ppg, 4.0 rpg, 2 ast, 1.0 spg, FIBA Champions Cup: 2 games: 16.0 ppg, 6.5 rpg, 1.0 apg, 2.5 spg, but decided not to join, in March 2003 agreed terms with CPN Pueblo Nuevo (Dominican Republic): 30.2 ppg, 12.7 rpg, 1.8 bpg, 2.1 apg, 2.3 spg, 2FGP 52%, 3FGP 43%
- 2003: In April was signed by Cocodrilos de Caracas (Venezuela-LPB):never played a game due to injury received in finals of Dominican Republic
- 2003–2004: In November 2003 signed at C.B. Aracena-Ponts (Spain-LEB1): 10 games: 12.7 ppg, 4.7 rpg
- 2004: Coca-Cola Tigers (Philippines-PBA): Score-3 (28.8 ppg) 12.7 rpg, 2.3 apg, 1.4 spg, 6 games of 40 plus points and 1 game of 51 pts, 2FGP 43%, 3FGP 36% FT 63%
- 2004–2005: At the beginning of season signed at Sydney Kings (Australia-NBL): 36 games: 16.7 ppg, 7.4 rpg, 1.4 apg, 1.2 spg, in May 2005 moved back to Coca-Cola Tigers (Philippines-PBA): Fiesta Conf: 10 games: Score-3 (24.6 ppg), 14.0 rpg, 3.0 apg, steals-3 (1.7 spg), 1.0 bpg, 2FGP 42.3%, 3FGP 29.4%, FT 54.7%
- 2005–2006: Sagesse - Al Hekmeh Beirut (Lebanon-Div.A), tested in Oct.'05, but chose not to sign, in January 2006 joined Sioux Falls Skyforce (CBA, starting five): 24 games: 15.0 ppg, 5.5 rpg, 1.5 apg, 0.9 spg, FG 47.9%, 3PT 31.8%, FT 69.3%
- 2006: Dubai- 12 games: 33 ppg, 19 rpg, 4 blk, FG 52.7%, 3pt 41.1%, FT 79.7%
- 2006: Plaza Fernando Valerio (Dominican Republic-SRT)
- 2007: In January signed at Panteras de Miranda (Venezuela-LPB, starting five)
- 2007–2008: Before the season signed at Daegu Orions (Korea-KBL), but did not play due to an injury

== Awards and achievements ==
- Texas State Co-Sophomore of the year -92
- Dallas 2nd Team All DISD 10-5A -92
- Dallas 1st Team All DISD 10-5A -93
- Texas State 2nd Team All-State -93
- Gatorade All-American Nominee-93
- Blue Chip All-American Nominee -93
- High School McDonald's All-American Nominee-94
- Gatorade All-American -94
- Blue Chip All American -94
- Division 4 California State POY -94
- California State All-Star Game -94
- San Diego City All-Star Challenge MVP -94
- All State California-94
- Division 4 State Champion Lincoln Prep-94
- State Tournament MVP -94
- Pac10 All-Freshman Team -95
- Sporting News NCAA All-Freshman Team 2nd -95
- USA Under 19 World Games Athens Greece -95
- Pac10 2nd Team -Pre96
- Pac10 1st Team -96
- Pac10 1st Team -97
- Belgian Cup Winner -98
- Belgian Cup Tournament Most Outstanding Player -98
- Dominican Rep. League Champion -01
- Dominican Rep. Tournament MOP -01
- Dominican Rep. League Champion -02
- Dominican Rep. Tournament MOP -02
- Santiago Regional Tournament MVP -03
- Australian NBL Champion -05
- Australiabasket.com All-NBL Player of the Year -05
- Australiabasket.com All-NBL Forward of the Year -05
- Australiabasket.com All-NBL Import Player of the Year -05
- Australiabasket.com All-NBL 1st Team -05
- Australiabasket.com NBL All-Imports Team -05
- Assistant coach to NAIA College National Coach of the Year -11
