= Gordon Malone =

American basketball player (born 1974)

Gordon Malone (born July 17, 1974) raised in Brooklyn, New York, is a former basketball player who played college basketball for West Virginia University.

In high school, Malone was the most feared block specialist in the northeastern United States; he once blocked a ball so hard it popped, forcing officials to stop the game.

After playing for West Virginia, Malone was selected 43rd overall by the Minnesota Timberwolves in the 1997 NBA draft, but was cut in training camp. He subsequently played professional basketball in Greece, Poland, Argentina, China, and Canada, as well as for the Saskatchewan Hawks in the Continental Basketball Association and later the Strong Island Sound of the American Basketball Association. He also played with the Harlem Globetrotters.
