= 1997 NBA draft =

Basketball player selection

General information
- Sport: Basketball
- Date: June 25, 1997
- Location: Charlotte Coliseum (Charlotte, North Carolina)
- Network: TNT

Overview
- 57 total selections in 2 rounds
- League: NBA
- First selection: Tim Duncan (San Antonio Spurs)
- Hall of Famers: 3: PF Tim Duncan; PG Chauncey Billups; SG Tracy McGrady

The 1997 NBA draft took place on June 25, 1997, at Charlotte Coliseum in Charlotte, North Carolina. The Vancouver Grizzlies had the highest probability to win the NBA draft lottery, but since they were an expansion team along with the Toronto Raptors they were not allowed to select first in this draft. Although the Boston Celtics had the second-worst record in the 1996–97 season and the best odds (36 percent) of winning the lottery with two picks, the Spurs lost David Robinson and Sean Elliott to injury early in the season, finished with the third-worst record, and subsequently won the lottery. Leading up to the draft, there was no doubt that Tim Duncan would be selected at No. 1 by the Spurs as he was considered to be far and away the best prospect. After Duncan, the rest of the draft was regarded with some skepticism. The Celtics had the third and sixth picks, selecting Chauncey Billups and Ron Mercer, both of whom were traded in the next two years.

Duncan became the Spurs' franchise player and in a 19-year career spent entirely in San Antonio, he led the Spurs to five NBA championships, winning NBA Finals MVP in three of those campaigns. In addition, Duncan was a two-time NBA MVP, 15-time All-Star, 15-time All-NBA and 15-time All-Defensive team selection. Upon retiring after the 2015–16 season, Duncan was the last remaining active player from the 1997 draft. Billups went on to earn five All-Star selections and won Finals MVP honors in 2004 with the Detroit Pistons. The ninth pick, Tracy McGrady, captured two NBA scoring titles and was named to seven All-Star and All-NBA teams.

The Washington Wizards forfeited their 1997 first-round pick in connection with the signing of Juwan Howard. (Washington would have had the 17th pick.) Thus, the draft only had 28 first-round selections and 57 selections overall.

== Draft selections ==
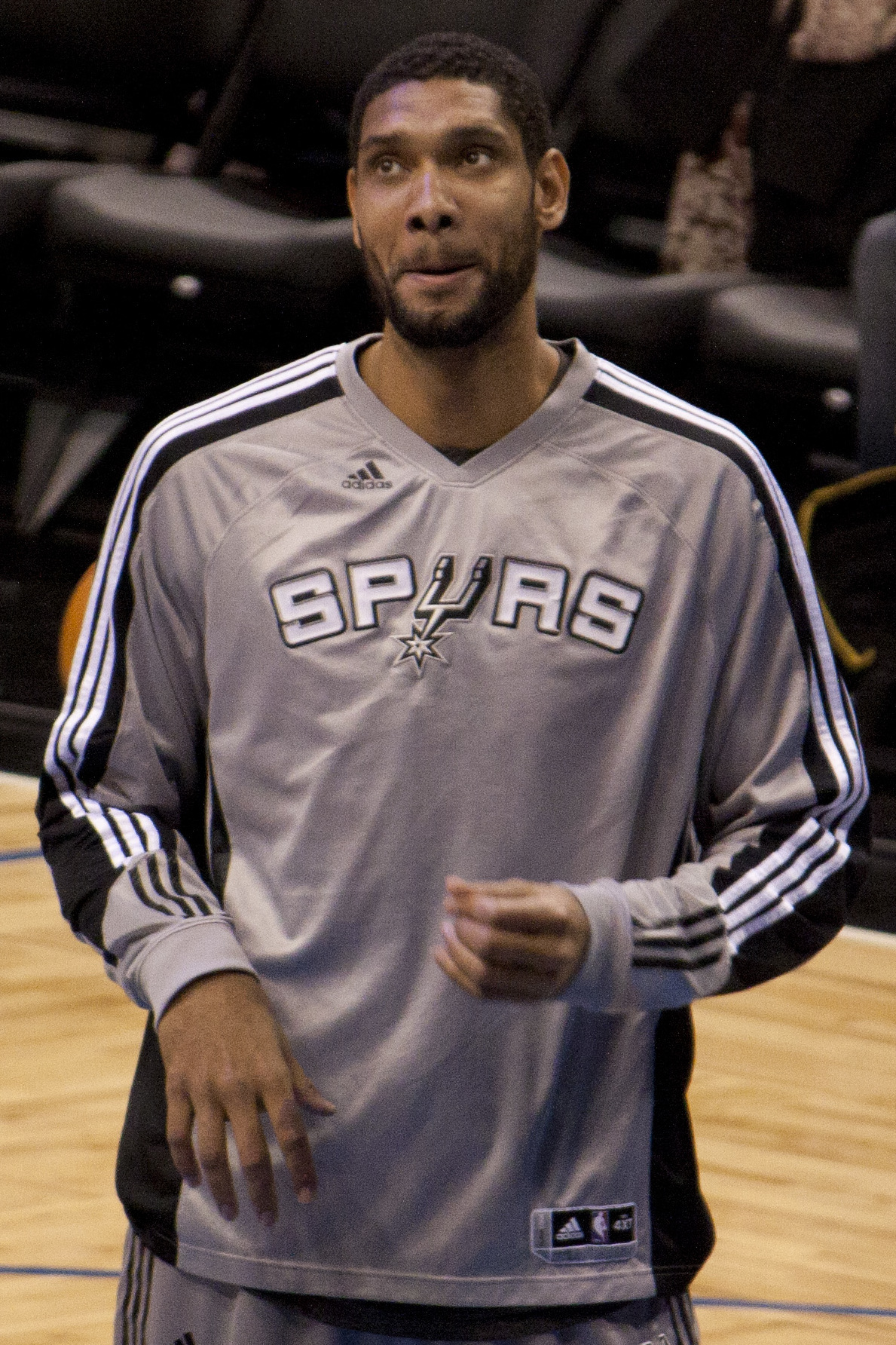
Tim Duncan was selected 1st overall by the San Antonio Spurs.

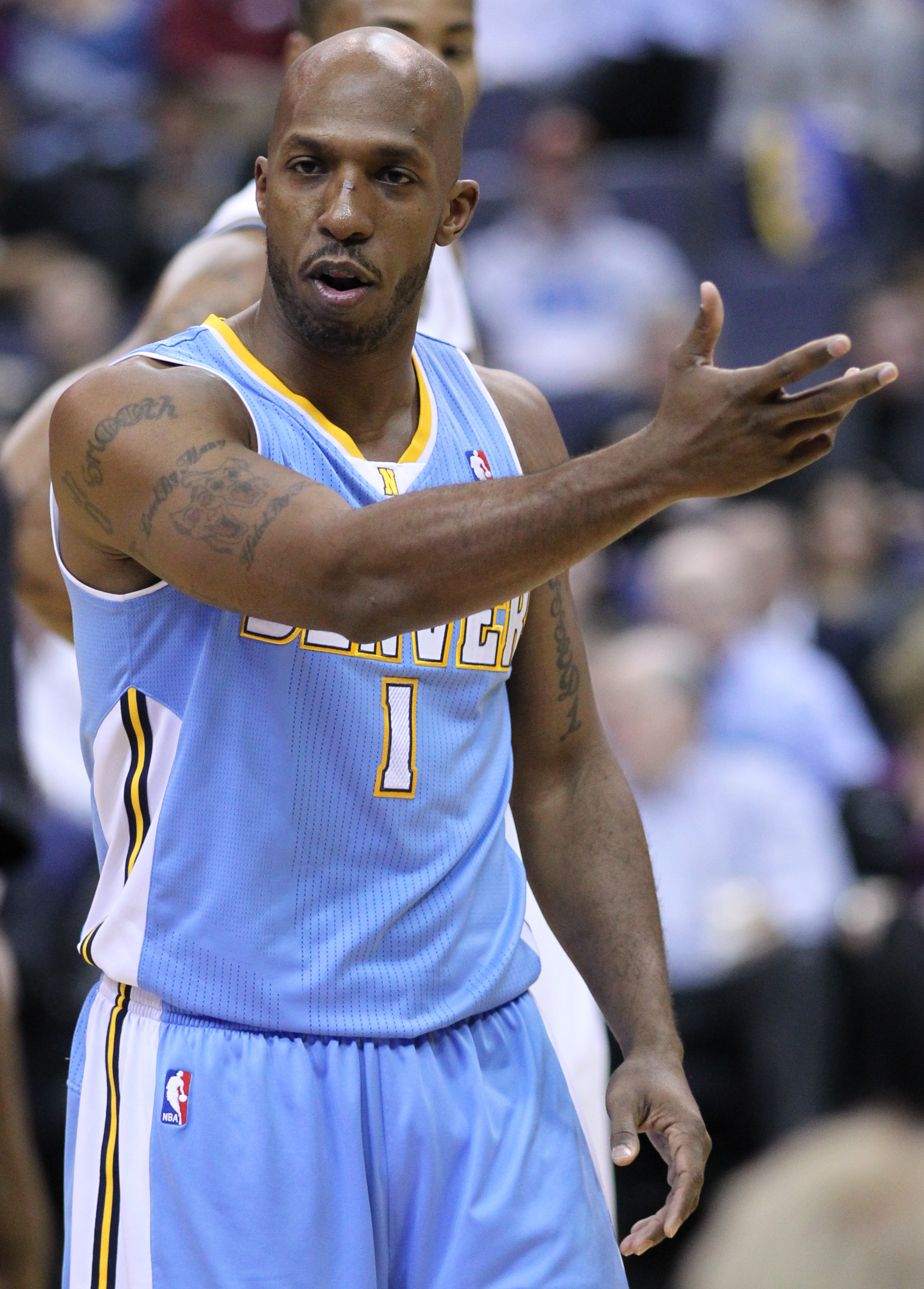
Chauncey Billups was selected 3rd overall by the Boston Celtics.

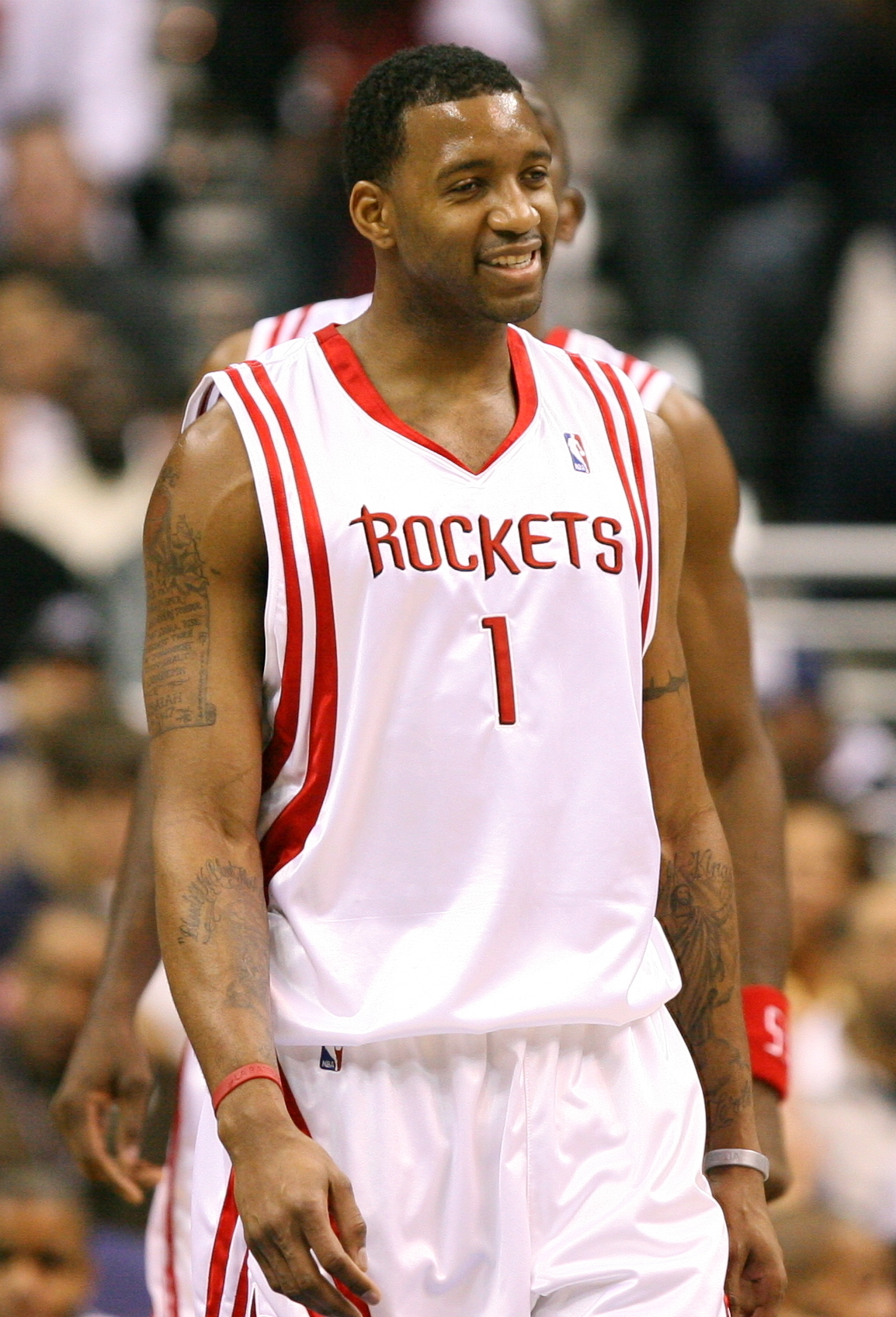
Tracy McGrady was selected 9th overall by the Toronto Raptors.

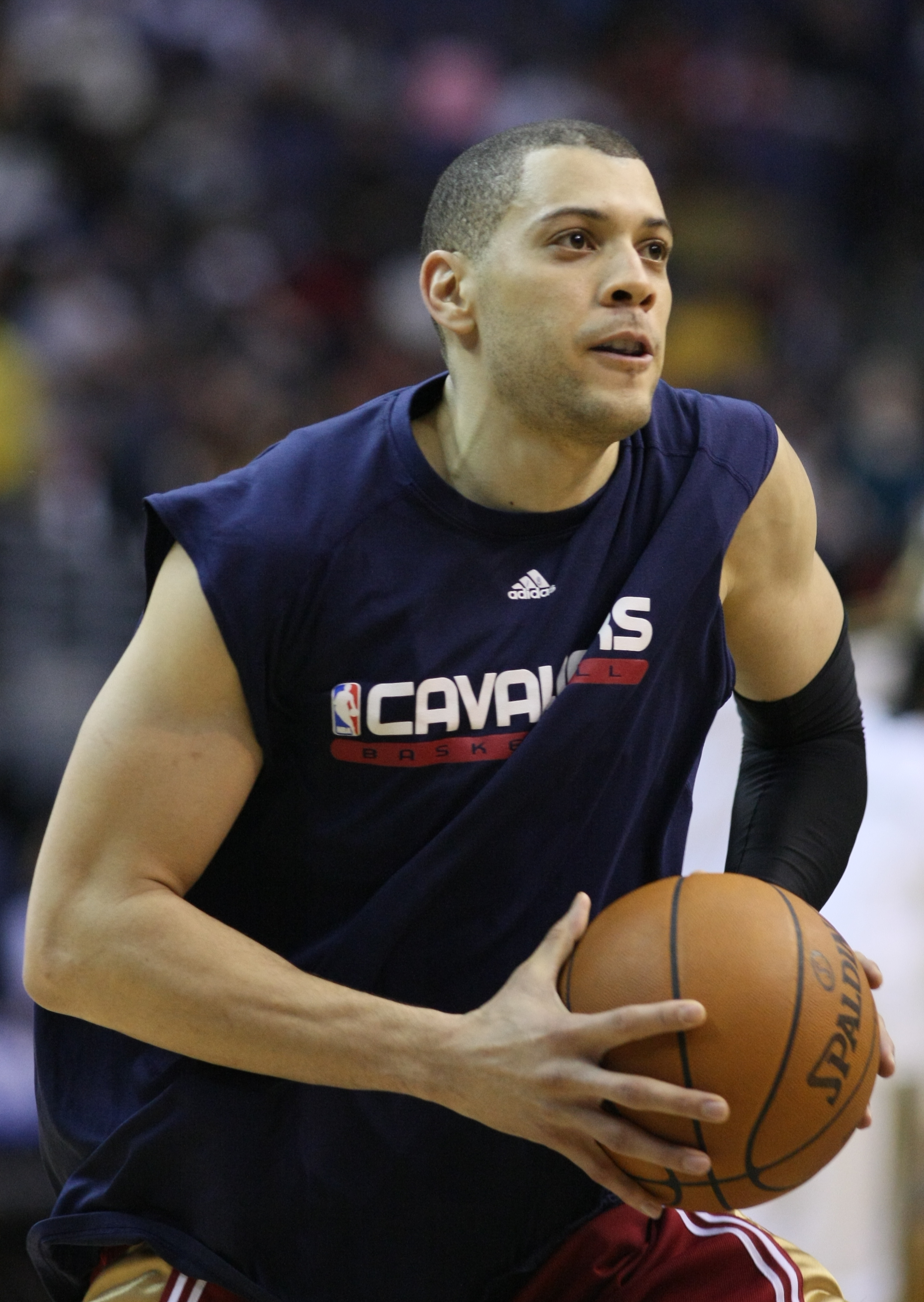
Anthony Parker was selected 21st overall by the New Jersey Nets.

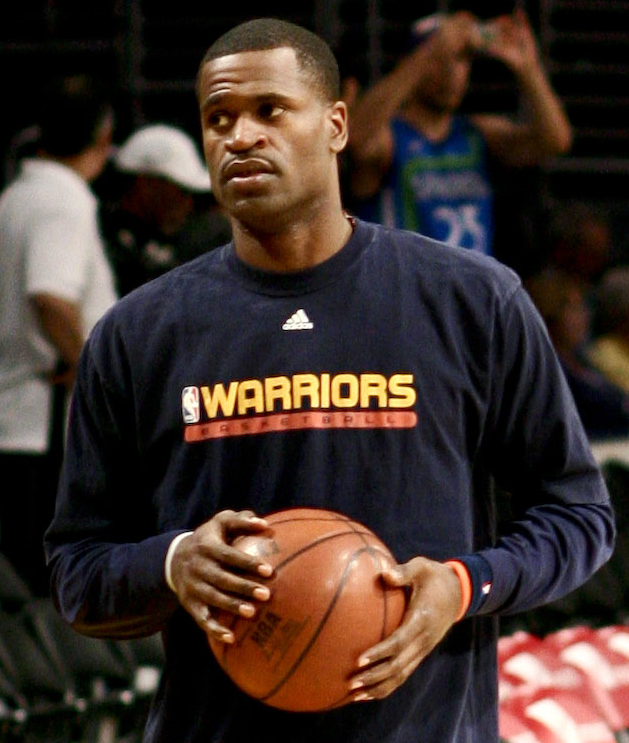
Stephen Jackson was selected 42nd overall by the Phoenix Suns.

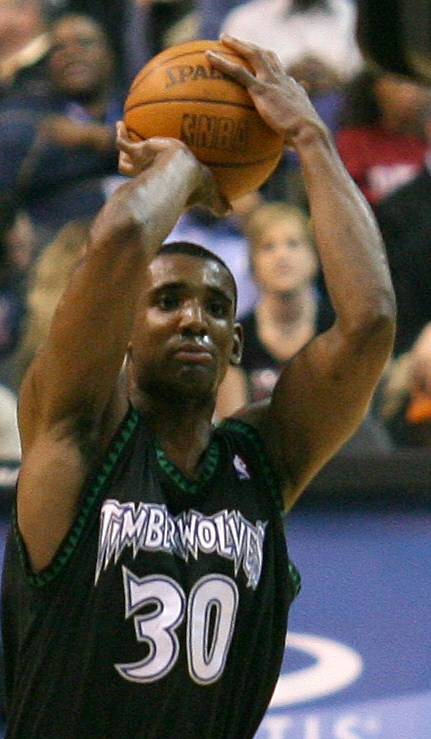
Mark Blount was selected 54th overall by the Seattle SuperSonics.

| PG | Point guard | SG | Shooting guard | SF | Small forward | PF | Power forward | C | Center |

| ^ | Denotes player who has been inducted to the Naismith Memorial Basketball Hall of Fame |
| * | Denotes player who has been selected for at least one All-Star Game and All-NBA Team |
| ^{+} | Denotes player who has been selected for at least one All-Star Game |
| ^{#} | Denotes player who has never appeared in an NBA regular-season or playoff game |
| ^{~} | Denotes player who has been selected as Rookie of the Year |

| Round | Pick | Player | Position | Nationality (Note: Nationality indicates the player's national team or representative nationality. If a player has not competed at the international level, then the nationality indicates the national team which the player is eligible to represent according to FIBA rules.) | NBA team | School/Club team |
|---|---|---|---|---|---|---|
| 1 | 1 | Tim Duncan^^{~} | PF/C | United States (Note: Tim Duncan is a United States citizen by birth, as are all natives of the U.S. Virgin Islands, he has represented the United States internationally.) | San Antonio Spurs | Wake Forest (Sr.) |
| 1 | 2 | Keith Van Horn | PF | United States | Philadelphia 76ers (traded to New Jersey) | Utah (Sr.) |
| 1 | 3 | Chauncey Billups^ | PG | United States | Boston Celtics | Colorado (So.) |
| 1 | 4 | Antonio Daniels | PG | United States | Vancouver Grizzlies | Bowling Green (Sr.) |
| 1 | 5 | Tony Battie | C/F | United States | Denver Nuggets | Texas Tech (Jr.) |
| 1 | 6 | Ron Mercer | SF | United States | Boston Celtics (from Dallas) | Kentucky (So.) |
| 1 | 7 | Tim Thomas | SF | United States | New Jersey Nets (traded to Philadelphia) | Villanova (Fr.) |
| 1 | 8 | Adonal Foyle | C | Saint Vincent and the Grenadines | Golden State Warriors | Colgate (Jr.) |
| 1 | 9 | Tracy McGrady^ | SG/SF | United States | Toronto Raptors | Mt. Zion Christian Academy (Durham, North Carolina) |
| 1 | 10 | Danny Fortson | PF | United States | Milwaukee Bucks (traded to Denver) | Cincinnati (Jr.) |
| 1 | 11 | Tariq Abdul-Wahad | SF | France | Sacramento Kings | San Jose State (Sr.) |
| 1 | 12 | Austin Croshere | PF | United States | Indiana Pacers | Providence (Sr.) |
| 1 | 13 | Derek Anderson | SG | United States | Cleveland Cavaliers | Kentucky (Sr.) |
| 1 | 14 | Maurice Taylor | PF | United States | Los Angeles Clippers | Michigan (Jr.) |
| 1 | 15 | Kelvin Cato | C | United States | Dallas Mavericks (from Minnesota) | Iowa State (Jr.) |
| 1 | 16 | Brevin Knight | PG | United States | Cleveland Cavaliers (from Phoenix) | Stanford (Sr.) |
| 1 | 17 | Johnny Taylor | PF | United States | Orlando Magic | Chattanooga (Sr.) |
| 1 | 18 | Chris Anstey | PF | Australia | Portland Trail Blazers | SE Melbourne Magic (Australia) |
| 1 | 19 | Scot Pollard | C | United States | Detroit Pistons | Kansas (Sr.) |
| 1 | 20 | Paul Grant | C | United States | Minnesota Timberwolves (from Charlotte via Milwaukee and Portland) | Wisconsin (Sr.) |
| 1 | 21 | Anthony Parker | SG | United States | New Jersey Nets (from L.A. Lakers; traded to Philadelphia) | Bradley (Sr.) |
| 1 | 22 | Ed Gray | PG/SG | United States | Atlanta Hawks | California (Sr.) |
| 1 | 23 | Bobby Jackson | PG | United States | Seattle SuperSonics | Minnesota (Sr.) |
| 1 | 24 | Rodrick Rhodes | SG | United States | Houston Rockets | USC (Sr.) |
| 1 | 25 | John Thomas | C | United States | New York Knicks | Minnesota (Sr.) |
| 1 | 26 | Charles Smith | SG | United States | Miami Heat | New Mexico (Sr.) |
| 1 | 27 | Jacque Vaughn | PG | United States | Utah Jazz | Kansas (Sr.) |
| 1 | 28 | Keith Booth | SF | United States | Chicago Bulls | Maryland (Sr.) |
| 2 | 29 | Serge Zwikker^{#} | C | Netherlands | Houston Rockets (from Vancouver) | North Carolina (Sr.) |
| 2 | 30 | Mark Sanford^{#} | SF/PF | United States | Miami Heat (from Boston) | Washington (Jr.) |
| 2 | 31 | Charles O'Bannon | PG | United States | Detroit Pistons (from San Antonio) | UCLA (Sr.) |
| 2 | 32 | James Cotton | SF | United States | Denver Nuggets | Long Beach State (Sr.) |
| 2 | 33 | Marko Milič | PG/SG | Slovenia | Philadelphia 76ers | Smelt Olimpija (Slovenia) |
| 2 | 34 | Bubba Wells | SF/PF | United States | Dallas Mavericks | Austin Peay (Sr.) |
| 2 | 35 | Kebu Stewart | SF/PF | United States | Philadelphia 76ers (from New Jersey Nets) | Cal State Bakersfield (Sr.) |
| 2 | 36 | James Collins | PG/SG | United States | Philadelphia 76ers(from Toronto) | Florida State (Sr.) |
| 2 | 37 | Marc Jackson | SF/PF | United States | Golden State Warriors | Temple (Sr.) |
| 2 | 38 | Jerald Honeycutt | PF | United States | Milwaukee Bucks | Tulane (Sr.) |
| 2 | 39 | Anthony Johnson | PG/SG | United States | Sacramento Kings | College of Charleston (Sr.) |
| 2 | 40 | Ed Elisma^{#} | SF | United States | Seattle SuperSonics(from L.A. Clippers) | Georgia Tech (Sr.) |
| 2 | 41 | Jason Lawson | C | United States | Denver Nuggets(from Indiana) | Villanova (Sr.) |
| 2 | 42 | Stephen Jackson | SG | United States | Phoenix Suns | Butler CC (Fr.) |
| 2 | 43 | Gordon Malone^{#} | SF | United States | Minnesota Timberwolves | West Virginia (Sr.) |
| 2 | 44 | Cedric Henderson | PF | United States | Cleveland Cavaliers | Memphis (Sr.) |
| 2 | 45 | God Shammgod | PG | United States | Washington Wizards | Providence (So.) |
| 2 | 46 | Eric Washington | SG | United States | Orlando Magic(traded to Denver) | Alabama (Sr.) |
| 2 | 47 | Alvin Williams | PG | United States | Portland Trail Blazers | Villanova (Sr.) |
| 2 | 48 | Predrag Drobnjak | C | FR Yugoslavia | Washington Wizards (from Charlotte) | KK Partizan (Yugoslavia) |
| 2 | 49 | Alain Digbeu^{#} | SG | France | Atlanta Hawks(from Detroit) | ASVEL Lyon-Villeurbanne (France) |
| 2 | 50 | Chris Crawford | SF | United States | Atlanta Hawks | Marquette (Sr.) |
| 2 | 51 | DeJuan Wheat | PG | United States | Los Angeles Lakers | Louisville (Sr.) |
| 2 | 52 | C.J. Bruton^{#} | PG/SG | Australia | Vancouver Grizzlies(from Houston) | Indian Hills CC (So.) |
| 2 | 53 | Paul Rogers^{#} | C | Australia | Los Angeles Lakers (from New York) | Gonzaga (Sr.) |
| 2 | 54 | Mark Blount | C | United States | Seattle SuperSonics | Pittsburgh (So.) |
| 2 | 55 | Ben Pepper^{#} | C | Australia | Boston Celtics (from Miami) | Newcastle Falcons (Australia) |
| 2 | 56 | Nate Erdmann^{#} | SG | United States | Utah Jazz | Oklahoma (Senior) |
| 2 | 57 | Roberto Dueñas^{#} | C | Spain | Chicago Bulls | FC Barcelona (Spain) |

== Notable undrafted players ==
These players eligible for the 1997 NBA Draft were not selected but played in the NBA.

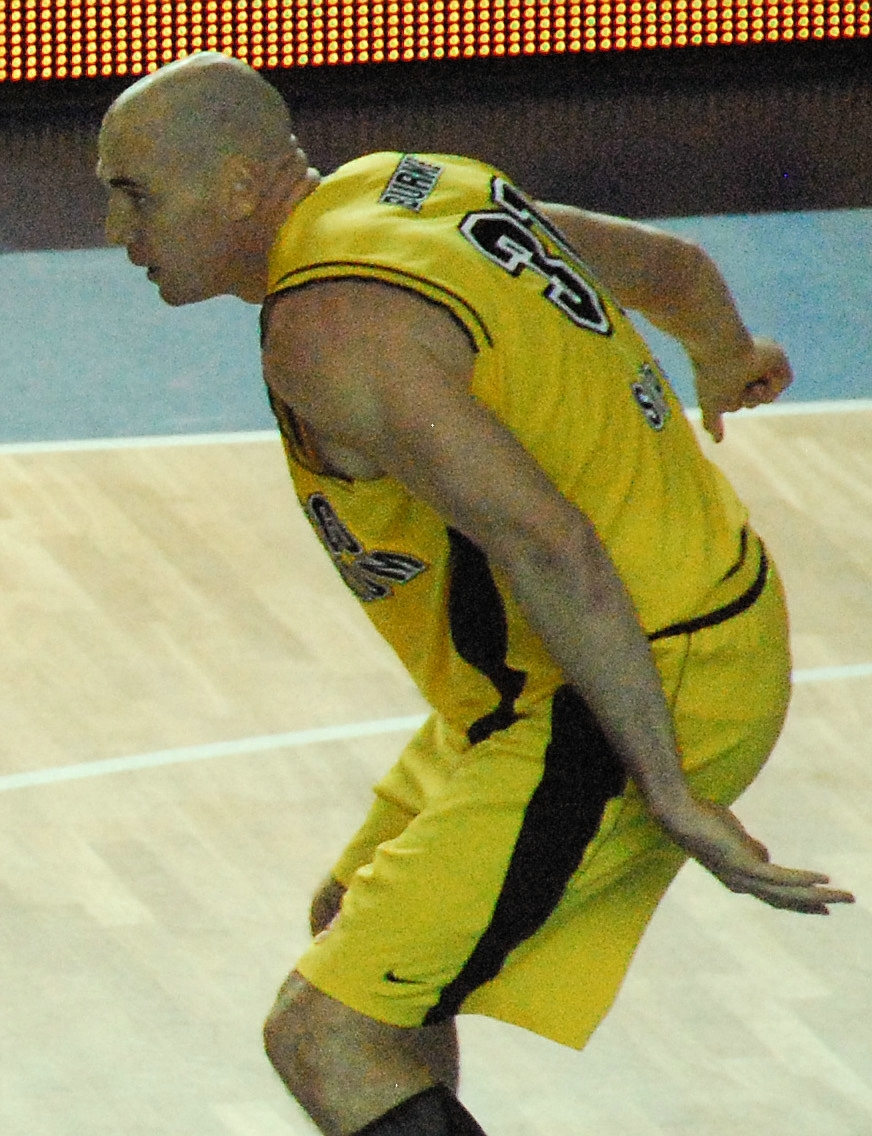
Despite going undrafted Pat Burke gained notability through being the NBA's first Irish player.

| Player | Pos. | Nationality | School/Club team |
|---|---|---|---|
| Peter Aluma | C | Nigeria | Liberty (Sr.) |
| Mengke Bateer | C | China | Beijing Ducks (China) |
| Etdrick Bohannon | F | United States | Auburn Montgomery (Sr.) |
| Pat Burke | C | Ireland | Auburn (Sr.) |
| Keith Closs | C | United States | Norwich Neptunes (Atlantic Basketball Association) |
| Reggie Freeman | SG | United States | Texas (Sr.) |
| Rubén Garcés | PF/C | Panama | Providence (Sr.) |
| Chris Garner | PG | United States | Memphis (Sr.) |
| Marlon Garnett | G | United States | Santa Clara (Sr.) |
| Kiwane Garris | PG | United States | Illinois (Sr.) |
| Derek Grimm | SF | United States | Missouri (Sr.) |
| Troy Hudson | G | United States | Southern Illinois (Jr.) |
| Nate Huffman | C | United States | Central Michigan (Sr.) |
| Damon Jones | G | United States | Houston (Jr.) |
| Garth Joseph | C | Dominica | The College of Saint Rose (Sr.) |
| Jonathan Kerner | PF | United States | East Carolina (Sr.) |
| Mikki Moore | F/C | United States | Nebraska (Sr.) |
| Ira Newble | F | United States | Miami (Ohio) (Sr.) |
| Fabricio Oberto | C | Argentina | Atenas (Argentina) |
| Mike Penberthy | G | United States | The Master's (Sr.) |
| Jamal Robinson | SF | United States | Virginia (Sr.) |
| Shea Seals | SG | United States | Tulsa (Sr.) |
| Alvin Sims | SG | United States | Louisville (Sr.) |
| Michael Stewart | F/C | United States | California (Sr.) |
| Dedric Willoughby | PG | United States | Iowa State (Sr.) |
| Trevor Winter | C | United States | Minnesota (Sr.) |

== Early entrants ==
=== College underclassmen ===
This year saw a continued rise of collegiate underclassmen and other players of similar nature declaring entry into the NBA draft. This year initially saw a total of 47 eligible players enter the draft at first, but seven of these players (including Cory Carr from Texas Tech University, former DePaul University player Ronnie Fields from the St. Paul Slam! in the International Basketball Association, the Greek born Dimitrios Papanikolaou of the Olympiacos Piraeus B.C. in Greece, Larell Redic from Utah State University, Dawood Thomas from the California University of Pennsylvania, the Turkish-Yugoslavian born Mirsad Türkcan of the Efes Pilsen in Turkey, and the Argentinian-Spanish born Lucas Victoriano of the Olimpia Venado Tuerto in Argentina) would later decline their entry for this year's draft. Including the likes of high school phenom Tracy McGrady from Mount Zion Christian Academy, the Slovenian born Marko Milič of the Smelt Olimpija in Slovenia, and former Central Connecticut State University player Keith Closs of the Norwich Neptunes from the Atlantic Basketball Association minor league, the number of qualified underclassmen would increase from 37 only in college to 40 total players. Regardless, the following college basketball players successfully applied for early draft entrance.

- (United States) Gracen Averil – G, Texas Tech (junior)
- (United States) Tony Battie – F/C, Texas Tech (junior)
- (United States) Chauncey Billups – G, Colorado (sophomore)
- (United States) Carl Blanton – F, Sinclair CC (junior)
- (United States) Mark Blount – C/F, Pittsburgh (sophomore)
- (Australia) C. J. Bruton – G, Indian Hills CC (sophomore)
- (United States) Dan Buie – F, Washburn (junior)
- (United States) James Cotton – G, Long Beach State (junior)
- (United States) Tony Doyle – F, Columbia (junior)
- (United States) Ian Folmar – F, Slippery Rock (junior)
- (United States) Danny Fortson – F, Cincinnati (junior)
- (Saint Vincent and the Grenadines) Adonal Foyle – C/F, Colgate (junior)
- (United States) Darryl Hardy – F, Winston–Salem State (junior)
- (United States) Antjonne Holmes – F, Central Baptist (freshman)
- (United States) Troy Hudson – G, Southern Illinois (junior)
- (United States) Marc Jackson – F/C, Temple
- (United States) Stephen Jackson – F/G, Butler CC (freshman)
- (United States) Ed Jenkins – F, Ohio State (junior)
- (United States) Marcus Johnson – F, Long Beach State (junior)
- (United States) Damon Jones – G, Houston (junior)
- (United States) Nate Langley – G, George Mason (junior)
- (United States) Keith Love – G, Rosary (junior)
- (United States) Gordon Malone – F, West Virginia (junior)
- (United States) Amere May – F, Shaw (junior)
- (United States) Elgie McCoy – F, Kutztown (junior)
- (United States) Ron Mercer – G/F, Kentucky (sophomore)
- (United States) Victor Page – G, Georgetown (sophomore)
- (United States) Shawn Ritzie – G, Norwalk CC (sophomore)
- (Australia) Paul Rogers – F/C, Gonzaga (junior)
- (United States) Bryon Ruffner – F, BYU (junior)
- (France) Olivier Saint-Jean – San Jose State (junior)
- (United States) Mark Sanford – F, Washington (junior)
- (United States) God Shammgod – G, Providence (sophomore)
- (United States) Maurice Taylor – F, Michigan (junior)
- (United States) Tim Thomas – F, Villanova (freshman)
- (United States) Mark Young – F, Kansas State (junior)

=== High school players ===
This would be the third year in a row where high school players were allowed entry into the NBA draft after previously only doing it back in 1975. However, only one player would go directly from high school to enter the NBA this year. The following high school player successfully applied for early draft entrance.

- (United States) Tracy McGrady – G/F, Mount Zion Christian Academy (Durham, North Carolina)

=== International players ===
This year, only one international born player would officially enter the NBA draft after seeing three other international players initially declare their interest in entering this year's draft. The following international player successfully applied for early draft entrance.

- Marko Milič – G/F, Smelt Olimpija (Slovenia)

=== Other eligible players ===
This year marked the third time in NBA history (the first two times being in 1971 and 1987) that an eligible underclassman player of sorts would declare entry for an NBA draft by playing minor league basketball within the U.S.A. first (as well as have it be the first time that it wouldn't involve the Continental Basketball Association or its previous name in the Eastern Basketball Association). It would also be the fourth time that a player would declare entry while also playing in another American basketball league, with the second case of this occurring in 1973 with David Brent being allowed entry into the NBA draft despite him already playing for the Carolina Cougars of the rivaling American Basketball Association at the time.

| Player | Team | Note | Ref. |
|---|---|---|---|
| (United States) Keith Closs | Norwich Neptunes (Atlantic Basketball Association) | Left Central Connecticut in 1996; playing professionally since the 1996–97 season | |

== Invited attendees ==
The 1997 NBA draft is considered to be the twentieth NBA draft to have utilized what's properly considered the "green room" experience for NBA prospects. The NBA's green room is a staging area where anticipated draftees often sit with their families and representatives, waiting for their names to be called on draft night. Often being positioned either in front of or to the side of the podium (in this case, being positioned somewhere within the Charlotte Coliseum), once a player heard his name, he would walk to the podium to shake hands and take promotional photos with the NBA commissioner. From there, the players often conducted interviews with various media outlets while backstage. From there, the players often conducted interviews with various media outlets while backstage. However, once the NBA draft started to air nationally on TV starting with the 1980 NBA draft, the green room evolved from players waiting to hear their name called and then shaking hands with these select players who were often called to the hotel to take promotional pictures with the NBA commissioner a day or two after the draft concluded to having players in real-time waiting to hear their names called up and then shaking hands with David Stern, the NBA's commissioner at the time. The NBA compiled its list of green room invites through collective voting by the NBA's team presidents and general managers alike, which in this year's case belonged to only what they believed were the top 15 prospects at the time. Surprisingly, outside of the missing inclusion of Danny Fortson being the tenth pick of the draft, this would be the most accurate green room draft invitation group yet. With that in mind, the following players were invited to attend this year's draft festivities live and in person.

- (United States) Derek Anderson – SG, Kentucky
- (United States) Tony Battie – PF/C, Texas Tech
- (United States) Chauncey Billups – PG, Colorado
- (United States) Kelvin Cato – C, Iowa State
- (United States) Austin Croshere – PF, Providence
- (United States) Antonio Daniels – PG, Bowling Green
- (United States Virgin Islands) / (United States) Tim Duncan – C, Wake Forest
- (Saint Vincent and the Grenadines) Adonal Foyle – C, Colgate
- (United States) Brevin Knight – PG, Stanford
- (United States) Tracy McGrady – SG/SF, Mount Zion Christian Academy (Durham, North Carolina)
- (United States) Ron Mercer – SF, Kentucky
- (France) Olivier Saint-Jean – SF, San Jose State
- (United States) Maurice Taylor – PF, Michigan
- (United States) Tim Thomas – SF, Villanova
- (United States) Keith Van Horn – PF, Utah

== See also ==
- List of first overall NBA draft picks
