= 1997–98 Atlanta Hawks season =

NBA professional basketball team season

- Head coach: Lenny Wilkens
- Arena: Georgia Dome, Alexander Memorial Coliseum

Results
- Record: 50–32 (.610)
- Place: Division: 4th (Central); Conference: 5th (Eastern)
- Playoff finish: East First Round (lost to Hornets 1–3)
- Stats at Basketball Reference

Local media
- Television: WATL; Fox Sports South
- Radio: WCNN

The 1997–98 Atlanta Hawks season was the 49th season for the Atlanta Hawks in the National Basketball Association, and their 30th season in Atlanta, Georgia.

== Season summary ==
=== Off-season ===
The Hawks had the 22nd overall pick in the 1997 NBA draft, and selected shooting guard Ed Gray from the University of California. During the off-season, the team signed free agent Chucky Brown, and re-signed Greg Anderson, who previously played for the Hawks during the 1994–95 season.

Due to the demolition of the Omni Coliseum during the off-season, the Hawks played their home games between the Georgia Dome, home of the NFL's Atlanta Falcons, and the Alexander Memorial Coliseum, home of the NCAA's Georgia Tech Yellow Jackets basketball team. The Alexander Memorial Coliseum, which was known as the Alexander Memorial Coliseum at McDonald's Center at the time, was also the Hawks' original home from 1968 to 1972, after the team relocated to Atlanta from St. Louis, Missouri.

=== Regular season ===
The Hawks got off to a fast start by winning their first eleven games of the regular season. However, after a 19–5 start to the season, the team struggled posting a seven-game losing streak between December and January, but then posted a six-game winning streak afterwards, and later on held a 29–20 record at the All-Star break. In February, head coach Lenny Wilkens changed the team's starting lineup, replacing Christian Laettner at power forward with sixth man Alan Henderson for the remainder of the season. The Hawks won eight of their final eleven games of the season, and finished in fourth place in the Central Division with a solid 50–32 record, earning the fifth seed in the Eastern Conference; the team qualified for the NBA playoffs for the sixth consecutive year.

Steve Smith averaged 20.1 points and 4.0 assists per game, while Henderson averaged 14.3 points and 6.4 rebounds per game, and was named the NBA Most Improved Player of the Year, and Laettner provided the team with 13.8 points and 6.6 rebounds per game. In addition, Dikembe Mutombo provided with 13.4 points, 11.4 rebounds and 3.4 blocks per game, and was named the NBA Defensive Player of the Year for the second consecutive year; he was also named to the All-NBA Third Team, and to the NBA All-Defensive First Team. Meanwhile, Mookie Blaylock contributed 13.2 points, 6.7 assists and 2.6 steals per game, but struggled shooting .269 in three-point field-goal percentage, and was named to the NBA All-Defensive Second Team, and Tyrone Corbin averaged 10.2 points and 1.3 steals per game. Off the bench, Eldridge Recasner contributed 9.3 points per game, while Gray contributed 7.6 points per game, but only played just 30 games due to a sprained right foot injury, and was suspended indefinitely for missing medical appointments, and Brown averaged 5.0 points per game.

During the NBA All-Star weekend at Madison Square Garden in New York City, New York, Mutombo and Smith were both selected for the 1998 NBA All-Star Game, as members of the Eastern Conference All-Star team; it was Smith's first and only All-Star appearance. Blaylock finished tied in fifth place in Defensive Player of the Year voting. The Hawks finished 24th in the NBA in home-game attendance, with an attendance of 610,615 at the Georgia Dome, and the Alexander Memorial Coliseum during the regular season.

=== NBA playoffs ===
In the Eastern Conference First Round of the 1998 NBA playoffs, the Hawks faced off against the 4th–seeded Charlotte Hornets, who were led by All-Star forward Glen Rice, Anthony Mason and Vlade Divac; Rice was Smith's former teammate on the Miami Heat. The Hawks lost the first two games to the Hornets on the road at the Charlotte Coliseum, but managed to win Game 3 at home by a 32-point margin, 96–64 at the Georgia Dome. However, the Hawks lost Game 4 to the Hornets at home, 91–82, thus losing the series in four games.

=== Notable highlights ===
One notable highlight of the regular season occurred on March 27, 1998, in which the Hawks set a then single-game regular season attendance record of 62,046 at the Georgia Dome in a game against All-Star guard Michael Jordan, and the 2-time defending NBA champion Chicago Bulls. However, the Hawks lost to the Bulls by a score of 89–74. The Bulls would go on to defeat the Utah Jazz in six games in the 1998 NBA Finals for their third consecutive NBA championship, and sixth overall in eight years.

=== Aftermath ===
Following the season, Laettner was traded to the Detroit Pistons, while Recasner and Brown both signed as free agents with the Charlotte Hornets, and Anderson was released to free agency.

== Offseason ==
=== Draft picks ===
Round	Pick	Player	Position	Nationality	College
1	22	Ed Gray	SG	United States	California
2	49	Alain Digbeu	SG/SF	France	
2	50	Chris Crawford	PF/SF	United States	Marquette

== Roster ==
1997–98 Atlanta Hawks roster
Players

Pos.	No.	Player	Height	Weight	DOB	From
C	0	Greg Anderson	6 ft 10 in (2.08 m)	230 lb (104 kg)	1964–06–22	Houston
G	11	Drew Barry	6 ft 5 in (1.96 m)	191 lb (87 kg)	1973–02–17	Georgia Tech
G	10	Mookie Blaylock	6 ft 0 in (1.83 m)	180 lb (82 kg)	1967–03–20	Oklahoma
F	52	Chucky Brown	6 ft 7 in (2.01 m)	214 lb (97 kg)	1968–02–29	NC State
F	33	Tyrone Corbin	6 ft 6 in (1.98 m)	210 lb (95 kg)	1962–12–31	DePaul
F	4	Chris Crawford	6 ft 9 in (2.06 m)	235 lb (107 kg)	1975–05–13	Marquette
G	22	Ed Gray (injured) (S)	6 ft 3 in (1.91 m)	210 lb (95 kg)	1975–09–27	California
F	44	Alan Henderson	6 ft 9 in (2.06 m)	235 lb (107 kg)	1972–12–02	Indiana
F/C	32	Christian Laettner	6 ft 11 in (2.11 m)	235 lb (107 kg)	1969–08–17	Duke
F	2	Anthony Miller	6 ft 9 in (2.06 m)	235 lb (107 kg)	1971–10–22	Michigan State
C	55	Dikembe Mutombo	7 ft 2 in (2.18 m)	260 lb (118 kg)	1966–06–25	Georgetown
G	3	Eldridge Recasner	6 ft 3 in (1.91 m)	190 lb (86 kg)	1967–12–14	Washington
G	8	Steve Smith	6 ft 7 in (2.01 m)	200 lb (91 kg)	1969–03–31	Michigan State

Coaches
Head coach
- Lenny Wilkens
Assistant(s)
- Stan Albeck
- Dick Helm
- Phil Hubbard
- Gary Wortman

Legend
- (DP) Unsigned draft pick
- (FA) Free agent
- (S) Suspended
- Injured

Roster

=== Roster notes ===
- Rookie shooting guard Ed Gray was suspended indefinitely after playing 30 games for missing medical appointments; Gray was on the injured reserve list due to a sprained right foot.

== Regular season ==
=== Season standings ===
Central Division	W	L	PCT	GB	Home	Road	Div
y-Chicago Bulls	62	20	.756	–	37–4	25–16	21–7
x-Indiana Pacers	58	24	.707	4	32–9	26–15	19–9
x-Charlotte Hornets	51	31	.622	11	32–9	19–22	16–12
x-Atlanta Hawks	50	32	.610	12	29–12	21–20	19–9
x-Cleveland Cavaliers	47	35	.573	15	27–14	20–21	14–14
Detroit Pistons	37	45	.451	25	25–16	12–29	12–16
Milwaukee Bucks	36	46	.439	26	21–20	15–26	9–19
Toronto Raptors	16	66	.195	46	9–32	7–34	2–26

#	Eastern Conference				
#	Team	W	L	PCT	GB
1	c-Chicago Bulls	62	20	.756	–
2	y-Miami Heat	55	27	.671	7
3	x-Indiana Pacers	58	24	.707	4
4	x-Charlotte Hornets	51	31	.622	11
5	x-Atlanta Hawks	50	32	.610	12
6	x-Cleveland Cavaliers	47	35	.573	15
7	x-New York Knicks	43	39	.524	19
8	x-New Jersey Nets	43	39	.524	19
9	Washington Wizards	42	40	.512	20
10	Orlando Magic	41	41	.500	21
11	Detroit Pistons	37	45	.451	25
12	Boston Celtics	36	46	.439	26
13	Milwaukee Bucks	36	46	.439	26
14	Philadelphia 76ers	31	51	.378	31
15	Toronto Raptors	16	66	.195	46

z – clinched division title
y – clinched division title
x – clinched playoff spot

=== Game log ===
1997–98 game log
Total: 50–32 (home: 29–12; road: 21–20)
October: 1–0 (home: 0–0; road: 1–0)

Game	Date	Team	Score	Location Attendance	Record
1	October 31	@ Orlando Magic	W 105–99	Orlando Arena	1–0

November: 13–2 (home: 9–1; road: 4–1)

Game	Date	Team	Score	Location Attendance	Record
2	November 1	Toronto Raptors	W 90–85	Alexander Memorial Coliseum	2–0
3	November 4	Detroit Pistons	W 82–71	Georgia Dome	3–0
4	November 5	@ Philadelphia 76ers	W 93–88	CoreStates Center	4–0
5	November 7	Chicago Bulls	W 80–78	Georgia Dome	5–0
6	November 8	@ Cleveland Cavaliers	W 99–97 (OT)	Gund Arena	6–0
7	November 11	Seattle SuperSonics	W 89–87	Georgia Dome	7–0
8	November 12	@ Indiana Pacers	W 89–86	Market Square Arena	8–0
9	November 14	Sacramento Kings	W 104–103	Georgia Dome	9–0
10	November 16	Los Angeles Clippers	W 89–83	Alexander Memorial Coliseum	10–0
11	November 18	Washington Wizards	W 98–89 (OT)	Georgia Dome	11–0
12	November 20	New York Knicks	L 79–100	Georgia Dome	11–1
13	November 22	@ Detroit Pistons	L 85–87	The Palace of Auburn Hills	11–2
14	November 26	@ Toronto Raptors	W 109–104 (2OT)	SkyDome	12–2
15	November 29	Charlotte Hornets	W 98–80	Georgia Dome	13–2
16	November 30	San Antonio Spurs	W 108–96	Georgia Dome	14–2

December: 5–8 (home: 1–3; road: 4–5)

Game	Date	Team	Score	Location Attendance	Record
17	December 2	@ Dallas Mavericks	W 112–79	Reunion Arena	15–2
18	December 4	@ Houston Rockets	L 87–94	The Summit	15–3
19	December 9	Miami Heat	L 81–97	Alexander Memorial Coliseum	15–4
20	December 11	@ Phoenix Suns	L 78–94	America West Arena	15–5
21	December 12	@ Los Angeles Clippers	W 83–74	Los Angeles Memorial Sports Arena	16–5
22	December 14	@ Sacramento Kings	W 93–89	ARCO Arena	17–5
23	December 15	@ Portland Trail Blazers	W 99–90	Rose Garden	18–5
24	December 17	Cleveland Cavaliers	W 94–83	Georgia Dome	19–5
25	December 19	Los Angeles Lakers	L 96–98	Georgia Dome	19–6
26	December 20	@ Miami Heat	L 92–99	Miami Arena	19–7
27	December 22	Utah Jazz	L 99–101	Georgia Dome	19–8
28	December 26	@ Milwaukee Bucks	L 94–99 (OT)	Bradley Center	19–9
29	December 27	@ Chicago Bulls	L 90–97	United Center	19–10

January: 9–8 (home: 5–3; road: 4–5)

Game	Date	Team	Score	Location Attendance	Record
30	January 2	@ Los Angeles Lakers	L 106–116	Great Western Forum	19–11
31	January 3	@ Utah Jazz	L 82–97	Delta Center	19–12
32	January 7	@ Golden State Warriors	W 106–86	Oakland Arena	20–12
33	January 9	Washington Wizards	W 82–77	Alexander Memorial Coliseum	21–12
34	January 11	@ Washington Wizards	W 107–102 (OT)	MCI Center	22–12
35	January 13	@ New York Knicks	W 91–89	Madison Square Garden	23–12
36	January 14	Dallas Mavericks	W 108–82	Alexander Memorial Coliseum	24–12
37	January 16	Golden State Warriors	W 102–89	Alexander Memorial Coliseum	25–12
38	January 17	@ New Jersey Nets	L 81–97	Continental Airlines Arena	25–13
39	January 20	Milwaukee Bucks	W 103–89	Georgia Dome	26–13
40	January 21	@ San Antonio Spurs	L 76–90	Alamodome	26–14
41	January 23	Boston Celtics	L 85–89	Georgia Dome	26–15
42	January 24	Portland Trail Blazers	L 77–92	Georgia Dome	26–16
43	January 26	Phoenix Suns	L 91–96	Georgia Dome	26–17
44	January 27	@ Minnesota Timberwolves	L 96–113	Target Center	26–18
45	January 29	Philadelphia 76ers	W 109–99 (OT)	Alexander Memorial Coliseum	27–18
46	January 31	@ Charlotte Hornets	W 103–83	Charlotte Coliseum	28–18

February: 5–6 (home: 2–2; road: 3–4)

Game	Date	Team	Score	Location Attendance	Record
47	February 2	@ Miami Heat	L 83–90	Miami Arena	28–19
48	February 3	@ Orlando Magic	L 90–91	Orlando Arena	28–20
49	February 5	@ Cleveland Cavaliers	W 108–94	Gund Arena	29–20
50	February 10	@ Milwaukee Bucks	W 108–100	Bradley Center	30–20
51	February 13	@ Chicago Bulls	L 110–112	United Center	30–21
52	February 14	Indiana Pacers	L 92–96	Georgia Dome	30–22
53	February 16	Orlando Magic	L 81–85	Georgia Dome	30–23
54	February 18	New Jersey Nets	W 114–104	Alexander Memorial Coliseum	31–23
55	February 20	Vancouver Grizzlies	W 115–92	Alexander Memorial Coliseum	32–23
56	February 25	@ Denver Nuggets	W 112–88	McNichols Arena	33–23
57	February 27	@ Seattle SuperSonics	L 88–90	KeyArena at Seattle Center	33–24

March: 9–5 (home: 6–1; road: 3–4)

Game	Date	Team	Score	Location Attendance	Record
58	March 1	@ Vancouver Grizzlies	W 101–76	General Motors Place	34–24
59	March 6	Denver Nuggets	W 115–94	Alexander Memorial Coliseum	35–24
60	March 8	Cleveland Cavaliers	W 101–96	Alexander Memorial Coliseum	36–24
61	March 11	@ Boston Celtics	W 110–105	FleetCenter	37–24
62	March 13	@ Philadelphia 76ers	L 86–107	CoreStates Center	37–25
63	March 15	Boston Celtics	W 93–77	Alexander Memorial Coliseum	38–25
64	March 17	@ Toronto Raptors	W 117–105	SkyDome	39–25
65	March 19	Milwaukee Bucks	W 84–81	Alexander Memorial Coliseum	40–25
66	March 20	@ New York Knicks	L 108–109	Madison Square Garden	40–26
67	March 22	@ Detroit Pistons	L 98–105	The Palace of Auburn Hills	40–27
68	March 24	Orlando Magic	W 85–73	Georgia Dome	41–27
69	March 27	Chicago Bulls	L 74–89	Georgia Dome	41–28
70	March 29	Detroit Pistons	W 118–95	Georgia Dome	42–28
71	March 31	@ New Jersey Nets	W 90–105	Continental Airlines Arena	42–29

April: 8–3 (home: 6–2; road: 2–1)

Game	Date	Team	Score	Location Attendance	Record
72	April 1	Toronto Raptors	W 105–91	Georgia Dome	43–29
73	April 3	Houston Rockets	W 107–87	Georgia Dome	44–29
74	April 5	Minnesota Timberwolves	L 96–97	Georgia Dome	44–30
75	April 7	New York Knicks	W 92–79	Georgia Dome	45–30
76	April 9	Indiana Pacers	L 102–105 (OT)	Georgia Dome	45–31
77	April 10	@ Charlotte Hornets	W 99–87	Charlotte Coliseum	46–31
78	April 12	@ Washington Wizards	W 91–81	MCI Center	47–31
79	April 14	Philadelphia 76ers	W 95–94	Georgia Dome	48–31
80	April 15	@ Indiana Pacers	L 70–82	Market Square Arena	48–32
81	April 17	Charlotte Hornets	W 121–104	Georgia Dome	49–32
82	April 19	Miami Heat	W 101–89	Georgia Dome	50–32

1997–98 schedule

== Playoffs ==
1998 playoff game log
First round: 1–3 (home: 1–1; road: 0–2)

Game	Date	Team	Score	High points	High rebounds	High assists	Location Attendance	Series
1	April 23	@ Charlotte	L 87–97	Steve Smith (35)	Dikembe Mutombo (15)	Mookie Blaylock (9)	Charlotte Coliseum; 19,176	0–1
2	April 25	@ Charlotte	L 85–92	Henderson, Smith (22)	Henderson, Mutombo (9)	Mookie Blaylock (13)	Charlotte Coliseum; 20,390	0–2
3	April 28	Charlotte	W 96–64	Mookie Blaylock (16)	Dikembe Mutombo (11)	Mookie Blaylock (7)	Georgia Dome; 19,745	1–2
4	May 1	Charlotte	L 82–91	Steve Smith (27)	Dikembe Mutombo (16)	Mookie Blaylock (4)	Georgia Dome; 22,074	1–3

1998 schedule

== Player statistics ==
Legend
GP	Games played	GS	Games started	MPG	Minutes per game
FG%	Field-goal percentage	3P%	3-point field-goal percentage	FT%	Free-throw percentage
RPG	Rebounds per game	APG	Assists per game	SPG	Steals per game
BPG	Blocks per game	PPG	Points per game

=== Season ===
Player	GP	GS	MPG	FG%	3P%	FT%	RPG	APG	SPG	BPG	PPG
Greg Anderson	50	0	8.0	.444	.000	.390	2.4	.3	.4	.2	1.8
Drew Barry	27	0	9.5	.474	.429	.846	1.3	1.8	.4	.0	2.1
Mookie Blaylock	70	69	38.6	.392	.269	.709	4.9	6.7	2.6	.3	13.2
Chucky Brown	77	8	15.6	.433	.250	.724	2.4	.7	.3	.2	5.0
Tyrone Corbin	79	79	34.2	.439	.348	.789	4.6	2.2	1.3	.1	10.2
Chris Crawford	40	0	6.4	.418	.333	.838	1.0	.2	.3	.2	3.8
Ed Gray	30	3	15.7	.381	.391	.846	1.5	1.1	.5	.4	7.6
Alan Henderson	69	33	29.0	.485	.500	.652	6.4	1.1	.6	.5	14.3
Christian Laettner	74	49	30.8	.485	.222	.864	6.6	2.6	1.0	1.0	13.8
Randy Livingston	12	0	6.8	.250	.	.800	.5	.4	.6	.2	.8
Anthony Miller	37	0	6.2	.558	.	.538	1.9	.1	.4	.1	2.1
Dikembe Mutombo	82	82	35.6	.537	.	.670	11.4	1.0	.4	3.4	13.4
Brian Oliver	5	0	12.2	.368	.	.250	1.8	.4	.2	.0	3.0
Eldridge Recasner	59	14	24.6	.456	.419	.937	2.4	2.0	.7	.0	9.3
Steve Smith	73	73	39.1	.444	.351	.855	4.2	4.0	1.0	0.4	20.1
Donald Whiteside	3	0	5.3	.500	.	.	.3	.3	.0	.0	.7

=== Playoffs ===
Player	GP	GS	MPG	FG%	3P%	FT%	RPG	APG	SPG	BPG	PPG
Greg Anderson	1	0	4.0	.	.	.000	2.0	.	.	1.0	.
Drew Barry	2	0	2.5	.000	.000	.	.5	.	.	.	.
Mookie Blaylock	4	4	38.3	.415	.296	.583	5.0	8.3	2.3	.3	14.8
Chucky Brown	4	0	12.5	.467	.500	.500	1.5	1.0	.	.	4.0
Tyrone Corbin	4	4	28.3	.280	.167	.	3.8	1.0	1.5	.3	3.8
Chris Crawford	1	0	4.0	.	.	1.000	2.0	.	.	1.0	2.0
Alan Henderson	4	4	31.5	.526	.000	.611	5.5	1.0	.8	.3	12.8
Christian Laettner	4	0	21.8	.343	.000	.882	4.3	1.0	1.5	.3	9.8
Anthony Miller	4	0	8.3	.375	.	1.000	2.3	.3	.5	.3	2.0
Dikembe Mutombo	4	4	34.0	.458	.	.625	12.8	.3	.3	2.3	8.0
Eldridge Recasner	4	0	22.3	.400	.583	1.000	1.0	2.0	.5	.	7.3
Steve Smith	4	4	40.0	.574	.500	.688	2.8	2.3	.5	.8	24.8

Player statistics citation:

== Awards and records ==
- Dikembe Mutombo, NBA Defensive Player of the Year Award
- Alan Henderson, NBA Most Improved Player Award
- Dikembe Mutombo, All-NBA Third Team
- Dikembe Mutombo, NBA All-Defensive First Team
- Mookie Blaylock, NBA All-Defensive Second Team

== Transactions ==
=== Trades ===
September 29, 1997

- Traded Priest Lauderdale to the Denver Nuggets for Efthimios Rentzias and a 2000 second round draft pick.

=== Free agents ===
September 26, 1997

- Signed Anthony Miller as a free agent.
- Signed Donald Whiteside as a free agent.
- Signed Drew Barry as a free agent.

October 2, 1997

- Signed Chucky Brown as a free agent.
- Signed Chris King as a free agent.

October 8, 1997

- Waived Chris King.

October 10, 1997

- Signed Greg Anderson as a free agent.

October 19, 1997

- Waived Drew Barry

November 7, 1997

- Signed Randy Livingston as a free agent.
- Waived Donald Whiteside.

November 20, 1997

- Waived Randy Livingston.

December 9, 1997

- Signed Randy Livingston as a free agent.

January 10, 1998

- Waived Randy Livingston.

January 20, 1998

- Signed Drew Barry to a 10-day contract.

February 11, 1998

- Signed Drew Barry to a contract for the rest of the season.

February 13, 1998

- Signed Lloyd Daniels to a 10-day contract.

February 15, 1998

- Released Lloyd Daniels.

February 17, 1998

- Signed Brian Oliver to the first of two 10-day contracts.

Player transactions citation:

== See also ==
- 1997–98 NBA season
