= Chucky Brown =

American basketball player (born 1968)

Personal information
- Born: February 29, 1968 (age 58) New York City, New York, U.S.
- Listed height: 6 ft 8 in (2.03 m)
- Listed weight: 220 lb (100 kg)

Career information
- High school: North Brunswick (Leland, North Carolina)
- College: NC State (1985–1989)
- NBA draft: 1989: 2nd round, 43rd overall pick
- Drafted by: Cleveland Cavaliers
- Playing career: 1989–2002
- Position: Power forward / small forward
- Number: 52, 6

Career history

Playing
- 1989–1991: Cleveland Cavaliers
- 1991–1992: Los Angeles Lakers
- 1992: Pallacanestro Firenze
- 1992–1993: New Jersey Nets
- 1993: Dallas Mavericks
- 1993–1994: Grand Rapids Hoops
- 1994–1995: Yakima Sun Kings
- 1995–1996: Houston Rockets
- 1996: Phoenix Suns
- 1996–1997: Milwaukee Bucks
- 1997–1998: Atlanta Hawks
- 1999: Charlotte Hornets
- 1999–2000: San Antonio Spurs
- 2000: Charlotte Hornets
- 2001: Golden State Warriors
- 2001: Cleveland Cavaliers
- 2002: Sacramento Kings

Coaching
- 2004: North Raleigh Christian Academy
- 2004–2006: Roanoke Dazzle (assistant)
- 2006–2009: Los Angeles D-Fenders (assistant)
- 2009–2010: Los Angeles D-Fenders
- 2019–2022: West Johnston HS
- 2022–2024: St. Augustine's

Career highlights
- NBA champion (1995); All-CBA First Team (1995); First-team All-ACC (1989); North Carolina Mr. Basketball (1985)

Career NBA statistics
- Points: 4,125 (5.9 ppg)
- Rebounds: 2,148 (3.1 rpg)
- Assists: 549 (0.8 apg)
- Stats at NBA.com
- Stats at Basketball Reference

Clarence "Chucky" Brown Jr. (born February 29, 1968) is an American men's college basketball coach and former college and professional basketball player.

A 6'7" forward, Brown played college ball at North Carolina State, and played in the NCAA Tournament all four seasons. His freshman year (1986) he averaged ten minutes and three points per game as the Wolfpack reached the Elite Eight before losing to Kansas in Kansas City. In his sophomore season NC State won the ACC Tournament championship, with Brown averaging 18.5 minutes and 6.6 points per game. Brown was a starter in his junior and senior seasons, averaging 33 minutes and 16.5 points. In Brown's senior season, the 1989 Wolfpack finished first in the Atlantic Coast Conference regular season, and reached the Sweet Sixteen but lost to Georgetown in the regional semi-finals.

Brown was selected by the Cleveland Cavaliers in the second round of the 1989 NBA draft. Brown was on the active roster of 12 different teams, which was an NBA record shared with Joe Smith, Jim Jackson, Tony Massenburg, and Ish Smith; until Ish played with the Denver Nuggets, his 13th team, in the 2022–23 season. He retired with 4,125 career points.

In addition to the NBA teams, Brown had stints in the Continental Basketball Association and Italy's Panna Firenze. He played three games for Panna Firenze in 1992. The CBA saw Brown play for the Grand Rapids Hoops in 1993 and Yakima Sun Kings in 1994 and 1995. He was selected to the All-CBA First Team in 1995. He became the second player to earn both an NBA ring and CBA ring in the same season.

Brown served as head coach of the World Basketball Association's Raleigh Knights during the summer of 2004, then served two seasons as an assistant coach for the Roanoke Dazzle of the NBA Development League. In 2006, Brown was named an assistant coach for the NBDL's Los Angeles D-Fenders, and was then promoted to head coach for one season. Brown lives in Cary, North Carolina with his wife and three daughters.

On April 2, 2019, Brown was named head coach of the men's varsity basketball team at West Johnston High School in Benson, North Carolina. In April 2022, Brown was named head coach of the men's basketball team at St. Augustine's University in Raleigh, North Carolina. In October 2025, It was announced that Chucky would be the new radio color analyst for NC State men’s basketball on the Wolfpack Sports Network.

== NBA career ==
=== Cleveland Cavaliers (1989–1991) ===
Brown was picked by the Cleveland Cavaliers with the 43rd overall pick in the 1989 NBA draft after playing for North Carolina State University. He would start 86 of his 149 games played with the organization. During his stint, he averaged 6.9 points per game, 2.8 rebounds per game, and 0.8 assists per game. On December 2, 1991, the Cavaliers waived Brown.

=== Los Angeles Lakers (1991–1992) ===
On December 5, three days after he was waived by the Cavaliers, Brown signed with the Los Angeles Lakers. He played 36 games for Los Angeles. He averaged 3.8 points per game, 2.1 rebounds per game, and 0.6 assists per game. He would play for Pallacanestro Firenze in Italy before signing with the New Jersey Nets.

=== New Jersey Nets (1992–1993) ===
On October 7, 1992, Brown signed with the New Jersey Nets. With the Nets, he would average 5.1 points per game, 3.0 rebounds per game, and 0.7 assists per game.

=== Dallas Mavericks (1993) ===
On November 12, 1993, Brown signed with the Dallas Mavericks. His tenure with Dallas would be short, as he would play only one game for them before being waived on November 23. In his only game with the Mavs, he scored three points, grabbed one rebound, and committed two fouls.

=== CBA career (1993–1995) ===
Brown played in the Continental Basketball Association for three years. He played for the Grand Rapids Hoops until being traded to the Yakima Sun Kings along with Reggie Jordan during the 1993–94 season. On October 4, 1994, Brown signed with the Miami Heat, but the Heat waived him before the start of the season. Brown would then play for the Yakima Sun Kings during the 1993–94 and 1994–95 seasons. He averaged 21.3ppg and 5.5rpg in 31 games for the Sun Kings, and was a 1995 CBA All-Star, before getting called up to the Houston Rockets. Brown won a CBA title and an NBA title, with the Rockets, that year.

=== Houston Rockets (1995–1996) ===
On February 2, 1995, he would sign the first of two 10-day contracts with the Houston Rockets, and he would sign with them for the remainder of the season on February 25. Brown would play in his most productive seasons in Houston, winning a championship in the 1994–95 season. During his tenure with the Rockets, he averaged 7.8 points per game, 5.4 rebounds per game, and 1.1 assists per game. During the 1995–96 season, he started all 82 games for the Rockets.

=== Phoenix Suns (1996) ===
On August 19, 1996, Brown, along with teammates Mark Bryant, Sam Cassell, and Robert Horry, were traded to the Phoenix Suns for Charles Barkley and a 1999 2nd-round pick. Brown played a total of 10 games with the Suns, averaging 3.4 points per game, 1.6 rebounds per game, and 0.4 assists per game.

=== Milwaukee Bucks (1996–1997) ===
On December 4, 1996, Brown was traded to the Milwaukee Bucks for Darrin Hancock and a 1997 2nd-round draft pick. He played 60 games for Milwaukee, averaging 2.8 points per game, 2.2 rebounds per game, and 0.4 assists per game.

=== Atlanta Hawks (1997–1998) ===
On October 2, 1997, Brown signed with the Atlanta Hawks. He would average 5.0 points per game, 2.4 rebounds per game, and 0.7 assists per game in his 77 games with the team.

=== Charlotte Hornets (1999) ===
On January 21, 1999, Brown signed with the Charlotte Hornets. During his stint with Charlotte, he would average the most points per game since the 1995–96 season. He averaged 8.5 points per game, 3.6 rebounds per game, and 1.2 assists per game.

=== San Antonio Spurs (1999–2000) ===
On October 1, 1999, Brown signed with the San Antonio Spurs. He started 27 of his 30 games with San Antonio, and he averaged 6.3 points per game, 2.6 rebounds per game, and 1.4 assists per game. He would eventually be waived by the Spurs on February 4, 2000.

=== Return to Charlotte (2000–2001) ===
On February 8, 2000, Brown signed with the Charlotte Hornets again. He would play 33 games in his second tenure with Charlotte, averaging 4.4 points per game, 2.7 rebounds per game, and 0.8 assists per game.

=== Golden State Warriors (2001) ===
On January 13, 2001, Brown signed the first of two 10-day contracts with the Golden State Warriors. In his 6 games with the Warriors, he would average 4.0 points per game, 3.0 rebounds per game, and 0.8 points per game. He would be waived by the Warriors on January 26.

=== Return to Cleveland (2001) ===
On January 29, Brown would return to the Cleveland Cavaliers, signing the first of two 10-day contracts with the team. He would eventually sign with the Cavs for the remainder of the season. He would average 3.9 points per game, 1.8 rebounds per game, and 0.3 assists per game in 20 games with Cleveland.

=== Sacramento Kings (2002) ===
Brown's final NBA season was spent with the Sacramento Kings. He signed the first of two 10-day contracts with them on February 26, 2002. He would later sign with Sacramento for the remainder of the season. In his 18 games with the Kings, he averaged 1.2 points per game, 1.8 rebounds per game, and 0.3 assists per game.

== NBA career statistics ==
Legend
GP	Games played	GS	Games started	MPG	Minutes per game
FG%	Field goal percentage	3P%	3-point field goal percentage	FT%	Free throw percentage
RPG	Rebounds per game	APG	Assists per game	SPG	Steals per game
BPG	Blocks per game	PPG	Points per game	**Bold**	Career high
*	Led the league

=== Regular season ===
Year	Team	GP	GS	MPG	FG%	3P%	FT%	RPG	APG	SPG	BPG	PPG
1989–90	Cleveland	75	35	17.9	.470	.000	.762	3.1	0.7	0.4	0.3	7.3
1990–91	Cleveland	74	51	20.1	.524	.000	.701	2.9	1.1	0.4	0.3	8.5
1991–92	Cleveland	6	0	8.3	.500	.000	.625	1.0	0.5	0.5	0.0	2.5
1991–92	L.A. Lakers	36	2	10.6	.466	.000	.610	2.1	0.6	0.3	0.2	3.8
1992–93	New Jersey	77	20	15.4	.483	.000	.724	3.0	0.7	0.3	0.3	5.1
1993–94	Dallas	1	0	10.0	**1.000**	.000	**1.000**	1.0	0.0	0.0	0.0	3.0
1994–95	Houston	41	14	19.9	.603	.333	.613	4.6	0.7	0.3	0.3	6.1
1995–96	Houston	**82**	**82***	24.6	.541	.125	.693	**5.4**	1.1	**0.6**	**0.5**	**8.6**
1996–97	Phoenix	10	0	8.3	.500	.000	.727	1.6	0.4	0.0	0.2	3.4
1996–97	Milwaukee	60	1	11.2	.508	.167	.661	2.2	0.4	0.2	0.3	2.8
1997–98	Atlanta	77	8	15.6	.433	.250	.724	2.4	0.7	0.3	0.2	5.0
1998–99	Charlotte	48	21	**24.8**	.472	**.375**	.678	3.6	**1.2**	0.3	0.4	8.5
1999–00	San Antonio	30	27	20.1	.466	.333	.806	2.6	1.4	0.3	0.3	6.3
1999–00	Charlotte	33	2	15.0	.434	.143	.524	2.7	0.8	0.4	0.2	4.4
2000–01	Golden State	6	0	12.3	.450	.000	.600	3.0	0.8	0.5	0.2	4.0
2000–01	Cleveland	20	2	13.3	.413	.000	.667	1.8	0.3	0.3	0.3	3.9
2001–02	Sacramento	18	0	5.1	.370	.000	.500	1.8	0.3	0.1	0.2	1.2
Career		694	265	17.2	.491	.227	.699	3.1	0.8	0.3	0.3	5.9

=== Playoffs ===
Year	Team	GP	GS	MPG	FG%	3P%	FT%	RPG	APG	SPG	BPG	PPG
1992	Los Angeles	3	0	14.7	.421	.000	.500	**3.7**	0.7	0.0	0.7	6.3
1993	New Jersey	4	0	15.5	.409	.000	**.857**	2.3	0.3	**0.8**	**0.8**	6.0
1995	Houston	**21**	1	15.5	.447	.500	.676	3.1	0.3	0.4	0.1	4.5
1996	Houston	8	**8**	**21.0**	**.556**	.000	.833	3.0	0.6	0.4	0.0	**8.1**
1998	Atlanta	4	0	12.5	.467	**.500**	.500	1.5	**1.0**	0.0	0.0	4.0
2002	Sacramento	1	0	1.0	.000	.000	.000	1.0	0.0	0.0	0.0	0.0
Career		41	9	15.9	.469	.400	.714	2.8	0.5	0.4	0.2	5.3

== Transactions ==
- June 27, 1989 – Drafted with the second round, 43rd overall pick by the Cleveland Cavaliers.
- December 2, 1991 – Waived by the Cavaliers.
- December 5, 1991 – Signed by the Los Angeles Lakers.
- September 29, 1992 – Rights renounced by the Lakers.
- October 7, 1992 – Signed by the New Jersey Nets.
- November 12, 1993 – Signed as a free agent by the Dallas Mavericks.
- November 23, 1993 – Waived by the Mavericks.
- October 4, 1994 – Signed by the Miami Heat.
- November 1, 1994 – Waived by the Heat (did not play in the NBA for them).
- February 1, 1995 – Signed by the Houston Rockets to a 10-day contract (re-signed on February 12 and 24 for the rest of the season).
- October 3, 1995 – Re-signed by the Rockets.
- August 19, 1996 – Traded by the Rockets with Robert Horry, Sam Cassell and Mark Bryant to the Phoenix Suns for Charles Barkley and a 1999 second round draft pick.
- December 4, 1996 – Traded by the Suns to the Milwaukee Bucks for Darrin Hancock and a conditional second round draft pick.
- October 2, 1997 – Signed as a free agent by the Atlanta Hawks.
- January 21, 1999 – Signed as a free agent by the Charlotte Hornets.
- October 1, 1999 – Signed as a free agent by the San Antonio Spurs.
- February 4, 2000 – Waived by the Spurs.
- February 8, 2000 – Signed by the Hornets to a 10-day contract.
- January 13, 2001 – Signed by the Golden State Warriors to a 10-day contract (re-signed on January 23, waived on January 26).
- January 29, 2001 – Signed by the Cleveland Cavaliers to a 10-day contract (re-signed on February 12 and 22 for the rest of the season).
- February 26, 2002 – Signed by the Sacramento Kings to a 10-day contract (re-signed on March 8 and 18 for the rest of the season).
