= Steve Smith (basketball) =

American basketball player (born 1969)

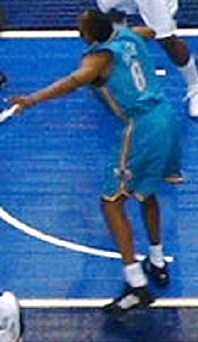
- Smith with the New Orleans Hornets in 2003

Personal information
- Born: March 31, 1969 (age 57) Highland Park, Michigan, U.S.
- Listed height: 6 ft 8 in (2.03 m)
- Listed weight: 221 lb (100 kg)

Career information
- High school: John J. Pershing (Detroit, Michigan)
- College: Michigan State (1987–1991)
- NBA draft: 1991: 1st round, 5th overall pick
- Drafted by: Miami Heat
- Playing career: 1991–2005
- Position: Shooting guard
- Number: 3, 8

Career history
- 1991–1994: Miami Heat
- 1994–1999: Atlanta Hawks
- 1999–2001: Portland Trail Blazers
- 2001–2003: San Antonio Spurs
- 2003–2004: New Orleans Hornets
- 2004–2005: Charlotte Bobcats
- 2005: Miami Heat

Career highlights
- NBA champion (2003); NBA All-Star (1998); NBA All-Rookie First Team (1992); Consensus second-team All-American (1991); Third-team All-American – AP, UPI (1990); 2× First-team All-Big Ten (1990, 1991); No. 21 retired by Michigan State Spartans

Career NBA statistics
- Points: 13,430 (14.3 ppg)
- Rebounds: 3,060 (3.2 rpg)
- Assists: 2,922 (3.1 apg)
- Stats at NBA.com
- Stats at Basketball Reference
Medals
Men's basketball
Representing the United States
Olympic Games
Gold medal – first place	2000 Sydney	Team competition
World Cup
Gold medal – first place	1994 Toronto	Team competition
Americas Championship
Gold medal – first place	1999 San Juan	Team competition
Universiade
Gold medal – first place	1989 Duisburg	Team competition

Steven Delano Smith (born March 31, 1969) is an American former professional basketball player who is a basketball analyst for Turner Sports. After a collegiate career with Michigan State, he played with several teams in his 14-season National Basketball Association career, including the Miami Heat, the Portland Trail Blazers and the San Antonio Spurs, but is perhaps best known for his five-year stint with the Atlanta Hawks which included an All-Star Game appearance in 1998. He won a championship with the Spurs in 2003. Smith was widely regarded as an excellent three-point shooter, and is one of three players to make seven 3-pointers in a quarter.

He joined the USA men's national basketball team in the 1994 FIBA World Championship winning the gold medal. He won another gold medal at the 1999 Tournament of the Americas and an Olympic gold medal with the USA men's national basketball team at the 2000 Summer Olympics with eleven other NBA All-Stars.

== College career ==
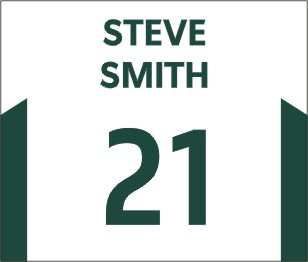
Smith's #21 was retired by Michigan State University in 1999

Smith finished his four-year career as the all-time leading scorer in Michigan State history, with 2,263 points. He ranks fourth on the school's all-time assists list (with 453) and fifth in rebounds (with 704). For his college career Smith averaged 18.5 points, 6.1 rebounds and 3.7 assists per contest in 122 games. He was named to the NABC All-American First Team as a senior. Smith led the Spartans to a Big Ten Championship and Sweet Sixteen appearance in 1990 and hit a game-winning, last-second three-pointer to beat Wisconsin–Green Bay in the first round of the 1991 NCAA Tournament. He was inducted into Michigan State University Athletics Hall of Fame in 2001.

== NBA career ==
=== Miami Heat ===
Smith was selected fifth overall in the 1991 NBA draft by the Miami Heat, a young expansion team which featured other young players such as Glen Rice, Rony Seikaly, and Brian Shaw. Smith played in 61 games in his rookie season, starting in 59 with averages of 12 points per game and 4.6 assists. The young team made the playoffs to face the top-seeded defending champion Chicago Bulls, who swept the Heat in 3 games in the first round. Smith averaged 16 points a game for the series. Injuries limited Smith to 48 games in the 1992–93 season, but he increased his scoring average to 16 points a game. Miami did not make the playoffs that year.

The 1993–94 season would prove to be Smith's best in Miami, as he averaged 17.3 points a game with 5.1 assists as the Heat won 42 games and entered the first round of the playoffs against the Atlanta Hawks. The series went to 5 games, as Miami won its first playoff games in franchise history. Smith led the team in scoring during the series with 19.2 points and shot 40 percent from beyond the three-point line. Smith would play just two games to start the 1994–95 season before being traded in a fire sale along with Grant Long to Atlanta for Kevin Willis, a deal that was universally regarded as a one-sided heist by Atlanta.

=== Atlanta Hawks ===
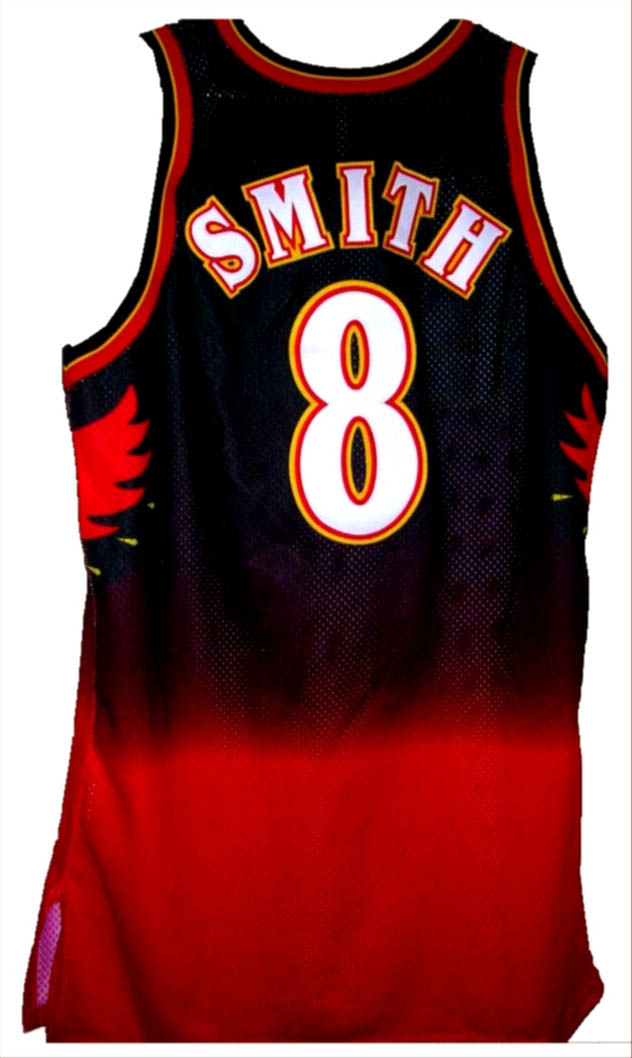
Smith enjoyed some of the most productive seasons of his career while wearing an Atlanta Hawks uniform (in the picture, the away jersey worn in the 1997–98 season)

Smith started in 59 of 78 games for Atlanta and averaged 16 points during the regular season and 19 points in the playoffs, as the Hawks lost in a first-round sweep to the Indiana Pacers. He would go on to average a then career-high 18.1 points a game in 80 starts in the 1995–96 season, forming a formidable backcourt one-two punch with Mookie Blaylock. The team under head coach Lenny Wilkens would win 46 games and defeat the Indiana Pacers in the first round in 5 games. The next round, while facing the Orlando Magic, Smith led all scorers in a Game 4 win with 35 points, before Atlanta lost the series 4 games to 1. Smith averaged 21.7 points in 10 playoff games that postseason.

The following season would feature another career high scoring average (20.1) for Smith, as he continued to serve as the Hawks' main option on offense. On March 14, 1997, Smith made a career high 9 three-pointers en route to a 36-point total, during a loss to the Seattle SuperSonics. On April 9, Smith recorded a career high 5 steals in a win over the Philadelphia 76ers. Atlanta also featured players such as solid power-forward Christian Laettner and defensive star Dikembe Mutombo, and would go on to win 56 games before meeting and defeating the Detroit Pistons in a 5-game first round series. Smith played well against Detroit and held his own against Michael Jordan and the defending champion Chicago Bulls, who defeated the Hawks in 5 games in the semifinals. The following season would be similar to Smith as he once again averaged 20.1 points a game, but this time managed to be named an NBA All-Star as he scored 14 points in 16 minutes of action in the 1998 NBA All-Star Game. The Hawks would disappoint in the playoffs yet again, however, this time losing to the Charlotte Hornets 3 games to 1 in the conference semifinals despite a 24.8 ppg scoring average by Smith for the series.

The 1998–99 season would be limited to 50 games as a result of a league-wide lockout, and in 36 games, Smith averaged 18.7 points a game and led the Hawks to another 5-game first-round victory over Detroit. The Hawks had no answer, however, for the New York Knicks, and again the Hawks were eliminated in the semifinals. Smith averaged 17.3 points a game in the 1999 playoffs. In the offseason, the Hawks traded Smith in a 4 player trade to the Portland Trail Blazers alongside Ed Gray in exchange for Jim Jackson and Isaiah Rider.

=== Portland Trail Blazers ===
Portland was a loaded team that had reached the Western Conference Finals in the 2000 playoffs and featured star forward Rasheed Wallace as well as the newly acquired Scottie Pippen. Smith would no longer be required to carry the offensive load, and averaged 14.9 points a game in 81 starts as the Trail Blazers secured the second best record in the Western Conference. Smith would increase his scoring average to 17.1 in the playoffs, as Portland would defeat the Minnesota Timberwolves in the first round before beating the Utah Jazz in the semifinals. Up next would be the league best Los Angeles Lakers, who took a 3–1 series lead over Portland before the Trail Blazers won game 5 on the road and game 6 at home as Smith scored 26 points to set up a game 7 matchup. Despite leading by double digits heading into the fourth quarter, the Lakers came back to win the game and advance to the NBA Finals, where they would win the NBA Title.

That summer, Smith represented the United States at the 2000 Summer Olympics for the United States men's national basketball team, which won the gold medal. He averaged just over 6 points a game in the Olympics, including a 12-point performance against China in the group stage of the tournament.

The Trail Blazers entered the 2000–01 season with high expectations, but struggled to repeat the success of the previous season, as injuries took their toll and new additions and trades hurt team chemistry. Smith only started in 36 of 81 games, but still managed to score 13.6 points a game. Portland would suffer another loss to the Lakers in the playoffs, this time in a three-game sweep in the first round. Following the season, he would be traded to the San Antonio Spurs for Derek Anderson and Steve Kerr.

=== San Antonio Spurs ===
The Spurs featured superstars Tim Duncan and David Robinson, and were attempting to win another championship as they had in 1999. Smith would be utilized as the team's starting shooting guard, averaging 11.6 points a game in 76 starts while leading in the league in three-point shooting at 47 percent for the season. Smith would average double-figure scoring in the Spurs' first-round win over the Seattle SuperSonics, including 17 points in a game 1 victory, but struggled against the defending champion L.A. Lakers, who defeated the Spurs in 5 games.

The following 2002–03 season would mark Smith's final year in San Antonio, while second-year point guard Tony Parker blossomed into the team's second leading scorer. The same was the case for guard Stephen Jackson, who consequently came to serve as the team's main starting shooting guard, with Smith starting in just 18 games for the season as a result of injuries limiting him to just 58 total games. As a result, Smith averaged 6.8 points a game, and would be used sparingly in the Spurs' playoff run, in which the team eliminated the Phoenix Suns, the three-time champion Lakers, and the Dallas Mavericks before defeating the New Jersey Nets in six games to win the NBA title, Smith's first and only championship. Just before the 2003–2004 season started, the free agent Smith signed with the New Orleans Hornets.

=== New Orleans Hornets ===
Smith played in 71 games for the Hornets, who were led by Baron Davis and Jamaal Magloire. He averaged 5 points a game and shot 40 percent from beyond the three-point arc. The Hornets made the playoffs but lost in a grueling back-and-forth series against Miami. Despite losing the final 7th game in Miami, Smith scored 25 points, including 5 three-pointers, against his former team. Once again a free agent before the following season, Smith signed with the Charlotte Bobcats.

=== Charlotte Bobcats and return to Miami ===
Smith played in 37 games for the young Bobcats team and averaged 7.9 points a game, including hitting the franchise's first three-point field goal. At midseason, he was traded to Miami for Malik Allen. He would be used sparingly by the Heat, including in their playoff run, which concluded with a loss in the conference finals to the defending champion Detroit Pistons. Following the season Smith announced his retirement.

== NBA career statistics ==
Legend
GP	Games played	GS	Games started	MPG	Minutes per game
FG%	Field goal percentage	3P%	3-point field goal percentage	FT%	Free throw percentage
RPG	Rebounds per game	APG	Assists per game	SPG	Steals per game
BPG	Blocks per game	PPG	Points per game	**Bold**	Career high
†	Won an NBA championship	*	Led the league

=== Regular season ===
Year	Team	GP	GS	MPG	FG%	3P%	FT%	RPG	APG	SPG	BPG	PPG
1991–92	Miami	61	59	29.6	.454	.320	.748	3.1	4.6	1.0	.3	12.0
1992–93	Miami	48	43	33.5	.451	.402	.787	4.1	**5.6**	1.0	.3	16.0
1993–94	Miami	78	77	35.6	.456	.347	.835	**4.5**	5.1	**1.1**	.4	17.3
1994–95	Miami	2	2	31.0	.379	.167	.773	3.0	3.5	1.0	**.5**	**20.5**
1994–95	Atlanta	78	59	33.4	.427	.334	.845	3.5	3.4	.8	.4	16.2
1995–96	Atlanta	80	80	35.7	.432	.331	.826	4.1	2.8	.8	.2	18.1
1996–97	Atlanta	72	72	**39.1**	.429	.335	.847	3.3	4.2	.9	.3	20.1
1997–98	Atlanta	73	73	**39.1**	.444	.351	.855	4.2	4.0	1.0	.4	20.1
1998–99	Atlanta	36	36	36.5	.402	.338	.849	4.2	3.3	1.0	.3	18.7
1999–00	Portland	**82**	**81**	32.8	**.467**	.398	.850	3.8	2.5	.9	.4	14.9
2000–01	Portland	81	36	31.4	.456	.339	.890	3.4	2.6	.6	.3	13.6
2001–02	San Antonio	77	76	28.7	.455	**.472***	.878	2.5	2.0	.7	.2	11.6
2002–03†	San Antonio	53	18	19.5	.388	.331	.833	1.9	1.3	.5	.2	6.8
2003–04	New Orleans	71	4	13.1	.406	.402	**.928**	1.1	.8	.2	.1	5.0
2004–05	Charlotte	37	1	17.2	.427	.422	.870	1.3	1.5	.3	.2	7.9
2004–05	Miami	13	0	8.8	.300	.200	.667	1.2	1.1	.2	.0	1.8
Career		942	717	30.6	.440	.358	.845	3.2	3.1	.8	.2	14.3
All-Star		1	0	16.0	.500	.400	.000	3.0	.0	.0	.0	14.0

=== Playoffs ===
Year	Team	GP	GS	MPG	FG%	3P%	FT%	RPG	APG	SPG	BPG	PPG
1992	Miami	3	3	33.3	.529	**.636**	.833	2.0	**5.0**	1.3	.3	16.0
1994	Miami	5	5	38.4	.413	.409	.840	**6.0**	2.2	.8	.4	19.2
1995	Atlanta	3	3	36.0	.395	.389	.842	2.7	2.0	**2.0**	.3	19.0
1996	Atlanta	10	10	**42.1**	.439	.410	.808	4.1	3.2	1.3	**1.3**	21.7
1997	Atlanta	10	10	**42.1**	.396	.327	.824	3.9	1.7	.4	.1	18.9
1998	Atlanta	4	4	40.0	**.574**	.500	.688	2.8	2.3	.5	.8	**24.8**
1999	Atlanta	9	9	39.6	.353	.273	.907	3.4	3.3	1.6	.2	17.3
2000	Portland	**16**	**16**	37.8	.486	.547	.885	2.5	2.8	1.2	.3	17.1
2001	Portland	3	3	40.7	.471	.364	.938	4.3	2.3	.7	.3	17.0
2002	San Antonio	10	10	29.8	.368	.263	.967	3.4	1.7	.8	.1	10.3
2003†	San Antonio	9	0	7.3	.208	.167	**1.000**	.8	.7	.1	.0	1.8
2004	New Orleans	5	0	9.2	.462	.545	.667	1.6	.2	.0	.0	6.4
2005	Miami	3	0	2.7	.000	-	-	.0	.0	.0	.0	.0
Career		90	73	32.2	.426	.394	.858	3.0	2.2	.9	.3	14.9

== Post-NBA career ==
Smith worked as an announcer on Atlanta Hawks games with Bob Rathbun and on the Big Ten Network as a college basketball analyst. For the 2008 season, Smith took a position at NBA TV, and was replaced for Hawks broadcasts by Dominique Wilkins. During the 2011 NBA All-Star Weekend, he was a member of the Atlanta team that won the Shooting Stars Competition.

== Charitable work ==
Smith is well known for his charitable pursuits, including a US$2.5 million gift in 1997 to his alma mater, Michigan State University, where he was a star guard under coach Jud Heathcote. Smith's donation helped to fund the Clara Bell Smith Student Athlete Academic Center, which is named for his mother. This was the largest single donation by a professional athlete to his former school in history. Smith also has a close philanthropic relationship with Children’s Healthcare of Atlanta where he has hosted fundraising events for the pediatric hospital.

== Personal life ==
Smith first met his wife, Millie, at a charity tennis tournament in Detroit. They had a long-distance relationship for more than a year before getting married in 1996. The couple have two sons, Brayden and Davis, and Smith often coaches them in soccer and basketball. He is the older cousin of NBA point guard Kay Felder.

Smith resides in Atlanta.
