= Alan Henderson =

American basketball player (born 1972)

Personal information
- Born: December 2, 1972 (age 53) Morgantown, West Virginia, U.S.
- Listed height: 6 ft 9 in (2.06 m)
- Listed weight: 240 lb (109 kg)

Career information
- High school: Brebeuf Jesuit (Indianapolis, Indiana)
- College: Indiana (1991–1995)
- NBA draft: 1995: 1st round, 16th overall pick
- Drafted by: Atlanta Hawks
- Playing career: 1995–2007
- Position: Forward / center
- Number: 44, 50

Career history
- 1995–2004: Atlanta Hawks
- 2004–2005: Dallas Mavericks
- 2005–2006: Cleveland Cavaliers
- 2006–2007: Philadelphia 76ers

Career highlights
- NBA Most Improved Player (1998); Third-team All-American – NABC (1995); McDonald's All-American (1991); 2× First-team Parade All-American (1990, 1991)

Career NBA statistics
- Points: 5,094 (7.8 ppg)
- Rebounds: 3,249 (5.0 rpg)
- Assists: 397 (0.6 apg)
- Stats at NBA.com
- Stats at Basketball Reference
Medals
Men's basketball
Representing United States
Goodwill Games
Bronze medal – third place	1994 St. Petersburg	National team

Alan Lybrooks Henderson (born December 2, 1972) is an American former professional basketball player of the National Basketball Association (NBA). He stands 6 ft 9 in (2.06 m) tall. Born in Morgantown, West Virginia, Henderson attended Brebeuf Jesuit Preparatory School in Indianapolis, Indiana. They lost the state championship game his senior year to Glenn Robinson's Gary Roosevelt squad. In 1994, he was a part of the US men's basketball team for the Goodwill Games.

He now runs Birdie Brown, a premium liquor brand, and owns franchises.

== College career ==
While at Indiana University, Henderson led the team in rebounding all four years. Currently, he is the only Indiana University player to rank in the school's top five in rebounding, blocked shots and steals. He is ninth in scoring and appeared in the Final Four in 1992. His 23.5 points per game scoring average for the 1995 season is the highest single season scoring average for any Indiana player during Bob Knight's 29-year tenure. Henderson was accepted into medical school at Indiana University and Howard University School of Medicine in 1995. He is also a member of Kappa Alpha Psi fraternity, and graduated from college with a degree in biology.

== NBA career ==
In 1995, Henderson was selected with the 16th pick in the NBA draft by the Atlanta Hawks, and has since played for the Hawks, the Dallas Mavericks, Cleveland Cavaliers, and the Philadelphia 76ers.

In his rookie year (1995–96) with the Hawks, he ranked 2nd on the team in total blocked shots (43). During the 1997–98 season, he was the recipient of the NBA Most Improved Player Award after averaging 14.3 points and 6.4 rebounds. Following his breakout season, Henderson signed a seven-year, $45 million contract to remain in Atlanta. He remained a member of an Atlanta team that for nine of his tenured seasons did not improve significantly nor get very far in the postseason when they qualified for the Playoffs.

On August 4, 2004, along with Jason Terry, Henderson was traded to the Dallas Mavericks for Antoine Walker and Tony Delk. He was then traded to the Milwaukee Bucks along with Calvin Booth for Keith Van Horn on February 24, 2005. The Bucks then waived Henderson the following day. On March 1, he re-signed with the Mavericks.

On September 17, 2005, Henderson signed a minimum contract with the Cleveland Cavaliers, appearing in 51 games as a reserve power forward.

On September 8, 2006, Henderson signed a minimum free agent contract with the Philadelphia 76ers.

On February 22, 2007, Henderson was traded to the Utah Jazz along with cash for the rights to swap draft picks in the second round of the 2007 NBA draft, but was released from the team on March 2. In early April, he was re-signed by the 76ers to a contract for the remainder of the season. He averaged 7.8 points, 5 rebounds and 0.6 assists in 652 NBA games.

He has four children with his wife Maxine, and lives in Indiana.

== NBA career statistics ==
Legend
GP	Games played	GS	Games started	MPG	Minutes per game
FG%	Field goal percentage	3P%	3-point field goal percentage	FT%	Free throw percentage
RPG	Rebounds per game	APG	Assists per game	SPG	Steals per game
BPG	Blocks per game	PPG	Points per game	**Bold**	Career high
*	Led the league

=== Regular season ===
Year	Team	GP	GS	MPG	FG%	3P%	FT%	RPG	APG	SPG	BPG	PPG
1995–96	Atlanta	79	4	17.9	.442	.000	.595	4.5	.6	.6	.5	6.4
1996–97	Atlanta	30	0	16.6	.475	–	.600	3.9	.8	.7	.2	6.6
1997–98	Atlanta	69	33	29.0	.485	.500	.652	6.4	**1.1**	.6	.5	**14.3**
1998–99	Atlanta	38	37	30.1	.442	.000	.671	6.6	.7	.9	.5	12.5
1999–00	Atlanta	**82**	**82***	**33.8**	.461	.100	.671	**7.0**	.9	**1.0**	**.7**	13.2
2000–01	Atlanta	73	42	24.8	.444	.000	.638	5.6	.7	.7	.4	10.5
2001–02	Atlanta	26	1	16.3	.509	**1.000**	.533	3.7	.4	.4	.6	5.5
2002–03	Atlanta	**82**	3	18.2	.468	.000	.638	4.9	.5	.4	.4	4.8
2003–04	Atlanta	6	0	11.3	.476	–	.667	3.5	.3	.2	.3	4.0
2004–05	Dallas	78	10	15.4	.527	.000	.539	4.5	.3	.4	.5	3.5
2005–06	Cleveland	51	3	10.4	.516	–	.673	2.7	.2	.2	.2	2.5
2006–07	Philadelphia	38	5	11.0	**.642**	–	**.702**	2.8	.3	.2	.3	3.1
Career		652	220	21.1	.469	.192	.639	5.0	.6	.6	.5	7.8

=== Playoffs ===
Year	Team	GP	GS	MPG	FG%	3P%	FT%	RPG	APG	SPG	BPG	PPG
1996	Atlanta	**10**	0	14.5	**.575**	–	.700	2.7	.7	.1	**.4**	5.3
1997	Atlanta	**10**	0	13.6	.559	–	.769	3.3	.0	.1	.3	5.8
1998	Atlanta	4	**4**	**31.5**	.526	.000	.611	**5.5**	**1.0**	**.8**	.3	**12.8**
1999	Atlanta	1	0	4.0	–	–	–	.0	.0	.0	.0	.0
2005	Dallas	9	0	10.2	.571	–	**1.000**	1.9	.0	.2	.2	2.0
2006	Cleveland	2	0	4.4	.000	–	–	1.0	.0	.0	.0	.0
Career		36	4	14.2	.547	.000	.714	2.8	.3	.2	.3	5.0
