= Mookie Blaylock =

American basketball player (born 1967)

Personal information
- Born: March 20, 1967 (age 59) Garland, Texas, U.S.
- Listed height: 6 ft 0 in (1.83 m)
- Listed weight: 180 lb (82 kg)

Career information
- High school: Garland (Garland, Texas)
- College: Midland (1985–1987); Oklahoma (1987–1989)
- NBA draft: 1989: 1st round, 12th overall pick
- Drafted by: New Jersey Nets
- Playing career: 1989–2002
- Position: Point guard
- Number: 10

Career history
- 1989–1992: New Jersey Nets
- 1992–1999: Atlanta Hawks
- 1999–2002: Golden State Warriors

Career highlights
- NBA All-Star (1994); 2× NBA All-Defensive First Team (1994, 1995); 4× NBA All-Defensive Second Team (1996–1999); 2× NBA steals leader (1997, 1998); Consensus second-team All-American (1989); First-team All-Big Eight (1989); Second-team All-Big Eight (1988); 2× First-team All-WJCAC (1986, 1987); No. 10 honored by Oklahoma Sooners

Career NBA statistics
- Points: 11,962 (13.5 ppg)
- Assists: 5,972 (6.7 apg)
- Steals: 2,075 (2.3 spg)
- Stats at NBA.com
- Stats at Basketball Reference

Daron Oshay "Mookie" Blaylock (born March 20, 1967) is an American former professional basketball player. He spent 13 years in the National Basketball Association (NBA) with the New Jersey Nets, Atlanta Hawks, and the Golden State Warriors.

== College career ==
A 6 ft 0 in (1.83 m) push-and-pass point guard, Blaylock was known for his defensive play and quick hands. He attended Garland High School, Midland College, where he earned NJCAA All-American honors in 1987, and the University of Oklahoma. His defensive play resulted in more than 200 steals in a season five times and earned him two NBA All-Defensive first-team selections. He was also an outside shooter and passer who regularly ranked among the league leaders in assists, and he was used to initiate the fast break. In 1988, he helped lead the Sooners to the NCAA title game.

== Professional career ==
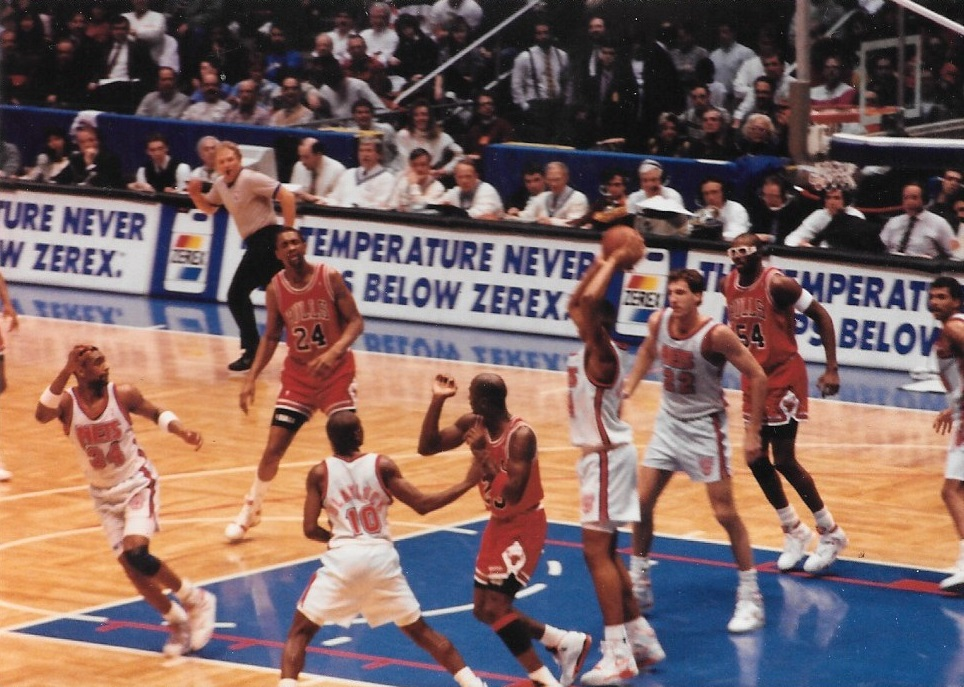
"Mookie" (#10) playing for the New Jersey Nets, being guarded by Michael Jordan on the court with players Horace Grant, Bill Cartwright, Chris Dudley, Chris Morris and others

Blaylock was selected by the New Jersey Nets with the 12th overall pick of the 1989 NBA draft and settled quickly into Nets' rotation. He was traded with Roy Hinson to the Atlanta Hawks prior to the 1992–93 season for Rumeal Robinson, where he flourished under newly signed coach Lenny Wilkens. He spent seven years with the Hawks, leading them in career three-point field goals (made and attempted) and career steals. He was also selected for the 1994 NBA All-Star Game. He was traded to the Golden State Warriors in a deal that brought Bimbo Coles, Duane Ferrell, and the 1999 10th overall draft pick, Jason Terry, to Atlanta, and finished off his career playing as a reserve for the Warriors.

=== NBA achievements ===
- Led the NBA in steals two consecutive seasons (1996–97 and 1997–98), joining Alvin Robertson, Magic Johnson, Allen Iverson, and Chris Paul as the only players to achieve that feat.
- Led the NBA in three-point attempts and finished second in three-pointers made in the 1996–97 season.
- Is the Atlanta Hawks' all-time franchise leader in steals (1,321).
- Set the Atlanta Hawks' single-season franchise records for three-pointers made (231) and attempted (623) in 1995–96.

== NBA career statistics ==
Legend
GP	Games played	GS	Games started	MPG	Minutes per game
FG%	Field goal percentage	3P%	3-point field goal percentage	FT%	Free throw percentage
RPG	Rebounds per game	APG	Assists per game	SPG	Steals per game
BPG	Blocks per game	PPG	Points per game	**Bold**	Career high
*	Led the league

=== Regular season ===
Year	Team	GP	GS	MPG	FG%	3P%	FT%	RPG	APG	SPG	BPG	PPG
1989–90	New Jersey	50	17	25.3	.371	.225	.778	2.8	4.2	1.6	0.3	10.1
1990–91	New Jersey	72	70	35.9	.416	.154	**.790**	3.5	6.1	2.3	**0.6**	14.1
1991–92	New Jersey	72	67	35.4	**.432**	.222	.712	3.7	6.8	2.4	**0.6**	13.8
1992–93	Atlanta	80	78	35.3	.429	**.375**	.728	3.5	8.4	2.5	0.3	13.4
1993–94	Atlanta	**81**	**81**	36.0	.411	.334	.730	5.2	**9.7**	2.6	0.5	13.8
1994–95	Atlanta	80	80	38.4	.425	.359	.729	4.9	7.7	2.5	0.3	17.2
1995–96	Atlanta	**81**	**81**	35.7	.405	.371	.747	4.1	5.9	2.6	0.2	15.7
1996–97	Atlanta	78	78	**39.2**	**.432**	.366	.753	**5.3**	5.9	**2.7***	0.3	**17.4**
1997–98	Atlanta	70	69	38.6	.392	.269	.709	4.9	6.7	2.6*	0.3	13.2
1998–99	Atlanta	48	48	36.7	.379	.307	.758	4.7	5.8	2.1	0.2	13.3
1999–00	Golden State	73	72	33.7	.391	.336	.705	3.7	6.7	2.0	0.3	11.3
2000–01	Golden State	69	59	34.1	.396	.324	.697	3.9	6.7	2.4	0.3	11.0
2001–02	Golden State	35	0	17.1	.342	.357	.500	1.5	3.3	0.7	0.1	3.4
Career		889	800	34.9	.409	.336	.736	4.1	6.7	2.3	0.3	13.5
All-Star		1	0	16.0	.400	.500	—	1.0	2.0	2.0	—	5.0

=== Playoffs ===
Year	Team	GP	GS	MPG	FG%	3P%	FT%	RPG	APG	SPG	BPG	PPG
1992	New Jersey	4	4	37.0	.309	.167	.750	4.0	7.8	**3.8**	0.5	9.5
1993	Atlanta	3	3	33.0	.360	.333	**.833**	4.3	4.3	1.0	**1.3**	9.0
1994	Atlanta	**11**	**11**	37.7	.340	.344	**.833**	5.0	**8.9**	2.2	0.5	13.0
1995	Atlanta	3	3	40.3	.367	**.393**	.636	4.3	5.7	1.3	0.0	**18.0**
1996	Atlanta	10	10	42.6	**.421**	**.393**	.667	4.3	6.4	2.2	0.8	17.1
1997	Atlanta	10	10	**44.1**	.396	.329	.667	**7.0**	6.5	2.1	0.2	16.4
1998	Atlanta	4	4	38.3	.415	.296	.583	5.0	8.3	2.3	0.3	14.8
1999	Atlanta	9	9	39.8	.326	.353	.467	4.0	4.0	2.0	0.2	12.6
Career		54	54	40.0	.370	.350	.683	4.9	6.6	2.1	0.4	14.2

== In popular culture ==
As fans of the basketball player, the band members of Pearl Jam originally named their group "Mookie Blaylock", but they were forced to change the name. They settled on naming their debut album Ten after Blaylock's jersey number.

In Tom Robbins's 1994 novel Half Asleep in Frog Pajamas, character Larry Diamond uses the name "Mookie Blaylock" as a pseudonym for hotel stays.

In the Homestar Runner cartoon "Kick-A-Ball", the Umpire tells the Announcer that Mookie Blaylock gave him the ball featured in the cartoon, a reference to a similar scene in an earlier cartoon about Mookie Wilson.

== Personal life ==
In 2011, two of Blaylock's sons, twins Daron and Zack, committed to play football for the University of Kentucky. The sons are graduates of Walton High School in Marietta, Georgia. His youngest son, Dominick, is also a graduate of Walton High School, and plays football for Georgia Tech, having transferred after previously playing for the University of Georgia. Mookie Betts, an outfielder for the Los Angeles Dodgers, was named after Blaylock. Blaylock resides in Zebulon, Georgia.

During the afternoon of May 31, 2013, Blaylock was involved in a head-on collision in Clayton County, Georgia. He was initially placed on life support, but his condition later improved. Blaylock's vehicle traveled left-of-center, causing the accident. A family member stated he had a history of seizures, and although it was unknown if Blaylock was experiencing any symptoms at the time of the collision, he was under doctor's orders to not drive due to the seizures. Blaylock had a history of alcohol abuse, and it was determined he suffered a seizure due to alcohol withdrawal. Although initially surviving the crash, a passenger in the other vehicle, Monica Murphy, a mother of five, died as a result of injuries from the collision. Blaylock was charged with vehicular homicide, driving on a suspended license and failing to stay in his lane. Blaylock had an outstanding warrant in Spalding County, Georgia on charges of DUI and drug-related offenses at the time, but "investigators did not believe alcohol was a factor in the crash." However, Blaylock had a history of DUIs, at least seven of them.

On October 27, 2014, Blaylock pleaded guilty to killing Murphy. Facing seven to 10 years at trial, Blaylock accepted a plea bargain. According to the plea, Blaylock served three years in prison and the fourth as a suspended sentence, followed by eight years of probation.

== See also ==
- List of NBA career assists leaders
- List of NBA career steals leaders
- List of NBA single-game assists leaders
- List of NBA single-game steals leaders
- List of NCAA Division I men's basketball players with 11 or more steals in a game
