= 1998 NBA playoffs =

Postseason tournament

Tournament details
- Dates: April 23–June 14, 1998
- Season: 1997–98
- Teams: 16

Final positions
- Champions: Chicago Bulls (6th title)
- Runners-up: Utah Jazz
- Semifinalists: Indiana Pacers; Los Angeles Lakers

Tournament statistics
- Scoring leader(s): Michael Jordan (Bulls) (32.4 PPG)

Awards
- MVP: Michael Jordan (Bulls)

The 1998 NBA playoffs was the postseason tournament of the National Basketball Association's 1997–98 season. The tournament concluded with the two-time defending NBA champion and Eastern Conference champion Chicago Bulls defeating the Western Conference champion Utah Jazz 4 games to 2 in the NBA Finals. The Bulls achieved a second three peat, a goal unrivaled since the Boston Celtics in 1966. Michael Jordan was named NBA Finals MVP for the sixth and final time.

== Overview ==
The New Jersey Nets made the playoffs for the first time since 1994, but did not appear again until 2002. Their presence was a mere asterisk compared to what they accomplished in 2002, getting swept by the eventual champion Bulls.

The Minnesota Timberwolves won their first playoff game in franchise history by winning Game 2 of their series against the Seattle SuperSonics. However, the SuperSonics prevailed in five games despite the Timberwolves taking a 2–1 series lead.

The Cleveland Cavaliers lost to Indiana in the first round 3–1 and did not appear again until 2006. It would also be the final playoff appearance for the Cavaliers without LeBron James on the roster.

The Heat–Knicks series was extremely notable for two reasons

- Game 4: A fight broke out between Larry Johnson and Alonzo Mourning at the end of the game (in which the Knicks won 90–85). A lasting image of the fight was Knicks coach Jeff Van Gundy clinging to Mourning's leg. Both players were suspended for two games. Johnson and Mourning had bad blood dating back to their stint as Charlotte Hornets teammates.
- Game 5: The New York Knicks became the fourth seventh seed to knock off a second seeded team in the first round of the playoffs. This would not occur again until 2010.

Game 5 of the Jazz–Rockets series would be the final game of Clyde Drexler's career.

The Los Angeles Lakers advanced to the Western Conference Finals for the first time since 1991. They were ultimately swept by the Jazz.

The Indiana Pacers entered the postseason with a franchise record 58 wins. Although they would lose to the Chicago Bulls in the Eastern Conference Finals, this team was later named by Pacers.com as the greatest in franchise history primarily due to their record, even better than the 2000 team that won the Eastern Conference Title. The Eastern Conference Finals series between the Chicago Bulls and Indiana Pacers was extremely notable for several reasons:

- Game 4: Reggie Miller's game winning 3 pointer with 0.7 seconds, which has been marked one of the greatest postseason moments in NBA History. Michael Jordan attempted a game winning 3 pointer of his own, but it rimmed out, effectively tying the series at 2–2.
- Game 6 of the Eastern Conference Finals: With a win, the Pacers took the Bulls to the limit by becoming 1 of only 2 teams to force a Game 7 in the Bulls' title years (the Knicks achieved this in 1992).
- Game 7: This was the first (and as of 2025, only) Game 7 to take place at the United Center.
- Game 7: This was the last Game 7 the Bulls would play until 2009.

For the first time since 1989 NBA Finals, there was a rematch of the same two teams: the Chicago Bulls and the Utah Jazz. This would not happen again until 2014.

Game 6 of the NBA Finals was extremely notable for several reasons:

- In the waning moments of the game Michael Jordan made the title winning shot over Bryon Russell. This moment was marked as one of the greatest moments in NBA playoff history.
- It was the highest rated and most watched game in NBA History, with 72 million viewers watching at least part of the game and an average of 35.9 million viewers in the U.S.
- It was the last Chicago Bulls postseason game until 2005 and the last involving the Michael Jordan-led Bulls.
- Michael Jordan's final NBA playoff game.
- Phil Jackson's final game as coach of the Chicago Bulls (he would go on to coach the Los Angeles Lakers two seasons later).
- As of 2026, this remains the most recent NBA Finals game for the Chicago Bulls and the Utah Jazz.

== Bracket ==
Teams in bold advanced to the next round. The numbers to the left of each team indicate the team's seeding in its conference, and the numbers to the right indicate the number of games the team won in that round. The division champions are marked by an asterisk. Teams with home court advantage are shown in Italics.

First Round	Conference Semifinals
**E1**	**Chicago***	**3**
E8	New Jersey	0
**E1**	**Chicago***	**4**
E4	Charlotte	1
**E4**	**Charlotte**	**3**
E5	Atlanta	1
**Eastern Conference**
**E3**	**Indiana**	**3**
E6	Cleveland	1
**E3**	**Indiana**	**4**
E7	New York	1
E2	Miami*	2
**E7**	**New York**	**3**
**W1**	**Utah***	**3**
W8	Houston	2
**W1**	**Utah***	**4**
W5	San Antonio	1
W4	Phoenix	1
**W5**	**San Antonio**	**3**
**Western Conference**
**W3**	**LA Lakers**	**3**
W6	Portland	1
**W3**	**LA Lakers**	**4**
W2	Seattle*	1
**W2**	**Seattle***	**3**
W7	Minnesota	2

Conference Finals
**E1**	**Chicago***	**4**
E3	Indiana	3
**W1**	**Utah***	**4**
W3	LA Lakers	0

NBA Finals
**E1**	**Chicago***	**4**
W1	Utah*	2

- * Division winner
- **Bold** Series winner
- Italic Team with home-court advantage

== Playoff qualifying ==
=== Western Conference ===
==== Home court advantage ====
The Utah Jazz and Chicago Bulls tied for the best record in the NBA. However, Utah won the season series 2–0 and was awarded home court advantage throughout the playoffs.

==== Clinched a playoff berth ====
The following teams clinched a playoff berth in the West:

1. Utah Jazz (62–20, clinched Midwest division)
2. Seattle SuperSonics (61–21, clinched Pacific division)
3. Los Angeles Lakers (61–21)
4. Phoenix Suns (56–26)
5. San Antonio Spurs (56–26)
6. Portland Trail Blazers (46–36)
7. Minnesota Timberwolves (45–37)
8. Houston Rockets (41–41)

=== Eastern Conference ===
==== Best record in conference ====
The Chicago Bulls clinched the best record in the East, and earned home court advantage throughout the Eastern Conference playoffs.

==== Clinched a playoff berth ====
The following teams clinched a playoff berth in the East:

1. Chicago Bulls (62–20, clinched Central division)
2. Miami Heat (55–27, clinched Atlantic division)
3. Indiana Pacers (58–24)
4. Charlotte Hornets (51–31)
5. Atlanta Hawks (50–32)
6. Cleveland Cavaliers (47–35)
7. New York Knicks (43–39)
8. New Jersey Nets (43–39)

== First round ==
=== Eastern Conference first round ===
==== (1) Chicago Bulls vs. (8) New Jersey Nets ====
TNT

April 24
8:00 PM

Boxscore

New Jersey Nets 93, Chicago Bulls 96 (OT)
Scoring by quarter: 27–31, 21–21, 14–20, 27–17, Overtime: 4–7
Pts: Chris Gatling 24; Rebs: Jayson Williams 21; Asts: Sherman Douglas 5	Pts: Michael Jordan 39; Rebs: Dennis Rodman 8 Asts: three players 5 each
Chicago leads series, 1–0

United Center, Chicago, Illinois
Attendance: 23,844
Referees: Joe Crawford, Bernie Fryer, Luis Grillo

NBC

April 26
5:30 PM

Boxscore

New Jersey Nets 91, Chicago Bulls 96
Scoring by quarter: 17–21, 19–31, 29–24, 26–20
Pts: Kerry Kittles 23; Rebs: Jayson Williams 11; Asts: Sherman Douglas 12	Pts: Michael Jordan 32; Rebs: Dennis Rodman 16; Asts: Rodman, Burrell 4 each
Chicago leads series, 2–0

United Center, Chicago, Illinois
Attendance: 23,844
Referees: Dan Crawford, Joe DeRosa, Ron Garretson

TNT

April 29
7:00 PM

Boxscore

Chicago Bulls 116, New Jersey Nets 101
Scoring by quarter: 35–28, 26–24, 32–24, 23–25
Pts: Michael Jordan 38; Rebs: Dennis Rodman 17; Asts: Scottie Pippen 10	Pts: Sherman Douglas 19; Rebs: Jayson Williams 10; Asts: Sherman Douglas 8
Chicago wins series, 3–0

Continental Airlines Arena, East Rutherford, New Jersey
Attendance: 19,889
Referees: Jim Clark, Nolan Fine, Steve Javie

Regular-season series
Chicago won 4–0 in the regular-season series

November 8, 1997

Recap

New Jersey Nets 86, Chicago Bulls 99

United Center, Chicago, Illinois

December 20, 1997

Recap

Chicago Bulls 100, New Jersey Nets 92

Continental Airlines Arena, East Rutherford, New Jersey

January 23, 1998

Recap

Chicago Bulls 100, New Jersey Nets 98

Continental Airlines Arena, East Rutherford, New Jersey

March 16, 1998

Recap

New Jersey Nets 72, Chicago Bulls 88

United Center, Chicago, Illinois

This was the first playoff meeting between the Bulls and the Nets.

==== (2) Miami Heat vs. (7) New York Knicks ====
TBS

April 24
7:00 PM

Boxscore

New York Knicks 79, Miami Heat 94
Scoring by quarter: 17–30, 20–27, 26–16, 16–21
Pts: Larry Johnson 21; Rebs: Charles Oakley 12; Asts: Charles Oakley 4	Pts: Tim Hardaway 34; Rebs: P. J. Brown 10; Asts: Eric Murdock 5
Miami leads series, 1–0

Miami Arena, Miami, Florida
Attendance: 15,200
Referees: Dan Crawford, Joe DeRosa, Ron Garretson

NBC

April 26
12:30 PM

Boxscore

New York Knicks 96, Miami Heat 86
Scoring by quarter: 21–31, 29–19, 22–19, 24–17
Pts: John Starks 25; Rebs: Terry Cummings 14; Asts: Charlie Ward 7	Pts: Alonzo Mourning 30; Rebs: Alonzo Mourning 13; Asts: Tim Hardaway 7
Series tied, 1–1

Miami Arena, Miami, Florida
Attendance: 15,200
Referees: Joe Crawford, Bernie Fryer, Luis Grillo

TBS

April 28
7:00 PM

Boxscore

Miami Heat 91, New York Knicks 85
Scoring by quarter: 30–24, 26–20, 18–23, 17–18
Pts: Voshon Lenard 28; Rebs: Alonzo Mourning 9 Asts: Tim Hardaway 7	Pts: Allan Houston 27; Rebs: Johnson, Oakley 7 each Asts: four players 3 each
Miami leads series, 2–1

Madison Square Garden, New York City, New York
Attendance: 19,763
Referees: Dick Bavetta, Terry Durham, Tommy Nunez Sr.

TNT

April 30
8:00 PM

Boxscore

Miami Heat 85, New York Knicks 90
Scoring by quarter: 26–23, 21–24, 17–24, 21–19
Pts: Tim Hardaway 33; Rebs: P. J. Brown 9 Asts: Tim Hardaway 9	Pts: Houston, Johnson 18 each Rebs: Larry Johnson 9 Asts: Charlie Ward 7
Series tied, 2–2

Madison Square Garden, New York City, New York
Attendance: 19,763
Referees: Hugh Evans, Joe Forte, Tom Washington

Alonzo Mourning and Larry Johnson fight.

NBC

May 3
12:30 PM

Boxscore

New York Knicks 98, Miami Heat 81
Scoring by quarter: 20–15, 27–16, 23–30, 28–20
Pts: Allan Houston 30; Rebs: Buck Williams 14; Asts: Charlie Ward 14	Pts: Tim Hardaway 21; Rebs: P. J. Brown 10; Asts: Tim Hardaway 8
New York wins series, 3–2

Miami Arena, Miami, Florida
Attendance: 15,200
Referees: Jim Clark, Hue Hollins, Steve Javie

Regular-season series
Tied 2–2 in the regular-season series

January 28, 1998

Recap

New York Knicks 82, Miami Heat 86

Miami Arena, Miami

February 1, 1998

Recap

Miami Heat 83, New York Knicks 89

Madison Square Garden, New York City

April 8, 1998

Recap

Miami Heat 80, New York Knicks 83

Madison Square Garden, New York City

April 12, 1998

Recap

New York Knicks 81, Miami Heat 82

Miami Arena, Miami

This was the second playoff meeting between these two teams, with the Heat winning the first meeting.

Previous playoff series
Miami leads 1–0 in all-time playoff series

1997

Miami Heat 4, New York Knicks 3

1997 Eastern Conference Semifinals

==== (3) Indiana Pacers vs. (6) Cleveland Cavaliers ====
TNT

April 23
8:00 PM

Boxscore

Cleveland Cavaliers 77, Indiana Pacers 106
Scoring by quarter: 18–31, 23–31, 19–20, 17–24
Pts: Shawn Kemp 25; Rebs: Shawn Kemp 13; Asts: Brevin Knight 5	Pts: Chris Mullin 20; Rebs: Chris Mullin 6 Asts: Mark Jackson 10
Indiana leads series, 1–0

Market Square Arena, Indianapolis, Indiana
Attendance: 16,644
Referees: Nolan Fine, Bill Oakes, Eddie F. Rush

NBC

April 25
1:00 PM

Boxscore

Cleveland Cavaliers 86, Indiana Pacers 92
Scoring by quarter: 29–19, 22–21, 16–29, 19–23
Pts: Shawn Kemp 27; Rebs: Zydrunas Ilgauskas 10; Asts: Brevin Knight 7	Pts: Reggie Miller 18; Rebs: Dale Davis 10; Asts: Mark Jackson 11
Indiana leads series, 2–0

Market Square Arena, Indianapolis, Indiana
Attendance: 16,617
Referees: Mike Callahan, Bob Delaney, Jack Nies

TNT

April 27
7:00 PM

Boxscore

Indiana Pacers 77, Cleveland Cavaliers 86
Scoring by quarter: 27–22, 15–22, 19–21, 16–21
Pts: Rik Smits 26; Rebs: Dale Davis 9 Asts: Mark Jackson 17	Pts: Shawn Kemp 31; Rebs: Kemp, Knight 7 each Asts: three players 5 each
Indiana leads series, 2–1

Gund Arena, Cleveland, Ohio
Attendance: 17,495
Referees: Ted Bernhardt, Dan Crawford, Derrick Stafford

TBS

April 30
7:00 PM

Boxscore

Indiana Pacers 80, Cleveland Cavaliers 74
Scoring by quarter: 25–23, 20–13, 21–18, 14–20
Pts: Reggie Miller 19; Rebs: Antonio Davis 9 Asts: Mark Jackson 6	Pts: Shawn Kemp 21; Rebs: Shawn Kemp 12; Asts: Brevin Knight 6
Indiana wins series, 3–1

Gund Arena, Cleveland, Ohio
Attendance: 18,188
Referees: Dick Bavetta, Terry Durham, Tommy Nunez Sr.

Regular-season series
Tied 2–2 in the regular-season series

November 4, 1997

Recap

Indiana Pacers 77, Cleveland Cavaliers 80

Gund Arena, Cleveland, Ohio

January 30, 1998

Recap

Cleveland Cavaliers 83, Indiana Pacers 89

Market Square Arena, Indianapolis

April 7, 1998

Recap

Cleveland Cavaliers 80, Indiana Pacers 82

Market Square Arena, Indianapolis

April 18, 1998

Recap

Indiana Pacers 92, Cleveland Cavaliers 96

Gund Arena, Cleveland

This was the first playoff meeting between the Cavaliers and the Pacers.

==== (4) Charlotte Hornets vs. (5) Atlanta Hawks ====
TBS

April 23
7:00 PM

Boxscore

Atlanta Hawks 87, Charlotte Hornets 97
Scoring by quarter: 29–23, 25–31, 15–21, 18–22
Pts: Steve Smith 35; Rebs: Dikembe Mutombo 15; Asts: Mookie Blaylock 9	Pts: Glen Rice 34; Rebs: Divac, Mason 7 each Asts: David Wesley 12
Charlotte leads series, 1–0

Charlotte Coliseum, Charlotte, North Carolina
Attendance: 19,176
Referees: Bob Delaney, David Jones, Jack Nies

TNT

April 25
8:00 PM

Boxscore

Atlanta Hawks 85, Charlotte Hornets 92
Scoring by quarter: 27–19, 21–24, 14–19, 23–30
Pts: Henderson, Smith 22 each Rebs: Henderson, Mutombo 9 each Asts: Mookie Blaylock 13	Pts: Anthony Mason 25; Rebs: Glen Rice 13; Asts: Divac, Wesley 6 each
Charlotte leads series, 2–0

Charlotte Coliseum, Charlotte, North Carolina
Attendance: 20,390
Referees: Ted Bernhardt, Bill Oakes, Eddie F. Rush

TNT

April 28
8:00 PM

Boxscore

Charlotte Hornets 64, Atlanta Hawks 96
Scoring by quarter: 18–30, 14–21, 12–23, 20–22
Pts: Anthony Mason 12; Rebs: Vlade Divac 7 Asts: Divac, Wesley 5 each	Pts: Mookie Blaylock 16; Rebs: Dikembe Mutombo 11; Asts: Mookie Blaylock 7
Charlotte leads series, 2–1

Georgia Dome, Atlanta, Georgia
Attendance: 19,745
Referees: Mike Callahan, Hugh Evans, Ron Garretson

TNT

May 1
7:00 PM

Boxscore

Charlotte Hornets 91, Atlanta Hawks 82
Scoring by quarter: 18–24, 17–17, 31–23, 25–18
Pts: Anthony Mason 29; Rebs: Anthony Mason 14; Asts: David Wesley 10	Pts: Steve Smith 27; Rebs: Dikembe Mutombo 16; Asts: Mookie Blaylock 4
Charlotte wins series, 3–1

Georgia Dome, Atlanta, Georgia
Attendance: 22,074
Referees: Jim Clark, Hue Hollins, Bill Spooner

Regular-season series
Atlanta won 4–0 in the regular-season series

November 29, 1997

Recap

Charlotte Hornets 80, Atlanta Hawks 98

Georgia Dome, Atlanta

January 31, 1998

Recap

Atlanta Hawks 103, Charlotte Hornets 83

Charlotte Coliseum, Charlotte, North Carolina

April 10, 1998

Recap

Atlanta Hawks 99, Charlotte Hornets 87

Charlotte Coliseum, Charlotte, North Carolina

April 17, 1998

Recap

Charlotte Hornets 104, Atlanta Hawks 121

Georgia Dome, Atlanta

This was the first playoff meeting between the Hawks and the Hornets.

=== Western Conference first round ===
==== (1) Utah Jazz vs. (8) Houston Rockets ====
TBS

April 23
9:30 PM

Boxscore

Houston Rockets 103, Utah Jazz 90
Scoring by quarter: 27–24, 24–20, 28–14, 24–32
Pts: Clyde Drexler 22; Rebs: Kevin Willis 14; Asts: Clyde Drexler 6	Pts: Karl Malone 25; Rebs: Karl Malone 11; Asts: John Stockton 8
Houston leads series, 1–0

Delta Center, Salt Lake City, Utah
Attendance: 19,911
Referees: Dick Bavetta, Jim Clark, Ed Middleton

TNT

April 25
10:30 PM

Boxscore

Houston Rockets 90, Utah Jazz 105
Scoring by quarter: 19–29, 23–18, 18–32, 30–26
Pts: Hakeem Olajuwon 16; Rebs: Kevin Willis 12; Asts: Matt Maloney 6	Pts: Karl Malone 29; Rebs: Greg Ostertag 11; Asts: John Stockton 10
Series tied, 1–1

Delta Center, Salt Lake City, Utah
Attendance: 19,911
Referees: Hugh Evans, Ken Mauer, Ronnie Nunn

TBS

April 29
9:30 PM

Boxscore

Utah Jazz 85, Houston Rockets 89
Scoring by quarter: 19–26, 24–21, 26–26, 16–16
Pts: Malone, Russell 19 each Rebs: Karl Malone 14; Asts: Stockton, Eisley 6 each	Pts: Hakeem Olajuwon 28; Rebs: Hakeem Olajuwon 12; Asts: Drexler, Maloney 5 each
Houston leads series, 2–1

Compaq Center, Houston, Texas
Attendance: 16,285
Referees: Hue Hollins, Bill Spooner, Derrick Stafford

TNT

May 1
9:30 PM

Boxscore

Utah Jazz 93, Houston Rockets 71
Scoring by quarter: 10–21, 26–21, 29–19, 28–10
Pts: Karl Malone 29; Rebs: Karl Malone 13; Asts: John Stockton 7	Pts: Hakeem Olajuwon 27; Rebs: Hakeem Olajuwon 15; Asts: Clyde Drexler 5
Series tied, 2–2

Compaq Center, Houston, Texas
Attendance: 16,285
Referees: Ron Garretson, Steve Javie, Greg Willard

NBC

May 3
3:00 PM

Boxscore

Houston Rockets 70, Utah Jazz 84
Scoring by quarter: 14–21, 19–18, 21–22, 16–23
Pts: Kevin Willis 16; Rebs: Kevin Willis 11; Asts: three players 3 each	Pts: Karl Malone 31; Rebs: Karl Malone 15; Asts: John Stockton 10
Utah wins series, 3–2

Delta Center, Salt Lake City, Utah
Attendance: 19,911
Referees: Dan Crawford, Joe Crawford, Bob Delaney

Game 5 is Clyde Drexler's final NBA game.

Regular-season series
Utah won 4–0 in the regular-season series

December 25, 1997

Recap

Houston Rockets 103, Utah Jazz 107

Delta Center, Salt Lake City

January 10, 1998

Recap

Utah Jazz 111, Houston Rockets 84

The Summit, Houston, Texas

March 1, 1998

Recap

Utah Jazz 106, Houston Rockets 100

Compaq Center, Houston, Texas

March 9, 1998

Recap

Houston Rockets 93, Utah Jazz 100

Delta Center, Salt Lake City

This was the fifth playoff meeting between these two teams, with each team winning two series apiece.

Previous playoff series
Tied 2–2 in all-time playoff series

1985

Houston Rockets 2, Utah Jazz 3

1985 Western Conference First Round

1994

Houston Rockets 4, Utah Jazz 1

1994 Western Conference Finals

1995

Houston Rockets 3, Utah Jazz 2

1995 Western Conference First Round

1997

Houston Rockets 2, Utah Jazz 4

1997 Western Conference Finals

==== (2) Seattle SuperSonics vs. (7) Minnesota Timberwolves ====
TBS

April 24
9:30 PM

Boxscore

Minnesota Timberwolves 83, Seattle SuperSonics 108
Scoring by quarter: 21–34, 11–19, 26–29, 25–26
Pts: Kevin Garnett 18; Rebs: Kevin Garnett 18; Asts: Stephon Marbury 5	Pts: Vin Baker 25; Rebs: Vin Baker 12; Asts: Gary Payton 7
Seattle leads series, 1–0

KeyArena, Seattle, Washington
Attendance: 17,072
Referees: Joe Forte, Hue Hollins, Greg Willard

TNT

April 26
9:00 PM

Boxscore

Minnesota Timberwolves 98, Seattle SuperSonics 93
Scoring by quarter: 28–20, 22–25, 27–26, 21–22
Pts: Stephon Marbury 25; Rebs: Anthony Peeler 14; Asts: Stephon Marbury 7	Pts: Gary Payton 32; Rebs: Detlef Schrempf 10; Asts: Nate McMillan 6
Series tied, 1–1

KeyArena, Seattle, Washington
Attendance: 17,072
Referees: Terry Durhame, Steve Javie, Ron Olesiak

TBS

April 28
9:30 PM

Boxscore

Seattle SuperSonics 90, Minnesota Timberwolves 98
Scoring by quarter: 28–24, 18–26, 26–17, 18–31
Pts: Gary Payton 26; Rebs: Vin Baker 12; Asts: three players 5 each	Pts: Anthony Peeler 20; Rebs: Kevin Garnett 8 Asts: Stephon Marbury 11
Minnesota leads series, 2–1

Target Center, Minneapolis, Minnesota
Attendance: 19,006
Referees: Joe Crawford, Ronnie Nunn, Tom Washington

TBS

April 30
9:30 PM

Boxscore

Seattle SuperSonics 92, Minnesota Timberwolves 88
Scoring by quarter: 28–21, 18–22, 21–20, 25–25
Pts: Payton, Hawkins 24 each Rebs: Vin Baker 12; Asts: Gary Payton 8	Pts: Kevin Garnett 20; Rebs: Kevin Garnett 10; Asts: Stephon Marbury 7
Series tied, 2–2

Target Center, Minneapolis, Minnesota
Attendance: 19,006
Referees: Joe DeRosa, Bill Oakes, Eddie F. Rush

NBC

May 2
3:30 PM

Boxscore

Minnesota Timberwolves 84, Seattle SuperSonics 97
Scoring by quarter: 27–24, 20–20, 17–27, 20–26
Pts: Anthony Peeler 28; Rebs: Reggie Jordan 8 Asts: Stephon Marbury 8	Pts: Gary Payton 29; Rebs: Detlef Schrempf 11; Asts: three players 4 each
Seattle wins series, 3–2

KeyArena, Seattle, Washington
Attendance: 17,072
Referees: Dick Bavetta, Bernie Fryer, Jack Nies

Regular-season series
Seattle won 3–1 in the regular-season series

December 9, 1997

Recap

Seattle SuperSonics 108, Minnesota Timberwolves 99

Target Center, Minneapolis

December 23, 1997

Recap

Minnesota Timberwolves 112, Seattle SuperSonics 103

KeyArena, Seattle

March 8, 1998

Recap

Seattle SuperSonics 99, Minnesota Timberwolves 98

Target Center, Minneapolis

March 14, 1998

Recap

Minnesota Timberwolves 80, Seattle SuperSonics 114

KeyArena, Seattle

This was the first playoff meeting between the Timberwolves and the SuperSonics.

==== (3) Los Angeles Lakers vs. (6) Portland Trail Blazers ====
TNT

April 24
10:30 PM

Boxscore

Portland Trail Blazers 102, Los Angeles Lakers 104
Scoring by quarter: 30–25, 23–22, 21–27, 28–30
Pts: Isaiah Rider 25; Rebs: Brian Grant 12; Asts: Damon Stoudamire 10	Pts: Shaquille O'Neal 30; Rebs: O'Neal, Jones 7 each Asts: Robert Horry 5
LA Lakers lead series, 1–0

Great Western Forum, Inglewood, California
Attendance: 17,505
Referees: Terry Durham, Steve Javie, Tommy Nunez Sr.

NBC

April 26
3:00 PM

Boxscore

Portland Trail Blazers 99, Los Angeles Lakers 108
Scoring by quarter: 21–29, 31–25, 23–35, 24–19
Pts: Isaiah Rider 24; Rebs: three players 7 each Asts: Damon Stoudamire 14	Pts: Rick Fox 24; Rebs: Shaquille O'Neal 9 Asts: Derek Fisher 7
LA Lakers lead series, 2–0

Great Western Forum, Inglewood, California
Attendance: 17,505
Referees: Joe Forte, Hue Hollins, Greg Willard

TNT

April 28
10:30 PM

Boxscore

Los Angeles Lakers 94, Portland Trail Blazers 99
Scoring by quarter: 19–23, 31–25, 22–21, 22–30
Pts: Shaquille O'Neal 36; Rebs: Shaquille O'Neal 16; Asts: Robert Horry 7	Pts: Rider, Stoudamire 18 each Rebs: Brian Grant 12; Asts: Damon Stoudamire 6
LA Lakers lead series, 2–1

Rose Garden, Portland, Oregon
Attendance: 21,558
Referees: Ed Middleton, Jack Nies, Ron Olesiak

TNT

April 30
10:30 PM

Boxscore

Los Angeles Lakers 110, Portland Trail Blazers 99
Scoring by quarter: 28–19, 28–21, 22–25, 32–34
Pts: Shaquille O'Neal 31; Rebs: Shaquille O'Neal 15; Asts: Nick Van Exel 7	Pts: Damon Stoudamire 24; Rebs: Brian Grant 12; Asts: Damon Stoudamire 8
LA Lakers win series, 3–1

Rose Garden, Portland, Oregon
Attendance: 21,616
Referees: Joe Crawford, Ken Mauer, Ronnie Nunn

Regular-season series
Tied 2–2 in the regular-season series

December 8, 1997

Recap

Los Angeles Lakers 99, Portland Trail Blazers 105

Rose Garden, Portland, Oregon

February 4, 1998

Recap

Portland Trail Blazers 115, Los Angeles Lakers 122

Great Western Forum, Inglewood, California

February 10, 1998

Recap

Los Angeles Lakers 105, Portland Trail Blazers 117

Rose Garden, Portland, Oregon

March 11, 1998

Recap

Portland Trail Blazers 107, Los Angeles Lakers 121

Great Western Forum, Inglewood, California

This was the eighth playoff meeting between these two teams, with the Lakers winning five of the first seven meetings.

Previous playoff series
Los Angeles leads 5–2 in all-time playoff series

1977

Los Angeles Lakers 0, Portland Trail Blazers 4

1977 Western Conference Finals

1983

Los Angeles Lakers 4, Portland Trail Blazers 1

1983 Western Conference Semifinals

1985

Los Angeles Lakers 4, Portland Trail Blazers 1

1985 Western Conference Semifinals

1989

Los Angeles Lakers 3, Portland Trail Blazers 0

1989 Western Conference First Round

1991

Los Angeles Lakers 4, Portland Trail Blazers 2

1991 Western Conference Finals

1992

Los Angeles Lakers 1, Portland Trail Blazers 3

1992 Western Conference First Round

1997

Los Angeles Lakers 3, Portland Trail Blazers 1

1997 Western Conference First Round

==== (4) Phoenix Suns vs. (5) San Antonio Spurs ====
TNT

April 23
10:30 PM

Boxscore

San Antonio Spurs 102, Phoenix Suns 96
Scoring by quarter: 23–21, 22–29, 22–25, 35–21
Pts: Tim Duncan 32; Rebs: David Robinson 15; Asts: Vinny Del Negro 6	Pts: Kevin Johnson 18; Rebs: George McCloud 9 Asts: Jason Kidd 11
San Antonio leads series, 1–0

America West Arena, Phoenix, Arizona
Attendance: 19,023
Referees: Hugh Evans, Ken Mauer, Ronnie Munn

NBC

April 25
3:30 PM

Boxscore

San Antonio Spurs 101, Phoenix Suns 108
Scoring by quarter: 22–24, 25–27, 24–32, 30–25
Pts: David Robinson 23; Rebs: David Robinson 16; Asts: Avery Johnson 8	Pts: George McCloud 22; Rebs: Antonio McDyess 11; Asts: Jason Kidd 10
Series tied, 1–1

America West Arena, Phoenix, Arizona
Attendance: 19,023
Referees: Dick Bavetta, Jim Clark, Bill Spooner

TNT

April 27
9:30 PM

Boxscore

Phoenix Suns 88, San Antonio Spurs 100
Scoring by quarter: 17–20, 27–24, 15–27, 29–29
Pts: Antonio McDyess 26; Rebs: Antonio McDyess 17; Asts: Kidd, Johnson 6 each	Pts: Tim Duncan 22; Rebs: Tim Duncan 14; Asts: Avery Johnson 5
San Antonio leads series, 2–1

Alamodome, San Antonio, Texas
Attendance: 20,486
Referees: Bob Delaney, Bill Oakes, Mark Wunderlich

TBS

April 29
8:00 PM

Boxscore

Phoenix Suns 80, San Antonio Spurs 99
Scoring by quarter: 23–20, 18–21, 14–21, 25–37
Pts: Kevin Johnson 18; Rebs: Antonio McDyess 19; Asts: Steve Nash 5	Pts: Avery Johnson 30; Rebs: David Robinson 21; Asts: Avery Johnson 7
San Antonio wins series, 3–1

Alamodome, San Antonio, Texas
Attendance: 27,528
Referees: Dan Crawford, Bernie Fryer, David Jones

Regular-season series
Phoenix won 3–1 in the regular-season series

January 9, 1998

Recap

San Antonio Spurs 79, Phoenix Suns 100

America West Arena, Phoenix, Arizona

February 14, 1998

Recap

Phoenix Suns 94, San Antonio Spurs 81

Alamodome, San Antonio

February 22, 1998

Recap

San Antonio Spurs 79, Phoenix Suns 97

America West Arena, Phoenix, Arizona

March 22, 1998

Recap

Phoenix Suns 83, San Antonio Spurs 93

Alamodome, San Antonio

This was the fourth playoff meeting between these two teams, with the Suns winning two of the first three meetings.

Previous playoff series
Phoenix leads 2–1 in all-time playoff series

1992

Phoenix Suns 3, San Antonio Spurs 0

1992 Western Conference First Round

1993

Phoenix Suns 4, San Antonio Spurs 2

1993 Western Conference Semifinals

1996

Phoenix Suns 1, San Antonio Spurs 3

1996 Western Conference First Round

== Conference semifinals ==
=== Eastern Conference semifinals ===
==== (1) Chicago Bulls vs. (4) Charlotte Hornets ====
NBC

May 3
5:30 PM

Boxscore

Charlotte Hornets 70, Chicago Bulls 83
Scoring by quarter: 23–15, 15–22, 10–21, 22–25
Pts: Glen Rice 25; Rebs: Vlade Divac 14; Asts: David Wesley 9	Pts: Michael Jordan 35; Rebs: Dennis Rodman 14; Asts: Jordan, Pippen 4 each
Chicago leads series, 1–0

United Center, Chicago, Illinois
Attendance: 23,844
Referees: Ronnie Nunn, Bill Oakes, Greg Willard

TNT

May 6
8:00 PM

Boxscore

Charlotte Hornets 78, Chicago Bulls 76
Scoring by quarter: 13–17, 17–19, 19–21, 29–19
Pts: Anthony Mason 15; Rebs: Vlade Divac 19; Asts: Mason, Rice 4 each	Pts: Michael Jordan 22; Rebs: Dennis Rodman 18; Asts: Michael Jordan 6
Series tied, 1–1

United Center, Chicago, Illinois
Attendance: 23,844
Referees: Ted Bernhardt, Joe Crawford, Eddie F. Rush

TNT

May 8
8:00 PM

Boxscore

Chicago Bulls 103, Charlotte Hornets 89
Scoring by quarter: 25–24, 28–18, 25–21, 25–26
Pts: Michael Jordan 27; Rebs: Dennis Rodman 17; Asts: Michael Jordan 6	Pts: Glen Rice 31; Rebs: Vlade Divac 13; Asts: David Wesley 8
Chicago leads series, 2–1

Charlotte Coliseum, Charlotte, North Carolina
Attendance: 23,799
Referees: Dick Bavetta, Jim Clark, Ron Olesiak

NBC

May 10
5:30 PM

Boxscore

Chicago Bulls 94, Charlotte Hornets 80
Scoring by quarter: 18–20, 26–20, 28–19, 22–21
Pts: Michael Jordan 31; Rebs: Dennis Rodman 18; Asts: Scottie Pippen 8	Pts: Vlade Divac 15; Rebs: Glen Rice 9 Asts: Anthony Mason 5
Chicago leads series, 3–1

Charlotte Coliseum, Charlotte, North Carolina
Attendance: 23,799
Referees: Bob Delaney, Steve Javie, Jack Nies

TNT

May 13
9:30 PM

Boxscore

Charlotte Hornets 84, Chicago Bulls 93
Scoring by quarter: 29–26, 16–23, 25–24, 14–20
Pts: Glen Rice 30; Rebs: Vlade Divac 15; Asts: three players 5	Pts: Michael Jordan 33; Rebs: Dennis Rodman 21; Asts: Pippen, Longley 5 each
Chicago wins series, 4–1

United Center, Chicago, Illinois
Attendance: 23,844
Referees: Dan Crawford, Ron Garretson, Luis Grillo

Regular-season series
Chicago won 3–1 in the regular-season series

November 14, 1997

Recap

Charlotte Hornets 92, Chicago Bulls 105

United Center, Chicago, Illinois

December 12, 1997

Recap

Chicago Bulls 77, Charlotte Hornets 79

Charlotte Coliseum, Charlotte, North Carolina

January 21, 1998

Recap

Charlotte Hornets 79, Chicago Bulls 110

United Center, Chicago, Illinois

February 11, 1998

Recap

Chicago Bulls 92, Charlotte Hornets 90

Charlotte Coliseum, Charlotte, North Carolina

This was the second playoff meeting between these two teams, with the Bulls winning the first meeting.

Previous playoff series
Chicago leads 1–0 in all-time playoff series

1995

Charlotte Hornets 1, Chicago Bulls 3

1995 Eastern Conference First Round

==== (3) Indiana Pacers vs. (7) New York Knicks ====
TNT

May 5
8:00 PM

Boxscore

New York Knicks 83, Indiana Pacers 93
Scoring by quarter: 31–13, 14–34, 19–26, 19–20
Pts: John Starks 17; Rebs: Charles Oakley 11; Asts: Charlie Ward 6	Pts: Reggie Miller 17; Rebs: Dale Davis 11; Asts: Mark Jackson 6
Indiana leads series, 1–0

Market Square Arena, Indianapolis, Indiana
Attendance: 16,630
Referees: Dan Crawford, Joe DeRosa, Ron Garretson

TNT

May 7
8:00 PM

Boxscore

New York Knicks 77, Indiana Pacers 85
Scoring by quarter: 18–23, 21–23, 22–18, 16–21
Pts: John Starks 20; Rebs: Charles Oakley 9 Asts: Charlie Ward 10	Pts: Rik Smits 22; Rebs: Dale Davis 9 Asts: Mark Jackson 5
Indiana leads series, 2–0

Market Square Arena, Indianapolis, Indiana
Attendance: 16,765
Referees: Hugh Evans, Joe Forte, Ken Mauer

NBC

May 9
1:00 PM

Boxscore

Indiana Pacers 76, New York Knicks 83
Scoring by quarter: 26–15, 17–33, 23–14, 10–21
Pts: Reggie Miller 23; Rebs: Dale Davis 9 Asts: Mark Jackson 9	Pts: Patrick Ewing 19; Rebs: Chris Mills 8 Asts: Chris Childs 5
Indiana leads series, 2–1

Madison Square Garden, New York City, New York
Attendance: 19,763
Referees: Hue Hollins, Tommy Nunez Sr., Bill Oakes

NBC

May 10
12:30 PM

Boxscore

Indiana Pacers 118, New York Knicks 107 (OT)
Scoring by quarter: 29–27, 25–28, 26–22, 22–25, Overtime: 16–5
Pts: Reggie Miller 38; Rebs: Antonio Davis 9 Asts: Mark Jackson 15	Pts: Houston, Starks 19 each Rebs: Charles Oakley 10; Asts: Chris Childs 6
Indiana leads series, 3–1

Madison Square Garden, New York City, New York
Attendance: 19,763
Referees: Dick Bavetta, Jim Clark, Terry Durham

Reggie Miller hits the game-tying 3 with 5.1 seconds left to force OT.

TNT

May 13
7:00 PM

Boxscore

New York Knicks 88, Indiana Pacers 99
Scoring by quarter: 25–29, 18–18, 18–21, 27–31
Pts: Allan Houston 33; Rebs: Patrick Ewing 7 Asts: Patrick Ewing 11	Pts: Reggie Miller 24; Rebs: Mark Jackson 14; Asts: Mark Jackson 13
Indiana wins series, 4–1

Market Square Arena, Indianapolis, Indiana
Attendance: 16,767
Referees: Bob Delaney, Bernie Fryer, Steve Javie

Regular-season series
Indiana won 2–1 in the regular-season series

December 17, 1997

Recap

New York Knicks 80, Indiana Pacers 87

Market Square Arena, Indianapolis

January 21, 1998

Recap

Indiana Pacers 89, New York Knicks 97

Madison Square Garden, New York City

March 15, 1998

Recap

Indiana Pacers 91, New York Knicks 86

Madison Square Garden, New York City

This was the fourth playoff meeting between these two teams, with the Knicks winning two of the first three meetings.

Previous playoff series
New York leads 2–1 in all-time playoff series

1993

Indiana Pacers 1, New York Knicks 3

1993 Eastern Conference First Round

1994

Indiana Pacers 3, New York Knicks 4

1994 Eastern Conference Finals

1995

Indiana Pacers 4, New York Knicks 3

1995 Eastern Conference Semifinals

=== Western Conference semifinals ===
==== (1) Utah Jazz vs. (5) San Antonio Spurs ====
TNT

May 5
10:30 PM

Boxscore

San Antonio Spurs 82, Utah Jazz 83
Scoring by quarter: 16–26, 30–26, 14–16, 22–15
Pts: Tim Duncan 33; Rebs: David Robinson 16; Asts: Avery Johnson 8	Pts: Karl Malone 25; Rebs: Karl Malone 8 Asts: John Stockton 8
Utah leads series, 1–0

Delta Center, Salt Lake City, Utah
Attendance: 19,911
Referees: Dick Bavetta, Jack Nies, Tommy Nunez Sr.

TNT

May 7
10:30 PM

Boxscore

San Antonio Spurs 106, Utah Jazz 109 (OT)
Scoring by quarter: 22–20, 30–31, 23–28, 23–19, Overtime: 8–11
Pts: Tim Duncan 26; Rebs: David Robinson 14; Asts: Vinny Del Negro 5	Pts: Karl Malone 22; Rebs: Karl Malone 12; Asts: John Stockton 12
Utah leads series, 2–0

Delta Center, Salt Lake City, Utah
Attendance: 19,911
Referees: Terry Durham, Hue Hollins, Bill Oakes

NBC

May 9
3:30 PM

Boxscore

Utah Jazz 64, San Antonio Spurs 86
Scoring by quarter: 14–25, 21–28, 9–18, 20–15
Pts: Karl Malone 18; Rebs: Greg Ostertag 9 Asts: Hornacek, Vaughn 3 each	Pts: David Robinson 21; Rebs: Will Perdue 11; Asts: Avery Johnson 5
Utah leads series, 2–1

Alamodome, San Antonio, Texas
Attendance: 26,086
Referees: Hugh Evans, Ron Garretson, Derrick Stafford

TNT

May 10
9:00 PM

Boxscore

Utah Jazz 82, San Antonio Spurs 73
Scoring by quarter: 25–22, 18–17, 21–13, 18–21
Pts: Karl Malone 34; Rebs: Karl Malone 12; Asts: John Stockton 7	Pts: Tim Duncan 22; Rebs: David Robinson 11; Asts: Avery Johnson 7
Utah leads series, 3–1

Alamodome, San Antonio, Texas
Attendance: 28,587
Referees: Dan Crawford, Joe DeRosa, Ronnie Nunn

TNT

May 12
8:00 PM

Boxscore

San Antonio Spurs 77, Utah Jazz 87
Scoring by quarter: 14–19, 19–24, 18–18, 26–26
Pts: David Robinson 21; Rebs: David Robinson 13; Asts: Avery Johnson 8	Pts: Karl Malone 24; Rebs: Karl Malone 13; Asts: Howard Eisley 7
Utah wins series, 4–1

Delta Center, Salt Lake City, Utah
Attendance: 19,911
Referees: Joe Crawford, Joe Forte, Eddie F. Rush

Regular-season series
Utah won 3–1 in the regular-season series

November 8, 1997

Recap

Utah Jazz 80, San Antonio Spurs 87

Alamodome, San Antonio

November 22, 1997

Recap

San Antonio Spurs 74, Utah Jazz 103

Delta Center, Salt Lake City

February 21, 1998

Recap

Utah Jazz 79, San Antonio Spurs 77

Alamodome, San Antonio

April 8, 1998

Recap

San Antonio Spurs 88, Utah Jazz 98

Delta Center, Salt Lake City

This was the third playoff meeting between these two teams, with the Jazz winning the first two meetings.

Previous playoff series
Utah leads 2–0 in all-time playoff series

1994

San Antonio Spurs 1, Utah Jazz 3

1994 Western Conference First Round

1996

San Antonio Spurs 2, Utah Jazz 4

1996 Western Conference Semifinals

==== (2) Seattle SuperSonics vs. (3) Los Angeles Lakers ====
TNT

May 4
9:00 PM

Boxscore

Los Angeles Lakers 92, Seattle SuperSonics 106
Scoring by quarter: 32–29, 18–33, 29–16, 13–28
Pts: Shaquille O'Neal 27; Rebs: Shaquille O'Neal 11; Asts: Rick Fox 10	Pts: Gary Payton 25; Rebs: Hawkins, Baker 8 each Asts: Gary Payton 6
Seattle leads series, 1–0

KeyArena, Seattle, Washington
Attendance: 17,072
Referees: Hugh Evans, Joe Forte, Derrick Stafford

TNT

May 6
10:30 PM

Boxscore

Los Angeles Lakers 92, Seattle SuperSonics 68
Scoring by quarter: 19–26, 25–11, 20–12, 28–19
Pts: Shaquille O'Neal 26; Rebs: O'Neal, Horry 10 each Asts: Derek Fisher 7	Pts: Vin Baker 13; Rebs: Detlef Schrempf 8 Asts: Gary Payton 5
Series tied, 1–1

KeyArena, Seattle, Washington
Attendance: 17,072
Referees: Bob Delaney, Luis Grillo, Steve Javie

TNT

May 8
10:30 PM

Boxscore

Seattle SuperSonics 103, Los Angeles Lakers 119
Scoring by quarter: 28–27, 23–29, 23–31, 29–32
Pts: Detlef Schrempf 26; Rebs: Vin Baker 12; Asts: Gary Payton 13	Pts: Shaquille O'Neal 30; Rebs: Shaquille O'Neal 10; Asts: Derek Fisher 7
LA Lakers lead series, 2–1

Great Western Forum, Inglewood, California
Attendance: 17,505
Referees: Dan Crawford, Bernie Fryer, Ronnie Nunn

NBC

May 10
3:00 PM

Boxscore

Seattle SuperSonics 100, Los Angeles Lakers 112
Scoring by quarter: 28–30, 27–27, 25–33, 20–22
Pts: Gary Payton 31; Rebs: Gary Payton 8 Asts: Gary Payton 13	Pts: Shaquille O'Neal 39; Rebs: Shaquille O'Neal 8 Asts: O'Neal, Van Exel 7 each
LA Lakers lead series, 3–1

Great Western Forum, Inglewood, California
Attendance: 17,505
Referees: Joe Crawford, Eddie F. Rush, Greg Willard

TNT

May 12
10:30 PM

Boxscore

Los Angeles Lakers 110, Seattle SuperSonics 95
Scoring by quarter: 39–22, 23–28, 24–26, 24–19
Pts: Shaquille O'Neal 31; Rebs: Robert Horry 11; Asts: Derek Fisher 6	Pts: Vin Baker 28; Rebs: Vin Baker 9 Asts: Hersey Hawkins 6
LA Lakers win series, 4–1

KeyArena, Seattle, Washington
Attendance: 17,072
Referees: Dick Bavetta, Ken Mauer, Bill Oakes

Regular-season series
Seattle won 3–1 in the regular-season series

January 24, 1998

Recap

Los Angeles Lakers 95, Seattle SuperSonics 101

KeyArena, Seattle

February 13, 1998

Recap

Seattle SuperSonics 113, Los Angeles Lakers 108

Great Western Forum, Inglewood, California

March 16, 1998

Recap

Los Angeles Lakers 89, Seattle SuperSonics 101

KeyArena, Seattle

March 20, 1998

Recap

Seattle SuperSonics 80, Los Angeles Lakers 93

Great Western Forum, Inglewood, California

This was the seventh playoff meeting between these two teams, with the Lakers winning four of the first six meetings.

Previous playoff series
Los Angeles leads 4–2 in all-time playoff series

1978

Los Angeles Lakers 1, Seattle SuperSonics 2

1978 Western Conference First Round

1979

Los Angeles Lakers 1, Seattle SuperSonics 4

1979 Western Conference Semifinals

1980

Los Angeles Lakers 4, Seattle SuperSonics 1

1980 Western Conference Finals

1987

Los Angeles Lakers 4, Seattle SuperSonics 0

1987 Western Conference Finals

1989

Los Angeles Lakers 4, Seattle SuperSonics 0

1989 Western Conference Semifinals

1995

Los Angeles Lakers 3, Seattle SuperSonics 1

1995 Western Conference First Round

== Conference finals ==
=== Eastern Conference finals ===
==== (1) Chicago Bulls vs. (3) Indiana Pacers ====
NBC

May 17
3:30 PM

Boxscore

Indiana Pacers 79, Chicago Bulls 85
Scoring by quarter: 22–16, 18–21, 17–27, 22–21
Pts: Reggie Miller 16; Rebs: Antonio Davis 11; Asts: Mark Jackson 6	Pts: Michael Jordan 31; Rebs: Dennis Rodman 10; Asts: Scottie Pippen 7
Chicago leads series, 1–0

United Center, Chicago, Illinois
Attendance: 23,844
Referees: Joe Crawford, Jack Nies, Tommy Nunez Sr.

TNT

May 19
8:30 PM

Boxscore

Indiana Pacers 98, Chicago Bulls 104
Scoring by quarter: 28–26, 24–19, 22–33, 24–26
Pts: Reggie Miller 19; Rebs: Dale Davis 9 Asts: Mark Jackson 8	Pts: Michael Jordan 41; Rebs: Ron Harper 9 Asts: Jordan, Pippen 5 each
Chicago leads series, 2–0

United Center, Chicago, Illinois
Attendance: 23,844
Referees: Jim Clark, Joe Forte, Hue Hollins

NBC

May 23
3:30 PM

Boxscore

Chicago Bulls 105, Indiana Pacers 107
Scoring by quarter: 24–26, 32–26, 21–25, 28–30
Pts: Michael Jordan 30; Rebs: Dennis Rodman 12; Asts: Michael Jordan 7	Pts: Reggie Miller 28; Rebs: Antonio Davis 12; Asts: Rose, Jackson 6 each
Chicago leads series, 2–1

Market Square Arena, Indianapolis, Indiana
Attendance: 16,576
Referees: Dick Bavetta, Bernie Fryer, Ron Garretson

NBC

May 25
3:30 PM

Boxscore

Chicago Bulls 94, Indiana Pacers 96
Scoring by quarter: 27–24, 27–24, 23–21, 17–27
Pts: Michael Jordan 28; Rebs: Dennis Rodman 16; Asts: Scottie Pippen 10	Pts: Rik Smits 26; Rebs: Chris Mullin 9 Asts: Mark Jackson 7
Series tied, 2–2

Market Square Arena, Indianapolis, Indiana
Attendance: 16,560
Referees: Hugh Evans, Ronnie Nunn, Bill Oakes

Reggie Miller hits the game-winning 3 with 0.7 seconds left.

NBC

May 27
9:00 PM

Boxscore

Indiana Pacers 87, Chicago Bulls 106
Scoring by quarter: 16–29, 16–28, 24–30, 31–19
Pts: Reggie Miller 14; Rebs: Smits, Davis 7 each Asts: Mark Jackson 5	Pts: Michael Jordan 29; Rebs: Scottie Pippen 8 Asts: Kukoč, Pippen 7 each
Chicago leads series, 3–2

United Center, Chicago, Illinois
Attendance: 23,844
Referees: Bob Delaney, Steve Javie, Bennett Salvatore

NBC

May 29
9:00 PM

Boxscore

Chicago Bulls 89, Indiana Pacers 92
Scoring by quarter: 24–24, 22–25, 23–21, 20–22
Pts: Michael Jordan 35; Rebs: Dennis Rodman 12; Asts: three players 2 each	Pts: Rik Smits 25; Rebs: Dale Davis 8 Asts: three players 3 each
Series tied, 3–3

Market Square Arena, Indianapolis, Indiana
Attendance: 16,566
Referees: Dan Crawford, Joe Crawford, Hue Hollins

NBC

May 31
7:00 PM

Boxscore

Indiana Pacers 83, Chicago Bulls 88
Scoring by quarter: 27–19, 18–29, 20–21, 18–19
Pts: Reggie Miller 22; Rebs: Antonio Davis 10; Asts: Mark Jackson 6	Pts: Michael Jordan 28; Rebs: Scottie Pippen 12; Asts: Michael Jordan 8
Chicago wins series, 4–3

United Center, Chicago, Illinois
Attendance: 23,844
Referees: Dick Bavetta, Hugh Evans, Jack Nies

Regular-season series
Tied 2–2 in the regular-season series

November 28, 1997

Recap

Chicago Bulls 83, Indiana Pacers 94

Market Square Arena, Indianapolis

February 17, 1998

Recap

Indiana Pacers 97, Chicago Bulls 105

United Center, Chicago, Illinois

March 17, 1998

Recap

Chicago Bulls 90, Indiana Pacers 84

Market Square Arena, Indianapolis

April 13, 1998

Recap

Indiana Pacers 114, Chicago Bulls 105

United Center, Chicago, Illinois

This was the first playoff meeting between the Bulls and the Pacers.

=== Western Conference finals ===
==== (1) Utah Jazz vs. (3) Los Angeles Lakers ====
NBC

May 16
3:00 PM

Boxscore

Los Angeles Lakers 77, Utah Jazz 112
Scoring by quarter: 13–24, 22–37, 30–30, 12–21
Pts: Shaquille O'Neal 19; Rebs: Corie Blount 9 Asts: Nick Van Exel 3	Pts: Karl Malone 29; Rebs: Shandon Anderson 11; Asts: Stockton, Eisley 9 each
Utah leads series, 1–0

Delta Center, Salt Lake City, Utah
Attendance: 19,911
Referees: Hugh Evans, Bernie Fryer, Ronnie Nunn

TNT

May 18
8:30 PM

Boxscore

Los Angeles Lakers 95, Utah Jazz 99
Scoring by quarter: 29–24, 21–25, 21–21, 24–29
Pts: Shaquille O'Neal 31; Rebs: Corie Blount 10; Asts: Rick Fox 7	Pts: Karl Malone 33; Rebs: Malone, Russell 7 each Asts: John Stockton 6
Utah leads series, 2–0

Delta Center, Salt Lake City, Utah
Attendance: 19,911
Referees: Terry Durham, Steve Javie, Bill Oakes

TNT

May 22
10:30 PM

Boxscore

Utah Jazz 109, Los Angeles Lakers 98
Scoring by quarter: 21–20, 28–23, 25–28, 35–27
Pts: Karl Malone 26; Rebs: Karl Malone 10; Asts: John Stockton 8	Pts: Shaquille O'Neal 39; Rebs: Shaquille O'Neal 15; Asts: Nick Van Exel 7
Utah leads series, 3–0

Great Western Forum, Inglewood, California
Attendance: 17,505
Referees: Dan Crawford, Bob Delaney, Tommy Nunez Sr.

NBC

May 24
3:30 PM

Boxscore

Utah Jazz 96, Los Angeles Lakers 92
Scoring by quarter: 20–18, 27–20, 20–19, 29–35
Pts: Karl Malone 32; Rebs: Karl Malone 14; Asts: John Stockton 8	Pts: Shaquille O'Neal 38; Rebs: Robert Horry 8 Asts: Eddie Jones 6
Utah wins series, 4–0

Great Western Forum, Inglewood, California
Attendance: 17,505
Referees: Joe Crawford, Jack Nies, Bennett Salvatore

Regular-season series
Los Angeles won 3–1 in the regular-season series

October 31, 1997

Recap

Utah Jazz 87, Los Angeles Lakers 104

Great Western Forum, Inglewood, California

November 18, 1997

Recap

Los Angeles Lakers 97, Utah Jazz 92

Delta Center, Salt Lake City

March 28, 1998

Recap

Los Angeles Lakers 91, Utah Jazz 106

Delta Center, Salt Lake City

April 19, 1998

Recap

Utah Jazz 98, Los Angeles Lakers 102

Great Western Forum, Inglewood, California

This was the third playoff meeting between these two teams, with each team winning one series apiece.

Previous playoff series
Tied 1–1 in all-time playoff series

1988

Los Angeles Lakers 4, Utah Jazz 3

1988 Western Conference Semifinals

1997

Los Angeles Lakers 1, Utah Jazz 4

1997 Western Conference Semifinals

== NBA Finals: (E1) Chicago Bulls vs. (W1) Utah Jazz ==
NBC

June 3
9:00 PM

Boxscore

Chicago Bulls 85, Utah Jazz 88 (OT)
Scoring by quarter: 17–17, 23–28, 19–22, 20–12, Overtime: 6–9
Pts: Michael Jordan 33; Rebs: Dennis Rodman 10; Asts: Steve Kerr 5	Pts: John Stockton 24; Rebs: Karl Malone 14; Asts: John Stockton 8
Utah leads series, 1–0

Delta Center, Salt Lake City, Utah
Attendance: 19,911
Referees: Ron Garretson, Steve Javie, Bennett Salvatore

Luc Longley hits the game-tying shot with 14.3 seconds left to force OT.

NBC

June 5
9:00 PM

Boxscore

Chicago Bulls 93, Utah Jazz 88
Scoring by quarter: 23–20, 27–26, 20–27, 23–15
Pts: Michael Jordan 37; Rebs: Kukoč, Rodman 9 each Asts: Scottie Pippen 4	Pts: Jeff Hornacek 20; Rebs: Karl Malone 12; Asts: Eisley, Stockton 7 each
Series tied, 1–1

Delta Center, Salt Lake City, Utah
Attendance: 19,911
Referees: Dan Crawford, Joe Crawford, Bill Oakes

NBC

June 7
8:30 PM

Boxscore

Utah Jazz 54, Chicago Bulls 96
Scoring by quarter: 14–17, 17–32, 14–23, 9–24
Pts: Karl Malone 22; Rebs: Greg Ostertag 9 Asts: John Stockton 7	Pts: Michael Jordan 24; Rebs: Ron Harper 10; Asts: Ron Harper 7
Chicago leads series, 2–1

United Center, Chicago, Illinois
Attendance: 23,844
Referees: Dick Bavetta, Hue Hollins, Ronnie Nunn

Utah scores the fewest points in any playoff game in NBA history (54) and loses by the biggest margin in NBA Finals history (42).

NBC

June 10
8:30 PM

Boxscore

Utah Jazz 82, Chicago Bulls 86
Scoring by quarter: 19–21, 18–18, 20–22, 25–25
Pts: Karl Malone 21; Rebs: Karl Malone 14; Asts: John Stockton 13	Pts: Michael Jordan 34; Rebs: Dennis Rodman 14; Asts: Scottie Pippen 5
Chicago leads series, 3–1

United Center, Chicago, Illinois
Attendance: 23,844
Referees: Hugh Evans, Steve Javie, Jack Nies

NBC

June 12
8:30 PM

Boxscore

Utah Jazz 83, Chicago Bulls 81
Scoring by quarter: 16–18, 14–18, 29–19, 24–26
Pts: Karl Malone 39; Rebs: Karl Malone 9 Asts: John Stockton 12	Pts: Toni Kukoč 30; Rebs: Scottie Pippen 11; Asts: Scottie Pippen 11
Chicago leads series, 3–2

United Center, Chicago, Illinois
Attendance: 23,844
Referees: Joe Crawford, Bill Oakes, Bennett Salvatore

NBC

June 14
9:00 PM

Boxscore

Chicago Bulls 87, Utah Jazz 86
Scoring by quarter: 22–25, 23–24, 16–17, 26–20
Pts: Michael Jordan 45; Rebs: Dennis Rodman 8 Asts: Kukoč, Pippen 4 each	Pts: Karl Malone 31; Rebs: Karl Malone 11; Asts: Karl Malone 7
Chicago wins series, 4–2

Delta Center, Salt Lake City, Utah
Attendance: 19,911
Referees: Dick Bavetta, Dan Crawford, Hue Hollins

Michael Jordan hits the game-winning shot with 5.2 seconds left; this was Jordan's final NBA game with the Bulls.

Regular-season series
Utah won 2–0 in the regular-season series

January 25, 1998

Recap

Utah Jazz 101, Chicago Bulls 94

United Center, Chicago, Illinois

February 4, 1998

Recap

Chicago Bulls 93, Utah Jazz 101

Delta Center, Salt Lake City

This was the second NBA Finals meeting between these two teams, with the Bulls winning the first meeting.

Previous playoff series
Chicago leads 1–0 in all-time playoff series

1997

Chicago Bulls 4, Utah Jazz 2

1997 NBA Finals

== Statistical leaders ==
Category	Game high			Average			
Category	Player	Team	High	Player	Team	Avg.	GP
Points	Michael Jordan	Chicago Bulls	45	Michael Jordan	Chicago Bulls	32.4	21
Rebounds	Dennis Rodman; David Robinson; Jayson Williams	Chicago Bulls; San Antonio Spurs; New Jersey Nets	21	David Robinson	San Antonio Spurs	14.1	9
Assists	Mark Jackson	Indiana Pacers	17	Damon Stoudamire	Portland Trail Blazers	9.5	4
Steals	Charlie Ward; Jason Kidd	New York Knicks; Phoenix Suns	6	Jason Kidd	Phoenix Suns	4.0	4
Blocks	Shaquille O'Neal	Los Angeles Lakers	8	David Robinson	San Antonio Spurs	3.3	9
