= Ed Gray =

American basketball player (born 1975)

Personal information
- Born: September 27, 1975 (age 51) Riverside, California, U.S.
- Listed height: 6 ft 3 in (1.91 m)
- Listed weight: 210 lb (95 kg)

Career information
- High school: John W. North (Riverside, California)
- College: Tennessee (1993–1994); College of Southern Idaho (1994–1995); California (1995–1997)
- NBA draft: 1997: 1st round, 22nd overall pick
- Drafted by: Atlanta Hawks
- Playing career: 1997–2002
- Position: Shooting guard
- Number: 22

Career history
- 1997–1999: Atlanta Hawks
- 2000–2001: Gary Steelheads
- 2001–2002: Dakota Wizards

Career highlights
- Third-team All-American – AP, NABC (1997); Pac-10 Player of the Year (1997); First-team All-Pac-10 (1997)
- Stats at NBA.com
- Stats at Basketball Reference

Edward Gray (born September 27, 1975) is an American former professional basketball player who was selected by the Atlanta Hawks in the first round (22nd overall pick) of the 1997 NBA draft.

Gray began his college career at the University of Tennessee, spent his sophomore year at the College of Southern Idaho (a junior college) and eventually transferred to the University of California, Berkeley. He was awarded the 1997 Pac-10 Player of the Year during his senior season at Cal averaging 24.8 ppg.

Gray's rookie season with the Hawks was marred by injuries, as well as suspensions for missing medical appointments. In March 1999, he was arrested for DUI and drug possession.

During the 1999 offseason, he was traded to the Portland Trail Blazers along with Steve Smith in exchange for Jim Jackson and Isaiah Rider. He was traded two months later to the Houston Rockets in a trade that sent Scottie Pippen to the Trail Blazers. He never had a chance to play for either team.

Gray ended his NBA career averaging 6.2 points, 1.2 rebounds and 0.8 assists in 60 games with the Hawks.
