= Chris Crawford (basketball, born 1975) =

American basketball player

Personal information
- Born: May 13, 1975 (age 51) Kalamazoo, Michigan, U.S.
- Listed height: 6 ft 9 in (2.06 m)
- Listed weight: 235 lb (107 kg)

Career information
- High school: Comstock (Kalamazoo, Michigan)
- College: Marquette (1993–1997)
- NBA draft: 1997: 2nd round, 50th overall pick
- Drafted by: Atlanta Hawks
- Playing career: 1997–2005
- Position: Power forward / small forward
- Number: 4

Career history
- 1997–2005: Atlanta Hawks

Career NBA statistics
- Points: 1,654 (6.6 ppg)
- Rebounds: 547 (2.2 rpg)
- Assists: 154 (0.6 apg)
- Stats at NBA.com
- Stats at Basketball Reference

Christopher Lee Crawford (born May 13, 1975) is an American former professional basketball player who was selected by the Atlanta Hawks in the second round (50th pick overall) of the 1997 NBA draft. A 6'9" forward from Marquette University, Crawford played in 7 NBA seasons, all with the Hawks. His best year was in the 2003–04 season where he averaged a career high 10.2 points per game. After his stint with Atlanta, in which he missed the entire 2004–05 season because of a torn ligament in his right knee, Crawford was released, and had a tryout with the New Jersey Nets, but did not ever play for them.

In his NBA career, Crawford played in 252 games and scored a total of 1,654 points.
