= 1998–99 Dallas Mavericks season =

NBA professional basketball team season

- Head coach: Don Nelson
- General manager: Don Nelson
- Owner: Ross Perot Jr.
- Arena: Reunion Arena

Results
- Record: 19–31 (.380)
- Place: Division: 5th (Midwest); Conference: 11th (Western)
- Playoff finish: Did not qualify
- Stats at Basketball Reference

Local media
- Television: KXTX-TV; Fox Sports Southwest (Jim Durham, Bob Ortegel)
- Radio: WBAP (Allen Stone)

The 1998–99 Dallas Mavericks season was the 19th season for the Dallas Mavericks in the National Basketball Association. Due to a lockout, the regular season began on February 5, 1999, and was cut from 82 games to 50.

== Season summary ==
=== Off-season ===
The Mavericks received the sixth overall pick in the 1998 NBA draft, and selected power forward Robert Traylor from the University of Michigan; however, the team soon traded Traylor to the Milwaukee Bucks in exchange for their top draft pick, rookie power forward and German basketball star Dirk Nowitzki on draft day. During the off-season, the team acquired Steve Nash from the Phoenix Suns also on draft day, signed free agents Gary Trent, and Hot Rod Williams.

=== Regular season ===
Despite the addition of Trent, Nowitzki and Nash, the Mavericks continued to struggle losing eight of their first nine games of the regular season, which included a seven-game losing streak in February. After 13 games, Cedric Ceballos suffered a wrist injury and was out for the remainder of the season, while Khalid Reeves was released to free agency, and later on signed with the Detroit Pistons. The Mavericks finished in fifth place in the Midwest Division with a 19–31 record, missing the NBA playoffs for the ninth consecutive year.

Michael Finley averaged 20.2 points, 5.3 rebounds, 4.4 assists and 1.3 steals per game, while Trent averaged 16.0 points and 7.8 rebounds per game, and Ceballos provided the team with 12.5 points per game. In addition, Hubert Davis contributed 9.1 points per game and led the Mavericks with 65 three-point field goals, while Shawn Bradley averaged 8.6 points, 8.0 rebounds and 3.2 blocks per game, Robert Pack averaged 8.9 points and 3.2 assists per game in only just 25 games due to injury, Nowitzki provided with 8.2 points and 3.4 rebounds per game, and Nash contributed 7.9 points and 5.5 assists per game. Meanwhile, Erick Strickland contributed 7.5 points per game, Samaki Walker averaged 5.9 points and 3.7 rebounds per game, and A.C. Green provided with 4.9 points and 4.6 rebounds per game. Trent also finished in third place in Most Improved Player voting.

The Mavericks finished 24th in the NBA in home-game attendance, with an attendance of 362,837 at the Reunion Arena during the regular season.

=== Aftermath ===
Following the season, Green was traded back to his former team, the Los Angeles Lakers, while Walker signed as a free agent with the San Antonio Spurs, and second-year center Chris Anstey was traded to the Chicago Bulls.

== Offseason ==
=== Draft picks ===
Round	Pick	Player	Position	Nationality	College
1	6	Robert Traylor	PF/C	United States	Michigan
2	30	Ansu Sesay	SF	United States	Mississippi
2	35	Bruno Šundov	C	Croatia	
2	53	Greg Buckner	SG	United States	Clemson

Robert Traylor was traded to the Milwaukee Bucks for Pat Garrity and Dirk Nowitzki.

== Roster ==
1998–99 Dallas Mavericks roster
Players

Pos.	No.	Player	Height	Weight	DOB	From
C	11	Chris Anstey	7 ft 0 in (2.13 m)	249 lb (113 kg)	1975–01–01	Australia
C	44	Shawn Bradley	7 ft 6 in (2.29 m)	235 lb (107 kg)	1972–03–22	BYU
G/F	23	Cedric Ceballos (injured)	6 ft 6 in (1.98 m)	190 lb (86 kg)	1969–08–02	Cal State Fullerton
G	24	Hubert Davis	6 ft 5 in (1.96 m)	183 lb (83 kg)	1970–05–17	North Carolina
G/F	4	Michael Finley	6 ft 7 in (2.01 m)	215 lb (98 kg)	1973–03–06	Wisconsin
F	45	A.C. Green	6 ft 9 in (2.06 m)	220 lb (100 kg)	1963–10–04	Oregon State
G	13	Steve Nash	6 ft 3 in (1.91 m)	195 lb (88 kg)	1974–02–07	Santa Clara
F/C	41	Dirk Nowitzki	7 ft 0 in (2.13 m)	237 lb (108 kg)	1978–06–19	Germany
G	14	Robert Pack (injured)	6 ft 2 in (1.88 m)	180 lb (82 kg)	1969–02–03	USC
F	5	Ansu Sesay (injured) (IN)	6 ft 9 in (2.06 m)	225 lb (102 kg)	1976–07–29	Mississippi
G	20	Erick Strickland	6 ft 3 in (1.91 m)	210 lb (95 kg)	1973–11–25	Nebraska
C	40	Bruno Šundov	7 ft 2 in (2.18 m)	220 lb (100 kg)	1980–02–10	The Winchendon School (HS)
F	33	Gary Trent	6 ft 8 in (2.03 m)	250 lb (113 kg)	1974–09–22	Ohio
F/C	52	Samaki Walker	6 ft 9 in (2.06 m)	240 lb (109 kg)	1976–02–25	Louisville
C	18	Hot Rod Williams	6 ft 11 in (2.11 m)	215 lb (98 kg)	1962–08–09	Tulane

Coaches
Head coach
- Don Nelson
Assistant(s)
- Donnie Nelson
- Charlie Parker
- Scott Roth

Legend
- (DP) Unsigned draft pick
- (FA) Free agent
- (S) Suspended
- (IN) Inactive
- Injured

Roster

=== Roster notes ===
- Center Shawn Bradley holds both American and German citizenship.
- Rookie small forward Ansu Sesay was on the injured reserve list due to a broken right foot, missed the entire regular season, and never played for the Mavericks.

== Regular season ==
=== Season standings ===
Midwest Division	W	L	PCT	GB	Home	Road	Div
y-San Antonio Spurs	37	13	.740	–	21–4	16–9	17–4
x-Utah Jazz	37	13	.740	–	22–3	15–10	15–3
x-Houston Rockets	31	19	.620	6	19–6	12–13	12–9
x-Minnesota Timberwolves	25	25	.500	12	18–7	7–18	11–9
Dallas Mavericks	19	31	.380	18	15–10	4–21	8–12
Denver Nuggets	14	36	.280	23	12–13	2–23	5–16
Vancouver Grizzlies	8	42	.160	29	7–18	1–24	3–18

#	Western Conference				
#	Team	W	L	PCT	GB
1	z-San Antonio Spurs	37	13	.740	–
2	y-Portland Trail Blazers	35	15	.700	2
3	x-Utah Jazz	37	13	.740	–
4	x-Los Angeles Lakers	31	19	.620	6
5	x-Houston Rockets	31	19	.620	6
6	x-Sacramento Kings	27	23	.540	10
7	x-Phoenix Suns	27	23	.540	10
8	x-Minnesota Timberwolves	25	25	.500	12
9	Seattle SuperSonics	25	25	.500	12
10	Golden State Warriors	21	29	.420	16
11	Dallas Mavericks	19	31	.380	18
12	Denver Nuggets	14	36	.280	23
13	Los Angeles Clippers	9	41	.180	28
14	Vancouver Grizzlies	8	42	.160	29

z - clinched division title
y - clinched division title
x - clinched playoff spot

=== Game log ===
1998–99 game log
Total: 19–31 (Home: 15–10; Road: 4–21)
February: 5–10 (home: 3–2; road: 2–8)

Game	Date	Team	Score	High points	High rebounds	High assists	Location Attendance	Record
1	February 5	@ Seattle	L 86–92 (OT)	Cedric Ceballos (16)	A.C. Green (11)	Nash, Finley (5)	KeyArena; 17,072	0–1
2	February 7	@ Golden State	W 102–99 (2OT)	Cedric Ceballos (26)	Dirk Nowitzki (12)	Steve Nash (12)	The Arena in Oakland; 12,039	1–1
3	February 9	Utah	L 79–90	Cedric Ceballos (19)	Dirk Nowitzki (9)	Steve Nash (4)	Reunion Arena; 17,070	1–2
4	February 11	Houston	L 95–105	Robert Pack (31)	Shawn Bradley (8)	Michael Finley (4)	Reunion Arena; 18,121	1–3
5	February 12	@ Denver	L 94–100	Michael Finley (28)	A.C. Green (8)	Steve Nash (9)	McNichols Sports Arena; 10,012	1–4
6	February 14	@ Vancouver	L 92–96	Steve Nash (18)	Shawn Bradley (10)	Steve Nash (9)	General Motors Place; 16,059	1–5
7	February 15	@ Portland	L 84–99	Michael Finley (21)	Samaki Walker (6)	Steve Nash (4)	Rose Garden; 18,231	1–6
8	February 17	@ L.A. Lakers	L 88–101	Gary Trent (15)	Cedric Ceballos (8)	Robert Pack (7)	Great Western Forum; 13,492	1–7
9	February 19	@ Golden State	L 79–84	Michael Finley (19)	Shawn Bradley (11)	Finley, Nash (4)	The Arena in Oakland; 11,432	1–8
10	February 20	@ L.A. Clippers	W 105–90	Michael Finley (31)	Cedric Ceballos (11)	Steve Nash (6)	Los Angeles Memorial Sports Arena; 10,946	2–8
11	February 22	@ Phoenix	L 83–101	Cedric Ceballos (21)	Shawn Bradley (7)	Robert Pack (5)	America West Arena; 18,596	2–9
12	February 23	Atlanta	W 89–85	Michael Finley (22)	Gary Trent (10)	Robert Pack (8)	Reunion Arena; 13,387	3–9
13	February 25	Denver	W 90–81	Finley, Ceballos (20)	Cedric Ceballos (13)	Steve Nash (5)	Reunion Arena; 13,203	4–9
14	February 26	@ Utah	L 65–80	Robert Pack (18)	Samaki Walker (8)	Michael Finley (3)	Delta Center; 19,911	4–10
15	February 27	Sacramento	W 97–90	Gary Trent (29)	Gary Trent (16)	Robert Pack (6)	Reunion Arena; 15,009	5–10

March: 5–12 (home: 5–6; road: 0–6)

Game	Date	Team	Score	High points	High rebounds	High assists	Location Attendance	Record
16	March 2	L.A. Clippers	W 112–99	Michael Finley (20)	A.C. Green (12)	Michael Finley (9)	Reunion Arena; 13,492	6–10
17	March 4	San Antonio	L 79–95	Gary Trent (14)	Dirk Nowitzki (6)	Michael Finley (6)	Reunion Arena; 14,719	6–11
18	March 5	@ Utah	L 95–106	Michael Finley (29)	Finley, Trent (8)	Gary Trent (5)	Delta Center; 19,539	6–12
19	March 7	@ Sacramento	L 89–94	Trent, Finley (18)	Gary Trent (14)	Steve Nash (7)	ARCO Arena; 14,715	6–13
20	March 9	Phoenix	L 91–103	Michael Finley (22)	Shawn Bradley (14)	Michael Finley (12)	Reunion Arena; 12,714	6–14
21	March 11	Orlando	W 93–76	Gary Trent (21)	A.C. Green (11)	Steve Nash (11)	Reunion Arena; 14,553	7–14
22	March 13	Vancouver	W 91–74	Michael Finley (21)	Shawn Bradley (10)	Steve Nash (10)	Reunion Arena; 14,184	8–14
23	March 15	Portland	L 91–106	Michael Finley (21)	A.C. Green (8)	Michael Finley (6)	Reunion Arena; 14,046	8–15
24	March 17	@ New Jersey	L 87–88	Finley, Trent (21)	Gary Trent (16)	Finley, Nash (4)	Continental Airlines Arena; 14,976	8–16
25	March 19	@ Detroit	L 87–94	Michael Finley (18)	Finley, Strickland (6)	Michael Finley (8)	The Palace of Auburn Hills; 18,152	8–17
26	March 20	Sacramento	W 104–90	Nash, Finley, Trent (22)	Gary Trent (11)	Michael Finley (9)	Reunion Arena; 16,161	9–17
27	March 22	L.A. Lakers	L 93–96	Michael Finley (23)	A.C. Green (10)	Michael Finley (8)	Reunion Arena; 18,121	9–18
28	March 24	Houston	L 78–88	Shawn Bradley (20)	Shawn Bradley (13)	Michael Finley (8)	Reunion Arena; 15,111	9–19
29	March 26	Denver	W 98–79	Michael Finley (27)	Shawn Bradley (8)	Erick Strickland (4)	Reunion Arena; 13,096	10–19
30	March 27	@ San Antonio	L 77–99	Michael Finley (17)	Shawn Bradley (12)	Steve Nash (5)	Alamodome; 25,921	10–20
31	March 29	Seattle	L 101–109	Gary Trent (20)	Samaki Walker (13)	Erick Strickland (7)	Reunion Arena; 13,311	10–21
32	March 30	@ Minnesota	L 78–98	Gary Trent (16)	Gary Trent (11)	Steve Nash (10)	Target Center; 15,609	10–22

April: 8–7 (home: 6–2; road: 2–5)

Game	Date	Team	Score	High points	High rebounds	High assists	Location Attendance	Record
33	April 1	L.A. Clippers	W 93–84	Michael Finley (22)	Shawn Bradley (13)	Steve Nash (9)	Reunion Arena; 13,336	11–22
34	April 5	@ Minnesota	L 93–100	Gary Trent (26)	Gary Trent (8)	Steve Nash (7)	Target Center; 14,107	11–23
35	April 7	@ Miami	L 87–93	Gary Trent (27)	Gary Trent (13)	Steve Nash (5)	Miami Arena; 15,200	11–24
36	April 10	Golden State	L 90–91	Gary Trent (33)	Shawn Bradley (13)	Michael Finley (6)	Reunion Arena; 14,218	11–25
37	April 13	San Antonio	W 92–86	Michael Finley (25)	Shawn Bradley (12)	Steve Nash (12)	Reunion Arena; 13,142	12–25
38	April 15	Minnesota	W 101–95	Michael Finley (34)	Gary Trent (7)	Steve Nash (6)	Reunion Arena; 13,034	13–25
39	April 16	@ Phoenix	L 85–92	Dirk Nowitzki (29)	Dirk Nowitzki (8)	Robert Pack (7)	America West Arena; 18,623	13–26
40	April 17	Portland	L 94–102	Finley, Trent (24)	Gary Trent (10)	Michael Finley (5)	Reunion Arena; 13,358	13–27
41	April 20	Phoenix	W 104–100	Michael Finley (36)	Finley, Bradley (10)	Finley, Davis, Nowitzki (4)	Reunion Arena; 18,121	14–27
42	April 21	@ Houston	W 109–95	Michael Finley (27)	Trent, Bradley (10)	Michael Finley (11)	Compaq Center; 16,285	15–27
43	April 22	@ San Antonio	L 76–103	Michael Finley (20)	Chris Anstey (10)	Davis, Finley, Trent, Strickland (2)	Alamodome; 18,720	15–28
44	April 24	@ Sacramento	L 102–105	Gary Trent (32)	Gary Trent (14)	Michael Finley (8)	ARCO Arena; 17,317	15–29
45	April 26	Chicago	W 101–93	Michael Finley (28)	Shawn Bradley (17)	Davis, Trent (5)	Reunion Arena; 13,011	16–29
46	April 27	Vancouver	W 84–75	Gary Trent (20)	Shawn Bradley (12)	Finley, Trent (5)	Reunion Arena; 12,650	17–29
47	April 29	@ Houston	W 91–81	Finley, Nowitzki (22)	Shawn Bradley (11)	Hubert Davis (6)	Compaq Center; 16,285	18–29

May: 1–2 (home: 1–0; road: 0–2)

Game	Date	Team	Score	High points	High rebounds	High assists	Location Attendance	Record
48	May 1	Golden State	W 105–94	Michael Finley (31)	Shawn Bradley (15)	Davis, Strickland (6)	Reunion Arena; 15,669	19–29
49	May 3	@ L.A. Lakers	L 102–115	Michael Finley (24)	Chris Anstey (7)	Erick Strickland (6)	Great Western Forum; 17,505	19–30
50	May 4	@ Seattle	L 100–110	Michael Finley (34)	Shawn Bradley (15)	Michael Finley (6)	KeyArena; 17,072	19–31

1998–99 schedule

== Player statistics ==
=== Ragular season ===
Player	POS	GP	GS	MP	REB	AST	STL	BLK	PTS	MPG	RPG	APG	SPG	BPG	PPG
Michael Finley	SF	50	50	2,051	263	218	66	15	1,009	41.0	5.3	4.4	1.3	.3	20.2
A.C. Green	PF	50	35	924	228	25	28	8	246	18.5	4.6	.5	.6	.2	4.9
Hubert Davis	SG	50	21	1,378	86	89	21	3	457	27.6	1.7	1.8	.4	.1	9.1
Shawn Bradley	C	49	33	1,294	392	40	35	159	420	26.4	8.0	.8	.7	3.2	8.6
Dirk Nowitzki	PF	47	24	958	162	47	29	27	385	20.4	3.4	1.0	.6	.6	8.2
Gary Trent	PF	45	23	1,362	351	77	29	23	719	30.3	7.8	1.7	.6	.5	16.0
Chris Anstey	C	41	4	470	97	27	18	13	134	11.5	2.4	.7	.4	.3	3.3
Steve Nash	PG	40	40	1,269	114	219	37	2	315	31.7	2.9	5.5	.9	.1	7.9
Samaki Walker	PF	39	2	568	143	6	9	16	229	14.6	3.7	.2	.2	.4	5.9
Erick Strickland	SG	33	2	567	83	64	40	2	249	17.2	2.5	1.9	1.2	.1	7.5
John Williams	C	25	11	403	83	15	13	18	29	16.1	3.3	.6	.5	.7	1.2
Robert Pack	PG	25	0	468	36	81	20	1	222	18.7	1.4	3.2	.8	.0	8.9
Cedric Ceballos	SF	13	5	352	85	12	7	5	163	27.1	6.5	.9	.5	.4	12.5
Bruno Šundov	C	3	0	11	0	1	0	0	4	3.7	.0	.3	.0	.0	1.3

- ^{†} Denotes player spent time with another team in the season. Stats reflect time with the Mavericks only.

== See also ==
- 1998-99 NBA season
