= 1998–99 Vancouver Grizzlies season =

- Head coach: Brian Hill
- General manager: Stu Jackson
- Owners: John McCaw, Jr.
- Arena: General Motors Place

Results
- Record: 8–42 (.160)
- Place: Division: 7th (Midwest); Conference: 14th (Western)
- Playoff finish: Did not qualify
- Stats at Basketball Reference

Local media
- Television: CHEK-TV; CTV Sportsnet Pacific
- Radio: CKNW

The 1998–99 Vancouver Grizzlies season was the fourth season for the Vancouver Grizzlies in the National Basketball Association. Due to a lockout, the regular season began on February 5, 1999, and was cut from 82 games to 50.

== Season summary ==
=== Off-season ===
The Grizzlies received the second overall pick in the 1998 NBA draft, and selected point guard Mike Bibby from the University of Arizona; the team also acquired rookie shooting guard, and first-round draft pick Felipe López out of St. John's University from the San Antonio Spurs on draft day. During the off-season, the Grizzlies signed free agents Cherokee Parks, and second-year guard DeJuan Wheat.

=== Regular season ===
With the addition of Bibby, López and Parks, the Grizzlies had a 4–6 record in their first ten games of the regular season, but then struggled posting a 13-game losing streak between February and March afterwards, as Bryant Reeves only played just 25 games due to weight problems and a knee injury. At mid-season, the team traded three-point specialist Sam Mack back to his former team, the Houston Rockets in exchange for second-year guard Rodrick Rhodes; the team also signed Terry Dehere, who was previously released by the Sacramento Kings. The Grizzlies lost their final seven games of the season, returning to last place in the Midwest Division with a league-worst 8–42 record.

The Grizzlies' 8 wins marked the lowest amount of victories by a team in a season since the league's inception as the NBA; the 6 wins by the Providence Steamrollers in the 1947–48 season occurred back when the league was named the Basketball Association of America. The 2011–12 Charlotte Bobcats later on broke the Grizzlies' record by posting 7 wins in its own lockout-shortened season (66 games), and subsequently held the worst record in NBA history ever since.

Shareef Abdur-Rahim averaged 23.0 points, 7.5 rebounds and 1.4 steals per game, while Bibby averaged 13.2 points, 6.5 assists and 1.6 steals per game, and was named to the NBA All-Rookie First Team. In addition, Tony Massenburg provided the team with 11.2 points and 6.0 rebounds per game, while Reeves provided with 10.8 points and 5.5 rebounds per game, López contributed 9.3 points per game, and Parks averaged 5.5 points and 5.1 rebounds per game. Off the bench, Doug West contributed 5.8 points per game, but only played just 14 games due to injury, while Michael Smith averaged 4.8 points and 7.3 rebounds per game, Wheat provided with 4.5 points and 2.2 assists per game, and Pete Chilcutt contributed 3.6 points per game.

The Grizzlies finished 16th in the NBA in home-game attendance, with an attendance of 417,966 at General Motors Place during the regular season.

=== Aftermath ===
Following the season, Massenburg was traded to the Houston Rockets, while Smith, Rhodes, and Lee Mayberry were all traded to the Orlando Magic, who then released all three players to free agency, as Smith signed as a free agent with the Washington Wizards, and Dehere, Wheat and Chilcutt were all released.

== Draft picks ==
The Grizzlies' first draft pick was Mike Bibby, which was the second overall pick in the draft.

Round	Pick	Player	Position	Nationality	College
1	2	Mike Bibby	Guard	United States	University of Arizona
2	56	J.R. Henderson	Forward	United States	UCLA

== Roster ==
1998–99 Vancouver Grizzlies roster
Players

Pos.	No.	Player	Height	Weight	DOB	From
F	3	Shareef Abdur-Rahim	6 ft 9 in (2.06 m)	225 lb (102 kg)	––	California
G	10	Mike Bibby	6 ft 2 in (1.88 m)	195 lb (88 kg)	––	Arizona
F/C	32	Pete Chilcutt	6 ft 10 in (2.08 m)	230 lb (104 kg)	––	North Carolina
G	24	Terry Dehere	6 ft 2 in (1.88 m)	190 lb (86 kg)	––	Seton Hall
F	52	J.R. Henderson	6 ft 8 in (2.03 m)	226 lb (103 kg)	––	UCLA
G	13	Felipe López	6 ft 5 in (1.96 m)	215 lb (98 kg)	––	St. John's
F/C	44	Tony Massenburg	6 ft 9 in (2.06 m)	220 lb (100 kg)	––	Maryland
G	11	Lee Mayberry (injured)	6 ft 1 in (1.85 m)	172 lb (78 kg)	––	Arkansas
F	40	Makhtar N'Diaye	6 ft 8 in (2.03 m)	245 lb (111 kg)	––	North Carolina
F/C	1	Cherokee Parks	6 ft 11 in (2.11 m)	235 lb (107 kg)	––	Duke
C	50	Bryant Reeves	7 ft 0 in (2.13 m)	290 lb (132 kg)	––	Oklahoma State
G/F	12	Rodrick Rhodes	6 ft 6 in (1.98 m)	225 lb (102 kg)	––	USC
F	34	Michael Smith	6 ft 8 in (2.03 m)	230 lb (104 kg)	––	Providence
G	2	Doug West (injured)	6 ft 6 in (1.98 m)	200 lb (91 kg)	––	Villanova
G	6	DeJuan Wheat	6 ft 0 in (1.83 m)	165 lb (75 kg)	––	Louisville

Coaches
Head coach
- Brian Hill
Assistant(s)
- Jim Boylan
- Lionel Hollins
- Jack Nolan

Legend
- (DP) Unsigned draft pick
- (FA) Free agent
- (S) Suspended
- Injured

Roster

=== Roster Notes ===
- Rookie power forward J. R. Henderson holds Japanese and American dual citizenship; he was born in the United States, but played for the Japan national team.

== Regular season ==
Due to the 1998–99 NBA lockout, the NBA would see a shortened schedule for the 1998–99 season, as every team would play 50 games, compared to 82 in a normal season. The Grizzlies began the season with their best start in franchise history, as they had a 3–3 record in their first six games, the latest in a season that the club had a .500 record. Vancouver would fall into a bad streak soon afterward, though, losing sixteen of their next seventeen games, which included a thirteen-game losing streak, to fall out of the playoff picture entirely in a fast pace. Wins would be few and far between for the remainder of the season, as the Grizzlies ended the year with a record of 8–42, which represented a .160 winning percentage, their lowest in team history. Vancouver finished with the worst record in the league for the third time in four seasons.

At the time, the Grizzlies finished with the second-lowest win total for a season in NBA history behind the Providence Steamrollers winning only six games during the 1947–48 BAA season. Since then, only the 2011–12 Charlotte Bobcats have provided a worst win total (and worst overall record in NBA history) for a season (which coincidentally also occurred during a lockout-shortened season) than this season's Vancouver Grizzlies team.

=== Highs ===
- On February 16, 1999, Vancouver defeated the Los Angeles Clippers 93–89 in double overtime, to even their record to 3-3, the latest they had ever been .500 in a season. This subsequently became their only road win of the season.
- On February 23, 1999, Shareef Abdur-Rahim led the Grizzlies with 28 points, stunning the Los Angeles Lakers with a 93–83 victory, recording their first ever victory against the Lakers.
- Notably, the Grizzlies secured victories over the Los Angeles Clippers on February 10, 1999, the aforementioned February 16, 1999 double-overtime game, and on April 21, 1999. This marked the only head-to-head series of the season where the Grizzlies won that season, let alone had more than one win in, which prevented them from attaining the dubious distinction of the lowest win total in a season.

=== Lows ===
- On February 21, 1999, the Grizzlies lost to their expansion cousins, the Toronto Raptors, 102–87 in the first game played at the Raptors' new arena, the Air Canada Centre.
- On March 16, 1999, Vancouver lost 87–85 to the Seattle SuperSonics, extending their losing streak to a season-high thirteen games.
- On May 5, 1999, the Grizzlies lost to the Sacramento Kings 99–95, cementing their status as one of the worst teams in NBA history by only winning 8 games in a single season.

=== Season standings ===
Midwest Division	W	L	PCT	GB	Home	Road	Div
y-San Antonio Spurs	37	13	.740	–	21–4	16–9	17–4
x-Utah Jazz	37	13	.740	–	22–3	15–10	15–3
x-Houston Rockets	31	19	.620	6	19–6	12–13	12–9
x-Minnesota Timberwolves	25	25	.500	12	18–7	7–18	11–9
Dallas Mavericks	19	31	.380	18	15–10	4–21	8–12
Denver Nuggets	14	36	.280	23	12–13	2–23	5–16
Vancouver Grizzlies	8	42	.160	29	7–18	1–24	3–18

#	Western Conference				
#	Team	W	L	PCT	GB
1	z-San Antonio Spurs	37	13	.740	–
2	y-Portland Trail Blazers	35	15	.700	2
3	x-Utah Jazz	37	13	.740	–
4	x-Los Angeles Lakers	31	19	.620	6
5	x-Houston Rockets	31	19	.620	6
6	x-Sacramento Kings	27	23	.540	10
7	x-Phoenix Suns	27	23	.540	10
8	x-Minnesota Timberwolves	25	25	.500	12
9	Seattle SuperSonics	25	25	.500	12
10	Golden State Warriors	21	29	.420	16
11	Dallas Mavericks	19	31	.380	18
12	Denver Nuggets	14	36	.280	23
13	Los Angeles Clippers	9	41	.180	28
14	Vancouver Grizzlies	8	42	.160	29

=== Game log ===
#	Date	Opponent	Score	Record	Attendance
1	February 7	@ Sacramento Kings	87-109	0-1	17,317
2	February 8	Portland Trail Blazers	76-95	0-2	18,353
3	February 10	Los Angeles Clippers	105-99	1-2	14,818
4	February 11	Indiana Pacers	97-101	1-3	14,914
5	February 14	Dallas Mavericks	96-92	2-3	16,059
6	February 16	@ Los Angeles Clippers	93-89 (2OT)	3-3	9,626
7	February 17	Boston Celtics	129-131 (3OT)	3-4	13,041
8	February 19	@ Minnesota Timberwolves	96-115	3-5	17,907
9	February 21	@ Toronto Raptors	87-102	3-6	19,800
10	February 23	Los Angeles Lakers	93-83	4-6	19,193
11	February 25	Phoenix Suns	86-94	4-7	13,494
12	February 27	Houston Rockets	74-86	4-8	19,193
13	February 28	@ Denver Nuggets	112-116	4-9	9,248
14	March 2	Sacramento Kings	101-111	4-10	13,252
15	March 3	@ Utah Jazz	86-109	4-11	18,556
16	March 4	Minnesota Timberwolves	93-102	4-12	13,329
17	March 6	Houston Rockets	92-107	4-13	19,193
18	March 8	Portland Trail Blazers	73-92	4-14	13,552
19	March 9	@ Golden State Warriors	82-92	4-15	10,043
20	March 11	@ Houston Rockets	91-102	4-16	16,285
21	March 13	@ Dallas Mavericks	74-91	4-17	14,184
22	March 15	@ Denver Nuggets	84-110	4-18	8,251
23	March 16	@ Seattle SuperSonics	85-87	4-19	17,072
24	March 18	Minnesota Timberwolves	86-81	5-19	17,466
25	March 20	San Antonio Spurs	88-92	5-20	19,193
26	March 22	@ Phoenix Suns	84-89	5-21	18,855
27	March 24	Philadelphia 76ers	90-95 (OT)	5-22	16,615
28	March 26	Utah Jazz	80-85	5-23	19,193
29	March 29	@ Los Angeles Lakers	98-116	5-24	17,312
30	March 30	Denver Nuggets	101-87	6-24	15,018
31	April 1	@ San Antonio Spurs	91-103	6-25	16,384
32	April 2	@ Atlanta Hawks	81-84	6-26	8,748
33	April 4	@ Chicago Bulls	87-88	6-27	22,198
34	April 6	@ Portland Trail Blazers	89-98	6-28	18,105
35	April 7	Denver Nuggets	84-87	6-29	17,151
36	April 9	Seattle SuperSonics	98-93	7-29	19,193
37	April 11	Sacramento Kings	88-91	7-30	17,167
38	April 12	@ Utah Jazz	80-98	7-31	19,911
39	April 14	@ Houston Rockets	85-102	7-32	16,285
40	April 16	@ Minnesota Timberwolves	75-89	7-33	18,347
41	April 18	Golden State Warriors	85-90	7-34	17,063
42	April 19	@ Los Angeles Lakers	102-117	7-35	17,505
43	April 21	Los Angeles Clippers	97-94	8-35	15,885
44	April 23	Seattle SuperSonics	84-97	8-36	19,193
45	April 24	@ Los Angeles Clippers	96-105	8-37	13,493
46	April 27	@ Dallas Mavericks	75-84	8-38	12,650
47	April 29	San Antonio Spurs	72-99	8-39	18,848
48	May 1	@ Phoenix Suns	77-107	8-40	19,023
49	May 3	Golden State Warriors	83-91	8-41	17,990
50	May 5	@ Sacramento Kings	95-99	8-42	17,317

Schedule and results citation:

== Player statistics ==
=== Regular season ===
Player	POS	GP	GS	MP	REB	AST	STL	BLK	PTS	MPG	RPG	APG	SPG	BPG	PPG
Shareef Abdur-Rahim	SF	50	50	2,021	374	172	69	55	1,152	40.4	7.5	3.4	1.4	1.1	23.0
Mike Bibby	PG	50	50	1,758	136	325	78	5	662	35.2	2.7	6.5	1.6	.1	13.2
Cherokee Parks	C	48	41	1,118	243	36	28	28	266	23.3	5.1	.8	.6	.6	5.5
Michael Smith	PF	48	10	1,098	350	48	46	18	230	22.9	7.3	1.0	1.0	.4	4.8
Felipe López	SG	47	32	1,218	166	62	49	14	437	25.9	3.5	1.3	1.0	.3	9.3
Pete Chilcutt	PF	46	0	697	117	30	22	12	166	15.2	2.5	.7	.5	.3	3.6
DeJuan Wheat	PG	46	0	590	45	102	26	2	208	12.8	1.0	2.2	.6	.0	4.5
Tony Massenburg	PF	43	35	1,143	257	23	26	39	481	26.6	6.0	.5	.6	.9	11.2
J. R. Sakuragi	SF	30	0	331	47	22	9	4	97	11.0	1.6	.7	.3	.1	3.2
Bryant Reeves	C	25	14	702	138	37	13	8	271	28.1	5.5	1.5	.5	.3	10.8
Terry Dehere^{†}	SG	22	0	271	22	26	5	3	74	12.3	1.0	1.2	.2	.1	3.4
Sam Mack^{†}	SF	19	15	577	53	23	20	1	242	30.4	2.8	1.2	1.1	.1	12.7
Doug West	SG	14	2	294	25	19	16	7	81	21.0	1.8	1.4	1.1	.5	5.8
Rodrick Rhodes^{†}	SG	10	1	123	13	10	4	2	34	12.3	1.3	1.0	.4	.2	3.4
Lee Mayberry	PG	9	0	126	3	23	7	0	20	14.0	.3	2.6	.8	.0	2.2
Jason Sasser	SF	6	0	39	7	2	2	0	11	6.5	1.2	.3	.3	.0	1.8
Carl Herrera^{†}	PF	4	0	42	8	3	0	0	6	10.5	2.0	.8	.0	.0	1.5
Makhtar N'Diaye	PF	4	0	27	5	1	0	1	5	6.8	1.3	.3	.0	.3	1.3

- ^{†} Denotes player spent time with another team in the season. Stats reflect time with the Grizzlies only.

== Awards and records ==
- Mike Bibby, NBA All-Rookie Team First Team

== Transactions ==
The Grizzlies signed free agent Cherokee Parks, who spent the 1997–98 season with the Minnesota Timberwolves. Parks averaged 7.1 points in 79 games with Minnesota last season.

The San Antonio Spurs and Grizzlies made a trade, with Vancouver sending Antonio Daniels to the Spurs for Felipe López and Carl Herrera. Lopez was the Spurs' first round draft pick in the 1998 NBA draft.
