= Terrell Brandon =

American basketball player (born 1970)

Personal information
- Born: May 20, 1970 (age 56) Portland, Oregon, U.S.
- Listed height: 5 ft 11 in (1.80 m)
- Listed weight: 173 lb (78 kg)

Career information
- High school: Grant (Portland, Oregon)
- College: Oregon (1989–1991)
- NBA draft: 1991: 1st round, 11th overall pick
- Drafted by: Cleveland Cavaliers
- Playing career: 1991–2002
- Position: Point guard
- Number: 11, 1, 7

Career history
- 1991–1997: Cleveland Cavaliers
- 1997–1999: Milwaukee Bucks
- 1999–2002: Minnesota Timberwolves

Career highlights
- 2× NBA All-Star (1996, 1997); NBA All-Rookie Second Team (1992); Pac-10 Player of the Year (1991); 2× First-team All-Pac-10 (1990, 1991)

Career statistics
- Points: 9,994 (13.8 ppg)
- Rebounds: 2,174 (3.0 rpg)
- Assists: 4,407 (6.1 apg)
- Stats at NBA.com
- Stats at Basketball Reference

Thomas Terrell Brandon (born May 20, 1970) is an American former professional basketball player. He played for three teams during his 11-year career in the National Basketball Association (NBA). A two-time All-Star, Brandon was a key starter on three NBA franchises before a series of injuries ultimately forced him to play his last game at 31 years old.

== Early life and education ==
Brandon was born in Portland, Oregon and attended Grant High School, where he led his team to the 1988 Class AAA Oregon high-school basketball championship, being named Oregon high school player of the year. As a child, he suffered from chronic foot deformation.

== College career ==
Brandon attended the University of Oregon, leading his team to the National Invitational Tournament (NIT) in 1989–90 as a sophomore. He then went on to hold several school records: career- and single-season scoring average, assists in a single game (13), single-season steals (twice), and single-game steals (eight). Brandon earned team MVP honors in 1990 and 1991. After being an honorable mention All-American, he became the first Oregon player to leave school early for the NBA.

== NBA career ==
=== Cleveland Cavaliers (1991–1997) ===
Brandon was selected 11th overall in the 1991 NBA draft by the Cleveland Cavaliers. After a strong rookie season, Brandon was named to the NBA All-Rookie Team. He spent his first three and a half seasons as the backup to All–Star point guard Mark Price. On December 21, 1993, Brandon scored 18 points and recorded 14 assists coming off the bench in a win over the Utah Jazz. Filling in for an injured Price during the 1994–95 season, Brandon responded by leading Cleveland on an 11–game winning streak. After the season, Cleveland traded Price to Washington. On February 15, 1995, Brandon scored 31 points on 12–15 shooting from the field, alongside recording 8 assists and 4 rebounds, in a 100–99 win against the Orlando Magic.

As Cleveland's starting point guard, Brandon earned consecutive All-Star Game appearances in 1996 and 1997, the second of which Cleveland hosted. Between these selections, on December 22, 1996, Brandon scored 33 points, recorded nine assists, grabbed six rebounds, and stole the ball four times in a 100–94 win over the Utah Jazz, which was notable as he was primarily guarded by all-time great John Stockton. Sports Illustrated labeled him "The Best Point Guard in the NBA" in a 1997 issue, the year he led the Cavaliers in points, assists and steals. He was also awarded the NBA Sportsmanship Award in 1997, for his work with underprivileged youth.

=== Milwaukee Bucks (1997–1999) ===
In September 1997, Cleveland traded Brandon to the Milwaukee Bucks. In the trade, Cleveland also sent Tyrone Hill and a top 10 protected draft pick to the Bucks; Milwaukee sent Sherman Douglas to Cleveland and Vin Baker to the Seattle SuperSonics, who dealt Shawn Kemp to Cleveland. Though Cleveland was not looking to trade Brandon, the team felt they could not pass over the opportunity to trade for a superstar of Kemp's caliber. On December 7, 1997, Brandon scored 20 points, recorded 13 assists, and grabbed seven rebounds in a 97–91 win over the SuperSonics. On January 5, 1998, Brandon again helped lead the Bucks to a victory, scoring 16 points and recording 15 assists in a 98–92 win against the Portland Trail Blazers.

Despite success on the court, injuries limited him to just 50 games in his first season with the Bucks, and Milwaukee struggled without him playing. Brandon was among the league leaders in steals and led the team in assists during his two-year stint with the Bucks. Though he expressed interest in playing in Milwaukee long-term with Ray Allen, the Bucks feared they would be unable to re-sign Brandon or continue to lose his playing time to injuries and did not want to risk losing him without return.

=== Minnesota Timberwolves (1999–2003) ===
On March 12, 1999, after just 15 games in his second Milwaukee season, Brandon was traded to Minnesota in a three-team, nine player trade that sent Sam Cassell to Milwaukee and Stephon Marbury to the New Jersey Nets.

Paired with Kevin Garnett, Brandon helped lead Minnesota to their first 50-win season in 1999–2000 with averages of 17 points, 9 assists and 2 steals per game. However, he was often plagued by injuries and on February 13, 2002, he was placed on the injury list by the Timberwolves, from which he did not return. It was during his stint with the Timberwolves that Brandon would get to team up with and mentor Chauncey Billups.

On July 23, 2003, Brandon was traded to the Atlanta Hawks for salary cap purposes. He was waived by the Hawks on February 19, 2004, two years and 13 days after his last game, and he subsequently announced his retirement.

Brandon finished his career averaging 13.8 points, three rebounds, 6.1 assists and 1.6 steals per game, and came within six points of scoring 10,000 in his career. His career-high for assists registered in a game was 16, which he accomplished five times. He was inducted into the Oregon Sports Hall of Fame in 2006.

== Personal life ==
Brandon used to run the Terrell Brandon Barber Shop on Portland's Northeast Alberta Street (now a daycare center by the name of Multitude of Mercies), which was frequented by numerous NBA players. He is also a real estate developer and is CEO for Tee Bee Enterprises and Tee Bee Enterprise Music.

Brandon has two sons, Trevor, Terrell Jr, from a college relationship. His father, Charles, was a supply store supervisor for Oregon Health Sciences University, and was also an assistant pastor in a Pentecostal church. Brandon's mother, Charlotte, was one of the founders of Mothers of Professional Basketball Players, an organization for mothers of NBA players. Though Brandon was considered "underpaid" by NBA standards, he told his mom to retire immediately after he signed his first contract.

=== Extortion attempt ===
In late February 2008, Brandon and former NFL defensive back Anthony Newman were the victims of an extortion attempt. Both Brandon and Newman received letters demanding money. Brandon and his friend, Timothy Upshaw, went along with the letter's request for Brandon to leave a bag outside of his garage with money inside (though they only placed a single dollar bill and plain paper in the bag). Bobby Hayes, the man responsible for the letters, arrived to retrieve the bag when he was confronted by Upshaw. Police were later called to the scene after a resident heard men talking about killing someone. Bobby Hayes was brought into custody and later released on bail, receiving orders not to contact Brandon, Newman or their families.

== Career statistics ==
Legend
GP	Games played	GS	Games started	MPG	Minutes per game
FG%	Field goal percentage	3P%	3-point field goal percentage	FT%	Free throw percentage
RPG	Rebounds per game	APG	Assists per game	SPG	Steals per game
BPG	Blocks per game	PPG	Points per game	**Bold**	Career high

=== Regular season ===
Year	Team	GP	GS	MPG	FG%	3P%	FT%	RPG	APG	SPG	BPG	PPG
1991–92	Cleveland	**82**	9	19.6	.419	.043	.806	2.0	3.9	1.0	.3	7.4
1992–93	Cleveland	**82**	8	19.8	**.478**	.310	.825	2.2	3.7	1.0	.3	8.8
1993–94	Cleveland	73	10	21.2	.420	.219	.858	2.2	3.8	1.2	.2	8.3
1994–95	Cleveland	67	41	29.3	.448	.397	.855	2.8	5.4	1.6	.2	13.3
1995–96	Cleveland	75	75	34.3	.465	.387	.887	3.3	6.5	1.8	**.4**	19.3
1996–97	Cleveland	78	**78**	**36.8**	.438	.373	.902	**3.9**	6.3	1.8	**.4**	**19.5**
1997–98	Milwaukee	50	48	35.7	.464	.333	.846	3.5	7.7	**2.2**	.3	16.8
1998–99	Milwaukee	15	14	33.7	.409	.250	.839	3.5	6.9	1.6	.2	13.5
1998–99	Minnesota	21	20	33.9	.425	.263	.830	**3.9**	**9.8**	1.9	.3	14.2
1999–00	Minnesota	71	71	36.4	.466	.**402**	.899	3.4	8.9	1.9	**.4**	17.1
2000–01	Minnesota	78	**78**	36.2	.451	.363	.871	3.8	7.5	2.1	.3	16.0
2001–02	Minnesota	32	28	30.1	.425	.174	**.988**	2.9	8.3	1.6	.2	12.4
Career		724	480	29.8	.448	.355	.873	3.0	6.1	1.6	.3	13.8
All-Star		2	0	18.5	.381	.375	1.000	2.9	5.5	1.5	.5	10.5

=== Playoffs ===
Year	Team	GP	GS	MPG	FG%	3P%	FT%	RPG	APG	SPG	BPG	PPG
1992	Cleveland	**12**	0	13.1	.400	.000	.750	1.8	2.5	.3	.1	3.9
1993	Cleveland	8	0	16.5	.435	.400	**1.000**	2.1	2.1	.9	.4	6.4
1994	Cleveland	3	0	18.7	**.632**	—	.667	1.3	1.7	.3	.0	8.7
1996	Cleveland	3	3	**41.7**	.447	.333	.867	3.0	8.0	1.3	.3	19.3
1999	Minnesota	4	**4**	40.3	.449	**.600**	.923	**7.5**	7.0	**2.3**	**.5**	19.3
2000	Minnesota	4	**4**	40.5	.508	.364	.909	5.8	**8.5**	.8	.0	**19.5**
2001	Minnesota	4	**4**	38.3	.435	.444	**1.000**	4.3	6.3	1.9	**.5**	15.3
Career		38	15	24.9	.457	.381	.897	3.2	4.3	.8	.2	10.5

== See also ==
- List of NBA career free throw percentage leaders
