= 1998–99 Golden State Warriors season =

NBA professional basketball team season

- Head coach: P. J. Carlesimo
- Owners: Chris Cohan
- Arena: The Arena in Oakland

Results
- Record: 21–29 (.420)
- Place: Division: 6th (Pacific); Conference: 11th (Western)
- Playoff finish: Did not qualify
- Stats at Basketball Reference

Local media
- Television: KTVU; KICU-TV; Fox Sports Bay Area
- Radio: KNBR

The 1998–99 Golden State Warriors season was the 53rd season for the Golden State Warriors in the National Basketball Association, and their 37th season in the San Francisco Bay Area. Due to a lockout, the regular season began on February 5, 1999, and was cut from 82 games to 50.

== Season summary ==
=== Off-season ===
The Warriors received the fifth overall pick in the 1998 NBA draft, and selected shooting guard Vince Carter from the University of North Carolina; however, the team soon traded Carter to the Toronto Raptors in exchange for his "UNC" college teammate, small forward and first-round draft pick Antawn Jamison on draft day. During the off-season, the team acquired John Starks, Chris Mills and Terry Cummings from the New York Knicks; Starks previously played for the Warriors during the 1988–89 season.

=== Regular season ===
With the addition of Jamison, Starks, Mills and Cummings, the Warriors lost their first five games of the regular season, but then won six of their next seven games, which led to a 6–6 start to the season. However, the team played below .500 in winning percentage for the remainder of the season, but won two more games than the previous season, finishing in sixth place in the Pacific Division with a 21–29 record, but missed the NBA playoffs for the fifth consecutive year.

Starks led the Warriors in scoring with a low team-high average of 13.8 points, 4.7 assists and 1.4 steals per game, and also led them with 78 three-point field goals, while Donyell Marshall averaged 11.0 points and 7.1 rebounds per game, and Mills provided the team with 10.3 points and 5.0 rebounds per game. In addition, Jamison provided with 9.6 points and 6.4 rebounds per game, and was named to the NBA All-Rookie Second Team, while Bimbo Coles contributed 9.5 points and 4.6 assists per game, Cummings averaged 9.1 points and 5.1 rebounds per game, and Erick Dampier provided with 8.8 points, 7.6 rebounds and 1.2 blocks per game. Meanwhile, Jason Caffey averaged 8.8 points and 5.9 rebounds per game, but only played 35 games due to an Achilles injury, Tony Delk contributed 6.8 points and 2.6 assists per game, Muggsy Bogues contributed 5.1 points, 3.7 assists and 1.2 steals per game, and second-year center Adonal Foyle provided with 2.9 points, 4.4 rebounds and 1.0 blocks per game.

The Warriors finished 26th in the NBA in home-game attendance, with an attendance of 335,837 at The Arena in Oakland during the regular season, which was the fourth-lowest in the league.

=== Aftermath ===
Following the season, Coles and Duane Ferrell were both traded to the Atlanta Hawks, while Bogues signed as a free agent with the Toronto Raptors, Delk signed with the Sacramento Kings, and Felton Spencer signed with the San Antonio Spurs.

== Offseason ==
=== Draft picks ===
Round	Pick	Player	Position	Nationality	College
1	5	Vince Carter	SG/SF	United States	North Carolina

== Roster ==
1998–99 Golden State Warriors roster
Players

Pos.	No.	Player	Height	Weight	DOB	From
G	1	Muggsy Bogues	5 ft 3 in (1.60 m)	136 lb (62 kg)	1965–01–09	Wake Forest
F/C	21	Jason Caffey (injured)	6 ft 8 in (2.03 m)	255 lb (116 kg)	1973–06–12	Alabama
G	12	Bimbo Coles	6 ft 1 in (1.85 m)	180 lb (82 kg)	1968–04–22	Virginia Tech
F/C	35	Terry Cummings	6 ft 9 in (2.06 m)	220 lb (100 kg)	1961–03–15	DePaul
C	25	Erick Dampier	6 ft 11 in (2.11 m)	265 lb (120 kg)	1974–07–14	Mississippi State
G	00	Tony Delk	6 ft 1 in (1.85 m)	189 lb (86 kg)	1974–01–28	Kentucky
G/F	33	Duane Ferrell	6 ft 7 in (2.01 m)	209 lb (95 kg)	1965–02–28	Georgia Tech
C	31	Adonal Foyle	6 ft 10 in (2.08 m)	270 lb (122 kg)	1975–03–09	Colgate
F	7	Antawn Jamison	6 ft 8 in (2.03 m)	223 lb (101 kg)	1976–06–12	North Carolina
F	3	Donyell Marshall	6 ft 9 in (2.06 m)	218 lb (99 kg)	1973–05–18	Connecticut
G/F	34	Chris Mills	6 ft 6 in (1.98 m)	215 lb (98 kg)	1970–01–25	Arizona
C	50	Felton Spencer	7 ft 0 in (2.13 m)	265 lb (120 kg)	1968–01–15	Louisville
G	9	John Starks	6 ft 3 in (1.91 m)	180 lb (82 kg)	1965–08–10	Oklahoma State

Coaches
Head coach
- P. J. Carlesimo
Assistant(s)
- Bob Staak
- Rod Higgins
- Paul Westhead

Legend
- (DP) Unsigned draft pick
- (FA) Free agent
- (S) Suspended
- Injured

Roster

== Regular season ==
=== Season standings ===
Pacific Division	W	L	PCT	GB	Home	Road	Div
y-Portland Trail Blazers	35	15	.700	–	22–3	13–12	15–7
x-Los Angeles Lakers	31	19	.620	4	18–7	13–12	14–8
x-Sacramento Kings	27	23	.540	8	16–9	11–14	11–9
x-Phoenix Suns	27	23	.540	8	15–10	12–13	9–10
Seattle SuperSonics	25	25	.500	10	17–8	8–17	11–10
Golden State Warriors	21	29	.420	14	13–12	8–17	8–11
Los Angeles Clippers	9	41	.180	26	6–19	3–22	3–16

#	Western Conference				
#	Team	W	L	PCT	GB
1	z-San Antonio Spurs	37	13	.740	–
2	y-Portland Trail Blazers	35	15	.700	2
3	x-Utah Jazz	37	13	.740	–
4	x-Los Angeles Lakers	31	19	.620	6
5	x-Houston Rockets	31	19	.620	6
6	x-Sacramento Kings	27	23	.540	10
7	x-Phoenix Suns	27	23	.540	10
8	x-Minnesota Timberwolves	25	25	.500	12
9	Seattle SuperSonics	25	25	.500	12
10	Golden State Warriors	21	29	.420	16
11	Dallas Mavericks	19	31	.380	18
12	Denver Nuggets	14	36	.280	23
13	Los Angeles Clippers	9	41	.180	28
14	Vancouver Grizzlies	8	42	.160	29

z - clinched division title
y - clinched division title
x - clinched playoff spot

== Player statistics ==
Legend
GP	Games played	GS	Games started	MPG	Minutes per game
FG%	Field-goal percentage	3P%	3-point field-goal percentage	FT%	Free-throw percentage
RPG	Rebounds per game	APG	Assists per game	SPG	Steals per game
BPG	Blocks per game	PPG	Points per game

=== Regular season ===
Player	GP	GS	MPG	FG%	3P%	FT%	RPG	APG	SPG	BPG	PPG
John Starks	50	50	33.7	.370	.290	.740	3.3	4.7	1.4	.1	13.8
Erick Dampier	50	50	28.3	.389		.588	7.6	1.1	.5	1.2	8.8
Terry Cummings	50	0	20.2	.439	1.000	.711	5.1	1.2	.9	.2	9.1
Bimbo Coles	48	32	26.5	.442	.240	.822	2.4	4.6	.9	.2	9.5
Donyell Marshall	48	20	26.0	.421	.361	.727	7.1	1.4	1.0	.8	11.0
Chris Mills	47	24	29.7	.411	.278	.823	5.0	2.2	.8	.3	10.3
Antawn Jamison	47	24	22.5	.452	.300	.588	6.4	.7	.8	.3	9.6
Adonal Foyle	44	0	14.0	.430		.490	4.4	.4	.3	1.0	2.9
Tony Delk	36	13	17.5	.364	.242	.648	1.5	2.6	.4	.2	6.8
Muggsy Bogues	36	5	19.8	.494	.000	.861	2.0	3.7	1.2	.0	5.1
Jason Caffey	35	32	25.0	.444	.000	.633	5.9	.5	.7	.3	8.8
Felton Spencer	26	0	6.1	.455		.462	1.8	.0	.2	.4	1.6
Duane Ferrell	8	0	5.8	.071		.750	.8	.0	.1	.1	.6

Player statistics citation:

== Awards and records ==
- Antawn Jamison, NBA All-Rookie Team, 2nd Team

== Transactions ==
=== Trades ===
January 23, 1999	To Golden State Warriors Terry Cummings; Chris Mills; John Starks	To New York Knicks Latrell Sprewell

February 4, 1999	To Golden State Warriors 1999 first-round pick	To Utah Jazz Todd Fuller

June 29, 1999	To Golden State Warriors Mookie Blaylock; 1999 first-round pick	To Atlanta Hawks Bimbo Coles; Duane Ferrell; 1999 first-round pick

=== Free agents ===
Additions
Player	Date signed	Former team
Tony Farmer	January 21	Charlotte Hornets

Subtractions
Player	Date signed	New Team
Jeff Grayer	January 26	Quad City Thunder (CBA)
Tony Farmer	January 26	Golden State Warriors
Gerald Madkins	February 2	Joventut Badalona (Spain)

Player Transactions Citation:

== See also ==
- 1998-99 NBA season
