= 1998–99 Seattle SuperSonics season =

NBA professional basketball team season

- Head coach: Paul Westphal
- General manager: Wally Walker
- Arena: KeyArena at Seattle Center

Results
- Record: 25–25 (.500)
- Place: Division: 5th (Pacific); Conference: 9th (Western)
- Playoff finish: Did not qualify
- Stats at Basketball Reference

Local media
- Television: KSTW; Fox Sports Northwest (Kevin Calabro, Marques Johnson)
- Radio: KJR (Kevin Calabro, Marques Johnson)

The 1998–99 Seattle SuperSonics season was the 32nd season for the Seattle SuperSonics in the National Basketball Association. Due to a lockout, the regular season began on February 5, 1999, and was cut from 82 games to 50.

== Season summary ==
=== Off-season ===
During the off-season, the SuperSonics signed free agents Billy Owens and former Sonics center Olden Polynice, and acquired Don MacLean from the New Jersey Nets. The team also hired Paul Westphal as their new head coach.

=== Regular season ===
Under Westphal, and with the addition of Polynice and Owens, the SuperSonics got off to a fast start by winning their first six games of the regular season. However, the team soon struggled losing nine of their next twelve games, as Vin Baker only played 34 games due to thumb and knee injuries; Owens and MacLean both missed large parts of the season also due to injuries. At mid-season, the team signed free agent John Crotty, who was previously released by the Portland Trail Blazers. As the season progressed, the SuperSonics played around .500 in winning percentage for the remainder of the season, and finished in fifth place in the Pacific Division with a 25–25 record. The SuperSonics lost a tie-breaker for the eighth seed in the Western Conference to the Minnesota Timberwolves, and failed to qualify for the NBA playoffs for the first time since the 1989–90 season.

Gary Payton averaged 21.7 points, 8.7 assists and 2.2 steals per game, contributed 83 three-point field goals, and was named to the All-NBA Second Team, and to the NBA All-Defensive First Team. In addition, Detlef Schrempf averaged 15.0 points and 7.4 rebounds per game, while Baker provided the team with 13.8 points and 6.2 rebounds per game, sixth man Dale Ellis contributed 10.3 points per game, and led the SuperSonics with 94 three-point field goals off the bench, and Hersey Hawkins provided with 10.3 points and 1.6 steals per game. Meanwhile, MacLean contributed 10.9 points per game in only just 17 games, Owens provided with 7.8 points in only just 21 games, Polynice averaged 7.7 points and 8.9 rebounds per game, and Crotty contributed 6.1 points and 2.4 assists per game in 24 games.

Payton finished in ninth place in Most Valuable Player voting, and also finished in third place in Defensive Player of the Year voting. The SuperSonics finished 14th in the NBA in home-game attendance, with an attendance of 426,800 at the KeyArena at Seattle Center during the regular season.

=== Aftermath ===
Following the season, Schrempf signed as a free agent with the Portland Trail Blazers, while Hawkins was traded to the Chicago Bulls, and Polynice signed with the Utah Jazz. Meanwhile, Crotty signed with the Detroit Pistons, and Ellis, Owens and MacLean were all traded to the Orlando Magic on draft day. However, all three players would never play for the Magic, as Ellis was traded to the Milwaukee Bucks, Owens was traded to the Philadelphia 76ers, and MacLean was dealt to the Houston Rockets in a three-team trade, but was released to free agency, and would later on sign with the Phoenix Suns near the end of the following season.

== Draft picks ==
Round	Pick	Player	Position	Nationality	College
1	27	Vladimir Stepania	C	Georgia	KK Olimpija
2	32	Rashard Lewis	SF	United States	Alief Elsik High School
2	33	Jelani McCoy	PF/C	United States	UCLA

== Roster ==
1998–99 Seattle SuperSonics roster
Players

Pos.	No.	Player	Height	Weight	DOB	From
F/C	42	Vin Baker	6 ft 11 in (2.11 m)	232 lb (105 kg)	1971–11–23	Hartford
G	12	Drew Barry	6 ft 5 in (1.96 m)	191 lb (87 kg)	1973–02–17	Georgia Tech
G	4	James Cotton (injured)	6 ft 5 in (1.96 m)	220 lb (100 kg)	1975–12–14	Long Beach State
G	22	John Crotty	6 ft 1 in (1.85 m)	185 lb (84 kg)	1969–07–15	Virginia
G/F	3	Dale Ellis	6 ft 7 in (2.01 m)	205 lb (93 kg)	1960–08–06	Tennessee
G	33	Hersey Hawkins	6 ft 3 in (1.91 m)	190 lb (86 kg)	1966–09–29	Bradley
G/F	7	Rashard Lewis (injured)	6 ft 10 in (2.08 m)	215 lb (98 kg)	1979–08–08	Alief Elsik HS (TX)
F/C	34	Jelani McCoy	6 ft 10 in (2.08 m)	245 lb (111 kg)	1977–12–06	UCLA
F	24	Don MacLean	6 ft 10 in (2.08 m)	235 lb (107 kg)	1970–01–16	UCLA
G	6	Moochie Norris	6 ft 1 in (1.85 m)	175 lb (79 kg)	1973–07–27	West Florida
G/F	30	Billy Owens (injured)	6 ft 8 in (2.03 m)	220 lb (100 kg)	1969–05–01	Syracuse
G	20	Gary Payton	6 ft 4 in (1.93 m)	180 lb (82 kg)	1968–07–23	Oregon State
C	0	Olden Polynice	6 ft 11 in (2.11 m)	220 lb (100 kg)	1964–11–21	Virginia
F	11	Detlef Schrempf	6 ft 10 in (2.08 m)	214 lb (97 kg)	1963–01–21	Washington
C	5	Vladimir Stepania	7 ft 0 in (2.13 m)	236 lb (107 kg)	1976–05–08	Georgia
F/C	15	Aaron Williams	6 ft 9 in (2.06 m)	220 lb (100 kg)	1971–10–02	Xavier

Coaches
Head coach
- Paul Westphal
Assistant(s)
- Dwane Casey
- Bob Weiss

Legend
- (DP) Unsigned draft pick
- (FA) Free agent
- (S) Suspended
- Injured

== Regular season ==
=== Season standings ===
Pacific Division	W	L	PCT	GB	Home	Road	Div
y-Portland Trail Blazers	35	15	.700	–	22–3	13–12	15–7
x-Los Angeles Lakers	31	19	.620	4	18–7	13–12	14–8
x-Sacramento Kings	27	23	.540	8	16–9	11–14	11–9
x-Phoenix Suns	27	23	.540	8	15–10	12–13	9–10
Seattle SuperSonics	25	25	.500	10	17–8	8–17	11–10
Golden State Warriors	21	29	.420	14	13–12	8–17	8–11
Los Angeles Clippers	9	41	.180	26	6–19	3–22	3–16

#	Western Conference				
#	Team	W	L	PCT	GB
1	z-San Antonio Spurs	37	13	.740	–
2	y-Portland Trail Blazers	35	15	.700	2
3	x-Utah Jazz	37	13	.740	–
4	x-Los Angeles Lakers	31	19	.620	6
5	x-Houston Rockets	31	19	.620	6
6	x-Sacramento Kings	27	23	.540	10
7	x-Phoenix Suns	27	23	.540	10
8	x-Minnesota Timberwolves	25	25	.500	12
9	Seattle SuperSonics	25	25	.500	12
10	Golden State Warriors	21	29	.420	16
11	Dallas Mavericks	19	31	.380	18
12	Denver Nuggets	14	36	.280	23
13	Los Angeles Clippers	9	41	.180	28
14	Vancouver Grizzlies	8	42	.160	29

z – clinched division title
y – clinched division title
x – clinched playoff spot

== Player statistics ==
Legend
GP	Games played	GS	Games started	MPG	Minutes per game
FG%	Field-goal percentage	3P%	3-point field-goal percentage	FT%	Free-throw percentage
RPG	Rebounds per game	APG	Assists per game	SPG	Steals per game
BPG	Blocks per game	PPG	Points per game

=== Season ===
Player	GP	GS	MPG	FG%	3P%	FT%	RPG	APG	SPG	BPG	PPG
Gary Payton	50	50	40.2	.434	.295	.721	4.9	8.7	2.2	.2	21.7
Detlef Schrempf	50	39	35.3	.472	.395	.823	7.4	3.7	.8	.5	15.0
Hersey Hawkins	50	34	32.9	.419	.306	.902	4.0	2.5	1.6	.4	10.3
Olden Polynice	48	47	30.9	.472	1.000	.309	8.9	.9	.4	.6	7.7
Dale Ellis	48	5	25.7	.441	.433	.757	2.4	.8	.5	.1	10.3
Aaron Williams	40	2	11.5	.423	.000	.730	3.2	.6	.4	.6	4.0
Vin Baker	34	31	34.2	.453	.000	.450	6.2	1.6	.9	1.0	13.8
Jelani McCoy	26	0	12.7	.737		.500	3.0	.2	.4	.8	5.1
John Crotty^{†}	24	0	15.1	.405	.371	.851	1.3	2.4	.4	.0	6.1
Vladimir Stepania	23	6	13.6	.424	.000	.525	3.3	.5	.4	1.0	5.5
Billy Owens	21	19	21.5	.394	.455	.800	3.8	1.8	.6	.2	7.8
Rashard Lewis	20	7	7.3	.365	.167	.571	1.3	.2	.4	.1	2.4
Don MacLean	17	10	21.5	.396	.273	.625	3.8	.9	.3	.3	10.9
Drew Barry	17	0	10.8	.313	.333	.692	1.2	1.7	.4	.1	2.2
Moochie Norris	12	0	11.7	.325	.400	.375	1.7	2.0	.6	.0	3.2
James Cotton	10	0	5.9	.333	.000	.722	1.0	.0	.3	.0	2.5

Player statistics citation:

== Awards and records ==
=== Awards ===
- Gary Payton, All-NBA Second Team
- Gary Payton, NBA All-Defensive First Team

== See also ==
- 1998–99 NBA season
