= 1998–99 Utah Jazz season =

NBA professional basketball team season

- Head coach: Jerry Sloan
- General manager: Tim Howells
- Owner: Larry H. Miller
- Arena: Delta Center

Results
- Record: 37–13 (.740)
- Place: Division: 2nd (Midwest); Conference: 3rd (Western)
- Playoff finish: Conference semifinals (lost to Trail Blazers 2–4)
- Stats at Basketball Reference

Local media
- Television: KJZZ-TV; Fox Sports Utah
- Radio: KFNZ

The 1998–99 Utah Jazz season was the 25th season for the Utah Jazz in the National Basketball Association, and their 20th season in Salt Lake City, Utah. Due to a lockout, the regular season began on February 5, 1999, and was cut from 82 games to 50.

== Season summary ==
=== Off-season ===
The Jazz entered the regular season once again as runners-up in the NBA Finals, having lost back-to-back NBA Finals to the Chicago Bulls, both in six games. However, with Michael Jordan retiring for a second time, Scottie Pippen being traded to the Houston Rockets, Dennis Rodman signing with the Los Angeles Lakers as a free agent, and Phil Jackson's contract expiring, the Bulls dynasty that headlined much of the 1990s was dramatically dismantled, and the Jazz hoped to make the NBA Finals for a third time. During the off-season, the team re-signed free agent, and former Jazz forward Thurl Bailey, who came out of his retirement; Bailey last played for the Minnesota Timberwolves during the 1993–94 season.

For the season, the Jazz revealed new black alternate road uniforms, which featured copper side panels on their jerseys and shorts; these uniforms would remain in use until 2004.

=== Regular season ===
The Jazz got off to a 19–4 start to the regular season, and later on posted an 11-game winning streak in April. However, the team played around .500 in winning percentage for the remainder of the season, but managed to finish in second place in the Midwest Division with a league-best 37–13 record, earning the third seed in the Western Conference; however, their record was tied with the San Antonio Spurs, who won the Midwest Division title by a tie-breaker. The Jazz qualified for the NBA playoffs for the 16th consecutive year.

Karl Malone averaged 23.8 points, 9.4 rebounds and 4.1 assists per game, and was named the NBA Most Valuable Player of the Year for the second time; he was also named to the All-NBA First Team, and to the NBA All-Defensive First Team. In addition, Bryon Russell returned to the starting lineup after coming off the bench the previous season, averaging 12.4 points, 5.3 rebounds and 1.5 steals per game, while Jeff Hornacek contributed 12.2 points and 4.0 assists per game, and John Stockton provided the team with 11.1 points, 7.5 assists and 1.6 steals per game, and was named to the All-NBA Third Team. Meanwhile, Greg Ostertag averaged 7.3 rebounds and 2.7 blocks per game, while off the bench, Shandon Anderson contributed 8.5 points per game, and Howard Eisley provided with 7.5 points and 3.7 assists per game.

Russell and Ostertag both finished tied in tenth place in Most Improved Player voting, while Eisley finished in eighth place in Sixth Man of the Year voting, and head coach Jerry Sloan finished in third place in Coach of the Year voting. The Jazz finished fourth in the NBA in home-game attendance, with an attendance of 493,120 at the Delta Center during the regular season.

=== NBA playoffs ===
In the Western Conference First Round of the 1999 NBA playoffs, the Jazz faced off against the 6th–seeded Sacramento Kings, a team that featured All-Star forward Chris Webber, Vlade Divac, and rookie point guard Jason Williams. With the series tied at 1–1, the Jazz struggled and faced elimination after losing Game 3 to the Kings on the road in overtime, 84–81 at the ARCO Arena II as the Kings took a 2–1 series lead. However, the Jazz managed to win Game 4 on the road, 90–89 to even the series, and then won Game 5 over the Kings at home in overtime, 99–92 at the Delta Center to win in a hard-fought five-game series.

In the Western Conference Semi-finals, the team faced off against the 2nd–seeded, and Pacific Division champion Portland Trail Blazers, who were led by Isaiah Rider, Rasheed Wallace and Damon Stoudamire. The Jazz had home-court advantage in the series since they finished with a better regular-season record than the Trail Blazers. Despite this, the Trail Blazers took a 3–1 series lead, but the Jazz managed to win Game 5 at home, 88–71 at the Delta Center. However, the Jazz lost Game 6 to the Trail Blazers on the road, 92–80 at the Rose Garden Arena, thus losing the series in six games.

=== Aftermath ===
Following the season, Anderson signed as a free agent with the Houston Rockets, while Greg Foster signed with the Seattle SuperSonics, and Bailey retired for the second time.

== Draft picks ==
Round	Pick	Player	Position	Nationality	College
1	29	Nazr Mohammed	C/PF	United States	Kentucky
2	57	Torraye Braggs	PF/C	United States	Xavier

== Roster ==
1998–99 Utah Jazz roster
Players

Pos.	No.	Player	Height	Weight	DOB	From
G/F	40	Shandon Anderson	6 ft 6 in (1.98 m)	208 lb (94 kg)	1973–12–31	Georgia
F	54	Anthony Avent	6 ft 9 in (2.06 m)	235 lb (107 kg)	1969–10–18	Seton Hall
F/C	41	Thurl Bailey	6 ft 11 in (2.11 m)	215 lb (98 kg)	1961–04–07	NC State
G	10	Howard Eisley	6 ft 2 in (1.88 m)	177 lb (80 kg)	1972–12–04	Boston College
F/C	44	Greg Foster	6 ft 11 in (2.11 m)	240 lb (109 kg)	1968–10–03	UTEP
C	52	Todd Fuller	6 ft 11 in (2.11 m)	255 lb (116 kg)	1974–07–25	NC State
G	14	Jeff Hornacek	6 ft 3 in (1.91 m)	190 lb (86 kg)	1963–05–03	Iowa State
F	31	Adam Keefe	6 ft 9 in (2.06 m)	230 lb (104 kg)	1970–02–22	Stanford
F	32	Karl Malone	6 ft 9 in (2.06 m)	250 lb (113 kg)	1963–07–24	Louisiana Tech
C	00	Greg Ostertag	7 ft 2 in (2.18 m)	280 lb (127 kg)	1973–03–06	Kansas
F	3	Bryon Russell	6 ft 7 in (2.01 m)	225 lb (102 kg)	1970–12–31	Long Beach State
G	12	John Stockton	6 ft 1 in (1.85 m)	170 lb (77 kg)	1962–03–26	Gonzaga
G	11	Jacque Vaughn	6 ft 1 in (1.85 m)	190 lb (86 kg)	1975–02–11	Kansas

Coaches
Head coach
- Jerry Sloan
Assistant(s)
- Gordon Chiesa
- David Fredman
- Phil Johnson
- Mark McKown
- Kenny Natt

Legend
- (DP) Unsigned draft pick
- (FA) Free agent
- (S) Suspended
- Injured

Roster
Updated: March 2, 1999

== Regular season ==
=== Season standings ===
Midwest Division	W	L	PCT	GB	Home	Road	Div
y-San Antonio Spurs	37	13	.740	–	21–4	16–9	17–4
x-Utah Jazz	37	13	.740	–	22–3	15–10	15–3
x-Houston Rockets	31	19	.620	6	19–6	12–13	12–9
x-Minnesota Timberwolves	25	25	.500	12	18–7	7–18	11–9
Dallas Mavericks	19	31	.380	18	15–10	4–21	8–12
Denver Nuggets	14	36	.280	23	12–13	2–23	5–16
Vancouver Grizzlies	8	42	.160	29	7–18	1–24	3–18

#	Western Conference				
#	Team	W	L	PCT	GB
1	z-San Antonio Spurs	37	13	.740	–
2	y-Portland Trail Blazers	35	15	.700	2
3	x-Utah Jazz	37	13	.740	–
4	x-Los Angeles Lakers	31	19	.620	6
5	x-Houston Rockets	31	19	.620	6
6	x-Sacramento Kings	27	23	.540	10
7	x-Phoenix Suns	27	23	.540	10
8	x-Minnesota Timberwolves	25	25	.500	12
9	Seattle SuperSonics	25	25	.500	12
10	Golden State Warriors	21	29	.420	16
11	Dallas Mavericks	19	31	.380	18
12	Denver Nuggets	14	36	.280	23
13	Los Angeles Clippers	9	41	.180	28
14	Vancouver Grizzlies	8	42	.160	29

== Playoffs ==
1999 playoff game log
First round: 3–2 (home: 2–1; road: 1–1)

Game	Date	Team	Score	High points	High rebounds	High assists	Location Attendance	Series
1	May 8	Sacramento	W 117–87	Karl Malone (21)	Greg Ostertag (9)	Karl Malone (9)	Delta Center; 19,911	1–0
2	May 10	Sacramento	L 90–101	Karl Malone (33)	Karl Malone (10)	Eisley, Stockton (6)	Delta Center; 19,911	1–1
3	May 12	@ Sacramento	L 81–84 (OT)	Karl Malone (22)	Karl Malone (13)	Malone, Stockton (5)	ARCO Arena; 17,317	1–2
4	May 14	@ Sacramento	W 90–89	Karl Malone (23)	Karl Malone (16)	John Stockton (8)	ARCO Arena; 17,317	2–2
5	May 16	Sacramento	W 99–92 (OT)	Karl Malone (20)	Karl Malone (12)	John Stockton (14)	Delta Center; 19,911	3–2

Conference Semi-finals: 2–4 (home: 2–1; road: 0–3)

Game	Date	Team	Score	High points	High rebounds	High assists	Location Attendance	Series
1	May 18	Portland	W 93–83	Karl Malone (25)	Karl Malone (12)	John Stockton (7)	Delta Center; 19,911	1–0
2	May 20	Portland	L 81–84	Karl Malone (23)	Karl Malone (17)	John Stockton (9)	Delta Center; 19,911	1–1
3	May 22	@ Portland	L 87–97	Karl Malone (25)	Karl Malone (14)	John Stockton (5)	Rose Garden; 20,720	1–2
4	May 23	@ Portland	L 75–81	Malone, Russell (17)	Karl Malone (11)	John Stockton (10)	Rose Garden; 20,720	1–3
5	May 25	Portland	W 88–71	Karl Malone (23)	Ostertag, Russell (9)	John Stockton (14)	Delta Center; 19,911	2–3
6	May 27	@ Portland	L 80–92	Jeff Hornacek (21)	Karl Malone (7)	John Stockton (10)	Rose Garden; 20,727	2–4

1999 schedule

== Player statistics ==
Legend
GP	Games played	GS	Games started	MPG	Minutes per game
FG%	Field-goal percentage	3P%	3-point field-goal percentage	FT%	Free-throw percentage
RPG	Rebounds per game	APG	Assists per game	SPG	Steals per game
BPG	Blocks per game	PPG	Points per game

=== Season ===
Player	GP	GS	MPG	FG%	3FG%	FT%	RPG	APG	SPG	BPG	PPG
Shandon Anderson	50	2	21.4	.446	.341	.712	2.6	1.1	.8	.2	8.5
Anthony Avent	5	0	8.8	.308		.500	2.4	.2	.4	.0	1.8
Thurl Bailey	43	0	12.6	.446	.000	.735	2.2	.6	.2	.7	4.2
Howard Eisley	50	0	20.8	.446	.420	.838	1.9	3.7	.6	.0	7.4
Greg Foster	42	1	10.9	.377	.250	.619	2.0	.6	.1	.2	2.8
Todd Fuller	42	2	11.0	.452		.600	2.4	.1	.1	.3	3.4
Jeff Hornacek	48	48	29.9	.477	.420	.893	3.3	4.0	1.1	.3	12.2
Adam Keefe	44	0	14.6	.452	.000	.697	3.2	.6	.4	.3	4.0
Chris King	8	0	5.3	.286		.000	1.4	.1	.3	.1	.5
Karl Malone	49	49	37.4	.493	.000	.788	9.4	4.1	1.3	.6	23.8
Greg Ostertag	48	48	27.9	.476		.620	7.3	.5	.3	2.7	5.7
Bryon Russell	50	50	35.4	.464	.354	.795	5.3	1.5	1.5	.3	12.4
John Stockton	50	50	28.2	.488	.320	.811	2.9	7.5	1.6	.3	11.1
Jacque Vaughn	19	0	4.6	.367	.250	.833	.6	.6	.3	.0	2.3

=== Playoffs ===
Player	GP	GS	MPG	FG%	3FG%	FT%	RPG	APG	SPG	BPG	PPG
Shandon Anderson	11	0	27.0	.481	.429	.706	3.7	1.2	.5	.3	9.5
Thurl Bailey	11	0	10.5	.515		.750	1.4	.2	.3	.5	3.4
Howard Eisley	11	0	21.9	.366	.208	.828	1.8	2.9	.6	.3	7.4
Greg Foster	8	0	8.8	.421			1.0	.1	.1	.0	2.0
Todd Fuller	10	0	10.5	.385		.600	2.8	.0	.0	.2	2.6
Jeff Hornacek	11	11	27.6	.462	.389	.879	3.7	2.4	1.0	.0	12.2
Adam Keefe	10	0	10.1	.600		1.000	2.4	.3	.4	.3	4.1
Karl Malone	11	11	41.0	.417	.000	.791	11.3	4.7	1.2	.7	21.8
Greg Ostertag	11	11	23.7	.371		.643	5.9	.5	.2	2.2	4.0
Bryon Russell	11	11	35.2	.426	.250	.722	6.1	1.2	1.8	.2	12.1
John Stockton	11	11	32.0	.400	.333	.739	3.3	8.4	1.6	.1	11.1
Jacque Vaughn	2	0	3.0	.500	1.000		.0	1.0	.0	.0	1.5

Player statistics citation:

== Awards and records ==
- Karl Malone, NBA Most Valuable Player Award
- Karl Malone, All-NBA First Team
- John Stockton, All-NBA Third Team
- Karl Malone, NBA All-Defensive First Team
