= 1998–99 Los Angeles Clippers season =

NBA professional basketball team season

- Head coach: Chris Ford
- Owners: Donald Sterling
- Arena: Los Angeles Memorial Sports Arena; Arrowhead Pond

Results
- Record: 9–41 (.180)
- Place: Division: 7th (Pacific); Conference: 13th (Western)
- Playoff finish: Did not qualify
- Stats at Basketball Reference

Local media
- Television: KCAL-TV; Fox Sports West 2 (Ralph Lawler, Bill Walton)
- Radio: KXTA (Rory Markas)

The 1998–99 Los Angeles Clippers season was the 29th season for the Los Angeles Clippers in the National Basketball Association, and their 15th season in Los Angeles, California. Due to a lockout, the regular season began on February 5, 1999, and was cut from 82 games to 50. This was also the team's final season in which they played their home games at the Los Angeles Memorial Sports Arena, and played occasional home games at the Arrowhead Pond in Anaheim, California.

== Season summary ==
=== Off-season ===
The Clippers won the NBA draft lottery, and selected center Michael Olowokandi out of Pacific University with the first overall pick in the 1998 NBA draft. During the off-season, the team signed free agents Sherman Douglas, and undrafted rookie small forward Tyrone Nesby, and hired Chris Ford as their new head coach.

=== Regular season ===
However, under Ford and despite the addition of Olowokandi, Nesby and Douglas, the Clippers struggled suffering a dreadful 17-game losing streak to start the regular season. The team's 0–17 record tied the 1988–89 Miami Heat for the then-worst start in NBA history, and would later on be tied by the 2014–15 Philadelphia 76ers; the record would eventually be surpassed by the 2009–10 New Jersey Nets, and the 2015–16 Philadelphia 76ers, who both lost their first 18 games of the regular season. At mid-season, the Clippers signed second-year guard Troy Hudson in March. The Clippers posted a six-game losing streak between March and April, which led to a dreadful 3–30 record as of April 6, 1999, and then lost their final six games of the season, finishing in last place in the Pacific Division with an awful 9–41 record. The Clippers tied the 1972–73 Philadelphia 76ers for the fourth-lowest win total for a season behind the 1998–99 Vancouver Grizzlies, the 2011–12 Charlotte Bobcats, and the 1947–48 Providence Steamrollers.

Second-year forward Maurice Taylor showed improvement becoming the team's starting power forward, averaging 16.8 points and 5.3 rebounds per game, while Lamond Murray played a sixth man role off the bench, averaging 12.2 points per game, and three-point specialist Eric Piatkowski contributed 10.5 points per game, and led the Clippers with 65 three-point field goals. In addition, Nesby provided the team with 10.1 points and 1.5 steals per game, while Olowokandi averaged 8.9 points and 7.9 rebounds per game, and was named to the NBA All-Rookie Second Team, and Douglas contributed 8.2 points and 4.1 assists per game, but only played 30 games due to injury. Meanwhile, Darrick Martin contributed 8.0 points and 3.9 assists per game, Rodney Rogers provided with 7.4 points per game off the bench, Hudson contributed 6.8 points and 3.7 assists per game in 25 games, and Lorenzen Wright averaged 6.6 points and 7.5 rebounds per game.

Taylor finished in seventh place in Most Improved Player voting. For the sixth consecutive year, the Clippers finished last in the NBA in home-game attendance, with an attendance of 256,568 at the Los Angeles Memorial Sports Arena during the regular season, which was 29th in the league.

=== Aftermath ===
Following the season, Murray was traded to the Cleveland Cavaliers after five seasons with the Clippers, while Rogers signed as a free agent with the Phoenix Suns, and Wright was traded to the Atlanta Hawks. Meanwhile, Douglas re-signed with his former team, the New Jersey Nets, Martin signed with the Sacramento Kings, and Pooh Richardson was released to free agency.

== Draft picks ==
Round	Pick	Player	Position	Nationality	College
1	1	Michael Olowokandi	C	Nigeria	Pacific
1	22	Brian Skinner	PF	United States	Baylor

== Roster ==
1998–99 Los Angeles Clippers roster
Players

Pos.	No.	Player	Height	Weight	DOB	From
G	1	Scott Brooks (injured) (IN)	5 ft 11 in (1.80 m)	165 lb (75 kg)	––	UC Irvine
C	33	Keith Closs	7 ft 3 in (2.21 m)	215 lb (98 kg)	––	Central Connecticut State
G	20	Sherman Douglas	6 ft 0 in (1.83 m)	195 lb (88 kg)	1966–09–15	Syracuse
G	6	Troy Hudson	6 ft 1 in (1.85 m)	170 lb (77 kg)	––	Southern Illinois
G	15	Darrick Martin	5 ft 11 in (1.80 m)	170 lb (77 kg)	––	UCLA
F	7	Lamond Murray	6 ft 7 in (2.01 m)	236 lb (107 kg)	––	California
G/F	8	Tyrone Nesby	6 ft 6 in (1.98 m)	225 lb (102 kg)	––	UNLV
C	34	Michael Olowokandi	7 ft 0 in (2.13 m)	270 lb (122 kg)	––	Pacific
G	52	Eric Piatkowski	6 ft 7 in (2.01 m)	215 lb (98 kg)	1970–09–30	Nebraska
G	24	Pooh Richardson	6 ft 1 in (1.85 m)	180 lb (82 kg)	––	UCLA
F	54	Rodney Rogers	6 ft 7 in (2.01 m)	260 lb (118 kg)	1971–06–20	Wake Forest
F	32	Brian Skinner	6 ft 9 in (2.06 m)	230 lb (104 kg)	––	Michigan
G	5	Charles Smith	6 ft 5 in (1.96 m)	194 lb (88 kg)	––	New Mexico
F	23	Maurice Taylor	6 ft 9 in (2.06 m)	260 lb (118 kg)	––	Michigan
C	11	Stojko Vrankovic (injured)	7 ft 2 in (2.18 m)	260 lb (118 kg)	––	Croatia
F/C	55	Lorenzen Wright	6 ft 11 in (2.11 m)	240 lb (109 kg)	––	Memphis

Coaches
Head coach
- Chris Ford
Assistant(s)
- Jim Brewer
- Rex Kalamian
- Jim Todd

Legend
- (DP) Unsigned draft pick
- (FA) Free agent
- (S) Suspended
- (IN) Inactive
- Injured

Roster
Updated: 2009-10-04

=== Roster Notes ===
- Point guard Scott Brooks was on the injured reserve list due to a knee injury, missed the entire regular season, and never played for the Clippers.

== Regular season ==
=== Season standings ===
Pacific Division	W	L	PCT	GB	Home	Road	Div
y-Portland Trail Blazers	35	15	.700	–	22–3	13–12	15–7
x-Los Angeles Lakers	31	19	.620	4	18–7	13–12	14–8
x-Sacramento Kings	27	23	.540	8	16–9	11–14	11–9
x-Phoenix Suns	27	23	.540	8	15–10	12–13	9–10
Seattle SuperSonics	25	25	.500	10	17–8	8–17	11–10
Golden State Warriors	21	29	.420	14	13–12	8–17	8–11
Los Angeles Clippers	9	41	.180	26	6–19	3–22	3–16

#	Western Conference				
#	Team	W	L	PCT	GB
1	z-San Antonio Spurs	37	13	.740	–
2	y-Portland Trail Blazers	35	15	.700	2
3	x-Utah Jazz	37	13	.740	–
4	x-Los Angeles Lakers	31	19	.620	6
5	x-Houston Rockets	31	19	.620	6
6	x-Sacramento Kings	27	23	.540	10
7	x-Phoenix Suns	27	23	.540	10
8	x-Minnesota Timberwolves	25	25	.500	12
9	Seattle SuperSonics	25	25	.500	12
10	Golden State Warriors	21	29	.420	16
11	Dallas Mavericks	19	31	.380	18
12	Denver Nuggets	14	36	.280	23
13	Los Angeles Clippers	9	41	.180	28
14	Vancouver Grizzlies	8	42	.160	29

z - clinched division title
y - clinched division title
x - clinched playoff spot

== Player statistics ==
Legend
GP	Games played	GS	Games started	MPG	Minutes per game
FG%	Field-goal percentage	3P%	3-point field-goal percentage	FT%	Free-throw percentage
RPG	Rebounds per game	APG	Assists per game	SPG	Steals per game
BPG	Blocks per game	PPG	Points per game

Player	GP	GS	MPG	FG%	3P%	FT%	RPG	APG	SPG	BPG	PPG
Maurice Taylor	46	45	32.7	46.1	16.7	72.8	5.3	1.5	0.3	0.6	16.8
Lamond Murray	50	13	26.3	39.1	33.0	80.3	3.9	1.2	1.2	0.4	12.2
Eric Piatkowski	49	38	25.3	43.2	39.4	86.3	2.9	1.1	0.9	0.1	10.5
Tyrone Nesby	50	36	25.8	44.9	36.5	78.2	3.5	1.6	1.5	0.4	10.1
Michael Olowokandi	45	36	28.4	43.1	0.0	48.3	7.9	0.6	0.6	1.2	8.9
Sherman Douglas	30	19	28.1	43.8	0.0	63.2	1.9	4.1	0.9	0.1	8.2
Darrick Martin	37	25	25.4	36.7	29.2	80.3	1.3	3.9	1.2	0.1	8.0
James Robinson	14	0	20.0	39.8	26.7	74.1	1.9	1.3	1.0	0.2	7.6
Rodney Rogers	47	7	20.6	44.1	28.6	67.3	3.8	1.6	1.0	0.5	7.4
Troy Hudson	25	6	21.0	40.0	31.9	89.5	2.2	3.7	0.4	0.1	6.8
Lorenzen Wright	48	15	23.6	45.8	0.0	69.2	7.5	0.7	0.5	0.8	6.6
Brian Skinner	21	0	12.3	46.5	0.0	60.6	2.5	0.0	0.5	0.6	4.1
Charles Smith	23	10	13.8	36.1	21.2	43.8	1.0	0.6	0.7	0.6	3.7
Pooh Richardson	11	0	11.8	33.3	0.0	100.0	1.2	2.7	0.4	0.0	2.5
Keith Closs	15	0	5.8	52.2	0.0	80.0	1.7	0.0	0.2	0.6	2.1
Stojko Vrankovic	2	0	6.0	25.0	0.0	0.0	3.0	0.0	0.0	0.0	1.0

Player statistics citation:

== Injuries and surgeries ==
Player	Injury Date	Injury Type
Scott Brooks	January 30, 1999	Strained right MCL

== Transactions ==
The Clippers have been involved in the following transactions during the 1998–1999 season.

=== Re-signed ===
Player	Signed	Contract
Darrick Martin	January 22, 1999	One-year deal

=== Trades ===
No trades occurred for this team during this season.

=== Free agents ===
==== Additions ====
Player	Signed	Former team
Scott Brooks	January 21	Cleveland Cavaliers
Tyrone Nesby	January 21	Sioux Falls Skyforce (CBA)
Sherman Douglas	February 4	New Jersey Nets
Troy Hudson	March 23	Sioux Falls Skyforce (CBA)

==== Subtractions ====
Player	Left	New team
James Collins	free agency, July 1	LaCrosse Bobcats (CBA)
Isaac Austin	free agency, January 21	Orlando Magic
Loy Vaught	free agency, January 22	Detroit Pistons
Scott Brooks	waived, February 19	Los Angeles Stars (ABA)
James Robinson	waived, March 18	Minnesota Timberwolves

Player Transactions Citation:

== See also ==
- 1998-99 NBA season
