= 1998–99 Los Angeles Lakers season =

NBA professional basketball team season

- Head coach: Del Harris (fired); Bill Bertka (interim); Kurt Rambis
- General manager: Jerry West
- Owner: Jerry Buss
- Arena: Great Western Forum

Results
- Record: 31–19 (.620)
- Place: Division: 2nd (Pacific); Conference: 4th (Western)
- Playoff finish: Conference semifinals (lost to Spurs 0–4)
- Stats at Basketball Reference

Local media
- Television: KCAL-TV; Fox Sports West (Chick Hearn, Stu Lantz)
- Radio: KLAC (Chick Hearn, Stu Lantz)

The 1998–99 Los Angeles Lakers season was the 51st season for the Los Angeles Lakers in the National Basketball Association, and their 39th season in Los Angeles, California. Due to a lockout, the regular season began on February 5, 1999, and was cut from 82 games to 50.

== Season summary ==
=== Off-season ===
During the off-season, the team signed free agent Derek Harper, and re-acquired former Lakers center Travis Knight after one season with the Boston Celtics.

=== Regular season ===
With the addition of Harper, the Lakers played around .500 in winning percentage with a 6–6 start to the regular season, as head coach Del Harris was fired. After one game under interim coach Bill Bertka, the team hired former Lakers forward Kurt Rambis as their new coach. In February, the Lakers signed free agent and rebounding specialist Dennis Rodman, who was well known for winning NBA championships with the Detroit Pistons and the Chicago Bulls; however, after 23 games, Rodman was released by the team, averaging 11.2 rebounds per game. At mid-season, the team traded Eddie Jones, and Elden Campbell to the Charlotte Hornets in exchange for All-Star forward Glen Rice, J.R. Reid and B. J. Armstrong; Armstrong was released to free agency and signed with the Orlando Magic, while the team also released Corie Blount, as he later on signed with the Cleveland Cavaliers. The Lakers posted a 10-game winning streak between February and March, and finished in second place in the Pacific Division with a 31–19 record, earning the fourth seed in the Western Conference; the team qualified for the NBA playoffs for the fifth consecutive year.

Shaquille O'Neal averaged 26.3 points, 10.7 rebounds and 1.7 blocks per game, and was named to the All-NBA Second Team, while Kobe Bryant became the team's starting shooting guard, averaging 19.9 points, 5.3 rebounds, 3.8 assists and 1.4 steals per game, and was named to the All-NBA Third Team. In addition, Rice provided the team with 17.5 points per game in 27 games after the trade, while Rick Fox contributed 9.0 points per game off the bench, Harper provided with 6.9 points and 4.2 assists per game, and Derek Fisher contributed 5.9 points, 3.9 assists and 1.2 steals per game. Meanwhile, Reid averaged 5.0 points and 4.0 rebounds per game in 25 games, Robert Horry provided with 4.9 points and 4.0 rebounds per game, and Knight contributed 4.2 points and 3.5 rebounds per game.

O'Neal finished in sixth place in Most Valuable Player voting. The Lakers finished twelfth in the NBA in home-game attendance, with an attendance of 430,007 at the Great Western Forum during the regular season.

=== NBA playoffs ===
In the Western Conference First Round of the 1999 NBA playoffs, the Lakers faced off against the 5th–seeded Houston Rockets, who were led by the All-Star trio of Hakeem Olajuwon, Charles Barkley and Scottie Pippen. Despite both teams finishing with the same regular-season record, the Lakers had home-court advantage in the series. The Lakers won the first two games over the Rockets at home at the Great Western Forum, before losing Game 3 on the road, 102–88 at the Compaq Center. The Lakers won Game 4 over the Rockets on the road, 98–88 to win the series in four games.

In the Western Conference Semi-finals, the team faced off against the top–seeded, and Midwest Division champion San Antonio Spurs, who were led by All-Star forward Tim Duncan, All-Star center David Robinson, and Sean Elliott. The Lakers lost the first two games to the Spurs on the road at the Alamodome, and then lost the next two games at home, including a Game 4 loss to the Spurs at the Great Western Forum, 118–107, thus losing the series in a four-game sweep.

The Spurs would advance to the NBA Finals for the first time in franchise history, and defeat the 8th–seeded New York Knicks in five games in the 1999 NBA Finals, winning their first ever NBA championship.

=== Aftermath ===
This was also the Lakers' final season in which they played their home games at the Great Western Forum. Following the season, Rambis was fired as head coach, while Reid signed as a free agent with the Milwaukee Bucks, Sean Rooks was traded back to his former team, the Dallas Mavericks, rookie small forward Ruben Patterson signed with the Seattle SuperSonics, and Harper was dealt to the Detroit Pistons, but was released and then retired.

== Draft picks ==
Round	Pick	Player	Position	Nationality	College
1	26	Sam Jacobson	Guard	United States	Minnesota

== Roster ==
1998–99 Los Angeles Lakers roster
Players

Pos.	No.	Player	Height	Weight	DOB	From
G/F	8	Kobe Bryant	6 ft 6 in (1.98 m)	205 lb (93 kg)	1978–08–23	Lower Merion HS
G	2	Derek Fisher	6 ft 1 in (1.85 m)	210 lb (95 kg)	1974–08–09	Little Rock
F	17	Rick Fox	6 ft 7 in (2.01 m)	230 lb (104 kg)	1969–07–24	North Carolina
G	12	Derek Harper	6 ft 4 in (1.93 m)	185 lb (84 kg)	1961–10–13	Illinois
F	5	Robert Horry	6 ft 10 in (2.08 m)	240 lb (109 kg)	1970–08–25	Alabama
G	7	Sam Jacobson	6 ft 4 in (1.93 m)	215 lb (98 kg)	1975–07–22	Minnesota
F/C	40	Travis Knight	6 ft 10 in (2.08 m)	235 lb (107 kg)	1974–09–13	Connecticut
G	10	Tyronn Lue	6 ft 0 in (1.83 m)	175 lb (79 kg)	1977–05–03	Nebraska
C	34	Shaquille O'Neal	7 ft 1 in (2.16 m)	340 lb (154 kg)	1972–03–06	LSU
G/F	21	Ruben Patterson	6 ft 5 in (1.96 m)	224 lb (102 kg)	1975–07–31	Cincinnati
F/C	11	J. R. Reid	6 ft 9 in (2.06 m)	247 lb (112 kg)	1968–03–31	North Carolina
G/F	41	Glen Rice	6 ft 7 in (2.01 m)	215 lb (98 kg)	1967–05–28	Michigan
F/C	45	Sean Rooks	6 ft 10 in (2.08 m)	250 lb (113 kg)	1969–09–09	Arizona

Coaches
Head coach
- Del Harris (fired)
- Bill Bertka (interim)
- Kurt Rambis
Assistant(s)
- Bill Bertka
- Larry Drew
- Dave Wohl

Legend
- (DP) Unsigned draft pick
- (FA) Free agent
- (S) Suspended
- Injured

Roster
Updated: April 16, 1999

=== Roster Notes ===
- Power forward Dennis Rodman was waived on April 16, 1999.

== Regular season ==
The Lakers went through three coaches during the season: Del Harris (6–6), Bill Bertka (1–0) and Kurt Rambis (24–13). Fourteen different Lakers started at least one game during the season. From February 25 to March 12, the Lakers won ten consecutive games. Outside of the streak, the Lakers were 21–19 in all other games. During the season, over half of the Lakers' games were televised nationally.

At season's end, the Lakers ranked second in the league in scoring at 99.0 points per game (only Sacramento averaged more points: 100.2 ppg). Despite the high scoring, the Lakers were the fourth worst Free Throw shooting team in the league with a percentage of .683. Shaquille O'Neal had a percentage of .540. Following the season, Rambis was fired as coach.

=== Season standings ===
Pacific Division	W	L	PCT	GB	Home	Road	Div
y-Portland Trail Blazers	35	15	.700	–	22–3	13–12	15–7
x-Los Angeles Lakers	31	19	.620	4	18–7	13–12	14–8
x-Sacramento Kings	27	23	.540	8	16–9	11–14	11–9
x-Phoenix Suns	27	23	.540	8	15–10	12–13	9–10
Seattle SuperSonics	25	25	.500	10	17–8	8–17	11–10
Golden State Warriors	21	29	.420	14	13–12	8–17	8–11
Los Angeles Clippers	9	41	.180	26	6–19	3–22	3–16

#	Western Conference				
#	Team	W	L	PCT	GB
1	z-San Antonio Spurs	37	13	.740	–
2	y-Portland Trail Blazers	35	15	.700	2
3	x-Utah Jazz	37	13	.740	–
4	x-Los Angeles Lakers	31	19	.620	6
5	x-Houston Rockets	31	19	.620	6
6	x-Sacramento Kings	27	23	.540	10
7	x-Phoenix Suns	27	23	.540	10
8	x-Minnesota Timberwolves	25	25	.500	12
9	Seattle SuperSonics	25	25	.500	12
10	Golden State Warriors	21	29	.420	16
11	Dallas Mavericks	19	31	.380	18
12	Denver Nuggets	14	36	.280	23
13	Los Angeles Clippers	9	41	.180	28
14	Vancouver Grizzlies	8	42	.160	29

z – clinched division title
y – clinched division title
x – clinched playoff spot

== Game log ==
=== Preseason ===
1998 preseason game log
Total: 2–0 (home: 1–0; road: 1–0)
Preseason: 2–0 (home: 1–0; road: 1–0)

Game	Date	Team	Score	High points	High rebounds	High assists	Location Attendance	Record
1	January 29	L.A. Clippers	W 107-76	Kobe Bryant (19)	Travis Knight (14)	Fisher & Harper (6)	Great Western Forum; 14,042	1–0
2	January 30	@ L.A. Clippers	W 91-77	Kobe Bryant (16)	Knight & Rooks (8)	Derek Fisher (7)	Los Angeles Memorial Sports Arena; 16,021	2–0

1998–99 schedule

=== Regular season ===
1998–99 game log
Total: 31–19 (home: 18–7; road: 13–12)
February: 9–6 (home: 6–2; road: 3–4)

Game	Date	Team	Score	High points	High rebounds	High assists	Location Attendance	Record
1	February 5	Houston	W 99-91	Shaquille O'Neal (30)	Shaquille O'Neal (14)	Derek Harper (7)	Great Western Forum; 17,505	1–0
2	February 7	Utah	L 91-100	Shaquille O'Neal (37)	Shaquille O'Neal (14)	Derek Harper (6)	Great Western Forum; 17,505	1-1
3	February 8	@ San Antonio	W 80-75	Shaquille O'Neal (26)	Shaquille O'Neal (13)	Robert Horry (4)	Alamodome; 33,788	2–1
4	February 10	@ Denver	W 103-98	Shaquille O'Neal (29)	Kobe Bryant (10)	3 players tied (5)	McNichols Sports Arena; 13,210	3–1
5	February 11	@ Minnesota	L 75-86	Kobe Bryant (24)	Kobe Bryant (10)	Derek Harper (5)	Target Center; 19,006	3–2
6	February 14	Indiana	L 99-101	Shaquille O'Neal (36)	Shaquille O'Neal (17)	Derek Fisher (8)	Great Western Forum; 17,505	3-3
7	February 16	Charlotte	W 116-88	Fox & O'Neal (20)	Shaquille O'Neal (12)	4 players tied (5)	Staples Center; 14,093	4–3
8	February 17	Dallas	W 101-88	Shaquille O'Neal (24)	Shaquille O'Neal (12)	Derek Fisher (6)	Great Western Forum; 13,492	5–3
9	February 19	San Antonio	W 106-94	Shaquille O'Neal (28)	Shaquille O'Neal (10)	Bryant & Harper (6)	Great Western Forum; 17,505	6–3
10	February 21	@ Seattle	L 89-92	Shaquille O'Neal (27)	Kobe Bryant (13)	Derek Harper (5)	KeyArena; 17,072	6–4
11	February 22	@ Denver	L 113-117 (OT)	Shaquille O'Neal (28)	Kobe Bryant (13)	Kobe Bryant (9)	McNichols Sports Arena; 17,171	6–5
12	February 23	@ Vancouver	L 83-93	Shaquille O'Neal (26)	Shaquille O'Neal (10)	Shaquille O'Neal (7)	General Motors Place; 19,193	6-6
13	February 25	@ L.A. Clippers	W 115-100	Shaquille O'Neal (19)	Shaquille O'Neal (11)	Bryant & Fisher (6)	Arrowhead Pond; 18,456	7–6
14	February 26	L.A. Clippers	W 99-83	Kobe Bryant (22)	Dennis Rodman (11)	Fisher & Rodman (6)	Great Western Forum; 17,505	8–6
15	February 28	Houston	W 106-90	Shaquille O'Neal (22)	Dennis Rodman (10)	Bryant & Fisher (3)	Great Western Forum; 17,505	9–6

March: 12–5 (home: 6–2; road: 6–3)

Game	Date	Team	Score	High points	High rebounds	High assists	Location Attendance	Record
16	March 1	@ Phoenix	W 97-91	Shaquille O'Neal (25)	Dennis Rodman (16)	Fox & Jones (5)	American West Arena; 19,023	10–6
17	March 3	Phoenix	W 101-95	Kobe Bryant (32)	Dennis Rodman (17)	Bryant & Fisher (5)	Great Western Forum; 17,505	11–6
18	March 5	Seattle	W 103-100	Shaquille O'Neal (31)	Knight & O'Neal (11)	Shaquille O'Neal (7)	Great Western Forum; 17,505	12–6
19	March 7	@ Utah	W 97-89	Kobe Bryant (24)	Shaquille O'Neal (16)	Harper & Jones (4)	Delta Center; 19,911	13–6
20	March 9	@ L.A. Clippers	W 103-99	Shaquille O'Neal (31)	Dennis Rodman (20)	Kobe Bryant (5)	Los Angeles Memorial Sports Arena; 13,380	14–6
21	March 10	L.A. Clippers	W 94-75	Shaquille O'Neal 31	Shaquille O'Neal 13	Bryant & Fox (4)	Great Western Forum; 17,505	15–6
22	March 12	Golden State	W 89-78	Glen Rice (21)	Shaquille O'Neal (17)	Fisher & Fox (5)	Great Western Forum; 17,505	16–6
23	March 14	@ Sacramento	L 101-105	Shaquille O'Neal (33)	Shaquille O'Neal (11)	Derek Fisher (7)	ARCO Arena; 17,317	16–7
24	March 16	@ Minnesota	W 107-101	Shaquille O'Neal (24)	Kobe Bryant (9)	Derek Harper (6)	Target Center; 19,006	17–7
25	March 18	@ Cleveland	L 93-100	Shaquille O'Neal (37)	Shaquille O'Neal (19)	Bryant & Rice (5)	Gund Arena; 20,562	17–8
26	March 19	@ Philadelphia	L 90-105	Bryant & O'Neal (23)	Travis Knight (9)	Harper & Rice (3)	First Union Center; 20,644	17–9
27	March 21	@ Orlando	W 115-104	Kobe Bryant (38)	Shaquille O'Neal (13)	Derek Fisher (8)	Orlando Arena; 17,248	18–9
28	March 22	@ Dallas	W 96-93	Shaquille O'Neal (25)	Dennis Rodman (17)	Fisher & Fox (4)	Reunion Arena; 18,121	19–9
29	March 24	Phoenix	L 101-106	Kobe Bryant (25)	Dennis Rodman (13)	Derek Harper (7)	Great Western Forum; 17,505	19–10
30	March 26	Sacramento	L 109-111	Kobe Bryant (26)	Dennis Rodman (9)	Bryant & Fisher (6)	Great Western Forum; 17,505	19–11
31	March 28	New York	W 99-91	Kobe Bryant (29)	Dennis Rodman (12)	Derek Harper (9)	Great Western Forum; 17,505	20–11
32	March 29	Vancouver	W 116-98	Shaquille O'Neal (26)	Dennis Rodman (17)	Harper & Rice (6)	Great Western Forum; 17,312	21–11

April: 6–9 (home: 4–3; road: 2–6)

Game	Date	Team	Score	High points	High rebounds	High assists	Location Attendance	Record
33	April 2	@ Phoenix	W 91-90	Glen Rice (23)	Dennis Rodman (15)	Derek Harper (10)	American West Arena; 19,023	22–11
34	April 3	Golden State	L 76-81	Shaquille O'Neal (21)	Dennis Rodman (13)	Glen Rice (5)	Great Western Forum; 17,505	22–12
35	April 5	Denver	W 117-104	Bryant & Rice (26)	Dennis Rodman (17)	Derek Harper (9)	Great Western Forum; 17,505	23–12
36	April 6	Utah	L 93-106	Shaquille O'Neal (24)	Dennis Rodman (12)	Tyronn Lue (6)	Great Western Forum; 17,505	23–13
37	April 7	@ Sacramento	W 104-89	Shaquille O'Neal (30)	Shaquille O'Neal (18)	Kobe Bryant (7)	ARCO Arena; 17,317	24–13
38	April 9	Minnesota	W 96-89	O'Neal & Rice (25)	Shaquille O'Neal (15)	Kobe Bryant (7)	Great Western Forum; 17,505	25–13
39	April 11	Seattle	L 109-113	Shaquille O'Neal (38)	Dennis Rodman (13)	Kobe Bryant (9)	Great Western Forum; 17,505	25–14
40	April 13	@ Portland	L 86-113	Shaquille O'Neal (24)	Shaquille O'Neal (14)	Derek Fisher (7)	Rose Garden; 20,705	25–15
41	April 17	@ Utah	L 93-109	Shaquille O'Neal (29)	Shaquille O'Neal (14)	Derek Fisher (6)	Delta Center; 19,911	25–16
42	April 19	Vancouver	W 117-102	Shaquille O'Neal (35)	Robert Horry (12)	Kobe Bryant (8)	Great Western Forum; 17,505	26–16
43	April 20	@ Golden State	W 106-102 (OT)	Kobe Bryant (27)	Glen Rice (12)	Kobe Bryant (5)	The Arena in Oakland; 20,108	27–16
44	April 21	@ Portland	L 82-88	Shaquille O'Neal (25)	Shaquille O'Neal (13)	Kobe Bryant (4)	Rose Garden; 20,713	27–17
45	April 24	@ San Antonio	L 81-108	Shaquille O'Neal (26)	Shaquille O'Neal (12)	Derek Fisher (6)	Alamodome; 31,972	27–18
46	April 26	@ Houston	L 80-102	Shaquille O'Neal (19)	Shaquille O'Neal (12)	Derek Fisher (7)	Compaq Center; 16,285	27–19
47	April 29	Portland	W 108-89	Shaquille O'Neal (38)	Shaquille O'Neal (12)	Kobe Bryant (7)	Great Western Forum; 17,505	28–19

May: 3–0 (home: 1–0; road: 2–0)

Game	Date	Team	Score	High points	High rebounds	High assists	Location Attendance	Record
48	May 2	@ Seattle	W 91-84	Shaquille O'Neal (33)	Shaquille O'Neal (12)	Derek Fisher (6)	KeyArena; 17,072	29–19
49	May 3	Dallas	W 115-102	Shaquille O'Neal (26)	Shaquille O'Neal (11)	Kobe Bryant (10)	Great Western Forum; 17,505	30–19
50	May 5	Portland	W 119-91	Glen Rice (40)	Shaquille O'Neal (9)	Derek Fisher (8)	Great Western Forum; 17,505	31–19

1998–99 schedule

=== Playoffs ===
1999 playoff game log
Total: 3–5 (home: 2–2; road: 1–3)
First round: 3–1 (home: 2–0; road: 1–1)

Game	Date	Team	Score	High points	High rebounds	High assists	Location Attendance	Series
1	May 9	Houston	W 101–100	Glen Rice (29)	Shaquille O'Neal (11)	Derek Fisher (6)	Great Western Forum; 17,505	1–0
2	May 11	Houston	W 110–98	Shaquille O'Neal (28)	Robert Horry (10)	Shaquille O'Neal (7)	Great Western Forum; 17,505	2–0
3	May 13	@ Houston	L 88–102	Shaquille O'Neal (26)	Shaquille O'Neal (10)	Derek Fisher (6)	Compaq Center; 16,285	2–1
4	May 15	@ Houston	W 98–88	Shaquille O'Neal (37)	Shaquille O'Neal (11)	Kobe Bryant (8)	Compaq Center; 16,285	3–1

Conference Semi-finals: 0–4 (home: 0–2; road: 0–2)

Game	Date	Team	Score	High points	High rebounds	High assists	Location Attendance	Series
1	May 17	@ San Antonio	L 81–87	3 players tied (21)	Shaquille O'Neal (15)	Kobe Bryant (6)	Alamodome; 25,297	0–1
2	May 19	@ San Antonio	L 76–79	Kobe Bryant (28)	3 players tied (8)	Kobe Bryant (4)	Alamodome; 33,293	0–2
3	May 22	San Antonio	L 91–103	Glen Rice (24)	Shaquille O'Neal (15)	Derek Fisher (9)	Great Western Forum; 17,505	0–3
4	May 23	San Antonio	L 107–118	Shaquille O'Neal (36)	Shaquille O'Neal (14)	Fisher & Lue (6)	Great Western Forum; 17,505	0–4

1999 schedule

== Player stats ==
Legend
GP	Games played	GS	Games started	MPG	Minutes per game
FG%	Field-goal percentage	3P%	3-point field-goal percentage	FT%	Free-throw percentage
RPG	Rebounds per game	APG	Assists per game	SPG	Steals per game
BPG	Blocks per game	PPG	Points per game

=== Regular season ===
Player	GP	GS	MPG	FG%	3FG%	FT%	RPG	APG	SPG	BPG	PPG
Corie Blount	14	3	11.6	.394	.000	.500	3.3	.1	.1	.3	2.3
Kobe Bryant	50	50	37.9	.465	.267	.839	5.3	3.8	1.4	1.0	19.9
Elden Campbell	17	1	19.1	.436	.	.613	5.6	.5	.1	.9	7.4
Derek Fisher	50	21	22.6	.376	.392	.756	1.8	3.9	1.2	.0	5.9
Rick Fox	44	1	21.5	.448	.337	.742	2.0	2.0	.6	.2	9.0
Derek Harper	45	29	24.9	.412	.368	.813	1.5	4.2	1.0	.1	6.9
Robert Horry	38	5	19.6	.459	.444	.739	4.0	1.5	.9	1.0	4.9
Sam Jacobson	2	0	6.0	.600	.000	1.000	1.5	.0	.0	.0	4.0
Eddie Jones	20	20	36.2	.423	.313	.738	3.8	3.1	1.8	1.2	13.6
Travis Knight	37	23	14.2	.515	.000	.759	3.5	.8	.6	.7	4.2
Tyronn Lue	15	0	12.5	.431	.438	.571	.4	1.7	.3	.0	5.0
Shaquille O'Neal	49	49	34.8	.576	.000	.540	10.7	2.3	.7	1.7	26.3
Ruben Patterson	24	2	6.0	.412	.167	.710	1.3	.1	.2	.1	2.7
J. R. Reid	25	10	18.9	.407	.000	.717	4.0	.9	.6	.0	5.0
Glen Rice	27	25	36.5	.432	.393	.856	3.7	2.6	.6	.2	17.5
Dennis Rodman	23	11	28.6	.348	.000	.436	11.2	1.3	.4	.5	2.1
Sean Rooks	36	0	8.8	.405	.000	.708	2.0	.3	.1	.3	2.7

- Shaquille O'Neal averaged 26.3 ppg (2nd), 10.7 rpg (8th), and shot 57.6% (1st). For his efforts, he was named to the All-NBA second-team.
- Kobe Bryant had a career high 19.9 ppg and added 3.8 apg. He was recognized as an All-NBA third-team.
- Dennis Rodman played 23 games with the Lakers in 1999. He averaged 11.2 rebounds per game and the Lakers went 17–6 with Rodman in the lineup.
- Glen Rice played in 27 games with the club and averaged 17.5 points per game. With Rice in the lineup, the Lakers went 16–11

=== Playoffs ===
Player	GP	GS	MPG	FG%	3FG%	FT%	RPG	APG	SPG	BPG	PPG
Kobe Bryant	8	8	39.4	.430	.348	.800	6.9	4.6	1.9	1.3	19.8
Derek Fisher	8	8	29.8	.418	.345	.800	3.6	4.9	1.0	.0	9.8
Rick Fox	8	1	22.6	.400	.190	1.000	2.8	1.5	.5	.6	6.6
Derek Harper	7	0	16.1	.419	.100	.500	1.4	2.1	.3	.1	4.3
Robert Horry	8	0	22.1	.462	.417	.786	4.5	1.4	.8	.8	5.0
Travis Knight	3	0	3.3	.333	.	.500	1.7	.3	.0	.0	1.0
Tyronn Lue	3	0	11.0	.412	.000	.	.7	2.0	.7	.0	4.7
Shaquille O'Neal	8	8	39.4	.510	.	.466	11.6	2.3	.9	2.9	26.6
Ruben Patterson	3	0	1.7	.000	.	.	.0	.0	.0	.0	.0
J. R. Reid	8	8	22.3	.357	.	.750	5.3	.4	.5	.6	3.3
Glen Rice	7	7	43.9	.446	.357	.966	3.9	1.6	.7	.1	18.3
Sean Rooks	7	0	6.9	.333	.	.833	.3	.4	.0	.1	1.3

Player statistics citation:

== Awards and honors ==
- Kobe Bryant, All-NBA Third Team
- Shaquille O'Neal, All-NBA Second Team
