= 1998–99 Denver Nuggets season =

NBA professional basketball team season

- Head coach: Mike D'Antoni
- General manager: Dan Issel
- Arena: McNichols Sports Arena

Results
- Record: 14–36 (.280)
- Place: Division: 6th (Midwest); Conference: 13th (Western)
- Playoff finish: Did not qualify
- Stats at Basketball Reference

Local media
- Television: KPXC-TV; Fox Sports Rocky Mountain
- Radio: KKFN

The 1998–99 Denver Nuggets season was the 23rd season for the Denver Nuggets in the National Basketball Association, and their 32nd season as a franchise. Due to a lockout, the regular season began on February 5, 1999, and was cut from 82 games to 50.

== Season summary ==
=== Off-season ===
After finishing with the league's worst record at 11–71 the previous season, the Nuggets received the third overall pick the 1998 NBA draft, and selected center Raef LaFrentz from the University of Kansas. During the off-season, the team re-signed former Nuggets forward Antonio McDyess after one season with the Phoenix Suns, acquired All-Star guard Nick Van Exel from the Los Angeles Lakers on draft day, acquired second-year guard Chauncey Billups from the Toronto Raptors, and acquired second-year forward Johnny Taylor, and rookie power forward, and first-round draft pick Keon Clark out of the University of Nevada, Las Vegas from the Orlando Magic. The Nuggets also hired Mike D'Antoni as their new head coach.

=== Regular season ===
Under D'Antoni and despite the return of McDyess, along with the addition of LaFrentz, Van Exel and Billups, the Nuggets continued to struggle losing eight of their first nine games of the regular season. After twelve games, LaFrentz suffered a knee injury and was out for the remainder of the season, averaging 13.8 points, 7.6 rebounds and 1.4 blocks per game. Without their top draft pick, the Nuggets posted a seven-game losing streak in March, and lost their final seven games of the season, finishing in sixth place in the Midwest Division with a 14–36 record. The Nuggets had the worst team defensive rating in the NBA.

McDyess had a stellar season averaging 21.2 points, 10.7 rebounds, 1.5 steals and 2.3 blocks per game, and was named to the All-NBA Third Team, while Van Exel averaged 16.5 points and 7.4 assists per game, and contributed 72 three-point field goals, and Billups provided the team with 13.9 points, 3.8 assists and 1.3 steals per game, and also led them with 85 three-point field goals. In addition, second-year forward Danny Fortson stepped into the team's starting lineup in LaFrentz's absence, averaging 11.0 points and 11.6 rebounds per game, while Eric Williams and Cory Alexander both contributed 7.3 points per game, and Bryant Stith provided with 7.0 points per game. Meanwhile, Taylor averaged 5.8 points per game, second-year guard Eric Washington contributed 5.4 points per game, and Clark provided with 3.3 points, 3.4 rebounds and 1.1 blocks per game.

Fortson finished in fifth place in Most Improved Player voting, while McDyess finished tied in tenth place. The Nuggets finished 28th in the NBA in home-game attendance, with an attendance of 296,965 at the McNichols Sports Arena during the regular season, which was the second-lowest in the league;

=== Aftermath ===
This was also the Nuggets' final season in which they played their home games at the McNichols Sports Arena, before moving to the Pepsi Center the following season. Meanwhile, Fortson, Williams and Washington were all traded to the Boston Celtics, whom Williams previously played for, and D'Antoni was fired as head coach after only one season.

== Draft picks ==
Round	Pick	Player	Position	Nationality	School/Club team
1	3	Raef LaFrentz	PF/C	United States	Kansas
1	23	Tyronn Lue	PG	United States	Nebraska
2	54	Tremaine Fowlkes	SF	United States	Fresno State
2	55	Ryan Bowen	PF	United States	Iowa

== Roster ==
1998–99 Denver Nuggets roster
Players

Pos.	No.	Player	Height	Weight	DOB	From
G	7	Cory Alexander	6 ft 1 in (1.85 m)	185 lb (84 kg)	––	Virginia
G	4	Chauncey Billups	6 ft 3 in (1.91 m)	202 lb (92 kg)	––	Colorado
F/C	13	Keon Clark	6 ft 11 in (2.11 m)	220 lb (100 kg)	––	UNLV
F	15	Danny Fortson	6 ft 7 in (2.01 m)	260 lb (118 kg)	––	Cincinnati
F	21	Carl Herrera	6 ft 9 in (2.06 m)	215 lb (98 kg)	––	Houston
C	45	Raef LaFrentz	6 ft 11 in (2.11 m)	240 lb (109 kg)	––	Kansas
G	11	Kelly McCarty	6 ft 7 in (2.01 m)	200 lb (91 kg)	––	Southern Miss
F/C	24	Antonio McDyess	6 ft 9 in (2.06 m)	220 lb (100 kg)	––	Alabama
C	34	Loren Meyer	6 ft 10 in (2.08 m)	257 lb (117 kg)	––	Iowa State
G/F	23	Bryant Stith	6 ft 5 in (1.96 m)	208 lb (94 kg)	––	Virginia
F	17	Johnny Taylor	6 ft 9 in (2.06 m)	220 lb (100 kg)	––	Chattanooga
G	31	Nick Van Exel	6 ft 1 in (1.85 m)	170 lb (77 kg)	––	Cincinnati
G/F	14	Eric Washington	6 ft 4 in (1.93 m)	190 lb (86 kg)	––	Alabama
F	32	Eric Williams	6 ft 8 in (2.03 m)	220 lb (100 kg)	––	Providence

Coaches
Head coach
- Mike D'Antoni
Assistant(s)
- Louie Dampier
- Mike Evans
- Kim Hughes
- John Lucas

Legend
- (DP) Unsigned draft pick
- (FA) Free agent
- (S) Suspended
- Injured

Roster

=== Roster Notes ===
- Head coach Mike D'Antoni holds American and Italian dual citizenship; he played for the Italian national team although he was born in the United States.
- Rookie shooting guard Kelly McCarty holds American and Russian dual citizenship; he played for the Russian national team although he was born in the United States.

== Regular season ==
=== Season standings ===
Midwest Division	W	L	PCT	GB	Home	Road	Div
y-San Antonio Spurs	37	13	.740	–	21–4	16–9	17–4
x-Utah Jazz	37	13	.740	–	22–3	15–10	15–3
x-Houston Rockets	31	19	.620	6	19–6	12–13	12–9
x-Minnesota Timberwolves	25	25	.500	12	18–7	7–18	11–9
Dallas Mavericks	19	31	.380	18	15–10	4–21	8–12
Denver Nuggets	14	36	.280	23	12–13	2–23	5–16
Vancouver Grizzlies	8	42	.160	29	7–18	1–24	3–18

#	Western Conference				
#	Team	W	L	PCT	GB
1	z-San Antonio Spurs	37	13	.740	–
2	y-Portland Trail Blazers	35	15	.700	2
3	x-Utah Jazz	37	13	.740	–
4	x-Los Angeles Lakers	31	19	.620	6
5	x-Houston Rockets	31	19	.620	6
6	x-Sacramento Kings	27	23	.540	10
7	x-Phoenix Suns	27	23	.540	10
8	x-Minnesota Timberwolves	25	25	.500	12
9	Seattle SuperSonics	25	25	.500	12
10	Golden State Warriors	21	29	.420	16
11	Dallas Mavericks	19	31	.380	18
12	Denver Nuggets	14	36	.280	23
13	Los Angeles Clippers	9	41	.180	28
14	Vancouver Grizzlies	8	42	.160	29

z - clinched division title
y - clinched division title
x - clinched playoff spot

== Player statistics ==
Legend
GP	Games played	GS	Games started	MPG	Minutes per game
FG%	Field-goal percentage	3P%	3-point field-goal percentage	FT%	Free-throw percentage
RPG	Rebounds per game	APG	Assists per game	SPG	Steals per game
BPG	Blocks per game	PPG	Points per game

=== Regular season ===
Player	GP	GS	MPG	FG%	3FG%	FT%	RPG	APG	SPG	BPG	PPG
Antonio McDyess	50	50	38.7	.471	.111	.680	10.7	1.6	1.5	2.3	21.2
Nick Van Exel	50	50	36.0	.398	.308	.811	2.3	7.4	0.8	0.1	16.5
Chauncey Billups	45	41	33.1	.386	.362	.913	2.1	3.8	1.3	0.3	13.9
Raef LaFrentz	12	12	32.3	.457	.387	.750	7.6	0.7	0.8	1.4	13.8
Danny Fortson	50	38	28.3	.495	.000	.727	11.6	0.6	0.6	0.4	11.0
Cory Alexander	36	4	21.6	.373	.286	.841	2.1	3.3	1.0	0.1	7.3
Eric Williams	38	8	20.5	.365	.231	.799	2.1	1.0	0.7	0.2	7.3
Bryant Stith	46	32	26.0	.393	.292	.859	2.3	1.8	0.6	0.3	7.0
Johnny Taylor	36	9	20.1	.414	.382	.739	2.8	0.7	0.8	0.5	5.8
Eric Washington	38	6	20.0	.397	.381	.688	2.3	0.8	0.7	0.5	5.4
Tyson Wheeler	1	0	3.0	1.000	1.000	.500	0.0	2.0	0.0	0.0	4.0
Keon Clark	28	0	14.6	.450	.000	.568	3.4	0.4	0.4	1.1	3.3
Carl Herrera	24	0	11.0	.429	.000	.556	2.3	0.0	0.5	0.3	2.5
Kelly McCarty	2	0	2.0	.667			1.5	0.0	0.0	0.0	2.0
Loren Meyer	14	0	5.0	.250	.200	.500	1.1	0.1	0.0	0.2	1.1
Monty Williams	1	0	6.0	.000		.500	0.0	0.0	0.0	0.0	1.0

Player statistics citation:

== Awards and records ==
- Antonio McDyess, All-NBA Third Team

== See also ==
- 1998-99 NBA season
