= 1998–99 Houston Rockets season =

- Head coach: Rudy Tomjanovich
- General manager: Carroll Dawson
- Owner: Leslie Alexander
- Arena: Compaq Center

Results
- Record: 31–19 (.620)
- Place: Division: 3rd (Midwest); Conference: 5th (Western)
- Playoff finish: First round (lost to Lakers 1–3)
- Stats at Basketball Reference

Local media
- Television: KHWB; Fox Sports Southwest
- Radio: KTRH

The 1998–99 Houston Rockets season was the 32nd season for the Houston Rockets in the National Basketball Association and their 28th season in Houston, Texas. Due to a lockout, the regular season began on February 5, 1999, and was cut from 82 games to 50.

== Season summary ==
=== Off-season ===
The Rockets had three first-round draft picks in the 1998 NBA draft, selecting shooting guard Michael Dickerson from the University of Arizona with the 14th overall pick, point guard Bryce Drew out of Valparaiso University with the 16th overall pick, and power forward, and Turkish basketball star Mirsad Türkcan with the 18th overall pick; the team also drafted shooting guard Cuttino Mobley from the University of Rhode Island with the 41st overall pick in the second round. However, Türkcan never played for the Rockets, and was later on traded to the Philadelphia 76ers.

After the retirement of All-Star guard Clyde Drexler, the Rockets acquired All-Star forward, and six-time NBA champion Scottie Pippen from the Chicago Bulls, and signed free agent Antoine Carr, who previous had two NBA Finals appearances with the Utah Jazz. Pippen, Hakeem Olajuwon and Charles Barkley had previously played together on the U.S. Men's basketball team during the 1996 Summer Olympics in Atlanta, Georgia.

=== Regular season ===
With the addition of Pippen, the Rockets won six of their first eight games of the regular season, but then lost five of their next seven games. At mid-season, the team traded second-year guard Rodrick Rhodes to the Vancouver Grizzlies in exchange for three-point specialist, and former Rockets guard Sam Mack. The Rockets posted a nine-game winning streak in March, and finished in third place in the Midwest Division with a 31–19 record, earning the fifth seed in the Western Conference; the team qualified for the NBA playoffs for the seventh consecutive year. The Rockets also had the fifth best team offensive rating in the NBA.

Olajuwon averaged 18.9 points, 9.6 rebounds and 2.5 blocks per game, and was named to the All-NBA Third Team, while Barkley averaged 16.1 points, 12.3 rebounds and 4.6 assists per game, and Pippen provided the team with 14.5 points, 6.5 rebounds, 5.9 assists and 2.0 steals per game, and also led them with 72 three-point field goals. In addition, Dickerson provided with 10.9 points per game and 71 three-point field goals, while Mobley contributed 9.9 points per game, as both players were named to the NBA All-Rookie Second Team. Off the bench, Othella Harrington averaged 9.8 points and 6.4 rebounds per game, while Mack contributed 9.2 points per game in 25 games after the trade, and Brent Price provided with 7.3 points and 2.8 assists per game. Three-point specialist Matt Maloney only played just 15 games this season due to an elbow injury.

Olajuwon finished tied in 13th place in Most Valuable Player voting, while he and Pippen both finished tied in seventh place in Defensive Player of the Year voting, and Harrington finished tied in tenth place in Most Improved Player voting. The Rockets finished 18th in the NBA in home-game attendance, with an attendance of 407,125 at the Compaq Center during the regular season.

=== NBA playoffs ===
In the Western Conference First Round of the 1999 NBA playoffs, the Rockets faced off against the 4th–seeded Los Angeles Lakers, who were led by the All-Star trio of Shaquille O'Neal, Kobe Bryant and Glen Rice. Despite both teams finishing with the same regular-season record, the Lakers had home-court advantage in the series. The Rockets lost the first two games to the Lakers on the road at the Great Western Forum, but managed to win Game 3 at home, 102–88 at the Compaq Center; in Game 3, Pippen posted a double-double of 37 points and 13 rebounds, while Barkley had a double-double of 30 points and 23 rebounds. However, the Rockets lost Game 4 to the Lakers at home, 98–88, thus losing the series in four games.

The Rockets would not return to the NBA playoffs again until the 2003–04 season.

=== Aftermath ===
Pippen spent only one season with the Rockets, as he and Barkley had trouble getting along as teammates. Following the season, Pippen was traded to the Portland Trail Blazers, while Dickerson, Harrington, Carr and Price were all traded to the Vancouver Grizzlies, Mack and Maloney were both released to free agency, as Maloney signed as a free agent with the Chicago Bulls midway through the next season, and Eddie Johnson retired.

== Draft picks ==
Round	Pick	Player	Position	Nationality	College
1	14	Michael Dickerson	SG	United States	Arizona
1	16	Bryce Drew	PG	United States	Valparaiso
1	18	Mirsad Türkcan	PF	Turkey	Efes Pilsen
2	41	Cuttino Mobley	SG	United States	Rhode Island

== Roster ==
1998–99 Houston Rockets roster
Players

Pos.	No.	Player	Height	Weight	DOB	From
F	4	Charles Barkley	6 ft 6 in (1.98 m)	252 lb (114 kg)	1963–02–20	Auburn
F/C	50	Matt Bullard	6 ft 10 in (2.08 m)	215 lb (98 kg)	1967–06–05	Iowa
F/C	55	Antoine Carr	6 ft 9 in (2.06 m)	225 lb (102 kg)	1961–07–23	Wichita State
G	3	Michael Dickerson	6 ft 5 in (1.96 m)	190 lb (86 kg)	1975–06–25	Arizona
G	11	Bryce Drew	6 ft 2 in (1.88 m)	185 lb (84 kg)	1974–09–21	Valparaiso
F/C	32	Othella Harrington	6 ft 9 in (2.06 m)	235 lb (107 kg)	1974–01–31	Georgetown
F	8	Eddie Johnson	6 ft 7 in (2.01 m)	215 lb (98 kg)	1959–05–01	Illinois
G/F	7	Sam Mack	6 ft 7 in (2.01 m)	227 lb (103 kg)	1970–05–26	California
G	12	Matt Maloney	6 ft 3 in (1.91 m)	192 lb (87 kg)	1971–12–06	Penn
F/C	2	Anthony Miller	6 ft 9 in (2.06 m)	225 lb (102 kg)	1971–10–22	Michigan State
G	5	Cuttino Mobley	6 ft 4 in (1.93 m)	190 lb (86 kg)	1975–09–01	Rhode Island
C	34	Hakeem Olajuwon	7 ft 0 in (2.13 m)	255 lb (116 kg)	1963–01–21	Houston
F	33	Scottie Pippen	6 ft 8 in (2.03 m)	220 lb (100 kg)	1965–09–25	Central Arkansas
G	20	Brent Price	6 ft 1 in (1.85 m)	165 lb (75 kg)	1968–12–09	Oklahoma
C	53	Stanley Roberts	7 ft 0 in (2.13 m)	285 lb (129 kg)	1970–02–07	LSU

Coaches
Head coach
- Rudy Tomjanovich
Assistant(s)
- Bill Berry
- Jim Boylen
- Larry Smith

Legend
- (DP) Unsigned draft pick
- (FA) Free agent
- (S) Suspended
- Injured

Roster
Updated: March 11, 1999

== Regular season ==
=== Season standings ===
Midwest Division	W	L	PCT	GB	Home	Road	Div
y-San Antonio Spurs	37	13	.740	–	21–4	16–9	17–4
x-Utah Jazz	37	13	.740	–	22–3	15–10	15–3
x-Houston Rockets	31	19	.620	6	19–6	12–13	12–9
x-Minnesota Timberwolves	25	25	.500	12	18–7	7–18	11–9
Dallas Mavericks	19	31	.380	18	15–10	4–21	8–12
Denver Nuggets	14	36	.280	23	12–13	2–23	5–16
Vancouver Grizzlies	8	42	.160	29	7–18	1–24	3–18

#	Western Conference				
#	Team	W	L	PCT	GB
1	z-San Antonio Spurs	37	13	.740	–
2	y-Portland Trail Blazers	35	15	.700	2
3	x-Utah Jazz	37	13	.740	–
4	x-Los Angeles Lakers	31	19	.620	6
5	x-Houston Rockets	31	19	.620	6
6	x-Sacramento Kings	27	23	.540	10
7	x-Phoenix Suns	27	23	.540	10
8	x-Minnesota Timberwolves	25	25	.500	12
9	Seattle SuperSonics	25	25	.500	12
10	Golden State Warriors	21	29	.420	16
11	Dallas Mavericks	19	31	.380	18
12	Denver Nuggets	14	36	.280	23
13	Los Angeles Clippers	9	41	.180	28
14	Vancouver Grizzlies	8	42	.160	29

z – clinched division title
y – clinched division title
x – clinched playoff spot

=== Game log ===
Date	Opponent	Score	Result	Record
February 5	@ LA Lakers	91–99	Loss	0–1
February 6	@ Golden State	86–84	Win	1–1
February 8	Denver	99–80	Win	2–1
February 10	Sacramento	92–82	Win	3–1
February 11	@ Dallas	105–95	Win	4–1
February 16	Phoenix	109–92	Win	5–1
February 17	@ Minnesota	102–116	Loss	5–2
February 18	@ New Jersey	93-92 (OT)	Win	6–2
February 20	@ Miami	71–81	Loss	6–3
February 21	@ Orlando	83–109	Loss	6–4
February 23	Seattle	98–86	Win	7–4
February 25	Atlanta	87–93	Loss	7–5
February 27	@ Vancouver	86–74	Win	8–5
February 28	@ LA Lakers	90–106	Loss	8–6
March 2	San Antonio	82–99	Loss	8–7
March 4	LA Clippers	96–77	Win	9–7
March 6	@ Vancouver	107–92	Win	10–7
March 7	@ Portland	71–111	Loss	10–8
March 9	Denver	84–75	Win	11–8
March 11	Vancouver	102–91	Win	12–8
March 13	Cleveland	100–89	Win	13–8
March 14	@ Phoenix	90–104	Loss	13–9
March 16	Portland	101–93	Win	14–9
March 17	@ Denver	114–109	Win	15–9
March 20	Phoenix	103-93 (OT)	Win	16–9
March 22	Sacramento	110–100	Win	17–9
March 24	@ Dallas	88–78	Win	18–9
March 25	Toronto	113–104	Win	19–9
March 27	@ Golden State	87–86	Win	20–9
March 28	@ Sacramento	107–93	Win	21–9
March 30	@ LA Clippers	104–95	Win	22–9
April 1	@ Utah	87–88	Loss	22–10
April 4	@ Seattle	84–101	Loss	22–11
April 6	Golden State	111–74	Win	23–11
April 8	San Antonio	83–92	Loss	23–12
April 11	@ Utah	76–85	Loss	23–13
April 12	@ Minnesota	95–90	Win	24–13
April 14	Vancouver	102–85	Win	25–13
April 15	Portland	86–76	Win	26–13
April 18	@ San Antonio	83–86	Loss	26–14
April 19	Seattle	120–113	Win	27–14
April 21	Dallas	95–109	Loss	27–15
April 23	@ LA Clippers	101-106 (OT)	Loss	27–16
April 25	@ Phoenix	71–95	Loss	27–17
April 26	LA Lakers	102–80	Win	28–17
April 29	Dallas	81–91	Loss	28–18
April 30	Utah	78–91	Loss	28–19
May 2	LA Clippers	110–84	Win	29–19
May 4	Minnesota	100–83	Win	30–19
May 5	@ Denver	95–88	Win	31–19

== Playoffs ==
1999 playoff game log
First Round: 1–3 (home: 1–1; road: 0–2)

Game	Date	Team	Score	High points	High rebounds	High assists	Location Attendance	Series
1	May 9	@ L.A. Lakers	L 100–101	Charles Barkley (25)	Barkley, Pippen (10)	Scottie Pippen (8)	Great Western Forum; 17,505	0–1
2	May 11	@ L.A. Lakers	L 98–110	Sam Mack (20)	Charles Barkley (13)	Scottie Pippen (5)	Great Western Forum; 17,505	0–2
3	May 13	L.A. Lakers	W 102–88	Scottie Pippen (37)	Charles Barkley (23)	Brent Price (7)	Compaq Center; 16,285	1–2
4	May 15	L.A. Lakers	L 88–98	Charles Barkley (20)	Scottie Pippen (17)	Charles Barkley (6)	Compaq Center; 16,285	1–3

1999 schedule

== Player statistics ==
Legend
GP	Games played	GS	Games started	MPG	Minutes per game
FG%	Field-goal percentage	3P%	3-point field-goal percentage	FT%	Free-throw percentage
RPG	Rebounds per game	APG	Assists per game	SPG	Steals per game
BPG	Blocks per game	PPG	Points per game

=== Season ===
Player	GP	GS	MPG	FG%	3FG%	FT%	RPG	APG	SPG	BPG	PPG
Charles Barkley	42	40	36.3	.478	.160	.719	12.3	4.6	1.0	.3	16.1
Matt Bullard	41	0	10.1	.377	.387	.700	1.0	.4	.3	.1	2.9
Antoine Carr	18	0	8.4	.404	.000	.714	1.7	.5	.1	.6	2.6
Michael Dickerson	50	50	31.2	.465	.433	.639	1.7	1.9	.5	.2	10.9
Bryce Drew	34	0	13.0	.364	.327	1.000	.9	1.5	.4	.1	3.5
Othella Harrington	41	10	22.0	.513		.721	6.0	.4	.1	.6	9.8
Eddie Johnson	3	0	6.0	.462	.000		.7	.3	.0	.0	4.0
Sam Mack^{†}	25	0	20.2	.471	.405	.821	1.7	1.3	.6	.1	9.2
Matt Maloney	15	7	12.4	.179	.067	.909	.7	1.4	.3	.0	1.4
Anthony Miller	29	0	8.6	.467	.000	.636	2.3	.2	.2	.2	2.4
Cuttino Mobley	49	37	29.7	.425	.358	.818	2.3	2.5	.9	.5	9.9
Hakeem Olajuwon	50	50	35.7	.514	.308	.717	9.6	1.8	1.6	2.5	18.9
Scottie Pippen	50	50	40.2	.432	.340	.721	6.5	5.9	2.0	.7	14.5
Brent Price	40	6	20.2	.483	.411	.754	2.0	2.8	.8	.0	7.3
Rodrick Rhodes^{†}	3	0	11.0	.250		.833	1.3	.3	.3	.0	3.0
Stanley Roberts	6	0	5.5	.385		.500	1.8	.0	.0	.2	2.3

=== Playoffs ===
Player	GP	GS	MPG	FG%	3FG%	FT%	RPG	APG	SPG	BPG	PPG
Charles Barkley	4	4	39.3	.529	.286	.667	13.8	3.8	1.5	.5	23.5
Matt Bullard	2	0	4.0	1.000	1.000	1.000	.0	.5	.0	.0	3.5
Antoine Carr	4	0	9.3	.364			1.8	1.0	.0	.3	2.0
Michael Dickerson	4	4	20.5	.273	.375	.500	1.0	.8	.5	.8	4.3
Bryce Drew	1	0	4.0	1.000		.000	3.0	2.0	.0	.0	2.0
Othella Harrington	4	0	10.5	.643		.667	3.5	.3	.0	.3	5.5
Sam Mack	4	0	30.8	.342	.385	.824	2.3	1.8	1.0	.0	12.5
Cuttino Mobley	4	4	23.5	.467	.571	.909	1.0	2.8	.5	.0	7.0
Hakeem Olajuwon	4	4	30.8	.426		.875	7.3	.5	1.3	.8	13.3
Scottie Pippen	4	4	43.0	.329	.273	.808	11.8	5.5	1.8	.8	18.3
Brent Price	4	0	24.5	.458	.357	1.000	2.0	3.5	1.0	.3	8.3
Stanley Roberts	3	0	6.7	.000		.500	1.0	.0	.0	1.3	.3

Player statistics citation:

== Awards and records ==
=== Awards ===
- Hakeem Olajuwon, All-NBA Third Team
- Michael Dickerson, NBA All-Rookie Team Second Team
- Cuttino Mobley, NBA All-Rookie Team Second Team

== Transactions ==
=== Free agents ===
==== Additions ====
Player	Signed	Former team

==== Subtractions ====
Player	Left	New team

== See also ==
- 1998–99 NBA season
