= 1998–99 Minnesota Timberwolves season =

NBA professional basketball team season

- Head coach: Flip Saunders
- General manager: Kevin McHale
- Owner: Glen Taylor
- Arena: Target Center

Results
- Record: 25–25 (.500)
- Place: Division: 4th (Midwest); Conference: 8th (Western)
- Playoff finish: First round (lost to Spurs 1–3)
- Stats at Basketball Reference

Local media
- Television: KARE; KMWB; Midwest Sports Channel
- Radio: KFAN

The 1998–99 Minnesota Timberwolves season was the 10th season for the Minnesota Timberwolves in the National Basketball Association. Due to a lockout, the regular season began on February 5, 1999, and was cut from 82 games to 50.

== Season summary ==
=== Off-season ===
During the off-season, the Timberwolves signed free agents Joe Smith, and Malik Sealy, and acquired second-year guard Bobby Jackson, and former Timberwolves center Dean Garrett from the Denver Nuggets in a three-team trade.

For the season, the Timberwolves revealed new black alternate road uniforms, which featured green pine trees in the jersey trim and waistband; these uniforms would remain in use until 2008.

=== Regular season ===
With the addition of Smith, Sealy, Jackson and Garrett, the Timberwolves got off to a fast start by winning eight of their first ten games of the regular season. In a three-team mid-season trade, the team traded Stephon Marbury, and Chris Carr to the New Jersey Nets, and acquired All-Star guard Terrell Brandon from the Milwaukee Bucks, and also signed free agent and three-point specialist Dennis Scott, who was previously released by the New York Knicks. Despite the addition of Brandon, the Timberwolves played below .500 in winning percentage for the remainder of the season, and finished in fourth place in the Midwest Division with a 25–25 record, winning a tie-breaker for the eighth seed in the Western Conference over the Seattle SuperSonics, who finished with the same regular-season record, and qualifying for their third consecutive NBA playoff appearance.

Kevin Garnett averaged 20.8 points, 10.4 rebounds, 4.3 assists, 1.7 steals and 1.8 blocks per game, and was named to the All-NBA Third Team, while Brandon averaged 14.2 points, 9.8 assists and 1.9 steals per game in 21 games after the trade, and Smith provided the team with 13.7 points, 8.2 rebounds and 1.5 blocks per game. In addition, Sam Mitchell provided with 11.2 points per game, while Anthony Peeler contributed 9.6 points and 1.3 steals per game, but only 28 games due to a strained left calf injury. Off the bench, Sealy contributed 8.1 points per game in only 31 games, while Jackson provided with 7.1 points and 3.3 assists per game, Garrett, the team's starting center, averaged 5.5 points and 5.2 rebounds per game, and Tom Hammonds contributed 4.3 points and 2.8 rebounds per game.

Garnett finished in tenth place in Most Valuable Player voting, and also finished tied in seventh place in Defensive Player of the Year voting, while Smith finished in fourth place in Most Improved Player voting. The Timberwolves finished 13th in the NBA in home-game attendance, with an attendance of 427,974 at the Target Center during the regular season.

=== NBA playoffs ===
In the Western Conference First Round of the 1999 NBA playoffs, the Timberwolves faced off against the top–seeded, and Midwest Division champion San Antonio Spurs, who were led by All-Star forward Tim Duncan, All-Star center David Robinson, and Sean Elliott. The Timberwolves lost Game 1 to the Spurs on the road, 99–86 at the Alamodome, but managed to win Game 2 on the road, 80–71 to even the series. However, the Timberwolves lost the next two games at home, which included a Game 4 loss to the Spurs at the Target Center, 92–85, thus losing the series in four games.

The Spurs would advance to the NBA Finals for the first time in franchise history, and defeat the 8th–seeded New York Knicks in five games in the 1999 NBA Finals, winning their first ever NBA championship.

=== Aftermath ===
Following the season, Scott signed with the Vancouver Grizzlies.

== Draft picks ==
Round	Pick	Player	Position	Nationality	College
1	17	Rasho Nesterovič	C	Slovenia	Kinder Bologna (Italy)
2	46	Andrae Patterson	PF/C	United States	Indiana

== Roster ==
1998–99 Minnesota Timberwolves roster
Players

Pos.	No.	Player	Height	Weight	DOB	From
PG	7	Terrell Brandon	5 ft 11 in (1.80 m)	180 lb (82 kg)	1970–05–20	Oregon
PF	15	Bill Curley	6 ft 9 in (2.06 m)	220 lb (100 kg)	1972–05–29	Boston College
PF	21	Kevin Garnett	6 ft 11 in (2.11 m)	220 lb (100 kg)	1976–05–19	Farragut Academy (IL)
C	22	Dean Garrett	6 ft 10 in (2.08 m)	225 lb (102 kg)	1966–11–27	Indiana
PF	20	Tom Hammonds	6 ft 9 in (2.06 m)	215 lb (98 kg)	1967–03–27	Georgia Tech
PG	24	Bobby Jackson	6 ft 1 in (1.85 m)	185 lb (84 kg)	1973–03–13	Minnesota
SG	31	Reggie Jordan	6 ft 4 in (1.93 m)	195 lb (88 kg)	1968–01–26	New Mexico State
SF	42	Sam Mitchell	6 ft 6 in (1.98 m)	210 lb (95 kg)	1963–09–02	Mercer
C	8	Rasho Nesterović	7 ft 0 in (2.13 m)	255 lb (116 kg)	1976–05–30	Slovenia
PF	45	Andrae Patterson	6 ft 7 in (2.01 m)	238 lb (108 kg)	1975–11–12	Indiana
SG	1	Anthony Peeler	6 ft 4 in (1.93 m)	208 lb (94 kg)	1969–11–25	Missouri
PG	26	James Robinson	6 ft 2 in (1.88 m)	180 lb (82 kg)	1970–08–31	Alabama
SF	3	Dennis Scott	6 ft 8 in (2.03 m)	229 lb (104 kg)	1968–09–05	Georgia Tech
SF	2	Malik Sealy	6 ft 8 in (2.03 m)	200 lb (91 kg)	1970–02–01	St. John's
C	32	Joe Smith	6 ft 10 in (2.08 m)	225 lb (102 kg)	1975–07–26	Maryland

Coaches
Head coach
- Flip Saunders
Assistant(s)
- Greg Ballard
- Jerry Sichting
- Randy Wittman

Legend
- (DP) Unsigned draft pick
- (FA) Free agent
- (S) Suspended
- Injured

Roster
Updated: May 4, 1999

== Regular season ==
=== Season standings ===
Midwest Division	W	L	PCT	GB	Home	Road	Div
y-San Antonio Spurs	37	13	.740	–	21–4	16–9	17–4
x-Utah Jazz	37	13	.740	–	22–3	15–10	15–3
x-Houston Rockets	31	19	.620	6	19–6	12–13	12–9
x-Minnesota Timberwolves	25	25	.500	12	18–7	7–18	11–9
Dallas Mavericks	19	31	.380	18	15–10	4–21	8–12
Denver Nuggets	14	36	.280	23	12–13	2–23	5–16
Vancouver Grizzlies	8	42	.160	29	7–18	1–24	3–18

#	Western Conference				
#	Team	W	L	PCT	GB
1	z-San Antonio Spurs	37	13	.740	–
2	y-Portland Trail Blazers	35	15	.700	2
3	x-Utah Jazz	37	13	.740	–
4	x-Los Angeles Lakers	31	19	.620	6
5	x-Houston Rockets	31	19	.620	6
6	x-Sacramento Kings	27	23	.540	10
7	x-Phoenix Suns	27	23	.540	10
8	x-Minnesota Timberwolves	25	25	.500	12
9	Seattle SuperSonics	25	25	.500	12
10	Golden State Warriors	21	29	.420	16
11	Dallas Mavericks	19	31	.380	18
12	Denver Nuggets	14	36	.280	23
13	Los Angeles Clippers	9	41	.180	28
14	Vancouver Grizzlies	8	42	.160	29

z - clinched division title
y - clinched division title
x - clinched playoff spot

== Playoffs ==
1999 playoff game log
First Round: 1–3 (home: 0–2; road: 1–1)

Game	Date	Team	Score	High points	High rebounds	High assists	Location Attendance	Series
1	May 9	@ San Antonio	L 86–99	Kevin Garnett (21)	Brandon, Garnett (8)	Terrell Brandon (11)	Alamodome; 22,356	0–1
2	May 11	@ San Antonio	W 80–71	Kevin Garnett (23)	Kevin Garnett (12)	Terrell Brandon (9)	Alamodome; 22,494	1–1
3	May 13	San Antonio	L 71–85	Kevin Garnett (23)	Kevin Garnett (12)	three players tied (2)	Target Center; 17,444	1–2
4	May 15	San Antonio	L 85–92	Terrell Brandon (27)	Kevin Garnett (6)	Brandon, Garnett (6)	Target Center; 15,898	1–3

1999 schedule

== Player statistics ==
=== Regular season ===
Player	POS	GP	GS	MP	REB	AST	STL	BLK	PTS	MPG	RPG	APG	SPG	BPG	PPG
Sam Mitchell	SF	50	20	1,344	182	98	35	16	561	26.9	3.6	2.0	.7	.3	11.2
Bobby Jackson	PG	50	12	941	135	167	39	3	353	18.8	2.7	3.3	.8	.1	7.1
Dean Garrett	C	49	37	1,054	257	28	30	45	270	21.5	5.2	.6	.6	.9	5.5
Tom Hammonds	PF	49	0	716	136	20	8	7	212	14.6	2.8	.4	.2	.1	4.3
Kevin Garnett	PF	47	47	1,780	489	202	78	83	977	37.9	10.4	4.3	1.7	1.8	20.8
Joe Smith	C	43	42	1,418	354	68	32	66	588	33.0	8.2	1.6	.7	1.5	13.7
Bill Curley	PF	35	7	372	51	14	17	9	78	10.6	1.5	.4	.5	.3	2.2
Andrae Patterson	PF	35	0	284	65	15	19	7	114	8.1	1.9	.4	.5	.2	3.3
Malik Sealy	SF	31	7	731	92	36	30	5	251	23.6	3.0	1.2	1.0	.2	8.1
Anthony Peeler	SG	28	28	810	84	78	35	6	270	28.9	3.0	2.8	1.3	.2	9.6
Reggie Jordan	SG	27	1	296	59	41	12	5	51	11.0	2.2	1.5	.4	.2	1.9
Terrell Brandon^{†}	PG	21	20	712	81	205	39	7	298	33.9	3.9	9.8	1.9	.3	14.2
Dennis Scott^{†}	SF	21	9	532	38	32	12	2	191	25.3	1.8	1.5	.6	.1	9.1
Stephon Marbury^{†}	PG	18	18	661	62	167	29	5	319	36.7	3.4	9.3	1.6	.3	17.7
James Robinson^{†}	PG	17	0	226	35	38	8	5	77	13.3	2.1	2.2	.5	.3	4.5
Chris Carr^{†}	SG	11	2	81	12	7	1	1	23	7.4	1.1	.6	.1	.1	2.1
Brian Evans^{†}	SF	5	0	24	2	1	2	0	4	4.8	.4	.2	.4	.0	.8
Paul Grant^{†}	C	4	0	8	1	0	0	0	2	2.0	.3	.0	.0	.0	.5
Rasho Nesterović	C	2	0	30	8	1	0	0	8	15.0	4.0	.5	.0	.0	4.0
Trevor Winter	C	1	0	5	3	0	0	0	0	5.0	3.0	.0	.0	.0	.0

- ^{†} Denotes player spent time with another team in the season. Stats reflect time with the Timberwolves only.

=== Playoffs ===
Player	POS	GP	GS	MP	REB	AST	STL	BLK	PTS	MPG	RPG	APG	SPG	BPG	PPG
Kevin Garnett	PF	4	4	170	48	15	7	8	87	42.5	12.0	3.8	1.8	2.0	21.8
Terrell Brandon	PG	4	4	161	30	28	9	2	77	40.3	7.5	7.0	2.3	.5	19.3
Anthony Peeler	SG	4	4	125	16	6	4	0	27	31.3	4.0	1.5	1.0	.0	6.8
Joe Smith	C	4	4	120	26	5	2	8	30	30.0	6.5	1.3	.5	2.0	7.5
Dean Garrett	C	4	3	92	16	5	2	3	22	23.0	4.0	1.3	.5	.8	5.5
Sam Mitchell	SF	4	1	131	14	6	1	2	40	32.8	3.5	1.5	.3	.5	10.0
Malik Sealy	SF	4	0	70	6	3	1	1	20	17.5	1.5	.8	.3	.3	5.0
Bobby Jackson	PG	4	0	27	4	2	0	0	4	6.8	1.0	.5	.0	.0	1.0
Tom Hammonds	PF	4	0	18	2	0	0	0	4	4.5	.5	.0	.0	.0	1.0
James Robinson	PG	4	0	10	1	0	0	0	3	2.5	.3	.0	.0	.0	.8
Rasho Nesterović	C	3	0	29	7	3	0	0	8	9.7	2.3	1.0	.0	.0	2.7
Andrae Patterson	PF	2	0	7	4	2	0	0	0	3.5	2.0	1.0	.0	.0	.0

== Awards and records ==
- Kevin Garnett, All-NBA Third Team

== See also ==
- 1998-99 NBA season
