= Jim Jackson (basketball) =

American basketball player (born 1970)

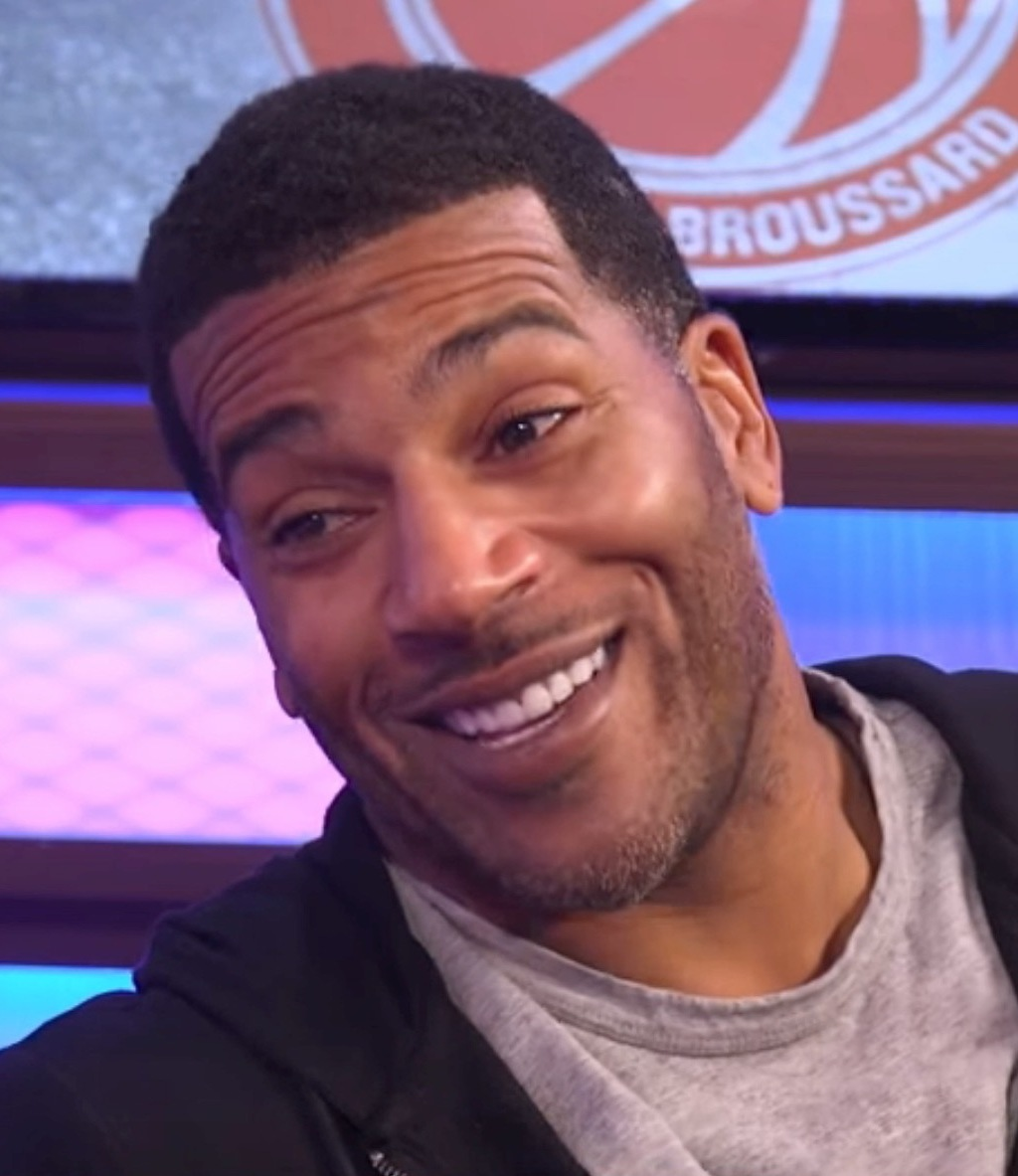
- Jackson in 2018

Personal information
- Born: October 14, 1970 (age 56) Toledo, Ohio, U.S.
- Listed height: 6 ft 6 in (1.98 m)
- Listed weight: 220 lb (100 kg)

Career information
- High school: Macomber (Toledo, Ohio)
- College: Ohio State (1989–1992)
- NBA draft: 1992: 1st round, 4th overall pick
- Drafted by: Dallas Mavericks
- Playing career: 1992–2006
- Position: Shooting guard / small forward
- Number: 24, 22, 19, 2, 21

Career history
- 1992–1997: Dallas Mavericks
- 1997: New Jersey Nets
- 1997–1998: Philadelphia 76ers
- 1998: Golden State Warriors
- 1999: Portland Trail Blazers
- 1999–2001: Atlanta Hawks
- 2001: Cleveland Cavaliers
- 2001–2002: Miami Heat
- 2002–2003: Sacramento Kings
- 2003–2004: Houston Rockets
- 2005–2006: Phoenix Suns
- 2006: Los Angeles Lakers

Career highlights
- UPI College Player of the Year (1992); 2× Consensus first-team All-American (1991, 1992); 2× Big Ten Player of the Year (1991, 1992); 2× First-team All-Big Ten (1991, 1992); Big Ten Freshman of the Year (1990); No. 22 retired by Ohio State Buckeyes; McDonald's All-American (1989); 2× First-team Parade All-American (1988, 1989); 2× Ohio Mr. Basketball (1988, 1989)

Career NBA statistics
- Points: 12,690 (14.3 ppg)
- Rebounds: 4,152 (4.7 rpg)
- Assists: 2,851 (3.2 apg)
- Stats at NBA.com
- Stats at Basketball Reference
- Collegiate Basketball Hall of Fame
Medals
Men's basketball
Representing the United States
Pan American Games
Bronze medal – third place	1991 Havana	Team competition

James Arthur Jackson (born October 14, 1970) is an American former professional basketball player. Over his 14 National Basketball Association (NBA) seasons, Jackson was on the active roster of a then-record 12 different NBA teams. He is currently a basketball analyst for Fox Sports, Turner Sports and the Los Angeles Clippers on Bally Sports West, having previously worked for the Big Ten Network. Jim Jackson also works as an analyst for the NBA Playoffs on NBATV.

== High school career ==
Jackson was a 6-foot-6-inch (198 cm), 220-pound (100 kg) shooting guard who started all four years at Macomber High School in Toledo, Ohio. The former McDonald's All American led Macomber to the 1989 Division I state championship over Cleveland St. Joseph. He was high school teammates with former NFL safety Myron Bell.

== College career ==
Jackson was a member of the Ohio State Buckeyes. He instantly contributed, starting as a freshman for the 1989–90 season and averaging 16.1 points and 5.5 rebounds per game while shooting 49.9% from the field. He played two more seasons through the 1991–92 season, earning consensus First Team All American honors in 1991 and 1992 UPI college basketball, the UPI player of the year, and winning the Big Ten Championship in 1992.

Jackson's number (22) was retired at Ohio State in February 2001.

== NBA career ==
=== Dallas Mavericks ===
Jackson skipped his final year of college eligibility and was drafted by the Dallas Mavericks with the fourth overall pick of the 1992 NBA draft after his junior season at OSU.

Jackson's rookie year was abbreviated due to a lengthy contract dispute where he held out for most of the season. As a result, he appeared in only 28 games in his first season in the league. He started in all 82 games the following season, averaging 19.2 points, 4.8 rebounds, and 4.6 assists in 37.4 minutes per game. With the drafting of Jamal Mashburn and Jason Kidd in the following two seasons, the trio was nicknamed the "Three J's".

During the 1994–95 season, Jackson averaged 25.7 points and 5.1 rebounds, finishing fifth in the NBA in scoring. However, he suffered an ankle injury after 51 games that year. He came back to average 19.6 points in 1995–96. However, controversy surrounded the Mavericks as a rift between Jason Kidd and Jackson emerged; unsubstantiated rumors pointed to a love triangle between Kidd, Jackson, and singer Toni Braxton. In the middle of the 1996–97 season, Jackson was traded to the New Jersey Nets along with Sam Cassell, Eric Montross, George McCloud, and Chris Gatling for Shawn Bradley, Ed O'Bannon, Robert Pack, and Khalid Reeves.

=== New Jersey Nets ===
Jackson played and started in only 31 games with the Nets to finish the 1996–97 season averaging 16.5 points and 5.9 rebounds per game with them.

The following offseason, the Nets coveted a college prospect, forward Keith Van Horn out of Utah. In a bidding war with the Chicago Bulls among other teams, they traded Jackson along with Eric Montross and their two first-round picks, Tim Thomas and Anthony Parker, to the Philadelphia 76ers for Michael Cage, Don MacLean, Lucious Harris, and the rights to Van Horn, the second overall pick in the 1997 draft.

=== Philadelphia 76ers ===
Jackson played in 48 games for the 76ers in the 1997–98 season averaging 13.7 points and 4.7 rebounds per game with decreased minutes from previous seasons. Jackson was reported to be unhappy with his reduced role and shooting while playing with Allen Iverson, who was viewed as the 76ers' franchise player.

In the middle of the 1997–98 season, the 76ers traded Jackson along with Clarence Weatherspoon to the Golden State Warriors for Joe Smith and Brian Shaw. All four players were free agents at the end of the season, with the 76ers fearing an inability to re-sign Jackson and the Warriors fearing an inability to re-sign Smith.

=== Golden State Warriors ===
Although Jackson saw an increased role as the Warriors' starting shooting guard, averaging 18.9 points, 5.6 rebounds, and 40.6 minutes per game for the remainder of the 1997–98 season, he disliked playing for a losing franchise. In the offseason, Jackson signed with the Portland Trail Blazers.

=== Portland Trail Blazers ===
Jackson was limited in the 1998–99 season with numerous injuries. He averaged 8.4 points and 2.6 rebounds in 24 minutes per game, statistical career lows for him at that time.

Despite having talent and depth, the Trail Blazers were plagued by injuries, attitude problems on the court, and legal problems off the court. In an effort to clean up their image and team chemistry in the 1999 offseason, the Trail Blazers traded or chose not to re-sign many of their players. Jackson, and talented but troubled Isaiah Rider were both traded to the Atlanta Hawks for Steve Smith and Ed Gray.

=== Atlanta Hawks ===
For the 1999–2000 season, Jackson played in 79 games for the Hawks averaging 16.8 points and 5 rebounds per 35 minutes. Jackson suited up for only 17 games for the Hawks in the 2000–01 season.

After voicing his displeasure with losing, Jackson was traded with Larry Robinson and Anthony Johnson in January 2001 to the Cleveland Cavaliers for Brevin Knight.

=== Cleveland Cavaliers ===
Hailing from nearby Toledo and a product of Ohio State, Jackson's trade to the Cavaliers was viewed as a homecoming of sorts. Additionally, Jackson was happy to be part of a team that, as an early-season success story, was eyeing the playoffs for the 2000–01 season despite a run of injuries to a number of key players. Playing in 39 games and starting only 26 of them, Jackson's statistics for the Cavaliers were modest, 10.3 points and 3.7 rebounds in only 29.2 minutes per game. The Cavaliers went on to finish 30–52 and miss the playoffs that season. Jackson did not receive an offer from the Cavaliers or any other team in the following offseason.

=== Miami Heat ===
At the start of 2001–02 season, Jackson did not have a team, but signed with the Miami Heat in December 2001. The Heat, already with a shallow bench, signed Jackson to mitigate the effects of injuries to key players. Jackson averaged 10.7 points and 5.3 rebounds in 33.2 minutes per game, appearing as a starter in some games as injuries warranted. Again, Jackson did not receive an offer from Miami or any other team in the following offseason.

=== Sacramento Kings ===
For the start of 2002–03 season, Jackson again did not have a team. For the second straight season, he did not play in the month of November. Jackson eventually signed with the Sacramento Kings in December 2002 to bolster their bench. In 63 games off the bench, Jackson averaged 7.7 points and 4.1 rebounds in only 20.8 minutes per game; however, he played well during crucial moments of games, eventually unseating Hedo Türkoğlu as the sixth man on the team. Jackson saw his stock rise, and as a free agent, received a two-year offer from the Houston Rockets the following offseason.

=== Houston Rockets/New Orleans Hornets ===
Jackson played in 80 games for the 2003–04 season, starting in all of them. He averaged 12.9 points and 6.1 rebounds in 39 minutes per game. He returned for the 2004–05 season, again putting up decent statistics as a starter for the first 24 games.

Despite averaging 13.3 points and 4.8 rebounds in 41.3 minutes per game, the Rockets dealt Jackson along with Boštjan Nachbar to the New Orleans Hornets for David Wesley. Although Hornets general manager Allan Bristow looked forward to the additions of Nachbar and Jackson, Jackson refused to report to the Hornets, an act for which he was suspended. Without ever appearing in a Hornets uniform, Jackson was traded to the Phoenix Suns for Maciej Lampe, Casey Jacobsen, and Jackson Vroman.

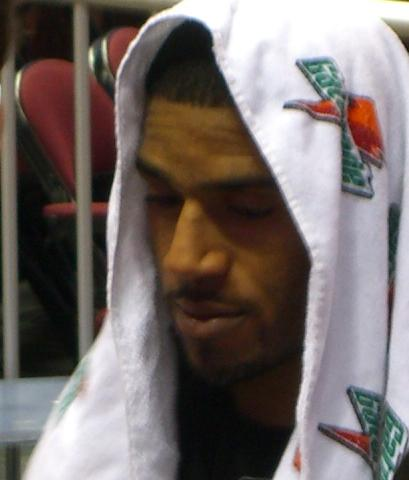
Jackson before a game during the 2005–06 NBA season

=== Phoenix Suns ===
Jackson finished the 2004–05 season with the Suns averaging a modest 8.8 points and 3.9 rebounds per 24.9 minutes per game. With starting shooting guard Joe Johnson injured, Jackson stepped up his play in the postseason, helping Phoenix reach the Western Conference final. Although re-signed in the following offseason, Jackson was waived at the beginning of March 2006 after spending nearly two months on the bench without playing any minutes. Jackson averaged career lows of 3.7 points and 2.4 rebounds per 15.6 minutes in 27 games. Immediately after being waived, Jackson was claimed by the Los Angeles Lakers.

=== Los Angeles Lakers ===
Jackson finished the 2005–06 season with the Lakers, playing in only 13 games with averages of 1.7 points and .9 rebounds per 7 minutes. Jackson did not receive an offer to sign with any team in the following offseason, marking the end of his career. He was the last player on the Lakers to wear #24 before Kobe Bryant.

== NBA career statistics ==
Legend
GP	Games played	GS	Games started	MPG	Minutes per game
FG%	Field goal percentage	3P%	3-point field goal percentage	FT%	Free throw percentage
RPG	Rebounds per game	APG	Assists per game	SPG	Steals per game
BPG	Blocks per game	PPG	Points per game	**Bold**	Career high
*	Led the league

=== Regular season ===
Year	Team	GP	GS	MPG	FG%	3P%	FT%	RPG	APG	SPG	BPG	PPG
1992–93	Dallas	28	28	33.5	.395	.288	.739	4.4	4.7	**1.4**	.4	16.3
1993–94	Dallas	**82**	**82**	37.4	.445	.283	.821	4.7	4.6	1.1	.3	19.2
1994–95	Dallas	51	51	38.9	**.472**	.318	.805	5.1	3.7	.5	.2	**25.7**
1995–96	Dallas	**82**	**82***	34.4	.435	.363	.825	5.0	2.9	.6	.3	19.6
1996–97	Dallas	46	45	36.4	.442	.331	.787	4.9	3.4	1.2	.3	15.5
1996–97	New Jersey	31	31	37.3	.417	.370	.852	5.9	**5.2**	.9	**.5**	16.5
1997–98	Philadelphia	48	47	37.3	.460	.348	.818	4.7	4.6	.9	.1	13.7
1997–98	Golden State	31	31	40.6	.402	.278	.805	5.6	5.1	1.2	.1	18.9
1998–99	Portland	49	9	24.0	.411	.278	.842	3.2	2.6	.9	.1	8.4
1999–00	Atlanta	79	76	35.0	.411	.386	.877	5.0	2.9	.7	.1	16.7
2000–01	Atlanta	17	14	32.4	.355	.421	.859	4.6	2.9	1.1	.2	14.3
2000–01	Cleveland	39	26	29.2	.390	.238	.786	3.7	2.9	.9	.2	10.3
2001–02	Miami	55	19	33.2	.442	**.469**	.862	5.3	2.5	.8	.3	10.7
2002–03	Sacramento	63	0	20.8	.442	.451	.855	4.2	1.9	.5	.1	7.7
2003–04	Houston	80	80	39.0	.424	.400	.843	**6.1**	2.8	1.1	.3	12.9
2004–05	Houston	24	24	**41.3**	.417	.367	.909	4.8	3.6	1.0	.0	13.3
2004–05	Phoenix	40	3	24.9	.435	.459	**.960**	3.9	2.4	.3	.1	8.8
2005–06	Phoenix	27	1	15.6	.295	.222	.692	2.4	1.1	.4	.2	3.7
2005–06	L.A. Lakers	13	0	7.1	.290	.364	–	.9	.3	.2	.0	1.7
Career		885	649	32.8	.428	.365	.825	4.7	3.2	.8	.2	14.3

=== Playoffs ===
Year	Team	GP	GS	MPG	FG%	3P%	FT%	RPG	APG	SPG	BPG	PPG
1999	Portland	13	0	20.4	.361	.278	**.905**	2.3	1.5	.5	.1	7.3
2003	Sacramento	12	0	24.7	**.500**	.464	.774	3.9	1.2	.7	.3	11.3
2004	Houston	5	5	**44.2**	.397	.276	.667	**10.4**	**2.0**	**1.0**	.2	**14.8**
2005	Phoenix	**15**	**6**	31.6	.488	**.516**	.875	4.1	1.5	.7	**.5**	11.0
2006	L.A. Lakers	3	0	7.1	.333	.000	–	1.0	.7	.3	.3	1.3
Career		48	11	26.6	.447	.420	.828	4.0	1.4	.6	.3	9.9

== Personal life ==
During much of his career, Jackson wore a sweatband on his arm with the numbers "419" (which refer to the North American telephone area code 419 that serves Toledo and most of northwest Ohio) to represent where he is from. His son Traevon Jackson played the point guard position for Wisconsin from 2011 to 2015, reaching two Final Fours.
