= 1998–99 Portland Trail Blazers season =

NBA professional basketball team season

- Division champions
- Head coach: Mike Dunleavy
- President: Bob Whitsitt
- General manager: Bob Whitsitt
- Owner: Paul Allen
- Arena: Rose Garden Arena

Results
- Record: 35–15 (.700)
- Place: Division: 1st (Pacific); Conference: 2nd (Western)
- Playoff finish: Conference finals (lost to Spurs 0–4)
- Stats at Basketball Reference

Local media
- Television: KGW; Fox Sports Northwest (Eddie Doucette, Steve "Snapper" Jones)
- Radio: KXL

The 1998–99 Portland Trail Blazers season was the 29th season for the Portland Trail Blazers in the National Basketball Association. Due to a lockout, the regular season began on February 5, 1999, and was cut from 82 games to 50.

== Season summary ==
=== Off-season ===
During the off-season, the Trail Blazers signed free agents Jim Jackson and Greg Anthony, who would reunite with his former University of Nevada, Las Vegas teammate Stacey Augmon, and acquired rookie shooting guard, and first-round draft pick Bonzi Wells out of Ball State University from the Detroit Pistons, who selected him with the eleventh overall pick in the 1998 NBA draft.

=== Regular season ===
With the addition of Jackson and Anthony, the Trail Blazers got off to a fast start by winning seven of their first nine games of the regular season. The team posted an eight-game winning streak between February and March, and then posted a six-game winning streak in March, which led to a 27–6 start to the season. Despite losing four of their final five games of the season, the Trail Blazers finished in first place in the Pacific Division with a 35–15 record, and earned the second seed in the Western Conference. The Trail Blazers won their fourth Division title in franchise history, and their first since the 1991–92 season; the team qualified for the NBA playoffs for the 17th consecutive year, and also for the 22nd time in 23 years. Head coach Mike Dunleavy was named the NBA Coach of the Year.

Isaiah Rider led the Trail Blazers in scoring with a low team-high average of 13.9 points per game, while Rasheed Wallace played half the season off the bench, averaging 12.8 points and 4.9 rebounds per game, and Damon Stoudamire provided the team with 12.6 points and 6.2 assists per game. In addition, Brian Grant contributed 11.5 points and 9.8 rebounds per game, while Arvydas Sabonis provided with 12.1 points, 7.9 rebounds and 1.3 blocks per game. Meanwhile, Walt Williams contributed 9.3 points per game, Jackson averaged 8.4 points per game, Anthony contributed 6.4 points per game, and Augmon provided with 4.3 points and 1.2 steals per game.

Sabonis finished tied in 13th place in Most Valuable Player voting, while Wallace finished tied in 16th place; Wallace also finished in second place in Sixth Man of the Year voting, behind Darrell Armstrong of the Orlando Magic, and Grant finished tied in eighth place in Most Improved Player voting. The Trail Blazers finished fifth in the NBA in home-game attendance, with an attendance of 486,556 at the Rose Garden Arena during the regular season.

=== NBA playoffs ===
In the Western Conference First Round of the 1999 NBA playoffs, the Trail Blazers faced off against the 7th–seeded Phoenix Suns, a team that featured Tom Gugliotta, former Trail Blazers forward Clifford Robinson, and All-Star guard Jason Kidd. The Trail Blazers won the first two games over the Suns at home at the Rose Garden Arena, before winning Game 3 on the road, 103–93 at the America West Arena to win the series in a three-game sweep, and advanced to the Western Conference Semi-finals for the first time since the 1991–92 season.

In the Semi-finals, the team faced off against the 3rd–seeded Utah Jazz, who were led by the trio of All-Star forward, and Most Valuable Player of the Year, Karl Malone, All-Star guard John Stockton, and Jeff Hornacek. Despite the Trail Blazers winning the Pacific Division title, the Jazz, who finished with a better regular-season record, had home-court advantage in the series. Despite this, the Trail Blazers took a 3–1 series lead over the Jazz, before losing Game 5 on the road, 88–71 at the Delta Center. The Trail Blazers won Game 6 over the Jazz at home, 92–80 at the Rose Garden Arena to win the series in six games.

In the Western Conference Finals, the Trail Blazers then faced off against the top–seeded, and Midwest Division champion San Antonio Spurs, who were led by All-Star forward Tim Duncan, All-Star center David Robinson, and Sean Elliott. The Trail Blazers lost the first two games to the Spurs on the road at the Alamodome, and then lost the next two games at home, which included a Game 4 loss to the Spurs at the Rose Garden Arena, 94–80, thus losing the series in a four-game sweep.

The Spurs would advance to the NBA Finals for the first time in franchise history, and defeat the 8th–seeded New York Knicks in five games in the 1999 NBA Finals, winning their first ever NBA championship.

=== Aftermath ===
Following the season, Rider and Jackson were both traded to the Atlanta Hawks, and Williams, Augmon, and second-year center Kelvin Cato were all traded to the Houston Rockets, who soon released Augmon to free agency as he would re-sign with the Trail Blazers soon after.

== Draft picks ==
The Trail Blazers did not own any picks in the 1998 NBA draft.

== Roster ==
1998–99 Portland Trail Blazers roster
Players

Pos.	No.	Player	Height	Weight	DOB	From
G	50	Greg Anthony	6 ft 0 in (1.83 m)	176 lb (80 kg)	1967–11–15	UNLV
F	2	Stacey Augmon	6 ft 8 in (2.03 m)	205 lb (93 kg)	1968–08–01	UNLV
C	31	Kelvin Cato	6 ft 11 in (2.11 m)	255 lb (116 kg)	1974–08–26	Iowa State
F/C	44	Brian Grant	6 ft 9 in (2.06 m)	254 lb (115 kg)	1972–03–05	Xavier
G	23	Gary Grant	6 ft 3 in (1.91 m)	185 lb (84 kg)	1965–04–21	Michigan
G/F	19	Jim Jackson	6 ft 6 in (1.98 m)	220 lb (100 kg)	1970–10–14	Ohio State
F/C	5	Jermaine O'Neal	6 ft 11 in (2.11 m)	226 lb (103 kg)	1978–10–13	Eau Claire HS (SC)
G	34	Isaiah Rider	6 ft 5 in (1.96 m)	215 lb (98 kg)	1971–03–12	UNLV
F/C	4	Carlos Rogers (injured)	6 ft 11 in (2.11 m)	220 lb (100 kg)	1971–02–06	Tennessee State
C	11	Arvydas Sabonis	7 ft 3 in (2.21 m)	279 lb (127 kg)	1964–12–19	Lithuania
G	7	Brian Shaw (injured)	6 ft 6 in (1.98 m)	190 lb (86 kg)	1966–03–22	UC Santa Barbara
G	3	Damon Stoudamire	5 ft 10 in (1.78 m)	171 lb (78 kg)	1973–09–03	Arizona
F	30	Rasheed Wallace	6 ft 10 in (2.08 m)	225 lb (102 kg)	1974–09–17	North Carolina
G/F	6	Bonzi Wells	6 ft 5 in (1.96 m)	210 lb (95 kg)	1976–09–28	Ball State
F	42	Walt Williams	6 ft 8 in (2.03 m)	219 lb (99 kg)	1970–04–16	Maryland

Coaches
Head coach
- Mike Dunleavy
Assistant(s)
- Tony Brown
- Jim Eyen
- Bill Musselman
- Elston Turner

Legend
- (DP) Unsigned draft pick
- (FA) Free agent
- (S) Suspended
- Injured

Roster

== Regular season ==
=== Season standings ===
Pacific Division	W	L	PCT	GB	Home	Road	Div
y-Portland Trail Blazers	35	15	.700	–	22–3	13–12	15–7
x-Los Angeles Lakers	31	19	.620	4	18–7	13–12	14–8
x-Sacramento Kings	27	23	.540	8	16–9	11–14	11–9
x-Phoenix Suns	27	23	.540	8	15–10	12–13	9–10
Seattle SuperSonics	25	25	.500	10	17–8	8–17	11–10
Golden State Warriors	21	29	.420	14	13–12	8–17	8–11
Los Angeles Clippers	9	41	.180	26	6–19	3–22	3–16

#	Western Conference				
#	Team	W	L	PCT	GB
1	z-San Antonio Spurs	37	13	.740	–
2	y-Portland Trail Blazers	35	15	.700	2
3	x-Utah Jazz	37	13	.740	–
4	x-Los Angeles Lakers	31	19	.620	6
5	x-Houston Rockets	31	19	.620	6
6	x-Sacramento Kings	27	23	.540	10
7	x-Phoenix Suns	27	23	.540	10
8	x-Minnesota Timberwolves	25	25	.500	12
9	Seattle SuperSonics	25	25	.500	12
10	Golden State Warriors	21	29	.420	16
11	Dallas Mavericks	19	31	.380	18
12	Denver Nuggets	14	36	.280	23
13	Los Angeles Clippers	9	41	.180	28
14	Vancouver Grizzlies	8	42	.160	29

z – clinched division title
y – clinched division title
x – clinched playoff spot

=== Game log ===
1998–99 game log
Total: 35–15 (home:22–3; road: 13–12)
February: 9–3 (home: 5–0; road: 4–3)

Game	Date	Team	Score	High points	High rebounds	High assists	Location Attendance	Record
1	February 7	@ Seattle	L 88–91	Damon Stoudamire (19)	Brian Grant (11)	Damon Stoudamire (9)	KeyArena; 17,072	0–1
2	February 8	@ Vancouver	W 95–76	Arvydas Sabonis (24)	Arvydas Sabonis (11)	Damon Stoudamire (8)	General Motors Place; 18,353	1–1
3	February 10	Indiana	W 100–92	Isaiah Rider (26)	Isaiah Rider (11)	Damon Stoudamire (9)	Rose Garden; 19,980	2–1
4	February 14	@ Golden State	L 100–105 (2OT)	Arvydas Sabonis (23)	Arvydas Sabonis (17)	Rider, Jackson (5)	The Arena in Oakland; 10,847	2–2
5	February 15	Dallas	W 99–84	Arvydas Sabonis (16)	Brian Grant (11)	Sabonis, Stoudamire (9)	Rose Garden; 18,231	3–2
6	February 17	Denver	W 100–85	Isaiah Rider (19)	Brian Grant (17)	Isaiah Rider (6)	Rose Garden; 17,726	4–2
7	February 19	Boston	W 106–86	Brian Grant (21)	Brian Grant (18)	Damon Stoudamire (7)	Rose Garden; 18,345	5–2
8	February 20	Golden State	W 90–84	Isaiah Rider (27)	Brian Grant (24)	Damon Stoudamire (10)	Rose Garden; 17,645	6–2
9	February 24	@ New Jersey	W 94–85	Walt Williams (22)	Arvydas Sabonis (12)	Damon Stoudamire (6)	Continental Airlines Arena; 17,298	7–2
10	February 26	@ Charlotte	L 95–97	Isaiah Rider (27)	Arvydas Sabonis (10)	Damon Stoudamire (9)	Charlotte Coliseum; 18,633	7–3
11	February 27	@ Washington	W 82–81	Brian Grant (19)	Brian Grant (18)	Damon Stoudamire (6)	MCI Center; 18,550	8–3
12	February 28	@ Minnesota	W 100–93	Rasheed Wallace (22)	Grant, Sabonis (8)	Damon Stoudamire (9)	Target Center; 16,219	9–3

March : 15–3 (home: 9–1; road: 6–2)

Game	Date	Team	Score	High points	High rebounds	High assists	Location Attendance	Record
13	March 2	Utah	W 102–100 (2OT)	Rasheed Wallace (22)	Brian Grant (12)	Damon Stoudamire (8)	Rose Garden; 19,980	10–3
14	March 3	@ Sacramento	W 97–93 (OT)	Brian Grant (20)	Brian Grant (18)	Damon Stoudamire (5)	ARCO Arena; 15,160	11–3
15	March 5	Minnesota	W 97–85	Rasheed Wallace (17)	Arvydas Sabonis (15)	Arvydas Sabonis (7)	Rose Garden; 19,264	12–3
16	March 7	Houston	W 111–71	Isaiah Rider (21)	Grant, O'Neal (6)	Damon Stoudamire (7)	Rose Garden; 20,062	13–3
17	March 8	@ Vancouver	W 92–73	Jim Jackson (21)	Brian Grant (9)	Damon Stoudamire (8)	General Motors Place; 13,552	14–3
18	March 9	Sacramento	W 103–98	Isaiah Rider (21)	Brian Grant (11)	Damon Stoudamire (7)	Rose Garden; 18,147	15–3
19	March 12	Utah	L 77–91	Damon Stoudamire (20)	Arvydas Sabonis (8)	Damon Stoudamire (8)	Rose Garden; 20,668	15–4
20	March 13	@ L.A. Clippers	W 106–96 (OT)	Brian Grant (25)	Brian Grant (14)	Stacey Augmon (3)	Los Angeles Memorial Sports Arena; 9,484	16–4
21	March 15	@ Dallas	W 106–91	Isaiah Rider (30)	Arvydas Sabonis (16)	Damon Stoudamire (6)	Reunion Arena; 14,046	17–4
22	March 16	@ Houston	L 93–101	Damon Stoudamire (17)	Grant, Sabonis (9)	Damon Stoudamire (5)	Compaq Center; 16,285	17–5
23	March 18	@ Sacramento	W 88–78	Rasheed Wallace (25)	Rasheed Wallace (13)	Damon Stoudamire (11)	ARCO Arena; 14,397	18–5
24	March 19	San Antonio	W 90–85	Arvydas Sabonis (28)	Brian Grant (12)	Greg Anthony (5)	Rose Garden; 20,041	19–5
25	March 21	Philadelphia	W 91–75	Rasheed Wallace (26)	Arvydas Sabonis (10)	Jim Jackson (7)	Rose Garden; 19,980	20–5
26	March 23	Golden State	W 79–72	Isaiah Rider (15)	Brian Grant (12)	Damon Stoudamire (7)	Rose Garden; 18,731	21–5
27	March 25	Phoenix	W 97–84	Brian Grant (22)	Brian Grant (14)	Damon Stoudamire (8)	Rose Garden; 20,328	22–5
28	March 28	@ Phoenix	W 88–86	Sabonis, Stoudamire, Rider (18)	Brian Grant (14)	Damon Stoudamire (8)	America West Arena; 19,023	23–5
29	March 30	@ Golden State	L 90–93	Arvydas Sabonis (21)	Arvydas Sabonis (12)	Stoudamire, Wallace (5)	The Arena in Oakland; 12,670	23–6
30	March 31	Sacramento	W 100–86	Damon Stoudamire (21)	Brian Grant (9)	Stoudamire, Anthony (5)	Rose Garden; 18,468	24–6

April : 10–6 (home: 8–1; road: 2–5)

Game	Date	Team	Score	High points	High rebounds	High assists	Location Attendance	Record
31	April 2	Seattle	W 107–95	Isaiah Rider (23)	Arvydas Sabonis (12)	Arvydas Sabonis (7)	Rose Garden; 20,341	25–6
32	April 3	Phoenix	W 98–93	Rasheed Wallace (20)	Arvydas Sabonis (8)	Stoudamire, Rider, Augmon (3)	Rose Garden; 20,056	26–6
33	April 6	Vancouver	W 98–89	Wallace, Rider, Williams (15)	Arvydas Sabonis (8)	Damon Stoudamire (8)	Rose Garden; 18,105	27–6
34	April 8	@ Seattle	L 86–87	Rasheed Wallace (14)	Brian Grant (14)	Damon Stoudamire (5)	KeyArena; 17,072	27–7
35	April 10	@ L.A. Clippers	W 97–70	Rasheed Wallace (19)	Grant, Sabonis, Williams, Jackson (5)	Damon Stoudamire (5)	Arrowhead Pond of Anaheim; 12,853	28–7
36	April 11	L.A. Clippers	L 83–89	Isaiah Rider (17)	Kelvin Cato (11)	Wallace, Stoudamire (4)	Rose Garden; 18,101	28–8
37	April 13	L.A. Lakers	W 113–86	Stoudamire, Rider (16)	Brian Grant (8)	Damon Stoudamire (6)	Rose Garden; 20,705	29–8
38	April 15	@ Houston	L 76–86	Damon Stoudamire (19)	Brian Grant (16)	Damon Stoudamire (6)	Compaq Center; 16,285	29–9
39	April 16	@ San Antonio	L 80–81	Rasheed Wallace (23)	Rasheed Wallace (12)	Jim Jackson (4)	Alamodome; 21,368	29–10
40	April 17	@ Dallas	W 102–94	Arvydas Sabonis (22)	Brian Grant (9)	Damon Stoudamire (5)	Reunion Arena; 13,358	30–10
—	April 20	@ Denver	Postponed due to the Columbine High School shooting. Makeup date May 2.					
41	April 21	L.A. Lakers	W 88–82	Rasheed Wallace (21)	Arvydas Sabonis (11)	Damon Stoudamire (6)	Rose Garden; 20,713	31–10
42	April 23	@ Utah	L 85–96	Jim Jackson (13)	Brian Grant (6)	Damon Stoudamire (6)	Delta Center; 19,911	31–11
43	April 25	Minnesota	W 100–84	Brian Grant (24)	Grant, Wallace (11)	Damon Stoudamire (5)	Rose Garden; 20,437	32–11
44	April 26	Denver	W 93–77	Walt Williams (28)	Sabonis, Cato (9)	Damon Stoudamire (9)	Rose Garden; 19,476	33–11
45	April 28	Seattle	W 119–84	Damon Stoudamire (31)	Arvydas Sabonis (11)	Damon Stoudamire (6)	Rose Garden; 20,311	34–11
46	April 29	@ L.A. Lakers	L 89–108	Damon Stoudamire (17)	Brian Grant (10)	Stoudamire, Augmon, Anthony, Williams (3)	Great Western Forum; 17,505	34–12

May : 1–3 (home: 0–1; road: 1–2)

Game	Date	Team	Score	High points	High rebounds	High assists	Location Attendance	Record
47	May 1	@ San Antonio	L 90–98 (OT)	Arvydas Sabonis (14)	Brian Grant (11)	Damon Stoudamire (6)	Alamodome; 28,806	34–13
48	May 2	@ Denver	W 110–102	Damon Stoudamire (17)	Brian Grant (9)	Stoudamire, Jackson (9)	McNichols Sports Arena; 13,920	35–13
49	May 4	San Antonio	L 81–87	Arvydas Sabonis (18)	Brian Grant (10)	Arvydas Sabonis (8)	Rose Garden; 20,715	35–14
50	May 5	@ L.A. Lakers	L 91–119	Rasheed Wallace (23)	Cato, O'Neal (8)	Stoudamire, Jackson, O'Neal (4)	Great Western Forum; 17,505	35–15

1998–99 schedule

== Playoffs ==
1999 playoff game log
First round: 3–0 (home: 2–0; road: 1–0)

Game	Date	Team	Score	High points	High rebounds	High assists	Location Attendance	Series
1	May 8	Phoenix	W 95–85	Isaiah Rider (25)	Brian Grant (10)	Arvydas Sabonis (8)	Rose Garden; 20,040	1–0
2	May 10	Phoenix	W 110–99	Grant, Stoudamire (22)	Arvydas Sabonis (9)	Damon Stoudamire (13)	Rose Garden; 20,588	2–0
3	May 12	@ Phoenix	W 103–93	Brian Grant (20)	Arvydas Sabonis (11)	Damon Stoudamire (7)	America West Arena; 17,306	3–0

Conference Semi-finals: 4–2 (home: 3–0; road: 1–2)

Game	Date	Team	Score	High points	High rebounds	High assists	Location Attendance	Series
1	May 18	@ Utah	L 83–93	Brian Grant (19)	Arvydas Sabonis (11)	Damon Stoudamire (5)	Delta Center; 19,911	0–1
2	May 20	@ Utah	W 84–81	Isaiah Rider (27)	Arvydas Sabonis (14)	Damon Stoudamire (6)	Delta Center; 19,911	1–1
3	May 22	Utah	W 97–87	Rasheed Wallace (20)	Brian Grant (15)	Isaiah Rider (8)	Rose Garden; 20,720	2–1
4	May 23	Utah	W 81–75	Isaiah Rider (24)	Arvydas Sabonis (15)	Greg Anthony (3)	Rose Garden; 20,720	3–1
5	May 25	@ Utah	L 71–88	Isaiah Rider (16)	Brian Grant (10)	Damon Stoudamire (6)	Delta Center; 19,911	3–2
6	May 27	Utah	W 92–80	Isaiah Rider (24)	Brian Grant (12)	Jim Jackson (6)	Rose Garden; 20,727	4–2

Conference finals: 0–4 (home: 0–2; road: 0–2)

Game	Date	Team	Score	High points	High rebounds	High assists	Location Attendance	Series
1	May 29	@ San Antonio	L 76–80	Rasheed Wallace (28)	Rasheed Wallace (8)	Damon Stoudamire (8)	Alamodome; 35,165	0–1
2	May 31	@ San Antonio	L 85–86	Arvydas Sabonis (17)	Grant, Sabonis (7)	Damon Stoudamire (7)	Alamodome; 35,260	0–2
3	June 4	San Antonio	L 63–85	Rasheed Wallace (22)	Brian Grant (13)	Stoudamire, Williams (3)	Rose Garden; 20,732	0–3
4	June 6	San Antonio	L 80–94	Damon Stoudamire (21)	Arvydas Sabonis (7)	three players tied (4)	Rose Garden; 20,735	0–4

1999 schedule

== Player statistics ==
Legend
GP	Games played	GS	Games started	MPG	Minutes per game
FG%	Field-goal percentage	3P%	3-point field-goal percentage	FT%	Free-throw percentage
RPG	Rebounds per game	APG	Assists per game	SPG	Steals per game
BPG	Blocks per game	PPG	Points per game

=== Regular season ===
Player	GP	GS	MPG	FG%	3P%	FT%	RPG	APG	SPG	BPG	PPG
Damon Stoudamire	50	50	33.5	.396	.310	.730	3.3	6.2	1.0	.1	12.6
Arvydas Sabonis	50	48	27.0	.485	.292	.771	7.9	2.4	.7	1.3	12.1
Greg Anthony	50	0	16.1	.414	.392	.697	1.3	2.0	1.3	.1	6.4
Rasheed Wallace	49	18	28.9	.508	.419	.732	4.9	1.2	1.0	1.1	12.8
Jim Jackson	49	9	24.0	.411	.278	.842	3.2	2.6	.9	.1	8.4
Brian Grant	48	46	31.8	.479		.814	9.8	1.4	.4	.7	11.5
Stacey Augmon	48	21	18.2	.448	.000	.684	2.6	1.2	1.2	.4	4.3
Walt Williams	48	16	21.8	.424	.438	.832	3.0	1.7	.8	.6	9.3
Isaiah Rider	47	41	29.5	.412	.378	.755	4.2	2.2	.5	.2	13.9
Kelvin Cato	43	0	12.7	.450	1.000	.507	3.5	.4	.5	1.3	3.5
Jermaine O'Neal	36	1	8.6	.434	.000	.514	2.7	.4	.1	.4	2.5
Bonzi Wells	7	0	5.0	.550	.333	.444	1.3	.4	.1	.1	4.4
John Crotty^{†}	3	0	6.3	.500	1.000	1.000	.3	1.7	.7	.0	4.0
Carlos Rogers	2	0	4.0	1.000		.250	.5	.5	.0	.0	2.5
Gary Grant	2	0	3.5	.000			.0	1.5	.5	.0	.0
Brian Shaw	1	0	5.0	.000			1.0	1.0	.0	.0	.0

=== Playoffs ===
Player	GP	GS	MPG	FG%	3P%	FT%	RPG	APG	SPG	BPG	PPG
Brian Grant	13	13	37.1	.529		.625	9.2	1.1	.8	1.2	13.2
Rasheed Wallace	13	13	36.0	.514	.111	.724	4.8	1.5	1.5	.8	14.8
Isaiah Rider	13	13	32.8	.429	.423	.887	3.8	2.4	.8	.0	16.5
Damon Stoudamire	13	13	31.0	.380	.455	.706	3.2	5.6	.6	.1	10.2
Arvydas Sabonis	13	13	30.2	.398	.200	.907	8.8	2.2	1.2	1.2	10.0
Jim Jackson	13	0	20.4	.361	.278	.905	2.3	1.5	.5	.1	7.3
Greg Anthony	13	0	17.3	.327	.258	.676	1.1	2.5	1.0	.1	5.2
Walt Williams	13	0	14.2	.362	.406	.571	1.2	.8	.5	.2	4.8
Stacey Augmon	13	0	13.5	.357	.000	.833	2.5	.4	.6	.2	2.7
Jermaine O'Neal	9	0	6.1	.400		.500	1.9	.1	.0	.3	1.6
Kelvin Cato	8	0	5.4	.111		.400	.9	.3	.1	.1	.8

- ^{†} Denotes player spent time with another team in the season. Stats reflect time with the Trail Blazers only.

Player statistics citation:

== Awards and honors ==
- Mike Dunleavy, NBA Coach of the Year
