= Vernon Maxwell =

American basketball player (born 1965)

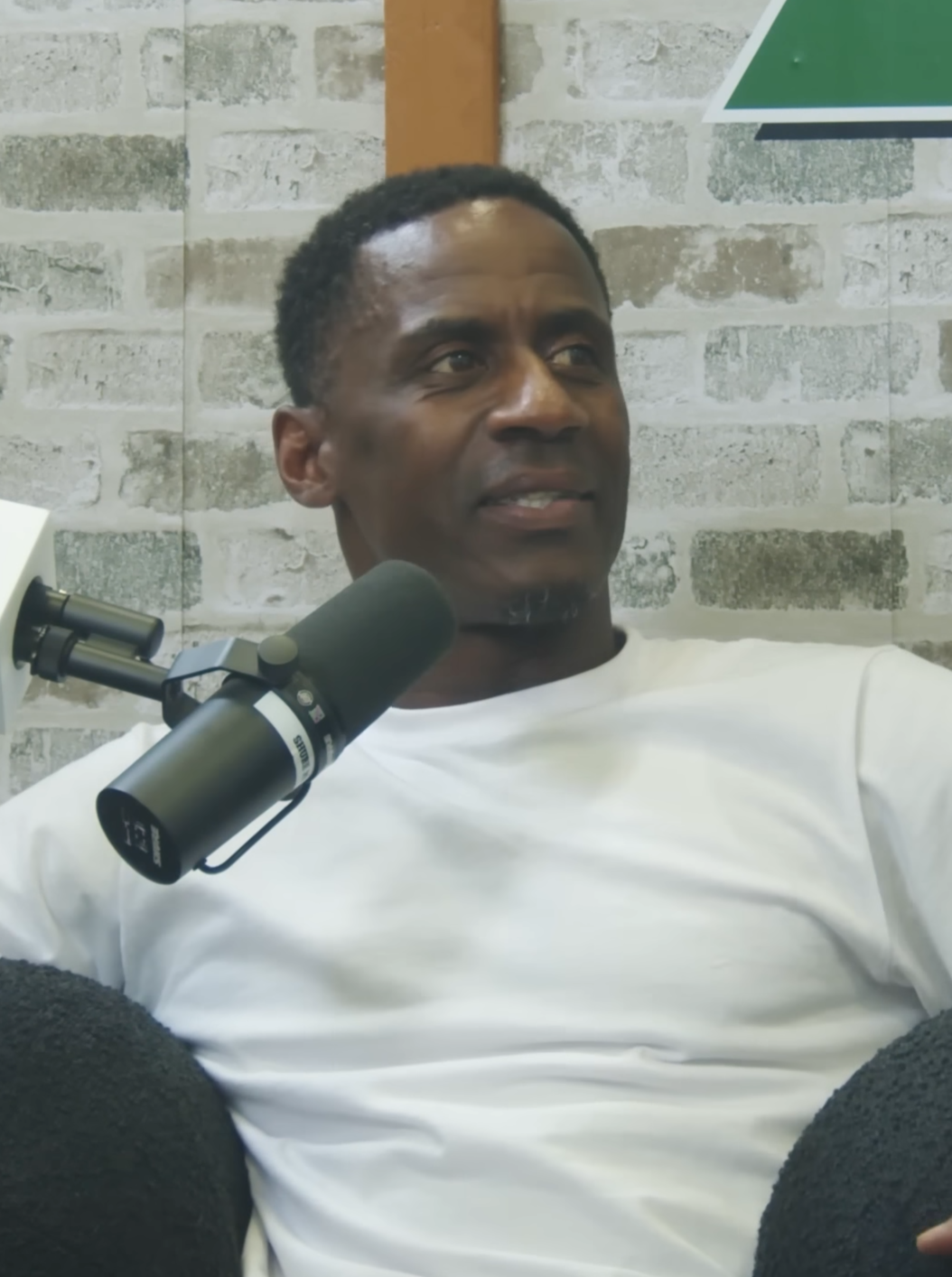
- Maxwell in 2023

Personal information
- Born: September 12, 1965 (age 61) Gainesville, Florida, U.S.
- Listed height: 6 ft 4 in (1.93 m)
- Listed weight: 190 lb (86 kg)

Career information
- High school: Buchholz (Gainesville, Florida)
- College: Florida (1984–1988)
- NBA draft: 1988: 2nd round, 47th overall pick
- Drafted by: Denver Nuggets
- Playing career: 1988–2001
- Position: Shooting guard / point guard
- Number: 11, 2, 3

Career history
- 1988–1990: San Antonio Spurs
- 1990–1995: Houston Rockets
- 1995–1996: Philadelphia 76ers
- 1996–1997: San Antonio Spurs
- 1998: Orlando Magic
- 1998: Charlotte Hornets
- 1999: Sacramento Kings
- 1999–2000: Seattle SuperSonics
- 2000: Philadelphia 76ers
- 2001: Dallas Mavericks

Career highlights
- 2× NBA champion (1994, 1995); 2× First-team All-SEC (1987, 1988); Second-team All-SEC (1986); Florida Mr. Basketball (1984)

Career NBA statistics
- Points: 10,912 (12.8 ppg)
- Rebounds: 2,200 (2.6 rpg)
- Assists: 2,912 (3.4 apg)
- Stats at NBA.com
- Stats at Basketball Reference

Vernon Maxwell (born September 12, 1965) is an American former professional basketball player. He was a shooting guard in the National Basketball Association (NBA) for thirteen seasons during the late 1980s, 1990s, and early 2000s.

Maxwell played college basketball for the University of Florida, and led the Florida Gators to their first-ever NCAA tournament appearance. He was selected by the Denver Nuggets in the second round of the 1988 NBA draft and was immediately traded to the San Antonio Spurs. His longest and most successful NBA tenure was with the Houston Rockets.

The nickname "Mad Max" was bestowed upon Maxwell by color commentators for his clutch three-point shooting, which reached its pinnacle in the deciding game of the 1994 NBA Finals between Houston and New York. Maxwell is among just nine players in NBA history to amass 30 points in a single quarter, accomplishing that feat en route to a 51-point outing on January 26, 1991, against Cleveland.

== Early years ==
Maxwell was born in Gainesville, Florida. He attended Buchholz High School in Gainesville, and played for the Buchholz Bobcats high school basketball team. As a senior, Maxwell was the Mr. Basketball of the state of Florida as well as being an all-state defensive back in football.

== College career ==
Maxwell received an athletic scholarship to attend the University of Florida, where he played for coach Norm Sloan's Florida Gators men's basketball from 1984 to 1988. The 6-foot-4 guard averaged 20.2 points as a senior and still holds five Gators team records. He left school after four years as the Gators' all-time leading scorer (2,450) and the No. 2 scorer in Southeastern Conference history behind LSU's Pete Maravich. He remains the third-leading scorer in Southeastern Conference history. He averaged more than 20 points in both his junior and senior seasons, although Florida would erase all the points Maxwell scored in those seasons because Maxwell accepted money from agents as well as a free round-trip ticket to go to a basketball camp. However, on September 18, 2025, the University Athletic Association restored his statistics from his last two seasons, restoring Maxwell to his previous position as the all-time leading scorer in Gator history.

== Professional career ==
=== San Antonio (1988-1990) ===
On June 28, 1988, Maxwell was drafted into the NBA by the Denver Nuggets, who traded him the same day to the San Antonio Spurs for a second-round pick the next year. Two years later, his contract was sold to the Houston Rockets for $50,000. In 2022, he went on Gilbert Arenas' podcast and told him that he was sent to Houston because he ignored Gregg Popovich's orders to stay out of clubs.

=== Houston (1990-1995) ===
In his first 30 games with Houston, his scoring nearly doubled what he had scored his last 49 games in San Antonio. In January 1991, he became the fourth player to score 30 points in a quarter when he scored 30 of his career high 51 points in the fourth quarter of the Rockets 103–97 win against the Cleveland Cavaliers. Maxwell held the NBA's record for most 3-pointers made in a season from 1991 to 1993. In 1993, with the Rockets off to a 14-0 start, they faced the 9-2 New York Knicks in New York on December 2, in an attempt to start their season an NBA-record tying 15-0. Maxwell said that "we heard that they were saying things about our streak ending there. I was irritated by that. I wanted to talk. But we all decided to let our play do the talking." They won going away 93-85, with Maxwell scoring 17 and adding 6 assists, further solidifying their start which would extend to 22-2. That season, he hit several shots to lead the Rockets to wins, including a buzzer-beater leading to an overtime win against the Miami Heat on December 9 and five points in the final 50 seconds to give the Rockets a come-from-behind win against the San Antonio Spurs on December 22. For the season, he averaged 13.1 points, 3.1 rebounds, and 5.1 assists. In game three of the 1994 Western Conference Semifinals, Maxwell scored 31 points in the second half, helping the Rockets overcome a 2-0 deficit and saving their season, according to teammate Mario Elie. During the 1994 NBA Finals, Maxwell scored 21 points in the deciding game 7, helping the Rockets win their first NBA championship.

On February 6, 1995, Maxwell went into the stands during a road game against the Portland Trail Blazers and punched a fan that had allegedly made racist comments and derogatory remarks about the player's stillborn daughter. The fan, Steve George, denied Maxwell's allegations. Maxwell was suspended for 10 games and fined $20,000 for the incident. At the time, it was the highest fine in NBA history and the second longest suspension. Maxwell was not a part of the Rockets' 1995 championship roster, quitting the team after a loss to Utah in the 1995 playoffs. Clyde Drexler, who Houston had acquired in February 1995, had taken away most of Maxwell's minutes and his starting spot. The decision to quit the team is something that Maxwell has said he regrets. Maxwell said that he was frustrated that he had lost playing time to Drexler. He also said that he was frustrated that he hadn't been contacted by the front office while on his suspension for going into the stands and that he felt unappreciated by a team to which he had given so much. He was waived by the Rockets in June 1995.

=== Philadelphia 76ers (1995-1996) ===
The Philadelphia 76ers signed Maxwell in the fall of 1995. Maxwell said he had been offered more money to play for the Indiana Pacers or the Charlotte Hornets but the opportunity to play for John Lucas convinced him to sign with the 76ers. Maxwell scored 16.2 points, grabbed 3.1 rebounds, and dished out 4.4 assists a game on 39% shooting that season. His high-scoring game for that season was 41.

=== San Antonio Spurs, second stint (1996-1997) ===
Maxwell signed a one-year contract with the San Antonio Spurs in August 1996. Coach Bob Hill said he wanted Maxwell to be himself. When he signed, Hill said, "I want him to be feisty. I want him to want to punch somebody. I want him to stand up for what he believes. The Spurs that year went 20-62 largely because their biggest star David Robinson fell victim to injuries which limited him to only six games that year. Consequently, Maxwell deemed this the worst team he played on. For the season, he averaged 12.9 points a game on 38% shooting.

=== Orlando Magic (1998) ===
Maxwell signed a 10-day contract with the Orlando Magic on January 5, 1998. He signed a second 10-day contract on January 15. Over the 11 games he played for the Magic he averaged 7.4 points on 38% shooting.

=== Charlotte Hornets (1998) ===
Maxwell signed a 10-day contract with the Charlotte Hornets on February 3. In his first game with the team, he hit the go-ahead basket with 55 seconds left to lead the Hornets to a 93-89 win against the Boston Celtics. On February 14, the Hornets signed Maxwell for the remainder of the year. For the Hornets, Maxwell averaged 6.8 points-per-game on 49% shooting.

=== Sacramento Kings (1998-1999) ===
Maxwell signed with the Sacramento Kings on January 22, 1999. For the strike-shortened 1998-99 NBA season, Maxwell played 46 of the 50 games and averaged 10.7 points a game on 39% shooting. The Kings went 27-23 on the season.

=== Seattle Supersonics (1999-2000) ===
He signed with the Seattle SuperSonics prior to the 1999–2000 season. In March, he got into a fight with Sonics star Gary Payton and accidentally hit Horace Grant with a 5-pound weight, when he was trying to break up the fight, injuring Grant's shoulder and forcing him to miss the Sonics next game. Shortly before the Sonics' first round series against the Utah Jazz, it was reported that he would miss the playoffs due to a knee injury, much to the delight of Utah's players.

== Personal life ==
In August 1995, Maxwell was charged with and convicted of misdemeanor possession of a controlled substance after Houston police reportedly found marijuana in his vehicle during a traffic stop. He would later file appeals to overturn his conviction, but was forced to surrender himself to Houston authorities in April 1998 after the United States Supreme Court refused to hear his case.

In February 1996, Maxwell was ordered by a court to pay $592,000 to Sheila Rias after failing to respond to her lawsuit alleging him of knowingly infecting her with herpes in 1995. Maxwell received a new trial after claiming Rias had served him improperly, then received a third trial after another default judgment. One day before the third trial was set to begin, Maxwell filed for bankruptcy.

In the summer of 1996, Maxwell took his eight-year-old son, Dominique, to Shands Hospital for a blood test in the hopes of refuting paternity. After the test proved he was the father, Maxwell gave Dominique $40 if he promised not to tell his mother, Myra Jenkins.

In April 2004, Maxwell spent five days in jail in Gainesville for failure to pay $150,000 in child support to Jenkins. After release, he was extradited to Cobb County on charges of kidnapping and aggravated assault against Belinda Beine, who was described as a recent companion.

In August 2020, Maxwell made allegations of racial discrimination against Emerson police after being arrested on charges of aggravated stalking, possession of less than one ounce of marijuana, operating a vehicle without a current license plate, operating a truck with an obstructed license plate, not having his driver's license in his immediate possession when operating a motor vehicle, possession of an open container of an alcoholic beverage in the passenger area, and driving under the combined influence of alcohol and drugs.

== Career statistics ==
Legend
GP	Games played	GS	Games started	MPG	Minutes per game
FG%	Field goal percentage	3P%	3-point field goal percentage	FT%	Free throw percentage
RPG	Rebounds per game	APG	Assists per game	SPG	Steals per game
BPG	Blocks per game	PPG	Points per game	**Bold**	Career high
†	Won an NBA championship	*	Led the league

=== NBA ===
==== Regular season ====
Year	Team	GP	GS	MPG	FG%	3P%	FT%	RPG	APG	SPG	BPG	PPG
1988–89	San Antonio	79	36	26.1	.432	.248	.745	2.6	3.8	1.1	.1	11.7
1989–90	San Antonio	49	2	22.8	.435	.288	.621	2.9	3.0	.9	.1	6.9
1989–90	Houston	30	10	29.0	**.442**	.245	.664	2.9	5.0	1.4	.2	12.5
1990–91	Houston	**82***	79	**35.0**	.404	.337	.733	2.9	3.7	1.5	.2	17.0
1991–92	Houston	80	**80**	33.8	.413	.342	.772	3.0	4.1	1.3	**.4**	**17.2**
1992–93	Houston	71	68	31.7	.407	.332	.719	**3.1**	4.2	1.2	.1	13.8
1993–94†	Houston	75	73	34.3	.389	.298	.749	**3.1**	**5.1**	**1.7**	.3	13.6
1994–95†	Houston	64	54	31.8	.394	.324	.688	2.6	4.3	1.2	.2	13.3
1995–96	Philadelphia	75	57	32.9	.390	.317	.756	**3.1**	4.4	1.3	.2	16.2
1996–97	San Antonio	72	31	28.7	.375	.309	.744	2.2	2.1	1.2	.3	12.9
1997–98	Orlando	11	0	15.4	.333	.231	**.885**	1.2	1.1	.2	.1	7.4
1997–98	Charlotte	31	0	15.1	.428	**.360**	.735	1.4	1.3	.5	.1	6.8
1998–99	Sacramento	46	1	21.9	.390	.346	.737	1.8	1.7	.7	.1	10.7
1999–00	Seattle	47	0	21.0	.345	.300	.730	1.7	1.6	.8	.2	10.9
2000–01	Philadelphia	24	6	15.6	.336	.328	.682	1.5	1.2	.5	.0	5.0
2000–01	Dallas	19	0	15.0	.316	.277	.600	1.5	1.1	.5	.2	4.3
Career		855	497	28.4	.398	.320	.733	2.6	3.4	1.1	.2	12.8

==== Playoffs ====
Year	Team	GP	GS	MPG	FG%	3P%	FT%	RPG	APG	SPG	BPG	PPG
1990	Houston	4	4	**39.8**	'.370	.308	.524	3.0	**4.3**	**1.3**	.0	**19.8**
1991	Houston	3	3	37.7	**.411**	**.333**	.500	2.7	3.0	.7	**.3**	18.7
1993	Houston	9	7	34.2	.402	.239	.875	2.4	3.6	1.2	.2	14.0
1994†	Houston	**23**	**23**	38.3	.376	.326	.685	**3.5**	4.2	.9	.1	13.8
1995†	Houston	1	0	16.0	.143	.000	**1.000**	3.0	1.0	.0	.0	3.0
1999	Sacramento	5	0	25.8	.317	.314	.700	2.2	1.0	1.2	.0	11.2
2001	Dallas	4	0	10.8	.200	.000	–	1.5	1.3	.0	.0	1.0
Career		49	37	33.6	.372	.301	.696	2.9	3.4	.9	.1	13.1

== See also ==
- List of people banned or suspended by the NBA
