= Joe Kleine =

American basketball player (born 1962)

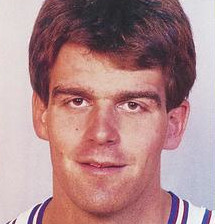
- Kleine, circa 1986

Personal information
- Born: January 4, 1962 (age 64) Colorado Springs, Colorado, U.S.
- Listed height: 6 ft 11 in (2.11 m)
- Listed weight: 255 lb (116 kg)

Career information
- High school: Slater (Slater, Missouri)
- College: Notre Dame (1980–1981); Arkansas (1982–1985)
- NBA draft: 1985: 1st round, 6th overall pick
- Drafted by: Sacramento Kings
- Playing career: 1985–2000
- Position: Center
- Number: 35, 53
- Coaching career: 2007–2015

Career history

Playing
- 1985–1989: Sacramento Kings
- 1989–1993: Boston Celtics
- 1993–1997: Phoenix Suns
- 1997: Los Angeles Lakers
- 1997: New Jersey Nets
- 1997–1998: Chicago Bulls
- 1999: Phoenix Suns
- 1999–2000: Portland Trail Blazers

Coaching
- 2007–2015: Little Rock (assistant)

Career highlights
- NBA champion (1998); First-team All-SWC (1985); Second-team Parade All-American (1980); McDonald's All-American (1980)

Career NBA statistics
- Points: 4,666 (4.8 ppg)
- Rebounds: 3,991 (4.1 rpg)
- Stats at NBA.com
- Stats at Basketball Reference
Medals
Men's basketball
Representing the United States
Olympic Games
| Gold medal – first place | 1984 Los Angeles | Team competition |
World Championships
| Silver medal – second place | 1982 Colombia | Team competition |

Joseph William Kleine (born January 4, 1962) is an American former professional basketball player who played fifteen seasons in the National Basketball Association (NBA) and for the US national team. Nicknamed Taco Joe, he won a gold medal as a member of the United States men's basketball team at the 1984 Summer Olympics in Los Angeles. In 1998, he won the NBA championship as a member of the Chicago Bulls. Kleine is now a restaurant proprietor, owning a number of successful Corky's Ribs & BBQ restaurants.

== College career ==
Kleine, a seven-foot center, graduated from Slater High School in Slater, Missouri and originally enrolled to play basketball at the University of Notre Dame. After his freshman season, Kleine transferred to the University of Arkansas where he played alongside Darrell Walker and Alvin Robertson, who, like Kleine, would go on to have productive professional careers.

Kleine's first season at Arkansas, he helped the Razorbacks to a 26–4 record, finish second in the Southwest Conference (SWC), and make the second round of the NCAA Tournament. His junior season, Kleine helped Arkansas to a record of 25–7, another second-place finish in the SWC, and a first round loss in the NCAA Tournament. The biggest victory of the season came on February 12, 1984, at the Convention Center in Pine Bluff, Arkansas, when Kleine helped the Razorbacks upset the #1 ranked North Carolina Tarheels, led by Michael Jordan, thanks to a basket by teammate Charles Balentine at the end of the game. Kleine finished that game with 20 points and 10 rebounds. As a senior in the 1984–85 season, Kleine was named 1st Team All-SWC. Arkansas (22–13) finished second in the SWC for the third year in a row, and a second round loss in the NCAA Tournament.

== Professional career ==
Kleine was selected by the Sacramento Kings with the sixth pick in the 1985 NBA draft. Kleine went on to a fifteen-year NBA career, playing with the Kings as well as the Boston Celtics, Phoenix Suns, Los Angeles Lakers, New Jersey Nets, Chicago Bulls, and Portland Trail Blazers. Kleine played on teams with legendary NBA players Michael Jordan, Charles Barkley, Larry Bird, Kevin McHale, Robert Parish, Scottie Pippen, and Dennis Rodman. He won an NBA championship in 1998, as a center, for a Chicago Bulls team that included Michael Jordan, Scottie Pippen, Dennis Rodman, and Steve Kerr.

His best season was with the Kings in 1987–88, when he averaged 9.8 PPG. At the time of his retirement from the NBA, he'd scored 4,666 points, had 3,991 total rebounds, and had scored 849 free throws out of 1,069 attempts.

== National team career ==
Kleine played for the US national team in the 1982 FIBA World Championship, winning the silver medal. Along with his college teammate Robertson, he also won a gold medal as a member of the 1984 U.S. Olympic basketball team coached by Bob Knight. Sportswriter Jon Goode would later write that "Joe Kleine was never a star, but what made Kleine great was that he accepted his role and was ready to play every night."

== Coaching career ==
After coaching AAU and high school basketball in Little Rock and serving as an analyst for Arkansas basketball games, Kleine was hired as an assistant coach at the University of Arkansas at Little Rock in 2007.

== Movie appearance ==
Kleine appeared in the 1996 movie Eddie as himself.

== Career statistics ==
Legend
| GP | Games played | GS | Games started | MPG | Minutes per game |
| FG% | Field goal percentage | 3P% | 3-point field goal percentage | FT% | Free throw percentage |
| RPG | Rebounds per game | APG | Assists per game | SPG | Steals per game |
| BPG | Blocks per game | PPG | Points per game | **Bold** | Career high |
| † | Won an NBA championship |

=== NBA ===
==== Regular season ====
| Year | Team | GP | GS | MPG | FG% | 3P% | FT% | RPG | APG | SPG | BPG | PPG |
|---|---|---|---|---|---|---|---|---|---|---|---|---|
| 1985–86 | Sacramento | 80 | 18 | 14.8 | .465 | – | .723 | 4.7 | .6 | .3 | .4 | 5.2 |
| 1986–87 | Sacramento | 79 | 31 | 21.0 | .471 | .000 | .786 | 6.1 | .9 | .4 | .4 | 7.9 |
| 1987–88 | Sacramento | **82** | **60** | **24.4** | .472 | – | .814 | **7.1** | **1.1** | .3 | **.7** | **9.8** |
| 1988–89 | Sacramento | 47 | 11 | 19.4 | .383 | .000 | .920 | 5.1 | .7 | .4 | .4 | 6.7 |
| 1988–89 | Boston | 28 | 2 | 17.8 | .457 | .000 | .828 | 4.9 | **1.1** | **.5** | .2 | 6.1 |
| 1989–90 | Boston | 81 | 4 | 16.9 | .480 | .000 | .830 | 4.4 | .6 | .2 | .3 | 5.4 |
| 1990–91 | Boston | 72 | 1 | 11.8 | .468 | .000 | .783 | 3.4 | .3 | .2 | .2 | 3.6 |
| 1991–92 | Boston | 70 | 3 | 14.2 | **.491** | .500 | .708 | 4.2 | .5 | .3 | .2 | 4.7 |
| 1992–93 | Boston | 78 | 3 | 14.5 | .404 | .000 | .707 | 4.4 | .5 | .2 | .2 | 3.3 |
| 1993–94 | Phoenix | 74 | 4 | 11.5 | .488 | .455 | .769 | 2.6 | .6 | .2 | .3 | 3.9 |
| 1994–95 | Phoenix | 75 | 42 | 12.6 | .449 | .000 | .857 | 3.5 | .5 | .2 | .2 | 3.7 |
| 1995–96 | Phoenix | 56 | 9 | 11.8 | .420 | .286 | .800 | 2.4 | .8 | .2 | .1 | 2.9 |
| 1996–97 | Phoenix | 23 | 10 | 15.9 | .400 | **1.000** | .722 | 3.5 | .5 | .4 | .3 | 3.4 |
| 1996–97 | L.A. Lakers | 8 | 0 | 3.8 | .250 | – | **1.000** | 1.1 | .0 | .0 | .0 | .8 |
| 1996–97 | New Jersey | 28 | 0 | 16.2 | .427 | .500 | .722 | 4.1 | .8 | .3 | .4 | 3.0 |
| 1997–98† | Chicago | 46 | 1 | 8.6 | .368 | – | .833 | 1.7 | .7 | .1 | .1 | 2.0 |
| 1998–99 | Phoenix | 31 | 5 | 12.1 | .405 | .000 | .667 | 2.2 | .4 | .3 | .0 | 2.2 |
| 1999–00 | Portland | 7 | 0 | 4.4 | .364 | – | **1.000** | .9 | .3 | .1 | .0 | 1.6 |
| Career | | 965 | 204 | 15.2 | .453 | .271 | .794 | 4.1 | .6 | .3 | .3 | 4.8 |

==== Playoffs ====
| Year | Team | GP | GS | MPG | FG% | 3P% | FT% | RPG | APG | SPG | BPG | PPG |
|---|---|---|---|---|---|---|---|---|---|---|---|---|
| 1986 | Sacramento | 3 | 0 | 15.0 | .385 | – | .833 | 4.7 | .3 | .3 | .3 | 5.0 |
| 1989 | Boston | 3 | 0 | **21.7** | .545 | .000 | .778 | **5.7** | .7 | .0 | .3 | **6.3** |
| 1990 | Boston | 5 | 0 | 15.8 | **.765** | .000 | .833 | 2.8 | .4 | .4 | .6 | 6.2 |
| 1991 | Boston | 5 | 1 | 6.2 | .444 | – | – | 2.2 | .2 | .0 | .0 | 1.6 |
| 1992 | Boston | 9 | 0 | 9.1 | .409 | .000 | **1.000** | 2.4 | .1 | .0 | .1 | 2.2 |
| 1993 | Boston | 4 | 0 | 7.3 | .600 | – | – | 1.3 | .0 | .0 | .3 | 1.5 |
| 1994 | Phoenix | 8 | 0 | 10.1 | .429 | – | .667 | 2.1 | .4 | .1 | .5 | 3.5 |
| 1995 | Phoenix | **10** | **10** | 16.7 | .574 | **.500** | – | 3.1 | **.8** | .5 | .3 | **6.3** |
| 1996 | Phoenix | 2 | 0 | 4.0 | .000 | – | – | .5 | .0 | .5 | .0 | .0 |
| 1999 | Phoenix | 1 | 0 | 5.0 | .500 | – | – | 1.0 | .0 | **1.0** | **1.0** | 2.0 |
| Career | | 50 | 11 | 11.8 | .515 | .200 | .793 | 2.7 | .4 | .2 | .3 | 3.8 |
