= 1998–99 Phoenix Suns season =

NBA team season

- Head coach: Danny Ainge
- General manager: Bryan Colangelo
- Owners: Jerry Colangelo
- Arena: America West Arena

Results
- Record: 27–23 (.540)
- Place: Division: 4th (Pacific); Conference: 7th (Western)
- Playoff finish: First round (lost to Portland 0–3)
- Stats at Basketball Reference

Local media
- Television: KUTP; Fox Sports Arizona; Cox 9
- Radio: KTAR

The 1998–99 Phoenix Suns season was the 31st season for the Phoenix Suns in the National Basketball Association. Due to a lockout, the regular season began on February 5, 1999, and was cut from 82 games to 50.

== Season summary ==
=== Off-season ===
During the off-season, the Suns signed free agent and All-Star forward Tom Gugliotta, acquired Luc Longley from the Chicago Bulls, acquired rookie power forward Pat Garrity from the Dallas Mavericks on draft day, signed Chris Morris, and re-signed former Suns center Joe Kleine.

=== Regular season ===
With the addition of Gugliotta and Longley, the Suns got off to an 8–5 start to the regular season in February. However, the team soon fell below .500 in winning percentage by posting a 7–11 record in March. With a 15–18 record as of April 3, 1999, the Suns won 12 of their final 17 games of the season, and finished tied with the Sacramento Kings for third place in the Pacific Division with a 27–23 record, earning the seventh seed in the Western Conference; the team qualified for the NBA playoffs for the eleventh consecutive year.

Gugliotta averaged 17.0 points, 8.9 rebounds and 1.4 steals per game, while Jason Kidd averaged 16.9 points, 10.8 assists and 2.3 steals per game, Clifford Robinson provided with 16.4 points and 1.5 steals per game, and Rex Chapman contributed 12.1 points per game; Kidd was named to the All-NBA First Team, and to the NBA All-Defensive First Team. In addition, sixth man Danny Manning averaged 9.1 points and 4.4 rebounds per game off the bench, while Longley provided the team with 8.7 points and 5.7 rebounds per game, George McCloud contributed 8.9 points per game and led the Suns with 69 three-point field goals, and Garrity contributed 5.6 points per game.

Kidd finished in fifth place in Most Valuable Player voting, while Robinson finished tied in seventh place in Defensive Player of the Year voting, and also finished tied in tenth place in Most Improved Player voting. The Suns finished seventh in the NBA in home-game attendance, with an attendance of 472,283 at the America West Arena during the regular season.

=== NBA playoffs ===
In the Western Conference First Round of the 1999 NBA playoffs, the Suns faced off against the 2nd–seeded, and Pacific Division champion Portland Trail Blazers, who were led by Isaiah Rider, Rasheed Wallace and Damon Stoudamire. The Suns lost the first two games to the Trail Blazers on the road at the Rose Garden Arena, before losing Game 3 at home, 103–93 at the America West Arena, thus losing the series in a three-game sweep. It was the fourth consecutive year that the Suns lost in the opening round of the NBA playoffs.

=== Aftermath ===
Following the season, Manning and Garrity were both traded to the Orlando Magic, who then traded Manning to the Milwaukee Bucks two weeks later, while McCloud signed as a free agent with the Denver Nuggets, Kleine signed with the Portland Trail Blazers, and Morris retired.

== Offseason ==
=== NBA draft ===
This was the first year in franchise history that the Suns had no draft picks. Their first-round pick (which turned into Tyronn Lue) was traded to the Denver Nuggets the previous year in the Antonio McDyess deal, and their second-round pick (which turned into Greg Buckner) was traded to the Dallas Mavericks in 1996 in the Jason Kidd deal.

== Roster ==
1998–99 Phoenix Suns roster
Players

Pos.	No.	Player	Height	Weight	DOB	From
G	12	Toby Bailey	6 ft 6 in (1.98 m)	213 lb (97 kg)	1975–11–19	UCLA
G	4	Gerald Brown	6 ft 4 in (1.93 m)	210 lb (95 kg)	1975–07–28	Pepperdine
G	3	Rex Chapman	6 ft 4 in (1.93 m)	185 lb (84 kg)	1967–10–05	Kentucky
F	8	Pat Garrity	6 ft 9 in (2.06 m)	238 lb (108 kg)	1976–08–23	Notre Dame
F/C	24	Tom Gugliotta	6 ft 10 in (2.08 m)	240 lb (109 kg)	1969–12–19	NC State
G	32	Jason Kidd	6 ft 4 in (1.93 m)	205 lb (93 kg)	1973–03–23	California
C	35	Joe Kleine	6 ft 11 in (2.11 m)	255 lb (116 kg)	1962–01–04	Arkansas
G	2	Randy Livingston	6 ft 4 in (1.93 m)	209 lb (95 kg)	1975–04–02	LSU
C	17	Horacio Llamas (injured)	6 ft 11 in (2.11 m)	285 lb (129 kg)	1973–07–17	Grand Canyon
C	13	Luc Longley	7 ft 2 in (2.18 m)	265 lb (120 kg)	1969–01–19	New Mexico
F/C	15	Danny Manning	6 ft 10 in (2.08 m)	230 lb (104 kg)	1966–05–17	Kansas
G/F	21	George McCloud	6 ft 6 in (1.98 m)	205 lb (93 kg)	1967–05–27	Florida State
F	20	Marko Milič (injured)	6 ft 6 in (1.98 m)	235 lb (107 kg)	1977–05–07	Slovenia
G/F	34	Chris Morris	6 ft 8 in (2.03 m)	210 lb (95 kg)	1966–01–20	Auburn
F	30	Clifford Robinson	6 ft 10 in (2.08 m)	225 lb (102 kg)	1966–12–16	Connecticut

Coaches
Head coach
- Danny Ainge
Assistant(s)
- Frank Johnson
- Roger Reid
- Scott Skiles

Legend
- (DP) Unsigned draft pick
- (FA) Free agent
- (S) Suspended
- Injured

== Regular season ==
=== Standings ===
Pacific Division	W	L	PCT	GB	Home	Road	Div
y-Portland Trail Blazers	35	15	.700	–	22–3	13–12	15–7
x-Los Angeles Lakers	31	19	.620	4	18–7	13–12	14–8
x-Sacramento Kings	27	23	.540	8	16–9	11–14	11–9
x-Phoenix Suns	27	23	.540	8	15–10	12–13	9–10
Seattle SuperSonics	25	25	.500	10	17–8	8–17	11–10
Golden State Warriors	21	29	.420	14	13–12	8–17	8–11
Los Angeles Clippers	9	41	.180	26	6–19	3–22	3–16

#	Western Conference				
#	Team	W	L	PCT	GB
1	z-San Antonio Spurs	37	13	.740	–
2	y-Portland Trail Blazers	35	15	.700	2
3	x-Utah Jazz	37	13	.740	–
4	x-Los Angeles Lakers	31	19	.620	6
5	x-Houston Rockets	31	19	.620	6
6	x-Sacramento Kings	27	23	.540	10
7	x-Phoenix Suns	27	23	.540	10
8	x-Minnesota Timberwolves	25	25	.500	12
9	Seattle SuperSonics	25	25	.500	12
10	Golden State Warriors	21	29	.420	16
11	Dallas Mavericks	19	31	.380	18
12	Denver Nuggets	14	36	.280	23
13	Los Angeles Clippers	9	41	.180	28
14	Vancouver Grizzlies	8	42	.160	29

== Playoffs ==
=== Game log ===
1999 playoff game log
First Round: 0–3 (home: 0–1; road: 0–2)

Game	Date	Team	Score	High points	High rebounds	High assists	Location Attendance	Series
1	May 8	@ Portland	L 85–95	Jason Kidd (17)	Tom Gugliotta (9)	Jason Kidd (7)	Rose Garden; 20,040	0–1
2	May 10	@ Portland	L 99–110	Garrity, McCloud (15)	Tom Gugliotta (9)	Jason Kidd (12)	Rose Garden; 20,588	0–2
3	May 12	Portland	L 93–103	Clifford Robinson (24)	Gugliotta, Robinson (7)	Jason Kidd (12)	America West Arena; 17,306	0–3

1999 schedule

== Awards and honors ==
=== Week/Month ===
- Jason Kidd was named Player of the Month for April.
- Jason Kidd was named Player of the Week for games played April 12 through April 18.

=== All-Star ===
All-Star weekend was cancelled due to the 1998–99 NBA lockout.

=== Season ===
- Jason Kidd was named to the All-NBA First Team. Kidd also finished fifth in MVP voting.
- Jason Kidd was named to the NBA All-Defensive First Team.
- Clifford Robinson finished seventh in Defensive Player of the Year voting, and finished tenth in Most Improved Player voting.
- Jason Kidd led the league in assists per game with a 10.8 average, and total assists with 539.
- Jason Kidd led the league in minutes played with 2060.

== Player statistics ==
Legend
GP	Games played	GS	Games started	MPG	Minutes per game
FG%	Field-goal percentage	3P%	3-point field-goal percentage	FT%	Free-throw percentage
RPG	Rebounds per game	APG	Assists per game	SPG	Steals per game
BPG	Blocks per game	PPG	Points per game

=== Season ===
Player	GP	GS	MPG	FG%	3P%	FT%	RPG	APG	SPG	BPG	PPG
Toby Bailey	27	10	9.2	.395	.200	.692	2.0	0.5	.3	.1	2.9
Gerald Brown	33	0	7.2	.371	.300	.786	0.7	0.9	.2	.0	2.4
Rex Chapman	38	35	31.1	.359	.351	.835#	2.7	2.9	.9	.2	12.1
Pat Garrity	39	9	13.8	.500†	.389	.714	1.9	0.5	.2	.1	5.6
Tom Gugliotta	43	43	36.3	.483	.286	.794	8.9	2.8	1.4	.5	17.0
Jason Kidd	50	50	41.2	.444	.366	.757	6.8	10.8	2.3	.4	16.9
Joe Kleine	31	5	12.1	.405	.000	.667	2.2	0.4	.3	.0	2.2
Randy Livingston	1	0	22.0	.625†	.	1.000#	2.0	3.0	2.0	.0	12.0
Luc Longley	39	39	23.9	.483	.	.776	5.7	1.2	.6	.5	8.7
Danny Manning	50	5	23.7	.484†	.111	.696	4.4	2.3	.7	.8	9.1
George McCloud	48	16	25.9	.438	.416	.862#	3.4	1.6	.9	.3	8.9
Marko Milič	11	0	4.8	.400	.000	.	0.5	0.2	.3	.1	1.5
Chris Morris	44	2	12.2	.430	.286	.870#	2.8	0.5	.4	.3	4.2
Jimmy Oliver	2	0	5.5	.333	1.000^	.	0.0	0.0	.0	.0	1.5
Shawn Respert	12	1	8.3	.361	.308	.700	1.1	0.7	.4	.0	3.1
Clifford Robinson	50	35	34.8	.475	.417^	.697	4.5	2.6	1.5	1.2	16.4
Alvin Sims	4	0	6.3	.400	1.000^	.400	1.0	1.3	.5	.0	2.8

† – Minimum 183 field goals made.
^ – Minimum 34 three-pointers made.
# – Minimum 76 free throws made.

=== Playoffs ===
Player	GP	GS	MPG	FG%	3P%	FT%	RPG	APG	SPG	BPG	PPG
Gerald Brown	1	0	1.0	1.000	.	.	0.0	0.0	.0	.0	2.0
Rex Chapman	3	3	19.0	.286	.333	.750	2.0	2.0	.3	.0	5.7
Pat Garrity	3	0	17.3	.529	1.000^	1.000#	3.0	0.3	.3	.3	9.0
Tom Gugliotta	3	3	39.3	.371	.	.750	8.3	3.3	1.3	1.0	10.7
Jason Kidd	3	3	42.0	.419	.250	.714	2.3	10.3	1.7	.3	15.0
Joe Kleine	1	0	5.0	.500	.	.	1.0	0.0	1.0	1.0	2.0
Randy Livingston	3	0	8.0	.400	.000	1.000#	2.3	0.7	.3	.0	5.3
Luc Longley	3	2	17.0	.167	.	.	3.0	0.3	1.0	.0	1.3
Danny Manning	3	1	26.3	.583	.	.769#	1.7	2.0	1.3	.0	12.7
George McCloud	3	0	26.7	.433	.450^	.700	4.3	0.7	1.7	.0	14.0
Chris Morris	1	0	10.0	1.000	1.000^	.000	1.0	0.0	.0	.0	5.0
Clifford Robinson	3	3	39.0	.475	.222	.636	5.3	2.7	2.0	.3	15.7

^ – Minimum 5 three-pointers made.
# – Minimum 10 free throws made.

Player statistics citation:

== Transactions ==
=== Trades ===
June 24, 1998	To Los Angeles Lakers Future considerations	To Phoenix Suns Rights to (United States) Toby Bailey
June 24, 1998	To Dallas Mavericks (United States) Steve Nash	To Phoenix Suns (Estonia) Martin Müürsepp (United States) Bubba Wells Rights to (United States) Pat Garrity 1999 first-round draft pick ( (United States) Shawn Marion)
January 23, 1999	To Chicago Bulls (United States) Mark Bryant (Estonia) Martin Müürsepp (United States) Bubba Wells 1999 first-round draft pick ( (United States) Ron Artest)	To Phoenix Suns (Australia) Luc Longley

=== Free agents ===
==== Additions ====
Date	Player	Contract	Former Team
January 22, 1999	George McCloud	Re-signed to 1-year contract for $750,000	Phoenix Suns
January 22, 1999	Horacio Llamas	Re-signed to 1-year contract for $425,000	Phoenix Suns
January 22, 1999	James Collins	Undisclosed	Jacksonville Barracudas (USBL)
January 22, 1999	Joe Kleine	Signed to 1-year contract for $1 million	Phoenix Suns
January 22, 1999	Marko Milič	Re-signed to 1-year contract for $350,000	Phoenix Suns
January 22, 1999	Tom Gugliotta	Signed to 6-year contract for $58.5 million	Minnesota Timberwolves
January 24, 1999	Jamie Feick	Undisclosed	Milwaukee Bucks
January 25, 1999	Clifford Robinson	Re-signed to 1-year contract for $3.5 million	Portland Trail Blazers
January 25, 1999	Gerald Brown	Signed to 1-year contract for $287,500	
January 25, 1999	Rex Chapman	Re-signed to 6-year contract for $22.1 million	Phoenix Suns
January 29, 1999	Shawn Respert	Signed to 1-year contract	Phoenix Suns
February 3, 1999	Chris Morris	Signed to 1-year contract for $1 million	Utah Jazz
March 3, 1999	Jimmy Oliver	Signed 10-day contract	Ducato Siena (Italy)
April 28, 1999	Alvin Sims	Signed for rest of season	
May 4, 1999	Randy Livingston	Signed for rest of season	Atlanta Hawks

==== Subtractions ====
Date	Player	Reason left	New team
May 18, 1998	Kevin Johnson	Renounced rights	Phoenix Suns
January 21, 1999	Mike Brown	Free agent	Olympiacos (Greece)
January 22, 1999	Antonio McDyess	Free agent	Denver Nuggets
January 22, 1999	Loren Meyer	Free agent	Denver Nuggets
January 22, 1999	John "Hot Rod" Williams	Free agent	Dallas Mavericks
January 24, 1999	Dennis Scott	Free agent	New York Knicks
January 29, 1999	Jamie Feick	Waived	Milwaukee Bucks
February 2, 1999	James Collins	Waived	La Crosse Bobcats (CBA)
March 2, 1999	Shawn Respert	Waived	Adecco Milano (Italy)
April 7, 1999	Jimmy Oliver	Waived	Iraklio (Greece)
May 4, 1999	Alvin Sims	Waived	

Player Transactions Citation:
