= George McCloud =

American basketball player (born 1967)

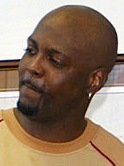
- McCloud in 2002

Personal information
- Born: May 27, 1967 (age 59) Daytona Beach, Florida, U.S.
- Listed height: 6 ft 8 in (2.03 m)
- Listed weight: 230 lb (104 kg)

Career information
- High school: Mainland (Daytona Beach, Florida)
- College: Florida State (1985–1989)
- NBA draft: 1989: 1st round, 7th overall pick
- Drafted by: Indiana Pacers
- Playing career: 1989–2002
- Position: Small forward
- Number: 20, 21, 24

Career history
- 1989–1993: Indiana Pacers
- 1993–1994: Scavolini Pesaro
- 1994–1995: Rapid City Thrillers
- 1995–1997: Dallas Mavericks
- 1997: Los Angeles Lakers
- 1997–1999: Phoenix Suns
- 1999: Tampa Bay Windjammers
- 1999–2002: Denver Nuggets

Career highlights
- Third-team All-American – AP, NABC, UPI (1989); Metro Conference Player of the Year (1989); 2× First-team All-Metro Conference (1988, 1989); No. 21 jersey honored by Florida State Seminoles

Career NBA statistics
- Points: 6,925 (9.0 ppg)
- Rebounds: 2,342 (3.1 rpg)
- Assists: 1,769 (2.3 apg)
- Stats at NBA.com
- Stats at Basketball Reference

George Aaron McCloud (born May 27, 1967) is an American former professional basketball player who played eleven seasons in the National Basketball Association (NBA).

== Early life ==
McCloud attended Mainland High School in Daytona Beach and Florida State University in Tallahassee. While at Florida State, McCloud was among the most discussed NBA prospects in the school's history.

== Professional career ==
McCloud was selected by the Indiana Pacers in the 1st round (7th overall) of the 1989 NBA draft. The 6-foot-6-inch (1.98 m) guard–forward averaged 5.5 points per game overall for the Pacers, perhaps peaking in the 1992 NBA Playoffs as he averaged 11.5 points and 3 assists per game as the Pacers lost to the Boston Celtics in the first round. Earlier that season, McCloud was suspended for one game and fined for a postgame fight with Cleveland's John Battle. He was released after four seasons and played basketball in Italy during the 1993–94 season. He signed with the Dallas Mavericks midway through the 1994–95 seasons.

During the 1995-96 season as a member of the Mavericks, appearing in 79 games and averaging 18.9 ppg while setting the NBA record for most 3-point attempts in a season. In his NBA career, McCloud played in 766 games and scored a total of 6,925 points. McCloud was a productive three point shooter throughout his career. At NBA All-Star Weekend in 1996, he appeared in the Three-point Shootout but lost in the semifinal round. McCloud has the second-highest total for three-point attempts in an NBA game, with 20 (making seven of them) in a game for the Dallas Mavericks against the New Jersey Nets on March 5, 1996. During the 1998 NBA Playoffs, then on the Suns, McCloud averaged a postseason-best 14.3 points per game as Phoenix lost to the San Antonio Spurs in the first round.

In total, McCloud played a total of 12 years in the NBA from 1989 to 2002. He also played for the Los Angeles Lakers and Denver Nuggets.

== Career stats ==
Legend
GP	Games played	GS	Games started	MPG	Minutes per game
FG%	Field goal percentage	3P%	3-point field goal percentage	FT%	Free throw percentage
RPG	Rebounds per game	APG	Assists per game	SPG	Steals per game
BPG	Blocks per game	PPG	Points per game	**Bold**	Career high

=== NBA ===
==== Regular season ====
Year	Team	GP	GS	MPG	FG%	3P%	FT%	RPG	APG	SPG	BPG	PPG
1989–90	Indiana	44	0	9.4	.313	.325	.789	1.0	1.0	.4	.1	2.7
1990–91	Indiana	74	0	14.5	.373	.347	.776	1.6	2.0	.5	.1	4.6
1991–92	Indiana	51	5	17.5	.409	.340	.781	2.6	2.3	.5	.2	6.6
1992–93	Indiana	78	21	19.2	.411	.320	.735	2.6	2.5	.7	.1	7.2
1994–95	Dallas	42	3	19.1	**.439**	.382	.833	3.5	1.3	.5	.2	9.6
1995–96	Dallas	**79**	**63**	**36.0**	.414	.379	.804	**4.8**	2.7	**1.4**	**.5**	**18.9**
1996–97	Dallas	41	26	29.4	.423	.380	.837	3.5	2.2	1.3	.2	13.7
1996–97	L.A. Lakers	23	2	12.4	.354	**.429**	.667	1.6	.7	.4	.0	4.1
1997–98	Phoenix	63	13	19.3	.405	.341	.765	3.5	1.3	.9	.2	7.2
1998–99	Phoenix	48	16	25.9	.438	.416	**.862**	3.4	1.6	.9	.3	8.9
1999–00	Denver	78	11	27.2	.417	.378	.818	3.7	3.2	.6	.3	10.1
2000–01	Denver	76	8	26.4	.382	.329	.840	2.9	**3.7**	.7	.4	9.6
2001–02	Denver	69	26	26.5	.358	.270	.810	3.6	3.0	.8	.3	8.8
Career		766	194	22.8	.402	.358	.810	3.1	2.3	.8	.2	9.0

==== Playoffs ====
Year	Team	GP	GS	MPG	FG%	3P%	FT%	RPG	APG	SPG	BPG	PPG
1990	Indiana	1	0	4.0	.500	–	–	1.0	.0	.0	.0	2.0
1992	Indiana	2	2	26.5	.500	.500	.727	1.0	3.0	1.0	**.5**	11.5
1993	Indiana	**4**	0	19.8	.348	.167	.250	2.8	**3.5**	1.0	.3	4.8
1998	Phoenix	**4**	**3**	**31.5**	**.512**	**.571**	**.750**	**4.8**	2.0	.3	.3	**14.3**
1999	Phoenix	3	0	26.7	.433	.450	.700	4.3	.7	**1.7**	.0	14.0
Career		14	5	24.4	.454	.441	.655	3.3	2.1	.9	.2	10.2
