= Tom Gugliotta =

American basketball player (born 1969)

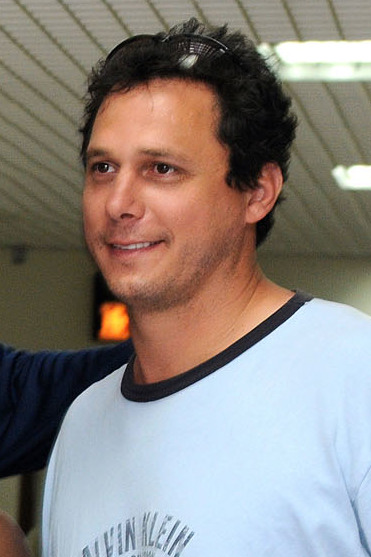
- Gugliotta in 2008

Personal information
- Born: December 19, 1969 (age 56) Huntington Station, New York, U.S.
- Listed height: 6 ft 10 in (2.08 m)
- Listed weight: 250 lb (113 kg)

Career information
- High school: Walt Whitman (Huntington Station, New York)
- College: NC State (1988–1992)
- NBA draft: 1992: 1st round, 6th overall pick
- Drafted by: Washington Bullets
- Playing career: 1992–2005
- Position: Power forward / small forward
- Number: 24, 8, 42, 7

Career history
- 1992–1994: Washington Bullets
- 1994–1995: Golden State Warriors
- 1995–1998: Minnesota Timberwolves
- 1999–2004: Phoenix Suns
- 2004: Utah Jazz
- 2004–2005: Boston Celtics
- 2005: Atlanta Hawks

Career highlights
- NBA All-Star (1997); NBA All-Rookie First Team (1993); Third-team All-American – NABC (1992); First-team All-ACC (1992); Second-team All-ACC (1991); No. 24 jersey honored by NC State Wolfpack

Career NBA statistics
- Points: 9,895 (13.0 ppg)
- Rebounds: 5,589 (7.3 rpg)
- Steals: 1,079 (1.4 spg)
- Stats at NBA.com
- Stats at Basketball Reference
Medals
Men's basketball
Representing United States
FIBA Americas Championship
Gold medal – first place	1999 San Juan	National team

Thomas James Gugliotta (born December 19, 1969) is an American former professional basketball player. Drafted with the sixth pick in the 1992 NBA draft, he played thirteen seasons in the National Basketball Association (NBA). A 6'10 power forward, he was an All-Star in 1997 as a player of the Minnesota Timberwolves. Gugliotta was formerly an All-American college player for the NC State Wolfpack.

== Early life ==
Gugliotta was born in Huntington Station on New York's Long Island. He is the youngest of seven children, and has far Italian descents (from Sicily). He attended Walt Whitman High School. His two older brothers, Frank Jr. and Charlie, both enjoyed limited collegiate success on the hardwood and played professionally in Europe. His father called an old friend, Jim Valvano at North Carolina State University, during his senior season and told Valvano that his youngest son was going to be a special basketball player. Valvano took a chance on Gugliotta and brought him to Raleigh.

== College career ==
During his freshman season, Gugliotta, nicknamed "Googs", was limited by a knee injury. However, he emerged in the second half of the ACC season as a member of the rotation for the Wolfpack and appeared in 28 games, averaging two points and 1.3 rebounds per game. During the offseason, Valvano began telling crowds at Wolfpack Club meetings that Gugliotta was beginning to blossom. Emerging as a taller, heavier sophomore, Gugliotta averaged 11.1 points and seven rebounds a game. As a junior, Gugliotta began to show his star potential, averaging more than 15 points and nine rebounds per game. As a senior, he averaged more than 22 points and almost 10 rebounds per game.

== NBA career ==
Gugliotta was drafted in 1992 out of NC State with the sixth overall pick by the National Basketball Association's Washington Bullets. On November 21, 1992, Gugliotta scored a career-best 39 points during a win over the Utah Jazz. At the end of the season, he was named to the NBA All-Rookie Team.

In 1994, Gugliotta was traded, alongside draft considerations, to the Golden State Warriors for Chris Webber. Halfway through the season, Gugliotta was traded to the Minnesota Timberwolves for rookie Donyell Marshall. His best years were with the Minnesota Timberwolves, scoring 20.6 and 20.1 ppg in the 1996–1997 and 1997–1998 seasons and being named an All-Star in 1997.

Gugliotta signed with the Phoenix Suns in 1999. In 2004, he was traded to the Utah Jazz with two first-round picks for Keon Clark and Ben Handlogten. In 2004, he signed with the Boston Celtics, and was traded with Michael Stewart and Gary Payton at the trade deadline to the Atlanta Hawks for Antoine Walker. After the season, Gugliotta retired.

In total, Gugliotta played in 13 NBA seasons and averaged 13.0 points per game, 7.3 rebounds per game, and 2.8 assists per game over 763 regular season games, though he appeared in only 12 playoff games.

== Personal life ==
Gugliotta met his wife, Nikki, at North Carolina State and the two have a daughter, Greer. The couple later divorced.

He was inducted into the Suffolk Sports Hall of Fame on Long Island in the Basketball Category with the Class of 1994.

=== Accident ===
On December 17, 1999, Gugliotta nearly died from taking a then-legal supplement. Having trouble sleeping after games, he took a supplement marketed as a "sleep aid" which included furanon di-hydro, also known as gamma butyrolactone, or GBL. He was talking to his wife on his phone while on the team bus when he collapsed and stopped breathing. His wife heard the commotion and called the wife of teammate Rex Chapman, who was able to call Chapman on the bus and instruct him to check Gugliotta's bag for the supplement bottle and alert the EMTs and hospital as to the cause of the reaction.

== NBA career statistics ==
Legend
GP	Games played	GS	Games started	MPG	Minutes per game
FG%	Field goal percentage	3P%	3-point field goal percentage	FT%	Free throw percentage
RPG	Rebounds per game	APG	Assists per game	SPG	Steals per game
BPG	Blocks per game	PPG	Points per game	**Bold**	Career high

=== Regular season ===
Year	Team	GP	GS	MPG	FG%	3P%	FT%	RPG	APG	SPG	BPG	PPG
1992–93	Washington	**81**	**81**	34.5	.426	.281	.644	**9.6**	3.8	1.7	0.4	14.7
1993–94	Washington	78	78	35.8	.466	.270	.685	9.3	3.5	2.2	0.7	17.1
1994–95	Washington	6	6	37.7	.398	**.500**	.788	8.8	3.0	**3.5**	**1.8**	16.0
1994–95	Golden State	40	40	33.1	.443	.311	.567	7.4	3.1	1.3	0.6	10.9
1994–95	Minnesota	31	17	32.8	.454	.318	.762	7.2	**4.5**	2.0	0.9	14.4
1995–96	Minnesota	78	78	36.3	.471	.302	.773	8.8	3.1	1.8	1.2	16.2
1996–97	Minnesota	**81**	**81**	**38.7**	.442	.258	.820	8.7	4.1	1.6	1.1	**20.6**
1997–98	Minnesota	41	41	38.6	**.502**	.118	.821	8.7	4.1	1.5	0.5	20.1
1998–99	Phoenix	43	43	36.3	.483	.286	.794	8.9	2.8	1.4	0.5	17.4
1999–00	Phoenix	54	54	32.7	.481	.125	.775	7.9	2.3	1.5	0.6	13.7
2000–01	Phoenix	57	2	20.3	.392	.250	.792	4.5	1.0	0.8	0.4	6.4
2001–02	Phoenix	44	40	25.7	.422	.333	.757	5.0	1.8	0.9	0.7	6.5
2002–03	Phoenix	27	11	16.6	.455	.000	**1.000**	3.7	1.1	0.5	0.2	4.8
2003–04	Phoenix	30	3	10.1	.313	.000	.750	1.9	0.7	0.5	0.1	2.3
2003–04	Utah	25	24	20.6	.375	.333	.700	5.2	1.7	0.7	0.3	3.7
2004–05	Boston	20	0	10.9	.297	–	.667	2.2	0.6	0.5	0.6	1.3
2004–05	Atlanta	27	9	27.7	.431	.308	.784	5.5	2.1	1.2	0.5	7.9
Career		763	608	30.9	.451	.284	.784	7.3	2.8	1.4	0.6	13.0
All-Star		1	0	19.0	.429	.000	.750	8.0	3.0	2.0	–	9.0

==== Playoffs ====
Year	Team	GP	GS	MPG	FG%	3P%	FT%	RPG	APG	SPG	BPG	PPG
1997	Minnesota	3	**3**	**40.3**	**.422**	**.750**	.600	5.3	**4.3**	**2.3**	0.7	**18.3**
1999	Phoenix	3	**3**	39.3	.371	–	.750	**8.3**	3.3	1.3	**1.0**	10.7
2001	Phoenix	**4**	0	21.5	.308	–	**.778**	3.8	0.8	2.0	0.3	5.8
2003	Phoenix	2	0	5.0	.500	–	.500	1.0	0.0	0.0	0.0	2.5
Career		12	6	27.9	.393	.750	.690	4.8	2.2	1.6	0.5	9.6

== See also ==
- List of All-Atlantic Coast Conference men's basketball teams
