= 1998–99 Sacramento Kings season =

NBA professional basketball team season

- Head coach: Rick Adelman
- President: Geoff Petrie
- General manager: Geoff Petrie
- Owners: Jim Thomas; Maloof family
- Arena: ARCO Arena

Results
- Record: 27–23 (.540)
- Place: Division: 3rd (Pacific); Conference: 6th (Western)
- Playoff finish: First round (lost to Jazz 2–3)
- Stats at Basketball Reference

Local media
- Television: KMAX-TV; Fox Sports Bay Area
- Radio: KHTK

The 1998–99 Sacramento Kings season was the 50th season for the Sacramento Kings in the National Basketball Association, and their 14th season in Sacramento, California. Due to a lockout, the regular season began on February 5, 1999, and was cut from 82 games to 50. The Kings went 27-23 in the shortened season, notching their first winning record since 1982-83, when they were still based in Kansas City.

== Season summary ==
=== Off-season ===
The Kings received the seventh overall pick in the 1998 NBA draft, and selected point guard Jason Williams from the University of Florida; Williams would earn the nickname "White Chocolate", and would also be known for his flashy passes and crossovers. During the off-season, the team acquired All-Star forward Chris Webber from the Washington Wizards, and signed free agents Vlade Divac, Vernon Maxwell, three-point specialist Jon Barry, and second-year center Scot Pollard, who was signed midway through the season while Terry Dehere was released to free agency. After playing overseas in Greece, Serbian small forward Peja Stojaković, who was drafted by the Kings as the 14th overall pick in the 1996 NBA draft, made his debut in the NBA this season. The Kings also hired Rick Adelman as their new head coach; Adelman led the Portland Trail Blazers to two trips to the NBA Finals between 1990 and 1992.

For the season, the Kings revealed new purple alternate road uniforms, which featured a black and white trim, and a black side panel on the right leg of their shorts; these uniforms would remain in use until 2002.

=== Regular season ===
Under Adelman and with the addition of Webber, Divac, Williams, Maxwell and Stojaković, the Kings got off to a 9–9 start to the regular season, but played below .500 in winning percentage as the season progressed, holding a 17–22 record as of April 15, 1999. However, the team improved by winning ten of their final eleven games of the season, which included two five-game winning streaks between April and May. The Kings finished in third place in the Pacific Division with a 27–23 record, which was their first winning record above .500 in 16 years, as the team earned the sixth seed in the Western Conference.

Webber averaged 20.0 points, a league-high 13.0 rebounds, 4.1 assists, 1.4 steals and 2.1 blocks per game, and was named to the All-NBA Second Team, while Divac averaged 14.3 points, 10.0 rebounds and 4.3 assists per game, and Williams provided the team with 12.8 points, 6.0 assists and 1.9 steals per game, led them with 100 three-point field goals, and was named to the NBA All-Rookie First Team. In addition, Corliss Williamson provided with 13.2 points per game, and second-year guard Tariq Abdul-Wahad contributed 9.3 points per game. Off the bench, Maxwell contributed 10.7 points per game and 80 three-point field goals, while second-year forward Lawrence Funderburke averaged 8.9 points and 4.7 rebounds per game, Stojaković provided with 8.4 points per game, and Barry contributed 5.0 points and 2.6 assists per game.

Webber finished in seventh place in Most Valuable Player voting, while Williams finished in second place in Rookie of the Year voting, behind Vince Carter of the Toronto Raptors. The Kings finished 15th in the NBA in home-game attendance, with an attendance of 418,751 at the ARCO Arena II during the regular season.

=== NBA playoffs ===
In the Western Conference First Round of the 1999 NBA playoffs, the Kings faced off against the 3rd–seeded Utah Jazz, who were led by the trio of All-Star forward, and Most Valuable Player of the Year, Karl Malone, All-Star guard John Stockton, and Jeff Hornacek. With the series tied at 1–1, the Kings managed to win Game 3 over the Jazz at home in overtime, 84–81 at the ARCO Arena II to take a 2–1 series lead. However, the Kings lost Game 4 at home by a score of 90–89, which evened the series, before losing Game 5 to the Jazz on the road in overtime, 99–92 at the Delta Center, thus losing in a hard-fought five-game series.

=== Aftermath ===
Following the season, Abdul-Wahad was traded to the Orlando Magic, and Maxwell signed as a free agent with the Seattle SuperSonics.

== Draft picks ==
Round	Pick	Player	Position	Nationality	College
1	7	Jason Williams	PG	United States	Florida
2	36	Jerome James	C	United States	Florida A&M

== Roster ==
1998–99 Sacramento Kings roster
Players

Pos.	No.	Player	Height	Weight	DOB	From
G	9	Tariq Abdul-Wahad	6 ft 6 in (1.98 m)	205 lb (93 kg)	1974–11–03	San José State
G	20	Jon Barry	6 ft 4 in (1.93 m)	195 lb (88 kg)	1969–07–25	Georgia Tech
C	21	Vlade Divac	7 ft 1 in (2.16 m)	243 lb (110 kg)	1968–02–03	Serbia
F	51	Lawrence Funderburke	6 ft 9 in (2.06 m)	230 lb (104 kg)	1970–12–15	Ohio State
G	7	Michael Hawkins	5 ft 11 in (1.80 m)	170 lb (77 kg)	1972–10–28	Xavier
C	53	Jerome James	7 ft 0 in (2.13 m)	300 lb (136 kg)	1975–11–17	Florida A&M
G	3	Vernon Maxwell	6 ft 4 in (1.93 m)	180 lb (82 kg)	1965–09–12	Florida
C	8	Oliver Miller	6 ft 9 in (2.06 m)	280 lb (127 kg)	1970–04–06	Arkansas
F/C	31	Scot Pollard	6 ft 11 in (2.11 m)	265 lb (120 kg)	1975–02–12	Kansas
G	5	Chris Robinson (IN)	6 ft 5 in (1.96 m)	200 lb (91 kg)	1974–04–02	Western Kentucky
F	16	Peja Stojaković	6 ft 9 in (2.06 m)	220 lb (100 kg)	1977–06–09	Serbia
F/C	4	Chris Webber	6 ft 10 in (2.08 m)	245 lb (111 kg)	1973–03–01	Michigan
G	55	Jason Williams	6 ft 1 in (1.85 m)	190 lb (86 kg)	1975–11–18	Florida
F	34	Corliss Williamson	6 ft 7 in (2.01 m)	245 lb (111 kg)	1973–12–04	Arkansas

Coaches
Head coach
- Rick Adelman
Assistant(s)
- Pete Carril
- Byron Scott
- John Wetzel

Legend
- (DP) Unsigned draft pick
- (FA) Free agent
- (S) Suspended
- (IN) Inactive
- Injured

Roster
Updated: February 24, 1999

=== Roster Notes ===
- Shooting guard Chris Robinson was placed on the inactive list, and did not play for the Kings this season.

== Regular season ==
=== Season standings ===
Pacific Division	W	L	PCT	GB	Home	Road	Div
y-Portland Trail Blazers	35	15	.700	–	22–3	13–12	15–7
x-Los Angeles Lakers	31	19	.620	4	18–7	13–12	14–8
x-Sacramento Kings	27	23	.540	8	16–9	11–14	11–9
x-Phoenix Suns	27	23	.540	8	15–10	12–13	9–10
Seattle SuperSonics	25	25	.500	10	17–8	8–17	11–10
Golden State Warriors	21	29	.420	14	13–12	8–17	8–11
Los Angeles Clippers	9	41	.180	26	6–19	3–22	3–16

#	Western Conference				
#	Team	W	L	PCT	GB
1	z-San Antonio Spurs	37	13	.740	–
2	y-Portland Trail Blazers	35	15	.700	2
3	x-Utah Jazz	37	13	.740	–
4	x-Los Angeles Lakers	31	19	.620	6
5	x-Houston Rockets	31	19	.620	6
6	x-Sacramento Kings	27	23	.540	10
7	x-Phoenix Suns	27	23	.540	10
8	x-Minnesota Timberwolves	25	25	.500	12
9	Seattle SuperSonics	25	25	.500	12
10	Golden State Warriors	21	29	.420	16
11	Dallas Mavericks	19	31	.380	18
12	Denver Nuggets	14	36	.280	23
13	Los Angeles Clippers	9	41	.180	28
14	Vancouver Grizzlies	8	42	.160	29

z – clinched division title
y – clinched division title
x – clinched playoff spot

=== Game log ===
1998–99 game log
Total: 27–23 (home: 16–9; road: 11–14)
February: 6–7 (home: 3–0; road: 3–7)

Game	Date	Team	Score	High points	High rebounds	High assists	Location Attendance	Record
1	February 5	@ San Antonio	L 83–101	Jason Williams (21)	Chris Webber (12)	Williams, Webber, Abdul-Wahad (3)	Alamodome; 19,002	0–1
2	February 7	Vancouver	W 109–87	Chris Webber (25)	Vlade Divac (16)	Vlade Divac (10)	ARCO Arena; 17,317	1–1
3	February 9	@ Phoenix	W 112–95	Chris Webber (28)	Chris Webber (20)	Vlade Divac (7)	America West Arena; 18,217	2–1
4	February 10	@ Houston	L 82–92	Chris Webber (21)	Chris Webber (19)	Tariq Abdul-Wahad (5)	Compaq Center; 16,285	2–2
5	February 15	@ Utah	L 112–120 (OT)	Chris Webber (26)	Chris Webber (11)	Jason Williams (7)	Delta Center; 19,911	2–3
6	February 16	Boston	W 101–98	Webber, Williamson (22)	Chris Webber (15)	Vlade Divac (8)	ARCO Arena; 16,576	3–3
7	February 17	@ Seattle	W 109–106 (OT)	Chris Webber (23)	Webber, Divac (14)	Jason Williams (5)	KeyArena; 17,072	4–3
8	February 19	Charlotte	W 106–95	Jason Williams (25)	Chris Webber (14)	Jon Barry (5)	ARCO Arena; 17,317	5–3
9	February 21	@ Minnesota	L 90–102	Chris Webber (20)	Lawrence Funderburke (12)	Jason Williams (8)	Target Center; 16,848	5–4
10	February 22	@ Orlando	L 96–107	Chris Webber (22)	Chris Webber (13)	Jason Williams (7)	Orlando Arena; 16,542	5–5
11	February 24	@ Philadelphia	L 81–94	Chris Webber (21)	Chris Webber (11)	Jason Williams (7)	First Union Center; 14,437	5–6
12	February 25	@ Washington	W 115–105	Vlade Divac (22)	Vlade Divac (17)	Chris Webber (10)	MCI Center; 16,813	6–6
13	February 27	@ Dallas	L 90–97	Vlade Divac (20)	Chris Webber (14)	Jason Williams (7)	Reunion Arena; 15,009	6–7

March: 8–11 (home: 4–6; road: 4–5)

Game	Date	Team	Score	High points	High rebounds	High assists	Location Attendance	Record
14	March 1	Seattle	L 102–105	Chris Webber (20)	Chris Webber (14)	Jason Williams (10)	ARCO Arena; 16,786	6–8
15	March 2	@ Vancouver	W 111–101	Chris Webber (36)	Chris Webber (17)	Jason Williams (9)	General Motors Place; 13,252	7–8
16	March 3	Portland	L 93–97 (OT)	Chris Webber (20)	Chris Webber (14)	Chris Webber (6)	ARCO Arena; 15,160	7–9
17	March 6	@ Phoenix	W 111–99	Jason Williams (24)	Chris Webber (14)	Webber, Williams (6)	America West Arena; 19,023	8–9
18	March 7	Dallas	W 94–89	Chris Webber (18)	Chris Webber (13)	Chris Webber (7)	ARCO Arena; 14,715	9–9
19	March 9	@ Portland	L 98–103	Lawrence Funderburke (18)	Vlade Divac (16)	Webber, Maxwell (5)	Rose Garden; 18,147	9–10
20	March 11	@ L.A. Clippers	L 92–106	Vlade Divac (19)	Chris Webber (9)	Jason Williams (4)	Los Angeles Memorial Sports Arena; 7,884	9–11
21	March 12	Minnesota	L 95–101	Jason Williams (17)	Chris Webber (10)	Jason Williams (5)	ARCO Arena; 17,317	9–12
22	March 14	L.A. Lakers	W 105–101	Jason Williams (21)	Chris Webber (11)	Williams, Divac (5)	ARCO Arena; 17,317	10–12
23	March 15	@ Golden State	W 111–105	Chris Webber (20)	Vlade Divac (8)	Webber, Divac (6)	The Arena in Oakland; 17,317	11–12
24	March 16	San Antonio	L 109–121	Vlade Divac (18)	Chris Webber (14)	Jason Williams (10)	ARCO Arena; 14,570	11–13
25	March 18	Portland	L 78–88	Chris Webber (16)	Chris Webber (20)	Jason Williams (5)	ARCO Arena; 14,397	11–14
26	March 20	@ Dallas	L 90–104	Tariq Abdul-Wahad (16)	Chris Webber (16)	Vlade Divac (6)	Reunion Arena; 16,161	11–15
27	March 22	@ Houston	L 100–110	Chris Webber (29)	Chris Webber (11)	Chris Webber (6)	Compaq Center; 16,285	11–16
28	March 24	New York	W 92–91	Vernon Maxwell (19)	Chris Webber (9)	Vlade Divac (10)	ARCO Arena; 17,023	12–16
29	March 26	@ L.A. Lakers	W 111–109	Chris Webber (29)	Webber, Divac (10)	Jason Williams (12)	Great Western Forum; 17,505	13–16
30	March 28	Houston	L 93–107	Jason Williams (21)	Lawrence Funderburke (15)	Vlade Divac (5)	ARCO Arena; 17,317	13–17
31	March 30	Utah	W 104–101 (OT)	Vernon Maxwell (33)	Vlade Divac (13)	Michael Hawkins (7)	ARCO Arena; 17,317	14–17
32	March 31	@ Portland	L 86–100	Vlade Divac (20)	Vlade Divac (12)	Vlade Divac (7)	Rose Garden; 18,468	14–18

April: 10–5 (home: 7–3; road: 3–2)

Game	Date	Team	Score	High points	High rebounds	High assists	Location Attendance	Record
33	April 3	@ Minnesota	L 96–105	Vlade Divac (19)	Chris Webber (10)	Vlade Divac (9)	Target Center; 17,011	14–19
34	April 6	@ Seattle	W 112–106 (OT)	Jason Williams (21)	Vlade Divac (14)	Vlade Divac (10)	KeyArena; 17,072	15–19
35	April 7	L.A. Lakers	L 89–104	Corliss Williamson (22)	Chris Webber (16)	Webber, Stojaković (6)	ARCO Arena; 17,317	15–20
36	April 10	Denver	W 110–104	Chris Webber (23)	Vlade Divac (15)	Jason Williams (9)	ARCO Arena; 17,317	16–20
37	April 11	@ Vancouver	W 91–88	Chris Webber (24)	Chris Webber (10)	Jason Williams (7)	General Motors Place; 17,167	17–20
38	April 13	Utah	L 100–105 (OT)	Corliss Williamson (22)	Chris Webber (16)	Chris Webber (8)	ARCO Arena; 17,317	17–21
39	April 15	Seattle	L 98–99 (OT)	Chris Webber (26)	Chris Webber (21)	Jason Williams (13)	ARCO Arena; 17,317	17–22
40	April 17	Denver	W 119–97	Corliss Williamson (29)	Vlade Divac (14)	Jason Williams (11)	ARCO Arena; 16,285	18–22
41	April 19	@ L.A. Clippers	W 102–98	Corliss Williamson (23)	Tariq Abdul-Wahad (9)	Jason Williams (14)	Arrowhead Pond of Anaheim; 10,878	19–22
42	April 21	Golden State	W 103–94	Chris Webber (25)	Chris Webber (16)	Webber, Williams (5)	ARCO Arena; 17,087	20–22
43	April 23	Minnesota	W 105–97	Jason Williams (27)	Chris Webber (19)	Webber, Williams, Stojaković (4)	ARCO Arena; 17,317	21–22
44	April 24	Dallas	W 105–102	Vlade Divac (28)	Vlade Divac (9)	Jason Williams (7)	ARCO Arena; 17,317	22–22
45	April 26	@ Golden State	L 89–114	Stojaković, Funderburke (17)	Vlade Divac (10)	Vlade Divac (5)	The Arena in Oakland; 16,111	22–23
46	April 27	San Antonio	W 104–100 (OT)	Vlade Divac (27)	Vlade Divac (15)	Jason Williams (7)	ARCO Arena; 16,776	23–23
47	April 29	L.A. Clippers	W 103–81	Tariq Abdul-Wahad (19)	Divac, Pollard (11)	Jon Barry (9)	ARCO Arena; 16,938	24–23

May: 3–0 (home: 2–0; road: 1–0)

Game	Date	Team	Score	High points	High rebounds	High assists	Location Attendance	Record
48	May 2	Phoenix	W 111–100	Jason Williams (24)	Chris Webber (13)	Jason Williams (5)	ARCO Arena; 17,317	25–23
49	May 3	@ Denver	W 112–104	Vlade Divac (25)	Scot Pollard (10)	Jason Williams (9)	McNichols Sports Arena; 14,653	26–23
50	May 5	Vancouver	W 99–95	Vlade Divac (29)	Vlade Divac (17)	Jon Barry (5)	ARCO Arena; 17,317	27–23

1998–99 schedule

== Playoffs ==
1999 playoff game log
First round: 2–3 (home: 1–1; road: 1–2)

Game	Date	Team	Score	High points	High rebounds	High assists	Location Attendance	Series
1	May 8	@ Utah	L 87–117	Chris Webber (14)	Chris Webber (9)	Chris Webber (3)	Delta Center; 19,911	0–1
2	May 10	@ Utah	W 101–90	Chris Webber (20)	Vlade Divac (7)	Vlade Divac (8)	Delta Center; 19,911	1–1
3	May 12	Utah	W 84–81 (OT)	Vlade Divac (22)	Vlade Divac (14)	Jason Williams (6)	ARCO Arena; 17,317	2–1
4	May 14	Utah	L 89–90	Chris Webber (18)	Vlade Divac (14)	Jason Williams (6)	ARCO Arena; 17,317	2–2
5	May 16	@ Utah	L 92–99 (OT)	Vernon Maxwell (22)	Chris Webber (14)	Vlade Divac (5)	Delta Center; 19,911	2–3

1999 schedule

== Player statistics ==
Legend
GP	Games played	GS	Games started	MPG	Minutes per game
FG%	Field-goal percentage	3P%	3-point field-goal percentage	FT%	Free-throw percentage
RPG	Rebounds per game	APG	Assists per game	SPG	Steals per game
BPG	Blocks per game	PPG	Points per game

=== Season ===
Player	GP	GS	MPG	FG%	3P%	FT%	RPG	APG	SPG	BPG	PPG
Tariq Abdul-Wahad	49	49	24.6	.435	.286	.691	3.8	1.0	1.0	0.3	9.3
Peter Aluma^{‡}	2	0	2.5	.500			1.0	0.0	0.5	0.5	1.0
Jon Barry	43	0	17.1	.428	.304	.845	2.2	2.6	1.2	0.1	5.0
Terry Dehere^{‡}	4	0	5.0	.364	.200		0.5	0.3	0.5	0.0	2.3
Vlade Divac	50	50	35.2	.470	.256	.702	10.0	4.3	0.9	1.0	14.3
Lawrence Funderburke	47	2	19.9	.559	.200	.708	4.7	0.6	0.5	0.5	8.9
Michael Hawkins	24	0	8.5	.350	.263	1.000	1.0	1.1	0.1	0.0	1.5
Jerome James	16	0	2.6	.375		.500	1.1	0.1	0.1	0.4	1.5
Vernon Maxwell	46	1	21.9	.390	.346	.737	1.8	1.7	0.7	0.1	10.7
Oliver Miller	4	0	8.8	.455			2.0	0.0	0.0	0.5	2.5
Kevin Ollie^{‡}	7	0	9.7	.308		.800	0.9	0.4	0.4	0.1	1.7
Scot Pollard	16	5	16.2	.541		.696	5.1	0.3	0.5	1.1	5.1
Peja Stojaković	48	1	21.4	.378	.320	.851	3.0	1.5	0.9	0.1	8.4
Chris Webber	42	42	40.9	.486	.118	.454	13.0	4.1	1.4	2.1	20.0
Jason Williams	50	50	36.1	.374	.310	.752	3.1	6.0	1.9	0.0	12.8
Corliss Williamson	50	50	27.5	.485	.200	.638	4.1	1.3	0.6	0.2	13.2

^{‡}Waived during the season

=== Playoffs ===
Player	GP	GS	MPG	FG%	3P%	FT%	RPG	APG	SPG	BPG	PPG
Tariq Abdul-Wahad	5	5	19.8	.455	.000	.813	3.8	0.8	0.8	0.8	8.6
Jon Barry	5	0	22.4	.353	.263	.917	2.0	1.8	1.2	0.2	8.0
Vlade Divac	5	5	39.6	.446	.200	.833	10.0	4.6	1.6	0.8	16.2
Lawrence Funderburke	3	0	10.3	.417			1.3	0.3	1.0	0.0	3.3
Michael Hawkins	2	0	5.0	.000	.000	1.000	0.0	0.0	0.0	0.0	1.0
Jerome James	1	0	4.0	.500		.750	2.0	0.0	0.0	0.0	5.0
Vernon Maxwell	5	0	12.0	.317	.314	.700	2.2	1.0	1.2	0.0	11.2
Scot Pollard	5	0	14.8	.667		.600	2.2	0.2	0.8	1.2	3.0
Peja Stojaković	5	0	21.6	.346	.214	1.000	3.8	0.4	0.6	0.0	4.8
Chris Webber	5	5	38.4	.388	.286	.400	9.4	4.0	1.8	1.0	14.8
Jason Williams	5	5	32.6	.356	.310	1.000	3.6	4.0	1.6	0.2	10.0
Corliss Williamson	5	5	26.0	.575		.700	3.2	1.2	0.4	0.2	10.6

Player statistics citation:

== Awards and records ==
- Geoff Petrie, NBA Executive of the Year Award
- Chris Webber, All-NBA Second Team
- Jason Williams, NBA All-Rookie Team 1st Team

== Transactions ==
=== Free agents ===
==== Re-signed ====
Player	Signed	Contract
Corliss Williamson	January 22, 1999	One-year, $500,000

==== Additions ====
Player	Signed	Former team
Peter Aluma	January 21, 1999	Liberty
Jon Barry	January 22, 1999	Los Angeles Lakers
Vlade Divac	January 22, 1999	Charlotte Hornets
Vernon Maxwell	January 22, 1999	Charlotte Hornets
Kevin Ollie	January 22, 1999	Orlando Magic
Oliver Miller	February 1, 1999	Toronto Raptors
Michael Hawkins	February 22, 1999	Portland Trail Blazers
Scot Pollard	February 24, 1999	Atlanta Hawks

==== Subtractions ====
Player	Reason left	Date	New team
Anthony Johnson	Free agent	January 21, 1999	Atlanta Hawks
Billy Owens	Free agent	January 21, 1999	Seattle SuperSonics
Olden Polynice	Free agent	January 21, 1999	Seattle SuperSonics
Michael Stewart	Free agent	January 21, 1999	Toronto Raptors
Peter Aluma	Waived	February 19, 1999	—
Kevin Ollie	Waived	February 19, 1999	Orlando Magic
Terry Dehere	Waived	February 23, 1999	Vancouver Grizzlies
Mark Hendrickson	Free agent	March 25, 1999	New Jersey Nets
Mahmoud Abdul-Rauf	Retired	June 22, 1999	—

Player Transactions Citation:

== See also ==
- 1998–99 NBA season
