= Isaiah Rider =

American basketball player (born 1971)

Personal information
- Born: March 12, 1971 (age 55) Oakland, California, U.S.
- Listed height: 6 ft 5 in (1.96 m)
- Listed weight: 215 lb (98 kg)

Career information
- High school: Encinal (Alameda, California)
- College: Allen CC (1989–1990); Antelope Valley (1990–1991); UNLV (1991–1993)
- NBA draft: 1993: 1st round, 5th overall pick
- Drafted by: Minnesota Timberwolves
- Playing career: 1993–2001
- Position: Shooting guard
- Number: 34, 7

Career history
- 1993–1996: Minnesota Timberwolves
- 1996–1999: Portland Trail Blazers
- 1999–2000: Atlanta Hawks
- 2000–2001: Los Angeles Lakers
- 2001: Denver Nuggets

Career highlights
- NBA champion (2001); NBA All-Rookie First Team (1994); NBA Slam Dunk Contest champion (1994); Consensus second-team All-American (1993); Big West Player of the Year (1993); 2× First-team All-Big West (1992, 1993)

Career NBA statistics
- Points: 9,405 (16.7 ppg)
- Rebounds: 2,166 (3.8 rpg)
- Assists: 1,535 (2.7 apg)
- Stats at NBA.com
- Stats at Basketball Reference

Isaiah Rider Jr., nicknamed J.R. (born March 12, 1971), is an American former professional basketball player who played nine seasons in the National Basketball Association (NBA).

Rider was born in Oakland, California, and was raised in nearby Alameda. He starred in both baseball and basketball at Encinal High School before going on to a college career with the University of Nevada, Las Vegas (UNLV), and a professional career in the NBA.

== Early life and college career ==
The 6-foot-5-inch (1.96 m) Rider was a prep star at Encinal High School in Alameda, California (just outside Oakland) and was one of the top rated players in the state. Rider attended two junior colleges, Allen County Community College in Iola, Kansas, where he averaged just over 30 points per game; and Antelope Valley College in Lancaster, California (33 points per game), before finding a home at UNLV.

During the 1991–1992 season, Rider led the Runnin' Rebels to a 26–2 record (18–0 in conference) and a number 7 ranking in the final Associated Press regular season poll while averaging over 21 points per game, but wasn't seen on national television because UNLV was serving an NCAA-imposed punishment that stemmed from previous infractions. (In a "plea bargain" of sorts, UNLV was allowed to defend its NCAA title the previous year – they lost to Duke in the Final Four. In exchange, the Rebels were barred from postseason play and national television for the 1991–92 season.) He finally got the nation's eyes to watch him in his senior year, where he averaged 29.1 points per game (2nd in the country behind University of Texas-Pan American's Greg Guy), was named the Big West Conference Player of the Year and garnered 2nd-Team All-American honors. UNLV finished 21-8 (13–5 in Big West Conference), lost the regular season conference title to New Mexico State and failed to make the NCAA's 64-team Tournament field. The Rebels did earn a spot in the National Invitation Tournament, but Rider was suspended for the NIT due to academic issues surrounding allegations that he had someone cheating for him on some of his college classwork. Without their star player on the court, the Runnin' Rebels were knocked out of the NIT in the 1st round 90–73 to Southern California.

== Professional career ==
=== Minnesota Timberwolves (1993–1996) ===
Rider was chosen with the 5th overall pick of the 1993 NBA draft by the Minnesota Timberwolves. Rider started his NBA career strong, finishing the 1993–94 season as a member of the NBA's All-Rookie First Team. He won the 1994 NBA Slam Dunk Contest (he brashly predicted that he would win on draft day) with a dunk that he called "The East Bay Funk Dunk."

Rider also became famous for a miraculous shot made in a game on December 22, 1994, against the Sacramento Kings. Losing control of the ball with it nearly going out of bounds, Rider reached out and threw the ball blindly over his shoulder to keep it in play, and the ball went through the hoop as a three-point basket, a play that one announcer exclaimed as the "Play of the decade."

While Rider averaged 19 points per game in his three years with the Timberwolves, his play slipped after his rookie season. He also began a pattern of off-court misbehavior. He was found to be insubordinate towards Timberwolves management, and was involved in an incident in which he kicked the female manager of a sports bar for which he ultimately was convicted of fifth-degree assault. By 1996, Minnesota finally lost patience with Rider and dealt him to Portland in return for Bill Curley, James Robinson and a conditional first round draft pick in 1997 or 1998. Just before the trade Rider was arrested for marijuana possession. At the time of his arrest he also had an illegal cell phone; it had been altered to charge calls to someone else's bill. He was later convicted of misdemeanor marijuana possession, and pleaded no contest to possessing the illegal cell phone. Three weeks later, he was arrested for gambling in public back in Oakland.

=== Portland Trail Blazers (1996–1999) ===
In the 1997–98 season, Rider led the Blazers in scoring (19.7 points per game, 15th in the NBA) and in three-pointers made (135, 8th) and attempted (420). Rider tallied a season-high 38 points (15-25 FG), along with 5 rebounds and 4 assists, against the Toronto Raptors on February 1, 1998.

In the 1998–99 season, Rider averaged 13.9 points per game and led the team in scoring 13 times.

=== Atlanta Hawks (1999–2000) ===
Following the 1998–99 season, Rider was traded to the Atlanta Hawks in a trade that sent Steve Smith to the Blazers. The Hawks had finished fourth in the Eastern Conference in the lockout-shortened season, and thought Rider was the final piece in the puzzle. So they sent Smith to the Blazers for Rider and Jim Jackson, another talent who had not quite reached his potential. The trade didn't sit well with Hawks fans, since Smith had been one of the most popular players on the team. Coach Lenny Wilkens didn't want the trade either, but tried to fit Rider into the system.

Rider played well enough on the court, pacing the Hawks in scoring. However, his off-court incidents exploded in Atlanta. After reports that he had smoked marijuana in an Orlando hotel room, the league demanded that he attend drug counseling. He refused and was fined a total of $200,000 until he agreed to attend. He was suspended numerous times by the Hawks as well, and fined a total of $200,000 by the team. Even after Wilkens benched him in March with the Hawks long out of contention, Rider still continued to be tardy for games and practices, prompting the Hawks to threaten a three-game suspension for another incident. He showed up late for a March game in Detroit, and rather than serve a three-game suspension, he demanded his outright release. The Hawks complied.

=== Los Angeles Lakers (2000–2001) ===
Rider played in 67 games with the Lakers during the 2000–01 season, leading their bench in scoring with a 7.6 average. He was suspended for five games in March 2001 for failing to comply with the NBA's anti-drug policy. Though left off the playoff roster in favor of Tyronn Lue, Rider was awarded a championship ring by the franchise. After the season, Rider stated that he wanted to return to the Lakers.

=== Denver Nuggets (2001) ===
Prior to the 2001–02 season, the Denver Nuggets signed Rider to help resuscitate their moribund offense, but Rider's stint in Denver was limited to just 10 games before he was waived on November 20, 2001. Rider refused to term it "retirement" at the time, however, insisting that he could still play if given the chance.

In 563 NBA games, (424 starts), Rider averaged 16.7 points, 3.8 rebounds, 2.7 assists, and 31:42 of floor time per game. Rider totaled 9,405 points in his 9-year NBA career.

== Career statistics ==
Legend
GP	Games played	GS	Games started	MPG	Minutes per game
FG%	Field goal percentage	3P%	3-point field goal percentage	FT%	Free throw percentage
RPG	Rebounds per game	APG	Assists per game	SPG	Steals per game
BPG	Blocks per game	PPG	Points per game	**Bold**	Career high
†	Won an NBA championship

=== NBA ===
==== Regular season ====
Year	Team	GP	GS	MPG	FG%	3P%	FT%	RPG	APG	SPG	BPG	PPG
1993–94	Minnesota	**79**	60	30.6	**.468**	.360	.811	4.0	2.6	.7	**.4**	16.6
1994–95	Minnesota	75	67	35.3	.447	.351	.817	3.3	3.3	**.9**	.3	**20.4**
1995–96	Minnesota	75	**68**	34.6	.464	.371	.838	4.1	2.8	.6	.3	19.6
1996–97	Portland	76	**68**	33.7	.464	.385	.812	4.0	2.6	.6	.3	16.1
1997–98	Portland	74	66	**37.6**	.423	.321	.828	**4.7**	3.1	.7	.3	19.7
1998–99	Portland	47	41	29.5	.412	.378	.755	4.2	2.2	.5	.2	13.9
1999–2000	Atlanta	60	47	34.7	.419	.311	.785	4.3	**3.7**	.7	.1	19.3
2000–01†	L.A. Lakers	67	6	18.0	.426	.370	**.855**	2.3	1.7	.4	.1	7.6
2001–02	Denver	10	1	17.3	.457	**.400**	.765	3.3	1.2	.3	.2	9.3
Career		563	424	31.7	.443	.352	.812	3.8	2.7	.7	.2	16.7

==== Playoffs ====
Year	Team	GP	GS	MPG	FG%	3P%	FT%	RPG	APG	SPG	BPG	PPG
1997	Portland	4	4	40.3	.372	.375	.882	2.0	4.3	.8	.0	13.3
1998	Portland	4	4	**41.5**	.418	.091	.769	**5.0**	**4.3**	**1.3**	.0	**19.3**
1999	Portland	**13**	**13**	32.8	**.429**	**.423**	**.887**	3.8	2.4	.8	.0	16.5
Career		21	21	35.9	.418	.340	.860	3.7	3.1	.9	.0	16.4

== Off the court ==
During his NBA career and in subsequent years, Rider was dogged by a variety of personal problems, including accusations of drug use and assault. In 2007, he was sentenced to seven months in jail after pleading guilty to cocaine possession, evading the police, and battery, though he only served about half of that time. "It was the ultimate low point of my life [...] There were no visitors. No one down for me. No letters. I had fake friends. They left me for dead", Rider told Yahoo! Sports. At the time of his sentencing, Rider's mother was in a coma, which weighed heavily on his mind.

In 2012, Rider announced he was planning to release a documentary about his life, called My Testimony: Raw and Uncut. Rider has also established a charitable organization for children called the Sky Rider Foundation. "I just want to help kids. With today's economy some parents cannot afford to send their kids to the extracurricular activities. It's very costly, there's registration fees, equipment, uniforms and shoe costs. If a kid has dreams to be somebody, I want to help", he said in an interview.

On December 4, 2025, Rider was arrested by Gilbert, Arizona police on suspicion of violating a protective order. He was charged with one count of interfering with judicial proceedings.

=== Rap career ===
On a 1994 album titled B-Ball's Best Kept Secret which featured songs performed by NBA players ranging from Gary Payton and Jason Kidd to Brian Shaw and Chris Mills, Rider (credited as J.R. on the album) provided the track "Funk in the Trunk".
