= 1998–99 NBA season =

53rd NBA season

- League: National Basketball Association
- Sport: Basketball
- Duration: February 5 – May 5, 1999; May 8 – June 11, 1999 (Playoffs); June 16 – 25, 1999 (Finals)
- Games: 50
- Teams: 29
- TV partner(s): NBC, TBS, TNT

Draft
- Top draft pick: Michael Olowokandi
- Picked by: Los Angeles Clippers

Regular season
- Top seed: San Antonio Spurs
- Season MVP: Karl Malone (Utah)
- Top scorer: Allen Iverson (Philadelphia)

Playoffs
- Eastern champions: New York Knicks
- Eastern runners-up: Indiana Pacers
- Western champions: San Antonio Spurs
- Western runners-up: Portland Trail Blazers

Finals
- Champions: San Antonio Spurs
- Runners-up: New York Knicks
- Finals MVP: Tim Duncan (San Antonio)

NBA seasons
- ← 1997–98 1999–2000 →

The 1998–99 NBA season was the 53rd season of the National Basketball Association (NBA). Due to the lockout, the regular season was reduced to 50 games for each team, and began on February 5, 1999. The 1999 NBA All-Star Game, which was to be held at First Union Center in Philadelphia, was also cancelled as a result of the lockout. The playoffs then began on May 8, and ended on June 25 with the San Antonio Spurs defeating the New York Knicks in the 1999 NBA Finals.

== Lockout ==
The third lockout in the history of the NBA lasted from July 1, 1998, to January 20, 1999. NBA owners were seeking changes to the league's salary cap system and a ceiling on individual player salaries. The National Basketball Players Association opposed the owners' plans and wanted raises for players who earned the league's minimum salary.

As the labor dispute continued into September, the preseason was shortened to just two games instead of the normal eight, and training camps were postponed indefinitely. By October, it became the first time in NBA history that games were canceled due to a labor dispute. Further games were canceled by November and December, including the league's Christmas games (which had been played on an annual basis since 1947) and All-Star Game, which had been scheduled to be played on February 14, 1999. The preseason consisted of 2 exhibition games.

An agreement between the owners and players was eventually reached on January 18, 1999. When play resumed, the regular season was shortened to 50 games per team, as opposed to the normal 82. To preserve games between teams in the same conference, much of the time missed was made up for by skipping well over half of the games played between teams from the opposite conferences. As a result, some teams did not meet each other at all during the course of the shortened season.

== Notable occurrences ==
Coaching changes
Offseason
Team	1997–98 coach	1998–99 coach
Chicago Bulls	Phil Jackson	Tim Floyd
Denver Nuggets	Bill Hanzlik	Mike D'Antoni
Los Angeles Clippers	Bill Fitch	Chris Ford
Milwaukee Bucks	Chris Ford	George Karl
Sacramento Kings	Eddie Jordan	Rick Adelman
Seattle SuperSonics	George Karl	Paul Westphal
In-season
Team	Outgoing coach	Incoming coach
Charlotte Hornets	Dave Cowens	Paul Silas
Los Angeles Lakers	Del Harris	Bill Bertka
Los Angeles Lakers	Bill Bertka	Kurt Rambis
New Jersey Nets	John Calipari	Don Casey
Washington Wizards	Bernie Bickerstaff	Jim Brovelli

- Michael Jordan announced his retirement for the second time on January 13, 1999, while the lockout was still ongoing. He would later return to play two more seasons for the Washington Wizards from 2001 to 2003.
- The New York Knicks became only the second #8 seed to advance in the playoffs by defeating a #1 seed.
- The Los Angeles Lakers played their final season at the Great Western Forum. Because the Great Western Bank ceased to exist two seasons prior, the arena name was replaced by the team name on center court, in anticipation of the move to the Staples Center.
- The Los Angeles Clippers played their final season at the Los Angeles Sports Arena; they too would move to the Staples Center the following season.
- The Indiana Pacers played their final season at the Market Square Arena.
- The Denver Nuggets played their final season at the McNichols Sports Arena.
- The Miami Heat played their final season at the Miami Arena, although they still played the first two months of the following season at this arena before moving to the American Airlines Arena in January 2000.
- The Toronto Raptors played their first game in Air Canada Centre on February 21.
- The San Antonio Spurs became the first former ABA team to win a championship. (They are one of two surviving ABA teams to win an NBA Title, as the Nuggets won a title in 2023. The Nets and Pacers have not yet won the NBA championship despite both appearing in two NBA Finals.)
- The Atlanta Hawks played another season in the Georgia Dome while Philips Arena was constructed for the 1999–2000 season. This season would be the Hawks' last playoff appearance until the 2007–08 season.
- The Clippers tied the 1988–89 Miami Heat for the longest losing streak to start the season (17) from February 5 until March 11 when they defeated the Sacramento Kings. In December 2009, this record was broken by the New Jersey Nets who lost the first eighteen games of the season.
- Detroit Pistons guard Joe Dumars retired after fourteen years in the NBA, all of which he spent playing with the Pistons.
- Hall of Fame coach Red Holzman died on November 13, 1998, at age 78.
- For the first time in 15 seasons, the Chicago Bulls missed the playoffs. They would also become the second defending champion in NBA history that failed to make the playoffs, joining the 1969–70 Boston Celtics.
- Karl Malone of the Utah Jazz wins his second MVP award in three years and became the oldest MVP award recipient in NBA history as of today.

== 1998–99 NBA changes ==
- The Indiana Pacers added new gold pinstripe alternate uniforms with dark navy blue side panels to their jerseys and shorts.
- The Minnesota Timberwolves added new black alternate uniforms.
- The New Jersey Nets added new gray alternate uniforms with dark navy blue side panels to their jerseys and shorts.
- The Orlando Magic changed their uniforms, replacing the pinstripes with slightly visible stars on their jerseys.
- The Sacramento Kings added new purple alternate uniforms with black side panels to their shorts.
- The Toronto Raptors moved into Air Canada Centre (now Scotiabank Arena) during the regular season.
- The Utah Jazz added new black alternate uniforms with brown side panels to their jerseys and shorts.

== Final standings ==
=== By division ===
Eastern Conference

Atlantic Division	W	L	PCT	GB	Home	Road	Div	GP
c-Miami Heat	33	17	.660	–	18‍–‍7	15‍–‍10	12–8	50
x-Orlando Magic	33	17	.660	–	21‍–‍4	12‍–‍13	12–6	50
x-Philadelphia 76ers	28	22	.560	5.0	17‍–‍8	11‍–‍14	9–10	50
x-New York Knicks	27	23	.540	6.0	19‍–‍6	8‍–‍17	12–8	50
Boston Celtics	19	31	.380	14.0	10‍–‍15	9‍–‍16	10–9	50
Washington Wizards	18	32	.360	15.0	13‍–‍12	5‍–‍20	6–13	50
New Jersey Nets	16	34	.320	17.0	12‍–‍13	4‍–‍21	6–13	50

Central Division	W	L	PCT	GB	Home	Road	Div	GP
y-Indiana Pacers	33	17	.660	–	18‍–‍7	15‍–‍10	15–7	50
x-Atlanta Hawks	31	19	.620	2.0	16‍–‍9	15‍–‍10	15–8	50
x-Detroit Pistons	29	21	.580	4.0	17‍–‍8	12‍–‍13	13–8	50
x-Milwaukee Bucks	28	22	.560	5.0	17‍–‍8	11‍–‍14	13–11	50
Charlotte Hornets	26	24	.520	7.0	16‍–‍9	10‍–‍15	12–10	50
Toronto Raptors	23	27	.460	10.0	14‍–‍11	9‍–‍16	9–14	50
Cleveland Cavaliers	22	28	.440	11.0	15‍–‍10	7‍–‍18	9–13	50
Chicago Bulls	13	37	.260	20.0	8‍–‍17	5‍–‍20	4–19	50

Western Conference

Midwest Division	W	L	PCT	GB	Home	Road	Div
y-San Antonio Spurs	37	13	.740	–	21–4	16–9	17–4
x-Utah Jazz	37	13	.740	–	22–3	15–10	15–3
x-Houston Rockets	31	19	.620	6	19–6	12–13	12–9
x-Minnesota Timberwolves	25	25	.500	12	18–7	7–18	11–9
Dallas Mavericks	19	31	.380	18	15–10	4–21	8–12
Denver Nuggets	14	36	.280	23	12–13	2–23	5–16
Vancouver Grizzlies	8	42	.160	29	7–18	1–24	3–18

Pacific Division	W	L	PCT	GB	Home	Road	Div
y-Portland Trail Blazers	35	15	.700	–	22–3	13–12	15–7
x-Los Angeles Lakers	31	19	.620	4	18–7	13–12	14–8
x-Sacramento Kings	27	23	.540	8	16–9	11–14	11–9
x-Phoenix Suns	27	23	.540	8	15–10	12–13	9–10
Seattle SuperSonics	25	25	.500	10	17–8	8–17	11–10
Golden State Warriors	21	29	.420	14	13–12	8–17	8–11
Los Angeles Clippers	9	41	.180	26	6–19	3–22	3–16

=== By conference ===
Eastern Conference
#	Team	W	L	PCT	GB	GP
1	c-Miami Heat *	33	17	.660	–	50
2	y-Indiana Pacers *	33	17	.660	–	50
3	x-Orlando Magic	33	17	.660	–	50
4	x-Atlanta Hawks	31	19	.620	2.0	50
5	x-Detroit Pistons	29	21	.580	4.0	50
6	x-Philadelphia 76ers	28	22	.560	5.0	50
7	x-Milwaukee Bucks	28	22	.560	5.0	50
8	x-New York Knicks	27	23	.540	6.0	50
9	Charlotte Hornets	26	24	.520	7.0	50
10	Toronto Raptors	23	27	.460	10.0	50
11	Cleveland Cavaliers	22	28	.440	11.0	50
12	Boston Celtics	19	31	.380	14.0	50
13	Washington Wizards	18	32	.360	15.0	50
14	New Jersey Nets	16	34	.320	17.0	50
15	Chicago Bulls	13	37	.260	20.0	50

#	Western Conference				
#	Team	W	L	PCT	GB
1	z-San Antonio Spurs	37	13	.740	–
2	y-Portland Trail Blazers	35	15	.700	2
3	x-Utah Jazz	37	13	.740	–
4	x-Los Angeles Lakers	31	19	.620	6
5	x-Houston Rockets	31	19	.620	6
6	x-Sacramento Kings	27	23	.540	10
7	x-Phoenix Suns	27	23	.540	10
8	x-Minnesota Timberwolves	25	25	.500	12
9	Seattle SuperSonics	25	25	.500	12
10	Golden State Warriors	21	29	.420	16
11	Dallas Mavericks	19	31	.380	18
12	Denver Nuggets	14	36	.280	23
13	Los Angeles Clippers	9	41	.180	28
14	Vancouver Grizzlies	8	42	.160	29

Notes

- z – Clinched home court advantage for the entire playoffs
- c – Clinched home court advantage for the conference playoffs
- y – Clinched division title
- x – Clinched playoff spot

== Playoffs ==
Teams in bold advanced to the next round. The numbers to the left of each team indicate the team's seeding in its conference, and the numbers to the right indicate the number of games the team won in that round. The division champions are marked by an asterisk. Home court advantage does not necessarily belong to the higher-seeded team, but instead the team with the better regular season record; teams enjoying the home advantage are shown in italics.

First Round	Conference Semifinals
E1	Miami*	2
**E8**	**New York**	**3**
**E8**	**New York**	**4**
E4	Atlanta	0
**E4**	**Atlanta**	**3**
E5	Detroit	2
**Eastern Conference**
E3	Orlando	1
**E6**	**Philadelphia**	**3**
E6	Philadelphia	0
**E2**	**Indiana***	**4**
**E2**	**Indiana***	**3**
E7	Milwaukee	0
**W1**	**San Antonio***	**3**
W8	Minnesota	1
**W1**	**San Antonio***	**4**
W4	LA Lakers	0
**W4**	**LA Lakers**	**3**
W5	Houston	1
**Western Conference**
**W3**	**Utah**	**3**
W6	Sacramento	2
W3	Utah	2
**W2**	**Portland***	**4**
**W2**	**Portland***	**3**
W7	Phoenix	0

Conference Finals
**E8**	**New York**	**4**
E2	Indiana*	2
**W1**	**San Antonio***	**4**
W2	Portland*	0

NBA Finals
E8	New York	1
**W1**	**San Antonio***	**4**

- * Division winner
- **Bold** Series winner
- Italic Team with home-court advantage

== Statistics leaders ==
Category	Player	Team	Stat
Points per game	Allen Iverson	Philadelphia 76ers	26.8
Rebounds per game	Chris Webber	Sacramento Kings	13.0
Assists per game	Jason Kidd	Phoenix Suns	10.8
Steals per game	Kendall Gill	New Jersey Nets	2.68
Blocks per game	Alonzo Mourning	Miami Heat	3.91
FG%	Shaquille O'Neal	Los Angeles Lakers	.576
FT%	Reggie Miller	Indiana Pacers	.915
3FG%	Dell Curry	Milwaukee Bucks	.476

== NBA awards ==
- Most Valuable Player: Karl Malone, Utah Jazz
- Rookie of the Year: Vince Carter, Toronto Raptors
- Defensive Player of the Year: Alonzo Mourning, Miami Heat
- Sixth Man of the Year: Darrell Armstrong, Orlando Magic
- Most Improved Player: Darrell Armstrong, Orlando Magic
- Coach of the Year: Mike Dunleavy, Portland Trail Blazers
- Executive of the Year: Geoff Petrie, Sacramento Kings
- Sportsmanship Award: Hersey Hawkins, Seattle SuperSonics

- All-NBA First Team:
  - F – Tim Duncan, San Antonio Spurs
  - F – Karl Malone, Utah Jazz
  - C – Alonzo Mourning, Miami Heat
  - G – Allen Iverson, Philadelphia 76ers
  - G – Jason Kidd, Phoenix Suns
- All-NBA Second Team:
  - F – Chris Webber, Sacramento Kings
  - F – Grant Hill, Detroit Pistons
  - C – Shaquille O'Neal, Los Angeles Lakers
  - G – Gary Payton, Seattle SuperSonics
  - G – Tim Hardaway, Miami Heat
- All-NBA Third Team:
  - F – Kevin Garnett, Minnesota Timberwolves
  - F – Antonio McDyess, Denver Nuggets
  - C – Hakeem Olajuwon, Houston Rockets
  - G – Kobe Bryant, Los Angeles Lakers
  - G – John Stockton, Utah Jazz

- NBA All-Defensive First Team:
  - F – Tim Duncan, San Antonio Spurs
  - F – Karl Malone, Utah Jazz
  - F – Scottie Pippen, Houston Rockets
  - C – Alonzo Mourning, Miami Heat
  - G – Gary Payton, Seattle SuperSonics
  - G – Jason Kidd, Phoenix Suns
- NBA All-Defensive Second Team:
  - F – P. J. Brown, Miami Heat
  - F – Theo Ratliff, Philadelphia 76ers
  - C – Dikembe Mutombo, Atlanta Hawks
  - G – Eddie Jones, Los Angeles Lakers/Charlotte Hornets
  - G – Mookie Blaylock, Atlanta Hawks

- NBA All-Rookie First Team:
  - Vince Carter, Toronto Raptors
  - Paul Pierce, Boston Celtics
  - Jason Williams, Sacramento Kings
  - Mike Bibby, Vancouver Grizzlies
  - Matt Harpring, Orlando Magic
- All-NBA Rookie Second Team:
  - Antawn Jamison, Golden State Warriors
  - Michael Doleac, Orlando Magic
  - Michael Olowokandi, Los Angeles Clippers
  - Michael Dickerson, Houston Rockets
  - Cuttino Mobley, Houston Rockets

=== Players of the month ===
The following players were named the Players of the Month.

Month	Player
February	Allen Iverson (Philadelphia 76ers)
March	Tim Duncan (San Antonio Spurs)
April	Jason Kidd (Phoenix Suns)

=== Rookies of the month ===
The following players were named the Rookies of the Month.

Month	Player
February	Paul Pierce (Boston Celtics)
March	Vince Carter (Toronto Raptors)
April	Vince Carter (Toronto Raptors)

=== Coaches of the month ===
The following coaches were named Coaches of the Month.

Month	Coach
February	Jerry Sloan (Utah Jazz)
March	Mike Dunleavy, Sr. (Portland Trail Blazers)
April	Gregg Popovich (San Antonio Spurs)

== See also ==
- List of NBA regular season records
