= Gregg Popovich =

American basketball executive and coach (born 1949)

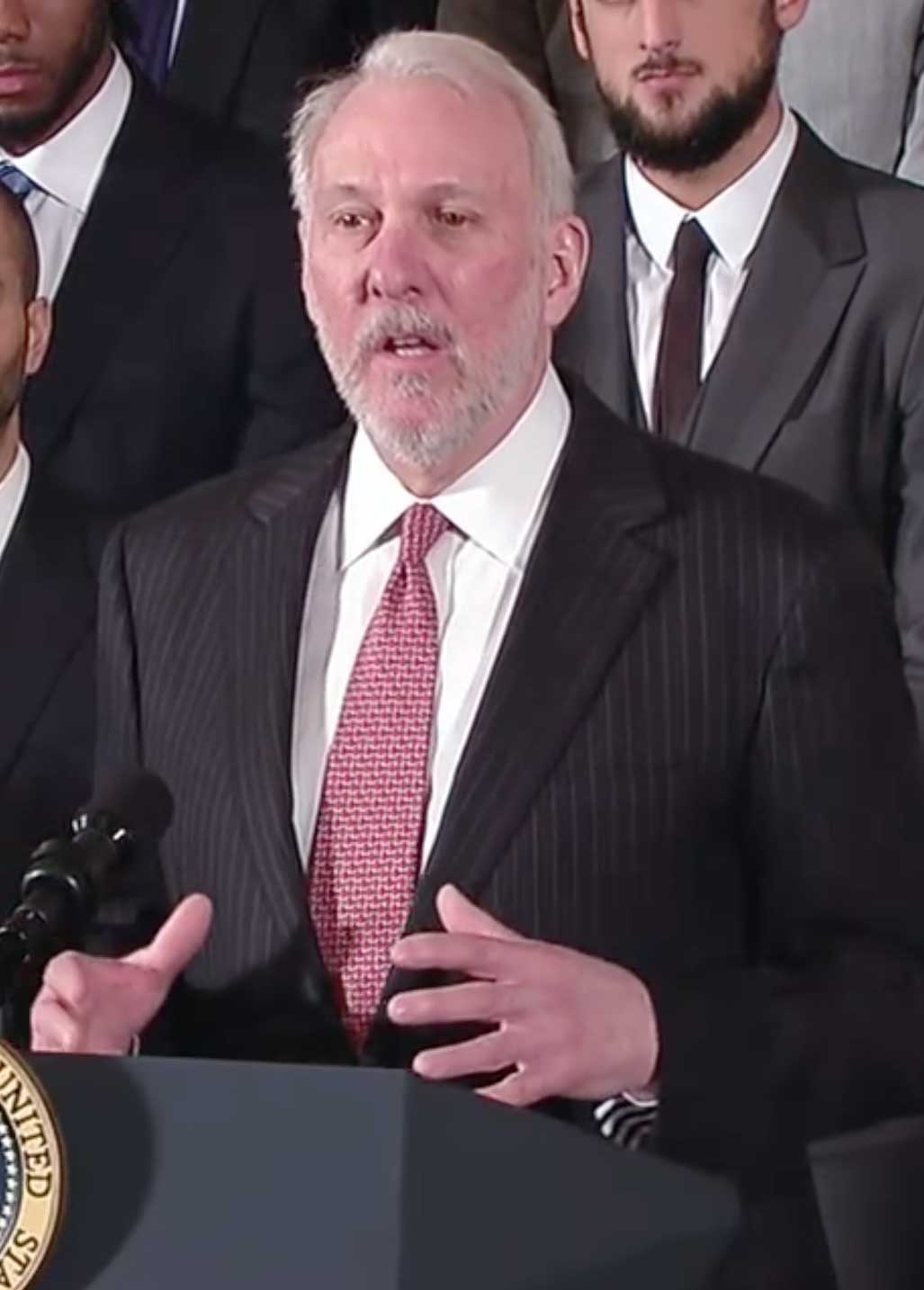
- Popovich speaking at the White House in 2015

San Antonio Spurs
- Title: President of basketball operations
- League: NBA

Personal information
- Born: January 28, 1949 (age 77) East Chicago, Indiana, U.S.
- Listed height: 6 ft 3 in (1.91 m)

Career information
- High school: Merrillville (Merrillville, Indiana)
- College: Air Force (1966–1970)
- Position: Guard
- Coaching career: 1973–2025

Career history

Coaching
- 1973–1979: Air Force (assistant)
- 1979–1986: Pomona-Pitzer
- 1986–1987: Kansas (assistant)
- 1987–1988: Pomona-Pitzer
- 1988–1992: San Antonio Spurs (assistant)
- 1992–1994: Golden State Warriors (assistant)
- 1996–2025: San Antonio Spurs

Career highlights
- As head coach: 5× NBA champion (1999, 2003, 2005, 2007, 2014); 3× NBA Coach of the Year (2003, 2012, 2014); 4× NBA All-Star Game head coach (2005, 2011, 2013, 2016); 3× SCIAC champion (1980–1982); Top 15 Coaches in NBA History; No. 1390 honored by San Antonio Spurs

Career coaching record
- NBA: 1,390–824 (.628)
- Record at Basketball Reference
- Basketball Hall of Fame
Medals
Men's basketball
Representing the United States
Summer Olympics
Head coach for the United States
Gold medal – first place	2020 Tokyo	Team
Assistant coach for the United States
Bronze medal – third place	2004 Athens	Men's basketball
FIBA Americas Championship
Assistant coach for the United States
Gold medal – first place	2003 San Juan	Men's basketball

Gregg Charles Popovich (born January 28, 1949) is an American professional basketball executive and former coach who is the president for the San Antonio Spurs of the National Basketball Association (NBA). He was the head coach of the Spurs for 29 seasons from 1996 to 2025, during which he won five NBA championships, and was the longest-tenured active coach in the NBA as well as all other major sports leagues in the United States. He has been a member of the Spurs organization since 1994, originally as president of basketball operations and general manager, before taking over as coach in 1996. Nicknamed "Coach Pop", Popovich has the most wins of any coach in NBA history, and is widely regarded as one of the greatest coaches of all time.

Popovich led the Spurs to a winning record in each of his first 22 full seasons as head coach, surpassing Phil Jackson for the most consecutive winning seasons in NBA history. During his tenure, the Spurs had a winning record against every other NBA team. Popovich has been a key figure in the sustained success of the Spurs in the 1990s, the 2000s, and most of the 2010s. Popovich has led the Spurs to all five of their NBA titles, and is one of only five coaches in NBA history to have won five titles. He was also the head coach of the U.S. national team at the 2020 Summer Olympics, leading the team to a gold medal. In 2023, Popovich was inducted into the Naismith Memorial Basketball Hall of Fame.

After 29 seasons as head coach of the Spurs, Popovich stepped down in 2025 and transitioned into a front office role as the team's president of basketball operations.

== Early life ==
Popovich was born on January 28, 1949, in East Chicago, Indiana, to a Serbian father and Croatian mother. He graduated from Merrillville High School in 1966.

== College career ==
Popovich attended the United States Air Force Academy. He played on the academy's Air Force Falcons men's basketball team, and in his senior year was the team's captain and leading scorer. He graduated from the Academy in 1970 with a bachelor's degree in Soviet studies. Popovich underwent Air Force intelligence training and briefly considered a career with the Central Intelligence Agency.

Popovich served five years of required active duty in the United States Air Force, during which he toured Eastern Europe and the Soviet Union with the U.S. Armed Forces Basketball Team. In 1972, he was selected as captain of the Armed Forces Team, which won the Amateur Athletic Union (AAU) championship. This earned the 6-foot-2-inch (1.88 m) guard an invitation to the 1972 U.S. Olympic team trials.

== Coaching and executive career ==
=== Pomona-Pitzer and early career (1973–1994) ===
In 1973, Popovich returned to the Air Force Academy as an assistant coach under the school's head basketball coach Hank Egan. Egan later became an assistant coach under Popovich for the San Antonio Spurs. During his time as an assistant coach at the Academy, Popovich earned a master's degree in physical education and sports sciences from the University of Denver.

In 1979, Popovich was named the head coach of the Pomona-Pitzer Sagehens, the joint men's basketball team of Pomona College and Pitzer College in Claremont, California. Popovich coached the Pomona-Pitzer men's basketball team from 1979 to 1988, leading the team to its first outright title in 68 years.

During his time as head coach at Pomona-Pitzer, Popovich became a disciple and later a close friend of head coach Larry Brown at the University of Kansas. Popovich took off the 1985–86 season at Pomona-Pitzer to become a volunteer assistant at Kansas, where he could study directly under Brown. Popovich returned to Pomona-Pitzer and resumed his duties as head coach the next season.

Following the 1987–88 season, Popovich joined Brown as the lead assistant coach for the Spurs. From 1988 to 1992, Popovich was Brown's top assistant, until the entire staff, including R. C. Buford, Alvin Gentry and Ed Manning, were fired by owner Red McCombs. Popovich moved to the Golden State Warriors for a brief stint in 1992, serving as an assistant under future Hall of Famer Don Nelson and bringing with him Avery Johnson, who had been cut by the Spurs.

=== San Antonio Spurs (1994–2025) ===
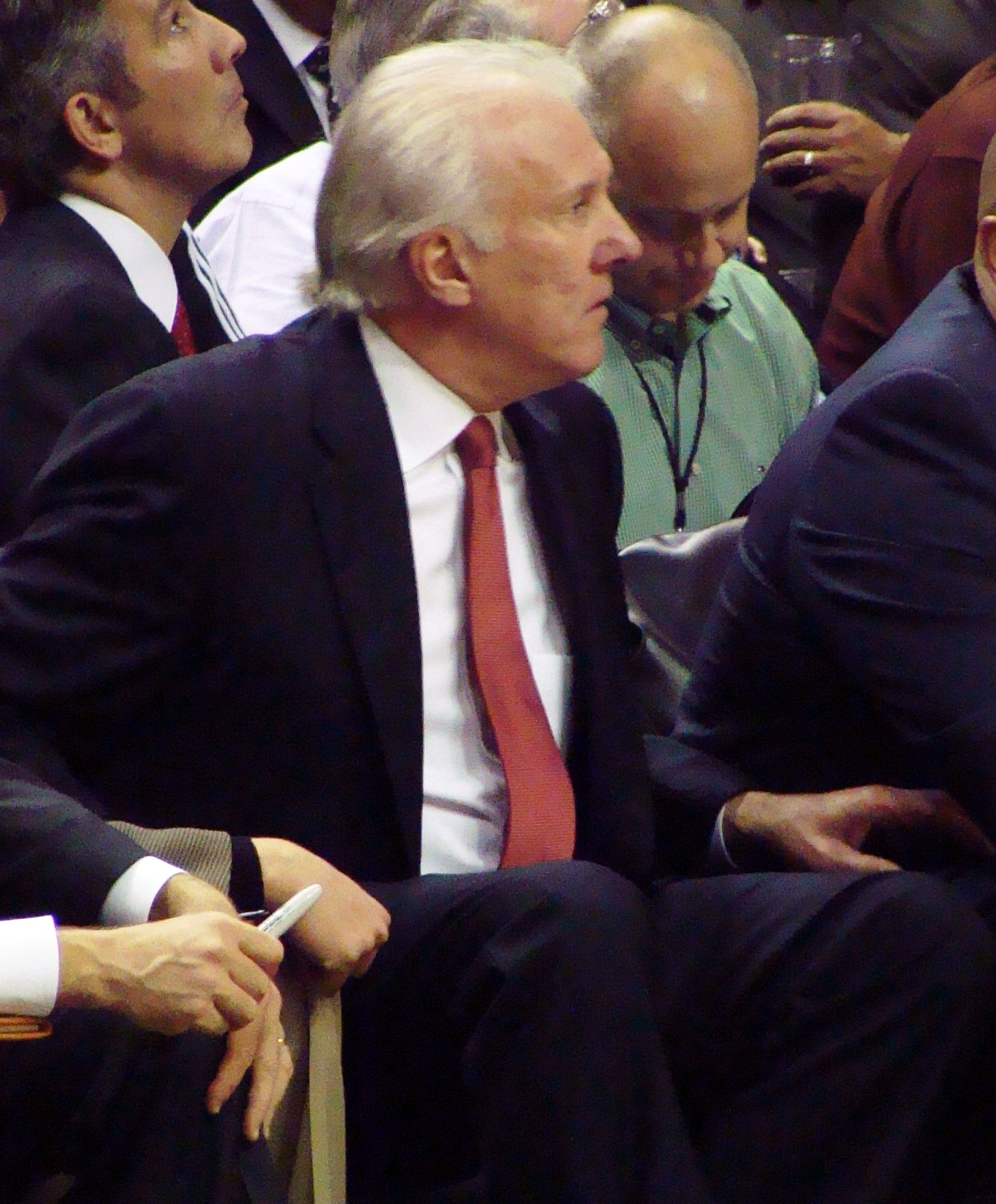
Popovich in 2010

In 1994, Popovich returned to San Antonio as the general manager and vice president of basketball operations after Peter Holt purchased the team. Popovich's first move was to sign Avery Johnson as the team's starting point guard. Another one of Popovich's early moves in San Antonio was to trade Dennis Rodman to the Chicago Bulls for Will Perdue.

After the Spurs had a 3–15 start in the 1996–97 season, with David Robinson sidelined with a preseason back injury, Popovich fired coach Bob Hill on December 10, 1996, and named himself head coach. Robinson then broke his foot after only six games and was lost for the season. Sean Elliott was also limited to 39 games due to injury, and Chuck Person missed the entire season. With a reduced roster that included an aging Dominique Wilkins, the Spurs struggled and won only 17 games for the remainder of the season for an overall record of 20–62. The Spurs' disastrous season allowed them the first overall pick in the 1997 NBA draft, which they used to draft Tim Duncan out of Wake Forest University.

The Spurs blossomed as the 6'11" Duncan teamed up with the 7'1" Robinson in a "Twin Tower" offense and defense for several years. After recovering to win 56 games in 1997–1998 (Popovich's first full year as coach), the Spurs won their first NBA title in 1999.

In 2002, Popovich relinquished his position as general manager to R. C. Buford, who had served as the team's head scout. Popovich and Buford were both given their starts in the NBA in 1988 as assistants on Brown's coaching staff with the Spurs.

Popovich has won five championships with the Spurs—1999, 2003, 2005, 2007 and 2014. He was named NBA Coach of the Year in 2003, 2012, and 2014.

On April 4, 2008, Popovich returned to the U.S. Air Force Academy to receive the academy's award of Distinguished Graduate. Despite his four NBA titles at the time, Popovich said it was the most meaningful award he had ever received.

On May 2, 2012, Popovich won his second Coach of the Year Award for the 2011–12 NBA season.

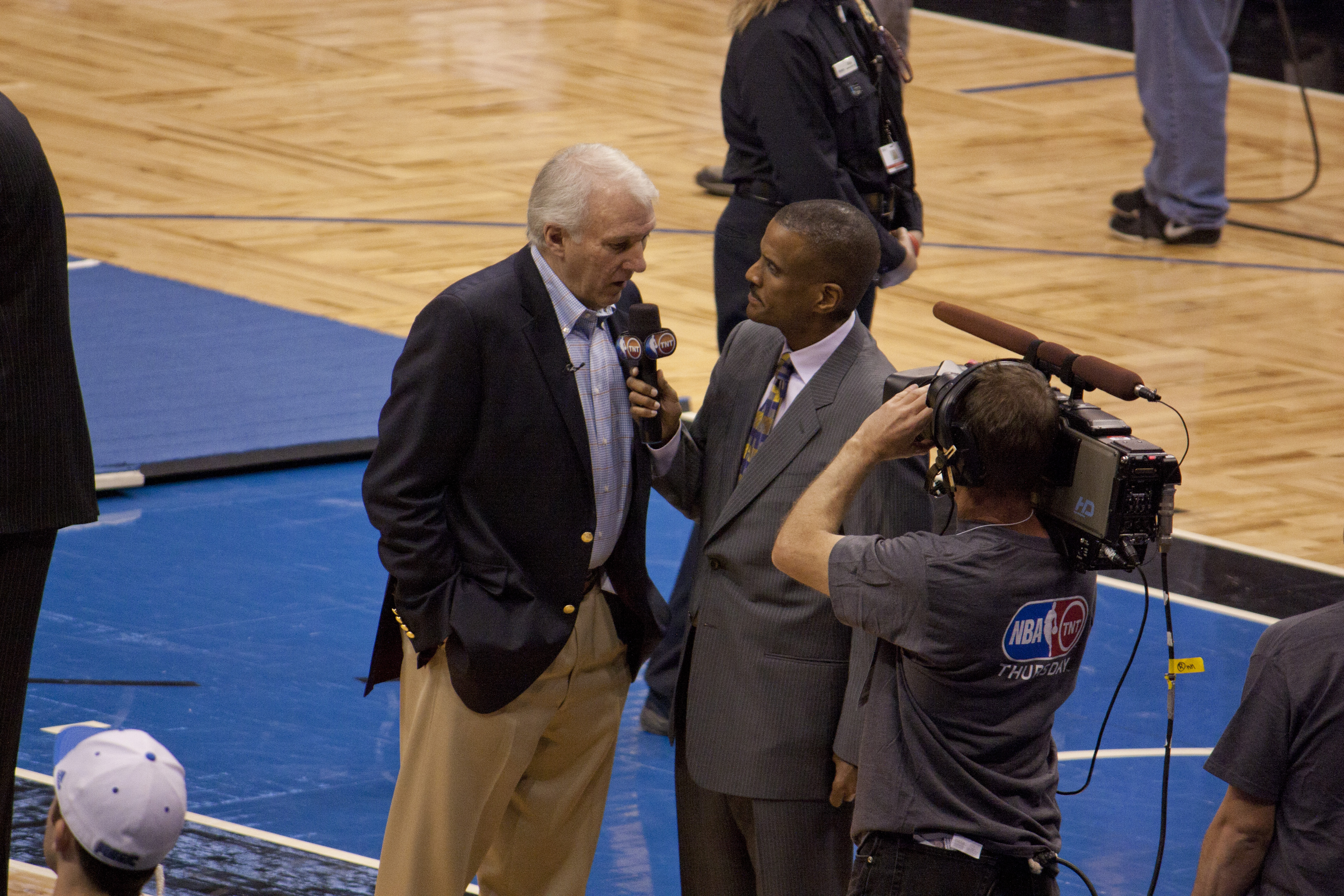
Popovich interview by David Aldridge

On November 29, 2012, Popovich sat out starters Tim Duncan, Tony Parker, Manu Ginóbili, and Danny Green for a nationally televised game against the Miami Heat. Popovich frequently sat out his starters on road trips over the years to ensure they have enough rest for the playoffs; the Spurs' roster was among the oldest in the league. NBA commissioner David Stern was outraged by this and said on the night of the game that it was "unacceptable", and "substantial sanctions [would] be forthcoming". On November 30, Stern fined the Spurs $250,000 for what he called "a disservice to the league and the fans". According to Stern, Popovich had not informed the Heat, the league or the media in a suitable time frame that the four players were not making the trip to Miami. Stern's decision was criticized by commentator Adrian Wojnarowski of Yahoo! Sports.

Popovich led the Spurs to the 2013 NBA Finals to face the Miami Heat. The series lasted seven games and resulted in the first-ever Finals loss for the Spurs.

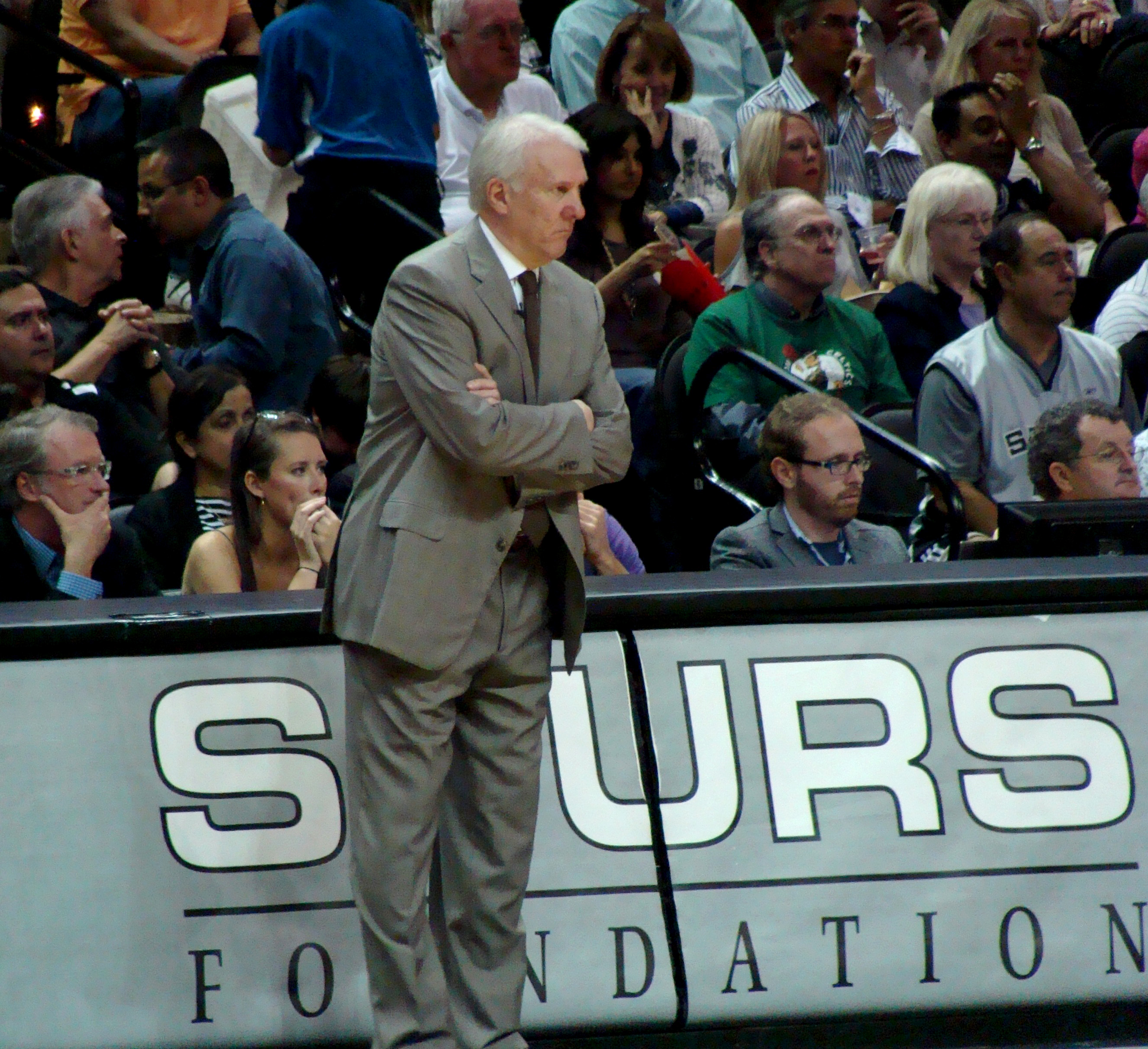
Popovich during a regular-season game in 2011

On April 22, 2014, Popovich was awarded the Red Auerbach Trophy as he won the NBA Coach of the Year for the third time. He also won his fifth NBA championship with San Antonio that season, beating the Heat 4–1 in the Finals.

On February 9, 2015, Popovich became the ninth coach in NBA history to win 1,000 games when the Spurs defeated the Indiana Pacers 95–93. He and Jerry Sloan are the only two coaches in NBA history to win 1,000 games with one franchise.

On August 1, 2015, Popovich served as Team Africa's head coach at the 2015 NBA Africa exhibition game.

In the 2015–16 season, Popovich led the Spurs to a franchise-high 67 wins, but he and the team lost in the conference semifinals against the Oklahoma City Thunder in six games.

On February 4, 2017, Popovich recorded his 1,128th regular-season win with one franchise, surpassing Sloan.

On April 13, 2019, Popovich surpassed Lenny Wilkens and became the all-time winningest coach in NBA history with his 1,413th win (regular season and playoffs combined).

On January 26, 2020, the Spurs hosted the Toronto Raptors just hours after a California helicopter crash claimed the lives of nine people, including NBA legend Kobe Bryant and his 13–year-old daughter Gianna, and Popovich proposed that both teams take an intentional 24-second shot clock violation on each of their first possessions to pay homage to Bryant's jersey number 24, which he donned from 2006 to 2016. This violation tribute would subsequently be repeated at the beginning of nearly every game around the league over the rest of that day and the following days.

On March 27, 2021, after leading his team to a 120–104 victory against the Chicago Bulls, Popovich won his 1,300th regular-season game and became the third NBA coach to reach the milestone.

On March 11, 2022, Popovich surpassed Don Nelson for most regular-season wins of all time, notching his 1,336th regular-season victory with the Spurs. Popovich needed 370 fewer games than Nelson to achieve this record.

On July 8, 2023, Popovich signed a five-year contract extension, keeping him with the franchise through the 2027–28 season.

On November 2, 2024, Popovich suffered a stroke. Two days later, it was announced that he would take an indefinite leave of absence from the team, with assistant Mitch Johnson stepping in as interim head coach. In a meeting with Spurs players on February 27, 2025, Popovich confirmed that he would not coach the team for the remainder of the season. The Spurs would post a 34–48 record, but with Popovich only coaching five games that season, the NBA later announced that they would adjust Popovich's career total by crediting the 32–45 record of the remaining 77 games to Johnson.

On May 2, 2025, the Spurs announced that Popovich would step down as coach of the Spurs after 29 seasons and would transition to a new role as president of basketball operations. Johnson was promoted to succeed Popovich as the Spurs' head coach.

== National team career ==
Popovich served on the coaching staff for the U.S. men's national team during the 2002 FIBA World Championship (assisting George Karl), during the 2003 FIBA Americas Championship, and during the 2004 Summer Olympics (assisting Larry Brown), where the U.S. team won the bronze medal.

On October 23, 2015, Popovich was named the head coach of the U.S. men's national team, taking over from Mike Krzyzewski after the 2016 Summer Olympics.

At the 2019 FIBA Basketball World Cup, the U.S. national team finished in seventh place, its worst finish ever in international competition.

With Popovich serving as the head coach for the U.S. men's national team, he led the team to a gold medal at the 2020 Summer Olympics, going 5–1 and defeating France 87–82 in the final.

== Personal life ==
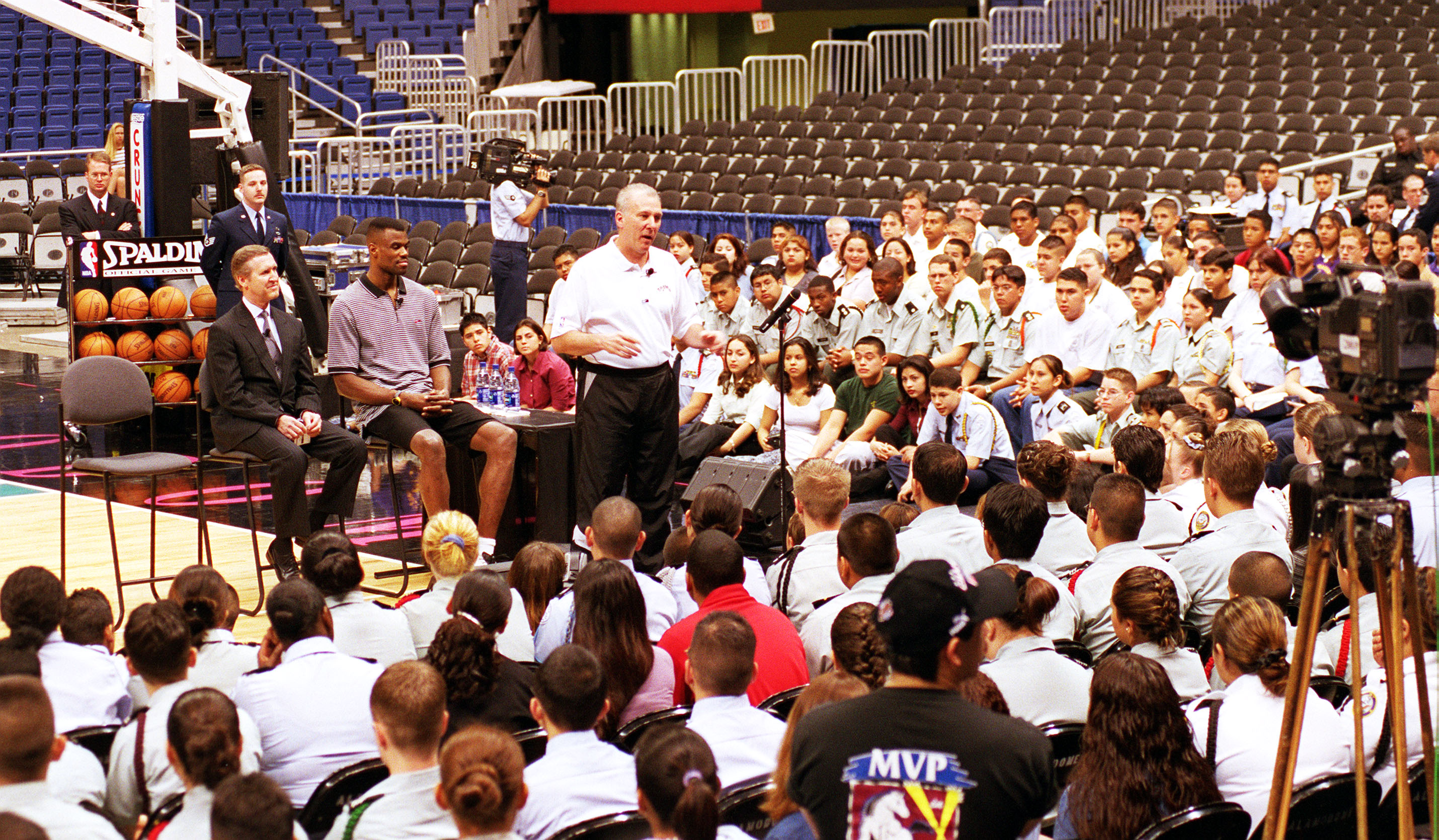
Popovich, with Secretary of Defense William Cohen and Spurs player David Robinson, speaks to Junior ROTC cadets from local high schools (2000).

Popovich was married to Erin Popovich for 42 years until her death on April 18, 2018; the couple has two children.

Popovich is a serious wine collector and an investor in Oregon's A to Z Wineworks.

In 2014, Popovich had hip replacement surgery and two heart procedures.

On November 2, 2024, Popovich had a stroke. He later took an indefinite leave from the Spurs to recover.

On April 15, 2025, Popovich reportedly fainted at a restaurant before being taken to a hospital by ambulance. Within days, he had returned home.

In September, 2026 Popovich married Mike Budenholzer's ex-wife Mary.

In 2020, a paper published in the Proceedings of the National Academy of Sciences identified the gene responsible for nectar spur growth in Aquilegia (columbines). The researchers behind the paper agreed to name the gene POPOVICH because one of them, Evangeline Ballerini, wanted "to name it after Gregg Popovich, in part, because the gene plays a regulatory role in spur development, kind of like a coach controls the development of their team".

=== Political views and activism ===
On multiple occasions, Popovich has spoken out on behalf of social justice issues. He expressed support for the 2017 Women's March. He also repeatedly criticized the behavior of U.S. President Donald Trump during his first term in office. Popovich endorsed Joe Biden in the 2020 presidential election.

=== Humanitarian work ===
Popovich has spent considerable time and money working with several charities and nonprofits such as the San Antonio Food Bank and the Innocence Project. He also took part in Shoes That Fit, an organization that aims to deliver shoes to more than 200 students at Gates Elementary School affected by Hurricanes Irma and Maria. Popovich is helping raise funds for J/P HRO, a disaster relief program that operates in Haiti, and various disaster relief organizations in the U.S. and Caribbean.

== Career playing statistics ==
Legend
GP	Games played	GS	Games started	MPG	Minutes per game
FG%	Field goal percentage	3P%	3-point field goal percentage	FT%	Free throw percentage
RPG	Rebounds per game	APG	Assists per game	SPG	Steals per game
BPG	Blocks per game	PPG	Points per game	**Bold**	Career high

=== College ===
Year	Team	GP	FG%	FT%	RPG	PPG
1968–69	Air Force	19	.481	.650	1.9	5.4
1969–70	Air Force	**24**	**.559**	**.796**	**4.5**	**14.3**
Career		43	.540	.754	3.4	10.3

== Head coaching record ==
=== College ===
Record table
Season	Team	Overall	Conference	Standing	Postseason
**Pomona-Pitzer Sagehens** (Southern California Intercollegiate Athletic Conference) (1979–1986)
1979–80	Pomona-Pitzer	2–22	1–11	6th	
1980–81	Pomona-Pitzer	10–15	3–9	6th	
1981–82	Pomona-Pitzer	9–17	6–6		
1982–83	Pomona-Pitzer	12–11	6–4		
1983–84	Pomona-Pitzer	9–17	6–6		
1984–85	Pomona-Pitzer	11–14	7–5		
1985–86	Pomona-Pitzer	16–12	8–2	1st	NCAA D-III regional fourth place
**Pomona-Pitzer Sagehens** (Southern California Intercollegiate Athletic Conference) (1987–1988)
1987–88	Pomona-Pitzer	7–19	4–6		
Pomona-Pitzer:		76–129	41–49		
Total:		76–129			
National champion Postseason invitational champion Conference regular season champion Conference regular season and conference tournament champion Division regular season champion Division regular season and conference tournament champion Conference tournament champion

=== NBA ===
NBA record

Legend
Regular season	G	Games coached	W	Games won	L	Games lost	W–L %	Win–loss %
Playoffs	PG	Playoff games	PW	Playoff wins	PL	Playoff losses	PW–L %	Playoff win–loss %

Team	Year	G	W	L	W–L%	Finish	PG	PW	PL	PW–L%	Result
San Antonio	1996–97	64	17	47	.266	6th in Midwest	—	—	—	—	Missed playoffs
San Antonio	1997–98	82	56	26	.683	2nd in Midwest	9	4	5	.444	Lost in conference semifinals
San Antonio	1998–99	50	37	13	.740	1st in Midwest	17	15	2	.882	**Won NBA championship**
San Antonio	1999–00	82	53	29	.646	2nd in Midwest	4	1	3	.250	Lost in first round
San Antonio	2000–01	82	58	24	.707	1st in Midwest	13	7	6	.538	Lost in conference finals
San Antonio	2001–02	82	58	24	.707	1st in Midwest	10	4	6	.400	Lost in conference semifinals
San Antonio	2002–03	82	60	22	.732	1st in Midwest	24	16	8	.667	**Won NBA championship**
San Antonio	2003–04	82	57	25	.695	2nd in Midwest	10	6	4	.600	Lost in conference semifinals
San Antonio	2004–05	82	59	23	.720	1st in Southwest	23	16	7	.696	**Won NBA championship**
San Antonio	2005–06	82	63	19	.768	1st in Southwest	13	7	6	.538	Lost in conference semifinals
San Antonio	2006–07	82	58	24	.707	2nd in Southwest	20	16	4	.800	**Won NBA championship**
San Antonio	2007–08	82	56	26	.683	2nd in Southwest	17	9	8	.529	Lost in conference finals
San Antonio	2008–09	82	54	28	.659	1st in Southwest	5	1	4	.200	Lost in first round
San Antonio	2009–10	82	50	32	.610	2nd in Southwest	10	4	6	.400	Lost in conference semifinals
San Antonio	2010–11	82	61	21	.744	1st in Southwest	6	2	4	.333	Lost in first round
San Antonio	2011–12	66	50	16	.758	1st in Southwest	14	10	4	.714	Lost in conference finals
San Antonio	2012–13	82	58	24	.707	1st in Southwest	21	15	6	.714	Lost in NBA Finals
San Antonio	2013–14	82	62	20	.756	1st in Southwest	23	16	7	.696	**Won NBA championship**
San Antonio	2014–15	82	55	27	.671	3rd in Southwest	7	3	4	.429	Lost in first round
San Antonio	2015–16	82	67	15	.817	1st in Southwest	10	6	4	.600	Lost in conference semifinals
San Antonio	2016–17	82	61	21	.744	1st in Southwest	16	8	8	.500	Lost in conference finals
San Antonio	2017–18	82	47	35	.573	3rd in Southwest	5	1	4	.200	Lost in first round
San Antonio	2018–19	82	48	34	.585	2nd in Southwest	7	3	4	.429	Lost in first round
San Antonio	2019–20	71	32	39	.451	4th in Southwest	—	—	—	—	Missed playoffs
San Antonio	2020–21	72	33	39	.458	3rd in Southwest	—	—	—	—	Missed playoffs
San Antonio	2021–22	82	34	48	.415	4th in Southwest	—	—	—	—	Missed playoffs
San Antonio	2022–23	82	22	60	.268	5th in Southwest	—	—	—	—	Missed playoffs
San Antonio	2023–24	82	22	60	.268	5th in Southwest	—	—	—	—	Missed playoffs
San Antonio	2024–25	5	2	3	.400	4th in Southwest	—	—	—	—	Resigned
Career		2,214	1,390	824	.628		284	170	114	.599	

=== National team ===
Team	Year	G	W	L	W–L%	Tournament	TG	TW	TL	PW–L%	Result
United States	2019	12	9	3	.750	World Cup	8	6	2	.750	7th place
United States	2021	10	7	3	.700	Olympics	6	5	1	.833	Won gold medal
Career		22	16	6	.727		14	11	3	.786	

== See also ==
- List of NBA championship head coaches
