= 1998–99 San Antonio Spurs season =

- NBA champions
- Conference champions
- Division champions
- Head coach: Gregg Popovich
- President: Gregg Popovich (vice)
- General manager: Gregg Popovich
- Owner: Peter Holt
- Arena: Alamodome

Results
- Record: 37–13 (.740)
- Place: Division: 1st (Midwest); Conference: 1st (Western)
- Playoff finish: NBA champions (Defeated Knicks 4–1)
- Stats at Basketball Reference

Local media
- Television: KSAT-TV; KRRT; Fox Sports Southwest
- Radio: 1200 WOAI

The 1998–99 San Antonio Spurs season was the 23rd season for the San Antonio Spurs in the National Basketball Association, and their 32nd season as a franchise. Due to a lockout, the regular season began on February 5, 1999, and was cut from 82 games to 50.

== Season summary ==
=== Off-season ===
During the off-season, the Spurs acquired second-year guard Antonio Daniels from the Vancouver Grizzlies on draft day, acquired three-point specialist Steve Kerr from the Chicago Bulls, and signed free agents Mario Elie, and Jerome Kersey.

=== Regular season ===
With the addition of Elie, Kerr and Kersey, and after a promising rookie season from second-year star Tim Duncan, the Spurs got off to a slow start to the regular season by posting a 6–8 record in February. However, the team posted a nine-game winning streak in March afterwards, posted a six-game winning streak between March and April, posted a seven-game winning streak in April, and won their final five games of the season. The Spurs finished in first place in the Midwest Division with a league-best 37–13 record, which was roughly equivalent to 61–21 in a full season, and earned the first seed in the Western Conference.

Duncan averaged 21.7 points, 11.4 rebounds and 2.5 blocks per game, and was named to the All-NBA First Team, and to the NBA All-Defensive First Team, while David Robinson averaged 15.8 points, 10.0 rebounds, 1.4 steals and 2.4 blocks per game, and Sean Elliott provided the team with 11.2 points and 4.3 rebounds per game. In addition, Avery Johnson provided with 9.7 points and 7.4 assists per game, while Elie also contributed 9.7 points per game. Off the bench, three-point specialist Jaren Jackson contributed 6.4 points per game, while Malik Rose averaged 6.0 points and 3.9 rebounds per game, Daniels provided with 4.7 points and 2.3 assists per game, Kerr contributed 4.4 points per game, and Kersey averaged 3.2 points and 2.9 rebounds per game, but only shot .340 in field-goal percentage.

Duncan finished in third place in Most Valuable Player voting, behind Karl Malone of the Utah Jazz, and Alonzo Mourning of the Miami Heat, while Robinson finished in twelfth place; Robinson also finished in fourth place in Defensive Player of the Year voting, while Duncan finished tied in fifth place, and head coach Gregg Popovich finished tied in sixth place in Coach of the Year voting. The Spurs finished second in the NBA in home-game attendance behind the Chicago Bulls, with an attendance of 527,357 at the Alamodome during the regular season.

=== NBA playoffs ===
In the Western Conference First Round of the 1999 NBA playoffs, the Spurs faced off against the 8th–seeded Minnesota Timberwolves, a team that featured All-Star forward Kevin Garnett, Terrell Brandon and Joe Smith. The Spurs won Game 1 over the Timberwolves at home, 99–86 at the Alamodome, but then lost Game 2 at home, 80–71 as the Timberwolves evened the series. The Spurs won the next two games on the road, which included a Game 4 win over the Timberwolves at the Target Center, 92–85 to win the series in four games.

In the Western Conference Semi-finals, the team faced off against the 4th–seeded Los Angeles Lakers, who were led by the All-Star trio of Shaquille O'Neal, Kobe Bryant and Glen Rice. The Spurs won the first two games over the Lakers at the Alamodome, and then won the next two games on the road, including a Game 4 win over the Lakers at the Great Western Forum, 118–107 to win the series in a four-game sweep.

In the Western Conference Finals, the Spurs then faced off against the 2nd–seeded, and Pacific Division champion Portland Trail Blazers, who were led by Isaiah Rider, Rasheed Wallace and Damon Stoudamire. After winning Game 1 at the Alamodome, 80–76, the Spurs trailed by 17 points against the Trail Blazers in Game 2; however, the Spurs made a fourth-quarter run that culminated with a game-winning three-pointer from Elliott, which was dubbed as the "Memorial Day Miracle" as the team defeated the Trail Blazers at home, 86–85. The Spurs won the next two games on the road, which included a Game 4 win over the Trail Blazers at the Rose Garden Arena, 94–80 to win the series in another four-game sweep, becoming the first former ABA team to advance to the NBA Finals.

In the 1999 NBA Finals, the Spurs faced off against the 8th–seeded New York Knicks, a team that featured Allan Houston, sixth man Latrell Sprewell, and Larry Johnson. The Knicks were without All-Star center Patrick Ewing, who was out due to a ruptured Achilles tendon injury, in which he sustained during Game 2 of the Eastern Conference Finals against the Indiana Pacers. The Spurs won the first two games over the Knicks at home at the Alamodome, and took a 2–0 series lead, before losing Game 3 on the road, 89–81 at Madison Square Garden. The Spurs managed to win their next two road games, including a Game 5 win over the Knicks at Madison Square Garden, 78–77, in which Avery Johnson hit the title-winning shot. The Spurs won the series over the Knicks in five games, winning their first ever NBA championship in franchise history, as Duncan was named the NBA Finals Most Valuable Player.

In 2024, HoopsHype would list the 1998–99 Spurs as the team with the 24th easiest route to an NBA Finals championship, due to the opponents they faced in the first round, and the Finals in particular. Kerr, who previously won three consecutive championships with the Chicago Bulls, won his fourth consecutive NBA title.

=== Aftermath ===
Following the season, Will Perdue re-signed as a free agent with his former team, the Bulls.

== Offseason ==
On June 24, 1998, the Spurs traded forward Carl Herrera, and first-round draft pick Felipe Lopez to the Vancouver Grizzlies in exchange for guard Antonio Daniels. The team also signed free agents Mario Elie, Steve Kerr and Jerome Kersey during the off-season.

=== NBA draft ===
Round	Pick	Player	Position	Nationality	College
1	24	Felipe López	Guard	Dominican Republic	St. John's
2	52	Derrick Dial	Guard	United States	Eastern Michigan

== Roster ==
1998–99 San Antonio Spurs roster
Players

Pos.	No.	Player	Height	Weight	DOB	From
G	33	Antonio Daniels	6 ft 4 in (1.93 m)	205 lb (93 kg)	1975–03–19	Bowling Green
F/C	21	Tim Duncan	6 ft 11 in (2.11 m)	250 lb (113 kg)	1976–04–25	Wake Forest
G/F	17	Mario Elie	6 ft 5 in (1.96 m)	210 lb (95 kg)	1963–11–26	American International
F	32	Sean Elliott	6 ft 8 in (2.03 m)	205 lb (93 kg)	1968–02–02	Arizona
G/F	10	Andrew Gaze	6 ft 7 in (2.01 m)	205 lb (93 kg)	1965–07–24	Seton Hall
G	2	Jaren Jackson	6 ft 4 in (1.93 m)	190 lb (86 kg)	1967–10–27	Georgetown
G	6	Avery Johnson	5 ft 10 in (1.78 m)	175 lb (79 kg)	1965–03–25	Southern
G	4	Steve Kerr	6 ft 3 in (1.91 m)	175 lb (79 kg)	1965–09–29	Arizona
F	25	Jerome Kersey	6 ft 7 in (2.01 m)	215 lb (98 kg)	1962–06–26	Longwood
F	54	Gerard King	6 ft 9 in (2.06 m)	230 lb (104 kg)	1972–11–25	Nicholls State
C	41	Will Perdue	7 ft 0 in (2.13 m)	240 lb (109 kg)	1965–08–29	Vanderbilt
C	50	David Robinson	7 ft 1 in (2.16 m)	235 lb (107 kg)	1965–08–06	Navy
F	31	Malik Rose	6 ft 7 in (2.01 m)	250 lb (113 kg)	1974–11–23	Drexel
G	11	Brandon Williams	6 ft 6 in (1.98 m)	215 lb (98 kg)	1975–02–27	Davidson

Coaches
Head coach
- Gregg Popovich
Assistant(s)
- Mike Budenholzer
- Hank Egan
- Paul Pressey

Legend
- (DP) Unsigned draft pick
- (FA) Free agent
- (S) Suspended
- Injured

Roster

== Regular season ==
=== Season standings ===
Midwest Division	W	L	PCT	GB	Home	Road	Div
y-San Antonio Spurs	37	13	.740	–	21–4	16–9	17–4
x-Utah Jazz	37	13	.740	–	22–3	15–10	15–3
x-Houston Rockets	31	19	.620	6	19–6	12–13	12–9
x-Minnesota Timberwolves	25	25	.500	12	18–7	7–18	11–9
Dallas Mavericks	19	31	.380	18	15–10	4–21	8–12
Denver Nuggets	14	36	.280	23	12–13	2–23	5–16
Vancouver Grizzlies	8	42	.160	29	7–18	1–24	3–18

#	Western Conference				
#	Team	W	L	PCT	GB
1	z-San Antonio Spurs	37	13	.740	–
2	y-Portland Trail Blazers	35	15	.700	2
3	x-Utah Jazz	37	13	.740	–
4	x-Los Angeles Lakers	31	19	.620	6
5	x-Houston Rockets	31	19	.620	6
6	x-Sacramento Kings	27	23	.540	10
7	x-Phoenix Suns	27	23	.540	10
8	x-Minnesota Timberwolves	25	25	.500	12
9	Seattle SuperSonics	25	25	.500	12
10	Golden State Warriors	21	29	.420	16
11	Dallas Mavericks	19	31	.380	18
12	Denver Nuggets	14	36	.280	23
13	Los Angeles Clippers	9	41	.180	28
14	Vancouver Grizzlies	8	42	.160	29

z - clinched division title
y - clinched division title
x - clinched playoff spot

== Game log ==
=== Regular season ===
1998–99 game log
Total: 37–13 (Home: 21–4; Road: 16–9)
February: 6–8 (home: 4–3; road: 2–5)

Game	Date	Team	Score	High points	High rebounds	High assists	Location Attendance	Record
1	February 5	Sacramento	W 101–83	Tim Duncan (19)	Tim Duncan (17)	Avery Johnson (6)	Alamodome; 19,002	1–0
2	February 6	Minnesota	W 96–82	Duncan, Elliott (22)	Tim Duncan (14)	Avery Johnson (9)	Alamodome; 21,319	2–0
3	February 8	L. A. Lakers	L 75–80	Tim Duncan (19)	Tim Duncan (15)	Mario Elie (6)	Alamodome; 33,788	2–1
4	February 9	@ Minnesota	L 70–74	David Robinson (16)	Robinson, Duncan (11)	Avery Johnson (10)	Target Center; 16,422	2–2
5	February 11	@ Cleveland	L 89–99	Tim Duncan (31)	Tim Duncan (14)	Avery Johnson (7)	Gund Arena; 14,228	2–3
6	February 12	@ Philadelphia	W 98–94	Malik Rose (22)	Malik Rose (9)	Avery Johnson (5)	First Union Center; 16,892	3–3
7	February 14	@ Chicago	W 89–76	David Robinson (22)	Tim Duncan (14)	Tim Duncan (4)	United Center; 22,386	4–3
8	February 17	Phoenix	L 76–79	Tim Duncan (20)	Tim Duncan (12)	Avery Johnson (7)	Alamodome; 16,419	4–4
9	February 19	@ L. A. Lakers	L 94–106	Tim Duncan (26)	Tim Duncan (11)	Mario Elie (4)	Great Western Forum; 17,505	4–5
10	February 21	Detroit	W 85–64	Tim Duncan (17)	Tim Duncan (14)	Avery Johnson (5)	Alamodome; 19,495	5–5
11	February 22	@ Minnesota	L 89–95	Avery Johnson (20)	David Robinson (17)	Avery Johnson (5)	Target Center; 15,374	5–6
12	February 24	Seattle	W 99–81	David Robinson (29)	David Robinson (17)	Avery Johnson (7)	Alamodome; 15,209	6–6
13	February 26	@ Seattle	L 82–92	Tim Duncan (22)	David Robinson (14)	Avery Johnson (8)	KeyArena; 17,072	6–7
14	February 28	Utah	L 87–101	Tim Duncan (21)	Tim Duncan (13)	Mario Elie (6)	Alamodome; 18,165	6–8

March: 14–2 (home: 6–1; road: 8–1)

Game	Date	Team	Score	High points	High rebounds	High assists	Location Attendance	Record
15	March 2	@ Houston	W 99–82	Tim Duncan (23)	Tim Duncan (14)	Avery Johnson (13)	Compaq Center; 16,285	7–8
16	March 4	@ Dallas	W 95–79	Tim Duncan (26)	Tim Duncan (12)	Avery Johnson (10)	Reunion Arena; 14,719	8–8
17	March 6	L. A. Clippers	W 114–85	Tim Duncan (27)	David Robinson (10)	Avery Johnson (10)	Alamodome; 18,394	9–8
18	March 7	@ Denver	W 106–96	Tim Duncan (34)	Tim Duncan (13)	Avery Johnson (14)	McNichols Sports Arena; 12,037	10–8
19	March 10	Orlando	W 81–79	David Robinson (19)	Tim Duncan (11)	Avery Johnson (8)	Alamodome; 17,954	11–8
20	March 12	@ Phoenix	W 99–97	Tim Duncan (26)	David Robinson (15)	Avery Johnson (8)	America West Arena; 19,023	12–8
21	March 13	Denver	W 92–61	Tim Duncan (27)	Duncan, Perdue (8)	Avery Johnson (8)	Alamodome; 32,982	13–8
22	March 16	@ Sacramento	W 121–109	Tim Duncan (29)	Tim Duncan (12)	Avery Johnson (15)	ARCO Arena; 14,570	14–8
23	March 17	@ Golden State	W 82–78	Duncan, Rose (17)	Tim Duncan (17)	Avery Johnson (6)	The Arena in Oakland; 10,257	15–8
24	March 19	@ Portland	L 85–90	Tim Duncan (29)	Tim Duncan (15)	Avery Johnson (8)	Rose Garden Arena; 20,041	15–9
25	March 20	@ Vancouver	W 92–88 (OT)	Tim Duncan (24)	Tim Duncan (14)	Avery Johnson (9)	General Motors Place; 19,193	16–9
26	March 23	Denver	W 112–82	Tim Duncan (19)	David Robinson (9)	Avery Johnson (7)	Alamodome; 16,501	17–9
27	March 25	@ Denver	W 86–65	Tim Duncan (28)	David Robinson (13)	David Robinson (5)	McNichols Sports Arena; 10,695	18–9
28	March 26	Toronto	L 91–93	David Robinson (24)	David Robinson (16)	Avery Johnson (11)	Alamodome; 16,290	18–10
29	March 27	Dallas	W 99–77	Tim Duncan (21)	Tim Duncan (15)	Avery Johnson (8)	Alamodome; 25,921	19–10
30	March 30	Seattle	W 95–87	Tim Duncan (26)	David Robinson (10)	Avery Johnson (9)	Alamodome; 16,565	20–10

April: 13–3 (home: 9–0; road: 4–3)

Game	Date	Team	Score	High points	High rebounds	High assists	Location Attendance	Record
31	April 1	Vancouver	W 103–91	Tim Duncan (39)	Tim Duncan (13)	Avery Johnson (8)	Alamodome; 16,384	21–10
32	April 3	L. A. Clippers	W 103–82	Robinson, Elie (19)	David Robinson (13)	Avery Johnson (8)	Alamodome; 17,915	22–10
33	April 5	Golden State	W 93–86	Robinson, Duncan (25)	David Robinson (16)	Avery Johnson (4)	Alamodome; 14,773	23–10
34	April 8	@ Houston	W 92–83	Sean Elliott (19)	Tim Duncan (13)	Avery Johnson (10)	Compaq Center; 16,285	24–10
35	April 10	@ Phoenix	L 84–110	Tim Duncan (21)	Tim Duncan (10)	Avery Johnson (6)	America West Arena; 19,023	24–11
36	April 12	Phoenix	W 94–77	Tim Duncan (26)	David Robinson (13)	Duncan, Elliott (4)	Alamodome; 14,352	25–11
37	April 13	@ Dallas	L 86–92	David Robinson (22)	Tim Duncan (11)	Avery Johnson (5)	Reunion Arena; 13,142	25–12
38	April 14	Minnesota	W 95–79	David Robinson (21)	David Robinson (15)	Avery Johnson (6)	Alamodome; 15,864	26–12
39	April 16	Portland	W 81–80	Robinson, Duncan (20)	Tim Duncan (12)	Avery Johnson (8)	Alamodome; 21,368	27–12
40	April 18	Houston	W 86–83	Mario Elie (21)	David Robinson (14)	Johnson, Duncan (8)	Alamodome; 24,077	28–12
41	April 20	@ Utah	W 83–69	Tim Duncan (36)	Robinson, Rose (11)	Johnson, Duncan (8)	Delta Center; 19,911	29–12
42	April 22	Dallas	W 103–76	David Robinson (18)	Tim Duncan (10)	Avery Johnson (8)	Alamodome; 18,720	30–12
43	April 24	L. A. Lakers	W 108–81	Tim Duncan (21)	Tim Duncan (13)	Avery Johnson (12)	Alamodome; 31,972	31–12
44	April 26	@ L. A. Clippers	W 94–88	Tim Duncan (22)	Robinson, Kersey (7)	Johnson, Duncan (7)	Los Angeles Memorial Sports Arena; 8,260	32–12
45	April 27	@ Sacramento	L 100–104 (OT)	Tim Duncan (32)	Tim Duncan (19)	Avery Johnson (12)	ARCO Arena; 16,776	32–13
46	April 29	@ Vancouver	W 99–72	Tim Duncan (19)	Tim Duncan (10)	Avery Johnson (8)	General Motors Place; 18,448	33–13

May: 4–0 (home: 2–0; road: 2–0)

Game	Date	Team	Score	High points	High rebounds	High assists	Location Attendance	Record
47	May 1	Portland	W 98–90 (OT)	David Robinson (26)	Robinson, Duncan (12)	Avery Johnson (8)	Alamodome; 28,806	34–13
48	May 2	Utah	W 84–78	Tim Duncan (26)	Tim Duncan (14)	Avery Johnson (3)	Alamodome; 35,122	35–13
49	May 4	@ Portland	W 87–81	David Robinson (29)	David Robinson (12)	Duncan, Johnson (6)	Rose Garden Arena; 20,715	36–13
50	May 5	@ Golden State	W 88–81	Tim Duncan (28)	David Robinson (20)	Sean Elliott (6)	The Arena in Oakland; 17,235	37–13

1998–99 schedule

=== Playoffs ===
1999 playoff game log
First Round: 3–1 (home: 1–1; road: 2–0)

Game	Date	Team	Score	High points	High rebounds	High assists	Location Attendance	Series
1	May 9	Minnesota	W 99–86	Tim Duncan (26)	Tim Duncan (12)	Avery Johnson (10)	Alamodome; 22,356	1–0
2	May 11	Minnesota	L 71–80	Tim Duncan (18)	Tim Duncan (16)	Mario Elie (4)	Alamodome; 22,494	1–1
3	May 13	@ Minnesota	W 85–71	Avery Johnson (24)	David Robinson (18)	Duncan, Robinson (7)	Target Center; 17,444	2–1
4	May 15	@ Minnesota	W 92–85	David Robinson (19)	David Robinson (11)	Avery Johnson (6)	Target Center; 15,898	3–1

Conference Semifinals: 4–0 (home: 2–0; road: 2–0)

Game	Date	Team	Score	High points	High rebounds	High assists	Location Attendance	Series
1	May 17	L.A. Lakers	W 87–81	Tim Duncan (25)	Will Perdue (9)	Avery Johnson (8)	Alamodome; 25,297	1–0
2	May 19	L.A. Lakers	W 79–76	Tim Duncan (21)	Tim Duncan (8)	Avery Johnson (10)	Alamodome; 33,293	2–0
3	May 22	@ L.A. Lakers	W 103–91	Tim Duncan (37)	Tim Duncan (14)	Avery Johnson (7)	Great Western Forum; 17,505	3–0
4	May 23	@ L.A. Lakers	W 118–107	Tim Duncan (33)	Tim Duncan (14)	Avery Johnson (10)	Great Western Forum; 17,505	4–0

Conference Finals: 4–0 (home: 2–0; road: 2–0)

Game	Date	Team	Score	High points	High rebounds	High assists	Location Attendance	Series
1	May 29	Portland	W 80–76	Duncan, Robinson (21)	Tim Duncan (13)	Avery Johnson (9)	Alamodome; 35,165	1–0
2	May 31	Portland	W 86–85	Tim Duncan (23)	Tim Duncan (10)	Avery Johnson (7)	Alamodome; 35,260	2–0
3	June 4	@ Portland	W 85–63	Jaren Jackson (19)	David Robinson (9)	Avery Johnson (8)	Rose Garden; 20,732	3–0
4	June 6	@ Portland	W 94–80	David Robinson (20)	David Robinson (10)	Avery Johnson (6)	Rose Garden; 20,735	4–0

NBA Finals: 4–1 (home: 2–0; road: 2–1)

Game	Date	Team	Score	High points	High rebounds	High assists	Location Attendance	Series
1	June 16	New York	W 89–77	Tim Duncan (33)	Tim Duncan (16)	Avery Johnson (8)	Alamodome; 39,514	1–0
2	June 18	New York	W 80–67	Tim Duncan (25)	Tim Duncan (15)	Avery Johnson (5)	Alamodome; 39,554	2–0
3	June 21	@ New York	L 81–89	David Robinson (25)	Tim Duncan (12)	Avery Johnson (4)	Madison Square Garden; 19,763	2–1
4	June 23	@ New York	W 96–89	Tim Duncan (28)	Tim Duncan (18)	Avery Johnson (10)	Madison Square Garden; 19,763	3–1
5	June 25	@ New York	W 78–77	Tim Duncan (31)	David Robinson (12)	Avery Johnson (9)	Madison Square Garden; 19,763	4–1

1999 schedule

== Player statistics ==
=== Regular season ===
Player	POS	GP	GS	MP	REB	AST	STL	BLK	PTS	MPG	RPG	APG	SPG	BPG	PPG
Tim Duncan	PF	50	50	1,963	571	121	45	126	1,084	39.3	11.4	2.4	.9	2.5	21.7
Avery Johnson	PG	50	50	1,672	118	369	51	11	487	33.4	2.4	7.4	1.0	.2	9.7
Sean Elliott	SF	50	50	1,509	213	117	26	17	561	30.2	4.3	2.3	.5	.3	11.2
David Robinson	C	49	49	1,554	492	103	69	119	775	31.7	10.0	2.1	1.4	2.4	15.8
Mario Elie	SG	47	37	1,291	137	89	46	12	455	27.5	2.9	1.9	1.0	.3	9.7
Jaren Jackson	SG	47	13	861	99	49	41	9	301	18.3	2.1	1.0	.9	.2	6.4
Antonio Daniels	PG	47	0	614	54	106	30	6	220	13.1	1.1	2.3	.6	.1	4.7
Malik Rose	PF	47	0	608	182	29	40	22	284	12.9	3.9	.6	.9	.5	6.0
Jerome Kersey	SF	45	0	699	130	41	37	14	145	15.5	2.9	.9	.8	.3	3.2
Steve Kerr	PG	44	0	734	44	49	23	3	192	16.7	1.0	1.1	.5	.1	4.4
Will Perdue	C	37	1	445	138	18	9	10	90	12.0	3.7	.5	.2	.3	2.4
Gerard King	SF	19	0	63	14	4	2	1	23	3.3	.7	.2	.1	.1	1.2
Andrew Gaze	SG	19	0	58	5	6	2	1	21	3.1	.3	.3	.1	.1	1.1
Brandon Williams	SG	3	0	4	1	0	0	0	2	1.3	.3	.0	.0	.0	.7

=== Playoffs ===
Player	POS	GP	GS	MP	REB	AST	STL	BLK	PTS	MPG	RPG	APG	SPG	BPG	PPG
Tim Duncan	PF	17	17	733	195	48	13	45	395	43.1	11.5	2.8	.8	2.6	23.2
Avery Johnson	PG	17	17	653	42	126	20	1	215	38.4	2.5	7.4	1.2	.1	12.6
David Robinson	C	17	17	600	168	43	28	40	265	35.3	9.9	2.5	1.6	2.4	15.6
Sean Elliott	SF	17	17	574	58	45	9	4	203	33.8	3.4	2.6	.5	.2	11.9
Mario Elie	SG	17	17	526	59	50	22	2	135	30.9	3.5	2.9	1.3	.1	7.9
Jaren Jackson	SG	17	0	345	41	18	13	0	140	20.3	2.4	1.1	.8	.0	8.2
Malik Rose	PF	17	0	194	39	3	7	4	46	11.4	2.3	.2	.4	.2	2.7
Antonio Daniels	PG	15	0	106	10	16	4	0	27	7.1	.7	1.1	.3	.0	1.8
Jerome Kersey	SF	14	0	152	30	4	6	1	36	10.9	2.1	.3	.4	.1	2.6
Will Perdue	C	12	0	86	28	0	0	1	13	7.2	2.3	.0	.0	.1	1.1
Steve Kerr	PG	11	0	97	9	8	2	0	24	8.8	.8	.7	.2	.0	2.2
Gerard King	SF	8	0	14	4	1	0	1	4	1.8	.5	.1	.0	.1	.5

== NBA Finals ==
The 1999 NBA Finals saw some firsts for both the Spurs and the opposing New York Knicks.

The Spurs:

- Became the first former ABA team to play and win in an NBA Finals. (This feat would be duplicated by the Denver Nuggets in 2023.)
- Attracted record crowds for the two games at the Alamodome. Attendance was 39,514 for Game 1 and 39,554 for Game 2 (the largest crowd to see an NBA Finals game).
- Steve Kerr became the first non-Celtic to win four straight championships, as he won titles with the Bulls from 1996 to 1998.

The Knicks became the first 8th seed to ever play in an NBA Finals. (This feat would be duplicated by the Miami Heat in 2023.)

=== Summary ===
The following scoring summary is written in a line score format, except that the quarter numbers are replaced by game numbers.

Team	Game 1	Game 2	Game 3	Game 4	Game 5	Wins
San Antonio (West)	89	80	81	96	78	4
New York (East)	77	67	89	89	77	1

With time running out in Game 5, and the 1999 championship on the line, the Spurs looked to Avery Johnson as he hit a long clutch 2 from the corner with 47 seconds to go, giving the Spurs a 1-point lead. It was considered one of the franchise's best moments since the first 26 years in San Antonio.

=== Schedule ===
- Game 1 - June 16, Wednesday @San Antonio, San Antonio 89, New York 77: San Antonio leads series 1-0
- Game 2 - June 18, Friday @San Antonio, San Antonio 80, New York 67: San Antonio leads series 2-0
- Game 3 - June 21, Monday @New York, New York 89, San Antonio 81: San Antonio leads series 2-1
- Game 4 - June 23, Wednesday @New York, San Antonio 96, New York 89: San Antonio leads series 3-1
- Game 5 - June 25, Friday @New York, San Antonio 78, New York 77: San Antonio wins series 4-1

The Finals were played using a 2-3-2 site format, where the first two and last two games are held at the team with home court advantage. The NBA, after experimenting in the early years, restored this original format for the Finals in 1985. So far, the other playoff series are still running on a 2-2-1-1-1 site format.

== Award winners ==
- Tim Duncan, Forward, All-NBA First Team
- Tim Duncan, Forward, All-NBA Defensive First Team
- Tim Duncan, Forward, NBA Finals MVP
