= Jaren Jackson =

American basketball player (born 1967)

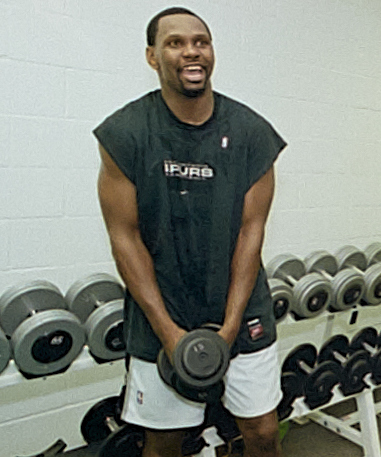
- Jackson with the San Antonio Spurs in 2000

Incarnate Word Cardinals
- Title: Assistant coach
- League: Southland Conference

Personal information
- Born: October 27, 1967 (age 59) New Orleans, Louisiana, U.S.
- Listed height: 6 ft 6 in (1.98 m)
- Listed weight: 225 lb (102 kg)

Career information
- High school: Walter Cohen (New Orleans, Louisiana)
- College: Georgetown (1985–1989)
- NBA draft: 1989: undrafted
- Playing career: 1989–2002
- Position: Shooting guard
- Number: 14, 11, 8, 21, 12, 32, 2
- Coaching career: 2005–present

Career history

Playing
- 1989–1990: New Jersey Nets
- 1990–1991: Wichita Falls Texans
- 1991–1992: La Crosse Catbirds
- 1992: Golden State Warriors
- 1992: La Crosse Catbirds
- 1992–1993: Los Angeles Clippers
- 1993: La Crosse Catbirds
- 1993–1994: Portland Trail Blazers
- 1994–1995: Philadelphia 76ers
- 1995: Pittsburgh Piranhas
- 1995–1996: ASVEL Lyon-Villeurbanne
- 1996: Houston Rockets
- 1996: Fort Wayne Fury
- 1996–1997: Washington Bullets
- 1997–2001: San Antonio Spurs
- 2002: Orlando Magic

Coaching
- 2005–2006: Gary Steelheads
- 2006–2007: Pittsburgh Xplosion
- 2007–2008: Fort Wayne Mad Ants (assistant)
- 2008–2009: Fort Wayne Mad Ants
- 2011–2012: Saint John Mill Rats
- 2013–2014: Ottawa SkyHawks
- 2014–2015: Fort Wayne Mad Ants (assistant)
- 2021–2023: Westchester Knicks (assistant)
- 2023–present: Incarnate Word (assistant)

Career highlights
- NBA champion (1999); French Cup champion (1996); CBA champion (1992)

Career NBA statistics
- Points: 2,370 (5.5 ppg)
- Rebounds: 786 (1.8 rpg)
- Assists: 500 (1.2 apg)
- Stats at NBA.com
- Stats at Basketball Reference

Jaren Walter Jackson Sr. (born October 27, 1967) is an American professional basketball coach and former player who is an assistant coach for the Incarnate Word Cardinals of the Southland Conference. A shooting guard born in New Orleans, Louisiana, Jackson played at Georgetown University from 1985 to 1989 and graduated with a bachelor's degree in finance. He was never drafted into the National Basketball Association (NBA) but played 13 seasons for multiple teams. He is best known for his tenure with the San Antonio Spurs, whom he helped win their first NBA championship in 1999.

== Career ==
=== Traveling swingman (1989–1997) ===
Upon graduating, Jackson was not drafted, but was first signed as a free agent by the New Jersey Nets in 1989. That year he played in only 28 games, and the following season would play in the Continental Basketball Association and the World Basketball League. He had a very short stint with the Golden State Warriors before signing with the Los Angeles Clippers for whom he played just 34 games in the 1992–93 season. The following year, he was signed and played just 29 games for the Portland Trail Blazers, but he was waived by Portland and picked up by the Philadelphia 76ers, where he started his first NBA game on December 17, 1994. Jackson would again be waived and wouldn't return to action until the following year for another very short stint with the Houston Rockets before being signed by the Washington Bullets prior to the 1996–97 season.

It was with the Bullets that Jackson played his longest NBA season, as he played in 75 games for the season as backup to Calbert Cheaney, with an average of 5 points a game and a career-high 53 three-point field goals.

=== San Antonio Spurs (1997–2001) ===
In the offseason, following a playoff loss to the eventual champion Chicago Bulls, Jackson signed with the San Antonio Spurs, who had suffered a lottery season the previous year but featured superstar David Robinson and the first pick in the 1997 draft, Tim Duncan. The 1997–98 season would prove to be a personal best for Jackson, as he started in 45 of 82 games and averaged a career-high 8.8 points a game and a new career high of 112 three-pointers for the year. Jackson also saw his most significant playoff action, as the Spurs won in the first round of the playoffs before losing in the conference semifinals. Jackson started in 8 of 9 playoff games and increased his scoring average to 10.2 points for the postseason.

The following year would be shortened to 50 games as a result of a league lockout, but the Spurs would continue to use Jackson as its main back up shooting guard behind veteran Mario Elie. Jackson would play in 47 games, starting in 13 and averaged 6.4 points a game. The Spurs would win the number one seed in the playoffs led by Robinson and Duncan, and open the playoffs with a 3–1 first-round win over the Minnesota Timberwolves, before dominating and sweeping the Los Angeles Lakers in 4 games of the conference semifinals. Against the Lakers Jackson played well, scoring 22 points in game 3 followed by 20 points in game 4 to close the series in which he hit 6 three-point shots. The Spurs would next faced Portland in the conference finals, but were once again dominant, with teammate Sean Elliott hitting a crucial three-point shot to win game 2 and Jackson scoring 19 points in game 3. The Spurs completed another sweep, and would face the New York Knicks in the NBA Finals. Jackson scored 17 points in his first Finals game, and the Spurs would win both games in San Antonio before heading to New York. Despite a win by the Knicks at home in game 3, the Spurs proved simply too dominating, and would win the next two games in Madison Square Garden to win the series and the NBA Championship. Jackson scored 11 points in the title clinching 5th game, and averaged 8.2 points throughout the title run.

Jackson would once again serve as the main backup at shooting guard for the defending champion Spurs the following season, playing in 81 games and starting in 12. The Spurs would end up losing in the first round of the playoffs to the Phoenix Suns mostly due to a season-ending injury to Duncan, and Jackson only played two games in the series. In the 2000–01 season, the Spurs won the best record in the league before losing in the conference finals, but Jackson only played in 16 games for the season and did not play in the postseason as the team had brought in younger guards such as Derek Anderson.

=== Retirement ===
Jackson was signed to play for the Orlando Magic for the latter portion of the 2001–02 season, and played in 9 regular season games and 3 playoff games before retiring.

== NBA career statistics ==
Legend
GP	Games played	GS	Games started	MPG	Minutes per game
FG%	Field goal percentage	3P%	3-point field goal percentage	FT%	Free throw percentage
RPG	Rebounds per game	APG	Assists per game	SPG	Steals per game
BPG	Blocks per game	PPG	Points per game	**Bold**	Career high
†	Won an NBA championship	*	Led the league

=== Regular season ===
Year	Team	GP	GS	MPG	FG%	3P%	FT%	RPG	APG	SPG	BPG	PPG
1989–90	New Jersey	28	0	5.7	.362	.000	.810	.9	.5	.5	.0	2.4
1991–92	Golden State	5	0	10.8	**.478**	–	.667	2.0	.6	.4	.0	5.2
1992–93	L.A. Clippers	34	0	10.3	.414	**.400**	.852	1.1	1.0	.6	.1	3.9
1993–94	Portland	29	0	6.4	.391	.000	**.857**	.6	.9	.1	.1	2.8
1994–95	Philadelphia	21	1	12.2	.368	.267	.667	2.0	.9	.4	**.2**	3.3
1995–96	Houston	4	0	8.3	.000	.000	.800	.8	.0	.3	.0	2.0
1996–97	Washington	75	0	15.1	.407	.335	.768	1.8	.9	.6	**.2**	5.0
1997–98	San Antonio	**82***	**45**	**27.1**	.394	.377	.797	**2.6**	**1.9**	.7	.1	**8.8**
1998–99†	San Antonio	47	13	18.3	.380	.361	.821	2.1	1.0	**.9**	**.2**	6.4
1999–00	San Antonio	81	12	20.9	.381	.353	.647	2.2	1.5	.7	.1	6.3
2000–01	San Antonio	16	0	7.2	.400	.389	.000	.8	.4	.3	.0	2.4
2001–02	Orlando	9	0	16.0	.405	.350	.500	1.9	.9	.6	.0	4.3
Career		431	71	16.7	.391	.353	.764	1.8	1.2	.6	.1	5.5

=== Playoffs ===
Year	Team	GP	GS	MPG	FG%	3P%	FT%	RPG	APG	SPG	BPG	PPG
1993	L.A. Clippers	4	0	7.0	**.385**	.000	–	1.3	.5	.5	.0	2.5
1994	Portland	1	0	1.0	–	–	–	.0	.0	.0	.0	.0
1997	Washington	3	0	3.7	–	–	.000	.7	.3	.0	.0	.0
1998	San Antonio	9	**8**	**35.4**	.341	.305	**.737**	**4.3**	**1.6**	.6	**.1**	**10.2**
1999†	San Antonio	**17**	0	20.3	.382	**.360**	.692	2.4	1.1	**.8**	.0	8.2
2000	San Antonio	2	0	9.5	.000	.000	.500	.5	1.0	.5	.0	1.0
2002	Orlando	3	0	1.4	–	–	–	.3	.0	.0	.0	.0
Career		39	8	18.6	.362	.333	.658	2.3	.9	.5	.0	6.3

== Coaching career ==
Jackson coached in the Continental Basketball Association (CBA) for the Gary Steelheads during the 2005–06 season and Pittsburgh Xplosion during the 2006–07 season.

Jackson had served as assistant coach of Fort Wayne Mad Ants with their first season in NBA Development League (D-League) before coaching their second season. Jackson returned to the Fort Wayne Mad Ants for the 2014–15 season.

Since retiring as a player, Jackson has held several basketball coaching positions at both the college and minor league level. He has been the head coach of the Saint John Millrats of the National Basketball League of Canada.

Jackson was named the head coach of the National Basketball League of Canada's Ottawa SkyHawks on November 25, 2013.

On January 19, 2021, the Westchester Knicks announced that they had hired Jackson as assistant coach.

On May 5, 2023, the University of the Incarnate Word announced that Jackson is being added as an assistant coach by new head coach Shane Heirman.

== Personal life ==
Jackson married fellow Hoya Terri Carmichael Jackson, the director of operations at the Women's National Basketball Players Association. They are the parents of Jaren Jackson Jr., who played college basketball for Michigan State before being selected 4th overall in the 2018 NBA draft by the Memphis Grizzlies. They divorced in 2026.
