= 1999 NBA Finals =

1999 basketball championship series

Team	Coach	Wins
San Antonio Spurs	Gregg Popovich	4
New York Knicks	Jeff Van Gundy	1
- Dates: June 16–25
- MVP: Tim Duncan (San Antonio Spurs)
- Hall of Famers: Spurs: Tim Duncan (2020); David Robinson (2009); Knicks: Patrick Ewing (2008; did not play); Coaches: Gregg Popovich (2023); Officials: Dick Bavetta (2015); Danny Crawford (2025); Hugh Evans (2022)
- Eastern finals: Knicks defeated Pacers, 4–2
- Western finals: Spurs defeated Trail Blazers, 4–0

The 1999 NBA Finals was the championship round of the shortened 1998–99 NBA season, and the conclusion of the season's playoffs. The Western Conference champion San Antonio Spurs took on the Eastern Conference champion New York Knicks for the title, with the Spurs holding home court advantage. The Spurs defeated the Knicks in five games to win their first NBA championship.

Until 2023, this was the only NBA Finals to feature an eighth-seeded team and the first time an eighth-seeded team won an NBA Finals game. The two teams would rematch in the 2026 NBA Finals, where the Knicks would defeat the Spurs 4-1, ending their title drought after 53 years.

== Background ==
The 1998–99 NBA season was shortened due to a labor dispute that led to a lockout. The owners and the National Basketball Players Association reached an agreement to end the dispute on January 20, 1999. The 1998–99 season, which began on February 5, 1999, was shortened from the usual 82-game schedule to 50 games per team. The three-time defending-champion Chicago Bulls did not make a fourth consecutive Finals after a roster turnover that saw Phil Jackson and Michael Jordan temporarily retire, and Scottie Pippen and Dennis Rodman move on to other teams.

=== San Antonio Spurs ===
The 1998–99 season was the second season of the "Twin Towers" pairing of David Robinson and star second-year forward Tim Duncan. Robinson and Duncan had been teammates since the Spurs drafted Duncan with the first overall pick in the 1997 NBA draft. The Spurs earned this draft pick through the draft lottery due to a 62-loss 1996–97 season in which Robinson had a season-ending injury and the team collapsed. During the 1996–97 season, veteran coach Bob Hill was fired and replaced by then-general manager Gregg Popovich. In the 1997–98 season, the Spurs won 56 games, but were eliminated in the second round of the playoffs by the Utah Jazz.

In the 1998–99 season, the Spurs recovered from a 6–8 start to the season to win 31 of their last 36 games. The Spurs qualified for the playoffs as the top seed in the Western Conference and tied the Utah Jazz for the league's best regular-season record (37–13).

After defeating the Minnesota Timberwolves in four games, San Antonio recorded back-to-back sweeps in the second round and the conference finals, defeating the Los Angeles Lakers and Portland Trail Blazers. The victory over Portland gave the Spurs their first-ever trip to the NBA Finals.

=== New York Knicks ===
The Knicks had a more difficult time reaching the playoffs than the Spurs did. Toward the end of the season, with the team teetering on the brink of making the playoffs, New York fired general manager Ernie Grunfeld. The Knicks barely qualified for the playoffs and received the eighth and final seed in the Eastern Conference.

The Knicks faced the Miami Heat, the top Eastern Conference seed, in the first round. When Allan Houston made a shot with 0.8 seconds remaining in Game 5 of that series, the Knicks were victorious and became the second team in NBA history after the 1993-94 Denver Nuggets to win a playoff series as the eighth seed.

The Knicks faced the Atlanta Hawks next. Hawks center Dikembe Mutombo guaranteed a victory, but the Knicks prevailed in a four-game sweep to set up a matchup with the Indiana Pacers in the Eastern Conference finals.

Knicks center Patrick Ewing was lost for the series after the first two games against Indiana. In the third game, with 11.9 seconds left and the Knicks trailing 91–88, the Knicks' Larry Johnson made a three-point shot while being fouled and converted the subsequent free throw for a game-winning four-point play; the victory gave the Knicks a 2–1 lead in the series. The Knicks won Game 6 and prevailed in the series, becoming the first team in North American sports history to reach a championship series as an eighth seed. However, without Ewing and with Larry Johnson spraining his MCL in Game 6 of the East Finals, the Knicks entered the Finals wounded.

This was the first NBA Finals appearance for the Knicks since 1994; Herb Williams was the only player from both the 1994 and 1999 teams.

=== Road to the Finals ===
San Antonio Spurs (Western Conference champion)		New York Knicks (Eastern Conference champion)
# / Western Conference; # / Team / W / L / PCT / GB; 1 / z-San Antonio Spurs / 37 / 13 / .740 / –; 2 / y-Portland Trail Blazers / 35 / 15 / .700 / 2; 3 / x-Utah Jazz / 37 / 13 / .740 / –; 4 / x-Los Angeles Lakers / 31 / 19 / .620 / 6; 5 / x-Houston Rockets / 31 / 19 / .620 / 6; 6 / x-Sacramento Kings / 27 / 23 / .540 / 10; 7 / x-Phoenix Suns / 27 / 23 / .540 / 10; 8 / x-Minnesota Timberwolves / 25 / 25 / .500 / 12; 9 / Seattle SuperSonics / 25 / 25 / .500 / 12; 10 / Golden State Warriors / 21 / 29 / .420 / 16; 11 / Dallas Mavericks / 19 / 31 / .380 / 18; 12 / Denver Nuggets / 14 / 36 / .280 / 23; 13 / Los Angeles Clippers / 9 / 41 / .180 / 28; 14 / Vancouver Grizzlies / 8 / 42 / .160 / 29; 1st seed in the West, best league record	Regular season	Eastern Conference: # / Team / W / L / PCT / GB / GP; 1 / c-Miami Heat * / 33 / 17 / .660 / – / 50; 2 / y-Indiana Pacers * / 33 / 17 / .660 / – / 50; 3 / x-Orlando Magic / 33 / 17 / .660 / – / 50; 4 / x-Atlanta Hawks / 31 / 19 / .620 / 2.0 / 50; 5 / x-Detroit Pistons / 29 / 21 / .580 / 4.0 / 50; 6 / x-Philadelphia 76ers / 28 / 22 / .560 / 5.0 / 50; 7 / x-Milwaukee Bucks / 28 / 22 / .560 / 5.0 / 50; 8 / x-New York Knicks / 27 / 23 / .540 / 6.0 / 50; 9 / Charlotte Hornets / 26 / 24 / .520 / 7.0 / 50; 10 / Toronto Raptors / 23 / 27 / .460 / 10.0 / 50; 11 / Cleveland Cavaliers / 22 / 28 / .440 / 11.0 / 50; 12 / Boston Celtics / 19 / 31 / .380 / 14.0 / 50; 13 / Washington Wizards / 18 / 32 / .360 / 15.0 / 50; 14 / New Jersey Nets / 16 / 34 / .320 / 17.0 / 50; 15 / Chicago Bulls / 13 / 37 / .260 / 20.0 / 50; 8th seed in the East, 14th best league record
Defeated the (8) Minnesota Timberwolves, 3–1	First round	Defeated the (1) Miami Heat, 3–2
Defeated the (4) Los Angeles Lakers, 4–0	Conference semifinals	Defeated the (4) Atlanta Hawks, 4–0
Defeated the (2) Portland Trail Blazers, 4–0	Conference finals	Defeated the (2) Indiana Pacers, 4–2

=== Regular season series ===
The Spurs and Knicks did not play each other in the regular season.

== 1999 NBA Finals team rosters ==
=== San Antonio Spurs ===
1998–99 San Antonio Spurs roster
Players

Pos.	No.	Player	Height	Weight	DOB	From
PG	33	Antonio Daniels	6 ft 4 in (1.93 m)	205 lb (93 kg)	1975–03–19	Bowling Green
PF	21	Tim Duncan	6 ft 11 in (2.11 m)	250 lb (113 kg)	1976–04–25	Wake Forest
SG	17	Mario Elie	6 ft 5 in (1.96 m)	210 lb (95 kg)	1963–11–26	American International
SF	32	Sean Elliott	6 ft 8 in (2.03 m)	205 lb (93 kg)	1968–02–02	Arizona
SG	10	Andrew Gaze	6 ft 7 in (2.01 m)	205 lb (93 kg)	1965–07–24	Seton Hall
SG	2	Jaren Jackson	6 ft 4 in (1.93 m)	190 lb (86 kg)	1967–10–27	Georgetown
PG	6	Avery Johnson	5 ft 10 in (1.78 m)	175 lb (79 kg)	1965–03–25	Southern
PG	4	Steve Kerr	6 ft 3 in (1.91 m)	175 lb (79 kg)	1965–09–29	Arizona
SF	25	Jerome Kersey	6 ft 7 in (2.01 m)	215 lb (98 kg)	1962–06–26	Longwood
SF	54	Gerard King	6 ft 9 in (2.06 m)	230 lb (104 kg)	1972–11–25	Nicholls State
C	41	Will Perdue	7 ft 0 in (2.13 m)	240 lb (109 kg)	1965–08–29	Vanderbilt
C	50	David Robinson	7 ft 1 in (2.16 m)	235 lb (107 kg)	1965–08–06	Navy
PF	31	Malik Rose	6 ft 7 in (2.01 m)	250 lb (113 kg)	1974–11–23	Drexel
SG	11	Brandon Williams	6 ft 6 in (1.98 m)	215 lb (98 kg)	1975–02–27	Davidson

Coaches
Head coach
- Gregg Popovich
Assistant(s)
- Mike Budenholzer
- Hank Egan
- Paul Pressey

Legend
- (DP) Unsigned draft pick
- (FA) Free agent
- (S) Suspended
- Injured

Roster

=== New York Knicks ===
1998–99 New York Knicks roster
Players

Pos.	No.	Player	Height	Weight	DOB	From
G	9	Rick Brunson	6 ft 4 in (1.93 m)	190 lb (86 kg)	1972–06–14	Temple
F/C	23	Marcus Camby	6 ft 11 in (2.11 m)	220 lb (100 kg)	1974–03–22	UMass
G	1	Chris Childs	6 ft 3 in (1.91 m)	195 lb (88 kg)	1970–11–20	Boise State
F	4	Ben Davis	6 ft 9 in (2.06 m)	240 lb (109 kg)	1972–12–26	Arizona
C	14	Chris Dudley	6 ft 11 in (2.11 m)	235 lb (107 kg)	1965–02–22	Yale
C	33	Patrick Ewing (injured)	7 ft 0 in (2.13 m)	240 lb (109 kg)	1962–08–05	Georgetown
G	20	Allan Houston	6 ft 6 in (1.98 m)	220 lb (100 kg)	1971–04–20	Tennessee
F	2	Larry Johnson	6 ft 6 in (1.98 m)	250 lb (113 kg)	1969–03–14	UNLV
G/F	8	Latrell Sprewell	6 ft 5 in (1.96 m)	190 lb (86 kg)	1970–09–08	Alabama
F	40	Kurt Thomas	6 ft 9 in (2.06 m)	230 lb (104 kg)	1972–10–04	TCU
G	21	Charlie Ward	6 ft 2 in (1.88 m)	190 lb (86 kg)	1970–10–12	Florida State
F/C	32	Herb Williams	6 ft 10 in (2.08 m)	242 lb (110 kg)	1958–02–16	Ohio State
G/F	25	David Wingate	6 ft 5 in (1.96 m)	190 lb (86 kg)	1963–12–15	Georgetown

Coaches
Head coach
- Jeff Van Gundy
Assistant(s)
- Greg Brittenham
- Don Chaney
- Brendan Malone
- Jeff Nix
- Tom Thibodeau

Legend
- (DP) Unsigned draft pick
- (FA) Free agent
- (S) Suspended
- Injured

Roster

== Series summary ==
Game	Date	Road team	Result	Home team
Game 1	June 16	New York Knicks	77–89 (0–1)	San Antonio Spurs
Game 2	June 18	New York Knicks	67–80 (0–2)	San Antonio Spurs
Game 3	June 21	San Antonio Spurs	81–89 (2–1)	New York Knicks
Game 4	June 23	San Antonio Spurs	96–89 (3–1)	New York Knicks
Game 5	June 25	San Antonio Spurs	78–77 (4–1)	New York Knicks

The Finals were played using a 2–3–2 site format, where the first two and last two games are held at the team with home court advantage. The NBA, after experimenting in the early years, restored this original format for the Finals between 1985 and 2013. In 2014, the Finals returned to a 2–2–1–1–1 site format.

=== Game 1 ===
NBC

June 16

Boxscores

New York Knicks 77, San Antonio Spurs 89
Scoring by quarter: 27–21, 10–24, 26–26, 14–18
Pts: Sprewell, Houston 19; Rebs: Latrell Sprewell 7 Asts: Houston, Ward 3	Pts: Tim Duncan 33; Rebs: Tim Duncan 13; Asts: Avery Johnson 8
San Antonio leads the series, 1–0

Alamodome, San Antonio, Texas
Attendance: 39,514
Referees:
- Hugh Evans
- Steve Javie
- Bennett Salvatore

=== Game 2 ===
NBC

June 18

Boxscores

New York Knicks 67, San Antonio Spurs 80
Scoring by quarter: 15–20, 19–19, 15–17, 18–24
Pts: Latrell Sprewell 26; Rebs: Latrell Sprewell 7 Asts: Charlie Ward 3	Pts: Tim Duncan 25; Rebs: Tim Duncan 15; Asts: Avery Johnson 5
San Antonio leads the series, 2–0

Alamodome, San Antonio, Texas
Attendance: 39,554
Referees:
- Dan Crawford
- Joe Crawford
- Jess Kersey

=== Game 3 ===
NBC

June 21

Boxscores

San Antonio Spurs 81, New York Knicks 89
Scoring by quarter: 21–32, 25–17, 16–16, 19–24
Pts: David Robinson 25; Rebs: Tim Duncan 12; Asts: Avery Johnson 4	Pts: Allan Houston 34; Rebs: Houston, Johnson 5 Asts: Latrell Sprewell 5
San Antonio leads the series, 2–1

Madison Square Garden, New York City, New York
Attendance: 19,763
Referees:
- Dick Bavetta
- Hue Hollins
- Ronnie Nunn

This was the end of the Spurs' 12-game playoff winning streak, the longest in NBA history at the time.

=== Game 4 ===
NBC

June 23

Boxscores

San Antonio Spurs 96, New York Knicks 89
Scoring by quarter: 27–29, 23–17, 22–17, 24–26
Pts: Tim Duncan 28; Rebs: Tim Duncan 18; Asts: Avery Johnson 10	Pts: Latrell Sprewell 26; Rebs: Marcus Camby 13; Asts: Charlie Ward 8
San Antonio leads the series, 3–1

Madison Square Garden, New York City, New York
Attendance: 19,763
Referees:
- Hugh Evans
- Ron Garretson
- Mike Mathis

=== Game 5 ===
NBC

June 25

Boxscores

San Antonio Spurs 78, New York Knicks 77
Scoring by quarter: 20–23, 20–15, 19–20, 19–19
Pts: Tim Duncan 31; Rebs: David Robinson 12; Asts: Avery Johnson 9	Pts: Latrell Sprewell 35; Rebs: Latrell Sprewell 10; Asts: Allan Houston 5
San Antonio wins the NBA Finals, 4–1

Madison Square Garden, New York City, New York
Attendance: 19,763
Referees:
- Joe Crawford
- Steve Javie
- Bennett Salvatore

Avery Johnson hit the game-winner with 66 seconds remaining as the Knicks could not respond in time.

== Result ==
During the Finals, Larry Johnson received criticism when he characterized the Knicks as a band of "rebellious slaves". Bill Walton later called Johnson and his performance a "disgrace". When Johnson was asked about the play of San Antonio Spurs point guard Avery Johnson in Game 4, Johnson again shifted the topic to slavery: "Ave, man, we're from the same plantation. You tell Bill Walton that. We from Massa Johnson's plantation." Johnson added, "The NBA is full of black players, and people say, ‘Look, they have great opportunities, they've made incredible strides.' But when I go back to my neighborhood, I see the same thing. I'm the only one who came out of my neighborhood. Everybody I knew is either dead, on drugs, in jail, or selling drugs." This led to a war of words in the media when Walton stated Johnson spent "too much time railing against humanity and practicing his posing rather than developing his game". Johnson answered back by telling Walton to “trace his history and see how many slaves his ancestors had". Johnson was ultimately fined for his "rebellious slaves" comment.

The Spurs won the NBA Finals 4 games to 1. Spurs forward Tim Duncan was named the Most Valuable Player of the finals. On June 25 (two years to the day that Duncan was drafted by the Spurs), with 47 seconds to go in Game 5, Avery Johnson hit the game-winner. The Knicks scored 39 points in the second half, and Latrell Sprewell scored 25 of them, with fourteen of his points coming in the fourth quarter. However, he could not hit either of his jump shots in the last half-minute of the game that could have affected the outcome. Tim Duncan scored 31 points and nine rebounds in the decisive Game 5 while averaging 27.4 points and fourteen rebounds with 2.4 assists and 2.2 blocks in the Finals.

== Player statistics ==
Legend
GP	Games played	GS	Games started	MPG	Minutes per game
FG%	Field-goal percentage	3P%	3-point field-goal percentage	FT%	Free-throw percentage
RPG	Rebounds per game	APG	Assists per game	SPG	Steals per game
BPG	Blocks per game	PPG	Points per game

San Antonio Spurs

San Antonio Spurs statistics
Player	GP	GS	MPG	FG%	3P%	FT%	RPG	APG	SPG	BPG	PPG
Antonio Daniels	4	0	6.0	.800	1.000	.000	0.5	1.0	0.3	0.0	2.5
Tim Duncan	5	5	45.8	.537	.000	.795	14.0	2.4	1.0	2.2	27.4
Mario Elie	5	5	35.0	.447	.308	.870	4.0	2.6	1.2	0.0	11.6
Sean Elliott	5	5	36.2	.333	.278	.636	3.0	3.0	0.8	0.2	8.0
Jaren Jackson	5	0	19.2	.324	.375	.000	1.4	1.0	1.0	0.0	6.6
Avery Johnson	5	5	39.2	.500	.000	.600	2.6	7.2	0.6	0.0	9.2
Steve Kerr	5	0	8.8	.400	.500	.000	1.0	0.4	0.0	0.0	1.8
Jerome Kersey	2	0	2.0	1.000	.000	.000	0.0	0.0	0.0	0.0	1.0
Gerard King	2	0	1.0	.000	.000	.000	0.0	0.0	0.0	0.0	0.0
David Robinson	5	5	37.0	.424	.000	.688	11.8	2.4	1.0	3.0	16.6
Malik Rose	5	0	12.8	.200	.000	.500	2.4	0.4	0.6	0.4	1.2

New York Knicks

New York Knicks statistics
Player	GP	GS	MPG	FG%	3P%	FT%	RPG	APG	SPG	BPG	PPG
Rick Brunson	1	0	1.0	.001	.000	.000	0.0	0.0	0.0	0.0	0.0
Marcus Camby	5	3	27.0	.500	.000	.750	7.8	0.2	0.6	2.0	9.6
Chris Childs	5	0	21.0	.227	.200	.500	1.2	2.2	0.4	0.0	2.4
Chris Dudley	5	2	15.6	.250	.000	.333	3.8	0.2	0.2	0.6	1.2
Allan Houston	5	5	44.4	.427	.167	.923	3.2	3.4	0.4	0.0	21.6
Larry Johnson	5	5	37.0	.286	.111	.615	4.8	1.4	1.2	0.2	7.6
Latrell Sprewell	5	5	44.2	.410	.286	.842	6.6	2.6	1.4	0.2	26.0
Kurt Thomas	5	0	21.0	.344	.000	.600	7.6	0.4	1.2	0.0	5.6
Charlie Ward	5	5	29.0	.462	.333	.500	3.2	3.6	2.6	0.4	5.8
Herb Williams	2	0	1.5	.000	.000	.000	0.0	0.0	0.0	0.0	0.0

== Broadcasting ==
The 1999 NBA Finals was aired in the United States on NBC (including WNBC in New York City and KMOL-TV in San Antonio), with Bob Costas and Doug Collins on play-by-play and color commentary respectively. Hannah Storm served as the studio host while Isiah Thomas, Bill Walton and Peter Vecsey served as studio analysts. Ahmad Rashad and Jim Gray served as sideline reporters.

Locally, the Finals also marked the comeback of Marv Albert following his infamous sex scandal two years prior. Albert served as the Knicks' radio play-by-play announcer on WFAN with long-time partner John Andariese. NBC Sports rehired Albert shortly after and he eventually returned to the lead play-by-play role in 2000.

== Aftermath ==
In 2000, the Spurs became the first NBA champion since the 1985–86 Celtics to fail to win a second consecutive title. However, the Spurs eventually went on to become the most consistent team over the next two decades and won additional NBA titles in 2003, 2005, 2007 and 2014, all of which also featured Tim Duncan.

Game 2 at the Alamodome was the last NBA Finals game to take place at what is known as a multi-purpose stadium. Due to this fact, the 39,554 in attendance for the game will likely never be topped again, as the Chicago Bulls' United Center is the largest NBA arena by capacity with 20,917 seats.

The following season, the Knicks won 50 games but fell to the Indiana Pacers in six games in the Eastern Conference finals rematch. After that season, the Patrick Ewing era came to an end when he was traded to the Seattle SuperSonics.

The next eighth seed to make the NBA Finals was the Miami Heat in 2023. The result was the same, with the Heat losing to the Denver Nuggets in five games.

Both the Spurs and the Knicks would meet again 27 years later in the championship game of the 2025 NBA Cup, where the Knicks defeated the Spurs, 124–113. The Knicks did not return to the NBA Finals until 2026, coincidentally a rematch with the Spurs. The star player on the 2026 Knicks team was Jalen Brunson, the son of 1999 reserve guard Rick Brunson. The Knicks would win the 2026 match-up between the two teams in five games, winning their first title since 1973 and becoming the first team to win both the NBA Cup and NBA Championship in the same season. The series was an exact reversal of the 1999 series with the Knicks winning the first two in San Antonio, the Spurs winning game three in New York, and the Knicks winning games 4 and 5, clinching the title on the road like the Spurs did at Madison Square Garden 27 years prior.

== See also ==
- 1999 NBA playoffs
