= Mario Elie =

American basketball player and coach (born 1963)

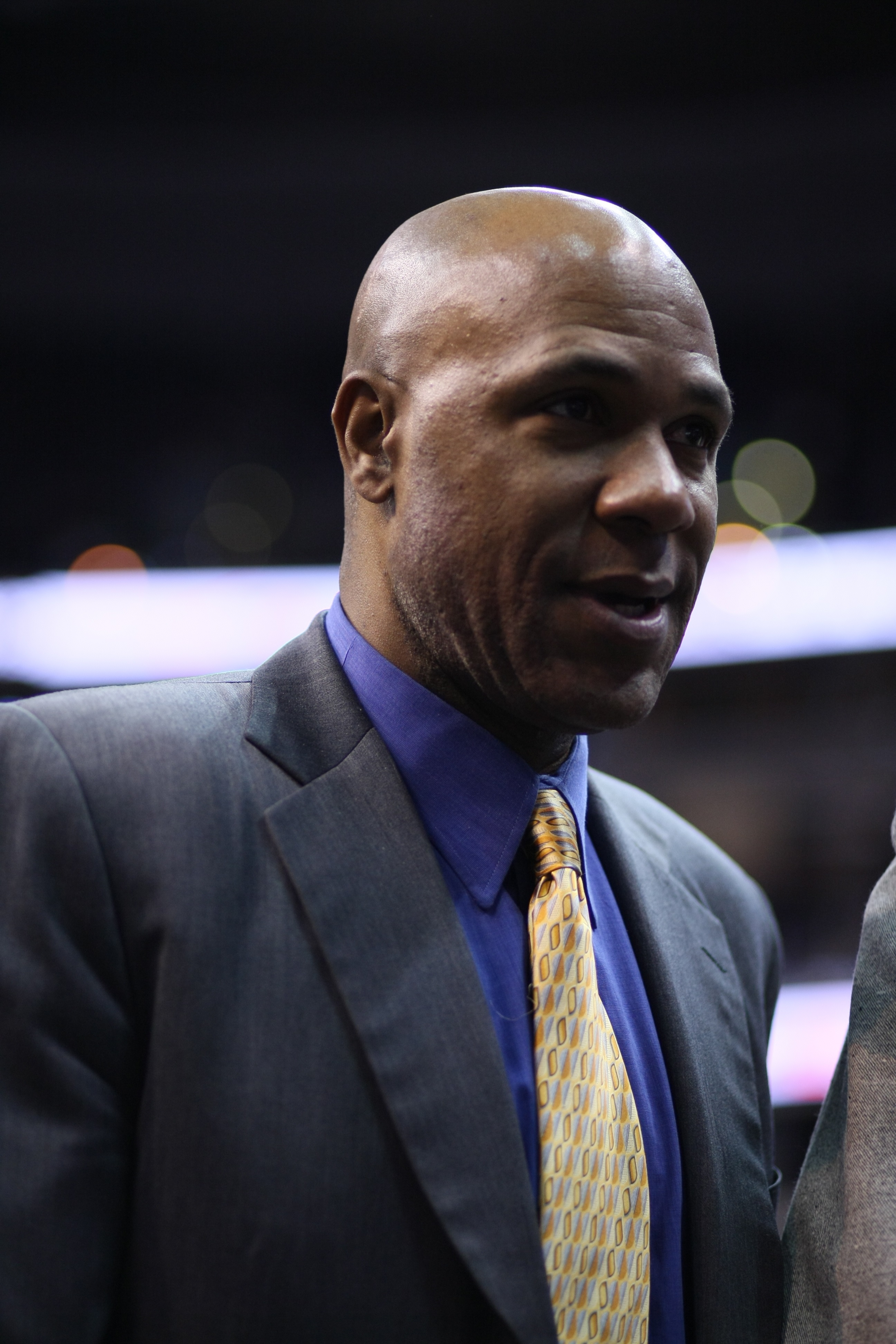
- Elie in 2008

Personal information
- Born: November 26, 1963 (age 62) Manhattan, New York, U.S.
- Listed height: 6 ft 5 in (1.96 m)
- Listed weight: 225 lb (102 kg)

Career information
- High school: Power Memorial (Manhattan, New York)
- College: American International (1981–1985)
- NBA draft: 1985: 7th round, 160th overall pick
- Drafted by: Milwaukee Bucks
- Playing career: 1986–2001
- Position: Shooting guard / small forward
- Number: 8, 20, 17
- Coaching career: 2003–2016

Career history

Playing
- 1986–1987: Killester
- 1987: Miami Tropics
- 1987: Unión de Santa Fe
- 1987–1989: Ovarense
- 1989: Youngstown Pride
- 1989–1991: Albany Patroons
- 1990–1991: Philadelphia 76ers
- 1991–1992: Golden State Warriors
- 1992–1993: Portland Trail Blazers
- 1993–1998: Houston Rockets
- 1999–2000: San Antonio Spurs
- 2000–2001: Phoenix Suns

Career highlights
- 3× NBA champion (1994, 1995, 1999); Irish National Cup champion (1987); Irish League Player of the Year (1987); Portuguese League champion (1988); Portuguese Super Cup winner (1988); Portuguese Cup winner (1989); CBA All-Star (1990); All-CBA First Team (1991)

Career NBA statistics
- Points: 6,265 (8.6 ppg)
- Rebounds: 2,017 (2.8 rpg)
- Assists: 1,875 (2.6 apg)
- Stats at NBA.com
- Stats at Basketball Reference

Mario Antoine Elie (born November 26, 1963) is an American former professional basketball coach and player in the National Basketball Association (NBA). Elie grew up in New York City and played college basketball for the American International Yellow Jackets men's basketball, before being selected in the seventh round of the 1985 NBA draft with the 160th overall pick by the Milwaukee Bucks.

Elie began his professional basketball career with Ireland's Killester in 1986. He went on to play in Portugal and Argentina, as well as in the USBL, CBA and WBL. Elie first played in the NBA in 1990 for the Philadelphia 76ers and went on to play for the Golden State Warriors, Portland Trail Blazers, Houston Rockets, San Antonio Spurs and Phoenix Suns. A role player known for his defense and toughness, Elie won three NBA championships: two with the Rockets in 1994 and 1995, and one with the Spurs in 1999.

Elie began his coaching career in 2003 as an assistant with the Spurs, and later held similar positions with the Dallas Mavericks, Sacramento Kings, New Jersey/Brooklyn Nets, and Orlando Magic.

== Early life ==
Elie, who is of Haitian heritage, was born and raised in the Manhattan borough of New York City. He was named "Mario" for opera singer Mario Lanza.

Elie attended Power Memorial Academy. After being cut from the freshman basketball team, Elie made the junior varsity team the following season; one of his teammates was future NBA star Chris Mullin.

== Early career ==
After Division I schools failed to recruit him, Elie played college basketball at the Division II level for American International College in Springfield, Massachusetts. He led AIC to the NCAA Division II Tournament Quarter-Final and became the school's all-time leading scorer. He was selected with the 160th pick (out of 162 total) in the 1985 NBA draft by the Milwaukee Bucks, but was cut from the team during training camp.

In 1986, Elie started his professional career in Ireland with Killester, where he won Player of the Year honors. Elie played for the USBL's Miami Tropics, Elie played eight games in Argentina with Unión de Santa Fe. He then spent two seasons in Portugal with Ovarense, helping them win their first national title. He spent two seasons with the Albany Patroons of the Continental Basketball Association (CBA) from 1989 to 1991, earning All-CBA First Team honors in 1991.

== NBA career ==
In December 1990, he made his NBA debut, joining the Philadelphia 76ers on a 10-day contract. He played three games for the 76ers between December 28 and January 2. In February 1991, he joined the Golden State Warriors, where he remained for the rest of the 1990–91 season as well as the 1991–92 season. Elie spent the 1992–93 season with the Portland Trail Blazers before being traded to the Houston Rockets prior to the 1993–94 season.

Elie won two NBA championships with the Rockets, in 1994 and 1995. During this period, Elie was dubbed the "Junkyard Dog" by his teammates. One highlight of Elie's career came when he hit a game-winning three-pointer in Game 7 of the 1995 Western Conference Semifinals against the Phoenix Suns to break a tie with 7.1 seconds. The shot is called the "Kiss of Death" by Rockets fans, as Elie made a taunting kissing gesture towards the Suns' bench after the shot. While Elie was a key role player for the Rockets off the bench throughout the regular season and the playoffs, he became a starter in the 1995 NBA Finals. This move paid off for the Rockets, as Elie averaged 16.3 points per game in the Finals while shooting 65% from the field.

Elie played for the Rockets through the 1997–98 season and then signed with the San Antonio Spurs, where he played for two seasons. The Spurs reportedly signed Elie in an effort to add "nastiness" to their team. Elie started for the Spurs for much of the season. With Elie, the Spurs won their first-ever NBA championship in 1999.

After playing the 2000–01 season for the Phoenix Suns, Elie retired. He finished his career with 6,265 points in 732 NBA games.

In 2007, Elie was inducted into the New York Basketball Hall of Fame. He has been named one of the top ten players in Houston Rockets history.

During his playing career, Elie was a role player who performed well in clutch situations. He had a reputation as a tough defender, a fierce competitor, and an accurate outside shooter.

== Coaching career ==
On September 28, 2007, Elie was hired by the Dallas Mavericks as an assistant coach. He served with the Mavericks for one season. On June 22, 2009, Paul Westphal hired Elie as an assistant coach for the Sacramento Kings. On December 8, 2011, Elie was added to former teammate Avery Johnson's coaching staff with the New Jersey Nets. On June 26, 2015, he was hired by the Orlando Magic as an assistant coach.

== Personal life ==
Elie is married to Gina Gaston, a journalist and anchorwoman for Houston's Channel ABC13. Elie and Gaston have triplets.

Elie speaks four languages: English and French from growing up in a Haitian-Creole household, Portuguese from playing pro basketball in Portugal, and Spanish from playing in Argentina.

In December 2010, Elie was arrested in Sacramento, California for allegedly driving while intoxicated.

== NBA career statistics ==
Legend
GP	Games played	GS	Games started	MPG	Minutes per game
FG%	Field goal percentage	3P%	3-point field goal percentage	FT%	Free throw percentage
RPG	Rebounds per game	APG	Assists per game	SPG	Steals per game
BPG	Blocks per game	PPG	Points per game	**Bold**	Career high
†	Won an NBA championship

=== Regular season ===
Year	Team	GP	GS	MPG	FG%	3P%	FT%	RPG	APG	SPG	BPG	PPG
1990–91	Philadelphia	3	0	6.7	.286	**.500**	.500	0.3	0.3	0.0	0.0	2.0
1990–91	Golden State	30	0	20.8	.507	.375	.500	**3.6**	1.5	0.6	**0.3**	7.7
1991–92	Golden State	79	32	21.2	**.521**	.329	.852	2.9	2.2	0.9	0.2	7.8
1992–93	Portland	**82**	7	21.4	.458	.349	.855	2.6	2.2	0.9	0.2	8.6
1993–94†	Houston	67	8	24.0	.446	.355	.860	2.7	3.1	0.7	0.1	9.3
1994–95†	Houston	81	13	23.4	.499	.398	.842	2.4	2.3	0.8	0.1	8.8
1995–96	Houston	45	16	30.8	.504	.323	.852	3.4	3.1	1.0	0.2	11.1
1996–97	Houston	78	77	**34.4**	.497	.420	**.896**	3.0	**4.0**	**1.2**	0.2	**11.7**
1997–98	Houston	73	59	27.2	.452	.291	.833	2.1	3.0	1.1	0.1	8.4
1998–99†	San Antonio	47	37	27.5	.471	.374	.866	2.9	1.9	1.0	**0.3**	9.7
1999–00	San Antonio	79	**79**	28.1	.427	.398	.846	3.2	2.4	0.9	0.1	7.5
2000–01	Phoenix	68	67	22.1	.423	.360	.797	2.3	1.9	0.9	0.2	4.4
Career		732	395	25.5	.473	.365	.854	2.8	2.6	0.9	0.2	8.6

=== Playoffs ===
Year	Team	GP	GS	MPG	FG%	3P%	FT%	RPG	APG	SPG	BPG	PPG
1991	Golden State	9	7	21.9	.500	**1.000**	.844	3.6	1.4	0.6	0.1	9.3
1992	Golden State	4	2	20.0	**.639**	**1.000**	.667	**5.5**	2.5	**1.3**	0.0	**12.5**
1993	Portland	4	0	13.0	.500	**1.000**	.889	1.5	1.0	0.5	0.3	5.0
1994†	Houston	**23**	0	16.6	.396	.313	.851	1.7	1.7	0.3	0.1	5.8
1995†	Houston	22	6	28.9	.504	.431	.795	2.8	2.5	1.0	0.0	9.1
1996	Houston	8	0	29.1	.439	.375	.917	2.8	1.8	0.9	**0.4**	9.8
1997	Houston	16	16	**37.4**	.466	.400	.839	3.5	**3.8**	0.9	0.3	11.5
1998	Houston	5	1	26.6	.444	.333	.667	2.6	1.2	0.4	0.0	6.6
1999†	San Antonio	17	**17**	30.9	.384	.267	.837	3.5	2.9	**1.3**	0.1	7.9
2000	San Antonio	4	4	28.8	.273	.143	**.944**	**4.3**	1.8	**1.3**	0.0	7.5
2001	Phoenix	4	4	25.8	.452	.154	.750	3.3	1.8	0.8	0.3	9.0
Career		116	57	26.3	.452	.367	.836	2.9	2.3	0.8	0.1	8.5
