= Gerard King =

American basketball player (born 1972)

Personal information
- Born: November 25, 1972 (age 53) New Orleans, Louisiana, U.S.
- Listed height: 6 ft 9 in (2.06 m)
- Listed weight: 230 lb (104 kg)

Career information
- High school: McDonogh (New Orleans, Louisiana)
- College: Nicholls (1990–1995)
- NBA draft: 1995: undrafted
- Playing career: 1995–2001
- Position: Small forward
- Number: 54, 51

Career history
- 1995: Miami Tropics
- 1995–1996: Quad City Thunder
- 1996–1998: Fontanafredda Siena
- 1999: San Antonio Spurs
- 1999–2001: Washington Wizards

Career highlights
- NBA champion (1999)
- Stats at NBA.com
- Stats at Basketball Reference
Medals
Representing United States
World Championships
Bronze medal – third place	1998 Greece	National team

Gerard King (born November 25, 1972) is an American former professional basketball player. He was a member of the San Antonio Spurs and the Washington Wizards in the National Basketball Association (NBA).

He played for the US national team in the 1998 FIBA World Championship, winning the bronze medal.

King attended and played college basketball for the Nicholls Colonels in Louisiana, and finished his career as the fourth leading scorer and sixth leading rebounder in school history. He was inducted into the Louisiana Basketball Hall of Fame in 2006.

He was a member of the San Antonio Spurs' 1999 NBA championship team. Then he played his two final NBA seasons (1999–2001) for the Washington Wizards. In 126 games, he averaged 4.5 points and 3.1 rebounds.
