= Avery Johnson =

American basketball player and coach (born 1965)

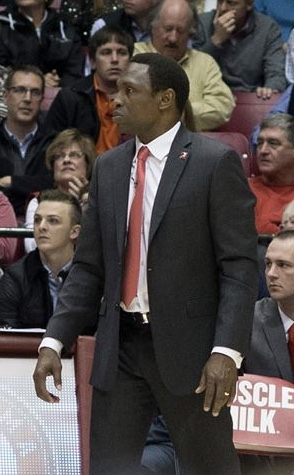
- Johnson coaching Alabama in 2016

Personal information
- Born: March 25, 1965 (age 61) New Orleans, Louisiana, U.S.
- Listed height: 5 ft 11 in (1.80 m)
- Listed weight: 185 lb (84 kg)

Career information
- High school: St. Augustine (New Orleans, Louisiana)
- College: New Mexico JC (1983–1984); Cameron (1984–1985); Southern (1986–1988)
- NBA draft: 1988: undrafted
- Playing career: 1988–2004
- Position: Point guard
- Number: 15, 6, 5
- Coaching career: 2004–2019

Career history

Playing
- 1988: Palm Beach Stingrays
- 1988–1990: Seattle SuperSonics
- 1990: Denver Nuggets
- 1991: San Antonio Spurs
- 1992: Houston Rockets
- 1992–1993: San Antonio Spurs
- 1993–1994: Golden State Warriors
- 1994–2001: San Antonio Spurs
- 2001–2002: Denver Nuggets
- 2002–2003: Dallas Mavericks
- 2003–2004: Golden State Warriors

Coaching
- 2004–2005: Dallas Mavericks (assistant)
- 2005–2008: Dallas Mavericks
- 2010–2012: New Jersey / Brooklyn Nets
- 2015–2019: Alabama

Career highlights
- As player: NBA champion (1999); No. 6 retired by San Antonio Spurs; 2× NCAA assists leader (1987, 1988); SWAC Player of the Year (1988); No. 15 retired by Southern Jaguars; As coach: NBA Coach of the Year (2006); NBA All-Star Game head coach (2006)

Career NBA statistics
- Points: 8,817 (8.4 ppg)
- Rebounds: 1,751 (1.7 rpg)
- Assists: 5,846 (5.5 apg)
- Stats at NBA.com
- Stats at Basketball Reference

Avery DeWitt Johnson (born March 25, 1965) is an American basketball television commentator, former player and coach who previously served as head coach of the Alabama Crimson Tide men's basketball team. He is an NBA and college basketball analyst for CBS Sports.

Johnson spent 16 years in the National Basketball Association as a player, and subsequently served as the head coach of two NBA teams: the Dallas Mavericks and New Jersey/Brooklyn Nets. He led the Mavericks to their first NBA Finals appearance and to three consecutive 50+ win seasons. During his playing days, Johnson was known as the "Little General" for his small stature (by NBA standards), his leadership skills as a point guard, and his close friendship with former San Antonio Spurs teammate David Robinson.

== Playing career ==
=== College ===
As a high school senior in 1983, Johnson led New Orleans' St. Augustine High School to a 35–0 record and the Class 4A Louisiana State Championship. Johnson matriculated to New Mexico Junior College before moving on to Cameron University, and finally Southern University, at which in his senior season in 1988 he led NCAA Division I with 13.3 assists per game, an all-time record as of 2007. In that season, he also averaged 11.4 points per game, making him the first men's Division I player ever to average double figures in points and assists in the same season—a feat that was not duplicated until Jason Brickman of LIU Brooklyn did so in 2013–14.

Upon graduation in 1988, Johnson was not selected in the NBA draft.

=== NCAA Records ===
- Most assist per game in a career: 12.0 (note: played 2 seasons)
- Most assists per games in a season : 13.3
  - (note: 399 total in 30 games as a senior which is most all time)
- Most assists in a Junior season: 333
- Most assist per game in a junior season: 10.74
- Most 20+ assists games in a career: 4
  - Accomplished in only 2 seasons, only 1 other player has 2 which was in 4 seasons
- Most 20+ assists in a season: 2
  - Twice in both Junior & Senior seasons

=== Professional ===
==== Palm Beach Stingrays (1988) ====
Johnson spent the summer of 1988 with the Palm Beach Stingrays of the United States Basketball League. Johnson also played in six playoff games for the Stingrays.

==== Various NBA teams (1988–1994) ====
After the Stingrays, Johnson signed with the Seattle SuperSonics for the 1988–89 season. In 43 games, Johnson averaged 1.6 points and 1.7 assists as a reserve. In the 1989–90 season, Johnson played 53 games with 10 starts for the Seattle SuperSonics. He made 18 assists on January 5, 1990, against the Miami Heat.

On October 24, 1990, the SuperSonics traded Johnson to the Denver Nuggets for a conditional pick in the 1997 NBA draft. After playing 21 games, Johnson was waived from the Nuggets in December before signing with the San Antonio Spurs on January 17, 1991. Johnson played 47 games with seven starts for the Spurs and averaged 9.4 points, 2.1 rebounds, and 5.4 assists.

In the beginning of the 1991–92 season, Johnson played 20 games and averaged 5.0 points and 6.8 assists for the Spurs before being waived in December. On January 10, 1992, Johnson signed the first of several 10-day contracts with the Houston Rockets that preceded a longer-term contract. Johnson scored a then-career-high 22 points against the Minnesota Timberwolves on January 28.

Signed as an unrestricted free agent, Johnson returned to the Spurs on November 19, 1992. Promoted to starter, Johnson averaged 8.7 points, 1.9 rebounds, and 7.5 assists and improved his field goal percentage to .502 in 75 games. In the playoffs, Johnson averaged 8.2 points and 8.1 assists.

Johnson signed with the Golden State Warriors on October 25, 1993, and was named team captain just nine days into his signing. Starting 70 of 82 games, Johnson reached a new career high 10.9 points per game along with 5.3 assists per game.

==== San Antonio Spurs (1994–2001) ====
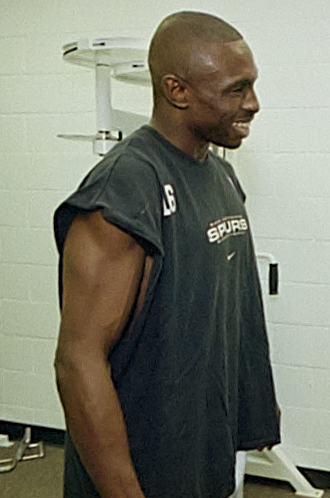
Johnson at the Alamodome in March 2000

Johnson was with the Spurs from 1994 to 2001, and played an integral role on the 1998–99 Spurs team that won the NBA championship against the New York Knicks. Johnson made the go-ahead, championship-clinching shot in Game 5 on a jumper with 47 seconds remaining in the game. The Spurs retired Johnson's number 6 on December 22, 2007. He was also inducted into the San Antonio Sports Hall of Fame on February 20, 2009.

==== After the Spurs ====
On July 19, 2001, Johnson signed as a free agent with the Denver Nuggets. Johnson played 51 games (13 starts) with the Nuggets and averaged 9.4 points, 1.3 rebounds, and 5.1 assists. The Nuggets traded Johnson, Nick Van Exel, Raef LaFrentz, and Tariq Abdul-Wahad to the Dallas Mavericks on February 21, 2002, for Donnell Harvey, Tim Hardaway, Juwan Howard, and draft considerations. Johnson played 17 games all as a reserve with the Mavericks for the rest of the season.

In the 2002–03 season, Johnson played in 48 games as a reserve for the Mavericks, averaging 9.0 minutes per game. During the 2003 offseason, the Mavericks traded Johnson, Van Exel, Popeye Jones, Antoine Rigaudeau, and Evan Eschmeyer to the Golden State Warriors for Antawn Jamison, Jiří Welsch, Chris Mills, and Danny Fortson. Johnson ended his NBA career in the 2003–04 season in his second stint with the Warriors. He played 46 games with one start and averaged 4.6 points, 0.7 rebounds, and 2.4 assists.

== Post-playing career ==
=== Dallas Mavericks ===
On October 28, 2004, Johnson retired from playing and signed as an assistant coach with the Dallas Mavericks under Don Nelson. Johnson had played under Nelson from 1993 to 1994 and from 2002 to 2003, and it was understood from the beginning that he was being groomed to eventually succeed Nelson as head coach. His transition from assistant to head coach came five months later on March 19, 2005, after Nelson resigned.

Under Johnson, the Mavericks closed out the 2004–05 season with a 16–2 run and a first-round playoff victory over the Houston Rockets, before being eliminated by the Phoenix Suns in the second round of the playoffs. Johnson was named the April 2005 NBA Coach of the Month, only one month after becoming a head coach for the first time.

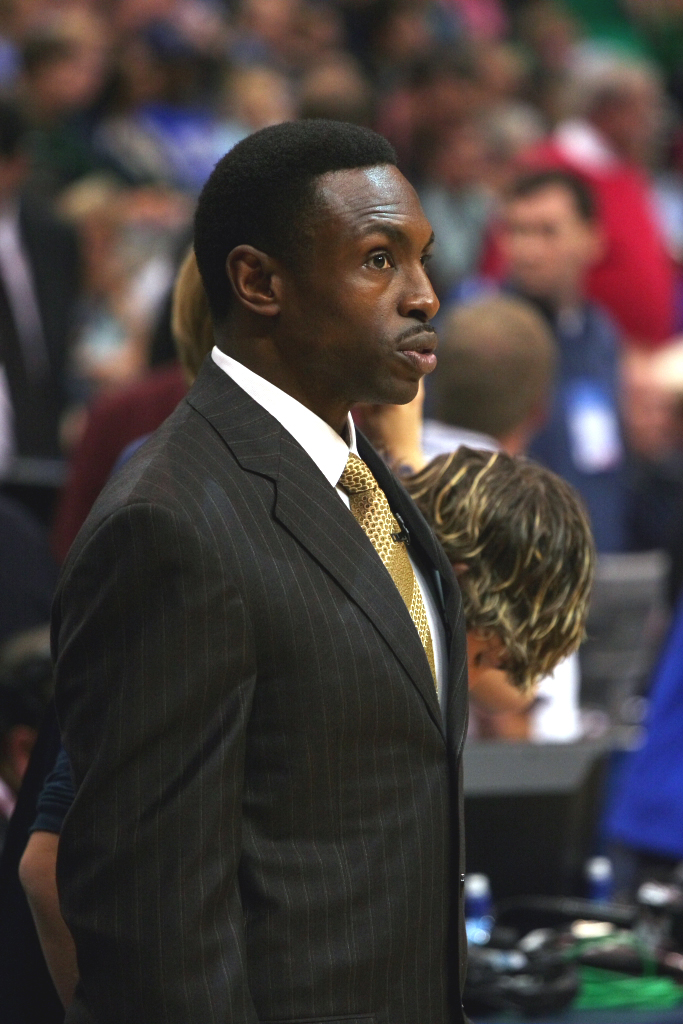
Johnson as the head coach of the Mavs, 2008

The 2005–06 season was even more successful for Johnson and was marked by a series of milestones. In November 2005, Johnson won his second NBA Coach of the Month award (which was also his second consecutive award, following the one he had won in April the previous season), making him the first NBA coach to win the award in his first two months as a head coach. On January 28, 2006, when the Dallas Mavericks defeated the Utah Jazz, Johnson's record as head coach improved to 50–12, making Johnson the fastest coach to reach 50 wins. In February 2006, he was chosen to coach the 2006 NBA All-Star team for the Western Conference. Although Johnson ultimately led the Mavericks to the second-best record in the Western Conference, the team entered the playoffs as the fourth seed in the West due to the structure of the 2006 NBA Playoffs seeding. In April 2006, Johnson was rewarded for his success throughout the season with the 2006 NBA Coach of the Year Award.

In June 2006, after defeating the Memphis Grizzlies, the defending champion San Antonio Spurs, and the Phoenix Suns in the first three rounds of the playoffs, Johnson led the Mavericks to their first ever NBA Finals appearance. However, the Mavs were defeated in six games by the Miami Heat, losing four straight after winning the first two games.

On December 31, 2006, Johnson became the fastest head coach (at the time) to win 100 games when his squad defeated the Denver Nuggets. This record was later broken by Tom Thibodeau and the Chicago Bulls. In the 2006–07 season, Johnson's Mavericks had the best record in the NBA with 67 wins and entered the playoffs as the top seed. However, his Mavericks lost to the eighth-seeded Golden State Warriors, led by former Mavericks head coach Don Nelson, in one of the biggest upsets in recent NBA history.

With the Mavs' win over the Grizzlies on November 18, 2007, Johnson became the fastest coach to reach 150 wins. Following the 2007–08 season, the Mavericks under Johnson were eliminated in the first round of the playoffs for the second year in a row. A day later, on April 30, 2008, Johnson was dismissed as head coach of the Mavericks and replaced by former NBA Coach of the Year, Rick Carlisle.

=== First stint at ESPN ===
On October 17, 2008, Johnson joined ESPN as a studio analyst. He remained in that role for two seasons, until he received an offer to become head coach of the New Jersey Nets.

=== New Jersey/Brooklyn Nets ===
On June 10, 2010, Johnson was hired as head coach of the New Jersey Nets, which had just finished a dismal 2009–10 campaign with a 12–70 record. In his first year as coach of the Nets, the team improved slightly, doubling its win total from the previous season and finishing 24–58. However, the next year saw no such improvement, as his team went 22–44 in the lockout-shortened season.

Johnson remained with the Nets when the team moved to Brooklyn in 2012. He was named the Eastern Conference Coach of the Month for October and November 2012 following an 11–4 start to the season. Despite that early success, the team went on to lose ten of its next 13 games, and subsequently Johnson was fired from his head coaching position on December 27, 2012.

=== Second stint at ESPN ===
In 2013, Johnson rejoined ESPN to appear as an analyst on SportsCenter, NBA Coast to Coast, and NBA Tonight.

=== Alabama ===
On April 5, 2015, ESPN reported that Johnson had verbally agreed to become the new head basketball coach at the University of Alabama, replacing Anthony Grant. The following day, the university officially announced Johnson's hiring as the school's 21st men's basketball coach. After losing in the first round of the 2019 National Invitation Tournament, Alabama and Johnson agreed to mutually part ways.

=== Avery Capital ===
In 2019, Avery returned to Dallas and began to focus on real estate. He partnered with John Bailey to form Allan Bailey Johnson. Combining his experience in private equity with John's expertise in the local real estate arena, Avery decided to expand his partnership with John to form Avery Capital in 2020.

== Personal life ==
Johnson and his wife Cassandra have two children, Avery Jr. and Christianne. Avery Jr. played for the Alabama basketball team, coached by his father. Johnson is a Christian. He had a very memorable cameo in the movie Eddie even being referred to by Whoopi Goldberg as "looking like a little roach".

== NBA career statistics ==
Legend
GP	Games played	GS	Games started	MPG	Minutes per game
FG%	Field goal percentage	3P%	3-point field goal percentage	FT%	Free throw percentage
RPG	Rebounds per game	APG	Assists per game	SPG	Steals per game
BPG	Blocks per game	PPG	Points per game	**Bold**	Career high
†	Won an NBA championship	*	Led the league

=== Regular season ===
Year	Team	GP	GS	MPG	FG%	3P%	FT%	RPG	APG	SPG	BPG	PPG
1988–89	Seattle	43	0	6.8	.349	.111	.563	.6	1.7	.5	.1	1.6
1989–90	Seattle	53	10	10.8	.387	.250	.725	.8	3.1	.5	.0	2.6
1990–91	Denver	21	4	10.3	.426	.000	.656	1.0	3.7	.7	.1	3.8
1990–91	San Antonio	47	10	15.8	.483	.200	.691	1.2	3.3	.7	.0	5.1
1991–92	San Antonio	20	14	23.3	.509	.200	.750	1.8	5.0	1.1	.2	6.8
1991–92	Houston	49	1	15.8	.464	**.300**	.609	.9	3.4	.8	.1	5.1
1992–93	San Antonio	75	49	27.1	.502	.000	**.791**	1.9	7.5	1.1	.2	8.7
1993–94	Golden State	**82**	70	28.4	.492	.000	.704	2.1	5.3	1.4	.1	10.9
1994–95	San Antonio	**82***	**82***	36.7	**.519**	.136	.685	**2.5**	8.2	1.4	.2	**13.4**
1995–96	San Antonio	**82**	**82***	**37.6**	.494	.194	.721	**2.5**	**9.6**	**1.5**	**.3**	13.1
1996–97	San Antonio	76	76	32.5	.477	.231	.690	1.9	6.8	1.3	.2	10.5
1997–98	San Antonio	75	73	35.7	.478	.154	.726	2.0	7.9	1.1	.2	10.2
1998–99†	San Antonio	50*	50*	33.4	.473	.083	.568	2.4	7.4	1.0	.2	9.7
1999–00	San Antonio	**82**	**82***	31.4	.473	.111	.735	1.9	6.0	.9	.2	11.2
2000–01	San Antonio	55	20	23.5	.447	.167	.683	1.5	4.3	.6	.1	5.6
2001–02	Denver	51	13	23.5	.486	.000	.747	1.3	5.1	.7	.2	9.4
2001–02	Dallas	17	0	8.9	.429	—	.706	.3	1.6	.3	.1	3.2
2002–03	Dallas	48	0	9.0	.420	.000	.769	.6	1.3	.3	.0	3.3
2003–04	Golden State	46	1	13.8	.402	.000	.667	.7	2.4	.6	.1	4.6
Career		1,054	637	25.3	.479	.145	.706	1.7	5.5	1.0	.1	8.4

=== Playoffs ===
Year	Team	GP	GS	MPG	FG%	3P%	FT%	RPG	APG	SPG	BPG	PPG
1989	Seattle	6	0	5.2	.417	.000	.500	.7	.8	.7	.0	1.8
1991	San Antonio	3	0	6.3	.000	.000	**1.000**	.0	1.3	.3	.0	.7
1993	San Antonio	10	10	31.4	.514	.000	.714	3.1	8.1	1.0	.1	8.2
1994	Golden State	3	0	13.7	.529	.000	—	1.0	3.3	1.3	.3	6.0
1995	San Antonio	15	15	38.3	.517	.000	.621	2.1	8.3	1.3	**.4**	14.5
1996	San Antonio	10	10	**40.7**	.430	.000	.704	**3.6**	**9.4**	**2.0**	.1	12.3
1998	San Antonio	9	9	38.0	**.604**	.000	.667	1.4	6.1	1.0	.0	**17.3**
1999†	San Antonio	**17**	**17**	38.4	.487	**.333**	.681	2.5	7.4	1.2	.1	12.6
2000	San Antonio	4	4	36.0	.452	—	.714	2.3	5.3	1.0	.0	12.0
2001	San Antonio	13	0	21.6	.386	.000	.533	1.2	3.2	.8	.1	5.8
Career		90	65	31.2	.486	.063	.661	2.1	6.2	1.1	.1	10.5

== Head coaching record ==
=== NBA ===
Legend
Regular season	G	Games coached	W	Games won	L	Games lost	W–L %	Win–loss %
Playoffs	PG	Playoff games	PW	Playoff wins	PL	Playoff losses	PW–L %	Playoff win–loss %

Team	Year	G	W	L	W–L%	Finish	PG	PW	PL	PW–L%	Result
Dallas	2004–05	18	16	2	.889	2nd in Southwest	13	6	7	.462	Lost in Conference semifinals
Dallas	2005–06	82	60	22	.732	2nd in Southwest	23	14	9	.609	Lost in NBA Finals
Dallas	2006–07	82	67	15	.817	1st in Southwest	6	2	4	.333	Lost in first round
Dallas	2007–08	82	51	31	.622	4th in Southwest	5	1	4	.200	Lost in first round
New Jersey	2010–11	82	24	58	.293	4th in Atlantic	—	—	—	—	Missed playoffs
New Jersey	2011–12	66	22	44	.333	5th in Atlantic	—	—	—	—	Missed playoffs
Brooklyn	2012–13	28	14	14	.500	(fired)	—	—	—	—	—
Career		440	254	186	.577		47	23	24	.489	

=== College ===
Record table
Season	Team	Overall	Conference	Standing	Postseason
Alabama Crimson Tide (Southeastern Conference) (2015–2019)
2015–16	Alabama	18–15	8–10	10th	NIT First Round
2016–17	Alabama	19–15	10–8	T–5th	NIT First Round
2017–18	Alabama	20–16	8–10	T–9th	NCAA Division I Round of 32
2018–19	Alabama	18–16	8–10	T–9th	NIT First Round
Alabama:		75–62 (.547)	34–38 (.472)		
Total:		75–62 (.547)			

== See also ==
- List of NBA career assists leaders
- List of NCAA Division I men's basketball players with 20 or more assists in a game
