= Crestview High School (Florida) =

Coordinates: 30.7896°N 86.5602°W

Crestview Senior High School

Location
- 1250 North Ferdon Blvd. Crestview, Okaloosa County, Florida 32536; United States

Information
- School type: Public
- Motto: "Pathway to Success"
- Established: 1969
- School board: Okaloosa District Schools
- School district: Okaloosa County School District
- Superintendent: Marcus Chambers
- Principal: Victoria Hayden
- Staff: 100.00 (FTE)
- Grades: 9–12
- Enrollment: 2,376 (2024-2025)
- Student to teacher ratio: 23.15
- Campus: Rural
- Colors: Red and White
- Mascot: Bulldog
- Team name: Bulldogs
- Rival: Niceville High School
- Yearbook: Crimson Crest
- Website: https://www2.okaloosaschools.com/o/crestview/

Crestview High School (CHS) is the only high school in the city of Crestview, Florida. It was founded in 1926, and was part of a racially segregated system, serving only white students until 1966, when the students from Carver-Hill, the school for African-Americans, were transferred there. It is the largest high school in the Okaloosa County School District, which serves all of Okaloosa County. The mascot of the school is the bulldog.

== Athletics ==
The boys' basketball team won a state title in 1985 and in 2019. The football team has one 3A state final appearance where they came up short against Rockledge ultimately being named the 2002 Florida State 3A Runner-up. The cheerleading squad won a state title in 2010.

== History of Crestview High School ==
The first school in Crestview was a two-story frame building. It opened in 1879 on Highway 85, where the cemetery is today. The family names of some of the students who attended this school are still familiar today, among them Lance Richbourg, the Ferdon brothers, Opal Clark, R.D. Bush, and Alice Hart. At that time, the students went to school only four months out of the year. They learned the three "R's" during school and battled hogs at lunchtime. Only white children were allowed to attend.

In 1916, the original school was destroyed in a fire. Okaloosa County had just been formed and had appointed its first Superintendent, W.G. Pryor. Until they had a new school, the students were taught in a room at a small church. The church stood were the Harris Building and the Church of Christ are today. In 1917, the school was replaced by a small building across from the courthouse. It had only five rooms and 70 students. At that time, there was only two people in the faculty - Carey Rice (who was a principal, teacher, and general handyman) and her assistant principal. This school had increasing enrollment until it was destroyed by fire in 1920. After that, the students then crammed into an old Baptist Tabernacle for classes.

For the next six years, the county consolidated its school system. The schools went from 64 one-room buildings to 14 larger institutions with varied equipment and curriculum. The first seniors graduated from Crestview in 1924. There were only three - Purl Adams, Julia Adams, and Alton Clary.

In 1926, there was another new Crestview School, this one located at U.S. Route 90 and State Road 85. In 1928, Crestview High School became an accredited institution. By 1937, Crestview High School contained 200 students from grades one to twelve. The population of Crestview had reached 3000. During World War II, Eglin Air Force Base was built. The money from the national defense effort helped Okaloosa County progress. Education facilities were expanded and re-built. In 1942, Northwood Elementary School was built and grades one through eight were moved there. Crestview High School housed ninth through twelfth grade.

In 1953, disaster struck again, in the form of another fire. It was only a few hours before the students were going to be released for Christmas break. So, another new school was built - what is now the former Richbourg Middle School. It had 23 classrooms, a library, an office, a gym, a clinic and a lunchroom. The school cost $519,000 to build. There were 22 teachers that taught the 520 students enrolled there.

In 1969, African-American students were allowed to attend alongside white students for the first time. As a result, the children from Carver-Hill high school were transferred to Crestview. In order to accommodate both black and white students at Crestview, a new school building was built at a cost of $1.6 million. This new campus is the present day school.

== Notable alumni ==
- Terry Taylor, class of 1982, former Major League Baseball player
- Tom Hammonds, class of 1985, former NBA player
- John Bale, class of 1992, Major League Baseball player
- Michele V. Manuel, class of 1997, U.S. Steel Dean in the Swanson School of Engineering at the University of Pittsburgh
- Blake Dean, class of 2006, college baseball coach
- Devin Voisin, class of 2019, college football player
- Jaden Voisin, class of 2019, college football player
