= Tom Hammonds =

American basketball player (born 1967)

Personal information
- Born: March 27, 1967 (age 59) Fort Walton Beach, Florida, U.S.
- Listed height: 6 ft 9 in (2.06 m)
- Listed weight: 215 lb (98 kg)

Career information
- High school: Crestview (Crestview, Florida)
- College: Georgia Tech (1985–1989)
- NBA draft: 1989: 1st round, 9th overall pick
- Drafted by: Washington Bullets
- Playing career: 1989–2001
- Position: Power forward
- Number: 12, 20, 21

Career history
- 1989–1992: Washington Bullets
- 1992–1993: Charlotte Hornets
- 1993–1997: Denver Nuggets
- 1997–2001: Minnesota Timberwolves

Career highlights
- Third-team All-American – NABC (1989); 2× First-team All-ACC (1988, 1989); ACC Rookie of the Year (1986); No. 20 retired by Georgia Tech Yellow Jackets; First-team Parade All-American (1985); McDonald's All-American (1985)

Career NBA statistics
- Points: 3,617 (5.3 ppg)
- Rebounds: 2,243 (3.3 rpg)
- Stats at NBA.com
- Stats at Basketball Reference
Medals
Men's basketball
Representing United States
FIBA World Championship
Gold medal – first place	1986 Spain	National team

Tom Edward Hammonds (born March 27, 1967) is an American former professional basketball player and National Hot Rod Association drag racer. He was born in Fort Walton Beach, Florida, and attended Crestview High School in Crestview, Florida.

Hammonds played college basketball for the Georgia Tech Yellow Jackets, earning Rookie of the Year honors in the Atlantic Coast Conference in 1986. After graduating in 1989, he was selected by the Washington Bullets in the first round (ninth overall) in the 1989 NBA draft. He played 12 NBA seasons for the Bullets, Denver Nuggets, Charlotte Hornets and Minnesota Timberwolves, averaging 5.3 points per game in his career. He scored a career-high 31 points for the Bullets against the New York Knicks, on January 29, 1992.

While enrolled at Georgia Tech, Hammonds played for the US national team in the 1986 FIBA World Championship, winning the gold medal.

While playing for the Nuggets, Hammonds became involved in drag racing. He qualified in the 1996 Mopar Parts Mile High Nationals, only to lose to Kurt Johnson. He owns his own NHRA team, racing in the NHRA's Pro Stock class since 1996.

Hammonds also opened a car dealership in Darlington, South Carolina.

== Career statistics ==
Legend
GP	Games played	GS	Games started	MPG	Minutes per game
FG%	Field goal percentage	3P%	3-point field goal percentage	FT%	Free throw percentage
RPG	Rebounds per game	APG	Assists per game	SPG	Steals per game
BPG	Blocks per game	PPG	Points per game	**Bold**	Career high

=== NBA ===
==== Regular season ====
Year	Team	GP	GS	MPG	FG%	3P%	FT%	RPG	APG	SPG	BPG	PPG
1989–90	Washington	61	8	13.2.	.437	.000	.643	2.8	.8	.2	.2	5.3
1990–91	Washington	70	7	14.6	.461	.000	.722	2.9	.6	.2	.1	5.2
1991–92	Washington	37	**19**	**26.6**	.488	.000	.610	**5.0**	**1.0**	**.6**	**.4**	**11.9**
1992–93	Charlotte	19	5	7.5	.422	–	.625	1.6	.4	.0	.2	2.3
1992–93	Denver	35	0	16.3	.489	.000	.611	2.7	.5	.5	.2	5.9
1993–94	Denver	74	2	11.9	.500	–	.683	2.7	.5	.3	.2	4.1
1994–95	Denver	70	5	13.7	**.535**	.000	.746	3.2	.5	.2	.2	5.9
1995–96	Denver	71	4	14.7	.474	–	**.765**	3.1	.3	.3	.2	4.8
1996–97	Denver	**81**	8	21.7	.480	.000	.721	**5.0**	.8	.2	.3	6.2
1997–98	Minnesota	57	2	20.0	.516	.000	.697	4.8	.6	.3	.3	6.1
1998–99	Minnesota	49	0	14.6	.458	–	.640	2.8	.4	.2	.1	4.3
1999–00	Minnesota	56	0	6.6	.433	–	.589	1.8	.2	.1	.1	2.1
2000–01	Minnesota	7	0	4.3	.300	–	.500	.6	.1	.0	.0	1.0
Career		687	60	15.2	.480	.000	.691	3.3	.6	.2	.2	5.3

==== Playoffs ====
Year	Team	GP	GS	MPG	FG%	3P%	FT%	RPG	APG	SPG	BPG	PPG
1994	Denver	**8**	0	6.1	.222	–	.833	1.6	.3	.0	.0	1.1
1995	Denver	3	0	14.7	**.643**	–	.333	2.3	.3	.0	**.7**	6.7
1998	Minnesota	5	**1**	**22.6**	.429	–	.750	**4.4**	**.4**	.0	.2	**7.2**
1999	Minnesota	4	0	4.5	–	–	**1.000**	.5	.0	.0	.0	1.0
2000	Minnesota	1	0	2.0	–	–	–	.0	.0	.0	.0	.0
Career		21	1	10.8	.451	–	.719	2.1	.2	.0	.1	3.3
