= George William Barrow =

American politician

George William Barrow (1895–1985) was an American politician. He was a state legislator in Florida who served in the Florida House of Representatives during the 1931 session, representing Okaloosa County. He was a Democrat.

Barrow served in World War One as part of the Medical Corps. In 1920, he was elected to the Okaloosa County Board of Public Instruction for a four-year term. A Methodist, he is memorialized with a portico in his church in Crestview.
