= Laurel Hill, Florida =

- City
- City of Laurel Hill
- Location in Okaloosa County and the state of Florida
- Coordinates: 30°57′44″N 86°27′31″W
- Country: United States
- State: Florida
- County: Okaloosa
- Settled by West Florida in Spanish Florida (Almirante): 1821
- Settled in the Florida Territory (Almirante): 1821–January 31, 1827
- Unincorporated in the State of Florida (Almirante): 1881–1895
- Platted (Laurel Hill): 1895
- Incorporated (City of Laurel Hill): 1905
- Reincorporated (City of Laurel Hill): June 2, 1953

Government
  - Type: Mayor-Council
  - Mayor: Robert "Robby" Adams
  - Councilors: Debra Adams, Shawn Cogan, Kristine Gaskin, Jacob Locke, and Amanda Rosen
  - City Clerk: Nita Miller
  - City Attorney: Jonathan Holloway

Area
  - Total: 4.27 sq mi (11.05 km^{2})
  - Land: 4.20 sq mi (10.89 km^{2})
  - Water: 0.062 sq mi (0.16 km^{2})
- Elevation: 256 ft (78 m)

Population (2020)
  - Total: 584
  - Density: 138.8/sq mi (53.61/km^{2})
- Time zone: UTC-6 (Central (CST))
  - Summer (DST): UTC-5 (CDT)
- ZIP code: 32567
- Area code: 850
- FIPS code: 12-39650
- GNIS feature ID: 2404890

Laurel Hill is a city in Okaloosa County, Florida, United States. It is part of the Crestview–Fort Walton Beach–Destin, Florida Metropolitan Statistical Area. The population was 584 at the 2020 US Census, up from 537 at the 2010 census.

== History ==
The area which is now Laurel Hill was one of the first post-American annexation of West Florida (specifically Spanish West Florida), English-speaking settlements in Florida. There had been settlements by English-speaking loyalists in during the American Revolution. Settlers were documented establishing a community, originally known as Almirante (which means "admiral" in Spanish), soon after Florida's acquisition of the Spanish Florida by the United States in 1821, becoming the Florida Territory. The Almirante community proceeded to open its own post office on January 31, 1827.

In the 1880s, railroad access to the Florida Panhandle in Northwest Florida opened up a booming lumber industry, with the Yellow River Railroad reaching the Almirante (Laurel Hill) area by 1892. In 1895, Almirante, then just a small logging and farming community, was platted and renamed Laurel Hill, the name purportedly inspired by a large laurel tree which grew in the center of the community. Growing rapidly, the community was officially incorporated as the City of Laurel Hill by the Florida Legislature in 1905.

Although in 1915, Laurel Hill was the largest community in newly created Okaloosa County, the town lost out becoming Okaloosa's county seat to the more centrally located town of Crestview. Laurel Hill's economic fortunes went into a decline after World War I, a waning intensified by the Florida land speculation collapse of the 1920s, which resulted in the closing of Laurel Hill's only bank. In order to install infrastructure improvements and to re-stimulate the community, Laurel Hill was officially reincorporated as a municipality on June 2, 1953.

Once served by the Louisville & Nashville Railroad, which purchased the Yellow River Railroad in 1906, the line was abandoned and lifted in the 1980s.

First held in 1992, the Laurel Hill Hobo Festival is an annual event scheduled for the first Saturday in October.

Historic churches in the city include South Ebenezer Baptist Church, Ebenezer Baptist Church, Laurel Hill Presbyterian Church, Laurel Hill First Baptist Church, and Mount Zion Baptist Church.

== Geography ==
According to the United States Census Bureau, the city has a total area of 3.1 square miles (8.0 km^{2}), all land. It is the northernmost incorporated city in the state of Florida.

== Climate ==
The climate in this area is characterized by hot, humid summers and generally mild winters. According to the Köppen climate classification, the City of Laurel Hill has a humid subtropical climate zone (Cfa).

== Demographics ==
Historical population
Census	Pop.	Note	%±
1910	316		—
1920	291		−7.9%
1930	302		3.8%
1940	350		15.9%
1950	327		−6.6%
1960	411		25.7%
1970	418		1.7%
1980	610		45.9%
1990	543		−11.0%
2000	549		1.1%
2010	537		−2.2%
2020	584		8.8%
U.S. Decennial Census

=== 2010 and 2020 census ===
Laurel Hill racial composition (Hispanics excluded from racial categories) (NH = Non-Hispanic)
Race	Pop 2010	Pop 2020	% 2010	% 2020
White (NH)	439	452	81.75%	77.40%
Black or African American (NH)	86	71	16.01%	12.16%
Native American or Alaska Native (NH)	0	4	0.00%	0.68%
Asian (NH)	4	3	0.74%	0.51%
Pacific Islander or Native Hawaiian (NH)	0	0	0.00%	0.00%
Some other race (NH)	1	5	0.19%	0.86%
Two or more races/Multiracial (NH)	4	37	0.74%	6.34%
Hispanic or Latino (any race)	3	12	0.56%	2.05%
Total	537	584		

As of the 2020 United States census, there were 584 people, 225 households, and 125 families residing in the city.

As of the 2010 United States census, there were 537 people, 204 households, and 178 families residing in the city.

=== 2000 census ===
As of the census of 2000, there were 549 people, 223 households, and 158 families residing in the city. The population density was 174.9 inhabitants per square mile (67.5/km^{2}). There were 254 housing units at an average density of 80.9 per square mile (31.2/km^{2}). The racial makeup of the city was 77.23% White, 21.68% African American, 0.18% Native American, 0.73% from other races, and 0.18% from two or more races. Hispanic or Latino of any race were 1.09% of the population.

In 2000, there were 223 households, out of which 30.9% had children under the age of 18 living with them, 49.8% were married couples living together, 17.0% had a female householder with no husband present, and 29.1% were non-families. 25.6% of all households were made up of individuals, and 11.7% had someone living alone who was 65 years of age or older. The average household size was 2.46 and the average family size was 2.93.

In 2000, in the city, the population was spread out, with 26.8% under the age of 18, 5.8% from 18 to 24, 27.7% from 25 to 44, 24.0% from 45 to 64, and 15.7% who were 65 years of age or older. The median age was 39 years. For every 100 females, there were 90.0 males. For every 100 females age 18 and over, there were 85.3 males.

In 2000, the median income for a household in the city was $25,385, and the median income for a family was $28,281. Males had a median income of $25,809 versus $17,500 for females. The per capita income for the city was $12,949. About 18.0% of families and 21.6% of the population were below the poverty line, including 25.2% of those under age 18 and 9.4% of those age 65 or over.

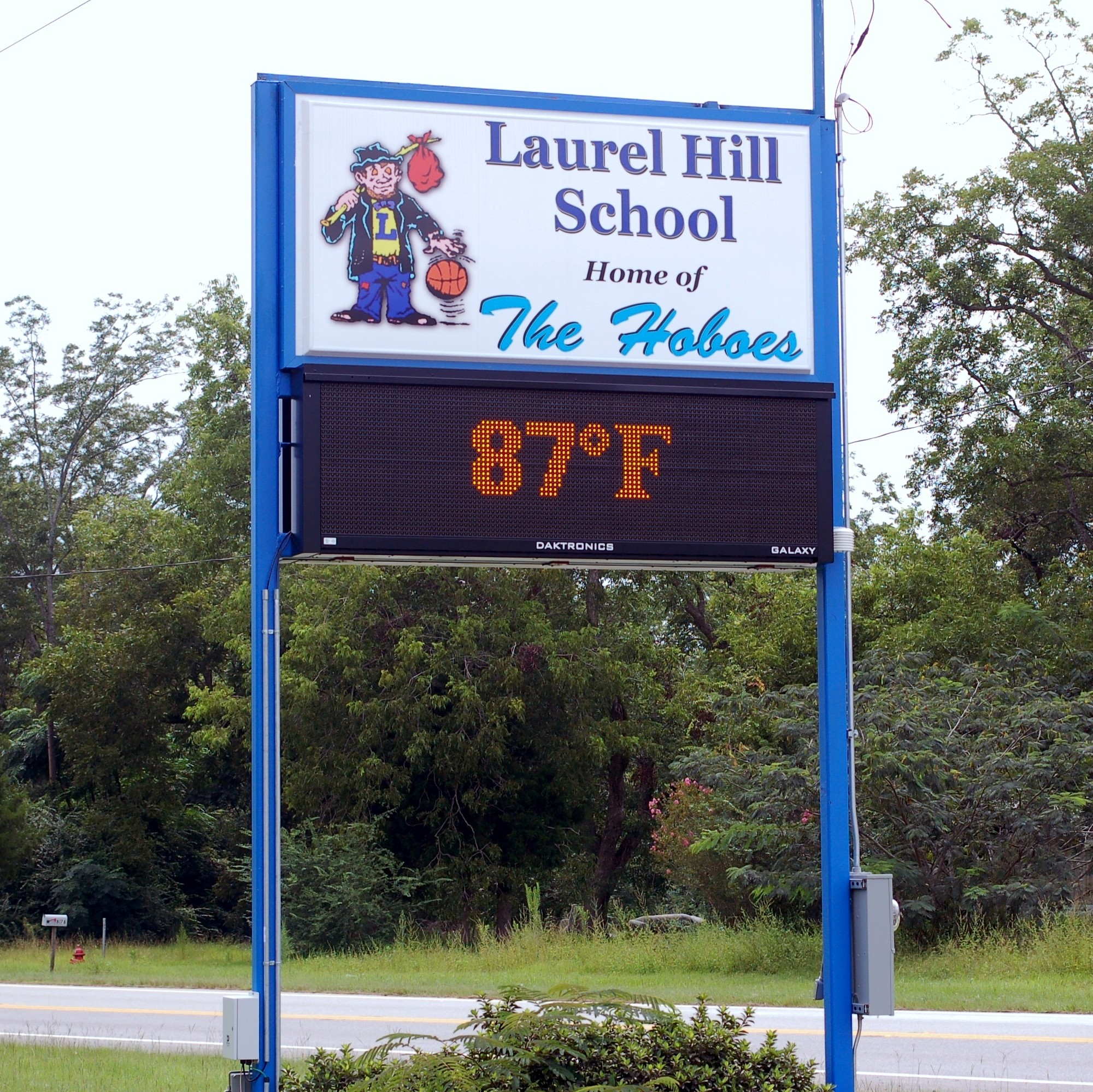
Laurel Hill School sign

== Education ==
All public schools located within the City of Laurel Hill are served by the Okaloosa County School District.

- Okaloosa Comprehensive Head Start
- Laurel Hill School The team name for the Laurel Hill School is the Hoboes, allegedly the only school in the US with this team name.
