= John Bale (baseball) =

American baseball player (born 1974)

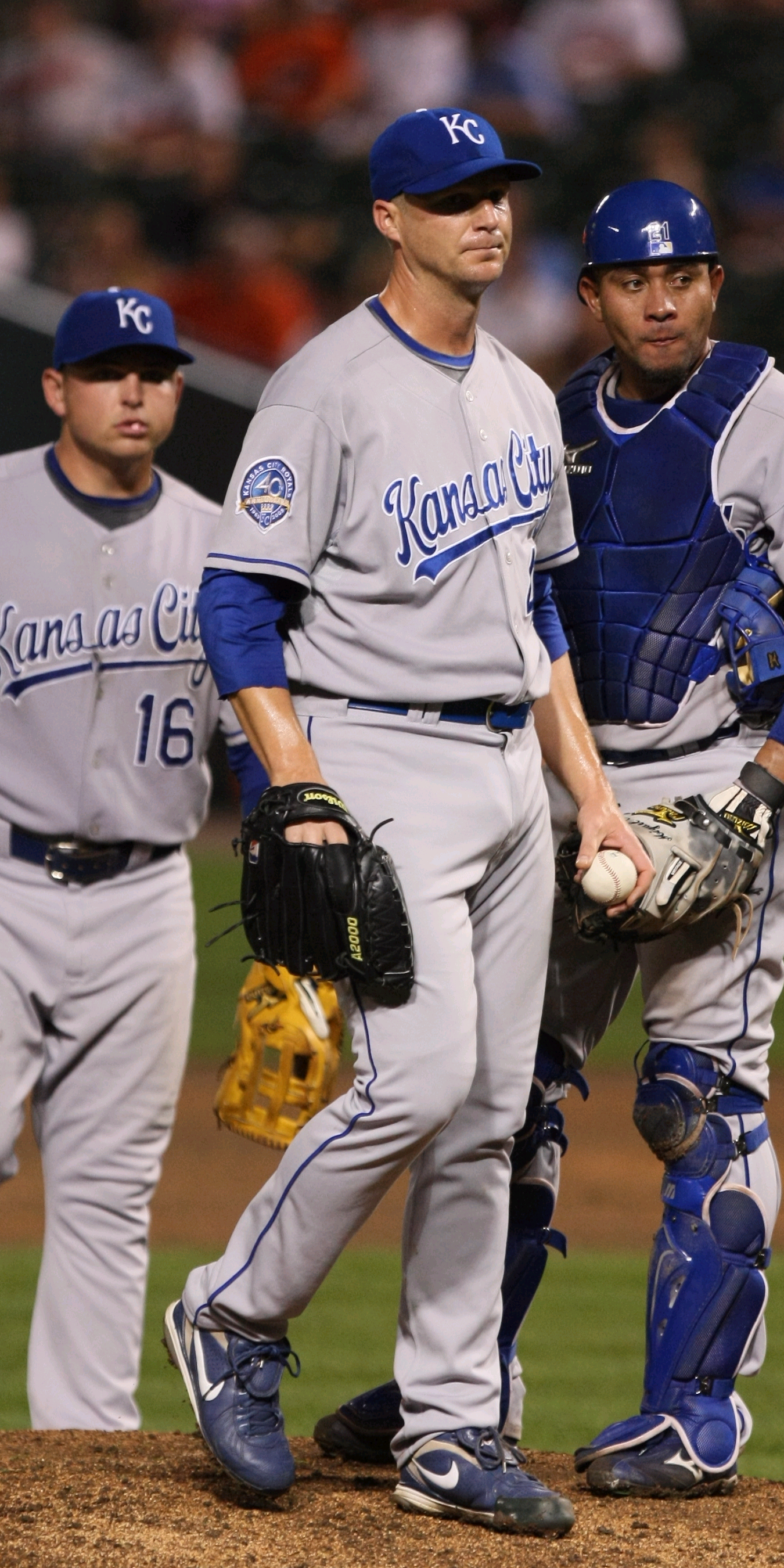
- Bale with the Kansas City Royals in 2009
- Pitcher
- Born: May 22, 1974 (age 52); Cheverly, Maryland, U.S.
- Batted: Left Threw: Left

Professional debut
- MLB: September 30, 1999, for the Toronto Blue Jays
- NPB: 2004, for the Hiroshima Toyo Carp

Last appearance
- MLB: October 2, 2009, for the Kansas City Royals
- NPB: September 18, 2010, for the Hiroshima Toyo Carp

MLB statistics
- Win–loss record: 3–7
- Earned run average: 4.66
- Strikeouts: 148

NPB statistics
- Win–loss record: 14–16
- Earned run average: 4.09
- Strikeouts: 312
- Stats at Baseball Reference

Teams
- Toronto Blue Jays (1999–2000); Baltimore Orioles (2001); Cincinnati Reds (2003); Hiroshima Toyo Carp (2004–2006); Kansas City Royals (2007–2009); Hiroshima Toyo Carp (2010)

John Robert Bale (born May 22, 1974) is a former Major League Baseball left-handed pitcher. He pitched in MLB for the Toronto Blue Jays, Baltimore Orioles, Cincinnati Reds, and Kansas City Royals.

Bale, a graduate of Crestview High School in Crestview, Florida, was an All-State selection in baseball his senior season after going 11–2 with a 0.38 ERA. He was inducted into the Crestview High School Sports Hall of Fame in 2012. Bale is also an alumnus of the University of Southern Mississippi, where he went 9–8 with a 4.01 ERA his junior year. He was selected by the St. Louis Cardinals in the 12th round of the 1994 Major League Baseball draft, but did not sign.

== Career ==
=== Toronto Blue Jays ===
Bale was selected again by the Toronto Blue Jays in the fifth round (129th overall) of the 1996 Major League Baseball draft. He made his professional debut that year with the Single-A St. Catharines Stompers, finishing 3–2 with a 4.86 earned run average (ERA) in eight starts. In 1997, Bale compiled a 7–7 record and a 4.30 ERA in 25 starts for the Single-A Hagerstown Suns.

Bale moved into a relief role with the Single-A Dunedin Blue Jays in 1998, going 4–4 with four saves and a 4.64 ERA in 24 games (nine starts). He also spent time with the Double-A Knoxville Smokies, recording a 6.75 ERA in three games.

In 1999, Bale spent the majority of the season in the minor leagues, posting a 2–5 record with one save and a 3.81 ERA in 39 games (eight starts) with Double-A Knoxville and the Triple-A Syracuse SkyChiefs. He made his Major League debut with the Blue Jays on September 30 against the Cleveland Indians, allowing three earned runs, two hits and two walks in two innings pitched.

Bale appeared in 21 games (12 starts) with Triple-A Syracuse in 2000, going 3–4 with a 3.19 ERA. He also appeared in two games with Toronto, recording an ERA of 14.73.

=== Baltimore Orioles and New York Mets organization ===
On December 11, 2000, Bale was traded from the Blue Jays to the Baltimore Orioles for outfielder Jayson Werth.

In 2001, his only season with the Orioles, Bale had a 1–0 record and a 3.04 ERA in 14 relief appearances.

Bale was designated for assignment by the Orioles on March 31, 2002. He was traded to the New York Mets for Gary Matthews, Jr. on April 3, 2002. For the season, Bale was assigned to the Triple-A Norfolk Tides, where he finished 2–2 with a 3.54 ERA in 12 games (two starts).

In 2003, Bale began the season with Norfolk, going 0–1 with a 3.29 ERA in eight games. He was released by the Mets on May 3.

=== Cincinnati Reds ===
On May 8, 2003, Bale signed as a free agent with the Cincinnati Reds. He made his first appearance with the team on August 3, allowing one earned run in two innings while walking one and striking out three in a 7–3 loss to the San Francisco Giants. After this game, he moved into the Reds' starting rotation for the remainder of the season. In his first major league start on August 8, Bale tossed 4 2/3 scoreless innings, allowing five hits and two walks in a no-decision. On August 13, he posted the best start of his career, tossing six shutout innings while allowing just three hits and striking out a career-high nine batters. Despite his efforts, Bale earned another no-decision in the 3–1 loss.

In 10 games (nine starts) with Cincinnati, Bale went 1–2 with a 4.47 ERA while striking out 37 batters in 46 1/3 innings. On December 10, 2003, Bale was placed on outright release waivers, and the Reds sold his contract to the Hiroshima Toyo Carp in Japan's Central League.

=== Hiroshima Toyo Carp ===
In 2004, the Carp used Bale exclusively as a starting pitcher. He finished the season with an 11–10 record and a 4.21 ERA in 25 starts. Bale was named the team's closer for 2005, and he went 2–1 with 24 saves and a 3.19 ERA in 51 relief appearances. In 2006, he served in a starting, middle relief, and closer role, going 1–2 with six saves and a 2.93 ERA in 30 games (five starts).

=== Kansas City Royals ===
On December 8, 2006, it was announced Bale would return to Major League Baseball, after signing a two-year contract with the Kansas City Royals.

Bale appeared in 26 games for Kansas City in 2007, all in relief. He had a 1–1 record with a 4.05 ERA, surrendering 45 hits in 40 innings.

Bale began the 2008 season in the Royals' starting rotation after a strong spring training. "Bale earned it," Royals manager Trey Hillman said to The Kansas City Star on March 25. "Johnny has been outstanding all through spring training. He's been hit in spots but, pretty much, from day one he's commanded three pitches." However, after going 0–3 with a 7.63 ERA in his first three starts, Bale was placed on the disabled list with left shoulder fatigue on April 17.

In one of the more bizarre instances in recent Royals history, Bale, while still on the disabled list due to his shoulder injury, broke his left (pitching) hand in May 2008 when he punched a hotel door. He later apologized for his actions and called it "a moment of frustration." After rehabbing in the Royals' minor league system, Bale was activated when rosters expanded on September 1. He was assigned to a bullpen role upon his return, and did not allow a run in his final 10 appearances. Overall, Bale was 0–3 with a 4.39 ERA in 13 games (three starts) with Kansas City in 2008. On December 16, 2008, Bale signed a one-year deal with the Royals for the 2009 season.

Bale recorded his first, and only career MLB save on June 24, 2009, pitching a perfect 11th inning against the Houston Astros. In 43 relief appearances with the Royals, he was 0–1 with one save and a 5.72 ERA. Bale was released by the Royals on December 10, 2009.

=== Hiroshima Toyo Carp (second stint) ===
On February 19, 2010, Bale signed a contract to return to the Hiroshima Toyo Carp of Nippon Professional Baseball. He became a free agent following the season.

=== Detroit Tigers ===
On December 1, 2010, Bale signed a minor league contract with the Detroit Tigers. He was released on March 25, 2011.

=== Camden Riversharks ===
On April 14, 2011, Bale signed with the Camden Riversharks of the Atlantic League of Professional Baseball. In 52 games (one start) with Camden, he went 1–2 with four saves and a 2.35 ERA, striking out 50 batters in 61 1/3 innings.

== Personal life ==
Bale and his wife, Genevieve, reside in Niceville, Florida, with their daughters, Madison and Olivia, and their son, Zachary. Genevieve's brother is NHL player Vincent Lecavalier.
