= Florida High School Athletic Association =

High school athletics organizer for the state of Florida

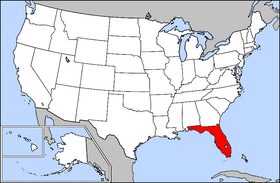
- Abbreviation: FHSAA
- Formation: April 9, 1920; 106 years ago
- Type: Nonprofit 501c(3)
- Legal status: Association
- Headquarters: 1801 NW 80th Blvd. Gainesville, FL 32606
- Region served: Florida
- Members: 813 schools
- Executive Director: Craig Damon
- Main organ: Board of Directors
- Affiliations: National Federation of State High School Associations
- Budget: $6,591,742 (2022-2023)
- Staff: 26
- Website: fhsaa.com

The Florida High School Athletic Association (FHSAA) is a not-for-profit organization designated by the Florida Legislature as the governing organization to regulate all interscholastic activities of high schools in the U.S. state of Florida. It is a member of the National Federation of State High School Associations (NFHS). Florida uses the contest rules set by the NFHS in its sports.

== History ==
The Florida High School Athletic Association was founded on April 9, 1920, by a group of 29 high school principals which met on the University of Florida campus in Gainesville. The organization was founded as the Florida High School Athletic Association. The name was changed to Florida High School Activities Association in 1951. The name was changed back to Florida High School Athletic Association in 2002. The Florida Interscholastic Athletic Association (FIAA) was created to provide competition by Black schools.

The 29 schools who became charter members were: Summerlin (Bartow), Clearwater, Mainland (Daytona Beach), Seabreeze (Daytona Beach), DeLand, Fort Lauderdale, Fort Myers, Gainesville, Duval (Jacksonville), Osceola (Kissimmee), Columbia (Lake City), Lakeland, Leesburg, Suwannee (Live Oak), Miami, Ocala, Orlando, Putnam (Palatka), Pensacola, Plant City, Quincy, Seminole (Sanford), Ketterlinus (St. Augustine), St. Petersburg, Leon (Tallahassee), Hillsborough (Tampa), Hardee (Wauchula), West Palm Beach, and Winter Haven.

The first Constitution limited membership to public schools. However, in 1930, it was amended to open membership to private and parochial schools as well.

In 1951, the member schools voted to change the word "athletic" to "activities" in the organization name so that non-athletic activities such as music and student council programs would also receive proper supervision at the state level.

The Association was incorporated in 1962. While the association's charter had never specifically excluded non-white student participation, none actually participated until 1967, when all-black Gibbs High School not only participated in basketball but won the state championship. In 1968 the FIAA disbanded. The FHSAA has never comprehensively incorporated the achievements of the black high schools into their record books.

In 1996 the FHSAA adopted regulations permitting students enrolled in home education programs to participate in interscholastic activities. The regulations would later allow future Heisman Trophy quarterback Tim Tebow to participate in high-school football; similar rules adopted later by other states would thus be called the "Tebow rule".

In May 1997, the Florida Legislature recognized in statute the FHSAA as the governing body for interscholastic athletics in Florida, provided the Association comply with the provisions of a legislatively mandated revamping of its governmental structure.

The name was changed back to Florida High School Athletic Association in 2002. As of August 2007, the FHSAA has a membership of 748 schools.

In 2017, the association adopted a points method of ranking football teams for state championship playoffs. Points are awarded on the basis of wins, and losses, opponents records, and past playoff records.

In 2023, the association's medical advisory committee recommended a requirement that female athletes, the majority of whom are minor children, must submit menstruation info to schools. The recommendation included age of their first period, days between menstrual cycles, and date of their most recent period. Several Florida pediatricians have reportedly warned that this sensitive medical information could be easily accessed by coaches or teachers without oversight, and parent advocates reportedly warned that the program would not have sufficient protections against the data being lost or sold by third parties running the period-tracking databases. Women's advocates also warned that the data could be used to falsely accuse teenagers, who often do not menstruate for months at a time due to the strain of athletic practice, of having become pregnant and seeking abortions criminalized under Florida law.

In early February 2023, the FHSAA voted against making menstrual questions mandatory. The approved physical evaluation form removed the controversial questions about an athlete's menstrual history but also changed a question on the form for student-athletes to report their "sex assigned at birth." The previous form simply asked the athlete's "sex."

== Sports programs ==
The FHSAA oversees the following sports:

=== Sanctioned sports ===
- Baseball
- Basketball
- Cross country
- Football (Boys)
- Golf
- Soccer
- Softball
- Swimming and diving
- Tennis
- Track and field
- Adapted track and field
- Volleyball (Girls)
- Weightlifting (Boys)
- Wrestling
- Esports

=== Recognized sports ===
- Bowling
- Competitive cheerleading
- Flag football (Girls)
- Lacrosse
- Volleyball (Boys)
- Water polo
- Weightlifting (Girls)

== Competitive classifications ==
As in most areas, high schools compete in sports in two types of division. One, because of logistical and geographical constraints, is necessarily local: large schools play small ones in the same area. There are four geographical regions for most sports, each subdivided into up to 16 districts, typically four for larger school classifications and two for smaller school classifications, to reduce travel time and expense for conference play.

Another level of classification is made based on student population and is statewide. Eventually, schools with the best records in this type of classification will meet each other for seasonal playoffs to determine the state champion. That classification is calculated every two years for each sport and provides schools the opportunity to appeal their classification based on certain factors, primarily transportation expense. There are as many as eight classes, from 1A to 8A, based on student population, the largest schools compete in 8A.

For 2019–20, the schools were classified based upon the total number of high school students, as follows:

- Class 8A - 2,406-4,799
- Class 7A - 2,009-2,404
- Class 6A - 1,663-1,993
- Class 5A - 1,169-1,648
- Class 4A - 752-1,153
- Class 3A - 384-749
- Class 2A - 56-376
- Class 1A - 100-600

Bracket 1A is specifically identified as "Rural".

Previously in 2017–18, the brackets were:

- Class 8A - 2,332-4,492
- Class 7A - 1,939-2,331
- Class 6A - 1,593-1,938
- Class 5A - 1,115-1,592
- Class 4A - 681-1,114
- Class 3A - 291-680
- Class 2A - 1-290
- Class 1A - 1-600

Class 1A-4A are no longer broken down into districts. Their "districts" are listed as "Independent". These teams are eligible to compete within the FHSAA State Series.

== FHSAA's All-Century Football Team ==
FHSAA's All-Century Team was selected in December 2007, to celebrate 100 years of high school football in Florida. It was selected by a panel of Florida high school experts. The Florida High School Athletic Association lists the 34 greatest high school football players in state history, including iconic names such as Rick Casares, Jack Youngblood, and Emmitt Smith. In conjunction with selecting the All-Century team, the FHSAA named an All-Century Coaching Staff.

== Governance ==
The FHSAA is not a state agency. Its board of directors is the executive authority of the Association. The Board is composed of 16 individuals. They are four elected public school representatives from each of the four administrative regions, four elected private school representatives from each of the four administrative regions, three representatives appointed by the Commissioner of Education (one from the two northernmost regions, one from the two southernmost regions, and a third shall be appointed to balance the board for diversity or state population trends, or both), two elected district superintendents from the two northernmost regions, two elected district superintendents from the southernmost regions, and the Commissioner of Education or their designated representative. Board members, with the exception of the Commissioner of Education or their designated representative, shall serve a three-year term and eligible to succeed themselves in office once. The Board of Directors elect a president and vice president from among its members.

In 2023, the Florida House of Representatives proposed HB 225, which would amend the current statutes dictating how the FHSAA operates. Governance changes through this amendment, as last updated on February 15, includes the reduction of board members from 16 to 9, requiring all board members to be appointed by the governor rather than elected, removing language requiring board diversity, and requiring the FHSAA budget and bylaw changes to be approved by the State Board of Education. As of late February, the bill was still in committee.
