= Cliff Lewis =

Cliff Lewis may refer to:

- Cliff Lewis (quarterback) (1923–2002), American football player for the Cleveland Browns
- Cliff Lewis (linebacker) (born 1959), former linebacker in the National Football League
- Cliff Lewis (Matlock), a fictional character in Matlock
