= Dyron Nix =

American basketball player (1967–2013)

Personal information
- Born: February 11, 1967 Meridian, Mississippi, U.S.
- Died: December 15, 2013 (aged 46) Atlanta, Georgia, U.S.
- Listed height: 6 ft 7 in (2.01 m)
- Listed weight: 210 lb (95 kg)

Career information
- High school: Fort Walton Beach (Fort Walton Beach, Florida)
- College: Tennessee (1985–1989)
- NBA draft: 1989: 2nd round, 29th overall pick
- Drafted by: Charlotte Hornets
- Playing career: 1989–2000
- Position: Small forward
- Number: 23

Career history
- 1989–1990: Indiana Pacers
- 1990–1991: ALM Évreux
- 1991: Grand Rapids Hoops
- 1991–1992: Mayoral Málaga
- 1992–1993: Maccabi Tel Aviv
- 1993: Omaha Racers
- 1993: Grupo Libro Valladolid
- 1993–1994: Rochester Renegade
- 1994: 7Up Joventut
- 1994–1995: Somontano Huesca
- 1996: Festina Andorra
- 1996–1997: Fórum Filatélico
- 1997–1998: Irakleio
- 1998–1999: Cáceres
- 1999–2000: Cantabria Lobos

Career highlights
- Greek League All-Star (1997); 2× First-team All-SEC (1988, 1989)
- Stats at NBA.com
- Stats at Basketball Reference

Dyron Patrick Nix (February 11, 1967 – December 15, 2013) was an American professional basketball player. During his professional career, he played in the National Basketball Association (NBA), as well as in several other leagues worldwide.

== College career ==
Nix attended Fort Walton Beach High, in Fort Walton Beach, Florida, where he played high school basketball. After high school, Nix, a 6-foot-7-inch (2.01 m), 210-pound (95 kg) small forward, played college basketball for the Tennessee Volunteers, from 1985 to 1989. He was a two-time first team All-SEC performer, in 1988 and 1989. As a junior in 1987–88, Nix led the SEC in scoring, averaging 22.2 points per game. He averaged 21.6 points per game during his senior season.

== Professional career ==
Nix was selected by the Charlotte Hornets, in the second round, with the 29th overall pick, of the 1989 NBA draft. Nix played only one year in the NBA, with the Indiana Pacers, during the 1989–90 season. He averaged 2.0 points per game, in 20 games played.

== Personal life ==
Nix's daughter Cree, began her college basketball career at Lipscomb University, and then she transferred to the University of Illinois at Chicago.

Nix died of pneumonia, on December 15, 2013, in Atlanta. He died at the age of 46.
