= Deiontrez Mount =

American football player (born 1993)

No. 48, 53
- Position: Linebacker

Personal information
- Born: February 26, 1993 (age 33); Pensacola, Florida, U.S.
- Listed height: 6 ft 5 in (1.96 m)
- Listed weight: 253 lb (115 kg)

Career information
- High school: Fort Walton Beach (Fort Walton Beach, Florida)
- College: Louisville (2011–2014)
- NFL draft: 2015: 6th round, 177th overall pick

Career history
- Tennessee Titans (2015); Indianapolis Colts (2016); Denver Broncos (2017–2018); Tampa Bay Vipers (2020)

Career NFL statistics
- Total tackles: 7
- Interceptions: 1
- Stats at Pro Football Reference

Deiontrez Mount (born February 26, 1993) is an American former professional football player who was a linebacker in the National Football League (NFL). He played college football for the Louisville Cardinals and was selected by the Tennessee Titans in the sixth round of the 2015 NFL draft.

== Professional career ==
Pre-draft measurables
Height	Weight	Arm length	Hand span	40-yard dash	10-yard split	20-yard split	20-yard shuttle	Three-cone drill	Vertical jump	Broad jump	Bench press
6 ft 4 3/4 in (1.95 m)	249 lb (113 kg)	33 1/8 in (0.84 m)	9 5/8 in (0.24 m)	4.66 s	1.59 s	2.71 s	4.32 s	7.07 s	31.0 in (0.79 m)	9 ft 11 in (3.02 m)	28 reps
All values from Pro Day

=== Tennessee Titans ===
Mount was selected by the Tennessee Titans in the sixth round, 177th overall, in the 2015 NFL draft. On August 28, 2016, Mount was waived by the Titans.

=== Indianapolis Colts ===
On September 19, 2016, Mount was signed to the practice squad of the Indianapolis Colts. He was promoted to the active roster on December 15, 2016.

On August 18, 2017, Mount was waived/injured by the Colts and placed on injured reserve. He was released on August 25, 2017.

=== Denver Broncos ===
On August 29, 2017, Mount signed with the Denver Broncos. He was waived on September 2, 2017, and was signed to the practice squad the next day. He was promoted to the active roster on November 15, 2017.

On May 30, 2018, Mount suffered a ruptured Achilles tendon during the Broncos' organized team activities (OTAs), and was ruled out the entire 2018 season. He was waived/injured on June 11, 2018, and officially placed on injured reserve after clearing waivers.

=== Tampa Bay Vipers ===
Mount was selected by the Tampa Bay Vipers of the XFL in round two of phase three of the 2020 XFL draft. He had his contract terminated when the league suspended operations on April 10, 2020.
