= Gary Leonard =

American basketball player (born 1967)

Personal information
- Born: February 16, 1967 (age 59) Belleville, Illinois, U.S.
- Listed height: 7 ft 1 in (2.16 m)
- Listed weight: 250 lb (113 kg)

Career information
- High school: Belleville East (Belleville, Illinois)
- College: Missouri (1985–1989)
- NBA draft: 1989: 2nd round, 34th overall pick
- Drafted by: Minnesota Timberwolves
- Playing career: 1989–1992
- Position: Center
- Number: 52, 34

Career history
- 1989–1990: Minnesota Timberwolves
- 1990: Sioux Falls Skyforce
- 1990–1991: Cedar Rapids Silver Bullets
- 1991–1992: Atlanta Hawks
- 1992–1993: Peristeri Athens
- 1993: Milon Athens
- Stats at NBA.com
- Stats at Basketball Reference

Gary Francis Leonard (born February 16, 1967) is an American former professional basketball player. At 7'1" and 295 lbs, he played center. Leonard played college basketball for the Missouri Tigers before being selected with the 34th pick in the 1989 NBA draft by the Minnesota Timberwolves. In the NBA, Leonard played three seasons for the Timberwolves and the Atlanta Hawks.

== College career ==
In 1989, Leonard emerged as one of the leading centers available for the 1989 NBA draft with a strong senior season at the University of Missouri, posting career highs in points (10.4 ppg) and rebounds (5.5 rpg), shooting .593 from the field and totalling 42 blocked shots. He was the only Missouri player to start every game in 1988–89, after being a part-time starter during his first three years. His .628 field goal percentage as a junior was among the nation's leaders in 1987–88. He helped Missouri advance to the "Sweet 16" of the NCAA tournament that season, where they lost to Syracuse University.

== Professional career ==
Drafted with the 34th overall pick by the Minnesota Timberwolves in 1989, Leonard spent one season in Minnesota and played from 1990 to 1992 with the Atlanta Hawks. He also played one season in the Continental Basketball Association (CBA), splitting the 1990–91 season between the Sioux Falls Skyforce and Cedar Rapids Silver Bullets. Leonard averaged 3.2 points and 3.8 rebounds in 19 career CBA games. He also played in Greece for Peristeri Athens and Milon Athens.
