= 1989 NBA draft =

Basketball player selection

General information
- Sport: Basketball
- Date: June 27, 1989
- Location: Felt Forum, Madison Square Garden (New York City, New York)
- Network: TBS

Overview
- 54 total selections in 2 rounds
- League: NBA
- First selection: Pervis Ellison (Sacramento Kings)
- Hall of Famers: 3: PG Tim Hardaway; C Vlade Divac; PF Dino Rađa

The 1989 NBA draft took place on June 27, 1989, in New York City. Despite eight of the top ten picks being considered busts, including the first two picks Pervis Ellison and Danny Ferry, the draft produced many talented players such as Shawn Kemp, Glen Rice, Sean Elliott, Nick Anderson, Dana Barros, Tim Hardaway, Vlade Divac, Clifford Robinson, B. J. Armstrong and Mookie Blaylock.

The draft was reduced from three rounds in the previous year to the two-round format that is still in use to the present day. As a result, NBA drafts from this season until 1995 produced the lowest number of total draft picks selected at 54 overall selections.

This was the first draft for the Minnesota Timberwolves and Orlando Magic, prior to their inaugural season. This was also the first draft televised prime time on U.S. national television.

== Draft selections ==
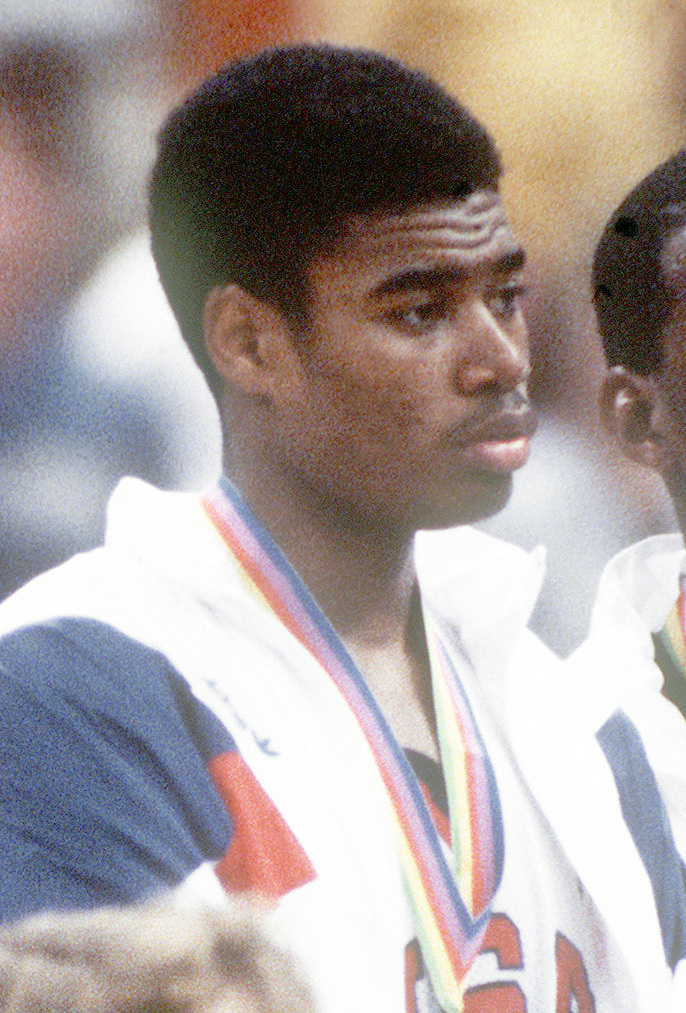
Pervis Ellison was selected first overall by the Sacramento Kings.

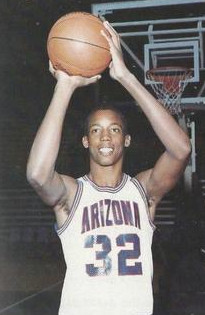
Sean Elliott was selected 3rd overall by the San Antonio Spurs.

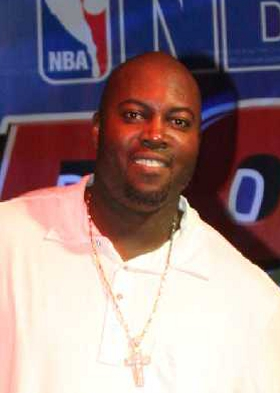
Glen Rice was selected 4th overall by the Miami Heat.

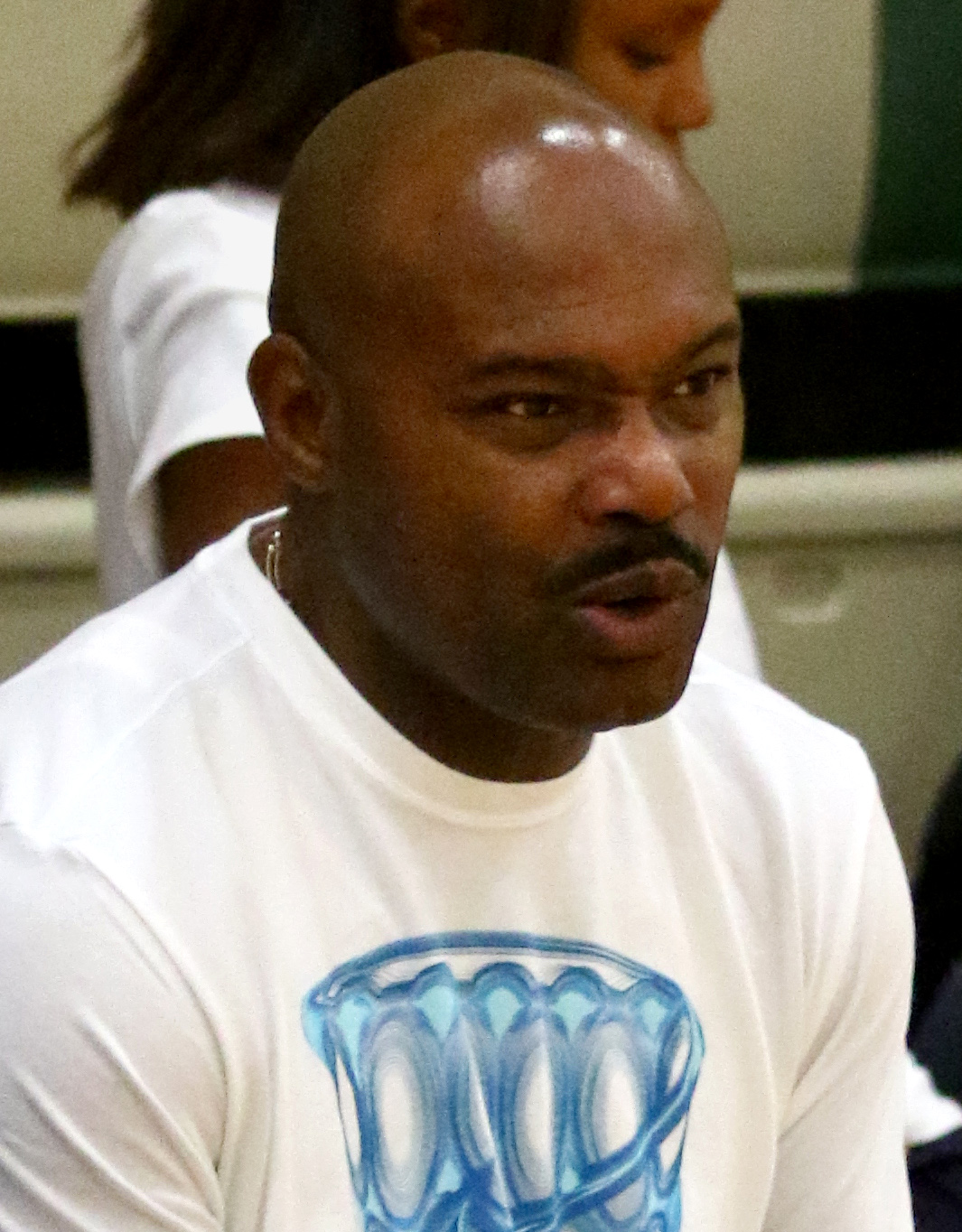
Tim Hardaway was selected 14th overall by the Golden State Warriors.

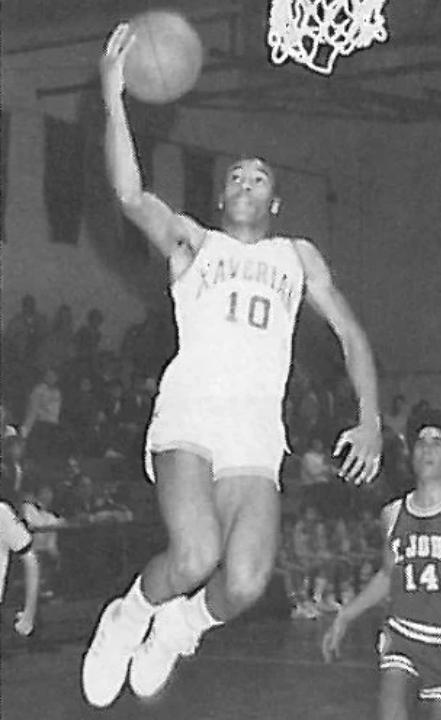
Dana Barros was selected 16th overall by the Seattle SuperSonics.

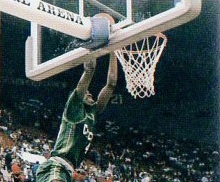
Shawn Kemp was selected 17th overall by the Seattle SuperSonics.

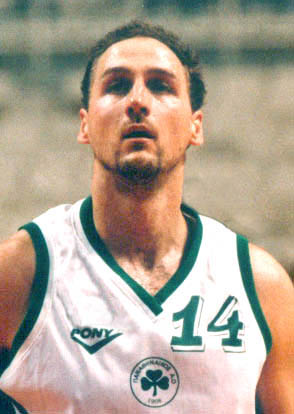
Dino Rađa was selected 40th overall by the Boston Celtics.

PG	Point guard	SG	Shooting guard	SF	Small forward	PF	Power forward	C	Center

^	Denotes player who has been inducted to the Naismith Memorial Basketball Hall of Fame
*	Denotes player who has been selected for at least one All-Star Game and All-NBA Team
^{+}	Denotes player who has been selected for at least one All-Star Game
^{#}	Denotes player who has never appeared in an NBA regular-season or playoff game

Round	Pick	Player	Pos.	Nationality (Note: Nationality indicates the player's national team or representative nationality. If a player has not competed at the international level, then the nationality indicates the national team which the player is eligible to represent according to FIBA rules.)	NBA team	School/Club team
1	1	Pervis Ellison	PF	United States	Sacramento Kings	Louisville (Sr.)
1	2	Danny Ferry	PF	United States	Los Angeles Clippers	Duke (Sr.)
1	3	Sean Elliott^{+}	SF/SG	United States	San Antonio Spurs	Arizona (Sr.)
1	4	Glen Rice^{*}	SF	United States	Miami Heat	Michigan (Sr.)
1	5	J. R. Reid	PF/C	United States	Charlotte Hornets	North Carolina (Jr.)
1	6	Stacey King	C	United States	Chicago Bulls (from New Jersey)	Oklahoma (Sr.)
1	7	George McCloud	SG/SF	United States	Indiana Pacers	Florida State (Sr.)
1	8	Randy White	PF	United States	Dallas Mavericks	Louisiana Tech (Sr.)
1	9	Tom Hammonds	PF/C	United States	Washington Bullets	Georgia Tech (Sr.)
1	10	Pooh Richardson	PG	United States	Minnesota Timberwolves	UCLA (Sr.)
1	11	Nick Anderson	SF/SG	United States	Orlando Magic	Illinois (Jr.)
1	12	Mookie Blaylock^{+}	PG	United States	New Jersey Nets (from Portland)	Oklahoma (Sr.)
1	13	Michael Smith	PF	United States	Boston Celtics	BYU (Sr.)
1	14	Tim Hardaway^	PG	United States	Golden State Warriors	UTEP (Sr.)
1	15	Todd Lichti	SG	United States	Denver Nuggets	Stanford (Sr.)
1	16	Dana Barros^{+}	PG	United States	Seattle SuperSonics (from Houston via Golden State)	Boston College (Sr.)
1	17	Shawn Kemp^{*}	PF/C	United States	Seattle SuperSonics (from Philadelphia)	Concord HS (Elkhart, Indiana)
1	18	B. J. Armstrong^{+}	PG	United States	Chicago Bulls	Iowa (Sr.)
1	19	Kenny Payne	PF	United States	Philadelphia 76ers (from Seattle)	Louisville (Sr.)
1	20	Jeff Sanders	PF/C	United States	Chicago Bulls (from Milwaukee via Seattle)	Georgia Southern (Sr.)
1	21	Blue Edwards	SF/SG	United States	Utah Jazz	East Carolina (Sr.)
1	22	Byron Irvin	SG	United States	Portland Trail Blazers (from New York)	Missouri (Sr.)
1	23	Roy Marble	SG/SF	United States	Atlanta Hawks	Iowa (Sr.)
1	24	Anthony Cook	PF/C	United States	Phoenix Suns (traded to Detroit)	Arizona (Sr.)
1	25	John Morton	PG	United States	Cleveland Cavaliers	Seton Hall (Sr.)
1	26	Vlade Divac^	C	Yugoslavia	Los Angeles Lakers	KK Partizan (Yugoslavia)
1	27	Kenny Battle	PF	United States	Detroit Pistons (traded to Phoenix)	Illinois (Sr.)
2	28	Sherman Douglas	G	United States	Miami Heat	Syracuse (Sr.)
2	29	Dyron Nix	F	United States	Charlotte Hornets	Tennessee (Sr.)
2	30	Frank Kornet	F	United States	Milwaukee Bucks	Vanderbilt (Sr.)
2	31	Jeff Martin	G	United States	Los Angeles Clippers	Murray State (Sr.)
2	32	Stanley Brundy	F	United States	New Jersey Nets	DePaul (Sr.)
2	33	Jay Edwards	G	United States	Los Angeles Clippers	Indiana (So.)
2	34	Gary Leonard	C	United States	Minnesota Timberwolves	Missouri (Sr.)
2	35	Pat Durham	F	United States	Dallas Mavericks	Colorado State (Sr.)
2	36	Clifford Robinson^{+}	PF/C	United States	Portland Trail Blazers	Connecticut (Sr.)
2	37	Michael Ansley	F	United States	Orlando Magic	Alabama (Sr.)
2	38	Doug West	G/F	United States	Minnesota Timberwolves	Villanova (Sr.)
2	39	Ed Horton	PF/C	United States	Washington Bullets	Iowa (Sr.)
2	40	Dino Rađa^	PF	Yugoslavia	Boston Celtics	KK Split (Yugoslavia)
2	41	Doug Roth	C	United States	Washington Bullets	Tennessee (Sr.)
2	42	Michael Cutright^{#}	SG	United States	Denver Nuggets	McNeese State (Sr.)
2	43	Chucky Brown	PF	United States	Cleveland Cavaliers	NC State (Sr.)
2	44	Reggie Cross^{#}	PF	United States	Philadelphia 76ers	Hawaii (Sr.)
2	45	Scott Haffner	G	United States	Miami Heat	Evansville (Sr.)
2	46	Ricky Blanton	F	United States	Phoenix Suns	LSU (Sr.)
2	47	Reggie Turner^{#}	SF	United States	Denver Nuggets	UAB (Sr.)
2	48	Junie Lewis^{#}	PG	United States	Utah Jazz	South Alabama (Sr.)
2	49	Haywoode Workman	G	United States	Atlanta Hawks	Oral Roberts (Sr.)
2	50	Brian Quinnett	F	United States	New York Knicks	Washington State (Sr.)
2	51	Mike Morrison	G	United States	Phoenix Suns	Loyola (MD) (Sr.)
2	52	Greg Grant	G	United States	Phoenix Suns	Trenton State (Sr.)
2	53	Jeff Hodge^{#}	SG	United States	Dallas Mavericks	South Alabama (Sr.)
2	54	Toney Mack^{#}	SG	United States	Philadelphia 76ers	Georgia (Jr.)

== Notable undrafted players ==
These players were not selected in the 1989 draft but played at least one game in the NBA.

Player	Position	Nationality	School/Club team
Raymond Brown	PF	United States	Idaho (Sr.)
Torgeir Bryn	PF/C	Norway	Texas State (Sr.)
Steve Bucknall	SG/SF	England	North Carolina (Sr.)
Adrian Caldwell	PF	United States	Lamar (Sr.)
Chris Childs	SG	United States	Boise State (Sr.)
Lanard Copeland	SG	United States; Australia	Georgia State (Sr.)
Terry Davis	PF/C	United States	Virginia Union (Sr.)
Tony Dawson	SF	United States	Florida State (Sr.)
Byron Dinkins	PG	United States	Charlotte (Sr.)
Aleksandar Đorđević	SG	Yugoslavia	Partizan Belgrade (Yugoslavia)
Terry Dozier	SF	United States	South Carolina (Sr.)
Andrew Gaze	F	Australia	Seton Hall (Fr.)
Paul Graham	SG/SF	United States	Ohio (Sr.)
Alvin Heggs	SF	United States	Texas (Sr.)
Mike Higgins	PF	United States; Spain	Northern Colorado (Sr.)
Tom Hovasse	SF	United States	Penn State (Sr.)
Jaren Jackson	SG	United States	Georgetown (Sr.)
Eric Johnson	PG	United States; Spain	Nebraska (Sr.)
Thomas Jordan	PF	United States	Oklahoma State (So.)
Stan Kimbrough	PG	United States	Xavier (Sr.)
Jeff Lebo	SG	United States	North Carolina (Sr.)
Clifford Lett	PG	United States	Florida (Sr.)
Mel McCants	SF/PF	United States	Purdue (Sr.)
Charles Smith	PG/SG	United States	Georgetown (Sr.)
Jay Taylor	SG/SF	United States	Eastern Illinois (Sr.)
Leonard Taylor	PF	United States	California (Sr.)
Gundars Vētra	SG/SF	Soviet Union	VEF Rīga (Soviet Union)
Kennard Winchester	SF/SG	United States	Averett (Sr.)
Howard Wright	SF/PF	United States	Stanford (Sr.)

== Early entrants ==
=== College underclassmen ===
For the seventh year in a row and the eleventh time in twelve years, no college underclassman would withdraw their entry into the NBA draft. Not only that, but this would be the fourth year in a row where a player that qualified for the status of a "college underclassman" would be playing professional basketball overseas, with the French-born Rudy Bourgarel playing for the Boulogne-Levallois in France after leaving Marist College. In addition to that, this would also be the first year where an international player would be considered a direct underclassman to participate in an NBA draft, with Vlade Divac from the KK Partizan Belgrade of the Eastern Bloc nation known as SFR Yugoslavia (now since separated, with Divac representing Serbia) being the first ever international underclassman to be taken directly from an overseas team without previously going to an American college or playing for any prior American institution. Including those two players and Andrew Gaze, who had previously played in Australia for multiple years before playing only one season at Seton Hall University while being over the age of 22 by that time, the number of underclassmen would officially be considered a grand total of fourteen players instead of eleven (or twelve including Gaze). Regardless, the following college basketball players successfully applied for early draft entrance.

- (United States) Nick Anderson – G, Illinois (junior)
- (Netherlands) Martin Den Hengst – C, Sheridan (freshman)
- (United States) Jay Edwards – G, Indiana (sophomore)
- (Australia) Andrew Gaze – Seton Hall (freshman)
- (United States) Benny Green – G, Tennessee–Chattanooga (junior)
- (United States) Shawn Kemp – F, Trinity Valley CC (freshman)
- (United States) Toney Mack – G, Georgia (junior)
- (United States) J. R. Reid – F, North Carolina (junior)
- (United States) Maurice Selvin – G, Puget Sound (sophomore)
- (Nigeria) Alex Soyebo – C, Northland Pioneer (freshman)
- (United States) Johnny Steptoe – F, Southern (sophomore)
- (United States) Richard Whitmore – G, Brown (junior)

=== International players ===
This would be the first time in NBA history where an international born and raised player would be considered an underclassman in an NBA draft. The following international player successfully applied for early draft entrance.

- (Socialist Federal Republic of Yugoslavia) Vlade Divac – C, KK Partizan (Yugoslavia)

=== Other eligible players ===
This would be the fourth year in a row with at least one player that previously played in college entering the NBA draft as an underclassman. It was also the second year in a row where a player would qualify as an eligible underclassman for the NBA draft while previously playing for a French-based team in order to do so.

Player	Team	Note	Ref.
(France) Rudy Bourgarel	Boulogne-Levallois (France)	Left Marist in 1988; playing professionally since the 1988–89 season	

== Invited attendees ==
The 1989 NBA draft is considered to be the twelfth NBA draft to have utilized what's properly considered the "green room" experience for NBA prospects. The NBA's green room is a staging area where anticipated draftees often sit with their families and representatives, waiting for their names to be called on draft night. Often being positioned either in front of or to the side of the podium (in this case, being positioned in the Madison Square Garden's Felt Forum for the eighth year in a row), once a player heard his name, he would walk to the podium to shake hands and take promotional photos with the NBA commissioner. From there, the players often conducted interviews with various media outlets while backstage. However, once the NBA draft started to air nationally on TV starting with the 1980 NBA draft, the green room evolved from players waiting to hear their name called and then shaking hands with these select players who were often called to the hotel to take promotional pictures with the NBA commissioner a day or two after the draft concluded to having players in real-time waiting to hear their names called up and then shaking hands with David Stern, the NBA's commissioner at the time. The NBA compiled its list of green room invites through collective voting by the NBA's team presidents and general managers alike, which in this year's case belonged to only what they believed were the top 16 prospects at the time. Despite the large amount of invites that held some very successful players (including the first truly international born, raised, and developed prospect in Vlade Divac), some notable absences from this group outside of future Hall of Famer Dino Rada include Dana Barros from Boston College and power forward Shawn Kemp, with Gary Leonard and Clifford Robinson both waiting into the second round themselves. Even so, the following players were invited to attend this year's draft festivities live and in person.

- (United States) Nick Anderson – SG/SF, Illinois
- (United States) B. J. Armstrong – PG, Iowa
- (United States) Mookie Blaylock – PG, Oklahoma
- (Socialist Federal Republic of Yugoslavia) / (Serbia) Vlade Divac – C, KK Partizan (Yugoslavia)
- (United States) Sean Elliott – SG/SF, Arizona
- (United States) Pervis Ellison – PF, Louisville
- (United States) Danny Ferry – PF, Duke
- (United States) Tom Hammonds – PF/C, Georgia Tech
- (United States) Tim Hardaway – PG, UTEP
- (United States) Stacey King – C, Oklahoma
- (United States) Gary Leonard – C, Missouri
- (United States) George McCloud – SG/SF, Florida State
- (United States) John Morton – PG, Seton Hall
- (United States) Glen Rice – SF, Michigan
- (United States) Clifford Robinson – PF/C, Connecticut
- (United States) Randy White – PF, Louisiana Tech

== See also ==
- List of first overall NBA draft picks
