= Carver-Hill School =

- Crestview, Okaloosa County, Florida; United States

Information
- School type: Public, Segregated public school
- School board: Okaloosa District Schools
- School district: Okaloosa County School District
- Grades: 1–12
- Athletics conference: FIAA

Carver-Hill School was a school for African Americans in Okaloosa County, Florida. It was the only school for African Americans in the county. Its former lunchroom housed the Carver-Hill Museum until a museum building was constructed.

The school colors were blue and white and its mascot was the panther.

A school for African Americans was built in Crestview in 1926. The school received support from Julius Rosenwald's Rosenwald School fund. It became known as the Crestview Colored School. A new school was eventually built and named for George Washington Carver. The name of Reverend Edwin Hill was eventually added. The school was closed in 1965. In 1969, a museum was established. In 1975, the museum was opened on land loaned by the city, and in 1979 the city formalized the museum.

The State of Florida's archives include a photograph of a Carver-Hill student at John C. Beasley State Park in Fort Walton Beach.
