= Bob Sikes Airport =

Coordinates: 30°46′43.80″N 086°31′19.60″W

- IATA: CEW; ICAO: KCEW; FAA LID: CEW

Summary
- Airport type: Public use
- Owner: Okaloosa County, Florida
- Operator: Tracy Stage, Manager
- Serves: Crestview, Florida
- Location: Okaloosa County, Florida
- Elevation AMSL: 213 ft (65 m)
- Website: Bob Sikes Airport Website
- Interactive map of Bob Sikes Airport

Runways
Direction	Length		Surface
Direction	ft	m	Surface
17/35	8,005	2,440	Asphalt

Statistics (2000)
- Aircraft operations: 48,600
- Based aircraft: 49
- Source: Federal Aviation Administration

Bob Sikes Airport (IATA: CEW, ICAO: KCEW, FAA LID: CEW), named for Robert L. F. Sikes, is a public-use airport located 3 miles (4.8 km) northeast of the central business district of the city of Crestview in Okaloosa County, Florida, United States. The airport is publicly owned and supports a mix of general aviation and aerospace corporations performing modification work on military aircraft. The airport sees frequent military training use by aircraft based at Eglin AFB, Duke Field, Hurlburt Field, NAS Pensacola, NAS Whiting Field and Fort Novosel.

In September 2022, Gulf Air Group announced a $16 million expansion project for the airport that would include the construction of a new aircraft hangar complex. This facility would serve as the maintenance hub for the company's operations.

== See also ==
- List of airports in Florida
