= Akeem Spence =

American football player (born 1991)

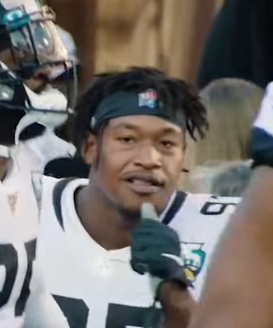
- Spence with the Jacksonville Jaguars in 2019

No. 97, 93, 66, 52, 69, 55, 78
- Position: Defensive tackle

Personal information
- Born: November 29, 1991 (age 34); Navarre, Florida, U.S.
- Listed height: 6 ft 1 in (1.85 m)
- Listed weight: 303 lb (137 kg)

Career information
- High school: Fort Walton Beach (Fort Walton Beach, Florida)
- College: Illinois (2009–2012)
- NFL draft: 2013: 4th round, 100th overall pick

Career history
- Tampa Bay Buccaneers (2013–2016); Detroit Lions (2017); Miami Dolphins (2018); Philadelphia Eagles (2019); Jacksonville Jaguars (2019); New England Patriots (2020); Washington Football Team (2021); Denver Broncos (2021)*; San Francisco 49ers (2022)
- * Offseason or practice squad member only

Career NFL statistics
- Total tackles: 215
- Sacks: 10.5
- Forced fumbles: 1
- Fumble recoveries: 4
- Stats at Pro Football Reference

Akeem Spence (born November 29, 1991) is an American former professional football player who was a defensive tackle in the National Football League (NFL). He was selected by the Tampa Bay Buccaneers in the fourth round of the 2013 NFL draft. He played college football for the Illinois Fighting Illini.

== Early life ==
Spence was born in Navarre, Florida. He attended Fort Walton Beach High School, and played for the Fort Walton Beach Vikings high school football team. He recorded 80 tackles and five sacks as a senior and helped lead team to a 10–2 record and district championship. Posted 67 tackles, 16 tackles for loss and two sacks in 2007 as a junior. Rated as a three-star recruit by Rivals.com, he accepted an athletic scholarship from the University of Illinois over offers from Iowa State and Syracuse.

== College career ==
While attending the University of Illinois at Urbana–Champaign, Spence played for the Illinois Fighting Illini football team from 2009 to 2012. After redshirting in 2009, he started all 13 games at defensive tackle alongside All-American Corey Liuget. He had 45 tackles, four tackles for a loss, one quarterback sacks, two hurries and one fumble recovery on the season. In 2011, he started all 13 games on the season, he finished ranked fourth on the team with 69 tackles on the season, including 5.5 tackles for a loess and 1.5 sacks. As a redshirt junior, he started all 12 games in 2012 and started all 38 games of his college career at defensive tackle. He ranked third on the team in tackles with 72 and tied for second on team with 7.0 tackles for a loss and had one sack.

Spence announced on December 19, 2012 that he would forgo his senior season and enter the NFL Draft.

== Professional career ==
Pre-draft measurables
Height	Weight	Arm length	Hand span	40-yard dash	10-yard split	20-yard split	20-yard shuttle	Three-cone drill	Vertical jump	Broad jump	Bench press
6 ft 0 5/8 in (1.84 m)	307 lb (139 kg)	33 1/2 in (0.85 m)	10 in (0.25 m)	5.15 s	1.74 s	2.81 s	4.72 s	7.82 s	30 in (0.76 m)	8 ft 11 in (2.72 m)	37 reps
All values from NFL Combine

=== Tampa Bay Buccaneers ===
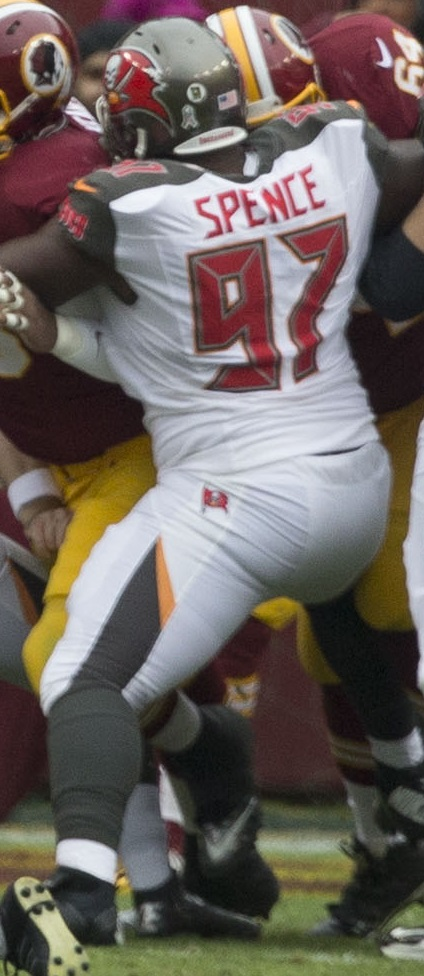
Spence with the Buccaneers in 2014

On April 27, 2013, Spence was selected by the Tampa Bay Buccaneers in the fourth round (100th overall pick) of the 2013 NFL draft. The Buccaneers signed him to a rookie contract on May 15, 2013. Spence signed his contract on May 15, 2013, a four-year deal that's worth $2,644,424. Spence collected a $484,424 signing bonus.

On December 26, 2015, the Tampa Bay Buccaneers placed Spence on injured reserve.

=== Detroit Lions ===
On March 10, 2017, Spence signed a three-year, $9 million contract with the Detroit Lions. He started 11 games during the 2017 season, recording 39 tackles, three sacks and a forced fumble. Spence was named the 2017 recipient of the Detroit Lions Media-Friendly Good Guy Award by the Detroit chapter of the PFWA and Detroit Sports Media Association.

=== Miami Dolphins ===
On May 3, 2018, Spence was traded to the Miami Dolphins for a conditional 2019 seventh round pick, previously acquired from the Browns in a trade for Jarvis Landry.

On August 27, 2019, Spence was released from the Miami Dolphins.

=== Philadelphia Eagles ===
Spence signed a one-year contract with the Philadelphia Eagles on September 10, 2019. He was released after playing in six games on October 21, 2019.

=== Jacksonville Jaguars ===
On October 25, 2019, Spence was signed by the Jacksonville Jaguars.

=== New England Patriots ===
On November 21, 2020, the New England Patriots signed Spence to their practice squad. He was elevated to the active roster on November 28 for the team's week 12 game against the Arizona Cardinals, and reverted to the practice squad after the game. On December 5, 2020, Spence was promoted to the active roster.

On August 31, 2021, Spence was released by the Patriots.

=== Washington Football Team ===
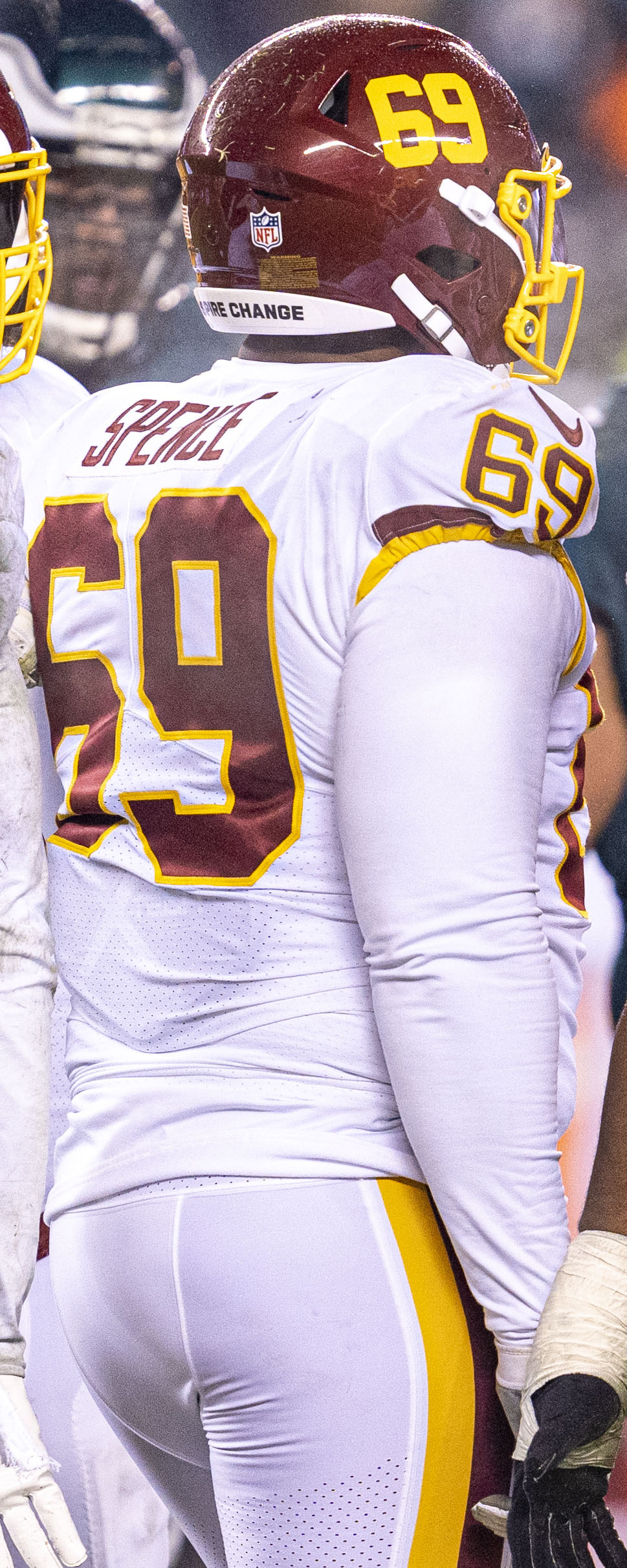
Spence with the Washington Football Team in 2021

On December 16, 2021, Spence signed with the Washington Football Team. He was waived on December 24.

=== Denver Broncos ===
On December 28, 2021, Spence was signed to the Denver Broncos practice squad. His contract expired when the team's season ended on January 8, 2022.

=== San Francisco 49ers ===
On August 1, 2022, Spence was signed by the San Francisco 49ers. He was released on August 30, 2022 and signed to the practice squad the next day. He was promoted to the active roster on October 8. He was released on November 1, 2022. He signed back to the practice squad the next day. He was signed to the active roster on December 15, 2022. He was released on January 3, 2023. Spence was re-signed to the 49ers’ practice squad on January 6, 2023. His practice squad contract with the team expired after the season on January 29, 2023.

== NFL career statistics ==
Legend
**Bold**	Career high

Year	Team	Games		Tackles					Interceptions					Fumbles			
Year	Team	GP	GS	Cmb	Solo	Ast	Sck	TFL	Int	Yds	TD	Lng	PD	FF	FR	Yds	TD
2013	TAM	**16**	14	29	19	10	1.0	2	0	0	0	0	0	0	1	0	0
2014	TAM	**16**	5	37	**27**	10	**3.0**	4	0	0	0	0	0	0	**2**	0	0
2015	TAM	8	7	11	8	3	1.0	1	0	0	0	0	0	0	0	0	0
2016	TAM	**16**	4	19	10	9	0.5	2	0	0	0	0	0	0	0	0	0
2017	DET	**16**	11	39	19	**20**	**3.0**	4	0	0	0	0	0	**1**	0	0	0
2018	MIA	**16**	**16**	**42**	23	19	2.0	**6**	0	0	0	0	0	0	1	0	0
2019	JAX	9	0	11	8	3	0.0	0	0	0	0	0	0	0	0	0	0
2019	PHI	6	0	7	6	1	0.0	0	0	0	0	0	0	0	0	0	0
2020	NWE	6	0	9	3	6	0.0	0	0	0	0	0	0	0	0	0	0
2021	WAS	1	0	1	0	1	0.0	0	0	0	0	0	0	0	0	0	0
2022	SFO	7	0	10	4	6	0.0	0	0	0	0	0	0	0	0	0	0
		117	57	215	127	88	10.5	19	0	0	0	0	0	1	4	0	0

== Personal life ==
On January 14, 2014, Spence was arrested in Flomaton, Alabama on charges of misdemeanor marijuana possession. He was later suspended one game by the NFL for the incident. During the 2017 NFL season, Spence participated in a protest during the national anthem. Following this, he reported that his father, a contractor, was denied work due to his protest.
