= Toney Mack =

American basketball player (born 1967)

Personal information
- Born: May 3, 1967 (age 59) Brandon, Florida, U.S.
- Listed height: 6 ft 5 in (1.96 m)
- Listed weight: 205 lb (93 kg)

Career information
- High school: Brandon (Brandon, Florida)
- College: Georgia (1985–1988)
- NBA draft: 1989: 2nd round, 54th overall pick
- Drafted by: Philadelphia 76ers
- Position: Power forward / center

Career highlights
- Third-team Parade All-American (1985); Florida Mr. Basketball (1985)
- Stats at Basketball Reference

Toney Atmorer Mack (born May 3, 1967) is an American former professional basketball player.

A forward from Brandon, Florida, Mack was hailed as a young Dominique Wilkins. A prolific scorer at Brandon High School, in 1985, Mack was named Florida's Mr. Basketball. Mack attended the University of Georgia but was unable to finish due to academic issues. Despite his failure to finish his collegiate career at Georgia, Mack was picked in the second round by the Philadelphia 76ers in 1989. He played for the Topeka Sizzlers in the Continental League. In 2011, the Orlando Sentinel named him one of the top nine high school basketball players in Florida History.
