= Florida Interscholastic Athletic Association =

The Florida Interscholastic Athletics Association was, during segregation, the organization of the athletic programs black high schools in Florida. It divided schools into classes to match teams from similar schools, and set up game schedules. It existed from 1932 — earlier than that there were too few black high schools — to 1968, when Florida schools integrated.

Member schools included:

- Bates Avenue, Eustis
- Belleview Senior High, Belleview
- Blanche Ely High School, Pompano Beach
- Booker T. Washington High School, Inverness
- Booker T. Washington High School, Miami
- Booker T. Washington High School, Pensacola
- Campbell Street High School, Daytona Beach
- Carver High School, Miami
- Carver Heights High School, Leesburg
- Carver-Hill School, Crestview
- Chamberlain High School, Tampa
- Crispus Attucks High School, Hollywood
- Dillard High School, Ft. Lauderdale
- Gibbs High School, St. Petersburg
- Matthew Gilbert High School, Jacksonville
- Howard High School, Ocala
- Howard High School, Orlando
- Jones High School, Orlando
- Middleton High School, Tampa
- Kennedy High School, Riviera Beach
- Lake County Training School, Lake County
- Lincoln Park High School, Clermont
- Lincoln High School, Tallahassee
- Mays High School, Miami
- Murry High School, St. Augustine
- Northwestern High School, Miami
- William M. Raines High School, Jacksonville
- Rochelle High School, Lakeland
- Roosevelt High School, West Palm Beach
- Shadeville High School, Crawfordville
- Tivoli High School, DeFuniak Springs
- Union Academy, Bartow
