= John C. Beasley Park =

Park in Okaloosa County, Florida, United States

Coordinates: 30°23′38″N 86°35′3″W

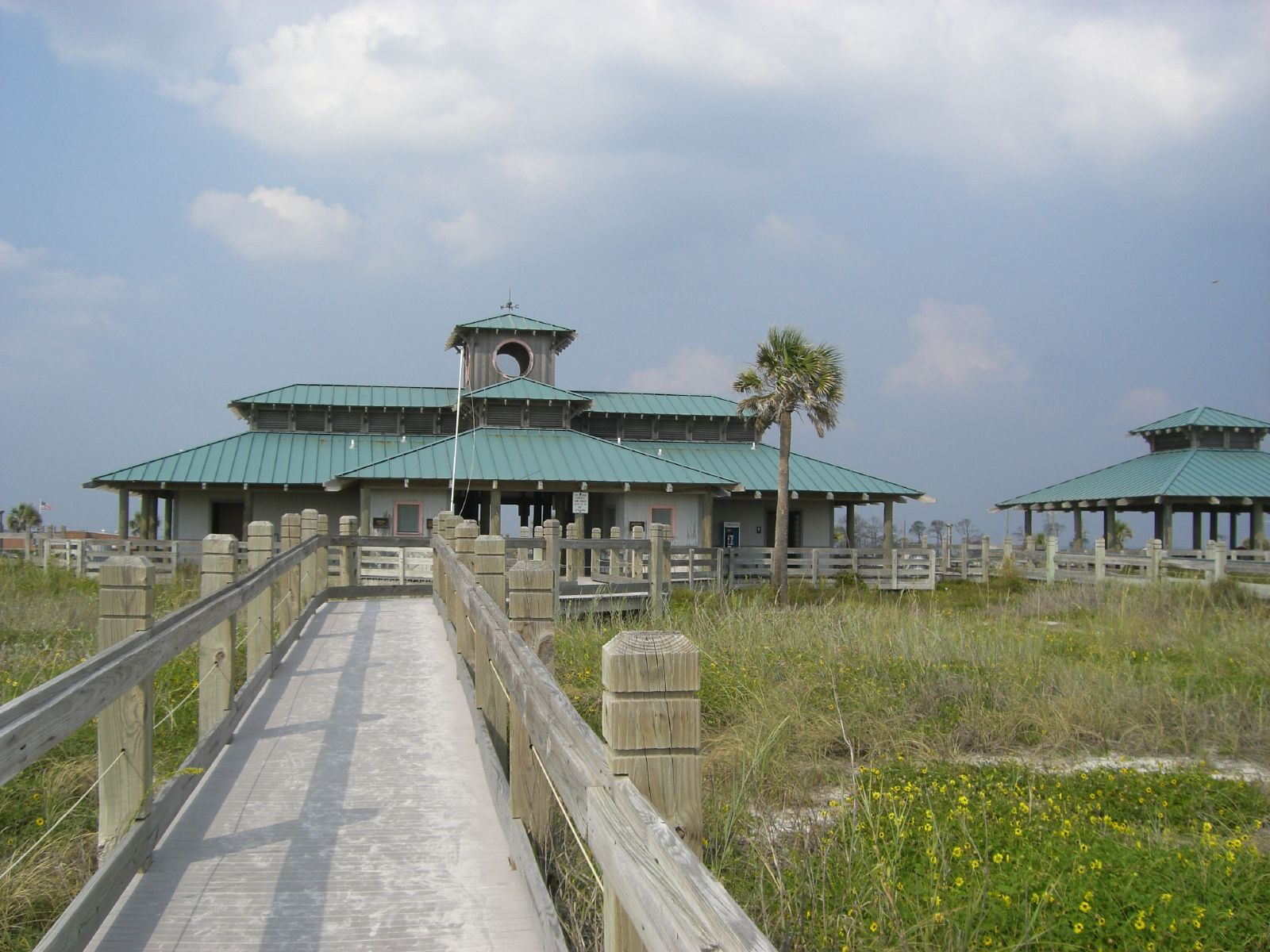
John Beasley Park

John C. Beasley Park, formerly known as John Beasley Wayside Park, is a public beach area on Okaloosa Island in Florida. It was established as a state park to provide beach access for negroes during the era of segregation. After desegregation it was turned over to the Okaloosa County. The park is named for John C. Beasley. Fodor's reported the park had 2-dune walkovers, showers, parking, toilets, lifeguards, and picnic tables.

A commemorative plaque was installed at the park in 2015. It was the only beach open to negroes in Okaloosa County until desegregation.

In May 2020, The Northwest Florida Daily News published a photograph of the beach from the 1970s (#112)
