= Cliff Lewis (linebacker) =

American football player (born 1959)

No. 56
- Position: Linebacker

Personal information
- Born: November 9, 1959 (age 66); Brewton, Alabama, U.S.
- Listed height: 6 ft 1 in (1.85 m)
- Listed weight: 226 lb (103 kg)

Career information
- High school: Fort Walton Beach (FL)
- College: Southern Miss
- NFL draft: 1981: 12th round, 311th overall pick

Career history
- Green Bay Packers (1981–1984)

Career NFL statistics
- Sacks: 2
- Stats at Pro Football Reference

Clifford Sylvester Lewis (born November 9, 1959) is an American former professional football player who was a linebacker in the National Football League (NFL). He played college football for the Southern Miss Golden Eagles.

== Biography ==
Lewis was born Clifford Sylvester Lewis on November 9, 1959, in Brewton, Alabama.

== Career ==
Lewis was selected 311th overall by the Green Bay Packers in the twelfth round of the 1981 NFL draft and played four seasons with the team. He played at the collegiate level at the University of Southern Mississippi.
