= Fort Walton Beach High School =

Public school in Fort Walton Beach, Florida, United States

Location
- 400 SW Hollywood Blvd; Fort Walton Beach; Fort Walton Beach, Okaloosa, Florida 32548; United States; 30.411996°N 86.640397°W

Information
- School type: Public
- Mottoes: VAKA, Go Vikes!
- Established: 1969
- School board: Okaloosa County School District
- Superintendent: Marcus Chambers
- Principal: Lindsay Smith
- Teaching staff: 75.60 (FTE)
- Grades: 9–12
- Enrollment: 1,558 (2023–2024)
- Student to teacher ratio: 20.61
- Campus type: Suburban
- Colors: Navy, Red, and White
- Mascot: Viking
- Rival: Choctawhatchee High School
- Yearbook: Valhalla
- Website: www.okaloosaschools.com/o/fwb

Fort Walton Beach High School is a high school located in the center of Fort Walton Beach, Florida. Lindsay Smith is the current principal. Placement classes have an open enrollment policy. The athletic program offers football, basketball, soccer, wrestling, softball, baseball,Lacrosse, swimming, cross country, track, volleyball, girls and boys weightlifting. The Vikings have won two state championships in football, two state championships in girls basketball, and one state championship in boys weightlifting.

Fort Walton Beach High School serves residents of Fort Walton Beach and Mary Esther.

== History ==
On November 15, 2022, during a visit to Fort Walton Beach High School, Florida Governor Ron DeSantis announced 114 Florida schools would be designated as Florida’s first class of Purple Star campuses.

== Extracurricular ==
=== Band ===
The Fort Walton Beach High School Viking Band has marching, symphonic, concert, and jazz bands. The Viking Band program has been listed on the John Philip Sousa Foundation's Historic Roll of Honor, an esteemed recognition shared by only 66 band programs nationwide.

The Viking Band has performed at venues such as Carnegie Hall, Washington, D.C., and international locations like Nassau, Bahamas. Recent highlights include their selection to perform at events like the 2024 Military Bowl Parade in Annapolis, showcasing their connection to the community's strong military ties.

== Notable alumni ==
- Glen Coffee (born 1987) - running back for the San Francisco 49ers
- John Egbunu (born 1994) - Nigerian-born American basketball player for Hapoel Jerusalem of the Israeli Basketball Premier League
- Amos Fowler (born 1956) - center for the Detroit Lions from 1978-1984
- E. G. Green (born 1975) - wide receiver for the Indianapolis Colts from 1998-2000
- Mike James (baseball) (born 1967) - Major League Baseball pitcher for the California Angels, St. Louis Cardinals, and the Colorado Rockies
- Cliff Lewis (born 1959) - linebacker for the Green Bay Packers from 1981-1984
- Demetria McKinney (born 1979) - actress and singer
- Deiontrez Mount (born 1993) - linebacker for the Denver Broncos
- Dyron Nix (1967-2013) - professional basketball player
- Preston Shumpert (born 1979) - professional basketball player and Syracuse University alum
- Akeem Spence (born 1991) - defensive end for the New England Patriots
- James Uthmeier (born 1987) - 39th Florida Attorney General from 2025–present
- Danny Wuerffel (born 1974) - won Heisman Trophy in 1996 as the quarterback of the Florida Gators
