= Crestview, Florida =

- City
- City of Crestview
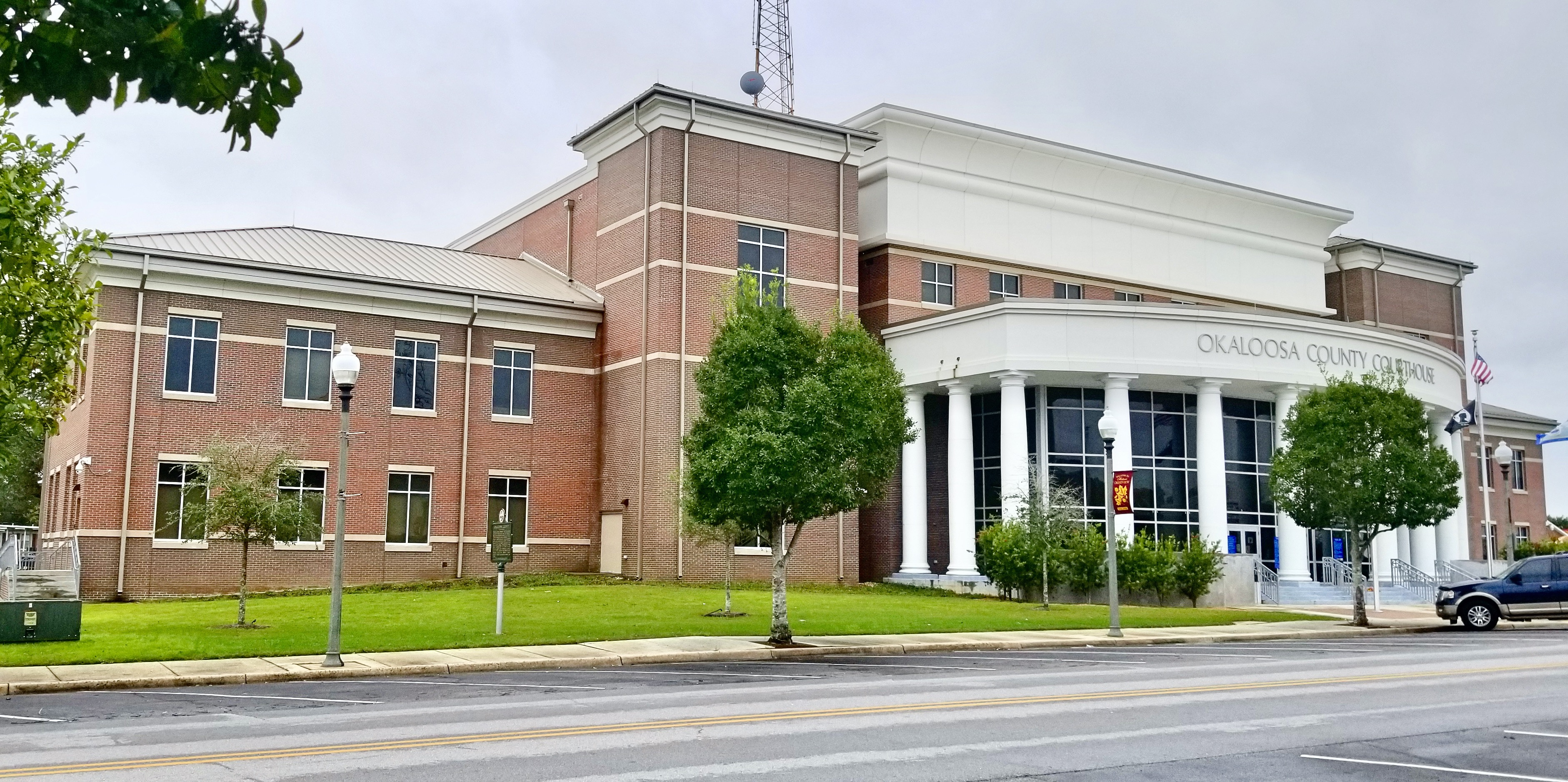
- Okaloosa County Courthouse (built 2018–2019)

- Flag Seal

- Location in Okaloosa County and the state of Florida
- Interactive map of Crestview, Florida
- Coordinates: 30°45′15″N 86°35′22″W
- Country: United States
- State: Florida
- County: Okaloosa
- Incorporated: 1916

Government
  - Type: Council–Manager

Area
  - Total: 17.27 sq mi (44.74 km^{2})
  - Land: 17.03 sq mi (44.11 km^{2})
  - Water: 0.24 sq mi (0.63 km^{2})
- Elevation: 164 ft (50 m)

Population (2020)
  - Total: 27,134
  - Density: 1,593.2/sq mi (615.12/km^{2})
- Time zone: UTC−6 (Central (CST))
  - Summer (DST): UTC−5 (CDT)
- ZIP codes: 32536, 32539
- Area code: 850
- FIPS code: 12-15475
- GNIS feature ID: 2404153
- Website: www.cityofcrestview.org

Crestview is the largest city and county seat of Okaloosa County, Florida, United States. The population was 27,134 at the 2020 census, up from 20,978 at the 2010 census. With an elevation of 236 feet (72 m) above sea level, it is one of the highest points in the state.

Crestview is a principal city of the Crestview–Fort Walton Beach–Destin, Florida Metropolitan Statistical Area.

== History ==
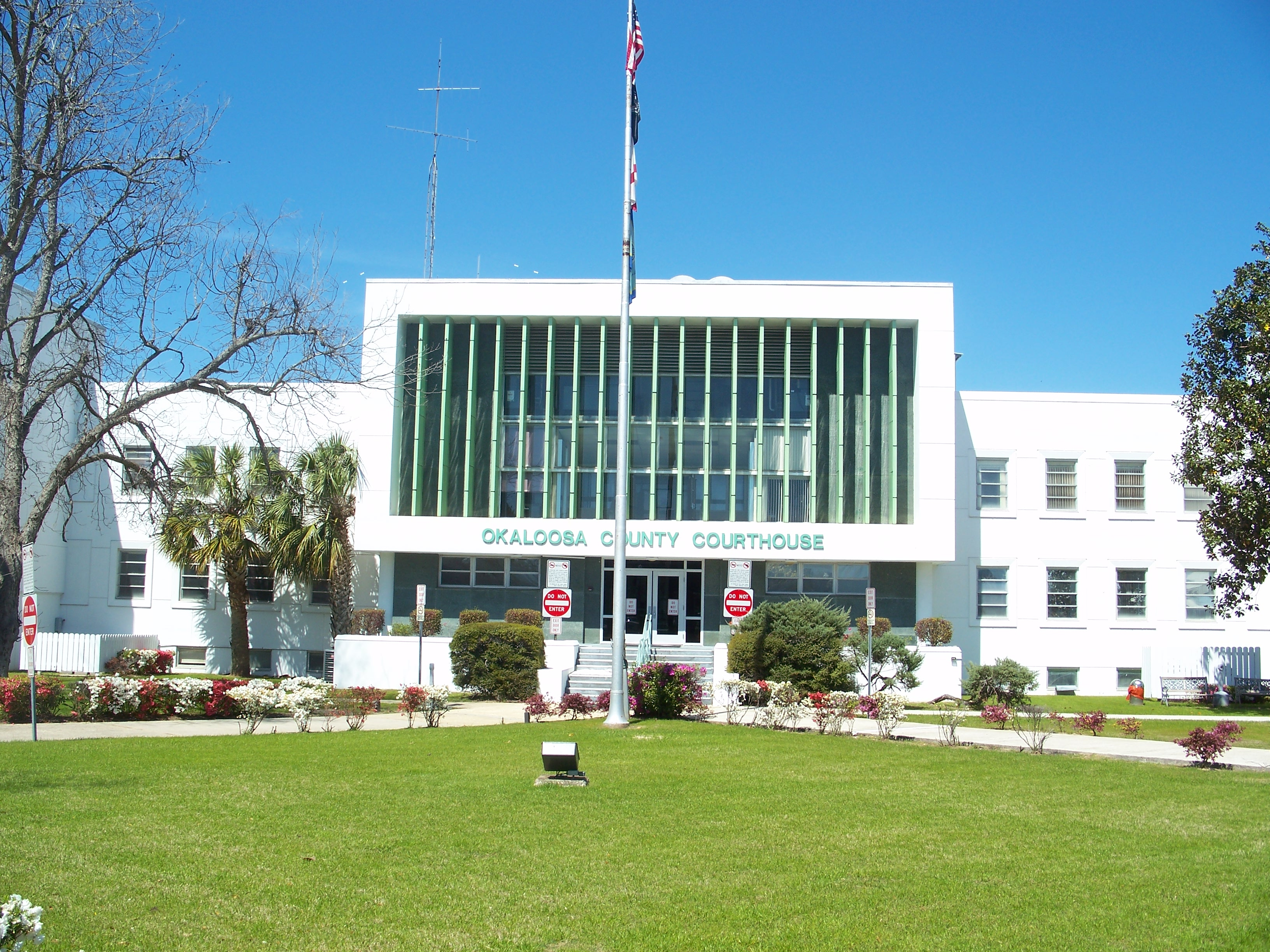
Former Okaloosa County courthouse in March 2008 (replaced in 2018)

Crestview was largely an outgrowth of the arrival of railroad service to the western Panhandle of Florida. The Pensacola and Atlantic Railroad Company, chartered in 1881, opened its line between Pensacola and Chattahoochee in January 1883. Two express passenger trains, the Atlantic Express and the Gulf Express, as well as a local accommodation train that made stops along the route, were in daily operation. The express trains took about six hours for the journey, while the local train took thirteen hours. When the railroad company was unable to cover its debt obligations, the Louisville and Nashville Railroad covered the shortfalls until 1885 and then foreclosed, absorbing the route into its system as the L&N's Pensacola and Atlantic Division.

In 1894, sawmill operator W. B. Wright opened the 26-mile (42 km) Yellow River Railroad between Crestview and Florala, Alabama via Auburn, Campton, and Laurel Hill. The L&N provided the line with freight cars and purchased the operation in 1906, renaming it the Yellow River Branch. Without significant shippers to sustain the line, it was eventually used for freight car storage in the early 1980s and was abandoned in May 1985, with 25.3 miles of track removed. Parts of the former right of way were paved as local streets.

Crestview was officially incorporated as a city in 1916. The 1920 US Census recorded the population of Crestview at 500 residents.

On July 23, 1920, Crestview hosted Okaloosa County's first public hanging. Robert Blackwell was convicted of murdering Nancy and Bud Davis in 1917 and was sentenced to death. A week before his execution, Blackwell confessed, and his confession was printed in local newspapers on the day of his hanging. The second and final public execution in Okaloosa County took place on September 23, 1921, when Putnam Ponsell and Jacob Benjamin Marin were hanged for the murder of John F. Tuggle. This double hanging was the last public execution in Florida.

In 1937, Smith-Johnson Company, Inc. opened a garment factory in Crestview, which utilized 250 machines and employed around 300 workers.

A modern bus terminal served by Greyhound Lines' Jacksonville-Los Angeles route, with connections north to Atlanta, Memphis, and New York, opened on the corner of Ferdon and Pearl Streets on May 9, 1941. The terminal featured waiting rooms, a lounge, smoking rooms, a restaurant, and a loading concourse. It was segregated.

As nearby Eglin Field expanded into a major testing base, the Louisville and Nashville Railroad laid a long sidetrack in Crestview in the spring of 1941 to handle the influx of oil tank cars required for a vast paving project on ten new airfields. A fleet of trucks operated around the clock to offload an estimated 180 carloads of petroleum products.

A recreation center for enlisted men at Eglin Field was opened in Crestview on June 21, 1941, through the efforts of the Community Recreation Council, the Works Progress Administration, and the Okaloosa Progressive Association.

In January 1943, a misunderstanding involving Crestview's constabulary led to the town being briefly off-limits to military personnel from Eglin Field. The Pensacola News Journal reported on January 31, 1943, that the restriction had been lifted after a conference between town officials and Eglin authorities. The incident was triggered when the town marshal attempted to arrest a soldier for reckless driving and an Eglin officer for interference. The overzealous marshal was suspended following the event.

On July 31, 1949, the L&N inaugurated the Gulf Wind streamliner through Crestview, connecting New Orleans and Jacksonville in partnership with the Seaboard Air Line Railroad, replacing the heavyweight New Orleans-Florida Limited. This service was discontinued on April 30, 1971, when Amtrak took over most U.S. passenger rail services.

In the 1960s, Crestview was home to the studio of the Apache Records label.

As part of the 2005 Base Realignment and Closure (BRAC) round, Crestview experienced significant population growth when the U.S. Army's 7th Special Forces Group relocated from Fort Bragg, North Carolina to a newly built facility on the northern end of the Eglin Air Force Base reservation, about six miles south of the city.

In 2007, longtime mayor George Whitehurst resigned, leading to the election of David Cadle, a retired director of the Crestview High School band, The Big Red Machine. Cadle was succeeded in 2019 by JB Whitten, a retired U.S. Air Force member, high school teacher, and Crestview city council member.

== Geography ==
=== Topography ===
According to the United States Census Bureau, the city has a total area of 12.8 square miles (33 km^{2}), of which 12.76 square miles (33.0 km^{2}) is land and 0.04 square miles (0.10 km^{2}) (0.23%) is water.

=== Climate ===
Crestview's climate is officially classified as a humid subtropical climate (Köppen Cfa). In summer, Crestview experiences some of the hottest temperatures in the state, with an average summer high of 92 °F (33 °C). Summer lows typically range from the high 60s to low 70s (19°-23 °C), with occasional days reaching 100 °F (38 °C) or more. The all-time record high is 105 °F (41 °C), recorded on July 14, 1980. On average, the city receives 63.6 inches (1,620 mm) of rainfall annually.

Winters in Crestview are similar to those of interior Alabama, Mississippi, and Georgia. Highs typically range from the lower to mid-60s (16°-19 °C), and lows average in the upper 30s to lower 40s (3°-6 °C). The all-time record low is 5 °F (−15 °C), recorded on December 13, 1962 in downtown Crestview. However, nearby areas such as DeFuniak Springs and Tallahassee recorded lows of 0 °F (−18 °C) and −2 °F (−19 °C) before the Crestview airport began keeping records. The city lies within the USDA Hardiness Zone 8b, where the coldest temperature of the season typically ranges between 15 °F (−9 °C) and 20 °F (−7 °C). On average, there are 38.5 nights per year when the temperature falls below freezing, with the average window for freezes occurring between November 10 and March 23. Measurable snowfall has occurred twice, which was on February 2, 1994, when 0.1 inches (0.25 cm) of snow fell and on January 21, 2025, when a staggering 9.0 inches (23 cm) of snow fell.

Vegetation in Crestview includes typical Floridian flora, as well as several deciduous species from farther north. Some palm trees grow in the area, but only cold-hardy varieties, such as the state tree, the Sabal palmetto. Other common species include dogwood, maple, hickory, and sweet gum. Blueberries are a native crop sold locally, along with strawberries. In 1919, M.A. Sapp reported shipping blueberries from May 10 until the end of August, earning $605.85 for his crop, in addition to sharing some with friends and family. Fall foliage can be seen in November and December, while spring blossoms typically appear from early March through May. Summer generally lasts from late April to early October, and winter extends from mid-December to mid-February.

Climate data for Crestview, Florida (Bob Sikes Airport), 1991–2020 normals, extremes 1948–present
Month	Jan	Feb	Mar	Apr	May	Jun	Jul	Aug	Sep	Oct	Nov	Dec	Year
Record high °F (°C)	85 (29)	85 (29)	90 (32)	95 (35)	101 (38)	104 (40)	105 (41)	103 (39)	102 (39)	101 (38)	90 (32)	84 (29)	105 (41)
Mean maximum °F (°C)	76.8 (24.9)	78.8 (26.0)	84.9 (29.4)	88.5 (31.4)	95.2 (35.1)	97.6 (36.4)	98.6 (37.0)	97.7 (36.5)	95.5 (35.3)	90.9 (32.7)	83.8 (28.8)	78.7 (25.9)	99.6 (37.6)
Mean daily maximum °F (°C)	62.7 (17.1)	66.8 (19.3)	73.3 (22.9)	79.4 (26.3)	86.9 (30.5)	91.1 (32.8)	92.4 (33.6)	91.7 (33.2)	88.6 (31.4)	81.1 (27.3)	71.6 (22.0)	64.6 (18.1)	79.2 (26.2)
Daily mean °F (°C)	50.6 (10.3)	54.1 (12.3)	60.0 (15.6)	66.0 (18.9)	73.7 (23.2)	79.8 (26.6)	81.8 (27.7)	81.4 (27.4)	77.7 (25.4)	68.3 (20.2)	58.1 (14.5)	52.6 (11.4)	67.0 (19.4)
Mean daily minimum °F (°C)	38.5 (3.6)	41.4 (5.2)	46.7 (8.2)	52.6 (11.4)	60.6 (15.9)	68.5 (20.3)	71.1 (21.7)	71.1 (21.7)	66.9 (19.4)	55.5 (13.1)	44.6 (7.0)	40.6 (4.8)	54.8 (12.7)
Mean minimum °F (°C)	20.3 (−6.5)	22.6 (−5.2)	27.5 (−2.5)	34.9 (1.6)	45.2 (7.3)	59.7 (15.4)	65.6 (18.7)	63.6 (17.6)	53.5 (11.9)	36.1 (2.3)	26.3 (−3.2)	23.4 (−4.8)	18.1 (−7.7)
Record low °F (°C)	6 (−14)	10 (−12)	17 (−8)	29 (−2)	38 (3)	51 (11)	57 (14)	56 (13)	40 (4)	28 (−2)	17 (−8)	5 (−15)	5 (−15)
Average precipitation inches (mm)	5.66 (144)	4.58 (116)	5.66 (144)	4.92 (125)	4.13 (105)	5.96 (151)	7.92 (201)	6.42 (163)	5.06 (129)	4.09 (104)	4.27 (108)	4.93 (125)	63.60 (1,615)
Average precipitation days (≥ 0.01 in)	10.1	9.0	8.2	7.7	8.4	12.7	15.9	14.9	10.2	7.3	7.5	9.9	121.8
Source: NOAA

== Demographics ==
Historical population
Census	Pop.	Note	%±
1920	500		—
1930	930		86.0%
1940	2,252		142.2%
1950	5,003		122.2%
1960	7,467		49.3%
1970	7,952		6.5%
1980	7,617		−4.2%
1990	9,886		29.8%
2000	14,766		49.4%
2010	20,978		42.1%
2020	27,134		29.3%
U.S. Decennial Census

=== Racial and ethnic composition ===
Crestview racial composition (Hispanics excluded from racial categories) (NH = Non-Hispanic)
Race	Pop 2010	Pop 2020	% 2010	% 2020
White (NH)	14,208	15,964	67.73%	58.83%
Black or African American (NH)	3,793	4,905	18.08%	18.08%
Native American or Alaska Native (NH)	85	118	0.41%	0.43%
Asian (NH)	636	763	3.03%	2.81%
Pacific Islander or Native Hawaiian (NH)	55	76	0.26%	0.28%
Some other race (NH)	65	173	0.31%	0.64%
Two or more races/Multiracial (NH)	746	2,146	3.56%	7.91%
Hispanic or Latino (any race)	1,390	2,989	6.63%	11.02%
Total	20,978	27,134	100%	100%

=== 2020 census ===
As of the 2020 census, Crestview had a population of 27,134. The median age was 32.1 years. 27.0% of residents were under the age of 18 and 11.3% of residents were 65 years of age or older. For every 100 females there were 95.8 males, and for every 100 females age 18 and over there were 93.7 males age 18 and over.

98.3% of residents lived in urban areas, while 1.7% lived in rural areas.

There were 9,963 households in Crestview, of which 37.9% had children under the age of 18 living in them. Of all households, 47.4% were married-couple households, 18.4% were households with a male householder and no spouse or partner present, and 27.1% were households with a female householder and no spouse or partner present. About 25.0% of all households were made up of individuals and 7.8% had someone living alone who was 65 years of age or older. There were 5,971 families residing in the city.

There were 10,794 housing units, of which 7.7% were vacant. The homeowner vacancy rate was 2.0% and the rental vacancy rate was 6.8%.

=== 2010 census ===
As of the 2010 United States census, there were 20,978 people, 7,319 households, and 5,150 families residing in the city.

=== 2000 census ===
As of the census of 2000, there were 14,766 people, 5,297 households, and 3,893 families residing in the city. The population density was 1,153.7 inhabitants per square mile (445.4/km^{2}). There were 5,918 housing units at an average density of 462.4 per square mile (178.5/km^{2}). The racial makeup of the city was 74.71% White, 18.41% African American, 0.60% Native American, 2.28% Asian, 0.15% Pacific Islander, 1.22% from other races, and 2.62% from two or more races. Hispanic or Latino of any race were 3.26% of the population. The population estimate for 2005 was 17,707 people.

In 2000, there were 5,297 households, out of which 40.9% had children under the age of 18 living with them, 53.5% were married couples living together, 16.2% had a female householder with no husband present, and 26.5% were non-families. 22.7% of all households were made up of individuals, and 8.3% had someone living alone who was 65 years of age or older. The average household size was 2.65 and the average family size was 3.09.

In 2000, the population was spread out, with 29.2% under the age of 18, 8.9% from 18 to 24, 32.5% from 25 to 44, 17.8% from 45 to 64, and 11.5% who were 65 years of age or older. The median age was 33 years. For every 100 females, there were 93.4 males. For every 100 females age 18 and over, there were 91.5 males.

In 2000, the median income for a household in the city was $23,122, and the median income for a family was $31,824. Males had a median income of $27,829 versus $19,261 for females. The per capita income for the city was $14,479. About 15.2% of families and 19.7% of the population were below the poverty line, including 23.2% of those under age 18 and 13.4% of those age 65 or over.

== Arts and culture ==
=== Library ===
The city's first library was founded in the 1940s. In 2002, the Crestview Robert L. F. Sikes Public Library opened, named in honor of the congressman Robert L. F. Sikes. The library is part of the Okaloosa County Public Library Cooperative.

== Education ==
The public schools in Crestview are served by the Okaloosa County School District.

=== Public high school ===
- Crestview School, the first school for African Americans in Crestview, was built in 1926. In 1944, a city block was purchased for a new high school for Black students. In 1945, Crestview Colored High School was built on School Avenue. It was later renamed after George Washington Carver and eventually became known as Carver-Hill School in honor of Ed Hill's efforts.
- After integration in 1966, high school students were transferred to the previously all-white Crestview High School, and Carver-Hill was utilized for younger students until 1982, when it was converted to administrative use.

=== Public middle schools ===
- Davidson Middle School is located at the north end of the city, and Shoal River Middle School is located at the south end.

=== Public elementary schools ===
- Northwood Elementary School, as well as Bob Sikes Elementary School are located at the north end of the city, Riverside Elementary School and Antioch Elementary School are located at the south end, and Walker Elementary School is located on the central-east side of the city.

== Transportation ==
Bob Sikes Airport is a public-use airport located 3 miles (4.8 km) northeast of the central business district of Crestview. It was established in 1941.

Major highways through Crestview include:

- U.S. Route 90
- Florida State Road 85
- I-10
- FL-85

From early 1994 through August 2005, Crestview was served by the tri-weekly Amtrak Sunset Limited. However, service east of New Orleans to Jacksonville and Orlando was suspended due to damage to the rail line of CSX caused by Hurricane Katrina in 2005. This was previously the route of the Gulf Wind streamlined passenger train, operated by the Louisville and Nashville Railroad. Crestview Station is still there.

== Sister cities ==
- Noirmoutier-en-l'Île, France
