= Okaloosa County School District =

School district in Florida, United States

Coordinates: 30.4060°N 86.6062°W

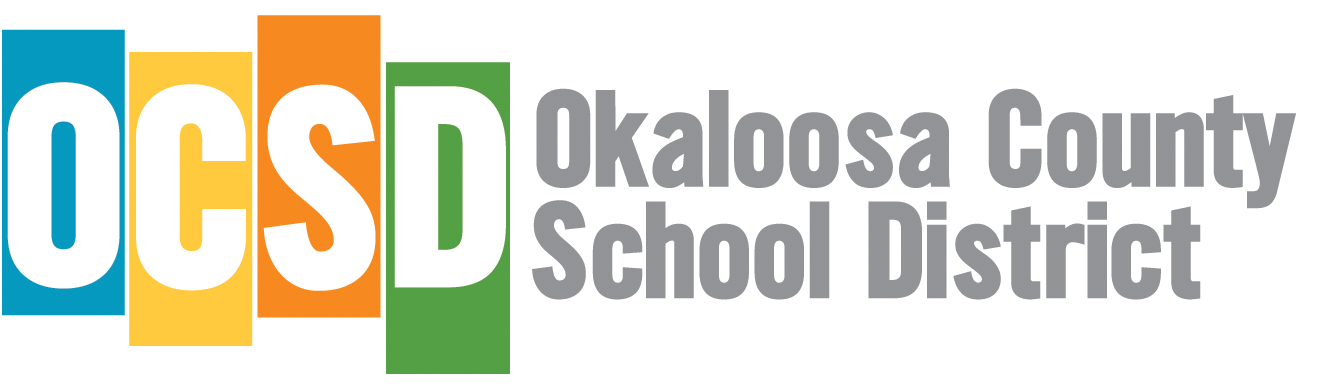

Location
- 120 Lowery Place, Fort Walton Beach, FL 32548 United States

District information
- Type: Public
- Grades: Pre-K−12
- Superintendent: Marcus Daniel Chambers (2018–19)
- Schools: 55
- Budget: $361,342,145 (2015–16)

Students and staff
- Students: 31,489 (August 2014)
- Teachers: 1,695

Other information
- Website: www.okaloosaschools.com

Okaloosa County School District is a public school district that covers Okaloosa County, Florida. The district, located in the Florida Panhandle, has its headquarters in Fort Walton Beach, Florida. The current superintendent of schools is Marcus Daniel Chambers.

== History ==
The Okaloosa County School District is one of the largest employers in Okaloosa County with approximately 3,400 employees.

Until the integration of public schools, a separate school system was maintained for white students and black students. The first colored school in Crestview was built in 1926, and named Crestview School. In 1945, Crestview Colored High School was built on School Avenue. It was renamed Carver School after George Washington Carver, and eventually Carver-Hill School in honor of African-American education advocate Ed Hill.

== School Board ==
- District 1 – Dr. Lamar White (term is from 2022–2026)
- District 2 – Parker Destin (term is from 2024–2028)
- District 3 – Linda Evanchyk (term is from 2022–2026)
- District 4 – Tim Bryant (term is from 2020–2024)
- District 5 – Brian Henley (appointed on August 1, 2024 by Gov. Desantis).

Okaloosa County school board members are subject to an unlimited number of four year terms.

== Schools ==
As of 2025, the Okaloosa County School District serves approximately 29,500 students from pre-kindergarten to adult education. Each schools has its own distinct characteristics while sharing the unified mission and vision of the District.

A fleet of 231 school buses transports over 16,000 students more than 3.2 million miles per year in addition to 182,000 miles for extra-curricular activities and field trips.

=== High schools ===
- Baker High School (Gator)
- Choctawhatchee High School (Indian)
- Crestview High School (Bulldog)
- Destin High School (Shark)
- Fort Walton Beach High School (Viking)
- (Laurel Hill School) (Hobo)
- Niceville High School (Eagle)
- Choice High School and Technical Center (No mascot)

=== Middle schools ===
- Baker Middle School (Gator)
- Bruner Middle School (Spartans)
- Davidson Middle School (Panthers)
- Destin Middle School (Marlins)
- Laurel Hill School (Hobos)
- Lewis School (Falcons)
- Meigs Middle School (Wildcats)
- Northwest Florida Ballet Academie (3–8)
- Okaloosa STEMM Center (Stingers)
- Pryor Middle School (Pirates)
- Ruckel Middle School (Rams)
- Shoal River Middle School (Mustangs)

=== Elementary schools ===
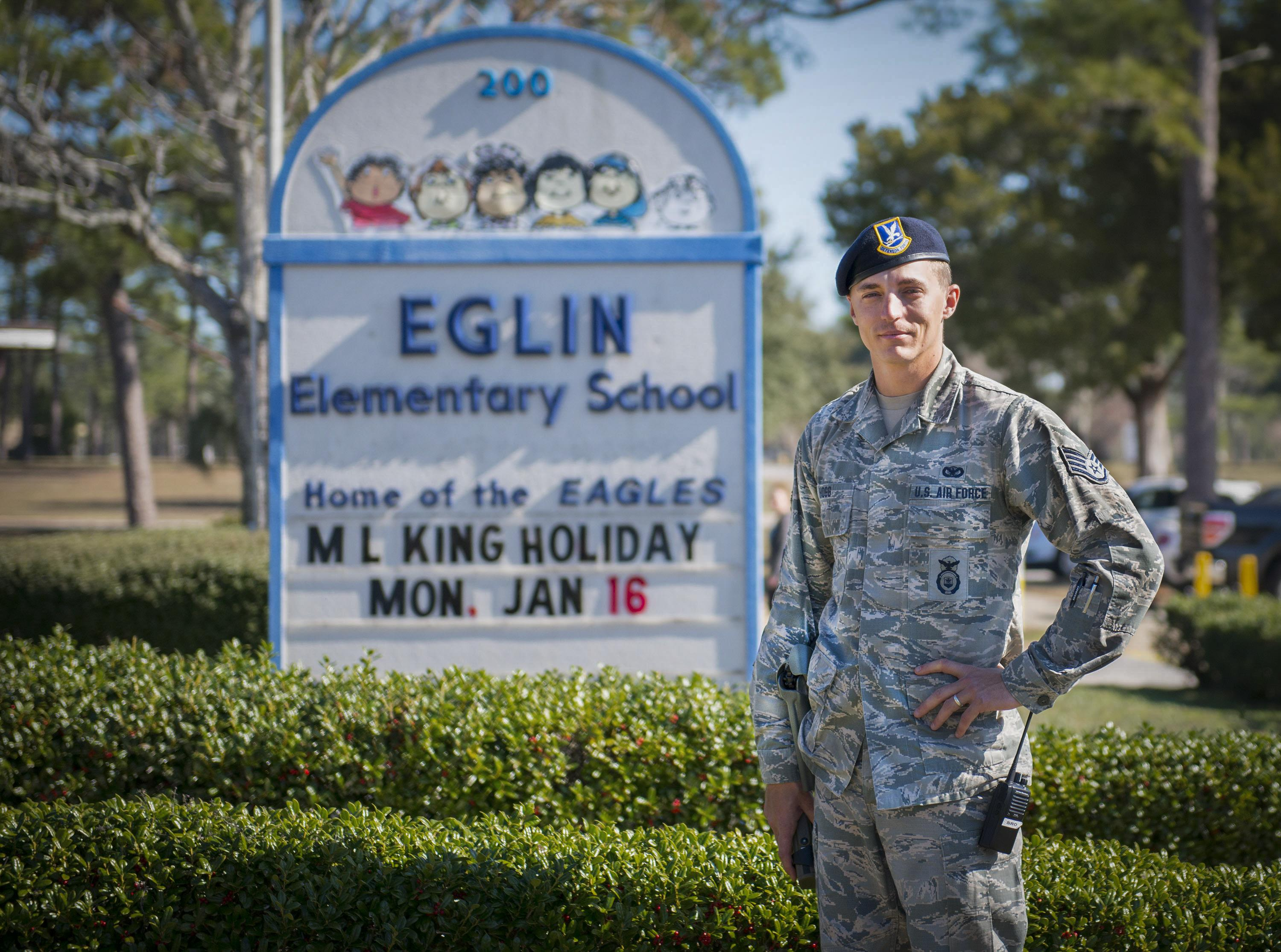
Eglin Elementary School

- Antioch Elementary School
- Baker Elementary School
- Bluewater Elementary School
- Bob Sikes Elementary School
- Destin Elementary School
- Edge Elementary School
- Edwins Elementary School
- Eglin Elementary School (Eglin Air Force Base)
- Elliott Point Elementary School
- Florosa Elementary School
- Kenwood Elementary School
- Laurel Hill School
- Lewis School
- Longwood Elementary School
- Mary Esther Elementary School
- Northwest Florida Ballet Academie (3–8)
- Northwood Elementary School
- Oakland Heights Elementary School K-6 (Mary Ester Cut-Off/Carol Av built 60s Closed 80s)
- Plew Elementary School
- Shalimar Elementary School
- Walker Elementary School
- Wright Elementary School

=== Charter/contract schools ===
- AMIkids Emerald Coast
- Destin High School
- Liza Jackson Preparatory School
- Okaloosa Academy – FWB Campus
- The Collegiate High School of NWFSC

=== Alternative schools ===
- Gulf Coast Youth Academy
- Okaloosa Regional Detention Center
- Okaloosa Youth Academy
- Okaloosa Youth Development Center
